= Ceremony of Disbanding =

- Theatrical release poster
- Directed by: Kinji Fukasaku
- Written by: Isao Matsumoto; Hideaki Yamamoto; Kinji Fukasaku
- Starring: Kōji Tsuruta
- Cinematography: Ichirō Hoshijima
- Edited by: Osamu Tanaka
- Music by: Isao Tomita
- Production company: Toei
- Distributed by: Toei
- Release date: April 1, 1967
- Running time: 93 minutes
- Country: Japan
- Language: Japanese

Ceremony of Disbanding (解散式, Kaisanshiki), also known as Dissolution Ceremony, Falling Out, or The Breakup, is a 1967 ninkyo eiga film directed by Kinji Fukasaku and starring Koji Tsuruta. It was produced by Toei Studios. Fukasaku later directed Koji Tsuruta in a similarly titled film, Bakuto kaisanshiki (Gambler's Farewell), in 1968, but the two films are unrelated.

== Plot ==
Sawaki is released from prison after serving eight years for murdering a rival gang leader in order to obtain the land rights to a landfill for the Kotaki clan and he discovers that the world has changed significantly in that time. The police have forced the disbanding of all yakuza groups in and around Tokyo and most of the former yakuza have moved on to legitimate jobs while the low-level thugs have returned to their former gangs. Shimamura, a former executive of the Kotaki clan, has become the president of a construction company that built an oil complex on the landfill and now intends to build another one as soon as they clear the inhabitants off of land owned by Dr. Omachi. Shimamura takes control of the debt owed by Dr. Omachi on his poultry farm in order to exert pressure on him. The poultry farm is worked by Mie, Sawaki's former lover and mother of his child. Sawaki feels connected to the residents and regrets past his actions that have caused their existence to now be threatened. When Shimamura and his rival former Kotaki clan executive Sakurada battle over the land rights and each pressure the residents in their own way, Sawaki views them as corrupt and decides to follow his traditional code of honor to save the residents.

== Cast ==
- Kōji Tsuruta as Ryūzo Sawaki
- Fumio Watanabe as Iwao Shimamura
- Tetsuro Tamba as Keijirō Sakai
- Shirō Ōtsuji as Masa
- Masakazu Kuwayama as Shinsuke Ōmachi
- Asao Uchida as Yasuzō Kawashima
- Hōsei Komatsu as Tatsuo Sakurada
- Nobuo Kaneko as Tokumichi Itagaki
- Sumiko Fuji as Mie
- Yasuhiro Komiya as Akio
- Kōji Hio as Aida
- Harumi Sone as Nishimura
- Yoshirō Ichikawa as Takeshi
- Sumio Ichikawa as Maabō
- Minoru Uezu as Appache
- Ryō Suga as Sabu
- Junko Miyazono as Sachiko
- Kyōsuke Machida as Kubo
- Nobuo Yana as Yasuhara
- Akira Kasuga as Koyama
- Hideo Murota as Nakanishi
- Akikane Sawa as Tani
- Hiroshi Nihonyanagi as Kamiyama
- Keiichi Kitagawa as Itagaki's Secretary
- 安城貴由子 as Sakurada's Concubine
- Kōsaku Okano as Pressman A
- Junnosuke Takasu as Pressman B
- Tsuneo Tagawa as Pressman C
- Yūko Minakaze as Woman in Bar
- Toshiyuki Tsuchiyama as Sakurada's Murderer A
- Kōji Miemachi as Sakurada's Murderer B
- Eiji Takahashi as Hooligan A
- Yōsuke Enomoto as Hooligan B
- Izumi Noguchi as Hooligan C
- Gōzō Sōma as Hooligan D
- Jirō Miyaguchi as Hooligan E

== Release ==
The title of the film has also been translated as Dissolution Ceremony, The Break-up, and The Breakup.

== Reception and analysis ==
In his book Outlaw Masters of Japanese Film, author Chris D. writes that, with Ceremony of Disbanding, "Fukasaku continued to insert hot potato issues into his pictures."

In her book Rising Sun, Divided Land: Japanese and South Korean Filmmakers, author Kate Taylor-Jones notes that "Fukasaku's early films," including Kaisanshiki, "often focus on those residing in poor areas on the outskirts of the developing cities. Gangsters, prostitutes, criminals and poverty-stricken slum-dwellers are presented as the often unseen results of Japan's economic drive. Rather than the heroes of the popular ninkyō Fukasaku offers central characters who are far from the honorable and are often doomed to failure, death, imprisonment and pain. He presents the people that the economic developments were leaving behind - outcasts who are alienated from the wider society."

In his book Archetypes in Japanese film: The Sociopolitical and Religious Significance of the Principal Heroes and Heroines, author Gregory Barrett writes that "the Tsuruta hero would often refrain from sex. In Dissolution Ceremony (Kaisan-shiki 1967, directed by Kinji Fukasaku) on the night he gets out of prison he refuses the playmate his ritual brother offers him. The following morning he goes off in search of his wife only to find that she would no longer have anything to do with him because she wants to lead a respectable life. Thereafter, like a monk taking a vow of celibacy, he has nothing to do with any woman."
