= Hideo Murota =

Japanese actor (1937–2002)

- Born: 7 October 1937; Otaru, Hokkaido, Japan
- Died: 15 June 2002 (aged 64)
- Occupation: Actor
- Years active: 1953–2002

Hideo Murota (室田 日出男, Murota Hideo; 7 October 1937 – 15 June 2002) was a Japanese actor who specialized in playing villains and tough guys. In 1957, he signed a contract with Toei Studio and appeared in over 1000 films. He won the Best Supporting Actor award at the Yokohama Film Festival for his role in Shinde mo ii.

== Selected filmography ==
=== Film ===
- 1953: Daibosatsu Tôge - Dai-ni-bu: Mibu to Shimabara no maki; Miwa kamisugi no maki - Takagawa
- 1960: Bôso omote he derô
- 1961: Hachi-nin me no teki
- 1961: Shin jinsei gekijô
- 1962: Ankoku-gai saigo no hi
- 1962: Nerai uchi no buraikan
- 1963: Tokubetsu kidô sôsatai
- 1963: Tokubetsu kidô sôsatai: Tokyo eki ni harikome
- 1963: Ankokugai saidai no kettô - Ishigami
- 1963: Asakusa no kyôkaku
- 1963: Showa kyokyaku den
- 1963: Yakuza no uta
- 1963: Tôkyô gyangu tai Honkon gyangu
- 1964: Wolves, Pigs and Men - Mizuhara
- 1964: Doro inu
- 1965: A Fugitive from the Past - Pressman
- 1965: Himo
- 1965: Kuroi neko - Sagawa
- 1965: Nippon dorobô monogatari - Saiki, News reporter
- 1965: Zoku Abashiri bangaichi
- 1965: Shôwa zankyô-den - Yakuza
- 1965: Gyangu chôjô sakusen - Chin
- 1966: Shôwa zankyô-den: Karajishi botan
- 1966: The Threat - Sabu
- 1966: Otoko no shôbu
- 1966: Kaitei daisensô - Henchman
- 1966: Ninkyô yawara ichidai
- 1966: Umi no koto - Guest
- 1966: Otoko dokyô de shobû
- 1966: Kamikaze Man: Duel at Noon - Detective
- 1966: Rampaging Dragon of the North - Gen Ashida
- 1967: Ceremony of Disbanding - Nakanishi
- 1967: Soshiki bôryoku
- 1967: Kawachi yûkyôden - Sutezo
- 1967: Zoku soshiki bôryoku - Detective Sawai
- 1967: Choueki juhachi-nen: kari shutsugoku
- 1968: Rikugun chôhô 33 - Oku
- 1968: Kaidan hebi-onna - Saiji
- 1968: Uragiri no ankokugai - Barman
- 1968: Blackmail Is My Life - Seki
- 1968: Gokuchu no kaoyaku
- 1968: Gambler's Farewell
- 1968: Ah, yokaren - Teacher
- 1969: Black Rose Mansion - Kyohei's son - Wataru's brother
- 1969: Japan Organized Crime Boss
- 1970: Tora! Tora! Tora! - Japanese Pilot (uncredited)
- 1972: Street Mobster - Miyahara
- 1972: Female Prisoner 701: Scorpion - Okizaki
- 1972: Wandering Ginza Butterfly 2: She-Cat Gambler - Tadokoro
- 1972: Female Convict Scorpion: Jailhouse 41 - Okizaki
- 1972: Outlaw Killers: Three Mad Dog Brothers
- 1973: Battles Without Honor and Humanity: Deadly Fight in Hiroshima - Keisuke Nakahara
- 1973: Hissatsu Shikakenin - Matajûrô Mineyama
- 1973: Battles Without Honor and Humanity: Proxy War - Hideo Hayakawa
- 1973: Karate Kiba - Hijacker A
- 1973: Bodigaado Kiba: Hissatsu sankaku tobi - Tatsumi Masaru
- 1974: Battles Without Honor and Humanity: Police Tactics - Hideo Hayakawa
- 1974: Violent Streets - Mochizuki
- 1974: Zero Woman: Red Handcuffs - Masashi Kusaka
- 1974: Executioner - Boss
- 1974: Sister Street Fighter: Hanging by a Thread - Kazushige Osone
- 1974: New Battles Without Honor and Humanity - Masuo Nozaki
- 1975: Graveyard of Honor - Yasuo Matsuoka
- 1975: Cops vs. Thugs - Tsukahara
- 1975: Gambling Den Heist - Kumakichi
- 1975: Cross the Rubicon!
- 1975: Champion of Death
- 1975: New Battles Without Honor and Humanity: The Boss's Head - Takeo Akamatsu
- 1976: Violent Panic: The Big Crash
- 1976: Karate Warriors
- 1976: Yakuza Graveyard - Hidaka
- 1976: The Classroom of Terror
- 1976: Yakuza Graveyard
- 1977: Karate for Life
- 1977: Doberman Cop - Jiro Takahashi
- 1977: Proof of the Man - Detective at Yokota
- 1978: Shogun's Samurai - Sagenta Nogero (Leader of Negoro Clan)
- 1978: Talk of the Town Tora-san - Soeda
- 1979: Hunter in the Dark - Hino
- 1980: Kagemusha - Nobufusa Baba
- 1980: The Beast to Die - Hideyuki Kashiwagi
- 1981: Samurai Reincarnation - Priest Inshun Hozoin
- 1981: Station - Shigeru Morioka
- 1982: Onimasa - Sagara
- 1982: The Go Masters
- 1983: Theater of Life as Narahei
- 1983: Merry Christmas, Mr. Lawrence - New Commandant of Camp
- 1983: The Go Masters
- 1985: Seburi monogatari - Kuzushiri
- 1986: Minami e Hashire, Umi no Michi o! - Kazuyuki Kiryu
- 1986: Tokei – Adieu l'hiver
- 1987: A Taxing Woman - Jūkichi Ishii
- 1987: Sure Death 4: Revenge - Yahei Hirano
- 1987: Kyofu-no yacchan - Sentaro Jinnai
- 1987: Abunai deka
- 1990: Heaven and Earth - Obu Masatora
- 1990: Ready to Shoot
- 1991: Hiruko the Goblin - Watanabe
- 1992: Original Sin - Hideki Tsuchiya
- 1993: The City That Never Sleeps: Shinjuku Shark - Momoi
- 1995: Gonin - Shikine
- 2000: Isola: Tajuu jinkaku shôjo - Old victim of the Great Hanshin Earthquake
- 2002: Women in the Mirror - Goda

=== Television ===
- Shin Seven Color Mask (1960)
- National Kid (1960)
- Key Hunter (1968-73) (26 appearances as a guest star)
- Hissatsu Shikakenin (1972) (ep. 1)
- G-Men '75 (1975) (ep. 1 and 8)
- Zenryaku Ofukurosama (1975-77)
- Ōgon no Hibi (1978) as Hachisuka Masakatsu
- Taiyō ni Hoero! (1986) (ep. 696)
- Abunai Deka (1986) (ep. 50)
- Hōjō Tokimune (2001) as Hattori Masaemon
