= The Proud Challenge =

1962 Japanese crime film

- Japanese: 誇り高き挑戦
- Directed by: Kinji Fukasaku
- Written by: Susumu Saji
- Starring: Kōji Tsuruta
- Cinematography: Ichirō Hoshijima
- Production company: Toei Tokyo
- Distributed by: Toei Company
- Release date: March 28, 1962 (Japan)
- Running time: 90 minutes
- Country: Japan
- Languages: Japanese; English

The Proud Challenge (Japanese: 誇り高き挑戦, Hepburn: Hokori takaki chosen) is a 1962 Japanese black-and-white crime action film directed by Kinji Fukasaku.

== Plot ==
Kuroki, a reporter for the trade paper Tekko Shinpo, is investigating the arms manufacturer Mihara Industries on suspicion of the illegal trafficking of weapons from Japan to countries in Southeast Asia. He notices some foreign visitors leaving the company and discovers that they are purportedly visiting in order to attend an exhibit sponsored by Toyo Arts Society, which is led by Takayama Hiroshi. Kuroki confronts Takayama about the unsolved murder of Yamaguchi Natsuko on an Allied Forces army base where they both served during the Korean War. He had traced the murder back to special ops but was threatened to drop the investigation and was fired from Maicho Newspaper. Takayama admits that Natsuko worked for the Japanese-Russian League and was killed and made out to be a prostitute for refusing to gather information for the allies but continues to warn Kuroki to drop the story. Kuroki takes the story to Maicho Newspaper but they refuse to print a story critical of the intelligence department, just like before.

Kuroki bumps into his old friend Hiromi, who is now married to Sam, an African-American soldier who was injured in the Korean War. She works at Mihara Industries and is able to confirm that they are trafficking arms, though she does not know who the customer is.

Takayama is involved in an affair with Marin, the wife of Sudan, the leader to whom he is selling arms to aid him in crushing revolutionaries in his country. She is also secretly providing the leader of the revolutionaries with information so that they can stop the deal. Hiromi is abducted and a fake Dear John letter is sent to Sam. Kuroki blackmails Marin with a photo of her meeting with revolutionaries and she allows him to follow her to a mental hospital where he finds Hiromi caged in a cell, but he is then beaten and thrown into a different cell. Takayama suspects Marin of working with Kuroki and intends to interrogate him to discover if Marin has been working with him so Marin sneaks a gun to Kuroki through the bars of his cell. Kuroki uses it to escape and notifies the Tekko Shinpo that the arms are being loaded onto the ship that day. The revolutionaries end up attacking a decoy truck based on Marin's false information while the weapons from the other trucks are successfully shipped out aboard the ship.

Kuroki has Hiromi released from the mental hospital but she is seriously traumatized from the experience and Sam shouts at the staff in despair. Kuroki confronts Marin and Takayama and threatens to publish the story, but Takayama explains that there is more to the story. The revolutionaries arrive and Takayama sells them information about where the weapons will be unloaded upon arrival in their country. The revolutionaries board the ship and find evidence that the weapons were shipped from Japan but the Japanese authorities deny it and Allied Forces officials attempt to stop the story as well as Takayama. Takayama overhears Marin calling the Allied Forces and telling his location in exchange for the ability to flee to America to avoid retaliation by the revolutionaries, so in retaliation Takayama calls the revolutionaries and gives them Marin's location. Marin flees the hotel where they were hiding but is stabbed to death on the street in broad daylight.

Takayama calls Kuroki and tells him to meet him one last time at Landfill 4 for the full story about the arms deal, but is shot and run over by Allied Forces members before Kuroki can reach him. The newspapers run cover stories suggesting yakuza wars as the cause. Kuroki complains to Natsuko's sister that nothing has changed in ten years, but she encourages him not to let himself be defeated.

== Cast ==
- Kōji Tsuruta as Kuroki
- Tetsurō Tanba as Takayama Hiroshi
- Hitomi Nakahara as Hiromi
- Tatsuo Umemiya as Hatano
- Mayumi Ozora as Natsuko's sister
- Eitarō Ozawa
- Nobuo Yana
- Yuko Kuzonoki as Marin

== Production and release ==
The film was shot in black and white with mono sound. It was produced by Toei Tokyo and distributed by Toei Company. It was released in Japan on March 28, 1962.

== Reception and analysis ==
In an interview with Chris Desjardins in the book Outlaw Masters of Japanese Film, Fukasaku explained that The Proud Challenge "was meant as an exposé of the CIA's plot to crush the Communist and socialist left in Japan."

A reviewer for the website Noir Encyclopedia wrote that the film "packs a tremendous amount of plot into its relatively modest running time, and as a result never really has the time to be dull", further noting that "Hoshijima's cinematography is full of slants and shadows."

Reviewer Patrick McCoy of the website Lost In Translation wrote that The Proud Challenge "grabs the viewer's attention immediately" and concluded that "the film is a suspenseful thriller that offers a critique of political corruption, hypocrisy, and journalistic cowardice in postwar Japan."

In the article "The Secret History of Japanese Cinema: The Yakuza movies", author Federico Varese wrote that the film "had a clear political message: a reporter uncovers evidence that a Japanese company is exporting weapons to Southeast Asia with the complicity of the CIA. The final scene suggests that the entire fabric of Japanese democracy is controlled by American interests aimed at crushing the socialist left (Toei's conservative managers seriously objected to the wider implication of the movie and put Fukasaku on probation for six months)."
