= Jakoman and Tetsu (1964 film) =

- Theatrical release poster
- Directed by: Kinji Fukasaku
- Written by: Keizo Kajino; Akira Kurosawa; Senkichi Taniguchi
- Screenplay by: Akira Kurosawa; Senkichi Taniguchi
- Based on: Herring Fishery by Keizo Kajino
- Starring: Ken Takakura; Tetsurō Tamba
- Cinematography: Makoto Tsudoi
- Edited by: Yoshiki Nagasawa
- Music by: Masaru Satō
- Production company: Toei
- Distributed by: Toei
- Release date: February 8, 1964
- Running time: 100 minutes
- Country: Japan
- Language: Japanese

Jakoman and Tetsu (ジャコ萬と鉄, Jakoman to Tetsu), also known as One-Eyed Captain and Tetsu is a 1964 Japanese film directed by Kinji Fukasaku based on an earlier screenplay by Akira Kurosawa and Senkichi Taniguchi that was based on the novel Nishin gyogyo (English: Herring Fishery) by Keizo Kajino. The screenplay had previously been filmed by director Senkichi Taniguchi in 1949.

== Plot ==
In March 1947, the 21st year of the Shōwa era, aging fishery boss Kyubei is facing another year of financial uncertainty at the Shimamui fishing grounds on the Shakotan Peninsula in northern Hokkaido. Kyubei and his son-in-law Sōtarō borrow money to buy a herring net and hire a group of migrant workers as fisherman, but a one-eyed man named Jakoman arrives and throws Kyubei's fishing operation into disarray, terrorizing the other fishermen and vowing revenge on Kyubei for stealing his boat and leaving him stranded on Sakhalin three years earlier. Near the end of the fishing season, Kyubei's young and rowdy son Tetsu, believed to be lost at sea in the Philippines, miraculously returns and decides to confront Jakoman.

== Cast ==
- Ken Takakura as Tetsu (鉄)
- Tetsurō Tamba as Jakoman (ジャコ萬)
- Isao Yamagata as Kyubei (九兵衛), Tetsu's father
- Yōko Minamida as Masa (マサ), Tetsu's older sister
- Kumeko Urabe as Taka (タカ), Tetsu's mother
- Wakaba Irie as Young farm girl (牧場の少女)
- Hizuru Takachiho as Yuki (ユキ)
- Shinjirō Ehara as Osaka (大阪)
- Shirō Ōsaka as Sōtarō (宗太郎), Masa's husband and Tetsu's brother-in-law

== Production ==
It was a very unusual project for Ken Takakura. Takakura had seen the 1949 Toho version when it was first released and was so excited that he couldn't sleep at night, so he asked Shigeru Okada, then the director of Toei's Tokyo Studio, to let him do it. Okada had declared that he would make Takakura a 100-million-yen star in 1964, and decided to produce the film to make Takakura the definitive Toei star of 1964.

When the decision was made to make the film, Takakura Ken went to the Toho Studios to greet Toshiro Mifune, the star of the earlier 1949 adaptation filmed by director Senkichi Taniguchi. Mifune, who happened to be alone in the room, stood up to welcome Takakura's visit and made him some tea. Takakura, who was originally a fan of Mifune, was completely thrilled and came to respect Mifune thereafter.

Takakura was just about to make his breakthrough, but he did not get along well with director Kinji Fukasaku. After the shooting was complete, Fukasaku also said to those around him, "I will never use such a bad actor again." For this reason, Takakura and Fukasaku have only worked together on three films: Jakoman and Tetsu, Wolves, Pigs and Men, and Kamikaze Man: Duel at Noon, in which Takakura made a special appearance. Yasuo Furuhata has said that Ken Takakura was originally intended to play the lead role in Battles Without Honor and Humanity, but Shigeru Shundo advised Ken that he should not take the role. The other reason why Ken decided not to appear in the film was because he did not get along well with Fukasaku following the filming of Jakoman and Tetsu.

The film was shot on location on Shimamui Coast on the Shakotan Peninsula from December 1 to December 20, 1963. In the summer the area is crowded with fishermen and swimmers from Sapporo, but in the winter it becomes a lonely fishing village. The town of Irashatomachi welcomed the 80 people from Toei's film crew with a banner reading "Welcome Toei Film crew". Every day the cast and crew were treated to a feast of seafood, including hockey pike, but Takakura hated fish and could only eat squid sashimi. The filming took place on the Shimamui Coast, over the rocky mountains from Irashatomachi. The unit of herring caught was called "one stone" or "two stones", but this area was once called "a thousand-stone fishing ground", and the wide coast was filled with herring. It was one of the best fishing grounds in Hokkaido, where tens of millions of yen were made overnight. 40 million yen were spent to renovate a dilapidated herring house and a tunnel dug to transport herring by trolley. The usual weather forecast is sunny, but this film was chosen to be shot when the waves of the Sea of Okhotsk were raging in order to bring out the desolate atmosphere of the extremely cold northern sea.

Toshiro Mifune, who played Tetsu in the earlier 1949 film adaptation, had worn a rubber pants on his lower body and had been naked on his upper body, but the night before the location shooting, Takakura claimed, "If it'll make a good movie, I'll do it in just a loincloth." Fishermen go into the sea with grease covering their bodies, but Takakura simply jumped into the sea at minus 16 degrees Celsius, with people around him warning him that he would die. He was immediately pulled out, regretting his decision. He slept for three days and almost died.

== Release ==
The film was released in Japan on February 8, 1964.

A Blu-ray with new English subtitles and an audio commentary by Tom Mes and Jasper Sharp was released by 88 Films on April 22, 2025.
