= High Noon for Gangsters =

1961 Japanese crime film

- Japanese: 白昼の無頼漢
- Directed by: Kinji Fukasaku
- Written by: Susumu Saji
- Produced by: Oga Yoshifumu
- Starring: Tetsuro Tamba
- Cinematography: Ichirō Hoshijima
- Music by: Tomokazu Kawabe
- Production company: Toei Tokyo
- Distributed by: New Toei Co., Ltd.
- Release date: 1961
- Running time: 82 minutes
- Country: Japan
- Languages: Japanese; English

High Noon for Gangsters (Japanese: 白昼の無頼漢, Hepburn: Hakuchu no buraikan), also known as Greed in Broad Daylight, is a 1961 Japanese black-and-white yakuza crime drama film directed by Kinji Fukasaku starring Tetsurō Tamba.

== Plot ==
A Japanese man named Miyahara gathers together a group of people of various nationalities with stains on their records to plan an attack on a U.S. military cash transport truck. The members of the team are Tom, a black soldier previously convicted for murder, Kanayama, a South Korean who pretends to be a radio dealer but is actually a spy who travels between North and South Korea, and John Kennedy, a delinquent American. Tensions boil among the group, gleefully fueled by Miyahara. Miyahara buys Hanako, a half-black and half-Japanese girl, from a restaurant and gives her to Tom to calm him down. Love soon develops between the two outsiders who discover a mutual understanding of each other. Miyahara obtains a pistol from Zhao, a Chinese mastermind who leads to the underworld, and sets out to attack the cash truck. However, the yakuza also attack to steal the money, leading to a vicious battle.

== Cast ==
- Tetsurō Tamba as Miyahara
- Naoko Kubo as Aki
- Issac Saxson as Tom Twain
- Danny Yuma as John Kennedy
- Harumi Sone as Saburo
- Hitomi Nakahara as Hanako
- Mitsuo Andō as Nishikawa
- Eijirō Yanagi as Satoshi
- Lyke Hanton as Driver
- Chico Lourant
- Douglas Rogers as Convoy A
- Ronald Self
- Raven Shelton as Ann
- Jane Smith as Convoy B
- Azaki Suzuki
- Peter Williams

== Production and release ==
In a Kuradashi interview shortly before his death, Fukasaku said, "Bakunou no Rakuyakan is a story about a greedy protagonist played by Tetsuro Tamba who attacks a U.S. cash transport truck along with an American, a Korean, a black soldier, and a mixed-race girl. I was able to try out many new things while shooting, including using a handheld camera, so this film was a turning point for me."

The film was shot in black and white with mono sound.

It was Fukasaku's fifth film overall and his first feature-length effort.

Fukasaku made many uncredited changes to Saji's script, and Saji was initially unhappy about this.

The film was distributed by New Toei Co., Ltd.

The film has been released under various titles in English, among them High Noon for Gangsters, Greed in Broad Daylight, and Villains in Broad Daylight.

== Reception ==
In the book Historical Dictionary of Japanese Cinema, author Jasper Sharp writes that, along with Wolves, Pigs and Men and Gang vs. G-Men, "Greed in Broad Daylight (Hakuchû no buraikan, 1961), about a gang of fireigners' attempts to hold up an armored truck containing U.S. army pay [ . . . ] established Fukasaku's pattern for contemporary action and crime dramas inspired by the French New Wave and American noir, featuring realistic portrayals of violence and often set in chaotic, working-class milieux."

In a review for The Austin Chronicle, Marjorie Baumgarten wrote, "One of Fukasaku's first yakuza films to earn critical praise, High Noon for Gangsters is the unsentimental story of three brothers – one a lone wolf and the other two in gangs – who plot against each other."

Kimihiko Kamata of eiganokuni.com wrote, "The first half of the film spends more time depicting the tensions in the interpersonal relationships of the mixed team than preparing the attack plan, but it does not have the depth of Odds Against Tomorrow (1959, directed by Robert Wise). [...] The ruins of Camp McNair, an amusement park near the US military base near Lake Yamanaka with saloons that appear in the Western drama Kagamihara, where the gunfight takes place, is a wonderful location, and it was later also used as a location for League of Gangsters. [...] In addition, due to the short shooting period, some parts were filmed by the second team led by assistant director Koji Ota."
