= Gambler's Farewell =

- Original film poster
- Bakuto kaisanshiki
- Directed by: Kinji Fukasaku
- Written by: Norio Osada; Fumio Konami
- Starring: Koji Tsuruta
- Production company: Toei Company, Ltd.
- Distributed by: Toei
- Release date: February 9, 1968 (Japan)
- Running time: 90 minutes
- Country: Japan
- Language: Japanese

Gambler's Farewell (Japanese: 博徒解散式, Hepburn: Bakuto kaisanshiki) is a 1968 yakuza film directed by Kinji Fukasaku starring Koji Tsuruta. It is the sixth film in the Bakuto (Gambler) series of films produced by Toei Studios. Fukasaku had previously directed Koji Tsuruta in a similarly titled film, Kaisanshiki (Ceremony of Disbanding), in 1967, but the two films are unrelated.

== Plot ==
Iwasaki Family Junior Div. Chief Kuroki is released from prison after eight years to find that Maeda, the new police chief of the prefecture, has declared war on the Iwasaki organized crime family and demands its disbanding. Iwasaka Family Chief Masayoshi Iwasaki insists that, without his moral organization, there will be too many hotheads on the street with no guaranteed livelihood. He appoints Kuroki head of Iwasaki Transport, a legitimate organization designed to employ such types as longshoremen, and assures Maeda that there will be no problems.

Iwasaki Projects Executive Eiji Karasawa has split from the Iwasaki Family and gone legitimate. When a government official suggests that yakuza-related companies not be given contracts, Karasawa arranges for clients to cancel multiple contracts with Iwasaki Transport so that Kuroki will have to accept a job being offered by Karasawa with a tight deadline that will cause a rift between Iwasaki Transport and the longshoremen it employs.

Koike, an upright on-site supervisor for Iwasaki Transport who spent four years in prison for murdering a laborer and later married the man's widow, gets into conflicts with Tamaru and other workers who are stealing goods during transfer at the port or otherwise relaxing. After one such argument with Yoshihara, he is killed by a suspended load in a workplace accident and Yoshihara is accused of murder. Kuroki intervenes and declares it an accident, sending everyone back to work. Karasawa takes advantage of the situation and sends multiple demands to raise the tension at the worksite. Supervisor Gondo, secretly working under Karasawa's orders, beats Yoshihara to death. The longshoremen blame their employers at Iwasaki Transport for the death and they riot, destroying the company office before Maeda breaks it up.

Without the support of the laborers, Masayoshi Iwasaki must give up Iwasaki Transport. Kuroki asks permission to open a gambling joint to pay the family's debts and challenge Karasawa. Two other supervisors, One Arm and Isao, discover that Gondo is working with Karasawa so they attack them but end up dead. Karasawa and the other executives of the family attempt to wrest control of the ports from Masayoshi Iawasaki by forcing him to disband the family. Masayoshi declares that he will never disband the family just before he dies. Kuroki announces to the executives that he is now head of the family and refuses to disband. Akiko, a woman Kuroki saved from at attack by some American servicemen years earlier, sells her bar to join him.

Karasawa pays their old friend, the heroin addict Kasai, to kill Kuroki. Kasai sneaks into Kuroki's place and confesses the plans to him, then dies in the ensuing knife fight. Karasawa and the other executives take over the activities at the port under a newly incorporated organization and hold a press conference announcing that they have no affiliation with the Iwasaki Family. Kuroki later confronts Karasawa with the bloody knife and they kill each other with their knives. Akiko sails away from the port alone.

== Cast ==
- Kōji Tsuruta as Toru Kuroki
- Fumio Watanabe as Eiji Karasawa
- Tetsurō Tamba as Tetsuji Kasai
- Seizaburo Kawazu as Masayohi Iwasaki
- Masayo Mari as Akiko
- Yukiko Kuwahara as Michiy
- Hideo Murota as Koike
- Rin'ichi Yamamoto as The One-Arm
- Harumi Sone as Isao
- Kōji Sekiyama as Gondō
- Kōji Hio as Mossou
- Nobuo Yana as Dosa
- Kōji Takishima as Matsumoto
- Akikane Sawa as Shimizu
- Hikaka Ueda as Uno
- Tadashi Suganuma as Sanada
- Hiroshi Kawai as Haraguchi
- Toshi Akiyama as Ohtomo
- Kōsaku Okano as Tamaru
- Hōsei Komatsu as Kanayama
- Keiroku Seki as Tako
- Kōya Satō as Hide
- Kōji Miemachi as Bora
- Keiichi Kitagawa as Yoshikawa
- Yukiko Anjō as Wife of Koike
- Eiji Okada as Riichirō Maejima

== Production ==
Bakuto kaisanshiki is the sixth film in the Bakuto (Gambler) series of films that was produced by Toei Studios and starred Koji Tsuruta (except for the film Gambler Clan, which starred Ken Takakura in his place). Fukasaku later also directed the ninth film in the Bakuto series, Bakuto Gaijin Butai (Sympathy for the Underdog) (1971).

The film was shot in color and in mono.

The film's title has also been translated as Gambler - Ceremony of Disbanding, Gamblers' Ceremony of Disbanding, Gamblers' Dissolution Ceremony, Gambler's Dispersion, Gamblers' Dispersion, and Gamblers Dispersion.

== Release ==
The film premiered in Japan on February 9, 1968.

== Home video ==
The film was released on DVD in Japan on August 9, 2013.
