= Bloodstained Clan Honor =

1970 Japanese film

- Theatrical release poster
- Directed by: Kinji Fukasaku
- Written by: Kinji Fukasaku; Makoto Naitō
- Starring: Bunta Sugawara; Tatsuo Umemiya
- Cinematography: Hanjirō Nakazawa
- Music by: Chūji Kinoshita
- Production company: Toei Tokyo
- Distributed by: Toei
- Release date: 1970
- Running time: 87 minutes
- Country: Japan
- Language: Japanese

Bloodstained Clan Honor (Japanese: 血染の代紋, Hepburn: Chi-zome no Daimon) is a 1970 Japanese yakuza film directed by Kinji Fukasaku.

== Plot ==
In the year 1965, with the post-WWII era now in the past, police crack down on the criminal organizations which had thrived during that turbulent era and numerous gangs are disbanded. Amid these conditions, 30-year-old Kensaku Gunji becomes the 4th head of the Hamayasu family operating in a small corner of the Port of Yokohama as a replacement for the acting head Tetsuji Kuroki, who is in prison.

The Hamayasu member Onuma is arrested under the Port Labor Act and shipping work comes to a standstill. Onuma's wife asks for help but it is Onuma's third arrest and it will be difficult. Iwakiri, the head of his own organization, asks whether Gunji wishes to get out of the shipping business and suggests grabbing part of the warehousing rights to a huge new factory complex of Oriental Heavy Industries. To do so, Gunji will have to clear out the people living in slums on the land where the factory complex will be built. Gunji refuses to clear out the slums where he was raised but is told that if he does not, the Daimon organization from Tokyo will do it. Gunji agrees but asks Kasama Tsutomu to resign so that Kasama will not have to evict the elderly from the slum where his parents live. Kasama refuses to quit and pledges to take charge of the eviction.

When Gunji attempts to talk with the people living in the slum, they become agitated and throw various objects, including a dead cat, at the Hamayasu. Kasama's father angrily criticizes him for joining the yakuza and now evicting them and his mother screams that she should have killed him at birth. A fistfight ensues but the Hamayasu are stopped by Hayami, an old friend of Gunji who abandoned the slum 12 years earlier to become a boxer but has now returned to defend it, taking refuge in a small boat dubbed the SS Black Dragon. Hayami is visited by Joe, a promising rookie boxer whose eye was injured in his last match but who escaped from the hospital because he could not afford to have his eye fixed. Hayami refuses to allow Joe to quit boxing and become a hustler, instead promising to get Joe the operation he needs so that Joe can live out the dreams Hayami lost when he himself had an eye injury.

The next morning the Hamayasu and Iwakiri gangs arrive together to destroy the livestock held in the slum and attack its inhabitants. Unable to go to the police due to their illegal squatting on the land, they barricade themselves inside the slum, which gives them defense but cuts them off from income. Three miners from Kyushu arrive in an attempt to pass themselves off as inhabitants of the slum and thereby collect the payment for leaving offered by Daimon Construction.

Tetsuji Kuroki is released from prison and returns to the Hamayasu. He visits a former lover who is now working as a waitress in a bar. She confesses that she has waited five years for him but he is resistant to letting her get involved with him again.

Hayama accepts money from the Daimon organization and allows them into the slum to pressure one of the families into selling by force. The next morning Kasama, Ozaki, and other members of the Hamayasu see Daimon soldiers arriving at the slum and attempt to stop them but are shown the deed of sale and beaten up after resisting. Gunji receives a letter or resignation from Kasama with his severed pinky finger in it as an apology. Kasama invades the Daimon Construction office to kill their boss Daimon himself but when he is captured he commits suicide by biting off his own tongue. The brutal bespectacled Daimon enforcer Katagiri tells Gunji to come alone to collect Kasama. Gunji shows them the letter and pinky to prove that Kasama acted on his own during the attack. The Daimon demand a 50% share of the warehousing rights to overlook the attack just as Kuroki arrives and fights them off, telling them that there will be blood spilled if they do not stop. Kasama's parents later come to collect the body from a tearful Gunji. The next morning their bodies are found hanging in their home after an apparent suicide. Two of the Kyushu miners flee out of fear but their leader, who is actually from Tokyo, remains in order to fight the yakuza.

Joe figures out that Hayami is collaborating with the Daimon and asks him to stop but Hayami refuses because he still needs more money for Joe's operation. Iwakiri visits the Daimon Construction office and offers to split the warehousing rights 50/50. Daimon soldiers kill the remaining miner and run over Joe with their cars during the escape, killing him. Hayami holds Joe as he dies and the other two miners return and cry over the body of their fallen friend. Hayami enters the Daimon Construction office and accuses them of the attack but they deny it. Hayami returns the money he has received and tells them that the deal is off.

The Daimon organization leads the slum dwellers to believe that the attack was by the Hamayasu and the slum dwellers attack the Hamayasu at their office in the Port of Yokohama. The tables are turned as the Hamayasu barricade themselves inside their office but the attackers set fire to the barricade to force them out. During the ensuing melee, Iwakiri soldiers sneak in and stab one of the miners to death. The police arrive and arrest all of the members of the Hamayasu for the stabbing. Hayami watches his old friend Gunji being driven away by the police. Kuroki reads about the arrest in the newspaper and visits Iwakiri, who insists that the members of his gang who were working with the Hamayasu had already left before the fight occurred. Daimon and Katagiri arrive during their meeting and Kuroki realizes that the two groups are working together. Kuroki swears to Iwakiri that Iwakiri will never get the warehousing rights. As he is leaving he is stabbed in the back but he manages to take vengeance by killing Iwakiri before being shot to death. He collapses to the floor with his final thoughts being of the waitress. The Daimon gang then shoots the rest of the Iwakiri gang to wrap things up.

Daimon Construction brings in its heavy machinery to destroy the shanties in the slum. The waitress pays Gunji's bail and they visit Kuroki's grave together. Hayami visits Gunji and they visit the destroyed slum, identifying the demolished SS Black Dragon. Realizing that they have been played like marionettes, they join together and attack the groundbreaking ceremony for the new factory complex. They stab Daimon to death but are then stabbed to death themselves by other members of the Daimon gang. The construction of the Oriental Heavy Industries factory complex is completed the following year. Japan's gross domestic product soon becomes the second-largest in the world, exceeded only by that of the United States.

== Cast ==
- Bunta Sugawara as Kensaku Gunji
- Tatsuo Umemiya
- Kōji Tsuruta as Tetsuji Kuroki
- Junko Miyazono
- Kyosuke Machida
- Fumio Watanabe
- Isamu Nagato as Taishō
- Asao Uchida
- Hōsei Komatsu
- Chideo Murota
- Nobuo Yana as Yabuki

== Production ==
The production design was by Hiroshi Kitagawa. The audio was recorded in mono.

== Release ==
The film was released in Japan in 1970. It was also released under the titles Bloodstained Crest, Bloody Gambles, Bloodstained Gang Crest, and Blood-Soaked Gang Crest.
