= Akihiro Miwa =

Japanese singer, actor, and drag queen (1935–2026)

- 美輪 明宏
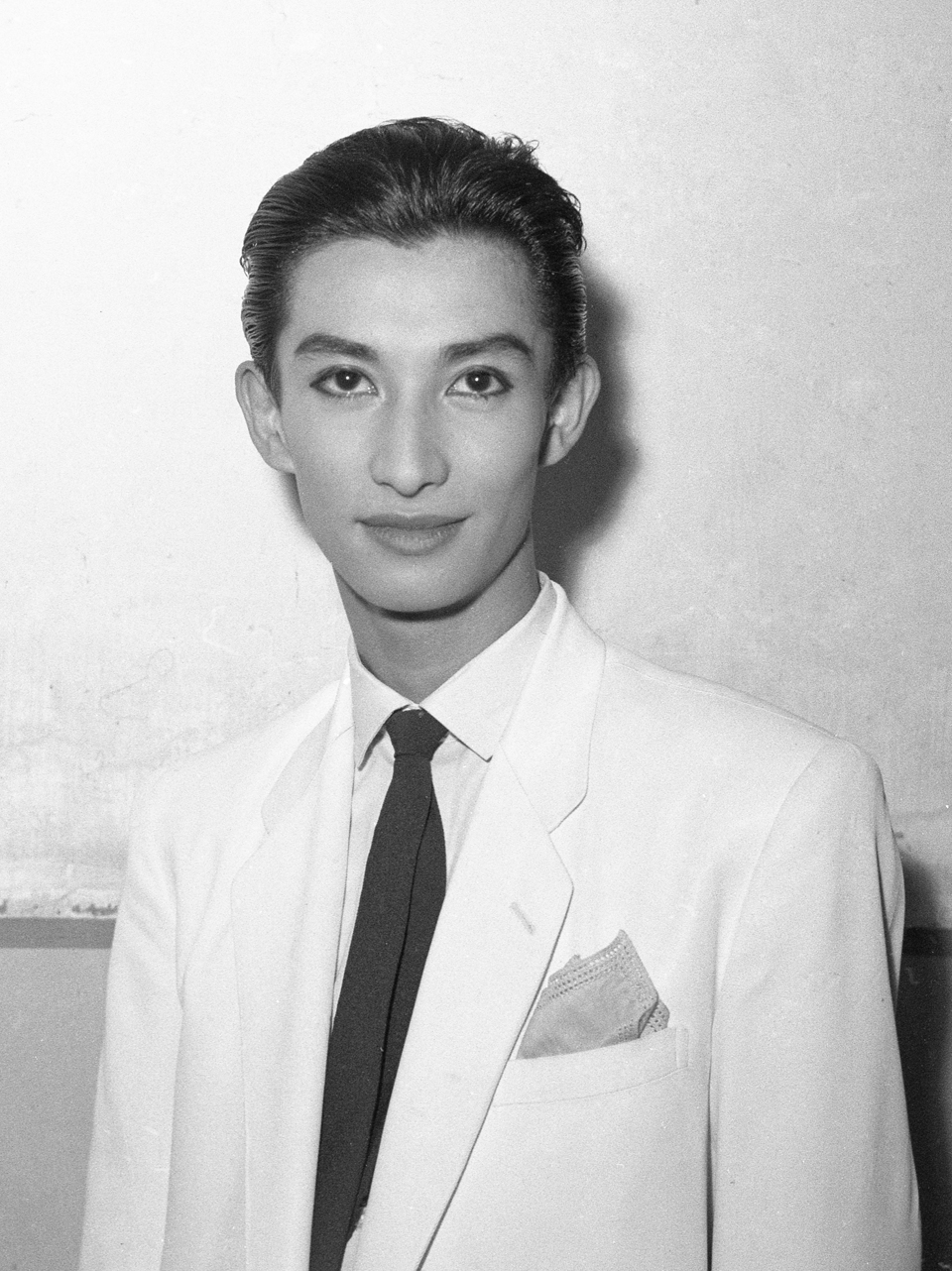
- Miwa in 1955
- Born: Akihiro Maruyama; May 15, 1935; Nagasaki, Japan
- Died: June 20, 2026 (aged 91)
- Other names: Shingo Maruyama; Akihiro Maruyama
- Occupations: Singer; drag queen; director; composer; author; actor

Akihiro Maruyama (丸山 明宏, Maruyama Akihiro; May 15, 1935 – June 20, 2026), better known by his stage name Akihiro Miwa (美輪 明宏, Miwa Akihiro), was a Japanese singer, actor, director, composer, author and drag queen. He appeared in the productions of Shūji Terayama, Tenjō Sajiki, Kinji Fukasaku, Yukio Mishima, and was a voice actor in two Hayao Miyazaki films.

== Early life ==
Akihiro Maruyama was born in Nagasaki on May 15, 1935, as one of ten siblings. His family operated a café and a restaurant. He attended Sako National Elementary school.

The epicenter of the atomic bombing of Nagasaki was 3.6 kilometers from Miwa's family's house. Miwa was drawing when the atomic bomb went off and he experienced an intense flash of light. The blast shook his house and caused the windows to explode. The family maid evacuated Miwa and his brother, seeking cover at the nearby Daitokuji air raid shelter as they worried further bombs might be dropped. The entire family later evacuated to Tadewara-machi. Following the explosion Miwa witnessed naked victims with their entire bodies covered in burns and people trapped under buildings. Miwa suffered from radiation exposure and developed anemia.

In junior high school Miwa's music teacher invited him to join a female soprano group. Miwa moved to Tokyo in 1951 after graduating from junior high school. He became a student at the National College of Music High School, but dropped out. When Miwa returned to Nagasaki he was angry that his father abandoned relatives who were financially struggling and his father disowned him after an argument. Miwa started working as a bartender after losing his family allowance.

== Career ==
=== Singing ===
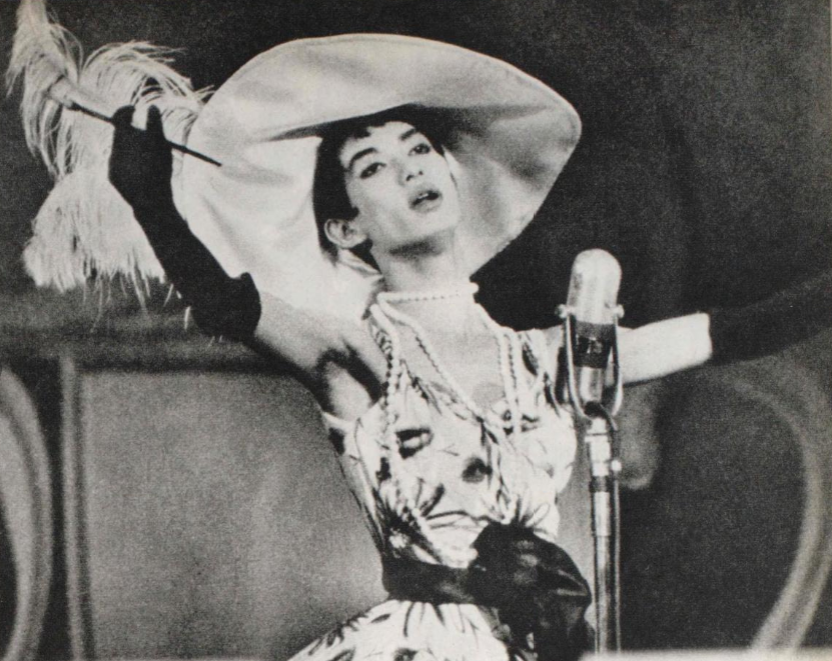
Miwa performing Mé Qué Mé Qué

At age 16, Miwa started his singing career at chanson cafes in Tokyo, becoming a resident singer at Ginpari in 1952. By the age of 17 he was working in cabaret at gay bars. He performed in the style of French singers Yvette Guilbert and Édith Piaf. Miwa began cross dressing in these shows and became known to the press as "the prettiest boy since Emperor Jimmu”. Miwa's cover of the French chanson song "Mé Qué Mé Qué" became a hit in 1957. He was noted for his entirely purple outfit.

Miwa was well known for their most popular song, "Yoitomake no Uta" which was released in 1965. Miwa later explained that the song was inspired by the mother of one of his classmates, who had an injured leg and worked on building sites. The phrase Yoitomake comes from the cry of "yoitto make", which roughly translates to "heave and wind it up" and it was often used as a chant on building sites.

=== Theatre and acting ===
On stage and film, Miwa appeared in the productions of Shūji Terayama, Tenjō Sajiki, and Yukio Mishima. A stage adaptation of Mishima's Five Modern Noh Plays starring and directed by Miwa was performed in 1996, 1998, and 2002.

Miwa was a voice actor for the Studio Ghibli films Princess Mononoke (1997) and Howl's Moving Castle (2004). He was the narrator for the television series Hanako to Anne.

From 2005 to 2010, he co-hosted the successful weekly television program Ōra no izumi (The spring of aura) alongside spiritual counsellor Hiroyuki Ehara and Tokio member Taichi Kokubun. While the show initially aired as late-night program, its popularity bumped it up to a primetime slot in 2007.

=== Writing ===
Miwa wrote columns and articles for multiple newspapers. From 2008 to 2011, he wrote a column for Sports Nippon. In 2012 he began writing a life advice column in The Asahi Shimbun titled Nayami no Rutsubo (The Crucible of Troubles).

=== Hibakusha advocacy ===
Survivors of the atomic bombs dropped on Japan were called Hibakusha. As a survivor of the bombing of Nagasaki, Miwa supported abolition of nuclear weapons. In 2021, he criticized the Japanese government over their refusal to sign the Treaty on the Prohibition of Nuclear Weapons. In 2025, Miwa narrated Nagasaki: In the Shadow of the Flash as the director, Junpei Matsumoto, wished to include the voice of a survivor in the film.

== Personal life ==
Miwa came out as gay in the 1960s. He was in a relationship with Yukio Mishima. Mishima's friendship with Miwa inspired Mishima to write Onnagata (1957).

Miwa was a follower of the Lotus Sutra. He changed his name from Maruyama to Miwa in 1972 after having an experience that he perceived as a divine message while reciting sutras. In 2000, during an interview with Tanba Tetsurō, Miwa declared that they were the reincarnation of Amakusa Shirō.

Miwa was hospitalized after suffering a mild stroke in 2019. He died on June 20, 2026.

== Filmography ==
=== Film ===
Year	Title	Role	Notes	Ref(s)
1968	Black Lizard	Black Lizard		
1969	Black Rose Mansion	Ryuko Fujio		
1971	Throw Away Your Books, Rally in the Streets			
1983	Genma Wars: Har-Magedon	Froy	Voice actor	
1997	Princess Mononoke	Moro	Voice actor	
2004	Howl's Moving Castle	Witch of the Waste	Voice actor	
2005	Takeshis'			
2009	Pokémon: Arceus and the Jewel of Life	Arceus	Voice actor	
2025	Nagasaki: In the Shadow of the Flash	Narrator		

=== Television ===
Year	Title	Role	Notes	Ref(s)
1980	Maeterlinck's Blue Bird	Queen of the Night	Voice actor	
2004	Ōra no Izumi	Co-host		
2014	Hanako to Anne	Narrator		

== Books ==
- Purple Résumé (Japanese: 紫の履歴書, 1968)
- Light for You - Akihiro Miwa’s “Heart and Beauty” Counselling (光をあなたに―美輪明宏の心麗相談, 1995)
- Life is Easy (生きるって簡単, 1996)
- Life Notebook (人生ノート, 1998)
- Heavenly Voice Beautiful Words (天声美語, 2000)
- To Live Strongly (強く生きるために, 2000)人生讃歌―愉しく自由に美しく、又のびやかに
- Ah, The Law of Plus and Minus (ああ正負の法則, 2002)
- Stories of Love, Stories of Happiness (愛の話 幸福の話, 2002)
- Ping-Pong-Pan: A Conversation Between Two (ぴんぽんぱん ふたり話, 2003)
- How to Turn Hell into Heaven (地獄を極楽にする方法, 2003)
- Spirits Aren't Scary At All (霊ナァンテコワクナイヨー, 2004)
- A Hymn to Life - Joyful, Free, Beautiful, and Unrestricted (人生讃歌―愉しく自由に美しく、又のびやかに, 2004)
- The School of Life: Ultimate Guide (人生学校虎の巻, 2005)
- War and Peace: A Message of Love (戦争と平和 愛のメッセージ, 2005)
- Akihiro Miwa's Grand Encyclopedia of Style (美輪明宏のおしゃれ大図鑑, 2005)
- Musings on Social Reform (世なおしトークあれこれ, 2007)
- The School of Life: Ultimate Guide (Continued) (続・人生学校虎の巻, 2008)
- A Maiden's Classroom (乙女の教室, 2008)
- Language of flowers (花言葉, 2010)
- The Laws of Love and Beauty (愛と美の法則, 2009)
- Slicing Right Through Worries and Suffering! (悩みも苦しみもメッタ斬り！, 2011)
- For a Bright Tomorrow (明るい明日を, 2012)
- Life is Okay, Don't Worry (人生はドンマイドンマイ, 2013)
- Life Advice for Living with Greater Ease (楽に生きるための人生相談, 2015)
- Turn the Storm in Your Heart into a Blue Sky (心の嵐を青空に, 2016)
- Bargain Sale Love (愛の大売り出し, 2018)
- Life Advice for Living Peacefully (おだやかに生きるための人生相談, 2019)
- Keep Smiling. Let's Go With a Spring in Our Step (ほほえみを忘れずに。ルンルンでいきましょう, 2020)
- My Philosophy on Life: Don't Judge by Appearances (私の人生論 目に見えるものは見なさんな, 2024)
- Love Advice Corner (愛のモヤモヤ相談室, 2024)
- Words of Miwa (美輪ことば, 2024)
- This World Is a School of Life (この世は人生学校, 2025)
- To You, Living Through the Reiwa Era: Miwa-chama’s Talks on a Brilliant Future for the Next Generation 20 (令和を生きぬく貴方たちへ 未来世代が輝くミワちゃま語り２０, 2025)
- A Generous Dose of Happiness (幸せの大盤振る舞い, 2026)
- Advice for Living with a Smile (ほほえんで生きるための人生相談, 2026)

== Works cited ==
- Jannarone, Kimberly, ed. (2015). Vanguard Performance Beyond Left and Right. University of Michigan Press. ISBN 9780472119677.
- Stewart, William (1995). Cassell's Queer Companion: A Dictionary of Lesbian and Gay Life and Culture. Cassell. ISBN 030434303X.
- Suter, Rebecca (2015). Holy Ghosts: The Christian Century in Modern Japanese Fiction. University of Hawaiʻi Press. ISBN 9780824840013.
