= Kamikaze Man: Duel at Noon =

1966 Japanese crime film

- Film poster
- Directed by: Kinji Fukasaku
- Written by: Kinji Fukasaku; Yuichi Ikeda; Koji Ota
- Starring: Ken Takakura; Sonny Chiba
- Cinematography: Yoshikazu Yamazawa
- Music by: Masao Yagi
- Production companies: Kokko Eigyo; Ninjin Club
- Distributed by: Toei Company
- Release date: June 4, 1966 (Japan)
- Running time: 90 minutes
- Country: Japan
- Languages: Japanese; Taiwanese

Kamikaze Man: Duel at Noon (Japanese: カミカゼ野郎 真昼の決斗, Hepburn: Kamikaze yarō: Mahiru no kettō), also known as The Kamikaze Guy and The Kamikaze Guy: Duel at High Noon, is a 1966 Japanese crime action comedy film directed by Kinji Fukasaku and starring Sonny Chiba. This was the second film shot by Fukasaku in color, the first being Gang vs. G-Men (1962).

== Plot ==
Three men involved with the murder of a Taiwanese man receive threatening letters signed with the initials K.M. and a skull. The first recipient, Mr. Yajima, is killed on a ski slope and the prime suspect is the Tokyo pilot Ken Mitarai, also known as "Mr. Toilet". Ballistics clear him, but a diviner tells him that he will travel to Taiwan and the next day he receives a mysterious booking from the dead man Mr. Yajima to fly an MU-2 to Taiwan. The Taiwanese photographer & journalist Koran flies along with him and in the airplane they discover the diviner's body in a trunk belonging to Tianci Rai, the President of Taiwan Tourism and another recipient of the threatening letter.

Upon arriving, they are attacked by Rai's men but manage to escape. Ken is dragged into a brothel, where a kind worker allows him to spend the night. The next day, Ken attempts to leave the country but receives a note from Mr. Kitazawa, the final recipient of the threatening letter, to meet him at the Confucius Temple. Once there, he is told by Mr. Kitazawa that Mr. Kitazawa received the same note, leading them to believe that another attack is imminent. Mr. Kitazawa leaves and his car explodes immediately thereafter.

Koran and Ken confront President Rai, who drugs their drinks to knock them out with plans to have them die in a staged plane crash, but they are saved by a rival journalist of Koran's named Fumio Kuroki, who informs them that the murders relate to 20 billion yen in diamonds seized during the Japanese occupation of Taiwan. Koran and Ken visit a funeral march for Mr. Kitazawa, where they are spotted by President Rai, who sends men to eliminate them. Ken allows them to believe that they have run him and Koran off the road into a gorge, but they secretly hide in the men's trunk, gaining them access to President Rai's hideout, where Koran learns that they are heading to Hell Valley.

President Rai and his men dig up the stolen gems from their hiding spot in Hell Valley but then Rai's assistant Fengying shoots the men and it is revealed that she has been working with Mr. Kitazawa, who faked his own death. They kill President Rai and escape in separate cars. Mr. Kitazawa accidentally kills Fengying while attempting to kill Ken, then escapes into the MU-2 and attempts to smuggle the gems back to Japan. Ken jumps onto the plane and climbs inside while it is in the air, then overpowers Mr. Kitazawa and throws him out.

Ken Mitarai is given a medal at a ceremony in Taiwan, after which Fumio Kuroki admits to him that he is actually the son of the murdered man. Ken and Koran take a flight back to Japan, but when it is announced that the plane will be returning to Taiwan due to bad weather, Ken parachutes out of the plane to avoid returning.

== Cast ==
- Sonny Chiba as Ken Mitarai
- Minoru Ōki as Mr. Kitazawa
- Ken Takakura as Fumio Kuroki
- Gōzō Sōma
- Hideo Murota as detective
- Pailan as Koran
- Hiroko Kuni
- Ririko Sawa

== Marketing ==
German poster bearing the title K.M. Hunts Phoenix and the announcement "The first major film of a sensational new series"

The film was marketed as the first of what was planned to be a series of multiple Kamikaze Man films, much in the way that Kinji Fukasaku and Sonny Chiba had previously worked together on multiple Drifting Detective and Hepcat in the Funky Hat films. However, no further films were produced featuring the character Ken Mitarai.

== Reception ==
Reviewer Hayley Scanlon of windowsonworlds.com wrote, "A vehicle for rising star Chiba, the film was intended as the first in a series starring its bumbling hero, Ken Mitarai, though no other instalments were ever produced. In any case, it seems to echo the lighter side of Nikkatsu's borderless action line along with Toho’s spy spoofs in its wrong man tale of wartime legacy and corporate duplicity. "

Reviewer Wally Adams of easternkicks.com gave the film three and a half out of five stars, writing that both Chiba and Fukasaku "went the extra mile to create both one of the better-aged and better-staged among Japanese spy craze movies; a highly pleasant and likable caper representing the innocent fun and optimism of its era from about the very last two people that would come to be associated with it."
