= Black Lizard (film) =

- Film poster
- Directed by: Kinji Fukasaku
- Screenplay by: Masashige Narusawa; Kinji Fukasaku
- Based on: The play 黒蜥蜴 by Yukio Mishima
- Produced by: Akira Oda
- Starring: Akihiro Miwa; Isao Kimura; Kikko Matsuoka; Junya Usami
- Cinematography: Hiroshi Dowaki
- Edited by: Keiichi Uraoka
- Music by: Isao Tomita
- Production company: Shochiku
- Release date: 14 August 1968 (Japan)
- Running time: 86 minutes
- Country: Japan

Black Lizard (Japanese: 黒蜥蝪, Hepburn: Kurotokage) is a 1968 Japanese film directed by Kinji Fukasaku. The film is based on a play by Yukio Mishima, which in turn is based on a novel by Rampo Edogawa. The play had previously been adapted to film in 1962 by director Umetsugu Inoue.

== Plot ==
Shobei Iwase is a jeweler whose daughter Sanae works as a hostess at a club. Mrs. Midorikawa visits Sanae and introduces her to Yamakawa, young businessman from Tokyo. When they visit his room to look at a wedding doll, he chloroforms Sanae and stuffs her into a trunk.

Detective Akechi explains that Yamakawa was actually a depressed man named Junichi Amamiya who was convinced by Black Lizard to kidnap Sanae. Suspecting this, Akechi sends his men to follow Amamiya and he successfully recovers Sanae. Akechi explains that Mrs. Midorikawa is actually Black Lizard in disguise. Black Lizard dresses in men's clothing to escape the hotel unnoticed.

Sanae is told to stay in her room at her father's house, but his housekeeper Hina works to kidnap her along with another worker. Iwase's guard Matobe attempts to intervene but they cut off his hand, leaving blood all over Iwase's new sofa. Iwase demands the removal of the sofa, which his employees arrange while sneaking out Sanae in a hidden compartment underneath its seat.

Black Lizard sends a note promising the return of Sanae in exchange for the Star of Egypt, a South African gem worth 120 million yen that is Iwase's prized possession. Iwase brings the gem to Black Lizard at New Shinonome pier at noon on August 4 as requested and Black Lizard lies that Sanae will be returned to him that night.

Black Lizard takes Sanae on a ship to a private island but hears Akechi speaking from the sofa's hidden compartment so Black Lizard thrusts a sword through it and orders the sofa thrown overboard. Akechi was actually hiding in the closet and appears before Black Lizard disguised as the old sailor Matsukichi.

On the island, Black Lizard presents her collection of human bodies perfectly preserved as statues. Junichi Amamiya attempts to help Sanae escape but is caught and thrown in a cell with her, where she confesses that she is a woman named Yoko Sakurayana hired to be Sanae's double and he confesses that he got caught on purpose in order to be turned into one of Black Lizard's dolls to stay with her and be caressed by her forever. Junichi and Yoko fall in love.

Black Lizard reads a newspaper article that Sanae has already been returned to her father and is infuriated. Akechi summons the police and reveals himself to Black Lizard. He frees Junichi and Yoko and lets them leave to live their life together. Hina attempts to throw a poisonous snake at Akechi but Black Lizard stops her by impaling her with a sword before running to her room. Akechi reveals that Black Lizard killed the real Matsukichi in the sofa compartment and Black Lizard reveals that she has consumed poison, whereupon she dies.

== Cast ==
- Akihiro Maruyama as "Black Lizard", disguised as Mrs. Midorikawa
- Isao Kimura as Detective Kogorō Akechi
- Kikko Matsuoka as Sanae Iwase
- Junya Usami as Shobei Iwase
- Yûsuke Kawazu as Junichi Amamiya
- Kō Nishimura as Private Detective Keiji Matoba
- Toshiko Kobayashi as Hina
- Sonosuke Oda as Harada
- Kinji Hattori as Toyama
- Kyōichi Satō as Ohkawa
- Jun Katō as Sakai
- Ryūji Funakoshi as Kōzu
- Mitsuko Takara as Show Dancer
- Tetsurō Tamba as Kuroki
- Yukio Mishima as a taxidermic Japanese human specimen

== Release ==
Black Lizard was released in Japan in August 1968. Fukasaku stated the film was very popular and successful on its initial release. He added that Shochiku had offered him a chance to direct a follow-up that would also star Maruyama.

In the United States, it was theatrically released by Shochiku Films of America with English subtitles in July 1969, with an 86-minute running time. The film was not widely distributed in the United States until it was reissued by Cinevista with English subtitles in February 1985, with an 83-minute running time.
