= Junko Miyazono =

Japanese actress (born 1943)

- 宮園 純子
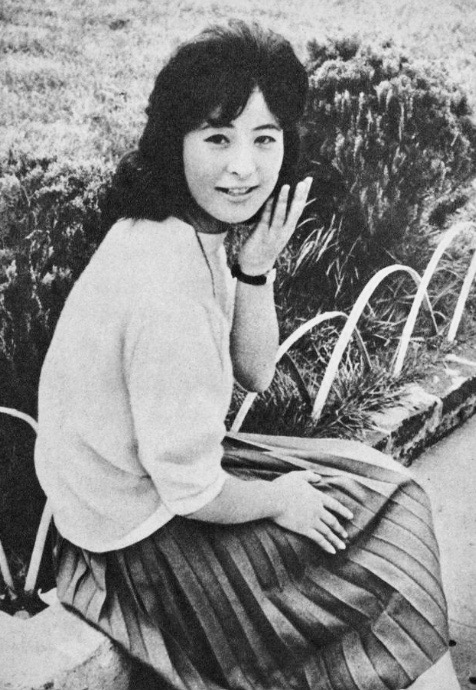
- From the November 1963 special edition of "Shosetsu Club"
- Born: 30 May 1943 (age 83)
- Occupation: actress
- Years active: 1960–present

Junko Miyazono (宮園 純子, born 30 May 1943) is a Japanese actress.

In 1960, Miyazano passed Toei's 7th "New Faces" audition, a process that began the careers of many famous Japanese film stars. Akemi Misawa, Yuriko Mishima, and Yuki Mieko and a few others also passed the audition that year.

In 2004, Miyazono featured in actress, politician, and singer Tamaki Sawa's omnibus album, "Sawa Tamaki & Play Girl Music Collection." Miyazano's song is titled "A Woman's Justice" (女の仁義).

== Filmography ==
Year	Title	Role	Director	Ref.
1965	Flower and Dragon		Kōsaku Yamashita	
1966	Samurai Wolf		Hideo Gosha	
1966	Eleven Samurai		Eiichi Kudo	
1966	Honor Among Brothers	Kuni	Kōsaku Yamashita	
1966	Family Obligations 2		Kōsaku Yamashita	
1967	The Chivalrous Life	Nami Mikami	Masahiro Makino	
1967	Dissolution Rites		Kinji Fukasaku	
1967	The Gambler's Law		Noribumi Suzuki	
1968	The Enchanting Poisonous Woman: O-Hyaku	O-Hyaku	Yoshihiro Ishikawa	
1968	Tales of the Inner Chamber		Kōsaku Yamashita	
1968	Enlisted Yakuza		Kiyoshi Saeki	
1969	Okatsu the Fugitive		Nobuo Nakagawa	
1969	Quick-Draw Okatsu		Nobuo Nakagawa	
1969	Delinquent Boss-Ocho, The She Wolf		Yukio Noda	
