= Violent Panic: The Big Crash =

- Theatrical release poster
- Directed by: Kinji Fukasaku
- Written by: Kinji Fukasaku; Fumio Kōnami; Yasuzo Tanaka
- Starring: Tsunehiko Watase; Miki Sugimoto
- Cinematography: Tōru Nakajima
- Music by: Toshiaki Tsushima
- Production company: Toei
- Distributed by: Toei
- Release date: February 28, 1976
- Running time: 85 minutes
- Country: Japan
- Language: Japanese

Violent Panic: The Big Crash (Japanese: 暴走パニック 大激突, Hepburn: Boso Panikku: Dai Gekitotsu), also known as Great Collision, is a 1976 Japanese heist film directed by Kinji Fukasaku.

== Plot ==
Two masked bank robbers, Seki Mitsuo and Yamanaka Takashi, use stolen cars to steal millions of yen from banks in Nagoya, Otsu, and Kyoto before heading to Kobe, where they plan to rob 300 million yen from the Dai-ichi Kangin Bank on Nitta Street before escaping to Brazil.

Takashi and Mitsuo rob the bank but as they are escaping Seki Mitsuo is knocked over by a motorcycle then run over by a truck. Takashi evades the police of the Hyōgo in his escape car before ditching it and taking a taxi back to his place. Officer Kuriyama finds the abandoned car and the ambitious Officer Nitta hurriedly searches through the documents found in it while the jealous Officer Hatano spends his time hitting on Kuriyama.

Takashi continues to have problems with Midorikawa Michi, a girl whom Takashi saved from a man attacking her at a bar one night and who then became his lover, because he has to pay for expensive clothing she shoplifts and she then begins prostituting herself for nice clothes. Takashi is angered, but decides that it doesn't matter because he is planning to leave anyway.

The police identify the body of the dead robber as former mechanic Seki Mitsuo, age 26, leading them to search his apartment and find links to all of the other robberies as well as the fingerprints of his accomplice, who is now being pursued by all of the police departments of the various cities working together. Seki Mitsuo's brother, a corrupt cop, finds Takashi and demands the money from the Kobe robbery. He jumps on Takashi's truck as he attempts to flee the city, falling off when the police cut them off. Takashi turns down another road only to encounter by Michi, who jumps in the truck. Hatano, struck by the car as they drive away, cannot remember what the driver looked like but Nitta matches the fingerprints to the bartender Yamanaka Takashi, age 26, and identifies him as the other masked robber.

Takashi abandons Michi at a cafe but she chases after him in tears and he lets her ride with him in a taxi. Nitta travels to Takashi's birthplace in Fukui and Hatano invents an excuse to avoid accompanying him, instead traveling to Kuriyama's home, where he is taunted by her neighbors for being a cop and discovers her in bed with a subordinate officer.

In Echizen, Fukui Nitta finds the dilapidated Yamanata family home, abandoned after Takashi's breadwinner older brother injured his arm and the family fell into poverty, moving to Hanba, Osaka. The police track Takashi there, where he gives his poor family 100,000 yen before escaping. Mitsuo's brother the corrupt cop learns from one of Michi's old johns that Takashi is with Michi but then angrily kills the drunk john when only presented with a photograph instead of the real Michi.

A young man working at a car repair shop works a racket where he delivers a repaired car then scratches it again before leaving. He is observed escaping by the car's owner, who returns to the shop and threatens to report him to the police, driving him to a hotel room to be the subject of the man's sadistic sex games. The young man murders the aggressor but is heard by the neighbors, prompting the police to ask for statements from them, including Michi and Takashi in the neighboring room. Takashi hides his face under soap and after the police leave Michi finds his passport. After an argument she steals it and flees as the young murderer flees and crashes the older man's nice car off a cliff.

Takashi calls Michi at the bar and Mitsuo's brother overhears the conversation, realizing that Takashi is headed to Brazil. Takashi retrieves the passport and heads to the airport, where Mitsuo's brother catches him. They fight over the bag of money but are forced to abandon it when airport security chases them away. Takashi returns to the hotel and finds that Michi has attempted to kill herself with pills. He forces her to vomit then burns his passport, confessing that he has lost the money and promising to get her more.

Takashi robs Sumitomo Bank but the police do not hear the alarm over the loud music from the street demonstration that they are escorting nearby. Hanato and Mitsuo's brother both notice Takashi escaping and pursue him. Hanato strikes several other people's vehicles during the pursuit, causing them to chase him. Takashi throws the bag of money out of his car to Michi, who cowers in the road as Hanato's car is struck by the cars pursuing him. After the crash she continues to chase Takashi, who turns around and picks her up before continuing his escape. Mitsuo's brother crashes into the nice car stolen by the young murderer, who angrily chases after him but is struck dead by Hanato's car, angering several onlookers and causing them to chase Hanato in their cars. Mitsuo's brother runs into a group of professional motorcyclists being filmed for television and kills one of them, causing the rest to chase after him. The cars all crash together in a massive cluster further down the road as the television reporter describes the scene as "a cross-section of today's society running wild." Hanato's car is overturned by angry citizens and several other cars explode or drive into the water as Takashi and Michi escape by boat. It is later reported that a Japanese couple has robbed the bank of Rio de Janeiro and escaped with $500,000 in cash.

== Cast ==
- Tsunehiko Watase
- Miki Sugimoto
- Yayoi Watanabe
- Hideo Murota
- Takuzō Kawatani
- Ryō Nishida

== Release ==
Film Movement released Violent Panic: The Big Crash in North America digitally on September 27, 2024. For the Blu-ray release, the company bundled it together with another Fukasaku film, Wolves, Pigs and Men.
