= Outlaw Killers: Three Mad Dog Brothers =

- Theatrical release poster
- Directed by: Kinji Fukasaku
- Written by: Fumio Konami; Hiro Mutsuda
- Starring: Bunta Sugawara; Kunie Tanaka
- Cinematography: Hanjirō Nakazawa
- Music by: Toshiaki Tsushima
- Production company: Toei Tokyo
- Distributed by: Toei
- Release date: October 25, 1972
- Running time: 86 minutes
- Country: Japan
- Language: Japanese

Outlaw Killers: Three Mad Dog Brothers (Japanese: 人斬り与太・狂犬三兄弟, Hepburn: Hito-kiri Yota: Kyoken San-kyodai) is a 1972 Japanese yakuza film directed by Kinji Fukasaku.

== Plot ==
Gondo, a member of the Murai Family, stabs and kills the head of the rival Shinsei Group then turns himself in and serves out a six-year sentence in Gunma Prison. He expects a hero's reception when he is released but instead finds that only his sworn brother Ohno, who was with him during the stabbing, is waiting for him outside. Gondo is dismayed to see that members of the Shinsei Group are still operating in town and when he learns that Murai has made peace with the Shinsei Group he feels that his years in prison were spent in vain. Murai gives Gondo some money to get started again, which Gondo uses at a club run by Shiga, a member of the Shinsei Group whose face he slashed during the attack six years earlier. They get into a fight and Satake, the new head of the Shinsei Group, threatens to end the truce and return to war between the gangs. Murai explains the truce to Gondo and tells him not to cause any trouble in the territory run by the Shinsei Group. Shiga threatens to leave the Shinsei Group in order to have the freedom to kill Gondo outside of the truce but is told by Satake not to take out one small soldier when they could take down the entire Murai Family instead.

Gondo's violent nature alienates him from the other members of the Murai Family, who (apart from his loyal sworn brother Ohno) refuse to lend him money. They take over an unreported whorehouse by force by raping the owner and begin running it on their own by kidnapping women and forcing them to have sex with customers. While gambling on Shinsei turf, Gondo meets a homeless old man named Taichi who uses a snake to scare other gangsters and hires the man as his bodyguard. Satake orders Shiga to investigate where Gondo is getting his money. Gondo takes a liking to a new girl Ohno has brought in and rapes her, discovering afterwards that she was a virgin. She repeatedly fights off customers and attempts to escape so Gondo takes all of her clothes and boards up her windows. Shiga discovers Gondo's forceful methods with the girls and expresses his disgust to him. He tells Satake, who tells Adachi to discretely inform a detective, hoping to use their leverage to turn Gondo against the Murai Family. Tired of the new girl's antics, Gondo gives her a new dress and tells her to leave, but when she does she aimlessly wanders the streets. Shigeru tells Gondo to speak with Murai, who tells Gondo that the police are investigating him based on a time from the Shinsei Group and orders Gondo to shut down the whorehouse and destroy all evidence of it. Unable to return to work now that her factory has closed, the new girl is brought back by Taichi to Gondo at the closed whorehouse.

A businessman in debt to the Shinsei Group for 3 million yen asks Gondo for help. When Adachi threatens to sell the man's daughter to recover his debts, Gondo attacks Adachi and his men and forces them out. When the businessman refuses to pay them 500,000 yen for their efforts, they threaten to force his daughter into prostitution, at which point the man pays the money. As they are leaving they are attacked by a group of Shinsei soldiers who catch and kill Taichi and his snake. Gondo is told to cut off his pinky as an apology but instead stabs his entire hand, causing Shigeru to vomit. Satake is unsatisfied and leaves after demanding further compensation. Gondo offers to kill Satake but Murai suspends him and Ohno until the matter is settled. Gondo is taken back home but when Ohno refuses to allow him to drink, fearing that he will not stop bleeding if he does, Gondo hits him and tells him to leave. Ohno leaves and Gondo is left with the new girl.

Despite his injury, Gondo confronts Shiga outside a club and they fight with knives in the rain before Gondo beats Shiga to death with a metal pipe. Gondo brings home a prostitute and they have sex in front of the new girl, who disappears during the night, leaving behind the dress he bought for her. Shinsei soldiers arm themselves but Satake refuses to let them take revenge because the cops are investigating the murder. Murai visits Satake and gives money as an apology, also promising that he has already planned to have Gondo killed. Murai threatens to kick Ohno out of the gang if he does not kill Gondo but Ohno informs Gondo of the plot and they join forces again. Ohno attempts to steal his brother's truck and his mother's cash savings but is beaten to death by them. Gondo finds Murai and tells him about Ohno, saying that a parent shouldn't kill their child. He then shoots Murai to death but is shot by other members of the gang while fleeing. He is seen by Shinsei soldiers hiding in an abandoned movie theater but they are told by Satake not to kill him but rather to inform the rest of the Murai instead. The members of the Murai Family find Gondo and shoot him to death. The new girl watches from outside as the police carry out Gondo's corpse. Months later she gives birth to his child.

== Cast ==
- Bunta Sugawara as Gondo
- Kunie Tanaka
- Mayumi Nagisa
- Yōko Mihara
- Noboru Mitani
- Fumio Watanabe
- Kenji Imai
- Asao Uchida
- Fujio Suga
- Kōji Fujiyama as Adachi
- Chie Kobayashi
- Nenji Kobayashi
- Yasuko Matsui
- Hideo Murota
- Kin Sugai

== Production ==
The production design was by Hiroshi Kitagawa. The audio was recorded in mono.

== Release ==
Outlaw Killers: Three Mad Dog Brothers was released in Japan on October 25, 1972. It has also been released under the titles The Code of the Killer: Three Mad Dog Brothers, Modern Yakuza - Outlaw Killer, and Outlaw Killer: Three Maddog Brothers.
