= The Classroom of Terror =

1976 film

- DVD cover

Japanese name
- Kanji: 暴力教室
Transcriptions
- Revised Hepburn: Bōryoku kyōshitsu
- Directed by: Akihisa Okamoto
- Starring: Yūsaku Matsuda; Hiroshi Tachi; Tetsuro Tamba
- Music by: Shunsuke Kikuchi
- Production company: Toei Company
- Release date: July 1, 1976 (Japan)
- Running time: 85 minutes
- Country: Japan
- Language: Japanese

The Classroom of Terror (Japanese: 暴力教室, Hepburn: Bōryoku kyōshitsu; lit. 'Violence Classroom'), is a 1976 Japanese film directed by Akihisa Okamoto (岡本明久). It was Hiroshi Tachi's first starring role.

== Plot ==
Mizoguchi is an ex-boxer who killed an opponent during a fight. He is brought into a school to deal with a gang of disruptive students led by Kitajo.

== Cast ==
- Yūsaku Matsuda as Mizoguchi
- Hiroshi Tachi as Kitajo
- Yukari Yamamoto
- Maria Anzai
- Kazumi Murakami
- Hideo Murota as math teacher
- Nenji Kobayashi as Odagiri
- Tetsuro Tamba as father of Kitajo
