= Zero Woman: Red Handcuffs =

- Film poster
- Directed by: Yukio Noda
- Screenplay by: Hiroo Matsuda; Fumio Konami
- Based on: Zeroka no Onna by Tōru Shinohara
- Starring: Miki Sugimoto; Eiji Go; Hideo Murota; Tetsuro Tamba
- Music by: Shunsuke Kikuchi
- Distributed by: Toei
- Release date: May 21, 1974 (Japan)
- Running time: 88 minutes
- Country: Japan
- Language: Japanese

Zero Woman: Red Handcuffs (Japanese: 0課の女 赤い手錠) is a 1974 Japanese Toei's "pinky violence" style of pink film. Directed by Yukio Noda. Based on Tōru Shinohara's manga "Zeroka no Onna".

== Plot ==
Division 0 is a secret department that does not belong to any of the Investigation Divisions at the Police Department. Rei was a detective of Division 0, but she was sent to jail for killing a person who killed her close friend. Kyoko, daughter of the next prime minister's candidate, Zengo Nagumo, has been kidnapped. Rei is released on condition that she helps Kyoko safely.

== Cast ==
- Miki Sugimoto as Rei (Zero Woman)
- Tetsuro Tamba as Nagumo Zengo
- Hideo Murota as Hidaka Masashi
- Eiji Go as Nakahara Yoshihide
- Ichirō Araki as Seki Saburo
- Rokkō Toura as Tani
- Akira Kume as Inoue
- Yōko Mihara as Yano Kazuko
- Kōji Fujiyama as Chief Mishima
- Ralph Jesser as Richard Saxon
