= Gang vs. G-Men =

1962 Japanese crime film

- Japanese: ギャング対Ｇメン
- Directed by: Kinji Fukasaku
- Written by: Akira Murao (as Sakae Tajima)
- Produced by: Shigeru Okada
- Starring: Kōji Tsuruta
- Cinematography: Yoshikazu Yamazawa
- Music by: Kōichi Kawabe
- Distributed by: Toei Company
- Release date: November 2, 1962 (Japan)
- Running time: 82 minutes
- Country: Japan
- Language: Japanese

Gang vs. G-Men (Japanese: ギャング対Ｇメン, Hepburn: Gyangu tai G-men) is a 1962 Japanese color crime thriller film directed by Kinji Fukasaku starring Kōji Tsuruta, Shinichi Chiba, and Tetsurō Tamba. In an interview with Chris Desjardins contained in the book Outlaw Masters of Japanese Film, Fukasaku called the film "the story of an ex-yakuza who becomes an undercover policeman."

== Plot ==
Unable to make and headway in a case, Detective Ogawa asks former yakuza member Ryoji Tojima to go undercover to obtain more information. This would mean pretending to return to the yakuza in order to investigate the former yakuza Tatsumura, who now presents himself as a legitimate businessman but is suspected to still be involved in crime. Tojima is reluctant to return to the world of the yakuza at first but ends up agreeing after his friend is beaten. His nephew Osamu is eager to join in but Tojima refuses his help. Tojima assembles a crew with criminal backgrounds and special skills to take on the job. Together they investigate several clubs and bars owned by Tatsumura to determine if he has undeclared sources of income from crime. Tojima is almost killed outside of one of the clubs but is saved by Masao Kuroki, the younger brother of a man Tojima killed five years earlier, because Kuroki wants kill Tojima himself. Kuroki decides to accompany Tojima during his investigation of Tatsumura in order to protect his intended target. Tojima and his men eventually discover that the establishments owned by Tatsamura are fronts for an illegal moonshine operation at work. Meanwhile, Osamu recklessly takes it upon himself to investigate further and ends up captured by Tatsumura's men, who also kidnap Tojima's wife. Tojima struggles to find a way to take down Tatsumura while also protecting his loved ones.

== Cast ==
- Kōji Tsuruta as Ryoji Tojima
- Tatsuo Umemiya as Masao Kuroki
- Shinichi Chiba as Osamu Kaji
- Yoshiko Sakuma as Akiko Mizuno
- Tetsurō Tamba as Jūgo Tatsumura
- Harumi Sone as Goro Ishihara
- Junkichi Orimoto as Yuichi Noguchi
- Hideo Sunazuka as Mamoru Matsushima
- Tamaki Sawa as Naomi
- Takashi Kanda as Inspector Fujikawa
- Yoshi Katō as Detective Ogata
- Nakajirō Tomita as Takeji Maeda
- Shunji Kasuga as Yoshio Murakami
- Ken Sawaaki as Seiji Shimazu
- Mitsuo Ando as Torahiko Tanimoto
- Nobuo Yana
- Jūshirō Kobayashi as Saichi Sakura
- Isamu Yamaguchi as Suzumoto group boss
- Koji Miemachi
- Akira Kuji
- Akira Katayama as "Castle of the Night" club master
- Genji Kawai
- Satoshi Akiyama

== Production ==
Gang vs. G-Men is the fourth in the Gyangu series of films and the first in the series to be directed by Fukasaku. Fukasaku went on to also direct the seventh film in the series, League of Gangsters (1963).

Gang vs. G-Men was the first film shot by Fukasaku in color.

== Sequel ==
The film was followed by a sequel, Gyangu tai G-men: Shudan kinko yaburi, sometimes known in English as Gang vs. G-Men 2, that was released February 23, 1963. The sequel was directed by Teruo Ishii.

== Reception, analysis, and legacy ==
Yukio Mishima, a close friend of Okada, often came to Toei's preview room. He also previewed Gang vs. G-Men and praised it. Years later, when Fukasaku was directing Mishima's play Black Lizard, he said to Mishima, "You praised Gang vs. G-Men, which saved my neck."

The film was a hit, and the company's confidence in Fukasaku, which had been falling, was restored.

In the book Historical Dictionary of Japanese Cinema, author Jasper Sharp writes that, along with Wolves, Pigs and Men and Greed in Broad Daylight, "Gang vs. G-Men (Gyangu tai G-men, 1962), in which a disparate group of former criminals are assembled by the police to take on a vicious gang [ . . . ] established Fukasaku's pattern for contemporary action and crime dramas inspired by the French New Wave and American noir, featuring realistic portrayals of violence and often set in chaotic, working-class milieux."

Kimihiko Kamata of eiganokuni.com wrote, "The all-star movie Gang vs. G-Men, spearheaded by Shigeru Okada himself, the director of Toei Tokyo Studio, is a nostalgic G-Men movie inspired by the American TV drama The Untouchables."
