= Rampaging Dragon of the North =

1966 Japanese action film

- Japanese DVD cover
- Japanese: 北海の暴れ竜
- Directed by: Kinji Fukasaku
- Written by: Fumio Kōnami; Susumu Saji
- Starring: Tatsuo Umemiya
- Cinematography: Yoshikazu Yamazawa
- Music by: Isao Tomita
- Production company: Toei Tokyo
- Distributed by: Toei Company, Ltd.
- Release date: 1966 (Japan)
- Running time: 85 minutes
- Country: Japan
- Language: Japanese

Rampaging Dragon of the North (Japanese: 北海の暴れ竜, Hepburn: Hokkai no Abare-Ryu), also known as North Sea Dragon, is a 1966 Japanese yakuza action crime film directed by Kinji Fukasaku starring Tatsuo Umemiya and produced by Toei Tokyo.

In the film, members of the Ashida clan destroy the boats and equipment of a fishing village to punish the Yamagata family. A fisherman is killed. The victim's son returns after working with the yakuza and seeks revenge.

== Plot ==
Following a stint with the yakuza, a fisherman's son named Jiro returns home to his fishing village to find the boats and equipment destroyed by Gen Ashida, son of the boss of the Ashida clan, and his men as punishment for the Yamagata family working together with other fishing families. Jiro's mother does not want a yakuza staying in their village and his childhood friend Reiko explains that his father was killed. His brother Toshio confides that their father Jiro had forgiven Jiro for abandoning the village, whereupon Jiro decides to seek vengeance. Jiro fights his way into Ashida headquarters to confront the boss Ashida himself but Gen catches him whips him as punishment. Jiro's wounds are treated by his neighbors Some and Oritsu while Jiro keeps his true plans for revenge secret from his mother, claiming that he got into a drunken brawl.

Reiko's father Aida, now boss of the fishermen, is told by men from the Ashida clan that they are lowering their payments for fish, even though the village is not allowed to sell to anyone else. Jiro's youngest brother Shinkichi and another young fisherman named Toshi offer to help Jiro kill Ashida. One night the fishermen waste their money on a gambling operation run by Gen's bodyguard Kumai Go but Jiro joins and wins their money back for them. The next day Kumai attempts to win his money back from Jiro but Jiro continues to beat him and uses his winnings to buy information from Kumai about the strength of the Ashida clan, learning that their only weapon is the rifle owned by Gen. During a festival, Shinkichi and Toshi steal fireworks and use them to attack Ashida but Shinkichi is shot by Gen and washes up on the shore to die in Jiro's arms.

Ashida dumps the village's caught fish back into the water in order to inflate prices and refuses to let them go out fishing again, claiming that they would not catch enough to pay for the boats' fuel. Aida is beaten when he resists and Ashida wonders if they should kill Jiro to scare others away from joining forces with the Yamagata family. Gen suggests using Kumai to do it, since he doesn't mind if Kumai gets killed. Instead of sneaking up on Jiro, Kumai presents himself and challenges Jiro to a fair fight. Out of anger, Gen shoots Kumai's dog Koro to death, then shoots Kumai in the arm, preventing their duel from occurring. Jiro returns to the village and finds that Ashida's men have set it on fire but manages to rescue his mother from their burning home that she has run into in order to recover the memorials to her husband and son.

Finally at their breaking point, the various families of fishermen join forces with Jiro to battle the Ashida clan. Jiro instructs them to scatter the hoodlums and take the Ashida fishing boats out to sea to catch fish to sell in their own expanded shops. Kumai tells Jiro that one of Kumai's family members was also killed and that he is switching sides, revealing a large fishing clan tattoo on his back. Ashida's men pursue Jiro's crew of five men to the beach while the other fishermen take the boats out to sea. Jiro's men surprise Ashida's men with Molotov cocktails, then overpower them with swords and pikes. Sensing defeat, Ashida pleads with Gen not to pursue them but Gen rushes in with his rifle. Kumai stops Gen from shooting Jiro and then Gen fatally shoots Kumai before realizing that he has also been fatally stabbed by Kumai. Kumai tells Jiro that he has avenged his dog Koro, then dies. Jiro prepares to kill Ashida but is unable to do it when he sees the distraught father weeping with his dead son in his arms.

The families of fishermen work together using their new boats to catch a multitude of fish and expand their shops, this time selling the fish for their own profit. Jiro leaves them in order to turn himself in to the police for the murders and take sole responsibility for everything that has occurred.

== Cast ==
- Tatsuo Umemiya as Jiro
- Hideo Murota as Gen Ashida
- Susumu Fujita
- Nijiko Kiyokawa
- Yōko Mihara
- Shingo Tasashiro
- Hayato Tani as Shinkichi
- Eiko Azusa as Reiko
- Michitarō Mizushima
- Tōru Yuri
- Jirō Okazaki as Toshi
- Tōru Abe

== Production ==
The film was shot in color with mono sound.

== Reception ==
Hayley Scanlon of the website Windows on Worlds wrote that the film was produced during the mid-1960s when Fukasaku was still focused on traditional ninkyo eiga, "Fukasaku’s approach tallies with the classic narrative as the oppressive forces are ousted by a patient people pushed too far finally deciding to fight back and doing so with strategic intelligence." Scanlon notes that the film contains a "revolt against increasing post-war inequality" similar to Fukasaku's later films If You Were Young: Rage and Blackmail Is My Life "even whilst conforming almost entirely to Toei’s standard 'young upstart saves the village' narrative."
