= Cross the Rubicon! =

- Theatrical release poster
- Directed by: Kinji Fukasaku
- Written by: Kōji Takada
- Produced by: Goro Kusakabe; Naoyuki Sugimoto
- Starring: Kin'ya Kitaōji
- Cinematography: Shigeru Akatsuka
- Edited by: Isamu Ichida
- Music by: Toshiaki Tsushima
- Production company: Toei
- Distributed by: Toei
- Release date: June 21, 1975
- Running time: 92 minutes
- Country: Japan
- Language: Japanese

Cross the Rubicon! (Japanese: 資金源強奪, Hepburn: Shikingen godatsu), also known as Plundering the Source of Capital and Gambling Den Heist, is a 1975 Japanese yakuza film directed by Kinji Fukasaku.

== Plot ==
Takeshi Kiyamoto, a yakuza working for the Haneda-gumi gang, kills the boss of the rival Shonan-kai at the behest of his sworn brother Kuniyoshi. While imprisoned, Kiyamoto becomes friends with bank robbers Tetsuya Bessho and “Old Man” Kumakichi.

Three years later, Kiyamoto is released and met by his wife, Shizuko, and Kuniyoshi. The Haneda-gumi and Shonan-kai have since made peace and their respective bosses are to become sworn brothers. Kuniyoshi tells Kiyamoto not to attend the sakazuki ceremony and subsequent celebrations since the Shonan-kai still want revenge. Kiyamoto responds by saying that he is planning to retire with Shizuko to Kyushu anyway.

However, Kiyamoto’s confession is a ruse for a heist he is planning with the recently released Bessho and Kumakichi. The three raid the inn where both gangs are hosting an illegal card game. The trio steal 500,000,000 yen, much more than expected. Kiyamoto then divides the money, but Tetsuya and Kumakichi demand a bigger cut. Kiyamoto refuses, saying he wants them to lie low until the statute of limitations expires.

The Haneda-gumi leadership decides to hire corrupt policeman Bunmei Noshiro to retrieve the money. Bunmei tracks down Tetsu after discovering that he has been gambling his money away. Bunmei then follows Tetsu to his apartment before handing him over to the Haneda-gumi. At the Haneda-gumi’s office, Tetsu recognizes Kiyamoto and is tortured for more information. Kiyamoto tries to kill Tetsu whilst incognito, but a second masked figure rescues Tetsu. Kiyamoto is then found out by Haneda-gumi member Sugi. Kiyamoto offers to lead him to where he hid the money.

Tetsu’s rescuer is revealed to be Bunmei, who then lets him go. Meanwhile, Kiyamoto leads Sugi to a beach where the money is hidden. Kiyamoto then tries to escape with the money leading to a foot chase and fistfight with Sugi. Kiyamoto manages to escape after punching Sugi into the river and shooting him.

Tetsu then meets with Kumakichi, and the two decide to extort Kiyamoto. Kiyamoto agrees after he witnesses police and emergency services retrieving a beaten and bloodied Sugi. Kiyamoto agrees to meet with Tetsu and Kumachi at a cafe. Bunmei follows them there and informs Boss Haneda of the money's whereabouts after arranging a 20% cut for himseelf. Kiyamoto runs into Bunmei on the way to the cafe and decides to kidnap a girl to avert suspicion. Kiyamoto and Kumachi follow and find a suitcase in the trunk of Kiyamoto’s car. Bunmei confronts them and demands a cut for his silence. Tetsu and Kumakichi decide to flee, but Kumakichi is hit and killed by a truck while carrying the briefcase. It is revealed that the case contained newspaper clippings instead of the money.

Kiyamoto then bribes his hostage with a brooch to ensure her silence, but runs into Bunmei. Kiyamoto tries to match Boss Haneda’s offer, but Kumachi refuses. Kiyamoto returns home to find Kuniyoshi and one of his men holding Shizuko hostage, having been informed by Sugi about what happened before he died. After Kuniyoshi tortures Shizuko and threatening to torture him, Kiyamoto shows a pay locker key to distract Kuniyoshi. A scuffle ensues, attracting the attention of a knife-wielding Tetsu, who had secretly arrived. Tetsu fatally stabs Kuniyoshi while Kiyamoto then gets a hidden pistol and forces everyone else to leave. He then breaks up with Shizuko and reveals his intention to leave Japan.

Kiyamoto and Tetsu then plan to divide the money again. Kiyamoto retrieves the money from the pay locker, but Bunmei arrives and takes it back. However, the money he returns to the Haneda-gumi is less than expected. The gang accuses Bunmei of deliberately withholding the rest. Bunmei admits to it after Boss Haneda tells him that he was fired from the police force.

Bunmei returns to his apartment to find Kiyamoto waiting for him, whereupon the two decide to work together. Kiyamoto arrives at the Haneda-gumi’s office just as they hand over the Shonan-kai’s portion of the money (plus some extra to ensure their silence). Kiyamoto then proceeds to steal all of the money as Bunmei provides cover fire with a sniper rifle. The duo then take the money to Tetsu’s hideout, where Kiyamoto tries to double-cross Bunmei. Tetsu then uses Molotov cocktails to distract the two before trying to flee with Jeep containing the money. Bunmei shoots him, causing him to crash. Bunmei then tries to retrieve the money, but Kiyamoto runs him over with a car. Bunmei feigns a mortal wound and lets Kiyamoto go, having obtained enough money to buy a condo his wife wanted.

Kiyamoto then collects all of the remaining money. While at the airport, he finds that his ex-hostage is working there as his immigration officer. She shows him the brooch he had given her, quietly affirming that she will not give him up. Satisfied, Kiyamoto throws his gun into a garbage bin and leaves for Singapore.

== Cast ==
- Kin'ya Kitaōji as Takeshi Kiyomoto
- Tatsuo Umemiya as Bunmei Noshiro
- Kiwako Taichi as Shizuko
- Yayoi Watanabe as Yoko
- Hiroki Matsukata
- Takuzo Kawatani as Tetsuya Bessho
- Toru Abe as Hada
- Hideo Murota as Kumakichi
- Hiroshi Nawa as Kuniyoshi
- Kenji Imai as Sugitani
- Yoko Koizumi
- Bin Amatsu as Sagawa
- Shingo Yamashiro
- Shotaro Hayashi as Haruo
- Eizo Kitamura as Minagawa
- Masataka Iwao as Tsukasa
- Meika Seri as Michiru
- Yasuhiro Suzuki as Amano
- Tetsuo Fujisawa
- Seizo Fukumoto
- Kuniomi Kitani
- Mineko Maruhira as Yukiko
- Kinji Nakamura
- Kyoko Nami
- Ryo Nishida
- Seisaku Oda
- Harumi Sone
