= Shanghai Rhapsody =

1984 Japanese musical drama film

- Theatrical release poster
- Directed by: Kinji Fukasaku
- Screenplay by: Kinji Fukasaku; Yōzō Tanaka
- Story by: Ren Saitō (musical)
- Cinematography: Keiji Maruyama
- Music by: Nobuyoshi Koshibe
- Release date: October 6, 1984 (Japan)
- Running time: 121 minutes
- Country: Japan
- Language: Japanese

Shanghai Rhapsody (Japanese: 上海バンスキング, Hepburn: Shanhai bansukingu) is a 1984 Japanese musical drama film directed by Kinji Fukasaku, adapted from the 1979 musical of the same name.

== Plot ==
Promising to take his wife Madoka Masaoka on a cruise to France in 1939, Shirō Hatano tricks her into stopping over in Shanghai, where he has plans to get involved in the local jazz scene as a clarinet player together with his friend Wataru Matsumoto, a trumpet player. Matsumoto has become involved with Lily, the former girlfriend of the club owner Larry, who forces Matsumoto, Shirō, Madoka, and Lily to work performing jazz shows at his St. Louis club in exchange for giving up Lily. When Japan invades China, life becomes more complicated and it is no longer possible for Shirō to get work as a jazz performer. Matsumoto is drafted into the military and Shirō turns to alcohol, even selling his clarinet for a bottle of alcohol. Shirō is then persuaded by Hirota, a member of the Japanese Special Service Organization, to begin using opium. Shirō becomes addicted and completely dependent upon the aid of Madoka.

== Cast ==
- Keiko Matsuzaka as Madoka Masaoka a.k.a. "Madonna"
- Morio Kazama as Shirō Hatano
- Mitsuru Hirata as Shinzō Hirota
- Isao Natsuyagi as Shirai
- Etsuko Shihomi as Lin Zhuli a.k.a. "Lily"
- Ryudo Uzaki as Wataru Matsumoto a.k.a. "Bakumatsu"
- Noboru Mitani as Mr. Fang
- Ken Frankel as Larry
- Rachel Huggett as Susan
- Ohkusano as Wang
- Makino Sayoko as Yang Li
- Paula Seslin as Sasha Svetlana
- Sakae Umezu as Dr. Tagami
- Ryō Nishida as Yabūchi
- Dennis Falt as American musician
- Unknown actor as Shingly Taguchi
- Unknown actor as Raymond Kovacs
- Unknown actor as Yuzawa
- Unknown actor as Ishikawa
- Unknown actor as Guo
- Unknown actor as Hiramatsu
- Unknown actor as Yabuta
- Unknown actor as Yokoi

== Other credits ==
- Art Direction:
  - Kyohei Morita
  - Yutaka Yokoyama
- Assistant Director: Hideo Nanbu
- Sound recordist: Kazuhisa Takahashi

== Production ==
Keiko Matsuzaka said, "The filming took half a year, and we finally wrapped on September 6, 1984". It was reported that the Shanghai location shoot was scheduled for July 1984.

== Accolades ==
The film received multiple nominations at the 8th Japan Academy Film Prize, including Director of the Year and Outstanding Performance by an Actress in a Leading Role (Keiko Matsuzaka). It was also nominated for Best Music Score (Nobuyoshi Koshibe), Best Sound (Kazuhisa Takahashi), Best Supporting Actor (Ryūdō Uzaki), and Best Supporting Actress (Etsuko Shihomi).

Kazuhisa Takahashi won the Best Sound Recording award at the 1985 Mainichi Film Concours.

Etsuko Shihomi won the 1985 Yokohama Film Festival Prize for Best Supporting Actress.
