= Black Rose Mansion =

1969 Japanese drama film

- Theatrical release poster
- Directed by: Kinji Fukasaku
- Produced by: Akira Oda
- Cinematography: Takashi Kawamata
- Music by: Hajime Kaburagi
- Release date: January 25, 1969 (Japan)
- Running time: 90 minutes
- Country: Japan
- Language: Japanese

Black Rose Mansion (Japanese: 黒薔薇の館, Hepburn: Kuro Bara no Yakata), also known as Black Rose, is a 1969 Japanese drama film directed by Kinji Fukasaku.

== Plot ==
The millionaire Kyohei Sako converts his mother's old villa into an entertainment parlor for his hobbies called the Black Rose Mansion. Ryuko Fujio, a newly hired singer, claims that the black rose she coincidentally carries will turn red when she falls in love.

Mr. Otomo, a scholar in archeology, claims that Ryuko is his wife, but she claims not to know him. A young man named Tsukawa claims that he knew Ryuko from her days in Yokohama but she claims not to know him either. Tsukawa leaves despondent and is later found dead from suicide. A sailor claims that Ryuko is his girlfriend from Kobe then cuts off her right sleeve to expose an area where she has had a tattoo of a rose removed. Ryuko announces that she does not belong to anyone. When the sailor attempts to drag her away, her biracial assistant George intervenes and the two men stab each other to death in an attempt to win Ryuko's love. George's blood spills over Ryuko's black rose but Mr. Otoko insists that it will turn black again after a short time. He then leaves, having lost interest in Ryuko.

Police detectives investigate and Ryuko decides to leave the Black Rose Mansion, but Kyohei confesses that he is in love with her and offers to let her stay forever in his mansion. She agrees and he renovates the mansion to allow her to perform there alone without an audience.

Kyohei's wayward son Wataru visits to investigate and becomes infatuated with Ryuko. They fall in love but they do not have enough money to run away together so Wataru agrees to be the getaway driver for his friend Yajima when he robs a Norwegian vessel. They are shot by the police as they are escaping and Wataru collapses after reaching the Black Rose Mansion. His blood does not spill on Ryuko's black rose, disappointing her. Kyohei says that he is giving up Ryuko and asks Wataru to stay with him, but Wataru chooses Ryuko.

Wataru and Ryuko escape in a speedboat. Wataru bleeds out and collapses as Ryuko cries out that she loves him just before they crash into a larger vessel. Kyohei is called to the scene to identify the bodies, where he finds the black rose covered in red blood.

== Cast ==
- Akihiro Miwa as Ryuko Fujio
- Eitaro Ozawa as Kyohei Sako
- Masakazu Tamura as Wataru
- Ayako Hosho as Kyohei's Wife
- Kō Nishimura as Otomo
- Kikko Matsuoka as Reiko
- Akira Jo as George
- Ryōhei Uchida as Kazama
- Yūsuke Kawazu as Tsugawa

== Other credits ==
- Art direction: Kumagai Masao
- Written by:
  - Kinji Fukasaku
  - Hirō Matsuda
  - Yukio Mishima - play

== Reception ==
Hayley Scanlon of windowsonworlds.com wrote that Black Rose Mansion is "drenched in gothic melodrama" but "also succeeds in being both fascinatingly intriguing and a whole lot of strange fun at the same time."

In the book Rising Sun, Divided Land: Japanese and South Korean Filmmakers, author Kate E. Taylor-Jones writes, "In his use of people and characters that deliberately challenge the dominant ideology of attempting to 'forget' the war, Fukasaku is a fore-runner of later directors such as Miike Takashi who would also use non-Japanese characters to make comments on the state of Japanese society."
