= Kinji Fukasaku =

Japanese filmmaker (1930–2003)

Kinji Fukasaku 深作 欣二
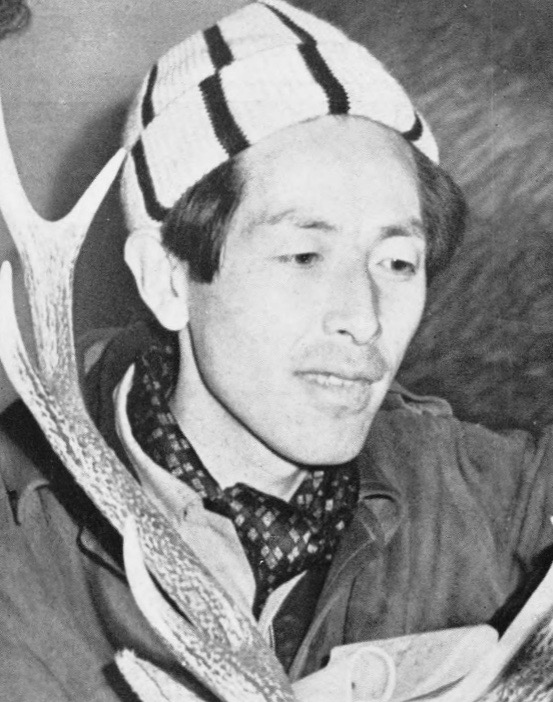
- Fukasaku in 1962
- Born: 3 July 1930; Mito, Ibaraki, Japan
- Died: 12 January 2003 (aged 72); Tokyo, Japan
- Occupation: Filmmaker
- Years active: 1961–2003
- Spouse: Sanae Nakahara
- Children: Kenta Fukasaku

Kinji Fukasaku (Japanese: 深作 欣二, Hepburn: Fukasaku Kinji; 3 July 1930 – 12 January 2003) was a Japanese filmmaker. Known for his "broad range and innovative filmmaking", he worked in many different genres and styles, but was best known for his gritty yakuza films, typified by the Battles Without Honor and Humanity series (1973–1976). According to the Berkeley Art Museum and Pacific Film Archive, his "turbulent energy and at times extreme violence express a cynical critique of social conditions and genuine sympathy for those left out of Japan's postwar prosperity". He used a cinema verite-inspired shaky camera technique in many of his films from the early 1970s.

Fukasaku wrote and directed over 60 films between 1961 and 2003. Some Western sources have associated him with the Japanese New Wave movement of the 1960s and 1970s, but this belies his commercial success. His works include the Japanese portion of the Hollywood war film Tora! Tora! Tora! (1970), jidaigeki such as Shogun's Samurai (1978), the space opera film Message from Space (1978), the science fiction film Virus (1980), the fantasy film Samurai Reincarnation (1981), and the highly influential dystopian thriller film Battle Royale (2000).

Fukasaku won the Japan Academy Film Prize for Director of the Year three times from nine nominations. He served as the sixth president of the Directors Guild of Japan from 1996 until his death from prostate cancer in 2003. He received the Purple Medal of Honor from the Japanese government for his work in 1997. His films have inspired directors such as Quentin Tarantino, William Friedkin, and John Woo.

== Early life ==
Kinji Fukasaku was born on 3 July 1930 in Mito, Ibaraki, the youngest of five children. When he was 15 years old, his entire class was drafted, and he worked as a munitions worker during World War II. In July 1945, the class was caught in a bombing. Since the children could not escape the bombs, they had to dive under each other in order to survive; the surviving members of the class had to dispose of the corpses. After the war, he spent much of his time watching foreign films.

== Career ==
Fukasaku studied cinema at Nihon University, in the country's first film department, before switching to the literature department for screenwriting during his junior year. There he studied under Kogo Noda and Katsuhito Inomata. After graduating in 1953, Fukasaku became an assistant director at Toei in June 1954, where he worked under people such as Masahiro Makino and Yasushi Sasaki.

Fukasaku made his directorial debut in 1961 with the two featurettes Drifting Detective: Tragedy in the Red Valley and Drifting Detective: Black Wind in the Harbor, starring Sonny Chiba. His first feature-length film for the New Toei subsidiary was High Noon for Gangsters that same year. His first film produced in color was Gang vs. G-Men (1962). His first film for the Toei Company proper was The Proud Challenge the following year starring Kōji Tsuruta. He had his breakthrough hit in 1964 with Ken Takakura starring in Jakoman and Tetsu. From 1966 to 1971, he created several modern gang films for Toei usually starring Tsuruta, such as Ceremony of Disbanding (1967), Gambler's Farewell (1968), and Japan Organized Crime Boss (1969).

Thanks to a non-exclusive contract, he also directed Black Lizard, based on Yukio Mishima's stage adaptation of the Edogawa Rampo novel, and Black Rose Mansion for Shochiku both of which starred the transvestite actor Akihiro Miwa. In 1968 he directed The Green Slime, a United States-Japan science fiction co-production.

In 1970, Fukasaku was recruited to direct the Japanese portion of another US-Japan film, Tora! Tora! Tora!, after Akira Kurosawa pulled out. Using his pay from the project, he bought the rights to adapt Under the Flag of the Rising Sun. The movie was critically acclaimed, even being selected as Japan's entry for Best Foreign Language Film at the 45th Academy Awards in 1972, although it was not accepted as a nominee. That year also saw the release of Street Mobster starring Bunta Sugawara, which resulted in Toei producer Koji Shundo selecting Fukasaku to direct a groundbreaking yakuza film. Battles Without Honor and Humanity was released in 1973. Up to this point, Japan's many yakuza films had usually been tales of chivalry set in the pre-war period, but Fukasaku's ultra-violent, documentary-style film took place in chaotic post-War Hiroshima. A commercial and critical success, it gave rise to seven sequels by Fukasaku and three movies that are based on the series but directed by others. After directing several more yakuza films, Graveyard of Honor (1975), Cops vs. Thugs (1975), Yakuza Graveyard (1976), and Hokuriku Proxy War (1977), Fukasaku left the genre.

He focused on historical epics; Shogun's Samurai (1978), The Fall of Ako Castle (1978), Samurai Reincarnation (1981); and science fiction; Message from Space (1978) and Virus (1980). Virus was Japan's most expensive production at the time, and became a financial flop. However, two years later he directed the acclaimed comedy Fall Guy, which won both the Japan Academy Prize for Picture of the Year and Kinema Junpo Award for Best Film of the Year. Fukasaku was chosen to direct Violent Cop (1989), but a scheduling conflict caused him to pull out and Takeshi Kitano took over in his first directorial role.

In 2000, Battle Royale was released. The film received positive critical praise and became a major financial success, grossing ¥3.11 billion domestically. It became a cultural phenomenon, creating an entire genre of its own in which a select group of people are instructed to kill each other until there is a triumphant survivor. Near the end of his life, Fukasaku branched out into the world of video games and directed the survival horror game Clock Tower 3 (2002).

== Personal life ==
Fukasaku met actress Sanae Nakahara when she starred in his film Wolves, Pigs and Men (1964). According to her, he gave her some acting instructions on the film's set, but otherwise hardly spoke to her; upon completing the film, he took what she described as a "furious approach" to wooing her with phone calls and letters. They married after three months of dating and had a son named Kenta (born 1972), who also became a filmmaker. Whenever Fukasaku directed other actresses, the media ran sensationalist stories of their marriage supposedly being in "crisis", which they both ignored.

== Death ==
In September 2002, Fukasaku revealed that he had prostate cancer. In late December, shortly after filming began on Battle Royale II: Requiem, he was hospitalized. On 12 January 2003, at the age of 72, he died at a hospital in Tokyo. He had directed only a single scene of Battle Royale II at the time of his death; his son Kenta, who had co-written the screenplay, took over as director.

== Filmography ==
=== Films ===
| Year | Title | Japanese | Romanization |
|---|---|---|---|
| 1961 | Drifting Detective: Tragedy in the Red Valley a.k.a. Duel in the Valley | 風来坊探偵 赤い谷の惨劇 | Fūraibō Tantei: Akai Tani no Sangeki |
| 1961 | Drifting Detective: Black Wind in the Harbor | 風来坊探偵 岬を渡る黒い風 | Fūraibō Tantei: Misaki wo Wataru Kuroi Kaze |
| 1961 | Hepcat in the Funky Hat a.k.a. Man with the Funky Hat | ファンキーハットの快男児 | Fankī Hatto no Kaidanji |
| 1961 | Hepcat in the Funky Hat: The 20,000,000 Yen Arm | ファンキーハットの快男児 2千万円の腕 | Fankī Hatto no Kaidanji: Nisenman-en no Ude |
| 1961 | High Noon for Gangsters a.k.a. Greed in Broad Daylight | 白昼の無頼漢 | Hakuchū no Buraikan |
| 1962 | The Proud Challenge | 誇り高き挑戦 | Hokori Takaki Chōsen |
| 1962 | Gang vs. G-Men | ギャング対Gメン | Gyangu Tai Jī-men |
| 1963 | League of Gangsters a.k.a. Gang Alliance | ギャング同盟 | Gyangu Dōmei |
| 1964 | Jakoman and Tetsu a.k.a. One-Eyed Captain and Tetsu | ジャコ萬と鉄 | Jakoman to Tetsu |
| 1964 | Wolves, Pigs and Men a.k.a. Wolves, Pigs and People | 狼と豚と人間 | Ōkami to Buta to Ningen |
| 1966 | The Threat | 脅迫 | Odoshi |
| 1966 | Kamikaze Man: Duel at Noon a.k.a. The Kamikaze Guy | カミカゼ野郎 真昼の決斗 | Kamikaze Yarō: Mahiru no Kettō |
| 1966 | Rampaging Dragon of the North a.k.a. North Sea Dragon | 北海の暴れ竜 | Hokkai no Abare Ryū |
| 1967 | Ceremony of Disbanding | 解散式 | Kaisanshiki |
| 1968 | Gambler's Farewell | 博徒解散式 | Bakuto Kaisanshiki |
| 1968 | Black Lizard | 黒蜥蝪 | Kurotokage |
| 1968 | Blackmail Is My Life | 恐喝こそわが人生 | Kyōkatsu Koso Waga Jinsei |
| 1968 | The Green Slime | ガンマ3号 宇宙大作戦 | Gammā Daisan Gō: Uchū Dai Sakusen |
| 1969 | Black Rose Mansion | 黒薔薇の舘 | Kurobara no Yakata |
| 1969 | Japan Organized Crime Boss | 日本暴力団 組長 | Nihon Bōryoku-dan: Kumichō |
| 1970 | Bloodstained Clan Honor a.k.a. Bloody Gambles | 血染の代紋 | Chizome no Daimon |
| 1970 | If You Were Young: Rage | 君が若者なら | Kimi ga Wakamono Nara |
| 1970 | Tora! Tora! Tora! | トラ・トラ・トラ！ | Tora Tora Tora! |
| 1971 | Sympathy for the Underdog | 博徒外人部隊 | Bakuto Gaijin Butai |
| 1972 | Under the Flag of the Rising Sun | 軍旗はためく下に | Gunki Hatameku Moto ni |
| 1972 | Street Mobster | 現代やくざ 人斬り与太 | Gendai Yakuza: Hitokiri Yota |
| 1972 | Outlaw Killers: Three Mad Dog Brothers | 人斬り与太・狂犬三兄弟 | Hitokiri Yota: Kyōken San Kyōdai |
| 1973 | Battles Without Honor and Humanity a.k.a. The Yakuza Papers (Volume 1) | 仁義なき戦い | Jinginaki Tatakai |
| 1973 | Battles Without Honor and Humanity: Deadly Fight in Hiroshima a.k.a. The Yakuza Papers: Deadly Fight in Hiroshima (Volume 2) | 仁義なき戦い 広島死闘篇 | Jinginaki Tatakai: Hiroshima Shitō-hen |
| 1973 | Battles Without Honor and Humanity: Proxy War a.k.a. The Yakuza Papers: Proxy War (Volume 3) | 仁義なき戦い 代理戦争 | Jinginaki Tatakai: Dairi Sensō |
| 1974 | Battles Without Honor and Humanity: Police Tactics a.k.a. The Yakuza Papers: Police Tactics (Volume 4) | 仁義なき戦い 頂上作戦 | Jinginaki Tatakai: Chōjō Sakusen |
| 1974 | Battles Without Honor and Humanity: Final Episode a.k.a. The Yakuza Papers: Final Episode (Volume 5) | 仁義なき戦い 完結篇 | Jinginaki Tatakai: Kanketsu-hen |
| 1974 | New Battles Without Honor and Humanity | 新仁義なき戦い | Shin Jinginaki Tatakai |
| 1975 | Graveyard of Honor | 仁義の墓場 | Jingi no Hakaba |
| 1975 | Cops vs. Thugs a.k.a. Police vs. Violence Groups | 県警対組織暴力 | Kenkei tai Soshiki Bōryoku |
| 1975 | Cross the Rubicon! a.k.a. Gambling Den Heist | 資金源強奪 | Shikingen Gōdatsu |
| 1975 | New Battles Without Honor and Humanity: The Boss's Head | 新仁義なき戦い 組長の首 | Shin Jinginaki Tatakai: Kumichō no Kubi |
| 1976 | Violent Panic: The Big Crash | 暴走パニック 大激突 | Bōsō Panikku: Dai Gekitotsu |
| 1976 | New Battles Without Honor and Humanity: Last Days of the Boss | 新仁義なき戦い 組長最後の日 | Shin Jinginaki Tatakai: Kumichō Saigo no Hi |
| 1976 | Yakuza Graveyard a.k.a. Yakuza Burial: Jasmine Flower | やくざの墓場 くちなしの花 | Yakuza no Hakaba: Kuchinashi no Hana |
| 1977 | Hokuriku Proxy War | 北陸代理戦争 | Hokuriku Dairi Sensō |
| 1977 | Doberman Cop | ドーベルマン刑事 | Dōberman Deka |
| 1978 | Shogun's Samurai a.k.a. Yagyu Clan Conspiracy | 柳生一族の陰謀 | Yagyū Ichizoku no Inbō |
| 1978 | Message from Space | 宇宙からのメッセージ | Uchū Kara no Messēji |
| 1978 | The Fall of Ako Castle | 赤穂城断絶 | Akōjō Danzetsu |
| 1980 | Virus | 復活の日 | Fukkatsu no Hi |
| 1981 | The Gate of Youth | 青春の門 | Seishun no Mon |
| 1981 | Samurai Reincarnation | 魔界転生 | Makai Tenshō |
| 1982 | Dotonbori River a.k.a. Lovers Lost | 道頓堀川 | Dōtonborigawa |
| 1982 | Fall Guy | 蒲田行進曲 | Kamata Kōshin Kyoku |
| 1983 | Theater of Life ("Lust" segment) | 人生劇場 | Jinsei Gekijō |
| 1983 | Legend of the Eight Samurai | 里見八犬伝 | Satomi Hakkenden |
| 1984 | Shanghai Rhapsody | 上海バンスキング | Shanghai Bansu Kingu |
| 1986 | House on Fire | 火宅の人 | Kataku no Hito |
| 1987 | Sure Death 4: Revenge | 必殺4 恨みはらします | Hissatsu Fō: Urami Harashimasu |
| 1988 | A Chaos of Flowers | 華の乱 | Hana no Ran |
| 1990 | Double Panic '90: Los Angeles Police Special Investigation Unit! | ダブル・パニック'90 ロス警察大捜査線! | Daburu Panikku '90 Rosu Keisatsu Daisōsasen! |
| 1992 | The Triple Cross a.k.a. The Day's Too Bright | いつかギラギラする日 | Itsuka Giragira Suru Hi |
| 1994 | Crest of Betrayal a.k.a. Loyal 47 Ronin: Yotsuya Ghost Story | 忠臣蔵外伝 四谷怪談 | Chūshingura Gaiden: Yotsuya Kaidan |
| 1995 | The Abe Clan | 阿部一族 | Abe Ichizoku |
| 1997 | The Eaters | 20世紀末黙示録 もの食う人びと | Nijusseikimatsu Mokushiroku: Mono kuu Hitobito |
| 1998 | The Geisha House | おもちゃ | Omocha |
| 2000 | Battle Royale | バトル・ロワイアル | Batoru Rowaiaru |
| 2003 | Battle Royale II: Requiem (directed one scene) | バトル・ロワイヤル II: 【鎮魂歌】 | Batoru Rowaiaru Tsū: "Rekuiemu" |

=== Episodes of television series ===
- Key Hunter (1968) - Episodes 1 and 2
- Hissatsu Shikakenin (1972) - Episodes 1, 2, and 24
- G-Men '75 (1975-1979) - Episodes 16, 20, 85, and 354
- The Yagyu Conspiracy (1978) - Episode 1
- Shadow Warriors (1981) - Season 2, Episode 1
- Magical Mystery Theater: "The Woman in the Black Mansion" (February 25, 1982)

=== Video game ===
- Clock Tower 3 (2002)

== Awards ==
- 1974 Kinema Junpo Reader's Choice Award for Best Film - Battles Without Honor and Humanity
- 1976 Blue Ribbon Award for Best Director - Graveyard of Honor, Cops vs. Thugs
- 1982 Hochi Film Award for Best Film - Fall Guy
- 1983 Japan Academy Prize for Director of the Year - Fall Guy, Dotonbori River
- 1983 Japan Academy Prize for Picture of the Year - Fall Guy
- 1983 Blue Ribbon Award for Best Film - Fall Guy
- 1983 Blue Ribbon Award for Best Director - Fall Guy
- 1983 Mainichi Film Award for Best film - Fall Guy
- 1983 Mainichi Film Award for Best Director - Fall Guy
- 1983 Mainichi Film Award Reader's Choice Award - Fall Guy
- 1983 Kinema Junpo Reader's Choice Award for Best Film - Fall Guy
- 1983 Kinema Junpo Reader's Choice Award for Best Director - Fall Guy
- 1983 Kinema Junpo Reader's Choice Award for Best Film - Fall Guy
- 1985 Japan Academy Prize for Director of the Year - Legend of the Eight Samurai, Shanghai Rhapsody
- 1987 Japan Academy Prize for Director of the Year - House on Fire
- 1987 Japan Academy Prize for Picture of the Year - House on Fire
- 1987 Kinema Junpo Reader's Choice Award for Best Film - House on Fire
- 1993 Yokohama Film Festival Special Prize - career
- 1994 Nikkan Sports Film Award for Best Director - Crest of Betrayal
- 1995 Japan Academy Prize for Director of the Year - Crest of Betrayal
- 1995 Japan Academy Prize for Picture of the Year - Crest of Betrayal
- 1997 ATP Award Television Grand Prix - Grand Prix award - The Eaters
- 1999 Nikkan Sports Film Award for Best Director - The Geisha House
- 2001 Japan Academy Prize Popularity Award - Battle Royale
- 2001 Japan Academy Prize for Director of the Year (Nomination) - Battle Royale
- 2001 Japan Academy Prize for Picture of the Year (Nomination) - Battle Royale
- 2001 Blue Ribbon Award for Best Film - Battle Royale
- 2001 Sitges Film Festival for Best Film (Nomination) - Battle Royale
- 2001 San Sebastián Horror & Fantasy Film Festival Audience Award for Best Feature Film - Battle Royale
- 2003 Japan Academy Prize Special Award - career
- 2003 Blue Ribbon Award Special Award - career
- 2004 Mainichi Film Award Special Award - career
