= Nobuo Yana =

Japanese film actor (born 1935)

- Born: 19 August 1935 (age 90); Okayama City, Okayama Prefecture, Japan
- Occupation: Actor
- Years active: 1956–present

Nobuo Yana (Japanese: 八名信夫, Hepburn: Yana Nobuo; born 19 August 1935) is a Japanese film actor. He is most famous for playing villains. Before he started his acting career, he was a professional baseball player of Toei Flyer's.

In 1956, he joined Toei Flyer's but in 1958, he retired because of an injury. He joined Toei film company and made his film debut in 1959. He debuted as a director with his film Dagashiya Koharu in 2018.

== Selected filmography ==
=== Film ===
- The Proud Challenge (1962)
- Gang vs. G-Men (1962)
- Wolves, Pigs and Men (1964) : Bagman
- A Fugitive from the Past (1965) : Machida
- Soshiki Bōryoku series (1967–69) : Tetsu
- Abashiri Prison film series (1965-1972)
- Gendai Yakuza: Yotamono Jingi (1969) : Itō
- Bloodstained Clan Honor (1970) : Yabuki
- Street Mobster (1972) : Karasawa
- Female Convict Scorpion: Beast Stable (1973) : Adachi
- Battles Without Honor and Humanity: Deadly Fight in Hiroshima (1973) : Asano
- Battles Without Honor and Humanity: Proxy War (1974) : Kawanishi
- Battles Without Honor and Humanity: Final Episode (1974) : Ryosuke Kaga
- New Battles Without Honor and Humanity (1974) : Susumu Kudo
- New Battles Without Honor and Humanity: The Boss's Head (1975) : Miyai
- New Battles Without Honor and Humanity: The Boss's Last Days (1975) : Tsurukichi Nemoto
- Yakuza Graveyard (1976) : Ezaki
- Doraemon: Nobita's Little Star Wars (1985) : General Gilmore (Voice)
- The Triple Cross (1992)
- Ghost Pub (1994) : Uohara
- Ambition Without Honor (1996)
- Minna no Ie (2001) : Arakawa Jr.
- Dagashiya Koharu (2018)

=== Television ===
- Kikaider 01 (1973–74) as Big Shadow
- Himitsu Sentai Gorenger (1976–77) as Black cross Führer
- Uchi no Ko ni Kagitte... (1984) as Nobuyuki Fukami
- Dokuganryū Masamune (1987) as Munefuyu Murata
