= Kōji Tsuruta =

Japanese actor and singer (1924–1987)

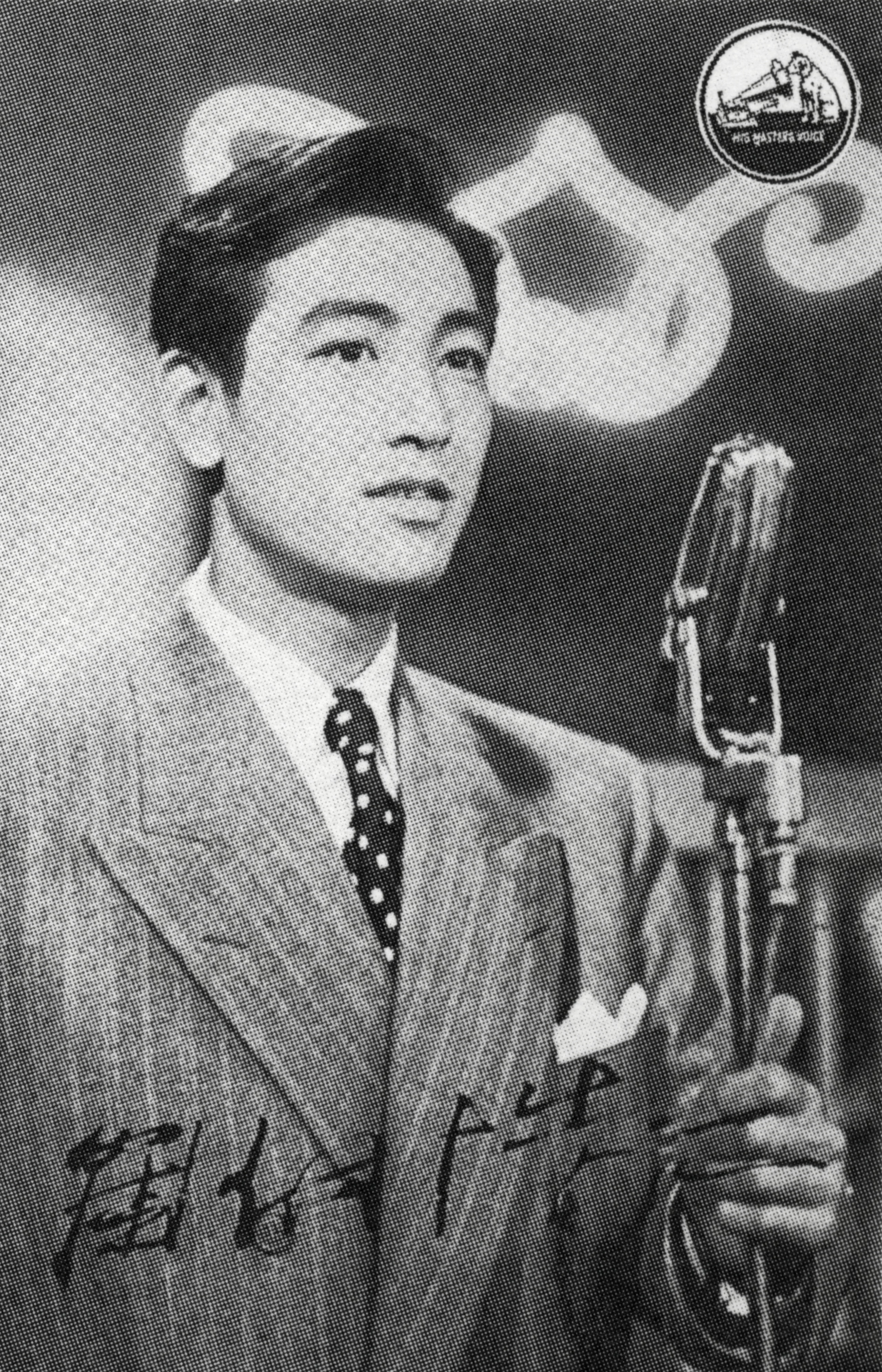
- Tsuruta in 1950
- Born: Eiichi Ono; December 6, 1924; Hamamatsu, Shizuoka, Japan
- Died: June 16, 1987 (aged 62)
- Occupations: Actor, singer
- Years active: 1948–1987

Eiichi Ono (Japanese: 小野 榮一, Hepburn: Ono Eiichi; December 6, 1924 – June 16, 1987), better known by his stage name Kōji Tsuruta (鶴田 浩二, Tsuruta Kōji), was a Japanese actor and singer. He appeared in almost 260 feature films and had a unique style of singing.

== Career ==
Born in Hamamatsu, Shizuoka, Tsuruta was raised in Osaka by his grandmother, following his parents' divorce. A delinquent in high school, he finished second from the bottom of his class.

Tsuruta was studying at Kansai University when he was drafted into the Imperial Japanese Navy Air Service in 1944. After the war he joined Koukichi Takada's theater troupe and made his film debut at Shochiku in 1948 with Yūkyō no Mure, gaining a female following for playing handsome leads. He left Shochiku in 1952 to start his own production company. Prior, a romance with actress Keiko Kishi made headlines and Shochiku forced the two to end the relationship. He was attacked by the yakuza in 1953. He notably played Sasaki Kojirō in Toho's Samurai Trilogy (1954–1956), opposite Toshirō Mifune.

He joined Toei in 1960, and found success with 1963's Jinsei Gekijo: Hishakaku. In his book The Yakuza Movie Book : A Guide to Japanese Gangster Films, Mark Schilling cites this film for starting the ninkyo eiga trend of chivalrous yakuza films. For the next decade Tsuruta, alongside Ken Takakura, was Toei's leading star in yakuza films, starring or guest-starring in a different film every month at his peak. Tsuruta was also a successful singer, scoring hits with such songs as "Kizudarake no Jinsei".

However, in the 1970s he struggled and his performances were criticized when the yakuza genre shifted to a modern, more realistic setting. He made his last film in 1985, The Last True Yakuza. Tsuruta died from lung cancer on June 16, 1987, at the age of 62.

== Selected filmography ==
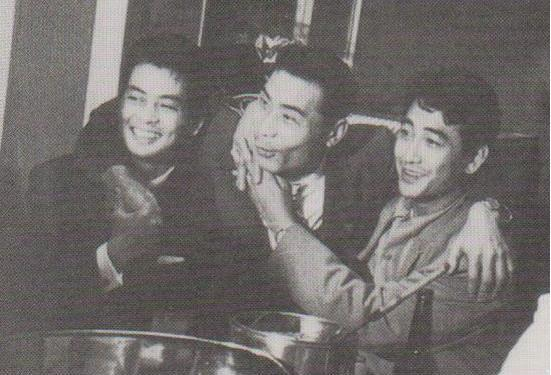
From left to right, Mitsuru Ono, Kazuo Taoka and Kōji Tsuruta in 1952

=== Films ===
- Eden no Umi (1950)
- Battle of Roses (1950)
- Tea Over Rice (1952)
- A Night in Hawaii (Hawai no Yoru) (1953)
- Samurai Trilogy (1954–1956)
  - Samurai II: Duel at Ichijoji Temple (1955)
  - Samurai III: Duel at Ganryu Island (1956)
- A Man Among Men (1955)
- Nemuri Kyōshirō Burai Hikae (1956)
- Yagyu Secret Scrolls (1957)
- Oshidori Kenkagasa (1957)
- Yagyu Secret Scrolls Part II (1958)
- The Loyal 47 Ronin (1958)
- Boss of the Underworld (Ankokugai no Kaoyaku) (1959)
- The Birth of Japan (1959)
- Secret of the Telegian (1960)
- Gang vs. G-Men (1962)
- Chūshingura: Hana no Maki, Yuki no Maki (1962)
- Jinsei Gekijo: Hishakaku (1963)
- Bakuto (1964)
- Meiji Kyokyakuden – Sandaime Shumei (1965)
- Nihon Kyokakuden Ketto Kanda Matsuri (1966)
- Ceremony of Disbanding (1967)
- Bakuchi-uchi: Socho Tobaku (1968)
- Japan Organized Crime Boss (1969)
- Bloodstained Clan Honor (1970)
- Sympathy for the Underdog (1971)
- Kizudarake no Jinsei (1971)
- Golgo 13: Assignment Kowloon (1977)
- Yakuza Senso: Nihon no Don (1977)
- Imperial Navy (1981)
- The Gate of Youth (1981)
- Conquest (1982)
- Saigo no Bakuto (1985)

=== Television ===
- Ōgon no Hibi (1978) – as Sen no Rikyū
- Sanga Moyu (1984) – as Shigenori Tōgō
