= Tetsurō Tamba =

Japanese actor (1922–2006)

- 丹波 哲郎
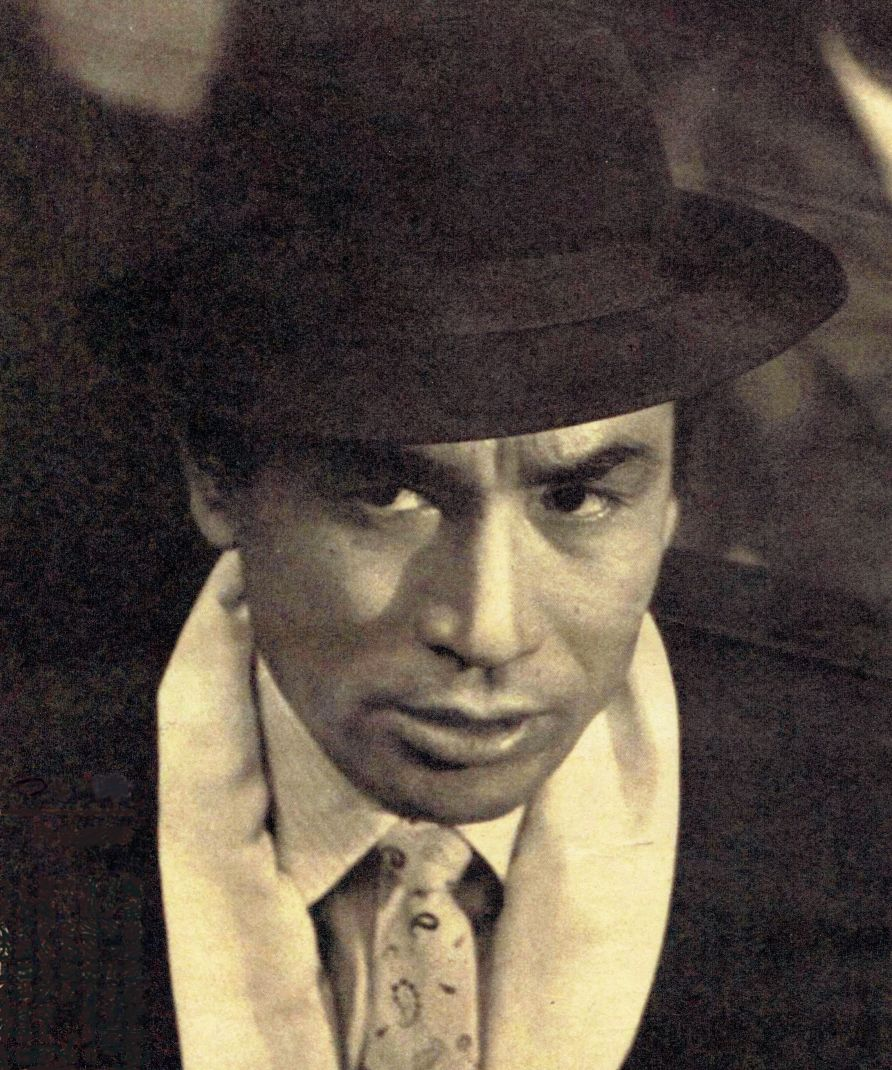
- Born: Shozaburo Tanba; 17 July 1922; Tokyo, Japan
- Died: 24 September 2006 (aged 84); Tokyo, Japan
- Education: Chuo University
- Occupations: Actor, author
- Years active: 1950–2006
- Children: 2, including Yoshitaka

Japanese name
- Kanji: 丹波 哲郎
- Hiragana: たんば てつろう
Transcriptions
- Romanization: Tamba Tetsurō

Alternative Japanese name
- Kanji: 丹波 正三郎
Transcriptions
- Romanization: Tanba Shozaburo

Tetsurō Tamba (Japanese: 丹波 哲郎, Hepburn: Tanba Tetsurō), born Shozaburo Tanba (丹波 正三郎, Tanba Shōzaburō; July 17, 1922 – September 24, 2006), was a Japanese actor with a career spanning five decades. He appeared in nearly 300 film and television productions, both in leading and supporting roles, and was the winner of the 1981 Japan Academy Film Prize for Best Supporting Actor.

At the height of his career, he was one of Japan's most esteemed and prolific leading men, and worked with many significant directors including Kinji Fukasaku, Shōhei Imamura, Masaki Kobayashi, Masahiro Shinoda and Takashi Miike. Several of his films were identified with the Japanese New Wave movement. He also appeared in several international films, notably as Japanese secret service chief Tiger Tanaka in the 1967 James Bond film You Only Live Twice.

Later in his life, Tamba became known for his well-publicized interest in psychic phenomena, publishing several books on the subject and acting as a spokesperson for the Risshō Kōsei Kai new religious movement. He continued acting until 2006, when he died of pneumonia.

== Biography ==
Tamba had a part-time job as an interpreter at Supreme Commander for the Allied Powers before becoming an actor. In 1948, he graduated from Chuo University. In 1951, he joined the Shintoho company and made his screen debut with Satsujinyogisha.

Tamba was introduced to Western audiences in the 1961 film Bridge to the Sun directed by Etienne Périer. He also appeared in the 1964 film The 7th Dawn, directed by Lewis Gilbert. Tamba is perhaps best known by Western audiences for his role as Tiger Tanaka in the 1967 James Bond film You Only Live Twice, also directed by Gilbert (Tamba's voice was dubbed by Robert Rietti). By then, he had among other roles appeared in two films by director Masaki Kobayashi: Harakiri and Kwaidan. He also portrayed the lead character in the police dramas Key Hunter and G-Men '75, the latter of which remains his best-known role in Japan. In 1981, he won the Best Actor in a Supporting Role award of Japan Academy Prize for his work in The Battle of Port Arthur.

Tamba appeared in a lot of jidaigeki television dramas. His major historical roles were Imai Sōkyū in the 1978 taiga drama Ōgon no Hibi and Sanada Masayuki in the 1985 Sanada Taiheiki.

He voiced the "Cat King" in the original Japanese version of the Studio Ghibli anime film The Cat Returns. He had parts in Twilight Samurai and two Takashi Miike films, The Happiness of the Katakuris and Gozu, as well as acting as a spokesperson for the Dai Rei Kai spiritual movement.

Tamba's son, Yoshitaka Tamba, is also an actor.

In February 2005, Tamba was hospitalized for influenza and appendicitis. He lost weight drastically and his health degenerated. On September 24, 2006, he died in Tokyo at the age of 84 of pneumonia. His last appearance in the television series is the 2005 Taiga drama Yoshitsune and his last film appearance is Sinking of Japan in 2006.

== Selected filmography ==
=== Films ===
- Satsujin Yôgisha (1952)
- Kaidan Kasane-ga-fuchi (The Ghost of Kasane) (1957) as Jinjûrô Ômura
- Hitogui Ama (1958) as Miyata
- The Story of Osaka Castle (1961) as Sadamasa Ishikawa
- Pigs and Battleships (1961) as Slasher Tetsuji
- High Noon for Gangsters (1961) as Miyahara
- Bridge to the Sun (1961) as Jiro
- Kuroi gashû dainibu: Kanryû (1961)
- Harakiri (1962) as Hikokuro Omodaka
- Gang vs. G-Men (1962) as Jūgo Tatsumura
- Tange Sazen (1963)
- 13 Assassins (1963)
- Jakoman and Tetsu (1964) as Jakoman
- Three Outlaw Samurai (1964) as Sakon Shiba
- Dojo yaburi (1964) as Gunjuro Ohba
- Ansatsu (1964) as Hachirô Kiyokawa
- Gokinzo yaburi (1964)
- The 7th Dawn (1964) as Ng
- Kwaidan (1964) as Warrior (segment "Miminashi Hôichi no hanashi")
- Zoku Dojo Yaburi: Mondo Muyo (1964)
- Kuchikukan yukikaze (1964)
- Abashiri Prison (1965)
- Samurai Spy (1965) as Sakon Takatani
- Ninpō-chushingura (1965)
- The Kii River (1966)
- Portrait of Chieko (1967)
- Soshiki Bōryoku (1967)
- Zoku Soshiki Bōryoku (1967)
- You Only Live Twice (1967) as Tiger Tanaka
- Gambler's Farewell (1968) as Toru Kuroki
- Blackmail Is My Life (1968)
- Goyokin (1969) as Rokugo Tatewaki
- Chōkōsō no Akebono (1969)
- Hibotan bakuto: Tekkaba retsuden (1969)
- The Five Man Army (1969) as Samurai
- The Scandalous Adventures of Buraikan (1970) as Soshun Kochiyama
- Battle of Okinawa (Gekidō no Shōwashi: Okinawa Kessen) (1971) as Lieutenant General Isamu Cho
- The Wolves (1971) as Genryu Asakura
- Silence (1971) as Cristóvão Ferreira
- Under the Flag of the Rising Sun (1972) as Sergeant Katsuo Togashi
- The Water Margin (1972) as Jade Unicorn Lu Chun I
- Kage Gari (1972) as Tanuma Ogitsugu
- Kage Gari Hoero taiho (1972) as Kegemetsuke
- The Human Revolution (1973)
- Battles Without Honor and Humanity: Proxy War (1973) as Tatsuo Akashi
- Za Gokiburi (1973)
- Submersion of Japan (1973) as Prime Minister Yamamoto
- Bohachi Bushido: Code of the Forgotten Eight (1973) as Shinō Ashita (the Assassin)
- Violent Streets (1974) as Shimamura
- Zero Woman: Red Handcuffs (1974) as Zengo Nagumo
- Prophecies of Nostradamus (1974) as Dr. Nishiyama
- Karafuto 1945 Summer Hyosetsu no mon (1974)
- Castle of Sand (1974) as Detective Imanishi
- The Bullet Train (1975)
- All Men Are Brothers (1975) as Jade Unicorn Lu Chun Yi
- Zoku ningen kakumei (1976)
- The Classroom of Terror (1976) : Father of Kitajo
- Seven Nights in Japan (1976) as Terrorist Leader (uncredited)
- Ozora no samurai (1976) as Captain Saito
- Mount Hakkoda (1977) as Colonel Kojima
- Shogun's Samurai: The Yagyu Clan Conspiracy (1978) as Ogasawara Gensinsai (Tajima's Rival)
- Message from Space (1978) as Noguchi
- The Incident (1978) as Kikuchi
- Bandits vs. Samurai Squadron (1978) as Kichibei Matsuya
- Koutei no inai hachigatsu (1978) as Mikami
- Yasei no shômei (1978) as General Wada
- The Fall of Ako Castle (1978) as Yanagisawa
- Sanada Yukimura no Bōryaku (1979)
- Nichiren (1979)
- Hunter in the Dark (1979)
- The Bushido Blade (1979) as Lord Yamato
- The Battle of Port Arthur (1980, the film is also known as 203 kochi) as General Kodama Gentarō
- Shogun's Ninja (1980)
- Makai Tensho: Samurai Reincarnation (1981) as Muramasa
- Imperial Navy (1981) as Vice Admiral TakijirÅ Ånishi
- Onimasa (1982) as Uichi Suda, The Big Boss
- Dai nippon teikoku (1982) as Hideki Tojo
- Suspicion (1982) as Okamura
- Conquest (1982)
- Fireflies in the North (1984)
- Tokyo Blackout (1987) as Nakata
- Shinran: Path to Purity (1987) as Aketora
- Twilight of the Cockroaches (1987) as Grandpa (voice)
- A Taxing Woman's Return (1988) as Sadohara
- Tokyo Pop (1988) as Mr. Dota
- Shogun's Shadow (1989) as Hotta Masamori
- 226 (1989) as Jinzaburi Shinzaki
- Teito Taisen (1989) as Kanaami Kohou
- Riki-Oh: The Story of Ricky (1991) as Master Zhang Shangui
- Edo Jō Tairan (1991) as Tokugawa Mitsukuni
- The Hitman (1991) as Deku-san
- Peking Genjin: Who Are You? (1997) as Osone
- Neji Shiki (1998) as Landlord
- Inou Chuukei ~Shigosen no Yume~ (2001)
- The Happiness of the Katakuris (2001) as Grandpa Jinpei Katakuri
- Graveyard of Honor (2002) as Tetsuji Tokura
- The Cat Returns (2002) as Cat King (voice)
- Duri baka nisshi 13 hama chan kikiippatsu! (2002) as Goro Kurobe
- 11'09"01 September 11 (2002) (segment "Japan") (uncredited)
- Jitsuroku Andô Noboru kyôdô-den: Rekka (2002) as Sanada
- The Twilight Samurai (2002) as Tozaemon Iguchi
- T.R.Y. (2003)
- Gozu (2003)
- Sennenbi (2004)
- Demon Pond (2005) as Yatabei
- Japan Sinks (2006) as Reiko's grandpa (final film role)

=== TV dramas ===
- Tange Sazen (1958–1959, NTV) as Tange Sazen
- Key Hunter (1968, TBS) : Kuroki
- Daichūshingura (1971) : Chisaka Takafusa
- The Water Margin (1973)
- G-Men '75 (1975–1982, TBS) as Chief Kuroki (1975) / Chief Kuroki
- Onihei Hankachō (1975) as Hasegawa Heizō
- Ōgon no Hibi (1978 NHK) as Imai Sōkyū
- Shishi no Jidai (1980, NHK)
- Tōge no Gunzō (1982, NHK)
- Marco Polo (1983, NBC) as Saiamon
- Chōshichirō Edo Nikki (1983, NTV) as Yagyū Munefuyu
- Ōoku (1984) as Tokugawa Ienari
- Super Police (1985, TBS)
- Miyamoto Musashi (1984–1985, NHK) as Shinmen Munisai
- Sanada Taiheiki (1985–1986 NHK) as Sanada Masayuki
- Chūshingura (1985)
- Kayō Suspense Gekijō: Bengoshi Takabayashi Ayuko series (1986–2005, NTV)
- Mito Kōmon (1986, TBS)
- Inochi (1986, NHK) as Masamichi
- Kasuga no Tsubone (1989, NHK) as Tokugawa Ieyasu
- Kumokiri Nizaemon (1995, Fuji TV)
- Toshiie and Matsu (2002, NHK) as Iguchi Tarōzaemon
- Yoshitsune (2005, NHK) as Minamoto no Yorimasa

=== Animation ===
- Crayon Shin-chan: Explosion! The Hot Spring's Feel Good Final Battle (1999)
- The Cat Returns (2002)

== Awards and nominations ==
=== Awards ===
- 1974: Mainichi Film Award: Best Actor for The Human Revolution
- 1981: Blue Ribbon Awards: Best Supporting Actor for The Battle of Port Arthur
- 1981: Japan Academy Prize: Best Supporting Actor for The Battle of Port Arthur
- 2000: Nikkan Sports Film Award: Best Supporting Actor for 15-Sai: Gakko IV

=== Awards nominated ===
- 2001: Japan Academy Prize: Best Supporting Actor for 15-Sai: Gakko IV
