= Wolves, Pigs and Men =

1964 Japanese crime film

- Theatrical release poster
- Directed by: Kinji Fukasaku
- Written by: Kinji Fukasaku; Jun'ya Satō
- Produced by: Tatsu Yoshida; Seiichi Yoshino
- Starring: Rentarō Mikuni; Ken Takakura; Kin'ya Kitaōji
- Cinematography: Ichirō Hoshijima
- Edited by: Osamu Tanaka
- Music by: Isao Tomita
- Production company: Toei
- Release date: August 26, 1964
- Running time: 95 minutes
- Country: Japan
- Language: Japanese

Wolves, Pigs and Men (Japanese: 狼と豚と人間, Hepburn: Ōkami to Buta to Ningen) is a 1964 Japanese black-and-white crime film directed by Kinji Fukasaku.

== Plot ==
Three brothers are born in a slum. Kuroki, the eldest brother, leaves to join a yakuza organization. Jirō, the middle brother, leaves five years later, leaving the youngest brother Sabu to care for their mother alone. Kuroki's organization sets up Jirō to be arrested and he spends five years in jail. When he is released, he finds Sabu and others carrying his mother's coffin away and Sabu tells him that their mother would not have wanted to see him anyway because he stole her money when he left.

At the opening of Club Phoenix, Kuroki's boss tells him that Jirō has been released and that he must keep him close in order to keep an eye on him. Sabu attempts to bring their mother's cremated remains to Kuroki but Kuroki gives him money for a grave and kicks him out. Sabu throws the remains in the river and uses the money to celebrate his freedom with his friends. At the Mizuhara Trading office, Jirō and Mizuhara plot to rob 20 million yen from the Iwasaki Group as it is being transported. Kuroki arrives and gives Jirō money to leave town but Jirō buys forged passports and cheaply recruits Sabu and Sabu's friends to help with the robbery.

At the airport, Sabu's friends stage a brawl as a distraction while Jirō and Mizuhara stick up the three bagmen at gunpoint and put sunglasses covered in black tape over their eyes to blind them as Sabu and Mako grab the bags of money and flee. Jirō attempts to rob the money from Sabu at Sabu's hideout but only finds Mako, who says that Sabu has left with the bags. Mizuhara also arrives and fruitlessly attempts to rob the money from Jirō. Sabu's friends arrive and one of them, Akira, is killed in a struggle with Mizuhara. Jirō's lover Kyōko enters and tells them that the locals are gathering outside. Jirō convinces the locals that he is Kuroki from the Iwasaki Group investigating people who have betrayed the Group and tells them not to interfere. Sabu arrives and tells his friends that they have been betrayed because the bags contained 20 million yen in cash and 20 million yen in drugs, despite the meager cut promised to them.

After being overpowered, Sabu refuses to give up the location of the bags despite being beaten so Jirō and Mizuhara torture his friends one by one to make him talk. Iwasaki sends Kuroki to investigate and Kuroki goes to the slum but leaves after only finding black tape in Sabu's house. Sabu's friend Hiroshi lies to Jirō that the bags were left at the club. Jirō takes Sabu's gun to the club, where he is attacked by Iwasaki members who had been following Kuroki. They learn from the club owner that Jirō was looking for Sabu's bags, which leads them to link the robbery to Kuroki when they find the black tape on him. Sabu and his friends escape and run in different directions but Hiroshi is caught by the Iwasaki Group and the others return to Jirō and Mizuhara.

Kuroki, arriving to be questioned, sees a beaten Hiroshi being put into the trunk of a car. He is told that he is responsible for his brothers and must get the drugs and money back. Jirō and Mizuhara continue torturing Sabu but Sabu refuses to talk and breaks his own hands with bricks to prove his determination. Kuroki arrives and attempts to take Sabu away but they all know that Sabu will be tortured by the Iwasaki Group so Sabu refuses to leave. Kuroki threatens to torture Mizuhara to make them talk but Mizuhara begs for ten minutes to talk things over with the other participants in the robbery. Mizuhara threatens to shoot one of Sabu's friends but is shot by Jirō.

Kuroki holds the members of the Iwasaki Organization at bay outside and begs Sabu to surrender. Takeshi surrenders but is shot in the back by Sabu, who joins forces with Jirō and tells Kuroki that he must join them and fight against the Iwasaki Group if he wants to know where the bags are. As Kuroki stands to make his decision, the other members of the Iwasaki Group storm the hideout and kill everyone inside. As Kuroki walks away the slum-dwellers pelt him with objects, including a dead rat.

== Cast ==
- Rentarō Mikuni as Kuroki, the eldest brother
- Ken Takakura as Jirō, the middle brother
- Kin'ya Kitaōji as Sabu, the youngest brother
- Shinjirō Ehara as Mizuhara
- Renji Ishibashi as Hiroshi
- Sanae Nakahara
- Jirō Okazaki as Takeji
- Hiroko Shima as Mako
- Shunji Kasuga as Nishimura
- Shōken Sawa as Iwasaki
- Seiichi Shisui as Akira
- Seiji Echizenya as Isao
- Masa Suganuma as Noda
- Akira Katayama as Iwasaki's assistant
- Tadashi Naitō
- Shirō Ōki as Kurabu's Boy
- Pierre Segawa as Manager
- Sakae Shima as Iwasaki's assistant
- Gōzō Sōma
- Minoru Sawada as Iwasaki's henchman
- Nobuo Yana as Bagman
- Takashi Hio
- Kōji Miemachi as Iwasaki's henchman
- Masahito Mizuki as Iwasaki's assistant
- Kiyome Takemura as Waitress
- Hideko Konoe
- Akemi Fuji as Waitress
- Midori Yamamoto
- Yuriko Anjō

== Production ==
In an interview with Kinji Fukasaku in the book Outlaw Masters of Japanese Film, the director spoke about his attempt to make a film different from the usual Toei yakuza films, saying, "My desire is not only in defeating evil but how far desire can go. Even if desire doesn't get that far and fails, as long as you stick with an emotion then the main character could be understood."

== Release ==
The film had a wide release in Japan on August 26, 1964. It has also been released under the titles Wolves, Pigs and People, and Wolf, Pig, and Man.

Film Movement released Wolves, Pigs and Men in North America digitally on September 27, 2024. For the Blu-ray release, the company bundled it together with another Fukasaku film, Violent Panic: The Big Crash.

== Reception ==
In a review in Critics Roundup, reviewer Marc Walkow wrote that initially Fukusaku and Toei mimicked rival Nikkatsu's 'borderless action' films but that Fukusaku's sixth film, Wolves, Pigs and Men (64), 'broke the mold' by taking the 'best elements' from his earlier works and adding commentary on social issues 'endemic to Japan's transition from postwar defeated nation to economic powerhouse'."

In the book Historical Dictionary of Japanese Cinema, author Jasper Sharp notes that along with Gang vs. G-Men, Wolves, Pigs and Men established Fukasaku's pattern for contemporary action and crime dramas drawing inspirations from the French New Wave and American noir, featuring realistic portrayals of violence and often set in chaotic, working-class settings.
