= Street Mobster =

1972 Japanese Yakuza film by Kinji Fukasaku

- Theatrical release poster
- Directed by: Kinji Fukasaku
- Written by: Yoshihiro Ishimatsu; Kinji Fukasaku
- Starring: Bunta Sugawara; Noboru Ando
- Cinematography: Hanjiro Nakazawa
- Music by: Toshiaki Tsushima
- Distributed by: Toei
- Release date: May 6, 1972
- Running time: 92 minutes
- Country: Japan
- Language: Japanese

Street Mobster, known in Japan as Gendai Yakuza: Hitokiri Yota (現代やくざ 人斬り与太), is a 1972 Japanese yakuza film directed by Kinji Fukasaku and starring Bunta Sugawara and Noboru Ando. It is the sixth installment in Toei's Gendai Yakuza series of unrelated films by different directors, all starring Sugawara. Shot on location in Kawasaki, the plot centers around Okita, a street thug and troublemaker released from prison after ten years only to discover that the criminal underworld in which he used to operate and the socio-political landscape of Japan has changed dramatically. Complex named it number 3 on their list of "The 25 Best Yakuza Movies". Home Vision Entertainment released the movie on DVD in North America in 2004. Arrow Films released a special edition blu-ray in Europe and North America in June, 2018.

== Plot ==
The protagonist, Isamu Okita, mentions how he has the same birthday, August 15, and was born the same year, 1945, that Japan surrendered at the end of World War II, which he considers inauspicious. He was born the only son of an alcoholic prostitute-turned street food vender who neglected him until she drowned while walking home drunk. With no education or money, he got into trouble and was sent to reform school twice, before forming a gang as a teenager and getting involved in extortion and kidnapping girls to sell to brothels on the mean streets of Kawasaki. The Takigawa yakuza family demands a cut of their earnings, and when Okita refuses, he gets beaten. Abandoned by his friends, he attacks the gangsters who beat him with a knife, getting sentenced to ten years in prison. There, he meets Taniguchi, a quiet man serving time for domestic violence. After the two are released, Taniguchi turns down Okita's offer to join him after finding his abused wife waiting outside the prison for him.

Okita returns home and spends the last of his money at a sauna, where he gets in a fight with some old associates from his younger days. They recognize him and offer to hire a prostitute, who turns out to be Kimiyo, a girl Okita raped several years ago before selling her. She chases him to the old factory his gang used as a hideout, and after a violent argument, they realize they both have feelings for each other and have sex. Kizaki, a yakuza expelled from his family, approaches Okita with a proposition: by recruiting local street punks, they can put together a new gang and go to war with Boss Takigawa, whom he perceives as weak. The gang makes a series of raids on Takigawa-owned businesses before Okita gets shot and the Takigawa family finds the bar where he and his gang are hiding. Kizaki contacts Takigawa's rival, Boss Yato, and asks to let him and his gang swear loyalty to him. Okita refuses to do so, but eventually gives in.

Forced to reconcile with Takigawa, Okita becomes an officer of the Yato family with Kizaki as his second-in-command, getting his own territory to control and quickly becoming rich by running illegal dice games. He soon becomes bored with having to act as a businessman rather than a fighter, and cheats on Kimiyo with several women before she angrily leaves him. He also angers Boss Yato when he shows disrespect to Chairman Owada of the Saiei Group, an Osaka syndicate planning to form an alliance with Takigawa. Yato is compelled to perform yubitsume as an apology, and demands Okita do the same. Okita refuses, and he and his men are expelled. Advised to leave town, he instead decides to stay and conduct a guerrilla war against the Saiei Group.

The war leads to most of Okita's gang getting killed, and even Kizaki turns on him and tries to skip town, only to be pursued by Saiei men into oncoming traffic, whereupon he gets struck and killed by a car. Yato has Boss Takigawa and his officers killed in a surprise attack and gives his territory to Owada as a peace offering, promising to get Okita to apologize if they will spare his life. With only two men left, Okita prepares to fight to the death, but relents when his men refuse to back him up any longer. He cuts off his own finger and surrenders, but the Saiei Group goes back on their word and has his men taken away to be executed while Okita himself is about to be permanently scarred with a dagger. Kimiyo (having forgiven him earlier) tries to save him, only to be stabbed to death. Okita loses his mind and attacks Yato, stabbing him in the chest before the Saiei Group guns him down. The yakuza then depart, leaving the two bodies to rot.

== Cast ==
- Bunta Sugawara as Isamu Okita
- Noboru Ando as Shunsuke Yato
- Asao Koike as Kizaki
- Hideo Murota as Miyahara
- Kyosuke Machida as Takeo Gunji
- Mayumi Nagisa as Kimiyo
- Noburo Mitani as Taniguchi
- Asao Uchida as Eisaku Owada
- Takeo Chii as Yasuo
- Mayumi Fujisato as Katsuko
- Sayoko Tanimoto as Okita's mother
- Nenji Kobayashi as Tetsuo
- Toshiyuki Tsuchiyama as Kazama
- Keijiro Morozumi as Takigawa
- Mariko Jun as Yukari
- Chie Kobayashi as Kaoru
- Koji Fujiyama as Ronanushi
- Nobuo Yana as Karasawa
- Hiroshi Date as Kawabe

== Production ==
When he was chosen to direct the sixth installment in the Gendai Yakuza ("Modern Yakuza") series, Fukasaku decided to depict a low-ranking street thug who gets caught up in the world of the yakuza. Scriptwriter Yoshihiro Ishimatsu brought in a first draft, but the director thought it was too similar to his 1971 film Sympathy for the Underdog and took to rewriting it personally. Residing in a cheap hotel in Shinjuku, Fukasaku could not work as he was too engrossed in watching the Asama-Sansō incident on television. He later told film critic Sadao Yamane that he tried to incorporate the "thrilling essence" of the incident into Street Mobster.

The film's lead, Bunta Sugawara, who had yakuza friends, said he gave Fukasaku many suggestions while filming, such as how someone who had never shot a gun would do so.

== See also ==
- Gendai Yakuza: Yotamono Jingi, the second Gendai Yakuza film, which also featured Sugawara as the lead.
