= Japan Organized Crime Boss =

1969 Japanese yakuza film by Kinji Fukasaku

- Theatrical release poster
- Directed by: Kinji Fukasaku
- Written by: Norio Osada; Fumio Konami; Kinji Fukasaku
- Produced by: Koji Shundo; Koji Ohta; Tatsu Yoshida
- Starring: Kōji Tsuruta; Bunta Sugawara; Noboru Ando; Tomisaburō Wakayama
- Narrated by: Tomoo Nagai
- Cinematography: Hanjiro Nakazawa
- Edited by: Osamu Tanaka
- Music by: Masanobu Higure
- Production company: Toei
- Release date: July 8, 1969
- Running time: 97 minutes
- Country: Japan
- Language: Japanese

Japan Organized Crime Boss (Japanese: 日本暴力団 組長, Hepburn: Nihon Bōryoku-dan: Kumichō; lit. 'Japan's Violent Gangs - Boss') is a 1969 Japanese yakuza film directed by Kinji Fukasaku. Based on real events, the film was a success and spawned three sequels.

== Plot ==
The Danno Organization, Japan's largest yakuza family, expands outward from its base in Osaka during the post-war period under the leadership of Boss Danno and Chief Executive Tsubaki, the family's ruthless captain. In Yokohama, the boss of the Hamanaka Family pledges fealty to the Danno Organization. In order to block Boss Danno's progress, the yakuza families of Tokyo form the Tokyo Alliance, appointing Boss Yato as chairman. The Alliance uses the Sakurada Family, the dominant family in Yokohama, to attack the Hamanaka Family in a proxy war between their forces and those of the Danno Organization.

Hamanaka's right-hand man, Tetsuo Tsukamoto, is released after spending eight years in prison and learns that his wife committed suicide. Shortly thereafter, the boss of the Hamanaka family is killed by explosives thrown by hitmen from the Sakurada Family. With his dying breath, he passes control of the gang to Tsukamoto, urging him to reject the Danno Organization and fight to keep them out of Yokohama. A funeral is organized, with both Chairman Yato and Boss Danno visiting to pay their respects. Kamiyama, the retired boss of the Hamanaka, offers to help Tsukamoto as an unofficial advisor.

Tsukamoto wishes to call a truce with the Sakurada Family and end his family's oath to Boss Danno, but decides to kill Boss Sakurada in order to appease his men's desire for vengeance. A senior Hamanaka officer, Kazama, is unwilling to let Tsukamoto return to jail after just getting out, so he murders Boss Sakurada himself, returning home mortally wounded and dying from his injuries. Tsubaki tries to convince Tsukamoto to remain with the Danno Organization and Danno himself warns Tsukamoto that he could wind up "dead in the gutter" for opposing him. Meanwhile, Kazama's sister is left with no one to care for her, so Tsukamoto tells her she can ask anything of him.

The Hokuryu Kai, a gang led by the drug-addicted Miyahara, is expelled from the Tokyo Alliance for showing disrespect and violating the yakuza code. Tsubaki convinces them to swear loyalty to Boss Danno and sends them against the Sakurada Family, resulting in many Sakurada members getting killed and a Hamanaka man, Taki, being taken hostage by the Hokuryu when he tries to intervene in a fight at a local nightclub. Tsukamoto is ordered to come alone if he wants to save him. Tsukamoto arrives at the club and discovers Kazama's sister working as a singer. In a back room, he finds a badly beaten Taki being held by Miyahara and his men. Miyahara punches Tsukamoto and slashes him with a knife, but Tsukamoto refuses to fight back. Miyahara, not wanting to antagonize the entire Hamanaka Family, allows him to leave with Taki. Kazama's sister quits her job and nurses Tsukamoto back to health. They begin a relationship after realizing that they both have feelings for each other.

Chairman Yato uses Ooba, a former boss with a grudge against the Danno Organization for wiping out his family and leaving him with only one arm in a confrontation the previous year, to carry out an attack on Boss Danno. Ooba finds Danno coming out of a meeting with political kingpin Bokudo Kita and shoots him in the shoulder before taking a bullet to the chest. An American tourist behind him is also struck by gunfire. Ooba flees and is rescued by the Hamanaka Family, but Tsubaki soon finds him after seeing his wife enter the family offices. Ooba and his wife try to leave in secret, but are intercepted by Danno Organization men. Ooba is shot dead, and his wife is gunned down when she goes after his killers.

When the American tourist dies from her wound, Bokudo tells Boss Danno that, to protect his family, he must reconcile with the Tokyo Alliance and support the Japan-U.S. Security Treaty. The Tokyo Alliance agrees to the truce, but only if Danno forces the Hokuryu Kai out of Yokohama. Miyahara refuses to leave, so Danno severs all ties with him. Miyahara tells his men to leave the city until he can swear loyalty to Tsukamoto. Members of the Tokyo Alliance ambush Miyahara and kill him. Tsukamoto is arrested by the police before he can help Miyahara, allowing the Danno Organization to launch a surprise attack that leaves the Hamanaka Family decimated. The police berate Tsukamoto for his actions, blaming him for countless deaths, but ultimately release him from custody. Kazama's sister begs Tsukamoto not to retaliate and accuses him of putting the gang before her, just like her brother. Tsukamoto refuses to listen and decides to take revenge himself.

Tsubaki, disgusted by his boss's decision to reconcile with the Tokyo Alliance, notices Tsukamoto approaching the site of the ceremony and deliberately lets Tsukamoto stab him so he does not have to take the blame for not protecting Danno. Armed with sharp blades, Tsukamoto kills Boss Danno and Chairman Yato, while letting Bokudo live. A yakuza shoots him, and he bleeds to death, having upheld his family's honor.

== Cast ==
- Kōji Tsuruta as Tetsuo Tsukamoto
- Tomisaburō Wakayama as Miyahara
- Bunta Sugawara as Kazama
- Noboru Ando as Ooba
- Michitaro Mizushima
- Ryohei Uchida as Tsubaki
- Takamaru Sasaki as Bokudo Kita
- Sanae Nakahara as Katsuko, Ooba's wife
- Seizaburō Kawazu as Yato
- Asao Uchida as the Danno family boss
- Rinichi Yamamoto as Haraguchi
- Yoshi Katō as Kamiyama
- Harumi Sone as Taki, a Hamanaka family member
- Hideo Murota as Shiga, a Hamanaka family member
- Mina Isshiki as Kazama's sister

== Production ==
Japan Organized Crime Boss was director Kinji Fukasaku's first film about "modern yakuza" after his return to Toei Company, as well as his first with actors Tomisaburō Wakayama and Noboru Ando. According to yakuza film historian Akihiko Ito, Toei producer Koji Shundo conceived the idea to set the film against the social background of Japan's then-current high economic growth period in order to depart from the ninkyo eiga subgenre. It was Shundo who cast Wakayama and Ando and chose Fukasaku to direct because of his style. Fukasaku transposed the geopolitical situation of the ongoing Cold War, where the US and Soviet Union fought by using smaller countries in proxy wars, into the structure of a yakuza film. In order to achieve this, he based it on real events using Atsushi Mizoguchi's non-fiction book Blood and Conflict (1969), itself based on magazine reports about the Yamaguchi-gumi. Fuksaku also read Hans Magnus Enzensberger's Politics and Crime, which describes how the state dismantles organizations that it feels are no longer necessary.

== Release ==
The film was released in Japan on July 8, 1969, as a double feature with Song of the Night: Harbor Town Blues. According to Ito, it was a big success thanks in part to the public's then-fascination with the Yamaguchi-gumi, so Toei asked for a sequel. It was followed by Junya Sato's Nihon Boryoku-dan: Kumicho to Shikaku (Japan's Violent Gangs - The Boss and the Killers) in 1969, Shin Takakuwa's Nihon Boryoku-dan: Kumicho Kuzure (Japan's Violent Gangs - Degenerate Boss) in 1970, and Yasuo Furuhata's Nihon Boryoku-dan: Koroshi no Sakazuki (Japan's Violent Gangs - Loyalty Offering) in 1972.

Japan Organized Crime Boss was released on Blu-ray in the United Kingdom and United States by Radiance Films on 18 November 2024.

== Planned sequel ==
Fukusaku biographer Sadao Yamane stated that the Fukasaku film Sympathy for the Underdog, released a short time later in 1971 and that also stars Tsuruta and Ando, was originally developed as a sequel to Japan Organized Crime Boss until the director saw The Battle of Algiers. According to Yamane, it was then that Fukasaku decided to make a film about "foreigners" and "resistance groups" within a yakuza film. Ito also stated that Sympathy for the Underdog started as a sequel to Japan Organized Crime Boss, and called the two "sister films".
