= Bunta Sugawara =

Japanese actor (1933–2014)

- Born: August 16, 1933; Sendai, Empire of Japan
- Died: November 28, 2014 (aged 81); Tokyo, Japan
- Occupation: Actor
- Years active: 1956–2012
- Children: 3

Bunta Sugawara (Japanese: 菅原 文太, Hepburn: Sugawara Bunta; August 16, 1933 – November 28, 2014) was a Japanese actor who appeared in almost 200 feature films. Dropping out of Waseda University, he worked as a model before entering the film industry in 1956. After years of work, Sugawara finally established himself as a famous actor at the age of 39, with the lead role of Shozo Hirono in the Battles Without Honor and Humanity series (1973–1976) of yakuza films. He quickly found additional success starring as the truck driver Momojiro Hoshi in the comedic Torakku Yarō series (1975–1979). In 1980, Sugawara won the Japan Academy Prize for Best Supporting Actor for his role as a detective in the satirical Taiyō o Nusunda Otoko (1979).

== Life and career ==
Sugawara was born in Sendai, Miyagi Prefecture. His father was a newspaper reporter. His parents divorced when he was four, and he moved to Tokyo to live with his father and stepmother. As part of a wartime policy to evacuate children from major cities, he was moved back to Sendai during fourth grade. As an adult he entered Waseda University's law program, but was dropped in his second year for failing to pay and began work as a model. He had minor roles in the Shiki Theatre Company.

His first film role was in the 1956 Toho film Aishu no Machi ni Kiri ga Furu. Sugawara appeared in Teruo Ishii's 1958 White Line after being scouted by the Shintoho studio. At Shintoho he gained starring roles despite being a newcomer. However, when Shintoho filed for bankruptcy in 1961, Sugawara moved to the Shochiku studio where he was cast in Masahiro Shinoda's Shamisen and Motorcycle, but was fired from the role for coming to set late after a night drinking. He gave a notable performance in Keisuke Kinoshita's Legend of a Duel to the Death (1963), but it did not fare well at the box office. Disenchanted with the low pay, and what he felt were unsuitable roles, he left and went to Toei in 1967 after being recommended by Noboru Ando.

He had a part in Ishii's 1967 Abashiri Bangaichi: Fubuki no Toso, one of many films in the director's Abashiri Prison series. Sugawara's first starring role at Toei was in Gendai Yakuza: Yotamono no Okite in 1969. It launched a series, with the last installment, 1972's Street Mobster by Kinji Fukasaku, being the most successful. He achieved major success in 1973 at the age of 40, when he starred in Fukasaku's five-part yakuza epic Battles Without Honor and Humanity. Based on a real-life yakuza conflict in Hiroshima, the series was very successful, and popularized a new type of yakuza film called the Jitsuroku eiga, and the role of Shozo Hirono still remains his most well known. Sugawara also starred in Fukasaku's Cops vs. Thugs in 1975. Also in 1975, he starred in the comedy Torakku Yarō: Go-Iken Muyō as love-seeking truck driver Momojiro Hoshi, which launched a successful ten-installment series. Sugawara won the 1980 Japan Academy Prize for Best Supporting Actor for his role as a detective in Kazuhiko Hasegawa's 1979 satirical film Taiyō o Nusunda Otoko.

His son Kaoru died in a railroad crossing accident in October 2001 at the age of 31. In 2007, Sugawara was diagnosed and treated with radiation for bladder cancer.

On February 23, 2012, Sugawara announced his retirement from acting. He came to the decision after the Great East Japan earthquake and being hospitalized in the winter of 2011, although he said he might consider future roles. Late in life, he took up farming in Yamanashi Prefecture.

On November 13, 2014, Sugawara was checked into a Tokyo hospital after having a routine checkup. He died in the hospital from liver failure caused by liver cancer on November 28 at 3:00 am, aged 81. A funeral for family was held on November 30 at Dazaifu Tenmangū, and his death was publicly announced by Toei on December 1.

== Filmography ==
=== Films ===
- Aishu no Machi ni Kiri ga Furu (1956)
- Shirosen Himitsu Chitai (1958) - Goto, Sudo's Henchman
- Joōbachi no Ikari (1958) - Jōji
- Mofubuki no Shito (1959) - Kinya
- Ama no Bakemono Yashiki (1959) - Detective Nonomiya
- Kurutta Yokubō (1959)
- Kyūjūkyū-honme no Kimusume (1959) - Abe Masayuki
- Onna Dorei-sen (1960) - Sugawa
- Bakudan wo Daku Onna Kaitō (1960) - Asakura - Railroad Security Officer
- Taiheiyō Sensō: Nazo no Senkan Mutsu (1960) - Naval officer
- Kuroi Chibusa (1960) - Hiroshi Taniguchi
- Mejū (1960) - Sugiyama
- Otoko no Sekai da (1960)
- Bōryoku Gonin Musume (1960) - Kazuhiko Nanjō
- Fūryū Kokkei-tan: Sennin Buraku (1961)
- Shamisen to Ootobai (1961)
- A Legend or Was It? (1963) - Gōichi Takamori
- Miagete Goran Yoru no Hoshi o (1963) - Miwa
- Iroboke Yokuboke Monogatari (1963)
- Kō ni Kieta Aitsu (1963)
- Kawachi no Kaze Yōri-abare Daikō (1963)
- The Scent of Incense (1964) - Sugiura
- Kodoku (1964)
- Nippon Paradise (1964)
- Yoru no Henrin (1964) - Tamura
- Kuchikukan Yukikaze (1964)
- Chi to Okite (1965)
- Blood and Rules (1965)
- Highway no Ohsama (1965)
- Zokū Seiun Yakuza - Ikarî no Otoko (1965)
- Seiun Yakuza (1965)
- Kao o Kase (1966)
- Honō to Okite (1966) - Ōtsu
- By a Man's Face Shall You Know Him (1966)
- Sora Ippai no Namida (1966) - Sakaki
- Kinokawa (1966) - School principal
- Ahendaichi Jigokubutai Totsugekseyo (1966)
- Shinka 101: Koroshi no Yojinbo (1966)
- Otoko no Kon (1966)
- Dōsu-dokyō no Hanamichi (1966)
- Abashiri Bangaichi: Fubuki no Toso (1967) - Mamushi
- Utage (1967) - Lieutenant Kuruihara
- Zenka Mono (1968)
- Gorotsuki (1968)
- Red Peony Gambler: Gambler's Obligation (1968) - Shiraishi
- Bakuto Retsuden (1968) - Masakichi
- Kyōdai Jingi Gyakuen no Sakazuki (1968)
- Kaibyō Nori no Numa (1968) - Ukon Shibayama
- Heitai Gokudo (1968)
- Gokudo (1968) - Sasaki Toshiya
- Wicked Priest (1968) - Ryotatsu
- Wicked Priest 2: Ballad of Murder (1968) - Ryotatsu
- Furyō Banchō: Inoshika Ochō (1969)
- Tabi ni Deta Gokudo (1969)
- Gendai Yakuza: Yotamono Jingi (1969) - Goro
- Yakuza Law (1969)
- Japan Organized Crime Boss (1969)
- Kantō Tekiya Ikka (1969)
- Soshiki Bōryoku Kyodaisakazuki (1969)
- Nihon Boryoku-dan: Kumicho (1969) - Kazama
- Gorotsuki Butai (1969)
- Gendai Yakuza: Yotamono no Okite (1969)
- Furyo Bancho Okuri Ookami (1969)
- Chōeki san Kyōdai (1969)
- Wicked Priest 3: A Killer’s Pilgrimage (1969) - Ryotatsu
- Bloodstained Clan Honor (1970)
- Kantō Tekiya Ikka: Goromen Jingi (1970)
- Red Peony Gambler: Oryu's Return (1970) - Tsunejioro
- Furyō Banchō: Ikkaku Senkin (1970)
- Kantō Tekiya Ikka: Tennōji no Kettō (1970)
- Nippon Dabi Katsukyu (1970)
- Saigo no Tokkōtai (1970)
- Wicked Priest 4: The Killer Priest Comes Back (1970) - Ryutatsu
- Hitokiri Kannon-uta (1970) - Blind Priest Ryotatsu
- Gendai Yakuza: Shinjuku no Yotamono (1970) - Big Brother Katsumata
- Shin Kyōdai Jingi (1970)
- Sengo Hiwa, Hoseki Ryakudatsu (1970)
- Nihon Jokyo-den: Tekka Geisha (1970) - Yukichi
- Gokudo Kyojo Tabi (1970) - Izumi Tatsuya
- Gendai Ninkyō Kyōdai-bun (1970)
- Furyo Bancho Kuchi Kara Demakase (1970)
- Bākuto Jingi: Sākazukî (1970)
- Kantō Tekiya Ikka: Goromen Himatsuri (1971)
- Kigeki Toruko-buro Osho-sen (1971)
- Kantō Kyōdai Jingi Ninkyō (1971) - Takazaki Taichiro
- Nippon Jokyō-den: Gekitō Himeyuri-misaki (1971)
- Gendai Yakuza: Chizakura san Kyodai (1971)
- Onna Toseinin: Ota no Mushimasu (1971)
- Mamushi no Kyōdai: Orei Mairi (1971)
- Gendai Yakuza: Sakazuki Kaeshimasu (1971)
- Furyo Bancho Yarazu Buttakuri (1971)
- Chōeki Tarō: Mamushi no Kyōdai (1971)
- Akū Oyabūn tai Daigashî (1971)
- Wicked Priest 5: Blood on the Commandments (1971) - Ryotatsu
- Red Peony Gambler: Execution of Duty (1972)
- Mamushi no Kyōdai: Chōeki Jūsankai (1972)
- Junko Intai Kinen Eiga: Kantō Hizakura Ikka (1972) - Yuijiro
- Street Mobster (1972) - Isamu Okita
- Gokudo Makari Touru (1972) - Ishido Tsuneo
- Mamushi no Kyōdai: Shōgai Kyōkatsu Jūhappan (1972)
- Kogarashi Monjirō: Kakawari Gozansen (1972) - Monjirō Kogarashi
- Outlaw Killers: Three Mad Dog Brothers (1972)
- Hijirimen Bakuto (1972)
- Yakuza to Kōsō: Jitsuroku Andō-gumi (1972)
- Kogarashi Monjirō (1972) - Monjirō
- Furyo Gai (1972)
- Bakuchi-uchi Gaiden (1972)
- Battles Without Honor and Humanity (1973) - Shozo Hirono
- Mamushi no Kyōdai: Musho Gurashi Yonen-han (1973)
- Battles Without Honor and Humanity: Deadly Fight in Hiroshima (1973) - Shozo Hirono
- Yakuza tai G-men (1973) - Lee Chung Shun, Narcotics Group Boss
- Mamushi no Kyōdai: Kyōkatsu San-oku-en (1973)
- Tokyo-Seoul-Bangkok (1973)
- Battles Without Honor and Humanity: Proxy War (1973) - Shozo Hirono
- Yokosuka Navy Prison (1973)
- Yamaguchi-gumi San-daime (1973) - Big Boss Hachiro
- Kāigun o Shu ga Kēimushyō (1973)
- Battles Without Honor and Humanity: Police Tactics (1974) - Shozo Hirono
- Gakusei Yakuza (1974)
- Violent Streets (1974) - Tatsu
- Lubang Tō no Kiseki: Rikugun Nakano Gakkō (1974)
- Battles Without Honor and Humanity: Final Episode (1974) - Shozo Hirono
- Gokudo VS Mamushi (1974)
- Andō-gumi Gaiden: Hitokiri Shatei (1974)
- New Battles Without Honor and Humanity (1974) - Miyoshi Makio
- Mamushi no Kyōdai: Futari Awasete Sanjuppan (1974) - Masataro of Mamushi's
- Jitsuroku Hishyakaku Ōkami Domo no Jingi (1974) - Ishikuro Hikoichi
- Â Kessen Kōkūtai (1974)
- Mamushi to Aodaishō (1975) - Goromasa
- Dai Dâtsu Gokū (1975)
- Daidatsugoku (1975) - Kunizo Kuniiwa
- Cops vs. Thugs (1975) - Detective Kuno
- Torakku Yarō: Goiken Muyō (1975) - Momojirō Hoshi - Ichibanboshi
- Kobe Kokusai Gang (1975) - Kenzo Otaki
- New Battles Without Honor and Humanity: The Boss's Head (1975) - Shuji Kuroda
- Torakku Yarō: Bakusō Ichibanboshi (1975)
- New Battles Without Honor and Humanity: Last Days of the Boss (1976) - Shuichi Nozaki
- Torakku Yarō: Bōkyō Ichibanboshi (1976)
- Baka Masa Hora Masa Toppa Masa (1976) - Bakamasa
- Torakku Yarō: Tenka Gomen (1976)
- Yamaguchi-gumi Gaiden: Kyushu Shinko-sakusen (1977) - Yozakura
- Yakuza Senso: Nihon no Don (1977) - Eizo Iwami
- Nihon no Jingi (1977)
- Torakku Yarō: Dokyō Ichibanboshi (1977)
- The Boxer (1977) - Hayato
- Nippon no Don: Yabohen (1977) - Shinsuke Tembo
- Torakku Yarō: Otoko Ippiki Momojirō (1977)
- Shinjuku Yoidore Banchi: Hitokiri Tetsu (1977)
- Inubue (1978) - Shiro Akitsu
- Torakku Yarō: Totsugeki Ichiban Hoshi (1978) - Hoshi Momojiro
- Dynamite Dondon (1978) - Kasuke
- Nihon no Don: Kanketsuhen (1978) - Akira Kawanishi
- Yokohama Ankokugai Mashingan no Ryu (1978) - Ryuta Yabuki
- Torakku Yarō: Ichiban Hoshi Kita e Kaeru (1978) - Hoshi Momojiro
- Sochō no Kubi (1979) - Hachiyo Shunji
- Ogon no Inu (1979) - Lorry driver
- Torakku Yarō: Neppū 5000 Kiro (1979) - Hoshi Momojiro
- Taiyō o Nusunda Otoko (1979) - Inspector Yamashita
- Dabide no Hoshi: Bishōjo-gari (1979) - Momojirō Hoshi
- Torakku Yarō: Furusato Tokkyūbin (1979) - Hoshi Momojiro
- Battles Without Honor and Humanity: The Complete Saga (1980) - Shozo Hirono
- The Gate of Youth (1981) - Shigezo Ibuki
- Honō no Gotoku (1981) - Senkichi Kotetsu
- Yūkai Hōdō (1982) - Pilot
- Seiha (1982) - Koji Kawakami
- Shura no Mure (1984)
- The Burmese Harp (1985) - Platoon Commander
- Rokumeikan (1986) - Count Kageyama
- Eiga Joyū (1987) - Kenji Mizoguchi
- Kuroi Doresu no Onna (1987) - Shoji
- Za Samurai (1987) - Samurai
- Tsuru (1988) - Rich man
- Yawara! (1989) - Kojiro Inokuma
- My Phoenix (1989)
- Yellow Fangs (1990) - Kasuke
- Tekken (1990) - Seiji Nakamoto
- Distant Justice (1992) - Rio Yuki
- The Man Who Shot the Don (1994)
- Kizu Darake no Tenshi (1997) - Joji Kurai
- Dora-heita (2000) - Nadanamiya Hachirobe, aka Daikashi no Nadahachi
- Watashi no Grandpa (2003) - Godai Kenzo
- The Great Yokai War (2005) - Shuntaro Ino
- The Battery (2007) - Yozo Ioka
- Chikyū de Tatta Futari (2008)

=== Anime ===
- Spirited Away (2001) - Kamajî
- The Snow Queen (2005–2006)
- Tales from Earthsea (2006) - Ged/Sparrowhawk
- Wolf Children (2012) - Nirasaki (final film role)

=== Television ===
- Shishi no Jidai (1980) - Hiranuma Senji
- Musashibō Benkei (1986) - Minamoto no Yoritomo
- Takeda Shingen (1988) - Itagaki Nobukata
- Furuhata Ninzaburō (1994) - Otojiro Kogure
- Tokugawa Yoshinobu (1998) - Tokugawa Nariaki
- Toshiie and Matsu (2002) - Maeda Toshimasa

=== Video games ===
- Dissidia: Final Fantasy (2008) - Cid / Narrator
- Dissidia 012 Final Fantasy (2011) - Cid / Narrator
- Stranger Than Heaven (2027) - Genzo Iwaki (likeness)

=== Dubbing ===
- Samurai Jack - Aku
