= Ion Zupcu =

Romanian fine art photographer

Ion Zupcu is a fine art photographer who was born in Romania in 1960. He has recently shown photographs of his own minimalist still lifes in various museums and galleries throughout the United States. He initially studied photography in Romania in 1982, but this study was interrupted when he emigrated to the United States. In order to support his family who remained in Romania, he drove a taxi cab in New York City. After a chance meeting while driving this taxi, he was able to resume his practice when offered access to a darkroom.

== Biography ==
In 1993, he began studying at the International Center for Photography in New York, where he was greatly influenced by the work of Ansel Adams. Zupcu's first project to gain attention was a series of still life photographs featuring flowers. His next significant project involved photographing small scenes, often as small as 1 inch in size, using a square format Hasselblad camera. Through his construction of these small scenes utilizing flowers, cut paper and painted cubes, and his use of light manipulation and silver gelatin printing techniques, he succeeded in incorporating abstraction, sculpture, and painting into photography

His recent series of cubes demonstrate the influence of 20th century modernist photographers, such as Josef Albers, whose work centered on monochromatic still lifes. Painted Cubes, which opened at the ClampArt Gallery in New York City on April 15, 2010, has been deemed reminiscent of the minimalist cubes of sculptor Donald Judd and the paintings of Robert Ryman In the New Yorker review, it was remarked that,

Alongside photographs of his own paintings of cubes, Zupcu shows delicate double exposures of patterns, in which the play of solid and ephemeral geometries parallels his deft manipulation of the infinite shadings between black and white.

In a 2008 interview with Chronogram magazine, Zupcu remarked,

Photography is not about the camera . It’s about the eye, and what my thoughts are. The camera doesn’t say anything

As of 2010, Zupcu has held solo exhibitions at galleries such as ClampArt Gallery (New York City), Studio391 (Gualala, California) and national museums such as the Museum of Fine Arts in Houston and the Detroit Institute of Art, among others.

- 2025 Ellen Miller Gallery: Color Works, Boston, MA
- 2021 ClampArt Gallery:"Etudes on Glass", New York, NY
- 2019 ClampArt Gallery:"Sculptures", New York, NY
- 2015 Miller Yezersky Gallery:"KAZIMIRS", Boston, MA
- 2011 Gallery 339:"Painted Cubes", Philadelphia, PA
- 2011 Woodstock Artists Association and Museum, New York, NY
- 2010 ClampArt Gallery, New York, NY
- 2010 Miller Block Gallery, Boston, MA
- 2009 Works on Paper, Gallery 339 Philadelphia, PA
- 2008 The Camera Lies, Center for Photography at Woodstock, NY
- 2008 ClampArt Gallery, March 27- May 3, New York, NY
- 2006 Studio 391, Gualala, CA
- 2006 Ialomita County Museum of Art, Romania
- 2005 Halsted Gallery, Bloomfield Hills, MI
- 2005 Clamp Art Gallery, New York, NY
- 2005 Lexington Art Gallery, Lexington, VA
- 2004 Studio391, Gualala, CA
- 2004 Tulla Booth Gallery. Sag Harbor, NY
- 2004 Lexington Art Gallery, Lexington, VA
- 2004 Hoopers Gallery, London, England
- 2004 Still Life, Candace Perich Gallery, Katonah, New York
- 2004 Metroforum Gallery, Tucson, AZ
- 2003 Fay Gold Gallery, Atlanta, GA
- 2003 John Cleary Gallery, Houston, TX
- 2003 Tulla Booth Gallery, Sag Harbor, NY
- 2003 The Photography Room Gallery, Grand Rapids, MI
- 2003 Edward Carter Gallery, New York, NY
- 2003 White Room Gallery, West Hollywood, CA
- 2002 Candace Perich Gallery, Katonah, NY
- 2002 Van Brunt Gallery, Beacon, NY
- 2002 Tao Design Gallery, Hong Kong
- 2002 John Cleary Gallery, Houston, TX
- 2002 Sag Harbor Picture Gallery, Sag Harbor, NY
- 2001 Beacon Gallery, Bellpport, NY
- 2001 Mercedes Benz, New York, NY
- 2000 Romanian Cultural Center, New York, NY
- 2000 SOHO Photo Gallery, New York, NY

== Public collections ==
- Ialomita County Museum of Art, Romania
- Dayton Art Institute, Dayton, OH
- Dennos Museum Center, MI
- University of Michigan Museum of Art
- Detroit Institute of Art, Detroit, MI
- Kresge Art Museum, MI
- University of Louisville, Louisville, KY
- UNM Art Museum, Albuquerque, NM
- Fidelity Investments
- The Museum of Fine Arts, Houston, TX
