= Hibi =

Hibi or HIBI may refer to:

- Hibi (surname), Japanese surname
- Hibi (film)
- Hibi Eden (born 1983), Indian politician
- Hypoxic-ischemic brain injury
