= Noboru Ando =

Japanese actor and former yakuza (1926–2015)

- 安藤 昇
- Born: 24 May 1926; Ōkubo, Tokyo, Japan
- Died: 16 December 2015 (aged 89); Tokyo, Japan
- Occupations: Actor; writer; singer
- Years active: 1965–2015

Noboru Ando (Japanese: 安藤 昇, Hepburn: Andō Noboru; 24 May 1926 – 16 December 2015) was a Japanese actor, writer, singer and former yakuza. He is known for utilizing his experiences as a criminal in his many roles in yakuza films. He had a large knife scar on his left cheek, the result of a brawl with a Korean gangster as a young man.

== Life and career ==
Noboru Ando was born in Higashi, Ōkubo, Tokyo, the oldest of four children to a father of samurai descent. After going to primary school in Yokohama he entered junior high in Manchuria, where his father was working, but returned to Tokyo to live with relatives when he was expelled. He was expelled from another school after only three months and began running with other delinquents, before being sent to a reformatory school for theft. He entered the military for pilot training in December 1943 and in June 1945 volunteered for a suicide frogman unit, though the war ended before he saw action. When he returned to Tokyo, he entered Hosei University, although he continued his gangster behavior and dropped out in May 1948.

Ando formed his own yakuza family in 1952, the Ando-gumi (ja:安藤組, Andō-gumi), that was mainly composed of bad-boy former college kids. With more than 300 members at its peak, the group operated in the Shibuya district. Operating under the name Azuma Kogyo (東興業), they had legitimate real estate and entertainment companies such as night clubs. In June 1958, a hitman sent by Ando shot businessman Hideki Yokoi. Yokoi had insulted Ando when his gang were hired to collect a debt Yokoi owed. Sought by the police, Ando was hidden by his mistress Yoko Yamaguchi in her Yoyogi apartment. Ando was arrested in Hayama after 35 days on the run and served six years in prison. When he was released in December 1964, he formally dissolved his yakuza family citing the death of one of his men and talking to that man's mother. Author George Abe was a former member of the Ando-gumi.

Soon after disbanding his gang, Ando was approached by a producer from Shochiku. He had his first acting role in 1965's Blood and Rules, a film about himself. Following its success, he demanded, and received, a ¥20 million contract to work exclusively for the studio. According to Ando, acting came easily to him as a result of his underworld life: "In Japanese, the only difference between yakuza and yakusha (actor) is one hiragana character," he has been quoted as saying. "All yakuza have to be actors to survive." He starred in three films by Tai Kato; By a Man's Face Shall You Know Him, Opium Heights: Hell Squad Attack (both 1966), and 1967's Eighteen Years in Prison. In 1967, Koji Shundo, a producer at Toei and former yakuza himself, lured Ando to Toei. This violated the Five-Company Agreement and an automatic extension in his contract with Shochiku, but was ultimately allowed given Ando's unfamiliarity with the workings of the film industry. He appeared in a total of 51 Toei films including Teruo Ishii's Abashiri Bangaichi: Fubuki no Toso (1967) and Gendai Ninkyoshi (1973) as well as Kinji Fukasaku's Japan Organized Crime Boss (1969), Sympathy for the Underdog (1971), Street Mobster (1972), New Battles Without Honor and Humanity (1974) and Graveyard of Honor (1975).

In the 1970s, Ando was also a singer signed to Canyon Records. Through the years he starred in several more films detailing his and his yakuza family's history, including Ando Noboru no Waga Tobou to Sex no Kiroku (1976), which depicted his sexual escapades while on the run from police. After appearing in Sadao Nakajima's The Big Boss's Head in 1979, Ando largely retired from acting. He occasionally served as producer, such as on 1988's Bruise by Shunichi Kajima, and wrote novels. He resumed acting in 1997, this time in straight to video films. In 2002, he served as supervisor on Takashi Miike's Deadly Outlaw: Rekka, which is loosely based on the actor's experiences.

On 16 December 2015, Ando died of pneumonia in a Tokyo hospital at the age of 89. A farewell service was held on 28 February 2016 at Aoyama Funeral Home in Aoyama, Tokyo. It was attended by an estimated 700 people, including Nakajima, Junya Sato, Yasuo Furuhata, Tatsuo Umemiya, and Yoshiko Mita.

== Filmography ==
- Chi to Okite (血と掟; "Blood and Rules") (1965)
- Yasagure no Okite (1965)
- Tōbō to Okite (1965)
- Bōkyō to Okite (1966)
- Honō to Okite (1966) - Shin Nanjō
- By a Man's Face Shall You Know Him (1966) - Dr. Amamiya
- Ahendaichi Jigokubutai Totsugekiseyo (1966)
- Ōtoko no Kao wa Kuri Fūda (1966)
- Kyōkaku-dō (1967)
- Gyangu no Teiō (1967)
- Abashiri Bangaichi: Fubuki no Tōsō (1967) - Todoroki
- Zoku Soshiki Bōryoku (1967) - Kenji Kunisaki
- Nihon Ankokushi: Chī no Kōsō (1967)
- Hakuchū no Zansatsū (1967)
- Eighteen Years in Prison (1967)
- Eighteen Years in Prison: Kari Shutsugoku (1967)
- Nippon Ankokushi: Nasake Muyō (1968)
- Tarekomi (1969) - Mamoru Sagara
- Yakuza Hijoshi - Mushyo Kyodai (1969)
- Yakuza Hijoshi-chi no Sakazuki (1969)
- Soshiki Boryoku: Kyodai Sakazuki (1969)
- Showa Yakuza Keizu - Nagasaki no Kao (1969)
- Japan Organized Crime Boss (1969) - Ooba
- Yakuza Hijoshi-chi no Kechaku (1970)
- Sympathy for the Underdog (1971) - Shark
- The Wolves (1971) - Gunjiro Ozeki
- Shin Abashiri Bangaichi: Arashi Yobu Shiretoko-misaki (1971)
- Shin Abashiri Bangaichi: Fubuki no Dai Dassō (1971)
- Mamushi no Kyōdai: Orei Mairi (1971)
- Chôeki Tarō: Mamushi no Kyōdai (1971)
- Gyangu tai Gyangu: Aka to Kuro no Burūsu (1972)
- Street Mobster (1972) - Boss Yato
- Yakuza to Kōsō (1972) - Ando
- Yakuza to Kōsō: Jitsuroku Andō-gumi (1972)
- Showa Zankyo-den: Yabure-gasa (1972)
- Jitsuroku Andō-gumi Shugekihen ("The True Story of the Ando Gang: Attack") (1973)
- A True Story of the Private Ginza Police (1973)
- Gendai Ninkyō-shi (1973) - Mitsuo Kurata
- Jitsuroku Andō-gumi: Shūgeki-hen (1973)
- Violent Streets (1974) - Egawa
- Karajishi Keisatsu (1974)
- San-daime Shumei (1974)
- The Homeless (1974)
- Andō-gumi Gaiden Hitokiri Shatei ("The Untold Story of the Ando Gang: The Killer Brother") (1974)
- New Battles Without Honor and Humanity (1974) - Unokichi Kaizu
- Hijo Gakuen Waru - Nerikan Dokisei (1974)
- Ā Kessen Kōkūtai (1974)
- Graveyard of Honor (1975) - Ryunosuke Nozu
- Ando Noboru no Waga Tobou to Sex no Kiroku (1976) - Himself
- Genkai-nada (1976) - Kondo
- Sochō no Kubi (1979) - Shozo Hanamori
- The True Face of Shinjuku: The Story of the Shinjuku Delinquent Gangs (1997)
- Yakuza Tosei no Sutekina Menmen (1998)
- The True History of the Ando Gang: Rules of the Starving Wolf (2002) - Himself in the present day / Narrator
- Shibuya Monogatari (2005) - (final film role)

== Bibliography ==
=== Books ===
- Gekidō Chi Nura Reta Hansei (1968)
- Andō Noboru Gokudō Ichi-dai Yakuza to Kōsō (Garō-hen) (1972)
- Andō Noboru Gokudō Ichi-dai Yakuza to Kōsō (Hayate-hen) (1972)
- Andō Noboru Gokudō Ichi-dai Yakuza to Kōsō (Kanketsu-hen) (1972)
- Yakuza no Fu (Fūun-hen) (1973)
- Yakuza no Fu (Gekijō-hen) (1973)
- Yakuza no Shiro (1976)
- Ryōdo Gōdatsu Dokyumento Hokkai no Bakuto-tachi (1978)
- Tōkai no Setsuninken (1982)
- Gun Ōkami no Keifu (1983)
- On'na ni Motetakya Otoko o Migake - Ore no Otoko Shūgyō On'na Shūgyō Jinsei Shūgyō (1988)
- Ageman Nyūmon - Kon'na On'na to wa, Sugu Wakarero! (1990)
- Fashionable Tosei - Hoero! Otoko-tachi yo! (1991)
- Sakura Sakukoro ni... - Andō-gumi Gaiden Gekiryū ni Ikiru Otoko Takahashi Masayuki no Han'nama (1993)
- Kumon On'na Sōjutsu - Asoko de Minuku, Tsuki o Yobu On'na, Ubau On'na (1993)
- Andō-ryū Gorin-sho (1995)
- Otoko no Iroke ― Kakugo o Kimeta TokiKara, Otoko wa Ī Kao ni Naru (1997)
- Ura Shakai no Okite (1998)
- Jiden Andō Noboru (2001)
- Furachi Zanmai - Waga Kahanshin no Shōwa-shi (2001)
- Movie Star Ando Noboru (2002)
- Zaregoto - Jinsei no Lost Time ni Omou (2006)
- Andō Noboru Ōja no Non'nō (2008)
- Jinsei o Kaeru Kumon 'Kasō' Jutsu (2009)
- Otoko no Kakugo (2009)
- Irogoto no Hinkaku - Otona no Otoko no Ikina Asobikata (2010)
- Andō Noboru no Sengo Yakuza-shi Shōwa Fūun-roku (2012)
- Otoko no Shimai Shitaku (2012)
- Otoko Sanka (2014)
- Otoko no Hin'i (2015)
- Otona no Otome no Shikiyoku Shugyō (2022)

=== Manga ===
- Garō Ichi-dai Jitsuroku Andō Noboru Ichidaiki (1984–1987) - Illustrated by Ken Nakajo
- Buya Jitsuroku Andō-gumi (1992–1994) - Composed by Tadashi Mukaidani, illustrated by Takeshi Kanda
- Garō no Keifu - Jitsuroku Andō-gumi (2001–2002) - Composed by Tadashi Mukaidani, illustrated by Takeshi Kanda

== Discography ==
- Otoko no Aika (1970)
- Sasurai Higanbana (1971)
- Tabikasa Dōchū - Kage wo Shitaite (1972)
- Sakariba Ni Jū-nen Andō Noboru no Sekai (1973)
- Sendōko Uta (1974)
- Gunka de Tsudzuru Taiheiyō Senshi (1976)
- Otoko no Hitori-goto (1977)
