= Graveyard of Honor (1975 film) =

- Theatrical release poster
- Directed by: Kinji Fukasaku
- Written by: Tatsuhiko Kamoi
- Based on: Jingi no Hakaba by Fujita Goro
- Produced by: Tatsuo Yoshida
- Starring: Tetsuya Watari
- Cinematography: Hanjiro Nakazawa
- Edited by: Osamu Tanaka
- Music by: Toshiaki Tsushima
- Distributed by: Toei
- Release date: February 15, 1975
- Running time: 94 minutes
- Country: Japan
- Language: Japanese

Graveyard of Honor (Japanese: 仁義の墓場, Hepburn: Jingi no Hakaba) is a 1975 Japanese yakuza film directed by Kinji Fukasaku. Written by Tatsuhiko Kamoi, it adapts Fujita Goro's novel of the same name. It is based on the life of real-life yakuza member Rikio Ishikawa, who is played by Tetsuya Watari. Noboru Ando, who plays Ryunosuke Nozu, was actually a yakuza member before becoming an actor.

Home Vision Entertainment released the movie on DVD in North America in 2004. Takashi Miike directed a remake of it in 2002.

== Plot ==
Rikio Ishikawa, a member of the Kawada yakuza family in Shinjuku, assaults and steals money from the Aoki gang, members of the rival Shinwa family from Ikebukuro, for operating in their territory. Ishikawa then robs a Sangokujin gambling den with Imai, whom he had become friends with in prison and who asks Ishikawa to join his gang; he stashes his gun with a geisha named Chieko. After being released from jail that night, he returns for the gun and rapes her.

The Nozu family boss is running for parliament, and is associated with the Kawada family. When Ishikawa severely wounds Aoki after finding him in one of their clubs, he is scolded for this by Kawada, who is worried the Shinwa might retaliate. Both the Shinwa and Kawada families gather and arm themselves in a standoff that is only ended when Kawada pays the American Military Police to disperse them. However, Nozu loses the election and when he lectures Ishikawa, Ishikawa blows up his car. Ishikawa is severely beaten and told to commit yubitsume; however, he gets drunk, stabs boss Kawada and flees to Chieko before turning himself into police some days later. Having committed an unforgivable offense, he is banished from the Tokyo yakuza for 10 years, and retreats to Osaka upon his release from prison. There, he becomes addicted to drugs and fast friends with fellow junkie Ozaki.

A year and a half later, Ishikawa returns to Tokyo with Ozaki. Imai tries to get his old friend to leave as he is now the boss of his own family and has to abide by the yakuza ban. But Ishikawa, having reunited with Chieko and being as strong-headed as ever, refuses and attacks Imai with Ozaki before hiding. After returning to kill Imai, Ishikawa holes up in a building with Ozaki facing police and both the Imai and Kawada families. After being detained and arrested Ishikawa is sentenced to 10 years, but using funds raised by Chieko is able to make bail while he appeals the decision.

Making bail, he attempts to pay his respects to Imai's widow, but is turned away and spends his days shooting drugs and taking care of the ill Chieko until she commits suicide. He orders a gravestone made for three people before asking Kawada if he can start his own family while eating Chieko's remains. Kawada initially approves giving him some turf, before walking away because of the bizarre situation and Ishikawa's asking for a large sum of money. Ishikawa remarks he will return, and later robs a Kawada family member. While injecting drugs in a cemetery, he is attacked by the Kawada family with swords. He survives, but his appeal is denied and he is sent back to prison. After six years in jail, Ishikawa commits suicide by jumping off the prison - leaving the note "What a laugh! Thirty Years of Madness!" on his cell wall. He is buried at the gravestone he had made, which also lists Imai.

== Cast ==
- Tetsuya Watari as Rikio Ishikawa
- Tatsuo Umemiya as Kozaburo Imai
- Yumi Takigawa as Chieko Ishikawa
- Noboru Ando as Kisaburo Nozu
- Hajime Hana as Shuzo Kawada
- Hideo Murota as Yoshioka
- Harumi Sone as Satoshi Toyama
- Tadashi Takatsuki as Tani
- Eiji Go as Makoto Sugiura
- Mikio Narita as Noboru Nemoto
- Kunie Tanaka as Katsuji Ozaki
- Toshiyuki Tsuchiyama as Takeda
- Kenji Imai as Masaki Aoki
- Shingo Yamashiro as Takuji Tamura
- Tetsuo Maekawa as Kano
- Takeshige Hatanaka as Akira
- Jo Haruki as Goro
- Akira Shioji as Jotatsu
- Reiko Ike as Teruko Imai
- Meika Seri as Osaka whore
- Torahiko Hamada as police chief
- Hiroshi Kondo as police deputy director
- Isao Tamagawa as Okabe
- Chie Kobayashi as Kawada's concubine
- Noboru Mitani as grave carver
- Saburo Date as oyabun
- Ryoko Ema as Natsuko
- Kenji Kawai as criminal
- Koji Sekiyama as criminal

== Production ==
Assistant director Kenichi Oguri recalls that the February 1975 release date for Graveyard of Honor was set beforehand, with filming beginning in December of the previous year or January. Due to a strike at Toei, he and the other assistant directors joined the team after the third or fourth day of filming, beginning the same day they got the script. Editing of the footage was being done alongside filming.

Oguri stated that realism is the essence of a Fukasaku film. He claimed that the director preferred actors that would go the distance in physical scenes, and that they were the ones who would be recast in subsequent films. Ishikawa's suicide scene was shot with a stuntman jumping from a four-story building onto cardboard boxes placed on a gymnastics mat.

== Reception ==
Graveyard of Honor won Fukasaku the 1976 Blue Ribbon Award for Best Director. In 1999, Kinema Junpo listed the film tied with several others at number 38 on their aggregated list of the Top 100 Japanese Films of All Time as voted by over one hundred film critics and writers. Four years earlier, it was one of the films tied at 80.

Glenn Erickson of DVD Talk wrote that despite Graveyard of Honor aiming for originality amongst the 1970s' violent and nihilistic yakuza films with its 'true biography' account of Ishikawa, viewers never learn much about him, so he never becomes an interesting character. He also criticized Fukasaku for frequently opting for visuals that "express little but disorganized chaos".
