= Soshiki Bōryoku series =

Japanese yakuza film series (1967–1969)

Soshiki Bōryoku
- DVD cover
- Directed by: Junya Sato
- Screenplay by: Susumu Saji; Michio Suzuki
- Starring: Tetsuro Tamba; Sonny Chiba; Ryūnosuke Tsukigata
- Cinematography: Hanjirō Nakazawa
- Edited by: Osamu Tanaka
- Music by: Masaru Sato
- Distributed by: Toei Company
- Release date: February 25, 1967 (Japan)
- Running time: 90 minutes
- Country: Japan
- Language: Japanese

Zoku Soshiki Bōryoku
- Film poster
- Directed by: Junya Sato
- Written by: Yoshihiro Ishimatsu
- Produced by: Tomio Kuriyama; Kōji Shundō; Wataru Yabe
- Starring: Tetsuro Tamba; Noboru Ando; Shigeru Tsuyuguchi; Fumio Watanabe
- Cinematography: Hanjirō Nakazawa
- Edited by: Osamu Tanaka
- Music by: Masaru Sato
- Distributed by: Toei Company
- Release date: June 29, 1967 (Japan)
- Running time: 90 minutes
- Country: Japan
- Language: Japanese

Soshiki Bōryoku: Kyōdai Sakazuki
- Film poster
- Directed by: Junya Sato
- Written by: Yoshihiro Ishimatsu
- Starring: Bunta Sugawara; Noboru Ando; Kanjuro Arashi; Fumio Watanabe
- Cinematography: Masahiko Iimura
- Edited by: Yoshiki Nagasawa
- Music by: Shunsuke Kikuchi
- Distributed by: Toei Company
- Release date: September 6, 1969 (Japan)
- Running time: 93 minutes
- Country: Japan
- Language: Japanese

Soshiki Bōryoku series (Japanese: 組織暴力シリーズ) is a Japanese yakuza film series directed by Junya Sato.

== Soshiki Bōryoku ==
- Tetsuro Tamba as Detective Uragami
- Sonny Chiba as Takasugi Shinji
- Ryūnosuke Tsukigata as Otaguro Shodo
- Fumio Watanabe as Imanishi
- Ryōhei Uchida as Teramachi
- Nobuo Yana
- Hideo Murota as Detective Horiike
- Hisashi Igawa as Detective Ashida
- Nenji Kobayashi as Chorokichi
- Tatsuo Matsumura as Kuribayashi
- Kōji Tsuruta (Special appearance)

== Zoku Soshiki Bōryoku ==
- Tetsurō Tamba as Detective Kitagawa
- Fumio Watanabe as Hōdō Gorō
- Kyōsuke Machida as Ishigami
- Ryōhei Uchida as Sakaki Shinsaku
- Hayato Tani as Sugii
- Hideo Murota as sawai
- Rinichi Yamamoto as Nakanishi
- Nobuo Yana as Shiraki
- Kenji Imai as Nakagawa
- Shigeru Tsuyuguchi as Tazawa
- Noboru Ando as Kunisaki Kenji

== Soshiki Bōryoku Kyōdaisakazuki ==
- Bunta Sugawara as Kijima Naojirō
- Noboru Ando as Oba Kenji
- Fumio Watanabe as Takegami Mansaku
- Hitomi Nozoe as Nobuko
- Kanjūrō Arashi as Daimon Shinsaku
- Nobuo Yana as Tetsu
- Shingo Yamashiro as Tokuzo
- Kei Taguchi as Irie
- Hiroshi Miyauchi
- Nenji Kobayashi
- Kyōsuke Machida as Tsugaya
- Tetsurō Tamba as Wajima Taichirō
