= Wandering Ginza Butterfly 2: She-Cat Gambler =

1972 film

- Poster
- Directed by: Kazuhiko Yamaguchi
- Written by: Kazuhiko Yamaguchi; Isao Matsumoto
- Starring: Meiko Kaji; Sonny Chiba
- Music by: Toshiaki Tsushima
- Distributed by: Toei
- Release date: 1972 (Japan)
- Running time: 86 minutes
- Country: Japan
- Language: Japanese

Wandering Ginza Butterfly 2: She-Cat Gambler (Japanese: 銀蝶流れ者 牝猫博奕, Hepburn: Ginchō Nagaremono: Mesuneko Bakuchi) is a 1972 Japanese film, which is a sequel to Wandering Ginza Butterfly. The film was directed by Kazuhiko Yamaguchi, who co-wrote it with Isao Matsumoto. The film stars Meiko Kaji and Sonny Chiba.

== Plot ==
Seeking revenge for the death of her father, Nami is now on the hunt for Hoshiden. After arriving in Tokyo, Nami once again becomes a hostess at a Ginza club, while searching every alley and gambling spot for Hoshiden, with the help of Ryuji.

== Cast ==
- Meiko Kaji as Nami Higuchi
- Junzaburo Ban as Asai Senzo
- Tamayo Mitsukawa as Asai Hanae
- Shingo Yamashiro as Karashishi Monjiro
- Yukie Kagawa as Miyoko
- Hideo Murota as Tadokoro
- Akira Kume as Tani
- Fujio Suga as Aihoshi
- Sonny Chiba as Higashi Ryuji
