= Gendai Yakuza: Yotamono Jingi =

Japanese movie

- DVD cover
- Directed by: Yasuo Furuhata
- Screenplay by: Norio Nagata; Akira Murao
- Produced by: Koji Goto
- Starring: Bunta Sugawara; Masakazu Tamura; Fumio Watanabe; Yoshie Mizutani; Tadao Nakamuru; Nobuo Yana; Ryō Ikebe
- Cinematography: Giichi Yamazawa
- Edited by: Yoshiki Nagasawa
- Music by: Shunsuke Kikuchi
- Production company: Toei
- Distributed by: Toei
- Release date: May 31, 1969 (Japan)
- Running time: 92 minutes
- Country: Japan
- Language: Japanese

Gendai Yakuza: Yotamono Jingi (Japanese: 現代やくざ 与太者仁義), also known as A Modern Yakuza: Humanity and Justice of the Outlaw, is a 1969 Japanese yakuza film directed by Yasuo Furuhata. It is the second film in Gendai Yakuza, a series of yakuza films made in the late 1960s and 1970s.

== Plot ==
The film centers around three brothers, who are all born into poverty and raised in a slum. The eldest son, Kōichi, becomes a powerful gang leader, the second son, Gorō, is a lone wolf fighting on his own terms, and the third son, Tōru, is alive but lacks a purpose to guide his life. The world of Japanese organized crime soon drags all three brothers into a horrific struggle of hatred and revenge.

== Cast ==
- Bunta Sugawara as Katsumata Gorō
- Masakazu Tamura as Katsumata Tōru (Gorō's younger brother)
- Fumio Watanabe as Yamazaki
- Yoshie Mizutani as Misa
- Tadao Nakamuru as Kuroda
- Ai Sasaki as Reiko
- Nobuo Yana as Itō
- Ryō Ikebe as Katsumata Koichi (Gorō's elder brother)

== See also ==
- Gendai Yakuza: Hitokiri Yota, the sixth Gendai Yakuza film, which also featured Sugawara as the lead.
