= A Haunted Turkish Bathhouse =

1975 Japanese horror film

- Promotional release poster

Japanese name
- Kanji: 怪猫トルコ風呂
Transcriptions
- Revised Hepburn: Kaibyō Toruko furo
- Directed by: Kazuhiko Yamaguchi
- Written by: Masahiro Kakefuda; Nobuaki Nakajima
- Starring: Naomi Tani
- Music by: Jun Fukamachi
- Production company: Toei Company
- Release date: 1975 (Japan)
- Running time: 81 minutes
- Country: Japan
- Language: Japanese

A Haunted Turkish Bathhouse (Japanese: 怪猫トルコ風呂, Hepburn: Kaibyō Toruko furo) is a 1975 Japanese erotic horror film directed by Kazuhiko Yamaguchi. More specifically, it belongs to the kaibyō eiga or bakeneko mono subgenre of horror films, in which the spirit of a vengeful woman manifests in the form of a "Monster cat" or "ghost cat", as happens in this film.

== Cast ==
- Naomi Tani as Yukino
- Hideo Murota as Yuzo
- Misa Ohara as Mayumi, Yukino's sister
- Taiji Tonoyama as Genzō Kakinuma, bathhouse manager
- Tomoko Mayama as Utae Kakinuma, Genzō's second wife
- Terumi Azuma as Natsuyo Kakinuma, Genzō's daughter
- Kōji Fujiyama as Toriyama, bathhouse manager
- Sami Suzuki as Saburō, bathhouse manager
- Shingo Yamashiro as Young Master

== Reception ==
In 2022, a 2K restoration of the film was released on Blu-ray in Region A by Mondo Macabro.
