= Peanuts (1996 film) =

1996 Japanese yakuza film

- Directed by: Takashi Miike
- Written by: Jirō Asada (story); Masahide Motohashi; Tetsuo Inoue (screenplay)
- Produced by: Yuukan Kikuchi; Noriko Yamashita
- Cinematography: Noboru Ono (as Noboru Obino)
- Music by: Toshiaki Tsushima
- Release date: May 17, 1996
- Running time: 87 minutes
- Language: Japanese

Peanuts (Japanese: 落華星 ピイナッツ, Hepburn: Rakkasei: Piinattsu) is a 1996 Japanese action-comedy film directed by Takashi Miike.

== Plot ==
Two mysterious tough guys, Ryuji Hoshikawa and Kyotaro Ochiai, win money at the track but have some of their winnings swindled by Tetsu, a member of the Hyakkikai posing as a car dealer. Mr. Makimura, an elderly fish seller, cannot pay off his debts to the Hyakkikai so he jumps in front of a car being driven by Ryuji and Kyotaro but they stop in time and help him by robbing a Hyakkikai gambling den and giving him most of the money in order to repay his debt.

Kurogane Mitsuko, head of the Kurogane gang controlling the Hyakkikai, bribes the detective Mr. Yabe to investigate the robbery then has the pinky of Mr. Gori, boss of the Hyakkikai, cut off. Mr. Gori collects debts but is unable to repay all of the stolen money to Kurogane. When two Hyakkikai prostitutes drug Ryuji and Kyotaro and try to take their remaining money, the two men seek compensation by entering the Hyakkikai office and beating up Mr. Gori, Tetsu, and the other members of the Hyakkikai.

Kurogane's daughter Yukari has had a child with a black man named George and insists on staying with him despite her father's wishes so he orders his underboss Takakura to kill George. Takakura tells the businessman Mr. Fukuda to collect a large debt from Yukichi Sugiyama in Ginza and Mr. Fukuda hires Ryuji and Kyotaro to do it. When Kyotaro calls his office, Mr. Makimura's daughter Mary answers. Kyotaro sends roses to her at work, where she fends off advances from her section chief Mr. Sugiyama.

Mr. Yabe connects Ryuji and Kyotaro to Mr. Makimura and tells Takakura that he suspects that they committed the robbery. Mr. Gori catches Kyotaro and beats him for the robbery but Kyotaro overpowers him and kills him and his henchman. He then encounters a man at a diner that is closing and goes with him to drink at the grave of his brother who was murdered by a rival gang, where the man explains that he is Kurogane's enforcer Muto.

Sugiyama is smuggling drugs during his trips abroad so Mary and Ryuji switch his bag with a different one and bring the drugs to Mr. Fukuda to pay off the debt. Mr. Yabe determines that "Kyotaro the Annihilator" is the man who killed Muto's brother so Takakura kidnaps Sugiyama and Mary to lure him in, then Kurogane tells Kyotaro to kill George to wipe the slate clean.

Instead, Kyotaro helps George escape with Yukari, then kills Muto and escapes with Ryuji and the two former Hyakkikai prostitutes.

== Cast ==
Actor	Role
Riki Takeuchi	Kyōtarō
Kōyō Maeda	Ryuji
Kenji Imai	Kurogane clan boss
Hiroshi Katsuno	
Mai Kitajima	
Hitoe Ohtake	
