= Yoko Yamaguchi =

Japanese writer

Yoko Yamaguchi (山口 洋子, Yamaguchi Yōko; May 10, 1937 – September 6, 2014) was a Japanese lyricist and novelist. In 1985, Yamaguchi won the Naoki Prize for her novels, Enka no Mushi ("Japanese Ballad Lover") and Robai ("Old Japanese Plum").

== Life and career ==
Yamaguchi was born in Nagoya as the illegitimate child of a wealthy restaurant owner and a waitress. She dropped out of high school at 16 and opened a coffee shop named "Yoko" with backing by an elderly widower. Although it was successful, she quit after about three years. In 1957, Yamaguchi passed Toei's 4th New Face competition of 1,000 people, becoming an actress. However, she only ever had small parts, and quit acting after two years.

When she was 20 years old, Yamaguchi met then-yakuza boss Noboru Ando. She became his mistress, known to members of his crime family, the Ando-gumi (ja:安藤組), as "Hime" ("princess"). When Ando was on the run from the police in 1958 for having a hitman shoot businessman Hideki Yokoi, Yamaguchi hid him in her apartment in Yoyogi.

On August 5, 1959, she opened an upscale bar in the Ginza district of Tokyo, which she named "Hime". Yamaguchi wrote song lyrics during the slow times while managing her bar, leading to a series of successful songs during the 1970s. In 1971, Yamaguchi's song "Yokohama Tasogare" ("Yokohama Twilight Time"), performed by Hiroshi Itsuki, became a major hit within the enka genre. Yamaguchi penned another hit with "Brandy Glass", performed by actor and singer, Yujiro Ishihara. She began writing novels during the 1980s.

Yamaguchi died from respiratory failure on September 6, 2014, at the age of 77.
