= Sympathy for the Underdog =

- Theatrical release poster
- Directed by: Kinji Fukasaku
- Written by: Kinji Fukasaku; Fumio Konami; Hirō Matsuda
- Produced by: Koji Shundo; Toru Yoshida
- Starring: Kōji Tsuruta; Noboru Ando
- Cinematography: Hanjiro Nakazawa
- Edited by: Osamu Tanaka
- Music by: Takeo Yamashita
- Distributed by: Toei
- Release date: January 12, 1971
- Running time: 93 minutes
- Country: Japan
- Language: Japanese

Sympathy for the Underdog, known in Japan as Bakuto Gaijin Butai (博徒外人部隊; "Outlaw Gambler-Foreign Legion"), is a 1971 Japanese yakuza film directed and co-written by Kinji Fukasaku and starring Kōji Tsuruta and Noboru Ando. It is director Fukasaku's (Battles Without Honor and Humanity, Battle Royale) last film featuring Kōji Tsuruta. Complex named it number 8 on their list of The 25 Best Yakuza Movies.

== Summary ==
The film's main character, Masuo Gunji, is an honorable old-school yakuza boss whose gang is driven out of Yokohama by a powerful rival from Tokyo known as Daito-kai. After serving ten years in prison, Gunji reunites with the few men still loyal to him and sets out to rebuild his old organization. However, after setting up a lucrative bootlegging operation in Okinawa, the yakuza family from Tokyo that was responsible for their previous downfall and Gunji's imprisonment comes to the island planning to seize control of the territory. Gunji and his men are soon forced to engage in an epic battle for their lives.

== Cast ==
- Kōji Tsuruta as Masuo Gunji
- Noboru Ando as Noburo Kudo
- Asao Koike as Ozaki
- Hideo Murota as Shark
- Harumi Sone as Gunshot
- Tsunehiko Watase as Susumu Seki
- Toru Yuri as Old Man
- Asao Uchida as Eisaku Oba
- Tadao Nakamura as Shigeru Kaizu
- Kaku Takashina as Kusakabe
- Rinishi Yamamoto as Hadelma
- Tomisaburo Wakayama as Yonabal
- Kenji Imai as Mad Dog Jiro
- Kenjiro Morokado as Gushken
- Akiko Kudo as Terumi

== Production ==
This is the ninth film in the Bakuto (Gambler) series of films that was produced by Toei Studios and starred Koji Tsuruta (except for the film Gambler Clan, which starred Ken Takakura in his place). Fukasaku had previously directed Bakuto kaisanshiki (Gambler's Farewell), the sixth film in the series.

Set and filmed in Okinawa, Sympathy for the Underdog has similarities to actual real-life events. It was not until several months after the film was released that America gave control of Okinawa back to the Japanese. But yakuza fled to the prefecture in the late 1960s in anticipation of the new business opportunities created once US forces withdrew. This ultimately led to the Yamaguchi-gumi, the largest criminal organization in the country, leading a ten-year war in Okinawa against other gangs. However, this was only just starting when the film went into production.

Inspired by movies about the French Foreign Legion, "and stories about people who cross national borders and ended up fighting in foreign wars," Fukasaku originally wanted to make a film about yakuza that end up in Vietnam, but stated that this ultimately proved "impossible." Fukusaku biographer Sadao Yamane stated that Sympathy for the Underdog was originally developed as a sequel to Japan Organized Crime Boss, a Fukasaku film from 1969 also starring Tsuruta and Ando, until the director saw The Battle of Algiers. It was then that, Yamane thinks, Fukasaku decided to make a film about "foreigners" and "resistance groups" within a yakuza film.

== Home media ==
Home Vision Entertainment released the movie on DVD in North America in 2005.

Radiance Films released the movie on Blu-ray in the United States, United Kingdom, and Canada in June 2024.
