= Yuichi Hibi =

Japanese photographer

Yuichi Hibi (born 1964, Nagoya City, Japan) is a Japanese fine art photographer currently living and working out of New York City.

== Biography ==
Prior to moving to the United States, Hibi trained as a stage and film actor as well as a filmmaker in Japan. In 1988, Hibi moved to New York City, knowing very little English, to further his acting career. For him, the city was bleak, grimy and alienating, the New York of “Taxi Driver” and “Midnight Cowboy,” gritty films he had watched as a teenager in Japan. As an import he found himself to be a natural outsider to the culture he was trying to become a part of. He began making photographs and within that work he evoked a sense of longing and isolation and understanding of things that often are overlooked. He returned to Japan in the early 1990s to find everything he once had known had changed, himself included. He continued to photograph in Japan with a similar "film noir" undertone. These New York and Japan photos were published by Nazraeli Press in a 2005 monograph titled "Imprint."

In 2008, Nazraeli Press published another monograph by Yuichi Hibi, titled "Neco." Over many years, Hibi photographed cats at rest, play, and on the hunt. Not simply documenting the cats, Hibi captures the essence of being a feline.

Hibi's photographic work has been exhibited nationally and internationally. Meanwhile, Hibi continues to seek roles in film making. In 2001, he directed a documentary on photographer Robert Frank, "A Weekend with Mr. Frank". A companion book to A Weekend with Mr. Frank was released by Nazraeli Press in fall 2006 as part of their One Picture Book series.

A documentary directed by Hibi based on the life of Ken Takakura entitled Ken San premiered at the 2016 Cannes Film Festival and was released in Japanese theaters on August 20, 2016. It featured interviews with filmmakers and actors such as Martin Scorsese, Paul Schrader, Michael Douglas, John Woo, and Yoji Yamada.

== Solo exhibitions ==
- 2013 Yuichi Hibi: Salt of the Earth, only photography, Berlin, Germany
- 2009 Yuichi Hibi: Neco, Gallery 339, Philadelphia, PA
- 2009 Yuichi Hibi: Neco, Michael Dawson Gallery, Los Angeles, CA
- 2007 Yuichi Hibi: imprint, Art Labor Gallery, Shanghai, China
- 2006 Yuichi Hibi: imprint Onishi Galley, New York, NY
- 2006 Yuichi Hibi: imprint, Michael Dawson Galley, Los Angeles, CA
- 2006 Yuihci Hibi: imprint, Gallery 339, Philadelphia, PA
- 2004 Yuichi Hibi: imprint, Staton-Greenberg Gallery, Santa Barbara, CA
- 2003 Yuichi Hibi: Zero Hour, Marvelli Gallery, New York, New York, NY
- 2001 Yuichi Hibi: imprint, Gallery Space Sushiden, New York, NY
- 2001 Yuichi Hibi: imprint, Marvelli Gallery, New York, NY

== Group exhibitions ==
- 2009 9 Years, Fifty-One Fine Arts, Antwerp, Belgium
- 2008 Accrochage, Fifty-One Fine Arts, Antwerp, Belgium
- 2008 Book Dummies, Education Galleries, ICP, New York, NY
- 2008 PARIS PHOTO, Paris, France
- 2008 Ten: Gifts of SBMA Photo Futures, Santa Barbara Museum of Art, CA
- 2007 Branching Out, SEPIA International Inc., New York, NY
- 2007 AIPAD-Miami, FL
- 2007 PHOTO-LA, Los Angeles, CA
- 2006 AIPAD-NY, New York, NY
- 2006 PHOTO-LA, Los Angeles, CA
- 2003 Faces, SEPIA International Inc., New York, NY
- 2003 The Gift Show, Staton-Greenberg Gallery, Santa Barbara, CA
- 2002 Land, Staton-Greenberg Gallery, Santa Barbara, CA
- 2002 The Armory Photography Show, New York, NY
- 2001 Dream Street, SEPIA International Inc., New York, NY
- 1993 Center for the Arts “Collectors’ Choice", St. Petersburg, FL
- 1993 Monique Goldstrom Gallery, New York, NY
