= The Homeless =

- Directed by: Kōichi Saitō
- Screenplay by: Takehiro Nakajima; Michio Sobe
- Produced by: Shintaro Katsu; Kozen Nishioka; Masanori Sanada
- Starring: Shintaro Katsu; Ken Takakura; Meiko Kaji
- Cinematography: Noritaka Sakamoto
- Music by: Hachiro Aoyama
- Production company: Katsu
- Distributed by: Toho
- Release date: 9 October 1974 (Japan)
- Country: Japan

The Homeless (無宿, Yadonashi) is a 1974 Japanese film directed by Kōichi Saitō. It was written by Takehiro Nakajima and Michio Sobe.

It is a remake of the French film The Last Adventure (1967).

== Plot ==
Two men released from prison and one man's girlfriend search for gold using a diving suit.

== Cast ==
- Ken Takakura as Jokichi Anabuki
- Shintaro Katsu as Genzo Komagata
- Meiko Kaji as Sakie
- Ichirō Nakatani as Tappei
- Hideji Otaki as Oba
- Goro Ibuki
- Shingo Yamashiro as Yasu
- Kenji Imai as Isokichi
- Taiji Tonoyama as Tamezo
- Noboru Ando as Senzo Hikawa

== Release ==
The Homeless was released theatrically in Japan on 9 October 1974 where it was distributed by Toho.
