= Hibi (surname) =

Hibi (written: 日比) is a Japanese surname. Notable people with the surname include:

- George Matsusaburo Hibi (1886–1947), Japanese-American artist
- Hibi Kimei (日比 重明, 1848–1926), Japanese politician
- Hisako Hibi (1907–1991), Japanese painter and printmaker, wife of George Matsusaburo Hibi
- Mayo Hibi (日比 万葉, born 1996), Japanese tennis player
- Yuichi Hibi (日比 遊一, born 1964), Japanese photographer
