= Circuit no Ōkami =

Japanese manga series by Satoshi Ikezawa

- Cover of the first volume

サーキットの狼 (Sākitto no Ōkami)
- Manga
- Written by: Satoshi Ikezawa
- Published by: Shueisha
- Magazine: Weekly Shōnen Jump
- Original run: December 24, 1974 – July 24, 1979
- Volumes: 27
- Live-action film
- Directed by: Kazuhiko Yamaguchi
- Released: August 6, 1977
- Manga

Circuit no Ōkami II: Modena no Tsurugi
- Written by: Satoshi Ikezawa
- Published by: Shueisha
- Magazine: Weekly Playboy
- Original run: 1989 – 1995
- Volumes: 25
- Original video animation

Circuit no Ōkami: Modena no Tsurugi
- Directed by: Yoshihide Kuriyama
- Studio: Gainax
- Released: December 21, 1990
- Runtime: 45 minutes

Circuit no Ōkami (Japanese: サーキットの狼, Hepburn: Sākitto no Ōkami) is a Japanese manga series written and illustrated by Satoshi Ikezawa. It was serialized in Weekly Shōnen Jump from the January 1975 to June 1979 issues.

The live action film of Circuit no Ōkami, directed by Kazuhiko Yamaguchi, was released in Japan on August 6, 1977.

The sequel to Circuit no Ōkami, Circuit no Ōkami II: Modena no Tsurugi (サーキットの狼II―モデナの剣), was also published by Shueisha.

Circuit no Ōkami II was adapted into an OVA, released December 21, 1990.

== Manga ==
=== Second edition ===
==== Circuit no Ōkami ====
No.	Release date	ISBN
1	August, 1996	978-4-944-01780-5
2	September, 1996	978-4-944-01781-2
3	October, 1996	978-4-944-01783-6
4	November, 1996	978-4-944-01784-3
5	December, 1996	978-4-944-01785-0
6	January, 1997	978-4-944-01786-7
7	February, 1997	978-4-944-01787-4
8	March, 1997	978-4-944-01788-1
9	April, 1997	978-4-944-01789-8
10	May, 1997	978-4-944-01790-4
11	June, 1997	978-4-944-01791-1
12	July, 1997	978-4-944-01792-8
13	August, 1997	978-4-944-01793-5
14	September, 1997	978-4-944-01794-2
15	October, 1997	978-4-944-01795-9
16	November, 1997	978-4-944-01796-6
17	December, 1997	978-4-944-01797-3
18	January, 1998	978-4-944-01798-0
19	February, 1998	978-4-944-01799-7

==== Circuit no Ōkami II: Modena no Tsurugi ====
No.	Release date	ISBN
20	March, 1998	978-4-944-01740-9
21	April, 1998	978-4-944-01741-6
22	May, 1998	978-4-944-01742-3
23	June, 1998	978-4-944-01743-0
24	July, 1998	978-4-944-01744-7
25	August, 1998	978-4-944-01745-4
26	September, 1998	978-4-944-01746-1
27	October, 1998	978-4-944-01747-8
28	November, 1998	978-4-944-01748-5
29	December, 1998	978-4-944-01749-2
30	January, 1999	978-4-944-01750-8
31	February, 1999	978-4-944-01731-7
32	March, 1999	978-4-944-01732-4
33	April, 1999	978-4-944-01733-1
34	May, 1999	978-4-944-01734-8
35	June, 1999	978-4-944-01750-8
36	July, 1999	978-4-944-01735-5
37	August, 1999	978-4-944-01737-9
38	September, 1999	978-4-944-01738-6
39	October, 1999	978-4-944-01739-3
40	November, 1999	978-4-944-01782-9
