= Katri, Girl of the Meadows =

Japanese anime television series

- DVD cover art of the Katri, Girl of the Meadows re-edited footage film.
- 牧場の少女カトリ
- Genre: Drama
- Based on: Paimen, piika ja emäntä by Auni Nuolivaara
- Screenplay by: Akira Miyazaki
- Directed by: Hiroshi Saitō
- Music by: Tōru Fuyuki
- Opening theme: "Love with You 〜 ai no purezento 〜" by Chie Kobayashi
- Ending theme: " Kaze no komori uta" by Chie Kobayashi
- Country of origin: Japan
- Original language: Japanese
- No. of episodes: 49 (list of episodes)

Production
- Executive producer: Kōichi Motohashi
- Producer: Takaji Matsudo
- Production companies: Nippon Animation; Fuji Television

Original release
- Network: FNS (Fuji TV)
- Release: January 8 – December 23, 1984

Katri, Girl of the Meadows (牧場の少女カトリ, Makiba no Shōjo Katori) is an anime series based on the Finnish novel Paimen, piika ja emäntä (Shepherdess, Servant Girl and Hostess) by Auni Nuolivaara. The series was broadcast originally in Japan in 1984 as part of the children's anthology series World Masterpiece Theater, also known simply as "Meisaku" from Nippon Animation. The anthology had before and after produced a great variety of animated series based on different children's novels from around the world; among them were My Annette: Story of the Alps (1983) and Little Princess Sara (1985). In Europe, where World Masterpiece Theater series have found huge success, Katri, Girl of the Meadows made its way to different countries, including Spain, Italy, France, Netherlands, Germany, Iran and the Arabic-speaking world. Although it takes place there, the series has never been published or broadcast in Finland, and few Finns have ever heard of it.

The first and last episodes were broadcast English dubbed in the UK on Channel 4 as Little Girl on the Farm and Little Girl goes to School as part of 1987's Japanese Autumn season.

== Plot ==
Set in Finland, the plot starts in 1911 when little Katri's mother leaves for Germany to work, leaving her daughter with her grandparents. At the beginning of the First World War in 1914, with Finland still under Russian rule, the inhabitants of these lands have had little or no news from the outside, and no one knows if Katri will see her mother again, whose money meanwhile stops arriving to the family. To make matters worse, things on Katri's grandparents' farm are not going well; the harvest had been a small one, their only cow had been killed by a bear and the family faces great monetary problems.

Katri wants to help and, against her grandparents' will, she finds work in a neighboring farm; for a girl of hardly nine years of age farm work is hard and tiring even with all of her enthusiasm and good moods, which is what keeps her standing. While working on the farm, the little girl learns about Kalevala from old Gunilla and learns to read and write thanks to her.

Later, Katri works as a nanny for a wealthy child, whose mother will send her to school in Turku. Katri has great success in her studies, thanks to Gunilla's help. The child will also know how the Russian Revolution and the war will lead to independence of Finland from Russia. At the end of the war, Katri's mother comes back to find her daughter. Katri, once adult, will write children's stories.

== Cast ==
- Hitomi Oikawa as Katri Ukonniemi
- Toru Furuya as Martti
- Yuko Tsuga as Mari (Martti's sister)
- Yuko Kobayashi as Helena (Martti's cousin)
- Yoshiko Matsuo as Miina (Helena's mother)
- Mahito Tsujimura as Väinö Harma
- Asami Mukaidono as Milole (Harma's maid)
- Kumiko Takizawa as Lotta Kuusela
- Hisashi Katsuta as Elias Lilack (Lotta's father)

== Episodes ==
No.	Title	Original release date
1	"Goodbyes"; Transliteration: "Wakare" (Japanese: 別れ)	8 January 1984
2	"Friends"; Transliteration: "Tomodachi" (Japanese: 友だち)	15 January 1984
3	"Spring Storm"; Transliteration: "Haru no arashi" (Japanese: 春のあらし)	22 January 1984
4	"Decision"; Transliteration: "Ketsui" (Japanese: 決意)	29 January 1984
5	"Time of Separation"; Transliteration: "Shuppatsu" (Japanese: 出発)	5 February 1984
6	"The Master"; Transliteration: "Shujin" (Japanese: 主人)	12 February 1984
7	"The Madam"; Transliteration: "Okusama" (Japanese: 奥様)	19 February 1984
8	"The Accident"; Transliteration: "Sainan" (Japanese: 災難)	26 February 1984
9	"Affection"; Transliteration: "Aijō" (Japanese: 愛情)	4 March 1984
10	"The Promise"; Transliteration: "Yakusoku" (Japanese: 約束)	11 March 1984
11	"The Fight"; Transliteration: "Kenka" (Japanese: 喧嘩)	18 March 1984
12	"The Letter"; Transliteration: "Tegami" (Japanese: 手紙)	25 March 1984
13	"A Wonderful Present"; Transliteration: "Sutekina Okurimono" (Japanese: 素敵な贈物)	1 April 1984
14	"My First Invitation"; Transliteration: "Hajimete no Shōtai" (Japanese: はじめての招待)	8 April 1984
15	"An Unexpected Payment"; Transliteration: "Omoigakenai Okyūryō" (Japanese: おもいがけないお給料)	15 April 1984
16	"The Little Lost Lamb"; Transliteration: "Maigo ni Natta Hitsuji" (Japanese: 迷子になった羊)	22 April 1984
17	"Day of the extermination of wolves" Transliteration: "Ookami wo Taijisuru Hi" (Japanese: 狼を退治する日)	29 April 1984
18	"Two Fires"; Transliteration: "Futatsu no Kaji" (Japanese: 二つの火事)	6 May 1984
19	"Room Mate"; Transliteration: "Tonaridoushi" (Japanese: 隣どうし)	13 May 1984
20	"Incoming person, outgoing person" Transliteration: "Kita Hito to Saru Hito" (Japanese: 来た人と去る人)	20 May 1984
21	"Abel targeted" Transliteration: "Aberu ga Nerawareta" (Japanese: アベルが狙われた)	27 May 1984
22	"While waiting for spring" Transliteration: "Haru wo Machinagara" (Japanese: 春を待ちながら)	3 June 1984
23	"The bear and the cattle, which one is stronger" Transliteration: "Kuma to Ushi wa dochira ga Tsuyoi ka" (Japanese: 熊と牛はどちらが強いか)	17 June 1984
24	"A meeting and a parting" Transliteration: "Deai to Wakare" (Japanese: 出会いと別れ)	24 June 1984
25	"Event at the Island"; Transliteration: "Shima de no Dekigoto" (Japanese: 島での出来事)	1 July 1984
26	"The person who saved us" Transliteration: "Tasuketekureta Hito" (Japanese: 助けてくれた人)	8 July 1984
27	"Growing City"; Transliteration: "Tokai Sodachi" (Japanese: 都会育ち)	15 July 1984
28	"New Life"; Transliteration: "Atarashii Seikatsu" (Japanese: 新しい生活)	21 July 1984
29	"Seeing dreams" Transliteration: "Yume wo Mite ita" (Japanese: 夢を見ていた)	28 July 1984
30	"Like a majestic swan" Transliteration: "Utsukushii Hakuchō no You ni" (Japanese: 美しい白鳥のように)	12 August 1984
31	"Book delivered by mail" Transliteration: "Hon ga Okurarete Kita" (Japanese: 本が送られて来た)	19 August 1984
32	"Magical book and the devil" Transliteration: "Mahō no Hon to Akuma" (Japanese: 魔法の本と悪魔)	26 August 1984
33	"Joy and sadness" Transliteration: "Yorokobi to Kanashimi" (Japanese: 喜びと悲しみ)	2 September 1984
34	"Going to Helsinki"; Transliteration: "Herushinki Yuki" (Japanese: ヘルシンキ行き)	9 September 1984
35	"Father and Daughter"; Transliteration: "Chichi to Musume" (Japanese: 父と娘)	16 September 1984
36	"The Big Decision"; Transliteration: "Okusama no Ketsui" (Japanese: 奥様の決意)	23 September 1984
37	"Abel Astray"; Transliteration: "Maigo no Aberu" (Japanese: 迷子のアベル)	30 September 1984
38	"Every Road"; Transliteration: "Sorezore no Michi" (Japanese: それぞれの道)	7 October 1984
39	"Party at Harma's mansion" Transliteration: "Haruma Yashiki no Pāti" (Japanese: ハルマ屋敷のパーティ)	14 October 1984
40	"On the road" Transliteration: "Michizure" (Japanese: 道づれ)	21 October 1984
41	"Citizens of Turku"; Transliteration: "Turuku no Hitobito" (Japanese: トゥルクの人々)	28 October 1984
42	"Picture-book without pictures" Transliteration: "E no nai Ehon" (Japanese: 絵のない絵本)	4 November 1984
43	"Road a car!" Transliteration: "Jidōsha ni Notta!" (Japanese: 自動車に乗った!)	11 November 1984
44	"Obnoxious Girl"; Transliteration: "Nikurashii Musume" (Japanese: にくらしい娘)	18 November 1984
45	"Tiresome day" Transliteration: "Tsukareta Ichinichi" (Japanese: 疲れた一日)	25 November 1984
46	"Beautiful thing" Transliteration: "Utsukushii Mono" (Japanese: 美しいもの)	2 December 1984
47	"Souvenir bag" Transliteration: "Omiyage no Randoseru" (Japanese: お土産のランドセル)	9 December 1984
48	"Ah! School Entrance"; Transliteration: "Aa Nyūgaku" (Japanese: ああ入学)	16 December 1984
49	"Mother's return" Transliteration: "Okaasan no Kikoku" (Japanese: おかあさんの帰国)	23 December 1984
