= Auni Nuolivaara =

Finnish writer

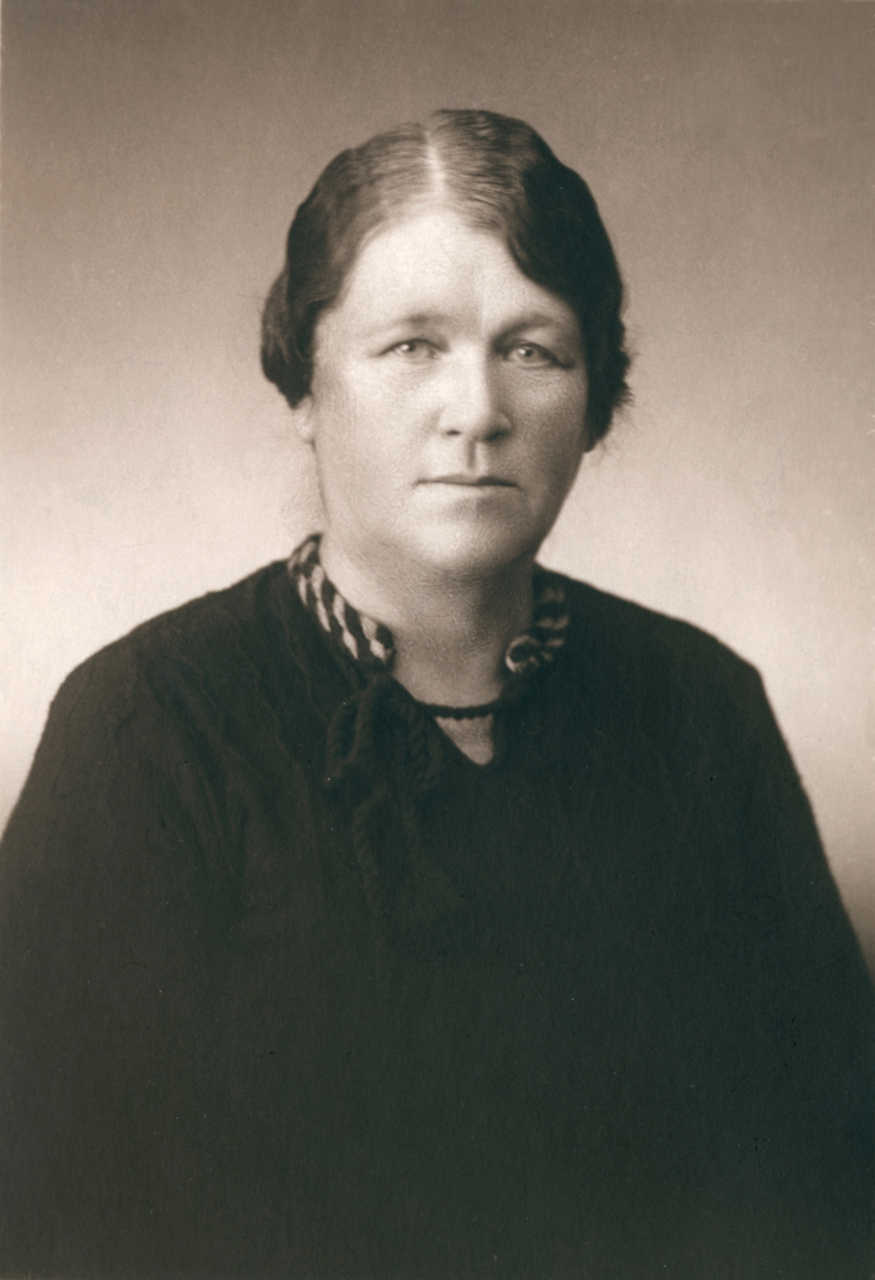
- Born: Auni Elisabet Lagus; 22 May 1883; Korpilahti, Grand Duchy of Finland
- Died: 26 October 1972 (aged 89); Tampere, Finland
- Occupations: Writer, teacher, artist
- Notable work: Paimen, piika ja emäntä (1936)
- Spouse: Armas Nuolivaara (m. 1909, d. 1951)

Auni Elisabet Nuolivaara (née Lagus, later Hirvensalo; (Note: Born Lagus, but the family name was later Finnicised to Hirvensalo; Nuolivaara was her married name.) 22 May 1883 — 26 October 1972) was a Finnish writer and artist.

== Personal life ==
Auni Hirvensalo was born to Selim Hirvensalo (né Lagus) and Lydia née Dahlström. Her younger brother was the translator and dictionarist Lauri Hirvensalo (1892-1965).

She was married to the linguist and educator Armas Nuolivaara, PhD.

== Career ==
=== Teacher ===
Nuolivaara qualified as a teacher in 1905, and worked at primary, secondary, and folk high school levels as a teacher of music, French, and other subjects, as well as head teacher, on and off for the next 20 years.

=== Artist ===
She was a keen amateur artist, making several study trips around Europe, as well as learning drawing and painting at the Accademia di Belle Arti di Roma in Italy, until the outbreak of World War I disrupted her travels.

=== Writer ===
Nuolivaara is most notable as a writer, best remembered for her novel Paimen, piika ja emäntä (lit. 'The Shepherd, Maid and Mistress'), which won the 1936 Otava book award, was translated into several languages, and made into a 1938 film by the same name. (Note: Although the film was named after the book, it was actually mostly based on the book's sequel, Isäntä ja Emäntä.) She later wrote a sequel, Paimen, piika ja emäntä — II.

The 1984 Japanese anime series Katri, Girl of the Meadows (牧場の少女カトリ, Makiba no Shōjo Katori) is based on Paimen, piika ja emäntä.

Her other notable works include the novels Sinä olet se mies...! (1927), Isäntä ja emäntä (1937; the third and final part of the Paimen, piika ja emäntä trilogy), Kiitollisuuden yrtti (1940), and Syy oli minun (1952). Nuolivaara's published works comprise more than a dozen novels, a play, a radio drama and a children's book.
