= Wandering Ginza Butterfly =

- Poster
- Directed by: Kazuhiko Yamaguchi
- Written by: Kazuhiko Yamaguchi; Isao Matsumoto
- Starring: Meiko Kaji
- Music by: Toshiaki Tsushima
- Distributed by: Toei
- Release dates: 1972 (Japan); 2009 (U.S.)
- Running time: 86 minutes
- Country: Japan
- Language: Japanese

Wandering Ginza Butterfly (Japanese: 銀蝶渡り鳥, Hepburn: Gincho Wataridori) is a 1972 Japanese yakuza film directed by Kazuhiko Yamaguchi, and co-written with Isao Matsumoto. The movie stars Meiko Kaji and Tsunehiko Watase. The movie was followed with a 1972 sequel entitled Wandering Ginza Butterfly 2: She-Cat Gambler.

== Plot ==
Nami, a Bōsōzoku leader, kills a high-ranking member of a yakuza organization, due to a turf war and is sent to prison. After serving three years, she finds a home living with her uncle at a pool hall. After meeting a pimp named Ryuji, she acquires a job as a hostess in Ginza, where she soon becomes very popular. However, her criminal past is not easily left behind. Further complicating matters is a local yakuza named Owada, who attempts to take control of the bar and kills Ryuji's sworn brother. Defending her uncle's business and seeking revenge, Nami goes after Owada.

== Cast ==
- Meiko Kaji as Higuchi Nami
- Tsunehiko Watase as Higashi Ryuji
- Akiko Koyama as Kayo
- Yayoi Watanabe as Hiroko
- Koji Nanbara as Owada
- Toru Yuri as Yousan
- Hiroshi Itsuki as Himself
- Tatsuo Umemiya as Matsudaira Shinnosuke
