= Kenji Imai (actor) =

Japanese actor (born 1932)

- Born: 31 March 1932; Kanagawa Prefecture, Japan
- Occupation: Actor
- Years active: 1955-

Kenji Imai (今井健二, Imai Kenji; 31 March 1932) is a Japanese actor. He is most noted for playing villains and appeared in many jidaigeki and detective television dramas as a guest. After graduating from Meiji University, he signed a contract with Toei Company. He made his film debut with Yarodomo Omotee Dero. His hobby is fishing , and in 1983 he wrote an introductory book on fishing, "The Book That Makes Fish Bite on Their Own Will" (Shodensha Non-Book), which received a recommendation from Takakura Ken.

== Filmography ==
=== Films ===
- Yarodomo Omotee Dero (1956)
- Taking The Castle (1965)
- Zoku Soshiki Bōryoku (1967)
- Outlaw:Kill! (1968)
- Shinjuku outlaw: Step On the Gas (1970)
- Sympathy for the Underdog (1971)
- Kantō Exile (1971)
- Outlaw Killers: Three Mad Dog Brothers (1972)
- Terrifying Girls' High School: Lynch Law Classroom (1973)
- Girl Boss: Escape From Reform School (1973)
- The Last Samurai (1974)
- The Homeless (1974)
- Champion of Death (1975)
- Graveyard of Honor (1975)
- Gambling Den Heist (1975)
- Yakuza Graveyard (1976)
- The Resurrection of the Golden Wolf (1979)
- Peanuts (1996)

=== Television drama ===
- Daichūshingura (1971) as Maebara
- Gunbei Meyasubako (1971) as Saito
- Hissatsu Shiokinin (1972) guest star in episode 11
- Taiyō ni Hoero! (1973~1984) guest star in episodes 37, 96, 110, 529, and 599
- Tasukenin Hashiru (1974) guest star in episode 20
- G-Men '75 (1975) guest star in episode 10
- Nagasaki Hangachōu (1975) guest star in episode 14
- Tsūkai! Kōchiyama Sōshun (1975) guest star in episode 12
- Hissatsu Shiokiya Kagyō (1975) guest star in episode 4
- Daitokai Tatakaino Hibi (1976) guest star in episode 10 and 30
- Shin Hissatsu Shiokinin (1977) guest star in episodes 3, 21, and 31
- Hissatsu Karakurinin Fugakuhiyakkei Koroshitabi (1978) guest star in episode 7
- Seibu Keisatsu (1979–82) guest star in episode 2, 17, 67 and 121
- Tantei Monogatari (1980) guest star in episode 6 and 24
