= Kazuhiko Yamaguchi =

Japanese film director (1937–2026)

- Born: 5 February 1937; Nagano Prefecture, Japan
- Died: 6 October 2026 (aged 89); Yokohama, Japan
- Occupation: Film director

Kazuhiko Yamaguchi (山口和彦, Yamaguchi Kazuhiko; 5 February 1937 – 6 October 2026) was a Japanese film director.

== Life and career ==
Born in Nagano Prefecture, Yamaguchi graduated from Waseda University and began working at the Tōei studios in Kyoto. He directed a number of action films series in the 1970s and also helmed many Television films.

Yamaguchi died from pneumonia on 6 October 2026, at the age of 89.

== Filmography ==
- Delinquent Girl Boss: Blossoming Night Dreams (1970)
- Wandering Ginza Butterfly (1972)
- Gincho Nagaremono: Mesuneko Bakuchi (1972)
- Sister Street Fighter (1974)
- Sister Street Fighter: Hanging by a Thread (1974)
- A Haunted Turkish Bathhouse (1975)
- The Return of the Sister Street Fighter (1975)
- Champion of Death (1975)
- Karate Bearfighter (1975)
- Wolf Guy: Burning Wolf Man (ウルフガイ 燃えろ狼男, Urufugai moeru rōdan) (1975)
- G-Men '75 (1975-82) television series
- Karate Warriors (1976)
- Circuit no Ōkami (1977)
- Karate for Life (1977)
- School Wars: Hero (1984) television series
