= Ken Takakura =

Japanese actor (1931–2014)

Ken Takakura Junior Third Rank
- 高倉 健
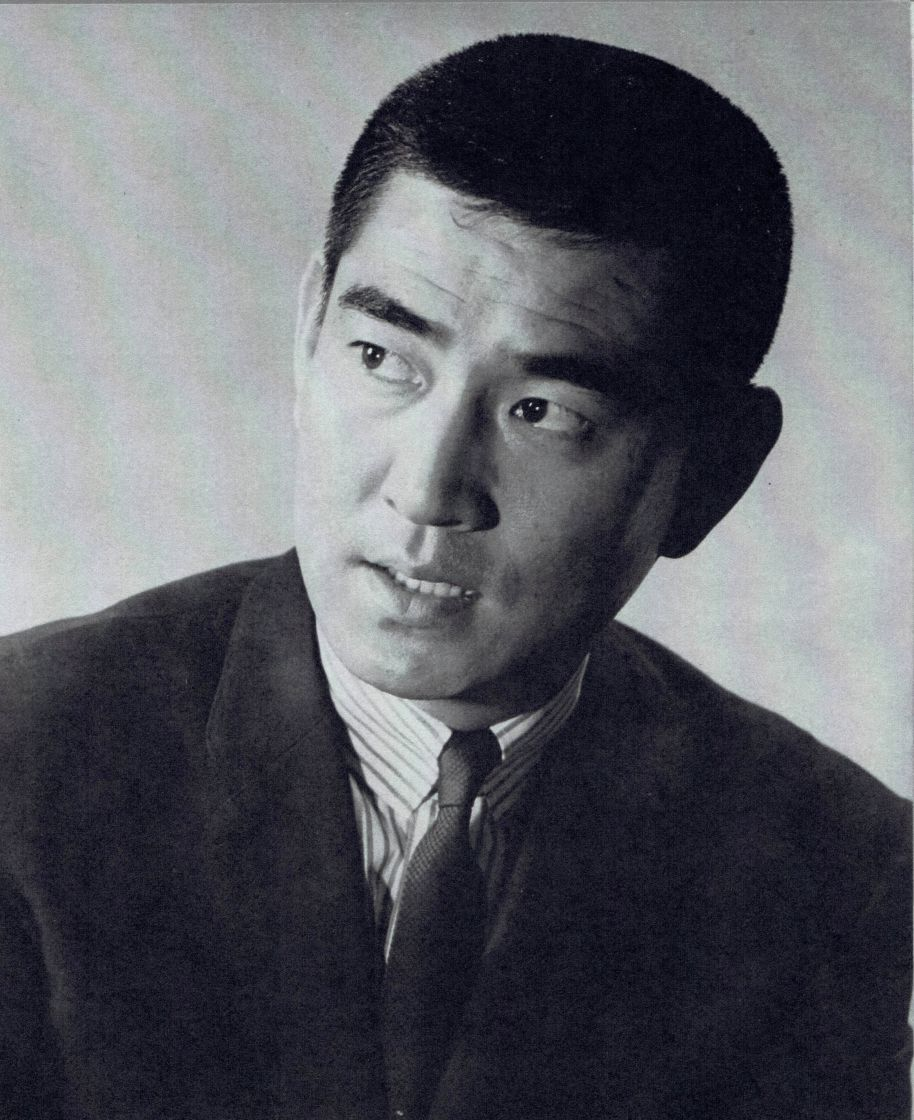
- Takakura in 1966
- Born: Takeichi Oda (小田 剛一, Oda Takeichi); February 16, 1931; Nakama, Fukuoka, Japan
- Died: November 10, 2014 (aged 83); Tokyo, Japan
- Education: Meiji University
- Occupation: Actor
- Years active: 1956–2014
- Spouses: Chiemi Eri (m. 1959; div. 1971): Taka Oda (Common-law marriage 1997-2014 until death, daughter in law from 2013)

Ken Takakura (Japanese: 高倉 健, Hepburn: Takakura Ken; February 16, 1931 – November 10, 2014) was a Japanese actor and singer who appeared in over 200 films. Affectionately referred to as "Ken-san" by audiences, he was best known for his brooding style and the stoic presence he brought to his roles. He won the Japan Academy Prize for Outstanding Performance by an Actor in a Leading Role four times, tied with Koji Yakusho for the most ever. Takakura additionally received the Japanese Medal of Honor with purple ribbon in 1998, the Person of Cultural Merit award in 2006, and the Order of Culture in 2013.

== Early life ==
Takakura was born in Nakama, Fukuoka in 1931. He was the second of four siblings, two of whom were sons and two of whom were daughters. His father, Toshiro Oda, was a former Imperial Japanese Navy officer, serving on the battleship Hiei during World War II, and mother, Takano was a teacher. As child he suffered from disease, encouraged by his father, Tadahi joined sports when he attended Tochiku High School in nearby Yahata City, where he was a member of the boxing team and English society. It was around this time that he gained his streetwise swagger and tough-guy persona watching yakuza movies. This subject was covered in one of his most famous movies, Showa Zankyo-den (Remnants of Chivalry in the Showa Era), in which he played an honorable old-school yakuza among the violent post-war gangs. After graduating from Meiji University in Tokyo, Takakura attended an audition on impulse in 1955 at the Toei Film Company while applying for a managerial position.

== Career ==
Toei found a natural in Takakura as he debuted with Denko Karate Uchi in 1956. In 1959 he married singer Chiemi Eri, but divorced in 1971. His breakout role would be in the 1965 film Abashiri Prison, and its sequel Another Abashiri Prison Story (also 1965), in which he played an ex-con antihero. By the time Takakura left Toei in 1976, he had appeared in over 180 films.

He gained international recognition after starring in the 1970 war film Too Late the Hero as the cunning Imperial Japanese Major Yamaguchi, the 1974 Sydney Pollack sleeper hit The Yakuza with Robert Mitchum, and is probably best known in the West for his role in Ridley Scott's Black Rain (1989). He again appeared to Western audiences with the 1992 Fred Schepisi comedy Mr. Baseball starring Tom Selleck.

Takakura was one of the few Japanese actors who experienced popularity in China, due to his appearance in Junya Sato's 1976 crime drama Manhunt, which was the first foreign film shown in the country after the Cultural Revolution. He also starred as the titular assassin in Sato's Golgo 13 (1973), a Japanese–Iranian production and the first live-action adaptation of the long-running Japanese manga series Golgo 13.

He appeared in three films since 2000: Hotaru (ホタル; "The Firefly") in May 2001, Riding Alone for Thousands of Miles, by Chinese director Zhang Yimou, in late December 2005, and Yasuo Furuhata's Anata e in late August 2012, after a six-year hiatus. He died of lymphoma on November 10, 2014. Shintaro Ishihara described him as "the last big star (in Japan)." A huge number of Chinese internet users expressed their sympathies and condolences, including many celebrities in the Chinese movie industry. The spokesman of China's Ministry of Foreign Affairs Hong Lei said that Takakura made significant contributions to the cultural exchange between China and Japan.

A documentary based on Takakura's life entitled Ken San premiered at the 2016 Cannes Film Festival and was released in Japanese theaters on August 20, 2016. It was directed by photographer Yuichi Hibi and features interviews with filmmakers and actors such as Martin Scorsese, Paul Schrader, Michael Douglas, John Woo, and Yoji Yamada.

== Filmography ==
Year	Title	Role	Notes	Ref.
	Inner Journey	Yusaku Shinobu	Lead role	
1956	Inner Journey Pt.2	Yusaku Shinobu	Lead role	
1956	The Chop Professor			
1956	Nippon G-Men Pt.3			
1956	Yūhi to Kenjū	Shintarō Yamaoka		
1956	Mother Peacock			
1956	Get Rid of the Gun		Lead role	
1957	Daigaku no Ishimatsu		Lead role	
1957	Tajobushin			
1957	Nisshin senso fuun hiwa: Kiri no machi			
1957	Aoi unabara	Kenji Hamada		
1957	Jet Air Base 101	Jiro Nakata		
1958	No Advice Taken			
1958	Tarao Bannai: Jusan no mao			
1958	Romance, Freestyle			
1958	Kisetsufu no kanatani	Hideo Sekigawa		
1958	Hell's Companion	Mikio Ikari		
1958	Detective Duel			
1958	With Songs in My Heart			
1958	Festival of Forest And Lake	Ichitaro Kazamori	Lead role	
1958	Sister within Sister	Hiroshi Ishioka		
1958	Guns of Purgatory			
1959	Tornado Family	Goro Tamura		
1959	Men in a Rough Town			
1959	Black Finger	Shinkichi Mita	Lead role	
1959	Four Hours of Terror		Lead role	
1959	The Road That Beasts Take		Lead role	
1959	Hyoryū shitaî			
1960	Zoku beran me-e geisha			
1960	Ōinaru tabiji	Kozo's Second Son		
1960	Zubekō tenshi			
1960	Tenka no Kaidanji Tosshin Tarō	Tarō Tosshin	Lead role	
1960	Zoku zoku beran me-e geisha			
1960	Otoko nara yattemiro		Lead role	
1960	Sabaku o wataru taiyo			
1960	Ōzora no muhōmono		Lead role	
1960	The Second Bullet Is Marked			
1961	Tenka no Kaidanji Senpū Tarō	Tarô Senpū	Lead role	
1961	Hana to arashi to gyangu			
1961	Hibari minyo no tabi beran me e geisha Sado heiku			
1961	Mannen Tarô to anego shain	Tarô Mannen	Lead role	
1961	Beranme Chunori-san			
1961	Akuma no temari-uta	Kindaichi Kōsuke	Lead role	
1961	Saigo no kaoyaku			
1961	Kashi no onna Ishimatsu			
1961	Boku wa jigoku no tehinshi da			
1961	Beran me-e geisha makari tōru			
1962	Minami taiheiyō nami takashi			
1962	Beran me-e geisha to Osaka musume			
1962	Ni-nirokushiken Daisshutsu			
1962	Koi to Taiyo to Gang		Lead role	
1962	Komon shacho manyuki			
1962	Minyo no tabi: Sakurajima Otemoyan			
1962	Sanbyakurokujugoya			
1962	Ankoku-gai saigo no hi			
1962	Tokyo Untouchable	Yoshio Harada	Lead role	
1962	Yumin-gai no Judan			
1962	Uragiri mono wa jigoku daze			
1962	Sen-hime to Hideyori	Naomori		
1963	Ankokugai no kaoyaku: juichinin no gyangu	Sawagami		
1963	Tokyo Untouchable: Prison Breakers	Yoshio Harada		
1963	Ankokugai saidai no kettô	Shimpei Matsuoka		
1963	Miyamoto Musashi: Nitôryû kaigen	Sasaki Kojirō		
1963	Gyangu Chûshingura	Takumi Asano		
1963	Kyôkatsu	Teruo Yabuki	Lead role	
1963	Theater of Life: Hishakaku	Miyagawa		
1963	Overthrow the Boss	Yoshioka	Lead role	
1963	Violent Quarter	Shunsuke	Lead role	
1964	Tōkyō gyangu tai Honkon gyangu			
1964	Miyamoto Musashi: Ichijôji no kettô	Sasaki Kojirō		
1964	Jakoman and Tetsu	Tetsu	Lead role	
1964	Narazumono	Minami	Lead role	
1964	Irezumi totsugekitai			
1964	Ankokugai Main Street	Tetsuya Shinobu	Lead role	
1964	Nihon kyôkaku-den	Chokichi	Lead role	
1964	Wolves, Pigs and Men	Jirō		
1965	Kaoyaku	Kyōichi Hayami		
1965	A Fugitive from the Past	Detective Ajimura		
1965	Nihon Kyokaku-den: naniwa-hen		Lead role	
1965	Abashiri Prison	Shinichi Tachibana	Lead role	
1965	Another Abashiri Prison Story	Shinichi Tachibana	Lead role	
1965	Nihon Kyokaku-den: kanto-hen			
1965	Miyamoto Musashi: Ganryū-jima no kettô	Sasaki Kojirō		
1965	Shōwa zankyō-den	Seiji Terajima	Lead role	
1965	Abashiri Prison: Saga of Homesickness	Shinichi Tachibana	Lead role	
1965	Abashiri Bangaichi: Hokkai-hen	Shinichi Tachibana	Lead role	
1966	Shōwa zankyō-den: Karajishi botan		Lead role	
1966	Nihon Kyokaku-den: Ketto Kanda-matsuri	Shinsan	Lead role	
1966	Kamikaze Man: Duel at Noon	Fumio Kuroki		
1966	Otoko no shōbu	Kotaro Senju		
1966	Nihon Kyokaku-den: Kaminari-mon no Ketto	Shintaro Hiramatsu	Lead role	
1966	Jigoku no okite ni asu wa nai	Ichiro Takita	Lead role	
1966	Showa zankyo-den: Ippiki okami		Lead role	
1966	Abashiri Bangaichi: Kōya no Taiketsu	Shinichi Tachibana	Lead role	
1966	Abashiri Bangaichi: Nangoku no Taiketsu	Shinichi Tachibana	Lead role	
1966	Abashiri Bangaichi: Dai Setsugen no Taiketsu	Shinichi Tachibana		
1967	Abashiri Bangaichi: Kettō Reika 30-do	Shinichi Tachibana	Lead role	
1967	Shōwa zankyō-den: Chizome no karajishi	Hidejirô Hanada	Lead role	
1967	Abashiri Bangaichi: Aku e no Chōsen	Shinichi Tachibana	Lead role	
1967	Abashiri Bangaichi: Fubuki no Tōsō	Shinichi Tachibana	Lead role	
1967	Nihon Kyokaku-den: Shira-ha no Sakazuki		Lead role	
1967	Nihon kyokaku-den: kirikomi		Lead role	
1967	Kyokotsu ichidai			
1967	Kyokakū no okitê		Special appearance	
1967	Âa dōki no sakura	First Lieutenant Kenmochi		
1968	Nihon Kyokaku-den: Zetsuenjō		Lead role	
1968	The Drifting Avenger	Ken Kato	Lead role	
1968	Red Peony Gambler	Shogo Hanaoka		
1968	Gorotsuki		Lead role	
1968	Jinsei-gekijō: Hishakaku to kiratsune	Miyagawa		
1968	Gion matsuri			
1968	Bakuto retsuden		Lead role	
1968	Shin Abashiri Bangaichi	Katsuji Suematsu	Lead role	
1968	Kyokaku Retsuden			
1968	Gokuchu no kaoyaku			
1969	Hibotan bakuto: Hanafuda shōbu	Shogo Hanaoka		
1969	Shōwa zankyō-den: Karajishi jingi		Lead role	
1969	Hibotan bakuto: Nidaime shūmei			
1969	Nihon kyokaku-den: hana to ryu	Tamai Kingoro	Lead role	
1969	Nihon ansatsu hiroku	Saburō Aizawa		
1969	Tosei-nin Retsuden			
1969	Showa zankyo-den: Hito-kiri karajishi		Lead role	
1969	Shin Abashiri Bangaichi: Runin-masaki no Kettō	Shinichi Tachibana	Lead role	
1969	Shin Abashiri Bangaichi: Saihate no Nagare-mono	Shinichi Tachibana	Lead role	
1969	Sengo Saidai no Toba		Lead role	
1969	Nihon jokyo-den: kyokaku geisha			
1969	Brothers Serving Time		Lead role	
1970	House of Gamblers			
1970	The Japan Derby Race		Lead role	
1970	Too Late the Hero	Major Yamaguchi	Anglo-American film	
1970	Shôwa zankyô-den: Shinde moraimasu		Lead role	
1970	Saigo no tokkôtai		Lead role	
1970	Nihon kyokaku-den: Nobori Ryu		Lead role	
1970	Yukyo-retsuden		Lead role	
1970	Sutemi no Narazu-mono	Yajima	Lead role	
1970	Shin Abashiri Bangaichi: Dai Shinrin no Kettō		Lead role	
1970	Shin Abashiri Bangaichi: Fubuki no Hagure Ōkami		Lead role	
1970	Nihon jokyo-den: makka na dokyo-bana			
1971	Nihon yakuza-den: Sôchiyô e no michi	Ryutaro Fudo	Lead role	
1971	Gorotsuki mushuku	Isamu Tekada	Lead role	
1971	The Man		Lead role	
1971	Shin Abashiri Bangaichi: Arashi Yobu Shiretoko-misaki	Shinichi Tachibana	Lead role	
1971	Shin Abashiri Bangaichi: Fubuki no Dai Dassō	Shinichi Tachibana	Lead role	
1971	Showa zankyo-den: hoero karajishi		Lead role	
1971	Nihon kyokaku-den: Dosu		Lead role	
1971	Nihon jokyo-den: ketto midare-bana	Yoshioka		
1972	The Kanto Scarlet Cherry Gang	Kuramoto		
1972	Shin Abashiri Bangaichi: Arashi Yobu Danpu Jingi	Shinichi Tachibana	Lead role	
1972	Contemporary Tales of Chivalry: The Traitor Shall Die		Lead role	
1972	Lullaby for a Tough Guy		Lead role	
1972	The Pledge			
1973	Yakuza of the Present	Ryoichi Shimaya	Lead role	
1973	Golgo 13	Golgo 13	Lead role	
1973	Japan's Top Gangster	Kazuo Taoka	Lead role	
1974	Sister Street Fighter	Kazuo Taoka	Lead role	
1974	The Homeless	Joukichi		
1974	The Yakuza	Ken Tanaka	American film	
1975	Roads for Honor	Ichizo Ryuzaki	Lead role	
1975	Great Jailbreak	Ichiro Kozue	Lead role	
1975	The Bullet Train	Tetsuo Okita	Lead role	
1975	The International Gang of Kobe	Masato Dan	Lead role	
1976	Manhunt	Fuyuto Morioka	Lead role	
1977	Mount Hakkoda	Captain Tokushima	Lead role	
1977	The Yellow Handkerchief	Yusaku Shima	Lead role	
1978	Flower of Winter	Hidetsugu Kano	Lead role	
1978	Never Give Up	Takeshi Ajisawa	Lead role	
1980	Dōran	Keisuke Miyagi	Lead role	
1980	A Distant Cry from Spring	Kōsaku Tajima	Lead role	
1981	Station	Eiji Mikami	Lead role	
1982	Detective Story	Detective Mikami	Cameo	
1982	The Longest Tunnel	Go Akutsu	Lead role	
1983	Antarctica	Akira Ushioda	Lead role	
1983	Izakaya Chōji	Chōji	Lead role	
1985	Yasha	Shūji	Lead role	
1988	Umi e, See You	Eiji Honma	Lead role	
1989	Black Rain	Assistant Inspector Masahiro "Mas" Matsumoto	American film	
1989	Buddies	Shūzō Kadokura	Lead role	
1992	Mr. Baseball	Uchiyama	American film	
1994	47 Ronin	Ōishi Kuranosuke	Lead role	
1999	Railroad Man	Otomatsu Satō	Lead role	
2001	The Firefly	Yamaoka Shûji	Lead role	
2005	Riding Alone for Thousands of Miles	Gou-Ichi Takata	Lead role; Chinese film	
2012	Dearest	Eiji Kurashima	Lead role	

== Honours ==
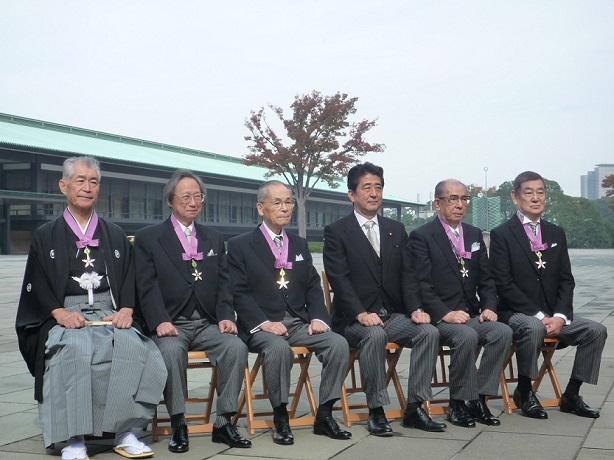
Takakura (far right) received the Order of Culture on November 3, 2013.

- Japan Academy Prize for Outstanding Performance by an Actor in a Leading Role

- 1978 – as Yusaku Shima, in The Yellow Handkerchief
- 1981 – as Kōsaku Tajima, in A Distant Cry from Spring
- 1982 – as Eiji Mikami, in Station
- 1999 – as Otomatsu Satō, in Poppoya

- Japan Academy Prize for Special Award of Honour from the Association

- 2013

- Blue Ribbon Awards

- 1977 – as Yusaku Shima, in The Yellow Handkerchief
- 1999 – as Otomatsu Satō, in Poppoya

- Japanese Medal of Honor (Purple Ribbon) (1998)
- Person of Cultural Merit (2006)
- Order of Culture (2013)
- Junior Third Rank (2014; posthumous)
