= Gallery 339 =

Former art gallery in Philadelphia, United States

Coordinates: 39.947031°N 75.176444°W

Gallery 339 was a photographic art gallery located in Philadelphia, United States. The gallery promoted the work of established and emerging photographers.

Gallery 339 opened in May 2005 and presented several exhibitions featuring work from the USA, Japan, South Korea, and Great Britain. It was Philadelphia's only fine art photography gallery and closed in 2017.
