= Junya Sato =

Japanese film director and screenwriter (1932–2019)

Junya Satō
- 佐藤 純彌
- Born: November 6, 1932; Tokyo, Japan
- Died: February 9, 2019 (aged 86); Tokyo, Japan
- Occupations: Film director, screenwriter
- Children: Tōya Satō
- Parent: Kanichi Satō (father)

Junya Satō (佐藤 純彌, Satō Jun'ya; 6 November 1932 – 9 February 2019) was a Japanese film director and screenwriter.

His son, Tōya Satō (佐藤 東弥, Satō Tōya), is also a film director.

== Career ==
Born in Tokyo, Satō graduated from the University of Tokyo in 1956 with a degree in French literature. He joined the Toei studio and worked as an assistant to such directors as Tadashi Imai and Miyoji Ieki. He debuted as a director in 1963 with Rikugun Zangyaku Monogatari, for which he won a best newcomer's award at the Blue Ribbon Awards. While starting in mostly yakuza film, Satō eventually became known for big budget spectaculars. The Go Masters, a China-Japan co-production he co-directed with Duan Jishun, won the grand prize at the Montreal World Film Festival in 1983. He won the Japan Academy Prize for Director of the Year in 1989 for The Silk Road.

Sato died in Tokyo on 9 February 2019.

== Filmography ==
Year	Japanese Title	English Title	Notes
1963	陸軍残虐物語; Rikugun Zangyaku Monogatari	Tale of Army Brutality	
1963	続・王将; Zoku Ōshō	The King 2	
1964	廓育ち; Kuruwa Sodachi	Raised in a Palace	
1966	愛欲; Aiyoku	Thirst for Love	
1967	組織暴力; Soshiki Bōryoku	Organized Violence	
1967	続組織暴力; Zoku Soshiki Bōryoku	Organized Violence 2	
1968	荒野の渡世人; Kōya no Toseinin	The Drifting Avenger	
1969	日本暴力団 組長と刺客; Nihon Bōryokudan: Kumichō to Shikaku	Japan's Most Violent Gangs: The Boss and the Killer	also co-wrote screenplay
1969	組織暴力 兄弟盃; Soshiki Bōryoku: Kyōdai Sakazuki	The Private Police	
1969	旅に出た極道; Tabi ni Deta Gokudō	Yakuza on Foot	
1970	日本ダービー 勝負; Nihon Derby Shōbu	The Japan Derby Race	also co-wrote screenplay
1970	最後の特攻隊; Saigo no Tokkōtai	The Last Kamikaze	
1971	博徒斬り込み隊; Bakuto Kirikomitai	The Gambler’s Counterattack	also co-wrote screenplay
1971	暴力団再武装; Bōryokudan Sai Busō	The Armed Organization	
1972	ギャング対ギャング 赤と黒のブルース; Gang tai Gang: Aka to Kuro no Blues	Gang vs. Gang: The Red and Black Blues	also wrote screenplay
1972	やくざと抗争 実録安藤組; Yakuza to Kōsō: Jitsuroku Andō-gumi	Quarreling with Yakuza	also co-wrote screenplay
1973	実録 私設銀座警察; Jitsuroku: Shisetsu Ginza Keisatsu	A True Story of the Private Ginza Police	
1973	ゴルゴ13; Gorugo Sātīn	Golgo 13	
1973	実録安藤組 襲撃篇; Jitsuroku Andō-gumi: Shūgekihen	The Ando File	
1974	ルバング島の奇跡 陸軍中野学校; Rubangu-tō no Kiseki: Rikugun Nakano Gakkō	Miracle on Lubang Island: Army Nakano School	
1975	新幹線大爆破; Shinkansen Daibakuha	The Bullet Train	also co-wrote screenplay
1976	君よ噴怒の河を渉れ; Kimi yo Fundo no Kawa o Watare	Manhunt	also co-wrote screenplay
1977	人間の証明; Ningen no Shōmei	Proof of the Man	
1978	野性の証明; Yasei no Shōmei	Never Give Up	
1980	遙かなる走路; Haru Kanaru Sōro	Drive for the Future	
1980	甦れ魔女; Yomigaere Majo	The Way to The Gold Medals	
1982	未完の対局; Mikan no Taikyoku	The Go Masters	
1983	人生劇場; Jinsei Gekijō	Theater of Life ("Youth" segment)	also co-wrote screenplay
1984	空海; Kūkai		
1986	植村直己物語; Uemura Naomi Monogatari	Lost in the Wilderness	also co-wrote screenplay
1988	敦煌; Tonkō	The Silk Road	also co-wrote screenplay
1992	私を抱いてそしてキスして; Watashi o Daite Soshite Kiss Shite	Hold Me and Kiss Me	
1992	おろしや国酔夢譚; Oroshiyakoku Suimutan; Сны о России; Sny o Rossii	Kodayu or Dreams of Russia	also co-wrote screenplay
1994	超能力者 未知への旅人; Chōnōryokusha - Michi e no Tabibito	Psychic: Traveler to the Unknown	
1997	北京原人 Who Are You? Pekin Genjin Who Are You?	The Peking Man	
2005	男たちの大和; Otoko-tachi no Yamato	Yamato	also wrote screenplay
2010	桜田門外ノ変; Sakuradamon-gai no Hen	The Sakurada Gate Incident	also co-wrote screenplay
