= Chie Kobayashi =

Japanese actress and singer

Chie Kobayashi 小林 千絵
- Born: 20 November 1963 (age 62); Toyonaka, Osaka, Japan
- Genres: Japanese pop
- Occupations: Actress, singer
- Years active: 1980–present
- Labels: Pony Canyon; Aqua Promotions

Chie Kobayashi (小林 千絵, Kobayashi Chie) is a Japanese actress and singer.

== Discography ==
=== Single ===
- Itsumo kata omoi (いつも片想い)
  - Released: 21 March 1983
- Zutto rhapsody (ずっとラプソディ)
  - Released: 21 June 1983
- Mizuiro no kachūsha (水色のカチューシャ)
  - Released: 21 September 1983
- LOVE WITH YOU
  - Released: 21 January 1984
    - used as opening song of the anime Katri, Girl of the Meadows
- Chiguhagu KISS (ちぐはぐキッス)
  - Released: 21 May 1984
- Ojisan no kimochi mo shiranaide (おじさんの気持も知らないで)
  - Released: 21 September 1984
- Hotel Osaka (ホテルOSAKA)
  - Released: 21 May 1985
- Kimagure MY LOVE (気まぐれマイ・ラブ)
  - Released: 21 July 1986
- Tsuyogari (つよがり)
  - Released: 5 October 1988
- STORY
  - Released: 21 June 1991
- Koi ni odoreba (恋に踊れば)
  - Released: 17 March 1995

== Albums ==
- Namida STAR Girls
  - Released: 21 October 1983
- Best of Chie Kobayashi
  - Released: 19 June 2002
- Namida STAR Girls (CD)
  - Released: 16 July 2008
