= Abashiri Prison (film) =

- Theatrical release poster
- Directed by: Teruo Ishii
- Written by: Teruo Ishii
- Based on: Abashiri Bangaichi by Hajime Itō
- Starring: Ken Takakura; Kōji Nanbara; Tetsurō Tamba; Toru Abe; Kanjūrō Arashi
- Cinematography: Yoshikazu Yamasawa
- Edited by: Akira Suzuki
- Music by: Masao Yagi
- Distributed by: Toei Company
- Release date: April 18, 1965 (Japan)
- Running time: 92 minutes
- Country: Japan
- Language: Japanese

Abashiri Prison (Japanese: 網走番外地, Hepburn: Abashiri Bangaichi; lit. 'Off-the-Grid in Abashiri'), also known as A Man from Abashiri Prison, is a 1965 Japanese film written and directed by Teruo Ishii. Based on the 1956 novel of the same name by Hajime Itō, Ishii wrote the script as a remake of the 1958 American film The Defiant Ones. The film is the first entry in Toei Company's Abashiri Prison series, which stars Ken Takakura. Highly successful, it was the first hit in the yakuza film genre. Abashiri Prison made Takakura a star and was followed by 17 sequels.

== Synopsis ==
In Hokkaido's Abashiri Prison, Shinichi Tachibana, model prisoner with six months remaining in his sentence is handcuffed to Gonda, a hardened criminal. When Gonda and other inmates escape from the prison, Tachibana must go along.

== Cast ==
- Ken Takakura as Shinichi Tachibana
- Kōji Nanbara as Gonzo Gonda
- Tetsurō Tamba as Officer Tsubaki
- Toru Abe as Heizo Yoda
- Kanjūrō Arashi as Torakichi Akuta
- Kyosuke Machida as Natsume
- Kunie Tanaka as Otsuki
- Kenji Ushio as a prisoner
- Koji Takishima
- Koji Miemachi
- Kazu Sugiyoshi
- Seiya Satou
- Joji Yoshimura
- Koji Sekiyama
- Tadashi Suganuma
- Tatsuya Kitayama

== Production ==
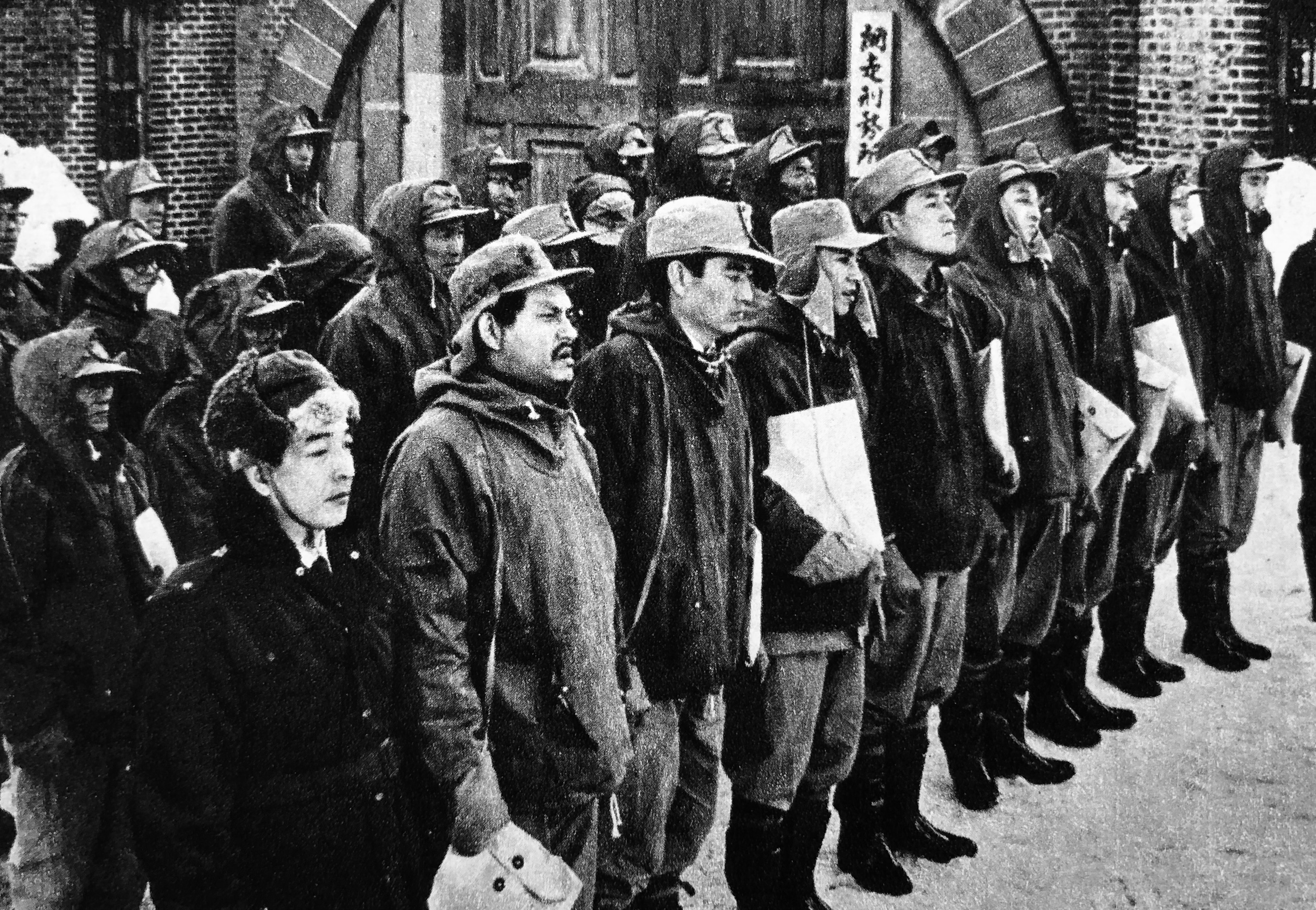
Cast members filming a scene

Hajime Itō wrote the 1956 novel Abashiri Bangaichi based on his experience incarcerated at the real Abashiri Prison in the early 1950s. The book was previously adapted into a film by Nikkatsu in 1959. Director Teruo Ishii modeled his version on the 1958 American film The Defiant Ones, which he had wanted to make a Japanese version of ever since he first saw the film. When Ishii was offered to adapt Abashiri Bangaichi, he did not want to do it after reading the novel; "the story was too cheesy—it was just a melodrama." However, Toei Company agreed to allow him to change the story and approved of remaking The Defiant Ones.

Ishii said the script was written quickly, but was done without any location scouting, which caused problems when they actually got to Hokkaido. It took a whole month just to find a railroad to shoot the handcar escape scene. They finally found one in Shintoku, but the small town had no inns, and the crew had to stay at a dormitory in the mountains. The winter climate also made things difficult, as the engines in the crew's cars would freeze overnight.

Abashiri Prison is known for its titular theme song sung by its lead, Ken Takakura. A traditional folk song sung by prisoners, Ishii had first heard it played by former yakuza in a television documentary. He quickly grabbed a tape recorder and recorded it, and then had the TV station identify it for him. He first used the song in his film Kaoyaku, which was released earlier in 1965, where it was also sung by Takakura.

== Release ==
According to Tony Rayns, Abashiri Prison was released by Toei in 1965 as the B movie of a double feature.

Eureka Entertainment released Abashiri Prison in the United Kingdom and North America in a Blu-ray set that also includes the second and third films in the series, Another Abashiri Prison Story and Abashiri Prison: Saga of Homesickness, as part of the Masters of Cinema series on May 27, 2024.

== Reception ==
The success of Abashiri Prison made Takakura a top star and gave Ishii prestige as a director. In a 2013 article for the British Film Institute, Jasper Sharp included it on a list of 10 Great Japanese Gangster Films and called it wildly entertaining. Stuart Galbraith IV praised the performances of the film's cast overall, with the exception of Koji Nanbara, whom he found "more than a little over-the-top". He felt its monochrome lensing added "immeasurably to the harsh, snowy environment", something lost on the later films in the franchise due to them being in color. In a review of Eureka's release of the first three films, Dillon Gonzales of Geek Vibes Nation cited the original as his favorite. He called Takakura an excellent lead, and highly recommended the box set.

== Sequels ==
Toei produced 17 sequels in the Abashiri Prison film series between 1965 and 1972, all starring Ken Takakura and scored by Masao Yagi, and with Ishii returning to direct the first nine. The final eight installments were released under the title New Abashiri Prison, with Masahiro Makino directing the first, Kiyoshi Saeki the third, and Yasuo Furuhata handling the other six.

Mark Schilling writes that Japanese critics and fans widely regard the third installment, Abashiri Prison: Saga of Homesickness (1965), as the best in the franchise. Rayns also cited it as his favorite in the series. Ishii chose the first film as his personal favorite as he said that is the one he worked the hardest on. After that, he said the studio forced him to make them one after the other and it became "routine". When asked why the third film was set in Kyushu, Ishii explained that when he told Toei he could not make another installment in the series yet because it was not winter, they remarked that it did not matter and he could shoot anything as long as the theme song was on the soundtrack. Galbraith IV wrote that the second, third and fourth entries in the franchise all reached the top 10 of domestic films at the Japanese box office of 1965, ranking sixth, fourth and second, respectively. The following year, the fifth, sixth and seventh films also made the top 10, ranking ninth, third and first, respectively.

Year	Film	Director	Screenwriter(s)
1965	Another Abashiri Prison Story; Zoku Abashiri Bangaichi (続 網走番外地)	Teruo Ishii	Teruo Ishii
1965	Abashiri Prison: Saga of Homesickness; Abashiri Bangaichi Bōkyō-hen (網走番外地 望郷篇)	Teruo Ishii	Teruo Ishii
1965	Abashiri Bangaichi Hokkai-hen (網走番外地 北海篇)	Teruo Ishii	Teruo Ishii
1966	Abashiri Bangaichi Kōya no Taiketsu (網走番外地 荒野の対決)	Teruo Ishii	Teruo Ishii
1966	Abashiri Bangaichi Nangoku no Taiketsu (網走番外地 南国の対決)	Teruo Ishii	Teruo Ishii
1966	Abashiri Bangaichi Dai Setsugen no Taiketsu (網走番外地 大雪原の対決)	Teruo Ishii	Teruo Ishii, Hiroo Matsuda, Fumio Kanami
1967	Abashiri Bangaichi Kettō Reika 30-do (網走番外地 決斗零下30度)	Teruo Ishii	Teruo Ishii
1967	Abashiri Bangaichi Aku e no Chōsen (網走番外地 悪への挑戦)	Teruo Ishii	Teruo Ishii
1967	Abashiri Bangaichi Fubuki no Tōsō (網走番外地 吹雪の斗争)	Teruo Ishii	Teruo Ishii
1968	Shin Abashiri Bangaichi (新 網走番外地)	Masahiro Makino	Akira Murao
1969	Shin Abashiri Bangaichi Runin-misaki no Kettō (新網走番外地 流人岬の血斗)	Yasuo Furuhata	Akira Murao
1969	Shin Abashiri Bangaichi Sai Hate no Nagare-sha (新網走番外地 さいはての流れ者)	Kiyoshi Saeki	Akira Murao
1970	Shin Abashiri Bangaichi Dai Shinrin no Kettō (新網走番外地 大森林の決斗)	Yasuo Furuhata	Akira Murao
1970	Shin Abashiri Bangaichi Fubuki no Hagure Ōkami (新網走番外地 吹雪のはぐれ狼)	Yasuo Furuhata	Akira Murao
1971	Shin Abashiri Bangaichi Arashi Yobu Shiretoko-misaki (新網走番外地 嵐呼ぶ知床岬)	Yasuo Furuhata	Akira Murao
1971	Shin Abashiri Bangaichi Fubuki no Dai Dassō (新網走番外地 吹雪の大脱走)	Yasuo Furuhata	Morimasa Owaku, Yasuo Furuhata
1972	Shin Abashiri Bangaichi Arashi Yobu Danpu Jingi (新網走番外地 嵐呼ぶダンプ仁義)	Yasuo Furuhata	Akira Murao
