= Chalet Girl =

2011 film by Phil Traill

- Theatrical release poster
- Directed by: Phil Traill
- Written by: Tom Williams
- Produced by: Wolfgang Behr; Pippa Cross; Dietmar Guentsche; Harriet Rees
- Starring: Felicity Jones; Ed Westwick; Bill Nighy; Brooke Shields; Tamsin Egerton; Bill Bailey; Sophia Bush
- Cinematography: Ed Wild
- Edited by: Robin Sales
- Music by: Christian Henson
- Production companies: Cross Creek Pictures; UK Film Council; Aegis Film Fund; Prescience; Metropolis International Sales; CrossDay Productions Ltd.; Kaleidoscope Films; Neue Bioskop Film; Novotny & Novotny Filmproduktion GmbH
- Distributed by: Momentum Pictures (United Kingdom); Paramount Pictures (Germany, Switzerland and United Kingdom); ThimFilm GmbH (Austria)
- Release dates: 17 February 2011 (Netherlands); 16 March 2011 (United Kingdom); 17 March 2011 (Germany); 18 March 2011 (Austria)
- Running time: 97 minutes
- Countries: United Kingdom; Germany; Austria
- Languages: English; German
- Budget: £8 million (US$13 million)
- Box office: $5.5 million

Chalet Girl is a 2011 romantic comedy sports film directed by Phil Traill. The film stars Felicity Jones and Ed Westwick in the lead roles and also features Ken Duken, Tamsin Egerton, Sophia Bush, Bill Bailey, Brooke Shields, and Bill Nighy. Written by Tom Williams, the film was produced by Pippa Cross, Harriet Rees, Dietmar Guentsche, and Wolfgang Behr. Chalet Girl was filmed on location in Sankt Anton am Arlberg, Austria, and in Garmisch-Partenkirchen, Germany. While critical reaction to the film was mixed, Jones' performance was praised. The film grossed US$5.5 million worldwide against an £8 million (US$13 million) budget.

== Plot ==
Nineteen-year-old Kim Mathews (Felicity Jones), is introduced by a television presenter (Miquita Oliver) as a former skateboarding champion whose mother was killed in a car accident. Kim gives up skateboarding and begins working in a fast-food burger bar to pay household bills to help her father (Bill Bailey).

When she and her father need more money to pay the bills, Kim looks for a job with better pay. Her friend recommends she work as a "chalet girl" in the Alps. Kim is initially turned down for the position but is accepted at the last minute as the current chalet girl broke her leg. Another chalet girl, Georgie (Tamsin Egerton), is sent to help Kim. They initially do not like each other as Kim is not posh, cannot ski or snowboard, and has never been to the Alps. Kim is instantly attracted to Jonny (Ed Westwick), the rich son of Richard (Bill Nighy) and Caroline (Brooke Shields), though Jonny is in a relationship with Chloe (Sophia Bush). Kim tries to teach herself to snowboard, but finds it difficult. Mikki (Ken Duken), seeing her struggle, teaches her to snowboard and persuades her to try out for a snowboarding competition to win €25,000 (US$35,000).

Georgie and Kim develop their friendship. When Georgie finds out it is Kim's birthday, she takes Kim to a club where they get drunk. She persuades Kim to bring the party to the chalet as the family is out. Georgie, Kim, Mikki, and Georgie's friend Jules (Georgia King) return to the chalet and relax nude in the hot tub. Georgie and Mikki begin to hook up. As Kim gets out of the tub to shovel snow on herself, the family returns home and sees her naked. Georgie and Kim clean the house thoroughly and attempt to pay the family back for any damage that was done to the house.

Meanwhile, Kim continues to work on her snowboarding skills and tries to conquer her fear of high jumps, which reminds her of the car crash that killed her mother.

Kim and Jonny become closer. After a business trip to the chalet, Jonny decides to stay behind, presumably to spend more time with Kim. Jonny offers to pay her to teach him how to snowboard. After a day in the snow, they kiss briefly and end up having sex. An onlooker, Bernhard (Gregor Bloéb), spots them together and alerts Jonny's mother, Caroline. The morning after their one-night stand, Caroline catches them and mentions that Jonny is engaged to Chloe. Kim leaves the house, upset that Jonny lied to her.

Before she departs, Kim's father persuades her to stay for the competition, saying it would have been what her mother wanted. Meanwhile, Jonny breaks up with Chloe at their engagement party in London. Chloe asks if he is in love with Kim, which he confirms. After hearing the news of their break up, Kim seems to not care about Jonny anymore.

Mikki and Kim begin the snowboard competition. Mikki fails the high jump and breaks his arm. Kim does well on all obstacles until she gets to the high jump; she stops as she remembers the car accident again. She places 21st in the competition, not placing high enough to make the top 20 finalists. However, she is the first reserve if any finalists drop out. Just then, world champion Tara (Tara Dakides, as herself), pulls out and gives her spot to Kim.

Kim makes all the obstacles and jumps, and visualizing her mother cheering her on from the crowd, she lands the high jump perfectly and wins. Jonny, having come back after breaking up with Chloe, appears behind Kim and apologizes. The two banter for a moment before they kiss. Richard and Caroline watch the competition on TV, where the camera captures Jonny and Kim kissing. Caroline, seeing her son's happiness, agrees to accept Kim.

== Cast ==
- Felicity Jones as Kim Matthews
- Ed Westwick as Jonny
- Bill Nighy as Richard
- Brooke Shields as Caroline
- Bill Bailey as Bill Matthews
- Tamsin Egerton as Georgie
- Nicholas Braun as Nigel
- Sophia Bush as Chloe
- Ken Duken as Mikki
- Tara Dakides as Tara
- Adam Bousdoukos as Willy
- Georgia King as Jules
- Gregor Bloéb as Bernhardt
- Jo Martin as Lexi
- Angela Curren as Interviewer 1
- Jessica Hynes as Interviewer 2

== Production ==
=== Development ===
Chalet Girl was one of several pitches by Tom Williams to producer Harriet Rees at the 2007 International Screenwriters' Festival. Williams had previously worked at Working Title Films as a script reader, and described himself as sharing their "commercial sensibility". Rees described Chalet Girl as the pitch that stood out, and Williams began to work on a script. The first draft of the script was delivered on Christmas Eve 2007, with a further 123 versions created before shooting ended. Rees met director Phil Traill in Los Angeles while working on a different project; following a phone call from Williams, who Traill knew from their time at Newcastle University, the director was attracted to the Chalet Girl script. First-time feature producer Rees teamed up with Pippa Cross, who she described as her "mentor".

A few changes were made to the script during development, including removing a younger brother of the character Kim. Due to budgetary restraints, a number of scenes were dropped or had locations moved. Costume designers flew to meet the actors' availability, including to New York City to meet with Ed Westwick and Soho, London, with Bill Nighy. Both Nighy and Shields wore some of their own items on screen to save the film's budget, including Shields' engagement ring.

Research trips were made to the Méribel resort and to snowboarding championships in Laax. Traill joked that due to insurance reasons he was only allowed to ski on such trips, and so made as many of them as possible. The no-ski ban was extended to himself, Ed Westwick and Joe Geary, the first assistant director, during the early stages of production. The film was partially funded by the UK Film Council, who gave it a grant of £800,000 (US$1,280,000), and 10% of the budget was provided by the Enterprise Investment Scheme.

=== Casting ===
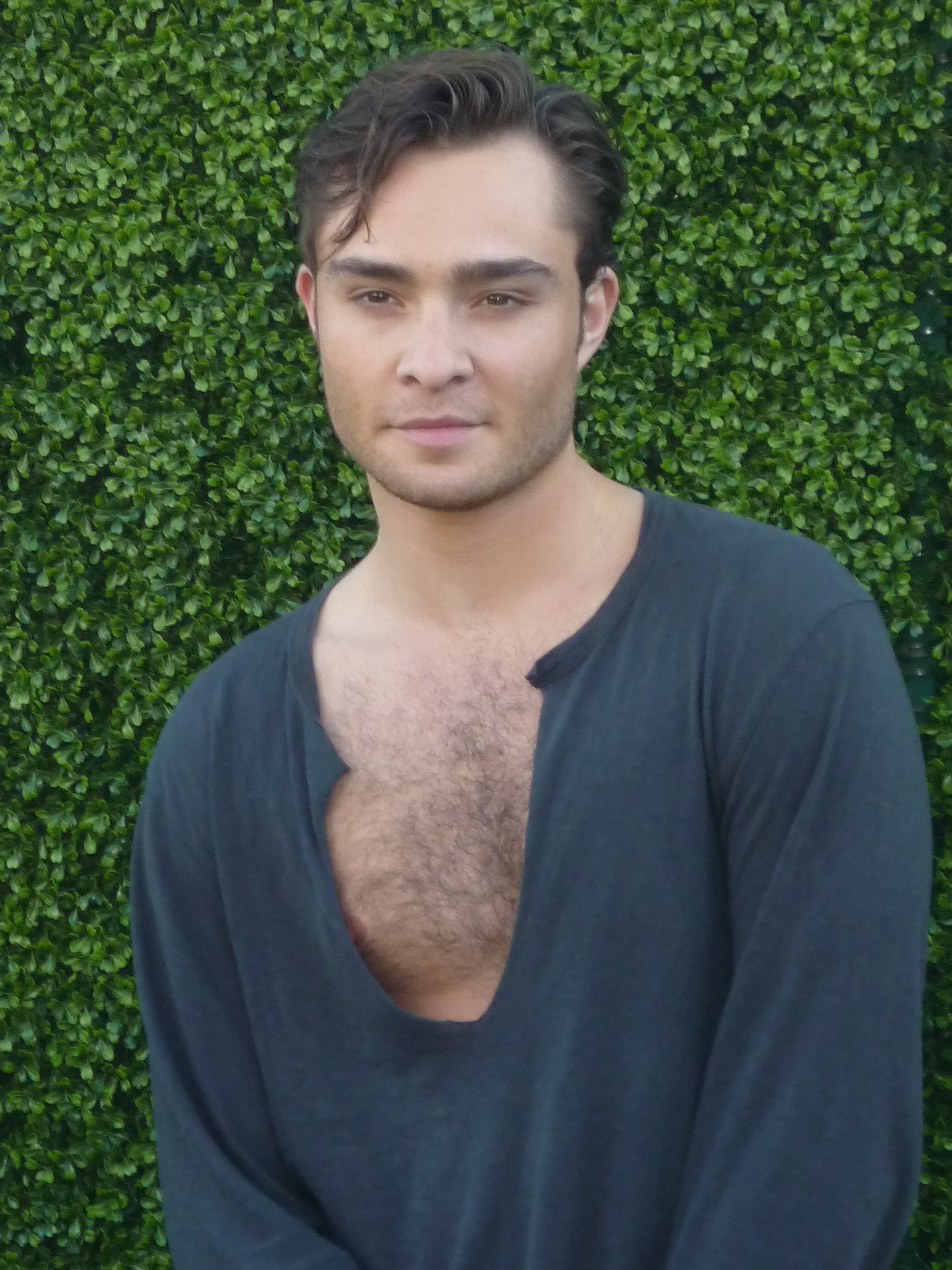
Ed Westwick took the role of Jonny as he liked the idea of portraying a "nice guy".

Felicity Jones was cast in the lead role of Kim. Producer Pippa Cross recalled the moment that they first met, "I remember her walking into the room when we were casting and the director Phil Traill looked at me and raised his eyebrows at me and I said: 'That's Kim'. It was as simple as that." She was known to the production staff previously following a ten-year stint in The Archers and the Royal Court Theatre production of That Face. Jones described her character as a "witty, spirited beast", and cited the collaborative process with Traill as the reason she took the role.

Ed Westwick was cast as Jonny. He took the role for a change of genre, because he liked the idea of playing a "nice guy", and in order to practise his skiing. He said of the film, "It's a return to that sort of English comedy that I grew up with. It has elements of Richard Curtis and that classic English wit, which is great".

Playing the character of Georgie was Tamsin Egerton, who joined the project because of the quality of the script, in particular the banter between Georgie and Kim. She became attached early in the process as she was eager to work with Jones. She had auditioned a year before filming started and assumed she had been cast. Her only concern was that Georgie was similar to Chelsea, the character she portrayed in St Trinian's and St Trinian's 2: The Legend of Fritton's Gold.

Brooke Shields became attached to the project as Caroline about a month before her shooting began. Shields described herself as "honored" to be working with Bill Nighy who was cast as her on-screen husband, Richard.

Comedian Bill Bailey played Bill, the father of Kim. He was approached by Traill who used to live nearby him and took him for a drink at the local pub. Bailey was "chuffed" to get the role.

German actor Ken Duken met the producers initially at the Berlin International Film Festival, and was cast as the Finnish character, Mikki, after being called in to audition. Tara Dakides, a professional snowboarder, portrayed herself in the film. She first became involved in the summer of 2009 and felt "extremely flattered as well as terrified" about playing herself on screen. In addition, Sophia Bush was cast as Chloe, Nicholas Braun as Nigel, and Georgia King as Jules.

=== Filming ===
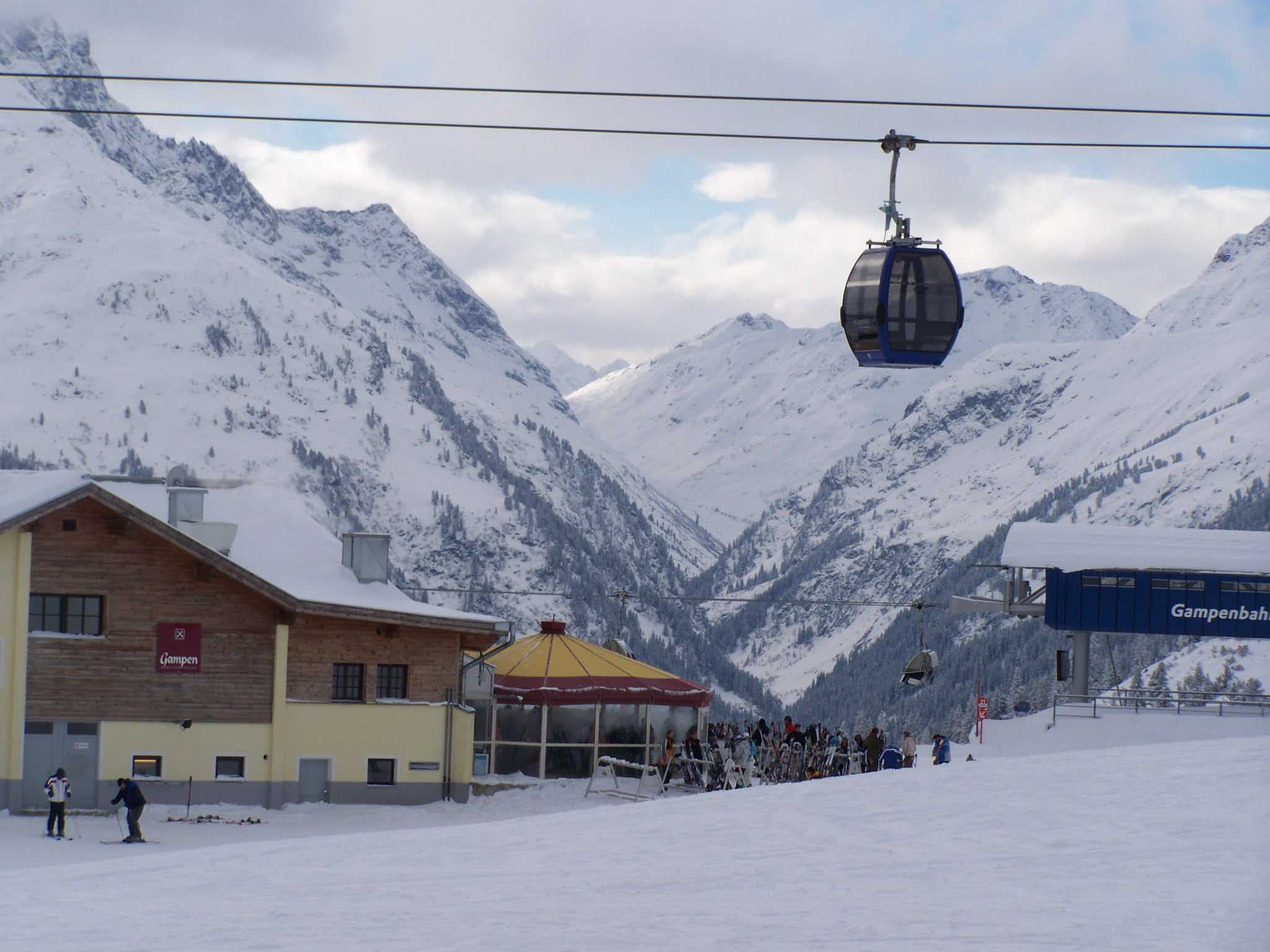
Skiing scenes were shot on location on the slopes of Sankt Anton am Arlberg.

Chalet Girl was filmed on location in Sankt Anton am Arlberg, in Tyrol, western Austria, over the course of two months. Ed Westwick went into filming as an already accomplished skier, having skied since the age of 12, but was not trained on the snowboard, only ever having had one lesson. Felicity Jones had only previously been on dry ski slopes as a child and had never been on a snowboard. She trained for six hours a day for four weeks in order to become proficient enough to film. She said, "I wanted to do as much of the groundwork on the board that Kim does as possible, hence the rigorous training." Jones also experienced life as a real chalet girl with staff at Flexiski. Tamsin Egerton had no ski or snowboard experience, and spent time with a trainer. Although she became "hooked" on skiing, she is not seen skiing in the final cut of the film, though she is seen falling in the blooper reel. Filming had to be stopped when the mountain was evacuated due to a snow storm. The village scenes were filmed in Garmisch-Partenkirchen in southern Germany, including using the interior of a German log cabin to double for a house in west London. The break-up scene was filmed in the Grand Hotel Sonnenbichl on the outskirts of Garmisch.

Nighy filmed his scenes over a period of two weeks, and developed a football rivalry with Westwick as the two actors supported Manchester United and Chelsea, respectively. Shields and Braun became friends during the filming; Shields said she "wanted to adopt him as my brother".

== Soundtrack ==
- "Bad Company" – Performed by This Is Freedom
- "Posh Girls" – Performed by Scouting for Girls
- "Pack Up" – Performed by Eliza Doolittle
- "Edgar" – Performed by Lucky Elephant
- "Upside Down" – Performed by Paloma Faith
- "Tokyo (Vampires & Wolves)" – Performed by The Wombats
- "Disease" – Performed by Livingston
- "Go" – Performed by Livingston
- "Cola Coca" – Performed by Rosie Oddie & The Odd Squad
- "Sky Surfers" – Performed by Toddla T
- "Wake Up" – Performed by Sliimy
- "Fader" – Performed by The Temper Trap
- "Chicken Payback" – Performed by The Bees
- "Something Good Can Work" – Performed by Two Door Cinema Club
- "Who'd Want to Find Love?" – Performed by Ellie Goulding and Jonny Lattimer
- "Amazing" – Performed by One Eskimo
- "Explosions" – Performed by Eli "Paperboy" Reed
- "No Regrets" – Performed by This Is Freedom
- "Do You Want it All?" – Performed by Two Door Cinema Club
- "Where We Belong" – Performed by Lostprophets
- "Chequered Love" – Performed by Kim Wilde

== Release ==
Chalet Girl was released in cinemas in the United Kingdom on 16 March 2011 by Momentum Pictures and Paramount Pictures. To promote the film, there was an online campaign that integrated social media into an interactive trailer; clicking a "like" button took viewers to additional features. The British premiere was held at Westfield London on 8 February 2011. Further showings were held across the country to raise money for Comic Relief. Under the title Powder Girl, the film was released in Germany on 17 March 2011 by Paramount Pictures Germany and in Austria the following day by ThimFilm GmbH. In the United States, it was released by IFC Films in select cinemas and through video on demand on 14 October 2011.

== Reception ==
=== Critical response ===
Chalet Girl received mixed reviews. On the review aggregator website Rotten Tomatoes, the film holds an approval rating of 77% based on 43 reviews, with an average rating of 5.8/10. The website's critics consensus reads, "Chalet Girl is light comedic fun geared for teenage girls, featuring a charming performance from Felicity Jones." Metacritic, which uses a weighted average, assigned the film a score of 42 out of 100 based on 5 critics, indicating "mixed or average reviews".

Alex Towers of Trinity News gave the film a negative review, writing "limping along from poor set-ups to glaringly obvious conclusions, the film's ninety-seven minutes feels three times as long." Michael Leader for Den of Geek gave the film two stars, describing some of the jokes as "god-awful" and writing that Felicity Jones was an "absolutely delightful screen presence". Peter Bradshaw also gave the film two stars in a review for The Guardian, describing it as "amiable, silly, feelgood stuff".

Other critics gave the film positive reviews, such as Tim Robey of The Daily Telegraph, who gave the film three stars, describing Ed Westwick as "goofy" and praising the performance of Bill Bailey as "lovably hopeless". Time Out reviewer Dave Calhoun also gave it three stars, describing it as "loud, silly and surprisingly fun", and "corny and proud of it". The same star rating was given by Total Film, where Matthew Leyland described the production values as "tatty", but Felicity Jones as a "natural, likeable everygirl". Writing for the Daily Mirror, Mark Adams gave the film four stars; for Screen Daily, he wrote that "it is enjoyable entertainment with no real cinematic pretentions" and praised Jones's performance, saying it confirmed her qualities as a lead actor. Sophie Ivan for Film4 compared Chalet Girl to those from Working Title Films, saying that it was the first British comedy since then that "won't make you want to stick pins in your eyes", and gave three and a half stars.

=== Box office ===
In its first week of release in the United Kingdom, Chalet Girl was the top-placed new film with £678,000 (US$1,090,000) in the first five days, having opened in 381 cinemas. Chalet Girl's earnings were the lowest for a top-placed new film since Whip It in April 2010. In its first week, was the fourth-most popular film, behind Rango, Battle: Los Angeles and Unknown.
