= List of Most Extreme Elimination Challenge episodes =

This is a list of episodes of Most Extreme Elimination Challenge. Most Extreme Elimination Challenge was a TV show.

== Series overview ==
Season	Episodes	Originally released	
Season	Episodes	First released	Last released
1	13	April 19, 2003	July 19, 2003
2	13	July 31, 2003	November 6, 2003
3	27	April 22, 2004	April 7, 2005
4	15	October 20, 2005	March 9, 2006
5	13	November 9, 2006	February 9, 2007

== Episodes ==
=== Season 1 (2003) ===
No. overall	No. in season	Title	Winner	Original release date
1	1	"Meat Handlers vs. Cartoon Voice Actors (aka Network Boss)"	Cartoon Voice Actors	April 19, 2003
Challenges include: Sinkers & Floaters, Log Drop, Wall Buggers, and Boulder Dash.
2	2	"Donors vs. Addicts"	Addicts	April 19, 2003
Challenges include: Mud Butlers, Dash to Death, Rotating Surfboard of Death, Brass Balls, and Pole Riders.
3	3	"Dairy Workers vs. Automobile Workers (aka Cows vs. Cars)"	Dairy Workers	April 26, 2003
Challenges include: Wall Bangers, Get Hard, Saddle Sores, Swish Bucklers, and Teetering Temple of Crippling Doom (Tumbling Dominoes of Doom).
4	4	"Cops vs. Cons"	Cops	May 3, 2003
Challenges include: Dope on a Rope, Prison Break (Slippery Slope of Slanted Death), Hand Job, Bunk Buddies, Legal Maze (Door Jam), and Yankin' It.
5	5	"The Couples Show"	Rick & Lani Chaney	May 10, 2003
Challenges include: Plank Spankers, The "Romantic" Rotating Surfboard of Death, Hot Steaming Bowl of Love (Irritable Bowl Syndrome), The Sticky Stuff of Love (Window Pain (Couples Edition)), and Brass Balls "of Love".
6	6	"Inventors vs. Ex-Child Actors"	Inventors	May 17, 2003
Challenges include: Get Over It (Slippery Slope of Slanted Death), Sinkers & Floaters, Door Jam, Le Tour de Grand Prix, and Log Drop.
7	7	"College Girls"	Northwestern Bendover	May 24, 2003
Challenges include: Wall of Hidden Blistering Death (Slippery Slope of Slanted Death), Boulder Dash, Blind-Sided Date (Dead End Zone), Sinkers & Floaters, Ball Busters, and Log Drop.
8	8	"Educators vs. Outdoorsmen"	Outdoorsmen	May 31, 2003
Challenges include: Door Slammers (Great Holes of Glory), Sinkers & Floaters, Wall of Maim, Pole Riders, and Log Drop.
9	9	"Travel Industry vs. Circus Workers (aka Circus and Airlines)"	Travel Industry	June 7, 2003
Challenges include: Slippery Slope of Slanted Death, Bird Droppings, Foul Balls, Little Man in the Boat, Corn Holders, and Mudballs (Dirty Muddy Balls).
10	10	"Physical Fitness vs. Music Industry"	Music Industry	June 26, 2003
Challenges include: Turtle Gut Check (Turtle Hurdlers), Shaft Grabbers, Clear Sphere of Fear, and Jerk & Release.
11	11	"Fashion vs. Religion"	Fashion	June 26, 2003
Challenges include: Yank My Dinghy, Buck Off, Eat Shitake, and Runaway Stump.
12	12	"Adult Entertainment vs. Home Improvement (aka Porn vs. Construction)"	Home Improvement	July 12, 2003
Challenges include: Athlete's Feet, Dope on a Rope, Elimination Idol, Dash to Death, and Rotating Surfboard of Death.
13	13	"Gambling Industry vs. Medical Professionals"	Medical Professionals	July 19, 2003
Challenges include: Sack Lunch (Bagel Bumpers), Boulder Dash, Dead End Zone, and Brass Balls.

=== Season 2 (2003) ===
No. overall	No. in season	Title	Winner	Original release date
14	1	"Hobbyists vs. Food Service"	Food Service	July 31, 2003
Challenges include: Sinkers & Floaters, Saddle Sores, Wall Bangers, and Log Drop.
15	2	"Hi-Tech vs. Civil Service"	Civil Service	August 7, 2003
Challenges include: Dope on a Rope, Circle Jerkers, Swamp Gassers, and Brass Balls.
16	3	"White House Employees vs. Cable TV Workers"	White House Employees	August 16, 2003
This is the first episode to air after TNN rebranded to Spike TV, which is mentioned often throughout the episodes. Challenges include: Rotating Surfboard of Death, Door Jam, Mine Games, and Tumbling Dominoes of Doom.
17	4	"Reality TV vs. Animal Lovers"	Animal Lovers	August 21, 2003
Challenges include: Window Pain, Dash to Death, Loogie Launch, Endangering Species, and Log Drop.
18	5	"Toys & Games vs. Clerical Workers"	Toys & Games	August 28, 2003
Challenges include: Great Holes of Glory, Skid Markers, Log Drop, and Chum in The Mouth. Note: Some of the footage for Log Drop is reused in this episode.
19	6	"Beauty Pageants vs. Military Personnel"	Military Personnel	September 11, 2003
Challenges include: Sinkers and Floaters, Turtle Hurdlers, Crossing the Poo-Tomac, Pole Riders, and Boulder Dash. Note: Some of the footage for Boulder Dash is reused in this episode.
20	7	"Entrepreneurs vs. Hoteliers"	Hoteliers	September 18, 2003
Challenges include: Dirty Muddy Balls, Saddle Sores, Staff Infectors, and Rotating Surfboard of Death.
21	8	"Former Olympians - USA vs. The World"	USA (by Democracy)	September 25, 2003
Challenges include: Sinkers & Floaters, Dope on a Rope, Dash to Death, and Log Drop.
22	9	"Unions vs. Entertainment Media"	Entertainment Media	October 2, 2003
Challenges include: Window Pain, Irritable Bowl Syndrome, Muddy Runs, and Tumbling Dominoes of Doom.
23	10	"Wedding Industry vs. Trucking Industry"	Wedding Industry	October 9, 2003
Challenges include: Mud Butlers, Le Tour de Grand Prix, Brass Balls, and Nut Baggers.
24	11	"Finance Industry vs. Alcohol Industry"	Finance Industry	October 16, 2003
This special night-time edition of MXC sees the Financial Industry take on the Alcohol Industry. Challenges include: Rotating Surfboard of Death, Eat Shitake, Pole Riders, and Log Drop.
25	12	"Monster Edition - Real Monsters vs. Product Mascots"	Product Mascots	October 30, 2003
Challenges Include: Sinkers & Floaters, Intestinal Fortitude, Dry Balls (Dirty Muddy Balls), and The Impassable Stones of Mt. McKidney. Note: Some of the monsters in this episode are from assorted incarnations of the Ultraman series.
26	13	"Arctic Edition - Fast Food vs. Aerospace Industry"	Fast Food	November 6, 2003
Challenges include: Sno Man's Land, "Frozen" Wall Bangers, Sperm Wheelers, and The Frigid Slope of Icy Death.

=== Season 3 (2004–05) ===
No. overall	No. in season	Title	Winner	Original release date
27	1	"MXC Almost Live - Greeks vs. Geeks"	Tie	April 22, 2004
Tony Hawk and Tara Dakides guest star as team captains, live in Orlando, Florida. Challenges include: Wall Bangers, Sinkers & Floaters, Window Pain, and Log Drop. Notes: 1) Footage for this episode was directed by Scott Fishman; 2) Footage for this episode was recorded at Nickelodeon Studios in Universal Studios. 3) This is the only episode where some people's voices are not dubbed (Tony Hawk and Tara Dakides).
28	2	"Squeeze out the Vote (aka Republicans vs. Democrats vs. Third Party)"	Nobody (because "Just like in politics, nobody wins")	April 29, 2004
Challenges include: Rock the Moat (Sinkers & Floaters), Dark Horse Race (Saddle Sores), Pork the Barrel (Jerk & Release), Rotating Surfboard of Political Suicide (Rotating Surfboard of Death), Mud Slingers (Dirty Muddy Balls), and Congressional Log Jam (Log Drop). Notes: 1) This is the only episode in the series to feature three teams. 2) Some of the footage for Mud Slingers and Jerk & Release are reused in this episode.
29	3	"Unemployed vs. Environmentalists"	Unemployed	May 6, 2004
Challenges include: Great Holes of Glory, Finger It, Dope on a Rope, Irritable Bowl Syndrome, and Pole Riders.
30	4	"Snack Food vs. Print Media"	Snack Food	May 13, 2004
Challenges include: Slippery Slope of Slanted Death, Door Jam, Circle Jerkers, and Brass Balls.
31	5	"Paranormalists vs. Baby Products"	Paranormalists	May 20, 2004
Challenges include: Mud Butlers, Yank 'Em (Yankin' It), Flailing Wall (Wall of Maim), and Log Drop. Note: Footage for Log Drop is reused in this episode.
32	6	"Dentists vs. Explorers"	Dentists	May 27, 2004
Challenges include: Dash to Death, Hand Job, Wall Bangers, and Sinkers & Floaters.
33	7	"City Kids vs. Country Kids"	Tie	June 3, 2004
Challenges include: Great Escape From Foster Care, "Lil'" Sinkers & Floaters, Irritable Bowl Training (Syndrome), and Rotating Surfboard Of Death "Jr."
34	8	"Organized Crime vs. Weight Loss Industry"	Weight Loss Industry (Later changed to Organized Crime)	June 10, 2004
Challenges include: Dead Men Walking, Runaway Stump, Little Man in the Boat, and Tumbling Dominoes of Doom.
35	9	"Novelty & Gifts vs. The Death Industry"	Novelty & Gifts	June 17, 2004
Challenges include: Wet Spot, Circle Jerkers "Ahoy", Elimination Idol, and Wall Bangers.
36	10	"Amusement Park Industry vs. World's Oldest Profession (Sex for Hire)"	Amusement Park Industry	June 24, 2004
Challenges include: Hosin' The Hos (Slippery Slope of Slanted Death), Eat Shitake, Brass Balls, and Sinkers & Floaters.
37	11	"CSI/Forensics vs. Children's Entertainment"	CSI/Forensics	September 2, 2004
Challenges include: Wall Bangers, Buck Off, Sinkers & Floaters, and Brass Balls. Note: This is the first episode of the season to have a cold opening.
38	12	"The Master Debaters - Kerry/Edwards Supporters vs Bush/Cheney Supporters"	Bush/Cheney Supporters (originally Kerry/Edwards supporters who were later disqualified due to "dangling jabs")	October 7, 2004
Challenges include: Sinkers & Floaters, Pie in the Sky, Boulder Dash, and Character Assassination (Battlefelch Earth).
39	13	"Oil Industry vs. Make-Over Industry"	Oil Industry	December 2, 2004
Challenges include: Roulective Surgery, Rotating Surfboard of Death, Dash to Death, and Mud Butlers.
40	14	"Film Industry vs. Phobics"	Film Industry	December 9, 2004
Challenges include: Get a Piece, Pole Riders, Saddle Sores, and Log Drop.
41	15	"Romance Industry vs. Firearms Industry"	Romance Industry	December 16, 2004
Challenges include: Great Holes of Glory, Dope on a Rope, Skid Markers, and Wall Buggers.
42	16	"Footwear Industry vs. Electronic Gaming Industry"	Footwear Industry	January 6, 2005
Challenges include: Spare Me (Pinheads), Sinkers & Floaters, Chum in the Mouth, and Boulder Dash.
43	17	"Waste Management vs. Advertising"	Tie	January 13, 2005
Challenges include: Bagel Bumpers, Sperm Wheelers, Tumbling Dominoes of Doom, and Rotating Surfboard of Death.
44	18	"Malcontents vs. Baked Goods"	Malcontents	January 20, 2005
Challenges include: Bust-A-Nut, Bird Droppings, Irritable Bowl Syndrome, and Log Drop.
45	19	"Mall Workers vs. Telephone Company"	Mall Workers	February 3, 2005
Challenges include: Eat Shitake, Circle Jerkers, In and Outhouse (Door Jam), and Dope on a Rope.
46	20	"Art World vs. Insurance Industry"	Art World	February 10, 2005
Challenges include: Sinkers & Floaters, Dead End Zone, Hand Job, and Wall Buggers.
47	21	"Seafood Industry vs. High Society"	Seafood Industry	February 17, 2005
Challenges include: Saddle Sores, Hook Line & Swingers, Rotating Surfboard of Death, and Log Drop.
48	22	"Lumber Industry vs. Broadcast News"	Broadcast News	February 24, 2005
Challenges include: Slippery Slope of Slanted Death, Dash to Death, Wall Bangers, and Pole Riders.
49	23	"Postal Service vs. Motor Sports"	Postal Service	March 3, 2005
Challenges include: Dead Letter Zone, Foul Balls, Irritable Bowl Syndrome, and Log Drop.
50	24	"The Courtroom vs. Rodeo Industry"	The Courtroom	March 10, 2005
Challenges include: Crossing the Pee-O Grande, Wall Buggers, Little Man in the Boat, and Clear Sphere of Fear.
51	25	"Sports Women vs. Business Women"	Sports Women	March 17, 2005
Challenges include: Great Holes of Glory, Rotating Surfboard of Death, Irritable Bowl Syndrome, and the Giant G-String of Doom (Hook Line & Swingers).
52	26	"Career Day: White Collar vs. Blue Collar"	White Collar	March 24, 2005
Challenges include: Plank Spankers, Slipped Disks of Doom, Mud Butlers, and Log Drop.
53	27	"Comic Book Industry vs. Personal Hygiene"	Tie	April 7, 2005
Challenges include: Sinkers & Floaters, Highballers (Dirty Muddy Balls), Gang Plankers (Swamp Gassers), and Runaway Stump.

=== Season 4 (2005–06) ===
No. overall	No. in season	Title	Winner	Original release date
54	1	"Desperate Housewives vs. Ultimate Fighters"	Desperate Housewives	October 20, 2005
Challenges include: Take a Leek, Mud Butlers, Sinkers & Floaters, Dash to Death, and Log Drop.
55	2	"Real Mafia vs. Video Game Industry"	Video Game Industry	November 10, 2005
Challenges include: Backyard Bocce Ball Bloodbath, Dope on a Rope, Nerve Racketeering Slabs of Death (Tumbling Dominoes of Doom), Sorry, Wrong Number, and Clear Sphere of Fear.
56–57	3–4	"Most Best of MXC"	TBA	November 17, 2005
A compilation of some of the best and most painful moments of MXC.
58	5	"Country Music Superstars vs. The World of James Bond"	The World of James Bond	December 22, 2005
Challenges include: Endangering Species (Featuring Kenny), Boulder Dash, Elimination Idol (Country Edition), and Pole Riders.
59	6	"Hollywood's Jilted Wives vs. Cheating Husbands (aka The Jens vs. The Brads)"	Cheating Husbands	January 6, 2006
Challenges include: Rotating Surfboard of Death, Pole Riders, Hand Job, and Brass Balls. Note: Some of the footage for Hand Job is reused in this episode.
60	7	"Las Vegas vs. Sesame Street"	Sesame Street	January 12, 2006
Challenges include: Cruelette, Window Pain "Family Edition", "Big" Bird Droppings, and Sinkers & Floaters. Note: Footage for Cruelette is reused in this episode.
61	8	"MXC Wrestling Extravaganza: TNA vs. WWE"	TNA	January 19, 2006
Challenges include: Wall Bangers, Door Jam, Circle Jerkers, and Boulder Dash.
62	9	"Wack Pack vs. Hollywood Rehabbers"	Wack Pack	January 26, 2006
Challenges include: Rotating Surfboard of Death, The Crate Escape, Sperm Wheelers, and Sinkers & Floaters. Note: Footage for The Crate Escape is shown in a reverse angle.
63	10	"Pro Athletes vs. Supermodels (aka Supermodels vs. Steroid Users)"	Pro Athletes	February 2, 2006
Challenges include: Eat Shitake, Spit Ball (Foul Balls), Irritable Bowl Syndrome, and Log Drop.
64	11	"Celebrity Justice vs. TV Motor Shows"	TV Motor Shows	February 9, 2006
Challenges include: Sack Lunch (Bagel Bumpers), Wall Buggers, Little Man in the Boat, and Brass Balls. Note: This is the only episode to use footage of the final battle in almost every episode of Takeshi's Castle, in the drive-by shooting.
65	12	"Tough Guys vs. Chick Flicks"	Chick Flicks	February 16, 2006
Challenges Include: Slippery Slope of Slanted Death, Tumbling Dominoes of Doom, Catch Hell (Dirty Muddy Balls), and Log Drop. Note: Some of the footage for Tumbling Dominoes of Doom is reused in this episode.
66	13	"Hip-Hop vs. Horror Movies"	Hip-Hop	February 23, 2006
Challenges Include: Cheese Squeezers, Runaway Stump, Dash to Death, and Sinkers & Floaters. Notes: 1) This episode features unused footage from the 'Monsters Special' (season 2) in some of the skits. 2) Some of the footage for Runaway Stump is reused in this episode.
67	14	"Mega-Millionaires vs. Where Are They Now?"	Where Are They Now?	March 2, 2006
Challenges include: Great Holes of Glory, Mud Butlers, Ball Busters, and Rotating Surfboard of Death. Note: Footage for Mud Butlers is reused in this episode.
68	15	"NASCAR vs. Box Office Bombs"	Box Office Bombs	March 9, 2006
Challenges include: Drop Dead Line (Hook Line & Swingers), Muddy Runs, Chum in the Mouth, and Battlefelch Earth.

=== Season 5 (2006–07) ===
No. overall	No. in season	Title	Winner	Original release date
69	1	"Stoners vs. Health Nuts (aka Season 5 Sneak Preview)"	Stoners	November 9, 2006
Challenges include: Bagel Bumpers, Wall Bangers, Circle Jerkers, and Brass Balls.
70	2	"Religious Right vs. Gay Rights"	Tie	November 10, 2006
Challenges include: A Mazing Grace, Sinkers & Floaters, Dope on a Rope, and Rotating Surfboard of Death.
71	3	"Superheroes vs. MySpace"	MySpace	November 17, 2006
Challenges include: Slippery Slope of Slanted Death, Dash to Death, Log Drop, and Pole Riders.
72	4	"V.G.A.D.D. Awards: Video Game Industry vs. Video Gamers"	Video Gamers	December 8, 2006
Challenges include: Call of Booty, Window Pain, Mud Butlers, and Clear Sphere of Fear.
73	5	"Sexual Pioneers vs. The World of Violent Films"	Sexual Pioneers	December 15, 2006
Challenges Include: Great Holes of Glory, Log Drop, One and One Makes Number Two (Sorry, Wrong Number), and Irritable Bowl Syndrome. Note: Footage for Great Holes of Glory is reused in this episode.
74	6	"Chick Magnets vs. Famous Felons"	Famous Felons	December 22, 2006
Challenges include: Cut the Cheese (Cheese Squeezers), Sinkers & Floaters, Dead End Zone, and Eat Shitake.
75	7	"Jackass vs. Stand-Up Comics"	Stand-Up Comics	December 29, 2006
Challenges include: Sprayed and Neutered, Boulder Dash, Door Jammed, and Rotating Surfboard of Death.
76	8	"Young and Rich vs. Men's Magazines"	Tie	January 5, 2007
Challenges include: Rump Bumpers, Hand Job, Dash to Death, and Pole Riders.
77	9	"Greenpeace vs. Body Obsessed"	Body Obsessed	January 12, 2007
Challenges include: Survivor: Seamen Island, Log Drop, Ball Busters, and Brass Balls.
78	10	"Hot Chicks of Primetime vs. Hot Celebrity Moms"	Hot Celebrity Moms	January 19, 2007
Challenges include: Pinheads, Sinkers & Floaters, Irritable Bowl Syndrome, and Brass Balls.
79	11	"The White House vs. The World"	The World	January 26, 2007
Challenges include: Wall Bangers, Sinkers & Floaters, Muddy Runs, and Buck Off.
80	12	"People Who Piss Us Off vs. Worst Jobs"	Worst Jobs	February 2, 2007
Challenges include: Tumbling Dominoes of Doom, Wall Buggers, Elimination Idol, and Rotating Surfboard of Death. Notes: 1) This episode features footage of many of the characters of Takeshi's Castle in other occupations, although their real names are not used. 2) Footage for Wall Buggers is reused in this episode.
81	13	"College Sports vs. Mall of Baghdad"	Mall of Baghdad	February 9, 2007
Challenges include: Mud Butlers, Dash to Death, Boulder Dash, and Log Drop.
