= Tomoi =

Tomoi may refer to:

- The Malaysian name for the martial arts style also known as muay Thai
- Tomoi (manga), Japanese manga series by Wakuni Akisato
- Yūsuke Tomoi, Japanese actor
- Fumito Tomoi, Japanese television host
