= Key Hunter =

Japanese television series

Key Hunter (キイハンター, Kī Hantā) is a prime-time Japanese television detective series. It aired on Saturday nights in the 9:00–9:56 p.m. time slot on the Tokyo Broadcasting System (TBS) and its affiliates from April 6, 1968, to April 7, 1973. There were a total of 262 episodes, and it was one of the most popular action dramas in Japan at the time.

The story involved "Key Hunter", a special clandestine unit of the International Police, which endeavored to solve various crimes.

Key Hunter was a unique TV show, which started out as a grand scale spy thriller never before seen in Japan. The episodes were individually themed on global crimes and political strife. The initial hardboiled theme later evolved to include intellectual elements involving action, and occasionally with comical elements as well.

Tetsuro Tanba starred in the 1967 film You Only Live Twice as Japanese Secret Service agent Tiger Tanaka, an ally of James Bond. This role greatly influenced his image in Key Hunter.

== Characters ==
=== Key Hunter ===
- Tetsuya Kuroki (黒木 鉄也, Kuroki Tetsuya) — played by Tetsuro Tanba

ex-intelligence agent

- Keiko Tsugawa (津川 啓子, Tsugawa Keiko) — played by Yōko Nogiwa

ex-intelligence agent

- Ichiro Fubuki (吹雪 一郎, Fubuki Ichirō) — played by Hiroshi Kawaguchi (since episode #60)

ex-FBI agent

- Tatsuhiko Shima (島 竜彦, Shima Tatsuhiko) — played by Hayato Tani

power freak

- Yumi Taniguchi (谷口 ユミ, Taniguchi Yumi) — played by Eiko Ōkawa

memory expert & genius

- Yosuke Kazama (風間 洋介, Kazama Yōsuke) — played by Sonny Chiba

ex-newspaper reporter

=== International Police ===
- Tokubetsu Muraoka (村岡 特別室長, Muraoka Tokubetsu Shitsuchō) — played by Noboru Nakaya (appeared very rarely)

Chief of the Special Task Forces

- Shinji Odagiri (小田切 慎二, Odagiri Shinji) — played by Tadao Nakamaru (since episode #104)
- Shunsuke Dan (壇 俊介, Dan Shunsuke) — played by Hiroshi Miyauchi (since episode #92)

=== Key Hunter Detective Agency ===
- Yuji Taki (滝 祐二, Taki Yuji) — played by Masaya Oki (since episode #210)

young private detective who admires Key Hunter members

== Theme music ==
The theme song "Hijō no License" was written by Shunsuke Kikuchi, played as an instrumental for the opening theme, and sung by Yōko Nogiwa for the ending theme.
