= Takeshi's Castle =

Japanese television game show

Coordinates: 35°34′06″N 139°29′02″E

- Title card
- Starring: Takeshi Kitano; Hayato Tani
- Narrated by: Shizuo Miyauchi; Runpei Masui; Craig Charles (English Version) Javed Jaffrey (Hindi Version Season 1) Bhuvan Bam (Hindi Version Season 2)
- Composers: Tadakazu Onodera; Noriaki Sato
- Country of origin: Japan
- Original language: Japanese
- No. of episodes: 133 (original); 8 (revival)

Production
- Producers: Kunihiko Katsura; Eiichi Misumi
- Running time: 47 minutes
- Production company: TBS

Original release
- Network: JNN (TBS)
- Release: 2 May 1986 – 19 October 1990
- Network: Amazon Prime Video
- Release: 21 April – 28 April 2023

Takeshi's Castle (Japanese: 風雲!たけし城, Hepburn: Fūun! Takeshi-jō) is a Japanese game show that aired between 1986 and 1990 on the Tokyo Broadcasting System (TBS). It features the Japanese comedian Takeshi Kitano (also known as Beat Takeshi) as a count who sets up difficult physical challenges that players (or a volunteer army) must overcome in order to reach him in his castle.

The show became a cult television hit around the world. It was highly influential in global popular culture, inspiring a genre of game shows involving physical challenges and painful entertainment, as well as other media. On 2 April 2005, a special live "revival" was broadcast for TBS's 50th anniversary celebrations. A reboot of the show was released on Amazon Prime Video on 21 April 2023. German-Japanese actor Subaru Kimura joined the returning Tani as co-leader of the contestants.

== Original Takeshi's Castle ==
The original show involved between 86 and 142 contestants whom General Tani (Hayato Tani) "forced" into a series of elimination-style physical challenges, which were similar to those found in It's a Knockout. At the end of each episode, the contestants who survived all challenges faced off directly against Takeshi and his army in one final assault on his castle, with the goal of claiming it for Tani.

The series featured extensive landscaping of a fixed campus at TBS-owned Midoriyama (Green Mountain) Studios in Yokohama, Kanagawa. The setting included large man-made lakes and elaborate permanent obstacles. The final regular episode aired on 14 April 1989, followed by 4 one-off specials until 19 October 1990. A special revival took place just outside the TBS Building for the network's Spring All-Star Thanksgiving Festival on 2 April 2005, featuring Lake of the Dragon God and Gibraltar Strait. In 2004, the website "Takeshi Mania" published an injury list of show participants. The publisher later admitted fabricating the list in an effort to "make a little fun". While minor injuries were reported, few to no major injuries occurred on the show.

=== Challenges ===
A wide range of challenges were used throughout the history of Takeshi's Castle. Depending on their popularity and ease of preparation, some challenges occurred only once or twice, while others took place in virtually every episode. Many challenges involved falling into water or mud upon failure.

- Border Wall – A tall two-faced soapy slope that contestants need to climb. Several ropes are attached the top, which participants can use to climb. Once a contestant makes it over the wall, they slide down the other side into a small trench of water.
- Wall to Freedom Becomes Far – Contestants face ten gates with eight doors. One or two doors are made of paper, while the remaining doors are blocked by wooden plates or consist of paper with a net behind it. Once contestants make it through the tenth wall, they must sift through a large vat of flour to find a colored tennis ball to win the challenge.
- You Can't Continue on an Empty Stomach – Several buns encased in plastic bags are hanging from a rope. To win, contestants must grab onto a bun with their mouth, whilst their arms are affixed to their sides by either an inflatable rubber ring or a large potato sack.
- Boundary Roulette – Contestants must select a disk with various possible descriptions, such as numbers ranging from 0 to 36, "Black," "Red," "Odd," or "Even." Once selected, they sit down at the corresponding spot of a roulette table. A giant roulette wheel is spun, and the outcome of the spin determines who will be eliminated.
- First Fortress – Contestants must climb an extremely narrow and steep staircase holding water pistols, all while ensuring that a paper ring attached to their helmets remains intact from the Takeshi Gundan, who also have water pistols and targets of their own.
- Devil's Domain – A maze composed of either four-sided or six-sided rooms is laid out in a 4x3 rectangle (5x4 when playing with three guards). Contestants navigate the maze while avoiding the guards to reach the goal. Some doors lead to a pool of water that contestants might fall into, constituting a loss.
- Dragon God's Pond – Contestants must cross a lake via approximately twenty-five stones. Some of these stones are affixed to the floor of the lake by only a chain, which sinks when stepped on. In early versions, a variation of Wall to Freedom was placed on the other side of the lake. Contestants must choose one of four doors, two of which are made of paper, while the other two are solid. Breaking through a paper door results in a win.
- Heaven and Hell – Contestants must use a rope to swing across a muddy pit with the goal of landing on a platform. A later version, renamed New Heaven and Hell, required contestants to gain momentum by running down a pathway and then swinging in a semi-circle to land on a platform.
- Beach Boys and Gals – Contestants must ride a surfboard and traverse several obstacles. Originally, contestants jumped over several Styrofoam obstacles (designed to look like an axolotl) and ducked under obstacles (designed to look like a shark's mouth). This challenge was later scrapped and reintroduced as Spinning Beach Boys and Gals, which was played several feet above water with a surfboard attached to a rotating arm. The goal was to stay on the surfboard and reach the finish platform, which was made to look like a tropical island.
- Bridge Over The Battlefield – Contestants must push themselves onto a board, then move along a rolling track to reach an arrow at the end. If they push too hard, they will fall off the track into the water. If their push is too soft, they may undershoot the arrow, and a guard will shove them off the track.
- Revolving Comaneci – The contestant must cross two planks rotating counterclockwise, with one side of the field covered by mattresses that will push the contestant off. As a result, contestants need to reach the center of the plank before continuing.
- Boinging Pompokolin – Contestants are attached to a harness above a mud pit and are pulled along a wire in the air. They must then lower themselves to obtain a ball, which can be thrown into a pot at the end of the mud pit.
- Corinth Pon – Contestants are placed into a transparent ball and pushed down a giant pachinko machine. Their goal is to reach the bottom of the board while avoiding the skull boxes scattered along the board, which would constitute a loss.
- Horse Race Challenge – Contestants wear horse costumes with their feet covered by rollerblades. On the General's signal, contestants must race to the finish line while overcoming three progressively higher hurdles.
- Hello Mr. Turtle – Contestants must cross ten turtle-shaped platforms to reach the finish. After a while, a guard will begin chasing them in an attempt to push contestants off their platforms.
- Sumo Pon – Five sumo wrestlers are shown to the contestants, who will then draw a ball from a box. The ball's color determines who they must defeat in sumo wrestling to win.
- It's an Earthquake Grandpa! – While wearing grey wigs and clothing traditionally worn by Japanese elders, contestants must kneel on a pile of foam blocks and maintain their positions while a small earthquake is simulated in the room.
- Runaway Train of Death – Contestants sit on a mat and are pushed down a sloped track into water. Their aim is to jump onto a lily pad at the sides: a large wobbly one on the left and a smaller but more stable one on the right.
- Thud Calligraphy – Contestants must fire a crossbow onto a small wheel, which determines the Japanese character they need to draw. Using an oversized brush, they have 30 seconds to draw their character on the designated area of a wet slope.
- Adventure Zone – Contestants must overcome an obstacle course akin to a video game while a robot on top of the background structure moves along. Contestants are victorious if they reach the end of the course unless the aforementioned robot finishes first. Should this happen, the contestant is disqualified, and a guard usually throws them into water.
- The Longest Yard – Contestants must carry a football across a playing field while defenders wearing large foam football costumes try to prevent them from doing so. If a contestant is pinned to the ground by a defenders, they lose the round.
- Daruma-San has Fallen Down – Based on a well-known Japanese children's game, contestants must climb a hill while wearing oversized daruma costumes. A guard waits at the top of the hill. His back is turned to the contestants while he chants "だるまさんがころんだ"!After finishing his chant, he turns around. Contestants are disqualified if the guard spots them moving or if they fall down the hill. Reaching the top of the hill signifies victory.
- Flat Chest – While wearing a white bodysuit with velcro on the front, contestants must swing over a lake to stick onto a Velcro wall on the other side.
- Condor Takes Flight – Wearing an oversized hawk costume, contestants are led down a zipline above the ground. Their goal is to catch a plush rabbit midway through with their feet, then throw it onto the nest at the end of the track.
- Roller Game – Contestants must cross a large pond by running over seven rolling pins placed at uneven heights. These pins rotate on an axis, making it difficult for contestants to keep them stationary.
- You Can't Save the Ball – Contestants knock a ball into a giant pachinko machine. They must then grab a bowl, run down a staircase, and wait on a narrow ledge for the ball to reach them, while General Tani gives them directions on where the ball is at the moment. As the ball arrives, they jump into a mud pit to catch it in their bowl.
- Study the Cards Game – While wearing oversized hand costumes, five contestants compete against five of Takeshi's Gundan. At the start of each round, Michiru Jo recites a mathematical problem or a question with a numerical answer. Contestants must determine the correct answer and then fall onto it.
- You Too are Masaru Uno-Kid – While wearing oversized baseball player costumes, contestants must catch a baseball that is being batted in the air. This game is played multiple times with the same group.
- Aquatic Volleyball – Contestants must score three points in a game of volleyball against their opponents. The game takes place on a mat floating on water. They may be faced with three possible opponents: Takeshi's guards, a female volleyball team, or women in swimwear.
- Straits of Gibraltar – General Tani fires a black ball at the contestants, who are standing on a wobbly bridge. Once they catch the ball, the contestants must traverse across the bridge while Takeshi's Gundan fire cannonballs at them. If they successfully catch a golden ball and reach the other side, they receive 1,000 yen.
- You! Sound That Bell! – Contestants are sitting on a mat, then are pushed down a track into the water, with a slanted platform in the center. Once the platform is reached, the contestant must climb the slope in order to ring a bell at the top.
- Gah! I Don't Know! – Contestants sit on a circular disc on a rolling track. They are pushed down the track and shown several signs forming a mathematical problem. When they reach the end of the track, they must state the solution aloud. Answering incorrectly or failing to give an answer causes the end of the track to collapse, dropping the contestant into a tub of flour or, in later versions, mud.
- Star Bowling – Contestants must pick one of ten playing cards (numbered 1 through 10) to determine their position. Contestants are then placed into oversized bowling pin costumes with their ankles taped together. They must remain standing while a large foam bowling ball is rolled at them. If a contestant falls over, they lose.
- Hell Pull – Contestants choose one of five colored ropes, the ends of which are obstructed by a large wall. Contestants will then enter a game with whoever or whatever is holding the opposite end of their rope.
- Ball Run – Contestants must climb a steep slope while Takeshi's guards roll down differently-sized boulders. They can use several gaps in the walls to avoid them, but using a gap causes it to close.
- Stab and Be Stabbed – In a challenge modeled after the popular children's game Pop-up Pirate, contestants sit on a giant barrel and select one of six slots. Michiru Jo slides a sword into the selected slot. Choosing one of the two trapped slots will cause the barrel's top to tip over, which forces the contestant to slide down a slope into a pond. The goal is to pick three slots correctly (four in its first-ever playing).
- Pie Hit Ending – First contestants must throw a die, determined how far away they will be from a series of six holes, which they need to stick their head out of. Once they are settled in, a professional will throw a pie at them, with the contestant winning if the pie misses.
- Ladder Lottery of Difficult Times – Contestants must choose one of five doors, then follow the path until they reach a junction akin to a ghost leg. Once they reach the end of the path, they must climb a set of stairs and descend down a slide. If they choose the correct slide, they will slide into safety. An incorrect choice drops them into mud.
- Combinations of Love – Played in pairs, contestants must choose between even or odd. While wearing oversized dice costumes, they are rolled down a slope one at a time, and the sum of the two dice rolls must correspond with whichever option the couple chose at the beginning.
- You Jumped, Congratulations! – Contestants must pole vault over a pond from a high platform to land onto a small platform.
- Dash Over the Mud, Youth – Simulating a baseball game, the pitcher throws a ball that the batter purposely misses. Once the catcher catches the ball, contestants must run from first to second base while traversing a large strand of mud to avoid being tagged out.
- Rush Out, Youth! – Contestants wait behind saloon doors in front of a mud pit. On the General's whistle, Michiru Jo shoots a soccer ball in the air, and the contestants must run into the mud pit to catch the ball.
- Man Eating Holes – The penultimate challenge for most of the series run. The contestants must jump into one of five large holes in the ground, two of which are being guarded by either Makoto Dainenji or Katsuo Tokashiki, and the last three leading to Takeshi's castle. Usually, Dainenji and Tokashiki are dressed in costumes and perform a skit prior to the game's start.

=== Final Battle ===
In early episodes, the contestants stormed the castle in a short-range water gun assault. Later episodes introduced carts with paper rings and eventually lasers and light-sensitive targets. If the contestant's gun penetrated the paper ring or hit the sensor on Takeshi's cart (which was defended by weapons such as a large water gun and a laser-armed plane), Takeshi's cart would deactivate, and the castle was "taken," and the game won. During the water-gun version, if Takeshi was defeated, all surviving players split the prize between them. In the laser-gun version, the player who stopped Takeshi won 1 million yen (which, at the time, was roughly equivalent to US$8,000 or £5,000 sterling).

In the Amazon Prime reboot, the finale game "Yabusame" had the remaining contestants playing against BANANAMAN, Lord Ueda, Lord Neomi, Lord Watanabe, and kickboxer Tenshin Nasukawa, who played on Count Takeshi's behalf. The contestant rides across a track in a pod firing tennis balls into the funnel of their opponent's pod. The defender of the castle shoots back at the paper target on the contestant's pod with larger balls. If the castle defender breaks the contestant's paper target, the contestant is out. If a player lands a ball in the funnel of the defender, the contestant wins a million yen. If nobody is defeated, it is considered a draw with no victories.

=== Music ===
Takeshi's Castle challenges used a wide variety of well-known songs from movies, television shows, video games, anime, and other sources.

=== Characters ===
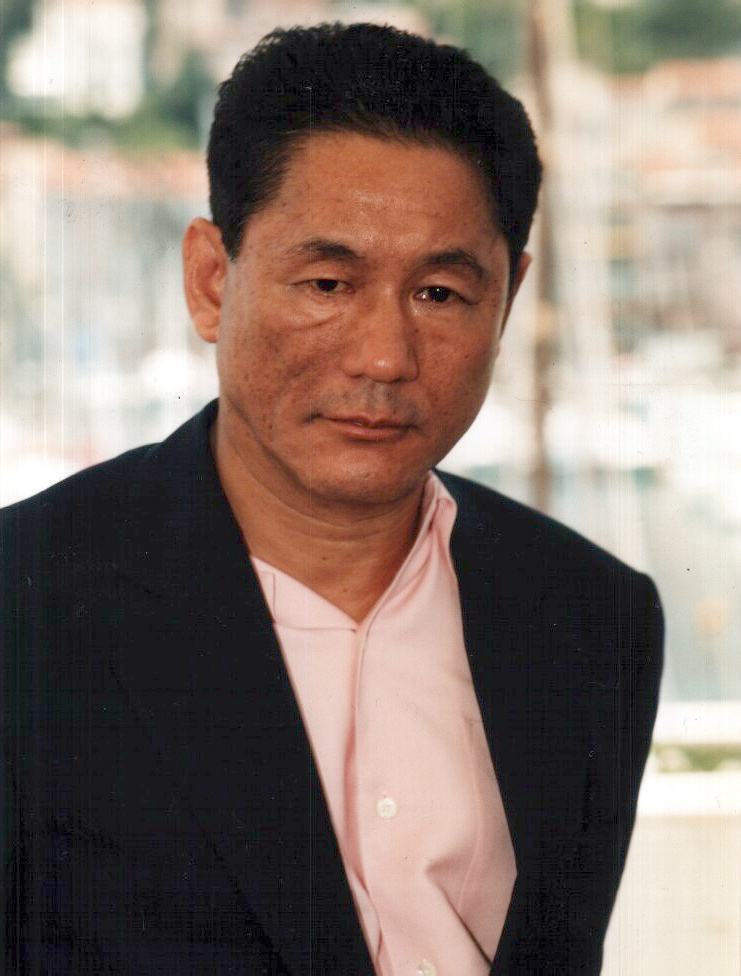
Kitano at the Cannes Film Festival in 2000

- Count "Beat" Takeshi (ビートたけし; Kitano, born 18 January 1947) – The lord of his castle and eventual target of the competition. He also made commentary on the events.
- Takeshi Doll – During a prolonged period when Takeshi was forbidden to appear on television (his punishment for an act of violence against reporters and photographers from a scandal magazine), one of the Takeshi Gundan filled in by wearing his robe and a giant paper-mâché Takeshi head, similar to ones worn by sports team mascots.
- Saburo Ishikura (石倉三郎, born 16 December 1946) – Chief Retainer of Takeshi's Castle. He provided commentary alongside Takeshi.
- Sonomanma Higashi (real name Hideo Higashikokubaru, born 16 September 1957) – Originally leader of the Takeshi Gundan. He replaced Ishikura as the advisor of the Takeshi's castle in the middle of the series run.
- Takeshi's Gundan (Defense Troops) (たけし軍団) – The Count's guards, seen in the Kart Battle and other challenges, who wore white or green. When Higashi became Takeshi's new advisor, Omori Utaemon took over as the leader. Other members included Matsuo Bannai, Tsumami Edamame, Yurei Yanagi, Rakkyo Ide, Great Gidayu, Dankan, Third Nagasima, Rusher Itamae, Taka Guadalcanal, Hakase Suidobashi, Sintarou Mizushima and "Loyal" Tadajij Kikuchi.
- General Tani (Hayato Tani) (谷隼人, born 9 September 1946) Led the contestants through the challenges set by Count Takeshi. His real-life wife, Kikko Matsuoka (born 11 February 1947), appeared in an episode resulting in a comedic conflict between the couple.
- Tani's Assistant – On international specials (involving non-Japanese players), General Tani was assisted by Eliska Nochelli who served as his translator. Chuck Wilson also acted as his assistant in two international specials.
- Junji Inagawa (also known as Jyunji Inagawa) (稲川淳二, born 9 September 1946), Akira Sakamoto (born 31 July 1949), and Shingo Yanagisawa (柳沢慎吾, born 6 March 1962) – Three of the Battlefield Reporters however there were many more. They usually wore safari outfits.
- Kibaji Tankobo (丹古母鬼馬二, born 4 January 1950) and Shozo "Strong" Kobayashi (ストロング金剛, 25 December 1940 – 31 December 2021) – Two physically imposing guards most famous for featuring in the "Devil's Domain" challenge. Kibaji usually wore a long red wig, while Strong was bald, and they painted their faces to further intimidate contestants. In addition to frightening and chasing the contestants in the "Devil's Domain", Tankobo and Kobayashi also smeared black, sticky paint all over the contestants that they caught in the maze. Tankobo and Kobayashi were considered to be two of Takeshi's finest henchmen.
- Brad Lesley, a.k.a. "Animal" (亜仁丸レスリー, 11 September 1958 – 27 April 2013) – American baseball player. His main job was to humiliate and frighten the contestants in any possible way, usually dressed as a samurai, complete with a sword. Animal has also been seen in a green sumo suit, spider costume, Fred Flintstone–style outfit, a baseball uniform and a Las Vegas–era Elvis Presley jumpsuit costume.
- Michiru Jo (城みちる, born 18 November 1957) – One of the few guards to have been involved from the very first episode and until the show finished, he normally wore a distinctive pink outfit. Jo was a Japanese pop singer in the 1970s.
- Yoroi/Ritter Chuu – He was a sixteen-foot tall samurai who tried to keep players from reaching the goals in several games.
- Makoto Dainenji (大念寺誠; born 1 February 1949) and Katsuo Tokashiki (渡嘉敷勝男, born 27 July 1960) – Makoto, a karate master, and Katsuo, a boxing champion in Japan, were the "Man Eating Holes" guards, usually wearing outrageous costumes. Katsuo also served as the referee in the "Sumo Pong" game.
- Masanori Okada (岡田正典, born 19 October 1953) – Usually seen in the game "Bridge on the Battlefield", he would jump out of the water to push the contestants into the drink if they failed to reach the target. Okada also played in the "Devil's Domain" and other games as well. Also known as the "Sea Goblin" in Japan and was a boxer in the 1970s.
- Umanosuke Ueda, (上田馬之助, 20 June 1940 – 21 December 2011) – This aggressive guard, a former wrestler in real life, appeared in "Devil's Domain", "Sumo Pong", "The Longest Yard" and "Gibraltar Strait".
- Youshichi Shimada (島田洋七, born 10 February 1950) – A guard who was usually seen in the games "Drama-San is falling Down" in overalls akin to those worn by Dennis the Menace, and in "Rotating Beach Boys & Gals" dressed as a female Native American nicknamed "Pocahontas" who would push contestants into the water if they missed the surfboard.
- Shoji Kinoshita and Shoichi Kinoshita – Better known as "Popcorn" (ポップコーン, born 1 January 1959), these identical twin actors, well-known in Japan, were commonly seen wearing rainbow ponchos and bowler hats. They also wore baseball uniforms and other humorous costumes, appearing in the game "Donbura Koko" where they would try and put the contestants off by singing a very annoying chant "Donbura, Donbura, Donbura" as well as "Gibraltar Strait" and other games.
- Shinoburyo (忍竜, born 19 July 1951) – Sumo wrestler in Japan who appeared in the game "Sumo Pong".
- Large Fuji (26 August 1958 – 14 October 2012) – Replaced Shinoburyo in the later episodes as the purple sumo fighter in "Sumo Pong".
- Konishiki Doll – Only seen in "Sumo Pong" and once in "Pulling Hell". The Konishiki Doll was one of the Defense Troops dressed in a large costume which is meant to resemble Konishiki Yasokichi, one of the largest sumo wrestlers to ever live.
- Noboru "Shin" Suganuma (すがぬま伸, born 5 July 1952) – Loyal member of Takeshi's Gundan, who wore red and who was a pathetic sumo wrestler in "Sumo Pong".
- Ritsuko Nakayama (中山 律子, 12 October 1942 – 7 November 2026) – Also known as Refreshing Ritsuko-Ritsuko, she is a professional bowler in Japan who appeared in the "Star Bowling" game.
- Yutaka Enatsu (15 May 1948 – 17 November 2026) – A real-life Japanese baseball player, he made a guest appearance as the pie thrower in "Pie End-Hit" in a single episode.
- "Ordinary" Oki Bondo (大木凡人, born 1 July 1949) – The emcee of the karaoke bar in the "Street Corner TV" game.
- Koji Sekiyama (関山耕司, 22 May 1924 – 27 April 2013) – Karaoke bar owner who decided whether contestants' singing was good enough to progress through to the next round. Later replaced by Nobuo Yana.
- Nobuo Yana (born 13 August 1935) – Replaced Koji Sekiyama as the karaoke bar owner later in the series and decided whether a contestant had sung well enough to progress through to the next round.
- Takayuki Yokomizo (born 2 August 1963) – Bouncer in the karaoke bar who violently withdrew contestants from the building if Sekiyama (later Yana) decided that their singing was not good enough.
- Geisha Girls or Bunny Girls – Led by Miyuki Ono, they helped contestants in several games and also helped Takeshi and his advisor in comedy skits. Other known girls included Harumi Tomikawa, Mika, Mina Morishima, Sawada, and Mitsumi Yokota. Sometimes, when Junji and Shingo were off the show for other commitments, one of them served in the Battlefield Reporter's role.
- Shizuo Miyauchi (宮内鎮雄, 24 January 1945 – 14 January 2022) – Commentator for the original series in Japan. Retired from TBS in 2005 after working as a commentator for several decades.
- Ultraman – Appeared in the show on several occasions. The first was to help the young contestants through a number of the challenges in the "Kids Only" special. The second was as a replacement for General Tani (for unknown reasons). The third occasion was in the "Monster Special", along with other members of the "Ultra Brothers". (Due to a licensing dispute, the "Monster Special" episode of the American version MXC was heavily edited upon its release on DVD, with all Ultraman characters removed.)

=== Character counterparts ===
| Original Japanese version | American version (MXC) | Philippine version | UK version | Spanish version | Indian version | Vietnamese version |
|---|---|---|---|---|---|---|
| Count "Beat" Takeshi/ Takeshi Doll | Vic Romano/Uncool Not-so-Hip Vic Romano/Zeppo the Waterhead | Master Takeshi | Count Takeshi/Man In The Paper Mache Head | Takeshi/Mini Takeshi | Count Takeshi | Lãnh chúa Takeshi |
| Sonomanma Higashi | Kenny Blankenship | Bisita I | | Junior | Chotu | |
| Hayato Tani | Captain Tenneal | Master Kapitan | General Lee (original/revival (Sometimes))/General Tani (revival) | Napoleon (1990–95)/General Tani (2006–07) | General Lee | Tướng quân Shakrito |
| Junji Inagawa | Guy LeDouche | | The Man with the Toffee Apple | Pepe Livingstone | Shikari Shambhu | |
| Michiro Jo | Danny Glans/Jimmy Junk/Sugar Ramos Phiss/Golden Shower Boy/Barry Sosa/Spin | | Captain Japan/Cowardly Custard | Pinky Winky | Choos Lee | |
| Popcorn | Em on Em/Babe and Ruth/Bud and Pud/Green Gobblers (Hedda and Choda)/Jesse and Jackson/Huff and Huff | | The Rainbow Warriors/Japanese Thompson Twins/Pop & Corn(sometimes) | Duo Pirata | Changu Mangu | |
| Tani's Assistant/Chuck Wilson | Pey'once/Howie Dean | Bisita II | Corporal Kirsty | General Tano | Chotu | |
| Yoroi Chuu/Jumbo Max | Skanky/Fisty | Boy Kamao | Boxing Monster/Honey Monster | Pequeño Samurai | Ravan | |
| Youshi Shimada | Chief Otto Parts/Professor G Spot/Professor N. Marian/Marty | Boy Tulak | Dennis The Menace/Pocahontas | Chuky/Muchahontas | Pocahontas/ Semu Singh | |
| | | | Craig Charles | Juan Herrera & Miguel Ángel Coll (1990–95)/Fernando Costilla & Paco Bravo (2006–07) | Javed Jaffrey | |

== International versions ==
=== Arab countries ===
In Arab countries the show was called Al Hisn (Arabic: الحصن, lit. 'The Fort'). It originally aired in the mid to late 1980s where it became a cult hit. The show was syndicated to multiple TV stations across different countries, which was a common practice at the time for localized foreign programs. Various public stations re-run the show on non-specific occasions. Other than the voice-over commentary and the opening/closing themes, the episodes were largely retained as originally aired in Japan. The commentary was provided by Lebanese television personality Riad Sharara, then later by Jamal Rayyan. The Arabic version was produced and distributed by Amman-based company Middle East Art Production and Distribution (الشرق الأوسط للإنتاج والتوزيع الفني).

In 2017 the Saudi Arabian Sports Authority signed a contract with TBS to build a Saudi-inspired Takeshi's castle in Riyadh, the first episode of which aired on 25 September 2019 on MBC 1.

=== Australia ===
An edit of the show was produced by The Comedy Channel. It had hosts in the local studio and was redubbed. This has since been cancelled and/or finished. The show was hosted by two housemates from series two of Australian Big Brother Shannon Cleary and Nathan Morris. It also featured a crossdressing Geisha girl named Beryl. Some episodes featured a special guest third host, including Greg Fleet. Highlights appeared in Australia on the television program World's Weirdest TV. The American version MXC currently airs on Fox8 (an Australian cable network). The Australian writer and critic Clive James was once a celebrity contestant on the original show.

=== Brazil ===
Starting on 19 November 1989, a version was aired by Rede Globo, called Olimpíadas do Faustão (Portuguese for "Faustão's Olympics"), as an insert in Fausto Silva's Sunday-afternoon variety show Domingão do Faustão. In 1994, rival SBT copied that version, and a legal action by Globo and SBT stopped the broadcasting. On 1 June 2008, SBT Keshi remake reappeared on TV, now licensed, remaking Faustão's known games (as Bridge Ball and The Run Way), not-seen in Globo games (as Skittles and Ride the Wave), and original games (cross a balance beam after spin, or cross a small bridge using a crank-kart). The games are a segment named "Gincana" in the Programa Silvio Santos.

=== Czech Republic ===
It was shown by the name Takešiho hrad (Czech), with comedic voice-over by two Czech comedians. The commentary was mostly fictional. The show was popular among young viewers. The Czech TV channel also broadcast the show to Slovak Republic where it gained some popularity as well. In 2011 was Takešiho hrad broadcast on channel Prima Cool with a new single-voice commentary.

=== Denmark ===
The Danish TV station TV 2 Zulu bought the rights to air the Challenge version in Denmark, thus making the Danish broadcast identical to that in Britain.

=== Finland ===
On 7 January 2008, the television channel Jim started airing the UK version of the program. The comments are subtitled in Finnish. The show is titled Hullut japanilaiset (The Crazy Japanese)

=== France ===
A shortened version given a comedic voiceover by comedians Vincent Desagnat and Benjamin Morgaine has been shown on the W9 TV channel since October 2006, in a program called Menu W9 (which also presented a shortened version of Sushi TV on its first season, now replaced by Sasuke). It has been also broadcast on the channel M6 which shown 2 episodes per day at 6.50 p.m from Tuesday to Friday. The voices were those of the late sport presenter Thierry Roland and Moon Dailly.

=== Germany ===
A dubbed version of the show aired on DSF in 1999. This version was released on a DVD box set with 12 selected episodes. Two more volumes were planned but were presumably canceled. A German dubbed version of the 2002 UK edit airs from 3 July 2007, on RTL II. There also exists an adaptation called Entern oder Kentern (engl.: Board or Capsize) with almost the same games but pirates as antagonists and celebrities as Team Captains. This version was aired on RTL in summer 2007. Shorter versions of episodes with comical commentary air on Comedy Central.

=== Greece ===
A version aired from 2005 to 2009 on Skai TV by the name Το κάστρο του Τακέσι (Takeshi's Castle). It has been dubbed by Kostas Papageorgiou and Akindynos Gkikas.

=== Hungary ===
In early 2022, the Hungarian version of Comedy Central started to broadcast the Indonesian show, redubbed with stand-up comedians Péter Elek and Péter Janklovics who tend to know nothing about the aim of the game, thus strengthen the funny circumstances of the show just like in the Czech version. However, after the premiere, repeats are aired in CET nighttime only.

=== India ===
A shortened version of the show aired on Pogo on 1 March 2005, with Hindi commentary by Jaaved Jaaferi. Jaaferi's commentary was praised for its humour, and this increased the show's popularity. It additionally featured guest commentators such as Raju Srivastav, Sunil Pal, Navin Prabhakar, and Ahsaan Qureshi. The show aired on Pogo until January 2019.

Amazon Prime Video's 2023 reboot of Takeshi's Castle was released on 2 November 2023, featuring the voice of Bhuvan Bam as his character "Titu Mama" from BB Ki Vines, taking over as the new commentator, replacing Jaaved Jaaferi. Bhuvan spent four months dubbing and writing the script for the show, with some promotional videos filmed in September.

=== Indonesia ===
The original Japanese show was being re-broadcast (with Indonesian dubs) on RCTI from December 1989 to December 1992, TPI from 2002 to 2007 (with most reruns) and GTV in 2013 and 2014. In 2017, MNCTV acquired the license to remake the show which was later known as Takeshi's Castle Indonesia (a.k.a. Benteng Takeshi Indonesia) with a grand prize of IDR 100.000.000,-. After two successful seasons, the show was originally planned to enter its third season in 2018; however, due to a drug case involving Reza Bukan (the cast of King Takeshi at that time) the launch of the third season was delayed until mid-2019.

The main cast of Takeshi's Castle Indonesia includes Fero Walandouw (as the Captain), Nabila Putri, Poppy Sovia, and Desy JKT48 (as Vice-Captains in Season 1, 2, and 3 respectively), Lee Jong Hoon (as the Reporter), and Reza Bukan and Kenta (as King Takeshi in season 1–2 and 3 respectively).

=== Iran ===
It was aired by the name Masir-e Talaa'ee (Persian: مسیر طلایی) (when translated it means "Golden Path"), on Iran's Channel 3 in 2009 and 2010. It was hosted by Morteza and Mostafa Hosseini, the brothers of the refugee host Mohammad Hosseini.

=== Italy ===
Renamed Mai dire Banzai (Never Say: Banzai!) it first aired in 1989 on Italia 1. A reedited version interspersed with clips of another Japanese gameshow called Za Gaman, it was given a comedic voiceover by Gialappa's Band, who changed Kitano's and Saburo Ishikura's names to Gennaro Olivieri and Guido Pancaldi, historically Swiss Italian judges in Games Without Frontiers. They also renamed in absurdist comical ways the other figures of the show like calling the in-game reporter 'Pokoto Pokoto', the huge-headed fake Takeshi being called 'Mashiro Tamigi', the martially-attire'd host 'General Putzerstofen' and so on. Gialappa's Band making fun of the duty-bound, stoic stereotype of Japan, described the games and tasks as traditional Japanese past-times and thus rather mundane and humdrum by Japanese standards, introducing a veil of non-sequitur to the show which is lacking in English language versions.

The show gained new popularity in the 2000s, when it started being broadcast on various satellite and terrestrial channels with the original title and using the half-hour episodes of the UK shortened version, with independent voiceover (superimposed to the still audible Japanese track) done by various Italian comedians. As of 2008, this version is broadcast on GXT with the voiceover done by Trio Medusa (previously the show was commentated on by Marco Marzocca with Stefano Sarcinelli and still before by duo Lillo & Greg); shortly after it was re-aired by local broadcasters and by K2. From 10 January 2011, the series is re-transmitted in Italy on Cartoon Network and the voiceover is done by Roberto Stocchi and Francesca Draghetti.

=== Lithuania ===
The show was aired by the name Takeši pilis, featuring Fumito Tomoi (a Japanese person living in Lithuania at the time), who dubbed the show in a comic way with his broken Lithuanian. The show was very popular.

=== Malaysia ===
The Japanese version was aired over NTV7 in early 2000s, although edited to be shortened to half an hour. The broadcast was added with Malay overdub commentary (the original Japanese audio track is still audible in background). Sometimes in earlier versions, the parts that were not overdubbed are subtitled in Malay. The show was known as Istana Takeshi in Malaysia.

As of June 2010, the show is airing again using the American version with Malay subtitles on TV9 but still called Istana Takeshi instead of MXC, but as 2024 TV3 airing American version with Malay subtitles on 5.30pm Malaysia time.

On 7 March 2026, this show will airing for this programme with Malay subtitles on Astro Ria but still called Istana Takeshi instead of MXC or Most Extreme Elimination Challenge for double episodes back to back on Saturday at 6:00 pm – 7:00 pm.

=== Mexico ===
The Japanese version on Azteca 13 of TV Azteca in 1993 and Azteca 7 of TV Azteca was aired in Mexico, which, like the Spanish, has its own stories and invented by giving voices teams.

Due to the success of the American edits of Banzuke and Ninja Warrior/Sasuke on Azteca 7, on 4 May 2015, the program was broadcast by Canal 5 of Televisa, under the name Castillo Takeshi and narrated by two presenters from Televisa using the British edit as basis for their own edit. Possibly due to the upscaling from PAL to HD, it had a poor quality image, making it look even older than it was. It took the time slot where ABC's Wipeout had been broadcast since 2014. After just three weeks, the show was replaced by ABC's Wipeout, which has had a longer more successful run on Mexican TV.

=== Netherlands ===
The British cut of the show aired on 15 August 2009, on Comedy Central, with Dutch voice-over provided by sports commentator Ronald van Dam and actor/comedian Ruben van der Meer.

Takeshi's Castle Thailand in its UK format commenced airing on 22 March 2018, with commentary by actress/singer Katja Schuurman and vocalist Pepijn Lanen.

=== Philippines ===
It was first shown on IBC in 1990 as a Filipino-dubbed show. Later episodes contained interludes shot on a studio with actors Anjo Yllana as Takesh and Smokey Manoloto as "Iwakura" providing the commentary with a gravelly Japanese accent, which was later dropped in favor of their natural voices. The Filipino production crew also developed on their relationship, with Iwakura often trying to trick Takeshi on several occasions. One episode which resulted in the contestants' victory was even written as Takeshi's worst nightmare; when Iwakura finally wakes him up, Takeshi is so traumatized that he asks to call off a scheduled taping. Makers of the malt drink brand Ovaltine created an in-show mini contest as part of a product endorsement deal in 1991. In this version, the names given to most of the challenges are translated from their original Japanese such as "Devil's Maze" for the Honeycomb and Square Mazes, "Flying Mushroom" for Mushroom Trip, and "Sumo Wrestling" for Sumo Rings.

The IBC episodes of Takeshi's Castle were later rerun on SBN during 1993 and 1994. The show was not edited as before at IBC.

Takeshi's Castle enjoyed a revival in the Philippines on 2 October 2006. This time around, comedians Joey de Leon and Ryan Yllana (Anjo's younger brother) provide the commentary as fictional characters shogun Shintaro "Taru" Gokoyami who is Takeshi's right-hand man and sumo wrestler Kakawate Takehome, the leader of the Takeshi Gundan, fictional in the sense that there are no such characters in the original cast. Initially, the two provide play-by-play commentary, but they as well as some added characters reduced themselves to skits and commentary in between clips of the show. Later, as part of Q's first anniversary, Anjo finally appeared alongside the new cast, reprising his role as "prince" Takeshi.

Due to Takeshi's Castle's competitive ratings, the management of GMA Network decided to move the show from QTV in an evening slot, now to the early afternoon weekend slot of GMA. Takeshi's Castle was aired on a weekly basis as opposed to the weekdays airing on Q, and was aired before Eat Bulaga on Saturdays and before SOP on Sundays. This was done to increase and improve the ratings of the succeeding shows. Takeshi's Castle started to air on GMA on 23 December 2006, with same hosts. The show aired its last episode on 9 May 2007, and after a long break of TV experience, Joey and Ryan assumed new personalities as Master GT (later Tirso Potter) and Captain B respectively. It was temporarily replaced by Just Joking which starred also Joey De Leon and Ryan Yllana and other casts. On 13 August 2007, Takeshi's Castle returned on air once again with all new episodes and Mike "Pekto" Nacua (Cookie), John Feir (Belli) and Love Añover (replacement when either Cookie or Belli was not in) become commentators. The show aired at Saturdays 11:30 a.m. before Eat Bulaga!, and Sundays 11:15 a.m. before SOP Rules.

On GMA's regional networks, a Cebuano-dubbed show aired on GMA Cebu and Davao from Saturdays and Sundays in the morning titled Takeshi's Castle Wala Gyud sa Isaysay Banzai! (Never Say Banzai!).

=== Portugal ===
A version called Nunca Digas Banzai (Portuguese for "Never Say Banzai", based on the Italian name for it, Mai Dire Banzai) aired on SIC starting in 1994, where it reached some popularity. Voiceovers were provided by two hosts, José Carlos Malato and João Carlos Vaz. Takeshi and Ishikura were renamed "Fujimoto" and "Fujicarro" (a play on the Portuguese words for "[motor]bike" and "car" using the Japanese word Fuji), and the Portuguese hosts made no attempt to interpret the reality of the show, instead using the contestants as surrogates for the satirical comments about Portuguese public figures, in a similar style to MXC.

=== Russia ===
The series were featured in Ren TV project show The Best Shows of the World (Лучшие шоу мира) in the early 2000s and due to positive public reaction were aired on the regular basis on its own, named Takeshi Kitano's Castle (Замок Такеши Китано). Show was translated and aired on 2x2 channel as "Japanese amusements" (Японские забавы) during 2011–2012 and again in 2013 and 2014. The format of the show is the translated commentary version of UK adaptation.

Secondly, in 2020 – show Gold of Gelendzhik (Золото Геленджика) aired on ТНТ channel, based on Takeshi Kitano's Castle format. The action of this show takes place in the resort town of Gelendzhik in the Krasnodar Territory on the Black Sea coast. The rules of the game and challenges are similar to the original Japanese show, but with some changes, in particular, the Final Challenge was borrowed from another Japanese show in which participants need to climb slippery stairs and take the prize.

=== Serbia ===
Show started with showing on FOX TV in January 2010 named Takeši.

=== Singapore ===
The show debuted in 1993 on Singapore's free-to-air channel, Channel 8. This show started in 2025 on Mediacorp Suria

=== Slovakia ===
During 2011 and 2012, it was Takešiho hrad broadcast on channel Joj Plus with a single-voice Slovak commentary.

=== South Africa ===
The show was broadcast daily on the Sony MAX channel, Channel 128 on DStv. It was the condensed version of the original series with commentary provided by Craig Charles. It began broadcasting in 2009 and was a huge hit with viewers. Due to its popularity the show has been aired to a broader audience on SABC 2.

=== Spain ===
The program aired in the 1990s as Humor amarillo (when translated it means "Yellow Humour" or "Yellow Comedy") on TV channel Telecinco. Comedians Juan Herrera and Miguel Ángel Coll (son of José Luis Coll) commented on the images; this version of the show has achieved cult status and there are some fansites and web petitions for returns. In fact, the Spanish version created some terms now familiar to either Takeshi's Castle or Humor amarillo, like "El Laberinto del Chinotauro" (literally The Chinesetaur Labyrinth, name for any of the maze challenges), "Los Cañones de Nakasone" (parody of "Guns of Navarone" Spanish title), "Las Zamburguesas" (for Skipping Stones),"Gacela Thompson" ("Thompson Gazelle"), a pathetic businessman character, and "Chino Cudeiro" (the Chinese Cudeiro, as the name started to be assigned when appeared a player with a red T-shirt with the inscription "Cudeiro, Galicia, España"), the name assigned to a random player that always "dies", one of the most popular characters in Spain.

On 28 January 2006, a second version dubbed by Fernando Costilla and Paco Bravo premiered on Spanish TV channel Cuatro. They have shown every one of the original Japanese episodes, with the last one being shown on 9 June 2007, ending with a special message by the Spanish commentators. The 2006 version is currently being rebroadcast on the Telecinco-owned channel Energy.

These two versions had in common that it was naturally assumed that the dubbing was completely unrelated to the original dialogues, to the point that sometimes the references to the actual contest were really few. The commentators could turn the contestants into mushroom seekers, or people looking for a new apartment. Alongside the spectacular hits suffered by the contestants and the show's peculiar aesthetic, this helped boost its popularity.

=== Taiwan ===
A version called 100 Wars, 100 Victories (Chinese: 百戰百勝) on CTS and was based on the original series. It featured four teams competing for small prizes in games.

=== Thailand ===
Takeshi's Castle was dubbed and shown on Channel 5 between 1988 and 1995. The title was changed to Hod, Mun, Ha (โหด มัน ฮา), or "Cruel, Thrilling, Fun".

In 2007, the unedited original series with bilingual soundtrack (Thai & Japanese) was aired on X-ZYTE channel on TrueVisions cable TV every Sunday and rerun several times throughout a week.

In 2014, Channel 7 (Thailand) and Heliconia H Group bought the rights to remake the show. "โหด มัน ฮา Takeshi's Castle Thailand" first aired on 20 July, with a new episode airing most Sundays. The show's format is identical to the one used in the original show, but with a few minor changes. Shogun Takeshi (Note Chernyim) has kept Princess Woosenko (Woonsen Virithipa Pakdeeprasong) as a prisoner in his castle. General Shahkrit (Shahkrit Yamnarm) attempts to rescue the princess from the castle by sending his army of contestants through Shogun's challenges (remade challenges include Slippery Wall, Avalanche, Honeycomb Maze, Skipping Stones, Slip Way, Sumo Rings, Wet Paint, and Tug Of War), and the last remaining contestants battle against Shogun's guards in the Showdown. Any winners receive the 1,000,000 Thai-baht cash prize, the cash prize is rolled over to the next episode if there are no winners.

Later on, the show reduced the number of competitors to 20, and then 12 in current shows. With the rules format changing, the competitors don't get eliminated throughout the show, but instead work as a team. The competitors are given, by Shogun Takeshi, 10 carts and the Shogun has no guard carts at the beginning of the episode. The competitors then play 5 challenges before the Showdown. In the first challenge, usually involved all the competitors playing at the same time, every single competitors must pass the challenge, while the subsequent challenges needs at most 5 passes to be credited as a win. Winning a challenge will cause the situation remaining unchanged, while losing the first challenge takes one cart away from the competitors team and one cart added to Shogun's team in Showdown. In subsequent challenges, one car is taken away and added to Shogun's team if less than 5 competitors passed, two cars are taken if less than 3 competitors passed. In current shows, with 12 competitors, two cars are taken away if less than 3 competitors passed, while 3 passes are credit with a win, and no cars are taken away. Losing a challenge also results in a punishment for the competitors in various ways, usually messy and painful. In Showdown, the team sends out two competitors per one cart they have to battle with Shogun's guards. Succeeding in Battle awards all competitors a share of 5,000,000 baht cash prize, but the prize is remain the same in all episodes.

=== Turkey ===
The Turkish version of the show was in development.

=== Ukraine ===
The show was aired on QTV channel as Laughter with Takeshi Kitano (Реготня з Такеші Кітано) during 2008–2010.

=== United Kingdom ===
==== Tarrant on TV (late 1980s) ====
The show was first introduced to British audiences in the late 1980s, when it was featured semi-regularly as part of LWT's Tarrant on TV, in which broadcaster Chris Tarrant showcased a variety of unusual television programmes from around the world. One of the series' previous hosts, Clive James, appeared in an original Japanese episode as an international contestant – with behind the scenes footage shown as part of his two-part ITV documentary ...in Japan in 1987.

==== Challenge version (2002–2004) ====
Takeshi's Castle would become better known later when a condensed version of the original series, commentated by Craig Charles, premiered on Challenge on 9 November 2002, regularly dominating the top ten programmes on the channel each week.

The UK format did not follow the original Japanese format – instead presenting each sequence of games as comic martial challenges leading to the final game wherein remaining contestants tried to storm the Castle. A typical episode of the Challenge format of Takeshi's Castle had about eight games, followed by the Final Showdown. After each challenge, a 'Ridiculous Replay' was shown, highlighting the most entertaining attempt. Challenge edited out the comedy sketches in the original Japanese version to allow more games to be shown during the half-hour block. During the series, Charles coined the term "Keshi Heads" to describe avid fans of the show.

More series were commissioned and shown over the next few months, culminating in a series of hour-long specials in the Autumn of 2003, and a special highlights show, The A-Z of Takeshi's Castle, broadcast on 1 January 2004, which showed some of the best clips of the best games as the last original series finale. On 3 September 2005, MXC aired for the first time in the UK on Challenge.

On 9 May 2007, The Paul O'Grady Show had their own mini Takeshi's Castle challenge, including 'Knock Knock', 'Bite the Bun', a "Bridge Ball" adaptation called 'Balancing Act' and the 'Slippery Wall'. The UK TV series returned to Challenge after a hiatus on 7 September 2009 with a modified opening sequence (to fit with Flextech rebranding to Virgin Media Television).

==== Takeshi's Castle Rebooted (2013) ====
In February 2010, a campaign was launched by fansite Keshi Heads in an attempt to bring a brand new series of Takeshi's Castle to Challenge within its tenth anniversary year on the channel (November 2012–13). It was suggested by campaigners that these new episodes would feature never-before-seen games (previously completely cut from other episodes), and feature five Japanese episodes new to the UK, including the Pilot and an International Special which have never been seen on TV since their original airings in Japan.

On 13 December 2012, Challenge announced that they had signed a deal for "unseen bits of Takeshi's Castle". The new series, named Takeshi's Castle Rebooted, which aired from 8 to 29 March 2013, featured games and episodes suggested by the Keshi Heads website in their campaign. Despite Craig Charles agreeing to return for the new series, Challenge brought in Richard McCourt and Dominic Wood (Dick and Dom) as the new voiceovers. Hayato Tani also filmed presentation links for the new series.

==== Comedy Central revival (2017–2020) ====
A new series of Takeshi's Castle aired on Comedy Central, initially with Jonathan Ross as voiceover. This version used footage from the Thailand series, and later the Indonesian version. Ross was later replaced by Roman Kemp as host in 2018, with Martin Kemp, Chris Hughes, Georgia Toffolo, Georgia Kousoulou, Tommy Mallett and Vick Hope as guest co-hosts for one week each, this time visible in the corner of the screen. Kemp was followed by Guz Khan in 2019, with guests including Basil Brush and Joey Essex, and then Stephen Bailey in 2020 for the Indonesian version of the show, with guests Chris Kamara, Joey Essex, Scarlett Moffatt, Basil Brush, Judi Love, Charlotte Dawson, Matt Richardson and Ollie Locke.

==== Romesh and Tom Take Takeshi's Castle (2023) ====
The British version of the 2023 reboot of the show, named Romesh and Tom Take Takeshi's Castle, was commentated by Romesh Ranganathan and Tom Davis, and was released on Amazon Prime Video on 30 August that year. This was the first British version of the show that displayed full episodes of the Japanese show with its original format and graphics, as well as full player introductions.

=== United States ===
In the United States, Takeshi's Castle was utilized as the video footage for the show MXC (subtitled Most Extreme Elimination Challenge) on Spike TV, which substituted the original audio with comical dubbing and commentary in English which is completely unrelated to the original dialogue and story of Takeshi's Castle. The show has also been broadcast in Canada, Australia, and New Zealand. The Thailand and Indonesian versions of the show, using the Comedy Central UK dub, aired in the US on G4, starting in late 2021.

Two attempts were made to Americanize the format:

- On 28 July 1990, Fox aired a special half-hour version of the original show premise entitled King of the Mountain which was packaged by Fox Square Productions and was hosted by John Mulrooney and Judy Toll. This version used the same games, but had only 10 competitors and no costumed characters to impede the players' progress. This American attempt only taped two pilots (one on 24 July 1988), and only the aforementioned was aired. Footage from both of these pilots were used in episode 106 of Takeshi's Castle.
- On 16 June 1993, CBS aired the second attempt, entitled Storm the Castle. This hour-long version, which was packaged by Vin Di Bona Productions and hosted by Michael Burger and Nely Galán, pitted 30 families against each other and against well-known monsters (such as Beetlejuice) in a quest to win $15,000. Unlike Mountain, Storm had some exclusive games not seen anywhere else. Storm, like Mountain, only lasted a single special. Future NFL player Christian Fauria appeared with his family as contestants.

=== Vietnam ===
The Vietnamese show Đại Náo Thành Takeshi produced under license, with the first episode airing 25 March 2017 in primetime on VTV3. The program features famous Vietnamese artists, with warlords Takeshi played by Trấn Thành and Sharkito by Trương Thế Vinh, and Princess Woonsenko played by Diễm My 9X. Challenges in the first episode included Slippery Wall, Slip Way, Honeycomb Maze, and Final Fall. The Show Down in front of the castle takes place in boats equipped with water spray nozzle weapons and paper disc targets. After the airing of the 13 episodes filmed, the show was generally criticized by the lack of creativity of the hosts and other factors.

== Cultural impact ==
Takeshi's Castle was highly influential on popular culture around the world, inspiring a genre of game shows involving physical challenges and painful entertainment. The physical challenge game show format of Takeshi's Castle has inspired numerous game shows internationally, with popular examples including Sasuke (Ninja Warrior), American Ninja Warrior, Ninja Warrior UK, Wipeout, Total Wipeout, Hole in the Wall, and Ultimate Beastmaster. The reality television franchise I'm a Celebrity...Get Me Out of Here! also incorporates Takeshi's Castle like physical challenges. British comedian Alex Horne has said Takeshi's Castle was one of the inspirations for Taskmaster. Stuart Heritage of The Guardian argues that the Tough Mudder endurance events may have also been inspired by Takeshi's Castle.

British GQ compared the "silly sets and close awkwardness" of Floor Is Lava (2020) to "the belly-laugh slapstick of Japanese game shows" such as Takeshi's Castle. The 2021 game show Frogger, based on Konami's 1981 arcade game of the same name, has also drawn comparisons to Takeshi's Castle. In 2023, The Guardian argued that the video game Fall Guys was "Takeshi's Castle in all but name."

In a 2021 LADbible poll, Takeshi's Castle was voted the classic UK TV game show that audiences miss the most. In 2023, there was nostalgia for Takeshi's Castle in Japan.

=== Other media ===
A Nintendo Famicom (NES) game with the same name was released in 1987 by Bandai. It required the use of the Family Trainer (Power Pad) to play its eight challenges. It was played on the twelfth episode of GameCenter CX. A sequel called Fūun! Takeshi Jō Two was released in 1988 with different challenges.

A J2ME mobile game based on the second Spanish language dubbed version of Takeshi's Castle, called Humor Amarillo: El Juego-Móvil was developed and released by Gameloft in 2008.

The casting of Takeshi Kitano in the 2000 Japanese film Battle Royale was a reference to his earlier role as the host of Takeshi's Castle, to add a sense of potential realism to the film's extreme battle royale game show concept.

Video game developer Mediatonic cited Takeshi's Castle as an inspiration behind the popular battle royale game Fall Guys (2020).

In March 2026, TBS debuted new crossover spinoff format called Musou that mixed the format of Takeshi's Castle and other TBS physical gameshows such as Sasuke, Kunoichi, Sports Danshi Grand Prix, DOORS and Tokyo Friend Park.
