= Most Extreme Elimination Challenge =

American comedy television series

- Created by: Paul Abeyta; Peter Kaikko; Larry Strawther
- Based on: Takeshi's Castle
- Starring: Victor Wilson (voice); Christopher Darga (voice); John Cervenka (voice); Mary Scheer (voice); Takeshi Kitano (body); Hayato Tani (body); Junji Inagawa (body)
- Narrated by: Jamie Alcroft (ep. 1-4); John Cervenka (ep. 5-81)
- Opening theme: "Firebrand" by Bumblefoot
- Country of origin: United States
- No. of seasons: 5
- No. of episodes: 81 (list of episodes)

Production
- Executive producers: Paul Abeyta; Peter Kaikko; Larry Strawther
- Producers: Christopher Darga; John Cervenka (Note: Cervenka served as producer for seasons one thru three, and season five.); Herbert C. Goss (Note: Goss and Jenkins served as producers during season four and five.); Ray James (Note: James and Pleasants served as producers during season five.); Roy Jenkins; Kip Madsen (Note: Madsen served as producer during season four.); CeCe Pleasants; Mary Scheer (Note: Mary Scheer serves as producer for the first three seasons, and supervising producer for seasons four and five.); Victor Wilson (Note: Victor Wilson serves as producer for seasons one and two and supervising producer for season three.)
- Running time: approx. 20 minutes
- Production companies: RC Entertainment, Inc. The New TNN Originals (2003) (seasons 1–2); Spike TV (2003–2006) (seasons 2-4); Spike Originals (2006–2007) (season 5)

Original release
- Network: The New TNN/Spike
- Release: April 19, 2003 – February 9, 2007

Most Extreme Elimination Challenge (MXC) is an American sports comedy television program that aired on TNN/Spike TV from April 19, 2003 to February 9, 2007. It re-purposes footage from the Japanese game show Takeshi's Castle, which originally aired in Japan from 1986 to 1990. The re-purposed MXC created a completely new premise, storyline, and characters, with two teams competing against each other à la a typical team sports broadcast and players trying to win points for their teams by surviving through different challenges. In the original program the Count and his underlings would follow the progress of the players as they moved through the course. In the re-purpose, Count Takeshi became veteran network announcer Vic Romano and the Count's flunky became young upstart Kenny Blankenship.

Most Extreme Elimination Challenge was created and produced by RC Entertainment, Inc. (Paul Abeyta and Peter Kaikko) in Los Angeles, California, and Larry Strawther (a writer and producer on a number of network sitcoms). The three were friends who had worked together at Merv Griffin Productions in the late 1970s. Strawther was a staffer on Dance Fever, which Abeyta took over as executive producer the following season, while Strawther stayed with Jeopardy!. Between jobs they would occasionally try to create their own projects. One of these was the 1990s talk show spoof Night Stand with Dick Dietrick. MXC is the property of both Tokyo Broadcasting System (TBS) and RC Entertainment. The 2004 special episode MXC Almost Live is the property of Viacom International and was filmed in Orlando, Florida, by the producers of MXC.

== Episodes ==
Season	Episodes	Originally released	
Season	Episodes	First released	Last released
1	13	April 19, 2003	July 19, 2003
2	13	July 31, 2003	November 6, 2003
3	27	April 22, 2004	April 7, 2005
4	15	October 20, 2005	March 9, 2006
5	13	November 9, 2006	February 9, 2007

The premise of Most Extreme Elimination Challenge (as distinct from Takeshi's Castle) is a game show that is hosted by the eccentric characters Vic Romano (Vic Wilson) and Kenny Blankenship (Chris Darga), along with the field marshal Captain Tenneal (John Cervenka) and the field reporter Guy LeDouche (John Cervenka). The announcer (John Cervenka) would begin each episode with this standard introduction:

"What are these people running from? They're not! They're running to the world's toughest competition in town!"

When the show was transitioning away from its full name, it briefly added "Most Extreme Elimination Challenge!" to the end of the opening.

Eventually, the opening introduction was changed to:

"Get fired up for MXC! The world's most toughest competition in town!"

Usually, two or three teams of contestants compete in several turn-based and head-to-head challenges. The only episode done without a competitive team base was the first episode ever made, which was simply centered around the stereotypical antics of college girls. Even though this was the first episode made, it was the seventh episode of season one to air.

The contestants compete in a variety of challenges, usually four per episode, but occasionally as many as six. The challenges are extremely hard, and a majority of the contestants fail to complete the challenges. Throughout the show, painful failures to complete challenges are reviewed by Vic and Kenny in the "MXC Impact Replay" (briefly given sponsor names like the "Snickers Satisfies Replay" and the "Slim Jim Snap of the Day"), which is essentially a sports-themed playback feature. Occasionally, the Impact Replay is used for Kenny's pleasure, in looking at the female contestants, items, or random events in the series which he finds funny or disappointing. Contestants who do complete a challenge earn points for their team. The team with the most points at the end of the episode wins the competition. At the end of each episode, Kenny counts down the ten "Most Painful Eliminations of the Day", which usually focus on the events shown in the Impact Replay, but sometimes includes random events that involved the main or recurring characters.

Kenny and Vic, along with any other people around them at the end of the show, all end the episode by saying: "Don't get eliminated!" initiated by one of the two asking "What do we always say?"

=== MXC Almost Live and other special episodes ===
On April 22, 2004, Spike TV aired a special edition of the show to start the third season, featuring skateboarder Tony Hawk and snowboarder Tara Dakides. The special was taped at the Universal Orlando Resort in Orlando, Florida, using students from nearby colleges and dubbed MXC Almost Live. The special edition is not based on the original Takeshi's Castle footage, but only has some added in for Vic, Ken, the Captain, and Guy LeDouche. Actors were hired to play those who would replace the roles of the latter two, named "Major Babe" (Michelle Sorrell) and "Gip LeDouche" (Eric Esteban).

Three other special episodes aired, all from Season 2, including a special nighttime episode, a "Monsters vs. Mascots" episode, and a special winter episode.

Spike initially held a contest in 2005 or 2006 in which the winner was to have his name and the name of five of his friends used in an episode of MXC and would also receive a viewing party of that episode for up to 50 people at a place of his choice. However, this contest never fully materialized and was canceled for unknown reasons.

== Characters ==
=== Main characters ===
- Vic Romano (voiced by Victor Wilson) is the co-host and play-by-play commentator. In Takeshi's Castle, Vic's character is Count Takeshi himself, the main character of the show. In MXC, Vic is level-headed, has a dark past of alcohol abuse, failed marriages, and various addictions, and generally treats MXC as a serious competition. Vic was once also a professional baseball player who became addicted to "everything", including every type of drug, alcohol, and easy women. He was a former news anchor who lost his job because "the scotch made the teleprompter blurry" and once was an airline pilot during his stint of alcohol abuse, but states: "Luckily, nobody noticed." Notable catchphrases include "Right you are, Ken!", "Good to know!", "I think you might be right, Ken!", "Indeed!", and "Kenny!", which is usually followed by him smacking Kenny's head with a paper fan, in response to Kenny's commentary of the action. He's especially fond of his 1974 AMC Matador coupe. The character is played by Japanese actor and movie director Takeshi Kitano, who also created the original series from which MXC takes its footage, Takeshi's Castle.
- Kenny Blankenship (voiced by Chris Darga) is Vic's co-host and color commentator. Blankenship is a high-school dropout whose uncle owns the network. Kenny's character is very unprofessional about hosting, far less serious about the job than Vic's character is. Despite his non-professional, simplistic stand-point, he claims to make ten times the amount that Vic does because of his uncle being one of the network bosses. Kenny has also been stated to own a condo complex from all the money that he earns from hosting and drives a Volkswagen Jetta. During hosting, in addition to providing additional information on each competitor or what entity they are a part of, Kenny usually spends his time commenting on the sexual appeal of the female competitors and how much he likes beer, pizza, and seeing the majority of competitors wipe out. Kenny's character was originally played by Japanese politician and comedian Hideo Higashikokubaru.
- Captain Tenneal (voiced by John Cervenka), whose name comes from the 1970s musical act Captain & Tennille, is the field marshal who conducts the contestants through each challenge with a sharp "Get it on!" (in the manner of former TV judge and boxing referee Mills Lane, whose courtroom show appeared on The Nashville Network, the predecessor of Spike TV). Near the beginning of each MXC episode, he is seen addressing the contestants as a group, asking whether some broad assertion relating to one of the topics in the episode is true. After the contestants raise their hands to show agreement, the Captain usually declares "Well, you're wrong!", but in a few episodes, he actually agrees with the contestants. He'll sometimes defend his opinion by saying, "Of course I'm right, I'm the Captain!" After further explanation and give-and-take with individual contestants, he bellows "Let's go!" and leads the contestants forward to begin playing the games. Captain Tenneal usually displays traditional attitudes towards social issues and speaks formally (calling Vic and Kenny "Victor" and "Kenneth," respectively) and takes pride in both his military service and modest pension. He is the author of a best-selling book (Well, you're wrong!) and is not above trading suggestive innuendo with the female competitors, almost all of whom are interested in him romantically. Captain Tenneal is played by Hayato Tani.
- Guy LeDouche (pronounced "gee" as in "geezer")(voiced by John Cervenka) is the MXC field reporter. He is portrayed wearing a pith helmet and his personality is that of a deranged and maniacal pervert of suggested French descent who has an omnisexual orientation, as he makes passes to many of the contestants he interviews, regardless of gender. Almost any interaction with the contestants arouses Guy, even those where they do violence to him, and he will respond with, "Guy like!", and sometimes responds with maniacal laughter. In addition to this, he is seen to have a romantic interest in Captain Tenneal, always calling him "Skipper". He has other family member interviewers who show the same behavior, such as "Lyndon" (which plays off political figure Lyndon LaRouche), "Geek", "Giddy", "Gip", "Goon", "Gawp", and "Gawk", along with females named "Gay", "Grandmama", "Gab", "Gin", "Gidget", and "Gal", with an unrelated reporter named Al Frankincense. Guy is played by Junji Inagawa. The family (and Al) is voiced by John Cervenka (male) and Mary Scheer (female). Guy, and his family members, along with interviewing contestants, will also announce the games that will be played in each episode, and will sometimes explain one or more of the games' objectives.
- Series Announcer (voiced by John Cervenka) Cervenka became the series announcer after replacing Jamie Alcroft who only announced the first four episodes. Cervenka was not credited as the series announcer until season 3 (where his role was called "Your Humble Announcer" in the end credits).

=== Recurring characters ===
The following are characters who have established a semi-consistent name. However, their names may change to fit in with a show's theme or style of game.

- Danny Glands (Voiced by John Cervenka), whose name is a play on the name of long-time Las Vegas entertainer Danny Gans, is an MXC staffer who works in many of the games. His primary responsibilities include asking questions in Finger It (later renamed Hand Job), knocking down contestants in Brass Balls, and launching the soccer balls in Dirty Balls. He was also known as Jimmy Junk, Sugar Ramos Phiss, Golden Shower Boy, Barry Sosa, and Spin. The original actor is early 1980s J-Pop star Michiru Jo; he is notably skinny, and his voice actor adopts a nasal, nerdy tone.
- Skanky is a 16-foot (5 m) samurai who punishes contestants who fail to complete the Wall Bangers game, and sometimes also the Tumbling Dominoes of Doom and Clear Sphere of Fear games.
- Chief Otto Parts (a parody of the Chief Auto Parts auto supply store chain) is a Native American who taunts the contestants in Rotating Surfboard of Death.
- Em on Em (a spoof of rapper Eminem) is a set of twin rappers dressed in rainbow ponchos and bowler hats. The main games in which these characters participate include Tumbling Dominos of Doom and Irritable Bowl Syndrome. The characters are also known as "Babe and Ruth", "Bud and Pud", and "Jessie and Jackson" among others. They are played by identical twins Shoji and Shoichi Kinoshita. In one of the episodes, a contestant was said to have the name Marshall Mathers.
- The Baba Ganoosh Family is a family of contestants from the Middle East who appear in nearly every episode. The last name "Baba Ganoosh" became a popular running gag throughout the series. It comes from Chris Darga's Lebanese heritage, in which baba ganoush is a popular entree.
- The Brown Spider taunts contestants in various games, including Wall Buggers and Dash to Death. Usually played by Brad Lesley, a former Major League Baseball pitcher who also played in Japan and stayed there after his retirement.
- Herbie the Steamy Pile is a strange, brown creature who taunts and sprays fallen contestants with a fire-extinguisher in Buck Off!
- The Zygote Brothers are identical characters that appear in the game Dash to Death. They attempt to distract the contestants and knock them into the water as they run through the obstacle course.
- Levi Palmer is the only American to compete on and win a game of MXC, he is heavily featured in the episode starring Howard Stern's wack pack.
- Sporky played by Shozo "Strong" Kobayashi is a character featured in the game Dash to Death. Hiding inside a jail cell near the "spinner" obstacle, Sporky taunts contestants as they pass by. If contestants fail in the area of the course around him, Sporky is usually credited with distracting the contestant into falling off the course.
- The Diddler is a character exclusive to the game Little Man in the Boat. If contestants don't go far enough on the course, The Diddler appears out of nowhere and pushes the contestant off and into the water.

== Production ==
In the show, the contestants' names are usually slightly altered names of celebrities, network bosses, or family members and friends of the producers or voice actors. Several recurring names appear in the show; the most common family name is Babaganoosh, since the producers of MXC were given short deadlines for producing episodes, therefore giving them limited time to write the scripts.

During the production of the show, the network bosses stated that they did not want the producers to repeat games from episode to episode, but the producers ignored this, knowing 1) they didn't have the rights to enough episodes at the time to not repeat, and 2) some of the games (especially Log Drop and Sinkers or Floaters) proved to be interesting and funny every time. Some fan-favorite and recurring games included Log Drop, Wall Bangers, Dope on a Rope, Rotating Surfboard of Death, and Sinkers and Floaters, among many others.

While the basic premise of MXC is that of a legitimate game show, its true premise is that of a comedy not intended to be taken literally. All original audio was stripped from each show for legal reasons, and all audio was added by producer-writers and an audio technician, leaving none of the original audio from Takeshi's Castle. The script is completely unrelated to the original Japanese dialogue; both Abeyta and Strawther's original notes deliberately avoided any references to Japanese or Asian culture. Some thought the only Japanese-related, albeit loosely, term used for the show was the name Most Extreme Elimination Challenge, which has a Japanese-like naming style. But Strawther noted that the title – pitched by Abeyta – was a spoof on network buying tendencies of the time – "Extreme sports were big and the term was being thrown around everywhere. We thought it was funny to use "Most Extreme." All the producers and writers admit that they had no knowledge of what the contestants or actors were originally saying during the filming of Takeshi's Castle. Nonetheless, the producer-writer's ability to match the original Japanese dialog and action to something completely unrelated in English was uncanny. MXC's early scripts spoofed pop culture, or mocked various celebrities, athletes, sports announcers, politicians, with the occasional sexual pun. In later seasons, with network encouragement, sexual puns and references took on a much larger role, to the dismay of some of the show's producers who felt the cheap jokes led to its demise earlier than necessary. Contestants are given seemingly incongruous but humorous names and occupations based on their team and physical appearance (e.g. Sal Bloomberg from Sioux Falls, South Dakota, a meat handler team member in the Season 1 episode "Meat Handlers vs. Cartoon Voice Actors", aka "Network Boss"). In addition, the various challenges are all given humorous names, such as Sinkers & Floaters or Wall Bangers. Any water or mud used in a challenge is given humorous names from Kenny and Vic, notably "safety fluid", with Kenny usually following it with a more specific name (e.g. "runoff from Hot Carl's chili cook off"). The footage for a single episode of MXC can come from multiple episodes of Takeshi's Castle, and occasionally the same footage, including challenges, will be used in multiple episodes with different character names and dialogue. Unlike international editions of Takeshi's Castle, the original text that appeared on screen is left as is.

All four of the producer-performer-writers on the series are alumni of the famous Groundlings comedy troupe in Hollywood: John Cervenka, Christopher Darga, Mary Scheer, and Victor Wilson. The creators/Exec Producers Paul Abeyta and Larry Strawther had worked together at Merv Griffin Productions in the late 1970s. Strawther had worked on the company's pilots for the re-boot of Jeopardy! and Dance Fever in 1978. When both shows sold Strawther went with Jeopardy! as its head writer and Abeyta came over to Griffin's talk show and became executive producer of Dance Fever. Kaikko worked for Dance Fever's distributor, 20th Century Fox, and while overseeing that show he struck up a longtime friendship and business partnership with Abeyta. Kaikko and Abeyta teamed to co-create and Executive Produce the original series Burt Luddin's Love Buffet on Game Show Network which starred John Cervenka. Strawther went on to write and produce network sitcoms, including Happy Days, Laverne & Shirley, Night Court, and My Sister Sam and some movies like Without a Clue, but between jobs he would work with Abeyta and Kaikko on specific projects that seemed fun to him. John Cervenka was also the announcer for tv series Love Connection from 1990 - 1999.

== Home video releases ==
Season	Region 1 DVD release date
1	October 3, 2006
2	April 17, 2007
3 (Half 1)	November 6, 2007
3 (Half 2)	November 11, 2008
4	November 11, 2008
Season	Region A Blu-ray release date
1-3	November 26, 2024
4-5	February 25, 2025

== Lawsuits ==
The American gameshow Wipeout on ABC was accused of being "a blatant copycat" of shows such as Takeshi's Castle and Most Extreme Elimination Challenge, and a copyright infringement lawsuit was filed by Tokyo Broadcasting System against ABC in late 2008, claiming the obstacle-course game show closely resembled several Japanese shows. It alleged Wipeout violated its copyrights to shows such as Takeshi's Castle and Ninja Warrior.

The Japanese network later sued Dutch entertainment giant Endemol, which produces Wipeout.

The companies settled the case on November 30, 2011, after meeting with a federal magistrate judge in Los Angeles. No settlement terms were filed with the court.
