= Pippa Cross =

English film and television producer

- Born: 13 March 1956 (age 70); Ipswich, Suffolk England
- Occupations: Film and television producer
- Years active: 1980–present

Pippa Cross (born 13 March 1956) is an English film and television producer. Since 1980 she has overseen the production of numerous films for Granada Media and her independent production company, CrossDay Productions.

== Life and career ==
Cross was born and raised in Ipswich, Suffolk. Her father, Robert Cross, was an executive on the Ipswich Borough Council and played a part in creating the Ipswich Film Theatre. She began a degree at the University of Oxford in English literature in 1974, and upon graduating in 1977 she took on a job at the newly opened Wembley Conference Centre. As part of her role she organised a BAFTA Awards ceremony at the centre, which led her to pursue a career in film and television.

Cross began working at Granada Media (now ITV Studios) in 1980 and moved from its dramatic programming department to the television documentary division, where she contributed to 28 Up, an installment of the documentary series 28 Up. When Granada Films was founded in 1988, she was appointed its first head of development and oversaw the production of the company's first two films, My Left Foot (1989) and The Field (1990). She left to work at Television South for a short period before returning to Grenada in 1993. She was appointed Granada's head of film, a position she held from 1993 until 2002, where she produced or executive produced the films Jack and Sarah (1995), The Hole (2001), Ghost World (2001), Bloody Sunday (2002) and Vanity Fair (2004).

In 2002, Cross left Granada to set up CrossDay Productions, an independent production company, with her business partner. At CrossDay, she has produced Shooting Dogs, a 2005 drama about the Rwandan genocide; Heartless, a 2009 horror film; and Chalet Girl, a 2011 romantic comedy, among others. She was a co-producer on Summer in February (2013).

Cross is a member of the British Academy of Film and Television Arts (BAFTA), sits on the British Independent Film Awards advisory panel, and was a director of the UK Film Council from 2008 to 2012.
