= Hayato Tani =

Japanese actor

- Born: Hajime Iwatani; September 9, 1946 (age 80); Kirishima, Kagoshima, Empire of Japan
- Other name: Takahiro Iwatani
- Occupations: Actor, host, singer
- Years active: 1961-present
- Spouse: Kikko Matsuoka

Hayato Tani (谷 隼人, Tani Hayato; born September 9, 1946 as Hajime Iwatani) is a Japanese actor, singer and television presenter best known for his career as General Tani in Takeshi's Castle and Commander Sugata in Hikari Sentai Maskman. He is affiliated to the Goodfellows agency and has a business partnership with Anemoi Entertainment, the agency representing singer and actor Gentaro Takahashi.

== Biography ==
He was born in Kirishima, Kagoshima, Japan and raised in Sasebo, Nagasaki. Due to his father's wish of a military man and eldest of two siblings (one sister), in addition to financial reasons, his father, a military officer, believed that "If you grow up in an all-female household with three older sisters and one younger sister, you'll end up becoming effeminate". Tani's mother and his three older sisters lived in Sasebo (where his mother's family home was located), while Tani lived separately with his father and his younger sister. . During the fifth grade of elementary school, his father, who worked for the Defense Agency, was transferred, and the four of them, including his mother and young sister, moved from Sasebo to Nakano ward, Tokyo. He attended the Nakano Ward Eight Middle School and moved to the newly-established Kita-Nakano Middle School in his second year. Tani himself said to be "born in Kagoshima, Kyushu and grew up in Sasebo, Nagasaki Prefecture".

During a summer school vacation in his third year of middle school, Tani debuted in acting at the age of 15, when he played the role of Younger Taritari in the TV drama Shonen Kenya in 1961, (where he was credited under his real name Hajime Iwatani). In the spring of 1963, after passing the New Face exam at Nikkatsu, where Yujiro Ishihara, who Tani long admired, also worked. He dropped out of St. Paul's High School two years later and starred in a film for the company, but shortly left afterwards. Tani himself dismissed said stories as "nonsense", declaring "I didn't like studying, so I dropped out of high school because I was working in the nightlife industry. I ran a kissaten, worked as a cook apprentice in the Yoyogi Park and as a low-rank staff member at a hostess club in Shinjuku. While I was working in the nightlife business, someone from Nikkatsu approached me and I stayed there for a few months. They called me a new face, but I wasn't. I mostly worked part-time at Nikkatsu, so there was nothing at all." His contemporary was Yoko Yamamoto. Even after joining Toei, Tani was worried about whether he could make a living as an actor, thus he continued working in the nightlife business for a while, Later, with roles in dramas such as Key Hunter , he gained a large number of female fans and became very popular, but he says that he was even more popular during his time in the nightlife industry, when he was young and slept with five women in a night.

While he worked in snack bars in Yoyogi and Shibuya, Tani immediately thought that he could make money if he became an actor., and immediately acepted the offer. In 1966, he joined Toei. Some sources claim he was scouted by a Toei executive, immediately accepting the offer in 1966. However, Tani stated "I was working at a Shibuya kissaten run by the girlfriend of Yoshihiro Kawaguchi from Theatre de Poche, and I was scouted there by Kawaguchi and Shingo Kobayashi from Horipro." When Kawaguchi and Kobayashi asked "what his real name was", he answered "Iwatani". They asked "That sounds serious. Where were you born?", He replied "Near Hayato in Kagoshima.". They responeded "Hmm... I let's see if there is something like Hayato Iwatani... Oh! I don't need the "Iwa", Hayato Tani". He made up his stage name in 3 minutes. Tani himself said to be "born in Kagoshima, Kyushu and grew up in Sasebo, Nagasaki Prefecture". Under the Hayato Tani stage name, he made his debut in 1966 in Yasuo Furuhata's directorial debut film Delinquent Girl Yoko, starring Mako Midori alongside Tani, Reiko Ohara and Renji Ishibashi; Tani played the role of a timid high school student who was high on Hyminal sleeping pills in Shinjuku., and immediately acepted the offer. In 1966., and immediately acepted the offer. In 1966. Due to his physical appearance, he was billed as "the Japanese Alain Delon" and was chosen as spokesman for stylist Ted Lapidus in Japan. He first met his second wife Kikko Matsuoka, when she sent him to voice training with Jun Suzuki and Mieko Arima shortly after joining Toei. Tani became one of Toei's action stars and appeared in the Abashiri Prison series, the Delinquent Boss series and the Yoru no Kayo series, he joined Toei. He appeared in the Delinquent Boss series of films because he liked Steve McQueen and he was good at riding motorcycles as well.

In 1968, Tani starred in the TV drama Key Hunter, alongside Tetsuro Tamba and Sonny Chiba. His charismatic character and acting skills made him a popular star. His popularity with female fans skyrocketed after he appeared as a men's clothing model at a department store in late 1968. He began making appearances in idol magazines like Weekly Myojo, with articles about his work in Delinquent Boss were published as well. He also made regular appearances as one of the main cast members in the series following Key Hunter, Eyeful Daisakusen (1974-1975) and Birdie Daisakusen. For seven years, Tani was a key figure of the TBS's Saturday 9pm TV drama slot alongside Tamba. In between these years, Tani, at the age of 27, played the role of a high school student in the film Cruel High School: Bad Boy, he joined Toei, which spawned two sequels until 1974, he joined Toei. The third film, Cruel High School: Bad Boy - Iron Bound Classmate, released on 30 March 1974, was a failure, he took responsibility and left Toei. Tani was approached to appear in "G-Men '75," the series that followed "Birdie Daisakusen," but after appearing in "Terauchi Kantaro Ikka 2," he became interested in family dramas and decided to move away from action acting, so he declined the offer. This marked a turning point that led to his transition from acting to being a TV personality. Since then, he has been active mainly in variety shows in addition various TV dramas. Between 1986 and 1989, Tani appeared regularly in Takeshi's Castle as the attacking team's captain (攻撃隊長, kōgeki taichō), Captain Tani (谷隊長, Tani-taichō)| (known also as General Tani, General Lee in UK and Indian versions of Takeshi's Castle and "Captain Tenneal" in the U.S. version MXC), which became a hot topic. He also reprised his attacking team's captain role in the 2023 version of Takeshi's Castle.

== Personal life ==
In 1971, when Tani's popularity among women increased thanks to his appearances in TV dramas such as Key Hunter, he married fashion model Michiko Oka (in 1967, Tani saw a flyer for Oka's model club "Central" and fell in love with her at first sight, leading Oka to introduce herself to him)., and immediately acepted the offer. In 1966 after a passionate romance. At the time, Tani was 24 years old and was not in a rush to get married. Since his partner was a fashion model and not a famous actress, both of Tani's parents and Toei strongly opposed the marriage, as the latter considered Tani as part of the next generation of stars to succeed Ken Takakura and other actors. Tani was affiliated to talent agency Group '71, not to Toei and the issue became more serious when Fuji Television coordinated his engagement announcement and wedding ceremony with the agency. Tani begged to the chairman of his agency, and the couple went to the home of Toei's managing director Shigeru Okada, who acted as matchmaker, to secure his consent. On 31 May 1971, Tani and Oka finally announced their engagement at the Tokyo Prince Hotel. On June of the same year, they held their wedding ceremony in a Swiss church, a place he had dreamed of since his elementary school days., and immediately acepted the offer. In 1966. However, Tani and Oka divorced in 1974, during the filming of Birdie Daisakusen. The reason was said that Tani's mother did not like Oka as a bride.

He first met his future second wife, Kikko Matsuoka, in high school and later co-starred with her in the TV dramas Key Hunter, Eyeful Daisakusen and Birdie Daisakusen. In 1981, they got married in 1981, and, as a couple, they appeared on several television shows. The couple has often appeared on TV Tokyo's travel and gourmet programs.

Tani is currently writing a dining guide wherein he discusses maintaining a healthy lifestyle.

== Anedoctes ==
- While working for Nikkatsu, one day during filming, there was a scene where Tani had to jump off a cliff into the sea, and everyone was trembling in fear, saying "If there is a rock sticking out, we'll get killed!", Tani was the first to jump in, bravely saying "Let me do it!" When he emerged from the sea, the other actors who were present harshly scolded him, saying, "What a horrible and despicable guy! Does he has to go to such lengths to make himself look good?". On the other hand, he was fed up with the unreasonable people who saw things in their perspective, despite his good faith, leading Tani to part his ways with Nikkatsu,
- When he was cast as a co-star with Ken Takakura, he complained about the few lines his character had, which was a bitter experience for him, forcing him to withdraw. Since Takakura wrote the role for Tani, the latter immediately apologised and said that it made his friendship with Takakura even more deeper. From then on, he became Takakura's protegé and admired him for a long time. Due to his friendship with Takakura, Tani was also liked by Masao Kubo, chairman of Tohnichi Trading Co., Ltd, and became acquaintedwith Dewi Sukarno and Shigeo Nagashima. He also met Frank Sinatra and Sammy Davis Jr.. Since Tani was devoted to Takakura, Tatsuo Umemiya told him "You are Takakura's protegé!", Tani said that he never hung out with Umemiya.
- When Takeshi's Castle began airing, Beat Takeshi highly recommended that "[The attacking team's captain] has to be Tani". At the time, Tani himself had little experience in his variety show appearances and had almost to none interaction with Takeshi. Although there was negative opinions on those around Tani, he was at a time when where he was eager to try something new, being also interested about the show where viewers could take part, taking the offer in a positive way, saying that he was "happy" about it.

== Filmography ==
=== Film ===
- Delinquent Girl Yoko (非行少女ヨーコ) (1966)
- Abashiri Prison: Northern Seacoast Story (網走番外地 荒野の対決) (1966)
- Abashiri Prison: Duel in the South (網走番外地 南国の対決) (1966)
- Rampaging Dragon of the North (1966), Shinkichi
- Abashiri Prison: Challenge to the Evil (網走番外地 悪への挑戦) (1967)
- Abashiri Prison: Battle in the Blizzard (網走番外地 吹雪の斗争) (1967), Tani
- Zoku Soshiki Bōryoku (1967), Sugii
- Secret Turkish Bath (1968), Yutaka
- Young Eagles of the Kamikaze (あゝ予科練) (1968), Katsumi Shoji
- Delinquent Boss (不良番長) (1968)
- Delinquent Boss: Ocho, the She-Wolf (不良番長 猪の鹿お蝶) (1969)
- Delinquent Boss: Detention Blues (不良番長 練鑑ブルース) (1969)
- Delinquent Boss: Escort Wolf (不良番長 送り狼) (1969)
- Delinquent Boss: Rat Thief Strategy (不良番長 どぶ鼠作戦) (1969)
- Night Song Series: Nagasaki Blues (夜の歌謡シリーズ 港町ブルース)(1969)
- Night Song Series: Minatomachi Blues (夜の歌謡シリーズ 長崎ブルース)(1969)
- Night Song Series: Akudo Blues (夜の歌謡シリーズ 悪党ブルース) (1969)
- New Abashiri Prison: The Vagrant comes to Port Town (新網走番外地 さいはての流れ者) (1969)
- Delinquent Boss: Checkmate (不良番長 王手飛車) (1970)
- Delinquent Boss: Instant Fortune (不良番長 一攫千金) (1970)
- Delinquent Boss: Wolves of the City, Take your Chance (不良番長 出たとこ勝負) (1970)
- Delinquent Boss: Hooligans on Buggies (不良番長 暴走バギー団) (1970)
- The Japan Derby Race (日本ダービー 勝負) (1970)
- New Abashiri Prison: A Wolf in the Blizzard (新網走番外地 吹雪のはぐれ狼) (1970)
- Delinquent Girl Boss: Blossoming Night Dream (ずべ公番長 夢は夜ひらく) (1970), Tony
- The Experience (経験) (1970), Toshio Sakurai
- Delinquent Girl Boss: Ballad of Yokohama Hoods (ずべ公番長 はまぐれ数え唄) (1971)
- Abashiri Prison: Storm at Cape Shiretoko (新網走番外地 嵐呼ぶ知床岬) (1971)
- New Abashiri Prison Story: Escape in the Blizzard (新網走番外地 吹雪の大脱走) (1971)
- Delinquent Street (不良街) (1972)
- Night Song Series: Love Lost in Tears (夜の歌謡シリーズ なみだ恋) (1973)
- Cruel High School:Bad Boy (非情学園ワル) (1973)
- Cruel High School: Teacher Hunt (非情学園ワル 教師狩り)(1973)
- School of the Holy Beast (1974), Kenta Aoki
- Cruel High School: Bad Boy - Iron Bound Classmate (非情学園ワル ネリカン同期生) (1974)
- Minato no Yoko Yokohama Yokosuka (港のヨーコ・ヨコハマ・ヨコス) (1975)
- Rugby Yaro (ラグビー野郎) (1976)
- 'Otokogumi Shonen Keimusho (男組 少年刑務所) (1976)
- Sayama Saiban (狭山裁判) (1976)
- Pepper '80 (ピーマン80) (1979)
- Empress (女帝) (1983)
- Kekkon Annai Mystery (結婚案内ミステリー), (1985), Goro Kinoshita
- Hikari Sentai Maskman: The Movie (1987), Commander Sanjuro Sugata

=== TV dramas ===
- Shonen Kenya (1961, NET), Younger Taritari (credited as "Hajime Iwatani")
- Tokubetsu Kidou Sosaitai (1961, NET):
  - Ronin Student Sakamoto (Episode 210, 1965)
  - Shinichi (Episode 291, 1967)
  - Yasuo (Episode 329, 1968)
- Aru Yuki no Kiroku (1967, NET) - Episode 29
- Key Hunter (1968–73, TBS), Tatsuhiko Shima
- Judo Icchokusen (1969, TBS) - Episode 1 "Kakkoiizo Jigokusha"
- Eyeful Daisakusen (1973, TBS) - Yuji Ibuki
- Birdie Daisakusen (1974, TBS) - Yuji Ibuki
- Terauchi Kantaro Ikka 2 (1974, TBS) - Daisuke Terauchi
- Moeru Sosamo (1975, TBS) - Ryu Saku
- Dai Hijosen (1976, TBS) - Tetsuo Takayama
- Versailles no Truck Nee-chan (1976, NET) - Episode 18 "Tokyo no Koi ni Hadaka wa Nureru"
- Akai Shogeki (1976, TBS/Daiei TV) - Jiro Yano
- Owarinaki Fusai (1977, NHK Saturday Drama)
- Mu (1977, TBS) - Juzo
- Taiyo ni Hoero!:
  - Episode 237 (1977) - Noboru Mizusawa
  - Episode 507 (1982) - Kohei Yuki
- Ashita no Keiji (1977) - Detective Ota
- Yokomizo Seishi Series I/Yoru Aruku (1978, MBS) - Torata Yashiro
- Mu Ichizoku (1978, TBS) - Masao Tani
- Necchu Jidai (1978, NTV) - Shinpachiro Komiya
- Necchu Jidai - Keiji-hen (1979, NTV) - Takamori Senba
- Asahigaoka no Daitoryo (1979, NTV/Union Eiga)
- Naze ka Hatsukoi - Minamikaze (1980, TBS) - (credited as Takahiro Iwatani)
- Kumokiri Nizaemon (1979, KTV)
- Drama Ningen Moyo (1980, NHK) - "Sono Hashi Made" (credited as "Takahiro Iwatani")
- The Hangman, (ABC)
  - Episode 28 (1981) - Inspector Kanetani (credited as {{nihongo|Takahiro Iwatani|岩谷隆広|Iwatani Takahiro}})
  - The Hangman V - Episode 23 (1986) - Kenichi Shimada (Johnny Shimada)
- Morishige Hisaya no Oyaji wa Juku-nen (1981, TV Asahi) - Episode 18 "Furoban ga Shacho-desu", Kenichi (credited as Takahiro Iwatani)
- Ginga Drama Shosetsu - (NHK)
  - Meguri Aite (1982) - Shinya
  - Meiwaku Kakete Arigato (1984) - Tasaki
- G-Men '75 (TBS) -
  - Episode 355 (1982) - Joji Tamiya
  - G-Men '82 - Episode 17 (1983)- Kazuma Ryumon
- Ōoka Echizen Series 6 (1982, TBS) - Episode 15 - Iyoshi
- Jidaigeki Special (19, CX) - "Himeshiro Nagaretabi'"- Hyoma Odagiri
- Ōoku (1983, KTV) - Shichinosuke Ohara (episodes 35-36)
- Matsumoto-seicho no Renkan (1983, Asahi TV) - Minoru Wakuda
- Tokugawa Ieyasu (1983, NHK Taiga drama), Ōno Harunaga
- Mado no Naka no Satsujin Rikon shita Jo Kirai na Zenfu ga Watashi okasu... (1983, TV Asahi) - Yoichi
- Keiji Monogatari '85 (1985, TV Asahi) - Episode 2 "Terebi Star Satsujin Jiken" - Akihiko Matsumoto
- Hana Yomei Jo wa Dare ga Kiru (1986, Fuji TV) - Shoji Todo
- Fuun Edo-jo Doto no Shogun Tokugawa Iemitsu (1987 , TX, Toei) - Yagyu Toshikane
- Hikari Sentai Maskman (1987–1988, TV Asahi), Commander Sanjuro Sugata*
- Otoko ga Nakanai Yoru wa Nai (1987, Fuji TV) - Tadao Sakakura
- Otoko-tachi no Undo-kai (1989, NHK)
- Tennis Shojo Yume Densetsu! Ai to Kyoko (1990, Fuji TV) - Kenjiro Fujiyama
- Kaseifu wa Mita! - "Ginza - Kyōto kyoshoku to yokubō ni moeru utsukushī oyako no adeyakana himitsu" (1990, TV Asahi/TV Daiei) - Matsuo Hotta
- Daikoku '92 (1992, NTV) - Akira Kenmochi
- Tensai Terebi-kun MAX (2006, NHK) - (Lamp no Obaa-chan) - Curio dealer
- Tuesday Drama Gold/Daijoyu Satsujin Jiken (2007, NTV) - Satoru Toba
- Napoleon no Mura (2015, TBS) - Yokichi Tayama

=== Variety shows ===
- Star Tanjō! (1980, Fuji TV) - Presenter (alongside Tamori)
- Takeshi's Castle (1986–1990, TBS), Captain Tani/General Tani / Lee
- Takeshi's Castle (2023, Amazon Prime Video), Captain Tani/General Tani
- Tunnels no Minna-san no Okage desu (とんねるずのみなさんのおかげです) (1990, Fuji TV) - starred as "Phelbs" in the "Spy Daisakusen '90" sketch
- Sanji no Ai Love! Bakusho Click (1993, Kansai TV)
- All-Star Thanksgiving (2005, TBS)
- Gekitoku! Tani-Taicho no Oneuchi Yado-tettei Guide (激得!谷隊長のお値打ち温泉宿徹底ガイド) (2008, Tabi Channel)
- Geki e! Jimoto no Hito ga Oshieru! Ni-paku San-nichi no Tabi (激得!地元の人が教える!2泊3日の旅) (2008)
- Taya-chan Guide (旅ちゃんガイド) (2008)
- Kami-sama~a 〜zu (神さまぁ〜ず) (2008, TBS)
- Shiru Shiru Mishiru (2008, TV Asahi) - appeared in place of Eiji Bando
- Nanikore Chinhyakkei (TV Asahi):
  - Appeared in the audience alongside Kikko Matsuoka (2009)
  - Made an interview alongside Kiko Matsuoka about a store in Namie (Futaba District, Fukushima Prefecture) where the customers self-declared the prices at the checkout. (2010)
- Tsuchiyo Special Hanameguri no Tabi (2010, TV Tokyo)
- Watashi no Nan ga Ike nai no? (TBS TV) - semi-regular (with Kikko Matsuoka as a couple)
- Ohiru no Kaiketsu TV (2018-2019, Chiba TV)

=== Puppet shows ===
- Puppet theater, the Three Kingdoms (NHK, 1982) - Liu Bei Xuande, other roles
- Hige yo Saraba (NHK, 1984)- Owl

=== Radio ===
- Tsūhan! Nari Yuki Bangumi Taichō @ Tani Hayato no Fūun Radio Shopping (2019, NBC Radio and others)

=== Commercials ===
- Nissan - Nissan Bluebird 1600 (1968)
- Isojiman (unknown year)

== Discography ==
=== Singles ===
==== King Records ====
- Bara to Kawajan (薔薇と革ジャン) - 1969
- Yoake no Kuchibue (夜明けの口笛') - 1970
- Otoko no Nagare Uta (男の流れ歌) - 1970
- Toku e Ikitai (遠くへ行きたい) - 1971

==== CBS Sony ====
- Ōkami wa ni-do hoeru (狼は二度吠える) - 1974

==== Nippon Columbia ====
- Ashita naki Otoko no Barado (明日なき男のバラード) - 1974

=== Albums ===
- Utau Star Daishugo (歌うスター大集合) - 1991 - Compilation album
- Kisetsuhazure no Akai Bara (季節はずれの赤いバラ) - 1974 - Theme song of the Toei film Cruel High School Bad Boy (非情学園ワル ネリカン同期生, Hijo gakuen waru - nerikan dokise)
- Ōkami wa ni-do hoeru (狼は二度吠える) - 1974 - Insert song of the Toei film Cruel High School Bad Boy
- Ashita naki Otoko no Barado (明日なき男のバラード) - 1974 - Insert song of TBS TV drama Birdie Daisakusen (バーディー大作戦) character Yuji Ibuki
