= Secret Turkish Bath =

1968 Japanese film by Shinji Murayama

- Directed by: Shinji Murayama
- Screenplay by: Kikuma Shimomesaka; Koji Harima
- Starring: Reiko Ohara; Tatsuo Umemiya; Sanae Nakahara; Junsaburo Bando; Kichijiro Ueda; Hayato Tani
- Cinematography: Kiichi Inada
- Edited by: Osamu Tanaka
- Music by: Sei Ikeno
- Production company: Toei Tokyo Studio
- Distributed by: Toei Company
- Release date: August 27, 1968
- Running time: 86 minutes
- Country: Japan
- Language: Japanese

Secret Turkish Bath (（秘）トルコ風呂 (Japanese: Maruhi Toruko-buro)) is a 1968 Japanese film. The film stars Reiko Ohara and is directed by Shinji Murayama. It was produced by Toei Tokyo Studio and distributed by Toei Company. The film is rated R18+.

This was Reiko Ohara's first starring role. However, in a book written by Ohara's relatives, her starring movies are listed as Three Female Bees (1970) and Second Love (1983), omitting this film. In reality, she starred in three movies including this one.

== Plot ==
Tamako Hanamura, who moved from a small hot spring town in Tohoku to Shinjuku, works at a pachinko parlor. One day, she meets Nami, a soapland worker and money lender. Nami falls for Tamako and takes her to her apartment, becoming obsessed with her. Nami's former husband and others notice Tamako and hire her as a hostess for an orgy party. As Nami and the others' ugly desires drive them, Tamako's heart starts to drift away. Tamako has an old friend, Jun, from her hometown who is sick.

== Cast ==
- Tamako Hanamura: Reiko Ohara
- Tatsu Saijo: Tatsuo Umemiya
- Nami Taniguchi: Sanae Nakahara
- Bungo Takahara: Tozo Yamamoto
- Detective Dan: Junsaburo Bando
- Sayama: Kenji Ushio
- Keiko Kuwa: Sachiko Kuwahara
- Ayako: Keiko Kuni
- Old Gen: Ichiro Sugai
- Takeda: Naomi Shiraishi
- Tanigawa: Eiji Hide
- Matsuda: Kichijiro Ueda
- Nose: Kiyoshi Hitomi
- Yutaka: Hayato Tani
- Pachinko Parlor Owner: Sho Akiyama
- Shoe Shop Owner: Yoshikazu Sugi
- Clerk: Osamu Kimura
- Wife: Midori Yamamoto
- Young Detective: Ninomiya Kobayashi
- Turkish Bath Customer: Keishiro Kojima
- Day Laborer: Akira Kuji
- Head Clerk: Gozo Soma

== Crew ==
- Director: Shinji Murayama
- Screenplay: Kikuma Shimomesaka, Koji Harima
- Planning: Michihiko Sonoda, Kaname Ogizawa
- Cinematography: Kiichi Inada
- Music: Sei Ikeno
- Art: Shuichiro Nakamura
- Editing: Osamu Tanaka
- Sound: Tadao Komatsu
- Lighting: Hideo Motomochi
- Assistant Director: Kinji Fukasaku

== Production ==
=== Planning ===
At the time, Toei's newcomer contract period was five years. Reiko Ohara's contract was up in July 1970. After that, she could either renew with Toei, move to another film company or talent agency, or go freelance. Ohara had no starring roles in her first three years at Toei but kept getting supporting roles, indicating Toei had high hopes for her. Naturally, Toei considered extending her contract and offered her a starring role.

Ohara's journey to starring in this film was complicated. Her first offer was not this film but Kaiden Hebi Onna (released July 12, 1968). An article from Weekly Movie News on May 25, 1968, lists Ohara as part of the cast for Kaiden Hebi Onna. The "kaiden" (ghost story) genre peaked around 1960, but by this time, it was seen as an old genre. The script was more stimulating and modern, leading Ohara to decide to star in Secret Turkish Bath. However, she later appeared in Kaiden Hebi Onna after a female lead dropped out due to illness.

=== Production ===
The producer initially wanted Yumiko Nogawa but eventually chose Reiko Ohara. The script was co-written by Kikuma Shimomesaka and Koji Harima, and directed by Shinji Murayama. Filming took place at Toei Tokyo Studio. Scenes in the sento were shot at different locations, and Ohara's commitment to nude scenes was praised by staff and cast. The character of Tamako and the narrative was a departure from Toei's typical style, and the film was seen as a bold move for the studio.

== Release ==
Secret Turkish Bath was released on August 27, 1968. The film's subject matter, centered on the soapland industry, drew both intrigue and controversy, reflecting Japan's evolving cinema landscape of the late 1960s. Ohara's performance, both in terms of acting and her willingness to push boundaries, garnered attention, marking her as a prominent figure in the industry.
