= Tara Dakides =

American snowboarder

Tara Dakides (born August 20, 1975) is an American snowboarder and co-owner of O-matic Snowboards. She was born in Mission Viejo, California, and has snowboarded since she was 13 years old. She now resides in Mammoth Lakes, California.

== Career ==
As a child, she took part in gymnastics and skateboarding. When she was a teenager, she branched out into several other more dangerous sports and became involved in motocross, surfing, mountain- and snow-based sports. This variety of sports experience gave her an edge in the X Games competitions.

At the Winter X Games in 1999, Dakides won a silver medal in slopestyle and a gold in big air. In 2000, she won two gold medals, one in slopestyle with a combined score of 88.50 after three runs, the other in big air with a combined score of 78.00. In 2001, she won another big air gold medal with a score of 89.00, and finished seventh in slopestyle. At the 2001 Sims World Championships, she was first in slopestyle and fifth in big air. At the 2002 X Games, she won her third slopestyle gold medal. She also received EXPN's Snowboarder of the Year award.

In May 2003, Dakides participated in the Gumball 3000 rally race. She continues to race in motocross, shifter carts in addition to racing in the Baja 1000 competition.

== Media ==
She has appeared as a cover model for various sports magazines and has appeared in various video games. In 2001, she was on the cover of Sports Illustrated and was named "The Coolest Sports Woman in 2001".

Dakides was featured on Spike TV's special edition of MXC on April 22, 2004 which was taped at the Universal Orlando Resort in Orlando, Florida and was dubbed MXC Almost Live. At the end of the episode, Dakides successfully ran the Log Drop after being challenged by Tony Hawk.

During her appearance on the Late Show with David Letterman in 2004, Dakides attempted to perform a stunt outside the Ed Sullivan Theater but fell 15 feet from a ramp while not wearing a helmet, prompting the remainder of the episode's taping to be canceled and a rerun to be aired in its place. She was taken to hospital and required stitches on the back of her head. She recovered and returned to the show for an interview a few days later.

Dakides is a spokesperson for the Surfrider Foundation, a non-profit environmental organization.

Dakides was nominated for the 2005 Teen Choice Awards in the category of Choice Xtreme Athlete - Female, losing out to surfer Layne Beachley. She was ranked #90 on FHM's 100 Sexiest Women of 2004. She was featured in episode 62 of MTV Cribs.

Dakides appeared as the captain of the Denver Hurlers on Game Show Network's show Extreme Dodgeball. She also had a role in the film Chalet Girl in which she played herself and starred alongside Gossip Girl star Ed Westwick and Felicity Jones.
