= International Screenwriters' Festival =

International Screenwriter' Festival
- Location: Cheltenham, United Kingdom
- Language: International
- Website: http://www.screenwritersfestival.com

The International Screenwriters' Festival, founded in 2006, was an annual event held mid-year at the Manor by the Lake in Cheltenham, Gloucestershire, England. The International Screenwriter's Festival has shut down, and in 2010 was succeeded by the London Screenwriters' Festival.

== History of the festival ==
The International Screenwriters' Festival was created by ex-BBC producer David Pearson as a way to bring together current and prospective scriptwriters. The first festival was held from 27 to 30 June 2006 at the Cheltenham Film Studios and the Manor by the Lake. Over 500 delegates, producers, directors, developers and financiers attended four days of networking, debates, and panel discussions. Guest speakers included Ashley Pharoah (writer/co-creator, Life on Mars and Bonekickers), Guillermo del Toro (writer/director/producer, The Devil's Backbone, Pan’s Labyrinth, Hellboy II: The Golden Army), David M. Thompson (head of development, BBC Films), and Steven Moffat (writer, Jekyll, Doctor Who, Coupling).

The second festival, running from 3 to 6 July 2007, drew more than 600 attendees. Speakers included Michael Goldenberg (writer, Harry Potter and the Order of the Phoenix, Contact, Peter Pan), Alison Owen (producer, Brick Lane, Shaun of the Dead), and Sarah Smith (head of feature development, Aardman Animations).

The 2008 event was scheduled for 1 to 3 July, with attendance expected to surpass 600 people over the three days. Scheduled guest speakers include Jane Tranter (Head of BBC Fiction), Tanya Seghatchian (co-producer/development executive, Harry Potter films 1–5), and Terry Pratchett (novelist, Discworld series).

The fourth Festival has moved dates and venue as it took take place at The Cheltenham Ladies' College from Monday 26th to Thursday 29 October 2009.

According to festival director David Pearson, "This festival has shown that there is a need and an appetite for a welcoming, open forum for screen writing... the fact that several writers have reported to us that the festival gave them the help and impetus to move them and their projects onto success really makes me proud of the Festival."

== See also ==
- Screenwriting
