= Fumito Tomoi =

Japanese television personality

Fumito Tomoi (友井 史人), born 16 December 1974 in Nagoya, Japan) is a Japanese television host and entrepreneur that lived in Lithuania for 14 years. He was the host of Takeši Pilis, a popular Lithuanian show based on the Japanese TV show Takeshi's Castle.

Tomoi Fumito arrived to Lithuania in 1993, where studied philology and history; in 2006, he completed a master's degree in archaeologic at Vilnius University.
