= List of Japanese films of 1973 =

This is a list of films released in Japan in 1973. In that year, Japan had 2,530 movie theaters, with 1,332 screening only domestic films and 556 showing both domestic and imported films. A total of 405 Japanese films were released in 1973. Domestic films grossed a total of 19.458 million yen that year.

Japanese films released in 1973
Title	Director	Cast	Genre	Notes
Akaitori nigeta	Toshihachi Fujita	Yoshio Harada, Kaori Momoi, Masaaki Daimon	—N/a	
Battles Without Honor and Humanity	Kinji Fukasaku	Bunta Sugawara, Hiroki Matsukata, Nobuo Kaneko	—N/a	
Battles Without Honor and Humanity: Deadly Fight in Hiroshima	Kinji Fukasaku	Bunta Sugawara, Sonny Chiba, Meiko Kaji	—N/a	
Battles Without Honor and Humanity: Proxy War	Kinji Fukasaku	Bunta Sugawara, Akira Kobayashi, Tsunehiko Watase	—N/a	
Belladonna of Sadness	Eiichi Yamamoto		—N/a	Animated film
Bishamonten bojo	Michiyoshi Doi	Hideo Sunazuka, Hisaya Morishige, Junzaburo Ban	—N/a	
Esu o nerae! Tenisu okoku no Shinderera	Osamu Dezaki		—N/a	Animated short
Female Convict Scorpion: Beast Stable	Shunya Itō	Meiko Kaji, Mikio Narita, Koji Nanbara	—N/a	
Female Prisoner Scorpion: 701's Grudge Song	Yasuharu Hasebe	Meiko Kaji, Masakazu Tamura, Toshiyuki Hosokawa	—N/a	
Female Yakuza Tale: Inquisition and Torture	Teruo Ishii	Reiko Ike	Pinky Violent	
Flying At 'Ya, Android Kikaider	Hidetoshi Kitamura	Daisuke Ban	Tokusatsu	
Godzilla vs. Megalon	Jun Fukuda	Katsuhiko Sasaki, Hiroyuki Kawase, Robert Dunham	—N/a	
Gokiburi deka	Tsugunobu Kotani	Tetsuya Watari, Takeo Jii, Masaaki Daimon	—N/a	
Golgo 13 (film)				
Hangyako no hoshu	Yukihiro Sawada	Yujiro Ishihara, Tetsuya Watari, Mieko takamine	—N/a	
Hanzo the Razor – The Snare	Yasuzo Masumura	Shintaro Katsu, Kō Nishimura, Toshio Kurosawa	—N/a	
Hatachi no genten	Kenjiro Omori	Yuriko Sumi, Takeo Jii, Masaaki Daimon	—N/a	
Jyanguru Kurobe	Osamu Dezaki		—N/a	Animated short
Kagaku ninja tai Gacchaman–Densi kaiju Renjiraa	Hisayuki Toriumi		—N/a	Animated short
Kagaku ninja tai Gacchaman–Hinotori tai hikuma	Hisayuki Toriumi		—N/a	Animated short
Kamen Rider V3	Minoru Yamada	Hiroshi Miyauchi	Tokusatsu	
Kamen Rider V3 vs. the Destron Monsters	Minoru Yamada	Hiroshi Miyauchi	Tokusatsu	
Koju hosho	Kazuo Inoue	Hisaya Morishige, Etsuko Ichimura, Akira Kawaguchi	—N/a	
Kokosei burai hikae–Kanjiru u~Muramasa	Mio Ezaki	Masaaki Daimon, Yachiyo Otori, Toru Abe	—N/a	
Kokosei burai hikae–Tsuki no Muramasa	Mio Ezaki	Masaaki Daimon, Yuriko Hishimi, Sayoko Kato	—N/a	
Konketsuji Rika–Hama gure komoriuta	Kozaburo Yoshimura	Rika Aoki, Jiro Kawarazaki, Kunie Tanaka	—N/a	
Konketsuji Rika–Hitori yuku sasuraitabi	Ko Nakahira	Rika Aoki, Ryunosuke Minegishi, Kaoru Hama	—N/a	
Lady Snowblood	Toshiya Fujita	Meiko Kaji, Akira Nishimura, Toshio Kurosawa	Chanbara	
Little Adventurer–Sotsugyo ryoko	Masanobu Deme	Mark Lester, Gerald Lancaster, Zhen Zhen	Family	
Lone Wolf and Cub: Baby Cart in the Land of Demons	Kenji Misumi	Tomisaburo Wakayama, Michio Yasuda, Akihiro Tomikawa	—N/a	
Long Journey into Love	Masanobu Deme	Komaki Kurihara, Go Kato, Kyoko Maya	—N/a	
Mushukunin Mikogami no Jokichi–Tasogare ni senko ga tonda	Kazuo Ikehiro	Yoshio Harada, Isao Natsuyagi, Michiyo Yasuda	—N/a	
Mute Samurai				
Ningen kakumei	Toshio Masuda	Tetsuro Tamba, Shinsuke Ashida, Michiyo Aratama	—N/a	
Nippon kyokaden–Dai ichibu No azami/Dai nibu Aoi botan	Tai Kato	Yoko Maki, Tetsuya Watari, Kinya Kitaoji	—N/a	
Nippon sanjushi–Hakata obi shime ippon dokko no maki	Kihachi Okamoto	Keiju Kobayashi, Yusuke Okada, Mickey Yasukawa	—N/a	
Ōkami no monshō	Masashi Matsumoto	Taro Shigaki, Toshio Kurosawa, Akiko Aki	—N/a	
Omocha ya Ken-Chan–Yoso de wa iko	Yoshitaka Sone	Yasuyuki Miyawaki, Tomoko Nagaharu, Masaaki Maeda	—N/a	
Ōshō	Hiromichi Horikawa	Shintaro Katsu, Tamao Nakamura, Mikiko Otanashi	—N/a	
Panda • kopanda–Amefuri sakasu	Isao Takahata		—N/a	Animated short
The Petrified Forest	Masahiro Shinoda	Kenichi Hagiwara, Sayoko Ninomiya, Masako Yagi	—N/a	
Rainboo Man–Satsujin Purofesshyonaru	Taku Nagano	Yasukuni Mizutani, Masao Murata, Megumi Ito	—N/a	
Retreat Through the Wet Wasteland	Yukihiro Sawada	Yuri Yamashina, Takeo Chii	—N/a	
Rise, Fair Sun	Kei Kumai	Tatsuya Nakadai, Kiny Kitaoji, Keiko Sekine	—N/a	
Saeteru yatsuya	Yasuhiro Yoshimatsu	Kiyotaka Mitsuki, Ichiro Ogura, Rumi Matsumoto	—N/a	
Sakura no daimon	Kenji Misumi	Tomisaburo Wakayama, Minoru Oki, Hiroshi Sekiguchi	—N/a	
Samurai jyaiantsu–Hoeru banbaban	Tadao Nagahara		—N/a	Animated short
Sarariiman jingi	Tsugunobu Kotani	Osami Nabe, Kunie Tanaka, Raita Ryu	—N/a	
Senso o shiranai kodomatachi	Masashi Matsumoto	Yoshiki Shimamura, Sayoko Kato, Wakako Sakai	—N/a	
Sex & Fury	Noribumi Suzuki	Reiko Ike, Christina Lindberg, Masataka Naruse	Action	
Terrifying Girls' High School: Lynch Law Classroom	Noribumi Suzuki	Miki Sugimoto, Reiko Ike	Thriller	
Tidal Wave	Shiro Moritani	Keiju Kobayashi, Hiroshi Fujioka, Tetsuro Tamba	—N/a	
Tobidase! Seishun	Masahiro Takase	Takenori Murano, Shoji Ishibashi, Ichiro Arishima	—N/a	
Tora-san Loves an Artist	Yoji Yamada	Kiyoshi Atsumi, Chieko Baisho, Chieko Misaki	—N/a	
Tora-san's Forget Me Not	Yoji Yamada	Kiyoshi Atsumi, Chieko Baisho, Chieko Misaki	—N/a	
Tsugaru Folk Song	Kōichi Saitō			
Twilight Years	Shiro Toyoda	Hisaya Morishige, Hideko Takamine, Takahiro Tamura	—N/a	
Urutoraman Tarou–Moero! Urutora 6 kyodai	Kazuo Sagawa	Saburo Shinoda, Takahiko Tono, Shusuke Tsumura	—N/a	
Urutoraman Tarou–Urutora no haha wa taiyo no yo ni	Eizo Yamagiwa	Saburo Shinoda, Akira Nagoya, Takahiko Higashino	—N/a	
The World of Geisha	Tatsumi Kumashiro	Junko Miyashita	Roman porno	Kinema Junpo's 6th best Japanese film of the year
Yaju gari	Eizo Sugawa	Hiroshi Fujioka, Junzaburo Ban, Mayumi Nagisa	—N/a	
Yama nezumi Rokkii Chyakku–Ganbare Chatara	Masaharu Endo, Tadamichi Koga		—N/a	Animated short
Za • Gokiburi	Tsugunobu Kotani	Hiroshi Fujioka, Junzaburo Ban, Mayumi Nagisa	—N/a	
Zatoichi's Conspiracy	Kimiyoshi Yasuda	Shintaro Katsu, Eiji Okada, Kei Satō	—N/a	

== See also ==
- 1973 in Japan
- 1973 in Japanese television

== Sources ==
- Galbraith IV, Stuart (1996). The Japanese Filmography: 1900 through 1994. McFarland. ISBN 0-7864-0032-3.
- Galbraith IV, Stuart (2008). The Toho Studios Story: A History and Complete Filmography. Scarecrow Press. ISBN 978-1461673743.
