= Sukeban (film) =

1972 Japanese film

- Theatrical release poster
- Directed by: Norifumi Suzuki
- Written by: Norifumi Suzuki; Kiyohide Ohara; Takayuki Minagawa
- Produced by: Kanji Amao
- Starring: Miki Sugimoto; Misuzu Ōta; Ryōko Ema; Hiroshi Miyauchi; Hiromi Sairaiji
- Cinematography: Toshio Masuda
- Edited by: Kozo Horiike
- Music by: Masao Yagi
- Distributed by: Toei Company
- Release date: January 13, 1973 (Japan)
- Running time: 86 minutes
- Country: Japan
- Language: Japanese

Girl Boss Revenge: Sukeban (Japanese: スケバン), also known as Sukeban, is a 1972 Japanese exploitation film that is directed by Norifumi Suzuki and stars lead females of the sukeban genre, Reiko Ike and Miki Sugimoto.

== Cast ==
- Miki Sugimoto as Kantō Komasa/Masako Shinohara
- Misuzu Ōta as Suzue
- Ryōko Ema as Ryōko
- Hiroshi Miyauchi as Tatsuo Teyogi
- Hiromi Sairaiji as Momoko
- Jun Midorikawa as Ritsuko
- Naomi Oka as Ranko
- Rena Ichinose as Kazumi
- Rika Sudo as Mine
- Emi Jo as Yuki
- Yōko Mihara
- Tatsuo Endō
- Hiroshi Nawa as Bandō
- Akira Shioji as Satake
- Masataka Naruse as Shuji
- Takashi Fujiki
- Satoru Nabe as Kazuo
- Akira Ōizumi as Office worker
- Yasuhiro Suzuki as Police Transport
- Midori Hiro as Tomoe
- Yōko Hori
- Asao Koike
- Ichiro Araki as Ichirō
- Reiko Ike as Maya
- Bin Amatsu as Hirotake Yodo - Gang Boss
- Katsumasa Uchida as Mikami
- Akira Nitta
- Yukio Yano as Hatano
- Isao Takanami as Ozaki
- Yasuo Matsumoto as Kataoka
- Nobuo Kaneko as Visitor of the Shoe Polishing
- Sen Okaji as Ikoma
- Seizō Fukumoto as Yakuza

== Definition in Japanese exploitation cinema ==
Sukeban is a contraction of the Japanese words "suke" (female) and "bancho" (boss). The term describes a specific high school archetype which is usually (though not always) associated with juvenile delinquency. The term "zubeko" (bad girl) is no longer in vogue, but at the time these films were made, it was a hip slang expression that would more accurately have been translated as "bitch".
