= The Girls of Kamare =

Les Filles de Kamare
- Directed by: René Viénet
- Produced by: Edo Eiga
- Starring: Miki Sugimoto; Reiko Ike
- Release date: 1974
- Country: France
- Language: Japanese

The Girls of Kamare (Les Filles de Kamare) (1974) is a Situationist film by René Viénet. Unlike Viénet's previous work, Can dialectics break bricks? (1973), The Girls of Kamare includes original 16 mm hardcore inserts shot by Viénet. The title is a pun on the famous French bawdy song Les Filles de Camaret.

The film is the detournement of the Tōei sukeban film Terrifying Girls' High School: Lynch Law Classroom (1972) directed by Norifumi Suzuki. The title of the original film is given as Une petite culotte pour l'été, director credited as "Suzuki Noribumi". Opening credits are taken from the 1973 film Female Yakuza Tale: Inquisition and Torture of Teruo Ishii. While Can dialectics break bricks? was essentially a dub parody, the film keeps the original Japanese soundtrack with indelicate French subtitles.

The plot follows a team of female heroes, forced into a disciplinary school, who revolt against the authorities and their assistants. The original Japanese film ends in a successful riot which plays directly into Viénet's detournement. Unlike Dialectics, The Girls of Kamare is less self-critical and relies more on traditional conceptions of heroism.
