= One More Effort, Chinamen, if you want to be revolutionaries! =

Chinois, encore un effort pour être révolutionnaires
- Directed by: René Viénet
- Produced by: Edo Eiga
- Release date: 1977
- Country: France
- Languages: French; Mandarin Chinese

Chinese People, One more effort, to be revolutionaries! (Chinois, encore un effort pour être révolutionnaires) a.k.a. Peking Duck Soup is a 1977 film by Situationist director René Viénet.

Unlike his earlier films Can dialectics break bricks? and The Girls of Kamare, which "detourned" drama films, in this one, Viénet uses a great variety of sources (particularly archive footage of People's Republic of China leaders) to compose a political documentary sharply critical of Mao's legacy in China.

The title is a reference to the pamphlet "Français, encore un effort si vous voulez être républicains" featured in Philosophy in the Bedroom of Marquis de Sade.
