= Yakuza Law =

1969 crime film directed by Teruo Ishii

- Film poster
- Japanese: やくざ刑罰史 私刑
- Directed by: Teruo Ishii
- Written by: Teruo Ishii
- Produced by: Shigeru Okada
- Starring: Ryûtarô Ôtomo; Bunta Sugawara; Minoru Ôki; Hiroshi Miyauchi; Teruo Yoshida
- Cinematography: Osamu Furuya
- Music by: Masao Yagi
- Production company: Toei Company
- Distributed by: Toei Company
- Release date: June 27, 1969 (Japan)
- Running time: 96 minutes
- Country: Japan
- Language: Japanese

Yakuza Law (やくざ刑罰史 私刑, Yakuza Keibatsushi: Rinchi!; lit. "Yakuza Law: Lynching!") is a 1969 epic-crime-drama film written and directed by Teruo Ishii. Arrow Video licensed the film for home video release in the United Kingdom and North America in 2019.

== Plot ==
The film tells three stories of lynching and punishment by the Yakuza during the Edo, Meiji, and Shōwa periods.

== Cast ==
- Ryūtarō Ōtomo : Tomozo
- Bunta Sugawara
- Minoru Ōki as Ogata
- Hiroshi Miyauchi
- Teruo Yoshida
- Renji Ishibashi
- Keiko Fujita

== Release ==
=== Reception ===
Panos Kotzathanasis from the website "Asian Movie Pulse" wrote: "The film unfolds in a frantic pace, with the succession of scenes being non-stop, in a tactic that definitely benefits the narrative, as it allows the story to unfold as a music video, at least in terms of speed. Osamu Furuya’s cinematography presents images that definitely do now shy away from the violence, while the sudden zoom-ins on the faces of the characters inject the movie with a definite cult essence. Joey Shapiro writing for "Frame Rated" gave the film three out of five stars and called it a "fascinating monument to the glorious, messy, stomach-churning dawn of the modern exploitation flick. A genre that would only get more bonkers and horrific in the decades to come." Daniel Arboria from the "Horror News" stated: "Ishii also manages to make the film relatively compelling and fast-paced, hanging his torture games and murder set pieces on a well-worn framework, made up of the kind of questions of social responsibility and national identity that the Japanese will still be trying to process when the land of the rising sun eventually slips into the Pacific Ocean."
