= TGHS =

TGHS may refer to:

- Terrifying Girls' High School, a Japanese film series
- Toll Gate High School, Warwick, Rhode Island, United States

Gaming Group:

- TGHS The Gods Have Sent
