= Terrifying Girls' High School =

Film Series

Terrifying Girls' High School (恐怖女子高校, Kyōfu Joshi Kōkō) is a 4-film series of Pinky violence pink films made by Toei during 1972 and 1973. Reiko Ike was the star of all four films, and Miki Sugimoto co-starred in the first two.

== The films ==
1. Terrifying Girls' High School: Women's Violent Classroom (恐怖女子高校 女暴力教室, Kyōfu Joshi Kōkō: Onna Bōryōku Kyōshitsu) (29 September 1972) Director: Norifumi Suzuki)
2. Terrifying Girls' High School: Lynch Law Classroom (恐怖女子高校 暴行リンチ教室, Kyōfu Joshi Kōkō: Bōkō Rinchi Kyōshitsu) (31 March 1973) Director: Norifumi Suzuki)
3. Terrifying Girls' High School: Delinquent Convulsion Group (恐怖女子高校 不良悶絶グループ, Kyōfu Joshi Kōkō - Furyō Monzetsu Gurūpu) (1 September 1973) Director: Masahiro Shimura)
4. Terrifying Girls' High School: Animal Classmates (恐怖女子高校 アニマル同級生, Kyōfu Joshi Kōkō: Animaru Dōkyūsei) (1 December 1973) Director: Masahiro Shimura)

== Availability ==
All four films have been officially released in the United States by Discotek Media. Featuring updated English subtitles, special features, and new restoration.

== Sources ==
- D., Chris (2006). "Terrifying Girls' High School: Animal Courage (1973)". Panik House Entertainment. Archived from the original on 10 October 2007.
- D., Chris (2006). "Terrifying Girls' High School: Delinquent Convulsion Group (1973)". Panik House Entertainment. Archived from the original on 7 October 2007.
- D., Chris (2006). "Terrifying Girls' High School: Lynch Law Classroom (1973)". Panik House Entertainment. Archived from the original on 10 October 2007.
- D., Chris (2006). "Terrifying Girls' High School - Women's Violent Classroom (1972)". Panik House Entertainment. Archived from the original on 10 October 2007.
- D., Chris (2005). Toei's Bad Girl Cinema. Panik House Entertainment L.L.C. pp. 15–17. (booklet in the Pinky Violence Collection)
- Japanese Movie Database
- Macias, Patrick (2001). "Toei's "Pinky Violence" - Abnormal, Sensational, and Shameless". TokyoScope: The Japanese Cult Film Companion. San Francisco: Cadence Books. pp. 189–190. ISBN 1-56931-681-3.
