= Terrifying Girls' High School: Lynch Law Classroom =

- Film poster
- Directed by: Norifumi Suzuki
- Written by: Tatsuhiko Kamoi
- Produced by: Kanji Amao
- Starring: Reiko Ike; Miki Sugimoto
- Cinematography: Jubei Suzuki
- Edited by: Kozo Horiike
- Music by: Masao Yagi
- Distributed by: Toei
- Release date: March 31, 1973
- Running time: 88 min.
- Country: Japan
- Language: Japanese

Terrifying Girls' High School: Lynch Law Classroom (恐怖女子高校 暴行リンチ教室, Kyōfu joshikōkō: bōkō rinchi kyōshitsu) is a 1973 Japanese film in the sukeban (delinquent girl) subgenre of Toei's "Pinky violence" style of Pink film. The second in the Terrifying Girls' High School series, this was the last entry in the series directed by Norifumi Suzuki and to pair Reiko Ike and Miki Sugimoto. It is notable as the first film to depict an omorashi fetish scene to a theatrical audience, in which a girl is forced to drink a lot of water and then is denied permission to go to the toilet, forcing her to wet her skirt in class.

== Cast ==
- Reiko Ike as Maki Takagawa
- Miki Sugimoto as Noriko
- Emi Jō as Michiyo Akiyama
- Nobuo Kaneko

== Critical reception ==
Allmovie critic Donald Guarisco says that Terrifying Girls' High School: Lynch Law Classroom's "dizzying combination of prison-movie archetypes, social satire, and S & M-fueled kink is definitely not for all tastes, but there's a surprising amount of artistry behind it." He singles out Norifumi Suzuki's direction, which is "often dazzling, making skillful use of the widescreen frame and using all manner of sonic affectations and odd lighting to enhance the wildly over-the-top nature of the storyline." Lead actresses Miki Sugimoto and Reiko Ike are also praised in the review. Guarisco concludes his assessment of the film by warning, "Ultimately, Terrifying Girls' High School: Lynch Law Classroom is probably too wild and perverse for the average viewer, but cult-movie addicts willing to test their mettle will be rewarded with a film that sets out to overwhelm in the most delirious style imaginable."

Reel.com film critic Brie Beazley gives the movie a negative review, saying, "Those who are into exploitation flicks—especially ones featuring lots of naked Japanese women—will no doubt like the movie. For the rest of us, Terrifying Girls High School is an interminably long 88 minutes of surprisingly boring sex scenes and moments of sadism so explicit and gross that they border on violent pornography." She concludes, "There's precious little in Terrifying Girls High School that hasn't been seen before, whether it's the torture scenes in a Takashi Miike film or the pedestrian sex scenes found in most pornography. At least with porn and Miike's work there's a chance you'll be entertained; it's more than can be said for this Japanese import, which manages to be both boring and disgusting."

== Availability ==
On December 6, 2005, Terrifying Girls' High School: Lynch Law Classroom was released on region-1 DVD as part of the 4-disc Pinky Violence Collection box set released by Panik House. The DVD was given a separate release on October 31, 2006. Extras on the disc included the original theatrical trailer, poster images, and a commentary by Chris D., writer on Japanese exploitation cinema. Of the commentary, Reel.com notes, "The track touches on the usual production anecdotes, and fans of the movie will want to check it out."

== See also ==
- The Girls of Kamare, the "detourned" version by René Viénet
