= Champion of Death =

1975 film

Kenka karate kyokushinken Champion of Death
- Theatrical poster to the U.S. release of Champion of Death
- Directed by: Kazuhiko Yamaguchi
- Written by: Norifumi Suzuki
- Starring: Sonny Chiba; Yumi Takigawa; Mikio Narita; Jirô Chiba; Katsumasa Uchida
- Production company: Toei Company
- Distributed by: United Artists
- Release dates: August 9, 1975 (Japan); March 1977 (U.S.)
- Running time: 85 minutes
- Country: Japan
- Language: Japanese

Champion Of Death (けんか空手 極真拳, Kenka karate kyokushinken; literal translation: Fighting Karate Kyokushin Fist), also known as Karate Bullfighter, is a Japanese martial arts film made by the Toei Company in 1975. It was the first in a trilogy of films based on the manga Karate Baka Ichidai (literal translation: A Karate-Crazy Life), a manga based on Masutatsu Oyama's life by Ikki Kajiwara, Jiro Tsunoda and Jōya Kagemaru. Sonny Chiba stars as his former master Oyama who was the founder of Kyokushin karate. Chiba would reprise this role in two more films Karate Bearfighter (1975), and Karate for Life (1977).

== Plot ==
Korean-descent Japanese karate master who tries to prove that his karate is better than the modern "dance" karate. Based on Mas Oyama portrayed by student and actor Sonny Chiba.

== Cast ==
- Sonny Chiba as Mas Oyama
- Yumi Takigawa as Chiako
- Mikio Narita as Nakasone
- Katsumasa Uchida
- Kenji Imai
- Nenji Kobayashi
- Jirō Chiba as Shogo Ariake
