= 1973 in Japanese television =

Events in 1973 in Japanese television.

== Debuts ==
Show	Station	Premiere Date	Genre	Original Run
Aim for the Ace!	MBS	October 5	anime	October 5, 1973 – March 29, 1974
Babel II	NET	January 1	anime	January 1, 1973 – September 24, 1973
Cutie Honey	NET	October 13	anime	October 13, 1973 - March 30, 1974
Doraemon	Nippon TV	April 1	anime	April 1, 1973 – September 30, 1973
Edo o Kiru	TBS	September 24	jidaigeki	September 24, 1973 - July 25, 1994
Fireman	Nippon TV	January 7	tokusatsu	January 7, 1973 – July 31, 1973
Fuun Lion-Maru	Fuji TV	April 14	tokusatsu	April 14, 1973 – September 29, 1973
Horror Theater Unbalance	Fuji TV	January 8	drama	January 8, 1973 – April 2, 1973
Ike! Greenman	Nippon TV	November 12	tokusatsu	November 12, 1973, to September 27, 1974
Inazuman	NET	October 2	tokusatsu	October 2, 1973 - March 26, 1974
Jumborg Ace	NET	January 17	tokusatsu	January 17, 1973 – December 29, 1973
Kamen Rider V3	NET	February 17	tokusatsu	February 17, 1973 – February 9, 1974
Karate Baka Ichidai	NET	October 3	anime	October 3, 1973 – September 25, 1974
Kerokko Demetan	Nippon TV	April 1	anime	April 1, 1973 – September 30, 1973
Kikaider 01	NET	May 12	tokusatsu	May 12, 1973 - March 30, 1974
Kure Kure Takora	Fuji TV	October 1	drama	October 1, 1973 - September 27, 1974
Meteor Man Zone	Nippon TV	April 2	tokusatsu	April 2, 1973 – September 24, 1973
Neo-Human Casshern	Fuji TV	October 2	anime	October 2, 1973 – June 25, 1974
Robot Detective	Fuji TV	April 5	anime	April 5, 1973 – September 27, 1973
Rocky Chuck the Mountain Rat	Fuji TV	January 7	anime	January 7, 1973 – December 30, 1973
Super Robot Red Baron	Nippon TV	July 4	tokusatsu	July 4, 1973 – March 27, 1974
Tetsujin Tiger Seven	Fuji TV	October 6	tokusatsu	October 6, 1973 - March 30, 1974
The Water Margin	Nippon TV	October 2	tokusatsu	October 2, 1973 - March 26, 1974
Ultraman Taro	TBS	April 6	tokusatsu	April 6, 1973 – April 5, 1974

== Ongoing shows ==
- Music Fair, music (1964-present)
- Mito Kōmon, jidaigeki (1969-2011)
- Sazae-san, anime (1969-present)
- Ōedo Sōsamō, jidaigeki (1970-1984)
- Ōoka Echizen, jidaigeki (1970-1999)
- Sasuga no Sarutobi, anime (1972-1974)
- Star Tanjō!, talent (1971-1983)
- Dokonjō Gaeru, anime (1972–1974)
- Mazinger Z, anime (1972–1974)
- Science Ninja Team Gatchaman, anime (1972–1974)

== Endings ==
Show	Station	Ending Date	Genre	Original Run
Android Kikaider	NET	July 8	tokusatsu	July 8, 1972 – May 5, 1973
Astroganger	Nippon TV	October 4	anime	October 4, 1972 – March 28, 1973
Doraemon	Nippon TV	September 30	anime	April 1, 1973 - September 30, 1973
Devilman	NET	July 8	anime	July 8, 1972 – April 7, 1973
Fireman	Nippon TV	July 31	tokusatsu	January 17, 1973 – July 31, 1973
Fuun Lion-Maru	Fuji TV	September 29	tokusatsu	April 14, 1973 – September 29, 1973
Ike! Godman	Nippon TV	October 5	tokusatsu	October 5, 1972 - April 10, 1973
Iron King	TBS	October 8	tokusatsu	October 8, 1972 – April 8, 1973
Jumborg Ace	NET	January 17	tokusatsu	January 17, 1973 – December 29, 1973
Kaiketsu Lion-Maru	Fuji TV	April 7	tokusatsu	April 1, 1972 - April 7, 1973
Key Hunter	TBS	April 7	drama	April 6, 1968 - April 7, 1973
Kamen Rider	MBS	February 10	tokusatsu	April 3, 1971 – February 10, 1973
Meteor Man Zone	Nippon TV	September 24	tokusatsu	April 2, 1973 – September 24, 1973
Mokku of the Oak Tree	Fuji TV	January 4	anime	January 4, 1972 - January 1, 1973
Robot Detective	Fuji TV	September 27	anime	April 5, 1973 – September 27, 1973
Rocky Chuck the Mountain Rat	Fuji TV	December 30	anime	January 7, 1973 – December 30, 1973
Tamagon the Counselor	Fuji TV	October 5	anime	October 5, 1972 – September 28, 1973
Ultraman Ace	TBS	March 30	tokusatsu	April 7, 1972 – March 30, 1973
Warrior of Love Rainbowman	NET	October 6	tokusatsu	October 6, 1972 – September 18, 1973
Wild 7	Nippon TV	October 9	drama	October 9, 1972 – March 26, 1973

== See also ==
- 1973 in anime
- 1973 in Japan
- List of Japanese films of 1973
