= Katsumasa Uchida =

Japanese actor (1944–2020)

- Born: 19 September 1944; Chiba Prefecture, Japan
- Died: 31 January 2020 (aged 75); Tokyo, Japan
- Occupation: Actor
- Years active: 1968-2020

Katsumasa Uchida (内田勝正, Uchida Katsmasa; 19 September 1944 – 31 January 2020) was a Japanese actor. He is most famous for playing villains and appeared in many jidaigeki and detective television dramas as a guest. Uchida graduated from Aoyama Gakuin University. In 1968, he joined Yukio Mishima's Roman Gekijo Theatre Company. Uchida made 68 appearances as a guest on Mito Kōmon.

On January 31, 2020, at 4:33 p.m., Uchida died of liver cancer.

== Filmography ==
=== Film ===
- Sukeban (1971) - Mikami
- Sex & Fury (1973) - Gentarô Kanô
- Boso sekkusu-zoku (1973)
- Sukeban: Taiman Shobu (1974) - Isozaki
- ESPY (1974) - Gorou Tatsumati
- Wakai kizoku-tachi: 13-kaidan no Maki (1975) - Nina Nakaoka
- Terror of Mechagodzilla (1975) - Interpol Agent Jiro Murakoshi
- Champion of Death (1975)
- Karate Bearfighter (1975)
- Hatsukoi (1975) - Agawa
- Andô Noboru no waga tôbô to sex no kiroku (1976) - Hideo Shindo
- Never Give Up (1978)
- G.I. Samurai (1979) - Asaba Yorichika
- Ninja bugeicho momochi sandayu (1980) - Shiranui Gennosuke
- Shogun's Ninja (1983)
- Ebarake no hitobito (1991)
- Senso e iko yo!! (1994)
- Senso e iko yo!! 2 (1994)
- Samurai Marathon (2019)

=== Television drama ===
- Hissatsu Shiokinin (1972, episode 4, Guest starring)
- Taiyō ni Hoero! (1973-1985, episode 39, 61, 223, 411, 638, Guest starring)
- Mito Kōmon (1973-2011, 68 appearances) - Guest
- Tasukenin Hashiru (1974, episode 4, 17, 33, Guest starring)
- Katsu Kaishū (1974) - Imuda Shōhei
- Hissatsu Shiokiya Kagyō (1975, episode 21, Guest starring)
- G-Men '75 (1977–1981, episode 118, 160, 201, 256, 307, Guest starring)
- Shin Hissatsu Shiokinin (1977, episode 21, Guest starring)
- Hissatsu Karakurinin Fugakuhiyakkei Koroshitabi (1978, episode 4 Guest starring)
- Abarenbō Shōgun (1978–2002, 28 appearances) - Guest
- Seibu Keisatsu (1981–84, 6 appearances))
- Akō Rōshi (1979) - Izawa shinnosuke
- Tokugawa Ieyasu (1983) - Yasumasa Sakakibara
- Nobunaga King of Zipangu (1992) - Asayama Nichijo
- Unmeitōge (1993)
