= Zubat =

Zubat may refer to:

- Zubatto, a Japanese onomatopoeia referring to the sound of something that is hit directly on its target
- Zubat (Pokémon), a fictional species from the Pokémon series
- Kaiketsu Zubat, Japanese television series
