= Tarō Bonten =

Japanese manga artist and tattooist

Tarō Bonten (梵天太郎, Bonten Tarō) (5 January 1928 – 30 June 2008), pen name of Kiyomi Ishii (石井 きよみ, Ishii Kiyomi) was a Japanese manga artist, illustrator, tattooist and designer. He was author of shōjo and gekiga stories, published between the 1950 and 1970s. Some of his stories have been adapted into film.

== Biography ==
Tarō Bonten was born Kiyomi Ishii on 5 January 1928 in Tokyo. In 1943 he joined a Special Attack Unit of the Imperial Japanese Army Air Service, stationed at Kanoya Airbase, guiding kamikaze pilots. After the war, disillusioned, he enrolled at the Kyoto Art College, current Kyoto University of the Arts. To pay for the tuition, he worked as an assistant of kamishibai artist Koji Kada. In 1948, in answer to a newspaper advertisement published by Katsuichi Nagai (later editor-in-chief of Garo magazine) he published his first akahon manga. In 1955 he published Shiro Kujaku (白孔雀; The White Peacock), his first manga under the name Tarō Bonten.

Around the 1950s, while studying at the university and staying at a boarding house in Kyoto, he met a neighbouring tattoo artist and became interested in the artform. Between 1958 and 1961 he published several manga in girls' magazines such as Shueisha's Shōjo Book and Akita Shoten's Hitomi.

After 1961, discontinuing his serialization in a monthly manga magazine, Bonten led a nomadic lifestyle, traveling around Japan, continuing his tattoo practice "with a needle in a hand and a guitar in the other". After the gekiga boom of the mid-1960s, he returned publishing comics.

One of his most popular manga of the period was the sukeban story Konketsuji Rika (混血児リカ; Rika, the Mixed-Blood Girl) serialised from 1969 to 1973 at Shueisha's Weekly Myōjo (週刊明星). The manga was adapted into a film in 1972 by Toho studios. Other of his manga, Inoshika ocho (猪の鹿お蝶), was also adapted into the 1973 film Sex & Fury. After 1973, he stopped drawing manga, dedicating himself only to tattooing.

While traveling to the United States, Bonten was introduced to the tattoo machine, and started employing it, as well as other colours to irezumi, which employed only black and red. He aimed to remove the stigma of tattoo being associated to yakuza and crime. Bonten associated with fashion designers, such as Kansai Yamamoto and helped design a ring gown for Muhammad Ali in 1972.

Bonten established himself in Okinawa in the 1990s, where he opened a tattoo school. He died in 2008.

Some of his works have been collected and published in English, French and Italian.
