= Girl Boss Guerilla =

- Theatrical release poster
- Directed by: Norifumi Suzuki
- Written by: Takayuki Minagawa; Norifumi Suzuki
- Produced by: Kanji Amao
- Starring: Miki Sugimoto; Reiko Ike
- Cinematography: Shigeru Akatsuka
- Edited by: Tadao Kanda
- Music by: Toshiaki Tsushima
- Distributed by: Toei
- Release date: August 12, 1972
- Running time: 84 minutes
- Country: Japan
- Language: Japanese

Girl Boss Guerilla (女番長ゲリラ, Sukeban gerira) is a 1972 Japanese film in the sukeban (delinquent girl) subgenre of Toei's "pinky violence" style of pink film. The third in the seven-film Girl Boss series, it was directed by Norifumi Suzuki and starred Miki Sugimoto and Reiko Ike.

== Cast ==
- Miki Sugimoto
- Reiko Ike
- Emi Jō (城恵美)

== Critical response ==
Allmovie critic Donald Guarisco calls Girl Boss Guerilla a "prototypical example of Japan's homegrown 'pinky violence' genre," adding "Miki Sugimoto and Reiko Ike make for charismatic and believable 'tough gal' leads, Suzuki directs the film with vigor, and the finished film benefits from the high production values and slickness inherent to Japanese exploitation films of this era." He warns that the film "isn't for all tastes, mainly because the eroticized S & M torture scenes might make some viewers squirm. Also, the film features sudden bursts of slapstick comedy that will leave others scratching their heads in confusion." Guarisco concludes that the film "is a schlocky item with limited appeal, but its eccentric, full-throttle style is guaranteed to please its target audience."

Dvdmaniacs.net singles out Sugimoto's performance for praise, and says of the film, "Plenty of topless biker girl action, some killer fight scenes, a great score and even a few cool scenes with vintage motorbikes make this one a complete blast. Fast paced with plenty of period kitsch... coupled with the plentiful amount of naked ladies make the movie a visual treat, and the story clicks along at such a great pace that it's not dull, even for a second."

== Availability ==
On December 6, 2005, Girl Boss Guerilla was released on region-1 DVD as part of the 4-disc Pinky Violence Collection box set released by Panik House. The DVD was given an individual release on October 31, 2006. Extras on the disc included the original theatrical trailer, poster and still images, and a commentary by New Texture.com's Wyatt Doyle (columnist for Asian Cult Cinema magazine), and Panik House president, Matt Kennedy.
