= Red Peony Gambler =

1968 film directed by Kōsaku Yamashita

- Theatrical release poster
- Directed by: Kōsaku Yamashita
- Screenplay by: Norifumi Suzuki
- Produced by: Koji Shundo; Gorō Kusakabe; Masao Sato
- Starring: Junko Fuji; Tomisaburo Wakayama; Ken Takakura
- Cinematography: Osamu Furuya
- Edited by: Shintaro Miyamoto
- Music by: Takeo Watanabe
- Production company: Toei
- Distributed by: Toei
- Release date: September 14, 1968 (Japan)
- Running time: 98 minutes
- Country: Japan
- Language: Japanese

Red Peony Gambler (Japanese: 緋牡丹博徒, Hepburn: Hibotan Bakuto) is a 1968 Japanese yakuza film directed by Kōsaku Yamashita. It stars Junko Fuji in her first leading role, and was a big hit. The film is the first installment in the Red Peony Gambler series, which is composed of seven sequels.

== Synopsis ==
When the head of the Yano yakuza family is assassinated, his daughter Oryu dissolves the clan and embarks on a journey to find her father's killer.

== Cast ==
- Junko Fuji as Ryuko Yano, better known as Red Peony Oryu
- Tomisaburo Wakayama as Boss Kumatora
- Kyosuke Machida as Fujimatsu, the Immortal
- Nijiko Kiyokawa as Otaka
- Ken Takakura as Katagiri
- Rinichi Yamamoto as Fugushin
- Isamu Dobashi as Minagawa
- Yuriko Mishima as Kimika
- Masaru Shiga as Kame
- Kōjirō Kawanami as Tajima
- Masako Araki as Otatsu
- Kunio Hikita as Takizawa
- Yaeko Wakamizu as Kumasaka
- Kyōnosuke Murai as Senzō Yano
- Minoru Ōki as Kakuai
- Shingo Yamashiro as Kichitarō
- Nobuo Kaneko as Boss Iwatsu

== Production ==
Red Peony Gambler was conceived by Toei's Shigeru Okada to compete with Daiei's successful female-led yakuza film series Woman Gambler, which began in 1966 and starred Kyoko Enami. Junko Fuji, daughter of Toei producer Koji Shundo, was cast as the film's lead. It was her first leading role, despite having been in 50 of the company's prior films. According to Patrick Macias, although the film features Fuji's character playing chō-han, women were traditionally not allowed to play the gambling game.

Screenwriter Norifumi Suzuki said that planning and preparation for a sequel to Red Peony Gambler was about 70% complete before the first film was even released.

== Release ==
In 2024, a 4K restoration of Red Peony Gambler was released in a Blu-ray box set with its first two sequels by Eureka Entertainment in the United Kingdom as part of the Masters of Cinema series, and by Film Movement in North America.

== Reception ==
The success of the first Red Peony Gambler film made Junko Fuji a star. In 1974, Paul Schrader called her the yakuza film genre's most popular female lead and one of the genre's three biggest actors, alongside her male co-stars Ken Takakura and Koji Tsuruta. He also wrote that Western cinema has no equivalent to the Oryu character; "a gracious, polite woman who, given the proper circumstances, can exact violent physical revenge upon the man who oppress her without ever losing her sense of femininity." Toei's Sister Street Fighter series starring Etsuko Shihomi was created when Okada directed Suzuki to create a "karate version" of the Red Peony Gambler series in order to capitalize on the martial arts film boom.

In a review of Eureka's box set of the first three Red Peony Gambler films, David Brook of Blueprint: Review found each one to be "deeply engrossing and dramatically satisfying, even when threatening to get melodramatic" and gave the first installment four out of five stars. He compared them to the Zatoichi series and wrote that although the shell of each story is familiar, their scripts effectively balance a large cast of characters and entangled subplots with "well-refined storytelling that gives each character their dues". Brook expressed appreciation for how the films treat women, particularly through the depiction of their chief protagonist, opining that the traditionally feminine or maternal aspects that often break through in the character are shown to be part of her strength and often make her a more honorable and chivalrous yakuza than her male contemporaries. However, he found Tomisaburo Wakayama's comedic performance clashed with the otherwise quite serious tone of the series. Movie Jawn's Christopher La Vigna praised Red Peony Gambler as gorgeously shot and beautifully scored, and Junko Fuji's performance as "masterful-always poised, graceful, and powerful".

== Sequels and spinoffs ==
| Year | Film | Other Titles | Director |
|---|---|---|---|
| 1968 | Red Peony Gambler: Gambler's Obligation; Hibotan Bakuto Isshuku Ippan (緋牡丹博徒 一宿一飯, lit. 'Red Peony Gambler: One Night's Lodging, One Meal') | — | Norifumi Suzuki |
| 1969 | Red Peony Gambler: The Flower Cards Game; Hibotan Bakuto Hanafuda Shōbu (緋牡丹博徒 花札勝負) | — | Tai Kato |
| 1969 | Red Peony Gambler: Second Generation Ceremony; Hibotan Bakuto Nidaime Shūmei (緋牡丹博徒 二代目襲名) | — | Shigehiro Ozawa |
| 1969 | Red Peony Gambler: Biography of a Gambling Hall; Hibotan Bakuto Tekkaba Retsuden (緋牡丹博徒 鉄火場列伝) | — | Kōsaku Yamashita |
| 1970 | Red Peony Gambler: Oryu's Return; Hibotan Bakuto Oryū Sanjō (緋牡丹博徒 お竜参上) | Gambles Her Life | Tai Kato |
| 1971 | Red Peony Gambler: You are Dead; Hibotan Bakuto Oinochi Itadakimasu (緋牡丹博徒 お命戴きます) | Death to the Wicked | Tai Kato |
| 1972 | Red Peony Gambler: Execution of Duty; Hibotan Bakuto Jingi Tōshimasu (緋牡丹博徒 仁義通します) | To Side with Duty | Buichi Saitō |

In 1970, Wakayama's character in the Red Peony Gambler series, Boss Kumatora, was given a two film spinoff series titled Silk Hat Boss (シルクハットの大親分, Shiruku Hatto no Dai Oyabun), which also features Fuji as Oryu.
