= Nagasaki Hankachō =

Japanese TV drama series

- Also known as: 長崎犯科帳
- Genre: Jidaigeki
- Directed by: Keiichi Ozawa; Tokuzō Tanaka
- Starring: Yorozuya Kinnosuke; Shōhei Hino; Kunie Tanaka; Miki Sugimoto
- Country of origin: Japan
- Original language: Japanese
- No. of episodes: 26

Production
- Producer: Atsuo Kato
- Running time: 45 minutes (per episode)
- Production company: Toei

Original release
- Network: Nippon TV
- Release: April 6 – September 28, 1975

Nagasaki Hankachō (長崎犯科帳) is a Japanese television jidaigeki or period drama that was broadcast in 1975.

== Plot ==
The drama depicts the late Edo period in Nagasaki. Hiramatsu takes up Nagasaki bugyō's head post. He likes alcohol and women. He is willing to accept a bribe from villains who consider it easy to manipulate him. But he is just pretending to be an idiot and he kills villains who escape justice despite their crimes.

== Shadow shogun ==
According to Shirō Nakano, Kakuei Tanaka, a former Japanese prime minister, and his secretary, Shigezō Hayasaka, coined the term shadow shogun while watching this series. It was adapted from yami bugyō ("shadow magistrate"), a term used for Hiramatsu, with bugyō replaced by shogun as a title more appropriate for a prime minister.

== Cast ==
- Yorozuya Kinnosuke: Hiramatsu Chūshirō
- Kunie Tanaka: Dr.Kogure Ryojun
- Shōhei Hino: Sanji
- Midori Hagimura : Ogin
- Miki Sugimoto : Ofumi
- Katsutoshi Arata : Kada
- Keiji Takamine : Inomata Yasubei
- Shinsuke Mikimoto : Mishima Yogorō
- Hiroyuki Ota : Sawada Kazuma

== Sources ==
- Nakano, Shirō (20 December 1982). 田中政権・886日 [The Tanaka Government: 886 Days] (in Japanese). Gyōsei Mondai Kenkyūjo Shuppankyoku. doi:10.11501/12283268.
