= Torakku Yarō =

Action comedy film series

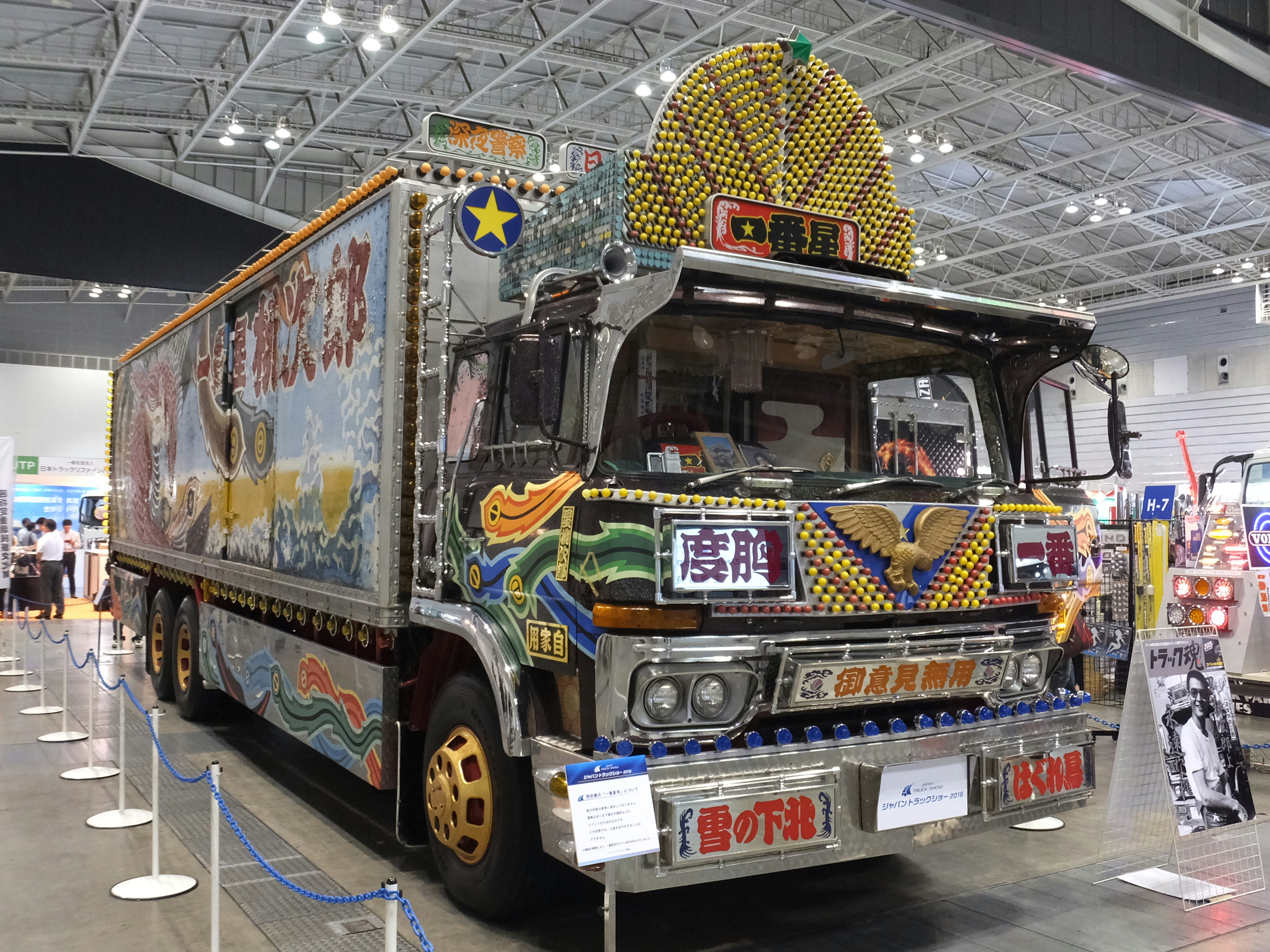
Main character Momojiro Hoshi's truck "Ichibanboshi" (10th work "Hometown Express" version, exhibited at Japan Truck Show 2016)

Truck Yarō (トラック野郎, Torakku Yarō; lit. "Truck Guys" or "Truck Rascals") is a series of ten Japanese action comedy films produced by Toei and released from 1975 to 1979. All ten films in the series were directed by Norifumi Suzuki and starred Bunta Sugawara as Momojiro Hoshi ("Ichibanboshi" or "first star") and Kinya Aikawa as Kinzo Matsushita, also known as "Jonathan". The title Torakku Yaro means "truck guys" or "truck rascals", and the films involve two truckers and their various escapades as they travel around Japan in highly decorated trucks.

The plot formula is similar to the Otoko wa Tsurai yo films. Each time Momojiro falls in love with a woman (the "Madonna") and then ends up having to help her romance with another man. The stories end with Momojiro having to race his truck to meet a deadline to rejoin the couple.

== Regulars ==
Momojiro Hoshi, nicknamed "Ichibanboshi", played by Bunta Sugawara.

Kinzo Matsushita, nicknamed "Yamome no Jonathan", played by Kinya Aikawa.

Kimie Matsushita, the wife of Kinzo Matsushita, played by Masumi Harukawa

== Films ==
No.	Subtitle	In Japanese	Date	Female lead ("Madonna")	Other cast
1	Go-iken Muyō	御意見無用	1975	Yutaka Nakajima	Rikiya Yasuoka, Ryudo Uzaki and the Down Town Boogie Woogie Band
2	Bakusō Ichibanboshi	爆走一番星	1975	Shizue Abe	
3	Bōkyō Ichibanboshi	望郷一番星	1976	Yoko Shimada	
4	Tenka Gomen	天下御免	1976	Kaoru Yumi	
5	Dokyō Ichibanboshi	度胸一番星	1977	Nagisa Katahira	
6	Otoko Ippiki Momojirō	男一匹桃次郎	1977	Masako Natsume	Yoshi Katō, Masaaki Sakai, Tomisaburo Wakayama, Kentaro Shimizu
7	Totsugeki Ichibanboshi	突撃一番星	1978	Mieko Harada	
8	Ichibanboshi Kita e Kaeru	一番星北へ帰る	1978	Naoko Otani	
9	Neppū 5000 Kiro	熱風5000キロ	1979	Miyuki Ono	
10	Furusato Tokkyūbin	故郷特急便	1979	Sayuri Ishikawa, Aiko Morishita	

== Theme music ==
All the films have the same theme song, Ichibanboshi Blues by Ryudo Uzaki and Yoko Aki performed by the Down Town Boogie Woogie Band.
