= Yumi Takigawa =

Japanese actress and singer (born 1951)

- 多岐川 裕美
- Born: 16 February 1951 (age 75); Tokyo, Japan
- Occupation: Actress
- Years active: 1974–present
- Spouse: Shinsuke Achiwa (m. 1984; div. 1997)
- Children: Hanako Takigawa

Yumi Takigawa (多岐川 裕美, Takigawa Yumi; born 16 February 1951) is a Japanese actress and singer. She has appeared in more than 50 films since 1974.

== Personal life ==
In August 1984, Takigawa married her manager, Shinsuke Achiwa, and she gave birth to her only daughter, actress Hanako Takigawa. They divorced in 1997.

== Selected filmography ==
=== Film ===
Year	Title	Role	Notes
1974	School of the Holy Beast	Maya Takigawa	
1975	Champion of Death	Chiako	
1975	Karate Bearfighter	Chiako	
1975	Graveyard of Honor	Chieko Ishikawa	
1975	The Bullet Train	SAS Staff	
1980	Virus	Noriko	
1990	Ruten no umi		
1992	The Triple Cross	Misato	

=== Television ===
Year	Title	Role	Notes
1976	Kaze to Kumo to Niji to		Taiga drama
1979	Kusa Moeru		Taiga drama
1979	Oretachi wa Tenshi da!		
1984	Sanga Moyu	Emi (Hatanaka) Amo	Taiga drama
1986	Byakkotai	Matsudaira Teru	Miniseries
1987	Tabaruzaka	Aikana	Miniseries
2000	Rokubanme no Sayoko	Chika Sekine	
2007	The Family	Shino Tsuruta	
2022	Come Come Everybody	Old Yukie	Asadora

== Awards ==
Year	Award	Category	Nominated work(s)	Result	Ref.
1976	Elan d'or Awards	Newcomer of the Year	Herself	Won	
