= Shadow shogun =

Japanese term for a person who exercises power behind the scenes

In Japanese politics, a shadow shogun (闇将軍, yami shōgun) is a person who exercises effective control over an organization without formally serving as its leader. The term is used of politicians and other influential figures.

== Origin ==
According to Shirō Nakano, Kakuei Tanaka and his secretary, Shigezō Hayasaka, devised the nickname while watching television. It was adapted from yami bugyō ("shadow magistrate", a character in the 1975 Japanese TV series Nagasaki Hankachō), with bugyō replaced by shogun as a title more appropriate for a former prime minister. Played by Yorozuya Kinnosuke, the character was a Nagasaki magistrate who punished wrongdoers at night. According to Kichiya Kobayashi, the suggestion to raise the character's rank to shogun came from Hayasaka.

== Use in politics ==
=== Kakuei Tanaka ===
Tanaka was described as a shadow shogun after resigning as prime minister in December 1974. His faction remained the largest in the Liberal Democratic Party under his successor, Takeo Miki, allowing him to retain considerable influence despite his prosecution in the 1976 Lockheed scandal. In a 2015 retrospective, Taichi Sakaiya attributed the fall of the governments of Miki and Takeo Fukuda, and the formation of those of Masayoshi Ōhira and Zenkō Suzuki, to Tanaka's influence. The subsequent government of Yasuhiro Nakasone was nicknamed the "Tanakasone cabinet", combining Tanaka's and Nakasone's names. Sakaiya dated the end of Tanaka's period as a shadow shogun to Noboru Takeshita's break with the Tanaka faction in February 1985, the same month in which Tanaka fell ill.

The theatre company JACROW produced Yami no shōgun ("The Shadow Shogun"), a four-part cycle of plays about Tanaka written and directed by Nobuaki Nakamura. The works premiered between 2016 and 2020. In an interview, Nakamura said that he sought to portray both Tanaka's achievements and his failings. Nakamura received an individual Kinokuniya Theatre Award for 2020 for writing and directing the third instalment of the series. JACROW received the award for a theatre company in 2023 for productions that included the four-part cycle.

=== Ichirō Ozawa ===
The term has also been applied to Ichirō Ozawa. In an excerpt from the preface to his book Yami shōgun, reproduced by Kodansha, Kenya Matsuda characterised Ozawa and Hiromu Nonaka as the "last shadow shoguns" since Tanaka. In a November 2009 commentary in JBpress, Saburō Nagata described Ozawa, then secretary-general of the Democratic Party of Japan, as the effective power behind Yukio Hatoyama's government. Nagata argued that Hatoyama's deference to Ozawa prevented the prime minister's office from exercising effective leadership. The nickname was also used in an announcement on Ozawa's official website for his June 2020 appearance on the Abema programme Cunning Takeyama no Doyō The Night.

=== Shinzo Abe ===
After Shinzo Abe resigned as prime minister in 2020, commentary in President Online suggested that he could become a shadow shogun comparable to Tanaka. Following the 2021 Liberal Democratic Party leadership election, political scientist Masato Kamikubo described Abe as a "new shadow shogun" in Diamond Online. Kamikubo argued that Abe had helped secure Fumio Kishida's victory and had gained substantial influence over party and government funding, appointments and patronage through the leadership election and the subsequent allocation of party and cabinet posts.

== Other shadow shoguns ==
- Tōyama Mitsuru (1855–1944), Japanese politician and far-right activist
- Noboru Takeshita (1924–2000), Japanese politician and former Prime Minister
- Tsuneo Watanabe (1926–2024), Japanese journalist and newspaper executive

== See also ==
- Éminence grise
- Kingmaker
- Power behind the throne

== Sources ==
- "闇将軍" [Shadow shogun]. Digital Daijisen (in Japanese). Shogakukan – via Kotobank.
- "#34「闇の将軍」四部作" [No. 34: The Shadow Shogun, a four-part cycle]. JACROW (in Japanese).
- Kamikubo, Masato (5 October 2021). "「新・闇将軍」安倍晋三の誕生、岸田政権長期化で日本の右傾化が加速するか" [The emergence of Shinzo Abe as a new shadow shogun: Would a prolonged Kishida administration accelerate Japan's shift to the right?]. Diamond Online (in Japanese).
- "「第五十五回 紀伊國屋演劇賞」贈呈式の模様を公開いたします（2021年2月3日 紀伊國屋ホール）" [The 55th Kinokuniya Theatre Awards ceremony, held at Kinokuniya Hall on 3 February 2021] (in Japanese). Kinokuniya. 4 February 2021.
- "第五十八回 紀伊國屋演劇賞決定のお知らせ" [Announcement of the 58th Kinokuniya Theatre Awards] (PDF) (Press release) (in Japanese). Kinokuniya. 15 December 2023.
- Kobayashi, Kichiya (30 June 1983). 実録・角栄がゆく―三十六年間の全演説再録 [A Documentary Account of Kakuei's Career: His Complete Speeches over Thirty-Six Years] (in Japanese). Tokuma Shoten. ISBN 4-19-142745-8.
- Matsuda, Kenya (10 February 2003). "まえがき" [Preface]. 闇将軍：野中広務と小沢一郎の正体 [Shadow Shogun: The True Faces of Hiromu Nonaka and Ichirō Ozawa] (in Japanese). Kodansha. ISBN 978-4-06-211706-7.
- Nagata, Saburō (19 November 2009). "闇将軍・小沢幹事長の「暴走」 続・失速する鳩山政権" [Secretary-General Ozawa, the shadow shogun, runs out of control: The faltering Hatoyama government, continued]. JBpress (in Japanese).
- Nagatachō Confidential (6 November 2020). "｢10年後も闇将軍として君臨か｣首相を辞めてから活発に動く安倍氏の今後 宴席ではジョークも交え軽快トーク" [Could Abe still reign as a shadow shogun in ten years? His renewed activity after resigning as prime minister]. President Online (in Japanese).
- Nakano, Shirō (20 December 1982). 田中政権・886日 [The Tanaka Government: 886 Days] (in Japanese). Gyōsei Mondai Kenkyūjo Shuppankyoku. doi:10.11501/12283268.
- "『カンニング竹山の土曜The NIGHT』（ABEMA）出演のご案内" [Announcement of an appearance on Cunning Takeyama's Saturday The Night (Abema)]. Ichirō Ozawa official website (in Japanese). 19 June 2020.
- Sakaiya, Taichi (4 March 2015). "第２５回 「田中角栄」とは何だったのか" [Part 25: What did Kakuei Tanaka represent?]. Aera Digital (in Japanese).
- Yamada, Katsuhito (6 December 2023). "田中角栄没後30年…功罪2つの視点で描く舞台「闇の将軍」作・演出の中村ノブアキさんインタビュー" [Thirty years after Tanaka's death: An interview with Nobuaki Nakamura, writer and director of The Shadow Shogun, on portraying his achievements and failings]. Nikkan Gendai Digital (in Japanese).
