= Kōsaku Yamashita =

Japanese film director

- Born: 10 January 1930; Kagoshima Prefecture, Japan
- Died: 6 December 1998; Tokyo, Japan
- Other name: Shōgun
- Occupation: Film director
- Years active: 1955-1998

Kōsaku Yamashita (山下耕作, Yamashita Kōsaku; 10 December 1930 – 6 December 1998) was a Japanese film director who specialized in directing Yakuza films. Yamashita was nicknamed Shōgun. His son is director Tomohiko Yamashita.

In 1952, He graduated from Kyoto University and joined Toei Film. He was working an office job, but three years later, he became an assistant director under Tomu Uchida and Kōzaburō Yoshimura.

Yamashita made his directorial debut with Wakatono Senryu Hada in 1961. His representative works included The Valiant Red Peony series and Kyōdai Jingi (1966).

== Selected filmography ==
=== Film ===
- Wakatono Senryu Hada (1961)
- Kyōdai Jingi (1966)
- Big Time Gambling Boss (1968)
- The Vanity of the Shogun's Mistresses (1968)
- The Valiant Red Peony a.k.a. Hibotan Bakuto (1968)
- Zoro Me no San Kyōdai (1972)
- Yamaguchi-gumi Sandaime (1973)
- Yokosuka Naval Prison (1973)
- Yamaguchi-gumi gaiden: Kyushu Shinko-sakusen a.k.a. The Tattooed Hit Man
- Father of the Kamikaze (1974)
- Story of All-Out Attack a.k.a. Path of Japanese Chivalry (1975)
- Jail Breakers a.k.a. Datsō Yugi (1976)
- Gōtō Satsujin Shu (1976)
- Tokugawa Ichizoku no Hōukai (1980)
- Kaigenrei no yoru (1980)
- Shura no Mure (1984)
- The Last True Yakuza a.k.a. Saigo no Bakuto (1985)
- Night Train (1987)
- The Man Who Assassinated Ryoma (1987)
- Another Way (1988)
- Yakuza Ladies: The Final Battle (1990)
- Shin Gokudō no Tsumatachi Kakugoshiiya (1993)

=== Television ===
- Oshizamurai Kiichihōgan (1974) (ep.13)
- Hissatsu Shigotonin (1980) (ep.8)
- Choshichiro Edo Nikki (1983–91)
- Nemuri Kyōshirō Burai Hikae (1983)
- Katsu Kaishu (1990) (TV Film)
- Abare Hasshū Goyō Tabi (1991–94)
