= Jacques Pimpaneau =

French sinologist (1934–2021)

Jacques Pimpaneau (12 September 1934 – 2 November 2021) was a French scholar of Chinese. He was Chair of Chinese Language and Literature at INALCO, Paris.

== Biography ==
A specialist in Chinese language and civilization, Pimpaneau discovered China in 1958. Unlike many intellectuals of his time, he was not fascinated by the Maoist regime. An independent personality, close to situationists and anarchists, he distinguished himself from academic sinology.

Pimpaneau studied at Peking University from 1958 to 1960. He became a professor at Institut national des langues et civilisations orientales (INALCO), Paris, where he held the Chair of Chinese Language and Literature from 1963 to 1999. From 1968 to 1971, he was also a lecturer at the Chinese University of Hong Kong, where he was a colleague of the Belgian sinologist Pierre Ryckmans (the future Simon Leys). Pimpaneau was at the centre of meetings between sinologists and radical Situationist theorists, such as his former student, René Viénet. Pimpaneau participated in 1976 in the documentary: Chinois, encore un effort pour être révolutionnaires!, directed by René Viénet.

In 1972, Pimpaneau created the Musée Kwok On, an Asian arts museum, in Paris, the collections of which are now in the Oriente Fundçãco Museum do Oriente (Museum of the Orient) in Lisbon.

Pimpaneau was the secretary of Jean Dubuffet. He was also close to Georges Bataille at the end of his life, being one of the few present at the time of his death and burial in Vézelay in 1962.

In 2019, Pimpaneau donated his personal library to the Chinese collection of the municipal library of Lyon.

== Selected publications ==
=== Books ===
- Promenade au jardin des poiriers. L'Opéra chinois classique, Éditions Kwok On, 1983.
  - Revised and expanded edition: Chine: l'Opéra chinois classique. Promenade au jardin des poiriers, Les Belles Lettres, 2014.
- Chine: Histoire de la littérature, Philippe Picquier, 1989, revised 2004.
- Mémoires de la cour céleste, Éditions Kwok On, 1995.
  - Revised and expanded edition: Chine: Mythes et dieux, Philippe Picquier, 1999.
- Dans un jardin de Chine, Collection Picquier poche no 213, Philippe Picquier, 1999.
- Lettre à une jeune fille qui voudrait partir en Chine, Collection Picquier poche no 222, Philippe Picquier, 2003.
- Chine: Culture et traditions, Nouvelle édition revue et corrigée, Philippe Picquier, 2004.
- Célébration de l'ivresse: Collection Écrits dans la paume de la main, Philippe Picquier, 2000.
- À deux jeunes filles qui voudraient comprendre la religion des chinois, Philippe Picquier, 2010.
- Chroniques sanglantes de Chinoises amoureuses, Éditions Espaces et signes, 2014.
- Le tour de Chine en 80 ans, Éditions de l'Insomniaque, 2017.

=== Articles ===
- "Différences ou ressemblances", Extrême-Orient, Extrême-Occident, 1986, vol.8, no.8, pp. 111–122.

=== Translations from Chinese to French ===
- Des royaumes en proie à la perdition (Histoire des Zhou orientaux 東周列國志)
- Biographie des regrets éternels, Philippe Picquier, 1989.
- Morceaux choisis de la prose classique chinoise, (2 vols) Librairie You Feng, 1998.
- Anthologie de la littérature chinoise classique, Philippe Picquier, 2004.
- Les mémoires historiques de Se-ma Ts'ien, 9 vols, You Feng, 2015.

== See also ==
- George Bataille
- René Viénet
- French School of the Far East
- Commemorating Jacques Pimpaneau (1934-2021) - by John Minford
