= Karate Bearfighter =

- Film poster for Karate Bearfighter.
- Directed by: Kazuhiko Yamaguchi
- Starring: Sonny Chiba; Jun Fujimaki; Yumi Takigawa; Yutaka Nakajima
- Music by: Shunsuke Kikuchi
- Distributed by: Toei Company
- Release date: December 27, 1975 (Japan)
- Running time: 87 minutes
- Country: Japan
- Language: Japanese

Karate Bearfighter (Japanese: けんか空手 極真無頼拳, Hepburn: Kenka karate kyokushin burai ken; lit. Fighting Karate-Brutal Ultimate Truth Fist) is a Japanese martial arts film made by Toei Company in 1975 and directed by Kazuhiko Yamaguchi. It is the second installment of a trilogy of films based on the manga Karate Baka Ichidai (literal title: "A Karate-Crazy Life") by Ikki Kajiwara, Jiro Tsunoda and Jōya Kagemaru.

Sonny Chiba reprises his role from Champion of Death as Masutatsu Oyama, the historical founder of Kyokushin karate in Japan (Oyama makes a cameo appearance in the film as well). Chiba had studied martial arts under the real-life Oyama for several years. True to the film's title, at one point in the course of the narrative he battles a "bear", actually a human actor in a bear costume.

== Cast ==
- Sonny Chiba as Mas Oyama
- Eiji Gô
- Yutaka Nakajima
