= Hiroshi Miyauchi =

Japanese actor (born 1947)

Miyauchi Hiroshi
- 宮内 洋
- Born: June 14, 1947 (age 78); Chiba, Japan
- Occupations: Actor, talent
- Years active: 1969–present
- Height: 179 cm (5 ft 10 in)
- Website: https://www.miyauchihiroshi.com/works

Hiroshi Miyauchi (宮内 洋, Miyauchi Hiroshi; born June 14, 1947) is a Japanese actor and talent from Chiba Prefecture. Miyauchi graduated from Nihon University. In 1969, he signed with Toei Company and made his film debut with Nagasaki Blues. He first attracted attention after landing a role in a television series, in Key Hunter on TBS.

He is best known for playing some of the most memorable roles in Tokusatsu history, such as Akira Shinmei/Aoranger in Himitsu Sentai Goranger, Soukichi Banba/Big One in the Sentai series J.A.K.Q. Dengekitai, Chief Councillor Naoyuki Miura in Chouriki Sentai Ohranger, Shiro Kazami in Kamen Rider V3 (in which he also sang the opening theme for) and Ken Hayakawa in Kaiketsu Zubat.

== Appearances ==
=== Film ===
- 1969: Nagasaki Blues
- 1969: Yakuza's Law: Yakuza Keibatsushi: Rinchi as Shikichi
- 1971: Soshiki Bōryoku Kyodaijingi as Girl Boss's yakuza boyfriend
- 1971: Gendai poruno-den: Sentensei inpu as Yôichirô / Yuki's boyfriend
- 1972: Mesubachi no chosen as Eizô Tsuyuki
- 1972: Mayaku baishun G-Men
- 1973: Sukeban as Tatsuo Teyogi
- 1973: Kamen Rider V3 vs Destron Monsters as Shiro Kazami "Kamen Rider V3"
- 1974: Five Riders vs. King Dark as Shirou Kazami "Kamen Rider V3" (voice)
- 1974: Onna hissatsu ken as Li Mansei
- 1976: Himitsu Sentai Goranger: The Bomb Hurricane (Short) as Akira Shinmei "Aorenger"
- 1977: Sugata Sanshiro
- 1977: The War in Space as Morrei
- 1978: J.A.K.Q. Dengekitai vs. Gorenger (Short) as Sokichi Banba "Big One" / Akira Shinmei "Aorenger" (voice only)
- 1978: The Fall of Ako Castle
- 1979: Aftermath of Battles Without Honor and Humanity
- 1979: Sanada Yukimura no Bōryaku as Chosogabe Morichika
- 1981: Kamen Rider Super-1: The Movie as Shirou Kazami "Kamen Rider V3" (voice only)
- 1982: To Trap a Kidnapper
- 1984: Fireflies in the North
- 1984: Shura no mure
- 1987: Tokyo Blackout
- 1993: Za kakuto oh as Mr. Oshiro
- 1995: Tokyo Mafia as Hanada
- 1995: Chouriki Sentai Ohranger: The Movie (1995) as Chief Councillor Naoyuki Miura
- 1996: Tokyo Mafia 2 as Hanada
- 1996: Makai tenshô: mado-hen as Musashi Miyamoto
- 1999: Makai tenshô: The Armageddon as Musashi Miyamoto
- 2005: Kamen Rider: The First as Tobei Tachibana
- 2009: Chikashitsu
- 2011: OOO, Den-O, All Riders: Let's Go Kamen Riders as Shirou Kazami/Kamen Rider V3, Ken Hayakawa/Zubat (both voice only)
- 2011: Gokaiger Goseiger Super Sentai 199 Hero Great Battle as Soukichi Banba/Big One, Akira Shinmei/Aorenger (Voice Only)
- 2012: Till the Death Do Us Apart Part I
- 2012: Till the Death Do Us Apart Part II
- 2012: Happiness in a Little Place

==== Direct-to-video movies ====
- Chouriki Sentai Ohranger: Ole vs Kakuranger (1996) as Chief Councillor Naoyuki Miura
- Gekisou Sentai Carranger vs. Ohranger (1997) as Chief Councillor Naoyuki Miura
- Hyakujuu Sentai Gaoranger vs. Super Sentai (2001) as Soukichi Banba / Big One

=== Television ===
- 1968: Key Hunter as Shunsuke Dan
- 1971: Keiji Kun
- 1973: Kamen Rider V3 (regular) as Shirou Kazami "Kamen Rider V3"
- 1974: Kamen Rider X (eps. 27, 28, 33 & 34) as Shirou Kazami "Kamen Rider V3"
- 1974: Tasukenin Hashiru as Shimagaeri no Ryu
- 1975: Himitsu Sentai Gorenger (regular) as Akira Shinmei "AoRanger"
- 1975: Kamen Rider Stronger (eps. 35, 37 and 39) as Shirou Kazami "Kamen Rider V3"
- 1976: All Together! Seven Kamen Riders!! (TV special) as Shirou Kazami "Kamen Rider V3"
- 1977: J.A.K.Q. Dengekitai (eps. 23-35) as Soukichi Banba "Big One"
- 1977: Kaiketsu Zubat (regular) as Ken Hayakawa "Zubat"
- 1978: Spider-man (eps. 31 & 39) as Narcotics Officer Go Tachibana
- 1978: Abarenbo Shogun as Sukehachi
- 1979: G-Men '75 as Kazuhiko Shimaya
- 1979: The Yagyu Conspiracy (ep. 39)
- 1980: Kamen Rider Skyrider (eps. 23 (Voice Only), 34 & 35) as Shirou Kazami "Kamen Rider V3"
- 1982: Uchuu Keiji Gavan (eps. 30 & 31) as Space Sheriff Alan
- 1984: Birth of the 10th! Kamen Riders All Together!! (TV special) as Shirou Kazami "Kamen Rider V3"
- 1985: Sanada Taiheiki - Mōri Katsunaga
- 1990: Tokkei Winspector (regular) as Head of Department Shunsuke Masaki
- 1991: Tokkyuu Shirei Solbrain (regular) as Head of Department Shunsuke Masaki
- 1992: Tokusou Exceedraft (eps. 47-49) as Police Official Shunsuke Masaki
- 1995: Chouriki Sentai Ohranger (regular) as Chief Councillor Naoyuki Miura
- 2019: Tokusatsu GaGaGa (cameo in ep. 7) as Book store owner

== Song ==
- Fight! Masked Rider V3 (Tatakae! Kamen Rider V3) Kamen Rider V3
- Horizon Of Two Men (Futari no chiheisen) Kaiketsu Zubat
- Spark The Fire In Your Eyes! (Moyase hitomi wo) Tokkei Winspector

== Name ==
Although they have the name pronounced in the same way, the actor Hiroshi Miyauchi (宮内 洋) isn't the videogame musician Hiroshi Miyauchi (宮内博史), from Sega SST Band.
