= Sumiko Fuji =

Japanese actress (born 1945)

- 富司 純子
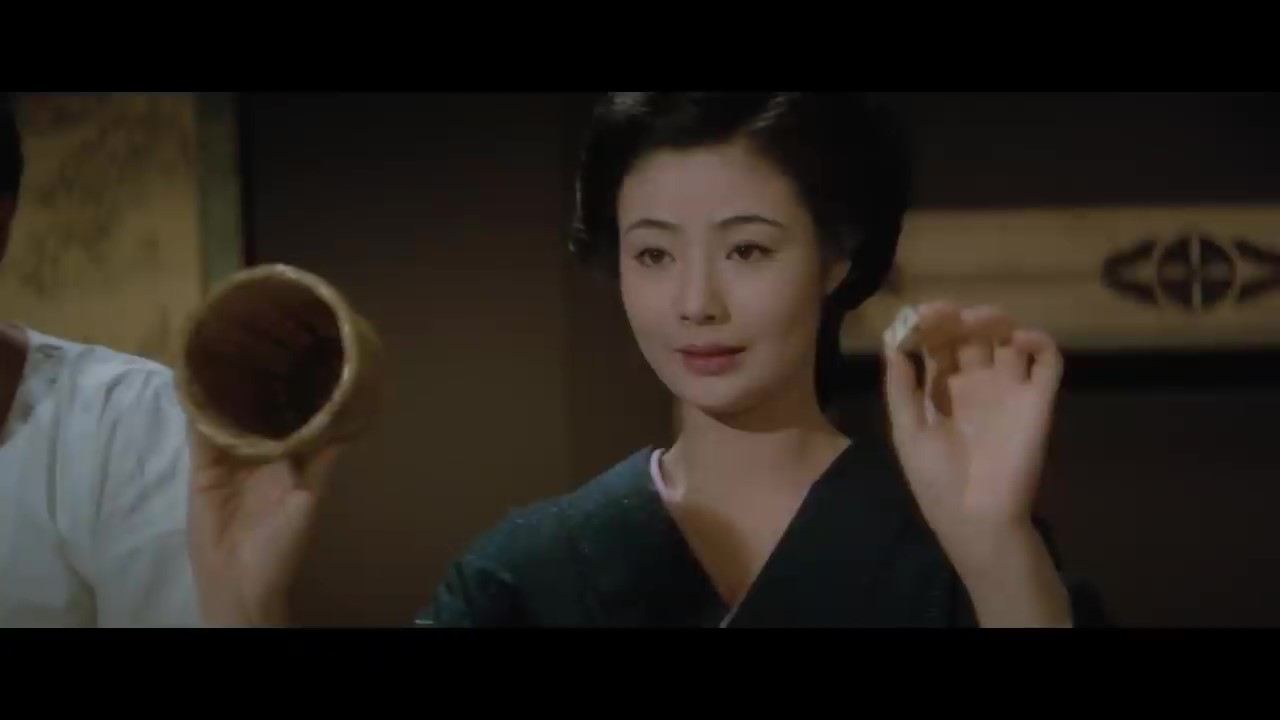
- Fuji in Nihon Kyōkakuden: Hana to Ryū (1969)
- Born: Junko Shundo (俊藤 純子); December 1, 1945 (age 80); Gobō, Wakayama, Japan
- Other name: Junko Fuji
- Occupation: Actress
- Years active: 1963–present
- Spouse: Onoe Kikugorō VII
- Children: Shinobu Terajima; Onoe Kikugorō VIII

Junko Terashima (Japanese: 寺島 純子, Hepburn: Terashima Junko; born 1 December 1945), known professionally as Sumiko Fuji (富司 純子, Fuji Sumiko), is a Japanese actress. She began acting in the 1960s under the name Junko Fuji (藤 純子, Fuji Junko), becoming famous as the female lead in yakuza films opposite such stars as Kōji Tsuruta and Ken Takakura. She also starred in her own series as the sword-wielding gambler Red Peony Oryu in the Red Peony Gambler series. Initially retiring in 1972 after getting married, she began appearing on TV in 1974 under her real name. She later returned to films in 1989 using the name Sumiko Fuji, and expanded her acting repertoire. She won the Blue Ribbon Award for best supporting actress in 1999 and 2006. She is married to the kabuki actor Onoe Kikugorō VII and is the mother of the actress Shinobu Terajima and the kabuki actor Onoe Kikugorō VIII.

== Early life and career ==
Fuji was born in Wakayama as the third child and younger daughter of future film producer Koji Shundo. Her family eventually moved to Osaka, where, as a big fan of Takarazuka Revue, Fuji started to attend a dancing, singing and acting school during junior high. At 17 her family moved to Kyoto, shortly after which her and her older sister Nobuko started to appear on the local TV show Hai Hai, Mahinadesu. After visiting Toei's Kyoto studio, Fuji attracted the attention of director Masahiro Makino, who invited her to appear in one of his films. Although Shundo initially opposed his daughter entering show business, wanting a "normal" life for her instead, he acquiesced figuring it would be better she work for Toei instead of their rivals.

In 1963, Fuji made her film debut in Makino's Hashu Yukyoden: Otoko no Sakazuki, and went on to appear in 10 movies that year while making regular appearances on NHK and TV Asahi television dramas. Mark Schilling wrote that by the mid-1960s, Fuji was the leading actress for Toei, often playing the love interest for Kōji Tsuruta and Ken Takakura in Ninkyo eiga. But she reached her peak in popularity between 1968 and 1972, starring as a sword-wielding gambler in the Red Peony Gambler series of films. In 1972, Fuji married a kabuki actor she met while making the NHK drama Minamoto no Yoshitsune. After making Makino's Kanto Hizakura Ikka, she retired from acting that same year. Schilling wrote that the popularity of Ninkyo eiga subsequently declined, and a search for a successor failed.

== Selected filmography ==
=== Films ===
- 13 Assassins (1963)
- Hashu Yukyoden: Otoko no Sakazuki (八州遊侠伝 男の盃; 1963)
- Bakumatsu Zankoku Monogatari (幕末残酷物語; 1964)
- Onmitsu Kenshi (1964)
- Meiji Kyōkaku den: Sandaime Shūme (明治侠客伝三代目襲名; 1965)
- Bakuchiuchi Sōcho Tobaku (博奕打ち 総長賭博; 1968)
- Red Peony Gambler (緋牡丹博徒; 1968)
- Jinsei Gekijō: Hishakaku to Kiratsune (人生劇場 飛車角と吉良常; 1968)
- Red Peony Gambler: Gambler's Obligation (緋牡丹博徒 一宿一飯; 1968)
- Red Peony Gambler: The Flower Cards Game (緋牡丹博徒 花札勝負; 1969)
- Red Peony Gambler: Second Generation Ceremony (緋牡丹博徒 二代目襲名; 1969)
- Red Peony Gambler: Biography of a Gambling Hall (緋牡丹博徒 鉄火場列伝; 1969)
- Shōwa Zankyō den: Shinde Moraimasu (昭和残侠伝 死んで貰います; 1970)
- Red Peony Gambler: Oryu's Return (緋牡丹博徒 お竜参上; 1970)
- Red Peony Gambler: You are Dead (緋牡丹博徒 お命戴きます; 1971)
- Kanto Hizakura Ikka (関東緋桜一家; 1972)
- Red Peony Gambler: Execution of Duty (緋牡丹博徒 仁義通します; 1972)
- Chizuko's Younger Sister (1991)
- Wait and See (1998)
- The Geisha House (1999)
- Milk White (2004)
- Hula Girls (2006)
- The Inugamis (2006)
- Best Wishes for Tomorrow (2008)
- Air Doll (2009)
- Summer Wars (2009)
- Lady Maiko (2014)
- April Fools (2015)
- A Loving Husband (2017)
- Samurai's Promise (2018)
- Children of the Sea (2019), Dede (voice)
- A Garden of Camellias (2021), Kinuko
- DIVOC-12 (2021)

=== Television ===
- Minamoto no Yoshitsune (1966) - Shizuka Gozen
- Tobu ga Gotoku (1990) - Tenshōin
- Hōjō Tokimune (2001) - Matsushita Zen-ni
- Tenchijin (2009) - Kōdai-in Nene
- Teppan (2010–2011)
- A Day-Off of Ryoma Takeuchi (2020)

== Honours ==
- Kinuyo Tanaka Award (1999)
- Medal with Purple Ribbon (2007)
- Order of the Rising Sun, 4th Class, Gold Rays with Rosette (2016)
