= Mayumi Nagisa =

Japanese actress and singer (born 1944)

- 渚 まゆみ
- Born: Mayumi Tashiro; 10 October 1944 (age 81); Tokyo
- Other names: Mayumi Hamaguchi (real name)
- Occupations: Actress; singer
- Years active: 1961–
- Notable work: Yūyake Ko yake no Akatonbo (1961)
- Height: 155 cm (5 ft 1 in)

Mayumi Nagisa (渚 まゆみ, Nagisa Mayumi; real name Mayumi Hamaguchi (浜口 真弓, Hamaguchi Mayumi; née Tashiro (田代)); born 10 October 1944) is a Japanese actress and singer.

== Biography ==
She was born from Tokyo. After dropping out of high school, she made her debut in 1961 in the film Yūyake Ko yake no Akatonbo (directed by Koji Shima). She went sold out as Daiei Film's fresh star. Her stage name "Mayumi Nagisa" was named by composer Kosaku Yamada.

She appeared numerously in a wide variety of genres such as teen films, yakuza films, and jidaigeki. She also worked as a singer.

In 1973, after marrying to Kuranosuke Hamaguchi with an age difference 27 years, she retired effectively and gave birth to the eldest daughter the following year.

After the death of Hamaguchi in 1990, she appeared in suspense television dramas, etc.

Currently she lives her life back and forth between her married daughter and her grandchild's home in London and Roppongi.

== Filmography ==
=== Films ===
Year	Title
1961	Tokyo Onigiri Musume
1961	Ojōsan
1961	Yūyake Ko yake no Akatonbo
1962	Kiru
1963	Kōkō San Nensei
1964	Zoku Kōkō San Nensei
1964	Zatoichi
1964	Seifuku no Ōkami
1966	Fukuzatsuna Kare
1966	Zoku Teppō Inu
1967	The Hoodlum Soldier
1967	Arukoroshiya
1968	Nemuri Kyōshirō Jo Jigoku
1968	Hiroku Onna Rō
1968	Kaidan otoshi Ana
1968	Nureta Futari
1969	Tejō Muyō
1970	Kigeki Sore ga Otoko no Ikiru Michi
1970	Aru Heishi no Kake
1971	Okusama wa 18-sai
1972	Gendai Yakuza: Hitokiri Yota
1972	Outlaw Killers: Three Mad Dog Brothers
1973	Battles Without Honor and Humanity
1973	Yajūgari
1974	Battles Without Honor and Humanity: Police Tactics
1974	Yamaguchigumi Gaiden: Kyūshū Shinkō Sakusen

=== TV dramas ===
Date	Title	Role	Network	Production	Notes
11 Dec 1963	Musume no Kekkon		NTV		Episode 9 "Matteita Kōfuku Musume no Kekkon"
1965	Ma-gokoro		KTV		
1965	Nēsan	TBS		Part 1	
1965	The Guard Man	TBS		Daiei TV-Film	Episode 30 "Kinko-yaburi"
1966	Onna no Tabiji		NTV		
11 Oct 1966	Fūfuh Yakkei		NTV		Episode 377 "Tadaima Bekkyo-chū"
1967	Nēsan		TBS		Part 2
1967	The Guard Man		TBS	Daiei TV-Film	Episode 106 "Taiyō ni Mukatte Dai Tsuiseki"
1967	The Guard Man		TBS	Daiei TV-Film	Episode 126 "Onna no Sensō"
1967	The Guard Man		TBS	Daiei TV-Film	Episode 141 "Hōseki no Nigeru Michi"
1967	Yajiuma ga iku		EX		Episode 4 "Tate! Dōdō to"
1968	The Guard Man		TBS	Daiei TV-Film	Episode 175 "Akujo ga Me o samasu Tabi"
1968	The Guard Man		TBS	Daiei TV-Film	Episode 179 "Koroshi-ya no Kita Shima"
1968	The Guard Man		TBS	Daiei TV-Film	Episode 187 "Dai Kinko o buchi Yabure"
1968	The Guard Man		TBS	Daiei TV-Film	Episode 190 "Ginkō wa Mahiru ni Osoe"
1968	The Guard Man		TBS	Daiei TV-Film	Episode 194 "Shikei Shikkō Hito no Uta ga Kikoeru"
1968	Ryūhyō no Onna		TBS		
1969	The Guard Man		TBS	Daiei TV-Film	Episode 205 "Zukkoke Yarō wa Hone made shabure"
27 Feb 1969	Shiroi Yuki no Naka de		NHK		
1969	Three Outlaw Samurai	Kikuno	CX		6th Series Episode 23 "Bōsatsu"
1969	Onihei Hankachō		EX		Episode 38 "Kataki"
1969	Shin Ryūhyō no Onna		TBS		
1970	The Guard Man		TBS	Daiei TV-Film	Episode 254 "Mansion wa Onna no Senjō"
1970	The Guard Man		TBS	Daiei TV-Film	Episode 259 "Sā Onna no Fukushū ga Hajimaru wa"
1970	The Guard Man		TBS	Daiei TV-Film	Episode 266 "Danchi My Home Satsujin"
1970	The Guard Man		TBS	Daiei TV-Film	Episode 282 "Kaidan Mangetsu no Yoru wa Ōkami Onna ga Kuruu"
1970	Onihei Hankachō	Kayo	EX	Toho	Episode 39 "Mashira no Ginjirō"
1971	The Guard Man	Otohime	TBS	Daiei TV-Film	Episode 343 "O iro ke Kigeki Uwaki Kekkonshiki"
7 Feb 1971	Renai-jutsu Nyūmon		TBS		Episode 16 "Spice Dai Sakusen"
1971	Ningyō Sashichitori Monochō		EX		Yoichi Hayashi ver.; Episode 23 "Hiren Tanzaku"
1971	Shirayukihime to Nana-ri no Akutō-tachi		ABC		
12 Jul 1971	Ōoka Echizen: Part 2	Osan	TBS	C.A.L	Episode 9 "Kieta Echizen"
18 Jul 1971	Tōshiba Nichiyō Gekijō		TBS		Episode 762 "Ano Machi kono Machi"
15 Jan 1972	Key Hunter		TBS	Toei Company	Episode 198 "Ganbare! Shōbengozō Kikiippatsu"
5 May 1972	Tōshiba Nichiyō Gekijō		TBS		Episode 908 "Papa wa Kamisama janai"
1972	Jikandesuyo		TBS		2nd Series
1972	Kōya no Surōnin		EX		Episode 39 "Washi no Su-jō Gokinzō-yaburi"
16 Dec 1972	Kogarashi Monjirō		CX		2nd Series "Yonaki Ishi wa Kiri ni Nureta"
1972	Hissatsu Shikakenin	Osaya	ABC		Episode 15 "Hitogoroshi Hitodasuke"
14 Feb 1973	Shin Hasegawa Series Higedaimoku no Sei		EX		
1973	Kōya no Yōjinbō	Okei	EX		Episode 6 "Senketsu wa Ma no Tani o Somete..."
1982	Shin Hissatsu Shigoto Hito	Onaka	ABC		Episode 54 "Omomizu Nyūgaku Iwai suru"
9 Jul 1982	Okappikidobu Second Work Kyōraku Satsujin Jiken	Tayu Omuro	CX		
17 Dec 1982	Rōnin Hakkei: Yukitarō Fūryū Ken	Otsuma	CX		
19 Apr 1983	Umontori Monochō		NTV		Episode 21 "Tengu Urami-uta"

After her return

Date	Title	Role	Network	Notes
1999	Teppen		EX	
1999	Oishinbo		CX	
1999	Shōkyōto Mystery 26		NTV	
1999	Diet Sanshimai no Ryojō Jiken-bo	Birch maker's master	EX	Third work; cameo
2000	Hamidashi Keiji Jōnetsukei: Dai 4 Series		EX	Episode 17 "Otome... Kanashiki Saikai 25-nen-me no Fuyu no Jūdan!"
2001	Fighting Girl		NTV	
21 Sep 2002	Ramen Keiji "Ryū" no Satsujin Suiri 3		EX	
15 Feb 2003	Kyoto Satsujin Annai 26	Teruko Honma	EX	
27 Nov 2004	Kyoto Satsujin Annai 27	Snack Mama	EX	
2005	Yōgi-sha		NTV	
18 Nov 2006	Kyoto Satsujin Annai 29	Lady of the candle shop	EX	

== Discography ==
Singles

Year	Title	Label	Code	Notes
1968	I Love You / Hitori botchi no Onna	Daiei Record	D-47	
1968	Onna Nagare-sha / Hitori no Michi	Daiei Record	D-61	
1969	Ijimenaide / Oshiete Hoshī	Daiei Record	D-84	
1970	Onnauta / Henshin	Canyon Record	CA-4	
1971	Onna no Kagi / Onna Dake no Hanashi	Canyon Record	CA-36	
1972	Taxco Bojō / Aozora wa hitotsu	CBS Sony	SOLA 11	A side song is a city song that sang about Taxco de Alarcón of Mexico.
1973	Ubawa retai no / Onna no Kazuaki	CBS Sony	SOLB 33	
1974	Watashi Hanninmae / Mizunoue no Hanayome	CBS Sony	SOLB 109	
1974	Yoru no Mushi / Pink Moon	CBS Sony	SOLB 143	
1983	Namida to Shiawase / Sukizuki anata	Epic Sony	075H-170	As Mayumi+Kosuke Hamaguchi
1987	Roman Sapporo / Mr. Teng	Toshiba EMI	TP-17768	

Albums

Title	Label
Watashi Hanninmae	CBS Sony

== Essays ==
- National Informatics laboratory papers National Institute of Informatics (in Japanese)
