= Horror Theater Unbalance =

- Genre: Anthology; Horror; Science fiction Fantasy; Mystery; Suspense
- Created by: Tsuburaya; Fuji TV
- Written by: Yozo Tanaka, Mieko Osanai, Bunzo Wakatsuki, Ichikawa Shinichi, Tadaaki Yamazaki, Mari Takizawa, Mitsuda Kazuho, Hiroyasu Yamaura, Shozo Uehara
- Directed by: Seijun Suzuki, Toshiya Fujita, Yasuharu Hasebe, Yamagiwa Eizo, Tatsumi Kumashiro, Tokihisa Morikawa, Kazuo Kuroki, Mitsuda Kazuho, Hideo Suzuki, Ida Shin
- Country of origin: Japan
- Original language: Japanese
- No. of episodes: 13

Production
- Running time: approx. 55 minutes

Original release
- Network: Fuji TV
- Release: January 8 – April 2, 1973

Horror Theater Unbalance (恐怖劇場アンバランス, Kyōfu Gekijō Anbaransu) is a 1973 Japanese Anthology television series created by Tsuburaya and Fuji TV to air on the Fuji TV network on Monday Nights for 13 episodes.

Production originally started in 1969, but the series was 'shelved' before production was eventually completed at the end of 1972. It was then aired on Fuji TV in 1973.

== Episode list ==
1. Love affair with a mummy (木乃伊（みいら）の恋, Miira (Mī-ra) no Koi) (1/8/1973)
2. The Woman Who Warns of Death (死を予告する女, Shi o yokoku suru on'na) (1/15/1973)
3. The Killing Game (殺しのゲーム, Koroshi no gēmu) (1/22/1973)
4. Graveyard of Masks (仮面の墓場, Kamen no hakaba) (1/29/1973)
5. A woman calling out for a corpse (死骸（しかばね）を呼ぶ女, Shigai (shika bane) o yobu on'na) (2/5/1973)
6. Woman buying a local newspaper (地方紙を買う女, Chihōshi o kau on'na) (2/12/1973)
7. When the dawn breaks (夜が明けたら, Yoruga Aketara) (2/19/1973)
8. The cat knew (猫は知っていた, Neko Hashi tteita) (2/26/1973)
9. Morgue Killer (死体置場（モルグ）の殺人者, Shitai okiba (morugu) no satsujin-sha) (3/5/1973)
10. Order of the Salaryman (サラリーマンの勲章, Sararīman no Kunshō) (3/12/1973)
11. Screaming vampires (吸血鬼の絶叫, Kyūketsuki no Zekkyō) (3/19/1973)
12. Cursed hand from the grave (墓場から呪いの手, Hakaba kara noroi no te) (3/26/1973)
13. The spider woman (蜘蛛の女, Kumo no on'na) (4/2/1973)

== DVD Releases ==
In 2007, Victor Entertainment released 6 Volume DVDs of the series, and in 2010, A Boxset that contains all 6 Volumes of the DVD set was released.

== See also ==
- Ultra Q
- The Twilight Zone
- Night Gallery
