= Sex & Fury =

1973 Japanese action-thriller film directed by Norifumi Suzuki

- Film poster
- Directed by: Norifumi Suzuki
- Screenplay by: Masahiro Kakefuda; Norifumi Suzuki
- Based on: Inoshika Ochō by Tarō Bonten
- Produced by: Kanji Amao
- Starring: Reiko Ike; Christina Lindberg; Akemi Negishi
- Cinematography: Motoya Washyo
- Edited by: Isamu Ichida
- Music by: Ichirō Araki
- Distributed by: Toei Company
- Release date: February 17, 1973
- Running time: 88 minutes
- Country: Japan
- Languages: Japanese; English

Sex & Fury (不良姐御伝 猪の鹿お蝶, Furyō anego-den: Inoshika Ochō; "Legend of the Delinquent Female Boss: Ochō Inoshika") is a 1973 Japanese ero guro jidaigeki film directed by Norifumi Suzuki and starring Reiko Ike.

It was followed by Female Yakuza Tale: Inquisition and Torture in the same year where Reiko Ike reprises her role as Kyoko Kasai/Ochō Inoshika.

== Plot ==
In 1886 Japan's Meiji era, Kyoko Kasai, a young girl, and her father (a police detective), are walking along a covered pathway when she chases after a ball rolling by. While they are apart, three men kill her father. The girl runs back to him as he dies, and sees he is clutching three blood-soaked animal gaming cards in his hand. The cards feature drawings of ino (boar), sika (deer) and ocho (butterfly), respectively, potential clues regarding the killers.

Nineteen years later, in 1905, we see a young adult Kyoko (played by Reiko Ike) has changed her name to "Ochō Inoshika"—inspired by the animal cards held by her father as he died. She gets by as a petty criminal, pickpocketing and gambling. She has also learned vital skills in martial arts, swordsmanship, firearms, and other self-defense tactics.

After helping to hide a fleeing anarchist—wanted for attempted assassination of the new leader of a powerful yakuza syndicate (who are feuding for Japanese control)—Ochō becomes involved in international intrigue while searching for the sister of a man whose death she witnessed in a gambling-den, as well as finding the men responsible for killing her father. A British agent, along with his latest recruit, the sexy Christina (played by Christina Lindberg), is hoping to plunge Japan into a second opium war, further complicating Ochō's attempts at vengeance.

== Cast ==
- Reiko Ike as Ochō Inoshika/Kyoko Kasai
- Christina Lindberg as Christina
- Akemi Negishi as Shitateya Ogin
- Ryōko Ema as Omiya
- Yōko Hori as Okinu
- Naomi Oka as Okoi
- Katsumasa Uchida as Gentarô Kanô
- Rena Ichinose as Osayo Igirisu
- Tatsuo Endō
- Yōko Mihara as Yaeji

== Production ==
According to Christina Lindberg, while on a plane to Stockholm in the early 1970s, she was asked by two Japanese men if she would be interested in working in their country. Her reply was, "Why not?" Soon thereafter, she was in Japan working for Toei. She spent two and a half months there, appearing in Sex and Fury and, later, playing a more prominent role in Sadao Nakajima's 1973 film, Porno Queen: Japan Sex Tour.

== Availability ==
The Region 1 DVD cover to Sex & Fury.

The film was made available for U.S. audiences when Panic House released it on region 1 DVD on September 27, 2005.
