= Kaiketsu Zubat =

Japanese tokusatsu superhero series

- Title card
- Also known as: Swift Hero Zubat; Extraordinary Zubat; Vigilante Zubat
- Genre: Tokusatsu; Superhero; Crime
- Created by: Shotaro Ishinomori
- Written by: Shukei Nagasaka
- Directed by: Hideo Tanaka
- Starring: Hiroshi Miyauchi; Nobuko Oshiro; Nobuyuki Nakano; Shin Saito; Ryuji Hayami
- Narrated by: Shin Aomori
- Theme music composer: Kensuke Kyo
- Opening theme: "The Infernal Zubat" by Ichirou Mizuki
- Ending theme: "The Man Goes Down the Road Alone" by Ichirou Mizuki
- Composer: Kensuke Kyō
- Country of origin: Japan
- Original language: Japanese
- No. of episodes: 32

Production
- Producers: Kōjin Ono; Hakuo Kondō
- Production companies: Toei Company; Ishimori Productions

Original release
- Network: TV Tokyo
- Release: February 2 – September 28, 1977

Kaiketsu Zubat (Japanese: 快傑ズバット, Hepburn: Kaiketsu Zubatto), is a tokusatsu superhero series that aired in 1977. Created by Shotaro Ishinomori, this 32-episode series (which aired on TV Tokyo from February 2, 1977 to September 28, 1977), harkens back to tokusatsu superhero shows of the 1950s, but with a late-1970s twist. The series was first released on DVD in 2008.

== Premise and plotlines ==
"Here with a "zubat"! Solving problems with a "zubat"! I call myself the wandering hero! Kaiketsu Zubat!" (ズバッと参上、ズバッと解決、人呼んで さすらいのヒーロー！ 快傑ズバット！, Zubatto sanjō! Zubatto kaiketsu! Hito-yonde sasurai no hīrō! Kaiketsu Zubatto!)

The star of the show is a private detective named Ken Hayakawa, played by veteran Hiroshi Miyauchi. In the first episode, his best friend Goro Asuka is mysteriously killed. Ken takes over his friend's gear that Asuka had invented: a suit and a flying vehicle, which he names the Zubat Suit and the Zubat Car. He travels the land as a wandering hero, fighting evil and injustice while in the guise of Zubat, and also trying to find Asuka's killer. Zubat's name is based on the sound effect "zubatto," which is the sound of something being hit right on target.

The series is unusual in the tokusatsu genre as the title hero Zubat does not "henshin" (transform) like the other superheroes Ishinomori created. Ken Hayakawa normally dresses in black & red gringo cowboy attire, but he just puts on his red & black "Zubasuit" hidden in his guitar when deciding to face his enemies as Zubat. His outfit looks no different from that of a Sentai hero:

- A helmet with "Z"-themed features and an open/close visor and mouthpiece
- A streamlined rubber jumpsuit with a white scarf (another Ishinomori trademark).

The villains are also unusual for the genre. There are no monsters; rather, Zubat fights against a large criminal organization named Dakker and its mysterious leader, as well as other outlandishly-dressed criminals. Many episodes of this series have a bizarre Japanese "wild west" style setting, perhaps to explain why justice is meted out by a traveling superhero rather than lawful authorities expected in a more populated and dense setting like Japanese big cities.

An episode would generally have a single head criminal, and a yojimbo ("bodyguard"), somehow terrorizing a group of people. Ken Hayakawa would happen upon this and meet the yojimbo, which would lead to a demonstration of the latter's quirky skill they've used to threaten people. Ken Hayakawa would then defeat the villain and their gimmick.

== Episode list ==
1. Right After the Wandering Blast (さすらいは爆破のあとで, Sasurai wa Bakuha no Ato de)
2. Migratory Birds Right in the Flames (炎の中の渡り鳥, Honō no Naka no Wataridori)
3. The Sorrow Solid-Golden Angel (悲しき純金の天使, Kanashiki Junkin no Tenshi)
4. The Tearful Enemy Breaks Right Through (涙の敵中突破, Namida no Teki Chū Toppa)
5. The Flower Vendor Girl and the White Flour (花売り少女と白い粉, Hanauri Shōjo to Shiroi Kona)
6. The Machine Gun Howls in the Sea (海にほえるマシンガン, Umi ni Hoeru Mashingan)
7. The Nefarious Wind Blows Through the Seaport (悪い風だぜ港町, Warui Kaze daze Minatochō)
8. The Sorrowful Propane Blast (哀しみのプロパン爆破, Kanashimi no Puropan Bakuha)
9. Looking Back at the Tearful River (涙の河を振り返れ, Namida no Kawa o Furikaere)
10. The Baseball Opponent Flies to the Curb (野球の敵を場外へ飛ばせ, Yakyū no Teki o Jōgai e Tobase)
11. Don't Die, my Friends! Crisis One Second Back (死ぬな友よ! 危機一秒前, Shinu na Tomo yo! Kiki Ichi-Byō Mae)
12. An Executioner 10 Seconds Ago (死刑執行10秒前, Shikeishikkō Jū-Byō Mae)
13. The Boy Killer's Ballade (少年殺し屋のバラード, Shōnen Koroshi-Ya no Barādo)
14. The White-Feathered Arrow's Farewell Tears (白羽の矢 涙の別れ, Shiroha no Ya Namida no Wakare)
15. The Sorrowful Mother's Lullaby (哀しき母の子守唄, Kanashiki Haha no Komoriuta)
16. The Sorrowful Ken's Accused of Murder (殺しのぬれぎぬ 哀しみの健, Koroshi no Nureginu Kanashimi no Ken)
17. The Little Wailing Sister: Two Kens (嘆きの妹 ふたりの健, Nageki no Imōto Futari no Ken)
18. Look Out! The Soap Bubble's Love (危うし! シャボン玉の恋, Ayaushi! Shanbontama no Koi)
19. The Tragic Love Breaks the Love Letter (悲恋 破られたラブレター, Hiren Yaburareta Raburetā)
20. The Female Dragon Vowed to Shed Tears (女ドラゴン 涙の誓い, Onna Doragon Namida no Chikai)
21. Farewell, Eyelidded Mother (さらば瞼の母, Saraba Mabuta no Haha)
22. The Young Boxer: Tearful Father (少年ボクサー 涙の父, Shōnen Bokusā Namida no Chichi)
23. The Okami Family Home: The Three Sisters and Ten'ichibo (大神家一族の三姉妹と天一坊, Ōkami Ichizoku no Sanshimai to Ten'ichibō)
24. The Tearful Ken: The Unknown Town's Lover (涙の健 見知らぬ街の恋人, Namida no Ken Mishiranumachi no Koibito)
25. Kojin'yama's Tearful Farewell (荒神山 涙の別れ, Kojin'yama Namida no Wakare)
26. Forgive Me, My Child! (許せ我が子よ!, Yuruse Waga Ko yo!)
27. Surprise! Is that the Perpetrator who killed Asuka?! (意外! 飛鳥殺しの犯人?!, Igai! Asuka Koroshi no Hannin?!)
28. And then, He Becomes Nobody (そして、誰も居なくなる, Soshite, Dare mo Inaku Naru)
29. Orphaned Children: Tearful Revenge (父母なき子 涙の復讐, Fubonaki Ko Namida no Fukushū)
30. Between the Sorrowful Life and Death (悲しき生と死の間に, Kanashiki Seitoshi no Ma ni)
31. Showdown! Leader L's the Real Culprit? (対決! 真犯人首領L?, Taiketsu! Shinhan'nin Shuryō Eru?)
32. The Day-to-Day Battle Bids Farewell, And then (さらば斗いの日々、そして, Saraba Tatakai no Hibi, Soshite)

== Cast ==
- Ken Hayakawa (早川 健, Hayakawa Ken): Hiroshi Miyauchi (宮内 洋, Miyauchi Hiroshi)
- Midori Asuka (飛鳥 みどり, Asuka Midori): Nobuko Ōshiro (大城 信子, Ōshiro Nobuko)
- Osamu Terada (寺田 オサム, Terada Osamu): Nobuyuki Nakano (中野 宣之, Nakano Nobuyuki)
- Shingo Tōjō (東条 進吾, Tōjō Shingo): Shin Saitō (斉藤 真, Saitō Shin)
- Leader L (首領L, Shuryō Eru): Ryūji Hayami (はやみ 竜次, Hayami Ryūji)
- Narrator (ナレーター, Narētā): Shin Aomori (青森 伸, Aomori Shin)

== Songs ==
Opening theme

- Jigoku no Zubat (地獄のズバット, Jigoku no Zubatto; The Infernal Zubat)
  - Lyrics: Shōtarō Ishinomori
  - Composition & Arrangement: Kensuke Kyō
  - Artist: Ichirou Mizuki

Ending theme

- Otoko wa Hitori Michi o Yuku (男はひとり道をゆく; The Man Goes Down the Road Alone)
  - Lyrics: Saburo Yatsude
  - Composition & Arrangement: Kensuke Kyō
  - Artist: Ichirou Mizuki

== Kamen Rider 40th Anniversary ==
Zubat, along with Kikaider, Kikaider 01, and Inazuman made an appearance in the film OOO, Den-O, All Riders: Let's Go Kamen Riders (オーズ・電王・オールライダー レッツゴー仮面ライダー, Ōzu Den'ō Ōru Raidā: Rettsu Gō Kamen Raidā) in commemoration of the Kamen Rider's 40th anniversary and Toei Company's 60th anniversary in 2011. This brief appearance saw the four heroes destroy the Kamen Rider Stronger villain, General Shadow.

== Legacy ==
This series would also be parodied by Daicon Films (now Gainax) in 1982, in a series of short films starring the superhero Kaiketsu Noutenki (who also has the same alter-ego, Ken Hayakawa). Zubat's costume was also a basis for the video game superhero parody Viewtiful Joe.
