= Yagi Masao =

Japanese pianist

Yagi Masao (八木正生, Yagi Masao, November 14, 1932 – March 4, 1991) was a Japanese pianist who became devoted to American jazz very early in the wave of Japanese jazz enthusiasm. He became a member of the Cozy Quartet in 1956 after Toshiko Akiyoshi's departure, playing alongside Sadao Watanabe. Robin Kelley, in his biography of Thelonious Monk, says that before his inaugural 1963 tour, "Monk's greatest champion in Japan was not a critic but a pianist named Yagi Masao. In 1959, the twenty-six-year-old pianist formed his own group featuring several Monk tunes in their repertoire, culminating in his debut LP, Masao Yagi Plays Thelonious Monk, recorded in the summer of 1960." Later in the 1960s he played with Charlie Mariano, Hidehiko Matsumoto, and Helen Merrill, and in the 1970s led his own ensembles. He was well-known as a composer and arranger, and wrote copiously for film soundtracks.
