= René Viénet =

French sinologist (born 1944)

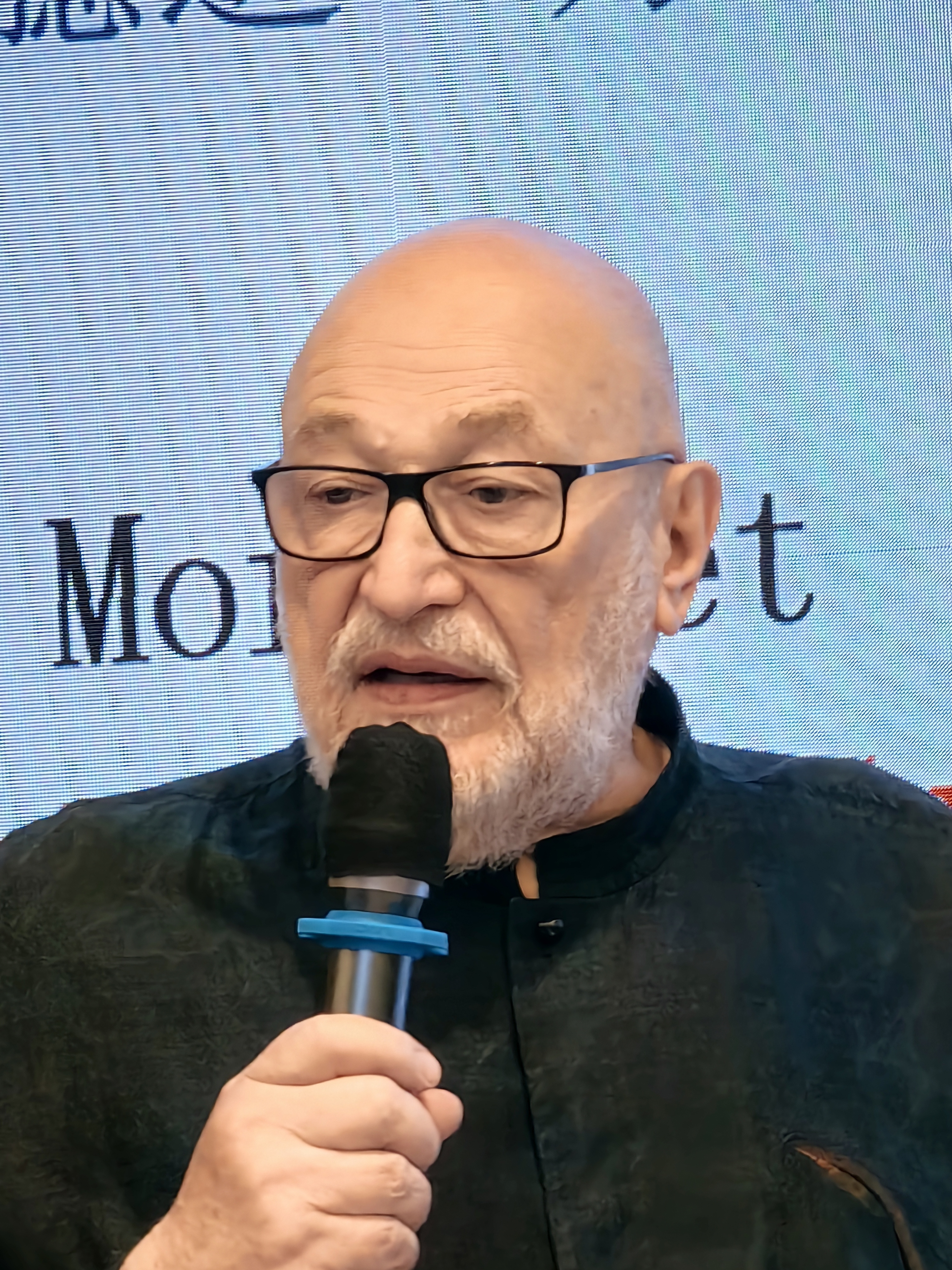
René Viénet at 2024 Shanghai Book Fair

René Viénet (Chinese: 魏延年; pinyin: ‌Wèi Yán'nián‌) (born 6 February 1944, in Le Havre) is a French sinologist who is famous as a situationist writer and filmmaker. Viénet used the situationist technique of détournement — the diversion of already existing cultural elements to new subversive purposes.

== Career ==
René Viénet was a member of the Situationist International (SI) from 1963 to 1971. He was one of the SI's two filmmakers, though his films were made and released after he had left the group. But his footprint goes much beyond the few youthful years he spent in this organization, as he explained in a 2015 interview with Daoud Boughezala for Causeur and in an earlier two-hour-long radio conversation on France-Culture with Hélène Hazera. These two interviews are his only public discussions of his life and work to date.

Viénet has supplied most of the details, and approved the present premature epitaph, assuming it remains unaltered.

René Viénet was born on 6 February 1944 to a family that had been dockworkers for several generations in Le Havre, France. He lived in Le Havre until he moved to Paris to study Chinese with Jacques Pimpaneau, an extraordinarily productive scholar, with whom he has remained close friends ever since. Viénet's film Mao by Mao (1977) is dedicated to Jacques Pimpaneau.

From October to March 1965, Viénet briefly taught French at NanJing University in China. Upon his return to France, he translated Harold Isaacs's Tragedy of the Chinese Revolution into French for Éditions Gallimard. This book had a lasting influence on him; In 1974, in Hong Kong, using lead type, he reprinted an early and forgotten Chinese translation of it.

From 1967 to 1978, Viénet was employed by the CNRS (Centre National de la Recherche Scientifique). Based at Paris University 7 (Jussieu), he established a library devoted to modern Chinese history and literature and set up the only archive of Chinese films outside China. All of these films, which he collected in Hong Kong with Chan Hing Ho and Françoise Zylberberg, were later transferred to the Taipei Film Library.

Viénet was also the series editor of more than fifty works published by a variety of houses but collectively known as the Bibliothèque Asiatique. These included: La Vie et l'œuvre de Su Renshan, rebelle, peintre, et fou, 1814–1849? / Su RenShan: Painter, Rebel, and Madman, 1814–1849?, by Pierre Ryckmans (aka Simon Leys); various bilingual books; and catalogues for the Bibliothèque Nationale de France. Many were produced by a kind of non-profit coop. Floriana and Gérard Lebovici's Champ Libre put out Simon Leys's Les habits neufs du Président Mao / The Chairman's New Clothes. Viénet published three more books under the Champ Libre imprint in Hong Kong: Chinese translations of Mustapha Khayati's Situationist classic De la misère en milieu étudiant / On the Poverty of Student Life and of Harold Isaacs's Tragedy, as well as Luo Mengce, Le paradoxal destin politique de Confucius.

The relationship with Champ Libre ended when Guy Debord convinced Lebovici not to publish any more books by Leys (including Ombres Chinoises / Chinese Shadows, then at the page-proof stage). Leys's books of the period ended up at the UGE/Plon paperback imprint 10/18 and were later reprinted at Viénet's initiative by Jean-François Revel at Robert Laffont.

Also published by 10/18 under the imprint of Christian Bourgois were several Bibliothèque Asiatique titles, among them book-length editions of famous samizdats by Wei JingSheng and the Li YiZhe group, in both cases for the first time outside China; they were published first in French and separately in Chinese.

Viénet has the distinction of being fired twice by his colleagues at the CNRS (the second time for good). His transgression was publishing Leys's work and also Révo. cul dans la Chine pop (again with 10/18). The latter was a notorious collection of first-hand documents written by the Red Guards, edited by Chan HingHo, who supervised the translation into French by a team of young students; the book had an introduction by Viénet, who coined the slang title Révo. cul. (approximately "asshole revolution"), which became a widely used nickname in France for Mao's Cultural Revolution.

Viénet's enemies the Catholic-Maoists—then in control of Asian Studies in France—also took offense at the anti-Mme Mao-ist thrust of his film Chinois, encore un effort pour être révolutionnaires / Peking Duck Soup, an experiment in documentary film-making, which remains Viénet's major film to date.

Taken together, Viénet's publishing and cinematic activities in the late 1970s constitute a lonely but devastating campaign against the quasi-general and aggressive consensus of a French intelligentsia befuddled by Maoist pipedreams. An extension of the Situationist project.

Confronted by the financial failure of Chinois in spite of its success at the 1977 Cannes Festival, and by the relentless hostility of French academics—the same ones who made sure that Leys/Ryckmans would never teach in France—Viénet elected in 1979 to move to Asia, where, over the next thirty years, he was involved in various business ventures In 1982, he brokered a twenty-year enriched-uranium contract for the Taiwan Power Company, meeting one-third of the need of its six reactors' fuel-rods. This is discussed in an article in the February 2020 issue of the Question Chine newsletter, including picturesque details of dogfights with some French officials.^{^{[1]}} Since his youth—and in a way that certainly makes him the odd one out among fellow Situationists — Viénet has championed peaceful nuclear energy and disparaged the illusion of subsidized wind-power, which he believes is the best ally of polluting fossil-fuel-generated electricity.

Among his other business achievements is his work in the medical field, where he initiated and launched emergency contraception products in Taiwan and Hong Kong. Clinical trials conducted at his initiative in Taiwan led to the official licensing on the island of RU486 (mifepristone). This medication allows the interruption of early pregnancy (IoEP) and is the medicinal alternative to surgical abortion.

He was the co-founder and manager of a company undertaking the low-cost production in Taiwan of a generic misoprostol, (trademarked by Viénet as GyMiso), which is the necessary complement to mifepristone for medicinal IoEP. It was approved for use in France, then in the rest of Europe, where it created substantial cost savings for various public health systems because doctors in private practice could use it, not just hospitals, where the Cytotec brand had previously been used off-label. In France today, the RU486 + GyMiso IoEP regimen + two doctor visits is practically free of charge for all women, the actual cost of over two hundred euros including doctor's visits being reimbursable under the national health system.

More recently, Viénet has been looking for partners to launch no-cost emergency contraception, based on a 10-mg micro-dose of mifepristone, which is patent-free, side-effect-free, well known, proven to be the best alternative, and in fact very cheap to produce. In Vietnam, for example, the public retail price of Mf10mg in pharmacies is under 50 U.S. cents per dose. It remains to be seen whether Viénet can succeed against the fat cats of contraception, who sell a cheaply produced ersatz version of Mifepristone (ulipristal acetate, branded as EllaOne) at a hundred times the price in Vietnam.

In 2003, Viénet founded Éditions René Viénet, which has published several books unwelcome at regular publishing houses, among them Olivier Blanc's biography of Marie-Olympe de Gouges (eventually a successful title) and (less successful) French translations of George H. Kerr's Formosa Betrayed and Peng MingMin's Taste of Freedom, etc.

Viénet has also made numerous contributions to the preservation of the early photographic history of China. In the 1980s, he came across the diaries of Prosper Giquel and got interested in the history of Foochow Arsenal. He contributed a huge trove of historical documents, including many rare photographs, to the ChuanZheng XueTang Museum at MaWei in the Min River estuary, downstream from FuZhou, concerning Prosper Giquel (1835–1886). Giquel was a French naval officer who played a key role in the early modernization of China, establishing a French and English language technical university in 1866, and an elaborate associated shipyard at Pagoda Anchorage, all paid for by Imperial China. The university and shipyard were destroyed in August 1884 by Admiral Courbet, acting upon orders from Jules Ferry.

In 1980, Viénet brought back to Taiwan the full set of John Thomson's photographs of Southern Formosa taken in April 1871. He identified these in the Société de Géographie collections at France's Bibliothèque nationale, and supplemented them, with the help of Michael Gray, by means of the John Thomson glass negatives of China preserved at the Wellcome Library in London. To support many related exhibitions, Viénet commissioned Chinese translations of John Thomson's books, ultimately published in Taiwan, Macau and China.

In 2007, Viénet assumed the editorship of the French journal Monde chinois. He successfully brought out four issues (numbers 11, 12-13 and 14), changing a lightweight publication into one of serious interest. In 2008, the fourth number edited by Vienet was pulped immediately after printing by the journal's owner (a Mr. Lorot), who sought to obliterate all trace of an article by Francis Deron about the slaughters committed during the (anti)-Cultural (counter)-Revolution in China, and later by the Khmers Rouge in Cambodia.

Deron and Viénet sued Lorot, who had published a new #14 without Deron's article, and they won: a few issues later, Lorot was obliged to print the article he had suppressed and pulped. By that time, however, Viénet was no longer in charge of the journal.

In 2015, Nicole Brenez gave Viénet carte blanche at the Cinémathèque Française. As a result, Viénet's four films have been screened at several film festivals almost fifty years after they were made. This in turn has afforded him access to the original negatives and let him create fresh digital files (in several languages) to replace the versions found on the internet, which are abundant but very poor technically and often badly translated.

In addition to bringing his own films back into public view, his carte blanche allowed Viénet to showcase films he had much admired by including them in his screening series: Les Chinois à Paris by Jean Yanne; Do not Let the Dead Bury their Dead (The 81st Blow) by Miriam Novich; and three documentaries by Hu Jie.

René Viénet is currently researching a film on the French Revolution intended to destroy many of the myths and lies of Stalinist historians.

== Accusation of Sexual Harassment ==
In 2024, Viénet was accused of by the Taiwanese Cartoonist Adoor Yeh for verbal sexual harassment. Adoor Yeh posted on Facebook on December 22, 2024, stating that Wei raised many private questions about sexuality to Adoor Yeh during the meeting in a snack bar. Later she reported the case to the police for sexual harassment. After that, more women stood up and accused Viénet. On January 6, 2025, the Locus Publishing in Taiwan announced that Viénet had resigned from his position as a director.

== A note on the films ==
Between 1969 and 1972, Viénet discovered and fell in love with the contemporary cinema of Hong Kong and older Chinese classics. In the period 1972–1974 he distributed more than one hundred films to markets in Europe, the French West Indies and French-speaking Africa.

His first two releases in Paris, offered with his own straightforward translations, were Du sang chez les taoïstes / 殺戒 /ShaJie and Les félons d'AnTchai 路客與刀客 LuKe Yu DaoKe. He then created the following films détournés:

1972: La Dialectique peut-elle casser des briques? / Can Dialectics Break Bricks? A first version with subtitles that repurposed or hijacked the meaning of the original film 唐手跆拳道; then, in 1973, a dubbed version supervised by Gérard Cohen extrapolating from Viénet's titles.

1974: Une petite culotte pour l'été (aka Les Filles de Kamaré), making use of a Japanese soft-porn film by Suzuki Noribumi, which Viénet hijacked via subtitles and to which he added a few hard-core inserts for a more pointed détournement.

Viénet subsequently authored and directed two more complex and personal films:

1976: Mao par lui-même / Mao by Mao / 毛澤東獨白. This biographical TV-length film was based on extensive archival research and had a voice-over composed entirely of Mao's own words. Fortuitously, the film was completed just as Mao died, on 9 September 1976, and it was immediately picked up by French TV. It was later the French entry in the short film competition at the 1977 Cannes Film Festival.

1977: Chinois, encore un effort pour être révolutionnaires / Peking Duck Soup / 他們辦事, 老百姓不放心). Again based on archival research and composed largely of found footage, this feature-length film competed in the Cannes Directors Fortnight in 1977.

The films were produced simultaneously in French and English versions.

The English voice-over of Mao by Mao was by Jack Belden, the noted journalist and writer on China. The Yiddish version had the voice of Moishe Zylberberg. And the Cantonese version had that of Li KamFung. Viénet himself provided the voice-over for the French version. All were recorded in the same year, 1976.

The French voice-over for Chinois encore un effort was by Jacques Pimpaneau, with Thierry Lévy providing the voice for the Li YiZhe sequence. Donald Nicholson-Smith was responsible for the English-language version, entitled Peking Duck Soup, and the voice-over was that of John Galbraith Simmons.

Both these films were produced by Hélène Vager, EdwinAline and Charles-Henri Favrod. Viénet worked with the same assistants on the two: Francis Deron (under a pseudonym since he had just been recruited by the AFP as a correspondent in Beijing), and Wu XingMing or Ji QingMing (both pseudonyms for a citizen of the PRC living in France, who almost immediately distanced himself from Viénet and Deron). The editing team was Noun Serra, Monique Clementi, Bertrand Renaudineau, and Franck Vager. The sound engineer was Dominique Hennequin. The late Pierre Rissient was instrumental in the selection of these two films for Cannes.

In 2019, Keith Sanborn was invited by Viénet to refresh his earlier American subtitling of Can Dialectics Break Bricks? Ever since, Sanborn's American version has been the basis for other subtitled versions, notably, the Spanish version by Carlos Prieto, screened at Ficunam in Mexico, Madrid, and elsewhere.

== Publication ==
- La Tragédie de la révolution chinoise: 1925–1927 by Harold R. Isaacs, Paris, Gallimar, La Suite des Temps, 1967 (translator).
- Enragés et situationnistes dans le mouvement des occupations, Paris, Gallimard, Témoins, 1968.
- Enragés and Situationists in the Occupations Movement, 1968.
- Preface to Simon Leys, Les Habits neufs du président Mao. Chronique de la Révolution culturelle, Paris, Éditions Champ libre, Bibliothèque asiatique, 1971.
- Grestitions and Ensituats in the Abrem Movement, 1972.
- with Bernard Marbot, Notes sur quelques photographies de la Chine au XIXe siècle, à l'occasion de l'exposition "La Chine entre le collodion humide et le gélatinobromure" (Exposition, Bibliothèque nationale, Département des estampes et de la photographie, 1978), Paris, Centre de publication Asie orientale, 1978.

== Films ==
- Between 1969 and 1972, Viénet discovered and fell in love with the contemporary cinema of Hong Kong and older Chinese classics. In the period 1972–1974 he distributed more than one hundred films to markets in Europe, the French West Indies and French-speaking Africa. His first two releases in Paris, offered with his own straightforward translations, were Du sang chez les taoïstes / 殺戒 /ShaJie and Les félons d'AnTchai 路客與刀客 LuKe Yu DaoKe.
- La Dialectique peut-elle casser des briques? / Can Dialectics Break Bricks? A first version with subtitles that repurposed or hijacked the meaning of the original film 唐手跆拳道; then, in 1973, a dubbed version supervised by Gérard Cohen extrapolating from Viénet's titles. In 2019, Keith Sanborn was invited by Viénet to refresh his earlier American subtitling of Can Dialectics Break Bricks? Ever since, Sanborn's American version has been the basis for other subtitled versions, notably, the Spanish version by Carlos Prieto, screened at Ficunam in Mexico, Madrid, and elsewhere.
- 1974: Une petite culotte pour l'été (aka Les Filles de Kamaré), making use of a Japanese soft-porn film by Suzuki Noribumi, which Viénet hijacked via subtitles and to which he added a few hard-core inserts for a more pointed détournement.
- 1976: Mao par lui-même / Mao by Mao / 毛澤東獨白. This biographical TV-length film was based on extensive archival research and had a voice-over composed entirely of Mao's own words. Fortuitously, the film was completed just as Mao died, on 9 September 1976, and it was immediately picked up by French TV. It was later the French entry in the short film competition at the 1977 Cannes Film Festival. The English voice-over of Mao by Mao was by Jack Belden, the noted journalist and writer on China. The Yiddish version had the voice of Moishe Zylberberg. And the Cantonese version had that of Li KamFung. Viénet himself provided the voice-over for the French version. All were recorded in the same year, 1976.
- 1977: Chinois, encore un effort pour être révolutionnaires / Peking Duck Soup /他們辦事, 老百姓不放心). Again based on archival research and composed largely of found footage, this feature-length film competed in the Cannes Directors Fortnight in 1977. The French voice-over for Chinois encore un effort was by Jacques Pimpaneau, with Thierry Lévy providing the voice for the Li YiZhe sequence. Donald Nicholson-Smith was responsible for the English-language version, entitled Peking Duck Soup, and the voice-over was that of John Galbraith Simmons.
- Both Mao by Mao and Chinois encore un effort were produced by Hélène Vager, EdwinAline and Charles-Henri Favrod. Viénet worked with the same assistants on the two: Francis Deron (under a pseudonym since he had just been recruited by the AFP as a correspondent in Beijing), and Wu XingMing or Ji QingMing (both pseudonyms for a citizen of the PRC living in France, who almost immediately distanced himself from Viénet and Deron). The editing team was Noun Serra, Monique Clementi, Bertrand Renaudineau, and Franck Vager. The sound engineer was Dominique Hennequin. The late Pierre Rissient was instrumental in the selection of these two films for Cannes.

== Articles ==
- Blender magazine
