= Reiko Ike =

Japanese actress, singer, and entertainer

- Born: Ikeda Reiko (池田玲子); May 25, 1953 (age 73); Tokyo, Japan

Reiko Ike (池 玲子, Ike Reiko; born May 25, 1953, in Tokyo, Japan) is a Japanese actress, singer, and entertainer. She is best known for her roles in the genre of action/erotic movies known as pink films. Ike also released an album of songs in 1971, Kōkotsu No Sekai. After a drug-related arrest, and another arrest for illegal gambling in the 1970s, Ike dropped out of the entertainment business.

== Life and career ==
Ike's career was launched with the fourth entry in Toei's Hot Springs Geisha series, Hot Springs Mimizu Geisha (1971). A media frenzy erupted following the release of this film when Ike claimed to have lied about her age to gain a part in the movie. Claiming to have in fact been sixteen years of age when she starred in this softcore sex film, Ike caused a scandal. The publicity only served to make the film one of Toei's most profitable films of the 1970s.

In her third film, director Norifumi Suzuki's Modern Porno Tale: Inherited Sex Mania (1971), Ike co-starred with French erotic actress, Sandra Julien. Eirin, the Japanese film-rating board, objected to the graphic lesbian scenes between the two actresses, and this film had to be severely cut before it could be released theatrically. Ike starred in five of Toei's seven Sukeban (delinquent schoolgirl) films made between 1971 and 1974. Patrick Macias describes this series as, "bare-chested, shotgun-packing chicks Miki Sugimoto and Ike Reiko getting into one catfight after another." She also starred in all four of Toei's Terror Female High School films made in 1972 and 1973. Ike's later films would include appearances in Kinji Fukasaku's Battles Without Honor and Humanity series and Graveyard of Honor (1975), and the second sequel to Sonny Chiba's The Street Fighter.

Yuko Mihara Weisser calls Ike one of the "icons of Pinky Violence," and in a review of Sex and Fury (1973), DVDManiacs.net called Ike, "the very epitome [of] the cinematic bad girl, playing her role with a sense of collected cool and tough attitude that can rival that of even better known North American tough gals such as Tura Satana from Faster Pussycat… Kill! Kill! or Pam Grier in Foxy Brown."

== Selected filmography ==
- Hot Springs Mimizu Geisha (温泉みみず芸者 - Onsen mimizu geisha) (7/3/1971)
- Girl Boss Blues – Queen Bee’s Counterattack (女番長ブルース 牝蜂の逆襲 - Sukeban Buruusu – Mesubachi No Gyakushu) (10/27/1971)
- Modern Porno Tale: Inherited Sex Mania (現代ポルノ伝 先天性淫婦 - Gendai Porno-den: Senten-sei Inpu) (12/17/1971)
- Girl Boss Blues – Queen Bee’s Challenge (女番長ブルース 牝蜂の挑戦 - Sukeban Buruusu Mesubachi No Chosen) (2/3/1972)
- Girl Boss Guerilla (女番長ゲリラ - Sukeban Guerilla) (8/12/1972)
- Terrifying Girls High School: Women’s Violent Classroom (恐怖女子高校 女暴力教室 - Kyofu Joshi Koko – Boryoku Kyoshitsu) (9/29/1972)
- Lustful shogun and his twentyone mistresses (エロ将軍と二十一人の愛妾 - Ero shogun to nijyuichi nin no aisho) (12/2/1972)
- Girl Boss Revenge (女番長 - Sukeban) (1/13/1973)
- Sex and Fury (不良姐御伝 猪の鹿お蝶 - Furyō anego den: Inoshika Ochō) (2/17/1973)
- Terrifying Girls' High School: Lynch Law Classroom (恐怖女子高校 暴行リンチ教室 - Kyōfu joshikōkō: bōkō rinchi kyōshitsu) (3/31/1973)
- Female Yakuza Tale: Inquisition and Torture (やさぐれ姐御伝 総括リンチ - Yasagure anego den: sōkatsu rinchi) (6/7/1973)
- Terrifying Girls High School: Delinquent Convulsion Group (恐怖女子高校 不良悶絶グループ - Kyofu Joshi Koko – Furyo Monzetsu Guruupu) (9/1/1973)
- Battles Without Honor and Humanity: Proxy War (仁義なき戦い 代理戦争 - Jingi naki tatakai: Dairi senso) (9/25/1973)
- Criminal Woman: Killing Melody (前科おんな 殺し節 - Zenka onna: koroshi-bushi) (10/27/1973)
- Terrifying Girls High School: Animal Courage (恐怖女子高校 アニマル同級生 - Kyofu Joshi Koko – Animaru Dokyosei) (12/1/1973)
- Girl Boss: Diamond Showdown (女番長 タイマン勝負 - Sukeban – Taiman Shobu) (1/15/1974)
- Bohachi Bushido Saburai (忘八武士道 さ無頼) (2/2/1974)
- The Street Fighter's Last Revenge (逆襲！殺人拳 - Gyakushû! Satsujin ken) (11/22/1974)
- New Battles Without Honor and Humanity (新仁義なき戦い - Shin Jingi Naki Tatakai) (12/28/1974)
- The Bedevilled (心魔 - Xin mo) (1/1/1975, Golden Harvest, as Chi4 Ling4 Ji2 (Cantonese Yale))
- Graveyard of Honor (仁義の墓場 - Jingi no hakaba) (2/15/1975)
- Cops vs. Thugs (県警対組織暴力 - Kenkeitai Soshiki Boryoku) (4/26/1975)
- The Golden Dog (黄金の犬 - Ōgon no inu) (6/2/1979)
