= Sukeban =

Japanese term meaning "girl boss" or "delinquent girl"

- Years active: 1960s–1970s
- Country: Japan
- Influenced: Seinen manga, Pinky Violence films, all-girl Bōsōzoku gangs

Sukeban (スケバン/助番) is a Japanese term meaning 'delinquent girl', and the female equivalent to the male banchō in Japanese culture. The usage of the word sukeban refers to either the leader of a girl gang or the entire gang itself, and is not used to refer to any one member of a girl gang.

The word sukeban was originally used by delinquents, but has been used by the general population to describe the subculture since 1972. Sukeban were formed as a direct result of male gangs' refusal to accept female members, consequently the term has come to refer to the massive movement that brought feminism to public attention at a time when men of the yakuza were thriving.

Sukeban reportedly first appeared in Japan during the 1960s, presenting themselves as the female equivalent to the banchō gangs, which were composed mostly of men. During the 1970s, as banchō gangs began to die out, sukeban girl gangs began to rise in number. Gangs were initially small groups of girls sneaking cigarettes in school bathrooms, but eventually grew in numbers, as did their level of criminality. These gangs were commonly associated by violence and shop-lifting. Gangs ranged in size from Tokyo's United Shoplifters group, comprising roughly 80 members, to the Kanto Women Delinquent Alliance, rumored to have had around 20,000 members. Criminal activities and violence of the girl gangs in Japan reached such a high that sketches used to identify them in Japanese police pamphlets in the 1980s described aspects of their fashion as "omens of downfall".

== Characteristics ==
=== Appearance and other signifiers ===
The common signifiers of sukeban include brightly-dyed or permed hair, in colours of either blonde or light brown. Members of sukeban also modified their school uniform by wearing coloured socks, rolling up their sleeves and lengthening their skirt, which were sometimes decorated with gang-affiliated symbols, kanji and/or slogans. The long skirts were a rejection of the popularity of the miniskirt, which had become popular in the 1960s during the sexual revolution. Though their skirts were long, sukeban often cut their shirts to expose their midriffs. Converse sneakers were also another addition, and their clothes often had handmade modifications, including badges and buttons. They wore very little make-up and sported thin eyebrows. Adding to these features, sukeban usually wore surgical masks, and often carried with them razor blades, bamboo swords and chains, which could be concealed under their skirts.

The style of the sukeban have been interpreted as a rebellion against traditional gender norms, sexism, and the objectification of women, while, more specifically, the length of their skirts has been read as a reaction to the sexual revolution.

=== Codes of Conduct and similar attitudes ===
Sukeban girls followed strict rules and codes of conduct within their gangs. Each gang possessed a hierarchy as well as their own means of punishment; cigarette burns were considered a minor punishment for stealing a boyfriend or disrespecting a senior member. Sukeban were reported to engage in activities such as stimulant use, shoplifting, theft, and violence, but if arrested, could be charged with the lesser offence of "pre-delinquency". Stimulants used often included sniffing paint thinner or glue.

== Media and cultural influence ==
In the 1970s and 1980s, sukeban became popular characters in seinen manga. Sukeban characters could also be seen in shōjō manga publications. Sukeban Deka, Tales of Yajikita College and Hana no Asuka-gumi! were three popular shōjo series that had a mostly sukeban cast.

Pink film director Norifumi Suzuki made the first films in the seven-film Girl Boss (Sukeban) series. He also started the four-film Terrifying Girls' High School series (1971–1972) featuring sukeban characters. Both series featured prominent Pinky violent actresses Reiko Ike and Miki Sugimoto, as well as former beauty queen Reiko Oshida. On December 6, 2005, Panik House company released a four-disc region-1 DVD collection surveying Sukeban films entitled The Pinky Violence Collection. These films challenged traditional constructions of gender and female sexuality in postwar Japan.

Crime writer Jake Adelstein said with regards to sukeban:

What is unusual is that in the yakuza, women have no authority and there are almost no female members. That the female gangs even existed is an oddity in Japan's generally sexist male-dominated deviant culture... the world was about feminism and liberation, and perhaps they felt like women have the right to be just as stupid, promiscuous, risk-seeking, adrenaline junkies and violent as their male counterparts.

== See also ==
- Oira Sukeban
- Bōsōzoku
- Yankī
- Teamer (Chīmā)
- Color Gang

== Sources ==
- Ashcraft, Brian with Ueda Shoko (2010). Japanese Schoolgirl Confidential: How Teenage Girls Made a Nation Cool. Kodansha. ISBN 978-4-7700-3115-0.
- Weisser, Yuko Mihara (2nd Quarter 2001). "Japanese Fighting Divas 101". Asian Cult Cinema #31.
