= Miki Sugimoto =

Japanese actress (born 1953)

- Born: January 28, 1953 (age 73); Kanagawa, Japan

Miki Sugimoto (杉本 美樹, Sugimoto Miki; January 28, 1953 –) is a Japanese actress best known for her roles in the sukeban (delinquent girl) subgenre of Toei's action/erotic form of "pink film" known as Pinky Violence.

== Life and career ==
Sugimoto began her career as a model and television personality. She made her film debut in Hot Springs Mimizu Geisha (1971), which starred Reiko Ike. Sugimoto's and Ike's careers would become closely linked in several of Toei's Pinky Violent films, in which they were usually cast as rivals. In 1973, Sugimoto won one of the Newcomer of the Year Awards at the Élan d'or Awards given by the All Nippon Producers Association (ANPA).

Sugimoto's best-known solo role was in Zero Woman: Red Handcuffs, the "over-the-top" crime film from (1974). When Toei expanded into the European market in the 1970s, Sugimoto's 1973 film Girl Boss: Escape From Reform School was released by Telemondial in France as Girl Boss – Les etudiantes en caval.

In 1978 she abandoned her film career for marriage, and later became a nursery school teacher.

== Selected filmography ==
- Hot Springs Earthworm Geisha (温泉みみず芸者, Onsen mimizu geisha) (3 July 1971)
- Girl Boss Blues: Queen Bee's Counterattack (女番長ブルース 牝蜂の逆襲, Mesubachi no gyakushu) (27 October 1971)
- Today's Yakuza: Three Decoy Blood Brothers (現代やくざ 血桜三兄弟, Gendai yakuza: chizakura san kyodai) (19 November 1971)
- Girl Boss Blues: Queen Bee's Challenge (女番長ブルース 牝蜂の挑戦, Mesubachi no chosen) (3 February 1972)
- Tokugawa Sex Ban: Lustful Lord (徳川セックス禁止令 色情大名, Tokugawa sekkusu kinshi-rei: shikijō daimyō) (26 April 1972)
- Hot Springs Snapping Turtle Geisha (温泉スッポン芸者, Onsen suppon geisha) (3 July 1972)
- Girl Boss Guerilla (女番長ゲリラ, Sukeban gerira) (12 August 1972)
- Terrifying Girls' High School: Women's Violent Classroom (恐怖女子高校 女暴力教室, Kyōfu joshikōkō: Onna bōryoku kyōshitsu) (29 September 1972)
- Lustful shogun and his twentyone mistresses (エロ将軍と二十一人の愛妾, Ero shogun to nijyuichi nin no aisho) (2 December 1972)
- Girl Boss Revenge: Sukeban (女番長, Sukeban) (13 January 1973)
- Aesthetics of a Bullet (鉄砲玉の美学, Teppōdama no bigaku) (10 February 1973)
- Terrifying Girls' High School: Lynch Law Classroom (恐怖女子高校 暴行リンチ教室, Kyōfu joshikōkō: bōkō rinchi kyōshitsu) (31 March 1973)
- Girl Boss: Escape From Reform School (女番長 感化院脱走, Sukeban – Kankain Dasso) (24 May 1973)
- Criminal Woman: Killing Melody (前科おんな 殺し節, Zenka onna: koroshi-bushi) (27 October 1973)
- Zero Woman: Red Handcuffs (０課の女 赤い手錠, Zeroka no onna: Akai wappa) (21 May 1974)
- Preparation for the Festival (祭りの準備, Matsuri no junbi) (8 November 1975)
- Nagasaki Hangachōu (長崎犯科帳, Nagasaki Hangachōu) (TV series) (1975)
- Violent Panic: The Big Crash (暴走パニック大激突, Boso panikku: Dai gekitotsu) (28 February 1976)

== Sources ==
- "Miki Sugimoto: Biography". pinky-violence.com. Archived from the original on 2008-04-02.
- "Miki Sugimoto". at The Complete Index to World Film.
- 杉本美樹 (Sugimoto Miki) at the Japanese Movie Database (in Japanese)
