= Norifumi Suzuki =

Japanese film director

- Japanese: 鈴木 則文
- Born: November 26, 1933; Shizuoka, Shizuoka
- Died: May 15, 2014 (aged 80)
- Other name: Noribumi Suzuki
- Occupations: Film director, screenwriter
- Years active: 1968–1990

Norifumi Suzuki (鈴木 則文, Suzuki Norifumi; November 26, 1933 – May 15, 2014), was a Japanese film director and screenwriter. He is best known for the Torakku Yarō series.

== Biography ==
Suzuki was born in 1933 in Shizuoka. He dropped out of Ritsumeikan University's Department of Economics, and subsequently joined Toei's Kyoto Studio as an assistant director in 1956, learning his craft under Masahiro Makino, Tai Kato and Tomu Uchida. He made his screenwriting debut on director Kōkichi Uchide's 1963 film Zoku: Tenamonya Sandogasa (co-written with Takaharu Sawada), and his directorial debut in 1965 with Osaka Dokonjō Monogatari: Doerai Yatsu, starring Makoto Fujita.

At the behest of Toei producer Shigeru Okada, Suzuki wrote the script for female gambler film Red Peony Gambler (1968) starring Junko Fuji, which became a hit series spanning eight films.

He directed Star of David: Beautiful Girl Hunter (1979).

His 1975 film Torakku Yarō: Goiken Muyō, starring Bunta Sugawara and co-written with Shinichiro Sawai, was also a huge success and spawned nine sequels.

After directing and co-writing Kōtaro Makaritōru! (1984), Suzuki left Toei to go freelance.

At the 1985 Yokohama Film Festival, he was awarded a special prize for his career.

Suzuki's last film was Binbari High School, released in 1990 and produced by Kōji Wakamatsu. He died at the age of 80 in May 2014.

== Filmography ==
=== As director ===
- Shinobi no Manji (1968)
- Kyōdai Jingi Gyakuen no Sakazuki (1968)
- Hibotan Bakuto: Isshuku Ippan (1968)
- Shiruku Hatto no Ō-oyabun: Chobi-hige no Kuma a.k.a. Big Boss in a Silk Hat: The Short-Mustached Bear (1970)
- Shiruku Hatto no Ō-oyabun a.k.a. Big Boss in a Silk Hat (1970)
- Mesubachi no Gyakushū (1971)
- The Insatiable (1971)
- Ero Shogun to 21-nin no Aishou a.k.a. The Lustful Shogun and his 21 Concubines (1972)
- Onsen Mimizu Geisha a.k.a. Hot Springs Mimizu Geisha (1972)
- Mesubachi no Chōsen (1972)
- Kyōfu Joshikōkō: Bōryoku Kyōshitsu a.k.a. Women's Violent Classroom (1972)
- Gendai Porno-den: Senten-sei Inpu (1972)
- Tokugawa Sekkusu Kinshi-rei: Ahikijō Daimyō a.k.a. The Erotomaniac Daimyo (1972)
- Onsen Suppon Geisha a.k.a. Hot Springs Turtle Geisha (1972)
- Girl Boss Guerilla (1972)
- Mamushi no Kyōdai: Gōdatsu San-oku-en (1973)
- Sukeban (1973)
- Furyou Anego-den Inoshika Ochou a.k.a. Sex & Fury (1973)
- Terrifying Girls' High School: Lynch Law Classroom (1973)
- School of the Holy Beast (1974)
- Torakku Yarō: Goiken Muyō (1975)
- Torakku Yarō: Bakusō Ichiban Hoshi (1975)
- Shōrinji Kenpō (1975)
- The Erotomania Daimyō (1975)
- Karei naru Tsuiseki a.k.a. The Great Chase (1975)
- Torakku Yarō: Tenka Gomen (1976)
- Torakku Yarō: Hōkyō Ichiban Hoshi (1976)
- Torakku Yarō: Otoko Ippiki Momojirō (1977)
- Torakku Yarō: Dokyō Ichiban Hoshi (1977)
- Dokaben (1977)
- Torakku Yarō: Totsugeki Ichiban Hoshi (1978)
- Torakku Yarō: Ichiban Hoshi Kita e Kaeru (1978)
- Tarao Bannai (1978)
- Torakku Yarō: Neppū 5000 Kiro (1979)
- Torakku Yarō: Furusato Tokkyūbin (1979)
- Star of David: Beautiful Girl Hunter (1979)
- Shogun's Ninja (1980)
- Hoero! Tekken a.k.a. Roaring Fire (1982)
- Iga-no Kabamaru (1983)
- Kōtarō Makari-tōru! (1984)
- Pantsu no ana (1984)
- Karibu: Ai no Shinfoni a.k.a. Caribe: Symphony of Love (1985)
- Ō-oku Jyūhyakkei a.k.a. The Shogunate's Harem (1986)
- Za Aamurai (1987)
- Hei no Naka no Purei Boru (1987)
- Guys Who Never Learn II (1988)
- Bungakushō Satsujin Jiken: Oinaru Jyosō (1989)
- Binbara High School (1990)

=== Screenplay ===
- The Valiant Red Peony (1968)

== Bibliography ==
- Torakku Yaro Fuunroku (2010)
- Toei Gerira Senki (2013)
- Shin Torakku Yaro Fuunroku (2014)

== Awards ==
- 1985: Yokohama Film Festival - Career Award
