= Umemiya =

Umemiya is a surname. Notable people with the surname include:

- Anna Umemiya (born 1972), Japanese television personality
- Tatsuo Umemiya (1938–2019), Japanese actor
