= New Battles Without Honor and Humanity =

New Battles Without Honor and Humanity may refer to:

- New Battles Without Honor and Humanity (1974 film), a Japanese film directed by Kinji Fukasaku
- New Battles Without Honor and Humanity (2000 film), a Japanese film directed by Junji Sakamoto

== See also ==
- Battles Without Honor and Humanity, a Japanese yakuza film series
