= Battles Without Honor and Humanity: Deadly Fight in Hiroshima =

1973 Japanese film by Kinji Fukasaku

- Theatrical release poster
- Directed by: Kinji Fukasaku
- Written by: Kazuo Kasahara; Koji Shundo (concept); Kōichi Iiboshi (original story)
- Produced by: Goro Kusakabe
- Starring: Kinya Kitaoji; Shinichi Chiba; Bunta Sugawara; Meiko Kaji; Mikio Narita
- Narrated by: Satoshi "Tetsu" Sakai
- Cinematography: Sadaji Yoshida
- Edited by: Shintaro Miyamoto
- Music by: Toshiaki Tsushima
- Distributed by: Toei
- Release date: April 28, 1973
- Running time: 99 minutes
- Country: Japan
- Language: Japanese

Battles Without Honor and Humanity: Deadly Fight in Hiroshima (Japanese: 仁義なき戦い 広島死闘篇, Hepburn: Jingi Naki Tatakai: Hiroshima Shitō-hen), also known as Hiroshima Death Match, is a 1973 Japanese yakuza film directed by Kinji Fukasaku. It is the second film in a five-part series that Fukasaku made in a span of just two years. It is the only movie in the series not to focus on Bunta Sugawara's character Shozo Hirono; instead it follows the rise and fall of yakuza hitman Shoji Yamanaka, played by Kinya Kitaoji.

== Plot ==
In 1950 Hiroshima City, gambler Shoji Yamanaka is involved in a fight over cheating in a card game and stabs several men. He is sentenced to two years in prison, where he befriends Shozo Hirono, who is already serving time for murder. Following Yamanaka's release from prison, he visits a restaurant but can't pay his bill. The owner, Yasuko, offers to let him eat for free, but when he insists on paying her with his watch, a gang led by Katsutoshi Otomo, the rebellious son of yakuza patriarch Choji Otomo, beat him severely before the fight is stopped by the senior Otomo. Swearing to take revenge on his attackers, Yamanaka accepts an offer from Boss Muraoka, Yasuko's uncle, to join his yakuza clan. Yamanaka is assigned to the family of Muraoka's sworn brother, Kunimatsu Takanashi, until he is chased out of Hiroshima by Muraoka for beginning a romantic relationship with the widowed Yasuko; Takanashi arranges for him to temporarily join a family in Kyushu.

Yamanaka redeems himself a year later by carrying out a hit for the yakuza family sheltering him, and Muraoka welcomes him back as a formal member in a ceremony witnessed by his associate, Kanichi Tokimori. Katsutoshi is kicked out of the Otomo Family by his father for trying to muscle in on Muraoka's territory and forms his own family with Tokimori's support in a bid to take over Hiroshima. In retaliation, Muraoka expels Tokimori, prohibiting him from conducting any business in the city. Tokimori flees to Kure, while Katsutoshi and his men spark a war by attacking the Muraoka family offices.

In Kure, Hirono's former boss Yoshio Yamamori pays him and his small family to protect Tokimori while he works to resolve the dispute. However, when Yamanaka shows up in Kure with orders to kill Tokimori, Hirono makes his own decision to assassinate Tokimori as a means of both settling the dispute and protecting his friend's honor. The Otomo Family gains new leadership, and Muraoka reconciles with them on the condition that Katsutoshi dissolve his family. Muraoka also gives his blessing for Yamanaka to pursue Yasuko, only to then call on him to kill three of Katsutoshi's men who were planning to assassinate the Otomo Family chairman and reignite the war. Yamanaka is arrested by waiting policemen for the murders and is sentenced to life in prison.

Takanashi, also held for a minor offense, informs Yamanaka that Muraoka is coercing Yasuko into marrying her deceased husband's brother. Yamanaka manages to escape from prison by feigning illness. When he attempts to assassinate his boss, Muraoka suggests that Takanashi may have lied. Yamanaka pleads for another opportunity and offers to eliminate Katsutoshi. Although he only injures him, Katsutoshi is later arrested and sentenced to life imprisonment. His deputy is fatally stabbed after meeting with Muraoka, and the remaining members are jailed. The Otomo Family, weakened by internal strife, is absorbed into the Muraoka Family. Muraoka orders Yamanaka to kill Takanashi for his betrayal but also alerts the authorities, who are ordered to shoot Yamanaka on sight and seal off the entire neighborhood to trap him. Cornered, Yamanaka takes his own life with his gun. At his funeral, Hirono glares angrily at Muraoka, while Yamamori and other mourners praise Yamanaka for preserving his boss's honor.

== Cast ==
- Kinya Kitaoji as Shoji Yamanaka
- Bunta Sugawara as Shozo Hirono
- Shinichi Chiba as Katsutoshi Otomo
- Meiko Kaji as Yasuko Uehara
- Tatsuo Endō as Tokimori Kanichi
- Hiroshi Nawa as Tsuneo Muraoka
- Mikio Narita as Hiroshi Matsunaga
- Asao Koike as Kunimatsu Takanashi
- Shingo Yamashiro as Shoichi Eda
- Hideo Murota as Keisuke Nakahara
- Tatsuo Endo as Kanichi Tokimori
- Yoshi Katō as Choji Otomo
- Kinji Nakamura as Toshio Kuramitsu
- Gin Maeda as Koichi Shimada
- Nobuo Kaneko as Yoshio Yamamori
- Toshie Kimura as Rika Yamamori
- Takuzo Kawatani as Mitsuo Iwashita
- Nobuo Yana as Takuya Asano
- Eizo Kitamura as Eisuke Ishida
- Akira Shioji as monk
- Junko Matsudaira as bar hostess

== Production ==
The second film was ordered on December 21, 1972, before filming was even finished on the first. Toei wanted screenwriter Kazuo Kasahara to depict the Hiroshima war, but Kōichi Iiboshi's articles, on which the films are based, were still being published. Because he did not know the whole story yet and did not want to make another ensemble piece like the first installment, Kasahara decided to tell the dramatic story of Mitsuji Yamagami (name changed to Shoji Yamanaka in the film), a hitman who briefly appeared in the original story. The screenplay took him 65 days to write.

Kasahara flew to Hiroshima on January 10, 1973 for a second meeting with Kōzō Minō, the former yakuza whose journals Iiboshi adapted. However, the material Minō and Yamagami's friend Takeshi Hattori, second president of the Kyosei-kai, provided was not enough. So he collected some interesting stories from the gang who still carried Minō's name.

The writer said he had to make sacrifices to please the audience. Because Hirono was the main character, he had to be in the film, but Minō (whom Hirono is based on) had never met Yamagami. The events also took place right after World War II, but the black market set from the first film could not be rebuilt in time. So Kasahara changed the time-setting from the chaotic post-war period to the 1950s, making Yamagami/Yamanaka's killing spree seem unbelievable, and forced Hirono to appear where it was not necessary. He acknowledged these weak points of the movie.

Kasahara wrote Yamanaka as a patriotic man who was too young to have fought in the war, so he devoted his loyalty to his yakuza boss and killed with a gun instead of a fighter jet. Director Kinji Fukasaku thought it would be too difficult to make the contemporary youth understand this, and wanted the character to be part of the social class that was left out of the economic growth of the 1950s. Ultimately, a compromise of both their visions was used. Kasahara said that he received letters from fans who saw his vision of the character and that Fukasaku later admitted that he realized the audience could understand the war. The writer originally planned an opening scene where Yamanaka is humiliated after being nearly raped in prison, beginning his killing spree. But Minō was against it, something Kasahara chalked up to the fact that Mitsuji Yamagami was still revered among some of the yakuza, and it was removed with the writer believing the characterization suffered as a result. But among all the films in the series, screenwriter Kazuo Kasahara likes the second the best.

== Release ==
Battles Without Honor and Humanity has been released on home video and aired on television, the latter with some scenes cut. In 1980, the first four films were edited into a 224-minute compilation which was given a limited theatrical release and broadcast on Toei's TV network. A Blu-ray box set compiling all five films in the series was released on March 21, 2013, to celebrate its 40th anniversary.

All five films in the series were released on DVD in North America by Home Vision Entertainment in 2004, under the moniker The Yakuza Papers. A 6-disc DVD box set containing them all was also released. It includes a bonus disc containing interviews with director William Friedkin, discussing the influence of the films in America; subtitle translator Linda Hoaglund, discussing her work on the films; David Kaplan, Kenta Fukasaku, Kiyoshi Kurosawa, a Toei producer and a biographer among others. Arrow Films released a Blu-ray and DVD box set, limited to 2,500 copies, of all five films in the UK on December 7, 2015, and in the US a day later. Special features include an interview with the series fight choreographer Ryuzo Ueno and the 1980 edited compilation of the first four films.

== Reception ==
Battles Without Honor and Humanity: Deadly Fight in Hiroshima was the twelfth highest-grossing film of 1973. On Kinema Junpo's annual list of the best films for the year as voted by critics, it ranked thirteenth.
