= This Day's Life =

- Japanese movie poster
- Directed by: Tomotaka Tasaka
- Written by: Tsutomu Sawamura; Tomotaka Tasaka
- Produced by: Nikkatsu
- Distributed by: Nikkatsu
- Release date: June 26, 1957
- Running time: 156 minutes
- Country: Japan
- Language: Japanese

This Day's Life (今日のいのち, Kyō no Inochi) is a 1957 black and white Japanese film drama directed by Tomotaka Tasaka.

== Cast ==
- Yujiro Ishihara
- Mie Kitahara
- Masahiko Tsugawa
- Nobuo Kaneko
- Akira Kobayashi
