= Seizō Fukumoto =

Japanese actor (1943–2021)

Seizō Fukumoto (福本 清三, Fukumoto Seizō) (3 February 1943 – 1 January 2021) was a Japanese actor.

== Biography ==
Fukumoto started acting at age 15 in Kyoto, the capital of Japanese cinema. A specialist in film and television jidaigeki set in the Edo period, he most often played a rōnin, but in his hundreds of appearances he took nearly every role. His forte was kirareyaku, the person who loses the sword fight. His signature death move was the Ebi-zori, translated into 'prawn bend'. It is reported he has been killed over 50,000 times on screen.

In addition, he appeared in modern dramas in roles such as police and yakuza. The American film The Last Samurai brought him before an international audience in the role of the Silent Samurai.

Fukumoto played a lead role for the first time in the film Uzumasa Limelight.

== Death ==
Fukumoto died on 1 January 2021, at his home in Kyoto, due to lung cancer. He was 77 years old.

== Filmography ==
=== Film ===
- Ninpō-chushingura (1965)
- Battles Without Honor and Humanity (1973)
- Battles Without Honor and Humanity: Deadly Fight in Hiroshima (1973)
- Battles Without Honor and Humanity: Proxy War (1973)
- Battles Without Honor and Humanity: Police Tactics (1974)
- Gambling Den Heist (1975)
- New Battles Without Honor and Humanity: The Boss's Head (1975)
- New Battles Without Honor and Humanity: The Boss's Last Days (1976)
- The Fall of Ako Castle (1978)
- Nihon no Fixer (1979)
- Sanada Yukimura no Bōryaku (1979)
- Roaring Fire (1982) - Ikeda Hinoharu
- Ninja Wars (1982)
- Shogun's Shadow (1989)
- New Battles Without Honor and Humanity (2000)
- The Last Samurai (2003)
- Chō Ninja Tai Inazuma! (2006) - Rōnin
- Engine Sentai Go-onger: Boom Boom! Bang Bang! GekijōBang!! (2008) - Samurai
- OOO, Den-O, All Riders: Let's Go Kamen Riders (2011) - General Black
- Uzumasa Limelight (2014, Leading actor) - Seiichi
- Gohan (2017) - Nishiyama
- 108: Revenge and Adventure of Goro Kaiba (2019)
- BLACKFOX: Age of the Ninja (2019)

=== Television ===
- The Yagyu Conspiracy (1978) - Kitano
- Juuken Sentai Gekiranger (33) - Head Samurai
- Seibu Keisatsu
- The Unfettered Shogun V - Episode 26

== Awards ==
- Japan Academy Prize Special Award from the Association (2004)
- Fantasia International Film Festival Best Actor Award (2014)
