= Battles Without Honor and Humanity: Final Episode =

1974 Japanese film by Kinji Fukasaku

- Theatrical release poster
- Directed by: Kinji Fukasaku
- Written by: Koji Takada; Kōichi Iiboshi (original story)
- Produced by: Goro Kusakabe
- Starring: Bunta Sugawara; Akira Kobayashi; Kinya Kitaoji; Joe Shishido
- Narrated by: Satoshi "Tetsu" Sakai
- Cinematography: Sadaji Yoshida
- Edited by: Shintaro Miyamoto
- Music by: Toshiaki Tsushima
- Distributed by: Toei Company
- Release date: June 29, 1974
- Running time: 97 minutes
- Country: Japan
- Language: Japanese
- Box office: ¥371,000,000

Battles Without Honor and Humanity: Final Episode (Japanese: 仁義なき戦い 完結篇, Hepburn: Jingi Naki Tatakai: Kanketsu-hen) is a 1974 Japanese yakuza film directed by Kinji Fukasaku. It is the final film in a five-part series that Fukasaku made in a span of just two years.

== Plot ==
Following the previous film, Shozo Hirono is serving seven years in prison and Akira Takeda was released from prison on a technicality. Takeda then united all the families in the Hiroshima region, shed their yakuza image, and formed the Tensei Coalition political party. In August 1965, Takeda is leader as Chairman, Katsutoshi Otomo is Vice Chairman, Tamotsu Matsumura is Managing Director, Hideo Hayakawa is Secretary General, and Shoichi Eda a Director. Hirono's men get into an altercation with some low-level Tensei members. Elder yakuza Otomo and Hayakawa demand the instigators should have to commit yubitsume, however, after a vote the Coalition agrees to let Matsumura handle discipline on account of wanting to avoid the rituals tied to yakuza for their public image. In 1966, Hirono's friend Terukichi Ichioka has a Tensei financial adviser killed and attends the funeral, angering Otomo who openly vows to take him on. However, Takeda threatens that anyone who responds to the attack will be expelled from Tensei.

Sensing tension brewing, the police raid Tensei's various offices and find illegal firearms, leading to Takeda's arrest. However, earlier that day Takeda called an emergency meeting to pick his acting successor should he be arrested. Takeda nominated Matsumura while Hayakawa nominated Otomo, but Takeda had scripted the voting to have his nominee chosen in order to have a fresh face not well-associated with yakuza. Immediately upon Takeda's arrest, Otomo and Hayakawa sir up discontent amongst the member of the coalition. Otomo then sends men to kill Matsumura. However, when Otomo is released on bail in 1968, Matsumura allows him to return to Tensei. Hayakawa lures Otomo into a meeting with Ichioka, with the later two formally swearing brotherhood the next day in order to take down Matsumura.

In 1969, Masakichi Makihara is paroled from prison and both the Tensei and Otomo/Hayakawa vie for his support, with the former ultimately buying it. At the same time, Toyoaki Mano of the Otomo family and Ichimatsu Kubota of the Hayakawa leave their bosses and join the Tensei Coalition for a large payoff. Several days later, when Ichioka has his men stirring trouble in Tensei turf, Mano falsely reports to his boss that Matsumura has gone on a trip in order for Matsumura to have Ichioka killed while off guard. Otomo learns Mano betrayed him, and after Hayakawa ignores his call for help avenging Ichioka, he dazedly walks into public openly carrying guns and is arrested.

Matsumura then announces the Tensei Coalition is no longer a political group and demands each member swear loyalty to him as boss, with only Hayakawa refusing and announcing retirement. When Takeda is released from prison in 1970, he resumes his position and begins planning how do deal with Hirono's impending release. All the families stir in regard to his upcoming release, including his own, with one member killing Makihara. Knowing the tension over his release, the police discharge Hirono hours early and he travels to Tokyo. Takeda finds Hirono and informs him of Tensei's decision that they can not allow him to return to Hiroshima unless he retires. Even after Takeda claims he will retire himself, Hirono disagrees. Matsumura visits Hirono in Matsuyama to tell him Takeda has retired and to make a proposition of his own; If Hirono will retire, his right-hand man Atsushi Ujiie can join the Tensei Coalition. Hirono tells Matsumura to clean out his own dissenters in Tensei before he will give his answer.

In preparation for his formal installation as Chairman, Matsumura travels to Osaka inviting different guests. During the trip, remnants of the Otomo and Hayakawa families shoot up his car while stopped at a train crossing, resulting in Eda's death and Matsumura seriously injured. Despite his serious condition, Matsumura goes through with the ceremony, with Hirono attending and asking for a seat for Ujiie. Seeing that the new generation of yakuza has moved on without them, Takeda asks Hirono if he would like to drink together sometime. Hirono declines, saying that he would only feel guilty for all the men who died. After a member of Hirono's family is killed in retaliation for Makihara and he sees the deceased's sister dressing the body, Hirono decides to retire.

== Cast ==
- Bunta Sugawara as Shozo Hirono
- Akira Kobayashi as Akira Takeda
- Kinya Kitaoji as Tamotsu Matsumura
- Joe Shishido as Katsutoshi Otomo
- Junkichi Orimoto as Hideo Hayakawa
- Kunie Tanaka as Masakichi Makihara
- Shingo Yamashiro as Shoichi Eda
- Hiroki Matsukata as Terukichi Ichioka
- Goichi Yamada as Toyoaki Mano
- Mizuho Suzuki as Hirate
- Goro Ibuki as Atsushi Ujiie
- Nobuo Kaneko as Yoshio Yamamori
- Asao Uchida as Kenichi Okubo
- Isao Konami as Ichimatsu Kubota
- Harumi Sone as Miyaji Senno
- Takuzo Kawatani as Matsumura family member
- Yumiko Nogawa as Kaoru Sugita
- Nobuo Yana as Ryosuke Kaga
- Kenichi Sakuragi as Akio Saeki
- Sanae Nakahara as Shizuko Murata
- Hiroko Fuji as Sumiko
- Maki Tachibana as Mitsuko
- Yuke Kagawa as Eri

== Production ==
Battles Without Honor and Humanity: Final Episode is the only film in the pentalogy adapting Kōichi Iiboshi's articles about a yakuza war that was not written by Kazuo Kasahara. Instead the screenplay was written by Koji Takada. Kasahara was supportive of Takada, giving him all the research materials he had created for the first four films. However, he said there was not enough material for a fifth film and Takada admitted the research ended up not being very useful for his story. Takada said this was because the characters had to become a "respectable" organization throughout Western Japan by the end.

Kasahara suggested not to use the character played by Kinya Kitaoji because it was based on a real yakuza boss that Takada met in Hiroshima (Hisashi Yamada of the Kyosei-kai), but Takada disregarded the advice. The screenwriter said that the real yakuza saw the film and caused problems with the studio. He revealed that one of the problems they ran into was Bunta Sugawara's schedule, and commented that Sugawara might not have been enthusiastic to do another sequel.

Like Kasahara, Takada met with Kōzō Minō, the former yakuza whose journals Iiboshi adapted, several times. The screenwriter said that Minō told him he did not like the first four films in the series and proceeded to show him a manuscript for a film he had written himself.

Wanting to change the dynamics of the relationships seen in the previous films, Takada created the characters played by Joe Shishido and Hiroki Matsukata. Finding the yakuza ritual of exchanging sake in the prior films ridiculous, he had the two exchange whiskey instead, which he called one of the best scenes in the series. He made a point to show the general unhappiness of the low-leveled members of the gang.

Ultimately, Takada thinks the script was successful and claimed that Kasahara, director Kinji Fukasaku, and producer Goro Kuasakabe all thought so as well. Although, some critics said the film talks about yakuza who make a living hiding behind legitimate businesses while actually depicting the opposite, and the writer agreed with this critique.

== Release ==
Battles Without Honor and Humanity has been released on home video and aired on television, the latter with some scenes cut. A Blu-ray box set compiling all five films in the series was released on March 21, 2013, to celebrate its 40th anniversary.

All five films in the series were released on DVD in North America by Home Vision Entertainment in 2004, under the moniker The Yakuza Papers. A 6-disc DVD box set containing them all was also released. It includes a bonus disc containing interviews with director William Friedkin, discussing the influence of the films in America; subtitle translator Linda Hoaglund, discussing her work on the films; David Kaplan, Kenta Fukasaku, Kiyoshi Kurosawa, a Toei producer and a biographer among others. Arrow Films released a Blu-ray and DVD box set, limited to 2,500 copies, of all five films in the UK on December 7, 2015, and in the US a day later. Special features include an interview with the series fight choreographer Ryuzo Ueno and with Final Episode's screenwriter Koji Takada.
