= New Battles Without Honor and Humanity (2000 film) =

- Film poster
- Directed by: Junji Sakamoto
- Written by: Kōji Takada; Kōichi Iiboshi (story)
- Produced by: Yukiko Shii; Izumi Toyoshima; Toshio Zushi
- Starring: Etsushi Toyokawa; Tomoyasu Hotei; Shō Aikawa; Ittoku Kishibe; Kōichi Satō
- Cinematography: Norimichi Kasamatsu
- Edited by: Takeo Araki
- Music by: Tomoyasu Hotei
- Distributed by: Toei
- Release date: November 25, 2000 (Japan)
- Running time: 109 minutes
- Country: Japan
- Language: Japanese

New Battles Without Honor and Humanity (Japanese: 新・仁義なき戦い。, Hepburn: Shin Jingi Naki Tatakai.), also known as Another Battle, is a 2000 Japanese yakuza film directed by Junji Sakamoto. It is a remake of Kinji Fukasaku's Battles Without Honor and Humanity series from the 1970s, which were adapted from a series of newspaper articles by journalist Kōichi Iiboshi, that were rewrites of a manuscript originally written by real-life yakuza Kōzō Minō while he was in prison.

Rock musician Tomoyasu Hotei, who plays Tochino Masatatsu, wrote the soundtrack to the film. Its title piece would be reworked and retitled "Battle Without Honor or Humanity" and go on to become a hit both in Japan and internationally. The film was followed by the 2003 film New Battles Without Honor and Humanity/Murder, or Another Battle/Conspiracy, directed by Hajime Hashimoto.

== Synopsis ==
While the film is a remake of the original Battles Without Honor and Humanity series, it has no direct similarities. Set in Osaka, it focuses on former childhood friends Kadoya Kaneo (Etsushi Toyokawa) and Tochino Masatatsu (Tomoyasu Hotei) as their lives cross paths again. Kaneo is now a yakuza member, while Masatatsu is a nightclub owner with a distaste for crime gangs. When a yakuza boss dies, a struggle for his position takes place between Kaneo's boss Awano (Ittoku Kishibe) and the young Nakahira (Kōichi Satō). Nakahira's men try to extort money from Masatatsu, bringing him in between a yakuza battle.

== Cast ==
- Etsushi Toyokawa as Kadoya Kaneo
- Tomoyasu Hotei as Tochino Masatatsu
- Shō Aikawa
- Ittoku Kishibe as Awano
- Kōichi Satō as Nakahira
- Seizō Fukumoto
- Shigeki Terao
- Junkichi Orimoto as Mizoguchi Takeo

== Awards ==
- 2000 Nikkan Sports Film Award for Best Director - Junji Sakamoto
- 2001 Japan Academy Prize for Newcomer of the Year - Tomoyasu Hotei
- 2001 Yokohama Film Festival Award for Best Supporting Actor - Jun Murakami
- 2001 Kinema Junpo Award for Best Director - Junji Sakamoto

== Soundtrack ==
New Battles Without Honor and Humanity

Soundtrack album by Tomoyasu Hotei
- Released: November 29, 2000
- Genre: Soundtrack
- Length: 34:42
- Label: EMI Music Japan
- Producer: Tomoyasu Hotei

The soundtrack to the film was composed and performed by Tomoyasu Hotei, who plays Tochino Masatatsu, with the London Session Orchestra also performing on several tracks. It was released on November 29, 2000 as (新・仁義なき戦い そしてその映画音楽). The first track is the theme of the original 1970's series, composed by Toshiaki Tsushima, while the second is Hotei's version of the same song, which would later be re-titled "Battle Without Honor or Humanity" and become internationally known. The soundtrack peaked at number 41 on the Oricon chart, while "Born to Be Free", which was released as a single earlier in the year, reached number 14.

=== Track listing ===
All tracks are written by Tomoyasu Hotei, except where noted.

No.	Title	Length
1.	"Battles Without Honor and Humanity Theme" (仁義なき戦いのテーマ, music by Toshiaki Tsushima)	1:57
2.	"New Battles Without Honor and Humanity Theme" (新・仁義なき戦いのテーマ)	2:28
3.	"Man's Burden" (男の背中)	0:46
4.	"Destined Reunion" (運命の再会)	1:10
5.	"Dark Premonition" (黒の予感)	2:15
6.	"Unforgettable Past" (忘れられない過去)	1:22
7.	"Conspiracy" (陰謀, music by Simon Hale)	3:25
8.	"Settlement" (オトシマエ)	2:34
9.	"Confusion" (混乱)	0:52
10.	"A Justice Called Revenge" (復讐という名の仁義)	1:39
11.	"Crisis" (危機)	1:58
12.	"The World of (Blank)" (○○○の世の中)	1:34
13.	"A Most Beloved Friend" (最愛の友)	3:46
14.	"Eternal Departure" (永遠の別れ)	0:53
15.	"Love Theme from Battles Without Honor and Humanity" (仁義なき戦い/愛のテーマ)	1:33
16.	"Born to Be Free (Movie)" (BORN TO BE FREE(劇場版))	3:41
17.	"New Battles Without Honor and Humanity Theme/Reprise" (新・仁義なき戦いのテーマ/REPRISE)	2:25
18.	"Born to Be Free" (BORN TO BE FREE)	5:24
Total length:		34:42
