= Battles Without Honor and Humanity: Police Tactics =

1974 Japanese film by Kinji Fukasaku

- Theatrical release poster
- Directed by: Kinji Fukasaku
- Written by: Kazuo Kasahara; Kōichi Iiboshi (original story)
- Produced by: Goro Kusakabe
- Starring: Bunta Sugawara; Akira Kobayashi; Takeshi Katō
- Narrated by: Satoshi "Tetsu" Sakai
- Cinematography: Sadaji Yoshida
- Edited by: Shintaro Miyamoto
- Music by: Toshiaki Tsushima
- Distributed by: Toei Company
- Release date: January 15, 1974
- Running time: 101 minutes
- Country: Japan
- Language: Japanese
- Box office: ¥300,000,000

Battles Without Honor and Humanity: Police Tactics (Japanese: 仁義なき戦い 頂上作戦, Hepburn: Jingi Naki Tatakai: Chojo Sakusen) is a 1974 Japanese yakuza film directed by Kinji Fukasaku. It is the fourth film in a five-part series that Fukasaku made in a span of just two years.

== Plot ==
In fall of 1963, the police crack down on yakuza activities nationwide as the government prepares for the 1964 Summer Olympics. However, the war between the Yamamori Family and the Shinwa Group against an alliance of the Uchimoto, Hirono, and Akashi Families rages on. Bosses Noburo Uchimoto and Shozo Hirono, along with Akashi lieutenant Shinichi Iwai, recruit two additional bosses, Hidemitsu Kawada of the Kawada Family and Tomoji Okajima of the Gisei Group, to their side. One of Hirono's officers is killed by men from the Makihara Family, run by Yamamori's underboss, and Hirono vows to take revenge himself, but others, including his advisor Kenichi Okubo, urge him not to. Akira Takeda, captain of the Yamamori Family, threatens Okubo's life if he doesn't keep Hirono in Kure, as Yamamori has fled to Hiroshima City while he and Makihara continue the war.

The police, knowing that the gangs are spending heavily to bring in reinforcements from across Japan, begin putting the squeeze on their rackets and business interests. When an Uchimoto Family member accidentally kills a drunken civilian, the public demands further action and newspapers begin running stories attacking and demonizing the yakuza. The police put a constant stakeout on Hirono's office, effectively paralyzing him since he is still technically out on parole. The cowardly Uchimoto refuses to take action, while the Akashi Family becomes distracted by their own problems in Tokyo. When Hirono learns that Yamamori will be traveling to Kobe, he secretly leaves his base in disguise planning to kill him personally. However, during the trip, the two men escorting him run off intending to perform the hit themselves. The Akashi Family intercepts them, not wanting to be dishonored by letting Yamamori get killed on their turf. Iwai concocts a plan: he and Hirono arrange a large memorial service for his murdered officer, using it as an excuse to bring in hundreds of men for an attack on Hiroshima City.

Uchimoto is abducted at gunpoint by Takeda and Yamamori and rats on his partners. Yamamori tips the police off to a year-old crime Hirono committed to have him arrested. His arrest forces the attack to be called off, and Yamamori safely returns to Kure so he can crush Hirono's weakened family. After learning that Takeda is having Okajima's girlfriend spy on him, he tricks her into revealing Okajima's location so he can be assassinated, angering Takeda. Shoichi Fujita, a senior Gisei Group member and Okajima's likely successor, retaliates by bombing the headquarters of Yamamori officer Shoichi Eda, and Uchimoto sells out his own men when they decide on a whim to kill Yamamori as a favor to Takeda. Their plan foiled, Uchimoto's men start a public brawl that turns into a shootout, giving the police a convenient excuse to arrest Uchimoto, Yamamori, and several other bosses. Iwai and his men immediately fly to Kure to rebuild the Gisei Group and expand the Akashi Family's influence, while Takeda forms a coalition of Hiroshima yakuza to fight them. He orders a bombing of Boss Akashi's house in Kobe to frame the Shinwa Group, triggering retaliation from the Akashi Family and leading to more violence and arrests.

Kawada, tired of the fighting and wanting to protect his own territory from the Gisei Group, manipulates Yazaki, a low-ranking member of his family, into killing Fujita; Yazaki is caught and sentenced to twenty years for murder. Iwai visits Hirono in jail and explains to him all that has happened, before adding that the Akashi Family is pulling its support as the police have forced them to make peace with the Shinwa Group. Prosecutors build a case against Hirono and his parole is revoked, earning him seven years in prison. Makihara gets three years, Eda five, Yamamori a year and a half (and his wife informs him that the government is willing to buy out one of his businesses for a billion yen after he's released), and Uchimoto cuts a deal to dissolve his family and retire from the yakuza, which gets him off on probation. While waiting in a cold, unheated room to be booked into prison at the film's end, Takeda half-jokingly tells Hirono that he might turn his family into a political committee when he gets out.

== Cast ==
- Bunta Sugawara as Shozo Hirono
- Akira Kobayashi as Akira Takeda
- Takeshi Katō as Noburo Uchimoto
- Tatsuo Umemiya as Shinichi Iwai
- Hiroki Matsukata as Shoichi Fujita
- Nobuo Kaneko as Yoshio Yamamori
- Hideo Murota as Hideo Hayakawa
- Shingo Yamashiro as Shoichi Eda
- Toshio Kurosawa as Shigeru Takemoto
- Kunie Tanaka as Masakichi Makihara
- Shinichiro Mikami as Hidemitsu Kawada
- Ichiro Ogura as Hiroshi Yazaki
- Asao Koike as Tomoji Okajima
- Asao Uchida as Kenichi Okubo
- Harumi Sone as Toshio Ueda
- Tatsuo Endō as Shigeo Aihara
- Nobuo Yana as Isamu Kasai
- Akio Hasegawa as Yasuki Fukuda
- Yukio Miyagi as Ryuji Matsui
- Mayumi Nagisa as Mieko
- Isao Natsuyagi as Hiroshi Sugimoto
- Toshie Kimura as Rika Yamamori
- Mitsuko Aoi as Akemi
- Kinji Nakamura as Kenjiro Ishigami
- Seizō Fukumoto as Tsunehiko Yamazaki
- Mitsue Horikoshi as Aiko Hikarigawa
- Sanae Nakahara as Kikue
- Akira Shioji as jailer

== Production ==
Due to the success of the first film, Toei demanded that screenwriter Kazuo Kasahara finally write about the Hiroshima yakuza war depicted in Kōichi Iiboshi's articles, which are themselves based on the journals of Kōzō Minō, and split it into two films. Kasahara had purposely avoided that part of the story for the first two installments, not only because he was daunted by all the names and relationships that were presented in a complex way, but also because he would have to write about the Yamaguchi-gumi and was concerned about the agreements he made to the people involved in the incidents.

The fourth film began in September 1973. Set after the Hiroshima incidents, Hirono and the lead characters are now high-ranking bosses that do not appear in the battles themselves. Therefore, Kasahara and director Kinji Fukasaku decided to show the violent story from multiple angles in an objective way.

During his fifth visit to Hiroshima Kasahara found that both Minō and Takeshi Hattori, second president of the Kyosei-kai, enjoyed talking about their successful predecessors, but the former bosses refused to talk about the young gangsters that were killed or that committed the murders. So the writer asked the police for information, but they declined as well.

Kasahara collected all his information into a large collage of all the gang fights, but having worked on the series for a year, began to lose sight of what he was doing. Toei was telling him to hurry up, follow the budget, and make it more entertaining. He cited reading a collection of essays by poet Sumita Oyama called "Human Adoration" as the only thing that kept him sane. The screenplay took him 73 days to write.

== Release ==
Battles Without Honor and Humanity has been released on home video and aired on television, the latter with some scenes cut. In 1980, the first four films were edited into a 224-minute compilation and was given a limited theatrical release and broadcast on Toei's TV network. A Blu-ray box set compiling all five films in the series was released on March 21, 2013, to celebrate its 40th anniversary.

All five films in the series were released on DVD in North America by Home Vision Entertainment in 2004, under the moniker The Yakuza Papers. A 6-disc DVD box set containing them all was also released. It includes a bonus disc containing interviews with director William Friedkin, discussing the influence of the films in America; subtitle translator Linda Hoaglund, discussing her work on the films; David Kaplan, Kenta Fukasaku, Kiyoshi Kurosawa, a Toei producer and a biographer among others. Arrow Films released a Blu-ray and DVD box set, limited to 2,500 copies, of all five films in the UK on December 7, 2015, and in the US a day later. Special features include an interview with the series fight choreographer Ryuzo Ueno and the 1980 edited compilation of the first four films.
