= Mikio Narita =

Japanese actor (1935–1990)

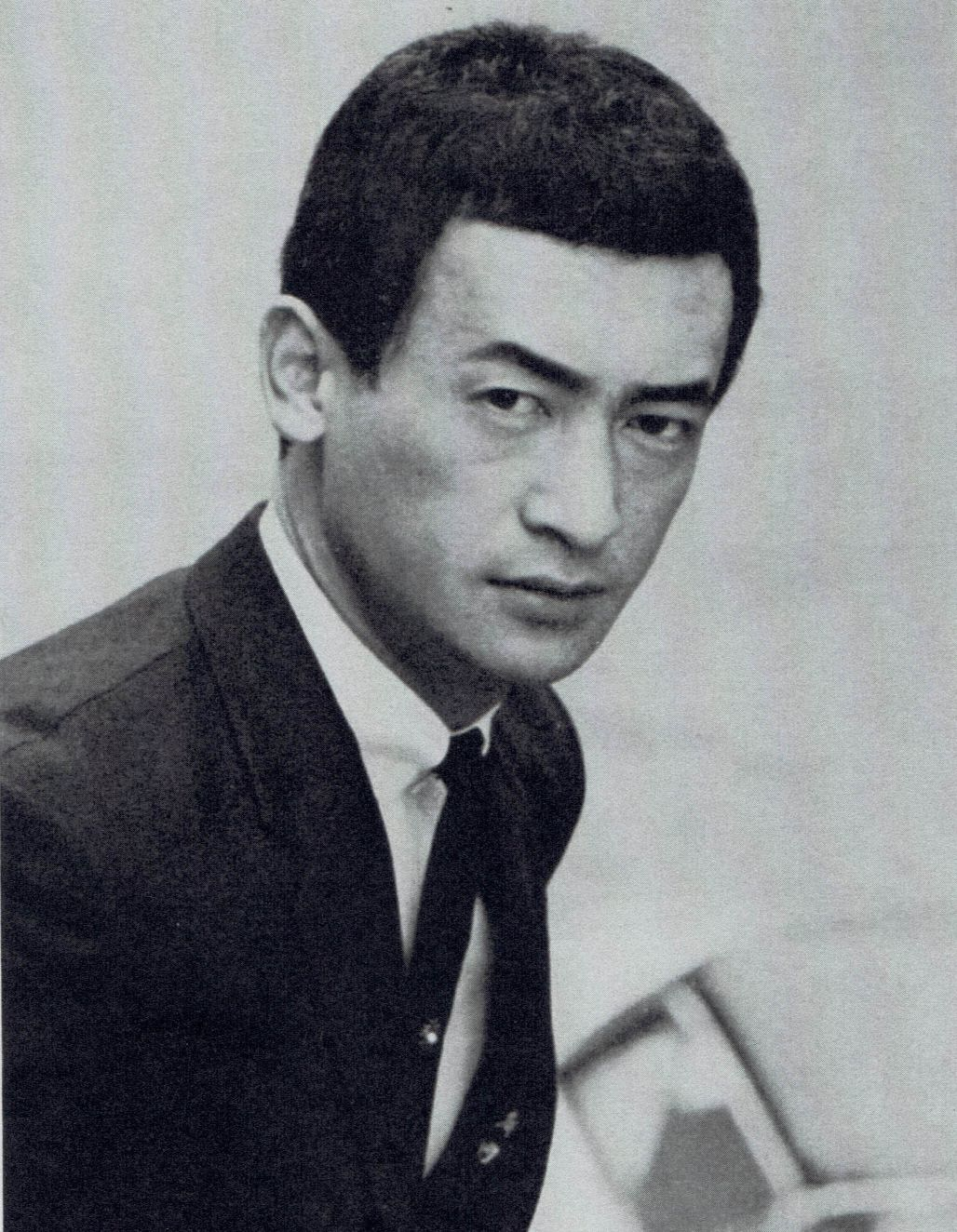
- Narita in 1965
- Born: January 31, 1935; Sakata, Yamagata, Japan
- Died: April 9, 1990 (aged 55); Shibuya-ku, Tokyo, Japan
- Occupation: Actor
- Years active: 1963–1990

Mikio Narita (Japanese: 成田三樹夫, Hepburn: Narita Mikio; 31 January 1935 – 9 April 1990) was a Japanese actor. He was most famous for playing villains, and often worked with Kinji Fukasaku.

Narita graduated from Haiyuza Theatre Company acting school and joined Daiei Film. His career as a screen actor started in 1963. His film debut was the 1963 film Kōkō Sannensei. He gradually won fame by playing the role of the villains. In 1971, Narita left Daiei and became a freelance actor. As a freelance actor he appeared in many yakuza films produced by Toei film company. In Japan he is best known for his role in Tantei Monogatari (TV series). He is also well known for his part in Fukasaku's Battles Without Honor and Humanity series. He also portrayed the evil character in Mito Kōmon (3rd season).

He died of linitis plastica on 9 April 1990. His final film role was in the 1990 film Jipangu.

== Filmography ==
=== Film ===
- Yarareru mae ni yare (1964)
- Zoku kōkō san'nensei (1964) - Tetsuo Murayama
- Yadonashi inu (1964)
- Kenka inu (1964)
- Kenji Kirishima Saburō (1964) - Shinichirō Tatsuta
- Hanzai kyoshitsu (1964)
- Urakaidan (1965) - Inumaru
- Waka oyabun (1965) - Naojiro
- The Hoodlum Soldier (1965) - MP
- Seisaku no tsuma (1965) - MP
- A, zerosen (1965) - Yagi
- Suri (1965)
- Gakusei jingi (1965)
- Mesuinu dassō (1965) - Miyauchi
- Zatoichi and the Chess Expert (1965) - Tadasu Jumonji
- Za gaadoman-Tōkyō ninja (1965)
- Yorū no kunshō (1965)
- Kumo o yobu kōdōkan (1965)
- The Guardman: Tokyo Ninja Butai (1966) - Gorō Kimoto
- Hyoten (1966) - Murai
- Kisama to ore (1966)
- Yabure shomôn (1966)
- Shutsū goku no sakazuki (1966)
- Shin heitai yakuza (1966)
- Heitai yakuza daidasso (1966)
- Abura no shitatari (1967)
- A Certain Killer (1967)
- Nemuri Kyōshirō burai-hikae: Mashō no hada (1967) - Ukon Saegusa
- Yoru no nāwabarî (1967)
- Umī no G-Men: taiheiyō no yojinbō (1967)
- Kaidan otoshiana (1968) - Haruo Kuramoto
- Onna tobakushi tekkaba yaburi (1968)
- Nemuri Kyoshiro engetsu sappo (1969)
- Tejo muyō (1969)
- Showa onna jingi (1969)
- Onna tobakushi saikoro kesshō (1969)
- Onna tobaku-shi tsubo kurabe (1970)
- Abuku zenī (1970)
- Shinjuku outlaw: Step On the Gas (1970)
- Minagoroshi no sukyattō (1970)
- Onna kumichō (1970)
- Ōnna himitsu chosain-kuchibiru ni kakerō (1970)
- Gyakuen Mitsusakazuki (1971)
- Kage Gari Hoero taiho (1972) - Gekko "Sunlight"
- Ōkami yakuza: Tomurai ha ore ga dasu (1972)
- Kage Gari (1972) - Moonlight
- Battles Without Honor and Humanity (1973)
- Battles Without Honor and Humanity: Deadly Fight in Hiroshima (1973) - Matsunaga Hiroshi
- Female Convict Scorpion: Beast Stable (1973) - Detective Kondo
- Battles Without Honor and Humanity: Proxy War (1973) - Matsunaga Hiroshi
- Gendai ninkyō-shi (1973) - Nakagawa
- Hanzo the Razor – Who's Got the Gold? (1974) - Bansaku Tonami
- Kuroi Mehyō M (1974) - Hayami
- Andō-gumi gaiden: Hitokiri shatei (1974)
- Mamushi no kyōdai: Futari awasete sanjuppan (1974)
- Graveyard of Honor (1975) - Noboru Kajiki
- Cops vs. Thugs (1975) - Katsumi Kawade
- Nihon bōryōku rettō: Keihanshin koroshi no gundan (1975)
- Champion of Death (1975) - Nakasone
- New Battles Without Honor and Humanity: The Boss's Head (1975) - Aihara
- New Battles Without Honor and Humanity: The Boss's Last Days (1976) - Koji Matsuoka
- Bakamasa horamasa toppamasa (1976)
- Yakuza Graveyard (1976) - Nozaki
- Okinawa Yakuza sensō (1976) - Onaga
- Yakuza senso: Nihon no Don (1977) - Seiji Kataoka
- Utamaro: Yume to shiriseba (1977) - Tsutaya Jūzaburō
- Hokuriku Proxy War (1977) - Mr. Yobu
- Nihon no jingi (1977) - Takayuki Kawabe
- Rashamen (1977)
- Nishijin Shinju (1977)
- Nippon no Don: Yabohen (1977) - Seiji Kataoka
- Shinjuku yoidore banchi: Hitokiri tetsu (1977)
- Shogun's Samurai (1978) - Ayamaro Karasumasu (Noble)
- Tarao Bannai (1978) - Goro Seo
- Message from Space (1978) - Rockseia XII
- Bandits vs. Samurai Squadron (1978) - Fukuzaemon
- Never Give Up (1978) - Nakado (yakuza)
- The Fall of Ako Castle (1978) - Kato
- Hakuchyu no shikaku (1979) - Kyozo Koiwa
- Aftermath of Battles Without Honor and Humanity (1979) - Takeshi Tsugawa
- Hunter in the Dark (1979) - Gosun
- The Resurrection of the Golden Wolf (1979) - Koizumi
- Sanada Yukimura no Bōryaku (1979) - Goto Matabei
- G.I. Samurai (1979) - Kosa
- Nihon no Fixer (1979)
- Kage no Gundan: Hattori Hanzo (1979)
- Tokugawa ichizoku no houkai (1980)
- Tosa No Ipponzuri (1980) - Yakuza Supervisor
- Samurai Reincarnation (1981) - Izumori Matsudaira
- Kemono-tachi no atsui nemuri (1981) - Nonoyama, Kuroyanagi's secretary
- Hoero tekken (1982) - Reika
- Onimasa (1982) - Tokubei Tsujihara
- Yaju-deka (1982) - Kuroki
- Ninja Wars (1982) - Kashin Koji
- Yōkirō (1983) - Inaso
- Theater of Life (1983) - Hakudo Omizo
- Legend of the Eight Samurai (1983) - Ohta Sukemasa
- Jo no mai (1984) - Yamakan
- Fireflies in the North (1984) - Kido
- Kai (1985) - Bunzo Tanigawa
- Seijo densetsu (1985) - Tachibana
- Saigo no bakuto (1985) - Nobuo Yamatatsu
- Kizudarake no kunshô (1986) - Head of Police
- Be-Bop highschool: Koko yotaro elegy (1986) - Mr. Fujimoto
- The Sea and Poison (1986) - Shibata
- Yakuza Wives (1986) - Akimasa Koiso
- Hissatsu! III Ura ka Omote ka (1986)
- Kuroi doresu no onna (1987) - Ohno
- Sure Death 4: Revenge (1987) - Lord Sakai
- Yoshiwara enjō (1987) - Asaji Kon
- Welter (1987)
- Yakuza tosei no sutekina menmen (1988)
- Ikidomari no Banka: Brake out (1988) - Toda
- Tokugawa no Jotei: Ōoku (1988) - Shogun Ienari
- A Chaos of Flowers (1988) - Harufusa Hatano
- Bakayaro! I'm Plenty Mad (1988) - Tadashi Okawa (Episode 3)
- Gokudo no onna-tachi: San-daime ane (1989) - Ryukichi Terada
- Water Moon (1989)
- Jipangu (1990) - Hayashi Razan (final film role)
- Yomigaeru yusaku: Tantei monogatari tokubetsu hen (1999)

=== Television ===
- Mito Kōmon 3rd season (1971-1972) - Tsuge
- Shin Heike Monogatari (1972) - Fujiwara no Yorinaga
- Taiyō ni Hoero! (1973 ep.17), (1974 ep.193)
- Oshizamurai Kiichihōgan (1973 ep.8), (1974 ep.25)
- Amigasa Jūbei (1974) - Funazu Yakurō
- Edo o Kiru (3rd season) (1977) - Wakizaka Juzō
- The Yagyu Conspiracy (1978) - Karasuma
- Shadow Warriors (I, II, IV)
- Akō Rōshi (1979) - Yanagisawa Yoshiyasu
- Tantei Monogatari (1979-1980) - Detective Hattori
- Tokugawa Ieyasu (1983) - Imagawa Yoshimoto
- Sanbiki ga Kiru! (1988 ep.15)
