= Aftermath of Battles Without Honor and Humanity =

1979 Japanese film by Eiichi Kudo

- Cover of the Blu-ray release
- Directed by: Eiichi Kudo
- Written by: Fumio Kannami; Hiroo Matsuda
- Produced by: Toei Eiga
- Starring: Jinpachi Nezu; Ryudo Uzaki; Mieko Harada; Shigeru Matsuzaki; Hiroki Matsukata; Tsutomu Yamazaki
- Music by: George Yanagi and Rainywood
- Release date: May 26, 1979
- Running time: 128 minutes
- Country: Japan
- Language: Japanese

Aftermath of Battles Without Honor and Humanity (Japanese: その後の仁義なき戦い, Hepburn: Sonogo no Jingi Naki Tatakai) is a 1979 Japanese film directed by Eiichi Kudo. Although originally planned as the first entry of a new series in the Battles Without Honor and Humanity franchise, Aftermath turned out to be a lone entry and Toei refers to the film as an "extra edition" (番外編, bangai-hen) of the series.

== Cast ==
- Jinpachi Nezu as Toshio Aiba
- Mieko Harada as Akiko Negishi
- Ryudo Uzaki
- Shigeru Matsuzaki as Keiichi Mizunuma
- Tsutomu Yamazaki as Shingo Takagi
- Fumio Fujimura as Hideo Hanamura
- Shingo Yamashiro as Hiroshi Kamamoto
- Seizō Fukumoto as Gen Kanemitsu
- Nobuo Kaneko as Hirokichi Asakura
- Asao Koike as Hidenobu Hanamura
- Kayo Matsuo as Ikenaga Satoko
- Ryuji Katagiri as Ken Oba
- Guts Ishimatsu as Genji Wada
- Hōsei Komatsu as Tadashi Tatsuno
- Kenichi Hagiwara (Cameo)
- Hiroshi Miyauchi as Detective Ozawa
- Mikio Narita as Takeshi Tsugawa
- Hiroki Matsukata as Ikenaga Yasuharu
