= Tatsuo Umemiya =

Japanese actor (1938–2019)

- 梅宮 辰夫
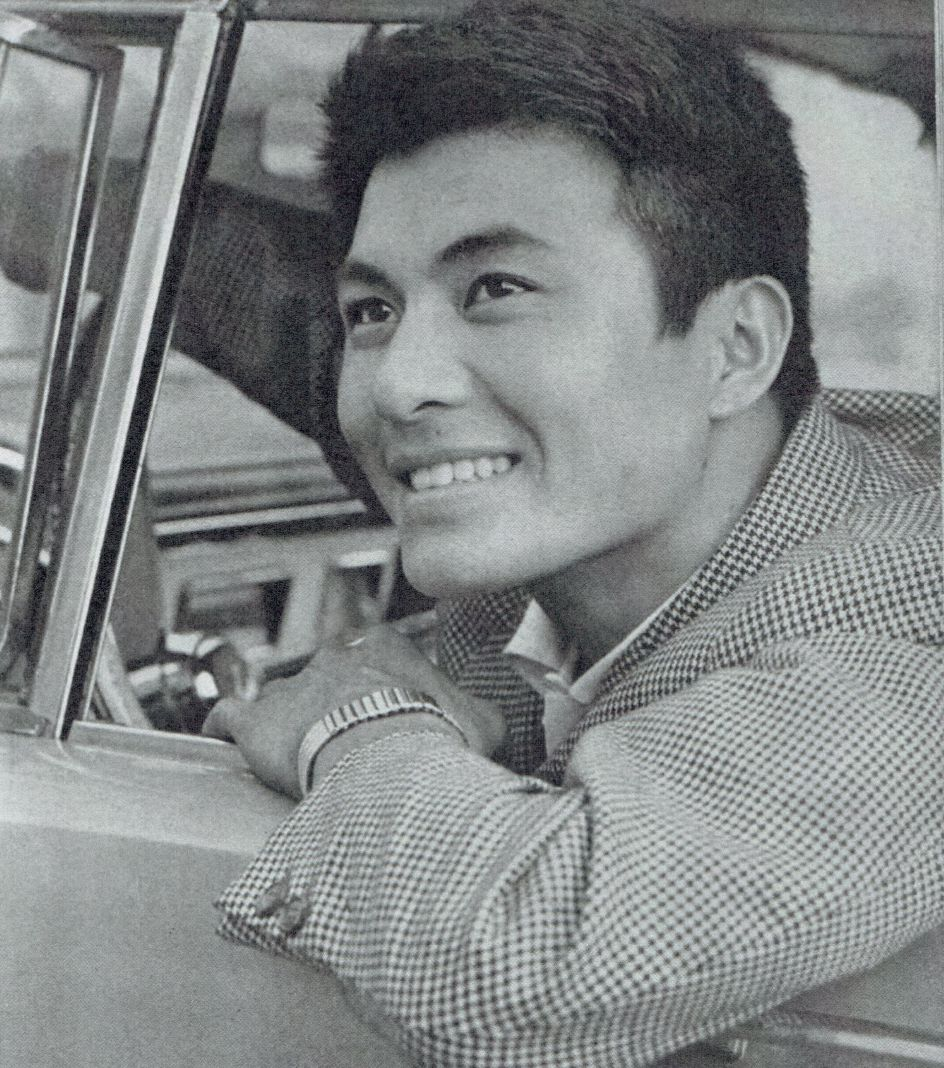
- Umemiya in 1962
- Born: 11 March 1938; Harbin, Manchukuo, Japan
- Died: 12 December 2019 (aged 81)
- Occupations: Actor, tarento, businessman
- Years active: 1959–2013
- Agent: Pickles
- Known for: Yoru no Seishun series; Yoru no Kayō series; Furyō Banchō series; Teiō series; Battles Without Honor and Humanity series; Zenryaku Ofukuro-sama; Hagure Keiji Junjō-ha series
- Height: 1.74 m (5 ft 9 in)
- Spouse: Claudia Umemiya
- Children: Anna Umemiya (daughter)

Tatsuo Umemiya (梅宮 辰夫, Umemiya Tatsuo; 11 March 1938 – 12 December 2019) was a Japanese actor, tarento, and businessman. He was represented by the agency Pickles. His daughter is model and tarento Anna Umemiya.

The son of a doctor, Umemiya gave up a medical career to debut as a Toei New Face at the Toei Studios. As an actor, he appeared in films and television dramas and also in restaurant variety shows.

Umemiya died of kidney failure on 12 December 2019. He was 81 years old.

== Filmography ==
Year	Title	Role	Ref.
1959	Shōnen Tantei-dan: Teki wa Genshi Senkō-tei		
1959	Planet Prince		
1962	Ankoku-gai Saigo no Hi		
1962	Gang vs. G-Men	Masao Kuroki	
1963	Jinsei Gekijō: Hisha-kaku		
1963	Dai Hachiku ute Itai: Sō Retsu o ni Tai Chō		
1963	Shōwa Kyōkaku den		
1965	Himo		
1965	Shōwa Zankyō Den		
1966	Rampaging Dragon of the North		
1967	Abashiri Prison		
1968	Ningen Gyorai: Ā Kaiten Tokubetsu Kōgeki-tai	Keijishoi Yoshioka	
1968	Furyō Banchō		
1968	Yoru no Kayō		
1970	Teiō		
1970	Bloodstained Clan Honor		
1972	Wandering Ginza Butterfly	Shinnosuke Matsudaira	
1973	Battles Without Honor and Humanity	Hiroshi Wakasugi	
1973	Battles Without Honor and Humanity: Proxy War	Shinichi Iwai	
1974	Battles Without Honor and Humanity: Police Tactics	Shinichi Iwai	
1974	Ninkyō Hanaichirin	Masashi Yashiro	
1974	Yamaguchi-gumi Gaiden: Kyuushuu Shinkou Sakusen	Ichiro Ishino	
1974	The Rapacious Jailbreaker	Suenaga	
1975	Gokudō Shachō	Sumitomo Mitsui	
1975	Bōryoku Kinmyaku	Kenji Okuda	
1975	Nihon Bōryoku Rettō: Keihanshin-goroshi no Gundan	Koji Kanemitsu	
1975	Cops vs. Thugs	Shoichi Kaida	
1975	Gambling Den Heist	Noshiro	
1975	Shikin-gen Gōdatsu	Fumiaki Noshiro	
1975	Graveyard of Honor	Kozaburo Imai	
1976	Karate Warriors		
1976	Terror of Yakuza	Yoshiaki Kaizu	
1976	Yakuza Graveyard	Goro Iwata	
1976	Jitsuroku Gaiden: Ōsaka Dengeki Sakusen	Heikichi Miyatake	
1976	Track Yarō: Bōkyō Ichibanhoshi	Dai Kumada Taro Jirozaemon	
1977	Yakuza Sensō: Nihon no Shuryō	Fukushima	
1978	Never Give Up	Akio Izaki	
1978	Bandits vs. Samurai Squadron	Judayu Araki	
1979	Sanada Yukimura no Bōryaku	Sanada Nobuyuki	
1979	Akuma ga Kirite Fue o Fuku	Shunroku Kazama	
1979	Nihon no Fixer	Takayoshi Oguri	
1980	Furyō Shōnen	Asamoto	
1980	Tokugawa Ichizoku no Hōkai	Ōkubo Toshimichi	
1982	Onimasa	Masaru Yamane	
1982	Dai Nippon Teikoku	Heiso Hige	
1983	Shōsetsu Yoshida Gakkō	Ichirō Kōno	
1986	Keshin	Nomura	
1988	Be-Bop High School: Kōkō Yotarō Ondo	Principal	
1989	226	Sanno Hotel manager	
2002	Shura no Mure		
2008	Tokumei Kakarichō Hitoshi Tadano: Saigo no Gekijō-ban	Shigezo Kurokawa	

=== TV series ===
Year	Title	Role	Network	Notes
1964	Niji no Sekkei		NHK	
1966	Three Outlaw Samurai		Fuji TV	
1968	Nihon Kenkaku-den		TV Asahi	Episode 9
1969	Ā Chūshingura	Horibe Yasubei	KTV, Fuji TV	
1969	Playgirl		TV Tokyo	Episodes 12, 16, 58, 162
1969	FLower Action 009 no 1		Fuji TV	Episode 1
1975	Zatoichi Monogatari		Fuji TV	Episode 16
1975	Yoake no Keiji	Motomiya	TBS	Episode 28
1975	Zenryaku Ofukuro-sama	Suji Murai	NTV	
1977	Shin Yoake no Keiji	Asakura	TBS	
1977	Ashita no Keiji	Asakura	TBS	
1978	Edo Professional Hissatsu Shōbainin	Shinji	ABC	
1980	Shin Edo no Senpū	Asakichi	Fuji TV	Episode 1
1980	Sayonara o Ryū-san		MBS	
1980	Yōki na Tōbō	Daisaku Fujimura	Fuji TV	
1981	Keishichō Satsujin-ka	Hirata	TV Asahi	
1982	Keiji Yoroshiku	Kannami leader	TBS	
1982	Ōedo Sōsamō	Tasukunokai Mitani	TV Tokyo	Episode 544
1984	School Wars: Hero	Daizaburo Shimoda	TBS	
1985	Star Tanjō	Kohei Kaga	Fuji TV	
1986	Kono ko Dare no Ko	Tsuruta	Fuji TV	
1988	The School Cup	Reformatory director	Fuji TV	
1988	Tonbo	Kenzo Takeshiri	TBS	
1988	Hagure Keiji Junjō-ha	Shigetada	TV Asahi	
1989	Gomendo Kakemasu		Fuji TV	
1990	Binta	Seijiro Hanai	TBS	
1991	Lullaby Keiji	Kenzo Hagiwara	TV Asahi	
1992	Mei Bugyō Tōyama no Kin-san	Daishiro Hanayama	TV Asahi	4th Series, Episode 8
1993	Ueno-eki Satsujin Jiken	Naito	TBS	
1993	Akai Meikyū		TBS	
1994	Dai Chūshingura	Tomekichi	TBS	
1994	Coming Home		TBS	
1995	Yureru Omoi		TBS	
	Tokumei Kakarichō Hitoshi Tadano	Shigezo Kurokawa	TV Asahi	
	Tōbō-sha Joichiro Kijima	Yamashiro	Fuji TV	
	Haikei, Chichiue-sama		Fuji TV	
1999	Double Couple Tantei		Fuji TV	
2000	Obasan Kaichō Murasaki no Hanzai Seisō Nikki Gomi wa Koroshi o Shitte Iru Series	Sanzo Onogi	TBS	
2008	Hadaka no Taishō – Miyazaki-hen – Miyazaki no Onigawarau no de		Fuji TV	
2008	Yumeko Hinata Chōtei Iin Jiken-bo	Zenzo Hinata	Fuji TV	
2012	Shira Rezaru Bakumatsu no Shishi: Yamada Akiyoshi Monogatari	Itō Hirobumi	MBS	
2013	Nanohana Line ni Norikaete	Yoshisaburo Kamogawa	NHK BS Premium	

=== Anime ===
Title	Role	Network
Government Crime Investigation Agent Jotaro Zaizen	Aban Narration	TV Asahi

=== Variety ===
Title	Network	Notes
Kuishinbo! Banzai	Fuji TV	Reporter
Shingo no Omachi do O-sama	TBS	Regular appearances, charge in cuisine corner
Akko no Karu ku Mite Mitai	TBS	
Iron Chef	Fuji TV	
Sekai no Chō Gōka Chinpin Ryōri	Fuji TV	Quasi-regular appearances
The Letters: Kazoku no Ai ni Arigatō	Fuji TV	Regular appearances
Kazuo Tokumitsu no Kandō Saikai "Aitai"	TBS	
Geinōjin Kakuzu ke Check	ABC	
Peke×Pon	Fuji TV	

=== Advertisements ===
Year	Title	Notes
	Bubble Star	Co-starring with Sonny Chiba, Hiroki Matsukata, Kin'ya Kitaōji, and Shingo Yamashiro
	Takara Hon Mirin	
	Konjac to Kaisō Salad	Co-starring with his daughter Anna
2010	CupStar	
2014	Magic Bullet	

== Discography ==
=== Singles ===
Year	Title	Ref.
1962	"Haha Koi Yakuza / Ginza no Fūraibō"	
1966	"Yūkyō Mitsuyo / Sakazuki-bushi"	
	"Banchō Sharrock / Sakazuki yo Omaedake"	
	"Banchō Bruce / Ore wa Banchō"	
	"Banchō Shinjuku Jingi / Yume wa Yoru Hiraku"	
	"Banchō Kazoe-uta / Norainu"	
	"Otoko Banchō Nagareboshi / Bangaichi Bruce"	
1970	""	
1970	"Diamond Rock / Usshisshi-bushi"	
	"Symbol Rock / Yoru wa Ore no Mono"	
	"Tatsuo Umemiya no Tokyo Nagare-uta / Banchō"	
1971	"Gara Janakatta Koi Nanka / Otoko Nakase no Kiri ga Furu"	
1971	"Kaikon no Uta / Sasurai no Waltz"	
	"Tatsu-chan no Seishun Nikki / Tatsu Ani i no Sandogasa"	
	"Sakariba Banchō / Jinsei gekijō"	
	"Moteta Tsumori no Kazoe-uta / On'na Machi Miren"	
1982	"Tsuyogari / Otoko Hitori"	

=== Albums ===
Title
Yoasobi no Teiō
Jinsei Gekijō / Furyō banchō
Otoko no Enka
