= Gesshoku =

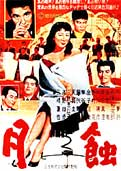
- Japanese movie poster
- Directed by: Umetsugu Inoue
- Produced by: Nikkatsu
- Release date: 19 December 1956
- Country: Japan
- Language: Japanese

Gesshoku (月蝕) is a 1956 black-and-white Japanese film directed by Umetsugu Inoue.

== Cast ==
- Tatsuya Mihashi : Tadokoro Kazuma
- Yumeji Tsukioka : Ikegami Ayako
- Masumi Okada : Leo
- Nobuo Kaneko : Takei
- Toru Abe : Takasaki
- Yujiro Ishihara : Matsuki
