= Battles Without Honor and Humanity: Proxy War =

1973 Japanese film by Kinji Fukasaku

- Theatrical release poster
- Directed by: Kinji Fukasaku
- Written by: Kazuo Kasahara; Koji Shundo (concept); Kōichi Iiboshi (original story)
- Produced by: Goro Kusakabe
- Starring: Bunta Sugawara; Akira Kobayashi; Takeshi Katō; Mikio Narita; Kunie Tanaka; Nobuo Kaneko
- Narrated by: Satoshi "Tetsu" Sakai
- Cinematography: Sadaji Yoshida
- Edited by: Kozo Horiike
- Music by: Toshiaki Tsushima
- Distributed by: Toei Company
- Release date: September 25, 1973
- Running time: 102 minutes
- Country: Japan
- Language: Japanese

Battles Without Honor and Humanity: Proxy War (Japanese: 仁義なき戦い 代理戦争, Hepburn: Jingi Naki Tatakai: Dairi Senso) is a 1973 Japanese yakuza film directed by Kinji Fukasaku. It is the third film in a five-part series that Fukasaku made in a span of just two years, focusing on the events prior to a major war between Hiroshima yakuza in the early 1960s.

== Plot ==
In September 1960, Fumio Sugihara, who is serving as the temporary boss of the Muraoka Family, is assassinated while walking with Hirono Family patriarch Shozo Hirono and Muraoka underboss Noburo Uchimoto. At Sugihara's funeral, one of the guests vomits on Sugihara's remains and hastily leaves the ceremony. The others know that the man, a yakuza from Kyushu, was beaten by Sugihara in an argument and probably vomited on purpose. Hirono and Muraoka Family officers Hiroshi Matsunaga and Akira Takeda ask Uchimoto, the sworn brother of the deceased, to punish the man for his act of disrespect, but he refuses, much to their anger.

Hirono beats one of his men, Saijo, for stealing before meeting with his adviser Kenichi Okubo, the man who oversaw his induction into the yakuza. Okubo explains that Hirono has to switch parole guarantors to avoid going back to jail, recommending Hirono's former boss Yoshio Yamamori, who he renounced loyalty to years earlier. Even after learning that Yamamori only suggested it because Boss Muraoka is retiring, Hirono reluctantly agrees to align his family with Yamamori's. He is subsequently approached by Uchimoto, who is aware of Hirono's friendship with Shinichi Iwai of the large Akashi Family in Kobe, for advice on which Akashi Family member would be willing to swear brotherhood with him; Uchimoto admits he only wants this so he can strengthen his claim to Muraoka's former position as boss. Hirono also takes a young delinquent named Takeshi Kuramoto into his family at the request of his mother and former school teacher after Kuramoto badly injures a drunken man who happens to be a yakuza associate.

That summer, Muraoka officer Soichi Eda is released from prison and he, Hirono, Uchimoto, Takeda, and Matsunaga all become sworn brothers. In June of the following year, thanks to Hirono's intervention, Uchimoto's request is approved and he swears an oath with Shigeo Aihara, who is a sworn brother of Akashi Family boss Tetsuo Akashi. This leaves only one viable rival to the Akashi's dominance in Japan, a yakuza clan based in Kobe known as the Shinwa Group. The Akashi Family and the Shinwa Group rally the various families sworn to them and begin fighting all across Japan, leaving countless yakuza dead or incarcerated as the battle quickly spills over into Hiroshima.

In a conversation with Hirono, Aihara reveals that Uchimoto is trying to swear loyalty to Boss Akashi despite having already done the same with Boss Muraoka, which violates yakuza traditions. Later that evening, Hirono learns from Matsunaga and Takeda that Muraoka is handing control of his family to Yamamori. Hirono, surprised, disagrees and challenges the decision. He is told that Boss Muraoka did so because he is upset with Uchimoto for swearing brotherhood with Aihara, wanting to keep the Akashi Family out of Hiroshima. The others console Hirono by noting that Yamamori's leadership will only be temporary. Uchimoto then walks in, yelling at Hirono because he mistakenly believes that he told the truth about him to Aihara. As a result, Uchimoto's ceremony to become a sworn brother with Boss Akashi has been put off indefinitely. Hirono calls Uchimoto a coward and a disappointment and storms off.

Two months later, Yamamori succeeds Boss Muraoka and merges the two families. Uchimoto is mocked for his cowardice at the after party, prompting him to burst into tears. After everyone else leaves, Uchimoto argues with Hirono, thinking he agreed to Yamamori as boss and kept the succession a secret from him. Uchimoto then threatens to destroy Yamamori and kill Hirono. He and his family use his role as mediator in a conflict between the Hamazaki and Komori Families of Iwakuni to begin a proxy war for control of the Yamamori Family. Yamamori sides with the Hamazaki Family because his underboss Masakichi Makihara is Boss Hamazaki's sworn brother, while Uchimoto backs the Komori Family. Uchimoto is able to settle the dispute on his terms, enhancing his prestige and paving the way for him to pledge loyalty to Boss Akashi. In response, Yamamori formalizes an alliance with the Shinwa Group.

After foiling an assassination attempt ordered by Makihara, Hirono forces Takeda, Matsunaga, and Eda to reconcile with Uchimoto by having Okubo use his influence to threaten their standing in Hiroshima, hoping to damage Yamamori's alliance with the Shinwa Group and compel him to retire. Takeda figures out his plan and persuades Yamamori to have him expelled for instigating the feud, with Matsunaga subsequently retiring from the family rather than act against Hirono. In retaliation for Hirono's expulsion, the Akashi Family forces Uchimoto to cut all of his ties to the Yamamori Family. Kuramoto attempts to kill Makihara at a movie theater, but is gunned down after Saijo, who Makihara paid to betray Hirono, sells him out. His cremation ceremony is shot up in an effort to kill Hirono, who angrily clutches the shattered remains of Kuramoto's urn in his fist as he swears revenge.

== Cast ==
- Bunta Sugawara as Shozo Hirono
- Takeshi Katō as Noburo Uchimoto
- Akira Kobayashi as Akira Takeda
- Mikio Narita as Hiroshi Matsunaga
- Kunie Tanaka as Masakichi Makihara
- Shingo Yamashiro as Shoichi Eda
- Nobuo Kaneko as Yoshio Yamamori
- Tsunehiko Watase as Takeshi Kuramoto
- Hideo Murota as Hideo Hayakawa
- Tatsuo Umemiya as Shinichi Iwai
- Asao Uchida as Kenichi Okubo
- Tatsuo Endō as Shigeo Aihara
- Tetsuro Tanba as Tatsuo Akashi
- Rinichi Yamamoto as Teruo Miyaji
- Masataka Iwao as Shiro Hamazaki
- Daisuke Awaji as Anji Komori
- Harumi Sone as Toshio Ueda
- Masao Hori as Ryuhei Toyoda
- Kinji Nakamura as Yoshikazu Itami
- Hiroshi Nawa as Tuneo Muraoka
- Yasuhiro Suzuki as Fumio Sugihara
- Sen Okaji as Hiromitsu Nagao
- Takuzo Kawatani as Katsuharu Saijo
- Reiko Ike as Tomie
- Toshie Kimura as Rika Yamamori
- Akira Shioji as Hirono and Kuramoto's former teacher
- Masako Araki as Kuramoto's mother
- Eizo Kitamura as Hashizume
- Eiko Nakamura as Ena
- Mitsue Horikoshi as Hiromi, Yamamori's mistress

== Production ==
Due to the success of the first film, Toei demanded that screenwriter Kazuo Kasahara finally write about the Hiroshima yakuza war depicted in Kōichi Iiboshi's articles, which are in-turn based on the journals of Kōzō Minō, and split it into two films. Kasahara had purposely avoided that part of the story for the first two installments, not only because he was daunted by all the names and relationships that were presented in a complex way, but also because he would have to write about the Yamaguchi-gumi and was concerned about the agreements he made to the people involved in the incidents.

He felt that he could only write about the internal struggles (seen in Part 3) and the large battle (seen in Part 4), in which case the movie would not be very cinematic. He did not know how to convey all the subtle and hidden emotions of the characters onto the screen, and that even if he did it would not have enough action. Kasahara told Toei he could not guarantee the commercial success of such a movie, to which they responded that he had to because it was his job and that he had already received a large paycheck. Although he disagrees with that last part, Kasahara admitted to having borrowed money from the company to build his house and thus did what he was told.

The writer flew to Hiroshima on April 2, 1973 to ask Minō and Takeshi Hattori, second president of the Kyosei-kai, the reasons for the war. He found that the two men each had opposite explanations, but because the films were based on Minō, Kasahara sided with him. Upon following the conflicts between the high ranking bosses and their complicated relationships, he had a nervous breakdown.

Kasahara flew to Kure again on May 14 to ask Minō to speak frankly. The writer said that by now the ex-yakuza realized the films were just "silly plays" and truly gave him the facts. Upon learning them, Kasahara felt the whole thing even more complex and mysterious and decided to put everything into a "human comedy" whether it made sense or not. Through this trip he met Suzuyo, the mother of Masahiro Ōnishi who was the model for Wakasugi in the first film. She told him her son could finally rest in peace thanks to the movie. The writer then created the character Kuramoto and his mother thanks to this encounter. The name Kuramoto came from fellow screenwriter Sō Kuramoto.

The assistant director, Toru Dobashi, said that a producer selected an actor to play Katsuharu Saijo. Fukasaku wanted to use Takuzo Kawatani for the role but did not want to argue with the producer. Therefore he shot the shipyard scene where the character is beat up using the producer's choice on-location, but without showing his face, while having Dobashi train Kawatani for the role in one week. Fukasaku returned with scrap iron and other background materials from the shoot and shot close-ups of Kawatani using a body double for Sugawara. Dobashi also revealed that while filming the night scene where Tsunehiko Watase's arm gets stuck in a car door and is dragged along with it, the residents of Daiei complained. On the location's last day, Watase performed the stunt himself in a single take that was filmed on a 16 mm film Eyemo to be blown up to 35 mm film later. However, it was later discovered that the Eyemo had no film in it and the scene had to be shot over after pleading with the residents.

After the second film, the anti-crime unit of the police in Hiroshima said they would not support on-location shooting. The production team for the third movie had a hard time filming in Etajima with the officials saying they "gave the wrong impression of Hiroshima by depicting violent incidents that never happened." Kasahara responded by stating that he did not write any fictional violent acts, all of them were real.

The third screenplay took 91 days to write and to the surprise of Kasahara, it was the most successful at the time. The writer said he did not understand it as the film made no sense to him and was curious what the audience saw, before suggesting that it must have been Kinji Fukasaku's direction.

== Release ==
Battles Without Honor and Humanity has been released on home video and aired on television, the latter with some scenes cut. In 1980, the first four films were edited into a 224-minute compilation and was given a limited theatrical release and broadcast on Toei's TV network. A Blu-ray box set compiling all five films in the series was released on March 21, 2013, to celebrate its 40th anniversary.

All five films in the series were released on DVD in North America by Home Vision Entertainment in 2004, under the moniker The Yakuza Papers. A 6-disc DVD box set containing them all was also released. It includes a bonus disc containing interviews with director William Friedkin, discussing the influence of the films in America; subtitle translator Linda Hoaglund, discussing her work on the films; David Kaplan, Kenta Fukasaku, Kiyoshi Kurosawa, a Toei producer and a biographer among others. Arrow Films released a Blu-ray and DVD box set, limited to 2,500 copies, of all five films in the UK on December 7, 2015, and in the US a day later. Special features include an interview with the series fight choreographer Ryuzo Ueno and the 1980 edited compilation of the first four films.

== Reception ==
Battles Without Honor and Humanity: Proxy War was the thirteenth highest-grossing film of 1973. On Kinema Junpo's annual list of the best films for the year as voted by critics, it ranked eighth.
