= Akira Kobayashi =

Japanese actor and singer

- Born: November 3, 1938 (age 87); Setagaya, Tokyo, Japan
- Occupations: Actor, singer
- Years active: 1956–present
- Height: 1.80 m (5 ft 11 in)
- Spouse: Kyōko Aoyama (m. 1967)

Akira Kobayashi (Japanese: 小林 旭, Hepburn: Kobayashi Akira; born November 3, 1938) is a Japanese actor and singer. His nickname is "Mighty Guy" (マイトガイ, Maito Gai).

== Biography ==
Kobayashi attended Meiji University but left before graduating. He became an actor at Nikkatsu and made his film debut with "Ueru Tamashii" directed by Yuzo Kawashima in 1956. He solidified his popularity with such films as Nangoku Tosa o Ato ni Shite (A Farewell to Southern Tosa) and starred in the Wataridori series and "Senpūji" ("Whirlwind Child") film series. Kobayashi, along with Yujiro Ishihara and others, formed the core of Nikkatsu Action's golden age. Kobayashi produced and starred detective tv drama series Target Men in 1971.

In 1972, he left Nikkatsu and signed with Toei film. There he starred in many yakuza films, including Battles Without Honor and Humanity series. In 1989, Kobayashi made his director debut with Haru kuru Oni.

=== Marriage ===
Kobayashi was married to popular singer Misora Hibari in 1962, but the marriage ended in divorce two years later in 1964. He remarried actress Kyōko Aoyama in 1967, and she later died in 2020.

=== Music ===
Kobayashi debuted in 1958 with the single Onna wo Wasurero. He sang some of the theme songs from his movies such "Gitā o Motta Wataridori" ("The Guitar-toting Rambler") and "Ginza Maitogai" ("Ginza's Whirlwind Child"), which became hits.

In addition to those songs, he also performed the song "Jidōsha Shō Ka" ("Auto Show Song") (which, in 2005, was featured in Asahi Breweries' "Cocktail Partner" commercial) and comical songs like "Koi no Yamanotesen" ("The Yamanote Line of Love") and a few songs of the enka variety, such as "Mukashi no Namae de Dete imasu" ("I'm Going by My Old Name"),"Tsuite kuru kai" ("Will you follow me?") and "Atsuki Kokoroni" in 1986.

== Selected filmography ==
Films

- Shori-sha (1957) - cameo
- Kawakami Tetsuharu monogatari sebangō 16 (1957)
- Sun in the Last Days of the Shogunate (1957)
- Rusty Knife (1958)
- Young Breasts (1958)
- Zesshō (1958)
- Wataridori Series
  - The Wandering Guitarist (1959)
  - Kuchibue ga Nagareru Minatomachi (1960)
  - Naked Youth -A Story of Cruelty (1960)
  - Sword and Devotion (1960)
  - The Spook Cottage (1960)
  - The Rambler under the Southern Cross (1961)
  - Ōunabara wo Yuku Wataridori (1961)
  - Kitakikōyori Wataridori Kitae Kaeru (1962)
- Kanto Wanderer (1963)
- Our Blood Will Not Forgive (1964)
- The Flower and the Angry Waves (1964)
- Black Tight Killers (1966)
- 3 Seconds Before Explosion (1967)
- Retaliation (1968)
- Zoro Me no San Kyōdai (1972)
- Battles Without Honor and Humanity: Proxy War (1973)
- Battles Without Honor and Humanity: Police Tactics (1974)
- Violent Streets (1974)
- The Gate of Youth (1975)
- Battles Without Honor and Humanity: Final Episode (1974)
- Bannai Tarao (1978)
- Conquest (1982)
- Haru Kuru Oni (1989) - directed
- Shura no Densetsu (1992)
- Don e no Michi (2003)

Television

- Target Men (1971)
- Tabigarasu Jiken Cho (1980)
- Gennosuke Yonaishicho (1981)
- Ryūkyū no Kaze (1993)
- Netafurishiteiru Otokotachi (1995)

== Golf ==
He is a professional golf player. He belongs to the International Sports Promotion Society.
