= Nobuo Kaneko =

Japanese actor (1923–1995)

- Born: 27 March 1923; Taito-ku, Tokyo, Japan
- Died: 20 January 1995 (aged 71); Chiyoda-ku, Tokyo, Japan
- Occupation: Actor
- Years active: 1946–1995

Nobuo Kaneko (金子信雄, Kaneko Nobuo; 27 March 1923 – 20 January 1995) was a Japanese actor. His wife was actress Yatsuko Tanami. He appeared in more than 200 films between 1946 and 1993.

== Career ==
Kaneko was a versatile character actor, playing roles ranging from comedic buffoons to hardened yakuza bosses. He is especially known for his role as Yoshio Yamamori in the Battles Without Honor and Humanity series.

Kaneko started his acting career at the Bungakuza theater troupe in 1946. His film debut was in the 1946 film Urashimano Kōei. In 1952, he appeared in the Akira Kurosawa film Ikiru. He signed his contract with Nikkatsu film company in 1955 and he often played villains in action films.

He was the host of a cooking program Kaneko Nobuo no Tanoshi Yushoku from 1987 to 1995 on TV Asahi.

== Selected filmography ==
=== Film ===
- Urashimano Kōei (1946)
- Ikiru (1952) - Mitsuo Watanabe
- The Garden of Women (1954) - Kihei Hirato
- Sound of the Mountain (1954)
- Floating Clouds (1955)
- A Hole of My Own Making (1955)
- Ryūri no Kishi (1956)
- Gesshoku (1956)
- Sun in the Last Days of the Shogunate (1957) - Sagamiya
- Man Who Causes a Storm (1957)
- This Day's Life (1957)
- Night Drum (1958)
- Voice Without a Shadow (1958)
- The Wandering Guitarist (1959)
- Intimidation (1960)
- Youth of the Beast (1963)
- Detective Bureau 23: Go to Hell, Bastards! (1963)
- Red Handkerchief (1964) - Detective Tsuchiya
- Fight, Zatoichi, Fight (1964) - Unosuke
- Kiri no Hata (1965) - Tanimura
- The Magic Serpent (1966)
- Tokyo Drifter 2: The Sea is Bright Red as the Color of Love (1966) - Segawa
- Portrait of Chieko (1967) - Yamazaki
- Goke, Body Snatcher from Hell (1968) - Tokuyasu
- Curse of the Blood (1968) - Dr.Yasukawa Sōjun
- The Valiant Red Peony (1968)
- The Living Skeleton (1968) - Sueji
- Daikanbu Nagurikomi (1969)
- Terrifying Girls' High School: Lynch Law Classroom (1973)
- Battles Without Honor and Humanity (1973) - Yoshio Yamamori
- Battles Without Honor and Humanity: Deadly Fight in Hiroshima (1973) - Yoshio Yamamori
- Battles Without Honor and Humanity: Proxy War (1973) - Yoshio Yamamori
- Battles Without Honor and Humanity: Police Tactics (1974) - Yoshio Yamamori
- Battles Without Honor and Humanity: Final Episode (1974) - Yoshio Yamamori
- New Battles Without Honor and Humanity (1974) - Yoshio Yamamori
- Cops vs. Thugs (1975) - Tomoyasu
- Yakuza Graveyard (1976) - Akama
- Shin Joshū Sasori: 701-gō (1976) - Osamu Sasaki
- Shogun's Samurai (1978) - Kujō Michifusa
- The Fall of Ako Castle (1978) - Kira Yoshinaka
- Never Give up (1978)
- Aftermath of Battles Without Honor and Humanity (1979) - Hirokichi Asakura
- Sanada Yukimura no Bōryaku (1979) - Hayashi Razan
- Hattori Hanzō Kageno Gundan (1980) - Tokugawa Mitsukuni
- Shōgun (1980) - Ishido Kazunari
- Imperial Navy (1981), Chūichi Nagumo
- The Return of Godzilla (1984) - Minister of Home Affairs Isomura
- 226 (1989) - Yoshiyuki Kawashima
- Ōte (1991)
- Edo Jō Tairan (1991), Tokugawa Mitsutomo
- Kokkaie Ikō (1993) - Tokuro Morishita

=== Television ===
- Shinsho Taikōki (1973) - Ankokuji Ekei
- Tokyo Megure Keishi (1978)
- Shiroi Kyotō (1978–1979) - Jūkichi Iwata
- Kusa Moeru (1979) - Taira no Kiyomori
- Fumō Chitai (1979) - Kaizuka
- Shōgun (1980 miniseries) - Lord Ishido Kazunari (probably based on Ishida Mitsunari)
- Hattori Hanzō: Kage no Gundan (1980) - Sakai Tadakiyo
- Dokuganryū Masamune (1987) - Date Harumune
- Tobuga Gotoku (1990) - Tokugawa Nariaki
