= The Fall of Ako Castle =

- Theatrical release poster
- Directed by: Kinji Fukasaku
- Written by: Koji Takada
- Starring: Yorozuya Kinnosuke; Sonny Chiba; Hiroki Matsukata; Teruhiko Saigō; Tsunehiko Watase; Tetsuro Tamba; Yoshiko Mita; Mariko Okada; Toshirō Mifune
- Cinematography: Yoshio Miyajima
- Music by: Toshiaki Tsushima
- Distributed by: Toei Company
- Release date: October 28, 1978 (Japan)
- Running time: 158 minutes
- Country: Japan
- Language: Japanese

The Fall of Ako Castle (Japanese: 赤穂城断絶, Hepburn: Akō-jō danzetsu) is a 1978 Japanese historical martial arts period film directed by Kinji Fukasaku. It depicts the story of the forty-seven Ronin (Chūshingura). The film is one of a series of period films by Fukasaku starring Yorozuya Kinnosuke, including Shogun's Samurai. The film received one nomination for the Award of the Japanese Academy for best cinematography.

== Plot ==
Lord Tsunayoshi of the Tokugawa shogunate strips 48 samurai of their assets, but they are afraid to resist and nevertheless attend a ceremony where he is presented with the Imperial Sword. Enraged by insults from the court official Kira, Asano draws his sword but is prevented from killing him. Asano is sentenced to seppuku, his land and property are seized by the shogunate, and the Asano name is abolished. Several disciples of Asano, upset about the one-sided verdict, vow to return to Edo to take vengeance on Kira. They wait a year for an opportune time to make their move.

Kira retires and Tsunayoshi's follower Lord Yanagisawa sends Kira to Yonezawa. Hashimoto and Horibe of the Asano clan hastily choose to ambush him en route against orders but are stopped by spies and other members of their clan and Hashimoto is injured. Yanagisawa dispatches three criminals to kill Oishi, the only perceived threat. Oishi divorces his wife and sends her and their younger children to her father's home but keeps his eldest son and heir Chikara with him. The three attackers enter Oishi's house and attack but the ronin Fuwa, who is living in the woods near his former master Oishi's home, intervenes and kills them, saving Oishi and Chikara.

Lord Kira's attendant Kobayashi Heihachiro attempts to slay Oishi but kills a different man who happens to be sleeping in his room. Kobayashi visits Hashimoto, who is unable to work due to his leg injury, forcing his wife into prostitution. Kobayashi offers him 50 ryo to reveal the location of Oishi. Hashimoto refuses and attacks with his sword but is overpowered. Kobayashi leaves the money and says that he already knows that Oishi is in Edo.

When Kira goes to the Uesugi mansion in Sakurada, Oishi tells the clan that the raid will take place the following night. Jujiro delivers the message to Hashimoto, who is now unable to fight and angrily draws his sword on his fellow clan member delivering the message. His wife stabs him in an attempt to stop him and he kills her as well, proclaiming that it is Oishi's fault for waiting too long, then he kills himself. Jujiro brings their infant daughter to Oishi.

The Ako warriors descend on an inn where Kira is sleeping following a tea ceremony. Fuwa defeats Kobayashi after a long battle, then they search the house for those who are hiding. Kira is found and they blow a whistle to summon Oishi, who kills him. Asano's wife is told of their success and she is overcome with regret that 47 ronin have now sacrificed themselves for one man. Yanagisawa views their act as an attack on the infallibility of the shogunate and sentences them all to seppuku but the shogunate also abolishes the name Kira.

== Cast ==
- Yorozuya Kinnosuke as Ōishi Kuranosuke
- Sonny Chiba as Fuwa Kazuemon
- Tsunehiko Watase as Kobayashi Heihachiro
- Masaomi Kondo as Hashimoto Heizaemon
- Toshiro Mifune as Tsuchiya Michinao
- Kyōko Enami as Ukibashi
- Mitsuteru Nakamura as Date Muratoyo
- Shinsuke Mikimoto as Tsuchiya Masanao
- Teruhiko Saigō as Asano Takumi no Kami
- Nobuo Kaneko as Kira Kōzukenosuke
- Hiroki Matsukata as Denhachiro Tamon
- Yoshiko Mita as Yozeiin
- Mariko Okada as Ōishi Riku
- Sanae Nakahara as Todano Tsubone
- Ken Nishida as Asano Daigaku
- Junkichi Orimoto as Izeki Tokubei
- Kyoko Enami as Ukihashi
- Jun Fujimaki as Okajima
- Runtarō Mine as Hayami Toemon
- Toru Minegishi as Horibe Yasubei
- Minori Terada as Otaka Gengo
- Ryosuke Kagawa as Uchikawa Magozaemon
- Naruse Masashi as Okano Kingoemon
- Yoshirō Aoki as Ueda Mondo
- Tatsuo Endō as Yoshida Chuzaemon
- Mieko Harada as Hatsune Hatsu
- Kensaku Morita as Hazama Jujirō
- Ryo Tamura as Uesugi Noritsuna
- Hiroshi Miyauchi as Kayano Sanppie
- Seizo Fukumoto as Spy
- Takuya Fujioka as Ōno Kurobei
- Go Wakabayashi as Araki
- Hideji Otaki
- Mikio Narita as Katō Etchu
- Tetsurō Tamba as Yanagisawa

== Reception ==
Reviewer Dr Lenera of horrorcultfilms.co.uk gave the film a rating of 8 out of 10 stars, writing, "The Fall Of Ako Castle simplifies the actual events a bit for clarity and occasionally stumbles in doing so, while the bits of narration are rather pointless because we can deduce what’s going on anyway. Nonetheless, never boring even in its most methodical passages, The Fall Of Ako Castle is a cracking samurai drama that’s also at times surprisingly moving."

== See also ==
- Forty-seven Ronin
