= Asao Koike =

Japanese actor (1931–1985)

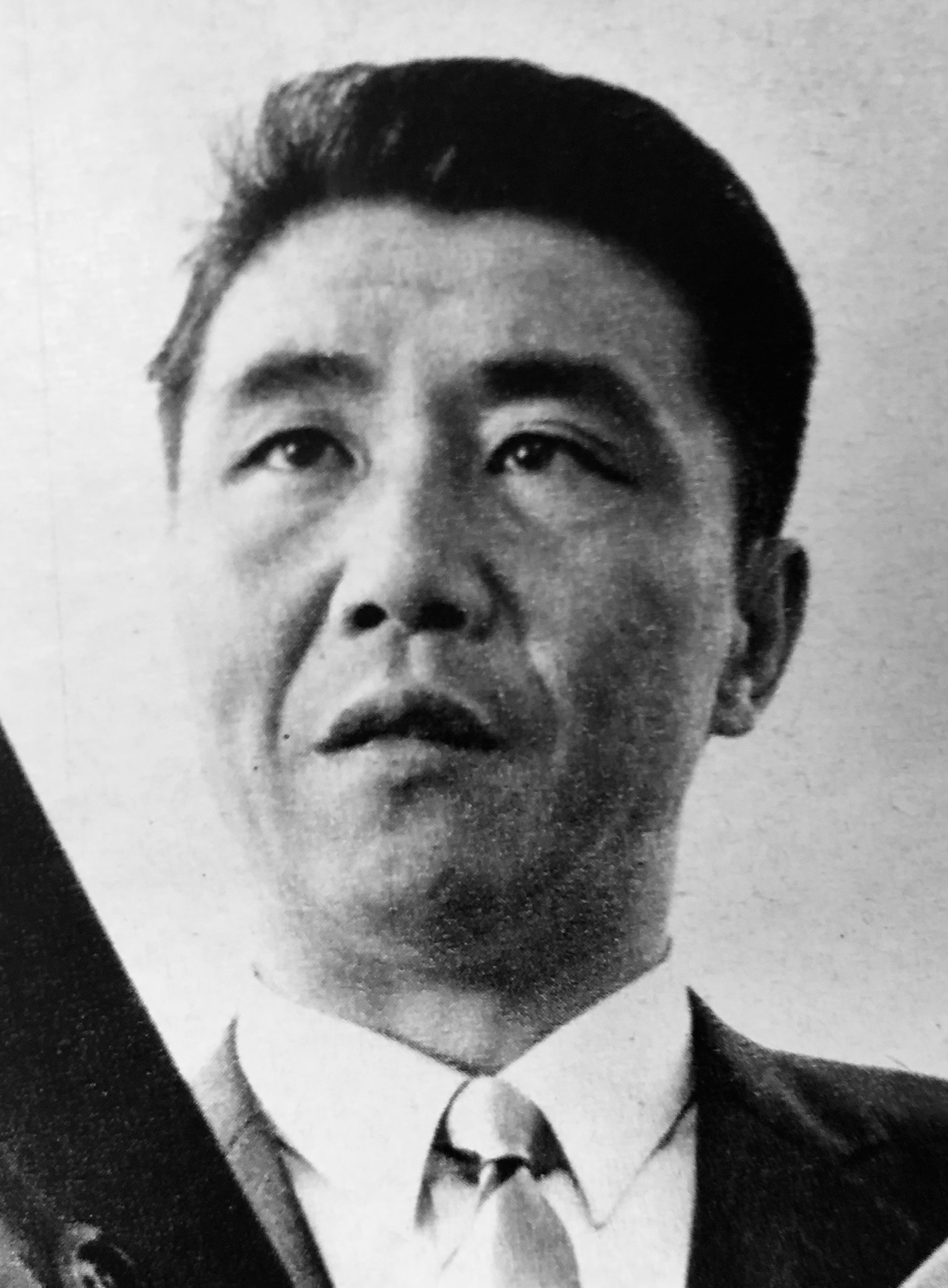
- Born: 18 March 1931; Tokyo, Japan
- Died: 23 March 1985 (aged 54)
- Occupation: Actor
- Years active: 1949–1985

Asao Koike (小池朝雄, Koike Asao; 18 March 1931 – 23 March 1985) was a Japanese character actor best known for his roles in Yakuza movies. In 1950, he joined the Bungakuza Theatre Company. In 1963, he left the Bungakuza Theatre Company and established the Kumo Theatre Company. He appeared in more than 120 films.

== Filmography ==
=== Films ===
- Throne of Blood (1957) - Tsuzuki soldier
- Nusumareta yokujô (1958)
- Anyakôro (1959) - Mizutani
- Kenju no okite (1960)
- Kuroi gashû: Aru sarariman no shôgen (1960)
- Taiyô no hakaba (1960) - Black Glasses
- Banana (1960)
- Happiness of Us Alone (1961)
- Minami no kaze to nami (1961) - Mineo Koike
- Wakarete ikiru toki mo (1961)
- Netsuai sha (1961) - Tomonari
- Akitsu Springs (1962) - Osaki
- Ao beka monogatari (1962)
- Nikui an-chikushô (1962) - Toshio Kosaka
- Namida o shishi no tategami ni (1962) - Gen, the big man
- Hitoribotchi no futari daga (1962) - Utsumi
- Kiri no yoru no otoko (1962)
- Dorodarake no junjô (1963) - Hanai
- Bad Girl (1963)
- Yogiri no burûsu (1963)
- Tantei jimusho 2 3 - zeni to onna ni yowai otoko (1963)
- Otoko no monshô (1963)
- Shin meoto zenzai (1963) - Shinichi
- Zoku otoko no monshô (1963)
- The Insect Woman (1963) - Sawakichi
- Kyojin Ôkuma Shigenobu (1963) - Kiyotaka Kuroda
- Akai ka to roku denashi (1963)
- Suna no ue no shokubutsu-gun (1964) - Imura
- Ryojin nikki (1964) - Narrator
- Otoko no monshô - kanka jô (1964)
- Surai no gyanburaa (1964)
- Sâtsujin sha o kêse (1964)
- Otoko no monshô - fuun futatsu ryu (1964)
- Otoko no monsho: hana to nagadosu (1964)
- Suruga yûkyôden: Dokyô garasu (1965)
- Hana saku otome tachi (1965) - Kawamoto
- Kuroi tobakushi (1965)
- Gyangu chôjô sakusen (1965) - Tajima
- Otoko no monshô ore wa kiru (1965)
- Kenju mushuku-datsy goku no buruusu (1965)
- Otoko no monshô: Ryûko mujô (1966)
- Zenigata Heiji (1966)
- A Certain Killer (1967)
- Kyôkaku-dô (1967)
- Akumyō Ichidai (1967)
- Shayô no omokage (1967) - Journalist
- Tôkyô shigai sen (1967)
- Zatoichi Challenged (1967) - Maebara of Gonzo
- Zankyo no sakazuki (1967)
- Shichinin no yajû: chi no sengen (1967)
- Nihon ânkokushi: chî no koso (1967)
- Dorifutazu desu yo! Zenshin zenshin matazenshin (1967)
- Choueki juhachi-nen (1967)
- Bakuchi uchi (1967)
- Âa dôki no sakura (1967) - First Lieutenant Ôoka
- Ah kaiten tokubetsu kogetikai (1968)
- Hitori okami (1968)
- Shogun's Joys of Torture (1968) - Makino Bingo-no-kami
- Teppô denraiki (1968) - Matasaburo Tachibanaya
- Tokugawa onna keibatsu-shi (1968) - Horichô
- Outlaw: Goro the Assassin (1968) - Kensaku Kaidô
- Kyûketsu dokuro-sen (1968) - Tsuji (Estate Agent)
- Zankyo mujo (1968) - Hamaoka
- Otoko no okite (1968)
- Lady Sazen and the Drenched Swallow Sword (1968, TV Movie)
- Nippon ankokushi: nasake muyô (1968)
- Kanto onna yakuza (1968)
- Zankoku ijô gyakutai monogatari: Genroku onna keizu (1969)
- Nemuri Kyôshirô: Akujo-gari (1969)
- Carta de uma flor (1969)
- Ijô seiai kiroku: Harenchi (1969) - Terauchi
- The Wonderful World of Puss 'n Boots (1969) - Lucifer (voice)
- Tokugawa irezumi-shi: Seme jigoku (1969) - Horitatsu
- Nuretsubame katageri (1969)
- A Thousand and One Nights (1969) - Kamahakim (voice)
- Nihon ansatsu hiroku (1969)
- Horrors of Malformed Men (1969) - Hirukawa
- Gonin no Shôkin Kasegi (1969) - Lord Ozeki
- Tosei-nin Retsuden (1969)
- Showa onna jingi (1969)
- Kanto onna do konjo (1969)
- Gokuaku bozu hitokiri kazoe uta (1970)
- Maruhi joshidai-ryô (1970)
- Shiruku hatto no ô-oyabun: chobi-hige no kuma (1970)
- Shiruku hatto no ô-oyabun (1970)
- Sengo hiwa, hoseki ryakudatsu (1970)
- Sanbiki no mesubachi (1970)
- Onsen konnyaku geisha (1970)
- Hana fudâ tibakû: Ino shî ka sânban shobû (1970)
- Sympathy for the Underdog (1971)
- Zubeko banchô: Hamagure kazoe uta (1971) - Nakao
- Animal Treasure Island (1971) - Silver (voice)
- Gendai yakuza: Chizakura san kyodai (1971)
- Gendai poruno-den: Sentensei inpu (1971) - Kiyoshi Ôba
- Gendai yakuza: Sakazuki kaeshimasu (1971)
- Boryokudan sai buso (1971)
- Bakuto kirikomi-tai (1971) - Suzaki
- Mesubachi no chosen (1972) - Masayoshi Kurochi, Yakuza Boss
- Mamushi no kyôdai: Chôeki jûsankai (1972)
- Street Mobster (1972)
- Shin Zatôichi monogatari: Oreta tsue (1972) - Boss Mangoro Kagiya
- Hijirimen bakuto (1972)
- Lone Wolf and Cub: Baby Cart in Peril (1972) - Tokugawa Yoshinao
- Nihon Aku Nin Den: Jigoku No Michizure (1972)
- Kogarashi Monjirô (1972)
- Furyo gai (1972)
- Battles Without Honor and Humanity (1973) - Narrator
- Teppôdama no bigaku (1973)
- Kôkôsei burai hikae: Tsuki no Muramasa (1973) - Buchô Keiji
- Battles Without Honor and Humanity: Deadly Fight in Hiroshima (1973) - Takanashi Kunimatsu
- Hissatsu Shikakenin Baian Arijigoku (1973) - Sôhaku Yamazaki
- Gendai ninkyô-shi (1973) - Sekiguchi
- Battles Without Honor and Humanity: Police Tactics (1974)
- Goyôkiba: Oni no Hanzô yawahada koban (1974) - Ishiyama
- Violent Streets (1974) - Moroki
- Dai dâtsu gokû (1975)
- Daidatsugoku (1975) - Sagawa
- Afurika no hikari (1975) - Tokumatsu
- Dômyaku rettô (1975) - Yamazaki
- Shôrinji kenpô (1975) - Sakae Akamatsu
- Tekiya no Ishimatsu (1976)
- Kigeki Daiyûkai (1976) - Daisaku
- Utareru mae-ni ute! (1976) - Kinugasa, a reporter
- Andô Noboru no waga tôbô to sex no kiroku (1976) - Yuji Tadokoro
- Yakuza senso: Nihon no Don (1977) - Katsunosuke Miura
- Yakyukyô no uta (1977) - Tetsugorô Iwata
- Jingi to kôsô (1977) - Yoshimatsu Sasamoto
- Nippon no Don: Yabohen (1977) - Akimasa Onizawa
- A Tale of Sorrow and Sadness (1977)
- Inubue (1978) - Police Inspector Kamizuki
- Fuyu no hana (1978)
- Nihon no Don: Kanketsuhen (1978) - Fujii
- Hakatakko junjô (1978) - Goro, Rokuhei's dad
- Yokohama ankokugai mashingan no ryu (1978)
- Sochô no kubi (1979) - Kazuaki Yashiro
- Aftermath of Battles Without Honor and Humanity (1979) - Hidenobu Fujioka
- The Resurrection of the Golden Wolf (1979) - Kaneko
- G.I. Samurai (1979) - Koizumi Yukinaga
- Nichiren (1979) - Tōjō Kagenobu
- Dôran (1980) - Misumi
- Harukanaru sôro (1980) - Iwataro Okabe
- Shogun's Ninja (1980) - Toyotomi Hideyoshi
- Swan Lake (1981) - Rothbart (voice)
- Nihon Philharmonic Orchestra: Honoo no dai gogakusho (1981)
- Rennyo to sono haha (1981) - Narrator (voice)
- Conquest (1982) - Toru Shimoda
- Antarctica (1983) - Narrator (voice)
- The Geisha (1983)
- Nogare no machi (1983) - Katsuichi Suzuki
- Fireflies in the North (1984) - Yuhara
- Shura no mure (1984) - Narration (final film role)

=== Television drama ===
- Taikōki (1965) - Araki Murashige
- Shinsho Taikōki (1973) - Shibata Katsuie
- Kaze to Kumo to Niji to (1976) - Ono no Michikaze
- Daitokai Part II (1977)
- Message from Space: Galactic Wars (1978-1979) - Narrator
- The Yagyu Conspiracy (1979) - Negoro Sagenta
- Ōoku (1983) - Ii Naosuke

=== Dubbing ===
- Columbo (Lt. Columbo (Peter Falk))
- Superman (Lex Luthor (Gene Hackman))
