= Toshiaki Tsushima =

Japanese composer (1936–2013)

Toshiaki Tsushima (津島 利章, Tsushima Toshiaki; 22 May 1936 – 25 November 2013) was a Japanese composer, mainly known for his film scores. Born in Okayama Prefecture, he graduated from the Arts Department of Nihon University in Tokyo. He died on November 25, 2013, of pneumonia.

== Filmography (selection) ==
- Three Outlaw Samurai (1964)
- The Magic Serpent (1966)
- The Green Slime (1968)
- Wandering Ginza Butterfly (1972)
- Street Mobster (1972)
- Girl Boss Guerilla (1972)
- Wandering Ginza Butterfly 2: She-Cat Gambler (1972)
- Bodyguard Kiba (1973)
- Bodigaado Kiba: Hissatsu sankaku tobi (1973)
- Battles Without Honor and Humanity (1973)
- Battles Without Honor and Humanity: Hiroshima Deathmatch (1973)
- Battles Without Honor and Humanity: Proxy War (1973)
- Battles Without Honor and Humanity: Police Tactics (1974)
- The Street Fighter (1974)
- Battles Without Honor and Humanity: Final Episode (1974)
- New Battles Without Honor and Humanity (1974)
- Graveyard of Honor (1975)
- New Battles Without Honor and Humanity: The Boss's Head (1975)
- New Battles Without Honor and Humanity: Last Days of the Boss (1976)
- Hokuriku Proxy War (1977)
- The War in Space (1977)
- Shogun's Samurai (1978)
- Bandits vs. Samurai Squadron (1978)
- The Fall of Ako Castle (1978)
- Tobu yume o shibaraku minai (1990)
- Number Ten Blues (2013)

== TV dramas ==
- Saru No Gundan (1974)
- Pro-Wres no Hoshi Aztecaser (1976)
- Dinosaur War Izenborg (1977)
- Hana no Asuka-gumi! (1988)
