= Battles Without Honor and Humanity =

Japanese yakuza film series

- Screenshot from the first installment of the series, featuring the title against the atomic bombing of Hiroshima.

Films and television
- Film(s): Battles Without Honor and Humanity (1973); Battles Without Honor and Humanity: Deadly Fight in Hiroshima (1973); Battles Without Honor and Humanity: Proxy War (1973); Battles Without Honor and Humanity: Police Tactics (1974); Battles Without Honor and Humanity: Final Episode (1974); New Battles Without Honor and Humanity (1974); New Battles Without Honor and Humanity: The Boss's Head (1975); New Battles Without Honor and Humanity: Last Days of the Boss (1976); Aftermath of Battles Without Honor and Humanity (1979); New Battles Without Honor and Humanity (2000); New Battles Without Honor and Humanity/Murder (2003)

Audio
- Original music: "Battle Without Honor or Humanity"

Battles Without Honor and Humanity (Japanese: 仁義なき戦い, Hepburn: Jingi Naki Tatakai), also known in the West as The Yakuza Papers, is a Japanese yakuza film series produced by Toei Company. Inspired by a series of magazine articles by journalist Kōichi Iiboshi that are based on memoirs originally written by real-life yakuza Kōzō Minō, the films detail yakuza conflicts in Hiroshima Prefecture.

Five films directed by Kinji Fukasaku and starring Bunta Sugawara as Shozo Hirono (a character based on Minō) were produced between 1973 and 1974. They were critically and commercially successful and popularized the subgenre of yakuza film called jitsuroku eiga, which are often based on true stories. Fukasaku directed an additional three standalone films under the New Battles Without Honor and Humanity title between 1974 and 1976. Three more films by different directors were produced in 1979, 2000 and 2003.

== Sources ==
The Jingi Naki Tatakai series of articles written by Kōichi Iiboshi that began in Weekly Sankei (週刊サンケイ, Shūkan Sankei) magazine in 1972, are rewrites of a manuscript originally written by Kōzō Minō while he was in prison. Minō led his own yakuza family associated with the Yamamura-gumi before being arrested in 1963. While incarcerated in Abashiri Prison he wrote his memoir and upon being released in 1970, retired from the yakuza life.

Minō's memoir tells the story of what is commonly called the Hiroshima Strife (Hiroshima Kōsō) which took place between 1950 and 1972. Several yakuza groups were involved, the most well-known being the Yamaguchi-gumi and Kyosei-kai. In the films, the real-life yakuza group Yamamura-gumi became the Yamamori family, the Minō-gumi became the Hirono family, the Tsuchioka-gumi became the Doi family, the Yamaguchi-gumi became the Akashi family, the Honda-kai became the Shinwa Group, and the Kyosei-kai became the Tensei Coalition.

== Screenplays ==
Kazuo Kasahara, screenwriter of the first four films, told Toei he could work with the incidents in Kure, but not the events that followed in Hiroshima City due to how complicated they were; the studio agreed. He developed the original film around the story of yakuza underboss Tetsuhiko Sasaki, who rebelled against future Kyosei-kai leader Tatsuo Yamamura and was killed. Sasaki became the character Tetsuya Sakai.

Because Kasahara did not know the whole story yet – as Iiboshi's articles were still being published – and as he did not want to make another ensemble piece like the first installment, the second film (Deadly Fight in Hiroshima) features the dramatic story of hitman Mitsuji Yamagami, who in the film became the character Shoji Yamanaka.

After the first film's success, Toei demanded that Kasahara finally write about the Hiroshima war and split it into two films, which he did, under the titles Proxy War and Police Tactics. Kasahara purposely avoided this part of the story in the first two films – not only because he was daunted by the numerous, complex names and relationships, but also because it would involve writing about the Yamaguchi-gumi; he was concerned about agreements he made to various people involved in the conflicts. On a visit to Kure, Kasahara met the mother of Masahiro Ōnishi, the basis for the character of Hiroshi Wakasugi in the first film. She told him her son could finally rest in peace thanks to the movie. After this encounter, Kasahara then created the characters of Takeshi Kuramoto and his mother, who appeared in Proxy War.

Final Episode is the only film in the pentalogy not written by Kasahara; instead, the screenplay was written by Koji Takada. Kasahara was supportive of Takada, giving him all research materials he had created for the first four films. However, he said there was not enough material for a fifth film, and Takada admitted the research was not very useful for his story, due to the fact that the characters had to become a "respectable" organization throughout Western Japan by the end. Kasahara suggested to not use the character played by Kin'ya Kitaōji as he was based on a real yakuza boss that Takada met in Hiroshima (Kyosei-kai leader Hisashi Yamada), but Takada disregarded the advice. Takada later said that the real-life yakuza group later saw the film and caused problems with the studio.

== Actors ==
Fukasaku biographer and film expert Sadao Yamane and Kenta Fukasaku both agreed that the series does not focus on specific lead actors, but is an ensemble piece with the supporting actors energizing it. The stars are narrative characters, with the low-ranking yakuza that are endlessly killed off being the real focus of the movies.

Kazuo Kasahara claimed he envisioned Bunta Sugawara portraying the character Tetsuya Sakai while writing and later learned that Sugawara had already been cast in the role. He said that the day before shooting, however, Sugawara was instead cast as Shozo Hirono (based on Minō) and Hiroki Matsukata took over as Sakai. Nobuo Kaneko is the only other actor to portray the same character across all five films; playing Yoshio Yamamori based on Tatsuo Yamamura, who became the first leader of the Kyosei-kai.

A group of bit actors and drinking buddies dubbed the Piranha Army (ja:ピラニア軍団, Piranha Gundan) portrayed many different small and physical roles throughout the series. Takuzo Kawatani and Hideo Murota being the most prominent members. Kawatani, Masaru Shiga and non-Piranha Army member Seizō Fukumoto competed to see who could have the most over the top death scenes. In group scenes, they would hide in the back during rehearsals, only to move to the front during the actual take. Shiga said that Fukasaku was the only director they treated as equals.

Upon filming on-location in Kure, many yakuza, including those used as models for characters in the film, gathered on set. They gave advice to both the director and actors; decades later, Tatsuo Umemiya stated that he felt sorry for actors playing yakuza today because they "don't have the chance to get to know real yakuza the way we did." Producer Koji Shundo himself was formerly a yakuza before getting a job at Toei.

== Filming ==
Set in post-war Japan, Fukasaku drew on his experiences as a child during World War II for Battles Without Honor and Humanity. At fifteen he worked with other children in a munitions factory that was regularly bombed. The director recalled "even though we were friends working together, the only thing we would be thinking of was self-preservation. We would try to get behind each other or beneath dead bodies to avoid the bombs.... I also had to clean up all the dead bodies.... I'm sure those experiences have influenced the way I look at violence." Using hand-held camera, zoom lenses and natural lighting to create a "gritty, chaotic look," the director showed his generation's struggle to survive in the post-war chaos. The shaky camera technique has since become a trademark of the director.

Toei producer Masao Sato remarked that unusually Fukasaku shot the films in Toei's Kyoto studio, despite being under contract to Toei Tokyo. He also stated that the entire filming process for the first movie was short, hectic and chaotic, taking only 35 to 40 days. Actor Takashi Noguchi said that although Fukasaku would be given a one-month deadline, he always went over it, taking 50 or 60 days. There were also a lot of night shoots, with any work after 10pm earning the Toei crew significant overtime pay. The assistant director on Proxy War and Police Tactics, Toru Dobashi, claimed that Fukasaku was not as sharp in the mornings, napping while the crew prepped, usually only filming the first take in the afternoon. He said that the director's peak work hours were between 2 and 3am. Dobashi remarked that Fukasaku was very hands-on, taking part in location scouting and costume selection. While he let the actors choose their costumes, he needed to know the reason why and would have lengthy discussions with them on how it helped their character's development.

The series' action director Ryuzo Ueno said that for on-location shooting, he suggested to Fukasaku that they rehearse in studio beforehand. This way the citizens seen on film are giving realistic reactions to the street fights. After the second film, the anti-crime unit of the police in Hiroshima said they would not support on-location shooting. The production team for the third movie had a hard time filming in Etajima with the officials saying they "gave the wrong impression of Hiroshima by depicting violent incidents that never happened." Kasahara responded by stating that he did not write any fictional violent acts, all of them were real.

Ueno recalled that Kawatani almost died filming a scene in the second film where he is pulled behind a boat with his hands tied together. The actor went against Ueno's advice and insisted his hands actually be tied. After almost drowning, he did it Ueno's way. Shiga claimed that Sugawara was not as skilled as the Piranha Army in staged fights and would accidentally hit them for real. Dobashi described an incident filming a night scene in Proxy War, where Tsunehiko Watase performed a dangerous stunt himself in a single take that was filmed on a 16 mm film Eyemo to be blown up to 35 mm film later. However, it was later discovered that the Eyemo had no film in it and the scene had to be shot over after pleading with the location's residents.

== Reception and legacy ==
Battles Without Honor and Humanity was a box office success and made Sugawara a star and Fukasaku an A-list director. The first installment earned its distributor $4.5 million at the box office, (Note: Mark Schilling notes that this is the distributor's share of the film's theatrical revenue, roughly half of its total earnings.) making it the eleventh highest-grossing film of the year. The second and third films ranked twelfth and thirteenth for the same year, respectively, while the last two both ranked in the top ten of 1974.

On Kinema Junpo's annual list of the best films for the year of 1973 as voted by critics, the first film placed second, Proxy War placed eighth and Deadly Fight in Hiroshima thirteenth. At the 1974 Kinema Junpo Awards; the first installment won the Reader's Choice for Best Film (Deadly Fight in Hiroshima was fourth), Bunta Sugawara received Best Actor, and Kazuo Kasahara received Best Screenplay. In 2009, the magazine named it fifth on an aggregated list of the Top 10 Japanese Films of All Time as voted by over one hundred film critics and writers. Previous editions of the list had the series at number twenty-two in 1995 and eighth in 1999, tied with Twenty-Four Eyes. In 2011, Complex named it number one on their list of The 25 Best Yakuza Movies.

Yamane believes Battles Without Honor and Humanity was popular because of the time of its release; Japan's economic growth was at its peak and at the end of the 1960s the student uprisings took place. The young people had similar feelings to those of the post-war society depicted in the films. The Fukasaku biographer and film expert also stated that for the rest of his career Fukasaku was approached many times by producers to create movies similar to Battles, but always turned them down wanting to move on to films he found interesting. Mark Schilling wrote that many Japanese commentators cite the films' extensive use of the Hiroshima dialect as fresh, because it was not heard in many mainstream films at the time.

The success of the Battles Without Honor and Humanity series popularized the subgenre of yakuza film called Jitsuroku eiga or "actual record films", often depicting events based on true stories. Prior, movies about yakuza were known as ninkyō eiga or "chivalry films" and set in pre-war Japan. The A.V. Club's Noel Murray states that Fukasaku's yakuza instead only "adhere to codes of honor when it's in their best interest, but otherwise bully and kill indiscriminately." Dennis Lim of The Village Voice writes "Fukasaku's yakuza flicks drain criminal netherworlds of romance, crush codes of honor underfoot, and nullify distinctions between good and evil."

DVD Talk's Glenn Erickson called Battles Without Honor and Humanity a "violent saga awash in blood, betrayal, treachery and aggression". Describing the first two films as following Hirono as he forms ties with doomed friends who try to live up to the yakuza code, giving viewers something to care about in "what would otherwise be a completely nihilistic series of rotten deals and betrayals", Erickson wrote that by the third film Fukasaku and his writers veer into political territory; he interpreted the yakuza captains using their underlings as proxies in their fights as an allegory for what America and the Soviet Union did in the Cold War. Kyle Anderson of the Nerdist referred to the series as "the fastest, most frenetic, least apologetic gangster pictures ever made." He noted how the onscreen text giving the victim's name and date of death after each murder, coupled with the handheld photography, give the films a "newsreel style that draws the viewer in."

== Sequels ==
Toei convinced Fukasaku to create three more films between 1974 and 1976 under the names New Battles Without Honor and Humanity, New Battles Without Honor and Humanity: The Boss's Head and New Battles Without Honor and Humanity: Last Days of the Boss. These standalone films feature many of the same actors, but all playing new characters. This series was followed in 1979 with Aftermath of Battles Without Honor and Humanity, directed by Eiichi Kudo, which features all new actors aside from Matsukata.

In 2000, a film directed by Junji Sakamoto was released under the title New Battles Without Honor and Humanity, also known as Another Battle, but with no direct similarities to Fukasaku's series. A sequel to this film, titled New Battles Without Honor and Humanity/Murder (新・仁義なき戦い／謀殺, Shin Jingi Naki Tatakai/Bōsatsu) or Another Battle/Conspiracy, directed by Hajime Hashimoto, followed in 2003, with a soundtrack by Tokyo Ska Paradise Orchestra & Sembello.

== Stage adaptations ==
A theatrical play adaptation of Battles Without Honor and Humanity ran at Shinjuku's Kinokuniya Hall from October 24 to November 2, 1974. Nobuo Kaneko's friend Yoshiyuki Fukuda was a fan of the films and asked the actor if he would perform in a stage adaptation, to which Kaneko agreed. Based on the first two parts of the original film, Kaneko produced the play with the Mārui Theatre Company, which he presided over, while Fukuda and Kinji Fukasaku co-directed. It marked Fukasaku's debut in theater. Kaneko reprised his role of Yoshio Yamamori, Hideo Murota took over as Shozo Hirono, Toru Minegishi played Tetsuya Sakai, and Harumi Sone played Uichi Shinkai. Other actors from the Battles Without Honor and Humanity film series who also appeared in the play include Shingo Yamashiro, Reiko Ike, Mikio Narita, and Sanae Nakahara. The play was a commercial failure, incurring a deficit of ¥2 million.

In 2019, female pop idol group AKB48 performed Battles Without Honor and Humanity: On'na-tachi no Shitō-hen (仁義なき戦い〜彼女（おんな）たちの死闘篇〜) at Hakata-za in Fukuoka from November 9–24. It was written by Daisuke Kamijyo, and directed by Shutaro Oku. There were two different cast lineups; the first performed the play from opening day until November 14, while the second took over on November 16 and continued until closing day. Yamamori was portrayed by Meru Tashima and Makiko Saito, Hirono by Yui Yokoyama and Nana Okada, Sakai by Tomu Muto and Miru Shiroma, and Shinkai was played by Yui Oguri and Chihiro Kawakami.
