= Battle Without Honor or Humanity =

Song by Tomoyasu Hotei

"New Battles Without Honor and Humanity Theme"

Song by Tomoyasu Hotei

from the album New Battles Without Honor and Humanity
- Released: November 29, 2000
- Genre: Instrumental rock; funk rock
- Length: 2:28
- Label: EMI Music Japan
- Songwriter: Tomoyasu Hotei

Audio
- "Battle Without Honor or Humanity" on YouTube

"Battle Without Honor or Humanity" (バトル･ウィズアウト･オナー・オア・ヒューマニティー) is an instrumental by the Japanese rock musician Tomoyasu Hotei. It was originally featured in the 2000 film New Battles Without Honor and Humanity (also known as Another Battle) by Junji Sakamoto, which Hotei wrote the soundtrack for and acted in.

On the film's soundtrack, the piece is titled "New Battles Without Honor and Humanity Theme" (新・仁義なき戦いのテーマ, Shin Jingi Naki Tatakai no Tēma). A live performance of the song appears on Hotei's 2001 live album, Rock the Future Tour 2000-2001.

The piece was introduced to Western audiences three years later in Quentin Tarantino's Kill Bill Volume 1 and its soundtrack, where it was retitled "Battle Without Honor or Humanity". Three versions of the track are featured on Hotei's 2004 album Electric Samurai. It was released as a single on June 30, 2004, under the title "Another Battle" (アナザー・バトル). The song continues to be used in a variety of media worldwide, frequently placing it on JASRAC's annual list of the highest-grossing Japanese music recordings based on international royalties. In 2020, it was named the 80th best guitar instrumental by Young Guitar Magazine.

== Reception ==
"Battle Without Honor or Humanity" was named the 80th best guitar instrumental by Young Guitar Magazine in 2020. According to the Japanese Society for Rights of Authors, Composers and Publishers, "New Battles Without Honor and Humanity Theme" has been one of the year's top 10 highest-grossing Japanese recordings based on foreign income multiple times. Based on foreign royalties earned, it was eighth in 2014, rose to sixth in 2015, ranked tenth in 2016 and 2018, rose to third in 2019, and then second in 2020.

== Single track listing ==
1. "Battle Without Honor or Humanity – Original Mix"
2. "Battle Without Honor or Humanity – Samurai Mix"
3. "Battle Without Honor or Humanity – Guitar Karaoke"

== Personnel ==
Personnel for 2004 single version;

- Tomoyasu Hotei – guitar, bass, keyboards
- Toshiyuki Kishi (Abingdon Boys School) – programming, audio edit
- Yoichi Murata – horn arrangements, trombone
- Masahiko – trumpet

== Use in popular media ==
=== Films ===
- New Battles Without Honor and Humanity
- Kill Bill Volume 1
- Zoom (trailer only)
- Transformers
- Shrek the Third
- Kung Fu Panda (trailer only)
- Hotel for Dogs
- Team America: World Police
- Made of Honor
- Hoodwinked Too! Hood vs. Evil
- The Dictator
- Les Dalton
- The Mitchells vs. the Machines
- The Boss Baby: Family Business (trailer only)
- Minions: The Rise of Gru (trailer only)
- The Super Mario Bros. Movie
- Kung Fu Panda 4 (TV Spot only)

=== Television episodes ===
- Dancing With the Stars (season 10 finale)
- Raising Hope (Season 1 Episode 22)
- Black-ish (Season 3 Episode 2)
- Bones (Season 12 Episode 6)
- My Name Is Earl (Season 1 Episode 13)
- Blue Eye Samurai (Season 1 Episode 1)

=== Commercials ===
- "Adrenaline For Success" (Priskila Bellagio Spray Cologne) - 2010
- "Vocal Kombat" (featuring judges from The Voice in hotel lobby battle scenes) – aired during Super Bowl XLVI, Feb. 5, 2012
- "Naturally Pumped Up" (Buxton Mineral Water) – launched May 2014
- “Not For You” (Audi showcasing an electric SUV) – launched April 2019

=== Video games ===
"Battle Without Honor or Humanity" is featured in the 2007 video game Dance Dance Revolution SuperNOVA for the North American PlayStation 2. A cover also appears in the Pop'n Music series in Japan: Pop'n Music 13 Carnival for the PlayStation 2, and Pop'n Music 17 The Movie and Pop'n Music 18 Sengoku Retsuden for arcades. The song also appears in the Gran Turismo HD Concept trailer for the PlayStation 3, and as DLC for the multi-platform game Rocksmith 2014. The song is also featured in Fortnite, used for a collab with Kill Bill.

=== Radio/podcasts ===
- Ron & Fez, during their time on WJFK-FM
- The Herd with Colin Cowherd radio show syndicated in the United States via Fox Sports Radio, simulcast on Fox Sports 1
- The Chris Moyles Show, former breakfast show on BBC Radio 1 - used to introduce their 'Half Time' feature on the show at 9 am
- BaD Radio Show radio show on 1310 The Ticket Dallas
- d20 Docking Bay on the Order 66 podcast
- Used as the theme from The Tom Sullivan Show, a talk radio program syndicated in the United States via News Talk 1530 AM in Sacramento, CA from 12 noon to 3 pm.
- Used on alice 105.9 FM Denver weather announcement
- Used as the opening theme for Drive Time Sports, a local caller-driven sports show on KABZ 103.7 The Buzz in Little Rock, AR.
- Used as the theme for GLoP Culture podcast.

=== Sports ===
- Played as theme song for the NPB and Samurai Japan baseball broadcasts in Tv Asahi (ANN)
  - Including Japanese World Baseball Classic broadcasts, including the 2023 final.
- Played when Queens Park Rangers take to the field at their home ground, Loftus Road
- Played before kickoffs at home Pittsburgh Panthers football games as well as home Pittsburgh Steelers games
- Played when Motherwell FC takes to the field at their home ground, Fir Park
- Played at Bristol City FC's home games at Ashton Gate Stadium
- Played at Sheffield United FC's home games at Bramall Lane
- Various professional wrestlers have used it for their theme music. Paul London used it during part of his tenure in Ring of Honor while Hallowicked has used it outside of his home promotion of CHIKARA Pro, most notably in IWA Mid-South's 2006 Ted Petty Invitational tournament. Yukio Sakaguchi has started to use it since beginning his career in 2012 with Dramatic Dream Team and previously used it in two of his mixed martial arts fights in the Pancrase and Shooto promotions. Pro Wrestling Stable Makai Club also uses it.
- The Kansas State Wildcats men's basketball team home games at Fred Bramlage Coliseum.
- New York Giants pre-game kickoffs at MetLife Stadium
- Played during video reviews at Madison Square Garden during New York Rangers games.
- Bayern Munich Starting XI
- Played when Inter Milan take to the field at their home ground, San Siro
- Heard during the opening ceremony to the Tokyo 2020 Paralympics
- Naoya Inoue's Ring walk music.
- Played when the Minnesota Lynx take the floor for home games.

=== Background music for television shows ===
- The X Factor UK — first three series as entrance music before contestants' performances
- The X Factor USA — used as a dramatic music in many critical moments of the show
- The Block - Australia — judges entrance
- The X Factor UA — judges entrance
- Cultura moderna — Italian game show; used when wheeling out the shed containing the mystery celebrity guest.
- AKBingo! — pre-match trash-talk exchange
- Mogali Rekulu — Telugu TV series. Used as background music for character R.K. Naidu.
