= Shingo Yamashiro =

Japanese actor (1938–2009)

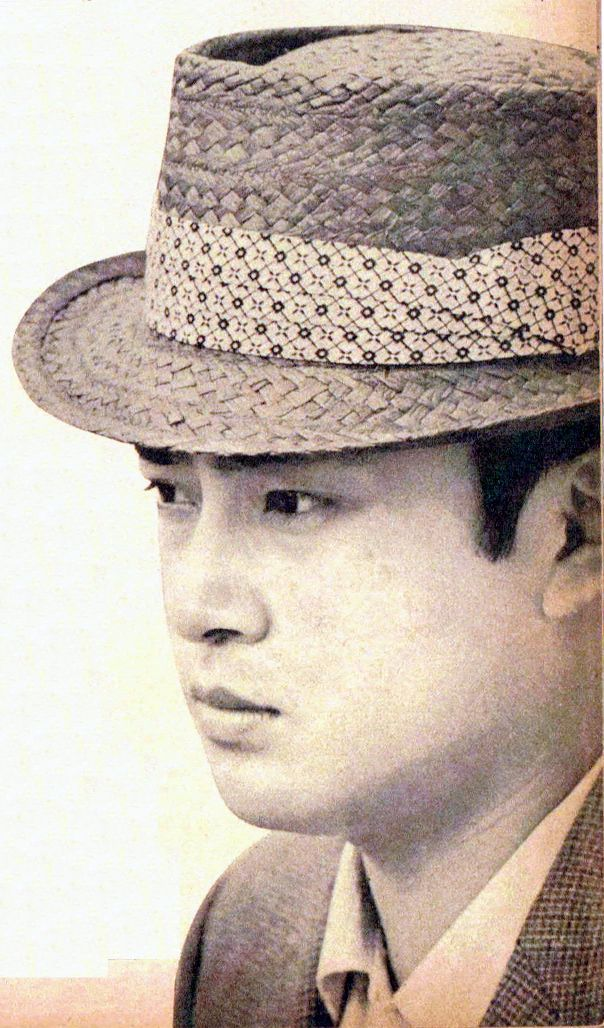
- Born: November 10, 1938; Kyoto, Japan
- Died: August 12, 2009 (aged 70); Tokyo, Japan
- Occupations: Actor, television presenter
- Years active: 1957–2008

Shingo Yamashiro (山城 新伍, Yamashiro Shingo; November 10, 1938 – August 12, 2009) was a Japanese television and film actor.

== Biography ==
Yamashiro, who was originally from Kyoto, Japan, was born Yasuji Watanabe (渡辺 安治, Watanabe Yasuji), but used Shingo Yamashiro as his stage name. He made his film acting debut in 1957.

Yamashiro starred in the television series Hakuba Dōji ("White Horse Rider"), beginning in 1960. During the 1970s, Yamashiro appeared in several yakuza films such as the Battles Without Honor and Humanity series and Gambling Den Heist (1975). Yamashiro also directed occasionally, helming such films in Nikkatsu's Roman porno series as Female Cats (1983) and Gemini Woman (1984). He starred in several variety shows later in his career.

== Later years ==
Yamashiro was admitted to a nursing home in Machida, western Tokyo, for treatment of diabetes. He died of pneumonia at said nursing home on August 12, 2009, at the age of 70.

== Filmography ==
=== Films ===
- 13 Assassins (1963)
- Kunoichi ninpō (1964)
- The Valiant Red Peony (1968)
- Battles Without Honor and Humanity: Deadly Fight in Hiroshima (1973), Shoichi Eda
- Battles Without Honor and Humanity: Proxy War (1973), Shoichi Eda
- Battles Without Honor and Humanity: Police Tactics (1974), Shoichi Eda
- Battles Without Honor and Humanity: Final Episode (1974), Shoichi Eda
- New Battles Without Honor and Humanity (1974), Kenji Yamamori
- The Homeless (1974)
- Cross the Rubicon! (1975)
- Cops vs. Thugs (1975)
- Aftermath of Battles Without Honor and Humanity (1979)
- Final Take (1986), Reikichi Toda
- Hachiko Monogatari (1987)
- Sweet Home (film) (1989)

=== Television ===
- Key Hunter (1969)
- G-Men '75 (1975)
- The Yagyu Conspiracy (1978)
- Furuhata Ninzaburō (1996), Masao Nandaimon
