= Anna Umemiya =

Japanese television personality and model (born 1972)

- 梅宮 アンナ
- Born: 20 August 1972 (age 53); Tokyo, Japan
- Occupations: Tarento; model
- Spouse: "Mr C" (m. 2001; div. 2003)
- Children: Momoka
- Parent: Tatsuo Umemiya

Anna Umemiya (梅宮 アンナ, Umemiya Anna; born August 20, 1972) is a Japanese television personality and model. Born in Tokyo, she is the daughter of a Japanese father and an American mother, herself a former model. Her father, Tatsuo Umemiya, was an actor, and former original Iron Chef judge.

Umemiya has a daughter, Momoka, by her former husband, identified only as "Mr C", whom she divorced on 28 January 2003 after an 18-month marriage.

== Publications ==
- Anna: Ai no Nikki (アンナ 愛の日記 (Anna - Diary of Love)) photo book (1995, Shinchosha, ISBN 978-4-10-326204-6)
- "Minikui Ahiru no Ko" datta Watashi (「みにくいあひるの子」だった私 (I Used to be an Ugly Duckling)) (2001, Kodansha, ISBN 978-4-06-210665-8)
