= Battles Without Honor and Humanity (film) =

1973 Japanese film by Kinji Fukasaku

- Theatrical release poster
- Directed by: Kinji Fukasaku
- Screenplay by: Kazuo Kasahara
- Story by: Koji Shundo (concept); Kōichi Iiboshi (original story); Kōzō Minō (original story)
- Produced by: Koji Shundo; Goro Kusakabe
- Starring: Bunta Sugawara; Hiroki Matsukata; Nobuo Kaneko; Kunie Tanaka; Goro Ibuki
- Narrated by: Asao Koike
- Cinematography: Sadaji Yoshida
- Edited by: Shintaro Miyamoto
- Music by: Toshiaki Tsushima
- Distributed by: Toei
- Release date: January 13, 1973
- Running time: 99 minutes
- Country: Japan
- Language: Japanese

Battles Without Honor and Humanity (Japanese: 仁義なき戦い, Hepburn: Jingi Naki Tatakai) is a 1973 Japanese yakuza film directed by Kinji Fukasaku. The screenplay by Kazuo Kasahara adapts a 1972 series of weekly magazine non-fiction work by writer Kōichi Iiboshi, that were rewrites of a manuscript originally written by real-life yakuza Kōzō Minō. It is the first film in a five-part series that Fukasaku made in a span of just two years.

The violent, documentary-like film chronicles the underworld tribulations of Shozo Hirono (Bunta Sugawara), a young ex-soldier and street thug-turned yakuza in post-war Hiroshima Prefecture. Starting in the open-air black markets of bombed-out Hiroshima in 1946, the film spans a period of more than ten years. The plot consists of a changing of the guard of new families and organizations with the same feuds and people, punctuated by the gritty violence.

Battles Without Honor and Humanity won the 1974 Kinema Junpo Awards for Best Film, Best Actor (Bunta Sugawara) and Best Screenplay (Kazuo Kasahara). In 2009, the magazine named it fifth on a list of the Top 10 Japanese Films of All Time. Due to the series' commercial and critical popularity it was followed by another three-part series, New Battles Without Honor and Humanity.

The film is often called the "Japanese Godfather" and marks a departure from traditional yakuza movies which had, for the most part, been tales of chivalry set in pre-war Japan. The overall tone of the series is bleak, violent and chaotic, expressing the futility of the struggles between yakuza families. In the western market it is also known under the titles Tarnished Code of Yakuza (Australia), War Without a Code, and The Yakuza Papers.

== Plot ==
In 1946 Kure, World War II veteran Shozo Hirono is sent to prison for 12 years after shooting and killing a sword-wielding yakuza for assaulting his friend, Shinichi Yamagata. After a prison brawl, Hirono is sent into solitary confinement together with another prisoner, Hiroshi Wakasugi of the Doi Family, whom he befriends. They quickly become sworn brothers and make a blood oath. Wakasugi attempts harakiri in order to get released, and promises Hirono that, if he survives the attempt, he will arrange for Yoshio Yamamori, head of the Yamamori Family, to bribe the prison warden and get him released early. Hirono gets released, and his gang of fellow ex-soldiers – Tetsuya Sakai, Seiichi Kanbara, Uichi Shinkai, Masakichi Makihara, and Shuji Yano – then join the Yamamori Family by swearing their loyalty and drinking sake during a ceremony. Wakasugi's boss, Patriarch Doi, serves as an official witness to the ceremony, along with Kenichi Okubo, patriarch of the powerful Okubo Family.

Three years later, in 1949, Hirono gets into a fight with a man named Toru Ueda at a gambling den. Since Ueda is a blood relative of Okubo's, Hirono commits yubitsume in apology. Okubo accepts, but asks Yamamori to take Ueda into his family and perform a favor for corrupt politician Shigeto Nakahara by eliminating a vote for his rival Shoichi Kanamaru, who is supported by the Doi Family in a political dispute over allotment of public resources. Sakai kidnaps and threatens one of Kanamaru's allies before the vote, allowing Nakahara's side to win, and goes into hiding afterwards. Doi finds out due to Kanbara bragging about it while drinking and beats him severely, then goes after Yamamori to kill him. However, out of loyalty to Hirono, Wakasugi stops Doi from killing Yamamori and a deal is temporarily brokered: Wakasugi will become a guest member of the Yamamori Family while Kanbara takes his place in the Doi Family.

Six months later, Doi starts moving against Yamamori and prepares to form an alliance with the Kaito Family from Hiroshima. Wakasugi confides to Hirono he intends to kill his boss to end the matter, but is stopped by Hirono telling him it is forbidden by yakuza traditions to betray one’s boss. With the other members also unwilling to act, Hirono volunteers to handle the matter himself to which an emotional Yamamori agrees to leave him his property and will. Hirono successfully assassinates Doi while he's coming out of a meeting with the Kaito Family and escapes. While in hiding, Hirono is visited by Kanbara, who claims Yamamori has sent him to sneak him out of the city. Initially reluctant and suspicious of Kanbara, he gives in shortly after. However, mid-drive, as Kanbara stops to check the engine, a car approaches and opens fire. Hirono flees on foot, and with Kanbara nowhere to be seen, Hirono realizes it was a set-up; finding himself both abandoned by Yamamori and hunted by the Doi Family, he turns himself in for murdering Doi. Wakasugi visits Hirono in prison and raises his suspicions of Yamamori, and tells him he will be taking a trip for some time. Wakasugi murders Kanbara in revenge and goes into hiding, intending to leave for Osaka, but an anonymous tip to the police (provided by Yamamori) leads them to his girlfriend and her parents’s house. After a gunfight with the police, Wakasugi is killed trying to escape.

With the Korean War raging in the 1950s, the Yamamori Family thrives thanks to war contracts and expands in the immediate years, but internal strife begins when members start dealing philopon due to the high kickbacks the boss takes off their earnings. Sakai and Shinkai, who are now high-ranking officers in the family, feud when Shinkai's subordinate, Toshio Arita, who deals the drug against Yamamori's orders. Sakai, agreeing with Shinkai that the boss's take is too high, offers a plan to have each family member become self-sustaining and limit the kickbacks, which only Shinkai and Yano vote against. Shinkai begins plotting with the surviving Doi Family members to kill Sakai. When it's revealed that Yamamori is selling the drugs he confiscates from the other members for personal profit, Sakai and Ueda threaten him and reveal their intention to take over the family. Yamamori has Arita kill Ueda in a barbershop and war breaks out between the two sides. The conflict ends quickly: Shinkai's men and the Doi Family members are murdered by Sakai's associates, Arita shoots a police officer who tries to arrest him and gets a life sentence, and Shinkai is stabbed to death before he can board a train to escape the city.

Hirono's sentence is commuted and he is released from Gifu Prison on parole. He quickly learns about the strife in the Yamamori Family, after which Yamamori takes him out to eat and asks him to kill Sakai, before leaving and making him take on the bill. A subordinate points out that Yamamori is now a rich and sly entrepreneur. Hirono visits Yamagata's former girlfriend's home to pay respects to his altar and finds Sakai there, who has since moved in and had a child with her. Sakai tells Hirono that he is disgusted with Yamamori's leadership, and invites him to join the new organization he's creating, and states with the Kaito Family will also be involved. Hirono declines, but mentions to Sakai that Yamamori asked for him to be killed; while he refuses to kill him, he asks for Sakai to seek out Yamamori and make peace with him so they can rebuild the original family.

Instead, Sakai confronts Yamamori and threatens to kill him if he does not announce his retirement, which he does. Sakai forms an investment company with Yamamori's money and begins negotiating with the Kaito Family. When Makihara informs Sakai that Yano is making a secret trip to persuade the Kaito Family to end the negotiations, Sakai has him gunned down when he arrives. Makihara then contacts Hirono to join him on the supposedly retired Yamamori's side; however, Hirono refuses and instead announces he is breaking off his pledge to Yamamori and leaving his family, saying that he is just as bad as Sakai. Before leaving, they tell him where Sakai is, prompting Hirono to ask if they were the ones who originally betrayed Wakasugi. Yamamori brushes it off and says to forget about the past.

Hirono goes to see Sakai – intending to kill him for having their sworn brother, Yano, killed – but is by restrained by his subordinates. Hirono says they are no longer brothers. Sakai asks Hirono to join up with him, even offering to make him the leader of the organization of the new family he's building, saying that the only thing that ultimately matters is bringing down Yamamori, but he refuses. Sakai allows Hirono to leave, but says he often wishes he could leave the yakuza life. Hirono tells Sakai to keep his guard up. Sakai tells Hirono that he won't kill him today, but will someday. Sakai then leaves to go buy a toy for his child and is immediately murdered by Makihara's hitmen. At Sakai's funeral, with Makihara and Yamamori in attendance, Hirono arrives with a gun. Believing that Sakai would have thought the Buddhist funeral rites a farce, he shoots up the funeral display, threatens Yamamori, and leaves.

== Cast ==
- Bunta Sugawara as Shozo Hirono
- Hiroki Matsukata as Tetsuya Sakai
- Nobuo Kaneko as Patriarch Yoshio Yamamori
- Tatsuo Umemiya as Hiroshi Wakasugi
- Kunie Tanaka as Masakichi Makihara
- Goro Ibuki as Toru Ueda
- Shinichiro Mikami as Uichi Shinkai
- Tamio Kawaji as Seiichi Kanbara
- Tsunehiko Watase as Toshio Arita
- Harumi Sone as Shuji Yano
- Keiji Takamiya as Shinichi Yamagata
- Toshie Kimura as Rika Yamamori
- Asao Uchida as Patriarch Kenichi Okubo
- Hiroshi Nawa as Patriarch Kiyoshi Doi
- Eiko Nakamura as Suzue Kunihiro
- Mayumi Nagisa as Akiko Shinjo
- Kinji Nakamura as Shigeto Nakahara
- Takuzo Kawatani as an unnamed Doi family member

== Production ==
Battles Without Honor and Humanity adapts a series of articles by journalist Kōichi Iiboshi that ran in Weekly Sankei (週刊サンケイ, Shūkan Sankei), that were rewrites of a manuscript originally written by real-life yakuza Kōzō Minō while he was incarcerated in Abashiri Prison. The memoirs detail a yakuza conflict in Hiroshima.

Lead actor Bunta Sugawara claims that he had the initial idea to adapt the memoirs to film. He said that six months before the movie was released, he was on the cover of Shukan Sunday with Tatsuo Umemiya and read this issue that also contained the first installment of the series while on the Shinkansen. Upon arriving in Kyoto he gave it to Toei producer Koji Shundo and told him to read it. Days later, after Shundo still had not done so, Sugawara bought another copy and insisted again. The actor asked Shundo to cast him in an adaptation, with Goro Kusakabe producing and Kinji Fukasaku directing.

=== Screenplay ===
Kazuo Kasahara received the order for the screenplay on September 1, 1972. He revealed that while Toei had gotten the rights to adapt the series from Iiboshi and Weekly Sankei, it seemed they had not bothered to ask Minō. Because the journals were written objectively and therefore easy to read, Kasahara had to flesh them out with details to make it dramatic. Despite Toei advising against it, Kasahara went to Kure with producer Goro Kusakabe on September 29 to meet Minō.

When Kasahara and Kusakabe first asked Minō for permission to adapt his story, he declined not wanting to receive further scorn from his fellow gang members, which he had already received for exposing the inner workings of the lifestyle. However, after learning that Minō and Kasahara both served at the Otake naval officer school in Hiroshima, Minō agreed to help clarify details about the journals but still did not approve a film adaptation.

When he returned to Tokyo, Kasahara told Toei he could work with the incidents in Kure, but not the events that followed in Hiroshima because they were too complicated and they agreed. Although Minō had to be the protagonist, Kasahara found it difficult to create a character based on the notes he had taken and so developed the story around yakuza underboss Tetsuhiko Sasaki, who rebelled against Kyosei-kai leader Tatsuo Yamamura and was killed. He envisioned Bunta Sugawara portraying the character (he later learned Sugawara had already been cast in the role), but said the day before shooting Sugawara was instead cast as Hirono (who is based on Minō) and Hiroki Matsukata took over as Sakai (Sasaki).

Kasahara used the 1936 film La belle équipe as a guide for the action in Battles Without Honor and Humanity. The writer had concerns over organizing the real facts to make stories, as one could not fit everything into an action movie, and how close to stick to reality, settling on a mix of reality and human drama. He deleted all the scenes with Hirono (Minō) interacting with a female heroine, as it was the only request of Minō, who Kasahara felt had given his unspoken approval by now. This is the reason the film ends abruptly. The screenplay took Kasahara 69 days to write.

=== Filming ===
When Shundo selected Fukasaku to direct he received backlash from his Toei colleagues, who felt the director could not make the film "interesting" or "commercial" enough. Shundo himself did not like Fukasaku's earlier films, stating that he made them for his own enjoyment only, but changed his mind after seeing 1972's Street Mobster. Kasahara was against the selection of Fukasaku. Fukasaku biographer Sadao Yamane explained the two had worked together previously and fought over a story Fukasaku disliked, although the two eventually worked over it, the director left the project due to ill health. However, when Fukasaku read the Battles Without Honor and Humanity script he said he would not change a thing and the film was green lit. Filming began in November 1972.

Set in post-war Japan, Fukasaku drew on his experiences as a child during World War II for Battles Without Honor and Humanity. At fifteen he worked with other children in a munitions factory that was regularly bombed. The director recalled "even though we were friends working together, the only thing we would be thinking of was self-preservation. We would try to get behind each other or beneath dead bodies to avoid the bombs.... I also had to clean up all the dead bodies.... I'm sure those experiences have influenced the way I look at violence." The film, noted for its "extreme violence," opens with Japanese soldiers, during America's occupation of their country, stealing food and murdering for a bowl of rice. Using hand-held camera, zoom lenses and natural lighting to create a "gritty, chaotic look," the director showed his generation's struggle to survive in the post-war chaos. The shaky camera technique has since become a trademark of the director.

Toei producer Masao Sato remarked that unusually Fukasaku shot the film in Toei's Kyoto studio, despite being under contract to Toei Tokyo. Fukasaku's son Kenta said that his father's friend Sadao Nakajima arranged to have who he considered the best staff at Toei Kyoto work with Fukasaku, which greatly eased the transition. Sato also stated that the entire filming process was short, hectic and chaotic, taking only 35 to 40 days. Scenes set to be filmed on-location were first rehearsed in studio, before being shot "guerilla-style" with hand-held cameras at the actual location and with civilian passersby giving real reactions. For example, knowing they would never get permission, the scene where the character Uichi Shinkai is stabbed to death at Hiroshima Station was actually shot on the platform of Kyoto Station without permission, before the team left as quickly as possible. Upon filming on location in Kure, many yakuza, including those used as models for characters in the film, gathered on set. They gave advice to both the director and actors; decades later, Tatsuo Umemiya who plays Hiroshi Wakasugi, stated that he felt sorry for actors playing yakuza today because they "don't have the chance to get to know real yakuza the way we did." Producer Shundo himself was formerly a yakuza before getting a job at Toei.

Yamane and Kenta Fukasaku both agreed that the series does not focus on specific lead actors, but is an ensemble piece with the supporting actors energizing it. The stars are narrative characters, with the low-ranking yakuza that are endlessly killed off the real focus of the movies. Sugawara said that this was the first Toei, and even the first Japanese, film to not have the lead actors in every scene.

== Release ==
Battles Without Honor and Humanity has been released on home video and aired on television, the latter with some scenes cut. In 1980, the first four films were edited into a 224-minute compilation and was given a limited theatrical release and broadcast on Toei's TV network. A Blu-ray box set compiling all five films in the series was released on March 21, 2013, to celebrate its 40th anniversary.

All five films in the series were released on DVD in North America by Home Vision Entertainment in 2004, under the moniker The Yakuza Papers. A 6-disc DVD box set containing them all was also released. It includes a bonus disc containing interviews with director William Friedkin, discussing the influence of the films in America; subtitle translator Linda Hoaglund, discussing her work on the films; David Kaplan, Kenta Fukasaku, Kiyoshi Kurosawa, a Toei producer and a biographer among others. Arrow Films released a Blu-ray and DVD box set, limited to 2,500 copies, of all five films in the UK on December 7, 2015, and in the US a day later. Special features include an interview with the series fight choreographer Ryuzo Ueno and the 1980 edited compilation of the first four films.

== Reception and legacy ==
Battles Without Honor and Humanity earned its distributor $4.5 million at the box office, (Note: Mark Schilling notes that this is the distributor's share of the film's theatrical revenue, roughly half of its total earnings.) making it the eleventh highest-grossing film of the year. On Kinema Junpo's annual list of the best films for the year of 1973 as voted by critics, the first film placed second. At the 1974 Kinema Junpo Awards; it won the Reader's Choice for Best Film, Bunta Sugawara received Best Actor, and Kazuo Kasahara received Best Screenplay. In 2009, the magazine named it fifth on an aggregated list of the Top 10 Japanese Films of All Time as voted by over one hundred film critics and writers. Previous editions of the list had the series at number twenty-two in 1995 and eighth in 1999, tied with Twenty-Four Eyes. In 2011, Complex named it number one on their list of The 25 Best Yakuza Movies. The British Film Institute included Battles Without Honor and Humanity as the 1973 entry on their list of the best Japanese films of every year from 1925 to 2020. Jasper Sharp, writing for the BFI, listed it as one of 10 great Japanese gangster movies.

The film is credited as one of the first modern yakuza films; prior, movies about yakuza were known as Ninkyō eiga, "chivalry films", and set in pre-war Japan. The A.V. Club's Noel Murray states that Fukasaku's yakuza instead only "adhere to codes of honor when it's in their best interest, but otherwise bully and kill indiscriminately." Dennis Lim of The Village Voice writes "Fukasaku's yakuza flicks drain criminal netherworlds of romance, crush codes of honor underfoot, and nullify distinctions between good and evil." Film scholar Richard Torrance suggests that the film acts as a "microcosm of the broader society and international order of the post-war period, in which violence lacks moral significance and exists without heroes." This new yakuza film genre became known as Jitsuroku eiga ("actual record film"), often depicting events based on true stories.

Fukasaku biographer Sadao Yamane believes Battles Without Honor and Humanity was popular because of the time of its release; Japan's economic growth was at its peak and at the end of the 1960s the student uprisings took place. The young people had similar feelings to those of the post-war society depicted in the films. Yamane also stated that for the rest of his career Fukasaku was approached many times by producers to create movies similar to Battles, but always turned them down wanting to move on to films he found interesting.

American director William Friedkin stated that Fukasaku's trait of never redeeming bad characters and not catering to have the good guys win in the end was a "profound influence" on himself. He went on to claim that this is something one cannot do today in American films.

A restored version of the film, from a 4K 35mm print original negative to 2K digital by Toei Labo Tech, was screened at the Cannes Classics section of the 2015 Cannes Film Festival.
