= Kōichi Iiboshi =

Japanese writer (1927–1996)

Kōichi Iiboshi (also Koichi or Kohichi) (飯干晃一, Iiboshi Kōichi 2 June 1927, in Osaka – 2 March 1996, in Tokyo) was a Japanese journalist for Yomiuri Shimbun and author.

== Career ==
Iiboshi graduated from Seventh Higher School Zoshikan (now Kagoshima University) and from Faculty of Law, Kyoto University. He was the vice copy chief of the social news division of the national Japanese newspaper Yomiuri Shimbun.

When Shigeru Okada, the president of Tōei Film Studio, got a manuscript from the yakuza Kōzō Minō (美能幸三), he asked Iiboshi to rewrite it as a novel. After that, Iiboshi wrote several series of novels about yakuza conflicts and the dark side of Japanese politics.

== Main works ==
- Jingi naki Tatakai (Battles Without Honor and Humanity) series
- Nihon no Don (Japan's Don) series

== Resources ==
- Asahi Newspaper. Gendai Nihon Jinbutsu Jiten (Who's Who Today). 1990. ISBN 978-4-02-340051-1.
