= Akō Rōshi (1979 TV series) =

1979 Japanese television drama series

- Japanese: 赤穂浪士
- Genre: Jidaigeki
- Directed by: Tadashi Sawashima; Tokuzō Tanaka
- Starring: Yorozuya Kinnosuke; Masakazu Tamura; So Yamamura; Kyōko Kishida; Mikio Narita; Kō Nishimura
- Narrated by: Jukichi Uno
- Theme music composer: Toru Takemitsu
- Country of origin: Japan
- Original language: Japanese
- No. of episodes: 36

Production
- Producer: Tan Takaiwa
- Running time: 45 minutes (per episode)
- Production companies: Toei; Nakamura production

Original release
- Network: TV Asahi
- Release: 16 April – 24 December 1979

Akō Rōshi (赤穂浪士) is a Japanese television jidaigeki or period drama that was broadcast in 1979. It is based on Jirō Osaragi's novel of the same title. It depicts the story of the revenge of the forty-seven rōnin of Ako against Lord Kira from Hotta Hayato's point of view. Kaneto Shindo was in charge of the script for several episodes.

== Plot ==
Set in the eighteenth century, during the reign of the fifth Tokugawa shōgun Tokugawa Tsunayoshi. Akō-han is demolished by the Tokugawa shogunate. Hotta Hayato is a ronin who is living a desperate life because of his sad past. But one day he starts working for Chisaka Takafusa, the Chief retainer(Karō) of the Uesugi clan. The Uesugi clan and Chisaka are wary of Ōishi Kuranosuke and Ako Roshi's movements, so Chisaka orders Hotta to observe Ōishi Kuranosuke. But Hotta gradually comes to like the personality of Ōishi and even helps Ōishi.

== Cast ==
=== Starring role ===
- Yorozuya Kinnosuke as Ōishi Kuranosuke
- Masakazu Tamura as Hotta Hayato

=== Asano Clan/ Akō Rōshi ===
- Keiko Matsuzaka as Aguri
- Kyōko Kishida as Ōishi Riku
- Ken Matsudaira as Asano Takumi no Kami
- Kohji Moritsugu as Maehara Isuke
- Goro Ibuki as Horibe Yasubei
- Ryosuke Kagawa as Horibe Yahei
- Kazuo Kitamura as Ōno Kurobei
- Genji Kawai as Okuda Magodayou
- Rantaro Mine as Hazama Shinroku
- Shunya Wazaki as Kataoka Gengoemon
- Kō Nishimura as Onodera Jyounai
- Nobuo Kawai as Fujii Mataemon
- Ken Nishida as Shindo Toshimoto
- Akiji Kobayashi as Hara Sōemon

=== Uesugi Clan/Kira Clan ===
- So Yamamura as Chisaka Takafusa
- Eitaro Ozawa as Kira Kōzuke no suke
- Rokkō Toura as Matsubara
- Yūki Meguro as Uesugi Noritsuna
- Yūsuke Kawazu as Kobayashi Haihichi

=== Tokugawa Shogunate ===
- Katsuo Nakamura as Tokugawa Tsunayoshi
- Mikio Narita as Yanagisawa Yoshiyasu
- Shinsuke Mikimoto as Araki Jūzaemon
- Shigeru Amachi as Wakizaka Awaji no kami
- Toshiro Mifune as Tachibana Sakon (special appearance)

=== Others ===
- Shingo Yamashiro as Maruoka
- Junko Miyashita as Ochika
- Katsumasa Uchida as Iizawa Shinnosuke
- Nenji Kobayashi as Iwase Kageyu
- Mie Nakao
- Yūsuke Takita
- Ryunosuke Kaneda as Ryukō
- Yutaka Nakajima as Oen
- Isamu Nagato as Kumo no Bunjyuro
- Jun Hamamura as Hozumi Sōzaemon
- Yoshio Inaba as Nakajima Gorosaku
- Hiroki Matsukata as Tsuchiya Chikara (special appearance)
- Mayumi Ogawa as Yougiri Dayou (special appearance)

== Episodes ==
- 1, Hana no Ame 花の雨
- 2, Toshou Matsu no Dairōka 刃傷 松の大廊下
- 3, Hiruandon to Neko Hiyōbu 昼行燈と猫兵部
- 4, Jorō Gumo 女郎蜘蛛
- 5, Fuuno Midareru Akō Jō 風雲乱れる赤穂城
- 6, Hokoritakaki Bushi 誇り高き武士
- 7, Antō 暗闘
- 8, Missho 密書
- 9.Ketsudan 決断
- 10, Haru no Arashi 春の嵐
- 11, Kuranosuke Anstsu 内蔵助暗殺
- 12, Ippatsu no Jūsei 一発の銃声
- 13, Shiro Akewatashi 城明け渡し
- 14, Matatabi またたび
- 15, Bōenkyō 遠眼鏡
- 16, Yugao no Onna 夕顔の女
- 17, Kinjirareta Koi 禁じられた恋
- 18, Semi Shigure 蝉しぐれ
- 19, Hiren no Omoji 悲恋の大文字
- 20, Hotarubi 螢火
- 21, Twuioku no Aki 追憶の秋
- 22, Kuranosuke Edoe 内蔵助 江戸へ
- 23, Saikai 再会
- 24, Jōen
- 25, Kiratei wo Sagure
- 26, Yamashina no Wakare
- 27, Hahato Ko Higan no katami
- 28, Adauchi eno Kadode
- 29, Datsuraku suru Seishun
- 30, Oishi Azumakudari
- 31, Hissi no Kōbō
- 32, Shukume no Shitō
- 33, Uchiiri Zenya 討入り前夜
- 34, Iza! Uchiiri いざ! 討入り
- 35, Akatsuki no Gaisen 暁の凱旋
- 36, Genroku Bushidō 元禄武士道
