= The 47 Ronin (1941 film) =

1941 film directed by Kenji Mizoguchi

- Theatrical release poster
- Directed by: Kenji Mizoguchi
- Screenplay by: Kenichirō Hara; Yoshikata Yoda
- Based on: the kabuki play by Mayama Seika
- Produced by: Shintarô Shirai
- Starring: Chōjuro Kawarasaki; Kan'emon Nakamura; Kunitarō Kawarazaki; Utaemon Ichikawa
- Cinematography: Kōhei Sugiyama
- Edited by: Takako Kuji
- Music by: Shirō Fukai
- Production company: Shochiku
- Distributed by: Shochiku Kinema Kenkyu-jo
- Release dates: December 1, 1941 (Part 1); February 11, 1942 (Part 2)
- Running time: 223 min. 112 min. (part 1); 111 min. (part 2)
- Country: Japan
- Language: Japanese

The 47 Ronin (元禄 忠臣蔵, Genroku Chūshingura; "The Treasury of Loyal Retainers of the Genroku Era") is a black-and-white two-part jidaigeki Japanese film directed by Kenji Mizoguchi, adapted from a play by Seika Mayama. The first part was released on December 1, 1941, with the second part being released on February 11 of the following year. The film depicts the legendary forty-seven Ronin and their plot to avenge the death of their lord, Asano Naganori, by killing Kira Yoshinaka, a shogunate official responsible for Asano being forced to commit the act of seppuku. The film received positive reviews from critics.

Full movie

== Plot ==
The plot revolves around the consequences of an attack by Lord Asano Naganori on Lord Kira Yoshinaka, an influential court official in the Tokugawa Shogunate. After overhearing Kira insult him in public, Asano strikes Kira with a sword in the corridors of Edo Castle, but succeeds only in wounding him. As attacking a Shogunate official is a grave offense, Shogun Tokugawa Tsunayoshi sentences Asano to commit seppuku and issues an edict stripping the Asano Clan of their lands and wealth. Kira, meanwhile, is not punished by the Shogun because, it is thought, of family connections. As a result of the Shogun's judgement, all samurai loyal to the Asano Clan become rōnin while the late Lord Asano's family is ruined. Many of the rōnin wish to seek revenge against Kira for the dishonor of their Lord, but their leader, Ōishi Kuranosuke, convinces them to wait while he first petitions the Shogun to restore the Asano Clan. When the Shogun refuses his request, Ōishi and the other forty-six rōnin begin planning their revenge. But because Kira has surrounded himself with warriors in his residence, Ōishi first disarms suspicion by posing as a drunkard and womanizer, to his own dishonor, and goes to the length of divorcing his wife.

Almost two years after the death of Asano, the forty-seven assemble in Edo and stage an attack on Kira's residence, resulting in Kira and several of his followers being killed. This is not shown on the screen but is reported in a letter to Asano's wife, who has returned to her father. After laying Kira's head on Asano's grave and formally making a report of their actions before it, the forty-seven turn themselves in to the authorities. There is sympathy for the rōnin for their faithfulness and sacrifice in such difficult circumstances and the forty-seven are granted the honorable death of committing seppuku despite their act of defiance. This comes at the end of some months' deliberation and is greeted with singing and dancing by the warriors. Each is then summoned down the corridors of the castle to enact the sentence; Ōishi is left until last and courteously excuses himself to the visitor to his room when his turn comes.

== Cast ==
Actors in the film include:

- Chōjuro Kawarasaki as Ōishi Kuranosuke (大石 内蔵助)
- Kan'emon Nakamura as Tominomori Sukeemon (富森 助右衛門)
- Kunitarō Kawarazaki as Isogai Jūrōzaemon (礒貝 十郎左衛門)
- Chōemon Bandō as Hara Sōemon (原 惣右衛門)
- Sukezō Sukedakaya as Yoshida Chūzaemon (吉田 忠左衛門)
- Kikunojo Segawa as Otaka Gengo (大高 源五)
- Utaemon Ichikawa as Tokugawa Ienobu (徳川 家宣)
- Yoshizaburō Arashi as Asano Naganori (浅野 長矩)
- Kazutoyo Mimasu as Kira Yoshinaka (吉良 義央)
- Tokusaburō Arashi as Okuno Shōgen (奥野 将監)
- Masao Shimizu as Katō Akihide (加藤 明英)
- Mitsuko Miura as Yosenin (瑤泉院), Asano's wife

Uncredited

- Seizaburō Kawazu as Hosokawa Tsunatoshi (細川 綱利)
- Mieko Takamine as Omino (おみの), Isogai's fiancée

== Inception ==
During the war, Kenji Mizoguchi was forced to make artistic compromises, producing propaganda for the military government. In 1941, the Japanese military commissioned him to make Genroku Chūshingura. They wanted a ferocious morale booster based on the familiar rekishi geki ("historical drama") of The Loyal 47 Ronin. Instead, Mizoguchi chose for his source Mayama Chūshingura, a cerebral play dealing with the story. The government foisted the project on the director as a wartime morale booster, and as justification for the expansionist, nationalistic, and ultimately suicidal world war that Japan was embroiled in during the middle of the 20th century. The film is prefaced by the words: Defend the Homes of Those Who Fight for a Greater Asia (護れ興亞の兵の家)

== Release and Reception ==
Part One was a commercial failure at a cost of ¥530,000, having been released in Japan one week before the attack on Pearl Harbor. The Japanese military and most audiences found the first part to be too serious, but the studio and Mizoguchi both regarded it as so important that Part Two was put into production, despite lukewarm reception for Part One. The film wasn't shown in America until the 1970s.

On the review aggregator website Rotten Tomatoes, 82% of 33 critics' reviews are positive.

Richard Brody of The New Yorker wrote of the film, "The 47 Ronin is, simply, one of the great political films of all time... To satisfy the wartime norms of the day, he exalts classical Japanese warriors as self-sacrificing men of unimpeachable principle... Yet Mizoguchi builds the story to a crescendo of nobility and bloodshed through the intervention of a woman, the fiancé of one of the samurai, whose romantic concerns--though feared to be destructive of the samurai spirit--prove to be as noble, as courageous, as civic-minded, and as grand as one of the warriors."

Robin Syversen, writing for Japanese Cinema Archives, praised the film, calling it a "masterpiece" and "a Japanese classic."

== See also ==
- The Loyal 47 Ronin (忠臣蔵 Chushingura) – 1958 film by Kunio Watanabe, Daiei star-studded cast
- Akō Rōshi – 1961 film by Sadatsugu Matsuda, Toei star-studded cast
- Chushingura: Hana no Maki, Yuki no Maki – 1962 color film directed by Hiroshi Inagaki, Toho star-studded cast
- Daichūshingura (大忠臣蔵, Daichūshingura) – 1971 television dramatization
- The Fall of Ako Castle (赤穂城断絶, Akō-jō danzetsu) (aka Swords Of Vengeance) – 1978 film by Kinji Fukasaku
- Matsu no Ōrōka
- List of historical drama films of Asia
