= Daichūshingura =

- Also known as: 大忠臣蔵
- Genre: Jidaigeki
- Directed by: Mitsuo Murayama; Takumi Furukawa
- Starring: Toshiro Mifune; Tetsuya Watari; Tetsuro Tamba; Takashi Shimura; Masakazu Tamura
- Theme music composer: Isao Tomita
- Country of origin: Japan
- Original language: Japanese
- No. of episodes: 52

Production
- Running time: 45 minutes (per episode)
- Production companies: TV Asahi, Mifune production

Original release
- Network: TV Asahi
- Release: January 5 – December 26, 1971

Daichūshingura (大忠臣蔵) (Dai Chushingura) is a Japanese television dramatization of the events of the Forty-seven Ronin. The first episode aired on January 5, 1971, and the 52nd and final episode appeared on December 28 of the same year. The NET network broadcast it in the Tuesday evening 9:00–9:56 prime-time slot in Japan.

The series featured an all-star cast. The central actor was Toshiro Mifune, who portrayed Ōishi Kuranosuke; Yoko Tsukasa his wife; and kabuki actor Onoe Kikugorō VII their son Chikara.

Ichikawa Chūsha VIII took the part of Kira Yoshinaka, but died after the filming of Episode 47; his brother Kodayū replaced him.

Many actors appeared as guest stars in only a few episodes. Among them were many known to audiences outside Japan. These included superstar Kinnosuke Nakamura as Wakisaka Awaji-no-kami, Matsumoto Kōshirō, Shintaro Katsu (of Zatoichi fame), Mifune's frequent co-star Takashi Shimura, Eiji Okada, Yukiyo Toake, Kinichi Hagimoto, Terumi Niki, Masaaki Sakai, and Shinji Maki.

The series has been rerun during the more than 35 years that have passed since it was first aired. It is available in several DVD sets.

== Cast ==
- Toshiro Mifune as Ōishi Yoshio
- Tetsuya Watari as Horibe Yasubei
- Yoko Tsukasa as Ōishi Riku
- Go Wakabayashi as Maebara Isuke
- Shinjirō Ehara as Kataoka Gengoemon
- Yūnosuke Itō as Ōno Kurobei
- Masakazu Tamura as Yato Emohichi
- Takahiro Tamura as Takadaya Gunbei
- Tetsuro Tamba as Chisaka Takafusa
- Shigeru Tsuyuguchi as Usuke
- Ichiro Arishima
- Etsushi Takahashi as Mori Koheita
- Kōji Ishizaka as Kayano Sanppie
- Yoko Yamamoto as Okei
- Kunio Murai
- Takeo Chii as Minagawa Shoroku
- Yoshiko Sakuma
- Miyoko Akaza
- Ryosuke Kagawa as Hara Sōemon
- Kenji Imai as Saitō Seizaemon
- Nobuo Kawai as Endō Sanzaemon
- Tamao Nakamura as Aiba Shino
- Frankie Sakai as Akabane Genzo
- Yoshi Kato as Yato Chosuke
- Yoshio Tsuchiya as Tsuchiya Shuzen
- Yoshio Inaba
- Katsumasa Uchida as Gojō Ryuta
- Isao Yamagata
- Shigeru Kōyama as Yanagisawa Yoshiyasu
- Akiji Kobayashi as Terasaka Kichiemon
- Katsuo Nakamura as Okano Kingoemon
- Shinsuke Ashida as Kobayashi Haihachi
- Shigeru Amachi as Shimizu Ichigaku
- Junzaburo Ban as Onodera Junai
- Jun Tazaki
- Hideo Takamatsu as Rinzo Kakui
- Toru Abe
- Takashi Shimura as Horiuchi Denbeiemon
- Akihiko Hirata as Horiuchi Gentaemon
- Shintaro Katsu as Tawaraboshi Genba
- Kōji Mitsui as Hirakichi
