= Takebayashi Takashige =

Japanese samurai (1672–1703)

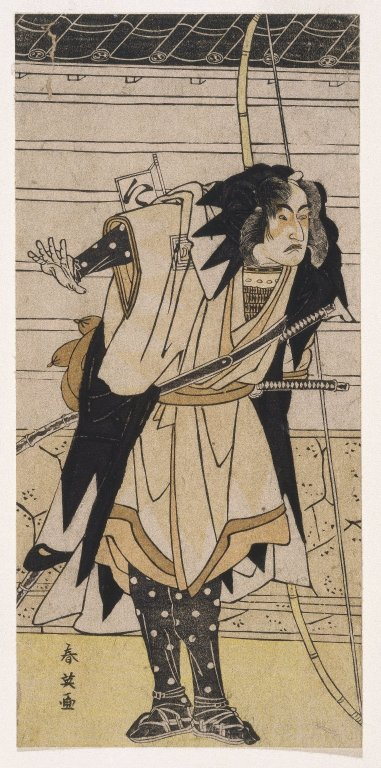
Brooklyn Museum - The Actor Ichikawa Yaozo III as Takebayashi Tadashichi from Chusingura - Katsukawa Shunei.

Takebayashi Tadashichi Takashige (Japanese: 武林 唯七 隆重; 1672 – March 20, 1703) was a samurai in the early Edo period of Japan. He participated in the revenge of forty-seven rōnin (also known as the Akō incident) as one of the rōnin. Takashige was originally a subordinate of the daimyō Asano Naganori, master of Akō Domain.

== Early life ==
Takashige was born in Akō in 1672. His family was originally from Hangzhou, Zhejiang, China. His only brother was Takebayashi Tadataka. His grandfather Watanabe Kotonori was a Ming dynasty soldier. After he was captured by Japanese forces during the Japanese invasions of Korea, Kotonori settled down in the Hiroshima domain, where he served the Mōri clan as a physician. Later, the family moved to Akō domain. Takashige's surname Takebayashi (武林) is an alternative and indigenous name of Hangzhou.

== Samurai ==
Asano Naganori, the master of Akō domain, was involved in a quarrel with another daimyō, Kira Yoshinaka, and injured Yoshihisa with his katana. This was seen as irreverent by the shogunate. Naganori was sentenced to seppuku and died. The incident left Takashige unemployed with great shame.

After accepting Ōishi Yoshio's invitation, Takashige joined the vendetta that sought the head of Kira Yoshinaka. Takeshige was part of the group assigned to assault the front door and broke into Yoshihisa's house. Later he found an old man with white hair hiding. They identified him by the scar left by Naganori. Takashige finished Yoshihisa's life with his katana after Hazama Mitsuoki stabbed the victim with a spear.

Yoshihisa was decapitated. Takashige and the other ronins presented his head in front of the tomb of Naganori.

Takashige was sentenced to commit seppuku in 1703. He was 32 years old when he died.
