= Ōno Kurobei =

Japanese samurai and retainer of the Akō domain

Ōno Kurobei (大野九郎兵衛) (?–1751) was a senior retainer (karō) of the Akō Domain in Harima Province, held by the Asano family. He served as castle-deputy house elder (rūsui karō) and received an annual stipend of 650 koku.

== Biography ==
Ōno specialized in economic affairs, managing the domain's finances and overseeing the development of reclaimed land for rice cultivation. He was promoted to karō as a result of his service.

In 1701, his lord Asano Naganori attacked Kira Kōzuke no Suke within Edo Castle and was sentenced to commit seppuku, resulting in the confiscation of the Akō domain. During the subsequent council of retainers, Ōno clashed with Ōishi Yoshio over the response. Ōno favored surrendering the castle to the Tokugawa shogunate, while Ōishi and other retainers preferred resistance. The two also disagreed over the distribution of remaining domain funds: Ōno insisted on allocating money proportional to annual stipend, while Ōishi favored those with lower incomes. The funds were distributed according to Ōishi's plan.

During the dispute over the exchange of domainal paper currency (hansatsu), Ōno came into conflict with Okajima Yasōemon. He fled Akō by ship on May 19, 1701, loading household goods but leaving his young daughter behind in the confusion. He settled near Ninna-ji in Kyoto, where he took the name Bankannshō.

The circumstances of his death are uncertain. A gravestone at Matsugishi Temple in Annaka, Gunma Prefecture, records his death as the twenty-fourth day of the ninth month, 1751.

== In fiction ==
Ōno's fictional counterpart appears as the character Ōnoe Kudayū in Kanadehon Chūshingura, the celebrated 1748 bunraku and kabuki play based on the Akō incident. In this and later adaptations, he is typically portrayed as a disloyal coward and spy for Kira, though the historical record suggests he was a capable administrator who took a pragmatic position during the domain's crisis.
