= Matsu no Ōrōka =

Part of Edo Castle

Coordinates: 35°41′07″N 139°45′20″E

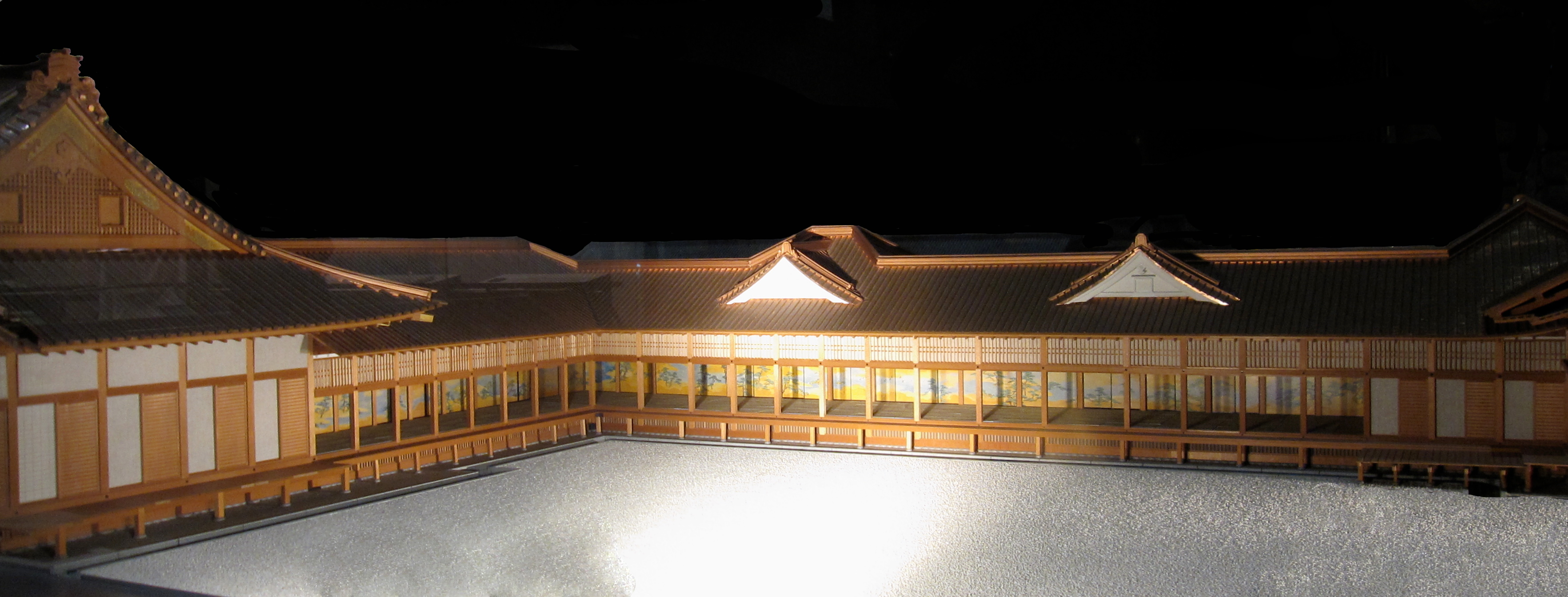
1:30 scale architectural model of the Matsu no Ōrōka (middle) that connected the Shiroshoin and Ōhiroma (Edo-Tokyo Museum)

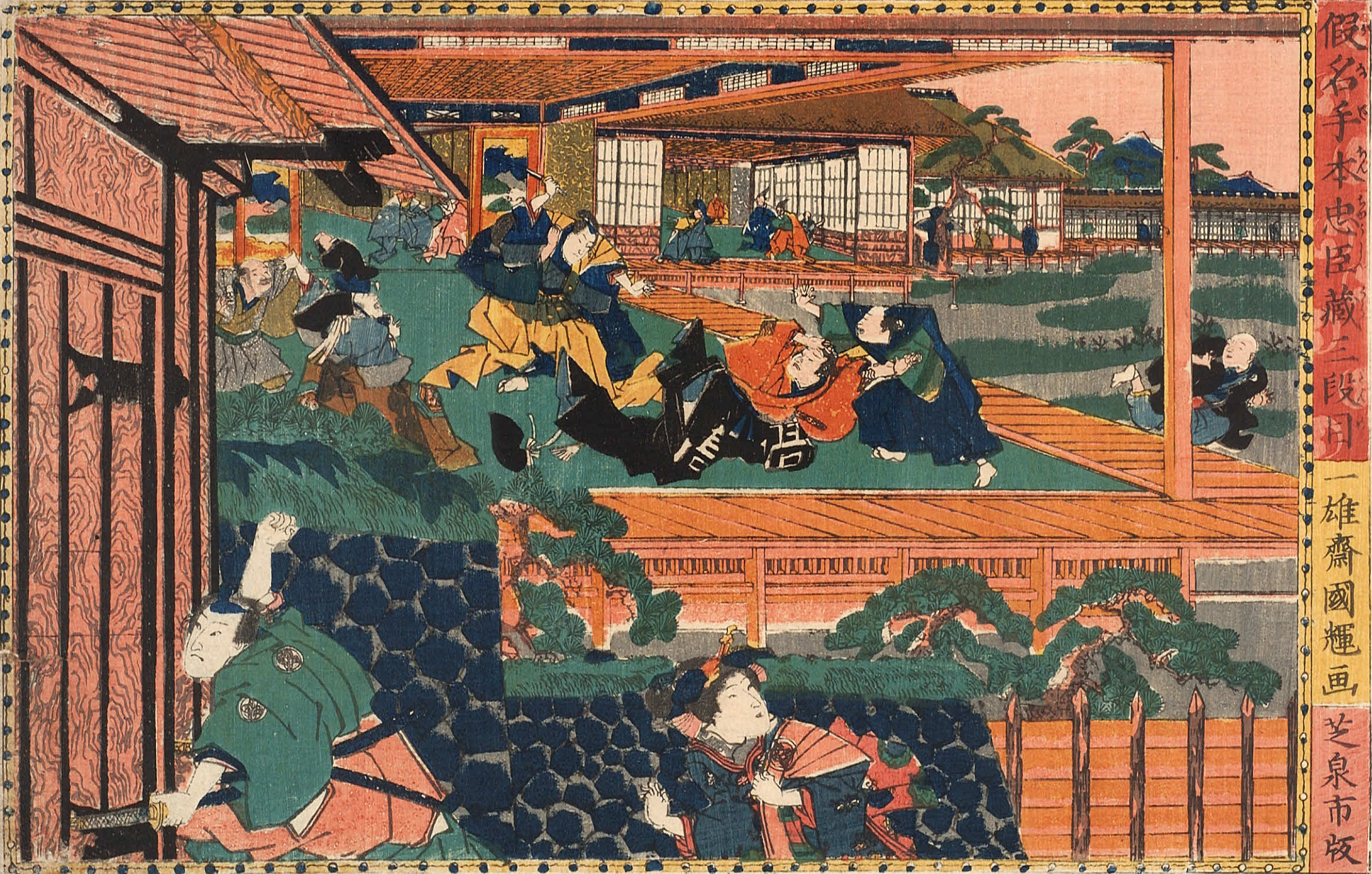
Ukiyo-e depicting the assault of Asano Naganori on Kira Yoshinaka in the Matsu no Ōrōka in 1701

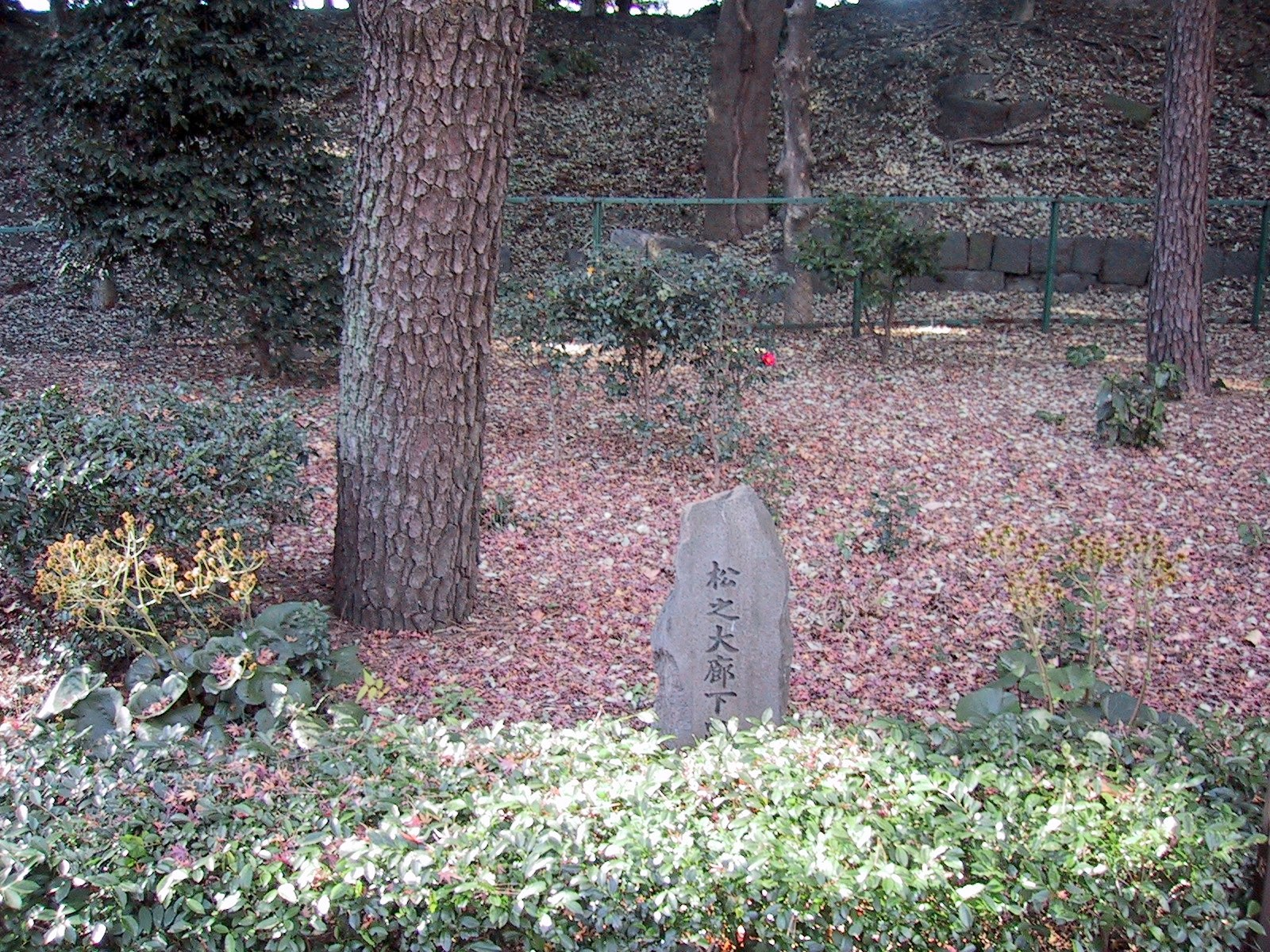
Memorial stone on the site of the Matsu no Ōrōka

The Matsu no Ōrōka (松之大廊下, Great Pine Corridor or Hallway) was part of Edo Castle. The name derives from the painted shōji (sliding doors) that were decorated with motifs of Japanese pine trees (matsu).

It was the passage which led to the Shiroshoin (白書院) from the Ōhiroma of the Honnmaru Goten (本丸御殿). The corridor measured around 50 meters in length and 4 meters in width. The corridor was the second longest with tatami mats in the castle.

On March 14, 1701, Asano Takumi no Kami Naganori attacked and injured Kira Kozuke no Suke Yoshihisa after an insult there, which later led to the bloody incident of the Forty-seven rōnin.

The corridor does not exist anymore just like the rest of the Shōgun's palace shortly before or during the Meiji Restoration in the later half of the 19th century. A stone marker with an inscription stands today in its place.

The Great Pine Corridor has entered legends in stories such as the Chūshingura and also features in movies, parodies and TV advertisements.
