= Chisaka Takafusa =

High-ranking samurai in Japan during the Edo period

Chisaka Takafusa (千坂高房, 1638 – June 25, 1700) was a high-ranking samurai in Japan during the Edo period. He was a karō in the Yonezawa Domain under the Uesugi clan. He is also known as Chisaka Hyōbu (千坂兵部). Although he died prior to the events of the Forty-seven rōnin, he appears in fictional accounts, including the 1971 Daichūshingura starring Toshirō Mifune. He also appears in the 1999 NHK Taiga drama Genroku Ryōran.

The Meiji period politician-businessman Chisaka Takamasa was a descendant of Takafusa.
