= Forty-seven rōnin =

Samurai battle on 31 January 1703

Akō jiken
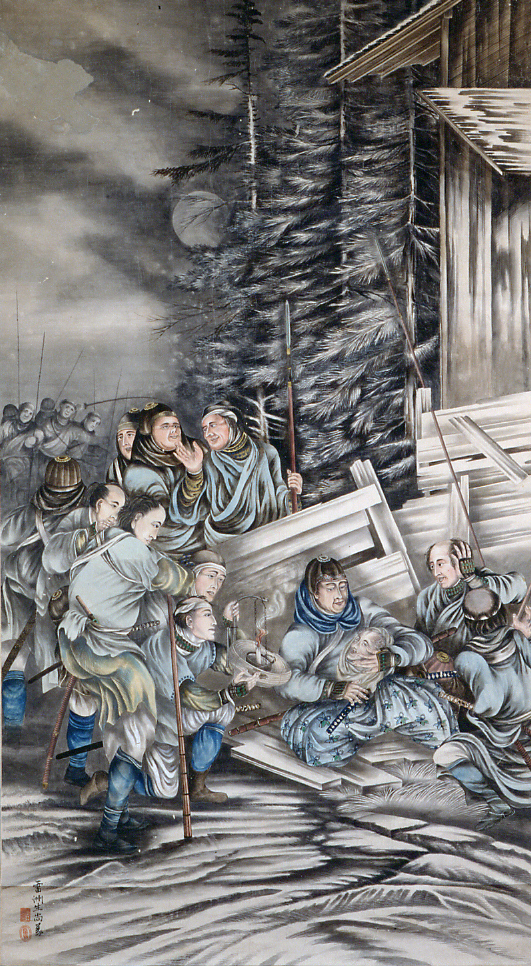
- Revenge of the Loyal Samurai of Akō by Yasuda Raishū (ja) (Homma Museum of Art), with iconography borrowed from the Adoration of the Shepherds
- Native name: 赤穂事件
- English name: Akō incident
- Date: 31 January 1703
- Venue: Kira Residence
- Location: 35°41′36.0″N 139°47′39.5″E
- Type: Revenge attack
- Cause: Death of Asano Naganori
- Target: To have Kira Yoshinaka commit ritual suicide (seppuku) to avenge their master Asano Naganori's death
- First reporter: Terasaka Kichiemon
- Organized by: Forty-seven rōnin (四十七士, Akō-rōshi (赤穂浪士)) led by Ōishi Yoshio
- Participants: 47
- Deaths: 19
- Injuries: 22
- Accused: Forty-seven rōnin
- Sentence: 46 rōnin sentenced to ritual suicide (seppuku) on 4 February 1703, with 1 pardoned

The revenge of the forty-seven rōnin (四十七士, Shijūshichishi), also known as the Akō incident (赤穂事件, Akō jiken) or Akō vendetta, was a historical event in Japan in which a band of rōnin (lordless samurai) avenged the death of their former master on 31 January 1703. The incident has since become legendary. It is among the three major vengeance (adauchi 仇討ち) incidents in Japan, along with the Revenge of the Soga Brothers and the Igagoe vendetta.

The story tells of a group of samurai after their daimyō (feudal lord) Asano Naganori was compelled to perform seppuku (ritual suicide) for assaulting a powerful court official (kōke) named Kira Yoshinaka, after the court official insulted him. After waiting and planning for two years, the rōnin avenged their master's honor by killing Kira. Anticipating the authorities' intolerance of the vendetta's completion, they were prepared to face execution as a consequence. However, due to considerable public support in their favor, the authorities compromised by ordering forty-six of the rōnin to commit seppuku as an honorable death for the crime of murder, while the youngest, Terasaka Kichiemon, was pardoned. This true story was popular in Japanese culture as emblematic of loyalty, sacrifice, persistence, and honor (qualities samurai followed called bushidō) that people should display in their daily lives. The popularity of the tale grew during the Meiji era, during which Japan underwent rapid modernization, and the legend became entrenched in discourses of national heritage and identity.

Fictionalized accounts of the tale of the forty-seven rōnin are known as Chūshingura. The story was popularized in numerous plays, including in the genres of bunraku and kabuki. Because of the censorship laws of the shogunate in the Genroku era, which forbade the portrayal of current events, the names were changed. The first Chūshingura was written some 50 years after the event, and numerous historical records about the actual event that predate the Chūshingura survive. The bakufu's censorship laws had relaxed somewhat 75 years after the event in the late 18th century when Japanologist Isaac Titsingh first recorded the story of the forty-seven rōnin as one of the significant events of the Genroku era.

The story remains popular in Japan. While the attack was carried out on 31 January, the event is commemorated annually on 14 December. Sengakuji Temple, where Asano Naganori and the rōnin are buried, holds a festival commemorating the event.

== Name ==
The event is known in Japan as the Akō incident (赤穂事件, Akō jiken), sometimes also referred to as the Akō vendetta. The participants in the revenge are called the Akō-gishi (赤穂義士), Akō-rōshi (赤穂浪士) or Shi-jū-shichi-shi (四十七士) in Japanese, and are usually referred to as the "forty-seven rōnin". Literary accounts of the events are known as the Chūshingura (忠臣蔵, The Treasury of Loyal Retainers).

== Story ==
For many years, the version of events retold by A. B. Mitford in Tales of Old Japan (1871) was generally considered authoritative. The sequence of events and the characters in this narrative were presented to a wide popular readership in the West. Mitford invited his readers to construe his story of the forty-seven rōnin as historically accurate; and while his version of the tale has long been considered a standard work, some of its details are now questioned. Nevertheless, even with plausible defects, Mitford's work remains a conventional starting point for further study.

Whether as a mere literary device or as a claim for ethnographic veracity, Mitford explains:

In the midst of a nest of venerable trees in Takanawa, a suburb of Yedo, is hidden Sengakuji, or the Spring-hill Temple, renowned throughout the length and breadth of the land for its cemetery, which contains the graves of the forty-seven rônin, famous in Japanese history, heroes of Japanese drama, the tale of whose deed I am about to transcribe.

— Mitford, A. B. [emphasis added]

Mitford appended what he explained were translations of Sengaku-ji documents the author had examined personally. These were proffered as "proofs" authenticating the factual basis of his story. These documents were:

1. ...the receipt given by the retainers of Kira Kōtsukē no Sukē's son in return for the head of their lord's father, which the priests restored to the family.
2. ...a document explanatory of their conduct, a copy of which was found on the person of each of the forty-seven men, dated in the 15th year of Genroku, 12th month.
3. ...a paper which the Forty-seven Rōnin laid upon the tomb of their master, together with the head of Kira Kôtsuké no Suké.

=== Background ===
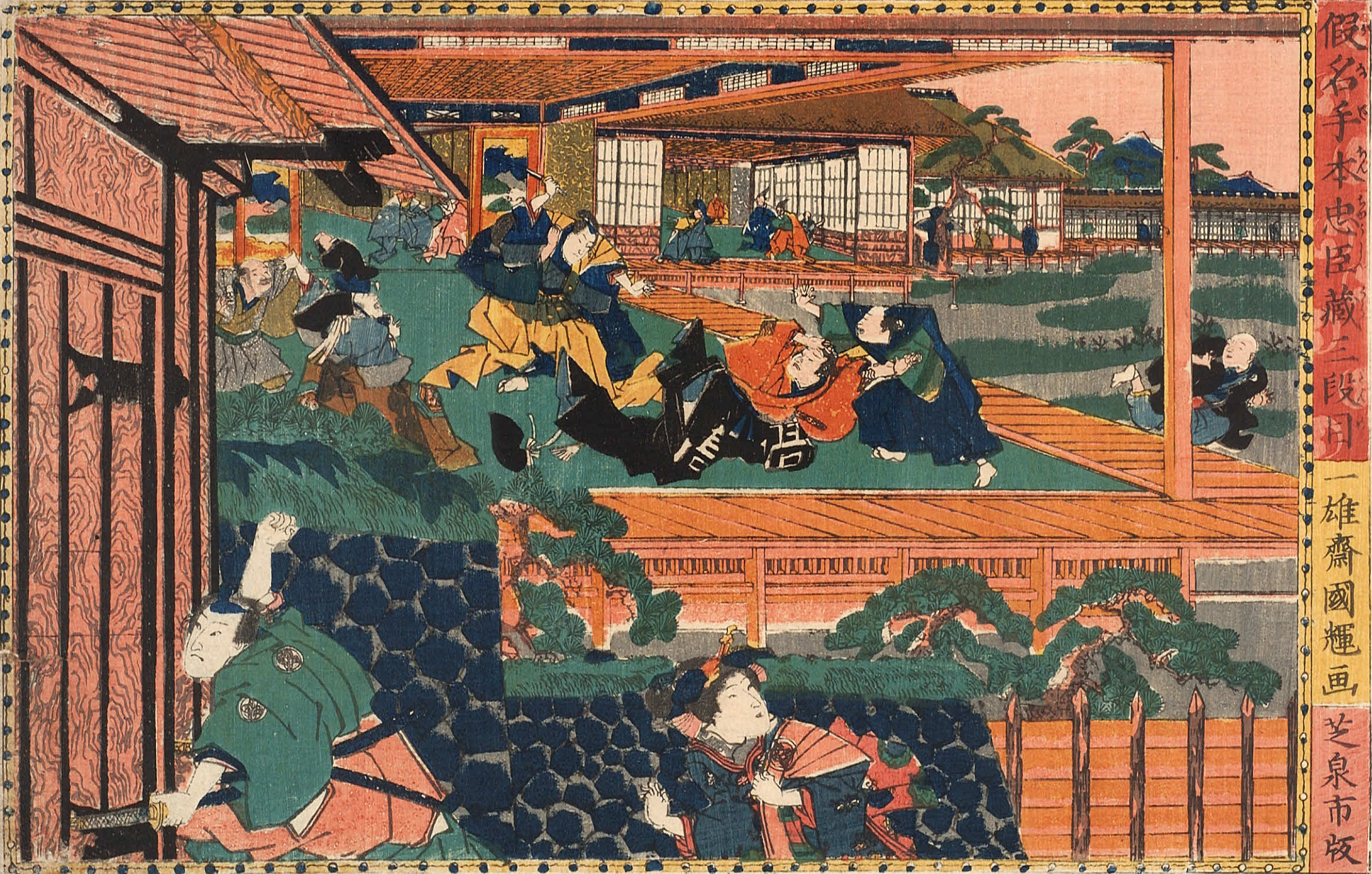
Ukiyo-e print depicting Asano Naganori's assault on Kira Yoshinaka in the Matsu no Ōrōka of Edo Castle

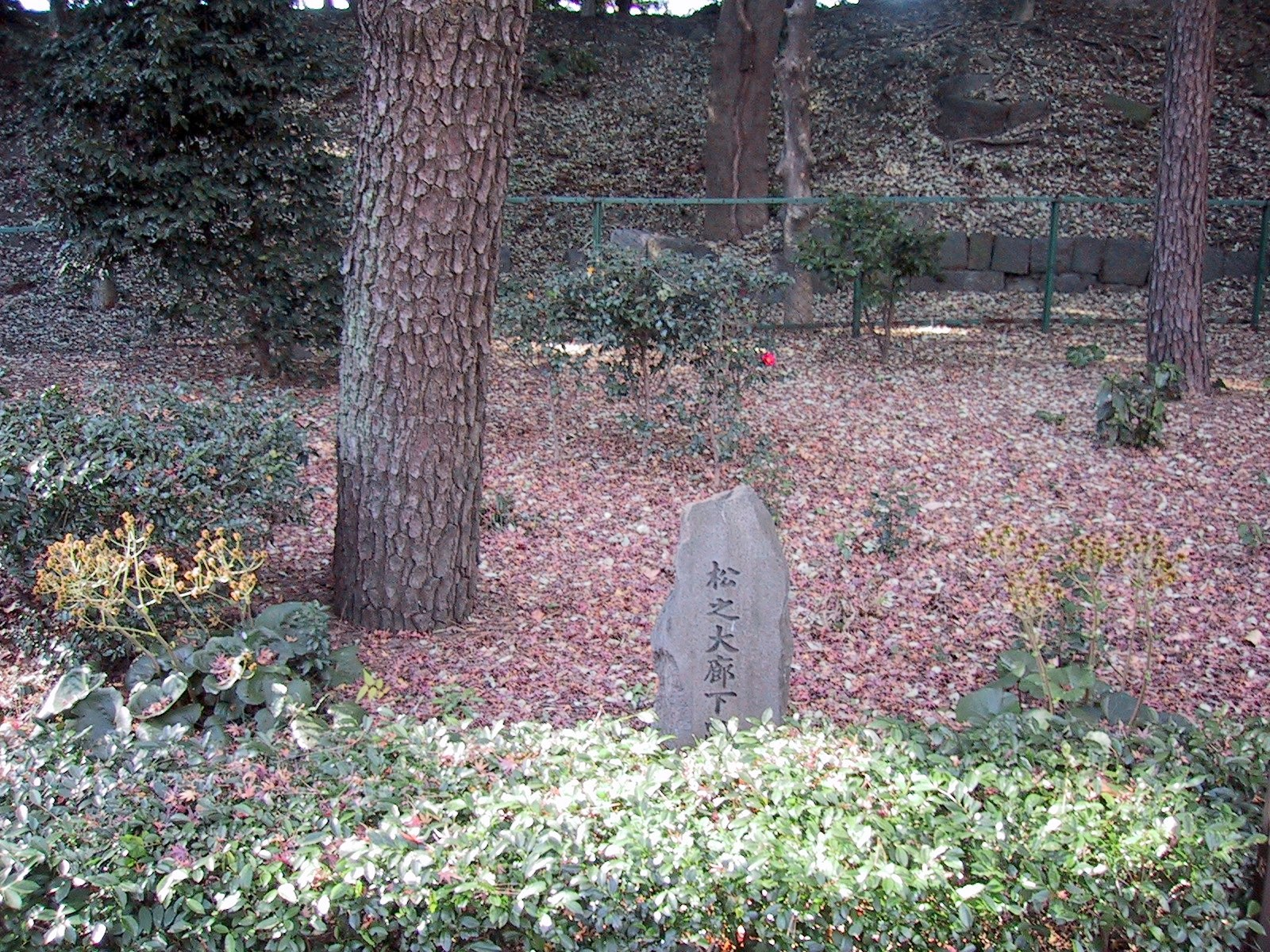
Memorial stone marking the site of the Matsu no Ōrōka (Great Corridor of Pines) in Edo Castle, where Asano attacked Kira

In 1701, two daimyō, Asano Takumi-no-Kami Naganori, the young daimyō of the Akō Domain (a small fiefdom in western Honshū), and Lord Kamei Korechika of the Tsuwano Domain, were ordered to arrange a fitting reception for the envoys of Emperor Higashiyama at Edo Castle, during their sankin-kōtai service to the shōgun.

Asano and Kamei were to be given instruction in the necessary court etiquette by Kira Kozuke-no-Suke Yoshinaka, a powerful official in the hierarchy of Tokugawa Tsunayoshi's shogunate. He allegedly became upset at them, either because of the insufficient presents they offered him (in the time-honored compensation for such an instructor), or because they would not offer bribes as he wanted. Other sources say that he was naturally rude and arrogant or that he was corrupt, which offended Asano, a devoutly moral Confucian. By some accounts, it also appears that Asano was unfamiliar with the intricacies of the shogunate court and failed to show the proper amount of deference to Kira. Whether Kira treated them poorly, insulted them, or failed to prepare them for fulfilling specific bakufu duties, offence was taken.

Initially, Asano bore all this stoically, while Kamei became enraged and prepared to kill Kira to avenge the insults. However, Kamei's quick-thinking counselors averted disaster for their lord and clan (for all would have been punished if Kamei had killed Kira) by quietly giving Kira a large bribe; Kira thereupon began to treat Kamei nicely, which calmed Kamei.

However, Kira allegedly continued to treat Asano harshly because he was upset that the latter had not emulated his companion. Finally, Kira insulted Asano, calling him a country boor with no manners, and Asano could restrain himself no longer. At the Matsu no Ōrōka, the main grand corridor that interconnects the Shiro-shoin (白書院) and the Ōhiroma of the Honmaru Goten (本丸御殿) residence, Asano lost his temper and attacked Kira with a dagger, wounding him in the face with his first strike; his second missed and hit a pillar. Guards then quickly separated them.

Kira's wound was hardly serious, but the attack on a shogunate official within the boundaries of the shōgun's residence was considered a grave offence. Any kind of violence, even the drawing of a katana, was completely forbidden in Edo Castle. The daimyō of Akō had removed his dagger from its scabbard within Edo Castle, and for that offence, he was ordered to kill himself by seppuku. Asano's goods and lands were to be confiscated after his death, his family was to be ruined, and his retainers were to be made rōnin (leaderless).

This news was carried to Ōishi Kuranosuke Yoshio, Asano's principal counsellor (karō). He took command and moved the Asano family away, as their castle was now forfeit. He persuaded the rest of his dead master's samurai retainers to peacefully comply with bakufu orders to surrender the castle to agents of the government.

According to contemporary records, Asano samurais had divided opinion upon whether to petition for a restoration of Asano family under Asano's younger brother, Asano Nagahiro, or to carry out the revenge directly. Ōishi initially prioritized the former. About 1 year later, Nagahiro was put under house arrest on August 11 1702, which effectively nullified Ōishi's hope, pushing him towards an assassination plan. Ōishi announced his final decision to storm the Kira house on a secret meeting on August 21. This decision prompted many to quit the plan. The number of remaining comrades kept decreasing until only 3 days before the scheduled attack, when only 47 men left.

In fictions, Ōishi began plotting revenge with his men immediately. Knowing that Kira would be vigilant against just such an attempt, Ōishi adopted a dissipated lifestyle to throw off suspicion. After two years, when Ōishi was convinced that Kira had let down his guard, and everything was ready, he fled from Kyoto, losing the spies who were watching him, and the entire band gathered at a secret meeting place in Edo to renew their oaths.

=== Attack ===
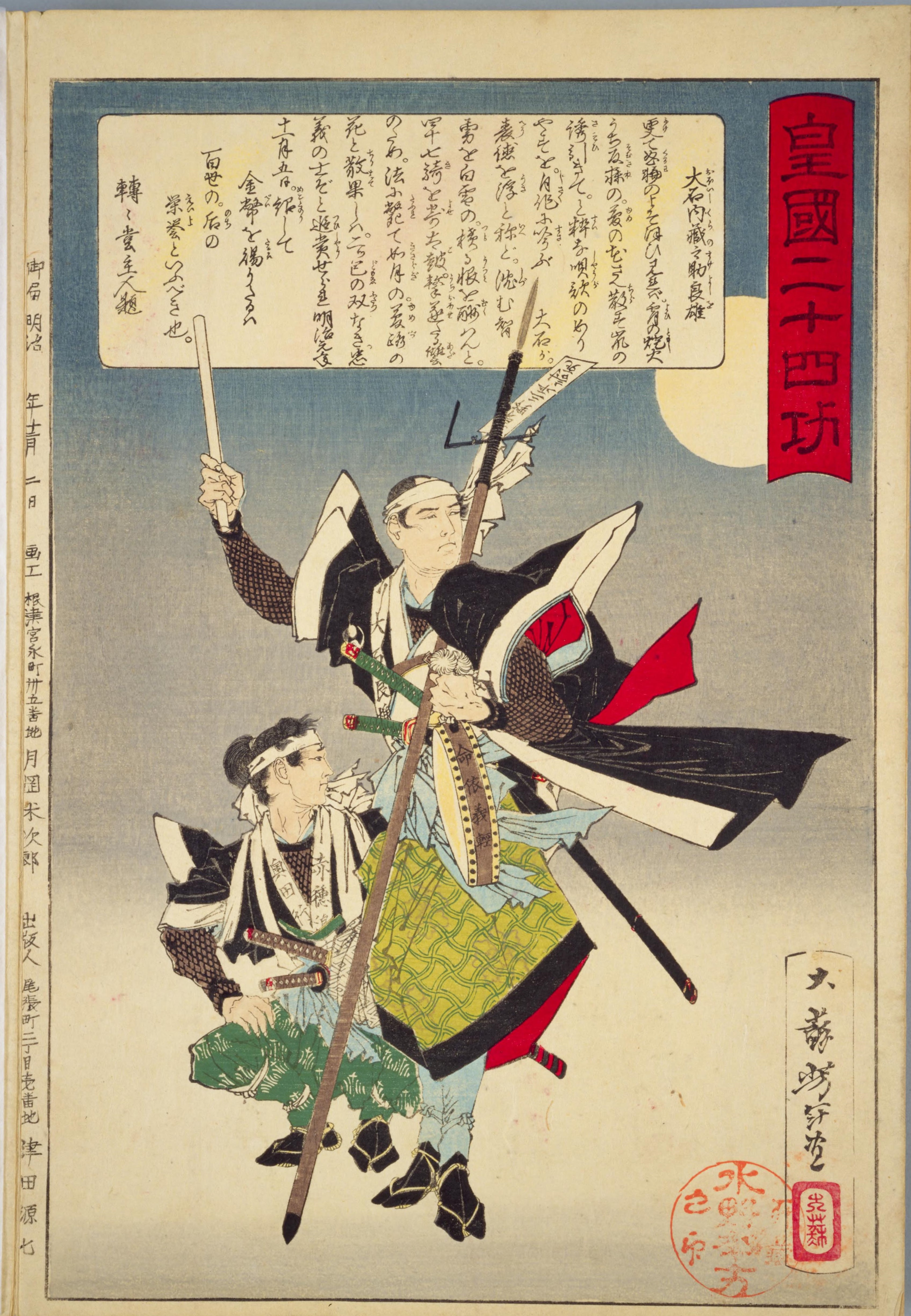
Ukiyo-e showing Ōishi signaling an attack by beating a drum. By Tsukioka Yoshitoshi.

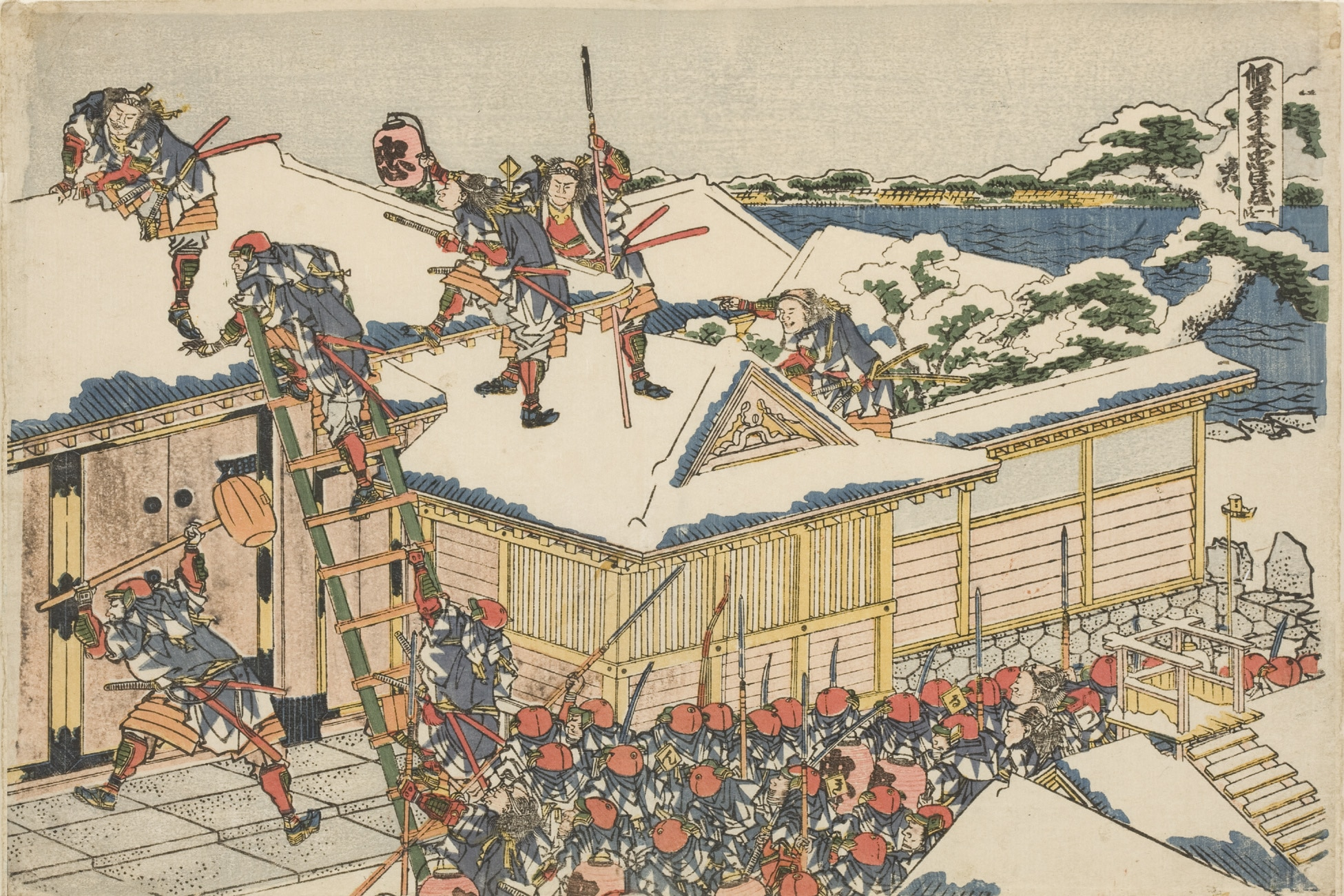
The rōnin attack the principal gate of Kira's mansion

On 31 January 1703, the rōnin stormed the residence of Kira Yoshinaka in Edo. According to a carefully laid-out plan, they split up into two groups and attacked, armed with swords and bows. One group, led by Ōishi, was to attack the front gate; the other, led by his son, Ōishi Chikara, was to attack the house via the back gate. A drum would sound the simultaneous attack, and a whistle would signal that Kira was dead.

Once Kira was dead, they planned to cut off his head and lay it as an offering on their master's tomb. They would then turn themselves in and wait for their expected sentence of death. All this had been confirmed at a final dinner, at which Ōishi asked them to be careful and spare women, children, and other helpless people.

Ōishi had four men scale the fence and enter the porter's lodge, capturing and tying up the guard. He then sent messengers to all the neighboring houses to explain that they were not robbers but retainers out to avenge the death of their master, and that no harm would come to anyone else. One of the rōnin climbed to the roof and loudly announced to the neighbors that the matter was an act of revenge (katakiuchi, 敵討ち). The neighbors, who all hated Kira, were relieved and did nothing to hinder the raiders.

After posting archers (some on the roof) to prevent those in the house (who had not yet awakened) from sending for help, Ōishi sounded the drum to signal the start the attack. Ten of Kira's retainers held off the party attacking the house from the front, but Ōishi Chikara's party broke into the back of the house.

Kira, in terror, took refuge in a closet in the veranda, along with his wife and female servants. The rest of his retainers, who slept in barracks outside, attempted to enter the house to rescue him. After overcoming the defenders at the front of the house, the two parties led by father and son joined up and fought the retainers who came in. The latter, perceiving that they were losing, tried to send for help, but their messengers were killed by the archers posted to prevent that.

Eventually, after a fierce struggle, the last of Kira's retainers were subdued; in the process, the rōnin killed 16 of Kira's men and wounded 22, including his grandson. Of Kira, however, there was no sign. They searched the house, but all they found were crying women and children. They began to despair, but Ōishi checked Kira's bed and found it was still warm, so he knew the man could not be far away.

=== Death of Kira ===
A renewed search found an entrance to a secret courtyard hidden behind a large scroll; the courtyard held a small building for storing charcoal and firewood, where two hidden armed retainers were overcome and killed. A search of the building revealed a hiding man; he attacked the searcher with a dagger, but the man was easily disarmed. He refused to say who he was, but the searchers felt sure it was Kira, and sounded the whistle. The rōnin gathered, and Ōishi, with a lantern, saw that it was indeed Kira—as a final proof, his head bore the scar from Asano's attack.

Ōishi went on his knees, and in consideration of Kira's high rank, respectfully addressed him, telling him they were retainers of Asano, come to avenge him as true samurai should, and inviting Kira to die as a true samurai should, by killing himself. Ōishi indicated he personally would act as a kaishakunin ("second", the one who beheads a person committing seppuku to spare them the indignity of a lingering death) and offered him the same dagger that Asano had used to kill himself. However, no matter how much they entreated him, Kira crouched, speechless and trembling. At last, seeing it was useless to continue asking, Ōishi ordered the other rōnin to pin him down, then cut off his head with the dagger. They then extinguished all the lamps and fires in the house (lest any cause the house to catch fire and start a general fire that would harm the neighbors) and left, taking Kira's head.

One of the rōnin, the ashigaru Terasaka Kichiemon, was ordered to travel to Akō and report that their revenge had been achieved. (Though Kichiemon's role as a messenger is the most widely accepted version of the story, other accounts have him running away before or after the battle, or being ordered to leave before the rōnin turned themselves in.)

=== Aftermath ===
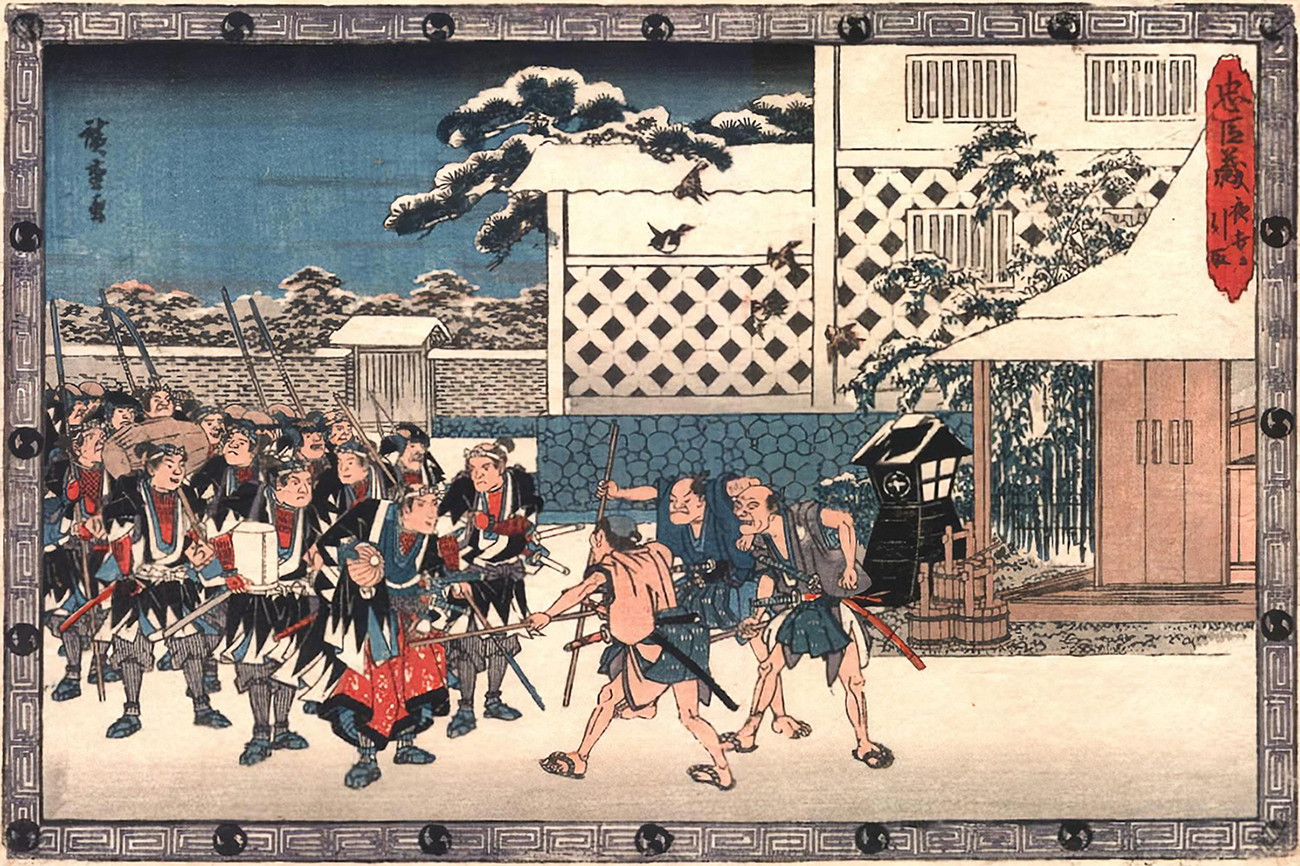
The rōnin, on their way back to Sengaku-ji, are halted in the street, and invited in for rest and refreshment.

As day was breaking, they quickly carried Kira's head from his residence to their lord's grave in Sengaku-ji temple, marching about ten kilometers across the city, causing a great stir on the way. The story of the revenge spread quickly, and everyone on their path praised them and offered them refreshment.

On arriving at the temple, the remaining 46 rōnin washed and cleaned Kira's head in a well, and laid it and the fateful dagger before Asano's tomb. They then offered prayers at the temple and gave the abbot of the temple all of the money they had left, asking him to bury them decently and offer prayers and requiems for them. They then turned themselves in; the group was split into four parts and placed under the guard of four different daimyō. During this time, two of Kira's friends came to collect his head for burial; the temple still has the original receipt for the head, which the friends and the priests who dealt with them had all signed.

The shogunate officials in Edo were in a quandary. The samurai had followed the precepts by avenging the death of their lord, but they had also defied the shogunate's authority by exacting revenge, which had been prohibited. In addition, the shōgun received a number of petitions from the admiring populace on behalf of the rōnin. As expected, the rōnin were sentenced to death for the murder of Kira, but the shōgun finally resolved the quandary by ordering them to honorably commit seppuku instead of having them executed as criminals. Each man ended his life in ritualistic fashion. Ōishi Chikara, the youngest, was only 15 years old on the day the raid took place, and 16 the day he committed seppuku.

Each of the 46 rōnin killed himself in Genroku 16, on the 4th day of the 2nd month (元禄十六年二月四日; 20 March 1703). This has caused a considerable amount of confusion ever since, with some people referring to the "forty-six rōnin"; this refers to the group put to death by the shōgun, while the actual attack party numbered forty-seven. The forty-seventh rōnin, Terasaka Kichiemon, eventually returned from his mission and was pardoned by the shōgun (some say on account of his youth). He lived until the age of 87, dying around 1747, and was then buried with his comrades. Their bodies were subsequently interred on the grounds of Sengaku-ji, in front of the tomb of their master. The clothes and arms they wore are still preserved in the temple to this day, along with the drum and whistle; their armor was all home-made, as they had not wanted to arouse suspicion by purchasing any.

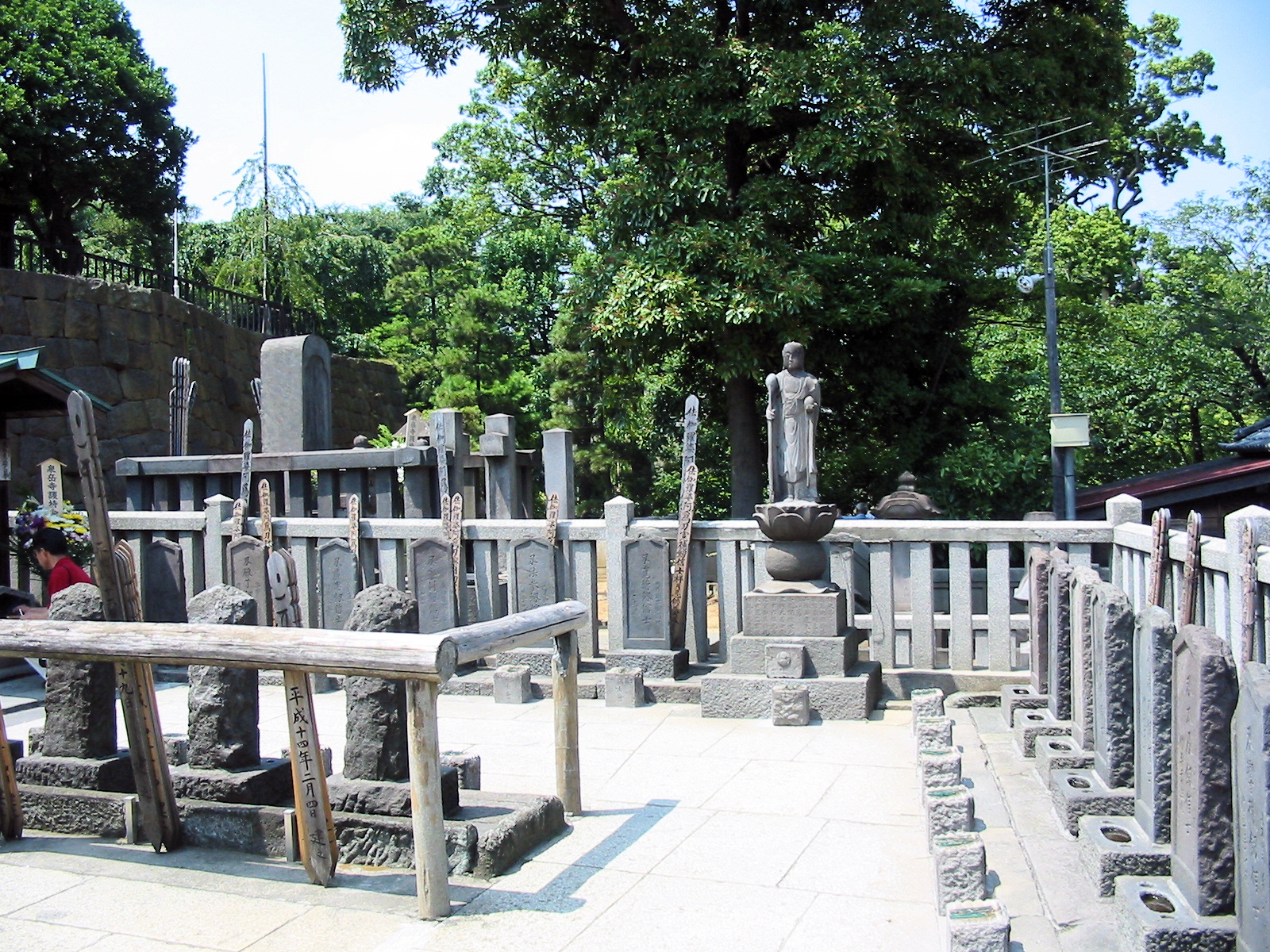
Graves of the forty-seven rōnin at Sengaku-ji

The tombs at Sengaku-ji became a place of great veneration, and people flocked there to pray. The graves have been visited by a great many people since the Genroku era.

=== Members ===
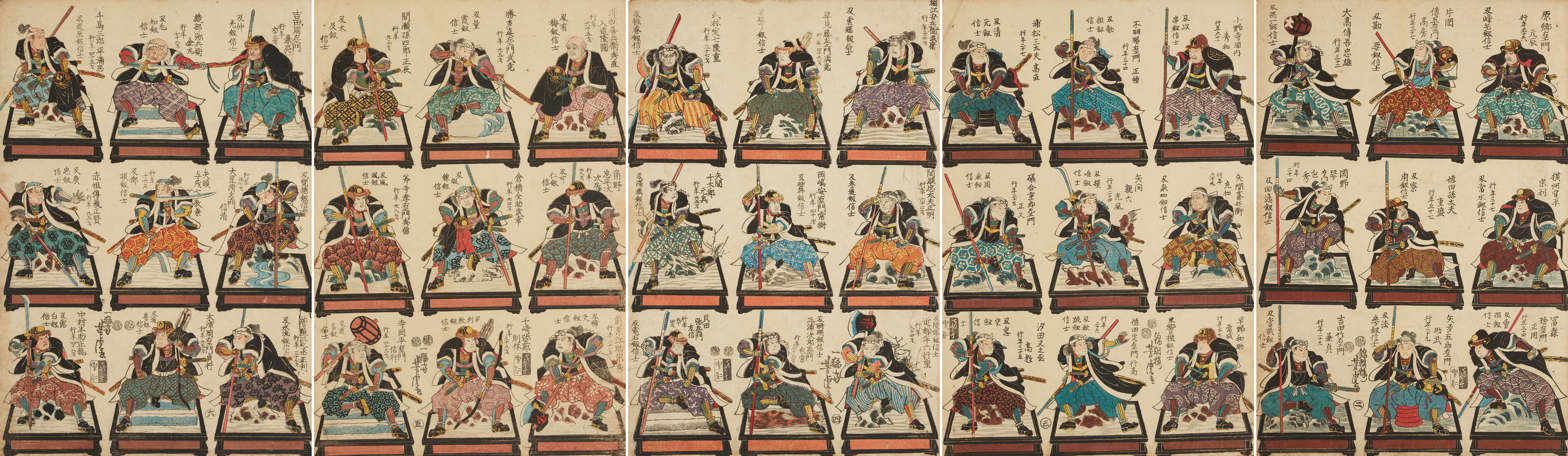
47 Ronin portraits by Utagawa Yoshitora

Below are the names of the 47 rōnin in the following form: family name – pseudonym (kemyō) – real name (imina). Alternative readings are listed in italics.

1. Ōishi Kuranosuke Yoshio/Yoshitaka (大石 内蔵助 良雄)
2. Ōishi Chikara Yoshikane (大石 主税 良金)
3. Hara Sōemon Mototoki (原 惣右衛門 元辰)
4. Kataoka Gengoemon Takafusa (片岡 源五右衛門 高房)
5. Horibe Yahei Kanamaru/Akizane (堀部 弥兵衛 金丸)
6. Horibe Yasubei Taketsune (堀部 安兵衛 武庸)
7. Yoshida Chūzaemon Kanesuke (吉田 忠左衛門 兼亮)
8. Yoshida Sawaemon Kanesada (吉田 沢右衛門 兼貞)
9. Chikamatsu Kanroku Yukishige (近松 勘六 行重)
10. Mase Kyūdayū Masaaki (間瀬 久太夫 正明)
11. Mase Magokurō Masatoki (間瀬 孫九郎 正辰)
12. Akabane Genzō Shigekata (赤埴 源蔵 重賢)
13. Ushioda Matanojō Takanori (潮田 又之丞 高教)
14. Tominomori Sukeemon Masayori (富森 助右衛門 正因)
15. Fuwa Kazuemon Masatane (不破 数右衛門 正種)
16. Okano Kin'emon Kanehide (岡野 金右衛門 包秀)
17. Onodera Jūnai Hidekazu (小野寺 十内 秀和)
18. Onodera Kōemon Hidetomi (小野寺 幸右衛門 秀富)
19. Kimura Okaemon Sadayuki (木村 岡右衛門 貞行)
20. Okuda Magodayū Shigemori (奥田 孫太夫 重盛)
21. Okuda Sadaemon Yukitaka (奥田 貞右衛門 行高)
22. Hayami Tōzaemon Mitsutaka (早水 藤左衛門 満尭)
23. Yada Gorōemon Suketake (矢田 五郎右衛門 助武)
24. Ōishi Sezaemon Nobukiyo (大石 瀬左衛門 信清)
25. Isogai Jūrōzaemon Masahisa (礒貝 十郎左衛門 正久)
26. Hazama Kihei Mitsunobu (間 喜兵衛 光延)
27. Hazama Jūjirō Mitsuoki (間 十次郎 光興)
28. Hazama Shinrokurō Mitsukaze (間 新六郎 光風)
29. Nakamura Kansuke Masatoki (中村 勘助 正辰)
30. Senba Saburobei Mitsutada (千馬 三郎兵衛 光忠)
31. Sugaya Hannojō Masatoshi (菅谷 半之丞 政利)
32. Muramatsu Kihei Hidenao (村松 喜兵衛 秀直)
33. Muramatsu Sandayū Takanao (村松 三太夫 高直)
34. Kurahashi Densuke Takeyuki (倉橋 伝助 武幸)
35. Okajima Yasoemon Tsuneshige (岡島 八十右衛門 常樹)
36. Ōtaka Gengo Tadao/Tadatake (大高 源五 忠雄)
37. Yatō Emoshichi Norikane (矢頭 右衛門七 教兼)
38. Katsuta Shinzaemon Taketaka (勝田 新左衛門 武尭)
39. Takebayashi Tadashichi Takashige (武林 唯七 隆重)
40. Maebara Isuke Munefusa (前原 伊助 宗房)
41. Kaiga Yazaemon Tomonobu (貝賀 弥左衛門 友信)
42. Sugino Jūheiji Tsugifusa (杉野 十平次 次房)
43. Kanzaki Yogorō Noriyasu (神崎 与五郎 則休)
44. Mimura Jirōzaemon Kanetsune (三村 次郎左衛門 包常)
45. Yakokawa Kanbei Munetoshi (横川 勘平 宗利)
46. Kayano Wasuke Tsunenari (茅野 和助 常成)
47. Terasaka Kichiemon Nobuyuki (寺坂 吉右衛門 信行)

== Criticism ==
The rōnin spent more than 14 months waiting for the "right time" for their revenge. It was Yamamoto Tsunetomo, author of the Hagakure, who asked the well known question: "What if, nine months after Asano's death, Kira had died of an illness?" His answer was that the forty-seven rōnin would have lost their only chance at avenging their master. Even if they had claimed, then, that their dissipated behavior was just an act, that in just a little more time they would have been ready for revenge, who would have believed them? They would have been forever remembered as cowards and drunkards—bringing eternal shame to the name of the Asano clan. The right thing for the rōnin to do, writes Yamamoto, was to attack Kira and his men immediately after Asano's death. The rōnin would probably have suffered defeat, as Kira was ready for an attack at that time—but this was unimportant.

Ōishi was too obsessed with success, according to Yamamoto. He conceived his convoluted plan to ensure that they would succeed at killing Kira, which is not a proper concern in a samurai: the important thing was not the death of Kira, but for the former samurai of Asano to show outstanding courage and determination in an all-out attack against the Kira house, thus winning everlasting honor for their dead master. Even if they had failed to kill Kira, even if they had all perished, it would not have mattered, as victory and defeat have no importance. By waiting a year, they improved their chances of success but risked dishonoring the name of their clan, the worst sin a samurai can commit.

== In the arts ==
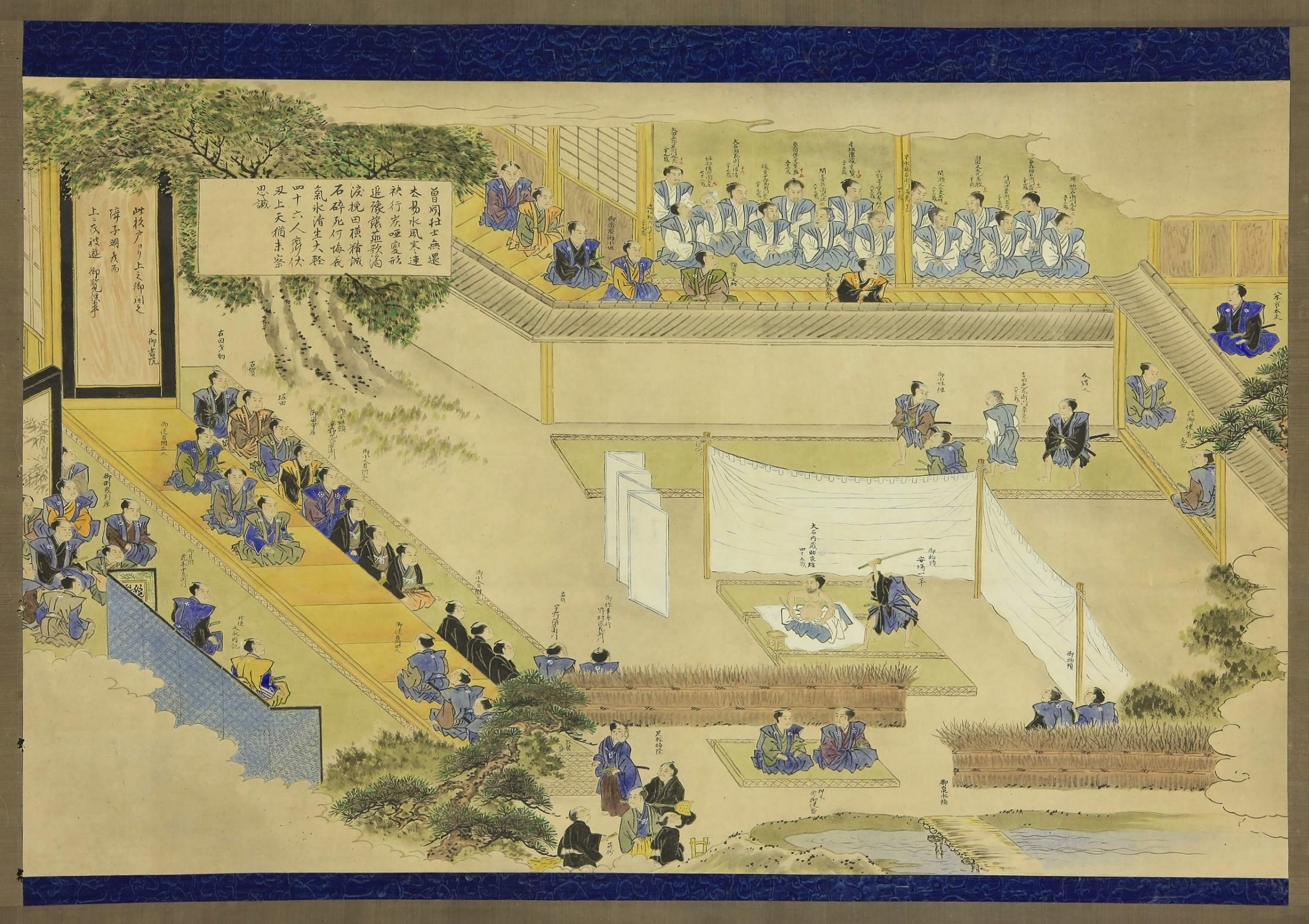
Painting of Ōishi Yoshio committing seppuku

The tragedy of the forty-seven rōnin has been one of the most popular themes in Japanese art and has lately even begun to make its way into Western art.

Immediately following the event, there were mixed feelings among the intelligentsia about whether such vengeance had been appropriate. Many agreed that, given their master's last wishes, the rōnin had done the right thing, but were undecided about whether such a vengeful wish was proper. Over time, however, the story became a symbol of loyalty to one's master and later, of loyalty to the emperor. Once this happened, the story flourished as a subject of drama, storytelling, and visual art.

=== Plays ===
The incident immediately inspired a succession of kabuki and bunraku plays; the first, The Night Attack at Dawn by the Soga, appeared only two weeks after the ronin died. It was shut down by the authorities, but many others soon followed, initially in Osaka and Kyoto, farther away from the shogunal capital. Some even took the story as far as Manila, to spread the story to the rest of Asia.

The most successful of the adaptations was a bunraku puppet play called Kanadehon Chūshingura (now simply called Chūshingura, or "Treasury of Loyal Retainers"), written in 1748 by Takeda Izumo and two associates; it was later adapted into a kabuki play, which is still one of Japan's most popular.

In the play, to avoid the attention of the censors, the events are transferred into the distant past, to the 14th century reign of shōgun Ashikaga Takauji. Asano became En'ya Hangan Takasada, Kira became Kō no Moronao and Ōishi became Ōboshi Yuranosuke Yoshio; the names of the rest of the rōnin were disguised to varying degrees. The play contains a number of plot twists that do not reflect the real story: Moronao tries to seduce En'ya's wife, and one of the rōnin dies before the attack because of a conflict between family and warrior loyalty (another possible cause of the confusion between forty-six and forty-seven).

=== Opera ===
The story was turned into an opera, Chūshingura, by Shigeaki Saegusa in 1997.

=== Cinema and television ===
The play has been made into a movie at least six times in Japan, the earliest starring Onoe Matsunosuke. The film's release date is questioned, but placed between 1910 and 1917. It has been aired on the Jidaigeki Senmon Channel (Japan) with accompanying benshi narration. In 1941, the Japanese military commissioned director Kenji Mizoguchi, who would later direct Ugetsu after the war, to make Genroku Chūshingura. They wanted a ferocious morale booster based on the familiar rekishi geki ("historical drama") of The Loyal 47 Ronin. Instead, Mizoguchi chose for his source Mayama Chūshingura, a cerebral play dealing with the story. The film was a commercial failure, having been released in Japan one week before the attack on Pearl Harbor. The Japanese military and most audiences found the first part to be too serious, but the studio and Mizoguchi both regarded it as so important that Part Two was put into production, despite lukewarm reception to Part One. The film wasn't shown in America until the 1970s.

The 1958 version, The Loyal 47 Ronin, was directed by Kunio Watanabe.

The 1962 film version directed by Hiroshi Inagaki, Chūshingura, is most familiar to Western audiences. In it, Toshirō Mifune appears in a supporting role as spearman Tawaraboshi Genba. Mifune was to revisit the story several times in his career. In 1971 he appeared in the 52-part television series Daichūshingura as Ōishi, while in 1978 he appeared as Lord Tsuchiya in the epic Swords of Vengeance (Akō-jō danzetsu).

Many Japanese television shows, including single programs, short series, single seasons, and even year-long series such as Daichūshingura and the more recent NHK Taiga drama Genroku Ryōran, recount the events. Among both films and television programs, some are quite faithful to the Chūshingura, while others incorporate unrelated material or alter details. In addition, gaiden dramatize events and characters not in the Chūshingura. Kon Ichikawa directed another version in 1994. In 2004, Mitsumasa Saitō directed a nine-episode mini-series starring Ken Matsudaira, who had also starred in a 1999 49-episode TV series of the Chūshingura entitled Genroku Ryōran. In Hirokazu Koreeda's 2006 film Hana yori mo nao, the story was used as a backdrop, with one of the ronin being a neighbor of the protagonists.

In the 1998 film Ronin, Robert De Niro's character is told the story by a mysterious Frenchman who is creating an intricately detailed miniature diorama of its original setting. Though the film takes the name from the 'masterless' samurai of Japan, it has nothing to do with the actual events of the forty-seven ronin.

A comedic adaptation was presented in a 2002 episode of the Canadian television series History Bites titled "Samurai Goodfellas", mingling the story with elements from The Godfather film series.

Most recently, it was made into a 2013 American movie titled 47 Ronin, starring Keanu Reeves, and then again into a more stylized 2015 version titled Last Knights.

=== Woodblock prints ===
The forty-seven rōnin is one of the most popular themes in Japanese woodblock prints, or ukiyo-e and many well-known artists have made prints portraying either the original events, scenes from the play, or the actors. One book on subjects depicted in woodblock prints devotes no fewer than seven chapters to the history of the appearance of this theme in woodblocks. Among the artists who produced prints on this subject are Utamaro, Toyokuni, Hokusai, Kunisada, Hiroshige, and Yoshitoshi. However, probably the most widely known woodblocks in the genre are those of Kuniyoshi, who produced at least eleven separate complete series on this subject, along with more than twenty triptychs.

=== Literature ===
- The earliest known account of the Akō incident in the West was published in 1822 in Isaac Titsingh's posthumously-published book Illustrations of Japan.
- The first book of the juvenile Samurai Mystery series by Dorothy and Thomas Hoobler, The Ghost in the Tokaido Inn (2005), weaves the kabuki play The Forty-Seven Ronin into the plot.
- The incident is the subject of Jorge Luis Borges' short story "The Uncivil Teacher of Court Etiquette Kôtsuké no Suké", included in the 1935 collection A Universal History of Infamy.
- The legend of the forty-seven rōnin was adapted into two graphic novels published by Dark Horse Comics. The first is 47 Ronin, a 2014 faithful retelling written by Mike Richardson and illustrated by Stan Sakai. The second Dark Horse Comics adaption is Seppuku, the second part of Víctor Santos' 2017 graphic novel Rashomon: A Commissioner Heigo Kobayashi Case, which also adapts "In a Grove", the Ryūnosuke Akutagawa short story the 1950 film Rashomon is based on.

== Gallery ==
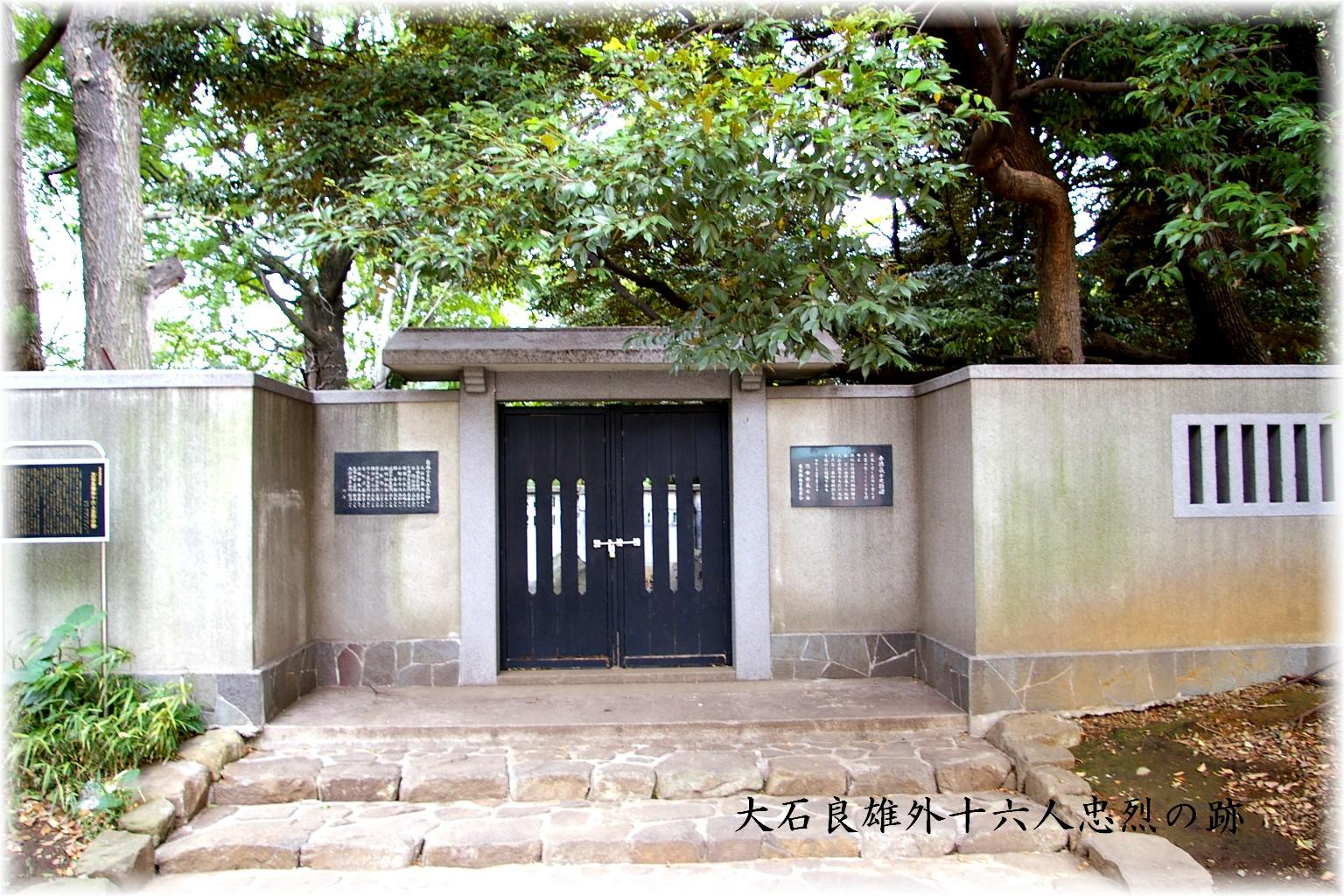
Memorial to the unswerving loyalty of Ōishi Yoshio and the others, at the site where they died

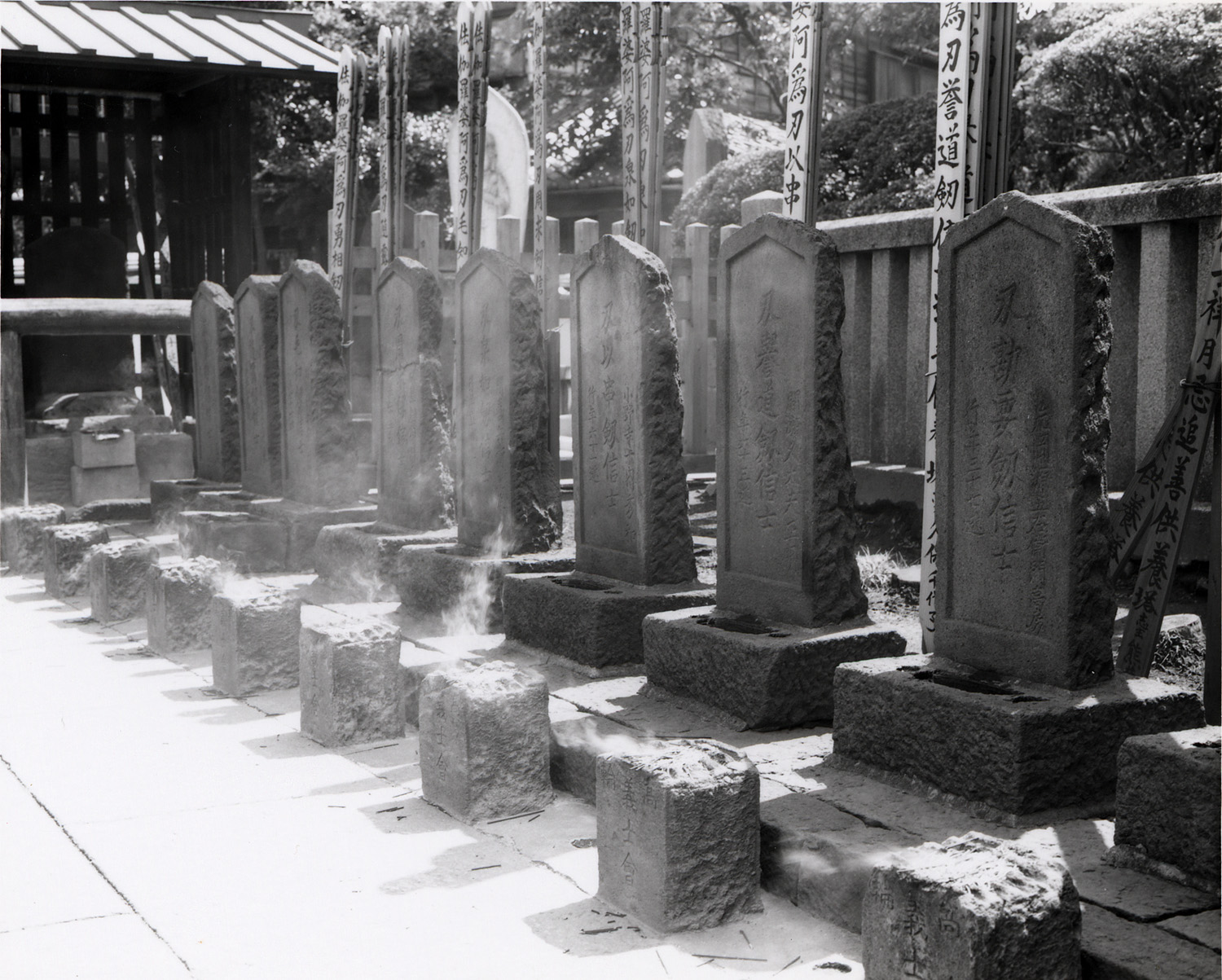
Incense burns at the graves of the forty-seven rōnin at Sengaku-ji

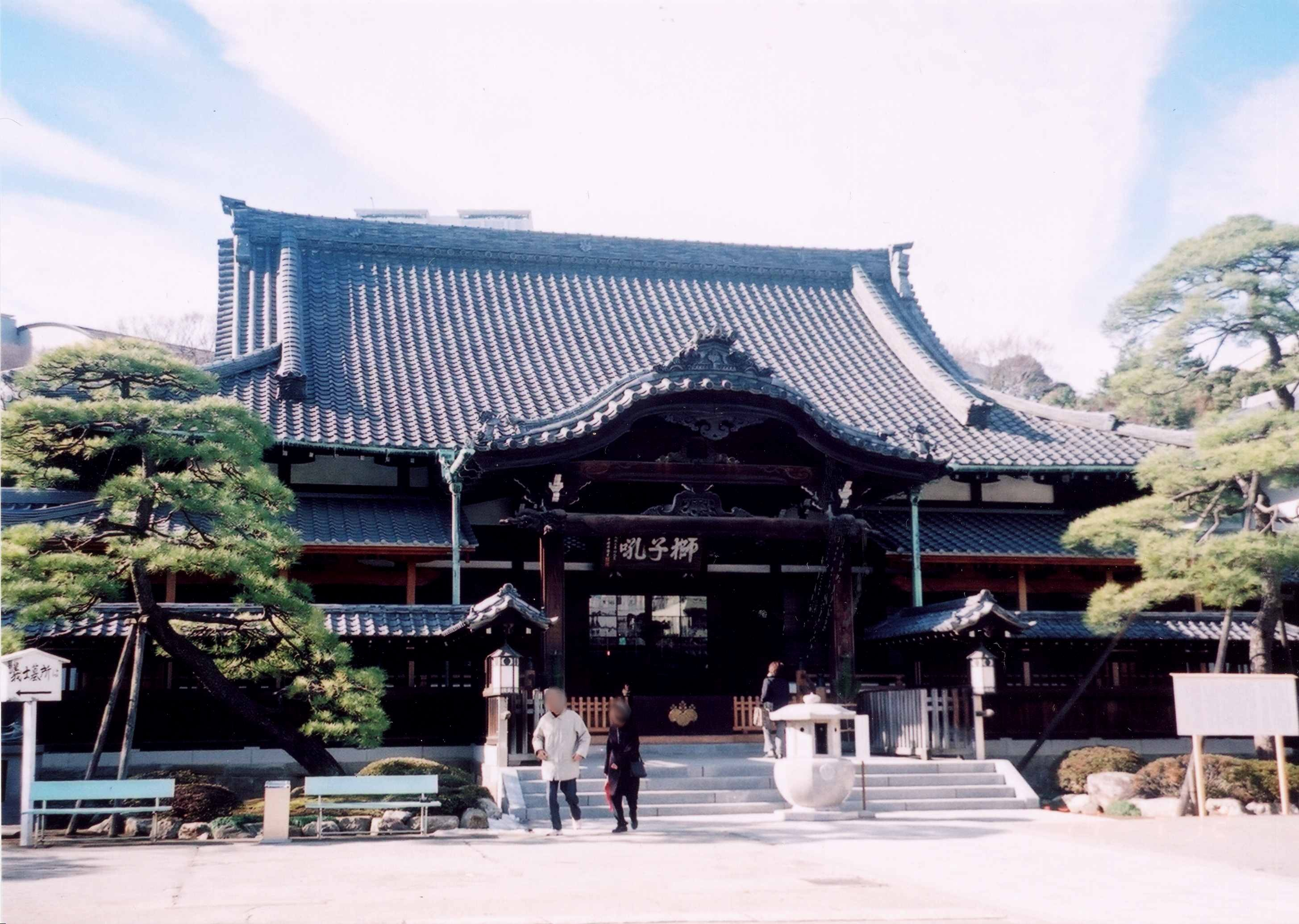
Entrance to Sengaku Temple

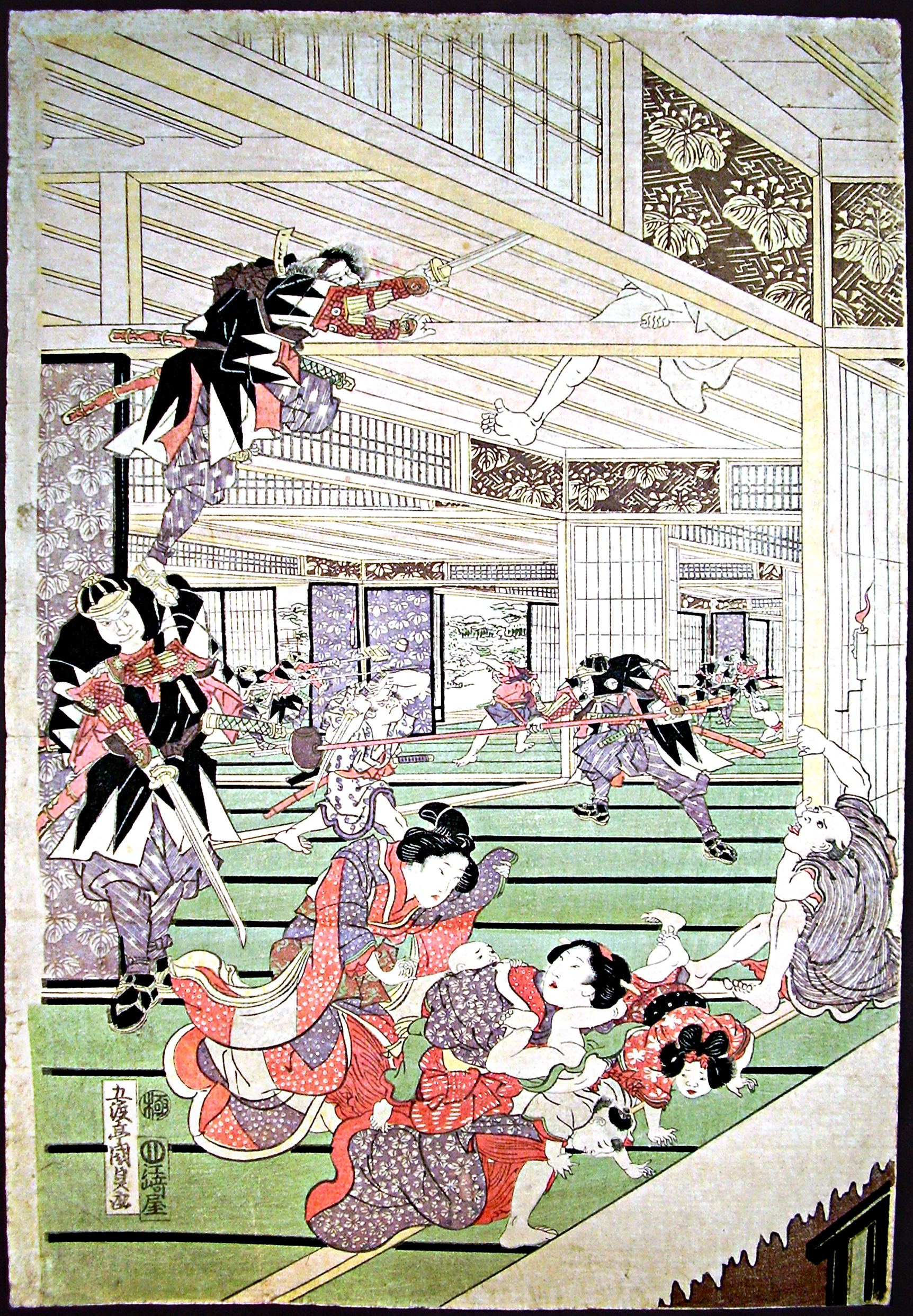
Woodcut by Kunisada depicting the attack (early 1800s)

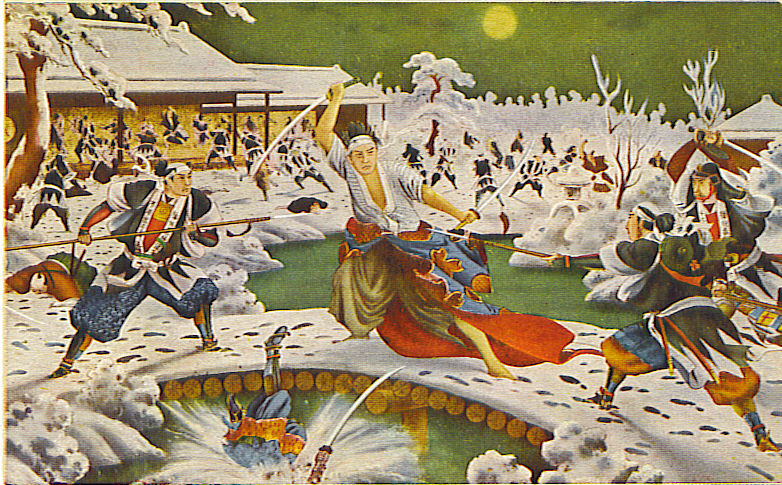
Postcard depicting the attack, early 1920s

== See also ==
- History of Tokyo
- Japanese mythology
