= Ōishi Yoshio =

High-rank samurai official (1659–1703)

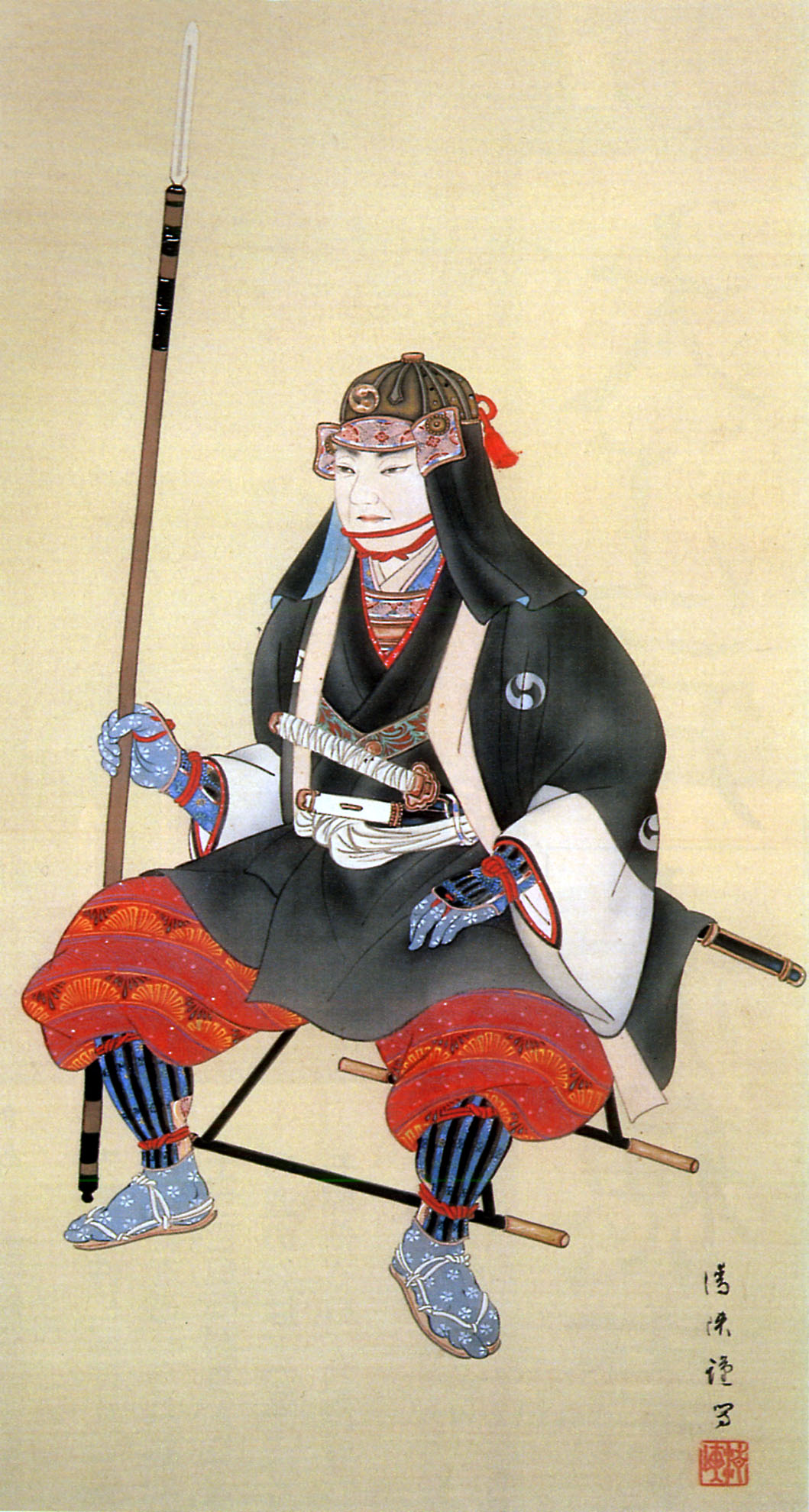
Portrait painting of Ōishi Yoshio.

Ōishi Yoshio (大石 良雄; 24 April 1659 – 20 March 1703) was the chamberlain (karō) of the Akō Domain in Harima Province (now Hyōgo Prefecture), Japan (1679 - 1701). He is known as the leader of the Forty-seven Rōnin in their 1703 vendetta and thus the hero of the Chūshingura. He is often referred to by his pseudonym, Ōishi Kuranosuke (大石内蔵助; Japanese pronunciation: [oꜜː.i.ɕi̥ kɯ.ɾa.no.sɯ̥.ke]).

== Biography ==
He served daimyō Asano Naganori as the head chamberlain (hittōgarō (筆頭家老)) for the Akō estate, supervising the daily running of the castle and the samurai. Due to the Tokugawa rules which required all the daimyō to spend every other year in Edo (now called Tokyo) the chamberlain was a very important man and the de facto ruler of the estate when the daimyō was away from his home province. Having attained this office at a rather young age, he is said to have had the implicit trust of his lord.

When Asano committed seppuku as punishment for his failed attempt to kill Kira Yoshinaka in Edo castle and the Tokugawa shogunate abolished the house of Asano of Akō, Ōishi was in Akō and managed all its administrative issues. He persuaded other samurai to peacefully yield control of the castle to the agents of the Shogunate. During the next two years many people wondered what Ōishi would do as he had a reputation as an honourable and capable man.

He attempted to get the permission to re-establish the house of Asano of Akō but failed. He then began a careful plot to kill Lord Kira, but to throw off suspicion, first spent time (and money) in the geisha houses of Kyoto. This type of ruse is referred to as hiru andon (昼行灯, daylight lantern) – appearing to be serving no useful purposes, and this term is frequently applied to Ōishi. He carried out his role well – and secretly coordinated the movements of the remaining loyal Asano samurai. Nearly two years passed before the attack was launched.

In January 1703 (by the old Japanese calendar, the 12th month, 14th day) he, with 46 other Akō rōnin, attacked Kira at his residence in the Honjo neighborhood of Edo. Kira was killed and decapitated. After Ōishi dispatched Terasaka Kichiemon to inform Asano's widow Yōzeiin of the deed, he and the remaining 45 rōnin went to Sengaku-ji in Shinagawa where Naganori was buried and there they were arrested.

He and the other rōnin were ordered to commit seppuku. Since it was an honourable sentence rather than merely decapitation, everyone accepted this sentence as an honour.

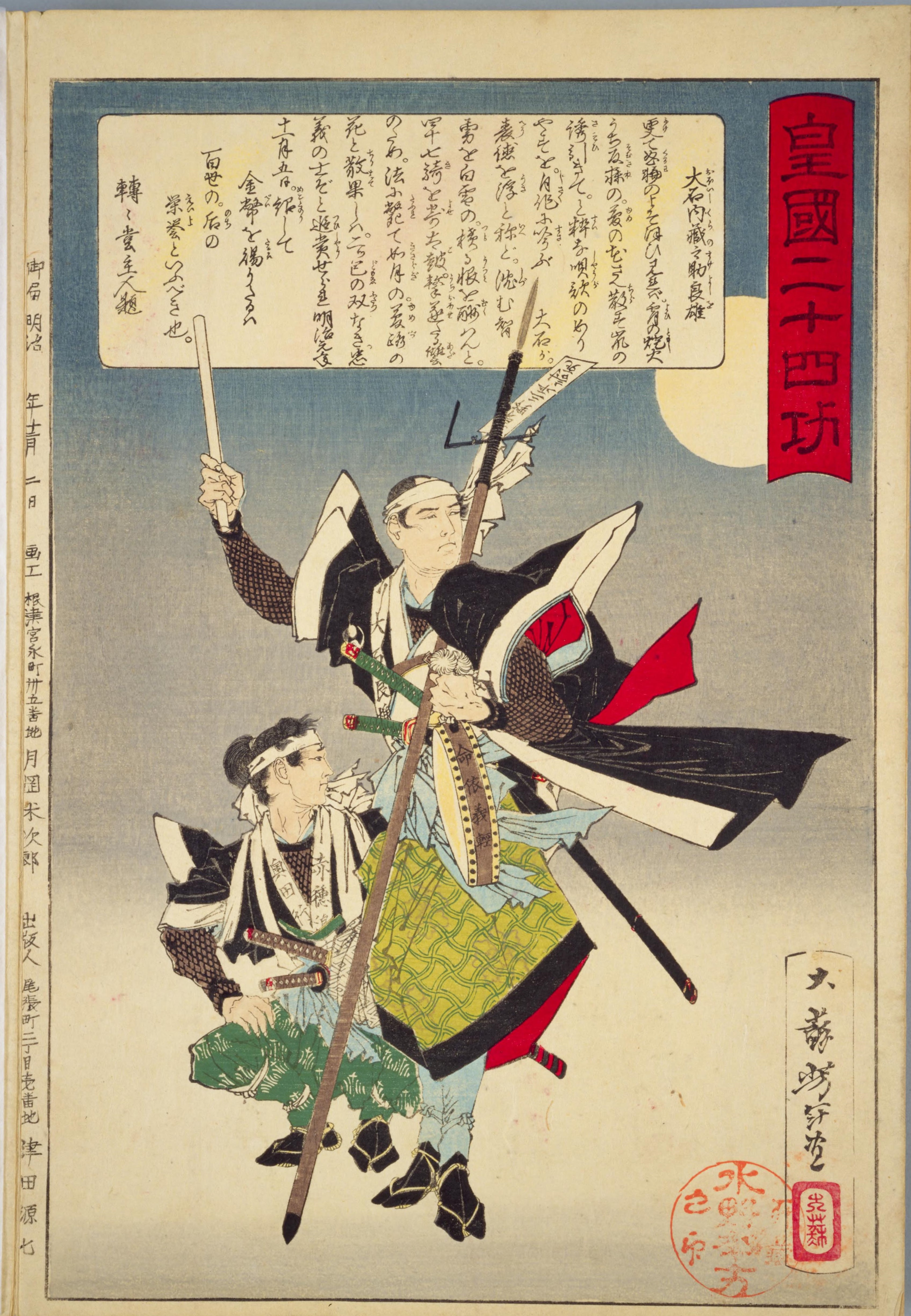
Ukiyo-e showing Ōishi signaling an attack by beating a drum. By Tsukioka Yoshitoshi.

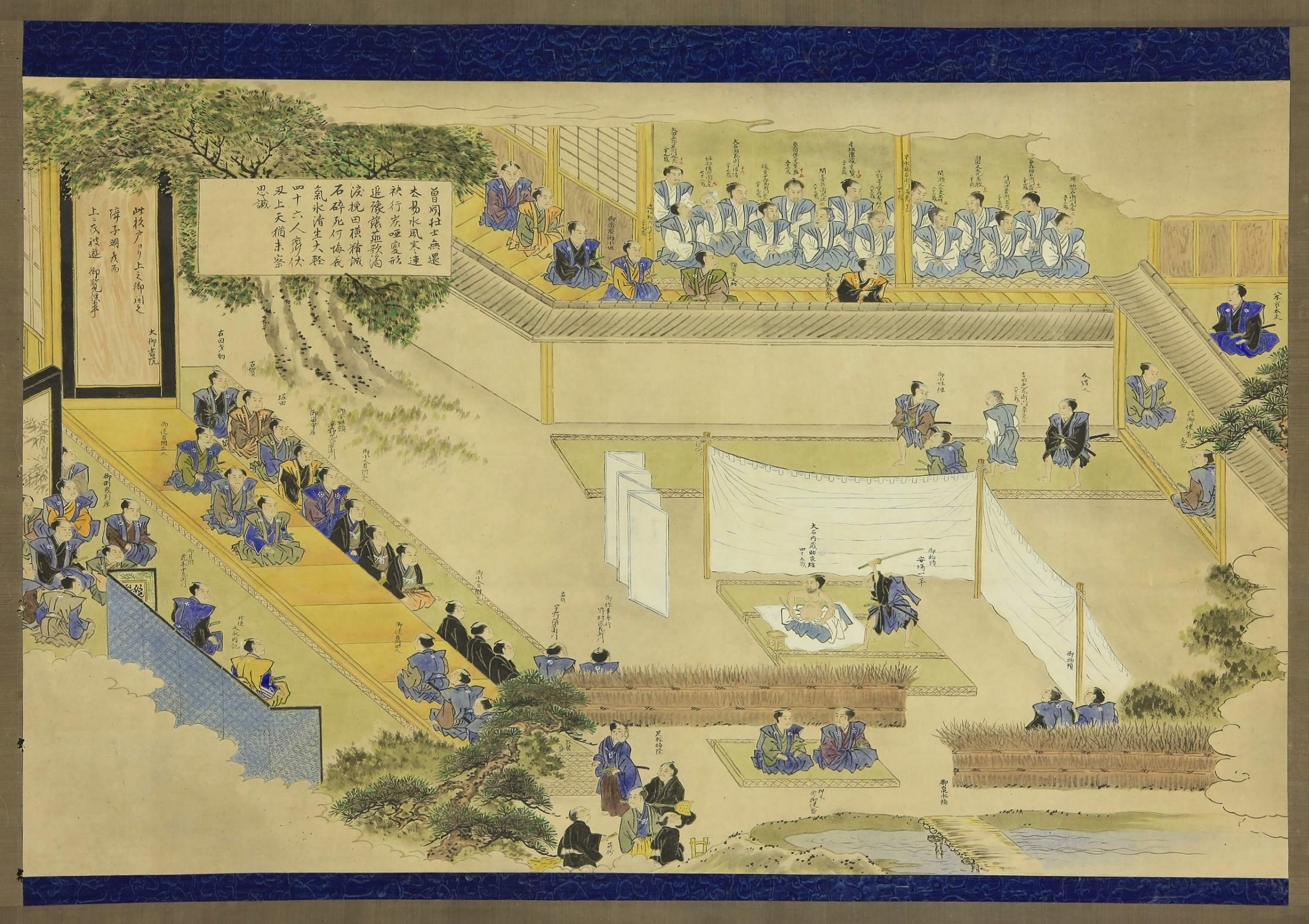
Painting of Ōishi Yoshio committing seppuku

== Legacy ==
After death, Ōishi became famous as the example of ideal samurai behavior. His ultimate goal of reestablishment of the Akō Asano clan was realized as the Tokugawa shogunate did restore some lands (about 1/10 of the original holdings) to the Asano clan.

In the famous kabuki play Kanadehon Chūshingura, Yoshio (Kuranosuke) is known as Ōboshi Yuranosuke.

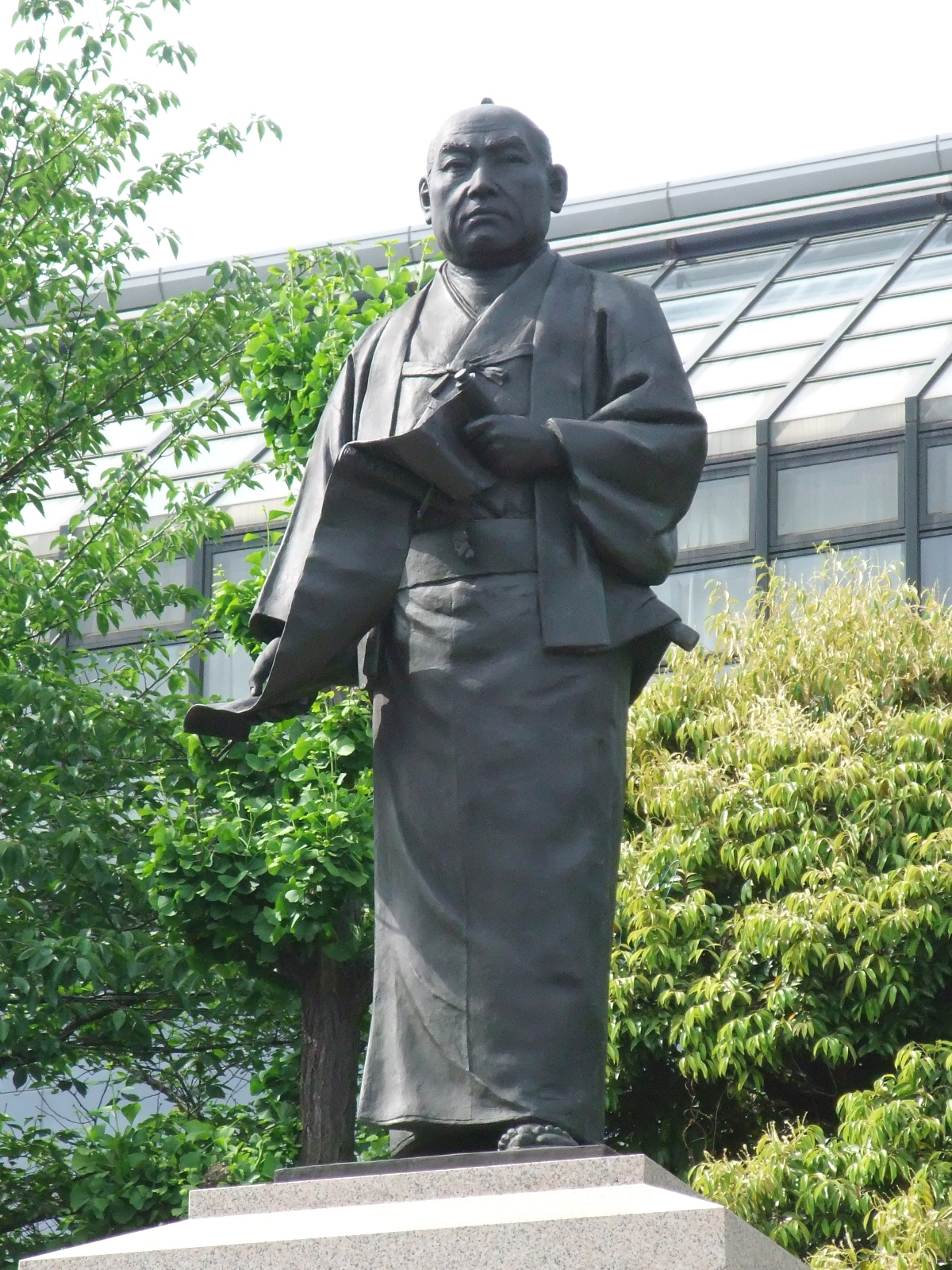
Statue of Ōishi Yoshio at Sengaku-ji in Tokyo

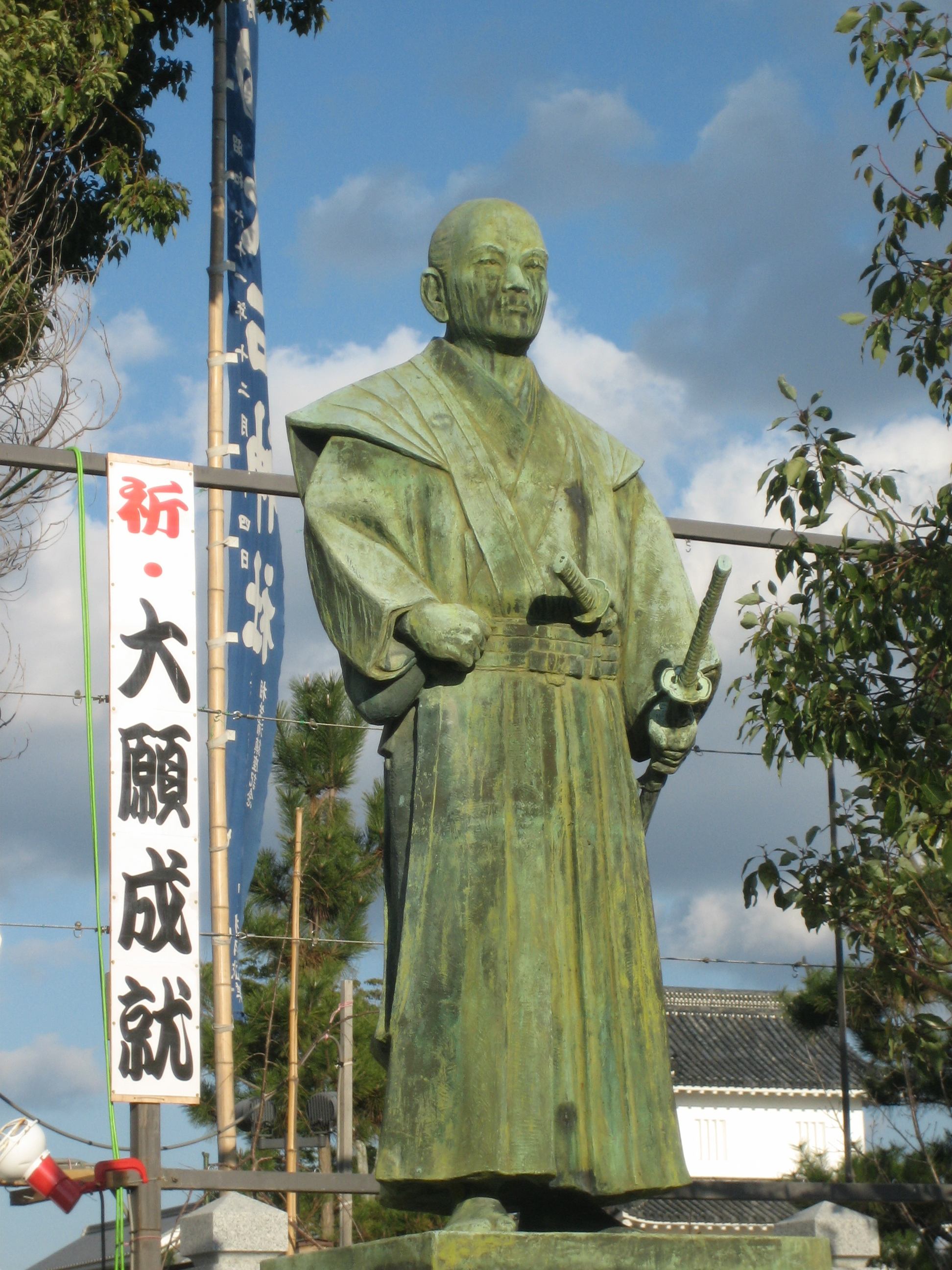
Statue of Ōishi Yoshio in a Shinto shrine Ako Oishi jinja (ja) in Akō, Hyōgo

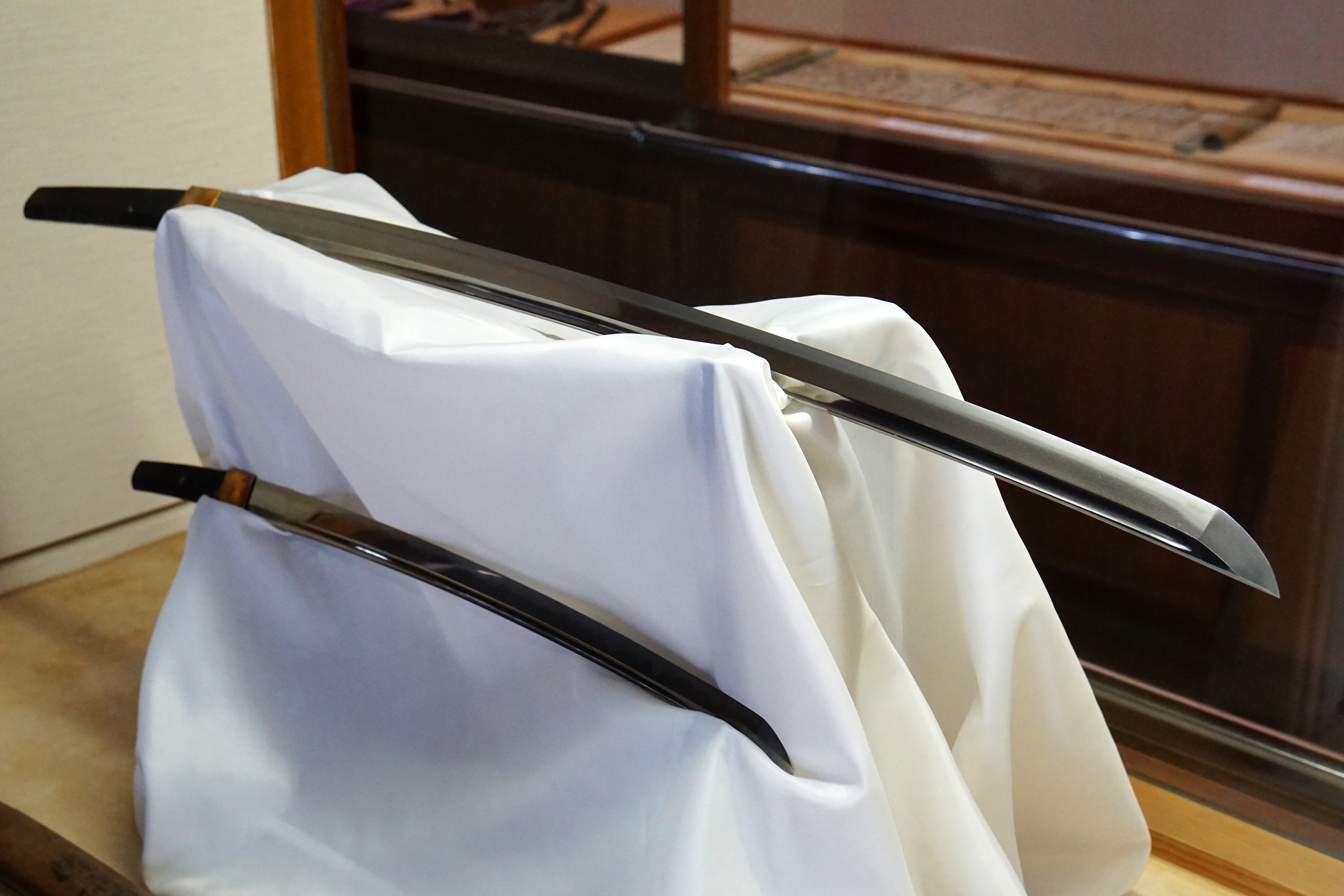
Katana and wakizashi (daishō) owned by Ōishi Yoshio. Ako Oishi jinja
