= Kira Yoshinaka =

Japanese kōke (1641–1703)

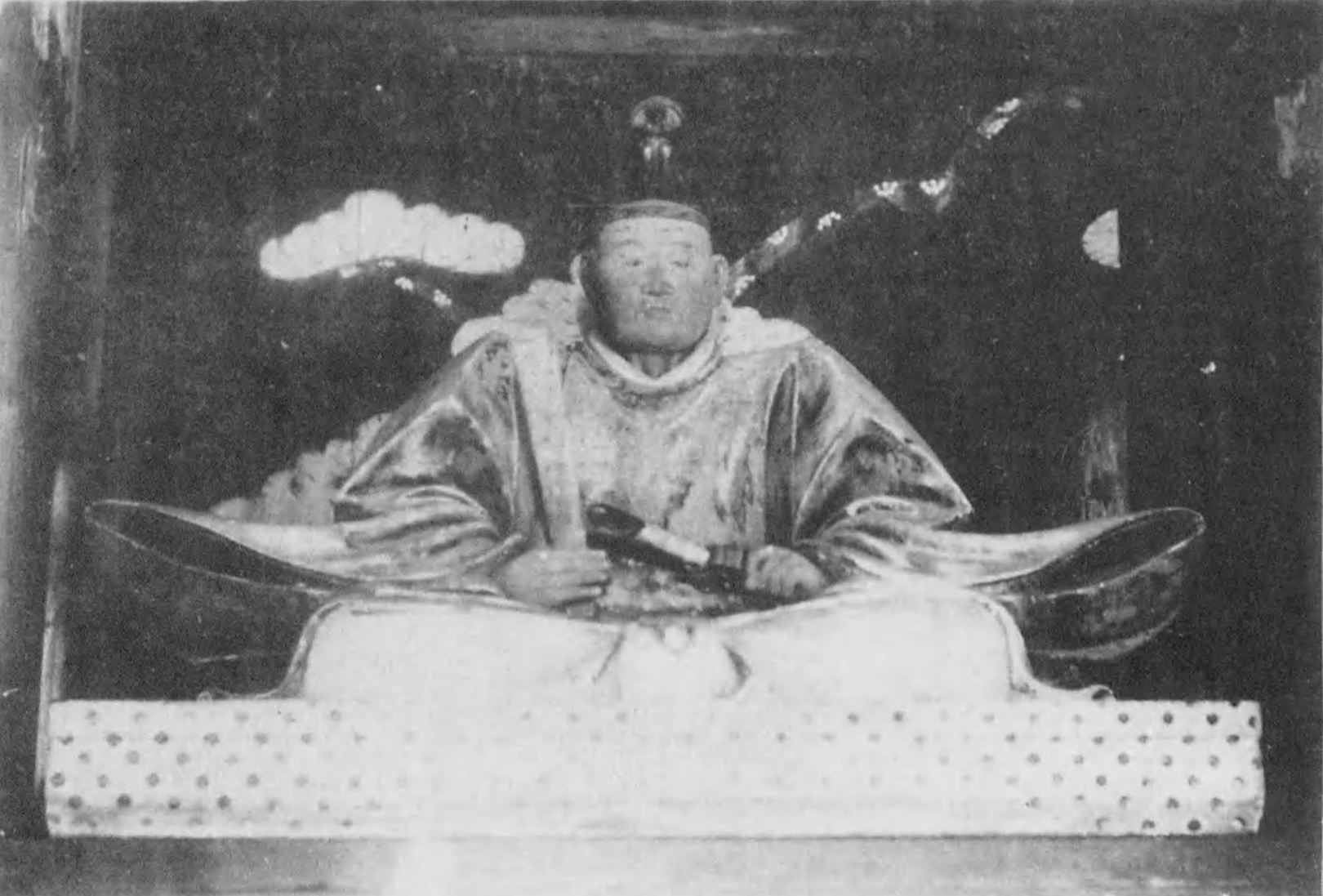
Wooden statue of Kira Yoshinaka

Kira Yoshinaka (吉良 義央) (October 5, 1641 – January 30, 1703) was a Japanese kōke (master of ceremonies). His court title was Kōzuke no suke (上野介). He is famous as the adversary of Asano Naganori in the events of the forty-seven rōnin. Although his name (義央) has been long read as "Yoshinaka" especially in dramas and novels, Ekisui Rembeiroku (易水連袂録), written by an anonymous contemporary in 1703, recorded that his name was "Yoshihisa".

== Life ==
=== Family and early life ===
Born in 1641, he was the eldest son of Kira Yoshifuyu of the Kira clan. His mother was a member of the high-ranking Sakai clan. On the death of his father in 1668, Kira became the 17th head of the household, inheriting lands evaluated at 4,200 koku. His wife was from the Uesugi clan, and his eldest son was adopted by Uesugi Tsunakatsu, the head of the Dewa Yonezawa han, taking the name Tsunanori. Kira named his second son as his heir, but when that son died, he adopted Tsunanori's second son, strengthening the connection between the Kira clan and the Uesugi.

=== Career ===
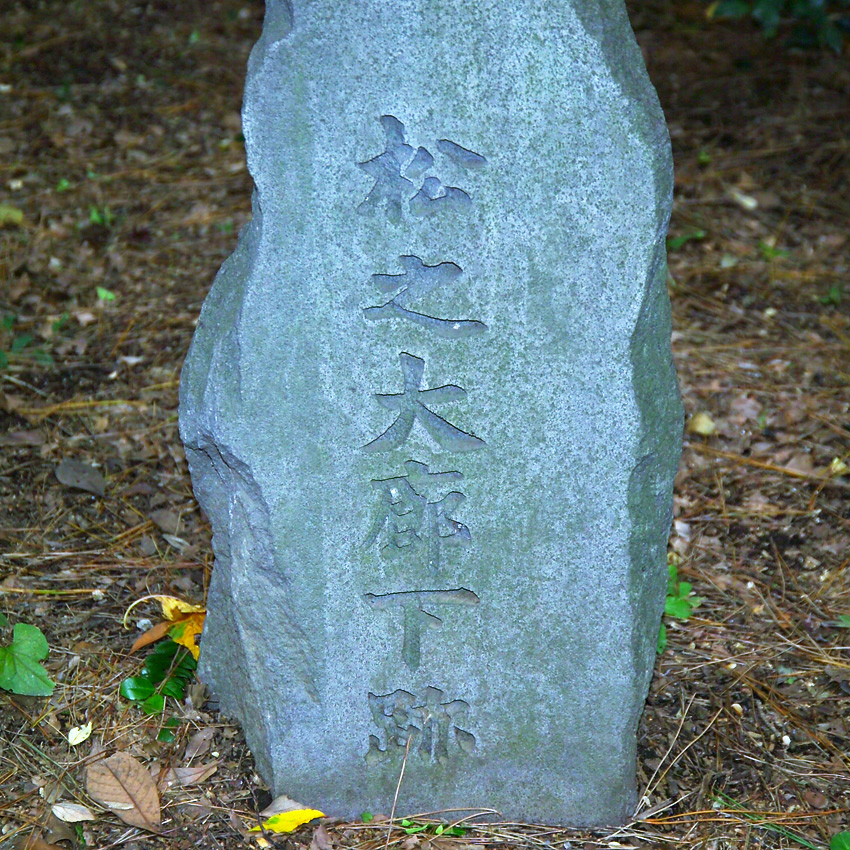
This monument marks the former location of the Great Corridor of Pines at Edo Castle, where Asano Naganori attempted to kill Kira Yoshinaka.

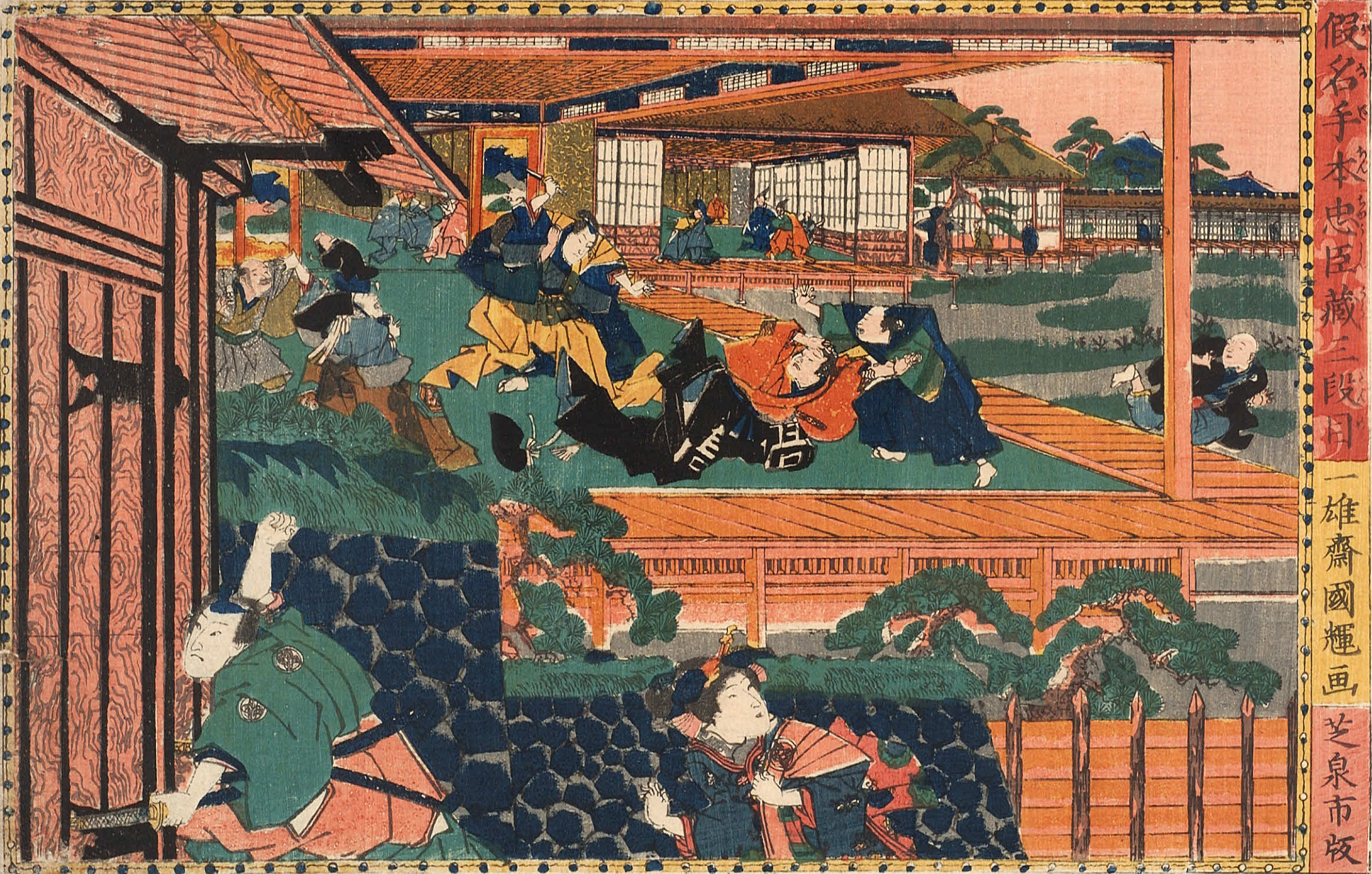
Ukiyo-e depicting the assault of Asano Naganori on Kira Yoshinaka in the Matsu no Ōrōka of Edo Castle, by Utagawa Kuniteru, late 19th century

As a kōke, Kira oversaw matters of protocol. In 1701, he was assigned the task of tutoring Asano Naganori in matters of protocol in preparation for an upcoming visit by representatives of the emperor. According to the stories, Kira was corrupt and demanded bribes for the tutoring, which Asano refused to pay. Kira then began to publicly insult Asano, calling him an ignorant and unmannered rural boor. On the day when the envoys were scheduled to meet the shōgun at Edo Castle, Asano drew his wakizashi and attempted to kill Kira in retaliation for the insults. For this, Asano was ordered to commit seppuku, his house abolished, and his retainers branded rōnin, while Kira went unpunished.

=== Assassination ===
On the night of January 30, 1703 (14th day, 12th month, year Genroku-15, according to the Japanese calendar), Asano's retainers broke into Kira's mansion, after almost two years of careful and secret planning, and killed him in revenge. They then surrendered themselves to the shogunate authorities and were ordered to commit seppuku for the murder.

The Tokugawa shogunate condemned the grandson of Kira to death for being incapable of protecting his family like a samurai; the Kira clan were also dispossessed and lost the rank of koke. After the death of Uesugi Tsunakatsu, the revenues of the Uesugi were halved from 300,000 koku to 150,000 koku. On the other hand, the brother of Asano Naganori was re–established, received a revenue of 5,000 koku and the rank of hatamoto.

== Influence ==
Matsura Shigenobu, the Hirado Domain Daimyo who was the first Japanese trader with Dutchmen, namely Jacob Quaeckernaeck, and invited the Dutch East India Company and the East India Company to his domain, later met Kira through a military writer and philosopher Yamaga Sokō to learn Kira family's confidential textbooks Kira Kaichūshō (吉良懐中抄). Shigenobu's descendant Matsura Seizan wrote the 278-volume essay Kasshi Yawa (甲子夜話), and later happened to become the great-grandfather of the Emperor Meiji.

=== Novelization ===
The story of Kira's assassination was firstly written as Kanadehon Chūshingura (仮名手本忠臣蔵) in 1703, and it has been told in kabuki, bunraku, Rōkyoku, Kōdan or Rakugo. In 1927, Jirō Osaragi serialized the story in the Tokyo Nichi Nichi Shimbun under the title of Ako Roshii (赤穂浪士) and the novel was made into a movie by Nikkatsu in 1929. The movie was remade at least 3 times in 1933, 1956, and 1961, respectively. The story has also been told in other stage plays, novels, television shows and other media as Chūshingura (忠臣蔵) until the 21st century.

=== In popular culture ===
The ghost of Kira appears in Episode 113 of the TV animation series Lupin III Part 2. He meets Lupin in the lobby of a theater where the Chuushingura play is being performed, and employs him to look for a treasure. Eventually, it turns out the treasure is Kira's false teeth, which he needed to cross over into the next world.

== Sources ==
- 新井政義（編集者）『日本史事典』。東京：旺文社1987(p. 115)
- 竹内理三（編）『日本史小辞典』。東京：角川書店1985(p. 314)
