= List of Return of Ultraman characters =

This is a list of characters for Return of Ultraman, a 1971 tokusatsu which eventually establishes the Ultraman Series lore by being a sequel to Ultraman and Ultraseven.

== MAT ==
The Monster Attack Team (怪獣攻撃部隊, Kaijū Kōgeki Butai), abbreviated as MAT (マット, Matto), is an attack team founded by the Terrestrial Defense Agency (地上防衛庁, Chijō Bōeichō) to investigate and fight against monster attacks. The main headquarters was located in New York and had several branches across the globe, including a particular space station. Despite their good reputation with the agency, MAT's position in military was very weak and often being pressured towards disbandment as a result of the upper management's dissatisfaction. MAT was officially disbanded at some point prior to Ultraman Ace, but their documents were accessible for references to future attack teams.

=== Members ===
Japan branch

- Katsuichirō Katō (加藤 勝一郎, Katō Katsuichirō; 1-22): The initial captain of MAT's Japan branch, aged 38-years-old. Impressed by Go's courage to save a young boy during Takkong's attack, Katō hired the aspiring racer into MAT during weekdays after making an agreement with Ken Sakata. After Kaji's death from Bemstar's assault on MAT space station, Katō was promoted to the late officer's position and relinquished MAT's leadership to Ryū Ibuki. He is portrayed by Nobuo Tsukamoto (塚本 信夫, Tsukamoto Nobuo).
- Ryū Ibuki (伊吹 竜, Ibuki Ryū; 22-51): The replacement captain of MAT's Japan branch after being transferred from the New York branch. His way of leadership was more stricter than Katō but is still compassionate on several occasions. In addition to being a proficient pilot, Ibuki is also skilled in armed combat against aliens and was acknowledged multiple times for his support towards Ultraman. He has a wife and a daughter, both of which were dragged into an alien assault on two occasions. He is also well aware of Go's double life as an Ultraman and encouraged the young officer after his faith in humanity was left shaken. He is portrayed by Jun Negami (根上 淳, Negami Jun).
- Takeshi Minami (南 猛, Minami Takeshi; 1-32, 34-51): The 25-years-old sub-captain from Nagano Prefecture. He is a fifth dan in kendo and proficient in wielding MAT Guns. Due to his kind personality, he is easy to get along with others and refuse to make judgement from a biased point of view. As he was a bullied victim as a child, Takeshi had distaste for bullies. He is portrayed by Shunsuke Ikeda (池田 駿介, Ikeda Shunsuke).
- Fumio Kishida (岸田 文夫, Kishida Fumio; 1-29, 31, 34-51): A 25-years-old weapons development officer with sniping proficiency. Despite his sense of justice, he was also prone to careless mistakes, such as assuming Twin Tail's egg to be a rock. Kishida was born in a family of four with military background and his brother committed suicide after his father was discovered making poison for the imperial army of Japan to use. His uncle is a chief in the Terrestrial Defense Agency. He is portrayed by Ken Nishida (西田 健, Nishida Ken).
- Ippei Ueno (上野 一平, Ueno Ippei): A 23-years-old mood-maker and passionate member of MAT and is also a believer of superstitions. As he grew up with no family members, Ueno regarded Dr. Koizumi (小泉博士, Koizumi-hakase) as a father figure and was once framed for the latter's murder until Go cleared his name. He is portrayed by Kō Mitsui (三井 恒, Mitsui Kō).
- Yuriko Oka (丘 ユリ子, Oka Yuriko; 1-32, 34-51): The 20-years-old communication officer. Despite the nature of her job, Yuriko is a 4th dan kendoka and is capable of fighting against brainwashed MAT members with ease. In episode 47, Yuriko briefly fell victim into Femigon's host for possession. She is portrayed by Mika Katsuragi (桂木 美加, Katsuragi Mika).
- Hideki Go (郷 秀樹, Gō Hideki): See here

Other members

- Masaru Kondō (近藤 勝, Kondō Masaru; 9): The chief technician of maintenance for MAT's aircraft. He is portrayed by Masashi Ishibashi (石橋 雅史, Ishibashi Masashi).
- Kaji (梶; 18): The initial captain of MAT Station who had a pregnant wife on Earth. He and the other crew members were killed during Bemstar's consumption of MAT Station. He is portrayed by Hiroshi Minami (南 廣, Minami Hiroshi).
- MAT Radar Communication Officer (MATレーダー通信隊員, Matto Rēdā Tsūshin Taiin; 51): An unnamed communication officer that participated in the team's final mission against Alien Bat. He is portrayed by Ultraman Jack's suit actor Eiichi Kikuchi (きくち 英一, Kikuchi Eiichi), who previously portrayed the Kaijinmaru boat steerman in episode 13.

=== Terrestrial Defense Agency ===
- Chief Kishida (岸田長官, Kishida-chōkan; 5, 6, 14): Fumio's uncle and the head of the Terrestrial Defense Agency. Due to his higher authority, Kishida has the right to disband MAT. He is portrayed by Susumu Fujita (藤田 進, Fujita Susumu).
- Staff Officer Satake (佐竹参謀, Satake-sanbo; 5, 6, 11, 20, 50): An officer who acted as a middleman between MAT and the Terrestrial Defense Agency. He is portrayed by Kenji Sahara (佐原 健二, Sahara Kenji).

=== Bases, mechas and vehicles ===
- MAT Arrow 1 (マットアロー1号, Matto Arō Ichi-gō): MAT's signature VTOL aircraft. Its armaments are vulcan guns, missiles, rocket pods and flamethrower. The captain's aircraft is colored yellow on the nosecone. As of Ultraman Mebius, the aircraft was mass-produced into GUYS Arrow 1 (GUYSアロー1号, Gaizu Arō Ichigō) but most of the machines were destroyed by Alien Empera during his march to Phoenix Nest.
  - Space Arrow (スペースアロー, Supēsu Arō): A modified MAT Arrow 1 used for transitioning from MAT Japan branch's headquarters to the MAT Station in outer space.
- MAT Arrow 2 (マットアロー2号, Matto Arō Ni-gō): An aircraft with circular wings and similar armaments to MAT Arrow 1.
- MAT Gyro (マットジャイロ, Matto Jairo): A tiltrotor combat and transport aircraft built from heat and chemical resistance metal. The aircraft was not built for long-distance travel, but is armed with various weapons. When deploying in multiple units, each were designated with alphabetical letters. The captain's use of MAT Gyro has a yellow line.
- MAT Vehicle (マットビハイクル, Matto Bihaikuru): A Mazda Cosmo used for patrolling purposes.
- MAT Jeep (マットジープ, Matto Jīpu): A pair of jeeps used for off-road purposes.
- MAT Sub (マットサブ, Matto Sabu): A submarine used for combat against underwater monsters.
- MAT Station (MATステーション, Matto Sutēshon): A space station commandeered by Captain Kaji. After its destruction by Bemstar and Kaji's death, a new station was built and Katō was promoted as its new captain
- MAT Observation Station: An unnamed space station that the space monster Yadokarin used as a hermit shell.
- Space Station V1 (宇宙ステーションV1, Uchū Sutēshon Bui Wan): A space station that Alien Nackle destroyed after Jack's death.
- MAT Radar Base (MATレーダー基地, Matto Rēdā Kichi): A radar base that appeared in episode 44.

== Ultra Brothers ==
Prior to Ultraman Ace, the collective team of Ultra Warriors were only considered as residents of the Planet Ultra, until Alien Bat acknowledged the team when he announced his Ultra Annihilation Plan. The Ultra Brothers (ウルトラ兄弟, Urutora Kyōdai) would eventually become prominent in most of the succeeding Ultra Series media, starting from Ultraman Ace.

=== Others ===
- Zoffy (ゾフィー, Zofī): An unseen member of the Ultra Brothers that debuted in the final episode of Ultraman. He was mentioned by Alien Bat as one of his targets and according to the 2003 magazine, he was responsible for Jack's descent to Earth after acknowledging his skills.
- Ultraman (ウルトラマン, Urutoraman; 38, 51): See here
- Ultraseven (ウルトラセブン, Urutorasebun; 18, 38): See here

== Antagonists ==
=== Alien Nackle ===
Assassin Alien Alien Nackle (暗殺宇宙人 ナックル星人, Ansatsu Uchūjin Nakkuru Seijin; 37, 38) are a group of invaders aiming to defeat Jack and conquer the Earth. In human forms, they operated in Space Radio Wave Research Institute (宇宙電波研究所, Uchū Denpa Kenkyūjo) led by a director. After reviving Bemstar and Seagorath as test subjects, the Nackles stole Saturn Z bomb from MAT and murdered the older Sakato siblings, Ken and Aki, to diminish Go's spirit. Once Jack was killed and put to crucifixion on their home world, the Nackles disable MAT's aircraft and brainwashed them (saved for Yuriko) in their failed attempt to bust into the Research Institute. After being rescued by the original Ultraman and Seven, Jack decimated the invading fleets and engaged in the fight against the monster and alien pair. In his dying moments, the Nackle leader pridefully gloated over MAT's helplessness from stopping the Saturn Z bomb, despite them proving otherwise afterwards.

- Re-Seagorath (再生シーゴラス, Saisei Shīgorasu; 37) and Re-Bemstar (再生ベムスター, Saisei Bemusutā; 37): A pair of deceased monster revived by Alien Nackle to test Jack's strength. Re-Seagorath was killed when Jack fired his Specium Ray at his horn, while Re-Bemstar was sliced by the Ultra Spark in the same way as its original self.
- Bodyguard Monster Black King (用心棒怪獣 ブラックキング, Yōjinbō Kaijū Burakku Kingu; 37, 38): A monster from the same planet as the Nackles, it was used as a bait to divert MAT's attention while its alien masters stole the Saturn Z bomb. Black King and the Alien Nackle leader managed to defeat Jack in the first battle, partly due to Go's emotional dilemma. When Jack returned to Earth, Black King was summoned again, but instead was decapitated, leaving its master to fend for himself.

The Alien Nackle leader is portrayed by Masahiko Naruse (成瀬 昌彦, Naruse Masahiko) (human form) and voiced by Ritsuo Sawa (沢 りつお, Sawa Ritsuo). The other two subordinates on the other hand were portrayed by Ko Hayami (速水 鴻, Hayami Kō) and Mitsuru Sawa (沢 美鶴, Sawa Mitsuru).

=== Alien Bat ===
Antenna Alien Alien Bat (触覚宇宙人 バット星人, Shokkaku Uchūjin Batto Seijin; 51) is the final antagonist of The Return of Ultraman. By assembling an invasion fleet named Planet Bat Federal Army (バット星連合部隊, Batto-sei Rengō Butai), they put the Ultra Annihilation Project (ウルトラ抹殺計画, Urutora Massatsu Keikaku) into motion by invading the Planet Ultra as part of their campaign against the Ultra Warriors while a lone operative was sent to Earth to deal with the recent member of the Ultra Brothers, Jack. This particular Alien Bat held Jirō and Rumiko as his hostage while using a revived Zetton in his campaign against Ultraman Jack and stripping MAT of their assets while they were busy fighting his monster. At 5:00 pm, he challenged the entire team again and was killed after Jack impaled him with the Ultra Cross.

As revealed in The Ultraman Mebius novel, the Alien Bat's reason of invading the Planet Ultra was due to its inhabitants' refusal to share their life preservation technology that was developed by Ultraman Hikari. The Inter-Galactic Defense Force (including the Ultra Brothers members and a rookie Mebius) managed to counter the invasion but the battle ended with huge losses on both sides.

- Space Dinosaur Zetton II (宇宙恐竜 ゼットン二代目, Uchū Kyōryū Zetton Ni-daime; 51): A different breed of the namesake monster from episode 39 of Ultraman, this one has the ability to shoot Zetton Napalm (ゼットンナパーム, Zetton Napāmu) from its hands. Zetton II was sent as Alien Bat's biological weapon against Jack due to its previous infamy for killing the original Ultraman in 1967. Zetton II was first deployed as a distraction for MAT while Alien Bat invaded their headquarters and destroy their supply of weaponry. MAT fought the two again in their limited assets and this time joined by Ultraman Jack. Both monster and alien had an upper hand against Jack, but the support from MAT members gave the Ultra a second wind by first killing its master and then disabling Zetton by throwing the monster airborne before firing his Specium Ray.

Alien Bat is voiced by Osamu Saka (阪 脩, Saka Osamu).

== Other characters ==
=== Sakata Auto Repair Shop ===
The Sakata Auto Repair Shop (坂田自動車修理工場, Sakata Jidōsha Shūri Kōjō) is an automobile workshop managed by Ken Sakata. Go was its sole employee even before his recruitment into MAT, maintaining his employment during weekends. After the death of Ken and Aki Sakata, the workshop was disbanded.

- Ken Sakata (坂田 健, Sakata Ken; 1-37): The 28-years-old founder of the workshop and its main employer. Ken was originally a racer five years prior to the series but was forced to retire as a result of an accident that injured his left leg. Although he became an engineer after that, Ken's talents were recognized by MAT members as he also lent a hand in improving their vehicles. As revealed in episode 6, Ken and his mother were survivors of an air raid back in his childhood (3 years old). He was killed by the Alien Nackle alongside Aki as part of their plan in weakening Go's spirit. He is portrayed by Shin Kishida (岸田 森, Kishida Shin).
- Aki Sakata (坂田 アキ, Sakata Aki; 1-37): The 18-years-old elder sister and Go's girlfriend, working at a clothing store. Alongside Ken, she was killed by Alien Nackle. The Superior 8 Ultraman Brothers revealed that an alternate universe counterpart of Aki was married to Go and had a daughter named Megu. She is portrayed by Rumi Sakakibara (榊原 るみ, Sakakibara Rumi). Aki's death by Alien Nackle was written due to her actress had a scheduling conflict with another television series at that point of time.
- Jirō Sakata (坂田 次郎, Sakata Jirō): The youngest brother of the siblings, aged 11-years-old. Jirō looked up to Go as an older brother figure and aspired to join MAT in the future. After losing his older siblings to Alien Nackle, Jirō lived with Rumiko and discovered Go's relation to Jack in the final episode. As Jack was forced to return to the Land of Light, Jirō recited the 5 Ultra Oaths as a token of his respect. Jirō made a returning appearance in episode 10 of Ultraman Ace and as revealed in Ultraman Mebius to have shared the 5 Ultra Oaths to Kazuya Serizawa. He is portrayed by Hideki Kawaguchi (川口 英樹, Kawaguchi Hideki).

=== Minor characters ===
- Shizuka Ushiyama (牛山 静香, Ushiyama Shizuka; 12): The daughter of a painter named Takeshi, Shizuka was the subject of his paintings back in her childhood. After she suffered from waist paralysis as a result of a vehicular accident, the family pair moved to the Mt. Shirakami where Takeshi helped his daughter in walking again until his death. Shizuka lived there for the rest of her life until the mountain becomes a battlefield between MAT members and the monster Shugaron. She was killed when trying to save her father's painting as Go and the MAT members buried her next to Takeshi's grave. She is portrayed by Yuka Kumari (久万里 由香, Kumari Yuka).
- Captain Takamura (高村船長, Takamura-senchō; 13, 14): The captain of the Kaijinmaru transport ship until Seamons attack it to devour the gems. Ever since that incident, he was rendered catatonic until he regain his senses from Seagorath and Seamons' thunderstorm. After the two monsters return to the ocean, Takamura returned to his job as a sailor with his new crew members. He is portrayed by Akiji Kobayashi (小林 昭二, Kobayashi Akiji), known for the role of Captain Muramatsu in Ultraman.
- Yoko Takamura (高村 陽子, Takamura Yōko; 13, 14): Captain Takamura's daughter. She is portrayed by Keiko Nishiyama (西山 恵子, Nishiyama Keiko).
- Shiro Odagiri (小田切 史郎, Odagiri Shirō; 15): A young boy who lives in an impoverished neighborhood alongside his grandfather. After losing his mother, Shiro became attached to his train driver father who worked for a train company ran by Captain Katō's brother. His father died a year before the series due to Eledortus, but his death was classified as the train driver's fault while Shiro's claim of Eledortus' fault was dismissed by many. Ever since then, he constantly bullied the captain's nephew, Susumu while observing the monster Eledortus on a nightly basis. During Eledortus' attack on a train, the boy was accused by Minami for instigating the incident, but his testimony was proven when Eledortus attacked a power station. He is portrayed by Hiroyuki Takano (高野 浩幸, Takano Hiroyuki), who had various cameo appearances in Return of Ultraman as Jirō's unnamed friend.
- Saburo Matsumoto (松本 三郎, Matsumoto Saburō; 16-17): A man who's jealous of his lover Yukiko being taken by Hiroshi. He attempts to sabotage Hiroshi's boat party, but Terochilus' attacked foiled his murderous intent despite being arrested nonetheless. After escaping the police, Saburo strapped a few dynamites to himself and kidnapped a blind Yukiko into Terochilus' nest. He was killed after sustaining police gunshots for a very long time. He is portrayed by Shoji Ishibashi (石橋 正次, Ishibashi Shōji).
- Yukiko Ono (小野 由起子, Ono Yukiko; 16-17): Aki Sakata's friend and fiancée of Hiroshi. She was blinded after being exposed to Terochilus' sulfur when combined with Go's exhaust gas emissions and kidnapped by Saburo into Terochilus' nest. She is portrayed by Taeko Hattori (服部 妙子, Hattori Taeko).
- Hiroshi Yokogawa (横川 浩, Yokogawa Hiroshi; 16-17): Yukiko's fiancé. During a celebration, Terochilus attacked the boat due to the noise made from the party and exploded due to Saburo's part. When Yukiko was kidnapped, Hiroshi decided to forsake her out of his own safety when Terochilus made its nest on Tokyo. He is portrayed by Mitsunori Marumo (丸茂 光紀, Marumo Mitsunori).
- Akio Takada (高田 明夫, Takada Akio; 24): A young boy with fanaticism for monsters. He managed to salvage a remaining piece of Kupukupu and inadvertently responsible for the birth of Kingstron. He is portrayed by Hiroyuki Kawase (川瀬 裕之, Kawase Hiroyuki).
- Saburō Higashi (東 三郎, Higashi Saburō; 27): A boxer who was taught of the Ultra Kick attack by Go in order to win a boxing competition against Tadashi Sawamura. He is portrayed by Hiroshi Yamanami (山波 ひろし, Yamanami Hiroshi).
- Minako Ibuki (伊吹 美奈子, Ibuki Minako; 31): Captain Ibuki's daughter. She is portrayed by Tomoko Ōki (大木 智子, Ōki Tomoko).
- Tarō Nohara (野原 太郎, Nohara Tarō; 32): A young boy who's adopted by Sakuta Nohara after his biological father died in a mining accident back when he was a newborn. Sakuta took care of the boy to honor his late friend, but their relationship became strained after Tarō learned the real fate of his late father. After Kingmaimai's death, the two reconciled and finally making peace with Taro's late father. He is portrayed by Kazuhito Matsubara (松原 和仁, Matsubara Kazuhito).
- Ryo Sakuma (佐久間 良, Sakuma Ryō; 33): An orphan accused by the townspeople as an alien due to his constant attempts at digging the Alien Meits' spaceship. A year prior, he was discovered and taken care by the ill Alien Meits, with Ryo likewise saw him as a father figure. When Ryo was about to be executed by the anti-alien sentiment group, the Alien Meits took the bullet for him. Following Muruchi's death, Ryo continuously dig underground to claim the hidden spaceship, wanting to leave Earth while still under the impression that Meits had returned to his home planet. In Ultraman Mebius, Ryo was revealed to have died at some point of time. His story and exploits were recounted by a nursery school director, allowing Meits' son Beo to bury his grudges and calling off his attempt in revenge. He is portrayed by Hideya Nihei (二瓶 秀哉, Nihei Hideya) in Return and by child actors Tatsuya Kamachi (蒲地 竜也, Kamachi Tatsuya) and Taiju Nakane (中根 大樹, Nakane Taiju) in Mebius. He was named after a common surname of the Ainu people living in Hokkaidō.
  - In Anderes Horizont, the alternate retelling novel of Mebius, Ryo was revealed to have been taken care by an orphanage after that incident but he constantly fled to dig up Meits' spaceship until the boy actually disappeared at some point of time. Ryo was implied to have been aged as an unnamed old man and encountered the son of a kind baker he met as a child.
- Ichirō Mizuno (水野 一郎, Mizuno Ichirō; 34): Go's childhood friend and the current owner of his late father's laboratory. In order to create the ultimate life form, Mizuno combined the DNA of a plant and animal to create Leogon. While assisting MAT in defeating his gigantic creation, Mizuno was killed during an attempt to reach out for his creation. He is portrayed by Mikio Shimizu (清水 幹生, Shimizu Mikio).
- Rumiko Murano (村野 ルミ子, Murano Rumiko; 38-41, 44, 49, 51): A college student who lived with her mother in an apartment next to Go's room. She became Jirō's caretaker after the deaths of the Sakata elder siblings and providing the young boy with moral support. She also harbored an affection for Go and learned of her crush's double life as an Ultraman in the final episode. Alongside Jirō, Rumiko returned in episode 10 of Ultraman Ace. She is portrayed by Kazuko Iwasaki (岩崎 和子, Iwasaki Kazuko).

== Monsters and aliens ==
=== Aliens ===
- Space Phantom Alien Zelan (宇宙怪人 ゼラン星人, Uchū Kaijin Zeran Seijin; 31): The first alien to appear in the series, his mission is to kill Ultraman Jack on Earth. He assumed the human form of a deaf young boy named Teruo Kazama (風間 輝男, Kazama Teruo), using his friendship with Ibuki's daughter, Minako, to infiltrate MAT headquarters. Zelan made himself known to Go using a special telepathy, putting the officer in a psychological warfare situation when his claims fell on deaf's ears. With his controller, Zelan manipulated the space monster Plooma into fighting Jack, but his true goal was to hijack the Ultra Bracelet against its wearer. Ibuki managed to locate Teruo at a morgue where he killed the boy in a gunfight, revealing Teruo's true form upon death. Despite Go's insistence to cover Teruo's disappearance from Minako, Ibuki was against it after his experience from being deceived by an alien. Alien Zelan is voiced by Tetsuya Kaji (梶 哲也, Kaji Tetsuya), while Teruo is portrayed by Kentaro Nagayoshi (永吉 健太郎, Nagayoshi Kentarō).
- Space Investigator Alien Meits (宇宙調査員 メイツ星人, Uchū Chōsa-in Meitsu Seijin; 33): A white alien who assumed the human form Jūrō Kanayama (金山 十郎, Kanayama Jūrō), his main ability is telekinesis, allowing him to bury Muruchi and his spaceship underground. A year prior, his arrival on Earth was to investigate the planet's suitability with his own kind but constant pollution deteriorated his health and making it harder to locate said spaceship. He discovered the orphan Sakuma and came to treat the boy like his own son. Due to his attempt in protecting the boy, Meits was killed by a policeman from the townspeople's anti-alien sentiment group and this resulted with the release of Muruchi. As revealed in Ultraman Mebius, this particular Meits had a son named Beo (ビオ, Bio). In his human form Kanayama, he is portrayed by Kenjirō Uemura (植村 謙二郎, Uemura Kenjirō) and named after a common surname used by native Korean in Japan. In the flashback scene of Mebius, he is portrayed by Tomonori Yoshida (吉田 智則, Yoshida Tomonori). His death was written by Shozo Uehara as a nod to the discrimination of Koreans during the Kantō Massacre.
- Vampiric Space Alien Draculas (吸血宇宙星人 ドラキュラス, Kyūketsu Uchū Seijin Dorakyurasu; 36): A vampire bat alien who planned on eradicating mankind by killing young women. His method was done by assimilating with the corpse of Midori Suzumura (鈴村 みどり, Suzumura Midori) and targeted her identical daughter's friends. MAT was issued into the case when the death rates had reached 15 victims as they traced Draculas' space ship. Jack fought the invader once he was exposed and killed him with Ultra Cross. After his death, Go managed to salvage Midori's corpse to her father. Draculas is voiced by Tetsuya Kaji, while Midori is portrayed by Yūko Tobe (戸部 夕子, Tobe Yūko).
- Yeti Alien Alien Varduck (雪男星人 バルダック星人, Yuki Otoko Seijin Barudakku Seijin; 39): An alien race from Planet Varduck, a cold celestial body that approached Earth in its rotation orbit for every 240 years. One lone operative made its living on Earth for that same period of time in Mt. Gongen of Nagano Prefecture and established his reputation as a Yeti to mountain climbers. By possessing a researcher named Hideo, Varduck signaled his brethren for Earth invasion by freezing Tokyo. Jack defeated the giant and annihilated their invading fleets before using the Ultra Bracelet to wipe out Planet Varduck. He is voiced by Isao Yatsu (谷津 勲, Yatsu Isao), also the voice of Jack in fewer episodes.
- Freezing Phantom Alien Black (冷凍怪人 ブラック星人, Reitō Kaijin Burakku Seijin; 40): A group of aliens that established a base in Saturn. One lone operative went to Earth alongside their monster Snowgon, where he possessed the old man Nakayama (中山老人, Nakayama-rōjin) and his daughter Misako into kidnapping 1,000 newlywed couples in order to breed slaves in Saturn. After Snowgon's destruction, Nakayama and his granddaughter was released from the alien's possession. He is voiced by Hiroshi Kiyama (寄山 弘, Kiyama Hiroshi), who also portrayed Nakayama.
- Space Ninja Alien Baltan Jr. (宇宙忍者 バルタン星人Jr, Uchū Ninja Barutan Seijin Junia; 41): The son of the original Alien Baltan from episode 2 of Ultraman, he is also known as Alien Baltan IV (バルタン星人四代目, Barutan Seijin Yon-daime). To avenge his late father, he elaborates a plan by kidnapping Susumu, Jiro and MAT members into Billgamo, holding their lives in jeopardy while forcing Jack to give up. Alien Baltan Jr. escapes after Jack tore down Billgamo and narrowly avoided death from Specium Ray. He is voiced by Osamu Saka.
- Space Phantom Alien Stora (宇宙怪人 ストラ星人, Uchū Kaijin Sutora Seijin; 42): An alien from Planet Stora of the seventh galaxy. Wanting to claim the Earth as his tourism area, he manipulated Paragon into creating various mirage incidents at the village in Mount Fuji's vicinity. Like Paragon, Stora also had the ability to manipulate light and radio waves, doing so to disrupt radar detection of his monster. He was burned alive after Paragon dropped into Mount Fuji's volcano. He is voiced by Osamu Saka.
- Firing Alien Alien Grotes (発砲怪人 グロテス星人, Happō Kaijin Gurotesu Seijin; 43): An alien invader who aims for the dissolution of MAT. He targeted Captain Ibuki's family in Shinshū, posing as a farmer where he put his family as a hostage in exchange for MAT headquarters' destruction. Before he can execute the mother/daughter pair, Grotes was forced to support Kodaigon when Jack appeared, taking the statue as a shield due to his vulnerable physiology. Grotes was split into half by Jack's Ultra Spark, causing Kodaigon to revert into the go-shintai it was. As revealed in Ultraman Mebius, remains of the Grotes Cells (グロテスセル, Gurotesu Seru) were salvaged by Crew GUYS years prior to the series and disposed after attempts in weaponizing it hit a dead end. One of the remaining cells transformed an ebisu statue into a second Kodaigon. The Alien Grotes is voiced by Kentarō Kaji (加地 健太郎, Kaji Kentarō), who also portrayed his unnamed human form.
- Space Bull-men Alien Kentauros (宇宙牛人 ケンタウルス星人, Uchū Gyūjin Kentaurusu Seijin; 44): An alien race trying to invade the Earth. One female operative disguised herself as Akane Hirota (広田 茜, Hirota Akane) to slip into MAT and destroy their new radar device. After falling in love with Kishida and discovered him as the radar's creator, she betrayed her race to sacrifice her life in killing Granadas. She was immortalized on Earth under a human name by MAT members. Akane Hirota is portrayed by Yūko Akane (茜 夕子, Akane Yūko).
- Electromagnetic Wave Phantom Alien Messie (電磁波怪人 メシエ星雲人, Denjiha Kaijin Meshie Seiunjin; 45): An alien aiming to invade Earth after his home planet became uninhabitable from constant development of super weapons. To kill Go, he first used Robonezu and later on mind-controlled a doctor and Erika as his minions. After Go was sedated with an anesthesia, the alien exposed itself to attack the city. Jack managed to kill him through his Ultra Bracelet, therefore freeing his minions from the mind control devices. He is voiced by Isao Yatsu.
- Alien Cygnus 61 Erika (白鳥座61番星人 エリカ, Hakuchō-za Rokujū-ichi-ban Seijin Erika; 45): A young alien girl forcefully mind-controlled by Alien Messie to assassinate Go. She disguised herself as Jiro's new classmate named Erika Shiratori (白鳥 エリカ, Shiratori Erika) and slipped in a pen-shaped bomb to kill Go, but the plan failed as the bomb was quickly detected. With her status as an assassin exposed, Go, Minami and Jiro tracked her where the mind control device was quickly removed. Messie puts her under control again alongside a local doctor to disable Go. Erika is portrayed by Junko Kawasaki (川崎 純子, Kawasaki Junko).
- Space Staff Officer Alien Zoole (宇宙参謀 ズール星人, Uchū Sanbō Zūru Seijin; 46): An alien disguised as a raree show old man on Earth. He injured Toru to frame Go for the attack in order to suspend him and Jack from interfering with his race's invasion. When Toru exposed the old man's identity, Kishida sniped him with a gun. The unnamed raree old man is portrayed by Jun Tatara (多々良 純, Tatara Jun) while the Zoole leader is voiced by Isao Yatsu.
- Space Phantom Sasahiler (宇宙怪人 ササヒラー, Uchū Kaijin Sasahirā; 48): An alien aiming to invade Earth. Using Yametaranse, Sasahiler try to render mankind lazier but was forced to actively fighting Jack after his plan failed, resulting from a death by Specium Ray. He is voiced by Isao Yatsu.
- Galactic Alien Alien Mysteller (銀河星人 ミステラー星人, Ginga Seijin Misuterā Seijin; 49): A race of aliens that constantly at war with Alien Atelier.
  - The first Mysteller is a combat captain who wishes to enlist MAT and Ultraman Jack as part of Mysteller's military troop. After attempts to get a fugitive soldier to his side fails, he threatens Ultraman Jack with the brainwashed MAT members. He tried to escape with his space saucer, but MAT members intercepted him in time and ended his evil plot on Earth. He is voiced by Kagetake Morimoto (森本 景武, Morimoto Kagetake), who also portrays his unnamed human form.
  - Hoshino (星野): An old man who is actually a Mysteller veteran that wanted to flee from his home world's conflict. He was forced to kidnap Jiro and Rumiko when his old captain threatened with killing Terumi. Seeing the error of his ways, Hoshino try to fight him but Jack saved the alien in time and therefore allowing both father and daughter to live in peace. He is portrayed by Fujio Murakami (村上 不二夫, Murakami Fujio).
  - Terumi Hoshino (星野 輝美, Hoshino Terumi): The human form of the heroic Mysteller's daughter, she was originally kidnapped by the brainwashed Oka and Ueno before Go disabled them. Terumi managed to stop her father from killing Go when the Mysteller captain threaten him and finally continued living her life as a human. She is portrayed by Mayumi Furuya (古屋 まゆみ, Furuya Mayumi).
- Alien Atelier (アテリア星人, Ateria Seijin; 49): A race of aliens that went on a war with residents of Planet Mysteller. This conflict is still ongoing even during the era of Ultraman Mebius. In Zamsher's novel, it was revealed that the racial conflict was a competition to secure their position as one of Alien Empera's forces.

=== Earth monsters ===
- Oil Monster Takkong (オイル怪獣 タッコング, Oiru Kaijū Takkongu; 1, 2): The first monster to be awakened in 1971 due to a mysterious phenomenon surrounding Earth. In addition to consuming oil, Takkong can also spit them from its mouth in the form of fire, as well as with water too. Takkong killed Zazarn in its awakening and played an indirect part in Go's encounter with Ultraman Jack by attacking the building he was in. The day after Arstron's death, Takkong targeted various supply ships and consume oils from a nearby petroleum complex, threatening the workers inside. It was killed by Jack's Specium Ray after several amputations.
- Sludge Monster Zazarn (ヘドロ怪獣 ザザーン, Hedoro Kaijū Zazān; 1): A sea monster consisting of poisonous seaweed sludge. It fought against Takkong nearby the Sumida River and was killed after its seaweeds dried and being tossed to nearby warehouses.
- Berserk Monster Arstron (凶暴怪獣 アーストロン, Kyōbō Kaijū Āsutoron; 1): A subterrean/volcanic dinosaur-like monster with the ability to exhale Magma Ray (マグマ光線, Maguma Kōsen). Arstron appeared in the vicinity of Mount Asagiri and terrorized its villagers, becoming Jack's first opponent prior to its destruction by the latter's Specium Ray.
- Rock Monster Sadolar (岩石怪獣 サドラ, Ganseki Kaijū Sadora; 3): Resided in the vicinity of Mt. Kirifuki, Sadolar exploited the intense fog surrounding the mountain to prey on climbers and is armed with a pair of steel-cutting pincers. Go was the only one to sense the monster's presence due to his enhanced sense of hearing but his warnings fell on deaf ears since none of the MAT members were able to sense the monster. In order to clarify Go's warnings, Captain Kato went on a hike and was targeted by Sadolar. The next day, Sadolar joined forces with Detton in fighting against Jack but the alliance faltered when a fleeing Detton was killed, leaving Sadolar decapitated with Jack's Ultra Slash. As revealed in Ultraman Mebius, the thick fog was one of the many abilities generated by Sadolar as a form of environmental camouflage.
- Underground Monster Detton (地底怪獣 デットン, Chitei Kaijū Detton; 3): A day after Captain Kato hid himself from Sadolar, Go went to his aid but Detton surfaced and briefly fought against Sadolar. The two monsters put their differences aside in fighting Ultraman Jack, but as Detton was about to escape, Jack intercepted it with Specium Ray. Due to its appearance, Detton was said to be the younger sibling of Talesdon from Ultraman, down to the point of sharing its flame exhaling ability.
- Ancient Monster Kingsaurus III (古代怪獣 キングザウルス三世, Kodai Kaijū Kinguzaurusu San-sei; 4): A quadrupedal dinosaur monster that eats uranium, hence its first attack on a power station. After his MAT Arrow 2 was taken down, Go transforms into Jack but Kingsaurus III's barrier prevented the Ultra from even hurting it and was forcefully reverted to Go upon defeat. Days later, Kingsaurus III targeted another power station but Jack managed to perform Meteor Kick by jumping over its barrier, thanks to Go's constant training. The fleeing monster was quickly killed by a Specium Ray shot.
- Underground Monster Gudon (地底怪獣 グドン, Chitei Kaijū Gudon; 5, 6): An ancient monster from the Mesozoic era that preys on Twin Tails. In addition to its impervious rhinoceros-like skin, Gudon's main weapon is a pair of whip arms. It was first awakened from a quarry in Okutama but escaped MAT's attack due to Go's part in sensing a nearby civilian, sending him to a 3-day house arrest. Targeting the recently hatched Twin Tails, both whip monsters defeated Jack and left to fight outside the city. After Twin Tail was blinded by MAT, Gudon took the opportunity to kill its prey and was instantly on the receiving end of Jack's Specium Ray.
- Prehistoric Monster Twin Tail (古代怪獣 ツインテール, Kodai Kaijū Tsuin Tēru; 5, 6): Another monster from the Mesozoic era and Gudon's prey. Its name is due to the inverted body position, and is armed with a pair of anesthesia-laced tails as its weapons. Its egg was discovered at the Shinjuku construction site where everyone except Go and Jirō dismissed it as a rock. The egg traveled underground and injured Aki and the other four victims within a toppled shopping mall. The egg hatched to reveal Twin Tail and managed to defeat Jack when its predator Gudon join the battle before luring the latter monster away from the city. At some point later on, the resurfaced Twin Tail was blinded by MAT's bazookas thanks to Jack's assistance and was killed from Gudon's bite.
- Invisible Monster Gorbagos (透明怪獣 ゴルバゴス, Tōmei Kaijū Gorubagosu; 7): A carnivorous nocturnal monster that lives on the Hell Valley (地獄谷, Jigokudani) and is able to spit Flame Bullets (火炎弾, Kaen-dan). Like a chameleon, Gorbagos can either turn invisible or changing its skin color to blend in with the surrounding. The monster was first sighted by Jirō through his monochrome camera, but was dismissed by many as a photomanipulation on the young boy's part except Go and Ken. After Go spotted the monster attacking a group of campers at night, the MAT members used rainbow-colored paints to mark Gorbagos. Now stripped of its camouflage ability, Gorbagos was forced to hide underground and ambush the MAT members on the next day. After his MAT Arrow was taken down, Go transform into Jack and fired his Specium Ray on the monster's neck.
- Bomb Monster Ghostron (爆弾怪獣 ゴーストロン, Bakudan Kaijū Gōsutoron; 8): The gold-skinned younger brother of Arstron and exhales Fire Magma (ファイヤーマグマ, Faiyā Maguma). The monster's field of vision is limited to 20 meters but it compensate this for an enhanced sense of hearing and eats golds. First spotted in Osugi Valley, Go was sent to destroy the monster with Kishida's X Bomb but Ghostron's sudden response to his presence caused the missile to be lodged into its tail with the time limit of 10 hours. Despite its initial movement to Tokyo, Ghostron changed course to the Hibi Kagaku dynamite factory due to its attraction to the loud siren noise. MAT's attempt to sedate Ghostron failed but Go managed to lure the monster away to a safe zone and transformed into Jack to bring it to space for safe detonation.
- Ancient Monster Dangar (古代怪獣 ダンガー, Kodai Kaijū Dangā; 9): A lion-themed monster that was sleeping in Minamidaitōjima. It has a durable skin, energy storing mane, a claw on each hands and a large fang on its mouth. After he crash landed on the island, Minami helped a trio of researchers to locate through the Monster Sonar he was delivering and detonated the cave where said monster was sleeping in. Unfortunately their actions only awaken Dangar into attacking them until Go raced to the island to deliver a cure for Minami's tetanus. He transformed into Ultraman Jack to deal with and kill Dangar with Specium Ray once the mane had been removed.
- Fossil Monster Stegon (化石怪獣 ステゴン, Kaseki Kaijū Sutegon; 10): A fossil of a herbivore dinosaur discovered by elementary students, it was named Stegon due to its resemblance to a stegosaurus. Assumed by many to be deceased, the dinosaur is actually alive in an asphyxiated state and was awakened from the explosions at the excavation site. Gastric juices leaked from its stomach killed a few of the construction workers and it exhale acidic solvent. After terrorizing the same construction site at night, Stegon resurfaced the next day and confronted the MAT members. Under the children's wish to spare the monster, Jack froze Stegon with Stop Ray and brought it to outer space where it turned into a star and remain in hibernation for the rest of its life.
- Poison Gas Monster Mognezeun (毒ガス怪獣 モグネズン, Dokugasu Kaijū Mogunezun; 11): An underground monster from Nishinozawa with the ability to unleash Flash Ray (フラッシュ光線, Furasshu Kōsen) from its back. After eating the Yellow Gas (イエローガス, Ierō Gasu), a buried weapon that was made by the Japanese Army, Mognezeun is able to weaponize it to kill an entire filming crew and a few lodgers at four days later due to its sensitivity with noises. With Kishida hospitalized, the rest of MAT members deal with the monster. Go was forced to transform into Jack when the poison gas started to affect him. Once MAT dropped a pair of flammable gas tanks, Jack set the flame around Mognezeun and reversed the tide of the battle. It was killed not long after from the Ultra Spin Kick delivered onto its head.
- Soundwave Monster Shugaron (音波怪獣 シュガロン, Onpa Kaijū Shugaron; 12): A monster living in Mt. Shirakami nearby the bypass area. It has the ability to exhale heat ray from its mouth and hated sulfur, hence its aversion for the quarry where MAT's training took place. Originally quiet and docile, the monster can be provoked by extreme noises from cars and motorcycle, hence it attacked a trio of bikers when they harass the late Ushiyama's daughter Shizuka. Due to reports from the monsters attacks (both on the bikers and destroying the bypass), MAT was forced to intervene while Go try to move Shizuka away from Mt. Shirakami. Shugaron was killed by Jack's Ultra Haze Cutting. Go sympathizes with the monster, believing that it was a reincarnation of Takeshi Ushiyama trying to protect his daughter till the very end.
- Tsunami Monster Seamons (津波怪獣 シーモンス, Tsunami Kaiju Shīmonsu; 13, 14): A female hen-themed monster lived in the Western New Guinea, capable of generating tsunami and attacking opponents with an electric flash from her horn. Its existence had been reported in legends and although normally a gentle monster, Seamons became violent during mating seasons. In search of ores and gemstones necessary for the nutrients that make up the egg shell, she attacked the gem-transporting fishing boat Kaijinmaru during its return to Japan and was sighted at Hachijō-jima at some point of time before making her way to a cement factory at the coast of Tokyo. MAT initially refrained from attacking, but was forced to interfere due to the factory manager's part. Seamons was provoked by the Defense Army's attack twice into summoning Seagorath into creating a tsunami, thunderstorm and tornado. Its right eye was injured by MAT's laser gun and the couple decided to return to the sea.
- Tornado Monster Seagorath (竜巻怪獣 シーゴラス, Tatsumaki Kaijū Shīgorasu; 13, 14): The rooster-like husband of Seamons, summoned by its wife's horn flash after she was endangered by the Defense Force. Seagorath try to sink Tokyo with a tsunami, but Jack managed to halt the wave with his Ultra Barrier. When the Defense Force attack Seamons again, Seagorath decided to step on Tokyo and summoned tornado and thunderstorm with his wife. Two days later, MAT and Jack attacked the monster couple as they used the SP-70 laser cannon to severe its horn, forcing the couple to retreat to the ocean. Off-camera, the monster couple successfully gave birth to their children, named Minigorath (ミニゴラス, Minigorasu). Like its wife, Seagorath's horns can unleash a flash of electricity. Once their horns synchronized, they can initiate Twin Spark (ツインスパーク, Tsuin Supāku) to summon a series of natural disasters.
- Electricity-Absorbing Monster Eledortus (吸電怪獣 エレドータス, Kyūden Kaijū Eredōtasu; 15): A tortoise-like monster with the ability to turn invisible, consuming electricity and exhaling 150,000 volts of Electric Ray (電気光線, Denki Kōsen). Like the animal its based on, Eledortus can retract its head into its shell to protect its weak point. The monster appeared for at least a year prior to the series and killed a train driver. His son, Shiro, witnessed the monster but the boy's plea fell on deaf's ears and had since observing the monster's feast on electricity on a nightly basis. In the present day, it attacked a train and a nearby station. Its presence in the next day managed to vindicate Shiro's proof and fought against Ultraman Jack. After being attacked with MAT Arrow 1's napalm, Jack killed the monster with Specium Ray.
- Ancestral Strange-Bird Terochilus (始祖怪鳥 テロチルス, Shiso Kaichō Terochirusu; 16, 17): A nocturnal pterosaur monster that try to turn Tokyo into its new residential area after its original homeland, Evil Island (悪島, Akujima) is suffering from a volcanic eruption. It has the ability to exhale sulfuric webs that gradually turn poisonous when combined with carbon monoxide and creating gusts of winds by flapping its wings. Terochilus attacked Hiroshi's boat and a commercial airplane due to its sensitivity with noises. After covering a portion of Tokyo with sulfurous webs, it caused poison gas due to the high number of automobiles at the moment. Go managed to locate Terochilus at the Evil Island and signaled MAT to attack the monster. Ultraman Jack try to participate, but the monster was too strong to handle and left the island for its new nest in Tokyo. Things gradually worsened when Saburo kidnapped Yukiko and took refuge in Terochilus' nest. The next day, Terochilus was met with the attacks of the Earth Defense Army as a whole. Jack chased the monster mid-air and slams the monster to the ground.
- Magnetic Monster Magnedon (磁力怪獣 マグネドン, Jiryoku Kaijū Magunedon; 20): A monster that draws the power of magnetism from Earth, Magnedon originally hibernated in the Arctic and burrow itself to the Kumasawa valley in Japan. Aside from exhaling flames, it has a strong magnetic wave from its back that resulted with five aviation accidents of commercial airplanes. Since its body is made from solid magma, Go proposed a plan to kill it with magnetized bombs but despite its success, Magnedon reforms itself through a thunderstorm. As even MAT is incapable of draining Magnedon of its power, Jack brought the monster to space where he detonated it into smaller pieces scattered throughout the universe.
- Plastic Monster Gokinezura (プラスチック怪獣 ゴキネズラ, Purasuchikku Kaijū Gokinezura; 22): A plastic-eating monster with the ability to spray PVC web, releasing plastic-eating virus and has strong reflexes to catch incoming projectiles. A similar monster was originally spotted at New York, which forced the new captain Ibuki to remain a little longer from joining the Japanese branch of MAT. Another one came from the Tokyo landfill area Yumenoshima where it was remain underground. Go's mistake in putting off the fire caused Gokinezura to surface and face off against MAT members and Jack. Thanks to captain Ibuki's arrival, he was able to trick the monster into catching his missile as Jack fired it, killing it after detonating its head with Specium Ray.
- Eight Cuts Monster Gronken (八つ切り怪獣 グロンケン, Yatsu-giri Kaijū Guronken; 27): A monster that appeared in one night and sliced one of the three Guanyin statues Matsumoto, Nagano with its buzzsaw arms. Jack fought the monster in a kickboxing challenge. Even with its arms dismembered, Gronken still had its tail to perform jumping attack but Jack quickly beheaded the monster with a combination of Ultra Spark and Ultra Kick.
- Typhoon Monster Varricane (台風怪獣 バリケーン, Taifū Kaijū Barikēn; 28): A jellyfish monster from the coastal area of Micronesia and had created various typhoon incidents in Japan. In addition to emitting gas, Varricane's mouth can also absorb Jack's Specium Ray. When Varricane exposed itself in Tokyo, MAT came up with the plan to inject it with anesthesia missiles, but it only agitated the monster even further to create a typhoon. With explosive missiles and even Jack's Specium Ray were proven futile, the Ultra brought the monster to outer space for detonation.
- Water Buffalo Monster Oxter (水牛怪獣 オクスター, Suigyū Kaijū Okusutā; 30): The endling of an ancient water buffaloes, Oxter survived fossilization long enough to be mutated into a giant monster while dedicating to protect the remains of its deceased comrades. After it killed a pair of scavengers and a local old man, the Sakata brothers reported the incident to MAT. Initially Oxter had the upper hand against Jack but the Ultra turn the tables by evaporating an entire lake using his Ultra Bracelet. Oxter was stripped to the bone with Ultra Shot while its remains sank in the rejuvenated lake.
- Transforming Monster King Maimai (変幻怪獣 キングマイマイ, Hengen Kaijū Kingu Maimai; 32): A moth-like monster from beneath the Ryujindake mountain and awakened due to a series of earthquakes. Normal equipments like MAT Vehicle's cannons were incapable of injuring the monster, but Ueno's bombs managed to dismember its right arm. Unfortunately King Maimai evolved into a winged monster that Jack faced against. After faking death, it sprayed web to Jack but was defeated by force-swallowing the Bracelet Bomb.
- Giant Fish Monster Muruchi (巨大魚怪獣 ムルチ, Kyodai-gyo Kaijū Muruchi; 33): A salmon-like monster with the ability to shoot heat ray, which was sealed by the Alien Meits in order to protect Sakuma and a nearby city. When the Alien Meits was killed by the citizens, his telepathic seal was undone and Muruchi was released into the city to resume its original reign of terror. Despite Go's initial refusal to transform (wanting Meits' killers to reap for their misdeeds), he fought Muruchi as Jack and defeated the monster with Specium Ray.
- Light Monster Priz-ma (光怪獣 プリズ魔, Hikari Kaijū Purizuma; 35): A crystal-like monster that previously remain dormant in Antarctica, it has the ability to crystallize its targets. Once awakened, Priz-ma attacked various sources of artificial lights such as ships and lighthouses but assimilated with the sunlight during the day. Jack's attempts to fight it was futile as the monster undid most of his attacks. MAT devises a plan to use a stadium as a bait and freeze Priz-ma in the same temperature as Antarctica. Jack dived into the monster and destroy it from within using Specium Ray, causing Priz-ma to break into pieces.

=== Space monsters ===
- Giant Space Monster Bemstar (宇宙大怪獣 ベムスター, Uchū Dai Kaijū Bemusutā; 18): The first space monster in the series, born from an explosion in Crab Nebula. After devouring the MAT Station and Kaji's entire crew with it, Bemstar targeted Earth to consume hydrogen, helium and nitrogen. Due to its mouth and beak, the monster is capable of absorbing energy attacks that forced Jack to go to the Sun for recharge, eventually being saved and receiving the Ultra Bracelet from Ultraseven. With it, he uses the Ultra Spark to slice Bemstar's limbs and head, finally avenging Kaji and the MAT Station staff members.
- Ninja Monster Sartan (忍者怪獣 サータン, Ninja Kaijū Sātan; 19): An elephant-like monster with its body composition consist of neutrons, hence the ability to turn invisible, intangible and teleportation. Its long trunk can be used as a choking weapon. The monster arrived on Earth as a meteor and grew itself after crushing Jiro's school. At night, MAT discovered the monster's ability to turn invisible and its body composition. Jack fought the monster on the next day by exposing its invisibility and using Ultra Super Ray to defeat Sartan.
- Radio Monster Beakon (電波怪獣 ビーコン, Denpa Kaijū Bīkon; 21): An ionosphere-inhabiting space monster that devour radio waves from its back. In addition, it can fire beams from a pair of red eyes, its yellow eye can act as a television camera to an entire world's television and unleashing 500,000 volts of electricity. In order to lure Beakon away, Go proposed the plan for Tokyo to shut down their electric waves while Ueno in MAT Arrow 1 serve as the bait, but the plan fail when a boy named Tsutomu communicated with his faraway friend, causing Beakon to target his home. Jack fought the monster and kill it by throwing his Ultra Bracelet to Beakon's face.
- Cancer Monster Zanika (カニ座怪獣 ザニカ, Kani-za Kaijū Zanika; 23): A crab-like space monster from space that fly with the speed of Mach 6. Despite having weapons such as a pair of pincers and bubbles, its non-hostile nature prevented the monster from using them. Originally a benevolent monster from the Cancer constellation, Zanika was forced to flee to Earth when Vacuumon prepared to eat its home constellation while forced to possess the body of an astrologer named Junko Nanjo (南條 純子, Nanjō Junko). Each time Vacuumon ate a star from Cancer, Zanika went crazy from mourning the loss of its constellation. Jack was forced to amputate both of its arms despite knowing the monster actually meant no harm. After killing Vacuumon, Zanika peacefully returned to its home planet where it regrow its lost limbs. Junko is portrayed by Rie Yokoyama (横山 リエ, Yokoyama Rie).
- Dark Monster Vacuumon (暗黒怪獣 バキューモン, Ankoku Kaijū Bakyūmon; 23): A massive creature depicted as a living black hole from the 108th space system. it ate the stars in Big Dipper and Cancer (one of them being Zanika's home planet). Despite its size proportion, Jack was able to tear the monster with Bracelet Needle and returning the stars it had devoured.
- Space Small Monster Kupukupu (宇宙小怪獣 クプクプ, Uchū Shō Kaijū Kupukupu; 24): A space monster that crash-landed and taken captive by the locals for MAT to conduct their studies. Although they try to burn its remains, Akio picked up a surviving piece that he placed it to his condominium. Kupukupu was restored into a picture on a wall.
  - Condominium Monster Kingstron (マンション怪獣 キングストロン, Manshon Kaijū Kingusutoron; 24): Wishing for Kupukupu to become a strong monster, Akio instructed the picture monster to alter its body features into resembling his ideals and rename it Kingstron. However, the monster was materialized in a few days and begins to destroy Akio's apartment. Under the boy's orders, Jack reverses its two horns to halt the monster before throwing his Ultra Bracelet into a flesh-eating bomb, reducing Kingstron to its skeleton.
- Meteorite Monster Zagoras (隕石怪獣 ザゴラス, Inseki Kaijū Zagorasu; 25): Originally a microorganism attached to a meteorite from Planet Zagoras and mutated on Earth after it was exposed to a radioactive element. The giant meteorite actually became the very foundation of Aino Village where it started to blast off to outer space as a result of Planet Zagoras' gravitational attraction. After saving Minami and Jamikko with the Ultra Bracelet, Jack killed Zagoras by colliding the monster with said meteorite.
- Insect Monster Nokogilin (昆虫怪獣 ノコギリン, Konchū Kaijū Nokogirin; 26): A three-horned beetle that killed clients of a hotel due to their use of electronics with similar sound to its buzzing. After the Sakata siblings capture it, MAT attempted to execute Nokogilin but the insect grows human sized and eventually turned into a monster by the time it reappeared. Once disabling it with Ultra Bracelet, Jack killed the monster with Specium Ray.
- Hermit Crab Monster Yadokarin (やどかり怪獣 ヤドカリン, Yadokari Kaijū Yadokarin; 29): A giant hermit crab monster in search of a new shell, using MAT's Space Station No. 5 and landed on West Tokyo. Jiro was inside the station during his search for Yoshiko's parakeet, forcing Go to personally rescue the boy. After MAT Arrow unleashed its napalm missiles, Jack skewered Yadokarin with Ultra Lance and burn it with Specium Ray.
- Decoy Monster Plooma (囮怪獣 プルーマ, Otori Kaijū Purūma; 31): A giant armadillo-themed monster from Zelan's home world, its true purpose was to act as a bait for Jack to use his Ultra Bracelet, fulfilling its duty at the cost of its own life. Plooma is capable of firing a heat ray and using its poisonous fangs.
- Yuki-onna Monster Snowgon (雪女怪獣 スノーゴン, Yuki Onna Kaijū Sunōgon; 40): A space monster belonged to Alien Black who possessed Misako (美佐子) while using the legend of Yuki-onna to kidnap newlywed couples. Snowgon froze Ultraman Jack and tore him into pieces, but the Ultra reforms with his bracelet and summons Ultra Defender to freeze Snowgon with her own power before he destroyed her with a throw. Misako is portrayed by Junko Arai (荒井 純子, Arai Junko).
- Mirage Monster Paragon (蜃気楼怪獣 パラゴン, Shinkirō Kaijū Paragon; 42): Alien Stora's monster, which he uses to create mirage incidents from the top of Mount Fuji in an attempt to force mankind into surrendering Earth. Although initially appeared as a giant, Jack managed to expose the monster being several times smaller and dropped Paragon into Mount Fuji's volcano.
- Phosphorus Monster Granadas (燐光怪獣 グラナダス, Rinkō Kaijū Guranadasu; 44): A monster under Alien Centauros' control. It was sent to attack MAT's Radar Base in order to destroy Kishida's newly developed radar but a lone Kentauros named Akane destroyed the monster with herself after being captivated by mankind's kindness.
- Mouse Monster Robonez (鼠怪獣 ロボネズ, Nezumi Kaijū Robonezu; 45): A robot monster from Messie Nebula, themed after an Earth Mouse. It was the first of Alien Messie's servant to attack Earth and fought Ultraman Jack, using its infectious bite to weaken the Ultra. Robonez was killed by Bracelet Bomb, where it was strapped to an entire mechanical frame.
- Boomerang Monster Red Killer (ブーメラン怪獣 レッドキラー, Būmeran Kaijū Reddo Kirā; 46): The Alien Zooles' monster, armed with a pair of Razor Boomerangs (カミソリブーメラン, Kamisori Būmeran) and capable of exhaling white gas. After faking its defeat from MAT's weapon, Red Killer was ordered by Zoole to kill Go and Toru at a hospital. Using Bracelet Whip, Jack stole the Razor Boomerangs and use them against Red Killer in Ultra Cross Cutting attack.
- Will-o'-the-wisp Monster Femigon (ひとだま怪獣 フェミゴン, Hitodama Kaijū Femigon; 47): A space monster whose true form is a wandering hitodama. It possessed Yuriko Oka at some point of time and caused her create accidents in her job, so much so that she was given a month-long vacation from duty. Femigon then materialized into a monster twice to attack oil complexes; the second one had Jack interfered to fight in both the oil complex and nearing MAT's underwater headquarters. Femigon was killed by the Ultra Spark and return Yuriko to the nearby beach. Due to the private nature of its final fight, Femigon's death was reported differently in Ultraman Mebius; stated to be killed by Jack's Specium Ray.
- Lazy Monster Yametaranse (なまけ怪獣 ヤメタランス, Namake Kaijū Yametaransu; 48): An intelligent space monster from a planet of similar name. Despite its docile nature, Yametaranse is capable of radiating infectious wave that turns its target lazy and grows bigger with everything it eats. The monster was brought to Earth by Sasahiller in hopes of turning mankind lazier. One of its victim was Masaru, a young boy who instead becomes motivated due to his already established laziness. Because of Masaru's help, Jack is able to use his bracelet to shrink the monster to its original size before sending it back to space. He is voiced by Osamu Ichikawa (市川 治, Ichikawa Osamu).

=== Others ===
- Synthetic Monster Leogon (合性怪獣 レオゴン, Gōsei Kaijū Reogon; 34): A monster created by Ichiro Mizuno from combining the DNA of pitcher plant and lizard via Alpha Leon Ray. After being hatched, the monster terrorized the neighborhood area and retreated to a lake, where its already grow to the size of a giant. Ichiro was devoured by Leogon as Jack killed the monster with Ultra Spark.
- Robot Monster Billgamo (ロボット怪獣 ビルガモ, Robotto Kaijū Birugamo; 41): A robot constructed by Alien Baltan Jr., with its lower abdomen fused to a building under construction. Jiro had a friend named Susumu to check on said building after his late brother, Ken, alarmed him of Alien Baltan's arrival. The next day, Jiro and the MAT members were trapped in the building as Billgamo took its form and proceed to destroy the city. With its hostages, Jack is incapable of harming the robot until they escaped and he scrapped Billgamo with 3 Ultra Sparks.
- Demon Monster Kodaigon (魔神怪獣 コダイゴン, Majin Kaijū Kodaigon; 43): Originally the go-shintai of a shrine in Shinshū, the statue was animated by Alien Grotes to attack the village and forced MAT to disband in exchange of the village's safety. Refusing to yield, MAT attacked the animated statue and Jack participated as well, forcing Alien Grotes to participate. Kodaigon returned to its original form after Alien Grotes' death, where Hideki placed it back to the shrine it came from. Its main weapon is an acala. In Ultraman Mebius, the Kodaigon was revealed to be animated because of Grotes Cells. Another Kodaigon was born from said cells infecting an ebisu statue.
- Primitive Underground People King Bockle (原始地底人 キング・ボックル, Genshi Chiteijin Kingu Bokkuru; 50): A race of mankind living 30 meters underground. After being forced to inhabit underground since the past years, their physiology mutated and turn them into creatures depending on sound waves as alternative to their lack of vision. A lone operative targeted Dr. Koizumi in order to keep their race's existence as a secret and killed him through a fake suicide, later pinning the blame to Ueno. While targeting Koizumi's daughter, Chidori (チドリ), Go managed to gather the evidences of Koizumi's murder and free Ueno. Jack thwarted his attempt to kill Chidori and finally killed the enlarged creature with Ultra Spark. With Koizumi's notes, MAT put them into use for their war against the rest of the King Bockle race.
