= Hiroshi Minami =

Hiroshi Minami may refer to:

- Hiroshi Minami (actor) (1928–1989), Japanese actor
- Hiroshi Minami (politician) (1869–1946), Japanese bureaucrat and politician
