= Fireman (TV series) =

- Title card
- Genre: Tokusatsu; Superhero; Kyodai Hero; Kaiju
- Created by: Tsuburaya Productions
- Developed by: Bunzo Wakatsuki
- Directed by: Junkichi Oki
- Starring: Naoya Makoto; Goro Mutsumi; Shin Kishida; Sei Hiraizumi; Keiko Kunihara
- Country of origin: Japan
- No. of episodes: 30

Production
- Running time: 24 minutes (per episode)

Original release
- Network: Nippon Television (NTV)
- Release: January 7 – July 31, 1973

Fireman (ファイヤーマン, Faiyāman), known as Magma Man in some markets, is a Japanese tokusatsu television series about the titular superhero who fights kaiju and other villains. Produced by Tsuburaya Productions, the show was broadcast on Nippon Television from January 7 to July 31, 1973, with a total of 30 episodes. This was also one of several shows Tsuburaya did to celebrate the company's 10th anniversary (the other two being Ultraman Taro and Jumborg Ace).

== Plot ==
A strange phenomenon happened throughout the world, causing giant, mutant dinosaurs to suddenly appear. The people of the Aban continent, living underground for the last 12,000 years sends a courageous young man named Misaki to live as an archeologist and SAF (Scientific Attack Force) agent Daisuke Misaki. Whenever monsters and space aliens attack the world, Misaki transforms into Fireman by using the fire-stick, and defends the human race against them.

== Production ==
Productions of both Fireman and Daigoro vs. Goliath (1972) involved human and physical resources from the Daiei Film, a major film studio which went bankrupt in 1971. The Daiei Tokyo Studio was utilized for their filmings, and expertises and materials from Daiei's tokusatsu productions such as the Gamera franchise were put into practice by former Daiei staffs.

== Cast ==
- Naoya Makoto as Daisuke Misaki / Fireman
- Goro Mutsumi as Dr. Gunpachi Umino
- Shin Kishida as Dr. Saburo Mizusima

Kishida wrote screenplays ep.12 as Shin Akegawa.

- Sei Hiraizumi as Dr. Futoshi Chiba
- Keiko Kunihara as Mariko Hayama
- Mitsuru Saijō as Fireman (Suit Acting)
- Voice of Fireman by Michihiro Ikemizu
- Narrated by Ichirō Murakoshi

== Staff ==
Producers

- Akira Tsuburaya
- Kimihiko Eto (Mannensha)
- Yoshikazu Morita (NTV)

Script

- Bunzo Wakatsuki
- Fumito Imamura
- Toyohiro Ando
- Shin Kishida
- Ikuko Okamoto

Music

- Toru Fuyuki

Theme Song by

- Asei Kobayashi
- Bob Sakuma

Directors of Photography

- Toshiyuki Machida
- Koji Yokote

Lighting

- Masanori Ando

Production Designed by

- Osamu Yamaguchi

Assistant Directors

- Hiroshi Okamoto
- Toshihiko Nakajima

=== VFX Unit ===
Cameraman

- Yuzo Kaneko

Lighting

- Eihachi Kubo
- Yukio Ito
- Nagaharu Watanabe
- Shoichi Uehara
- Masao Ohara
- Shinichi Fujino

Art Directors & Monster Design

- Senkatsu Ikeya, Kazumasa Otani

Assistant Directors

- Shiya Nakamura
- Masao Kobayashi
- Isao Matsumoto
- Masahiro Ito
- Seishiro Kameda
- Setsuo Mizunuma

Wire Operators

- Rumichi Kumazawa, Isamu Morohoshi, Haruo Sekiya

Special Effects

- Masamichi Takayama

VFX

- Minoru Nakano

Scripter Girls

- Yuko Morita
- Isao Matsumoto
- Mayumi Nakamachi
- Masahiro Ito
- Haruyo Matsumaru
- Setsuo Mizunuma
- Seishiro Kameda
- Miyo Tabata

Production Chiefs

- Takahiro Katagiri
- Yukio Ohno
- Masana Takahashi

Editing by

- Toyo Suzuki, Tatsuharu Nakashizuka, Sachiko Yamaji, Junko Yoneuchiyama

Effects

- Akira Kojima, Makoto Ishida

Sound Recording

- Kisaburo Goda, Hideo Okuyama

In Charge of Production

- Masayuki Shitara

Post Production Manager

- Teruyoshi Kokubo

Music Selecting by

- Kiyoshi Suzuki
- Masami Hara

Production Contacting

- Hiroshi Saito

Special Thanks

- Miyazaki Transportation, Nippon Car Ferry Co., Ltd.

Devices

- Isamu Sugimoto

Post Production

- Den Film Effects

Film Processing

- Tokyo Laboratory

Special Technology

- Kazuo Sagawa, Junkichi Oki, Masao Kobayashi, Iwataro Ishii, Shiya Nakamura

Directed by

- Junkichi Oki, Koji Otsuka, Tatsumi Ando, Toshiki Suzuki, Taiji Saeki, Hiromi Higuchi, Hiroshi Okamoto

Produced by

- Tsuburaya Productions
- Mannensha
- Nippon TV

== Songs ==
=== Opening song ===
Fireman (ファイヤーマン, Faiyā-man)

- Lyrics: Yū Aku
- Composition: Asei Kobayashi
- Arrangement: Bob Sakuma
- Artists: Masato Shimon

=== Other songs ===
Shutsugeki! SAF (出撃!SAF, Shutsugeki! Esu-ē-efu; Go attack! SAF)

- Lyrics: Hajime Tsuburaya(as Kyouichi Azuma)
- Composition and Arrangement: Tōru Fuyuki
- Artists: Columbia Yurikago-kai and The Photons

Honō no Youni Moero (炎のようにもえろ; Burn Like The Flame)

- Lyrics: Kyouichi Azuma
- Composition and Arrangement: Tōru Fuyuki
- Artists: Masato Shimon with The Photons

Haruka Aoi Chitei-ni (はるか青い地底に; In the Depths of the Blue Earth)

- Lyrics: Mieko Arima
- Composition and Arrangement: Go Misawa
- Artists: Masato Shimon

== List of episodes ==
1. Birth of Fireman (ファイヤーマン誕生, Faiyāman Tanjō)
2. The Weapon is Science S･A･F (武器は科学だS・A・F, Buki wa Kagaku da Esu-ē-efu)
3. The Mysterious Spaceship (謎の宇宙船, Nazo no Ucyūsen)
4. Destroy the Invaders (インベーダーを撃滅せよ, Inbēdā wo gekimetsu seyo)
5. The Boy Who Fell into the Jurassic Era (ジュラ紀へ落ちた少年, Juraki e ochita shōnen)
6. The Secret of Planet Gomerous (遊星ゴメロスの秘密, Yūsei-Gomerosu no himitsu)
7. The Dreadful Space Bacteria (恐怖の宇宙細菌, Kyōfu no ucyū saikin)
8. The Micro Monster's Fear (ミクロ怪獣の恐怖, Mikuro kaijū no kyōfu)
9. A Challenge from the Deep Sea (深海からの挑戦, Shinkai karano Chōsen)
10. The Iron Monster that Attacked Tokyo (鉄の怪獣が東京を襲った, Tetsu no kaiju ga Tōkyō wo osotta.)
11. Resurrecting the Rock Monster (よみがえる岩石怪獣, Yomigaeru ganseki kaijū)
12. Earth is the Robot's Graveyard (地球はロボットの墓場, Chikyū wa robotto no hakaba.)
13. Fear of the Dragon God Swamp (竜神沼の恐怖, Ryūjin-numa no kyōfu)
14. Run Through the Devil's Sea (悪魔の海を突っ走れ, Akuma no umi wo tsuppashire)
15. Planet Beldar M13 Command (ベルダー星M13号指令, Berudā-sei emu-jūsan shirei)
16. Steal it! The Fire-Stick (奪え! ファイヤースティック, Ubae! Faiyā-sutekku)
17. Fireman Disappeared into the Magma (マグマに消えたファイヤーマン, Maguma ni kieta Faiyāman)
18. He Did It! Fire-Dash (やったぞ! ファイヤーダッシュ, Yattazo! Faiyā-dassyu)
19. The Space Monster vs. the Primeval Monster (宇宙怪獣対原始怪獣, Ucyū kaijū tai genshi kaijū)
20. The Gagango Monster's Storm (怪獣ガガンゴの嵐, Kaijū Gagango no arashi)
21. Messengers of Murder, Dekon and Bokon (殺しの使者デコンとボコン, Koroshi no shisya Dekon to Bokon)
22. It Has Arrived!! The Transformed Alien (来たぞ!! 変身宇宙人, Kitazo! henshin Ucyūjin)
23. Kill Fireman! (ファイヤーマンを殺せ!, Faiyāman wo korose!)
24. The Harmonica Crying in the Night (夜になくハーモニカ, Yoru ni naku hāmonika)
25. The Alien with No Home Planet (帰る星なき宇宙人, Kaeru hoshi naki Ucyūjin)
26. The Secret of the Mountain Shining in the Evening Sun (夕日に光る岩山の秘密, Yūhi ni hikaru iwayama no himitsu)
27. The Space Leader that Manipulates Corpses (死人をあやつる宇宙の支配者, Shinin wo ayatsuru Ucyū no shihaisya)
28. The Boy that Came from the Planet Argon (アルゴン星から来た少年, Arugon-sei kara kita shōnen)
29. Don't Shoot! Even Though He's A Monster, He's Still My Friend (射つな! 怪獣だって友達だ, Utsuna! Kaijū datte tomodachi da)
30. Fireman Disappears into Space (宇宙に消えたファイヤーマン, Ucyū ni kieta Faiyāman)
