= New Battles Without Honor and Humanity (1974 film) =

1974 Japanese film by Kinji Fukasaku

- Theatrical release poster
- Directed by: Kinji Fukasaku
- Written by: Fumio Konami; Misao Arai
- Produced by: Goro Kusakabe
- Starring: Bunta Sugawara; Tomisaburo Wakayama; Nobuo Kaneko; Kunie Tanaka; Hiroki Matsukata
- Narrated by: Satoshi "Tetsu" Sakai
- Cinematography: Sadaji Yoshida
- Edited by: Shintaro Miyamoto
- Music by: Toshiaki Tsushima
- Distributed by: Toei
- Release date: December 28, 1974
- Running time: 98 minutes
- Country: Japan
- Language: Japanese
- Box office: ¥391,000,000

New Battles Without Honor and Humanity (Japanese: 新仁義なき戦い, Hepburn: Shin Jingi Naki Tatakai) is a 1974 Japanese yakuza film directed by Kinji Fukasaku. It begins a new series of films with unrelated plots, based on the director's earlier Battles Without Honor and Humanity pentalogy. New Battles Without Honor and Humanity: The Boss's Head followed in 1975 and New Battles Without Honor and Humanity: Last Days of the Boss in 1976.

== Plot ==
In 1950, Makio Miyoshi, a member of the Yamamori Family, attempts to assassinate the boss of the rival Asada Family in public, but flees before finishing the job. That evening, he meets with his boss, Yoshio Yamamori, who berates him for his failure. Two other Yamamori Family members, lieutenant Naotake Aoki and senior officer Shigeru Nanba, arrive to collect Yamamori and provide Makio with a clean gun to kill Boss Asada. Makio then allows himself to be arrested for his crime and is sentenced to eight years in prison.

Nine years later, Makio is visited by both Yamamori and Aoki and learns that the family is divided, with Yamamori claiming that Aoki is jealous of his success and wants to seize power for himself, and Aoki countering the boss's accusations by revealing that Yamamori raped his girlfriend while he was serving time several years earlier and arguing that he is too old and useless to lead the family. Makio makes parole and Yamamori instructs his nephew Kenji to provide Makio with a room and a monthly salary, and sends several yakuza, including Makio's childhood friend Noburo Kitami, to protect him. Makio correctly suspects that all of these gifts are intended to win his favor. When the whole family visits to celebrate Makio's release, Yamamori and his wife resort to bribing Makio to kill Aoki, but he refuses, stating that Aoki is his blood brother and he will not harm him.

However, news then arrives from Kure that Aoki's men have assassinated Nanba, allowing Aoki to take his place as blood brother to Hiroshima boss Unokichi Kaizu. Aoki also intends to have Nanba's subordinate Masuo Nozaki, who is loyal to him, succeed Nanba against the wishes of many Nanba Family members, who instead turn to Makio's old cellmate, Masaru Seki. Makio, accompanied by his girlfriend Keiko, visits Aoki to assess the situation. Aoki's wife convinces Keiko that Makio plans to kill her husband, and they have a violent argument that ends with Keiko scarring Makio with a knife and leaving him. Aoki himself asks Makio to leave the family; when he refuses, he arranges for a hitman to kill Makio while he's distracted by a prostitute. Makio escapes with his life, and convinces Aoki to give him money so he can travel to Shikoku and swear loyalty to another family, implying that he no longer cares what happens to Yamamori.

An emboldened Aoki moves against his enemies, humiliating Yamamori and forcing him to dissolve his family, and having Nozaki order a hit on Seki, who winds up hospitalized with severe injuries. Yamamori persuades one of his former family members, Gen Sakagami, to approach Makio with a plan to assassinate Aoki with the help of Seki's loyal crew. Makio agrees to break off his blood oath with Aoki, thus ending his obligation to protect him, but refuses to help otherwise. The hit, scheduled to take place during a ceremony to name Nozaki as Nanba's successor, fails when the police suddenly arrive to take Nozaki into custody for attacking Seki. The crew loses their nerve and force Gen to promise that Makio will kill Aoki instead.

Enraged, Makio concocts a new plan. He has Kitami visit Seki's men to intimidate them into taking action, tells Gen that he will be responsible for setting a trap for Aoki, and offers his finger to Kaizu in return for a promise that his family will not interfere. The next morning, Aoki sits down to a meal with Gen before assassins shoot up the restaurant; his bodyguards fight them off while a badly wounded Aoki tries to run. Seki, having left the hospital in secret, confronts a dying Aoki and shoots him, which Kitami witnesses and reports to Makio. Yamamori celebrates his return to power, and promotes Makio for his loyal service. The film ends by stating that Makio went on to play a key role in a major gang war that broke out in 1963.

== Cast ==
- Bunta Sugawara as Makio Miyoshi
- Tomisaburo Wakayama as Naotake Aoki
- Nobuo Kaneko as Yoshio Yamamori
- Kunie Tanaka as Gen Sakagami
- Hiroki Matsukata as Masaru Seki
- Tsunehiko Watase as Noburo Kitami
- Reiko Ike as Keiko
- Sanae Nakahara as Rika Yamamori
- Jo Shishido as Hachiro Tachibana
- Hideo Murota as Masuo Nozaki
- Gorō Mutsumi as Tetsuo Urabe
- Noboru Ando as Unokichi Kaizu
- Ichirō Nakatani as Shigeru Nanba
- Shingo Yamashiro as Kenji Yamamori
- Ichitaro Kuni as Hisao Maeda
- Hiroshi Nawa as Masanori Ogata
- Naoya Makoto as Tadashi
- Kin Sugai as Tadashi's mother
- Yoko Koizumi as Yumi
- Yasuhiro Suzuki as Hiroto Asada
- Takuzo Kawatani as a Nanba family member
- Nobuo Yana as an Aoki family member
- Ryo Nishida as a Nanba family member
- Kyoichi Sato as an Aoki family member
- Ryuji Katagiri as a Nanba family member

== Production ==
Following the success of the original five-part Battles Without Honor and Humanity series, Toei asked director Kinji Fukasaku to create another installment and he quickly agreed. Fukasaku biographer and film expert Sadao Yamane believes the director did not agree chiefly for the money, but because he was glad audiences liked them. New Battles Without Honor and Humanity features many of the same performers from the previous series in new roles. The only actor playing the same role is Nobuo Kaneko as family boss Yoshio Yamamori.

Yamane feels that New Battles Without Honor and Humanity clearly uses the previous five films as a template, with lead actor Bunta Sugawara playing "more or less the same character", although he called Makio Miyoshi more of a "reckless punk" without "much depth." He also stated that Tomisaburo Wakayama's character is the same role that Hiroki Matsukata played in the original 1973 film. In Yamane's opinion, the biggest difference between the old series and the new one is that women are featured more in the story. Put simply, he also said that the original series was about Japan having lost the war and the chaos and confusion as its youth fought to survive, whereas that zeitgeist is not seen at all in the new trilogy.

Dialogue spoken by Wakayama's character about Reiko Ike's character in a scene approximately 53 minutes into the film is censored in the original 35 mm negative and all digital copies. Toei said that the brief audio included discriminatory language about Koreans which was "frowned upon at the time," and censored prior to the film's original theatrical release in 1974.

== Release ==
Arrow Films released a limited edition Blu-ray and DVD box set of all three films in the UK on August 21, 2017, and in the US on August 29, 2017. Special features include an appreciation video by Fukasaku biographer Sadao Yamane.
