= New Battles Without Honor and Humanity: The Boss's Head =

1975 Japanese film by Kinji Fukasaku

- Theatrical release poster
- Directed by: Kinji Fukasaku
- Written by: Susumu Saji; Yozo Tanaka; Koji Takada
- Produced by: Goro Kusakabe; Keiichi Hashimoto; Kyo Namura
- Starring: Bunta Sugawara; Meiko Kaji; Tsutomu Yamazaki
- Narrated by: Satoshi "Tetsu" Sakai
- Cinematography: Tōru Nakajima
- Edited by: Kozo Horiike
- Music by: Toshiaki Tsushima
- Distributed by: Toei
- Release date: November 1, 1975
- Running time: 94 minutes
- Country: Japan
- Language: Japanese

New Battles Without Honor and Humanity: The Boss's Head (Japanese: 新仁義なき戦い 組長の首, Hepburn: Shin Jingi Naki Tatakai: Kumicho no Kubi) is a 1975 Japanese yakuza film directed by Kinji Fukasaku. The film details the internal conflicts between members of the Owada family on the Kyushu side of the Kanmon Straits. It is the unrelated sequel to New Battles Without Honor and Humanity (1974) and was followed by the third and final unrelated film in the series, New Battles Without Honor and Humanity: Last Days of the Boss (1976).

== Plot ==
In June 1968, Shuji Kuroda, a petty criminal, agrees to take responsibility for the murder of yakuza Iwao Masaki, head of the Kyoei Group, on behalf of Tetsuya Kusunoki, son-in-law of boss Tokuji Owada, but Kusunoki, strung out on heroin, is unable to perform the hit. Kuroda is forced to do it himself and gets a seven-year sentence for murder. In prison, he fights off a group of inmates attempting to rape fellow inmate Katsuo Shimura and befriends him. When Kuroda is released, Shimura, who already finished his sentence, greets him along with another young man who gives his name as Akira Kobayashi; the two promise their loyalty to Kuroda as they both wish to become yakuza. Kuroda returns to Kyushu and finds that Kusunoki has been abandoned by the Owada Family due to his worsening addiction. They visit the family's headquarters to request the five million yen Kuroda is owed for serving Kusunoki's sentence, but Owada refuses to keep his word, shifting responsibility to the penniless Kusunoki.

Kusunoki and Kuroda abduct Owada and his mistress Shinako, threatening to kill her unless Owada honors the deal. The next day, Owada Family officer Shigehiko Aihara meets with Kuroda and gives him a large parcel of heroin, telling him to sell it to Owada's sworn brother Takeo Akamatsu while he comes up with the rest of the money. Kuroda goes to see Akamatsu and recognizes his girlfriend Aya as the same woman he saw kissing Aihara in a hotel earlier. Akamatsu's men steal the heroin and badly beat Shimura, leading an enraged Kobayashi to stab Akamatsu to death in revenge before the yakuza's bodyguard kills him. Aihara steps in, agreeing to protect Kuroda from retaliation until the dispute is settled.

Kuroda receives the full five million, with Aihara explaining away his actions by claiming that he wanted to assassinate Akamatsu for trying to leave the family without Owada's consent. Kuroda demands extra compensation and Owada agrees to pay for Kobayashi's funeral and induct Kuroda and Shimura into his family. A few days later, Aihara takes Owada, Kuroda, and other family members to a club he owns that is being managed by Aya, who is now his mistress. Owada's "older brother" Asajiro Nozaki, boss of the Nozaki Family of Osaka, arrives and pressures the aging Owada to retire and name a successor. Owada surprises everyone by naming Seiji Izeki as his successor rather than Aihara. He and Izeki then swear individual oaths of brotherhood with Kuroda.

Owada later visits his daughter Misako at her husband Kusunoki's bar and asks her to live with him once he retires. Misako refuses, but when she throws out the rest of Kusunoki's heroin stash, he hits her and she runs to her father. Aihara and his men pick up Kusunoki with orders to shoot him and dump his body under a bridge. However, Aihara instead tells Kusunoki that Owada plans to marry Misako off to Kuroda and that he deserves payback for the way his father-in-law treats him. Kusunoki is given a pistol and goes to Owada's house, where he shoots his boss in cold blood but collapses from physical exhaustion before he can kill Kuroda. The family covers up the incident by arranging for him to be put in an insane asylum.

At Owada's funeral, Nozaki convinces the weak-willed Izeki that because he has neither the money nor the temperament to be boss, he should nominate Aihara in his place. The officers, who all hate Kuroda, decide to kill him, but when Izeki protests, Nozaki and Aihara order him to break off his oath with Kuroda and oversee his expulsion from the family. Kuroda accepts his expulsion but swears revenge, asking Aya for help killing Aihara. Through a phone call, he learns that Aihara will be traveling to Osaka and recruits Shimura and Sugawa, a family member who opposes Aihara's power grab, to back him up.

The group follows Aihara's motorcade, staging an unsuccessful ambush on the highway before being lured into a trap and having to shoot their way out. Aihara reaches Osaka and goes into hiding before learning that a man calling himself "Kuroda" (really an injured Sugawa) has been arrested for carrying an illegal weapon. Believing he's safe, Aihara lets his guard down and attends a party thrown by Nozaki in his honor. Shimura, posing as a guest, approaches Aihara and guns him down before being shot dead. Kuroda contacts Izeki and instructs him to step in as the new boss. Izeki then gives Aihara's former position in the family to Kuroda.

== Cast ==
- Bunta Sugawara as Shuji Kuroda
- Mikio Narita as Shigehiko Aihara
- Tsutomu Yamazaki as Tetsuya Kusunoki
- Kō Nishimura as Tokuji Owada
- Tsunehiko Watase as Kunimitsu Sugawa
- Junkichi Orimoto as Seiji Izeki
- Yuriko Hishimi as Aya
- Meiko Kaji as Misako
- Nenji Kobayashi as Katsuo Shimura
- Kan Mikami as Shigeru Sasaki, a.k.a. "Akira Kobayashi"
- Asao Uchida as Asajiro Nozaki
- Gorō Mutsumi as Otone Takamatsu
- Hideo Murota as Takeo Akamatsu
- Nobuo Yana as Miyai
- Seizō Fukumoto as Matsumoto
- Takuzo Kawatani as an Osaka detective
- Sanae Nakahara as Shinako
- Masako Araki as Sasaki's mother
- Michimaro Otabe as Iwao Misaki
- Shinichi Chiba as an Osaka bartender (uncredited cameo appearance)

== Production ==
With the success of New Battles Without Honor and Humanity, another installment was created. Fukasaku biographer and film expert Sadao Yamane feels that unlike that film, The Boss's Head features no relation to the original five-part series, but tells an original story set in a different period. Put simply, he said that the original series was about Japan having lost the war and the chaos and confusion that resulted as its youth fought to survive, whereas that zeitgeist is not seen at all in the new trilogy. Yamane said that this film and its followup, Last Days of the Boss, both have women involved and realistic "car action." Screenwriter Koji Takada stated that The Boss's Head has aspects of some real incidents but is otherwise "total fiction."

Takada said that Fukasaku was unsatisfied with the first installment in the new series, and that screenwriters Susumu Saji and Yozo Tanaka could not deliver what he wanted for its sequel. He said he was brought in to work on the script at producer Goro Kusakabe's suggestion when Fukasaku was at his wit's end with Saji and Tanaka, who had given up and were relaxing, playing mahjong, and drinking. Takada suggested that Tanaka was recruited specifically to add strong female characters to the story. He said he rewrote most of what was written, but left several "Tanaka-style" lines and scenes for Yuriko Hishimi. The drug-addicted character of Tetsuya Kusunoki, played by Tsutomu Yamazaki, was already in the script before Takada got involved. He said it is rare to see a character with a drug addiction in a big role and that he personally does not like writing characters like that, but Yamazaki was able to pull off the performance. To Takada's recollection, they all spent less than a week at an inn in Itagaki writing.

== Release ==
Arrow Films released a limited edition Blu-ray and DVD box set of all three films in the UK on August 21, 2017, and in the US on August 29, 2017. Special features include interviews with screenwriter Koji Takada and an appreciation video by Fukasaku biographer Sadao Yamane.
