= New Battles Without Honor and Humanity: Last Days of the Boss =

1976 Japanese film by Kinji Fukasaku

- Theatrical release poster
- Directed by: Kinji Fukasaku
- Written by: Koji Takada
- Produced by: Goro Kusakabe; Keiichi Hashimoto; Kyo Namura
- Starring: Bunta Sugawara; Chieko Matsubara; Koji Wada
- Narrated by: Satoshi "Tetsu" Sakai
- Cinematography: Toru Nakajima
- Edited by: Isamu Ichita
- Music by: Toshiaki Tsushima
- Distributed by: Toei
- Release date: April 24, 1976
- Running time: 91 minutes
- Country: Japan
- Language: Japanese

New Battles Without Honor and Humanity: Last Days of the Boss (Japanese: 新仁義なき戦い 組長最後の日, Hepburn: Shin Jingi Naki Tatakai: Kumicho Saigo no Hi) is a 1976 Japanese yakuza film directed by Kinji Fukasaku. It is the third and final film in a series of films with unrelated plotlines, following New Battles Without Honor and Humanity (1974) and New Battles Without Honor and Humanity: The Boss's Head (1975).

== Plot ==
A minor dispute between Osaka's Yonemoto family and Amagasaki's Kawahara family over the murder of a drug dealer grows into a major conflict when gunmen from the Genryukai, an alliance of several Kyushu gangs including the Kawahara family, murder several members of the Sakamoto family, the yakuza syndicate to which the Yonemoto family belongs. During a birthday celebration for Chairman Hidematsu Sakamoto, the clan's officers discuss what to do and agree that they must kill a boss of the Genryukai to avenge the deaths of their men.

Shuichi Nozaki is an associate of the Iwaki family who manages a small marine supply company and shares a father-son relationship with Boss Iwaki, who is preparing him to assume control of the family once he retires. At a party thrown by the leaders of the Genryukai at a rural inn, Iwaki is stabbed to death by an assassin disguised as a female masseuse, which the others quickly realize was ordered by the Sakamoto family. Nozaki voluntarily agrees to assume Iwaki's position as boss, but insists that he be allowed to take revenge first. He hires Joe, a Korean hitman, to hide in Boss Yonemoto's house and kill him. However, the Sakamoto family surprise their Genryukai counterparts by requesting a meeting, offering to meditate the conflict peacefully. Nozaki is told to stand down, which he agrees to reluctantly.

At the meeting, Sakamoto officer Matsuoka proposes that the two sides form an alliance, on the sole condition that anyone holding a senior rank be protected from further retaliation. News then arrives that Yonemoto's mistress was killed in a shootout between Joe and a Yonemoto soldier who he mistook for his target, causing an uproar and forcing the Genryukai bosses to hastily agree to the alliance. Nozaki is summoned and informed that he must end his vendetta at once; furious, he declares that rather than just settle for killing Yonemoto, he will see to it that Chairman Sakamoto dies instead. His men stage an ambush on Sakamoto's personal convoy, but the hit is unsuccessful. Boss Yonemoto turns himself in to keep Sakamoto from being arrested, and the Genryukai agree to have Nozaki killed for breaking their agreement.

Nozaki is finally injured and caught by the police during a second failed attempt to kill Sakamoto in an airport. Nozaki recovers in the hospital while Sakamoto is being hidden in the airport hotel during his recovery. Nozaki's sister Asami offers herself to Shinkichi in return for his aid in helping Nozaki escape from the hospital before he is sent to jail. With his aid Nozaki escapes, but when they reach the airport hotel Shinkichi is shot dead. Nozaki reaches Sakamoto's room and finds him already nearly dead but shoots him anyway. He surrenders to the police and as he is being led away he is stabbed in the stomach by one of Sakamoto's loyal men. Nozaki is driven away looking at his own bloody hands in handcuffs.

== Cast ==
- Bunta Sugawara as Shuichi Nozaki
- Kōji Wada as Tsutomu Nakamichi
- Chieko Matsubara as Asami Nakamichi
- Isao Bito as Shinkichi Kuwata
- Takuya Fujioka as Yonemoto
- Eitaro Ozawa as Hidemitsu Sakamoto
- Mikio Narita as Koji Matsuoka
- Kenichi Sakuragi as Akira Nishimoto
- Rie Yokoyama as Misuzu Konaka
- Hiroshi Nawa as Funada
- Jun Tatara as Iwaki
- Michiro Minami as Genji Kawahara
- Eiji Gō as Joe
- Sakae Umezu as Tokichi
- Sanae Nakahara as Hisano
- Takeo Chii as Matsuzo Sakagawa
- Masataka Iwao as Nakahara
- Nobuo Yana as Nemoto
- Harumi Sone as Shoji
- Rinichi Yamamoto as Kurihara
- Junkichi Orimoto as Motoyama Takao
- Kan Mikami as Tah-bo
- Koji Nanjo as Isao Shikada
- Ryo Nishida as a Nozaki family member
- Takuzo Kawatani as Kazunari Tsugawa
- Ryuji Katagiri as Tanaka

== Production ==
Fukasaku biographer and film expert Sadao Yamane feels that, unlike New Battles Without Honor and Humanity, Last Days of the Boss is like The Boss's Head and features no relation to the original five-part series, but tells an original story. Put simply, he said that the original series was about Japan having lost the war and the chaos and confusion as its youth fought to survive. Whereas that zeitgeist is not seen at all in the new trilogy. Yamane said that with the characters played by Bunta Sugawara and Chieko Matsubara, Last Days of the Boss has a very different atmosphere than yakuza action movies. Another trait it has in common with its direct predecessor, is that both have women involved and realistic "car action."

But unlike The Boss's Head, screenwriter Koji Takada did not have to work with a story someone else had already written and was able to write what he wanted. Takada said that he fulfilled one of his "cinematic wishes" to show a top boss finally get assassinated in a film, noting that it was never seen up to that point. While looking for ideas, someone suggested to him real stories; one set in a coal mine in Kyushu and another where a policeman's gun was stolen and murders committed with it. He initially combined them into a story about a brother and sister whose parents are trapped in a mining accident and a policeman helps them look for them. Years later, the policeman is killed and his pistol stolen. The brother joins the yakuza in order to find the killer, and learns that it is his sister's lover. But this was scrapped when stories about an unidentified female body being found and cafe murders committed by members of the Matsuda yakuza family in Osaka were reported in newspapers and subsequently included in the film. However, several elements of the abandoned coal mine idea are seen with Sugawara and Matsubara's characters in the film. Although he wanted to go further with the siblings' incestuous love for each other, Takada said Goro Kusakabe and the other producers told him not to.

Takada revealed that, after a pre-release screening of The Boss's Head, Fukasaku told him that they had "failed this time", something Takada disagrees with. The writer also said he believes Sugawara gave his best performance out of all the Battles films.

== Release ==
Arrow Films released a limited edition Blu-ray and DVD box set of all three films in the UK on August 21, 2017, and in the US on August 29, 2017. Special features include interviews with screenwriter Koji Takada and an appreciation video by Fukasaku biographer Sadao Yamane.
