= Bohachi Bushido: Code of the Forgotten Eight =

1973 film directed by Teruo Ishii

- Film poster
- Directed by: Teruo Ishii
- Written by: Susumu Saji
- Based on: Poruno jidaigeki: Bōhachi bushidō by: Kazuo Koike; Goseki Kojima
- Starring: Tetsurō Tamba; Yuriko Hishimi; Gorō Ibuki
- Cinematography: Jūhei Suzuki
- Edited by: Isamu Ichida
- Music by: Hajime Kaburagi
- Distributed by: Toei
- Release date: February 3, 1973 (Japan)
- Running time: 81 minutes
- Country: Japan
- Language: Japanese

Bohachi Bushido: Code of the Forgotten Eight (Japanese: ポルノ時代劇 忘八武士道, Hepburn: Poruno jidaigeki: Bōhachi bushidō) is a 1973 Japanese ero guro jidaigeki film directed by Teruo Ishii. and distributed by Toei. The film was adapted from the manga Bōhachi bushidō.

== Synopsis ==
Shinō Ashita is an assassin. One day he is surrounded by enemies during a battle and tries to commit suicide but he is rescued by a clan known as the Bōhachi.

== Cast ==
- Tetsurō Tamba : Shinō Ashita
- Gorō Ibuki : Kesazō
- Yuriko Hishimi : Omon
- Tatsuo Endō : Shirobei Daimon
- Shōki Fukae : Sanjirō Kada
- Takuzo Kawatani : Kurosukimono
- Rena Ichinose : Otoki
- Ruriko Ikeshima : Okō
- Kimiji Harada : Kinroku
- Kyōichi Satō : Kanroku
- Shirō Kuno : Kanji
- Ryōhei Uchida : Kurosuki no Kokaku
