= Yuriko Hishimi =

Japanese actress (born 1947)

Yuriko Hishimi (ひし美 ゆり子, Hishimi Yuriko; born June 10, 1947 in Tokyo, Japan) is a Japanese actress. In 1965, she signed a contract with Toho. Following year, she made her film debut in Taifu to Zakuro. She portrayed Anne Yuri in the Japanese television series Ultra Seven (1967–1968) and subsequent appearances in other Ultra Series film and television and projects.

== Filmography ==
=== Film ===
- 1966: Taifu to Zakuro as Yasuko Nagase
- 1967: Gō! Gō! Wakadaishō
- 1969: Koi ni mezameru koro as Keiko
- 1970: Bravo! Wakadaishō
- 1972: Godzilla vs. Gigan as Tomoko Tomoe
- 1973: Kôkôsei burai hikae: Tsuki no Muramasa as Yôko Kochiya
- 1973: Kôkôsei burai hikae: Kanjirû Muramasa
- 1973: Sân ike kangôku: kyo akû han
- 1973: Bohachi Bushido: Code of the Forgotten Eight
- 1974: Imôto as Student
- 1974: Mesu as Sato
- 1975: Kôshoku: Genroku (maruhi) monogatari as Onatsu
- 1975: New Battles Without Honor and Humanity: The Boss's Head
- 1979: Ôgon no inu as Misa
- 1997: Ultraman Zearth 2 as Anne Yuri
- 2006: Ultraman Mebius & Ultraman Brothers as Anne Yuri
- 2007: Shin onna tachiguishi retsuden
- 2008: Superior Ultraman 8 Brothers as Anne Yuri
- 2008: The Sky Crawlers as Yuri
- 2008: Daikessen! Chô urutora 8 kyôdai as Anne
- 2013: Intâmisshon
- 2016: Kôtei ni kochi fuite

=== TV ===
- 1967: Ultra Seven as Anne Yuri
- 1972: Mirrorman as Yuko Naruse
- 1973-74: playgirl
- 1974: Ultraman Leo as Anne Yuri
- 1984: Hissatsu Shikirinin as Okatsu
- 1994: Heisei Ultra Seven as Anne Yuri
- 2007: Ultraseven X as Anne Yuri
