= Mighty Jack =

Television program

- Created by: Eiji Tsuburaya
- Directed by: Kazuho Mitsuta; Samaji Nonagase; Tsuneo Kobayashi
- Starring: Hideaki Nitani; Hiroshi Minami; Eijirō Yanagi
- Narrated by: Shinji Nakae
- Composers: Isao Tomita; Kunio Miyauchi
- Country of origin: Japan
- No. of episodes: 13

Production
- Producer: Yasuyoshi Itō
- Running time: 45 minutes (per episode)
- Production company: Tsuburaya Productions

Original release
- Network: Fuji Television
- Release: April 6 – June 29, 1968

Mighty Jack (マイティジャック, Maiti Jakku) is a tokusatsu science fiction/espionage/action TV series. Created by Japanese effects director Eiji Tsuburaya, the show was produced by Tsuburaya Productions and was broadcast on Fuji TV from April 6, 1968 to June 29, 1968, with a total of 13 one-hour episodes. The music for the episodes was done by Isao Tomita and Kunio Miyauchi.

Reportedly, Eiji Tsuburaya considered this series his masterwork because the focus was on the people, rather than on the vehicles and special effects (the show never had any monsters or aliens, as his more famous shows Ultra Q, Ultraman and Ultra Seven did). This focus on the people was similar to the works of Gerry Anderson, of which Tsuburaya was a big fan. The Mighty Jack mecha/HQ featured in this series also has some similarities to Tsuburaya's previous TV masterpiece, Ultra Seven.

Even for the original series of 13 one hour-long episodes, the ratings were low. The follow-up series, Fight! Mighty Jack, fared better in the ratings, perhaps because of its inclusion of monsters and aliens, rather than purely human evildoers like Q.

The insignia of the titular heroic spy team has also become the current logo for Tsuburaya Productions.

== Plot ==
"Mighty Jack" is the name of both a top-secret international peacekeeping organization's 11 agents, and the technologically advanced flying submarine "Mighty-Gō" they use to fight the plots of the terrorist organization "Q".

== Cast ==
- Hideaki Nitani
- Hiroshi Minami
- Naoko Kubo
- Akiyoshi Kasuga
- Wakako Ikeda
- Masanari Nihei
- Hideyo Amamoto
- Seigo Fukuoka
- Yoshitaka Tanaka
- Noriaka Inoue
- Mitsuru Ōya
- Gorō Mutsumi
- Annu Mari
- Eijirō Yanagi

== Episodes ==
Episode	Title
1	THE MAN WHO HAD DISAPPEARED IN PARIS
2	RECAPTURE: K52
3	THE ROSE IS BURNING
4	O, MOTHERLAND BE FOREVER!!
5	SCALPEL AND LIPSTICK
6	STEAMED ICEBERGS
7	DONT SEE THE MOON!!
8	AWESOME AURORA
9	GUIDE TO HELL
10	BOMBING ORDERS
11	BURNING GOLD
12	TERROR OF THE BIG CITY
13	OPERATION: STRANGE AIRSHIP

== Fight! Mighty Jack ==
After the decline in ratings from the first season, Fuji Television believed the relatively dark tone was far removed from Tsuburaya Production's usual work, and ordered a revamp of the show to make it more child-friendly, such as the removal of espionage elements and addition of giant monsters. The more comical sequel series, Fight! Mighty Jack (戦え！マイティジャック, Tatakae! Maiti Jakku), aired on the same network from July 6 to December 28, 1968, with a total of 26 half-hour episodes, equaling the original in length.

This series has several humorous references to the early Ultra Series.

- The opening scene of the series (with a reverse paint-swirling effect forming "MJ" before a burst of red envelops the scene, with a yellow "Fight! Mighty Jack" superimposed) is almost exactly like that of Ultraman
- One episode of this series is quite notable, as it features a comical guest appearance by Kohji Moritsugu, who played Dan Moroboshi, the alter-ego of Ultra Seven, poking fun at his popular role. He plays a mechanic, who, in one scene, looked as though he was about to transform into Ultra Seven by pulling the Ultra Eye from his pocket to put it on, but the red object he slowly pulls from his pocket is actually a small wrench, with which he gets right to work on fixing a machine.

== Mighty Jack in the U.S. ==
In 1986, American producer Sandy Frank took the first and sixth episodes of Mighty Jack (without any of the episodes that were released in between or afterward) and combined them into a dubbed feature-length film of the same name. The movie gained its widest exposure in the United States when it was shown as a Mystery Science Theater 3000 episode on Comedy Central (originally shown on the UHF station KTMA TV 23 during the show's KTMA season).
