= Kan Mikami =

Japanese musician and actor (born 1950)

- Born: Kan Mikami; March 20, 1950 (age 76)
- Origin: Aomori, Japan
- Genres: Folk, blues
- Occupations: Singer, songwriter
- Years active: 1971–present

Kan Mikami (三上 寛, Mikami Kan; born March 20, 1950) is a Japanese folk singer-songwriter and actor. His music, heavily influenced by American blues, was popular in Japan in the 1970s. He re-wrote the lyric of the song "Yume wa Yoru Hiraku" for his cover version in 1972, which was banned for its negative portrayal of modern Japanese culture. Mikami also acted in cinema and is notable for collaborations with Shūji Terayama and his avant-garde theater Tenjō Sajiki. His autobiography, A Life in Folk, was translated into English and published in 2017 by Public Bath Press of Nara, Japan.

== Discography ==
- Mikami Kan no Sekai (三上寛の世界) (1971)
- '71 Nakatsukawa Zen Nippon Foku Janborī Jikkyō('71中津川全日本フォークジャンボリー実況) (1971)
- Mikami Kan no Hitori Goto (三上寛のひとりごと) (1972)
- Hiraku Yume Nado Aru Ja Nashi (ひらく夢などあるじゃなし / 三上寛怨歌集) (1972)
- Mikami Kan 1972 Konsāto Raivu "Rekōdo" (三上寛1972コンサートライヴ"零孤徒") (1972)
- Sentōkouta / Mikami Kan Enka no Sekai (船頭小唄 / 三上寛えん歌の世界) (1973)
- Bang! (1974)
- Aoi Honō (青い炎) (1975)
- Kan (寛) (1975)
- Yūyake no Kioku kara / Mikami Kan Aomori Raivu (夕焼けの記憶から / 三上寛・青森ライヴ) (1977)
- Makeru Toki mo Aru Darō (負けるときもあるだろう) (1978)
- Mikami Kan Raivu Nakatsukawa Zen Nippon Fōku Janborī '71 (三上寛ライヴ・中津川全日本フォークジャンボリー'71) (1979)
- Baby (1981)
- Kono Rekōdo wo Nusume!! Hatsu Mikami Kan Besuto Arubamu (このレコードを盗め!! 初三上寛ベストアルバム) (1982)
- Heisei Gannen Raivu (Kami Shimo) (平成元年ライヴ（上・下）) (1990)
- Ore ga Iru. (俺が居る。) (1991)
- Joyū (女優) (1992)
- USE (1993)
- Shichi Gatsu no Eiketsu(七月の英傑)(1994)
- Gofuchi (御縁) (1994)
- Jazz Sono Ta (Jazz・その他) (1995)
- Sunayama 963 (砂山963) (1996)
- Tōge no Shōnin (峠の商人) (1997)
- Arashi Ame Arashi (アラシ・雨・アラシ) (1997)
- Nanbu Shiki (南部式) (1999)
- 13/4,900,089,658 (四拾九億八万九千六百五拾八分の拾参)(2000)
- Resubosu(レスボス)(2002)
- 1979 (2003)
- 1973 ~ 1992 Hoi (一九七三～一九九二 補遺)(2005)
- Kanryū Hatsu no Kankoku Raivu 2006 (寛流・初の韓国ライブ2006) (2006)
- Hoeru Renshū // Hakusen (吠える練習//白線) (2007)
- Jū (十) (2008)

== Filmography ==
- Pastoral: To Die in the Country (1974)
- New Battles Without Honor and Humanity: The Boss's Head (1975)
- New Battles Without Honor and Humanity: Last Days of the Boss (1976)
- Merry Christmas, Mr. Lawrence (1983)
- Baby Elephant Story: The Angel Who Descended to Earth (1986)
- Wiseguy (2020)
