= Takuzo Kawatani =

Japanese actor (1941–1995)

- Born: 21 July 1941; Shinkyō, Manchukou
- Died: 22 December 1995 (aged 54)
- Occupation: Actor
- Years active: 1967–1995

Takuzo Kawatani (川谷拓三; 21 July 1941 – 22 December 1995) was a Japanese film actor. He appeared in 56 films between 1967 and 1995. He was most famous for playing villains.

== Selected filmography ==
=== Film ===
- Zoku ô-oku maruhi monogatari (1967)
- Eleven Samurai (1967)
- Bakuchi-uchi: Nagurikomi (1968) - Umekichi
- Kaettekita gokudô (1968)
- Tosei-nin Retsuden (1969)
- Gokuaku bôzu: nenbutsu hitokiri tabi (1969)
- Hitokiri kannon-uta (1970)
- Nihon jokyo-den: tekka geisha (1970)
- Onna toseinin (1971) - Jihei
- Gokuaku bozu - Nomu utsu kau (1971)
- Gendai poruno-den: Sentensei inpu (1971) - Doi
- Hibotan bakuto: Jingi tooshimasu (1972)
- Kizu darake jinsei furui do de gonzansu (1972)
- Onsen suppon geisha (1972) - Murata
- Kogarashi Monjirô (1972)
- Bakuchi-uchi Gaiden (1972)
- Battles Without Honor and Humanity (1973) - Ryoichi Enami
- Poruno no joô: Nippon sex ryokô (1973)
- Battles Without Honor and Humanity: Deadly Fight in Hiroshima (1973) - Iwashita Mitsuo
- Sukeban: Kankain dassô (1973) - Detective B
- Kyofu joshikôkô: Furyo monzetsu guruupu (1973) - Tokumaru
- Battles Without Honor and Humanity: Proxy War (1974) - Saijo Katsuji
- Gendai ninkyô-shi (1973) - Uno
- Bohachi Bushido: Code of the Forgotten Eight (1973)
- Yamaguchi-gumi San-daime (1973)
- Battles Without Honor and Humanity: Police Tactics (1974) - Policeman at hospital
- Gekitotsu! Satsujin ken (1974) - Ôshima
- Gakusei yakuza (1974)
- Karajishi keisatsu (1974)
- Battles Without Honor and Humanity: Final Episode (1974)
- Gokudo VS Mamushi (1974)
- Datsugoku Hiroshima satsujinshû (1974)
- Shijô saidai no himo: Nureta sakyu (1974)
- New Battles Without Honor and Humanity (1974)
- Jitsuroku hishyakaku ôkami domo no jingi (1974)
- Jînzu burûsu: Asu naki buraiha (1974) - Ishimatsu
- Nihon ninkyo-do: gekitotsu-hen (1975) - Matsu
- Mamushi to aodaishô (1975) - Kinichi Sunago
- Cops vs. Thugs (1975)
- Yusuri no technique: Niku jigoku (1975)
- Tamawarinin Yuki (1975) - Rokuzo
- Kigeki: Tokudashi - Himo tengoku (1975) - Hachiro Onishi
- Gambling Den Heist (1975) - Tetsuya bessho
- Kôshoku: Genroku (maruhi) monogatari (1975) - Hisamatsu (as The Piranha Gang)
- New Battles Without Honor and Humanity: The Boss's Head (1975)
- Gokudô shachô (1975)
- Bodo shimane keimusho (1975)
- Jitsuroku gaiden: Osaka dengeki sakusen (1976) - Chinese
- Bôsô panikku: Daigekitotsu (1976)
- New Battles Without Honor and Humanity: The Boss's Last Days (1976) - Kazunari Tsugawa
- Kurutta yajû (1976) - Saburo Tanimura
- Sengo Ryôki Hanzaishi (1976)
- Tokugawa onna keibatsu-emaki: Ushi-zaki no kei (1976)
- Yakuza Graveyard (1976) - Kajiyama
- Kawachi no ossan no uta (1976)
- Hiroshima jingi: Hitojichi dakkai sakusen (1976)
- Kawachi no ossan no uta: yôkita no ware (1976)
- Piraniya-gundan (1976)
- Yamaguchi-gumi gaiden: Kyushu shinko-sakusen (1977)
- Dokufu oden kubikiri asa (1977)
- Piranha-gundan: Daboshatsu no ten (1977) - Ten Matsuda
- The Life of Chikuzan (1977) - Senta
- Dokaben (1977)
- Nihon no jingi (1977) - Osamu Maekawa
- Doberuman deka (1977) - Hiyoshi Kinoshita
- Empire of Passion (1978) - Inspector Hotta
- Bandits vs. Samurai Squadron (1978) - Sanji
- Torakku yarô: Totsugeki ichiban hoshi (1978)
- Saraba eiga no tomoyo: Indian samaa (1979)
- Kidonappu burûsu (1982)
- The Burmese Harp (1985) - Sgt. Ito
- Kayako no tameni (1985) - Irujun Im
- Usugeshô (1985) - Ichiro Makabe
- Tora-san's Island Encounter (1985)
- Bakumatsu seishun graffiti: Ronin Sakamoto Ryoma (1986) - Kogoro Katsura
- Jittemai (1986) - Yasuke
- Hissatsu! III Ura ka Omote ka (1986)
- Hotaru-gawa (1987) - Sekine
- Hei no naka no korinai menmen (1987)
- Eien no 1/2 (1987)
- On'na sakasemasu (1987)
- Tsuru (1988) - Umaemon
- Zatoichi (1989)
- 226 (1989) - Sergeant Major Nagata
- Kagerô (1991) - Ryukichi Ineda
- Deer Friend (1991) - Taro Oriya
- Dreams of Russia (1992) - Koichi
- Keisho sakazuki (1992) - Kyozo Shigeta
- Haruka, nosutarujii (1993) - Tosaku Satoh
- Niji no hashi (1993)
- Pro Golfer Oribê Kinjirô 2 (1994) - Katsunari kawamata
- Don o totta otoko (1994)

=== Television ===
- Akakage (1967)
- Zenriyaku Ofukurosama (1975)
- G-Men '75 (1975–1976)
- Taiyō ni Hoero! (1978)
- Ōgon no Hibi (1978)
- Sanga Moyu (1984)
