= The War in Space =

- Original Japanese poster
- Directed by: Jun Fukuda
- Written by: Shuichi Nagahara; Ryuzo Nakanishi
- Produced by: Fumio Tanaka; Tomoyuki Tanaka
- Starring: Kensaku Morita; Yuko Asano; Masaya Oki; Ryō Ikebe; Hiroshi Miyauchi; William Ross
- Cinematography: Yuzuru Aizawa
- Edited by: Michiko Ikeda
- Music by: Toshiaki Tsushima
- Production company: Toho Eizo
- Distributed by: Toho
- Release date: December 17, 1977
- Running time: 91 minutes
- Country: Japan
- Language: Japanese

The War in Space, released in Japan as Great Planet War (惑星大戦争, Wakusei Daisensō), is a tokusatsu science fiction film produced and released by Toho Studios in 1977.

== Plot ==
In 1988, sightings of UFOs are reported all over America. UN scientist Professor Schmidt heads an investigation to look into the unusual reports. Space Station Terra crew reports to the Japanese branch of the UN Space Federation that a large "roman galleon" has appeared before all communication is lost.

UN team member Miyoshi visits world-renowned Professor Takigawa and says that the UN is ordering him to complete construction of the space defense unit he created, Gohten, so that they use it to repel the invaders. Takigawa, who disbanded the project three years before, refuses. Takigawa then gets a call from the Japanese branch, revealing that Schmidt was killed while investigating in the mountains.

While leaving, Miyoshi and fellow UN team member Muroi, along with Fuyuki, see Schmidt drive up to Takigawa's house. Takigawa lets him in and Schmidt says that his death was a rumor. He too tells Takigawa to complete the Gohten, but Takigawa recognizes that he is talking to an alien imposter with a latex mask. Miyoshi and his friends chase after the imposter, who blows himself up before they can get him.

After hearing of the incident, the UN puts Commander Oshi in charge of the defense forces. Takigawa is then ordered to complete Gohten's construction. Meanwhile, the aliens, who have set up a base on the planet Venus, launch an attack on Earth's cites, including New York City, London, Paris, Moscow, and San Francisco. The Gohten team take a submarine and reach the island where the spaceship is housed. Some of the UFOs attack the island. The Gohten is completed, however aliens infiltrate that base and try to take Takigawa away with them. Murrei, Jimmy and Miyoshi kill the aliens and save Takigawa. They get inside the Gohten and launch it to battle the UFOs.

The Gohten then heads into space towards Venus. En route, they come across Terra's wreckage. There, Muroi finds the body of one of Terra's crew, Mikasa, which is brought abroad the Gohten. However, it is soon discovered that the corpse is actually an alien in disguise. The alien kidnaps Muroi's fiancée June (Takigawa's daughter) and escapes with her on a UFO.

While chasing after the UFO, the crew of the Gohten receive a message from Venus. It is a warning from Commander Hell, the self-proclaimed Emperor of the Galaxy. Hell says that he and his race hail from the third planet of the Yomi system in the Messier 13 nebula, 22,000 light years from the Solar System. The aliens' planet has died, and they need to invade Earth to live on it.

The Gohten reaches Venus and Miyoshi, Muroi and Jimmy use a small lander to find the Daimakan, the alien spaceship. They find the Daimakan in a cave protected by a force field. They take pictures of it, but are nearly killed by the Daimakan's lasers.

It is eventually discovered that there is an air duct in the alien base that the humans can sneak into. Miyoshi, Fuyuki and several crewmen go out in the lander to get on board the Daimakan, while Muroi and other pilots try to destroy the force field with their space fighters while also fending off UFOs. Human Jimmy eventually sacrifices himself destroying the force field. Miyoshi and the others sneak inside the base and suffer heavy losses. Miyoshi rescues June, but not before battling and defeating the Space Beastman (most likely an animal from the alien homeworld). They return to the Gohten, but Muroi does not.

The Gohten and the Daimakan then fight. The Daimakan eventually wins when it fires an energy beam hidden under its frontal cannons. The Gohten becomes crippled by the beam and crashes on the Venusian surface.

While crew members repair the ship, Takigawa goes into its drill-bow. Miyoshi and June later find a tape recording made by Takigawa. He reveals that while building the Gohten, he discovered how to make a bomb so powerful, that it could blow up a planet. That was why he did not want to launch the Gohten and why the aliens wanted him. He detached the drill from the Gohten with him inside and launched it into the Daimakan, causing it to crash into an active volcano. That in turn causes a chain reaction all over Venus. The rest of the Gohten return to Earth just before Venus is destroyed.

== Cast ==
- Kensaku Morita as Koji Miyoshi, Duty Officer, United Nations Space Bureau
- Yuko Asano as June Takigawa, United Nations
- Masaya Oki as Reisuke Muroi, Flight Instructor, Japan Air Self Defense Forces
- Ryō Ikebe as Masato Takigawa, Doctor of Space Engineering, Commander of UNSF Goten
- Katsutoshi Arata as Tadashi Mikasa, Crewmember, Space Station Terra
- Hiroshi Miyauchi as Kazuo Fuyuki, Japan Air Self Defense Forces
- David Palen as Jimmy, Space Fighter Pilot, United Nations Space Forces
- Takashi Kanematsu as Tetsuo Kusaka, Japan Air Self Defense Forces
- Futoshi Kikuchi as Goro Minato, Japan Air Self Defense Forces
- Hideji Otaki as Dr. Matsuzawa, Director of United Nations Space Bureau, Japan Branch
- Akihiko Hirata as Commander Oishi, Japan Defence Forces
- William Ross as Dr. Schmitt/Commander Hell
- Toshikazu Moritagawa as Ishiyama, UNSF Goten Gunnery Group Leader
- Gorō Mutsumi as Heru, Commander-in-Chief of Planet Yomi Expeditionary Forces
- Isao Hashimoto as Scientist A, United Nations Space Forces, Japan Branch
- Go Endo as Scientist B, United Nations Space Forces, Japan Branch
- Shoji Nakayama as Staff Officer, Japan Self Defense Forces Headquarters
- Wataru Yamamoto as UNSF Goten Pilot
- Yu Naoki as UNSF Goten Co-pilot
- Yosuke Takemura as UNSF Goten Communications Officer A
- Shinichi Yoshimiya as UNSF Goten Communications Officer B
- Shinji Kawabata as UNSF Goten Bridge Officer A
- Koichi Yoshida as UNSF Goten Bridge Officer B
- Fumitsugu Hayata as UNSF Goten Bridge Officer C
- Junichi Eto as UNSF Goten Crew Member A
- Osamu Murashima as UNSF Goten Crew Member B
- Susumu Ootani as UNSF Goten Crew Member C
- Isao Setoyama as UNSF Goten Radar Officer
- Mammoth Suzuki as the Space Beast

== Production ==
=== Writing ===
While the concept and production of The War in Space was spurred by the international success of Star Wars, the film is actually an outer space redressing of Toho's undersea adventure Atragon and the groundbreaking anime series Space Battleship Yamato. The War in Space was originally announced as a sequel to Battle in Outer Space. Design-wise, the UNSF Gohten is a cross between the Space Battleship Yamato and Gotengo.

== DVD release ==
A DVD of the film was released in the United States on April 25, 2006 with both English and Japanese soundtracks. Included on the disc was an interview with special effects director for the film, Teruyoshi Nakano.
