= Gorō Mutsumi =

Japanese actor (1934–2021)

Gorō Mutsumi (睦五朗 or 睦五郎, Mutsumi Gorō; also credited as Goro Mutsu, September 11, 1934 – June 5, 2021 (claimed)) was a Japanese actor with more than 30 films to his credit. He has also appeared in numerous television shows, especially jidaigeki, in which he specializes in villains, and in tokusatsu. In addition, he is a stage and voice actor with prominent roles in narration, dubbing, and anime.

== Career ==
Mutsumi's film debut was in the 1955 film Saranohanano Tōge. Another early film appearance was in the 1963 Kōji Wakamatsu sex film Amai Wana, in which he co-starred with Tamaki Katori. The 1965 Ken Ki with jidaigeki superstar Raizo Ichikawa was a move to the mainstream. Mutsumi had a voice role in the 1966 War of the Gargantuas. Films that received attention outside Japan include Godzilla vs. Mechagodzilla (1974), Terror of Mechagodzilla (1975) and The War in Space (1977). He also appeared in the 1992 Toho film Minbo.

Mutsumi was a frequent guest star on television dramas and he often played villain roles. He has appeared in Key Hunter, Mighty Jack, Daichūshingura, Ōedo Sōsamō, Fireman, Lone Wolf and Cub, G-Men '75, Ultraman 80, Uchuu Keiji Sharivan, Shadow Warriors, Ōoka Echizen, Sanbiki ga Kiru!, and Moeyo Ken. Long-running series that he appeared in multiple times include Taiyō ni Hoero! (5), Tokusatsu Saizensen (5), Mito Kōmon (5), and Abarenbō Shōgun (4).

Mutsumi was cast in many voice parts. He narrated Mirrorman, Hissatsu Shikakenin, and Shōjo Commando IZUMI. He dubbed Dr. Richard Kimble, the David Janssen role, in The Fugitive. Mutsumi also voiced Janssen's O'Hara in O'Hara, U.S. Treasury, and Russ Tamblyn's Dr. Stewart in War of the Gargantuas. He portrayed Crystal Bowie in the 1982 anime Cobra.

== Personal life ==
Mutsumi was born on September 11, 1934, in Kobe. A blog post in June 2022 reported that he died on June 5, 2021, at the age of 86.

== Filmography ==
- Saranohanano Tōge (1955)
- Amai Wana (1963)
- Red Lion (1969)
- The Militarists (1970)
- Alleycat Rock: Female Boss (1970)
- Battle of Okinawa (1971)
- Daichūshingura (TV series, 1971)
- Fireman (TV series, 1973)
- Godzilla vs. Mechagodzilla (1974)
- Lone Wolf and Cub: White Heaven in Hell (1974)
- New Battles Without Honor and Humanity (1974)
- ESPY (1974)
- Terror of Mechagodzilla (1975)
- New Battles Without Honor and Humanity: The Boss's Head (1975)
- The War in Space (1977)
- Space Adventure Cobra: The Movie (1982)(Voice)
- Tokugawa Ieyasu (TV series, 1983)
- Hissatsu Masshigura! (TV series, 1986)
- Dokuganryū Masamune (TV series, 1987)
- Minbo (1992)
- Flower and Snake 3 (2010)
