= Hiroshi Minami (actor) =

Japanese actor (1928–1989)

- 南廣
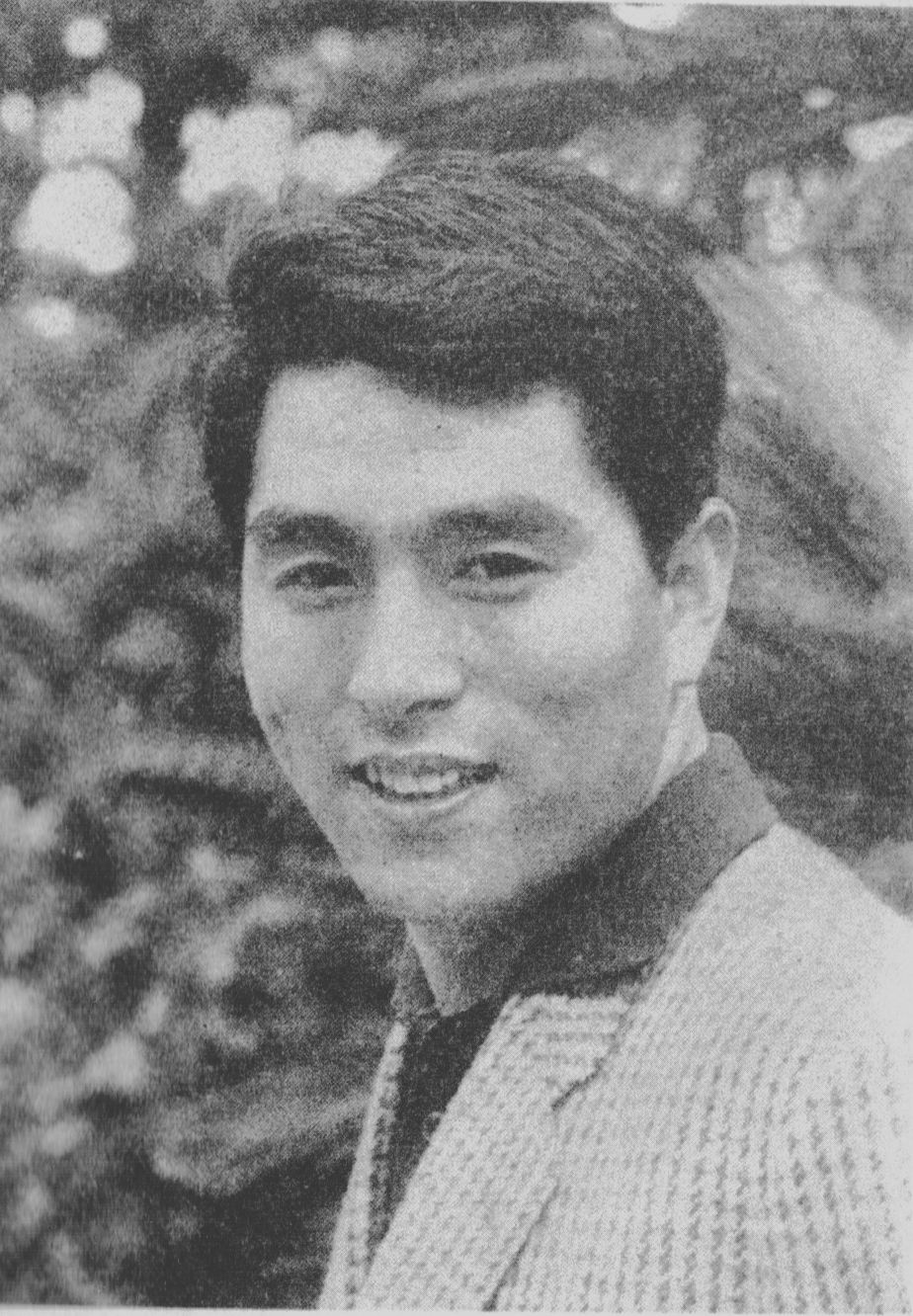
- Minami in 1962
- Born: Hiroshi Nakajima; March 15, 1928; Tokyo, Japan
- Died: March 4, 1989 (aged 60)
- Occupation: Actor
- Years active: 1947-1982

Hiroshi Minami (南廣; March 15, 1928 – March 4, 1989) was a Japanese actor.

== Selected filmography ==
- Ten to sen (1958) - Kiichi Mihara
- Keishichô monogatari: Iryûhin nashi (1959)
- Ôinaru tabiji (1960)
- Ikinuita jûroku-nen: Saigo no Nippon-hei (1960) - Minagawa, Army officer
- Keishichô monogatari: jûni-nin no keiji (1961) - Detective Azuma
- Kanpai! Gokigen yarou (1961)
- Hachi-nin me no teki (1961)
- Jigokû no sokô o buchi yabûre (1962)
- Sanroku (1962)
- Ankoku-gai saigo no hi (1962)
- Miyamoto Musashi: Hannyazaka no kettô (1962) - Fujitsugu Gion
- Minyô no tabi: Akita obako (1963)
- Jûdai no âshidôri (1963)
- Tokubetsu kidô sôsatai (1963) - Aramaki
- Tokubetsu kidô sôsatai: Tokyo eki ni harikome (1963) - Aramaki
- Ankokugai saidai no kettô (1963) - Inspector Ichikawa
- Miyamoto Musashi: Nitôryû kaigen (1963) - Toji - Gion Fujitsugu
- Muhomatsu no issho (1964)
- Zoku zûzûshii yatsu (1964) - Gotô
- Keishichô monogatari: Yukue fumei (1964) - Kitagawa
- Atout coeur à Tokyo pour O.S.S. 117 (1966)
- Chichibu suikoden: kage o kiru ken (1967) - Keijirô Ichinose
- Branded to Kill (1967) - Gihei Kasuga
- Kigeki: Dantai ressha (1967)
- Mighty Jack (1968) - (archive footage)
- Tarekomi (1969)
- Gyakuten ryoko (1969)
- Gendai yakuza: Shinjuku no yotamono (1970)
- Hakurai jingi: Kapone no shatei (1970)
- Yoru no saizensen: Tôkyô maruhi chitai (1971)
- Mekurano Oichi jigokuhada (1972)
- Bodigaado Kiba: Hissatsu sankaku tobi (1973) - Johnny Uchida
