= List of crime films of the 1960s =

This is a list of crime films released in the 1960s.

| Title | Director | Cast | Country | Notes |
|---|---|---|---|---|
1960
| Afraid to Die | Yasuzo Masumura | Eiji Funakoshi, Yukio Mishima, Takashi Shimura | Japan | |
| Les Bonnes Femmes | Claude Chabrol | Bernadette Lafont, Clotilde Joano, Lucille Saint-Simon | France; Italy | Crime drama |
| Breathless | Jean-Luc Godard | Jean-Paul Belmondo, Jean Seberg, Daniel Boulanger | France | Crime drama |
| Circus of Horrors | Sidney Hayers | Anton Diffring, Erika Remberg, Yvonne Monlaur | United Kingdom | |
| Classe Tous Risques | Claude Sautet | Lino Ventura, Jean-Paul Belmondo, Sandra Milo | Italy; France | |
| El Cochecito | Marco Ferreri | José Isbert, José Luis López Vázquez | Spain | Crime comedy |
| The Criminal | Joseph Losey | Stanley Baker, Sam Wanamaker, Grégoire Aslan | United Kingdom | |
| Gangster Story | Walter Matthau | Walter Matthau, Carol Grace, Bruce McFarlan | United States | |
| Inspector Palmu's Mistake/The Rygseck Mystery (US DVD title) | Matti Kassila | Joel Rinne, Matti Ranin, Leo Jokela | Finland | Crime comedy |
| The League of Gentlemen | Basil Dearden | Jack Hawkins, Nigel Patrick, Roger Livesey | United Kingdom | |
| Ma Barker's Killer Brood | Bill Karn | Roy Ward Baker, Owen Bush, David Carlile | United States | |
| Murder, Inc. | Burt Balaban, Stuart Rosenberg | Stuart Whitman, May Britt, Henry Morgan | United States | |
| Ocean's Eleven | Lewis Milestone | Frank Sinatra, Dean Martin, Sammy Davis Jr. | United States | |
| Pay or Die | Richard Wilson | Ernest Borgnine, Zohra Lampert, Alan Austin | United States | |
| Pretty Boy Floyd | Herbert J. Leder | John Ericson, Barry Newman, Joan Harvey | United States | |
| Purple Noon | René Clément | Alain Delon, Maurice Ronet, Marie Laforêt | France; Italy | Crime thriller |
| The Rise and Fall of Legs Diamond | Budd Boetticher | Ray Danton, Karen Steele, Elaine Stewart | United States | |
| Seven Thieves | Henry Hathaway | Edward G. Robinson, Rod Steiger, Joan Collins | United States | |
| Shoot the Piano Player | François Truffaut | Charles Aznavour, Nicole Berger, Marie Dubois | France | Crime drama |
| The Thousand Eyes of Dr. Mabuse | Fritz Lang | Gert Fröbe, Dawn Addams, Albert Bessler | West Germany; France; Italy | |
| Le Trou | Jacques Becker | Michel Constantin, Jean Keraudy, Philippe Leroy | France; Italy | Crime drama |
| The Virgin Spring | Ingmar Bergman | Max von Sydow, Birgitta Valberg, Gunnel Lindblom | Sweden | Crime drama |
1961
| Blast of Silence | Allen Baron | Allen Baron, Molly McCarthy, Larry Tucker | United States | |
| The Counterfeiters of Paris | Gilles Grangier | Jean Gabin, Martine Carol, Bernard Blier | France; Italy | |
| The Frightened City | John Lemont | Herbert Lom, John Gregson, Sean Connery | United Kingdom | |
| King of the Roaring 20's: The Story of Arnold Rothstein | Joseph Newman | David Janssen, Dianne Foster, Jack Carson | United States | |
| Mad Dog Coll | Burt Balaban | John Chandler, Neil Nephew, Brooke Hayward | United States | |
| Pigs and Battleships | Shōhei Imamura | Hiroyuki Nagato, Jitsuko Yoshimura, Tetsurō Tamba | Japan | |
| Portrait of a Mobster | Joseph Pevney | Vic Morrow, Leslie Parrish, Peter Breck | United States | |
| The Sinister Urge | Edward D. Wood Jr. | Carl Anthony | United States | |
| Underworld U.S.A. | Samuel Fuller | Cliff Robertson, Dolores Dorn, Beatrice Kay | United States | |
| Victim | Basil Dearden | Dirk Bogarde, Sylvia Syms, Dennis Price | United Kingdom | Crime drama |
1962
| Arsene Lupin Contre Arsene Lupin | Édouard Molinaro | Jean-Claude Brialy, Jean-Pierre Cassel, Françoise Dorléac | France; Italy | |
| La commare secca | Bernardo Bertolucci | Gabriella Giorgetti, Giancarlo de Rosa, Vincenzo Ciccora | Italy | Crime drama |
| The Eye of Evil | Claude Chabrol | Jacques Charrier, Stéphane Audran, Walter Reyer | France; Italy | Crime drama |
| I Thank a Fool | Robert Stevens | Susan Hayward, Peter Finch, Diane Cilento | United Kingdom | |
| Mafioso | Alberto Lattuada | Alberto Sordi, Ugo Attanasio | Italy | Crime comedy |
| Rocambole | Bernard Borderie | Channing Pollock, Edy Vessel, Alberto Lupo | France; Italy | |
| Salvatore Giuliano | Francesco Rosi | Salvo Randone, Frank Wolff, Federico Zardi | Italy | |
| To Kill a Mockingbird | Robert Mulligan | Gregory Peck, Mary Badham, Phillip Alford | United States | Courtroom drama |
1963
| Any Number Can Win | Henri Verneuil | Jean Gabin, Alain Delon, Viviane Romance | France; Italy | |
| Banana Peel | Marcel Ophüls | Jeanne Moreau, Jean-Paul Belmondo, Claude Brasseur | France; Italy | Crime comedy |
| Cairo | Wolf Rilla | George Sanders, Richard Johnson, Faten Hamama | United Kingdom; United States | |
| Detective Bureau 23: Go to Hell, Bastards! | Seijun Suzuki | Jo Shishido, Reiko Sasamori, Tamio Kawachi | Japan | |
| Le Doulos | Jean-Pierre Melville | Jean-Paul Belmondo, Serge Reggiani, Monique Hennessy | France; Italy | |
| Girl's Apartment | Michel Deville | Mylène Demongeot, Sylva Koscina, Renate Ewert | France; Italy; West Germany | Crime comedy |
| High and Low | Akira Kurosawa | Toshiro Mifune, Tatsuya Nakadai, Kyōko Kagawa | Japan | Crime drama |
| The Informers | Ken Annakin | Nigel Patrick, Frank Finlay, Derren Nesbitt | United Kingdom | |
| Johnny Cool | William Asher | Henry Silva, Elizabeth Montgomery, Richard Anderson | United States | |
| Judex | Georges Franju | Channing Pollock, Francine Bergé, Édith Scob | France; Italy | |
| Kanto Wanderer | Seijun Suzuki | | Japan | |
| Landru | Claude Chabrol | Charles Denner, Danielle Darrieux, Michèle Morgan | France; Italy | |
| Pale Flower | Masahiro Shinoda | Ryō Ikebe, Mariko Kaga | Japan | |
| Du Rififi à Tokyo | Jacques Deray | Karlheinz Böhm, Keiko Kishi, Barbara Lass | France; Italy; United States | |
| Symphonie pour un massacre | Jacques Deray | Michel Auclair, Claude Dauphin, Charles Vanel | United States | |
| Les Tontons flingueurs | Georges Lautner | Lino Ventura, Bernard Blier, Francis Blanche | France; Italy; West Germany | Crime comedy |
| Youth of the Beast | Seijun Suzuki | Jo Shishido | Japan | |
1964
| Band of Outsiders | Jean-Luc Godard | Anna Karina, Claude Brasseur, Sami Frey | France | Crime drama |
| Fantômas | André Hunebelle | Jean Marais, Louis de Funès, Mylène Demongeot | France; Italy | |
| Le Gendarme de Saint-Tropez | Jean Girault | Louis de Funès, Michel Galabru, Geneviève Grad | France; Italy | |
| The Killers | Don Siegel | Lee Marvin, Angie Dickinson, John Cassavetes | United States | |
| The Naked Kiss | Samuel Fuller | Constance Towers, Anthony Eisley, Michael Dante | United States | Crime drama |
| Les plus belles escroqueries du monde | Claude Chabrol, Jean-Luc Godard, Ugo Gregoretti, Hiromichi Horikawa, Roman Polanski | Jean-Pierre Cassel, Francis Blanche, Catherine Deneuve | France; Italy; Japan; Netherlands | |
| Robin and the Seven Hoods | Gordon Douglas | Frank Sinatra, Dean Martin, Sammy Davis Jr., Bing Crosby | United States | |
| Séance on a Wet Afternoon | Bryan Forbes | Kim Stanley, Richard Attenborough, Margaret Lacey | United Kingdom | Crime drama |
| Topkapi | Jules Dassin | Melina Mercouri, Peter Ustinov, Maximilian Schell | United States | |
1965
| Le Corniaud | Gérard Oury | Louis de Funès, Bourvil, Beba Lončar | France; Italy | |
| The Face of Fu Manchu | Don Sharp | Christopher Lee, Nigel Green, Howard Marion-Crawford | United Kingdom | Master criminal films |
| Fantômas se déchaîne | André Hunebelle | Jean Marais, Louis de Funès, Mylène Demongeot | France; Italy | |
| Operation Y and Other Shurik's Adventures | Leonid Gaidai | Alexander Demyanenko, Alexei Smirnov, Mikhail Pugovkin | Soviet Union | Crime comedy |
| Sette uomini d'oro | Marco Vicario | Rossana Podestà, Philippe Leroy, Giampiero Albertini | Italy | |
| Tattooed Life | Seijun Suzuki | Hiroko Ito, Masako Izumi, Hideki Takahashi | Japan | Crime drama |
| Young Dillinger | Terrell O. Morse | Nick Adams, Robert Conrad, John Ashley | United States | |
1966
| Assault on a Queen | Jack Donohue | Frank Sinatra, Virna Lisi, Anthony Franciosa | United States | |
| Le deuxième souffle | Jean-Pierre Melville | Lino Ventura, Paul Meurisse, Raymond Pellegrin | France | |
| Gambit | Ronald Neame | Shirley MacLaine, Michael Caine, Herbert Lom | United States | |
| How to Steal a Million | William Wyler | Audrey Hepburn, Peter O'Toole, Eli Wallach | United States | |
| Kaleidoscope | Jack Smight | Warren Beatty, Susannah York, Clive Revill | United Kingdom | Criminal comedy |
| Made in U.S.A. | Jean-Luc Godard | Anna Karina, Jean-Pierre Léaud, László Szabó | France | |
| Tokyo Drifter | Seijun Suzuki | Tetsuya Watari, Tamio Kawachi, Hideaki Nitani | Japan | |
1967
| Bonnie and Clyde | Arthur Penn | Warren Beatty, Faye Dunaway, Michael J. Pollard | United States | |
| Branded to Kill | Seijun Suzuki | Jo Shishido, Mariko Ogawa, Koji Nanbara | Japan | |
| The Busy Body | William Castle | Sid Caesar, Robert Ryan, Anne Baxter | United States | Crime comedy |
| Fantômas contre Scotland Yard | André Hunebelle | Jean Marais, Louis de Funès, Mylène Demongeot | France; Italy | |
| Grand Slam | Giuliano Montaldo | Edward G. Robinson, Janet Leigh, Robert Hoffmann | Italy; West Germany; Spain | |
| Gunn | Blake Edwards | Craig Stevens, Laura Devon, Ed Asner | United States | |
| Hells Angels on Wheels | Richard Rush | Jack Nicholson, Adam Roarke, Sabrina Scharf | United States | Crime action |
| In Cold Blood | Richard Brooks | Robert Blake, Scott Wilson, John Forsythe | United States | |
| In the Heat of the Night | Norman Jewison | Sidney Poitier, Rod Steiger, Warren Oates | United States | Crime drama |
| The Jokers | Michael Winner | Michael Crawford, Oliver Reed, Harry Andrews | United Kingdom | |
| Massacre Gun | Yasuharu Hasebe | Tatsuya Fuji, Jirô Okazaki, Jo Shishido | Japan | |
| Point Blank | John Boorman | Lee Marvin, Angie Dickinson, Keenan Wynn | United States | |
| Robbery | Peter Yates | Stanley Baker, Joanna Pettet | United Kingdom | |
| Le Samouraï | Jean-Pierre Melville | Alain Delon, Nathalie Delon, Cathy Rosier | France; Italy | |
| The St. Valentine's Day Massacre | Roger Corman | Jason Robards Jr., George Segal, Ralph Meeker | United States | |
| The Thief of Paris | Louis Malle | Jean-Paul Belmondo, Geneviève Bujold, Marie Dubois | France; Italy | |
| Velvet Hustler | Toshio Masuda | Tetsuya Watari, Ruriko Asaoka, Kayo Matsuo | Japan | |
1968
| The Biggest Bundle of Them All | Ken Annakin | Andrea Aurelia, Paola Borboni, Calisto Calisti | United States; Italy | |
| The Boston Strangler | Richard Fleischer | Tony Curtis, Henry Fonda, George Kennedy | United States | |
| The Brotherhood | Martin Ritt | Kirk Douglas, Alex Cord, Irene Papas | United States | |
| The Cats | Duccio Tessari | Giuliano Gemma, Klaus Kinski, Margaret Lee | Italy; France; West Germany | |
| Comandamenti per un gangster | Alfio Caltabiano | Ljuba Tadić, Alfio Caltabiano, Dante Maggio | Italy; Yugoslavia | |
| Coogan's Bluff | Don Siegel | Clint Eastwood, Lee J. Cobb, Susan Clark | United States | |
| Danger: Diabolik | Mario Bava | John Phillip Law, Marisa Mell, Michel Piccoli | Italy; France | Caper |
| The Detective | Gordon Douglas | Frank Sinatra, Lee Remick, Ralph Meeker | United States | |
| The Diamond Arm | Leonid Gaidai | Yuri Nikulin, Nina Grebeshkova, Andrei Mironov | Soviet Union | |
| Faut Pas Prendre Les Enfantes Du Bon Dieu Pour Des Canards Sauvages | Michel Audiard | Françoise Rosay, Bernard Blier, Marlène Jobert | France | |
| Killers Three | Bruce Kessler | Robert Walker Jr., Diane Varsi, Dick Clark | United States | |
| Never a Dull Moment | Jerry Paris | Dick Van Dyke | United States | |
| No Way to Treat a Lady | Jack Smight | Rod Steiger, Lee Remick, George Segal | United States | |
| Outlaw: Gangster VIP | Toshio Masuda | Tetsuya Watari, Chieko Matsubara, Tatsuya Fuji | Japan | Gangster film |
| Pretty Poison | Noel Black | Anthony Perkins, Tuesday Weld, Beverly Garland | United States | Crime thriller |
| Roma come Chicago | Alberto De Martino | John Cassavetes, Gabriele Ferzetti, Anita Sanders | Italy | |
| Skidoo | Otto Preminger | Jackie Gleason, Carol Channing, Frankie Avalon | United States | |
| The Split | Gordon Flemyng | Jim Brown, Diahann Carroll, Julie Harris | United States | |
| Targets | Peter Bogdanovich | Boris Karloff, Tim O'Kelly | United States | Crime thriller |
| The Thomas Crown Affair | Norman Jewison | Steve McQueen, Faye Dunaway, Paul Burke | United States | |
| The Unfaithful Wife | Claude Chabrol | Stéphane Audran, Michel Bouquet, Maurice Ronet | France; Italy | Crime drama |
1969
| Bloody Territories | Yasuharu Hasebe | Tsuneo Aoki, Tatsuya Fuji, Rika Fujie | Japan | |
| The Brain | Gérard Oury | Bourvil, Jean-Paul Belmondo, David Niven | France; Italy; United States | Crime comedy |
| The Castle of Fu Manchu | Jesús Franco | Christopher Lee, Werner Abrolat | West Germany; Spain; United Kingdom | Master criminal film |
| Le Clan des Siciliens | Henri Verneuil | Alain Delon, Jean Gabin, Lino Ventura | France; Italy | |
| The Devil's 8 | Burt Topper | Christopher George, Fabian, Tom Nardini | United States | |
| The Italian Job | Peter Collinson | Michael Caine, Noël Coward, Benny Hill | United Kingdom | |
| Love Is Colder Than Death | Rainer Werner Fassbinder | Ulli Lommel, Hanna Schygulla, Katrin Schaake | West Germany | |
| Machine Gun McCain | Giuliano Montaldo | John Cassavetes, Britt Ekland, Peter Falk | Italy; Yugoslavia | |
| La Piscine | Jacques Deray | Alain Delon, Romy Schneider, Maurice Ronet | France; Italy | Crime drama |

== Notes ==
=== References ===
- Curti, Roberto (2013). Italian Crime Filmography, 1968-1980. McFarland. ISBN 978-0786469765.
