= Noriko Matsumoto (disambiguation) =

Noriko Matsumoto (born 1968) is a Japanese singer and television personality.

Noriko Matsumoto may refer to:

- Noriko Matsumoto (1935–2014), Japanese actress and stage director.
- Noriko Matsumoto (born 1991), Japanese professional wrestler known better as Rydeen Hagane
