= Lovemaker =

Lovemaker or variants may refer to:

- Lovemaker (it), 1969 film with Antonio Sabàto Sr.
- The Lovemakers (film), 1961 Italian film
- The Lovemakers (band), US
- "Pyar Karne Wale" (lit. 'Lovemakers'), a song by R. D. Burman and Asha Bhosle from the 1980 Indian film Shaan
