= The Lovemakers =

The Lovemakers may refer to:

- The Lovemakers (film)
- The Lovemakers (band)
