= The Warped Ones =

- Original theatrical poster
- Directed by: Koreyoshi Kurahara
- Written by: Nobuo Yamada
- Produced by: Takeshi Yamamoto
- Starring: Tamio Kawachi; Eiji Go; Yuko Chishiro; Noriko Matsumoto
- Cinematography: Yoshio Mamiya
- Edited by: Akira Suzuki
- Music by: Toshiro Mayuzumi
- Distributed by: Nikkatsu
- Release date: September 3, 1960 (Japan)
- Running time: 76 minutes
- Country: Japan
- Language: Japanese

The Warped Ones (Japanese: 狂熱の季節, Hepburn: Kyōnetsu no kisetsu) is a 1960 Japanese Sun Tribe film directed by Koreyoshi Kurahara and starring Tamio Kawachi, Eiji Go, Yuko Chishiro and Noriko Matsumoto. It was produced and distributed by the Nikkatsu Company. The story concerns the young hoodlum Akira, his friends, their transgressions and specifically their revenge on the couple that got him sent to jail, a reporter and his fiancée. When the fiancée finds herself pregnant by Akira she enlists his help with her fiancé who has become distant since the attack.

Often compared by critics to Breathless (1960) and Rebel Without a Cause (1955), it is a stylistic departure from studio norms, driven by its jazz score and employing filmic techniques described as being as energetic and frantic as its characters. It achieved success in Japan and was followed by Black Sun (1964), featuring many of the same cast, crew and characters, with the addition of acclaimed drummer Max Roach to the soundtrack. Audubon Films released The Warped Ones in the United States in 1963, where it was marketed as a sexploitation film.

== Plot ==
Criminal and jazz aficionado Akira (Tamio Kawachi) and his prostitute girlfriend Yuki (Yuko Chishiro) are arrested when they are spotted fleecing foreigners in a jazz club by a reporter named Kashiwagi (Hiroyuki Nagato). In jail, Akira meets Masaru (Eiji Go) and on their release they and Yuki resume criminal activities. They spot Kashiwagi and his artist fiancée, Fumiko (Noriko Matsumoto), hit him with a stolen car and kidnap her. They take her to a remote beach where Akira rapes her while Masaru and Yuki fornicate in the ocean.

Soon after, the three rent an apartment with money earned from fencing the stolen car. Masaru and Yuki commit to starting a family, while he joins a yakuza gang, to the derision of Akira. Fumiko tracks Akira down and informs him that she is pregnant. Kashiwagi has become distant and haughty and she pleads with Akira for help. Akira arranges for Yuki to seduce Kashiwagi so that the couple might again be on equal terms. Masaru is killed by a rival yakuza. Yuki discovers that she too is pregnant but without Masaru's support she resolves to get an abortion and resume her prostitution career. Akira and Yuki meet Kashiwagi and Fumiko by chance at an abortion clinic where Akira reveals that each woman was impregnated by the other man, to the amusement of the former couple and befuddlement of the latter.

== Production ==
The Nikkatsu Company made three popular Sun Tribe films in 1956, a genre based on a contemporary youth subculture whose interests revolved around beach life, jazz music and their progressive attitudes towards sex. The films met with moral public outcries and a fourth production was shut down at the behest of Eirin (The Motion Picture Code of Ethics Committee). However, the genre later experienced a resurgence which included The Warped Ones. The film marked director Koreyoshi Kurahara's first collaboration with screenwriter Nobuo Yamada. They reused many elements of Kurahara's earlier Sun Tribe film The Time of Youth (1959), including abortion, a near fatality via an opened gas cock and a criminal act near water, an explosion beside a stream in the former and the rape on the beach in the latter.

Nikkatsu was promoting lead actor Tamio Kawachi as one of its Bad Boy Trio, along with Akira Kobayashi and Tadao Sawamoto. Kurahara asked him to think of his character as a "hungry lion roaring at the sun." He turned in what writer Mark Schilling described as his most unusual, and one of his best, performances of the period. Supporting actress Noriko Matsumoto came to the film as a relative unknown. Hiroyuki Nagato had starred in The Time of Youth. Eiji Go was the younger brother of future Diamond Line star Joe Shishido. The film was completed on August 18, 1960.

== Style ==
As writer Mark Schilling put it, "the soundtrack drives the action," and composer Toshirō Mayuzumi's jazz score moves swiftly. Cinematographer Yoshi Mamiya and editor Akira Suzuki employed swish-pans, freeze frames and jump cuts, alternating between carefully composed shots and seemingly recklessly hand-held camera work. The titular youths of the film too move violently and speak in grunts, screams, whistles and sound effects, Akira frequently greeting women with, "Wanna get laid?" or Masura's scat, "At-tatatatatataaaaa!" They are portrayed as amoral, impulsive narcissists and hedonists, pickpocketing and stealing cars with equal nonchalance. Akira, described as possessing the "face-rubbing mannerisms of [Marlon] Brando and the tortured swagger of James Dean," varies between the sadistic and the indifferent—save when in a jazz-induced fervor—and reaches extremes largely unseen in the contemporaneous cinema of the West. The film's subject matter is sensationalistic and it contains much incident in its short run time. The overall style is matched to the characters' verve and the story's frantic pace.

While not portraying Akira sympathetically, the film does offer a socio-political view on the origins and inevitability of such criminal types in society. The tenements in which the youths reside are depicted as inhospitable and sterile. Lacking education, proper role models and moral codes, critic Bryan Hartzheim posited, crime and base pleasures are their most open recourse. They seem aware of the injustices in their environments and rail against society at large. However, Akira is illustrated as being capable of innocent pleasure, particularly in one fleeting scene in which he and his black friend Gil (Chico Rolands), whom he views as a fellow outcast, frolic in the ocean.

== Reception ==
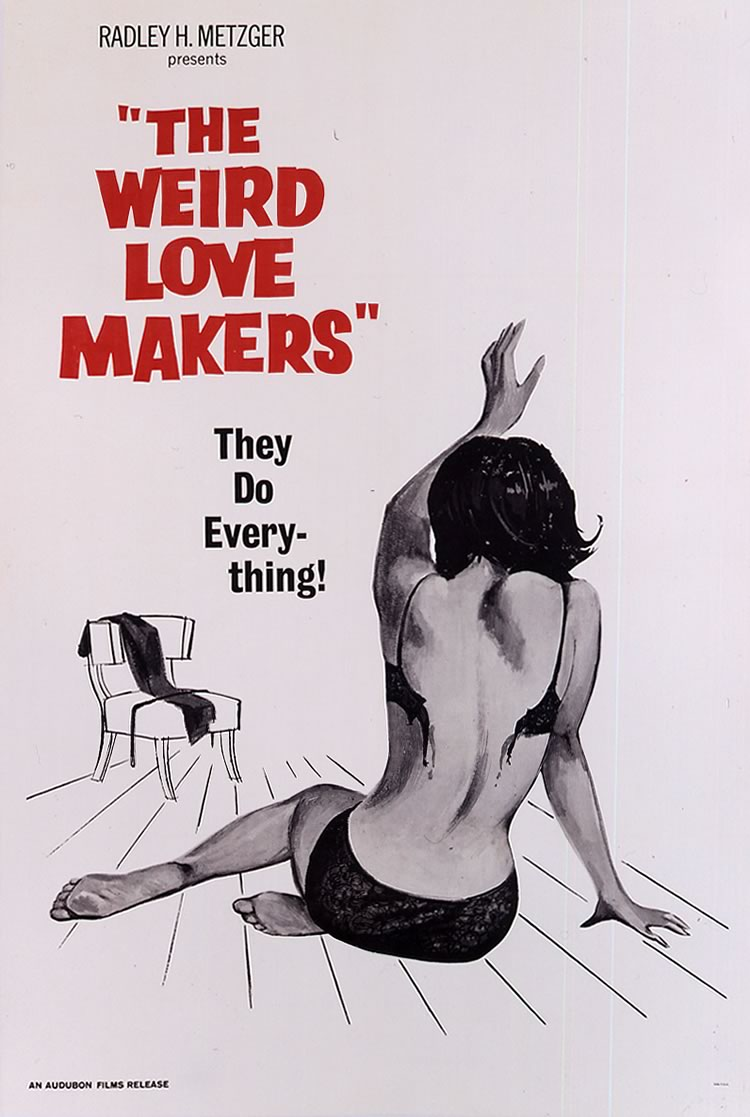
The Audubon Films theatrical poster employed simple artwork and a suggestive tagline to promote the film as being exploitative, contrary to the film's actual content.

The Warped Ones was originally released in Japan by the Nikkatsu Company on September 3, 1960. The film was successful in Japan, although not so much so that Tamio Kawachi was ever elevated to major star status and after his "Bad Boy" period he was mainly relegated to second lead and supporting parts. In July 1961, Arthur Davis' newly formed, American, foreign film distribution company Kanji Pictures announced it had acquired ten Nikkatsu films for North and South American markets and parts of Europe. The films included The Warped Ones, Shohei Imamura's Pigs and Battleships (1961) and Kon Ichikawa's The Burmese Harp (1956) and were to be distributed by Kanji or sold to other distribution companies. An English-dubbed version of The Warped Ones was then released in the United States on December 18, 1963, by Radley Metzger's sexploitation-centric Audubon Films, initially as The Weird Lovemakers, then The Warped Ones became the more common title. It was marketed as an American film, and misleadingly implied to contain sexually explicit material, in order to appeal to a wider audience.

The original film resurfaced some four decades later at the 2005 Udine Far East Film Festival in the No Borders, No Limits: Nikkatsu Action Cinema retrospective. Mark Schilling curated the retrospective in order to expose international audiences to 1960s Nikkatsu Action films which, aside from the films of Seijun Suzuki, remained predominately unseen outside Japan. Schilling originally titled the film Season of Heat—a literal translation of the Japanese title—but it was retitled The Warped Ones for subsequent incarnations of the retrospective, which included runs in Austin and New York. It also appeared in a 12-film retrospective of Koreyoshi Kurahara's Nikkatsu films at the 2008 Tokyo Filmex International Film Festival in Japan. It was screened with English subtitles.

Critics have most often compared the film to landmark youth films Breathless (also 1960)—released in France five months earlier—directed by Jean-Luc Godard and Nicholas Ray's Rebel Without a Cause (1955), although, Bryan Hartzheim found it takes its youths more seriously and with less sympathy. He stated, "[The Warped Ones takes] a wrecking ball to what can be considered the indulgencies of the [youth film] genre, an exhibition of the horrors of uninhibited youth taken to its carnal extremes and matched by a visual accompaniment akin to the abstract and improvised style of a Miles Davis score." Tim Lucas of Video Watchdog magazine called the film "an important rediscovery on many fronts... one of the great jazz films, and possibly the best illustration the cinema has ever given us of the jazz buff. It's the only film I've ever seen that makes jazz seem scarier than the darkest heavy metal, that makes jazz seem dangerous." For TokyoScope: The Japanese Cult Film Companion, Alvin Lu commended the score as "stunning" and Kawachi's performance as "ferocious, the very incarnation of the kind of social chaos that could be engendered by too much exposure to jazz, Coke, and hot dogs." The Boston Globe's Wesley Morris wrote, "[Koreyoshi] Kurahara takes the movie to extremes of behavior and style, merging the two until the form seems as violently unstable as the characters. He makes a wave that in Europe was called 'French' and 'new.' But with all due respect to Jean-Luc Godard, this is breathless - and more interesting, too." Morris further qualified that while Breathless may appeal to contemporary viewers academically, The Warped Ones retains a spontaneous, documentary feel. Schilling discerned the film, "Among [Kurahara's] boldest departures from studio convention."

Reviewer Peter Martin confided, "The Warped Ones baffled and mystified me, but I liked it very much." J.R. Jones, for The Reader's Guide to Arts & Entertainment, found the film "actually celebrates the values it's supposed to be condemning," but recommended it for its kineticism and action. TV Guide and Allmovie did not recommended it; both gave it one star in their respective four and five star rating systems.

== Legacy ==
The success of the film lead Koreyoshi Kurahara and Nobuo Yamada to write and direct a couple more original scripts, where Kurahara was primarily known for his adaptations of novels. This included the follow-up Black Sun (1964) which again featured Tamio Kawachi, who reprised his role from The Warped Ones, as did several of the other actors, and a lot of jazz music. In it, Kawachi's Akira shelters a black G.I., Gil, played by Chico Rolands, who goes A.W.O.L. after killing a white man in a bar fight. The film explores the two men's friendship and race relations. It was also the first reversal on rashamen-themed films, post-war, often American-Japanese co-productions focusing on friendships or romances between a Japanese and an American. Rashamen films were intended as to promote goodwill between the two nations but were generally less well received in Japan, seen as unrealistic or patronizing. Film historian Tadao Sato described Black Sun as the first film of this sort where Japanese pity Americans instead of the reverse as Akira's preconceptions of black Americans are undone. Mark Schilling characterized Kawachi as bringing an "explosive energy" to the film and Roland a "piping screech of fear and desperation." Acclaimed American jazz musician Max Roach contributed to the score.

Alvin Lu found The Warped Ones to be a prime example of the Sun Tribe genre and placed it among those films whose outlook made way for the Japanese pink film. In the film Tim Lucas noted antecedents and a possible influence to "the most hellbent characters" in the films of acclaimed director Quentin Tarantino's films and specifically to Stanley Kubrick's iconic A Clockwork Orange (1971). Lucas drew comparisons between The Warped Ones' main character Akira and A Clockwork Orange's Alex DeLarge, including their respective obsessions with hard jazz and the music of Ludwig van Beethoven, the former with a framed copy of Ornette Coleman's album The Shape of Jazz to Come next to his bed, the latter an engraving of Beethoven. Also, scenes of the former's verbal deconstructions by a group of art students versus the latter's by the government. Akira's attacks on abstract art and DeLarge's on pop art–lined homes. Finally, the character's regular hangouts, both painted with black walls, the former's adorned with portraits of jazz legends, the latter's with advertisements for "Vellocet" and "Drencrom"—the fictional drugs DeLarge and his gang use to invigorate themselves before their criminal acts. Lucas concluded, "Kubrick simply had to have seen it."

Two American music groups took their name from The Warped Ones' alternate sexploitation title, The Weird Lovemakers. The now defunct Tucson punk band The Weird Lovemakers assumed the name in 1994 and held it until their disbandment in 2000. The Oakland, California–based electropop band The Lovemakers planned to use the same name on their inception in 2002 but dropped the "Weird" upon their discovery of the former band having taken the name.

== Home video ==
In North America, an abridged, dubbed, VHS version of the film is available from Something Weird Video under the moniker The Weird Lovemakers. In 2007, a DVD-R version was also made available. A DVD for The Warped Ones was released by the Criterion Collection, under their Eclipse brand, on August 23, 2011 as part of their "The Warped World of Koreyoshi Kurahara" compilation.

== Soundtrack ==
The Warped Ones / Black Sun

Soundtrack album by Toshirō Mayuzumi
- Released: February 23, 2007
- Genres: Soundtrack, Jazz
- Label: Think

On February 23, 2007, the Japanese label Think! Records reissued the soundtrack on Compact Disc as a part of its Cine Jazz series, which featured 1960s Nikkatsu Action film scores. It is part of a two disc set, the first contains music from Toshirō Mayuzumi's score for Black Sun (1964) and the second from his score for The Warped Ones. The first disc features American jazz musicians Max Roach on drums, Clifford Jordan on tenor saxophone, Ronnie Mathews on piano, Eddie Kahn on bass and vocals by Abbey Lincoln. The second disc features the Nikkatsu Jazz Group

=== Track listing ===
	Black Sun			The Warped Ones
#	Title	Length	#	Title	Length	#	Title	Length
1.	"Scene A"	5:04	1.	"Scene 1"	2:02	11.	"Scene 11"	1:42
2.	"Scene A2"	4:52	2.	"Scene 2"	2:05	12.	"Scene 12"	0:47
3.	"Scene B"	5:27	3.	"Scene 3"	1:32	13.	"Scene 13"	1:30
4.	"Scene C"	7:02	4.	"Scene 4"	2:21	14.	"Scene 14"	4:25
5.	"Scene D"	2:30	5.	"Scene 5"	0:44	15.	"Scene 15–1"	0:21
6.	"Scene E2"	10:36	6.	"Scene 6"	0:56	16.	"Scene 15–2"	0:36
7.	"Scene E3"	8:28	7.	"Scene 7"	3:54	17.	"Scene 16"	0:40
8.	"Scene F2"	4:55	8.	"Scene 8"	1:33
9.	"Scene G"	2:53	9.	"Scene 9"	0:50
10.	"Scene H"	2:15	10.	"Scene 10"	0:21
