= Tensei Kono =

Japanese writer

Tensei Kono (河野 典生, Kōno Tensei; January 27, 1935 – January 29, 2012) was a prominent Japanese mystery and science fiction writer who won the Mystery Writers of Japan Award and was a two-time finalist for the Naoki Prize. His short fiction including his often-reprinted story "Triceratops" has been translated into English in anthologies such as Speculative Japan: Outstanding Tales of Japanese Science Fiction and Fantasy, The Best Japanese Science Fiction Stories and The World Treasury of Science Fiction. In total, he published more than 30 novels and short story collections.

== Life ==
Kono was born in Kōchi, Kōchi Prefecture and studied French literature at Keio University. While at the university he began writing poems, plays, and fantasy novels, publishing his play The Fallen Hawk in the school's literary magazine.

He died at the age of 77 on January 29, 2012 due to aspiration pneumonia.

== Writing career ==
In 1958, Kono dropped out of Keio University and began working in television. The following year he submitted Going My Way to a call for original novels for the Nippon Television program Night Prism, where his work received an honorable mention. He also began publishing hard-boiled mystery stories in publications such as the Japanese edition of Alfred Hitchcock's Mystery Magazine. In 1960 he published the collection of short stories Young Men Die in the Sun and the following year the collection On the Asphalt. In 1964 he won the Mystery Writers of Japan Award for Satsui to iu Na no Kachiku (殺意という名の家畜 A Livestock Named Murderous). As a result of his success in mystery writing he was named one of the "three hard-boiled crows" alongside fellow authors Takashi Takajo and Haruhiko Ōyabu, all of whom were born in 1935.

Kono's 1969 mystery novel Others' Castle was a finalist for the prestigious Naoki Prize, as was his 1974 book Group of Painting Knives.

In addition to writing mysteries, Kono also began writing science fiction and fantasy stories after meeting Masami Fukushima, the editor of SF Magazine. He became a prominent science fiction writer known for stories that mixed mysterious imagery from both nature and civilization. Among such works are his two collections of "city naturalist" short stories set in a surrealistic suburban landscape.

Kono's 1974 city naturalist story "Triceratops" ("トリケラトプス") is his work most frequently translated into English. The story was first published in English in the August 1982 issue of OMNI. The story is about a "normal, middle-class Japanese father and son who live in a subdivision normal in every way but one: the fabric of time is torn just enough to allow them to see dinosaurs in the streets." The story has since been reprinted in The Best Japanese Science Fiction Stories, The Fifth Omni Book of Science Fiction, and The World Treasury of Science Fiction.

His story "Hikari," originally published in 1976 in Shukan Shosetsu, was translated and printed in the 2007 anthology Speculative Japan: Outstanding Tales of Japanese Science Fiction and Fantasy. The story focuses on a narrator riding a train at night who seeing a distant city of shining light and then learns about the people who live there. In a review in Strange Horizons, "Hikari" was described by Niall Harrison as "an odd but haunting story, deeply sceptical of transcendence."

Kono's city naturalist series has been described as "delicately evocative" and "among the best of any Japanese SF writer," with the stories in the series compared to the works of Ray Bradbury. Kono's writings have also been compared to both Jorge Luis Borges and the early works of J. G. Ballard.

== Awards ==
- 1959 Honorable Mention, Nippon Television's "Prism of the Night" Original Story Award for "Going My Way"
- 1964 Mystery Writers of Japan Award for Satsui to iu Na no Kachiku (殺意という名の家畜, A Livestock Named Murderous)
- 1969 Finalist for the Naoki Prize for Others' Castle
- 1974 Finalist for the Naoki Prize for Group of Painting Knives
- 1975 Kadokawa Award for the novel Tomorrow the Birds Take Wing

== Works ==
- Young People Die in the Sunlight (陽光の下、若者は死ぬ, Arachi Publishing, 1960) - This collection contains different short stories from the Kadokawa Bunko version published in 1973.
- On the Asphalt (アスファルトの上, Kofusha, 1961)
- Under the Black Sun (黒い陽の下で, Naniwa Shobo, 1961) – Story for the film Black Sun (1964)
- Murder Crowd (殺人群集, Kofusha 1961, later published by Tokuma Bunko)
- The Shape of Hatred (憎悪のかたち, Shichiyosha, 1962)
- Gunjo (群青, Hayakawa Shobo 1963, later Kadokawa Bunko)
- The Samurai (ザ・サムライ, Togensha, 1963)
- A Livestock Named Murderous Intent (殺意という名の家畜, Jewelssha, 1963, later published by Kadokawa Bunko and Futaba Bunko )
- Three Stray Dogs (三匹の野良犬, Geibunsha, 1964)
- Cruel Blues (残酷なブルース, Geibunsha, 1964)
- Glass City (ガラスの街, Sanichi Shobo 1969)
- Others’ Castles (他人の城, Sanichi Shobo, 1969, later Kodansha Bunko )
- Green Era (緑の時代, Hayakawa Publishing, 1972, later Kadokawa Bunko, Hayakawa Bunko )
- Young People Die in the Sunlight (陽光の下、若者は死ぬ, Kadokawa Bunko, 1973) - This collection contains different short stories from the Arachi Publishing version published in 1960.
- Crazy Duet Jazz Novels (狂熱のデュエット ジャズ小説集, Kadokawa Bunko, 1973)
- Painting Knife Group (ペインティング・ナイフの群像, Shinchosha, 1974)
- Town Natural History (街の博物誌, Hayakawa Shobo, 1974, later published in paperback)
- Someday, the days will be glaring (いつか、ギラギラする日々, Bungeishunjū 1974, later published by Shueisha Bunko)
- Elegy in the Sun (陽だまりの挽歌, Kadokawa Shoten, 1974)
- Midday Improvisation (真昼のアドリブ, Novel and Essay, Ushio Publishing, 1975)
- Tomorrow the Birds Will Fly (明日こそ鳥は羽ばたく, Kadokawa Shoten, 1975, later Shueisha Bunko)
- Songs of My Earth: Indian Tetralogy (わが大地のうた インド四部作, Tokuma Shoten, 1975)
- Rogue Encyclopedia (悪漢図鑑, Kofusha Shoten 1976, later Shueisha Bunko)
- The detective is now on the iron plate (探偵はいま鉄板の上, Shodensha, 1976, later published by Tokuma Bunko)
- Jazz Book (ジャズの本, Seijisha, 1977)
- Farewell, My Dark Days (さらば、わが暗黒の日々, Futaba Shinsho, 1977, later Shueisha Bunko)
- Camouflage Forest (迷彩の森, Jitsugyo no Nihonsha 1977, later Kodansha Bunko)
- The Hawk or King Kandool: A collection of early poetic works by Norio Kono (鷹またはカンドオル王 河野典生初期詩的作品集, Midnight Series, 1978)
- The Mysterious Birds of Denpasar (デンパサールの怪鳥, Kaigai Publishing Department, 1978, later Shueisha Bunko)
- Natural history of the city continued (続・街の博物誌, Hayakawa Shobo, 1979)
- Impromptu Travel to India: Kono Yamashita Live in India co-authored by Yōsuke Yamashita (インド即興旅行 ヤマシタ・コーノ・ライブ・イン・インディア, Tokuma Shoten, 1979, later published by Tokuma Bunko)
- Kathmandu Yeti House (カトマンズ・イエティ・ハウス, Kodansha, 1980)
- Town Guide: Voices and Their Journeys (町の案内図 声、そして彼らの旅, Tokuma Shoten, 1980)
- Lucy Floats in the Sky with Explosives (ルーシーは爆薬持って空に浮かぶ, Shueisha, 1981)
- Agatha Christie Murder Case (アガサ・クリスティ殺人事件, Shodensha, 1983)
- That Was Bloody Saturday (あれは血の土曜日, Keibunsha Bunko, 1985)
- Genmu/Obesity Madness (幻夢・肥満狂死曲, Shodensha, 1985)
- The Counterattack of the Phantom Maoranni (怪人・毛酔翁（マオランニー）の逆襲, Shodensha, 1986)
- The Hawk of Alta (アルタの鷹, Tainki Shobo, 1989)
- Entertainment World Contemporary Studies: From Seiko Matsuda and Beat Takeshi to Mami Yamase and George Tokoro Living in Images (芸能界考現学 イメージの中を生きる 松田聖子、ビートたけしから、山瀬まみ、所ジョージへ, Tainki Shobo, 1990)
- Flying Clan (翔ぶ一族, Adrenalize 2018) *E-book original
- August is a cruel month: Showa Mystery Renaissance edited by Yuzuru Yamamae (八月は残酷な月 昭和ミステリールネサンス, Kobunsha Bunko, 2019)
- Castles of Others/Forms of Hatred: Japanese Hard-Boiled Complete Works 3 edited by Jiro Kitakami, Sanzo Kusaka, and Matsuko Sugie (他人の城／憎悪のかたち 日本ハードボイルド全集3, Sogen Mystery Bunko, 2022)
