= Ballad of a Gunman =

1967 film

- Original Italian Poster
- Directed by: Alfio Caltabiano
- Written by: Ernst R. von Theumer
- Produced by: Ernst R. von Theumer
- Starring: Antony Ghidra; Angelo Infanti
- Cinematography: Guglielmo Mancori
- Edited by: Alberto Gallitti
- Music by: Marcello Giombini
- Release date: 1967
- Running time: 98 minutes
- Countries: Italy; West Germany
- Language: Italian

Ballad of a Gunman, also known as Pistoleros and Ringo, Pray to Your God and Die (Italian: Ballata per un pistolero) is a 1967 Italian Spaghetti Western directed by Alfio Caltabiano and starring Antony Ghidra.

== Plot ==
The criminal brothers El Bedoja and Chiuchi have each their own gang. Together they rob a stagecoach. After they've just got rid of all witnesses by killing the passengers, they are already about to plan the next coup together. This time they want to do the bank of Mallintown. Its safe is considered unbreakable but it does open automatically shortly at certain times. The two gang leaders use the stagecoach as a kind of Trojan Horse to get gang members unrecognised into the town and moreover to have a big chest put into the strongroom. When the time has come for the safe to open, Chiuchi attacks the town as a diversionary tactic and lures the guards away. Then El Bedoja carries out the actual strike with his own gang, taking the now scarcely protected bank by surprise. Here he unites with the other gang members who have arrived with the stagecoach already.

El Bedoja and his men get away with a great deal of booty and bring a wounded accomplice to a farm where they coerce a woman into removing a bullet. Meanwhile, a travelling gunman named Hud, who happened to see the massacre in Mallintown, has followed them. He puts down all of El Bedoja's men but El Bedoja himself eludes. On hot pursuit Hud teams up with bounty hunter Rocco. They discover that the criminal siblings hide in an old mine and hire an old miner to close the entrance with dynamite. Yet El Bedoja and Chiuchi are on their guard. Hud wants to keep El Bedoja alive because he needs him as a witness to correct a miscarriage of justice. The bounty hunter on the other hand just wants to get the bounty and for that El Bedoja is worth dead just the same.

== Releases ==
Wild East released the film in a limited edition Region 0 NTSC DVD with the title "Pistoleros" on the cover art though the actual title on the film is "Ballata per un pistolero." DVD is currently out-of-print.
