= The Wandering Guitarist =

1969 film directed by Buichi Saitō

- Film poster
- Directed by: Buichi Saitō
- Written by: Ei Ogawa
- Screenplay by: Gan Yamazaki; Kenzaburō Hara
- Starring: Akira Kobayashi; Ruriko Asaoka; Joe Shishido; Nobuo Kaneko; Sanae Nakahara
- Cinematography: Kuratarō Takamura
- Edited by: Mitsuo Kondō
- Music by: Taichiro Kosugi
- Distributed by: Nikkatsu
- Release date: October 11, 1959 (Japan)
- Running time: 78 minutes
- Country: Japan
- Language: Japanese

The Wandering Guitarist (Japanese: ギターを持った渡り鳥, Hepburn: Guitar wo Motta Wataridori), also known as The Rambling Guitarist, is a 1959 Japanese action and yakuza film directed by Buichi Saitō. It stars Akira Kobayashi. This is the first film in Akira Kobayashi and Buichi Saitō's Wataridori series. The film made Akira Kobayashi a star and helped him gain national popularity.

== Plot ==
Shinji Taki is a former detective who now he is a vagabond with a guitar. In the port town he visits, Taki saves a yakuza member of the Akitsu clan in a bar fight and he is hired as a bouncer for the clan. Akitsu orders Taki to evict the inhabitants for the development of the town.

== Cast ==
- Akira Kobayashi as Shinji Taki
- Ruriko Asaoka as Yuki Akitsu
- Joe Shishido as Joe
- Nobuo Kaneko as Reizaburō Akitsu (Head of the Akitsu clan)
- Sanae Nakahara as Shōji Sumiko
- Misako Watanabe as Rie
- Kyōji Aoyama as Yasukawa
- Tomio Aoki as Tetsu

== Wataridori series ==
- Kuchibue ga Nagareru Minatomachi (1960)
- Naked Youth -A Story of Cruelty (1960)
- Sword and Devotion (1960)
- The Spook Cottage(1960)
- The Rambler under the Southern Cross(1961)
- Ōunabara wo Yuku Wataridori (1961)
- Kitakikōyori Wataridori Kitae Kaeru (1962)
