= Eiji Gō =

Japanese actor

- 郷鍈治
- Born: 29 May 1937; Osaka, Japan
- Died: 11 September 1992 (aged 55); Tokyo, Japan
- Occupation: Actor
- Years active: 1960-1982

Eiji Gō (郷 鍈治, Gō Eiji; 29 May 1937 – 11 September 1992) was a Japanese actor. He appeared in more than sixty films from 1960 to 1982.

== Career ==
Following his older brother, Jo Shishido, Gō joined the Nikkatsu studio in 1960 and made his film debut in The Warped Ones. He often played villains on both film and television. In 1978, he married the singer Naomi Chiaki and later retired from acting to run a talent agency.

== Filmography ==
Year	Title	Role	Notes
1960	Datô - Knock Down	Minami	
1960	The Warped Ones	Masaru	
1960	Umi no joji ni kakero	Nakai	
1960	Horobasha wa yuku	Garamasa	
1960	Kenju burai-chō Asunaki Otoko	Mishima	
1960	Tokai no sora no yôjimbô	Matsui	
1961	Hayauchi yarô	Matsui	
1961	Ôunabara o yuku wataridori	Tetsu	
1961	Rokudenashi yarô	Tetsu	
1961	Sandanju no otoko		
1961	Taiyô Umi o someru toki	Scrap	
1961	Kogenji		
1961	Tsuiseki	Shôzô Kishimoto	
1961	Kaikyô, chi ni somete	Nekomatsu	
1961	Arashi o tsukkiru jetto-ki	Goro Murakami	
1961	Kuroi kizu ato no burûsu	Joji	
1962	Kita kikô yori: Wataridori kita e kaeru	Masa	
1962	Sugata naki tsuisekisha	Goro Maki	
1962	Bôkyô no umi	Takemura	
1962	Yabai koto nara zeni ni naru		
1962	Tôkyô gozen-reiji		
1962	Nûki uchi sanshiro		
1962	Gân wa sâmushô otoko no utasâ		
1963	Youth of the Beast	Shigeru Takechi	
1963	Izu no odoriko	Tsurunoya's son	
1963	Gosen reiji no shutsugoku		
1963	Yogiri no burûsu		
1963	Tantei jimusho nijûsan - Zeni to onna ni yowai otoko	Honjô	
1963	Alibi	Rin	
1963	Tora no ko sakusen	Takeshi Sasagawa	
1963	Jigoku no saiten	Gôichi Gôda	
1963	Yûkyo burai		
1963	Shakunetsu no isu		
1964	Sâtsu rarete tama ruka (II)		
1964	Otoko no monsho: hana to nagadosu		
1964	Kuroi kaikyo	Tokita	
1964	Îki teiru okami		
1965	Nageta dice ga asu o yobu	Urabe	
1965	Kenjû yarô	Toastmaster	
1965	Shirotori	Kazuya Tomita	
1965	Abare kishidô	Matsuoka	
1965	Toba no mesu neko		
1965	Dainippon koroshiya den	Ino	
1965	Kuroi tobakushi: Daisu de korose		
1965	Yarô ni kokkyô wa nai	Man in sunglasses	
1965	Makao no ryû		
1965	Sanbiki no nora înu		
1965	Otoko no monshô ore wa kiru		
1965	Kenju mushuku-datsy goku no buruusu		
1965	Kenjû Buraichô: Nagaremono no mure		
1966	Kuroi tobakushi: Akuma no hidarite		
1966	Black Tight Killers	Sabu	
1966	Toba no mesu neko: sutemi no shôbu		
1966	Tokyo Drifter	Tanaka	
1966	Hone made aishite	Tetsu	
1966	Kaerazeru hatoba	Otaki	
1966	Ya zhou mi mi jing tan		
1966	Sanbiki no mesu neko		
1967	Yogiri yo kon'ya mo arigatô	Bill Tanaka	
1967	Hana o kuu mushi	Muneo Mutsu	
1967	Shichinin no yajû		
1967	Hatoba no taka	Tsuchiya	
1967	Shichinin no yajû: chi no sengen		
1967	Ketto	Kenzo Yamaoka	
1967	Wakaoyabun tanjô	Stekki-matsu	
1967	Ogon no yaro-domo		
1968	Sekido o kakeru otoko	Saeki	
1968	Daikanbu: Burai		
1968	Burai hijô	Kubo	
1968	Senketsu no toba	Gajuro	
1968	Âh himeyuri no tô	Lieutenant Sugiyama	
1968	Retaliation	Nakatsu	
1968	Burai: Kuro dosu	Yamaki	
1969	Sukeban: Jingi-yaburi		
1969	Burai: Barase	Tetsuji Hanai	
1969	Noboriryu tekkahada	Matsu	
1969	Zoku onna no keisatsu		
1969	Arakure		
1969	Zankoku onna rinchi		
1969	Onna no tehaishi: Ikebukuro no yoru		
1969	Yakuza wataridori: Akutôkagyô		
1969	Yakuza bangaichi		
1969	Shikakû rêtsuden		
1969	Nobori ryu yawa hada kaicho		
1969	Nihon zankyô-den		
1969	Jigoku no hamonjo		
1969	Daimon: jîgokû no sâkazukî		
1969	Arashi no yushatachi		
1969	Anego		
1970	Onna no keisatsu, midarecho	Shiro Takimura	
1970	Kaze no tengu		
1970	Nora-neko rokku: Mashin animaru	Sakura	
1970	Yakuza no Yoko Kao		
1970	Senketsu no kiroku		
1970	Nihon saidai no kaoyaku		
1970	Kirikomi		
1970	Jack no irezumi		
1971	Nora-neko rokku: Bôsô shûdan '71	President	
1971	Yoru no saizensen: Tôkyô maruhi chitai		
1971	Ryûketsu no kôsô		
1971	Kanto Kanbu-kai		
1971	Kantô hamonjô		
1971	Boryukudan norikomû		
1972	Yakuza to kôsô		
1972	Mayaku baishun G-men: Kyôfu no niku jigoku		
1972	Yakuza to kôsô: Jitsuroku Andô-gumi		
1973	Kamen Rider V3	Baron Fang	5 episodes
1973	Gokiburi deka	Kawakami	
1973	Kôkôsei burai hikae: Kanjirû Muramasa		
1973	Bodigaado Kiba	Toro	
1973	Kamen Raidaa Bui Surii tai Desutoron Kaijin	Doctor G	
1973	Gendai ninkyô-shi	Matsuda	
1973	Jitsuroku Andô-gumi: Shûgeki-hen		
1973	Bodigaado Kiba: Hissatsu sankaku tobi	Ryuzuka	
1974	Zero Woman: Red Handcuffs	Yoshihide Nakahara	
1974	Chokugeki! Jigoku-ken	Ichiro Sakura	
1974	The Yakuza	Spider	
1974	Chokugeki jigoku-ken: Dai-gyakuten	Ichiro Sakura	
1974	Abayo dachikô		
1975	Nihon ninkyo-do: gekitotsu-hen	Sojiro Yoshino	
1975	Graveyard of Honor	Makoto Sugiura	
1975	Dai dâtsu gokû		
1975	Daidatsugoku	Gota Namikawa	
1975	Karei-naru tsuiseki	Isao Shirosaki	
1975	The Bullet Train	Shinji Fujio	
1975	Kyokuskin kenka karate burai ken		
1976	Jitsuroku gaiden: Osaka dengeki sakusen	Ginji Hiraoka	
1976	Kozure satsujin ken		
1976	New Battles Without Honor and Humanity: Last Days of the Boss	Joe	
1976	Dasso yugi	Jaws	
1976	Yojôhan seishun garasu-bari	Sugimori	
1982	Kaseki no kouya	Yukihiko Yamazawa	(final film role)
