= Black Sun (1964 film) =

1964 film

- Theatrical poster
- Directed by: Koreyoshi Kurahara
- Screenplay by: Nobuo Yamada
- Based on: Under the Black Sun by Tensei Kono
- Starring: Tamio Kawachi; Chico Roland; Tatsuya Fuji
- Cinematography: Mitsuji Kanau
- Edited by: Akira Suzuki
- Music by: Toshiro Mayuzumi
- Production company: Nikkatsu
- Release date: April 19, 1964 (Japan)
- Running time: 95 minutes
- Country: Japan
- Language: Japanese

Black Sun (Japanese: 黒い太陽, Hepburn: Kuroi taiyō) is a 1964 Nikkatsu film directed by Koreyoshi Kurahara based on a story by Tensei Kono and starring Tamio Kawachi and Chico Lourant (often cited as Chico Roland). The film had many of the same cast, crew, and characters as Kurahara's earlier film The Warped Ones.

== Cast ==
- Tamio Kawachi as Akira
- Chico Roland as Gill
- Tatsuya Fuji as Akira's friend
- Shogen Shinda as the Engineer
- Yuko Chishiro as Yuki
- Hideji Ōtaki as Old Man of the Junk Shop
- Zenji Yamada as Owner

== Plot ==
At the start of the film, Akira commits larceny and buys a jazz record, an upbeat recording of "Six Bits Blues". In town, he encounters civil insurrection following the killing of an American soldier, presumably by one of his colleagues who is now missing. When Akira returns to his home and his dog Monk in a half-destroyed church, the missing soldier appears from behind a curtain and points a gun at him. His leg is injured, supposedly by the real assailant's firearm. Since the soldier (Gill) is African-American, Akira is convinced that he will appreciate the jazz record he bought and tries to use it as a way of communication. He plays a few songs on the record, but the G.I. responds badly and, in a fit of anger, attacks and kills Akira's dog.

Eventually, the soldier asks Akira to take him to the sea, for unknown reasons, and on their way there, they form a bond and become close friends. However, eventually they encounter MPs. In a moment of despair, the soldier sings "Six Bits Blues" as its original blues dirge, affecting Akira. Akira and Gill find their way to the top of a building, overlooking the sea, where Gill ties himself to a balloon. He asks Akira to cut the rope, hoping to float up in the air and from there, to see his mother one more time. Akira reluctantly fulfills his request and they all watch the soldier, buoyed on his airborne balloon, as he approaches the sea.

== Music ==
The film featured music by the Japanese composer Toshiro Mayuzumi. and American jazz drummer Max Roach.
