= The World Treasury of Science Fiction =

First edition Cover art by Bob Eggleton

The World Treasury of Science Fiction (ISBN 0-316-34941-0) is a science fiction anthology edited by David G. Hartwell, published by Little, Brown and Company in 1989.

== Contents ==
- Foreword by Clifton Fadiman
- Introduction by David G. Hartwell
- "Harrison Bergeron" by Kurt Vonnegut Jr.
- "Forgetfulness" by John W. Campbell Jr.
- "Special Flight" by John Berryman
- "Chronopolis" by J. G. Ballard
- "Triceratops" by Kono Tensei
- "The Man Who Lost the Sea" by Theodore Sturgeon
- "On the Inside Track" by Karl Michael Armer
- "The Golem" by Avram Davidson
- "The New Prehistory" by Rene Rebetez-Cortes
- "A Meeting with Medusa" by Arthur C. Clarke
- "The Valley of Echoes" by Gerard Klein
- "The Fifth Head of Cerberus" by Gene Wolfe
- "The Chaste Planet" by John Updike
- "The Blind Pilot" by Nathalie-Charles Henneberg
- "The Men Who Murdered Mohammed" by Alfred Bester
- "Pairpuppets" by Manuel van Loggem
- "Two Dooms" by C.M. Kornbluth
- "Tale of the Computer That Fought a Dragon" by Stanislaw Lem
- "The Green Hills of Earth" by Robert A. Heinlein
- "Ghost V" by Robert Sheckley
- "The Phantom of Kansas" by John Varley
- "Captain Nemo's Last Adventure" by Josef Nesvadba
- "Inconstant Moon" by Larry Niven
- "The Gold at the Starbow's End" by Frederik Pohl
- "A Sign in Space" by Italo Calvino
- "The Spiral" by Italo Calvino
- "The Dead Past" by Isaac Asimov
- "The Lens" by Annemarie van Ewyck
- "The Hurkle is a Happy Beast" by Theodore Sturgeon
- "Zero Hour" by Ray Bradbury
- "Nine Lives" by Ursula K. Le Guin
- "The Muse" by Anthony Burgess
- "The Public Hating" by Steve Allen
- "Poor Superman" by Fritz Leiber
- "Angouleme" by Thomas M. Disch
- "Stranger Station" by Damon Knight
- "The Dead Fish" by Boris Vian
- "I Was the First to Find You" by Kirill Bulychev
- "The Lineman" by Walter M. Miller Jr.
- "Tlön, Uqbar, Orbis Tertius" by Jorge Luis Borges
- "Codemus" by Tor Age Bringsvaerd
- "A Kind of Artistry" by Brian Aldiss
- "Second Variety" by Philip K. Dick
- "Weihnachtsabend" by Keith Roberts
- "I Do Not Love You, Doctor Fell" by Robert Bloch
- "Aye, and Gomorrah..." by Samuel R. Delany
- "How Erg the Self-inducting Slew a Paleface" by Stanislaw Lem
- "Nobody's Home" by Joanna Russ
- "Party Line" by Gerard Klein
- "The Proud Robot" by Lewis Padgett
- "Vintage Season" by Henry Kuttner and C.L. Moore
- "The Way to Amalteia" by Arkady and Boris Strugatsky
