= Youth of the Beast =

- Directed by: Seijun Suzuki
- Screenplay by: Ichiro Ikeda; Tadaaki Yamazaki
- Based on: Manhunt (人狩り) by Haruhiko Ôyabu
- Produced by: Keinosuke Kubo
- Starring: Jo Shishido; Ichiro Kijima; Misako Suzuki
- Cinematography: Kazue Nagatsuka
- Music by: Hajime Okumura
- Production company: Nikkatsu
- Release date: 21 April 1963 (Japan)
- Running time: 92 minutes
- Country: Japan
- Language: Japanese

Youth of the Beast (野獣の青春, Yajū no seishun) is a 1963 Japanese yakuza film directed by Seijun Suzuki. Much of the film is set in Tokyo, Japan.

== Synopsis ==
Joji Mizuno (Joe Shishido), a former Kobe Metropolitan Police Department detective fired after being convicted of embezzlement, is released from prison. During his incarceration, his partner, Detective Takeshita, died in an apparent lovers' suicide with a call girl. However, Mizuno believes that the adultery and the suicide were staged by Nomoto Enterprises, a yakuza group whose prostitution operations Takeshita was investigating. Posing as a gangster, Mizuno infiltrates the Nomoto organization in order to find out the truth. At Takeshita's memorial service, Mizuno promises his dead partner's wife, Kumiko (Misako Watanabe), that he will find her husband's killers.

Mizuno is partnered with a young soldier named Goro Minami (Eimei Esumi) and quickly earns the respect of both Minami and the eccentric head of the Nomoto group, Tetsuo Nomoto (Akiji Kobayashi), by re-securing protection payments from a business that had switched allegiances to the Sanko Family, Nomoto's sworn rivals. Sanko's second-in-command Shigeru Takechi (Eiji Gō), tries to kidnap Mizuno in retaliation, but Mizuno manages to turn the tables and takes Takechi hostage instead, forcing him to take him to his boss. Mizuno meets with Sanko Family head Shinzuke Onodera (Kinzo Shin) and surprises him by offering to spy on Nomoto for money.

Mizuno is approached by Keiko (Naomi Hoshi), one of Nomoto's mistresses who recognizes him as a cop from her days as a prostitute. She blackmails him into helping her identify and kill Nomoto's mysterious "sixth mistress", the one who secretly runs the prostitution racket, so she can take her place. Aside from Nomoto himself, the only one who knows the sixth mistress's identity is Nomoto's gay brother Hideo (Tamio Kawachi), who is infamous for going berserk and attacking anyone who impugns the reputation of their prostitute mother. Mizuno goes to the love hotel Hideo uses as his base of operations and tries to gather information by posing as a client, only to get into a fight with him after realizing that Hideo was involved in framing Takeshita. Ishizaki (Shiro Yanase), one of Nomoto's enforcers, breaks up the fight, and Mizuno is brought before Nomoto and interrogated about his reasons for prying into the prostitution ring. Under duress, Mizuno reveals that Keiko put him up to it and, luckily for him, Nomoto kills her before she can reveal Mizuno's identity.

Mizuno learns of a planned multimillion-yen drug deal between Nomoto Enterprises and an out of town group, the Ishiyama Family, so he brings the information to Onodera, laying out a plan for the Sanko men to steal the money from the Ishiyamas after the deal and make it look like Nomoto Enterprises are responsible. Takechi and his men rob the Ishiyama agents successfully, and just as Mizuno planned, Nomoto is blamed. However, one of Ishiyama's men recognizes Mizuno and makes him as a police officer. Mizuno is captured by Nomoto's men and tortured, but he manages to conceal his double-cross by telling them that he used to be a cop until he was caught and convicted for corruption.

Mizuno convinces Nomoto that the Sanko Family committed the robbery in retaliation for losing the protection racket Mizuno stole back from them. Nomoto sends Mizuno, Minami and Ishizaki to capture and question Takechi. The trio break into Takechi's apartment and hold his wife (Yuriko Abe) hostage while they wait for Takechi to come home. When Mizuno sees Takechi coming from the apartment's balcony, he tosses him a note warning of the ambush, but rather than heed his advice, Takechi bursts into his apartment with a gun drawn. A shootout ensues, during which Takechi, his wife, and Ishizaki are killed and Minami is gravely wounded.

With the police in pursuit, Mizuno and the weakened Minami flee to the nearby home of Takeshita's widow, who hides them. Mizuno calls Nomoto and lies that Takechi knew they were coming, meaning the Sanko Family may be planning an attack, then immediately calls Onodera and tells him of Takechi's death, setting the two gangs up to attack each other.

When Kumiko asks him what is happening, Mizuno explains his work as a double agent and his plan to provoke the Sanko and Nomoto clans into destroying each other to avenge her husband's murder. Nomoto sends his men to retrieve Mizuno and Minami, leaving Hideo behind to hold Kumiko hostage so she will not contact the police. When Mizuno returns to Nomoto headquarters, Nomoto reveals that he has learned of Mizuno's double-cross and has him chained to the ceiling to be tortured. However, before Nomoto can kill him, Mizuno is saved when the Sanko Family arrives and attacks Nomoto's mansion, leading to a massive shootout. After he realizes his gang will lose the battle, Onodera drives his car through the mansion's wall and detonates a bomb in a final kamikaze strike.

The explosion takes out most of Nomoto's men and gives Mizuno a chance to escape. Nomoto attacks him, and after a struggle, Mizuno subdues him and forces him to confess the identity of Takeshita's murderer - Kumiko, Takeshita's wife. Kumiko is Nomoto's sixth mistress and head of the prostitution ring, who married Takeshita in order to keep an eye on the movements of the police from the inside. When Takeshita discovered the truth and was preparing to expose his wife and Nomoto's crimes, she staged the double suicide, killing both him and the call girl herself. Kumiko is also the one who revealed Mizuno's true intentions to Nomoto. Nomoto overpowers the shocked Mizuno and prepares to kill him, but Minami shoots him first and then dies from his own wounds.

Mizuno returns to the Takeshita house and finds Kumiko and Hideo having a friendly chat. When Kumiko leaves the room, Mizuno enters and beats Hideo, then holds Kumiko at gunpoint and forces her to confess to the murder. Kumiko admits to having killed Takeshita but claims Nomoto made her do it, despite Nomoto claiming the opposite. Mizuno tricks her into insulting the Nomoto brothers' mother within earshot of Hideo, and then leaves her behind to be killed by him. Afterwards, Mizuno sends audio recordings he made of Nomoto and Kumiko's confessions to his former police superiors before departing.

== Cast ==
- Joe Shishido as Joji "Jo" Mizuno
- Akiji Kobayashi as Patriarch Tetsuo Nomoto
- Eimei Esumi as Goro Minami
- Misako Watanabe as Kumiko Takeshita
- Tamio Kawachi as Hideo Nomoto
- Kinzō Shin as Patriarch Shinzuke Onodera
- Eiji Gō as Captain Shigeru Takechi
- Shiro Yanase as Lieutenant Ken Ishizaki
- Nobuo Kaneko as Soichi Ozawa
- Seijun Suzuki as Detective Hirokawa
- Masao Shimizu as Patriarch Yosuke Ishiyama
- Naomi Hoshi as Keiko
- Yuzo Kiura as Minegishi Takeo
- Hiroshi Kono as Honma
- Yuriko Abe as Takechi's Wife

== Release ==
Youth of the Beast was released in Japan on April 21, 1963. It received an American release in the United States by Nikkatsu in 1993.

Youth of the Beast was released on DVD by the Criterion Collection on January 11, 2005. Eureka Entertainment released the film in on both Blu-ray and DVD release in 2014 as part of the Masters of Cinema range.

== Reception ==
In contemporary reviews in Japan, the film was generally ignored. The film was not placed in the year's top 40 films by Kinema Junpo and managed to place at 21st place in Eiga Hyron's through a single ballot vote.

From retrospective reviews, Michael Brooke of Sight & Sound described the film as the first of Suzuki's Nikkatsu films to feature "what became recognised (albeit far from immediately) as his characteristic approach", which Brooke described as "wildly over-composed and colour-coordinated (even the smoke billowing out of a wrecked car is a fetching reddish-brown)" stating that its "style and substance virtually indivisible and equally exhilarating." Brooke found that "Suzuki doesn't so much undermine conventional gangster flick cliches as turn them up to 11, creating a powerfully satiric effects in the process"

== Remake ==
John Woo announced in 2012 that he would direct a remake of Youth of the Beast titled Day of the Beast. The film is set to be produced by Woo and Terence Chang's Lion Rock Productions along with Nikkatsu. The film is set in Tokyo where a Westerner becomes entered into a gang war between the yakuza and Cold War Russian mafia. The film will be written by Rob Frisbee. Following the box-office disappointment of The Crossing, Woo and producer Terence Chang disbanded Lion Rock Productions.

== See also ==
- List of crime films of the 1960s
- List of Japanese films of 1963
- Seijun Suzuki filmography

== Footnotes ==
=== References ===
- Galbraith IV, Stuart (1996). The Japanese Filmography: 1900 through 1994. McFarland. ISBN 0-7864-0032-3.
