= Man Called Amen =

- Directed by: Alfio Caltabiano
- Written by: Dario Argento; Adriano Bolzoni; Alfio Caltabiano
- Cinematography: Riccardo Pallottini
- Edited by: Mario Morra
- Music by: Daniele Pattucchi
- Release date: 1972
- Country: Italy
- Language: Italian

Man Called Amen (Italian: Così sia, also known as They Called Him Amen and Therefore It Is) is a 1972 Italian Spaghetti Western comedy film directed by Alfio Caltabiano. The film was a box office success and generated an immediate sequel, They Still Call Me Amen (Mamma mia è arrivato così sia).

== Cast ==
- Luc Merenda: Amen
- Sydne Rome: Dorothy
- Alfio Caltabiano: Reverend Smith
- Míla Beran: Grandpa
- Tano Cimarosa: Chako
- Renato Cestiè: John
- Dante Maggio: Professor
- Furio Meniconi: Sheriff
