= Bootleggers (1969 film) =

1969 film

- Directed by: Alfio Caltabiano
- Written by: Ferdinando Baldi; Alfio Caltabiano; José Gutiérrez Maesso; Leonardo Martín
- Produced by: José Gutiérrez Maesso
- Starring: George Eastman; Wayde Preston
- Cinematography: Francisco Fraile
- Music by: Riz Ortolani
- Distributed by: Cineriz
- Release date: 1969
- Language: Italian

Bootleggers (Italian: Cinque figli di cane, Spanish: América rugiente) is a 1969 Italian-Spanish crime-action film written and directed by Alfio Caltabiano and starring George Eastman and Wayde Preston. Set in the U.S., it was shot between Spain and Amalfi.

== Cast ==
- George Eastman as McGowan aka "The Irish"
- Wayde Preston as Grimm Doyle
- Graziella Granata as Letizia
- Tano Cimarosa as Moncio
- Archie Savage as Jeremiah
- José Suárez as "The Engineer"
- Eduardo Fajardo as Sir Louis Baymond
- Nello Pazzafini as Gangster at Brothel
- Antonella Murgia as Mary
- Gianni Solaro as Inspector
- Sandro Dori as Mary's husband
- Tito García as Prison warden Charlie
- Goyo Lebrero as The Barber
- Gia Sandri as Brothel Madam
- Alan Collins as The Boss
- Paul Müller as Pythagoras
- Alfio Caltabiano as Card Player
