= Buichi Saitō =

Japanese film director

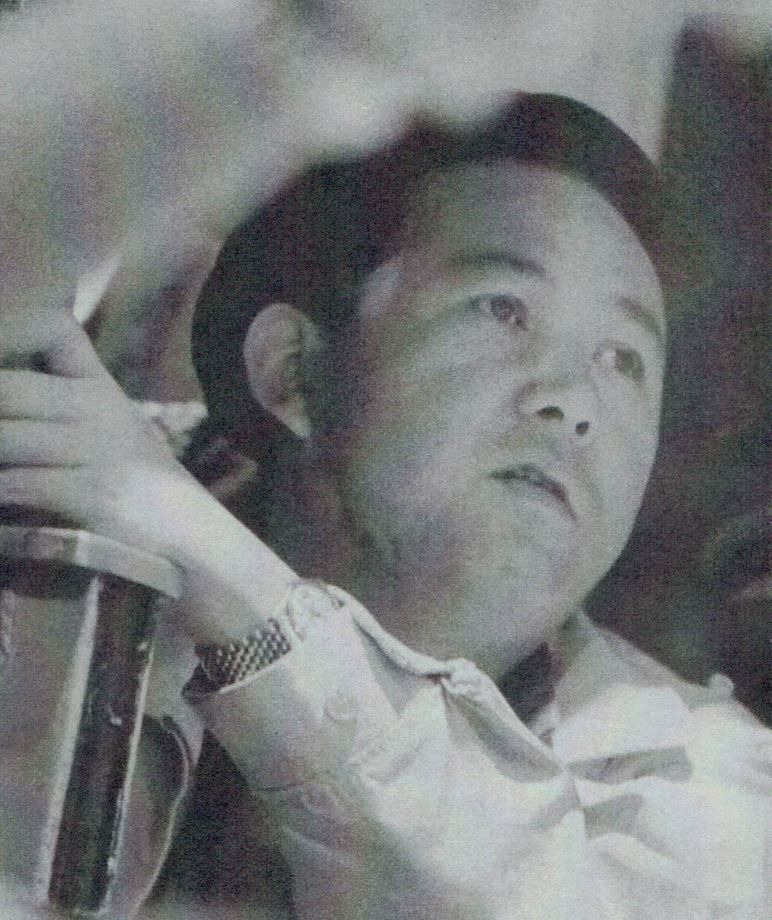
- Born: 27 January 1925; Chichibu, Saitama Prefecture, Japan
- Died: January 2011 (aged 86); Tokyo, Japan
- Occupation: Film director
- Years active: 1948-1999

Buichi Saitō (斎藤武市, Saitō Buichi; 27 January 1925 – January 2011) was a Japanese film director from Saitama Prefecture. His representative works included Wataridori series starring Akira Kobayashi, Farewell to Southern Tosa(1959) and Gazing at Love and Death(1964). Saitō often worked with Akira Kobayashi, Joe Shishido and Sayuri Yoshinaga.

After graduating Waseda University, he joined Shochiku Film and started working as an assistant director under Yasujirō Ozu and Kōzaburō Yoshimura etc. In 1954, he transferred to Nikkatsu Film and made his director debut in the 1956 film Anesan no Oyomeiri.

== Selected filmography ==
=== Film ===
- Early Summer (1951) (Assistant director)
- The Flavor of Green Tea over Rice (1952) (Assistant director)
- Tokyo Story (1953) (Assistant director)
- Early Spring (1956) (Assistant director)
- They Came of Age (1958)
- Waterfront Outlaws (1959)
- Farewell to Southern Tosa (1959)
- The Wandering Guitarist (1959)
- The Blue Beast (1960)
- Naked Youth -A Story of Cruelty (1960)
- Sword and Devotion (1960)
- Joe of Aces-Gambling for a Living aka Rokudenashi Kagyo (1961)
- Joe of Aces-Give and Take (1961)
- Tekaba Yaburi (1964)
- Gazing at Love and Death (1964)
- The Song of Love (1965)
- Honemade Aishite (1967)
- Hippie Love (1967)
- The Sweet Interns (1968)
- Akuoyabun tai Daitai (1971)
- Kantō Kyōdai Jingi (1971)
- The Valiant Red Peony Pt.8 (1972)
- Sannin no Onna Yoru no Chō aka Night Butterflies (1972)
- Yakuza Wolf 2: Extend My Condolences (1972)
- Lone Wolf and Cub: Baby Cart in Peril (1972)
- Horror of the Giant Vortex (1978)
- Ruten no umi (1990)

=== Television ===
- Lone Wolf and Cub series
- Oshizamurai Kiichihōgan (1973–74)
- Unmeitōge (1974)
- Amigasa Jūbei (1975)
