= Comandamenti per un gangster =

- Directed by: Alfio Caltabiano
- Screenplay by: Alfio Caltabiano; Dario Argento
- Story by: Alfio Caltabiano; Dario Argento
- Produced by: Salvatore Argento
- Starring: Ljuba Tadic; Alfio Caltabiano; Dante Maggio
- Cinematography: Milorad Markovic
- Edited by: Eugenio Alabiso
- Music by: Ennio Morricone
- Production companies: Triumph Film 67; Prodi Cinematografica; Avala Film
- Distributed by: D.C.I.
- Release dates: 22 May 1968 (Italy); 1968 (Yugoslavia)
- Running time: 96 minutes
- Countries: Italy; Yugoslavia
- Box office: ₤106.073 million

Comandamenti per un gangster (Commandments for a Gangster) is a 1968 gangster film directed by Alfio Caltabiano

== Production ==
Comandamenti per un gangster was Alfio Caltabiano's second film as a director. It was co-written by film critic and future director Dario Argento. The films script showcases several traits that would later become part of Argento's directorial career. This includes an unseen murderer with black gloves, shots from a murderer's point of view and having the murderer being identified by a physical detail, a scar on his face. The film was shot on location in Yugoslavia.

== Release ==
Comandamenti per un gangster was released in Italy on 22 May 1968 where it was distributed by D.C.I. It grossed a total of 106.073 million Italian lire on its release. It was released in Yugoslavia as Poslednji obracun in 1968.

== Reception ==
In a contemporary review, Pietro Bianchi wrote in Il Giorno that the film was "a skillful attempt at applying the Western formula to the Gangster movie trappings"

== See also ==
- List of crime films of the 1960s
- List of Italian films of 1968
- List of Yugoslav films of the 1960s

== Notes ==
=== References ===
- Curti, Roberto (2013). Italian Crime Filmography, 1968-1980. McFarland. ISBN 978-0786469765.
