= Alfio Caltabiano =

Italian actor (1932–2007)

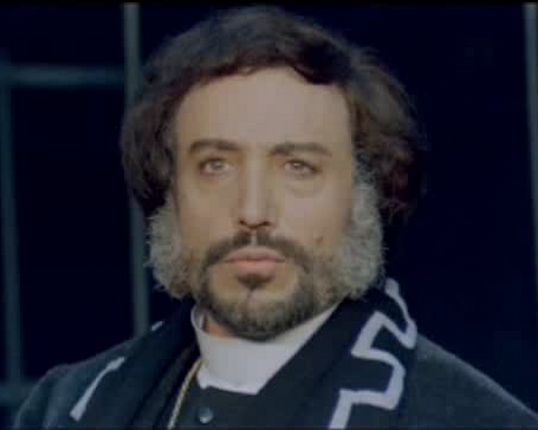
- Caltabiano in Italian Graffiti (1973)
- Born: 17 July 1932; Pistoia, Tuscany, Kingdom of Italy
- Died: 23 June 2007 (aged 74); Rome, Italy
- Occupations: Actor; writer; director
- Years active: 1955–1977 (film)

Alfio Caltabiano (1932–2007) was an Italian actor, screenwriter and film director.

== Partial filmography ==
- Il principe dalla maschera rossa (1955)
- Messalina (1960)
- La strada dei giganti (1960)
- The Colossus of Rhodes (1961) – Creonte
- Barabbas (1961) – Gladiatior Trainer (uncredited)
- The Son of Captain Blood (1962) – Man fighting at Dock (uncredited)
- Colossus of the Arena (1962) – Psychios
- I Am Semiramis (1963) – Zagos, Dardanian (uncredited)
- Goliath and the Sins of Babylon (1963) – Meneos
- Kali Yug: Goddess of Vengeance (1963) – The Crie
- The Mystery of the Indian Temple (1963) – The Crie
- Seven Slaves Against the World (1964) – Gladiatore
- La vendetta di Spartacus (1964)
- Two Sergeants of General Custer (1965) – Nervous Buffalo
- Seven Rebel Gladiators (1965) – Vadius
- Erik, the Viking (1965)
- Colorado Charlie (1965) – Creonte
- For Love and Gold (1966) – Arnolfo Mano-di-ferro
- Star Pilot (1966) – Artie
- Ballad of a Gunman (1967) – El Bedoja
- Comandamenti per un gangster (1968) – Five Cents
- Bootleggers (1969) – Card Player
- A Sword for Brando (1970) – The Count
- Man Called Amen (1972) – Reverend 'Ladrone' Smith
- Italian Graffiti (1973) – Bug Morano
- Oremus, Alleluia e Così Sia (1973) – Reverend Smith
- Keoma (1976) – Member of Caldwell's Gang
- California (1977) – Whittaker Accomplice (final film role)

== Bibliography ==
- Roberto Curti. Italian Crime Filmography, 1968–1980. McFarland, 2013.
