= Noriko Matsumoto (actress) =

Japanese actress and stage director (1935–2014)

- 松本 典子
- Born: 9 August 1935; Tokyo, Japan
- Died: 26 March 2014 (aged 78); Setagaya, Tokyo, Japan
- Occupations: Actress; stage director
- Years active: 1954–2001
- Spouse: Kunio Shimizu (died 2014)

Kazuko Shimizu (Japanese: 清水 和子, Hepburn: Shimizu Kazuko; 9 August 1935 – 26 March 2014), known professionally as Noriko Matsumoto (松本 典子, Matsumoto Noriko), was a Japanese actress and stage director. She and her husband, playwright Kunio Shimizu, were co-founders of the stage company Mokutōsha.

== Biography ==
Kazuko Shimizu was born on 9 August 1935 in Tokyo. and educated at Ohtani Gakuen and the Haiyuza Theatre Company training school. She joined the Mingei Theatre Company in 1959.

After her debut in Kiyomi Hotta's 1954 production of Shima, Matsumoto began appearing in stage productions, including Jukichi Uno's production of Three Sisters. In 1976, she and her husband Kunio Shimizu were among the co-founders of the stage company Mokutōsha, where she later worked as a leading actor and in the 1990s began working as a director. Her last performance was at the June 2001 Theater X production of Joyū N. Outside of the stage, also had some film and television credits, including as Fumiko in The Warped Ones.

Matsumoto won two Kinokuniya Theatre Awards: in 1979 for her performances in Mokutōsha's production of Gakuya and Janjan's production of Jochū-tachi; and in 1984 for her performance in Mokutōsha's production of Love Letter: Ai to Hi no Seishin Bunseki. She was awarded a 1987 Arts Encouragement Award for her performance at Tango at the End of Winter.

Following a month of hospitalization, Matsumoto died on 26 March 2014 of interstitial pneumonia at a hospital in Setagaya, aged 78. Her funeral was restricted to close relatives, with Shimizu serving as the chief mourner.
