= Detective Bureau 2-3: Go to Hell Bastards! =

- Japanese release poster
- Directed by: Seijun Suzuki
- Written by: Iwao Yamazaki; Haruhiko Oyabu (novel)
- Produced by: Shozo Ashida
- Starring: Joe Shishido; Reiko Sasamori; Tamio Kawachi; Nobuo Kaneko
- Cinematography: Shigeyoshi Mine
- Edited by: Akira Suzuki
- Music by: Harumi Ibe
- Distributed by: Nikkatsu
- Release date: 27 January 1963
- Running time: 89 minutes
- Country: Japan
- Language: Japanese

Detective Bureau 2-3: Go to Hell Bastards! (探偵事務所２３ くたばれ悪党ども, Tantei Jimusho 23: Kutabare Akutōdomo; aka Detective Bureau 23: Down with the Wicked) is a 1963 Japanese yakuza film directed by Seijun Suzuki in the vein of the Nikkatsu Studio's "borderless action cinema." It starred Joe Shishido as Hideo Tajima.

This was the first part of a series which ended after the second installment. That second film, Detective Bureau 2-3: A Man Weak to Money and Women, with Shishido returning as Hideo Tajima, was directed by Nozomu Yanase and released later the same year (1963).

== Plot ==
Two rival gangs (the Otsuki and the Sakura) are shaken by the new arrival of a third, secret gang who is stealing arms from both them and U.S. arms shipments. Keen to track them down, private detective Hideo Tajima (Joe Shishido) who runs a small company called 'Detective Bureau 2-3' tips off the police about a possible hit against a new stash of weaponry. With the police's help, providing him with a new identity (with a new name; Tanaka), Tajima infiltrates the secret gang.

Upon contact he is kept in a room isolated from the rest of the gang as they do a background search; during this time he begins to speak to a girl who gives him food and water, he finds out that she is the mistress to the gang boss. The gang find Tajima's (fake) address and question the unusual occurrence that he supposedly lives in a Catholic church. Tajima explains that his father is a priest, police disguised as clergymen and parish members corroborate this story when the gang goes to investigate. Having gained the gang's trust, Tajima begins to fall for the boss' mistress meanwhile a new shipment of arms is slated to be brought into Japan soon.

Tajima tapes an incriminating conversation and calls the police to see if they can arrest as many gang members as possible through their contacts in the Otsuki and Sakura. The third gang boss, however, discovers Tajima's secret identity. Tajima and the mistress lock themselves in an underground munitions room where the boss' mistress reveals that although she is a "whore at heart", the gang boss is impotent so she remains a virgin. Unable to kill them within the wall's confines, the secret gang set the room alight. Tajima shoots up into the street to alert the police through the presence of the black smoke coalescing within the room and throws the tape up through the hole to ensure its reception.

The police follow Tajima's advice to direct all three gangs to a warehouse on the seafront and corner them. Having succeeded in crippling violent crime, Tajima returns his gun and fake ID to the police captain and takes his now-girlfriend away on holiday past and through a rebuilding boom-era Japan, bypassing the detective bureau.

== Release ==
Nikkatsu distributed the film when it was originally released in Japan on 27 January 1963.

=== Home media ===
Arrow Video released a remastered edition for Region 2. Kino International released the film on DVD in North America in 2009.
