= Tamio Kawachi =

Japanese actor (1938–2018)

- 川地民夫
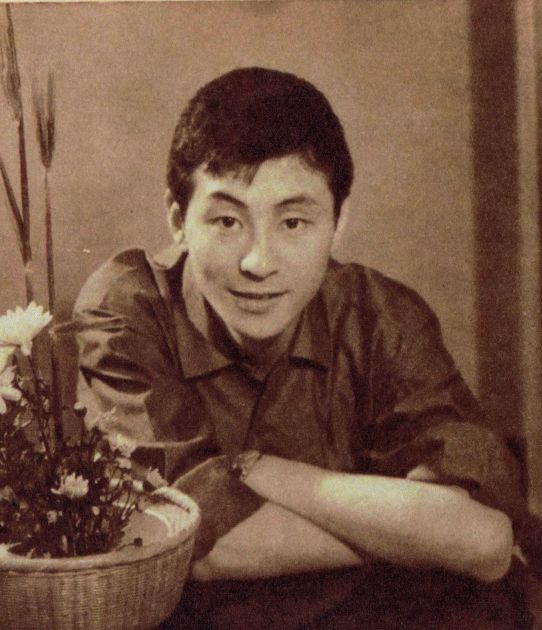
- Born: 21 July 1938; Zushi, Kanagawa, Japan
- Died: 10 February 2018 (aged 79); Yokosuka, Kanagawa, Japan
- Other name: Tamio Kawaji
- Occupation: Actor
- Years active: 1958–2017

Tamio Kawachi (Japanese: 川地 民夫, Hepburn: Kawachi Tamio; 21 July 1938 – 10 February 2018; sometimes transliterated as Tamio Kawaji) was a Japanese actor.

== Career ==
Kawachi was a student at Kanto Gakuin University when Yujiro Ishihara, one of his neighbors in Zushi, Kanagawa, invited him to join the Nikkatsu studio. He made his debut in A Slope in the Sun (1958) playing Ishihara's younger brother. The studio initially sold him as one of the "Bad Trio" along with Akira Kobayashi and Tadao Sawamoto. He appeared in films by Koreyoshi Kurahara and Seijun Suzuki and is probably most known abroad for his starring roles in Kurahara's The Warped Ones (1960) and Black Sun (1964). Kawachi eventually left Nikkatsu for the Toei Company, and co-starred in the 9-film Mamushi kyōdai series with Bunta Sugawara in the 1970s. He also acted on television, with his last acting appearance being a TV mystery in 2017. He was also known for his recurring role as Inspector General Sawaii in Ultraman Tiga.

== Selected filmography ==
=== Film ===
- A Slope in the Sun (1958) - Tamio Takagi
- Chi to ai no shuppatsu (1958) - Yasushi Nanjô
- Wakai kawa no nagare (1959) - Yasuo Kitaoka
- Kenjû 0 gô (1959) - Yoshio
- Wakai keisha (1959) - Yasuo Kawase
- Kaitei kara kita onna (1959) - Toshio
- Otoko nara yume o miro (1959)
- Kizû tsukeru yajû (1959)
- Hîrusa gari no boryoku (1959)
- Arashi o yobu yûjô (1959) - Kenji Kawazoe
- Zassô no yô na inochi (1960) - Jun'ichi Asano
- Yami ni hikaru me (1960) - Kimura Shigeo
- Wataridori itsu mata kaeru (1960)
- The Warped Ones (1960) - Akira
- Everything Goes Wrong (1960) - Jirô Sugita
- Shôjo (1961) - Yoshizô Yashiro
- Aoi me no sugao (1961) - Makoto Takayama
- Zurari oretacha yojinbo (1961)
- Yabure kaburô (1961)
- Taiyô wa kurutteru (1961)
- Kitakami yakyoku (1961)
- Îki te ita norâ inu (1961)
- Hai tiin yakuza (1962)
- Nikui an-chikushô (1963) - Hiroshi Ozaki
- Ore ni kaketa yatsura (1962)
- Detective Bureau 2-3: Go to Hell Bastards! (1963) - Manabe
- Nanika omoroi koto nai ka (1963) - Kenji Yoshioka
- Youth of the Beast (1963) - Hideo Nomoto
- Gosen reiji no shutsugoku (1963)
- Oka wa hanazakari (1963) - Masaya Nozaki
- Ôkami no ôji (1963) - Ginji Tachibana
- Red Handkerchief (1964)
- Cruel Gun Story (1964) = Kenjû zankoku monogatari- Takizawa
- Hana to dotô (1964)
- Kon'nichiwa akachan (1964) - Toshio Tanimura
- Black Sun (1964) - Akira
- Onna no uzu to fuchi to nagare (1964)
- Kawachi zoro: kenja jamo (1964)
- Kawachi zoro: doke chichu (1964)
- Story of a Prostitute (1965) - Pvt. Shinkichi Mikami
- Shojo sôshitsu (1965)
- Kaitô X - Kubi no nai otoko (1965) - Kôji Ôsato
- Otoko no monshô - ruten no okite (1965)
- Kawachi zoro: abare cho (1965)
- Kawachi Karumen (1966) - Seiji Takano
- Oozora ni kanpai (1966)
- Tokyo Drifter (1966) - Tatsuzo, The Viper
- Nihon ninkyôden: hana no toseinin (1966)
- Watashi, chigatteiru kashira (1966) - Yoshida
- Hoshi no flamenco (1966) - Tetsu Watase
- Sâsurai ha ore no ûnmei (1966)
- Eiko eno chôsen (1966)
- Gappa: The Triphibian Monster (1967) - Hiroshi Kurosaki
- Kimi wa koibito (1967) - Kawaji
- Kanto mo hîrougozansû (1967)
- Outlaw: Gangster VIP (1968) - Isamu Tsujikawa
- Musume no kisetsu (1968)
- Shima wa moratta (1968) - Naruse
- Burai: Kuro dosu (1968) - Sueo Shige
- Savage Wolf Pack (1969)
- Zankoku onna rinchi (1969)
- Yôru o hirakû - onna no ichibâ (1969)
- Yakuza hijoshi - mushyo kyodai (1969)
- Shikakû rêtsuden (1969)
- Nobori ryu yawa hada kaicho (1969)
- Nihon zan kyôsen (1969)
- Nihon zankyô-den (1969)
- Ai no kaseki (1970) - Journalist
- Hatoba onna no burusu (1970) - Chiba
- Sakariba jingi (1970)
- Abarê cho han (1970)
- A Man′s World (1971) - Funada
- Yomigaeru daichi (1971) - Yokoyama
- Sannin no onna: Yoru no cho (1971)
- Mamushi no kyôdai: Orei mairi (1971)
- Chôeki Tarô: Mamushi no kyôdai (1971)
- Mamushi no kyôdai: Chôeki jûsankai (1972)
- Mamushi no kyôdai: Shôgai kyôkatsu jûhappan (1972)
- Kînagashî hyâkunîn (1972)
- Battles Without Honor and Humanity (1973) - Kanbara Seiichi
- Mamushi no kyôdai: Musho gurashi yonen-han (1973)
- Hissatsu Shikakenin (1973) - Gozamatsu no Magohachi
- Mamushi no kyôdai: Kyôkatsu san-oku-en (1973)
- Gokudo VS Mamushi (1974)
- Mamushi no kyôdai: Futari awasete sanjuppan (1974)
- Mamushi to aodaishô (1975) - Masaru
- Kigeki: Tokudashi - Himo tengoku (1975) - Giichi-san
- The Bullet Train (1975) - Satō
- Bodo shimane keimusho (1975) - Dog breeder
- Kawachi no ossan no uta (1976)
- Shinjuku yoidore banchi: Hitokiri tetsu (1977)
- Inubue (1978) - Chief navigator
- Dai Nippon teikoku (1982) - Furukawa
- Jotei (1983)
- Chi-n-pi-ra (1984) - Otani
- Kekkon annai misuterî (1985) - Masao Sekine
- Break Town monogatari (1985) - Niiyama
- Beppin no machi (1989) - Tomizawa, Reiko's Dad
- Kagerô (1991) - Shinkichi, Hashiba
- Gorotsuki (1992)
- Rakuyô (1992)
- Shishioh-tachi no saigo (1993) - Saeki
- Sukiyaki (1995) - Ryohel Mihara
- Ultraman Tiga: The Final Odyssey (2000) - Inspector General Sōichirō Sawai
- Gokudô kyôfu dai-gekijô: Gozu (2003)
- Waru: kanketsu-hen (2006)
- Superior Ultraman 8 Brothers (2008) - Secretary-General of the United Nations Sawai (final film role)

=== Television ===
- G-Men '75 (1975) (ep1, 14, 59, 89 Guest)
- Ultraman Tiga (1996–1997) – Inspector General Sōichirō Sawai
- Ultraman Dyna (1997–1998) – Inspector General Sōichirō Sawai
