= The Lovemakers (band) =

American electropop/new wave band

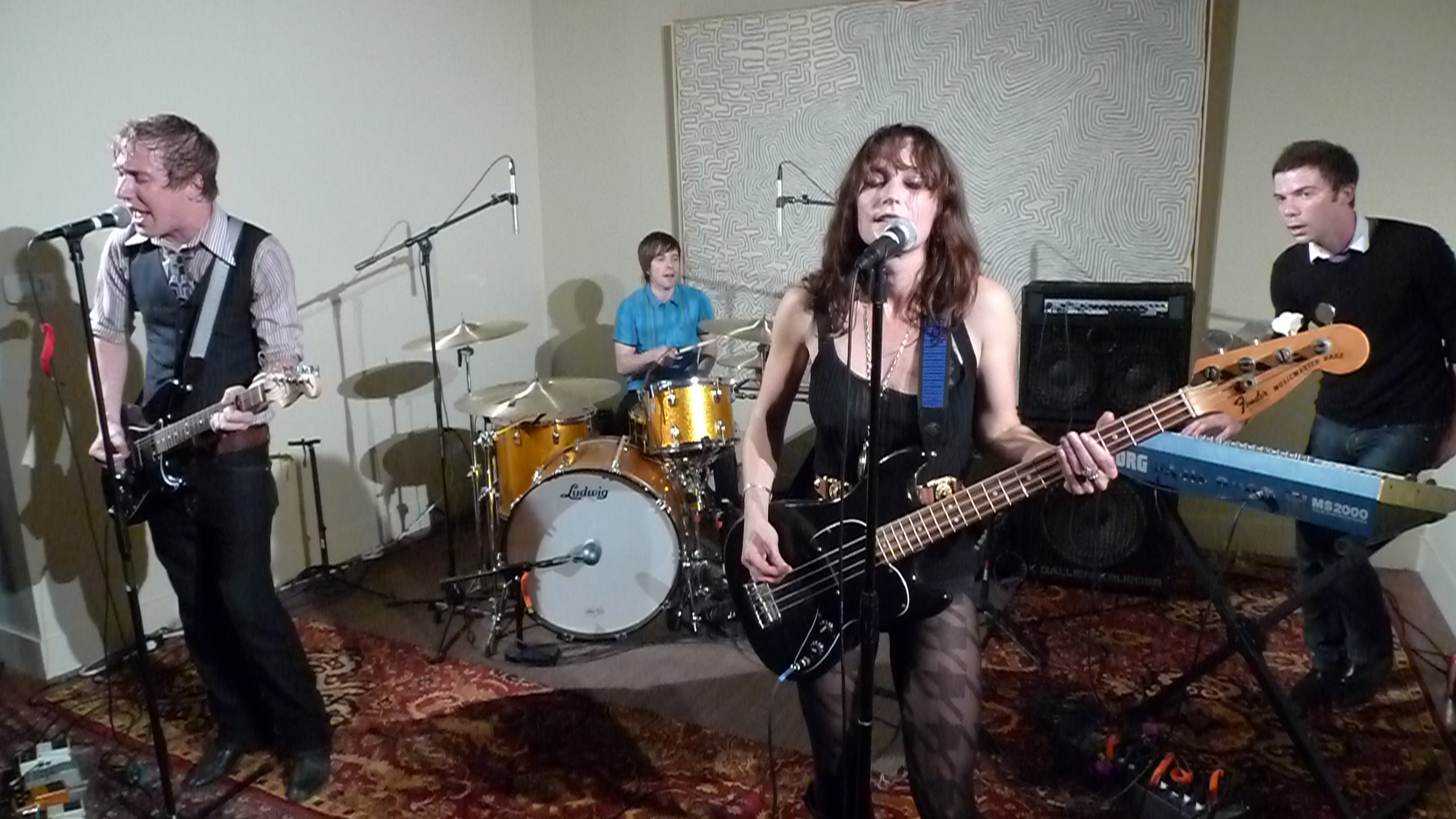
- The Lovemakers in concert at Talking House Productions' studios, San Francisco, July 2009

Background information
- Origin: Oakland, California, United States
- Genres: New wave, electropop
- Years active: 2002–2009, 2014-2020
- Labels: Interscope, Fuzz, Talking House Records
- Members: Scott Blonde; Lisa Light; Julia Johari; Michael Gorman
- Past members: Jason Proctor; Michael Urbano; Cary LaScala; Gareth Lloyd; Brandon Arnovick; Ken Hard
- Website: http://www.thelovemakers.net/

The Lovemakers is an electropop/new wave band from Oakland, California. The band was formed in the spring of 2002 by Scott Blonde (guitar, vocals) and Lisa Light (vocals, bass) who are the two core members. Light and Blonde met in 2002 via Blonde's manager, whom Light was dating at the time. Shortly afterward Light left her boyfriend, and she began dating Blonde and joined his band Applesaucer. They were forced out of the band, reportedly for making out during practice. Afterward they formed their own band naming themselves The Lovemakers after the Japanese sexploitation film The Weird Lovemakers. They joined with Jason Proctor on keyboards to form the initial lineup.

The Lovemakers released a self-titled record in 2003. A second record, Times of Romance, was released on August 23, 2005 on Interscope Records new imprint Cherrytree. A single, "Prepare for the Fight", was put out in advance of the album's release date. The album also features Josh Freese on drums. In 2006, Proctor departed to return to his day job as a computer programmer full-time.

In 2007, The Lovemakers signed to Fuzz, a fledgling San Francisco record label, who released their third album Misery Loves Company on July 24, 2007. The album is an enhanced EP featuring 5 songs and 5 corresponding high-quality music videos. A single, "Whine & Dine", was put out in advance of the release date. For Misery Loves Company and the subsequent touring the band featured Brandon Arnovick on keyboards and Kenneth Hard on drums.

In 2008, The Lovemakers began a production deal with independent music company Talking House Productions (San Francisco) and recorded their fourth album Let's Be Friends, at the label's in-house studio with Talking House producer Marc Weibel. Arnovick and Hard had departed the band by this time, and Michael Urbano joined the group to record the drums on all but one track on the album.

Talking House Records released Let's Be Friends in September 2009 (the label used The Lovemakers' own mark on the cover art in a nod to the band's DIY ethic). The band followed the release with a supporting tour, with Cary LaScala on drums and Gareth Lloyd on synthesizer for live performances. The label released an advance single called "See What I Wanna See" on August 11, 2009, which was featured by iTunes on its "WHAT'S HOT" list and its "NEW AND NOTEWORTHY" list. The second single off Let's Be Friends, "Love is Dead," was featured as a Single of Week on iTunes during the week of September 9, 2009.

In December 2009, The Lovemakers announced they would play their last show on New Year's Eve in Oakland at Ghost Town Gallery. This site is near the location of their first performance 7 years earlier.

The band was scheduled to perform a one-time-only reunion show on February 14, 2014 (Valentine's Day) at The Rickshaw Stop in San Francisco. According to the band's website, the Lovemakers then reformed in July 2014, with a plan to play hand-picked shows, and work on new material in the studio. This was followed by a single released in July 2014, "Beautiful Master," co-written by Chris Stein of Blondie, produced by Jeff Saltzman, and mixed by Mikael Johnston. More shows followed, about one every two or three months, through 2015 and into 2020.

== Discography ==
Albums

- The Lovemakers (EP) (April 5, 2003)
- Times of Romance (August 23, 2005)
- Misery Loves Company (EP) (July 24, 2007)
- Let's Be Friends (September 15, 2009)
- "Cassingles" (A/B singles) (September, 2016)
- "Cassingles #2" (A/B singles) (February, 2018)

Singles

- "Shake That Ass"
- "Prepare for the Fight"
- "Whine & Dine"
- "See What I Wanna See"
- "Love is Dead"
