= Joe Shishido =

Japanese actor (1933–2020)

- 宍戸 錠
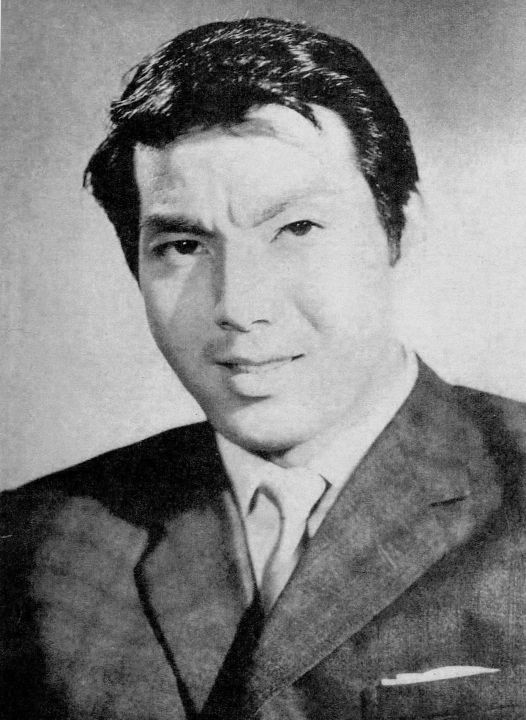
- Joe Shishido in 1961
- Born: December 6, 1933; Kita, Osaka, Japan
- Died: January 18, 2020 (aged 86)
- Occupation: Actor
- Years active: 1955–2016
- Height: 1.74 m (5 ft 8 1/2 in)
- Children: Kai Shishido

Joe Shishido (宍戸 錠, Shishido Jō; December 6, 1933 – January 18, 2020) was a Japanese actor recognizable for his intense, eccentric yakuza film roles. He appeared in some 300 films but is best known in the West for his performance in the cult film Branded to Kill (1967). In Japan, he is also known by the nickname Joe the Ace (エースのジョー, Ēsu no Jō) for his popular role in the Western Quick Draw Joe (1961).

== Early life ==
Joe Shishido was born in the Kita Ward of Osaka, Japan. He had two older brothers, one younger sister and a younger brother who also became an actor under the name Eiji Go. Shishido attended schools in Tokyo and Miyagi. In 1952, he graduated from high school and enrolled in the theatre course at Nihon University. Two years later, he auditioned for the Nikkatsu Company's New Face contest. He was one of 21 selected from 8,000 applicants. Shishido dropped out of school and began working for Nikkatsu, appearing in small film roles.

== Nikkatsu ==
In 1954, Joe Shishido signed on as a contract player at Nikkatsu. Studio bosses encouraged Shishido to change his name, as popular tales of the samurai Miyamoto Musashi contained a villain named Shishido, and they were trying to model him into a romantic lead. Shishido refused. His first major role was in Policeman's Diary (1955, Keisatsu Nikki), in which he played a young patrolman who challenges a police chief in a kendo (bamboo sword fighting) match.

Displeased with his middling success in melodramas and "blandly handsome features", Shishido underwent cheek augmentation surgery in 1957. His altered look has been described both as "ruggedly handsome", and as chipmunk-like. Afterward, he began getting bigger parts, predominantly as villains in action movies. Two of his biggest roles in the late 1950s and early 1960s were opposite Akira Kobayashi in the Wataridori ("Birds of Passage") series, and Keiichirō Akagi in the Kenjū Buraichō series. When Akagi died in a go-karting accident, Shishido replaced him as Nikkatsu's action star. His first starring role was in Joe of Aces-Gambling for a Living aka Rokudenashi Kagyō directed by Buichi Saitō. The film was a success and spawned two immediate sequels, Joe of Aces-Body Guard and Joe of Aces-Give and Take (1961). He gained national popularity and the lifelong nickname "Joe the Ace" ("Eisu no Jō") for his eponymous role in Quick Draw Joe (1961), in which he played the "third-fastest draw in the world—0.65 seconds."

Though he worked predominantly in comic action roles, Shishido also gained a tough-guy loner image in such films as Seijun Suzuki's Youth of the Beast, (1963) in which he played an ex-cop who infiltrates two rival yakuza gangs. Shishido is best known in the West for films he made with Suzuki, e.g. Detective Bureau 2-3: Go to Hell, Bastards! (1963) and Gate of Flesh (1964). His best known film internationally is Suzuki's Branded to Kill (1967), in which he starred as the number three hitman in Japan. The film received only moderate success on its original release, due largely to poor promotion by Nikkatsu stemming from the studio's growing disaffection with Suzuki, which ended with the director's firing. Shishido later recalled seeing the film with friends and finding the theater nearly deserted.

Nikkatsu action movies began to lose favour through the late 1960s and production was scaled back resulting in fewer jobs for Shishido. He began taking roles with other companies and in television, which were primarily of a comic nature. He also starred in Nikkatsu "new action" films such as the all-star vehicle Yakuza Bird of Passage: Bad Guys' Work (1969), with Akira Kobayashi and Tetsuya Watari, and Bloody Battle (1971). In 1971, Shishido ended his contract and left the failing company, which had transitioned into softcore roman porno ("romantic pornography") films in order to stay profitable.

== Free agent ==
Joe Shishido continued to work in television and appeared in films for other studios such as the fifth installment of Toei's highly popular yakuza series Battles Without Honor and Humanity: Final Episode (1974). By this time, yakuza films had begun to lose favour with the public, and Shishido ceased appearing in those types of roles. Over the next 20 years, he focused predominately on television with occasional film appearances, including Exchange Students (1982), Bound for the Fields, the Mountains, and the Seacoast (1986) and A Mature Woman (1994). His roles in Kaizo Hayashi's Mike Hama: Private Eye (a play on Mike Hammer) trilogy marked a reemergence of his tough-guy persona. The trilogy included The Most Terrible Time in My Life (1994), The Stairway to the Distant Past (1995) and The Trap (1996).

On February 4, 2013, his house was destroyed in a fire. He was not at home at the time, and no one was injured.

Shishido was found dead in his home on January 21, 2020, having died on January 18, 2020. He was survived by his three children.

== Partial filmography ==
=== Films ===
- 1955 Keisatsu Nikki - directed Seiji Hisamatsu
- 1955 The Maid's Kid - d. by Tomotaka Tasaka
- 1957 Shori-sha
- 1958 Rusty Knife - d. Toshio Masuda
- 1958 Voice Without a Shadow (影なき声 Kagenaki koe) - d. Seijun Suzuki
- 1961 Quick Draw Joe - d. Takashi Nomura
- 1962 Mekishiko Mushuku
- 1963 Detective Bureau 2-3: Go to Hell Bastards! (探偵事務所23 銭と女に弱い男 Tantei jimusho 23: Kutabare akutōdomo) - d. by Seijun Suzuki
- 1963 Youth of the Beast (野獣の青春 Yaju no seishun) - d. Seijun Suzuki
- 1964 Cruel Gun Story - d. Takumi Furukawa
- 1964 Gate of Flesh (肉体の門 Nikutai no mon) - d. Seijun Suzuki
- 1965 Abare Kishidō (あばれ騎士道) (1965) - d.Isamu Kosugi
- 1967 A Colt Is My Passport (拳銃は俺のパスポート Koruto wa ore no pasupoto) - d. Takashi Nomura
- 1967 Massacre Gun (みな殺しの拳銃 Minagoroshi no kenjū) - d. Yasuharu Hasebe
- 1967 Branded to Kill (殺しの烙印 Koroshi no rakuin) - d. Seijun Suzuki
- 1968 Retaliation (縄張はもらった Shima wa moratta) - d. Yasuharu Hasebe
- 1969 The Wandering Guitarist - d.Buichi Saitō
- 1971 A Man's World - d. Yasuharu Hasebe
- 1974 Battles Without Honor and Humanity: Final Episode (仁義なき戦い 完結篇 Jingi naki tatakai: Chojo sakusen) - d. Kinji Fukasaku
- 1974 New Battles Without Honor and Humanity (新 仁義なき戦い Shin Jingi naki tatakai) - d. Kinji Fukasaku
- 1977 A Tale of Sorrow and Sadness (悲愁物語 Hishu monogatari) - d. Seijun Suzuki
- 1978 Bandits vs. Samurai Squadron (雲霧仁左衛門 Kumokiri nizaemon) - d. Hideo Gosha
- 1981 Edo Porn (北斎漫画 Hokusai manga) - d. Kaneto Shindō
- 1982 Tenkōsei
- 1985 Caribe: Symphony of Love (カリブ・愛のシンフォニー Karibu: Ai no shinfoni) - d. Norifumi Suzuki
- 1986 The Samurai (ザ・サムライ Za samurai - d. Norifumi Suzuki
- 1987 Fugitive Alien - d. Minoru Kanaya & Kiyosumi Kuzakawa
- 1988 Tokyo: The Last Megalopolis - d. Akio Jissoji
- 1994 The Most Terrible Time in My Life (我が人生最悪の時 Waga jinsei saiaku no toki) - d. Kaizo Hayashi
- 1995 The Stairway to the Distant Past (遥かな時代の階段を Harukana jidai no kaidan) o - d. Kaizo Hayashi
- 1996 The Trap (罠 Wana) - d. Kaizo Hayashi
- 1997 To Love (愛する Aisuru) - d. Kei Kumai
- 2007 Kisaragi

=== Television ===
- 1973 Kunitori Monogatari – Shibata Katsuie
- 1974 Katsu Kaishū
- 1973 Shinsho Taikōki (1973), Nakagawa Kiyohide
- 1976 Daitokai Tatakaino Hibi
- 1976 Kaze to Kumo to Niji to -
- 1978 Star Wolf - Captain Joe
- 1981 Pro Hunter - Yuzo Kikushima
- 1988 Takeda Shingen – Hara Toratane
- 1996 Hideyoshi – Honda Masanobu
- 2000 Aoi Tokugawa Sandai – Honda Tadakatsu
- 2001 The Kindaichi Case Files – Fujio Tashiro
- 2009 Tenchijin – Naoe Kagetsuna
