= Samurai Vendetta =

- Japanese movie poster
- Directed by: Kazuo Mori
- Written by: Daisuke Itō
- Based on: Hakuōki by Kosuke Gomi
- Produced by: Nobuo Miura
- Starring: Raizo Ichikawa; Shintaro Katsu; Chitose Maki; Ryosuke Kagawa
- Cinematography: Shozo Honda
- Edited by: Kōji Taniguchi
- Music by: Ichirō Saitō
- Distributed by: Daiei Film
- Release date: November 22, 1959 (Japan)
- Running time: 109 minutes
- Country: Japan
- Language: Japanese

Samurai Vendetta (Japanese: 薄桜記, Hepburn: Hakuōki) is a 1959 Japanese chanbara film directed by Kazuo Mori and starring Raizo Ichikawa and Shintaro Katsu, that was originally released by Daiei Film. It is a depiction of the early years of the samurai Horibe Yasubei, who was one of the forty-seven rōnin. The film is also known as Chronicle of Pale Cherry Blossoms, a poetic reference to the forty-seven rōnin.

== Plot ==
The film features Raizo Ichikawa as Tange Tanzen, and Shintaro Katsu as Yasubei Nakayama (later becoming Yasubei Horibe when he is adopted into another family), and opens with Yasubei simultaneously dueling several members of a rival dojo (school of swordsmanship). Yasubei deftly beats his opponents, but is expelled from his school as a result so as not to create enmity between the two schools. Tange, who is the best swordsmen of the defeated school, is expelled from the school because he was present at the duel but failed to intervene to help his fellow dojo-mates. He argued that he could not interfere because he was then on shogunate duties, but his colleagues accused him of cowardice and he was thereby expelled. After his expulsion, Tange comes across the maiden Chiharu, who was being attacked by feral dogs. Tange protects Chiharu (a member of the Uesugi Clan) and in the process kills one of the attacking "noble" dogs. However, the act carries with it the penalty of death due to the current Shogun's affinity for dogs. Yasubei helps to cover up Tange's act, but only as a way to become closer to Chiharu. It is because of his hidden affection for Chiharu that Yasubei considers aligning with the Uesugi clan (which is loyal to Chamberlain Kira who is later targeted for a revenge killing by the forty-seven rōnin).

When Yasubei disposes of the dead dog off a river bridge, he is approached by several members of the defeated school seeking revenge. Tange, feeling indebted to Yasubei for Yasubei's covering up Tange's killing of the feral dog, fights off Yasubei's would be assassins, who are also Tange's former dojo-mates. Through watching Tange, Yasubei ascertains that Tange may very well be his equal in sword fighting. Meanwhile, Chiharu and Tange become closer due to his rescue of her and their frequent meetings at shrine. Yasubei, who had decided to declare his love for Chiharu and was about to accept an offer to join her Uesugi family, changes his mind upon learning of Tange and Chiharu's engagement and instead joins the Asano clan.

On Hinamatsuri, Chiharu is seen showering affection on a doll that represents Tange, who is currently away in Kyoto. Chiharu is then kidnapped and raped by the same attackers seeking revenge against Tange for helping Yasubei. Tange learns of this, and as a result of the samurai code, the dynamic between his wife and him changes. He is within rights under the samurai code to kill her or to divorce her, but the latter would force Chiharu to commit seppuku. Chiharu feeling dishonored pleads that Tange kill her, but Tange ignores the request. He still loves her and wants to protect her, but under the samurai code, cannot remain her husband and cannot not show as much attention to her as before. Eventually, Tange hatches a scheme (the "fox" did it) that enables him to divorce Chiharu without forcing her to commit suicide. He resigns his post to become a rōnin and hunt down the five men who brought about his current circumstances. Despite Tange's attempts to remain respectful to Chiharu's family through everything, Chiharu's brother is infuriated with Tange and challenges to a duel. As penitence, Tange allows Chiharu's brother to cut off his right arm and says his right arm is the price he is paying for returning Chiharu to her family.

Tange disappears and everyone is wondering about his fate. He later appears after healing as a street performer, challenging anyone that would face the one armed swordsman, in the hopes that the men he sought would participate. His scheme is successful as one of the five kidnappers see him performing.

Yasubei, in the meanwhile, had joined the Asano clan and became engaged to the young 11-year-old daughter in the family, and changed his name to Horibe Yasubei. Meanwhile, Yasubei and his fellow rōnin are in the process of seeking revenge against Chamberlain Kira for his actions, resulting in the disbanding of the Asano clan. These story lines intersect when the five kidnappers are part of the group protecting Chamberlain Kira. The Asano clan has decided to attack Chamberlain Kira on the day of an upcoming tea ceremony, and in the process of planning, Yasubei once again comes across Chiharu and remembers that she is close to the tea master handling the upcoming tea ceremony. Chiharu, in the meantime, had left her brother (and her family) to become an independent woman.

Tange's chance for vengeance arrives when three of the kidnappers run into Tange on the streets. Tange is able to kill two of them but is shot in the leg by the third. Chiharu finds him in the street and takes him under her care. The remaining three men seeking to strike Tange while he is at his most vulnerable, challenge Tange to a "fair" duel, and recruits the other Kira guardmens to seek revenge against the one-armed, shot in the leg Tange. Tange is able to defend himself in what can be called Raizo Ichikawa's most definitive one-against-all scenes next to his performance in the film Betrayal. Chiharu comes upon the scene and is shot trying to run to Tange to help. Yasubei, who has been secretly following Chiharu to discover the date for the tea ceremony, also comes upon the scene and helps Tange, killing all the remaining attackers. However, Tange is fatally injured in the battle and Chiharu also dies from her gunshot wound. But before she dies, she tells Yasubei the date of the tea ceremony, showing her loyalty to her old friend and showing that she no longer had any ties or loyalty to her former Uesagi family, retainers of Chamberlain Kira.

The story closes with the final march of the forty-seven rōnin (including Yasubei) and their assault on Chamberlain Kira's home. One must assume that chances for the successful assault were improved when 15 to 20 of the Kira guardmens were killed earlier in their futile revenge attack on Tange.

== Cast ==
- Raizo Ichikawa as Tange Tenzen
- Shintaro Katsu as Yasubei Nakayama
- Chitose Maki as Chiharu
- Ryosuke Kagawa as Reiko Fujiwara

== Production ==
- Kazuo Mori - Director
- Kosuke Gomi - Author of original novel
- Daisuke Itō - Writer

== Film festivals ==
Samurai Vendetta has been part of a number of film festivals celebrating the Chambara genre, and also the careers of Raizo Ichikawa and Shintaro Katsu, within the last decade.

== Remake ==
Samurai Vendetta would be remade a short time later after Raizo Ichikawa's death, starring Hiroki Matsukata in the role previously portrayed by Ichikawa. The remake was called Broken Swords.
