= Broken Swords =

1969 film directed by Kazuo Ikehiro

- Film poster
- Directed by: Kazuo Ikehiro
- Written by: Daisuke Ito
- Starring: Hiroki Matsukata; Kojiro Hongo; Iwai Yumi; Shigeru Tsuyuguchi; Yoshi Katō
- Distributed by: Daiei Film
- Release date: May 31, 1969 (Japan)
- Running time: 90 minutes
- Country: Japan
- Language: Japanese

Broken Swords (Japanese: 秘剣破り, Hepburn: Hiken Yaburi) is a 1969 Japanese film directed by Kazuo Ikehiro. It is based on Kosuke Gomi's novel Hakuōki (薄桜記). The film depicts the early years of Horibe Yasubei and Tange Tenzen's relationship.

== Cast ==
- Hiroki Matsukata as Tange Tenzen
- Kojiro Hongo as Nakayama Yasubei
- Yumi Iwai as Nagao Chiharu
- Shigeru Tsuyuguchi as Nagao Ryunosuke
- Yoshihiko Aoyama as Asano Takumi no Kami
- Shousaku Sugiyama as Kira Yoshinaka
- Yoshi Katō as Horibe Yasubei
- Tatsuo Matsumura as Chisaka Takafusa

== Other adaptations ==
- Samurai Vendetta
