= Hitomi Nishina =

Japanese tarento and model (born 1984)

- 仁科 仁美
- Born: 1 November 1984 (age 41); Nishikyō-ku, Kyoto, Kyoto Prefecture, Japan
- Other names: Jinjin (仁仁)
- Occupations: Model; tarento
- Years active: 2002–present
- Style: Advertising; undergarment
- Height: 164 cm (5 ft 5 in)
- Awards: 14th Triumph Image Girl

Hitomi Nishina (仁科 仁美, Nishina Hitomi; born 1 November 1984, in Nishikyō-ku, Kyoto, Kyoto Prefecture) is a Japanese tarento and model.

Nishina was represented with Irving until she left on 31 December 2014. Her father was actor Hiroki Matsukata and her mother is actress Akiko Nishina, in which they are graduates for the entertainment industry. Nishina's parents were divorced in December 1998. After the divorce she grew up with her mother.

== Filmography ==
=== TV programmes ===
Year	Title	Network
2005	Ōsama no Brunch	TBS
2011	Sunday Japon	TBS

=== Internet ===
Year	Title
2011	Kaori to Hitomi no Now na Jijō!!

=== TV dramas ===
Year	Title	Role	Network
1994	Dai Chūshingura	Ōishi Kū	TBS
1994	Mei Bugyō: Tōyama no Kinsan	Ohikaru	TV Asahi
2004	On'yado Kawasemi		NHK
2005	Mito Kōmon		TBS
2005	One Missed Call	Reina Miwa	TV Asahi
2006	My Boss My Hero	Hitomi Sakurakouji	NTV
2011	Shin Keishichō Sōsaikka 9 Kakari	Ayaka Shiina	TV Asahi
2012	Keishichō Nanpei Han: Shichinin no Keiji	Erika Moriyama	TBS
2012	Kyoto Minami-sho Kanshiki File	Mari Takaoka	TV Asahi

=== Films ===
Year	Title
2008	Hikarisasu Umi, Boku no Fune

=== Stage ===
Year	Title	Role
2009	Shinjuku Eki –Koi no Carnival–	
2011	Dump Show!	Ayaka
2011	Nyōbō wa Yūrei	

=== Advertisements ===
Year	Title	Ref.
	Lotte "Kurumu"	
		Japan Energy
2010	Ad Council Japan "Taisetsu na anata e"	
