= Matsukata Hiroki no Super Trawling =

1995 video game

- Cover art
- Developer: Atelier Double
- Publisher: Tonkin House
- Platform: Super Famicom
- Release: JP: August 25, 1995
- Genre: Fishing
- Mode: Single-player

Matsukata Hiroki no Super Trawling (松方弘樹のスーパートローリング, The Matsukata Hiroki Supatororingu; "Hiroki Matsukata's Super Trawling") is a Japan-exclusive fishing video game for the Super Famicom.

== Gameplay ==
After catching a fish that is 340 kilograms, the player prepares to go after the other fish in the sea.

The player fishes with Hiroki Matsukata in exotic fishing venues around the world. These places include Australia, Mozambique and Cuba. A typical fish in the game weighs around 340 kilograms or 750 pounds, but the actual weight of the fish depends on the geographic location of the boat in addition to player skill.

Once a fish has been caught, the player must fight it in order to make a successful catch. Whoever gets their bar to the furthest edge of the screen first loses the fight; the fish becomes completely placid, while the angler loses his lure. The player is also accompanied by a female character who occasionally offers advice. Every map has a specific name for each of the areas which have been allocated for fishing. In later tournaments, the player must release fish that weigh less than 100 pounds or 45 kilograms.

Japanese text is featured in the game. Like in most fishing games, the player has a strict time limit. Different kinds of fishing lures are used in order to attract fish. The player must take their fishing vessel to different squares on a board to reach the fishing sequences. All measurements in the game use the metric system.
