= Takadanobaba =

Neighborhood in Shinjuku, Tokyo, Japan

Coordinates: 35°42′46″N 139°42′14″E

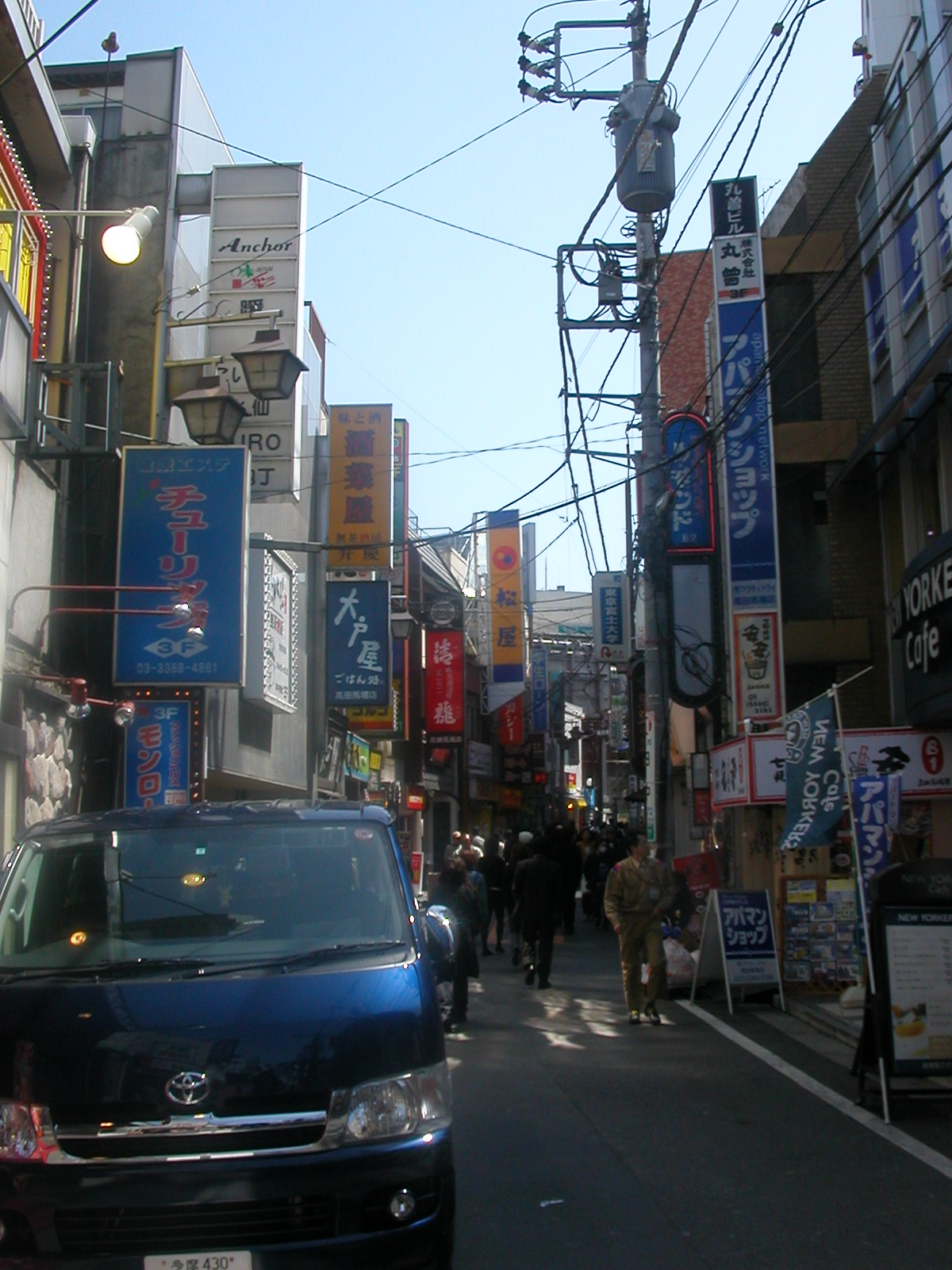
Street in Takadanobaba

Takadanobaba or Takatanobaba (Japanese: 高田馬場; Japanese pronunciation: [ta.ka.da no baꜜ.ba, -ka.ta-]) is a neighborhood in Shinjuku, Tokyo, Japan.

== History ==
Originally, the area's name was read Takatanobaba and many Tokyo residents in their 50s or older pronounce it as such. However, younger Tokyoites and residents from elsehwere use the pronunciation Takadanobaba. The area is also often referred to simply as "Baba".

The area was previously and officially known as Totsuka (戸塚). In 1636, the shōgun Tokugawa Iemitsu built in the area a baba (馬場), a ground for horseback riding and horse racing. Takata was the family name of the mother of Matsudaira Tadateru (the sixth son of Iemitsu's grandfather, the previous shogun Tokugawa Ieyasu) who favored the area as a sightseeing spot. The name stuck to prevent confusion with nearby Totsuka town near Yokohama (now Totsuka-ku, Yokohama).

In 1694, Nakayama Yasubei (later Horibe Yasubei, one of the forty-seven rōnin) took part in a battle (the Takadanobaba Kettō 高田馬場の決闘) there.

== Life in Takadanobaba ==
The neighborhood is a transport hub for commuters traveling in from the west of Tokyo as it is home to three popular train lines: the Seibu Shinjuku Line, the JR Yamanote Line, and the Tokyo Metro Tozai Line. During the morning rush hour, Takadanobaba is one of the hot-points of the Tokyo transport network with all three stations bursting at the seams with local residents, students and commuters.

Like neighboring Waseda, the area is synonymous with students (albeit with a somewhat less salubrious image). In addition to serving students commuting to Waseda University, the area is home to many educational institutions including vocational colleges and preparatory schools. Gakushuin University is nearby, one station stop away in Mejiro.

At night, once commuters have returned to suburbs and local residents are home, the area turns into a bit of a college town. The streets around the station become crowded with large groups of students staggering out of cheap bars and izakaya.

Architecturally, the area around the station is dominated by the monolithic and appropriately named Big Box building. The building houses a sports gym, an arcade, inexpensive clothing stores, a cafe, restaurants, a 100-yen shop, and a bookstore.

The Sendagaya Japanese School together with the New York–style Ben's Cafe (closed May 20, 2011), used English-language book shop The Blue Parrot, Mickey House made famous by the Lonely Planet's Tokyo/Japan guides and, on the way to Waseda, the English pub The Fiddler (which closed on January 31, 2007) have placed Takadanobaba on foreigners' maps of Tokyo.

Astro Boy, a fictional character created by Osamu Tezuka in 1952, was supposedly "born" in Takadanobaba on April 7, 2003. In commemoration to both this and the premiere of the 2003 Astro Boy television series, starting in 2003, the JR Yamanote Line platform uses the theme music from the TV series to signal the departure of a train. Also, many lamp posts in the area carry pictures from the TV series, and two large murals depicting Tezuka's works are across the street of JR Takadanobaba station.

Director J. J. Abrams referenced Takadanobaba as an influence on the naming of planet Takodana in the film, Star Wars: The Force Awakens.

== See also ==
- Takadanobaba Station
