= Cops vs. Thugs =

- Theatrical release poster
- Directed by: Kinji Fukasaku
- Written by: Kazuo Kasahara; Goro Kusakabe (original concept)
- Starring: Bunta Sugawara; Hiroki Matsukata
- Cinematography: Shigeru Akatsuka
- Music by: Toshiaki Tsushima
- Production company: Toei Company
- Distributed by: Toei
- Release date: April 26, 1975
- Running time: 100 minutes
- Country: Japan
- Language: Japanese

Cops vs. Thugs (県警対組織暴力, Kenkei tai Soshiki Bōryoku; lit. "Police vs. Violence Groups") is a 1975 Japanese yakuza film directed by Kinji Fukasaku. It won two Blue Ribbon Awards in 1976: Best Director (Fukasaku) and Best Actor (Sugawara). Complex named it number 6 on their list of The 25 Best Yakuza Movies. Kino International released the film on DVD in North America in 2006.

== Plot ==
In the year 1963, in the fictional city of Kurashima, two yakuza gangs, once sub gangs for a more powerful family, are competing for control of the city. They are the formerly Osaka-based Kawade family under Kasumi Kawade, and the Ohara family, under acting boss Kenji Hirotani, who killed the city's former gang boss. The Kawade are allied to ex-boss turned city councilman Masaichi Tomoyasu; the Ohara have an alliance with the local police force.

After Ohara men raid one of Tomoyasu's bars for a hostess who worked for Hirotani, Detective Tokomatsu Kuno passes information on an illegal land auction deal involving the Kawade, Tomoyasu, and the local oil company, Nikko Oil. Acting on this information, Hirotani leaks details of the deal. The land auction is put on hold, and Hirotani manages to gain control of it. He offers to sell it back to Nikko Oil executive Kubo for a price, but the latter refuses. Elsewhere, Ohara members and their police friends get into a fight with a truck driver, who is revealed to have been working for Kawade. Boss Kawade uses this as a pretext for an all-out gang war against Hirotani.

Kawade, Tomoyasu, and Kubo meet with Police Commissioner Kikkuchi. Kikkuchi has crusading Lieutenant Shoichi Kaida assigned to lead a new crackdown against the Ohara family. Kaida sets about ordering the officers - Kuno included - to stop fraternizing with the yakuza. Kaida makes his point by smashing bottles of sake Hirotani had sent to the station. Yoshihura, one of the officers under Tomoyasu's payroll, gets into a fight with Kaida, resigns, and joins Tomoyasu's law office. Because of this, Hirotani is angered with Kuno when he and his men are no longer being tipped off on upcoming police raids

Later, Boss Ohara is released from jail. After a raid at Ohara family headquarters, Boss Ohara is taken in for questioning, and under the advice of Tomoyasu, agrees to retire permanently, disband his family, and surrender all his rackets to Boss Kawade. Kuno meanwhile lets one of Hirotani's men (whom had met at the film's beginning), go free. The man is arrested later, but he believes Kuno had sold him out. Frustrated, Kuno gets into an argument with Kaida over how they should properly deal with the gangs. Kubo believes working with the gangs is better for the city than removing them. He gets suspended after picking a fight with Kaida.

Desperate to gain revenge against Kawade and Tomoyasu, Hirotani and his remaining men kidnap Yoshihura and hold him hostage. The police mobilize and attempt to besiege the hotel, but all attempts to convince Hirotani to surrender are unsuccessful. Kawamoto, a friend of Hirotani's right-hand man, Tsukahara, is killed after unsuccessfully asking Tsukahara to negotiate in Hirotani's place.

Kuno is then recalled to defuse the situation, and he manages to infiltrate the hotel, rescues Yoshihura, and subdues Hirotani after the hotel is tear-gassed. Kuno then arranges a deal with Kaida in exchange for Hirotani: the Kawade family will be disbanded, Hirotani and Tsukahara will be given light prison sentences, and Kaida will admit that Kuno was correct about how to deal with the gangs. If Kaida refuses, Kuno will leave and expose the corrupt officers in the police force, himself included.

Kaida accepts the deal, and Hirotani has his men surrender themselves and their weapons. As they give themselves up, Hirotani asks Kuno to remove his cuffs, and he obliges as a final favor. After he is led out, Hirotani and Tsukahara break free and attempt to take Kaida hostage. After a tense standoff, Kuno pulls out his pistol and fatally shoots Hirotani.

An epilogue states that Kaida resigned from the force two years later and took up a midlevel position with Nikko Oil. Kuno meanwhile, had been transferred to another city and demoted to a patrolman. One night, he is followed by a truck. Kuno comes upon a crashed car and signals the truck to slow down, but the truck runs him over and kills Kuno.

== Cast ==
- Bunta Sugawara as Tokumatsu Kuno
- Hiroki Matsukata as Kenji Hirotani
- Mikio Narita as Katsumi Kawade
- Tatsuo Umemiya as Shoichi Kaida
- Hideo Murota as Tsukahara
- Shingo Yamashiro as Yasuo Kawamoto
- Reiko Ike as Mariko
- Jūkei Fujioka as Ikeda
- Asao Sano as Yusaku Yoshiura
- Nobuo Kaneko as Masaichi Tomoyasu
- Harumi Sone as Kyuichi Okimoto
- Takuzo Kawatani as Taku Matsui
- Tatsuo Endō as Takeo Ohara
- Kunie Tanaka as Kinpachi Komiya
- Toru Abe as Azuma Kikuchi
- Akira Shioji as Chujiro Shiota
- Shotaro Hayashi as Shimodera
- Masaharu Arikawa as Tokuda
- Sanae Nakahara as Reiko
- Yoko Koizumi as Yuri
- Maki Tachibana as Kasumi
- Keiko Yumi as Miya
- Midori Shirai as Chiyomi
- Masako Matsumoto as Mitsuyo
- Gentaro Mori as Tanpo

== Production ==
Tetsuya Watari was originally set to play Hirotani, but had to step down due to illness. The role then went to Hiroki Matsukata.
