= Itsuka dokusho suruhi =

- DVD cover
- Directed by: Akira Ogata
- Written by: Kenji Aoki
- Produced by: Shiro Oiwake; Motohiro Hatanaka
- Starring: Yūko Tanaka; Ittoku Kishibe; Akiko Nishina
- Cinematography: Norimichi Kasamatsu
- Edited by: Yōsuke Yafune
- Music by: Shin'ichirō Ikebe
- Production companies: Amuse Soft Entertainment; Paradise Cafe; Pug Point Japan
- Release date: July 2, 2005 (Japan)
- Running time: 127 minutes
- Country: Japan
- Language: Japanese

Itsuka dokusho suruhi (Japanese: いつか読書する日), known in English as The Milkwoman, is a 2005 Japanese drama film directed by Akira Ogata. It was listed as the 2nd best film at the 27th Yokohama Film Festival.

== Cast ==
- Yūko Tanaka as Minako Oba
- Ittoku Kishibe as Kaita Takanashi
- Akiko Nishina as Yoko Takanashi

== Awards ==
27th Yokohama Film Festival

- Best Screenplay
- Best Actress - Yūko Tanaka
- Best Supporting Actor - Ittoku Kishibe
- 2nd Best Film
