= 27th Yokohama Film Festival =

2006 film festival in Yokohama, Japan

Coordinates: 35°26′51.81″N 139°38′8.98″E

- Location: Kannai Hall, Yokohama, Kanagawa, Japan
- Founded: 1980
- Festival date: 5 February 2006

The 27th Yokohama Film Festival (第27回ヨコハマ映画祭) took place in February 5, 2006. It was held at Kannai Hall in Yokohama, Kanagawa Prefecture, Japan.

== Awards ==
- Best Film: Break Through!
- Best Actor: Joe Odagiri – House of Himiko, Scrap Heaven, Princess Raccoon, Shinobi: Heart Under Blade
- Best Actress: Yūko Tanaka – Itsuka dokusho suruhi, Hibi
- Best Supporting Actor: Ittoku Kishibe – Itsuka dokusho suruhi, Hibi, Aegis, Vital
- Best Supporting Actress: Hiroko Yakushimaru – Always Sanchōme no Yūhi, Princess Raccoon, Lakeside Murder Case, Tetsujin 28-go
- Best Director: Kazuyuki Izutsu – Break Through!
- Best New Director: Kenji Uchida – A Stranger of Mine
- Best Screenplay: Kenji Aoki – Itsuka dokusho suruhi
- Best Cinematography: Hideo Yamamoto – Break Through!, The Great Yokai War, Tetsujin 28-go
- Best New Talent:
  - Maki Horikita – Always Sanchōme no Yūhi, The All-Out Nine: Field of Nightmares, Hinokio, Shinku
  - Erika Sawajiri – Break Through!, Ashura, Shinobi: Heart Under Blade
  - Shun Shioya – Break Through!
- Best Technical: Takashi Yamazaki – Always Sanchōme no Yūhi – For the VFX.
- Special Jury Prize: Kenji Uchida – A Stranger of Mine

== Best 10 ==
1. Break Through!
2. Itsuka dokusho suruhi
3. Always Sanchōme no Yūhi
4. A Stranger of Mine
5. Linda Linda Linda
6. Nana
7. Hibi
8. Hanging Garden
9. House of Himiko
10. Sayonara Midori-chan

runner-up: Ki no Umi
