= Hokuriku Proxy War =

1977 Japanese yakuza film

- Theatrical release poster
- Directed by: Kinji Fukasaku
- Written by: Koji Takada
- Produced by: Goro Kusakabe; Keiichi Hashimoto; Kyo Namura
- Starring: Hiroki Matsukata; Sonny Chiba; Yumiko Nogawa
- Narrated by: Satoshi Sakai
- Cinematography: Toru Nakajima
- Edited by: Kozo Horiike
- Music by: Toshiaki Tsushima
- Distributed by: Toei Company
- Release date: February 26, 1977
- Running time: 98 minutes
- Country: Japan
- Language: Japanese

Hokuriku Proxy War (Japanese: 北陸代理戦争, Hepburn: Hokuriku Dairi Sensō) is a 1977 Japanese yakuza film directed by Kinji Fukasaku and starring Hiroki Matsukata, Sonny Chiba and Yumiko Nogawa. A jitsuroku eiga based on real events, it depicts a conflict between a wild yakuza (Matsukata) and his bosses that spreads across the Hokuriku region of Japan.

It was released by Toei Company on February 26, 1977. Less than two months later, the real-life basis for Matsukata's character, Hiroshi Kawauchi, was shot dead in a manner nearly identical to a scene in the film. This is believed to be the reason why Hokuriku Proxy War was Fukasaku's last yakuza film and Toei's last jitsuroku eiga.

== Plot ==
In 1968, Noboru Kawata (Note: Radiance Films uses "Kawata" in the subtitles of their English release, but "Kawada" in its packaging and booklet.), a peasant from Mikuni, is a yakuza of the Tomiyasu Group in Fukui who has recently been released from jail. With his boss Yasuura refusing to make good on the promise to give Kawata control over the family's speedboat racetrack in exchange for committing a murder five years earlier, Kawata buries him up to his neck and forces him to relinquish control by driving a jeep near his head. Yasuura then goes to Tsuruga to ask for help from the Kanai Group, a destructive yakuza organization based in Osaka working under the umbrella of the large Asada Group. Their leader, Hachiro Kanai, sends an excessive amount of assassins to kill Kawata, and Mantani warns Yasuura that this is part of Kanai's plan to invade the Hokuriku region. Kawata hides out in the Shiranami House with his lover Kiku Nakai, who works there. Yoshitane from Kyoto acts as a mediator and arranges a meeting between Kawata and Kubo, who has been sent by Okano of the Asada Group to offer support in any battles against Kanai as he often causes trouble for the Asada, but Kawata is unreceptive.

When Kawata goes to the cafe Taiyo to have a meeting with Yasuura, he is attacked and seriously injured before the police arrive and stop the fight. Yasuura appoints Mantani as underboss of the Tomiyasu Group and tells him to take care of Kawata. Mantani is Kanai's sworn brother, so Kawata sees this as another means by which Osaka seeks to control Fukui. Kiku's younger sister Nobuko and brother Takashi, a yakuza of the Yanaka Group in Kanazawa, take Kawata to their hometown of Wajima to recover. Takashi's boss Oya fears that the Kanai Group will invade if they learn of this, so he tells Takashi to move Kawata to a different location. When Mantani learns Kawata's location, Kiku agrees to be his woman if he will keep it a secret. Meanwhile, Kawata begins a relationship with Kiku's sister Nobuko. Kawata attacks the Tomiyasu Group and buries a member up to his neck until he reveals that Mantani is currently at a gambling house in Kyoto run by the Yoshitane Group. Kawata sneaks in and cuts off Mantani's hand, then kills a member of the Kanai Group who mocks him.

While serving time in Hamamatsu Prison for the murder, Kawata is stabbed by a Kanai Group member but is saved by Takei of the Yanaka Group, who tells him that his boss Oya has been killed and that Takashi has become head of the Kanai branch office. When Kawata is about to be released in 1973, he tells Kiku he will be leaving the yakuza life and asks her to seek help from Okano. Meanwhile, Takashi's superiors tell him that he will be given control of Mikuni if he kills Kawata. Kawata returns to his old office, where he finds Nobuko waiting for him. He then finds Mantani and apologizes to him, but Mantani beats him with his cane before Kawata confesses to Kiku that he and Nobuko are getting married.

Kwada meets with Okano, who agrees to secretly assist him in taking out Kanai so Kawata can take back Fukui. Kawata and Takei rob the safe at one of the offices of the Kanai Group, then begin murdering its members. They forcefully convince Chairman Ryugasaki in Nagoya to lend them some powerful machine guns, while Mantani's men call for reinforcements from Osaka. Yasuura goes to Kawata and asks for his assistance it taking down Mantani, who has become a puppet of the Kanai Group, while Kubo calls the police to raid the Kanai Group's office in Osaka, where they arrest Kanai for illegal weapons possession. Kawata and Okano then officially swear loyalty to each other and become bonded brothers. Mantani tells Takashi that he will take him into the Asada Group if he kills Kawata, so he beats his sister Nobuko and holds her hostage to lure Kawata out. When Kawata and his men arrive and rescue Nobuko, she grabs a knife and kills Takashi, then turns herself in to the police.

With Mantani now appearing to be on the losing end, Kiku leaves him for Okano, while Kawata and Yasuura form an alliance with Mantani against Okano. Takei pays some old members of the Kanai Group to destroy the bar where Kiku now works, and Okano and Kiku assume that Mantani was somehow involved. They and Kawata confront Mantani in the hospital where he is recovering from a heart attack. Fed up with Kawata's scheming, Mantani agrees to give control of Fukui to him. Kawata brings Okano and Kiku to a field where he has buried the Kanai Group members who destroyed the club up to their necks, then has one of his men drive over their heads to kill them. When Kawata tells him a sworn bond means nothing to a Hokuriku wolf, Okano leaves in a car and Kiku walks away in the snow.

== Cast ==
- Hiroki Matsukata as Noboru Kawata
- Sonny Chiba as Kanai
- Yumiko Nogawa as Kiku
- Yoko Takahashi as Nobuko
- Hajime Hana as Mantani
- Kō Nishimura as Yasuura
- Takeo Chii as Takashi Nakai
- Goro Ibuki as Takei
- Tatsuo Endo as Okano
- Mikio Narita as Kubo
- Junkichi Orimoto as Yanaka
- Jirō Yabuki as Hanamaki
- Nenji Kobayashi
- Seizo Fukumoto
- Sanae Nakahara as Yasuura's wife

== Production ==
Hokuriku Proxy War began as an installment in Fukasaku's New Battles Without Honor and Humanity series, before lead actor Bunta Sugawara withdrew from the project. Looking back decades later, screenwriter Koji Takada said he believed Fukasaku wanted to pack in everything he had left undone in the Battles series and to have a hero stand in the harsh climate of the Hokuriku region, and called it his favorite film by the director. Takada based its main character Noboru Kawata on Hiroshi Kawauchi, boss of the Kawauchi-gumi. Takada interviewed the yakuza, who was very open, telling him various stories without hiding anything. According to film historian Akihito Ito, Hiroki Matsukata always met the people his roles were based on and incorporated some of Kawauchi's habits in his performance, such as his swaying from side to side. Ito said that "Hoshikage no Waltz", which appears in the film, was Kawauchi's favorite song.

Yoko Takahashi received the offer for Hokuriku Proxy War while filming Kon Ichikawa's Rhyme of Vengeance, and her agency arranged her schedule so she could appear in both, as they really wanted her to be in what turned out to be her first Toei film. Her role was originally written as a male, but this was changed so that Yumiko Nogawa was not the only female character. Takada told Takahashi that, because they had no time to hold auditions, Fukasaku randomly chose her out of an actor directory book based on her photo, and had probably never seen her work before. On Takahashi's first day on location in Fukui, Tsunehiko Watase was rushed to the hospital after breaking his ankle while shooting the film's opening scene where Kō Nishimura is buried in the snow. Watase's role was recast to Goro Ibuki, and any scenes with him were re-shot. Although, Watase still appears in the trailer.

The act of burying people alive in the snow is an act of lynching taken directly from stories Kawauchi told Takada, and which the screenwriter later confirmed to have actually been used by yakuza. Takahashi explained that the film crew recreated these by digging holes, placing barrels and a small heater in them, and then placing a board on top of the actor in the barrel which was then covered with snow.

Reportedly, the Fukui Prefectural Police persistently requested that the film be canceled while supervising the shooting. Due to delays, Sadao Nakajima was called in to help as director of Unit B. Filming wrapped four days before the release date, and the entire film was finished the day before it.

== Release and aftermath ==
Hokuriku Proxy War was released on February 26, 1977. It was not released in Fukui Prefecture, due to a request from the prefectural police. According to Ito, the film failed to attract an audience due to a theme of gloom and hopelessness. A month and a half later, Kawauchi was killed in an attack strikingly similar to a scene from the movie. The assassination, dubbed the "Mikuni Incident" (三国事件, Mikuni Jiken), took place in Mikuni on April 13 at a kissaten named Hawaii, which is where Takada had interviewed Kawauchi. The exterior of Hawaii appears in the film under the name "Taiyo", but the interior seen is a studio set modeled after the real one. Kawauchi, who was expelled by his boss Masao Sugatani, second-in-command of the Yamaguchi-gumi, when filming of Hokuriku Proxy War began, was shot dead by four of Sugatani's men while sitting in Hawaii. In the film, multiple men shoot at Kawata as he is sitting in the cafe. Both the police and the media blamed the film for the assassination, causing a public uproar. The incident is believed to be the reason Fukasaku stopped directing yakuza films, and the reason Toei moved away from jitsuroku eiga, or yakuza films based on real events. Takada admitted to underestimating the precarious position Kawauchi was in at the time and said he felt one of the reasons Kawauchi was killed was because he had helped make the film, but said he still would have written the film even if he had known it was dangerous.

When Laputa Asagaya, a 48-seat theater in Tokyo specializing in old Japanese films, contacted Toei for a copy of Hokuriku Proxy War to screen at a 2014 retrospective on Takada, they were told the studio had no copies. Although the National Film Archive of Japan had one, Laputa's plans surpassed the Archive's limit of three screenings, so the theater paid around 300,000 yen for a new print to be made.

Hokuriku Proxy War was released on Blu-ray by Radiance Films in the United Kingdom on February 24, 2025, and in North America a day later.

== Reception ==
A.W. Kautzer of The Movie Isle called Hokuriku Proxy War a "truly riveting piece of blood-soaked violence" that "speaks more to class and the rage of the underprivileged than any yakuza film before it." In his book Spinegrinder: The Movies Most Critics Won't Wrote About, Clive Davies called the film "an absolutely first-class yakuza gangster war thriller that benefits from having the story located in the coastal town of Hokuriku."

In his book Outlaw Masters of Japanese Film, author Chris Desjardins writes that the film is "another jitsuroku yakuza blitzkrieg, this time set in a snowy Hokuriku coastal town where a murderously independent yakuza boss (Hiroki Matsukata) is bent on gaining tighter control of the territory. Sonny Chiba is slickly venal as an oily, smooth-talking gangster and Ko Nishimura convincing as always, as an elder boss obstinately sticking to his guns. The splendid Yumiko Nogawa unfortunately doesn't have much to do. Filmed on actual Hokuriku locations, the stormy winter atmosphere is savage and palpably chilling, giving the cold-blooded brutality on display a teeth-chattering edge." Jun Naito, editor-in-chief of the non-fiction book review site HONZ, cited Hokuriku Proxy War as the prototype for the strong female roles in yakuza films that were to come in the 1980s, such as Onimasa and Yakuza Wives.

Writing for SKY PerfecTV!, Ken Harada said that Hokuriku Proxy War shows Fukasaku at the height of his powers, with sheer intensity radiating from the work and its breathless roller-coaster pace, and strongly praised Matsukata's performance for matching the director. Jake Cole of Slant Magazine opined that Sonny Chiba "steals the show" as an outlandishly dressed yakuza boss whose every move speaks to his character's obsessive need to wield power and whose machinations spur the free-for-all that comes.
