= Akiko Nishina =

Japanese actress (born 1953)

This page must adhere to the biographies of living persons (BLP) policy, even if it is not a biography, because it contains material about living persons. Contentious material about living persons that is unsourced or poorly sourced must be removed immediately from the page and its talk page, especially if potentially libellous. If such material is repeatedly inserted, or if you have other concerns, please report the issue to this noticeboard. If you are a subject of this page, or acting on behalf of one, and you need help, please see this help page.

Akiko Nishina (仁科亜希子) (born 3 April 1953) is a Japanese actress. Once 仁科明子, her name is now 仁科亜季子.

Nishina was born in Tokyo, the daughter of kabuki actor Hanshiro Iwai. She was married to actor Hiroki Matsukata, from 1979 until their divorce in 1998; they had two daughters.

== Career ==
=== Film ===
- Hatsukoi (First Love, 1975)
- Between Women and Wives (1976)
- The Devil's Ballad (1977)
- Itsuka dokusho suruhi (2005)

=== Television ===
- Katsu Kaishū (1974)
- Daitokai Series (Part 1 and 2) (1976-1979)
- Part-Time Detective 2 (2004) as Saeko Okazono
