= Hiroki Matsukata =

Japanese actor (1942–2017)

- Matsukata in November 1973
- Born: Kōju Meguro; July 23, 1942; Kita-ku, Tokyo, Japan
- Died: January 21, 2017 (aged 74)
- Occupation: Actor
- Years active: 1960–2016
- Spouse: Akiko Nishina (m. 1979; div. 1998)
- Children: Masaki Nishina; Hitomi Nishina
- Father: Jūshirō Konoe
- Relatives: Yūki Meguro (brother)

Kōju Meguro (Japanese: 目黒 浩樹, Hepburn: Meguro Kōju; July 23, 1942 – January 21, 2017), better known by his stage name Hiroki Matsukata (松方 弘樹, Matsukata Hiroki), was a Japanese actor. He was the son of jidaigeki actor Jūshirō Konoe and actress Yaeko Mizukawa and has a younger brother, Yūki Meguro, who is also an actor. With ex-wife actress Akiko Nishina he had two children; son Masaki Nishina and daughter Hitomi Nishina are both in the entertainment industry.

== Career ==
As a young man, he aspired to be a singer, but turned to acting, making his debut while still in high school. His first film was 1960's Jūnanasai no Gyakushū: Bōryoku o Buttsubuse (十七歳の逆襲・暴力をぶっ潰せ) for Tōei, where his father worked. He specialized in romantic leads in jidaigeki and yakuza films. But he soon switched to modern yakuza for films such as Bakuto (1964) and Showa Zankyoden (1965), and starred in Kinji Fukasaku's Blackmail Is My Life (1968).

In 1969 he switched to Daiei as a replacement for the recently deceased Raizo Ichikawa, starring in nine films including two in the Nemuri Kyōshirō series and Mission: Iron Castle, the final entry in the Shinobi no Mono series. After returning to Tōei he would appear in many more films by Fukasaku in the following decade, including three installments in the Battles Without Honor and Humanity series, Cops vs. Thugs (1975), Hokuriku Proxy War (1977), Doberman Cop (1977), Shogun's Samurai (1978) and The Fall of Ako Castle (1978). Starring opposite Bunta Sugawara in the first four and opposite Sonny Chiba in the last four.

He starred in both the original 1984 Shura no Mure and the 2002 remake. In addition, he has appeared in numerous V-Cinema titles, including what was advertised as Toei's "last yakuza movie", The Man Who Shot the Don (1994). In the 1990s he was a regular on Takeshi Kitano's Genki Ga Deru TV comedy show.

His television credits include Ōedo Sōsamō (1979 to 1984), the title role in Meibugyō Tōyama no Kin-san (1988–1998), the lead character Yaguchi Mansaku in Hadaka no Deka, and one of the central characters in Hotel. He played Ōishi Kuranosuke in the 1994 TBS Daichūshingura. Matsukata also appeared as a guest voice actor in the NHK anime series Agatha Christie's Great Detectives Poirot and Marple.

Matsukata was hospitalized for a possible brain tumor on February 23, 2016. He subsequently cancelled several entertainment appearances. On March 2, it was announced that Matsukata had been diagnosed with brain lymphoma. On January 21, 2017, Hiroki Matsukata died due to complications from his lymphoma at 11:26 a.m., at the age of 74.

== Selected filmography ==
=== Film ===
- Jūnanasai no Gyakushū: Bōryoku o Buttsubuse (1960)
- Akō Rōshi (1961) - Ōishi Chikara
- The Magic Serpent (1966) - Ikazuchi-Maru
- Blackmail Is My Life (1968) - Shun
- Broken Swords (1969) - Tange Tenzen
- Nemuri Kyōshirō Manji Giri (1969) - Nemuri Kyōshirō
- Battles Without Honor and Humanity (1973) - Tetsuya Sakai
- Battles Without Honor and Humanity: Police Tactics (1974) - Shoichi Fujita
- Battles Without Honor and Humanity: Final Episode (1974) - Terukichi Ichioka
- The Rapacious Jailbreaker (1974) - Masayuki Ueda
- New Battles Without Honor and Humanity (1974)
- Cops vs. Thugs (1975) - Kenji Hirotani
- Gambling Den Heist (1975)
- Hokuriku Proxy War (1977)
- Doberman Cop (1977) - Kaiji Hidemori
- Shogun's Samurai (1978) - Tokugawa Iemitsu
- The Fall of Ako Castle (1978) - Denhachiro Tamon
- Sanada Yukimura no Bōryaku (1979) - Sanada Yukimura
- Nichiren (1979) - Hōjō Tokimune
- Theater of Life (1983) - Hishakaku
- Shogun's Shadow (1989)
- The Yagyu Code: Secret Scroll (1990)
- The Yagyu Code 2: Fifty Blades (1990)
- The Yagyu Code 3: Conspiracy in Kyoto (1991)
- The Yagyu Code 4: A Duel of Conviction (1991)
- Edo Jō Tairan (1991)
- The Man Who Shot the Don (1994) - Horai
- Agitator (2001)
- Thirteen Assassins (2010) - Kuranaga Saheita
- Koitanibashi (2011)
- Ninja Kids!!! (2011) - Happōsai Hieta
- Gal Basara: Sengoku Jidai wa Kengai Desu (2011) - Oda Nobunaga
- Unsung Hero (2014) - Himself

=== Television ===
- Katsu Kaishū (1974) - Katsu Kaishū
- Akō Rōshi (1979) - Tsuchiya Chikara
- Ōoku (1983)
- Meibugyō Tōyama no Kin-san (1988–98) - Kin-san
- Tokugawa Fūunroku Hachidai Shōgun Yoshimune (2008) - Tokugawa Mitsusada
- Tenchijin (2009) - Tokugawa Ieyasu
- Yae's Sakura (2013)

=== Video games ===
- Matsukata Hiroki no Super Trawling (Himself) (Super Famicom) (1995)
- Matsukata Hiroki no World Fishing (Himself) (PlayStation, Sega Saturn) (1996)
- Ryū ga Gotoku Kenzan! (柳生 石舟斎 Yagyū Sekishūsai) (PlayStation 3) (2008)
