= Kosuke Gomi =

Japanese novelist (1921–1980)

Gomi Kōsuke
- 五味 康祐
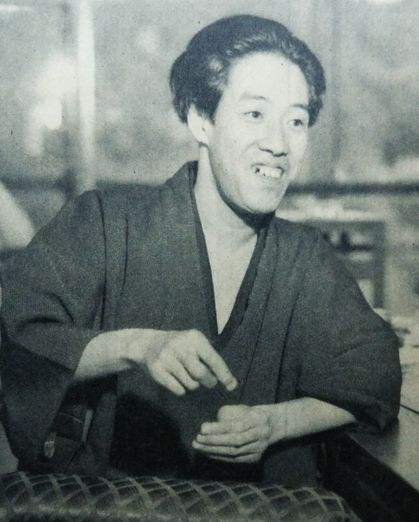
- Gomi in 1955
- Born: 20 December 1921; Osaka, Japan
- Died: 1 April 1980 (aged 58)
- Occupation: writer
- Writing career
- Genres: historical novels, popular fiction

Yasusuke Gomi (20 December 1921 – 1 April 1980), known by his pen name Kosuke Gomi (五味 康祐, Gomi Kōsuke), was a Japanese novelist active during the Shōwa period of Japan. He is primarily known for his popular fiction on historical themes.

== Life and career ==
Gomi was born in the Namba neighborhood of Osaka. His parents died when he was still a small child, and he was raised by his grandparents, who had a thriving business running local theaters and cinemas. He dropped out of a preparatory school for Waseda University, but when faced with danger of conscription in 1942, quickly enrolled into the Literature Department of Meiji University. However, in 1943, all university students were conscripted into the Imperial Japanese Army and Gomi was sent to the China front, and was based at Nanjing until the end of the war. During World War II, he met author Yasuda Yojuro, who encouraged him to pursue his interest in history and historical fiction with a career as a writer.

After the end of the war, Gomi completed his education at Meiji University, and began writing popular fiction with swordsmen of the Edo period as his protagonists. In particular, he wrote many stories using the historical Yagyū Jūbei Mitsuyoshi as his hero. He also created a character named Aoi Shingo, a fictional illegitimate son of shōgun Tokugawa Yoshimune, who travels around Japan in disguise, righting wrongs done by the government.

Gomi lived in Mitaka, Tokyo from 1947, where famed sumo wrestler Minanogawa Tōzō was a neighbor. He moved to Kobe in 1950, where he was subsequently hospitalized for an overdose of illegal stimulants. He returned to Tokyo in 1952. Gomi won the 28th Akutagawa Prize in 1953.

His novel, Yagyu Bugeicho (The Secret Scrolls), was made into a movie Yagyu Secret Scrolls starring Toshirō Mifune in 1958.

In addition to his career as a writer, Gomi was also a noted music critic of classical music, and also a reviewer and critic of audio equipment. He was a man of wide-ranging hobbies, from mahjong to palmistry, and he left numerous monographs of his hobbies as well.

A car buff, Gomi was arrested for drunken driving in May 1961. On January 31, 1964, he was involved in a head-on collision with a truck while driving on Japan National Route 1 at Suzuka, Mie, which left him hospitalized with internal injuries. On July 24, 1965, while speeding through Nagoya, he ran over and killed a 60-year-old woman and her 6-year-old grandchild. He was given a light sentence (18 months in prison, five years probation) partly due to a petition signed by numerous authors including Kawabata Yasunari, Shiga Naoya and Mishima Yukio.

Gomi died of lung cancer in 1980 at the age of 58. His grave is at the temple of Kenchō-ji in Kamakura, Kanagawa.

== See also ==
- Japanese literature
- List of Japanese authors
