= Horibe Yasubee =

Samurai (1670–1703)

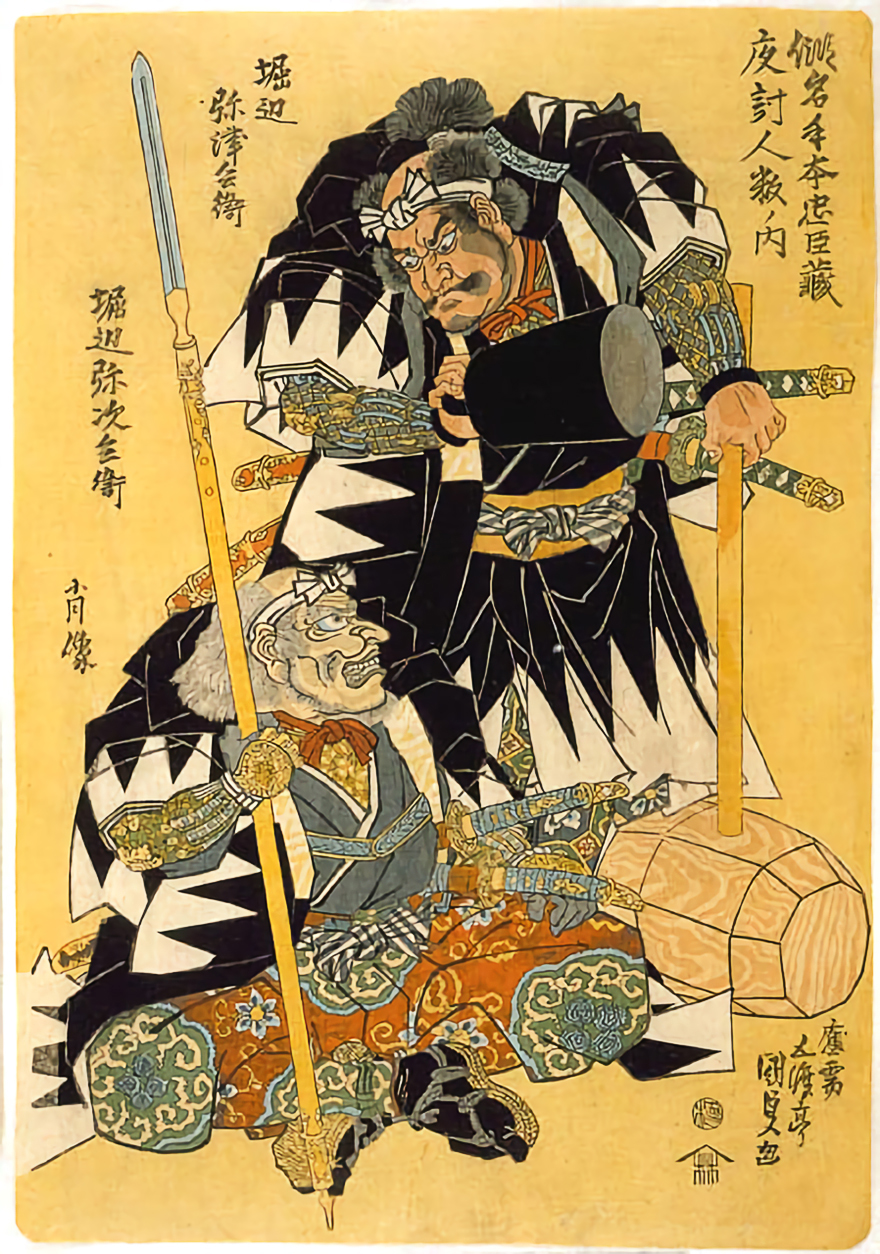
Horibe Yahei and his adopted son Horibe Yasubee in black-and-white patterned firefighter's disguises and bearing a pike and a wooden sledgehammer by Utagawa Kunisada

Horibe Yasubee Taketsune (堀部 安兵衛 武庸; 1670–March 20, 1703) was a warrior in Japan. Yasubee was born to Nakayama Yajiemon (中山 弥次右衛門), a samurai of the Shibata Domain (a han in present-day Niigata Prefecture) . When Yasubee was 13, his father lost his position and became a rōnin. Soon afterwards, Yajiemon died, and as Yasubee's mother had died shortly after giving birth to him, Yasubee was thus orphaned. Eventually, Yasubee ended up in Edo and became successful as a master swordsman at the dōjō.

In 1694, Yasubee came to the aid of his dōjō mate and pledged uncle in a duel at Takadanobaba in Edo, killing three opponents. He received acclaim for his role, and Horibe Yahei of the Akō Domain asked Yasubee to marry his daughter and become the heir to Yahei's family. Yahei was so impressed with Yasubee that he pleaded to his liege, Asano Naganori, to allow Yasubee to keep his Nakayama surname while marrying into the Horibe family. Yasubee eventually took on the Horibe surname and became a successful retainer of the Akō Domain.

In 1701, Asano Naganori was sentenced to commit seppuku as a result of an attack on Kira Yoshinaka. The Akō Domain was disbanded, and Yasubee once again became a rōnin. In 1702, Yasubee and Yahei were among the Forty-seven Rōnin who attacked and killed Kira, avenging their late lord's death. Yasubee surrendered to the authorities and was placed in the custody of Matsudaira Oki no Kami Sadanao. On March 20, 1703 (according to the Gregorian calendar), he was sentenced to commit seppuku.

Horibe Yasubee has a prominent role in plays, films, and television depictions of Chūshingura, the fictionalized account of the Forty-seven Rōnin.
