= New Shuttle =

People mover in Japan

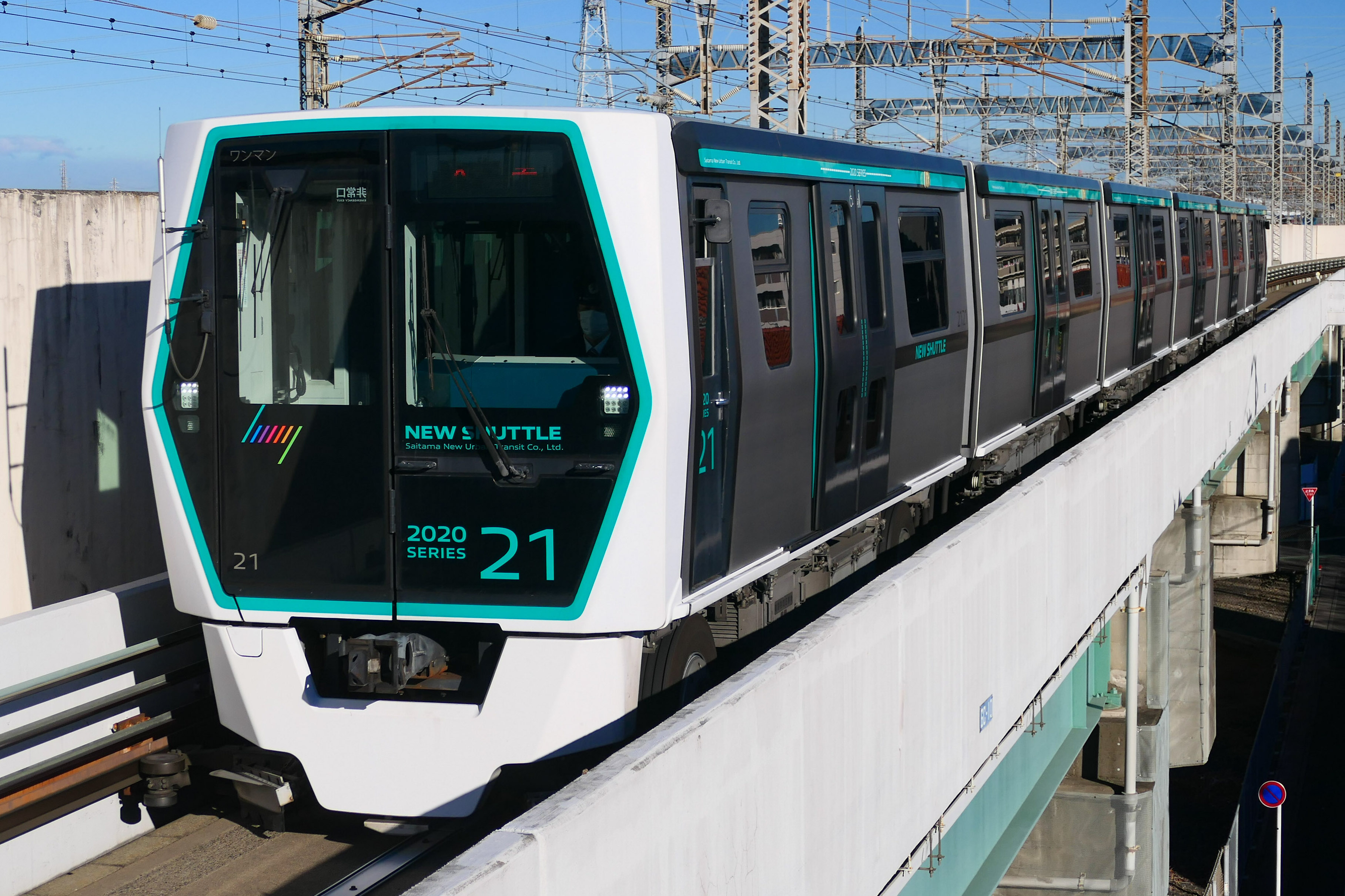
- 2020 series set 21 enters Kamonomiya Station in December 2024

Overview
- Other name: Ina Line (伊奈線)
- Native name: ニューシャトル
- Locale: Saitama Prefecture
- Termini: Ōmiya; Uchijuku
- Stations: 13
- Website: https://www.new-shuttle.jp/

Service
- Type: Rubber-tyred people mover
- Operator(s): Saitama New Urban Transit Co., Ltd.
- Depot: Maruyama
- Rolling stock: 2000 series; 2020 series

History
- Opened: 22 December 1983; 42 years ago
- Completed: 2 August 1990; 36 years ago

Technical
- Line length: 12.7 km (7.9 mi)
- Number of tracks: Ōmiya – Maruyama: 2; Maruyama – Uchijuku: 1
- Minimum radius: 25 m (82 ft)
- Electrification: Conductor rails, 600 V 50 Hz 3φ AC
- Operating speed: 60 km/h (37 mph)

The New Shuttle (Japanese: ニューシャトル, Hepburn: Nyū Shatoru) is a manually operated, rubber-tyred people mover system in Saitama Prefecture, Japan.

The system's only route is the 12.7-kilometre (7.9 mi) Ina Line (伊奈線, Ina-sen), which runs north from Ōmiya Station in Saitama to Uchijuku Station in Ina. The line was built as part of an agreement to address local opposition to the construction of elevated viaducts for the Shinkansen through the area. The New Shuttle runs alongside the Shinkansen for most of its route.

Between Ōmiya and Maruyama, the line is double-tracked and runs alongside the viaduct shared by the Tōhoku Shinkansen and Jōetsu Shinkansen. Between Maruyama and Uchijuku, it continues alongside the Jōetsu Shinkansen on a single track. The New Shuttle's depot is located within the Y-shaped junction formed by the Tōhoku and Jōetsu Shinkansen lines at Maruyama.

It is operated by the third-sector railway company Saitama New Urban Transit Co., Ltd. (埼玉新都市交通株式会社, Saitama Shin Toshi Kōtsū Kabushiki-gaisha), whose shareholders include East Japan Railway Company (40%), the Saitama prefectural government (35%), various banks (15% collectively), Tobu Railway (5%), and the municipalities served by the line (5% collectively).

== Stations ==
The stations on the line are as follows. All stations are located in Saitama Prefecture.

Colour/No.	Name	Distance in km (mi)		Location
Colour/No.	Name	Between stations	Total	Location
NS-01	Ōmiya 大宮	—N/a	0 (0)	Ōmiya-ku, Saitama
NS-02	Tetsudō-Hakubutsukan 鉄道博物館	1.5 (0.93)	1.5 (0.93)	Ōmiya-ku, Saitama
NS-03	Kamonomiya 加茂宮	1.7 (1.1)	3.2 (2.0)	Kita-ku, Saitama
NS-04	Higashi-Miyahara 東宮原	0.8 (0.50)	4.0 (2.5)	Kita-ku, Saitama
NS-05	Komba 今羽	0.8 (0.50)	4.8 (3.0)	Kita-ku, Saitama
NS-06	Yoshinohara 吉野原	0.8 (0.50)	5.6 (3.5)	Kita-ku, Saitama
NS-07	Haraichi 原市	0.8 (0.50)	6.4 (4.0)	Ageo
NS-08	Shōnan 沼南	0.8 (0.50)	7.2 (4.5)	Ageo
NS-09	Maruyama 丸山	1.0 (0.62)	8.2 (5.1)	Ina
NS-10	Shiku 志久	1.2 (0.75)	9.4 (5.8)	Ina
NS-11	Ina-Chūō 伊奈中央	1.1 (0.68)	10.5 (6.5)	Ina
NS-12	Hanuki 羽貫	1.1 (0.68)	11.6 (7.2)	Ina
NS-13	Uchijuku 内宿	1.1 (0.68)	12.7 (7.9)	Ina

The line's depot is located near Maruyama Station.

== Rolling stock ==
As of 15 February 2026, the following train types are used on the line, all formed as six-car sets.

=== 2000 series ===
The 2000 series fleet consists of seven 6-car sets, numbered 01 to 07. Built by Kawasaki Heavy Industries, the trains have stainless steel bodies with different colours on the front ends and bodyside stripes. The cars retain the 8-metre (26 ft) length of the previous fleet but are 160 millimetres (6.3 in) wider and have ceilings 30 millimetres (1.2 in) higher to provide additional capacity and reduce crowding.

Set 01 entered service on 22 May 2007. Set 07 was delivered in December 2014, completing the fleet.

Set	Car numbers						Livery	Date introduced
01	2101	2201	2301	2401	2501	2601	Reddish-purple	May 2007
02	2102	2202	2302	2402	2502	2602	Orange	March 2010
03	2103	2203	2303	2403	2503	2603	Green	February 2011
04	2104	2204	2304	2404	2504	2604	Yellow	December 2011
05	2105	2205	2305	2405	2505	2605	Blue	December 2012
06	2106	2206	2306	2406	2506	2606	Red	December 2013
07	2107	2207	2307	2407	2507	2607	Cherry blossom pink	December 2014

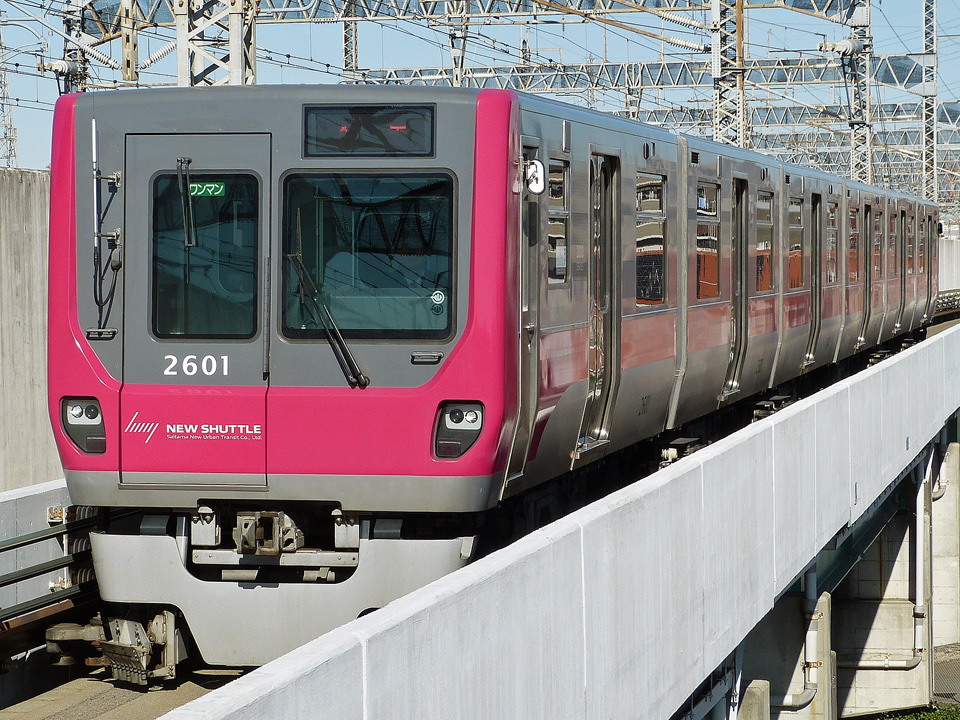
Set 01 (reddish-purple)

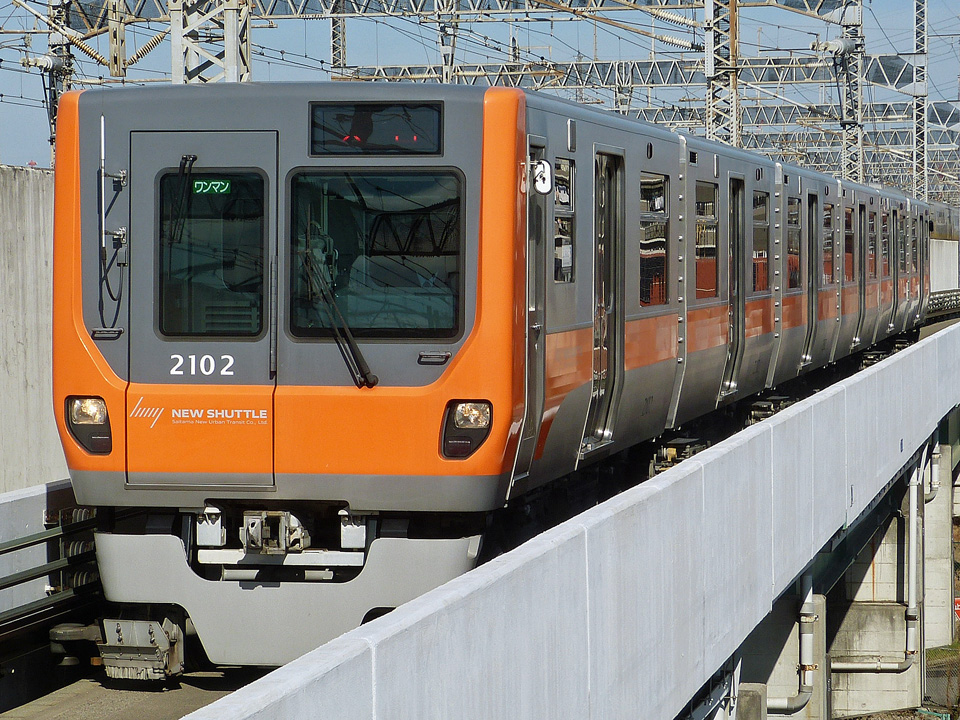
Set 02 (orange)

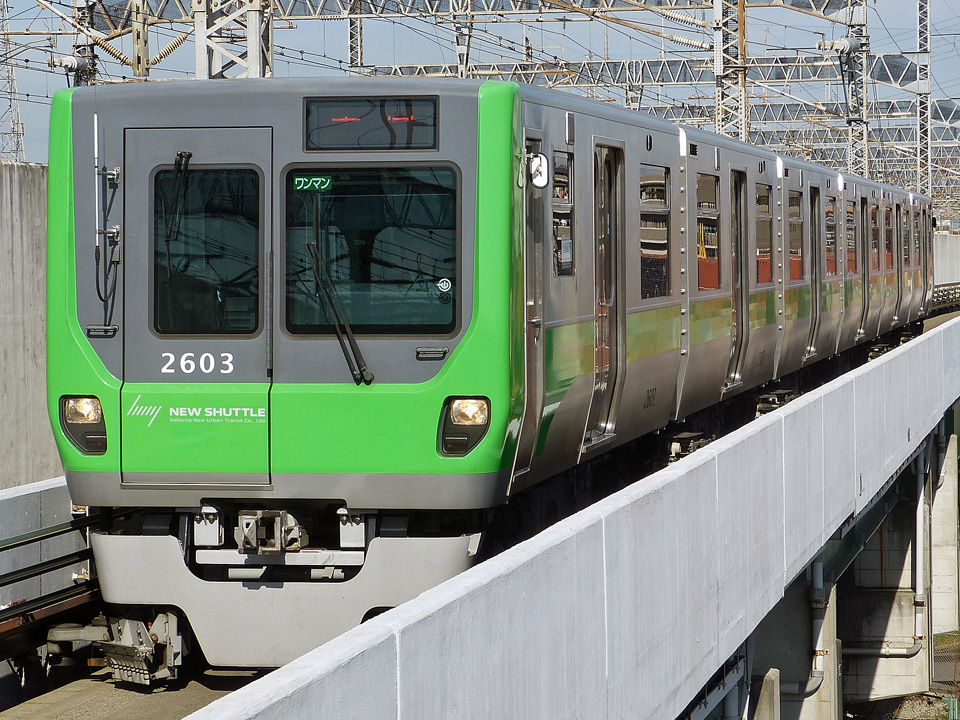
Set 03 (green)

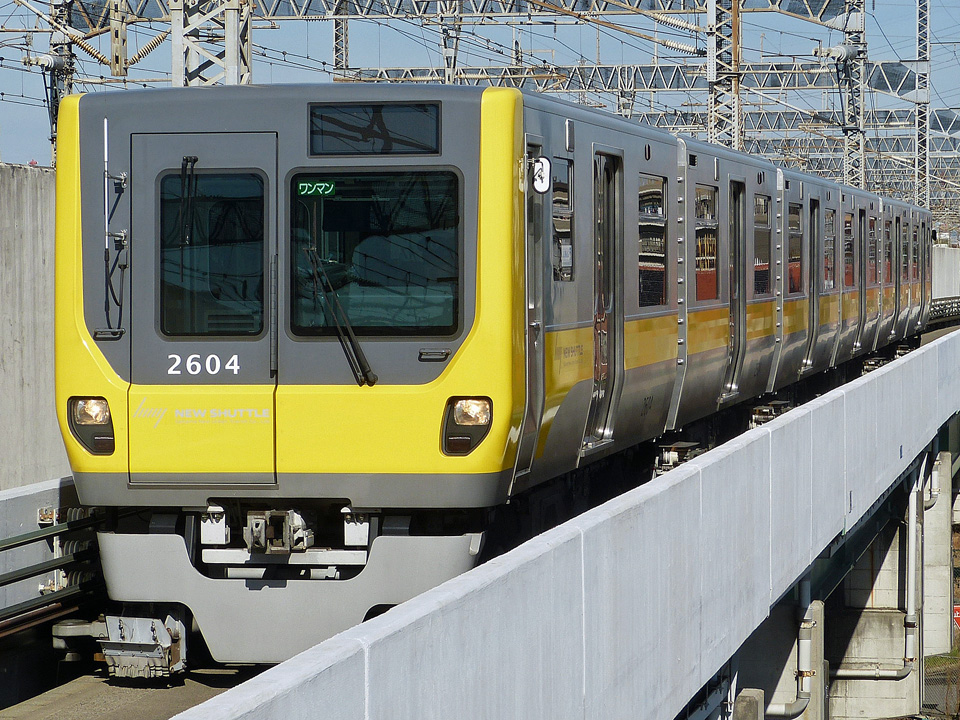
Set 04 (yellow)

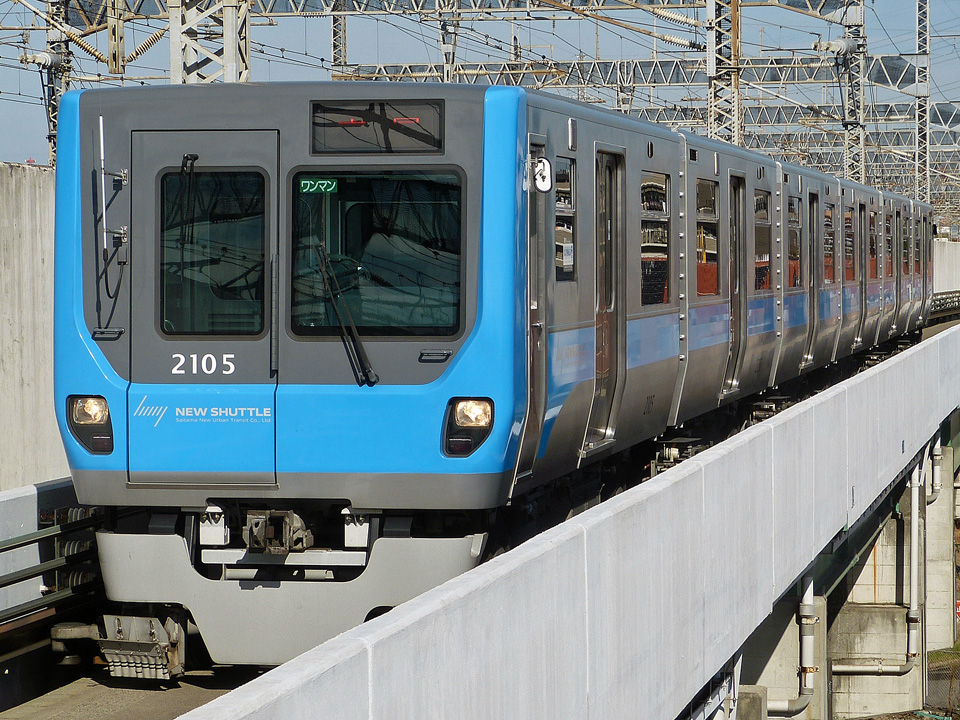
Set 05 (blue)

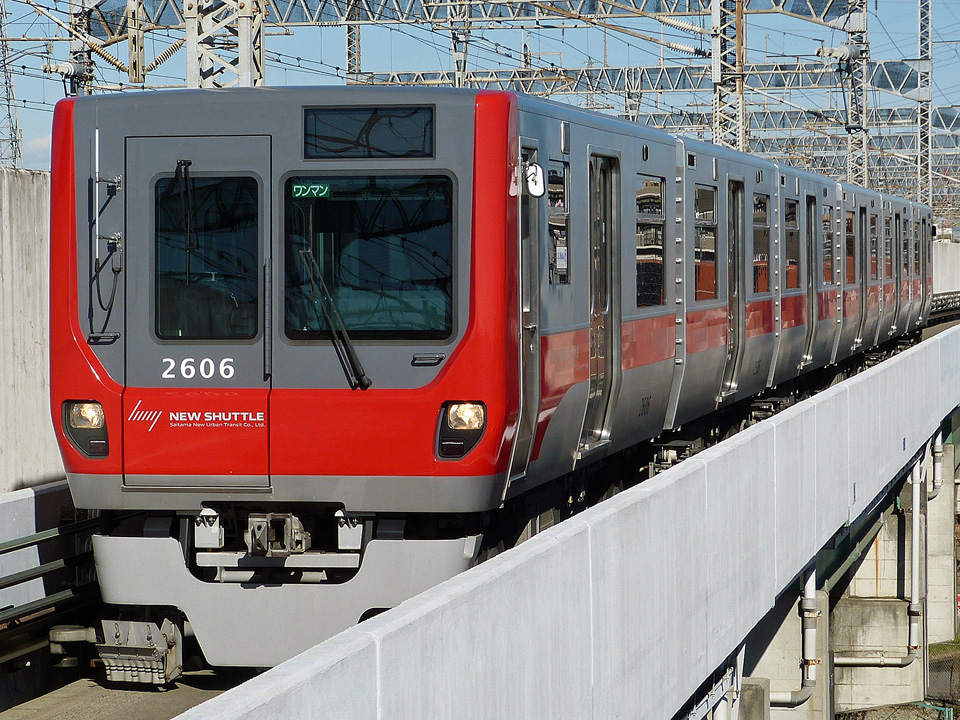
Set 06 (red)

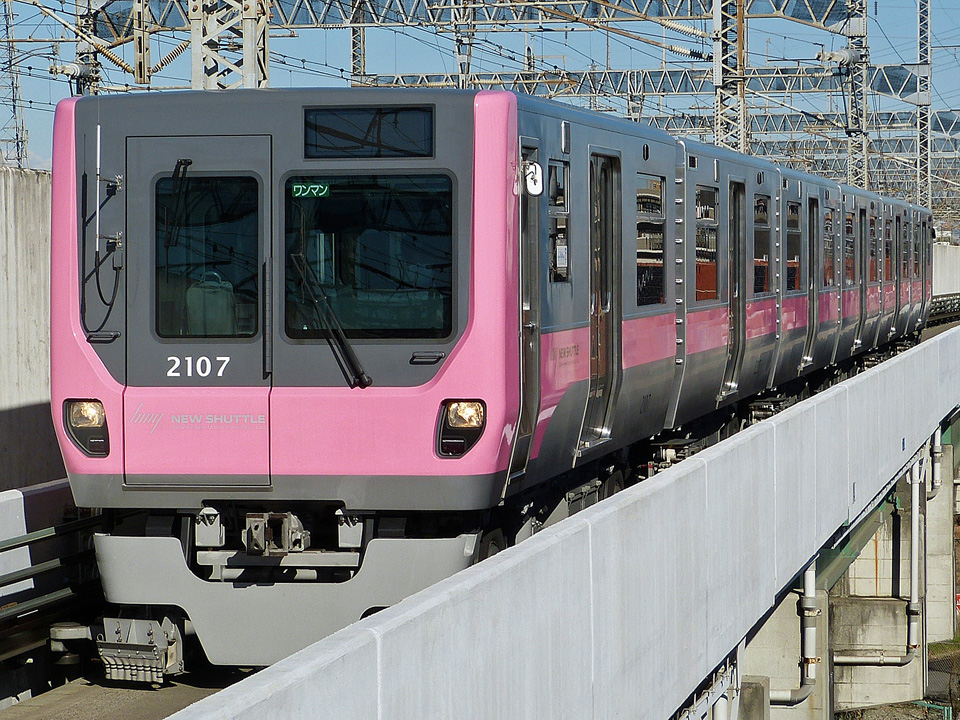
Set 07 (cherry blossom pink)

=== 2020 series ===
The 2020 series fleet consists of six 6-car sets, numbered 21 to 26. Built by Mitsubishi Heavy Industries, the trains are marketed by the manufacturer as Urbanismo-16, referring to their gross weight of 16 tonnes (35,000 lb) per car. The cars have aluminium bodies, carbon-fiber-reinforced polymer front ends, and lightweight bogies, making them approximately 1 tonne (2,200 lb) lighter than earlier series. Their hexagonal cross-section bulges slightly outward on both sides, allowing the seatbacks to be angled for greater comfort. Each set has a different accent colour corresponding to one of the colours in the company's logo, as part of a seven-colour scheme developed for the fleet. The 2020 series received a Good Design Award in 2016 for its design, including its use of interior space and safety and comfort features.

Set 21 entered service on 4 November 2015. Set 26 was delivered in November 2024, completing the fleet.

Set	Car numbers						Livery	Date introduced
21	2121	2221	2321	2421	2521	2621	"Green crystal"	November 2015
22	2122	2222	2322	2422	2522	2622	"Bright amber"	February 2016
23	2123	2223	2323	2423	2523	2623	"Pure ruby"	June 2016
24	2124	2224	2324	2424	2524	2624	"Golden topaz"	February 2019
25	2125	2225	2325	2425	2525	2625	"Twilight amethyst"	February 2020
26	2126	2226	2326	2426	2526	2626	"Rainbow"	November 2024

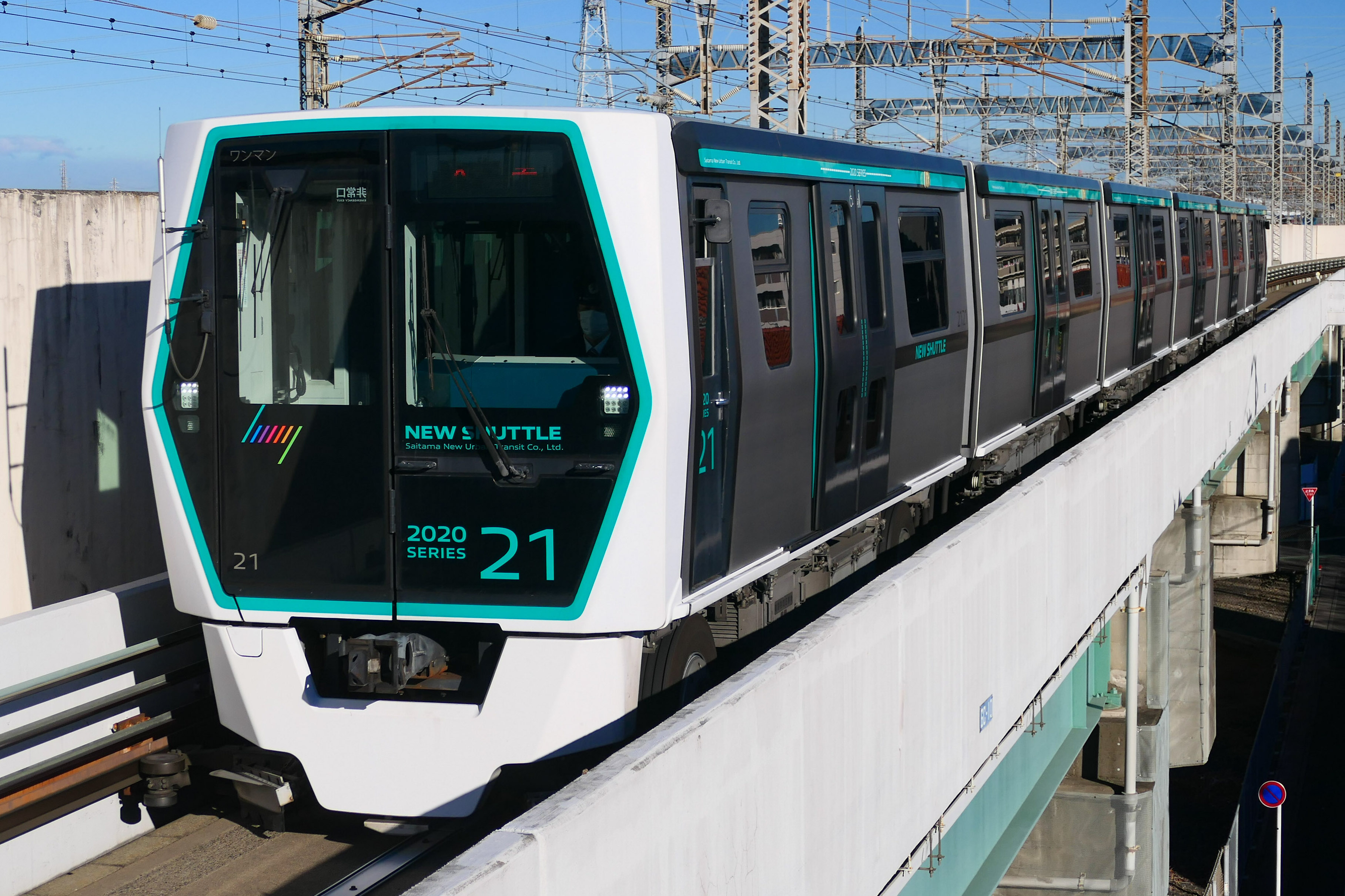
Set 21 (green crystal)

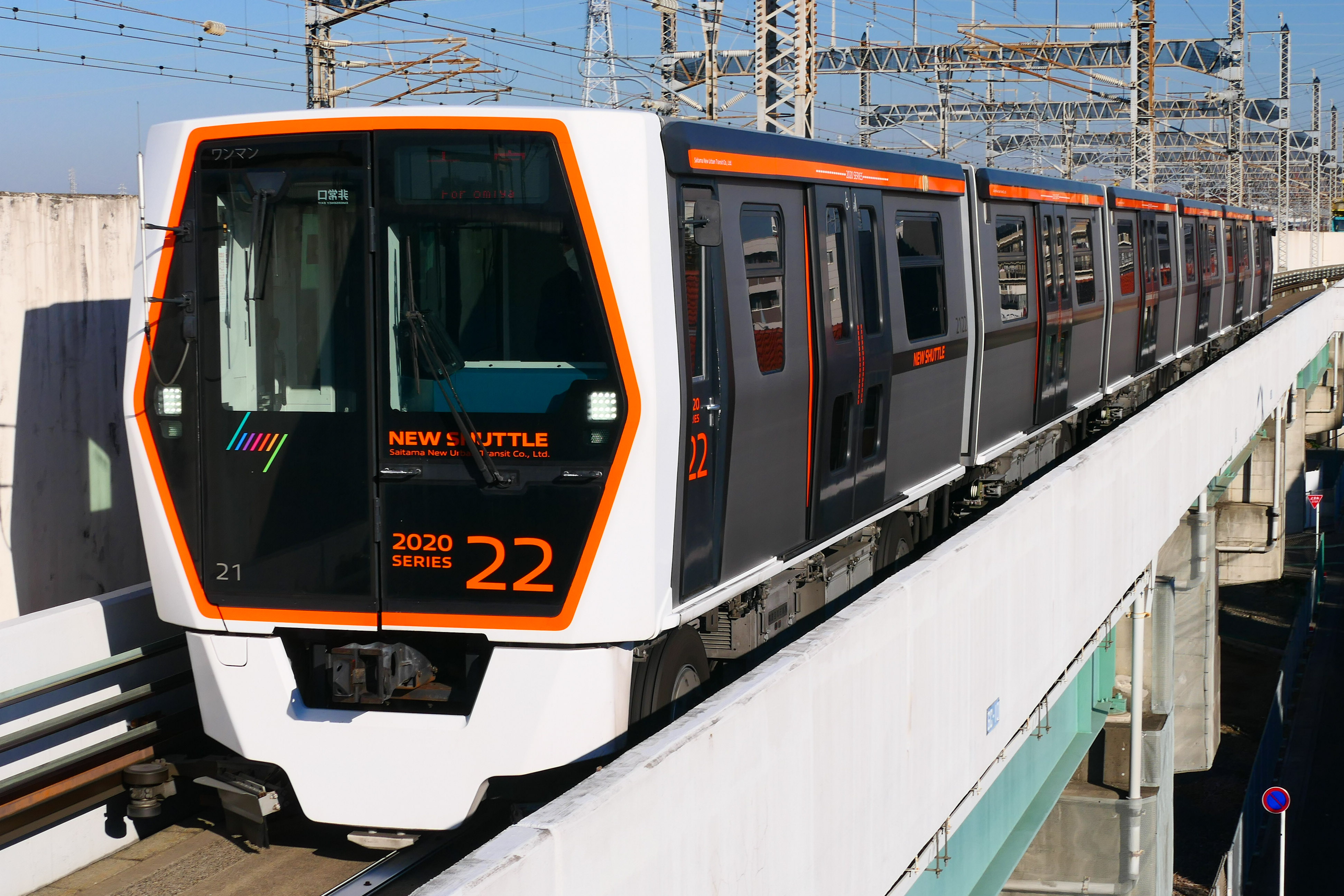
Set 22 (bright amber)

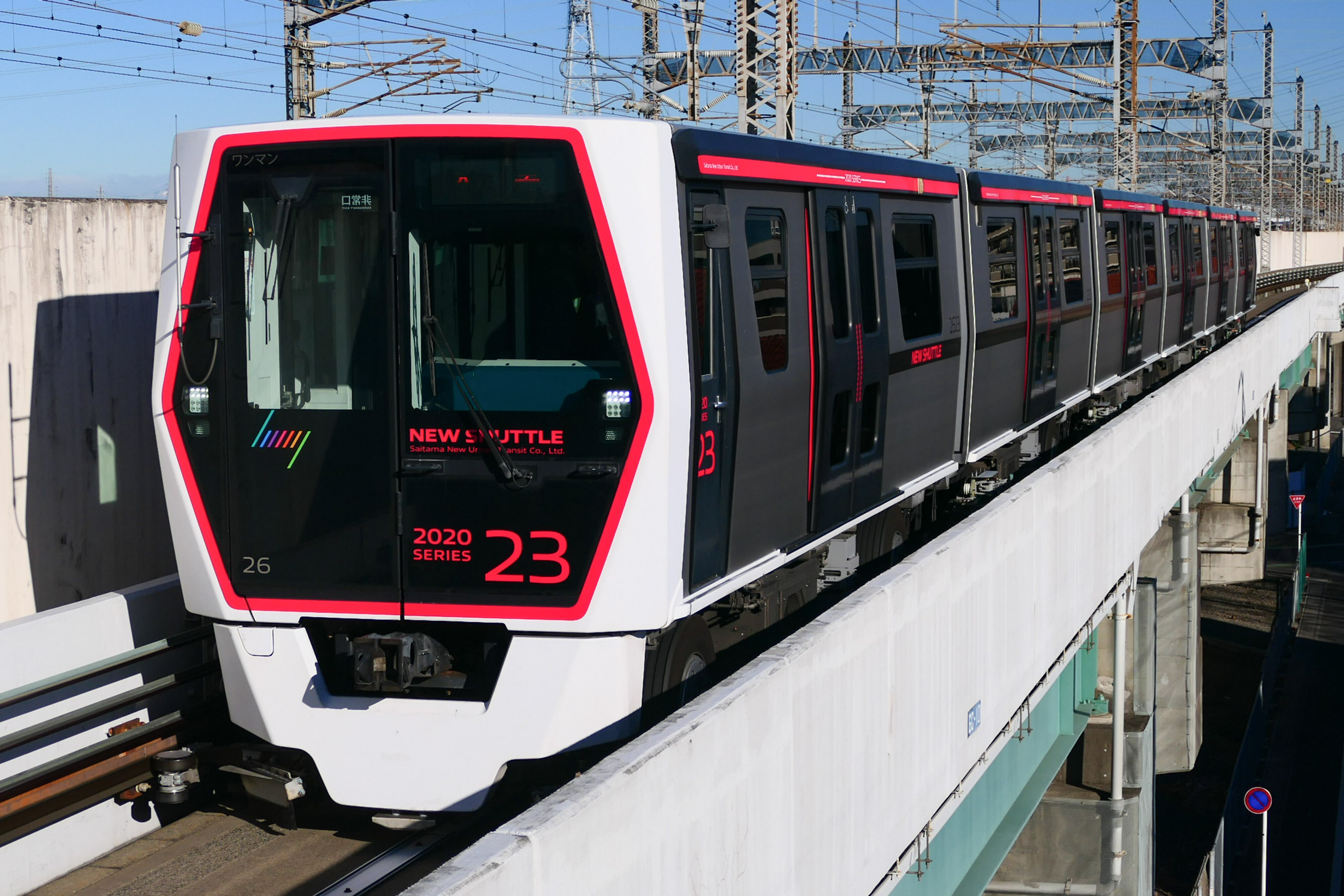
Set 23 (pure ruby)

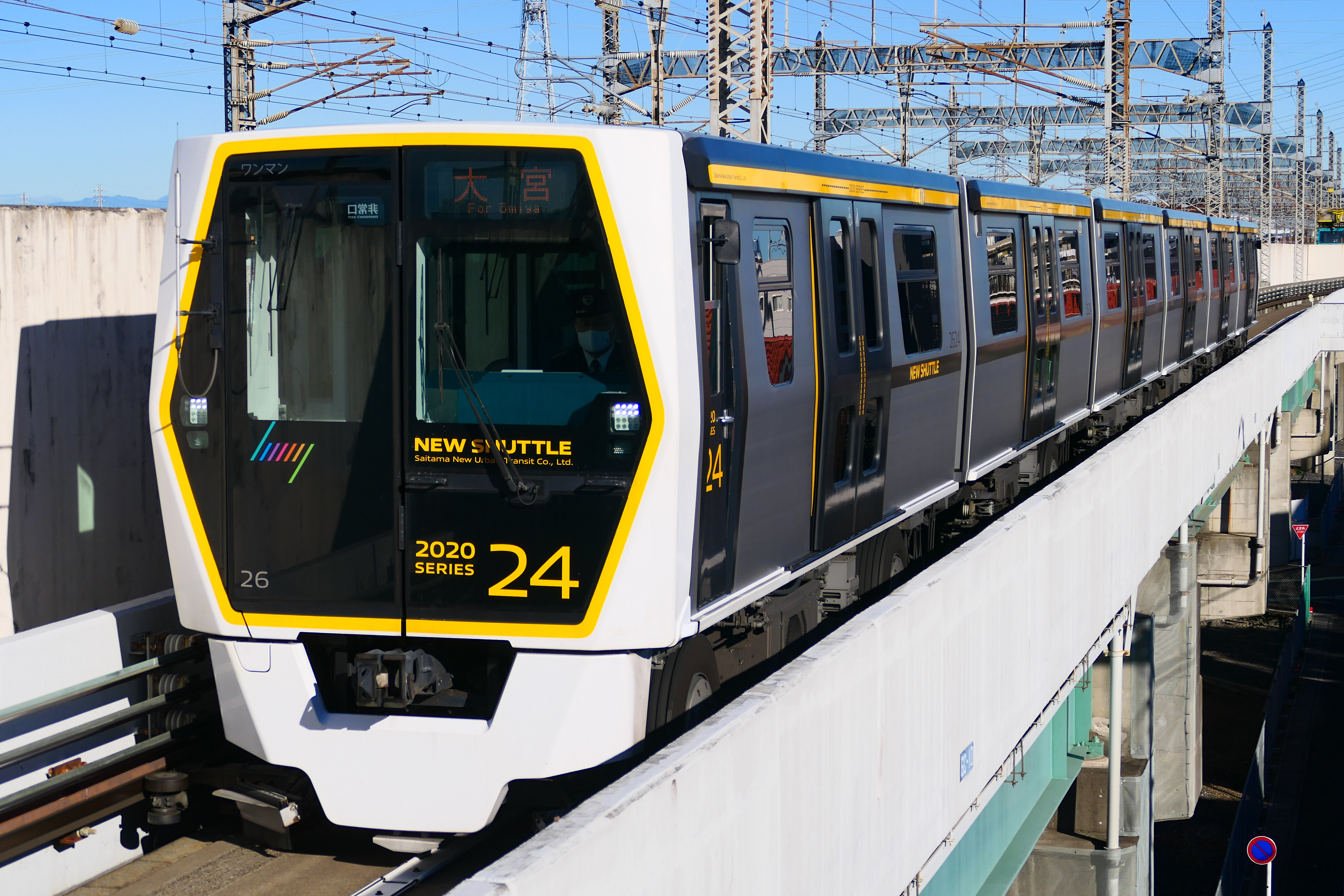
Set 24 (golden topaz)

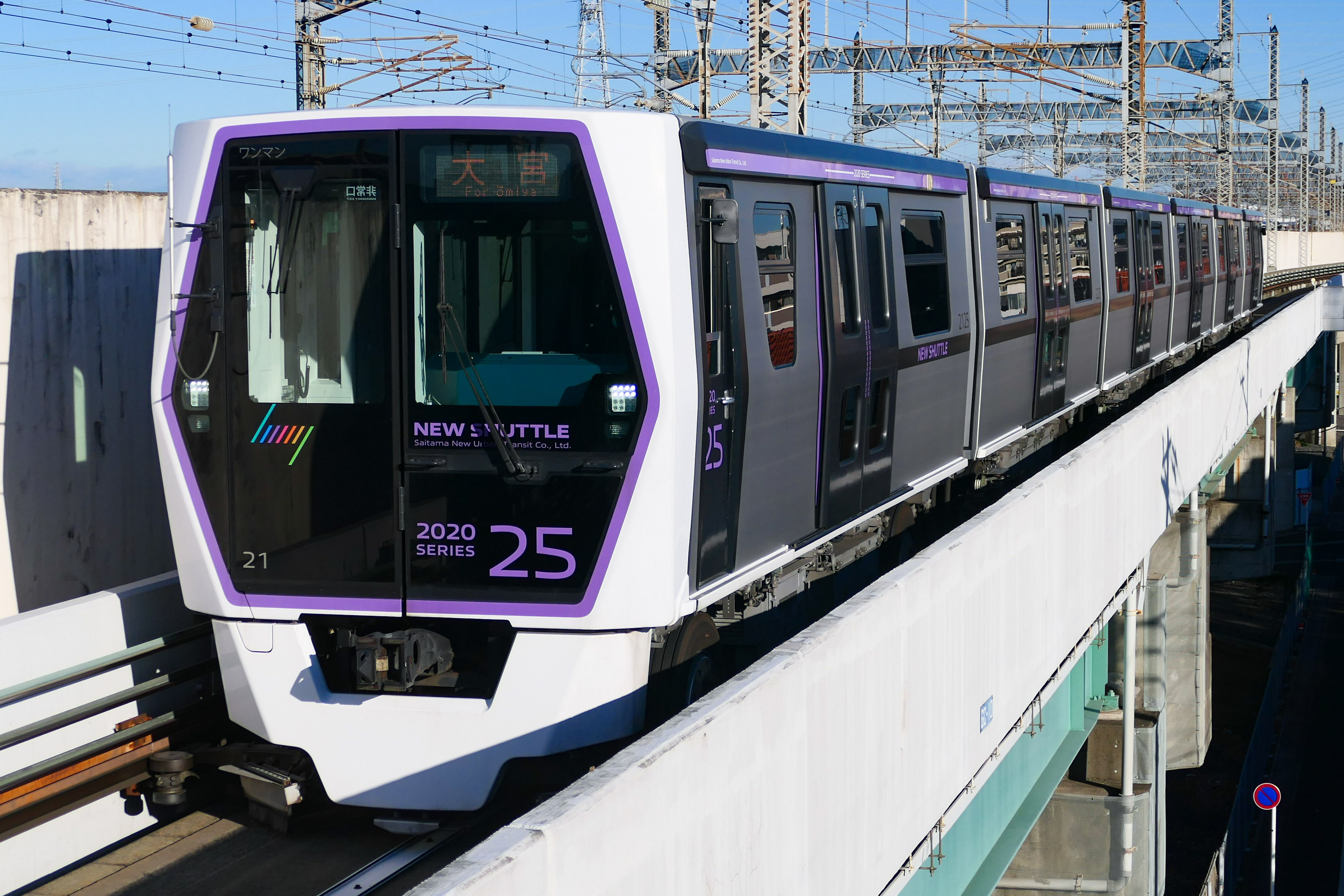
Set 25 (twilight amethyst)

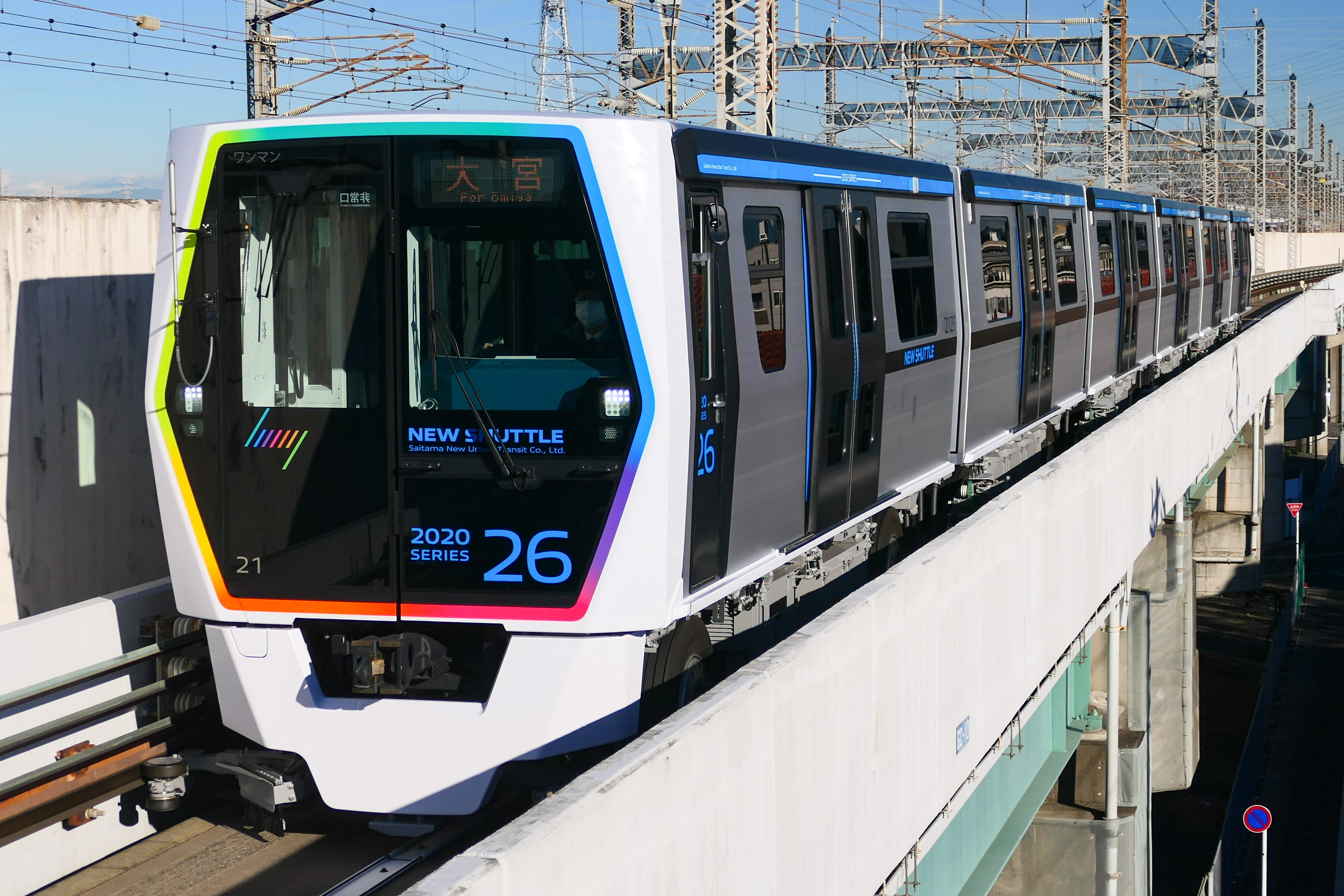
Set 26 (rainbow)

=== Former rolling stock ===
The 1000 series was produced by Kawasaki Heavy Industries and Niigata Iron Works and entered service when the line opened in 1983, initially comprising two six-car sets and seven four-car sets. Beginning in 1994, additional cars were built to lengthen the 1000 series to six-car sets, which were renumbered as the 1010 series. Four six-car 1050 series sets were also introduced from 1994 to expand the fleet. The last 1010 series set was retired on June 26, 2016. The last 1050 series set was withdrawn on February 15, 2026.

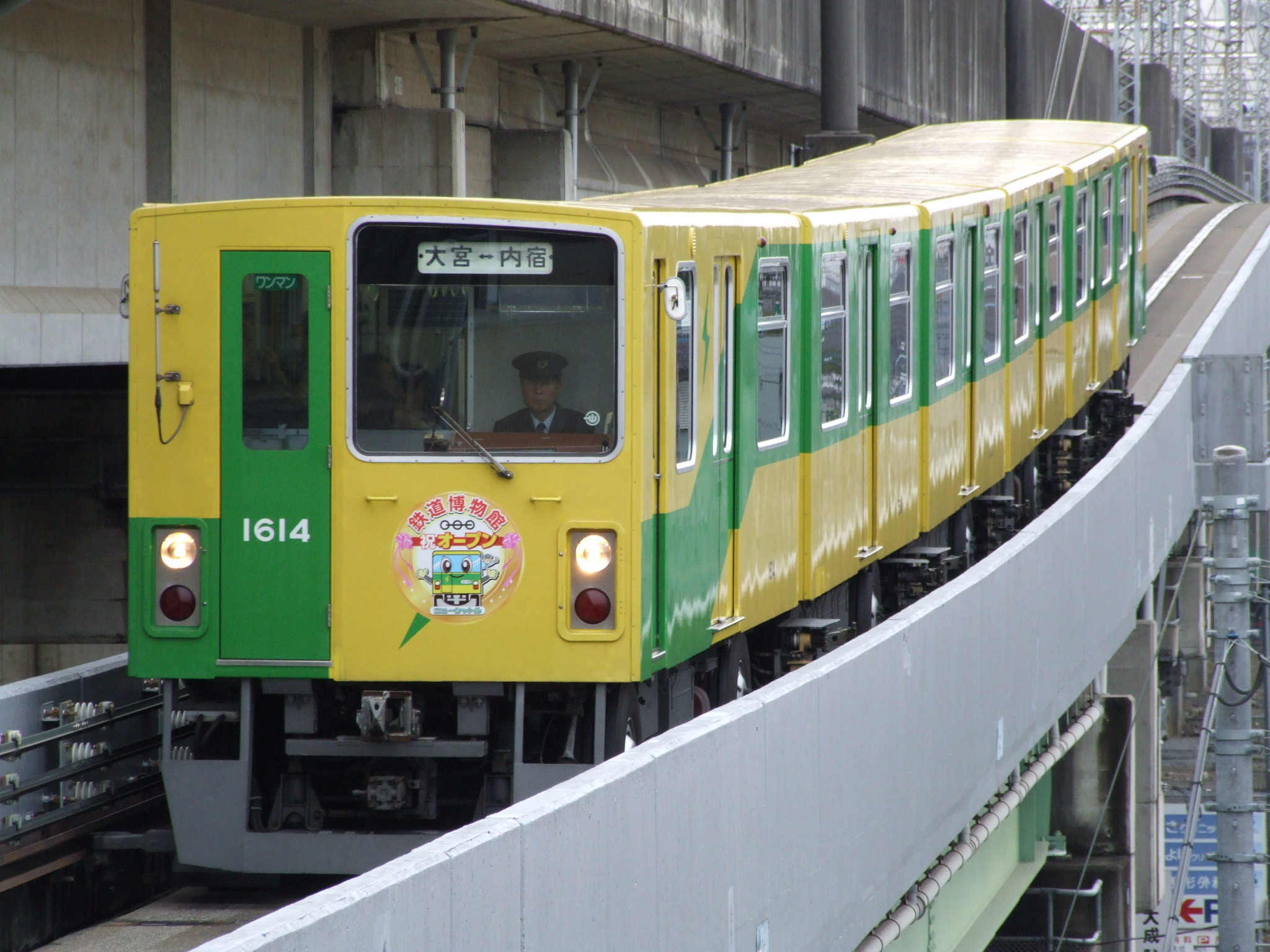
1010 series set 14 in November 2007

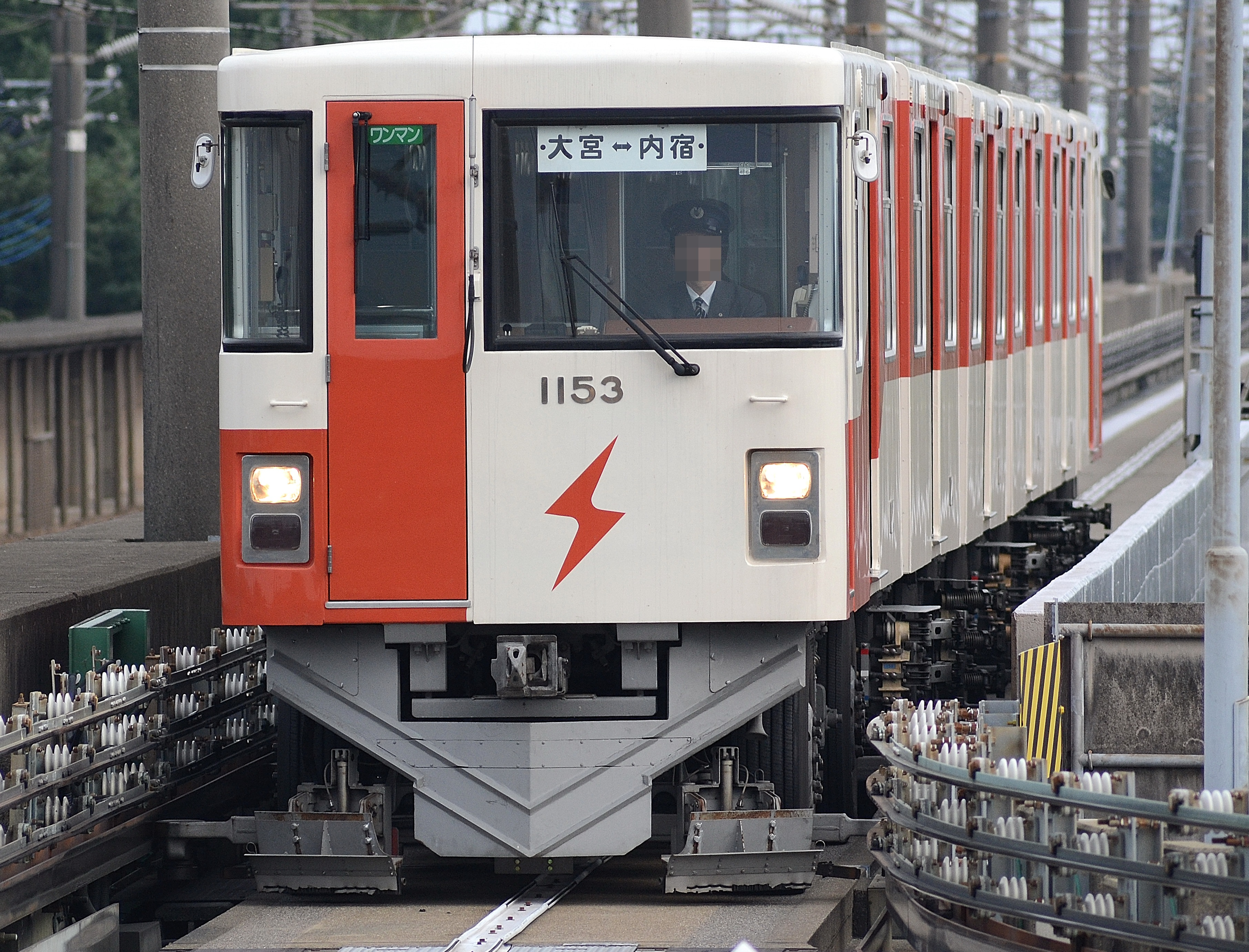
1050 series set 53 in October 2014, repainted into its original livery

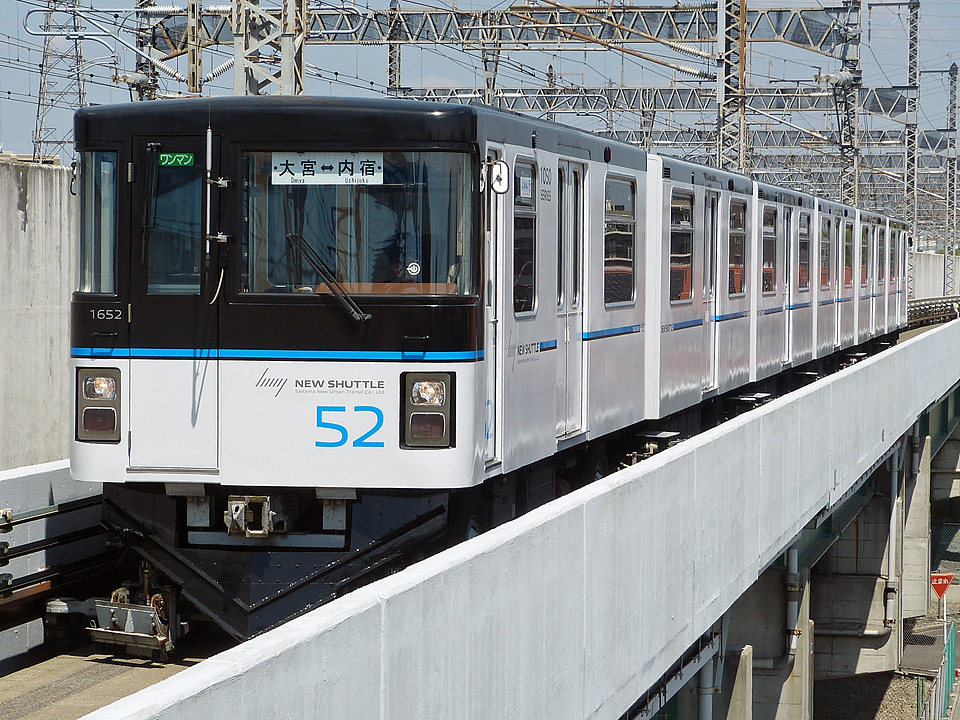
1050 series set 52 in April 2019 its final livery

== History ==
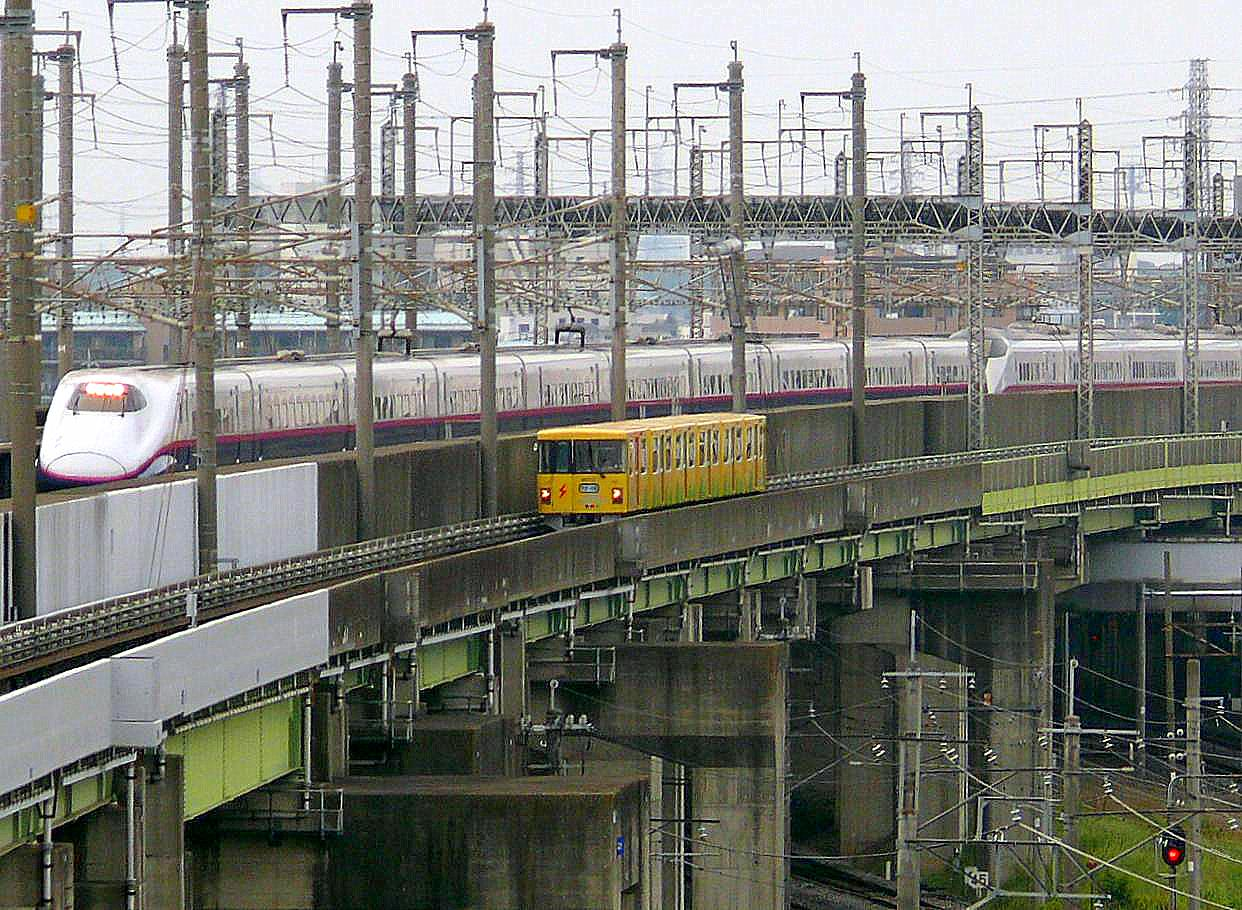
A yellow New Shuttle train running alongside a Shinkansen train

In the early 1970s, planning for what became the Tōhoku and Jōetsu Shinkansen progressed in parallel. However, construction planning took place amid growing public concern over noise and vibration from the Tōkaidō and San'yō Shinkansen.

Opposition developed along parts of the planned Tōhoku and Jōetsu corridors. In Ina, where the two Shinkansen lines were planned to branch, residents opposed the project because the construction would divide the town into three sections. Through the efforts of Misao Kato, then the mayor of Ina, an agreement was reached to construct a transit line as compensation for the affected communities, including residents of the neighboring Ōmiya, Ageo, and Ina municipalities. A standard railway was considered excessive given the anticipated demand along the corridor, so a people mover, then a relatively new technology, was chosen as a medium-capacity option. Residents of Toda, Urawa and Yono received a separate heavy-rail route, the Saikyō Line. To reduce costs, the line was built to be manually operated.

Saitama New Urban Transit Co., Ltd. was incorporated on 1 April 1980, to operate the new line. The company applied for a local railway business license on 4 December 1980 and received it on 3 April 1981. Construction began on 15 October 1981 and was completed in April 1983.

The first section, between Ōmiya and Hanuki, opened on 22 December 1983. The line initially operated with 1000 series trains, and approximately half of the services ran only between Ōmiya and Maruyama; services north of Maruyama operated at 40-minute intervals during the daytime.

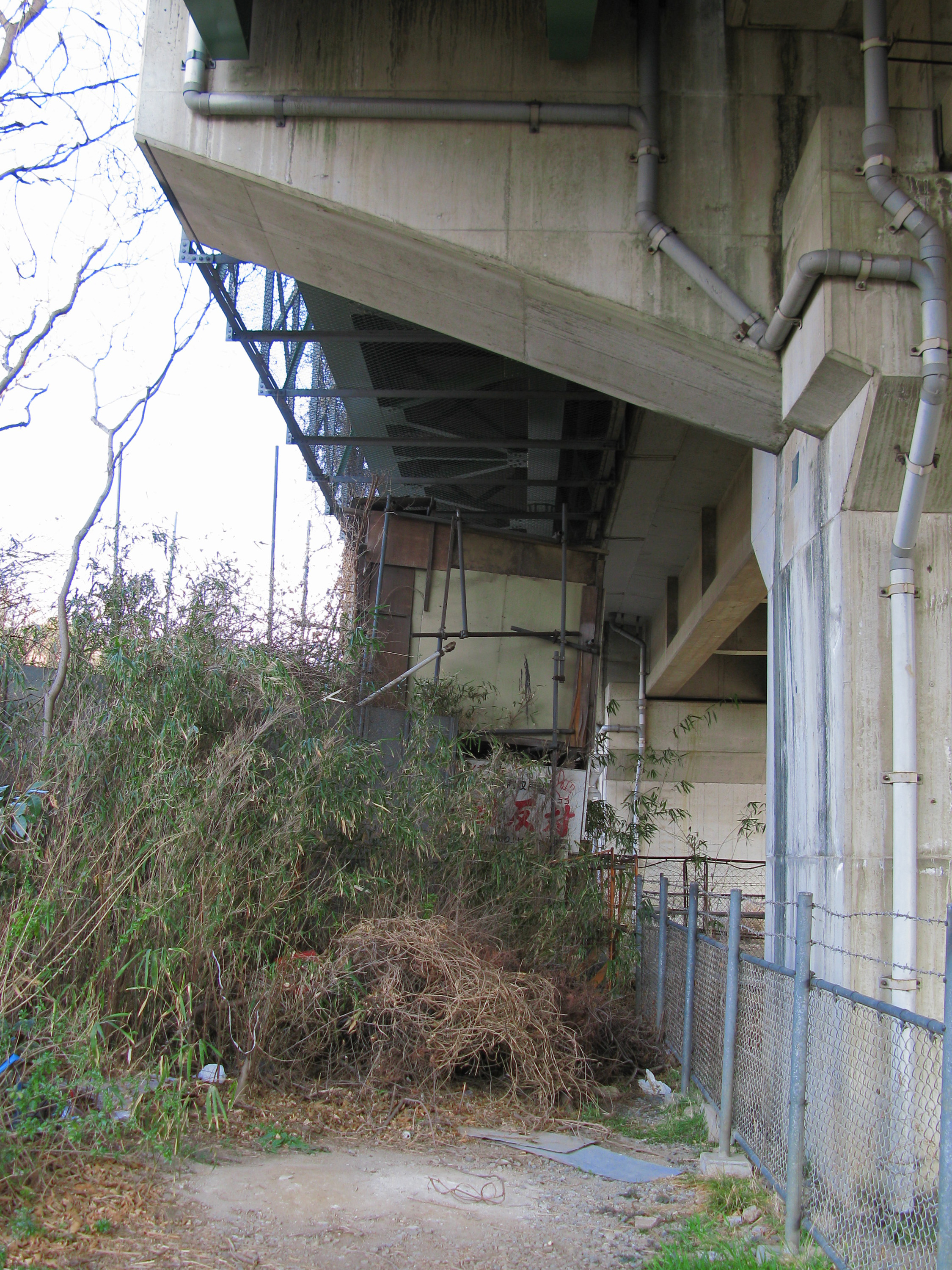
Remnants of the hut constructed under the guideway

Construction of the remaining section between Hanuki and Uchijuku was delayed by difficulties acquiring land from two landowners along the planned route. Negotiations with one were completed in March 1988, but the other landowner, supported by activists associated with the conflicts over Narita Airport, continued to oppose the project. The landowner and activists constructed a hut beneath the planned guideway and barricaded themselves inside, while also staging protests from a tower above it. On February 17, 1990, Saitama Prefecture invoked eminent domain to clear the hut, and the landowner and activists were arrested for obstruction.

Mesh-fenced shelter erected around the guideway

Rather than seizing the land itself, the prefecture acquired an air right over the property, allowing the guideway to pass above it without acquiring the underlying land. A mesh-fenced shelter was subsequently built around the guideway to prevent the landowner from interfering with operations. Remnants of the hut and protest signs remain beneath the line.

The remaining section between Hanuki and Uchijuku opened on 2 August 1990, completing the line.

On 14 October 2007, Ōnari Station was renamed Tetsudō-Hakubutsukan (lit. 'Railway Museum') to coincide with the opening of the Saitama Railway Museum.

On 16 January 2019, a tire on the rear car of an up train suffered a puncture and blowout and derailed from the guideway between Kamonomiya and Tetsudō-Hakubutsukan. The accident suspended service on the entire line until the following afternoon, with substitute bus services provided during the disruption. Following the accident, the company began installing tire-pressure monitoring systems on its trains in 2020.

== See also ==
- List of rapid transit systems
