= Washi to Taka =

- Japanese movie poster
- Directed by: Umetsugu Inoue
- Starring: Yujiro Ishihara; Rentarō Mikuni; Yumeji Tsukioka; Ruriko Asaoka
- Distributed by: Nikkatsu
- Release date: September 29, 1957 (Japan)
- Running time: 115 minutes
- Country: Japan
- Language: Japanese

Washi to Taka (Japanese: 鷲と鷹; lit. The Eagle and the Falcon) is a 1957 color Japanese film directed by Umetsugu Inoue. Yujiro Ishihara won a Blue Ribbon Award in 1958 for best new actor in recognition of his performances in Washi to Taka and Man Who Causes a Storm (also 1957).

== Cast ==
- Yujiro Ishihara : Senkichi
- Rentarō Mikuni : Sasaki
- Yumeji Tsukioka : Akemi
- Hiroyuki Nagato : Goro
- Ruriko Asaoka : Akiko
