= Yoru no kiba =

- Japanese movie poster
- Directed by: Umetsugu Inoue
- Written by: Umetsugu Inoue
- Starring: Yumeji Tsukioka; Yujiro Ishihara; Ruriko Asaoka
- Distributed by: Nikkatsu
- Release date: January 15, 1958 (Japan)
- Running time: 102 min
- Country: Japan
- Language: Japanese

Yoru no kiba (Japanese: 夜の牙), also known as Fangs of Night, is a 1958 color Japanese film directed by Umetsugu Inoue.

== Cast ==
- Yujiro Ishihara : Sugiura Kenkichi
- Yumeji Tsukioka : Hanaoka Mari
- Ruriko Asaoka : Ogin
- Mari Shiraki : Kono Akemi
- Ko Nishimura : Kano
- Toru Abe : Akanuma
- Masumi Okada : Santa
