= Sōichi =

- Gender: Male

Origin
- Origin: Japanese
- Meaning: Different meanings depending on the kanji used

Sōichi, Soichi, Souichi or Sohichi (written: 壮一, 宗一, 聡一, 奏一 or そういち in hiragana) is a masculine Japanese given name. Notable people with the name include:

- Sōichi Aikawa (相川 宗一) (born 1942), Japanese politician
- Soichi Fujita (藤田 宗一) (born 1972), Japanese baseball player
- Soichi Ichida (1910–1986), Japanese philatelist
- Sōichi Kakeya (掛谷 宗一) (1886–1947), Japanese mathematician
- Souichi Moto (本 そういち), Japanese manga artist
- Soichi Noguchi (野口 聡一) (born 1965), Japanese astronaut
- Sōichi Ōya (大宅 壮一) (1900–1970), Japanese journalist
- Soichi Sunami (角南 壮一) (1885-1971), Japanese-American photographer
- Soichi Tanaka (田中 奏一) (born 1989), Japanese footballer
- Soichi Terada (寺田 創一) (born 1965), Japanese composer
