= Alone Across the Pacific =

1963 film

Alone on the Pacific
- Film poster
- Directed by: Kon Ichikawa
- Written by: Kenichi Horie (story and book); Natto Wada (writer)
- Produced by: Ishihara; Nikkatsu; Akira Nakai (producer)
- Starring: Yujiro Ishihara
- Cinematography: Yoshihiro Yamazaki
- Edited by: Masanori Tsujii
- Release date: 27 October 1963
- Running time: 97 minutes
- Country: Japan
- Language: Japanese

Alone Across the Pacific (太平洋ひとりぼっち, Taiheiyō Hitori-botchi) is a 1963 color (Eastmancolor) Japanese adventure film directed by Kon Ichikawa. It was entered into the 1964 Cannes Film Festival. The film is based on the book Alone on the Pacific (USA title) (Kodoku), Kenichi Horie's account of his 1962 solo voyage across the Pacific, which was the first successful Transpacific solo voyage.

== Plot ==
Yujiro Ishihara is a young yachtsman who impulsively decides to sail across the Pacific Ocean to San Francisco. On the way he encounters a ship with American passengers. He talks to them in broken English and realises that he does not have a passport. On landing in San Francisco, he receives a hero's welcome, but is scolded by the Japanese consulate.

== Cast ==
- Yujiro Ishihara as The Youth
- Masayuki Mori as Youth's Father
- Kinuyo Tanaka as Youth's Mother
- Ruriko Asaoka as Youth's Sister
- Hajime Hana as Youth's Friend
- Gannosuke Ashiya
- Kojiro Kusanagi
