= Isamu Ihara =

Japanese politician (1926–2007)

- 井原 勇

Acting Mayor of Saitama
- In office 1 May 2001 – 26 May 2001
- Preceded by: Office established
- Succeeded by: Sōichi Aikawa

Mayor of Yono
- In office 1 May 1983 – 30 April 2001
- Preceded by: Saburō Shiratori
- Succeeded by: Office abolished

Personal details
- Born: 17 November 1926 Yono, Saitama, Japan
- Died: 7 October 2007 (aged 80) Saitama City, Saitama, Japan
- Party: Independent
- Education: University of Tokyo

Isamu Ihara (井原 勇, Ihara Isamu; 17 November 1926 – 7 October 2007) was a Japanese politician. He was the last mayor of Yono, Saitama.

After graduating from the University of Tokyo, Ihara joined Niigata Engineering in 1950. He was appointed as treasurer of Yono in April 1979.

Ihara won in the mayoral election held in April 1983, succeeding Saburō Shiratori, who had governed Yono for 24 years. He served as mayor for 18 years until the city of Yono was dissolved to form the city of Saitama on 1 May 2001. He also served as acting mayor of Saitama until Sōichi Aikawa was elected as its first mayor on 27 May 2001. Ihara did not run in the mayoral election to maintain neutrality.

Ihara died of pneumonia at age 80. A statue of him was built at the ward office of Chūō to honor him in 2008.

== Honors ==
- Order of the Sacred Treasure, 3rd Class

Preceded by Saburō Shiratori	Mayor of Yono; 1983–2001	City dissolved
