= Ashita wa Ashita no Kaze ga Fuku =

1958 film

- Japanese movie poster
- Directed by: Umetsugu Inoue
- Distributed by: Nikkatsu
- Release date: April 29, 1958 (Japan)
- Country: Japan
- Language: Japanese

Ashita wa Ashita no Kaze ga Fuku (Japanese: 明日は明日の風が吹く), also known as Tomorrow Is Another Day, is a 1958 color Japanese film directed by Umetsugu Inoue.

== Cast ==
- Yujiro Ishihara
- Mie Kitahara
- Kaku Takashina
- Nobuo Kaneko
