= List of high schools in Saitama Prefecture =

This is a list of high schools in Saitama Prefecture.

== National ==
- Senior High School at Sakado, University of Tsukuba

== Prefectural ==
Saitama Prefectural Board of Education operates:

- Saitama Prefectural Hatogaya High School
- Saitama Prefectural High School of the Arts
- Saitama Prefectural Kawaguchi High School
- Saitama Prefectural Kawaguchi Kita High School
- Saitama Prefectural Kawaguchi Technical High School
- Saitama Prefectural Kawaguchi Seiryo High School
- Saitama Prefectural Kawaguchi Higashi High School
- Saitama Prefectural Tokorozawa High School
- Saitama Prefectural Tokorozawa Kita High School
- Saitama Prefectural Tokorozawa Commercial High School
- Saitama Prefectural Tokorozawa Chuo High School
- Saitama Prefectural Tokorozawa Nishi High School

== Municipal ==
- Kawaguchi Municipal High School
- Saitama Municipal Omiya Kita High School
- Saitama Municipal Urawa Junior and Senior High School
- Saitama Municipal Urawa Minami High School
- Saitama Municipal Ohmiya International Secondary School

== Private ==
- Keio Shiki Senior High School
- Yamamura International High School
