= Shori-sha =

- Japanese movie poster
- Directed by: Umetsugu Inoue
- Written by: Toru Kino (writer); Isamu Onoda (writer)
- Screenplay by: Toshio Masuda; Umetsugu Inoue
- Starring: Tatsuya Mihashi; Yujiro Ishihara; Yoko Minamida; Taiji Tonoyama; Jo Shishido; Mie Kitahara
- Distributed by: Nikkatsu
- Release date: May 1, 1957 (Japan)
- Running time: 98 minutes
- Country: Japan
- Language: Japanese

Shori-sha (Japanese: 勝利者), also known as The Champion, is a 1957 color Japanese film directed by Umetsugu Inoue.

== Cast ==
- Tatsuya Mihashi as Yamashiro Kikichi
- Yujiro Ishihara as Buma Shuntarō
- Yoko Minamida as Miyagawa Natsuko
- Mie Kitahara as Shiraki Mari
- Jo Shishido as Ishiyama
- Taiji Tonoyama
- Tour Abe
- Akira Kobayashi
