= Kawakami Tetsuharu monogatari sebangō 16 =

- DVD cover art
- Directed by: Eisuke Takizawa
- Produced by: Nikkatsu
- Release date: January 3, 1957 (Japan)
- Running time: 80 minutes
- Country: Japan
- Language: Japanese

Kawakami Tetsuharu monogatari sebangō 16 (Japanese: 川上哲治物語 背番号１６; lit. Story of Tetsuharu Kawakami: Number 16) is a 1957 black-and-white Japanese film directed by Eisuke Takizawa.

The film is about Japanese baseball player Tetsuharu Kawakami.

== Cast ==
- Shinoda Yoshihiro (信田義弘) as Tetsuharu Kawakami (a boy)
- Shinsuke Maki (牧真介) as Tetsuharu Kawakami (youth)
- Tetsuharu Kawakami as himself
- Akira Kobayashi
- and others
