= Ishiwara =

Ishiwara (written: 石原) is a Japanese surname. Notable people with the surname include:

- Jun Ishiwara (石原 純, 1881–1947), Japanese theoretical physicist
- Kanji Ishiwara (石原 莞爾, 1889–1949), Japanese general

== See also ==
- Ishiwara Station, a railway station in Kumagaya, Saitama Prefecture, Japan
- Ishihara
