= Zesshō =

Zesshō 絶唱
- DVD cover
- Directed by: Eisuke Takizawa
- Based on: Zesshō by Kenji Oe
- Produced by: Nikkatsu
- Release date: 15 October 1958 (Japan)
- Running time: 108 minutes
- Country: Japan
- Language: Japanese

Zesshō (Japanese: 絶唱) is a 1958 black-and-white Japanese film directed by Eisuke Takizawa. It is based on a novel of the same name by Kenji Oe. The film was remade three times.

== Cast ==
- Ruriko Asaoka
- Akira Kobayashi

== See also ==
- Zesshō (disambiguation) (絶唱)
