= Subarashiki dansei =

- Japanese movie poster
- Directed by: Umetsugu Inoue
- Written by: Umetsugu Inoue
- Distributed by: Nikkatsu
- Release date: July 6, 1958 (Japan)
- Country: Japan
- Language: Japanese

Subarashiki dansei (Japanese: 素晴しき男性), also known as That Wonderful Guy, is a 1958 Japanese film directed by Umetsugu Inoue.

== Cast ==
- Yujiro Ishihara
- Mie Kitahara (北原三枝)
- Mari Shiraki : Yanagi Rumiko
