= The Temptress and the Monk =

- Theatrical release poster
- Directed by: Eisuke Takizawa
- Written by: Kyoka Izumi; Toshio Yasumi
- Produced by: Masayuki Takaki
- Starring: Yumeji Tsukioka
- Cinematography: Minoru Yokoyama
- Edited by: Masanori Tsujii
- Release date: July 1958
- Running time: 88 minutes
- Country: Japan
- Language: Japanese

The Temptress and the Monk (Japanese: 白夜の妖女, Hepburn: Byakuya no yōjo) is a 1958 Japanese fantasy film directed by Eisuke Takizawa and starring Yumeji Tsukioka and Ryoji Hayama. It was written by Kyoka Izumi based on the novel Koya hijiri by Toshio Yasumi.

The film was made in CinemaScope and Eastman Color. It was not dubbed in English, but was distributed internationally in May 1963 in subtitled format.

It was entered into the 8th Berlin International Film Festival.

== Cast ==
- Yumeji Tsukioka as the temptress
- Ryoji Hayama as Socho, the monk
- Tadashi Kobayashi as the dwarf/husband
- Ichijirô Oya as grandfather
- Jun Hamamura as the criminal
- Akitake Kôno
- Junko Miyazono
