= Midori haruka ni =

Midori haruka ni (The Green Music Box)
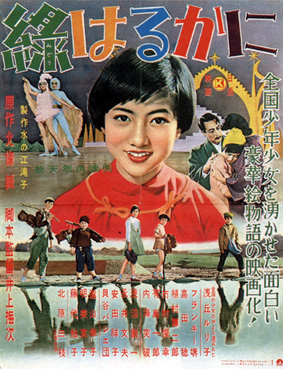
- Japanese movie poster
- Directed by: Umetsugu Inoue
- Produced by: Nikkatsu
- Release date: 8 May 1955 (Japan)
- Country: Japan
- Language: Japanese

Midori haruka ni (Japanese: 緑はるかに), also known as The Green Music Box, is a 1955 color Japanese film directed by Umetsugu Inoue.

== Overview ==
A musical action film for children, this is the first feature-length theatrical film shot in Konicolor. It is based on the eponymous novel by Makoto Hojo, and marked the debut of 14-year-old Ruriko Asaoka, who plays a girl on the run from a spy ring trying to steal her father's scientific secrets.

== Cast ==
- Ruriko: Ruriko Asaoka
- Pierrot: Frankie Sakai
- Shiratori: Mie Kitahara
- Professor Kimura (Ruriko's father): Minoru Takada
- Bikko: Toppa Utsumi
- Giant monster: Toshiyuki Ichikawa
- Ruriko's mother: Ayuko Fujishiro
- Thrift store manager: Ichirō Arishima
