= Keio Shiki Senior High School =

Private high school in Shiki, Saitama, Japan

Coordinates: 35.8241°N 139.5784°E

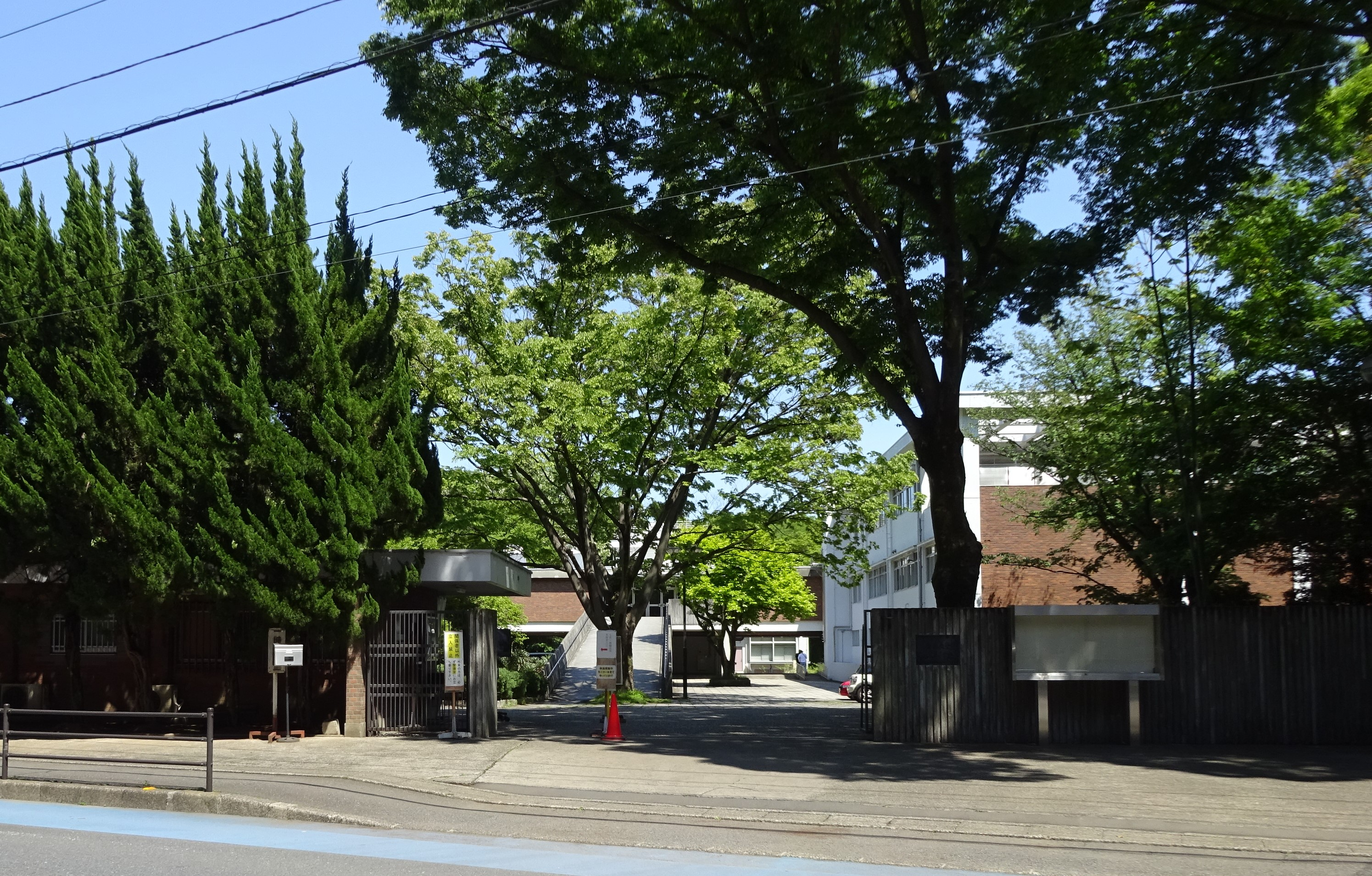
Keio Shiki Senior High School

Keio Shiki Senior High School (慶應義塾志木高等学校, Keiō Gijuku Shiki Kōtōgakkō) is a private boys' senior high school, affiliated with Keio University, in Shiki, Saitama Prefecture.

== Overview ==
Keio Agricultural Senior High School was established in 1948, and in 1957 Keio Shiki was established on that school's property, replacing it. As of 2019 there are about 750 students.

== Notable alumni ==
=== Politicians ===
- Ichiro Aisawa
- Hisayasu Nagata
- Masamune Wada
- Sōichi Aikawa

=== Other ===
- Hiroyuki Goto, Game designer
- Hideyuki Okano, Dean of Keio University School of Medicine
- Yūjirō Ishihara, Actor and Singer
- Tsuyoshi Murata, Rugby union player
- Daiki Sasaki, racing driver
- Tetsuo Sakurai, Bassist

== See also ==
- Keio University
