= Crazed Fruit =

1956 film

- Directed by: Kō Nakahira (as Yasushi Nakahira)
- Written by: Shintaro Ishihara
- Produced by: Takiko Mizunoe
- Starring: Masahiko Tsugawa; Mie Kitahara; Yujiro Ishihara
- Cinematography: Shigeyoshi Mine
- Music by: Masaru Sato; Tōru Takemitsu
- Distributed by: Nikkatsu
- Release date: July 12, 1956
- Running time: 86 minutes
- Country: Japan
- Language: Japanese

Crazed Fruit (狂った果実, Kurutta kajitsu), also known as Juvenile Jungle, is a 1956 Japanese Sun Tribe erotic drama film directed by Kō Nakahira. It is an adaptation of the novel of the same title by Shintaro Ishihara, the older brother of cast member Yujiro Ishihara, and is about two brothers who fall in love with the same woman and the resulting conflict. The film was controversial upon release because of its depiction of Japanese youth. It later was known as a foundational work of the Sun Tribe genre.

== Plot ==
Haruji, an introverted young man, and his older extroverted brother Natsuhisa arrive by train for a summer at the beach. At the station, Haruji stops and glances at a young woman before boarding. They arrive at their friend Frank's clubhouse, where Haruji constantly thinks about the woman for the next few days. While water skiing, the two brothers notice Eri, who is the same woman swimming in the water. They bring Eri into the sailboat and converse briefly until they bring her to shore.

Haruji arrives at a Kamakura station where he meets Eri again. They decide to see each other the day after tomorrow, in which Haruji teaches her to water ski. Within a few days, Frank holds a party where Haruji brings Eri. There, each brother dances with Eri until Haruji decides to drive off. Haruji parks nearby a beach where he and Eri embrace each other on the shore.

Sometime later, Natsuhisa and Frank arrive at a nightclub with their dates, and identify Eri is dancing with an older American man. Eri leaves the older man, and invites Natsuhisa at a seaside club tomorrow night. At the seaside club, Eri states she is a married woman, but her husband is mostly absent because of his job. Therefore, she has extramarital affairs with other men to occupy herself. Natsuhisa, upon learning of this revelation, begins an affair with Eri and falls in love with her.

One night, Haruji drives Eri to the beach where they embrace each other again. The next morning, Haruji tells his brother about his experience, and plans to go camping with Eri and her school friends. Consumed with jealousy, Natsuhisa arrives at Eri's residence and sleeps with her until Eri tells him to never return. The next day, Natsuhisa reads Eri's letter to Haruji, stating she is arriving a day earlier. Seizing the opportunity, Natsuhisa takes Frank's motorboat to meet Eri across the docks. Haruji later learns about Eri's letter and borrows another motorboat, hoping to catch up with them.

While Natsuhisa and Eri sleep together in the motorboat, Haruji searches for them into nightfall. The next morning, Haruji locates them but he angrily circles their motorboat for several cycles. Eri leaves the motorboat and swims towards Haruji, but he runs over and kills her. Haruji then kills Natsuhisa when he collides the motorboats. Haruji drives away with no remorse.

== Cast ==
- Masahiko Tsugawa – Haruji
- Yujiro Ishihara – Natsuhisa
- Mie Kitahara – Eri
- Harold Conway – Eri's husband
- Masumi Okada – Frank
- Shintaro Ishihara – Ishihara
