= Chitei no Uta =

- Directed by: Noguchi Hiroshi
- Produced by: Nikkatsu
- Release date: 12 December 1956
- Country: Japan
- Language: Japanese

Chitei no Uta (地底の歌; "Song of the Depths of the Earth") is a 1956 black-and-white Japanese film directed by Noguchi Hiroshi (野口博志).

== Cast ==
- Hiroshi Nawa : Tsuruta Mitsuo
- Yujiro Ishihara : Fuyu
- Kaku Takashina : Tetsu
