= Jūdai no Yūwaku =

1953 film by Seiji Hisamatsu

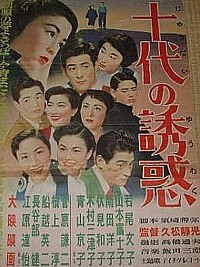
- Japanese movie poster
- Directed by: Seiji Hisamatsu
- Written by: Katsuya Susaki
- Starring: Ayako Wakao; Fujiko Yamamoto; Yōko Minamida; Kazuko Fushimi; Mitsuko Kimura
- Production company: Daiei Film
- Release date: December 29, 1953 (Japan)
- Running time: 86 minutes
- Country: Japan
- Language: Japanese

Jūdai no Yūwaku (Japanese: 十代の誘惑; lit. "Teenage Seduction") is a 1953 Japanese black-and-white film, directed by Seiji Hisamatsu.

== Cast ==
- Ayako Wakao
- Fujiko Yamamoto
- Yōko Minamida
- Kazuko Fushimi (伏見和子)
- Mitsuko Kimura (木村三津子)
- Kyōko Aoyama (青山京子)
- Kenji Sugawara (菅原謙二)
- Jun Negami
- Eiji Funakoshi
- Ken Hasebe (長谷部健)
- Tatsuyoshi Ehara (江原達怡)
