= Umetsugu Inoue =

Japanese film director (1923 – 2010)

- 井上 梅次
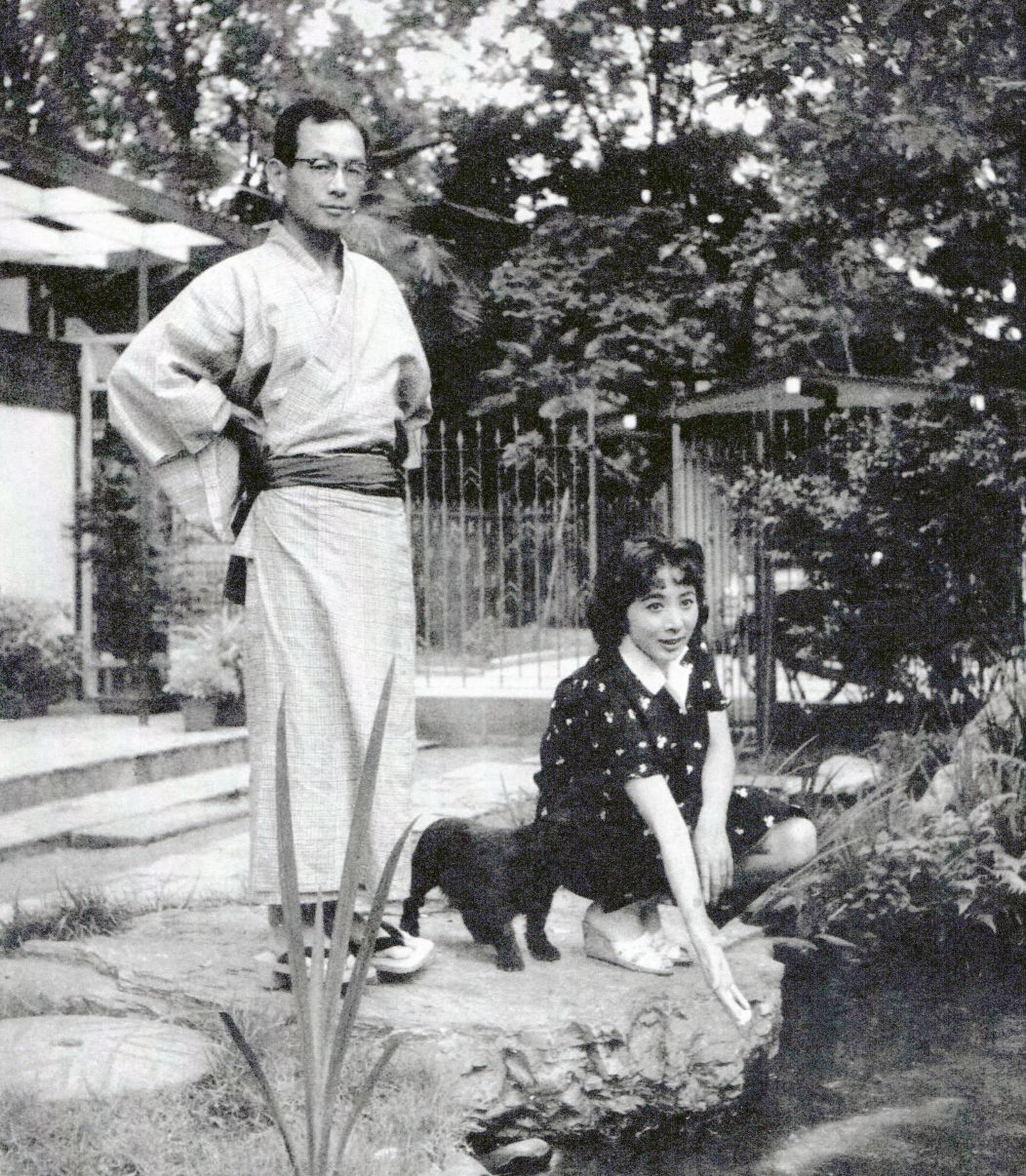
- Inoue (standing) with Yumeji Tsukioka
- Born: 31 May 1923; Japan
- Died: 11 February 2010 (aged 86); Japan
- Occupations: film director, screenwriter
- Years active: 1952–1983

Umetsugu Inoue (井上 梅次, Inoue Umetsugu; May 31, 1923 – February 11, 2010) was a Japanese film director and scriptwriter. He directed 115 movies, wrote 101 screenplays, and is credited with the original story for five films. In addition, he worked with all six major Japanese film production companies.

His film work extended to Hong Kong, and he provided technical guidance for movies there from 1966 to 1970.

He was married to the actress Yumeji Tsukioka from 1957 until his death.

On 11 February 2010, Inoue died from a cerebral hemorrhage at a hospital in Minato, Tokyo.

== Filmography ==
The filmography of Umetsugu Inoue includes:

=== Director ===
- Jazz on Parade 1954 nen: Tokyo Cinderella Musume (1954)
- Mittsu no Kao a.k.a. Three Faces (1955)
- Midori haruka ni a.k.a. The Green Music Box (1955)
- Hi no Tori (1956)
- Nikoyon Monogatari (1956)
- Crossroads of Death (1956)
- Man Who Causes a Storm (1957)
- Shori-sha (1957)
- Washi to Taka (1957)
- Arashi o Yobu yūjō a.k.a. A Friendship That Causes a Storm (1959)
- Ashita wa Ashita no Kaze ga Fuku (1958)
- Subarashiki dansei (1958)
- Yoru no kiba (1958)
- Arashi o Yobu Gakudan (1960)
- The Poem of the Blue Star (1960)
- Shōri to Haiboku (1960)
- Six Suspects (1960)
- Gonin no Totsugeki Tai (1961)
- The Man from the East (1961)
- Heiten Jikan a.k.a. Closing (1962)
- Hell's Kitchen (1962)
- Hoseki Dorobo (1962)
- Kurotokage a.k.a. Black Lizard (1962)
- Ankokugai Saidai no Kettō a.k.a. Duel of the Underworld (暗黒街最大の決闘) (1963)
- Bury Me Deep (1963)
- Daisanno Kagemusha (1963)
- The Night I Want to Dance (1963)
- Yakuza no Kunsho (1963)
- Ankokugai Odori (1964)
- Modae (1964)
- Gyangu Chōjō Sakusen (1965)
- Kuroi Yuwaku (1965)
- Yoru no Nettaigyo a.k.a. BGS of Ginza (1965)
- Koi to Namida no Taiyō (1966)
- Gekijo no Chibusa (1967)
- Hong Kong Nocturne (1967) - Director, screenwriter.
- King Drummer (1967)
- Operation Lipstick (1967) - Director, screenwriter.
- The Brain-Stealers (1968)
- Hong Kong Rhapsody (1968)
- Kushiro no Yoru (1968)
- Long Live Youth! (1969)
- The Millionaire Chase (1969)
- Apartment for Ladies (1970)
- The Five Million Dollar Legacy (1970)
- The Performers (1970)
- Whose Baby Is in the Classroom? (1970)
- Young Lovers (1970)
- The Yellow Muffler (1971)
- Lill, My Darling Witch (1971)
- Sunset (1971)
- We Love Millionaires (1971)
- The Venus Tear Diamond (1971)
- Ikare Doku Hebi: Moku Gekisha o Kese a.k.a. Cobra (1976)
- Utareru Mae ni Ute! (1976)
- Aitsu to Lullaby (1983)
- Man Who Causes a Storm (1983)
- Toshi in Takarazuka: Love Forever (1983)

=== Screenplays ===
- Mōjū Tsukai no Shōjo (1952)
