= Fūsoku 40 Metres =

- Theatrical poster
- Directed by: Koreyoshi Kurahara
- Written by: Kenrō Matsuura
- Starring: Yujiro Ishihara; Mie Kitahara; Misako Watanabe
- Cinematography: Minoru Yokoyama
- Music by: Masaru Sato
- Production company: Nikkatsu
- Release date: August 12, 1958 (Japan)
- Running time: 100 minutes
- Country: Japan
- Language: Japanese

Fūsoku 40 Metres (Japanese: 風速４０米, Hepburn: Fūsoku yonjū mētoru; lit. "Windspeed 40 Metres"), also known as The Man Who Rode the Typhoon, is a 1958 color Japanese film directed by Koreyoshi Kurahara and produced by Nikkatsu.

== Cast ==
- Yujiro Ishihara
- Mie Kitahara
- Misako Watanabe
- Nobuo Kaneko
- Jukichi Uno
