= Gozonji Azuma Otoko =

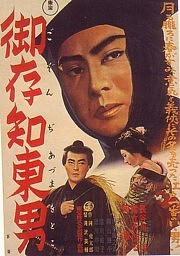
- Japanese movie poster
- Directed by: Eisuke Takizawa
- Produced by: Toho
- Release date: 29 December 1939 (Japan)
- Country: Japan
- Language: Japanese

Gozonji Azuma Otoko (Japanese: 御存知東男) is a 1939 black-and-white Japanese film directed by Eisuke Takizawa.

== Cast ==
- Kazuo Hasegawa
