= Ishihara =

Ishihara (石原; lit. "stone meadow") is a Japanese surname. Notable people with the surname include:

- Shinobu Ishihara (1879–1963), physician
  - Ishihara test, a test to determine color blindness
- Ishihara Shiko'o, (1874–1936), historian associated with the Shinpūren rebellion
- Daisuke Ishihara (born 1971), former football player
- Fujio Ishihara (born 1933), writer
- Kaori Ishihara (born 1993), voice actress and pop singer
- Katsuki Ishihara (born 1939), former freestyle swimmer
- Katsuya Ishihara (born 1978), former football player
- Kazuyuki Ishihara (born 1958), garden designer
- Kuniko "Satomi" Ishihara (born 1986), actress
- Mitsuru Ishihara, animator
- Melody Ishihara (born 1982), former J-Pop singer
- Naoko Ishihara (born 1974), sport shooter
- Shinichi Ishihara (born 1960), singer and (voice) actor
- Shintaro Ishihara (1932–2022), author, politician, governor of Tokyo
  - Hirotaka Ishihara (born 1964), politician, Shintaro's third son
  - Nobuteru Ishihara (born 1957), politician, Shintaro's eldest son
  - Yoshizumi Ishihara (born 1962), actor and weatherman, Shintaro's second son
  - Yujiro Ishihara (1934–1987), actor and singer, Shintaro's younger brother
- Takamasa "Miyavi" Ishihara (born 1981), singer-songwriter, record producer and actor
- Taku Ishihara (born 1988), former football player
- Tatsuya Ishihara (born 1966), anime director from Maizuru
- Teruto Ishihara (born 1991), MMA fighter
- Tsunekazu Ishihara (born 1957), game designer, businessman, and president of The Pokémon Company

== See also ==
- Ishiwara
- Stanley (name) - lit. "stone meadow"
