= A Warm Misty Night =

- Film poster
- Directed by: Mio Ezaki
- Screenplay by: Tatsuo Nogami; Shiō Ishimori; Mio Ezaki
- Produced by: Masayuki Takagi
- Starring: Yūjirō Ishihara; Ruriko Asaoka; Hideaki Nitani; Masako Ota; Eiji Gō; Mizuho Suzuki
- Cinematography: Minoru Yokoyama
- Edited by: Akira Suzuki
- Music by: Harumi Ibe
- Distributed by: Nikkatsu
- Release date: March 11, 1967 (Japan)
- Running time: 93 minutes
- Country: Japan
- Language: Japanese

A Warm Misty Night (Japanese: 夜霧よ今夜も有難う, Hepburn: Yogiri yo Kon'yamo Arigatō) is a 1967 Japanese film directed by Mio Ezaki. It was inspired by Yūjirō Ishihara's mega hit song of the same title.

== Plot ==
Sagara Toru proposes to his girlfriend Kitazawa Akiko. She intends to accept it but is in a traffic accident on the way to the arranged place. Sagara waits for her for a long time, but when she does not arrive, he considers his proposal rejected. Four years later, Akiko suddenly appears in front of Sagara. She asks him to leave her new boyfriend Kuen secretly from Japan.

== Cast ==
- Yūjirō Ishihara : Sagara Toru
- Ruriko Asaoka : Kitazawa Akiko
- Hideaki Nitani : Kuen
- Meiko KajiMasako Ohta : Hiromi
- Asao Sano : Detective Miyatake
- Kaku Takashina : Senkichi
- Mizuho Suzuki : Chan
- Hei Enoki : Nishi
- Eiji Gō : Bill
