= Eisuke Takizawa =

Japanese film director (1902–1965)

- 滝沢英輔
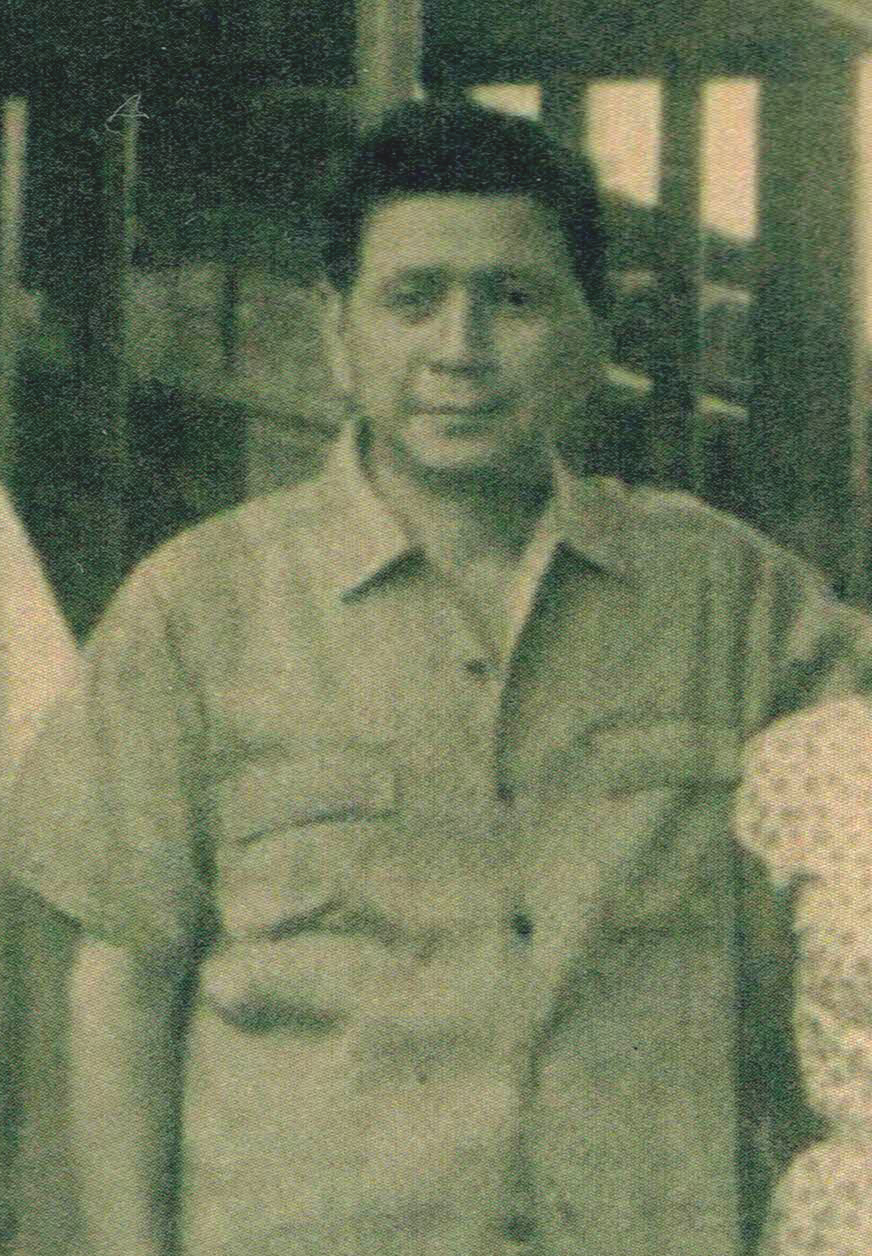
- Eisuke Takizawa in 1960
- Born: 6 September 1902; Tokyo, Japan
- Died: 29 November 1965 (aged 63)
- Occupation: Film director

Eisuke Takizawa (滝沢英輔, Takizawa Eisuke; 6 September 1902 – 29 November 1965) (alternate name: Kinpachi Kajiwara) was a Japanese film director.

== Career ==
Born in Tokyo, Takizawa worked at Tōa Cinema and Makino Film Productions before debuting as a director in 1929 with Aru onna to gaka. He later directed primarily jidaigeki at Toho and Nikkatsu.

== Filmography ==
Eisuke Takizawa directed over 80 films:

=== Director ===
- Sengoku gunto-den - Dai ichibu Toraokami (1937)
- Sengoku gunto-den - Dai nibu Akatsuki no zenshin (1937)
- Chinetsu (1938)
- Gozonji Azuma Otoko (1939)
- Nihon kengosen (1945)
- Kirare no senta (1949)
- Hakamadare yasusuke (1952)
- Yudachi kangoro (1953)
- Yasugoro desse (1953)
- Tetsuwan namida ari (1953)
- Kunisada Chūji (1954)
- Rokunin no ansatsusha (1955)
- Kawakami Tetsuharu monogatari sebangō 16 (1957)
- Kajin (1958)
- The Temptress and the Monk (1958)
- Zesshō (1958)
