= The Balloon (1956 film) =

1956 Japanese film

- Film poster
- Directed by: Yūzō Kawashima
- Written by: Shōhei Imamura; Yūzō Kawashima; Jirō Osaragi
- Produced by: Takeshi Yamamoto
- Starring: Masayuki Mori; Tatsuya Mihashi; Mie Kitahara
- Cinematography: Kuratarō Takamura
- Edited by: Tadashi Nakamura
- Music by: Toshirō Mayuzumi
- Production company: Nikkatsu
- Distributed by: Nikkatsu
- Release date: 19 February 1956; (Japan)
- Running time: 110 minutes
- Country: Japan
- Languages: Japanese; German

The Balloon (Japanese: 風船, Hepburn: Fūsen) is a 1956 Japanese drama film directed by Yūzō Kawashima. It was adapted by Kawashima and Shōhei Imamura from a novel by Jirō Osaragi.

== Plot ==
In post-war Japan, a middle aged family man connects with a woman from his past. He has two children, an arrogant son who is torn between his mistress and a new lover, and a disabled daughter who gets mixed up in the affair.

== Cast ==
- Masayuki Mori as Haruki Murakami
- Tatsuya Mihashi as Keikichi Murakami
- Mie Kitahara as Mikiko Mikihara
- Izumi Ashikawa as Tamako Murakami
- Michiyo Aratama as Kumiko Yamana
- Shirō Amakusa as Yamaguchi
- Sachiko Hidari as Ruiko

== Home media ==
In 2018, celebrating director Kawashima's 100th birthday, the Nikkatsu studio and VOD platform MUBI collaborated on a retrospective of his work to be available to stream in the US. The Balloon was among the films that were screened.
