= To Love Again (film) =

1971 film

- Theatrical poster
- Directed by: Kon Ichikawa
- Written by: Shuntaro Tanikawa
- Produced by: Sanezumi Fujimoto; Ryū Yasutake
- Starring: Renaud Verley; Ruriko Asaoka
- Cinematography: Kiyoshi Hasegawa
- Edited by: Ume Takeda
- Music by: Shunichi Makaino
- Distributed by: Toho
- Release date: 15 May 1971
- Running time: 93 minutes
- Country: Japan
- Languages: Japanese; French

To Love Again (愛ふたたび, Ai futatabi) is a 1971 Japanese drama film directed by Kon Ichikawa. It was entered into the 21st Berlin International Film Festival.

== Cast ==
- Renaud Verley - Niko
- Ruriko Asaoka - Miya
- Tetsuo Ishidate - Kee chan
- Yôko Kosono
- Graciela López Colombres - Maria
- Seiji Miyaguchi - Miya's father
- Kaori Momoi - Momoyo, Miya's sister
- Thomas Ross - Charbonnier
