= Ruriko Asaoka =

Japanese actress

- 浅丘 ルリ子
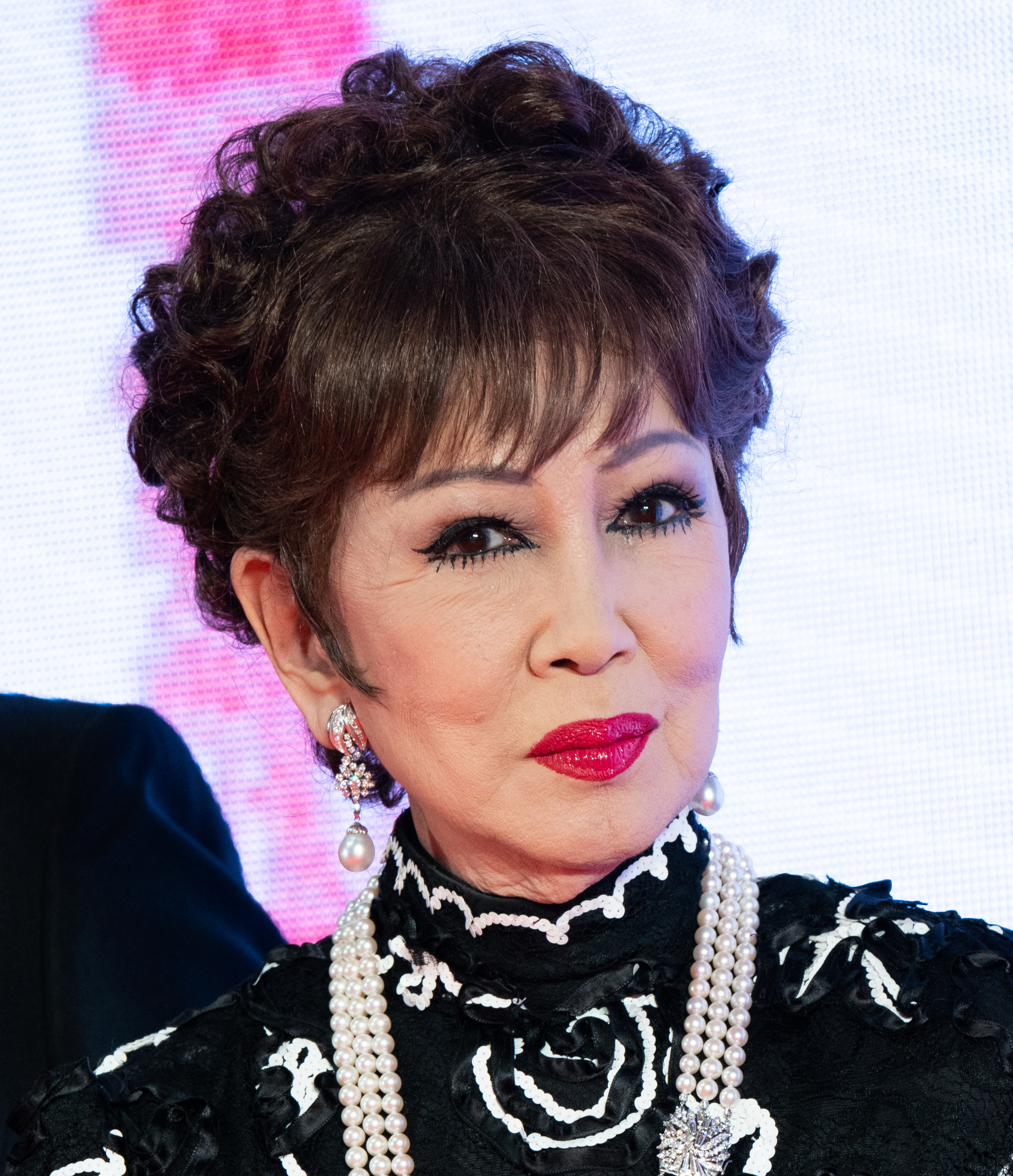
- Asaoka at Tokyo International Film Festival in 2019
- Born: Nobuko Asai; 2 July 1940 (age 86); Manchukuo (now Changchun, Jilin, China)
- Occupation: Actress
- Years active: 1954–present
- Spouse: Kōji Ishizaka (m. 1971; ann. 2000)

Nobuko Asai (浅井 暢子, Asai Nobuko; born 2 July 1940), better known by her stage name Ruriko Asaoka (浅丘 ルリ子, Asaoka Ruriko), is a Japanese actress. She gained a popularity and appeared in over 121 films, as well as mainly worked on stage in addition to an occasional television appearance.

== Early life and career ==
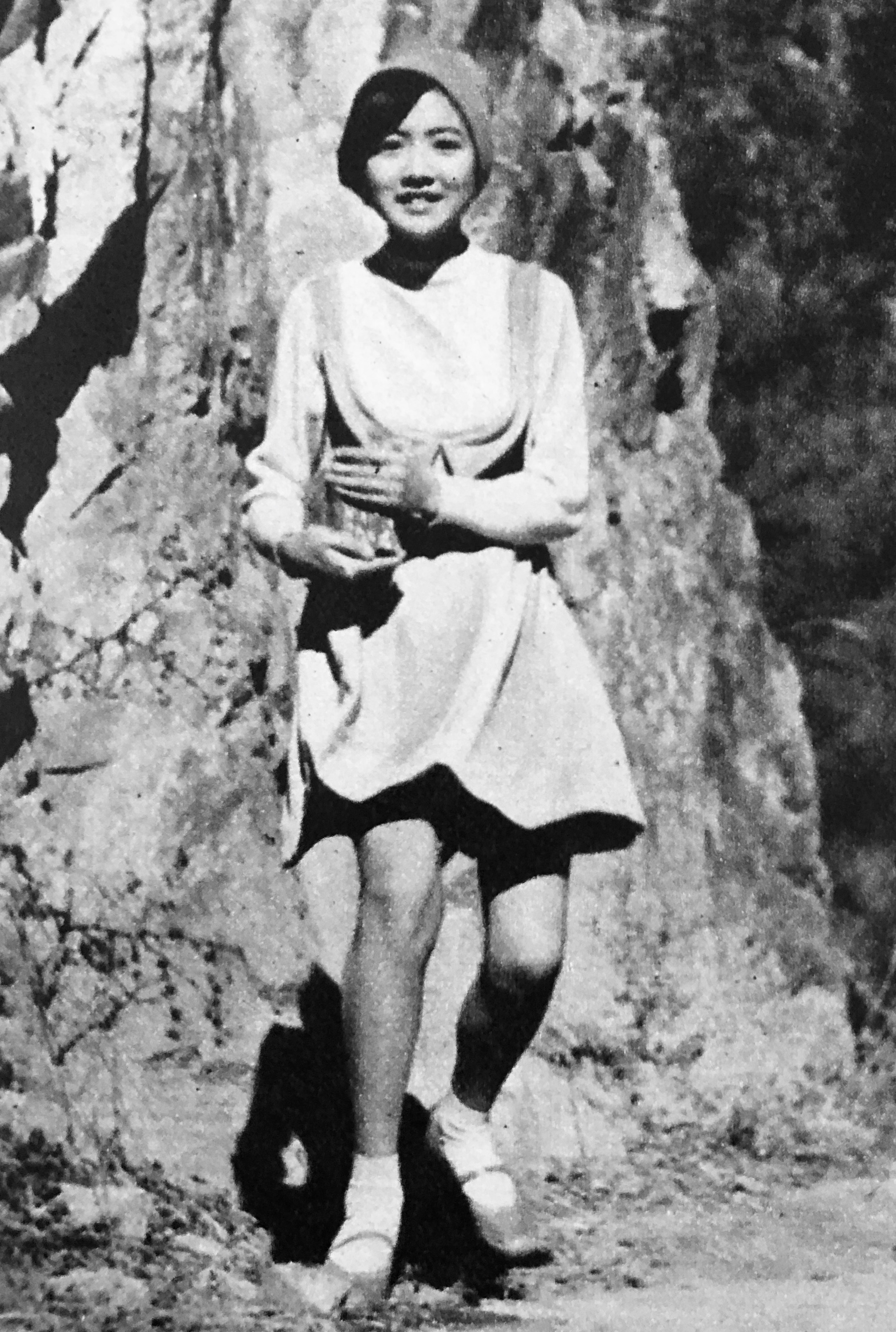
Asaoka in 1955

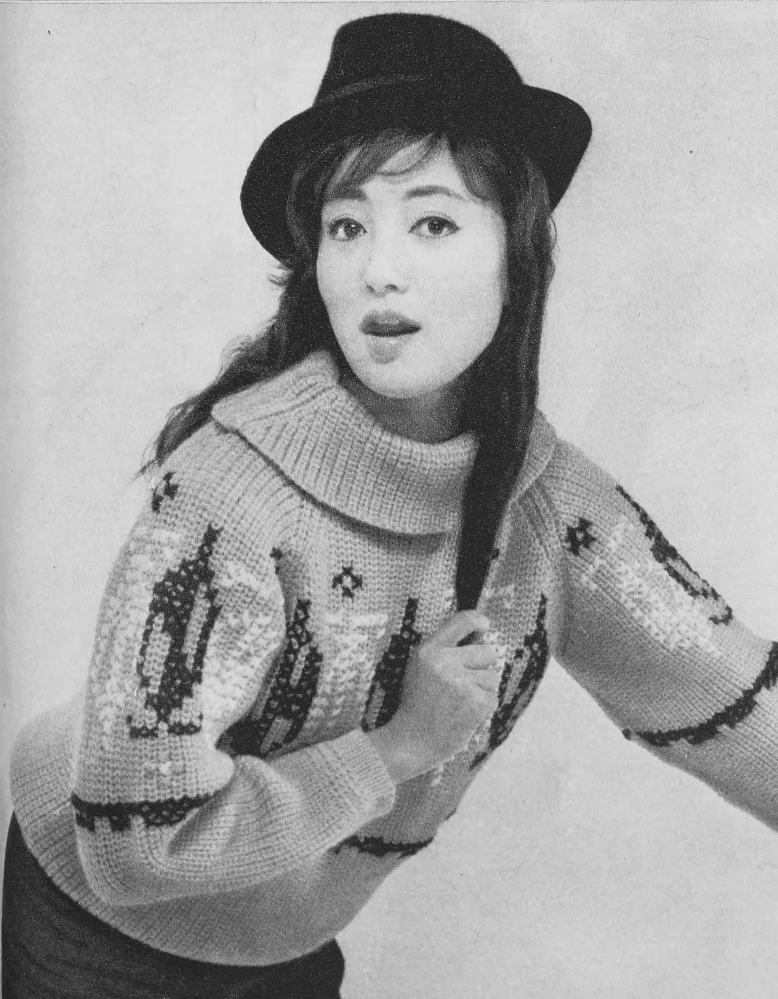
Asaoka in March 1960

Nobuko Asai was born on 2 July 1940 in Xinjing, Manchukuo (Now Changchun) in the northeast part of China, the second of four sisters, Her father, Genjiro Asai, was originally from Tokyo Prefecture in Kanto Region and studied at East Asian Common Document Academy (Now East China Normal University) in Shanghai. After graduating from Chuo University, he joined a Ministry of Finance and served as a secretary to a Japanese Minister of Economic Affairs (Now Japanese Ministry of Economy, Trade and Industry) of Manchukuo before he being sent to Bangkok, Thailand, as a Japanese imperial military officer in 1943. After Asia-Pacific War in World War II, her family was interned at Bang Bua Thong internment camp on Chao Phraya River. By one year later, in 1946, the repatriation began. However, the ship had departed first, which giving a priority to military personnel, sank, and her family escaped death. Eventually, they sought refuge with relatives living near Ōarai Port, and soon, they moved into a repatriation dormitory in Tateyama, Toyama Prefecture. When Nobuko was in the third grade of elementary school, her father obtained a job as a secretary to a member of Japanese parliament, and her family settled in a rented house in Kajichō, Tokyo. One of her younger sister's classmates was Yuriko Hoshi. Her family was very poor, but they lived a life in the full of ingenuity, such as her mother cutting and dyeing blankets to make coats.

Her real Japanese name was officially changed into her stage name as Ruriko Asaoka.

In early 1955, while at Chiyoda Ward's Imagawa Junior High School in Tokyo, Asaoka made her acting debut when she was 15, where she appeared in Green Far Away, released in the same year, which was illustrated by Japanese graphic artist Junichi Nakahara (1913–1983).

In 1961, Asaoka served as a member of a Japanese representative for "Beautiful Oriental Goodwill Mission", which became as a trip around the world and a campaign for international goodwill. She was a representative heroine in Nikkatsu action films during the heyday of Japanese film and TV industry, and played as an heroine in many films, including three major action series starring with Akira Kobayashi: The Wandering Guitarist (1959), The Guitarist from the Sea (1960), and Love in Ginza (1962), as well as three mood action series, including Red Handkerchief and Sunset Hill (both in 1964) and A Warm Misty Night (1967) with Yujiro Ishihara, the oldest brother of former Tokyo Prefectural Governor and hawkish writer Shintaro Ishihara.

In 1964, Asaoka appeared in numerous films as a leading actress for Nikkatsu, such as Gate of Flesh, Ten Years of Tragic Love, and Theater of Life. For the first time since 1955, she asserted herself as an actress, and began to bring in her own projects. Her acting rate was slowed between 1964 and 1966. Prior to took her three-year-period, she continued to appeared in many numerous films and TV shows in late 1960s and 1970s, such as Thirst for Love (1967), Toho's The Man Among Men in Japan (1968), Goyokin (1969), Machibuse (1970), Men and War (1970–1973), To Love Again (1971), and Zatoichi (1972) with Shintaro Katsu.

Asaoka remained a popular figure well as an actress during early 1970s, appearing in films and TV series for a variety of studios, and occasionally tackling the medium of television. She continued to be featured on magazine covers and in fashion layouts, but with greatly reduced frequency. Since late 1980s and early 1990s, Asaoka has shifted the focus of her activities to the stage, appearing in works by Kyōka Izumi (1873–1939) and among others. However, she has been making fewer films, turning her acting attentions to the stage, with some degree of success.

Asaoka won Medal with Purple Ribbon (2002) and Order of the Rising Sun, 4th Class, Gold Rays with Rosette (2011), awarded by then-Japanese Emperor Akihito.

In 2014, Asaoka was ranked fourth among Japanese actresses in All-Time Best Japanese Film Actors and Actresses list. In the same year, she co-starred with Akira Kobayashi on stage for the first time in 44 years since 1969 film Hell's Excommunication Letter.

== Personal life ==
She is married to Japanese actor Koji Ishizaka in 1971 after they both appeared in the same TV drama. The couple have no children together. They separated and then amicably divorce on 27 December 2000 after a nearly 30-year marriage due to divergence in lifestyle priorities and Ishizaka's desire to care for his aging mother.

Her height is 1.56 m (5 ft 1 in) and her blood type is A.

== Filmography ==
=== Film ===
- Midori haruka ni (1955)
- Zesshō (1958)
- The Wandering Guitarist (1959)
- Kenju burai-chō Nukiuchino Ryu (1960)
- Danger Pays (1962)
- Alone Across the Pacific (1963)
- Red Handkerchief (1964)
- Thirst for Love (1967)
- Yogiri yo Kon'yamo Arigatō (1967)
- The Man Among Men in Japan (1968)
- Hell's Excommunication Letter (1969)
- Goyokin (1969)
- Machibuse (1970)
- Men and War (1970–73)
- To Love Again (1971)
- Confessions Among Actresses (1971)
- Kage Gari (1972)
- Zatoichi (1972)
- Otoko wa Tsurai yo series (1973–2019) – Lily
- The Professor's Beloved Equation (2006)
- La Campanella (TBA)

=== Television ===
- Sexy Voice and Robo (2007) – Maki Makyouna
- Yasuragi no Sato (2017) – Saeko
- Naotora: The Lady Warlord (2017) – Jukei-ni

== Honors ==
- Kinuyo Tanaka Award (1995)
- Medal with Purple Ribbon (2002)
- Order of the Rising Sun, 4th Class, Gold Rays with Rosette (2011)
