= Ōmiya, Saitama =

Dissolved municipality in Saitama prefecture, Japan

Ōmiya (大宮市, Ōmiya-shi) was a city located in Saitama Prefecture, Japan.

On May 1, 2001, Ōmiya was merged with the cities of Urawa and Yono to create the city of Saitama.

Since April 1, 2003, the area of former Ōmiya City has been divided into 4 wards: Kita-ku, Minuma-ku, Nishi-ku, and Ōmiya-ku of Saitama City.

== History ==
=== Origin and pre-modern history ===
Ōmiya is an indigenous Japanese language word which can be decomposed to Ō (大, kun'yomi (Japanese reading) おお: large, great) and miya (宮, kun'yomi み-や: noble or holy - house; palace or shrine) after the Hikawa Shrine.

The town was on the Nakasendō, a main national road in the feudal Edo period and the predecessor to a part of National Highway Route 17, and the Takasaki Line.

=== Modern Ōmiya ===
- On April 1, 1899, the town of Ōmiya as a modern municipality was founded.
- After the 1923 Great Kantō earthquake, bonsai nurseries relocated from Tokyo and formed the bonsai village.
- In 1940, Ōmiya became a city after several surrounding village annexations/mergers.

=== Saitama City era ===
- On May 1, 2001, Ōmiya was merged with the cities of Urawa and Yono to create the new capital city of Saitama.
- On April 1, 2003, when Saitama became a designated city, the former area of Ōmiya City has been divided into 4 wards: Kita-ku, Minuma-ku, Nishi-ku and Ōmiya-ku.

== Education ==
A North Korean school, Saitama Korean Elementary and Middle School (埼玉朝鮮初中級学校), was previously in the City of Ōmiya.
