= Sōichi Aikawa =

Japanese politician (1942–2021)

- 相川 宗一
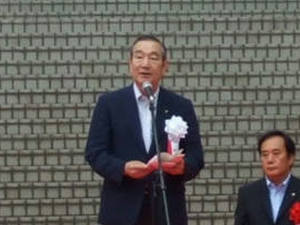
- Aikawa in 2008

Mayor of Saitama
- In office 27 May 2001 – 26 May 2009
- Preceded by: Isamu Ihara (acting)
- Succeeded by: Hayato Shimizu

Mayor of Urawa
- In office 2 May 1991 – 30 April 2001
- Preceded by: Kenkichi Nakagawa
- Succeeded by: Office abolished

Member of the Saitama Prefectural Assembly
- In office 19 October 1980 – 14 April 1991
- Constituency: Urawa City

Personal details
- Born: 13 September 1942 Urawa, Saitama, Japan
- Died: 25 January 2021 (aged 78) Saitama City, Saitama, Japan
- Party: Independent
- Education: Keio University

Sōichi Aikawa (相川 宗一, Aikawa Sōichi; 13 September 1942 – 25 January 2021) was a Japanese politician.

== Biography ==
Aikawa was born in Urawa, Saitama. A graduate of Keio University, he was elected mayor of Urawa in 1991 and served for ten years. On 27 May 2001, he was chosen as the first mayor of the city of Saitama, which was founded on 1 May 2001 through the merger of Urawa and two neighboring cities. He governed Saitama for eight years until he lost to Hayato Shimizu in the mayoral election held in May 2009.

He died of respiratory failure in 2021.

Preceded by Kenkichi Nakagawa	Mayor of Urawa; 1991–2001	City dissolved
Preceded by Isamu Ihara as acting mayor	Mayor of Saitama; 2001–2009	Succeeded by Hayato Shimizu
