= Man Who Causes a Storm =

Man Who Causes a Storm 嵐を呼ぶ男
- Theatrical release poster
- Directed by: Umetsugu Inoue
- Written by: Umetsugu Inoue (writer); Dai Nishijima (writer)
- Starring: Mie Kitahara; Yujiro Ishihara; Izumi Ashikawa; Nobuo Kaneko
- Cinematography: Kazumi Iwasa
- Distributed by: Nikkatsu
- Release date: 29 December 1957
- Running time: 101 minutes
- Country: Japan
- Language: Japanese

Man Who Causes a Storm (Japanese: 嵐を呼ぶ男, Hepburn: Arashi o Yobu Otoko), or A Storming Drummer, or The Stormy Man, is a 1957 color Japanese film directed by Umetsugu Inoue. The film is one of the most famous films for Yujiro Ishihara, who plays the main role of Kokubun Eiji, an unknown drummer. It has been remade twice; first in 1966, directed by Toshio Masuda and starring Tetsuya Watari, and again in 1983, directed by Inoue and starring Masahiko Kondō.

== Cast ==
- Yujiro Ishihara : Kokubun Eiji
- Mie Kitahara : Fukushima Miyako
- Izumi Ashikawa : Shima Midori
- Nobuo Kaneko : Sakyo
- Tatsuya Fuji
- Kyoji Aoyama
- Kaku Takashina
- Mari Shiraki : Merry Oka
- Masumi Okada
- Jūkei Fujioka : Mochinaga
- Kaku Takashina : Ken
