= Yūjirō Ishihara =

Japanese actor and singer (1934–1987)

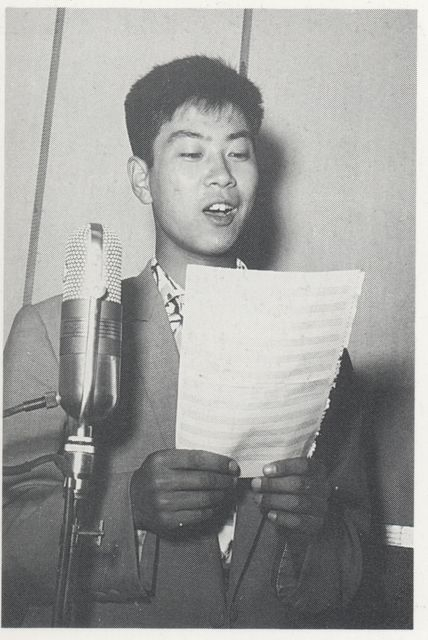
- Ishihara in 1957
- Born: December 28, 1934; Kobe, Japan
- Died: July 17, 1987 (aged 52); Shinjuku, Tokyo, Japan
- Occupations: actor and singer
- Years active: 1956–1982
- Height: 1.83 m (6 ft 0 in)
- Spouse: Mie Kitahara (m. 1960)

Yūjirō Ishihara (石原 裕次郎, Ishihara Yūjirō; December 28, 1934 – July 17, 1987) was a Japanese actor and singer born in Kobe. His elder brother was Shintaro Ishihara, an author, politician, and the Governor of Tokyo between 1999 and 2012. Yujiro's film debut was the 1956 film Season of the Sun, based on a novel written by his brother. He was beloved by many fans as a representative youth star in the films of postwar Japan and subsequently as a macho movie hero. His early death from liver cancer was a major public event in Japan.

== Life and career ==
Ishihara grew up in Kobe, Otaru, and Zushi. His father, an employee of Mitsui O.S.K. Lines, was from Ehime Prefecture, and his mother was from Miyajima, Hiroshima. Ishihara attended Otaru Fuji Kindergarten and then Otaru City Inaho Elementary School. During his elementary school years he participated in competitive swimming and skied on Mt. Tengu. He then attended Zushi City Zushi junior High School, where he began playing basketball. He aimed to enter Keio Senior High School, but did not pass the entrance examination. He enrolled at Keio Shiki Senior High School, but in 1951 was admitted to Keio Senior High School. Afterward he entered the political science department of the school of law at Keio University, associated with the high school, but reportedly spent all his time playing around.

Wanting to become an actor, he auditioned at Toho, Daiei Film and Nikkatsu, but did not pass any of his auditions. However, in 1956, with help from producer Takiko Mizunoe and his brother Shintaro, he received a bit-part in the film adaptation of Shintaro's Akutagawa Prize-winning Season of the Sun, making his film debut. Afterwards he withdrew from Keio University to work for Nikkatsu, playing the lead in the film adaptation of Shintaro's novel Crazed Fruit.

At the 1958 Blue Ribbon Awards Ishihara won the prize for best new actor for the 1957 films Washi to taka and Man Who Causes a Storm. He would go on to become one of the representative stars of the Showa Era with his twin acting and singing career, but his life was one made harder by illness and injury.

In 1960 he married actress Mie Kitahara, his co-star in a number of films beginning in 1956 with Crazed Fruit.

Ishihara, together with Akira Kobayashi, was the main male star at Nikkatsu at the time of Nikkatsu's move into the Roman Porno soft porn market. Yūjirō founded Ishihara Promotion in order to make regular films. Kurobe's Sun, which he produced, was a great success, but other movies he produced failed and he was forced to appear in television dramas to make ends meet.

Ishihara survived an oral cancer of the tongue in 1978, and an aortic aneurysm in 1981, supported by friends, family, and his legion of fans. However he was later diagnosed with liver cancer and died at Keio University Hospital on July 17, 1987 at 4:26 a.m. He was 52 years old. His final appearance as an actor was in the final episode of popular detective television drama Taiyō ni Hoero! In Taiyō ni Hoero! Ishihara had played the role of Shunsuke Todō for 14 years and gained new popularity.

Throughout his life Ishihara abused alcohol and tobacco, and ate meals that were lacking in vegetables; this unhealthy lifestyle is generally acknowledged as contributing to his early death.

== Legacy and memorials ==
Yujiro Ishihara was called a Japanese Elvis Presley and his films and music are still followed by lovers of the Shōwa period. On the anniversary of his death, July 17, his mourning ceremony is often rebroadcast on television.

His grave is a granite gorintō, at Sōji-ji temple in Tsurumi, Yokohama, Kanagawa. A memorial museum opened on June 21, 1991, in Otaru, Hokkaido.

In 1996 his older brother, Shintaro, published a biography, Otōto (弟), (Younger Brother), that won the Mainichi Bungakusho Special Prize and became the basis of a drama broadcast by TV Asahi in 2004.

His image features on a 1997 Japanese postage stamp.

== Selected filmography ==
- Gesshoku (1956)
- Season of the Sun (太陽の季節, Taiyō no Kisetsu, 1956) - Mr. Izu (supporting role)
- Crazed Fruit (狂った果実, Kurutta kajitsu, 1956) - Takishima Natsuhisa
- The Baby Carriage (乳母車, Ubaguruma, 1956) - Muneo Aizawa
- Chitei no Uta (地底の歌, 1956) - Fuyu, the Diamond
- Ningen gyorai shutsugekisu (1956)
- Jazz musume tanjō (ジャズ娘誕生 Jazu musume tanjō, 1957) - Haruo Nanjô
- This Day's Life (今日のいのち Kyo no inochi, 1957)
- Sun in the Last Days of the Shogunate (幕末太陽伝 Bakumatsu taiyōden, 1957) - Takasugi Shinsaku
- Washi to taka (1957) - Senkichi
- I Am Waiting (俺は待ってるぜ Ore wa matteru ze, 1957) - Jôji Shimaki
- Man Who Causes a Storm (嵐を呼ぶ男 Arashi o yobu otoko, aka A Storming Drummer, 1957) - Shoichi Kokubu
- Shorisha (1957)
- Subarashiki dansei (1958)
- Yoru no kiba (literally "Fang of the Night") (1958) - Kenkichi Sugiura
- Rusty Knife (錆びたナイフ Sabita naifu, 1958) - Yukihiko Tachibana
- A Slope in the Sun (陽のあたる坂道 Hi no ataru sakamichi, 1958) - Shinji Tashiro
- Fūsoku 40 metres (風速40米 Fūsoku yonjū mētoru, 1958)
- Red Quay (赤い波止場 Akai Hatoba, 1958) - Jirô Tominaga
- Kurenai no tsubasa (1958)
- Ashita wa Ashita no Kaze ga Fuku (1958)
- Arashi no naka o tsuppashire (1958)
- Wakai Kawa no Nagare (1959) - Kensuke Sone
- Sekai o kakeru Koi (1959) - Yûji Muraoka
- Tôgyû ni kakeru otoko (1960) - Tôu Kitami
- Aitsu to watashi (1961) - Saburo Kurokawa
- Dôdôtaru jinsei (1961) - Shûhei Nakabe
- Arabu no Arashi (1961) - Shintaro Munakata
- Ginza no koi no Monogatari (1962) - Jirô Ban
- Nikui An-chikushô (1962) - Daisaku Kita
- Zerosen Kurokumo Ikka (1962)
- Wakai Hito (1962) - Shintarô Masaki
- Hana to Ryu (1962)
- Alone on the Pacific aka Alone Across the Pacific (太平洋ひとりぼっち Taiheiyo hitori-botchi, 1963) - The Youth
- Red Handkerchief (1964)
- Tekkaba Yaburi (1964)
- Kuroi Kaikyo (1964) - Akio Maki
- Taking The Castle (1965) - Tozo Kuruma
- Those Magnificent Men in Their Flying Machines (1965) - Yamamoto
- Seishun to wa nanda (1965) - Kensuke Nonomura
- Nakaseruze (1965)
- Yogiri yo Kon'yamo Arigatō (1967) - Tôru Sagara
- Hatoba no taka (1967) - Keinichi Kusumi
- Kimi wa koibito (1967) - Ishizaki - director
- Kurobe's Sun (黒部の太陽; Kurobe no Taiyō, 1968) - Iwaoka
- Wasureru Monoka (1968)
- Samurai Banners (風林火山; Fūrin Kazan, 1969) - Kenshin Uesugi
- Eiko e no 5,000 kiro (1969)
- Hitokiri (1969) - Ryoma Sakamoto
- Arashi no yushatachi (1969) - Shimaji
- Fuji sanchō (1970) - Gorō Umehara
- Machibuse (1970) - Yataro
- Aru heishi no kake (1970) - Hiroshi Kitabayashi
- Men and War Part I (1970) - Shinozaki
- A Man′s World (1971) - Tadao Konno
- Yomigaeru daichi (1971) - Kazuya uematsu
- Kage Gari Hoero taiho (1972) - Jubei Muroto
- Kage Gari (1972) - Jubei Muroto
- Tōga (1978) - (Special appearance)
- Arcadia of My Youth (わが青春のアルカディア Waga Seishun no Arcadia, 1982) - Phantom F. Harlock I (voice) (final film role)

== TV drama ==
- Taiyō ni Hoero! (太陽にほえろ!) (1972-1986) - Shunsuke Tōdō (Boss)
- Daitokai Series (大都会) (1976-1978) - Gōro Munakata / Ryuta Takigawa
- Haguregumo (浮浪雲) (1978)
- Seibu Keisatsu (西部警察) (1979–84) - Kogure

== Discography ==
=== Hit songs ===
- Arashi wo Yobu Otoko (1958)
- Ginza no Koi no Monogatari (銀座の恋の物語) (1961)
- Red handkerchief (1962)
- Futari no Sekai (1965)
- Yogiri yo Konyamo Arigatou (1967)
- Brandy Glass (ブランデー グラス) (1977)
- Waga Jinsei ni Kuiwanai (1987)
- Kita no Tabibito (1987)
