= Yumeji Tsukioka =

Japanese actress (1922–2017)

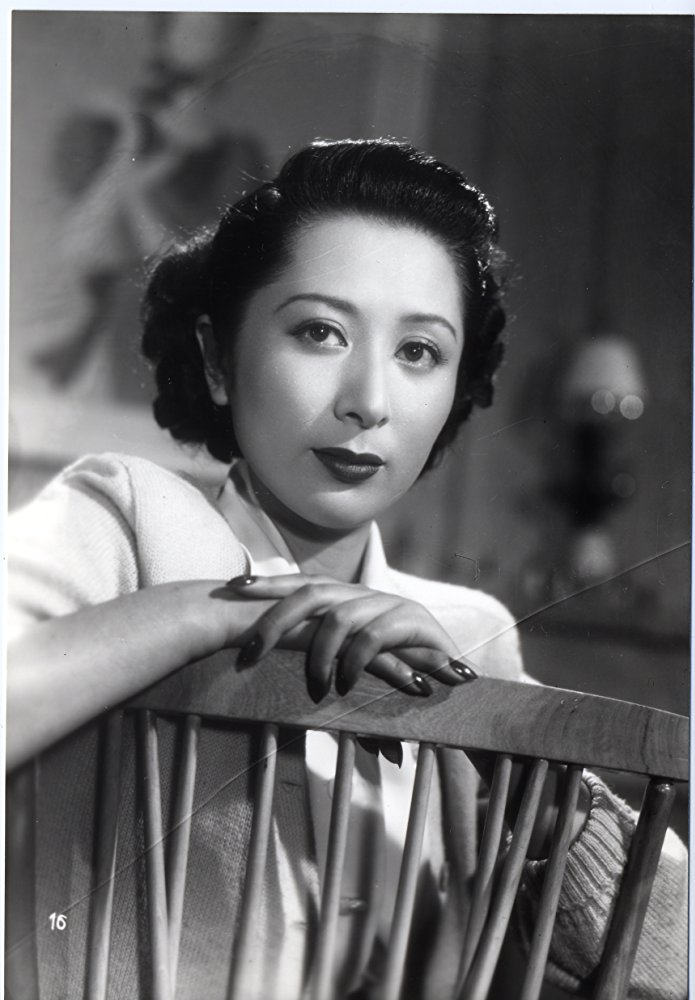
- Born: Akiko Hinotsume; 14 October 1922; Hiroshima, Japan
- Died: 3 May 2017 (aged 94); Tokyo, Japan
- Other name: Akiko Inoue
- Occupation: Actor
- Years active: 1940–1994

Yumeji Tsukioka (月丘夢路, Tsukioka Yumeji; born Akiko Hinotsume, 14 October 1922 – 3 May 2017) was a Japanese film actress. She appeared in more than 150 films between 1940 and 1994, including works by Yasujirō Ozu, Keisuke Kinoshita, Kinuyo Tanaka and others.

She was married to the director Umetsugu Inoue from 1957 until his death in 2010.

== Selected filmography ==
- Late Spring (1949)
- The Bells of Nagasaki (1950)
- Hiroshima (1953)
- Ojōsan shachō (1953)
- Twenty-Four Eyes (1954)
- A Hole of My Own Making (1955)
- The Eternal Breasts (1955)
- The Temptress and the Monk (1958)
- Love Under the Crucifix (1962)
- Karei-naru Ichizoku (1974)
