= Yono, Saitama =

City in Saitama, Japan

Yono (与野市, Yono-shi) was a city located in Saitama Prefecture, Japan.

On May 1, 2001, Yono was merged with the cities of Urawa and Ōmiya to create the city of Saitama.

Since April 1, 2003, the area of former Yono City is only consisted of Chūō-ku of Saitama City.

== History ==
=== Modern Yono ===
- On April 1, 1889, the town of Yono was founded.
- On July 15, 1958, Yono became a city, which existed between cities of Urawa and Ōmiya.

=== Saitama city era ===
- On May 1, 2001, Yono was merged with the cities Urawa and Ōmiya to create the new capital city of Saitama.
- On April 1, 2003, when Saitama became a designated city, the former area of Yono city became known as Chūō-ku, along with small parts of former Urawa and Ōmiya cities.

== Things of Interest ==
Yono City was the birthplace of former Kawasaki Frontale and current RC Strasbourg goalkeeper Eiji Kawashima. Saitama New Urban Center Station is west of Utsunomiya Line.
