= Mie Kitahara =

Japanese actress (born 1933)

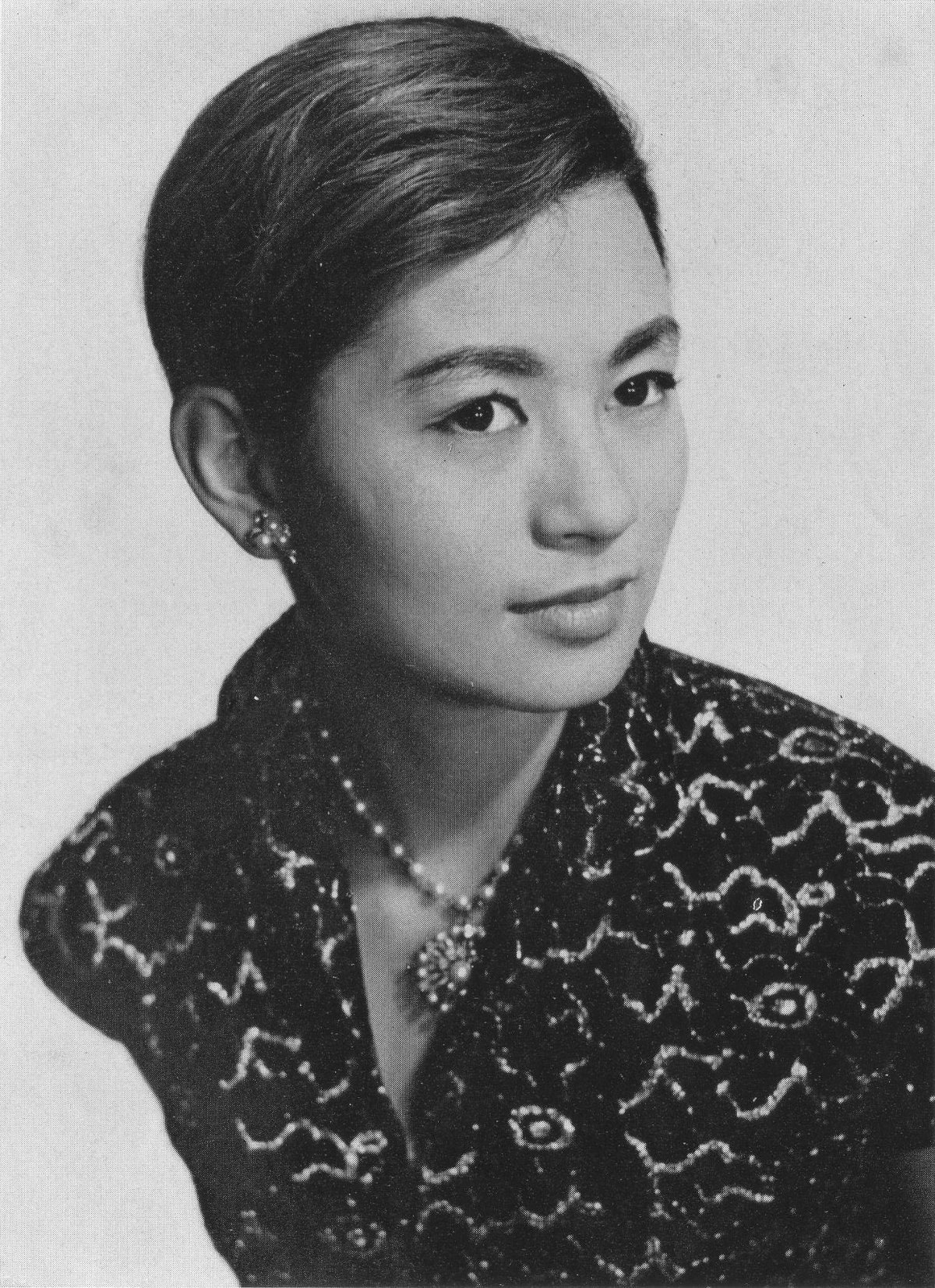
- Mie Kitahara in 1955
- Born: 23 July 1933 (age 92); Meguro, Tokyo, Japan
- Occupation: Actress
- Years active: 1952–1960
- Spouse: Yūjirō Ishihara (m. 1960; died 1987)

Mie Kitahara (北原三枝, Kitahara Mie; born 23 July 1933) is a Japanese actress who appeared in more than 60 films between 1952 and 1960.

== Biography ==
Born in Meguro, Tokyo, Kitahara gave her screen debut in Keisuke Kinoshita's 1952 Carmen's Pure Love. In 1954, she moved from the Shochiku film studios to Nikkatsu. She is best known for co-starring in a series of films with Yūjirō Ishihara, starting with Crazed Fruit in 1956. They married in 1960 and she retired from acting, assuming her married name, Makiko Ishihara (石原まき子).

== Selected filmography ==
- A Hole of My Own Making (1955)
- Midori haruka ni (1955)
- The Moon Has Risen (1955)
- The Balloon (1956)
- Ryūri no Kishi (1956)
- Crazed Fruit (1956)
- This Day's Life (1957)
- I Am Waiting (1957)
- Man Who Causes a Storm (1957)
- A Slope in the Sun (1958)
- Fūsoku 40 metres (1958)
- Subarashiki dansei (1958)
