= Urawa, Saitama =

Place in Japan

Coordinates: 35°52′N 139°39′E

Urawa (浦和市, Urawa-shi) was a city located in Saitama Prefecture, Japan. On May 1, 2001, Urawa was merged with the cities of Ōmiya and Yono to create the city of Saitama. Since April 1, 2003, the area of former Urawa City has been divided into 4 wards: Urawa-ku, Midori-ku, Minami-ku and Sakura-ku of Saitama City. The city hall and the prefectural government building are located in Urawa-ku.

== History ==
=== Origin and pre-modern history ===
In the Edo period, the area that became Urawa flourished as a posting station of the Nakasendō, a highway connecting Edo (modern-day Tokyo) and Kyoto. But it was not as big a town as Iwatsuki, which was the only castle town in the area of the modern-day city of Saitama.

=== Modern Urawa ===
- In 1869, the Prefectural Government of Urawa Prefecture was set up, and the Government's Office was located in Urawa.
- In 1871, Iwatsuki, Urawa, and Oshi Prefectures merged to form Saitama Prefecture, and Urawa became the capital of this new Prefecture.
- The 1923 Great Kantō earthquake heavily damaged Tokyo and many nearby cities. Although Urawa is not far from Tokyo, it suffered less damage than Tokyo, Yokohama, and other cities in Kantō region, so many intellectuals, especially painters, moved to Urawa, and this old posting station started to change into a modern city.
- Several neighboring villages then merged into Urawa, and in 1934, Urawa became a city.

=== Saitama City era ===
- On May 1, 2001, Urawa was merged with the cities of Ōmiya and Yono to create the new capital city of Saitama. At that time, the city had a population of 488,000.
- On April 1, 2003, when Saitama became a designated city, the former area of Urawa City has been divided into 4 wards: Urawa-ku, Midori-ku, Minami-ku and Sakura-ku.
