= Kirio Urayama =

Japanese film director (1930–1985)

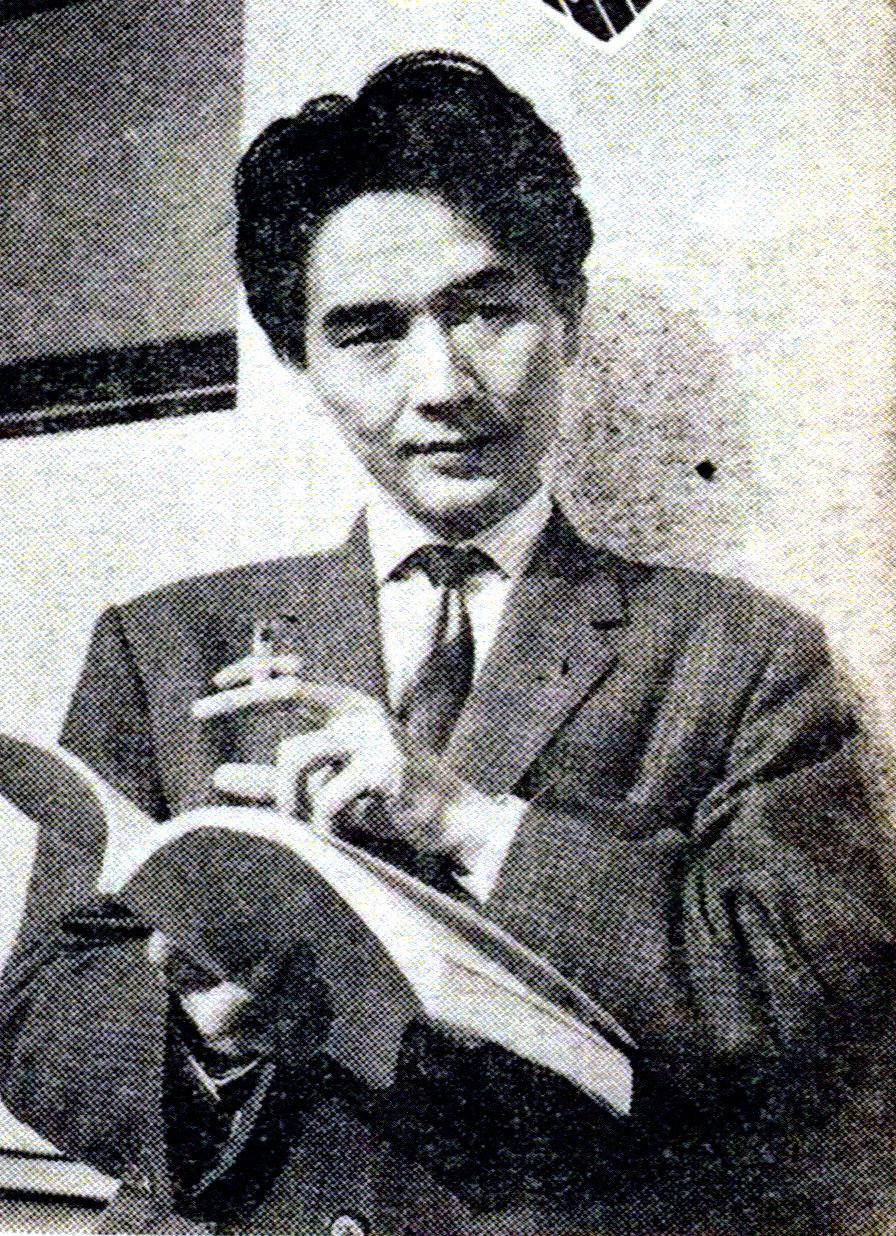
- Born: 14 December 1930; Hyōgo Prefecture, Japan
- Died: 20 October 1985 (aged 54)
- Occupations: Film director, screenwriter
- Years active: 1956-1985

Kirio Urayama (浦山 桐郎, Urayama Kirio; 14 December 1930 – 20 October 1985) was a Japanese film director and screenwriter.

== Career ==
Born in Hyōgo Prefecture, Urayama graduated from Nagoya University before joining the Nikkatsu studio in 1954. After working as an assistant director to Akinori Matsuo, Yūzō Kawashima and Shohei Imamura, he debuted as a director with Foundry Town in 1962, a film that depicted the life of Zainichi Korean residents of Japan. It helped establish Sayuri Yoshinaga as a major actress (she would collaborate with Urayama several times, including on his final film Yumechiyo's Diary). Urayama won the Directors Guild of Japan New Directors Award for Foundry Town. His 1963 film Bad Girl (also known as Each day I cry) was entered into the 3rd Moscow International Film Festival where it won a Golden Prize.

He directed a total of eleven films before his death in 1985 of acute heart failure.

== Filmography ==
=== Screenwriter ===
- Victory Is Mine (1956, co-writer)
- Ojôsan no sampomichi (1960, co-writer)
- Tōkyō no otenba musume (1961, co-writer)
- Ningen no sabaku (1990, posthumous)

=== Assistant director ===
- Burden of Love (1955, second assistant director)
- Ai no onimotsu (1955)
- Stolen Desire (1958)
- Nishi Ginza Station (1958)
- Endless Desire (1958)
- Abashiri bangaichi (1959)
- I Will Challenge (1959)
- My Second Brother (1959)
- Wakai hyou no mure (1959)
- Yami ni hikaru me (1960)
- Yami o saku kuchibue (1960)
- Pigs and Battleships (1961)

=== Director ===
- Foundry Town (キューポラのある街 Kyūpora no aru machi, 1962)
- Bad Girl, aka Delinquent Girl, aka Each Day I Cry (非行少女 Hiko shōjo, 1963)
- The Girl I Abandoned (私が棄てた女 Watashi ga suteta onna, 1969)
- The Gate of Youth (青春の門 Seishun no mon, 1975)
- The Gate of Youth: Part 2, aka The Gate of Youth: Independence Chapter (青春の門: 自立篇 Seishun no mon: Jiritsu hen, 1977)
- The Baseball Trained Warriors Practice, aka Baseball: The Hard-Trained Heroes – Practice Edition (ザ・ベースボール 鍛え抜かれた勇者たち 練習編, 1978) – Documentary about the Hankyu Braves.
- Taro the Dragon Boy (龍の子太郎 Tatsu no ko Tarō, 1979)
- Child of the Sun (太陽の子 てだのふあ Taiyo no ko teda no fua, 1980)
- Dark Room (暗室 Anshitsu, 1983)
- Friends Love (ふれんず・らぶ Furenzu labu, 1985) – V-Cinema film.
- Yumechiyo's Diary, aka The Diary of Yumechiyo, aka Yume-Chiyo (夢千代日記 Yumechiyo nikki, 1985)

=== Television ===
- Hunger Straits (飢餓海峡, 1978) – Episodes 1, 2, 5, 6 and 8. Adapted from the novel Kiga Kaikyō by Tsutomu Mizukami, which also inspired A Fugitive from the Past.
- One Year, aka Year One Class (一年一組, 1979) – Made-for-TV documentary.
