= Toshio Takahara =

Japanese actor (1927–2000)

- Born: 1 May 1923; Tokyo, Japan
- Died: 26 February 2000 (aged 76)
- Occupation: Actor
- Years active: 1943–2000

Toshio Takahara (高原 駿雄, Takahara Toshio; 1 May 1927 – 26 February 2000) was a Japanese actor. Notable film appearances were Seven Samurai and Twenty-Four Eyes. He is also known for his role as Commander Gonpachi Edogawa in the tokusatsu superhero series Himitsu Sentai Gorenger.

He started his acting career at the Bungakuza theatre company in 1941. In 1943, he made his stage debut with Denen . He gave his film debut with Ginza no Odoriko in 1950. Takahara signed his contract with Nikkatsu studio between 1956 and 1960 and starred in many Nikatsu films, including Sun in the Last Days of the Shogunate directed by Yūzō Kawashima and Pigs and Battleships directed by Shōhei Imamura. He died of heart failure on 26 February 2000.

== Filmography ==
=== Films ===
- Ginza no Odoriko (1950) as Rickshaw man
- Listen to the Voices of the Sea (1950) as combat medic
- Kaizoku-sen (1950) as Gyuhi
- Hino hate (1954)
- Taiyō no nai Machi (1954) as young man
- Seven Samurai (1954) as Samurai with Gun
- Okuman chōja (1954)
- Twenty-Four Eyes (1954) as Chiririn'ya
- Ningen Gyorai Kaiten (1955) as Kawamura
- Sun in the Last Days of the Shogunate (1957) as Kaneji
- Stolen Desire (1958) as Eisuke Katō
- Rusty Knife (1958) as detective Takaishi
- Naked Sun (1958) as Kenzō Sakiyama
- Voice Without a Shadow (1958) as Shigeo Kotani
- My Second Brother (1959) as shop assistant
- Pigs and Battleships (1961) as Doctor Miyaguchi
- Man with a Shotgun (1961) as Okumura
- The Jet That Flew Into the Storm (1961)
- Blood Red Water in the Channel (1961) as Hikawa
- Bad Girl (1963) as Takeda
- Shiroi Kyotō (1966) as Tsukuda
- Men and War (1971)
- Karei-naru Ichizoku (1974) as Tsunoda
- Himitsu Sentai Gorenger as Gonpachi Edogawa
- Niji wo Tsukamu Otoko (1996)
- Tokyo Lullaby (1997)
- Natsu Shōjo (produced in 1996, released in 2019)

=== Television ===
- Return of Ultraman (1972) (ep.45) as Teacher Hamamura
- Kogarashi Monjirō (1972) (ep.10) as Heikichi
- Oshizamurai Kiichihōgan (1973) (ep.11) as Sakamoto Denemon
- The Water Margin (1974) (ep.15)
- Lone Wolf and Cub (1974) (2nd Season ep.2) as Harada Kazuemon
- Taiyō ni Hoero! (1974) (ep.77), (1977) (ep.266) as Gōda, (1978) (ep.301) as Saitō, (1979) (ep.341) as Toda, (1980) (ep.393) as Kazuhiko Kawakami, (1981) (ep.452)
- Himitsu Sentai Gorenger (1975–77) as Commander Gonpachi Edogawa
- G-Men '75 (1978) (ep.161) as Nishi, (1979) (ep.199) as Kinugasa
- The Yagyu Conspiracy (1978)
- Shin Zatoichi (1979) (3rd season ep.6)
- Ōedo Sōsamō (1979) (ep.386) as Jyoshuya, (1980) (ep.428) as Eichibei
- Shin Edo no Kaze (1980) (ep.15) as Tokuei
- Denshi Sentai Denjiman (1981) (ep.31)
- Sanada Taiheiki (1985) as Nagai
- Shūchakueki Series Ao no Jūjika (1994)
- Onihei Hankachō (1995) (ep.4) as Isaburō
