= Decoy (disambiguation) =

A decoy is a person, device, or event meant to distract.

Decoy or Decoys may also refer to:

== Arts and entertainment ==
=== Film ===
- Decoy (1934 film), a German crime film
- Decoy (1946 film), an American film noir
- Decoy (1995 film), an action film starring Peter Weller
- The Decoy (1916 film), a silent short film directed by William Garwood
- The Decoy (1916 Mutual), a silent film directed by George Lederer
- The Decoy (1935 film), adventure film directed by Roger Le Bon and Hans Steinhoff
- The Decoy (2006 film), a western film
- Decoys (film), a 2004 science fiction horror film

=== Television ===
- Decoy (TV series), a 1950s series
- "Decoy" (The Gentle Touch), a 1980 episode
- "Decoy" (Gimme Gimme Gimme), a 2001 episode
- "Decoy" (Justified), a 2013 episode
- "Decoys" (Frasier), a 1999 episode

=== Music ===
- Decoy (album), a 1984 album by Miles Davis
- Decoy (EP), a 1995 EP by Good Riddance
- "Decoy", a song by Paramore

== Ships ==
- HMS Decoy, several British Royal Navy vessels
- USS Decoy, a U.S. Navy schooner
- PS Decoy, a 1986 paddle steamer

== Other uses ==
- Decoy (chess), a tactic in chess
- Decoy cells, virally infected epithelial cells that can be found in urine
- Decoy Heath, Dorset, England
- Decoy Ohtani, a dog owned by Shohei Ohtani

== See also ==
- Duck decoy (disambiguation)
- Miniature Air-Launched Decoy, a decoy missile developed by the United States
