= Yellow Fangs =

1990 Japanese film

- Film poster
- Japanese: リメインズ 美しき勇者たち
- Directed by: Sonny Chiba
- Written by: Shigeko Satō
- Produced by: Yōzō Sakurai; Sonny Chiba; Hiroshi Ishida
- Starring: Hiroyuki Sanada; Mika Muramatsu; Bunta Sugawara
- Cinematography: Saburō Fujiwara
- Edited by: Kōichi Sonoi
- Music by: Kow Otani
- Production companies: Shochiku; Sonny Chiba Enterprise; JTB; Kyoto Eiga
- Distributed by: Shochiku
- Release date: February 10, 1990 (Japan)
- Running time: 107 minutes
- Country: Japan
- Language: Japanese
- Box office: ¥345,000,000 (equivalent to ¥417,650,794 in 2024)

Yellow Fangs (Japanese: リメインズ 美しき勇者たち, Hepburn: Remains: Utsukushiki Yūshatachi; lit. 'Remains: Beautiful Heroes') is a 1990 Japanese disaster film directed by Sonny Chiba. It is the 20th anniversary commemorative work of Japan Action Enterprise and adapts the Sankebetsu brown bear incident in December 1915. The action film stars Hiroyuki Sanada and Mika Muramutsu as childhood friends who hunt down a man-eating bear. Muramatsu won the New Actor Award at the 14th Japan Academy Film Prize for her role in the film.

== Plot ==
In a tough winter of the late Taisho period, villagers at the foot of a mountain in a certain northern country are attacked one after another by bears, and there are many incidents where only women are eaten. The matagi group, coming from a remote mountain village "Eagle Talon" and led by Kasuke, scale the snowy mountain, convinced that it is the work of Akamadara ("Red Spots"), a man-eating bear that once tormented their village and those surrounding it. Akamadara is a bear that lost its food due to the destruction of nature from mining development, so it entered villages and developed a taste for human women, and new damage occurred as development expanded.

Eiji Haiyaku, a member of the group, spots the bear and aims his hunting rifle, but a young woman with a hunting dog finishes the bear off. The bear is not Akamadara. The woman is Eiji's childhood friend, Yuki, who he had not heard from since her parents and younger brother were killed by Akamadara a year ago. Yuki had vowed revenge on the bear, broken the village rule that prohibited women from entering the mountains, disguised herself as a man, and chased Akamadara alone.

While the group was in the mountains, Akamadara had begun attacking the village again. After evacuating the village women, Kasuke decides on the risky strategy of each matagi member hiding in a different spot to ambush the bear. Yuki comes to the hut where Eiji is waiting and tells him to use herself as bait. Akamadara attacked Eiji's hut as Yuki had planned. The two pierced Akamadara with their spears, although they sustained injuries to their hands.

== Cast and characters ==
- Hiroyuki Sanada as Eiji Haiyaku
- Mika Muramatsu as Yuki
- Bunta Sugawara as Kasuke, head of matagi
- Hikaru Kurosaki as Sabu, a member of matagi
- Takeshi Maya as Jiro, a member of matagi
- Satoshi Kurihara as Gohei, a member of matagi
- Isao Natsuyagi (friendship appearance) as Asakichi, Yuki's father
- Etsuko Nami as Atsu, Yuki's mother
- Yōko Minamida as Kiyo, Eiji's mother
- Miki Morita as Mitsu, Kasuke's older sister
- Tomoko Takabe as Yae, Yorozu's wife
- Keizō Kanie as Yorozu
- Hiroyuki Nagato as a Prefectural Assembly member
- Yasushi Suzuki as Officer Kuramochi
- Hiroshi Tanaka as Chief of police
- Other actors: Tokio Seki, Kōji Miemachi, Kōzō Souda, Chū Takatsuki, Ken Mita, Haruki Jō, and Isao Murata
- Child actors: Akihiko Sugiura, Aya Matsushita, Yuta Oka, Yumiko Daimoto, Hayato Konno, Yūichi Yamada, Kenichi Yoshimi, and Takashi Takemoto
- Japan Action Enterprise: Toshimichi Takahashi, Tetsu Masuda, Kiyoshi Inoue, Daigaku Sekine, Shōma Kai, Akira Yamamoto, Kōji Unoki, Takashi Koura, Shingo Nishida, Tetsuya Aoki, Shōgo Shiotani, Koichi Natsuyama, Yoshiyuki Yamaguchi, Kaori Kikuchi, Sawako Kitajima, and Masami Ejiri

== Production ==
Sonny Chiba asked Kinji Fukasaku to direct the film, but Fukasaku encouraged him to direct the work himself, and it became Chiba's first directorial work. In addition to supervising the project, Fukasaku provided logistical support by lending his assistant director and attending filming.

Japan Action Enterprise (JAC) cast Mika Muramatsu as the main heroine, Teru Kurosaki, Takeshi Maya, and Satoshi Kurihara as matagi, and Osamu Kaneda was appointed as the action director. Hiroyuki Sanada, who starred in the film, was also the music director.

Real bears were used in many scenes. In order to create a tense scene where they confront the bear, the actors were filmed inside of a cage made of two layers of 20 mm thick bulletproof glass.

The film was shot on location in the areas of Hokkaido: Niseko, Kimobetsu, Rankoshi, Sōbetsu, Japan Air System, Hotel Sun Palace, Niseko Ikoi Village, Niseko Higashiyama Prince Hotel, Hokkaido Wine, Kyokushinkaikan Takagi Dojo, Showa Shinzan Bear Farm, and Gozaisho Ropeway. At the time of the film's release, JTB offered filming location tours, and a TV commercial was also aired starring Mika Muramatsu as a JTB store staff member and Shinichi Chiba as a visitor.

== TV broadcast ==
This work was first broadcast on TV on Friday January 17, 1992, on the Nippon Television Network's "Friday Road Show".
