= Hiroyuki Nagato =

Japanese actor (1934–2011)

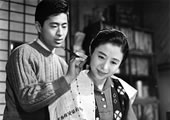
- Nobuko Otowa and Hiroyuki Nagato in the 1956 Japanese movie Gin Shinju
- Born: Akio Kato; 10 January 1934; Kyoto, Japan
- Died: 21 May 2011 (aged 77); Juntendo Clinic, Tokyo, Japan
- Occupation: Actor
- Years active: 1940–2011
- Spouse: Yōko Minamida (m. 1961–2009)
- Parent(s): Kunitarō Sawamura; Tomoko Makino
- Family: Masahiko Tsugawa (brother); Sadako Sawamura (aunt); Daisuke Katō (uncle)

Hiroyuki Nagato (長門裕之, Nagato Hiroyuki; 10 January 1934 – 21 May 2011), stage name of Akio Kato (加藤晃夫), was a Japanese actor.

He starred in Season of the Sun, Endless Desire, My Second Brother, Stolen Desire, and Sukeban Deka, and Yo-Yo Girl Cop.

== Life and career ==
Nagato was born in Kyoto City and came from an illustrious film family. His younger brother Masahiko Tsugawa is an actor. His wife Yōko Minamida was an actress. His grandfather is the director Shōzō Makino, nicknamed the Father of Japanese Film; his father, Kunitarō Sawamura, and his mother, Tomoko Makino, were both actors. His aunt and uncle through his father are the actors Sadako Sawamura and Daisuke Katō. His niece was the actress Mayuko and she referred to him as "Achi" (Uncle Akio). Masayuki Makino, his cousin from his mother's side, was the first principal of the Okinawa Actors School. He had no children with his wife Yoko. He is distantly related to the modern Japanese comedian Daisuke Miyagawa.

After graduating from Hanazono High School, Nagato entered into Ritsumeikan University's Department of Literature but dropped out. Former Hanshin Tigers coach Yoshio Yoshida attended Ritsumeikan at the same time as Nagato but also dropped out.

=== Acting career ===
His first movie appearance was in the 1940 film Zokushi Mizuminato (續清水港). He was a widely known child actor before World War II. During his school years he took a temporary break from acting but after the war he joined the entertainment company Nikkatsu where he resumed film-making. He starred in the first installment book-turned-movie Taiyouzoku series, Season of the Sun, with his co-star, Yujiro Ishihara who debuted with this movie. Combined with director Shohei Imamura, the movie left him with the reputation of having acting and gave him the nickname of "Nikkatsu's Billboard Star".

In 1961 Nagato married Yoko Minamida and the following year he left Nikkatsu. In 1964, together with his wife, he established the film company Ningen Production. In 1968 he produced and starred in the television drama Katsudoya Ichiyo on MBS. However, due to compounding issues with the series, it plunged him 200 million yen into debt.

From 1982 he also became known as a personality appearing on the KBS Kyoto's charity radio show Great Snail War. The show provided help and raise money for children who were orphaned because of accidents. His wife also participated alongside him starting from 1984. He and his wife continued appearing until the campaign's end in 2005.

He also worked together alongside other celebrities born in the same year as him (1934): Yujiro Ishihara, Kinya Aikawa, Koizumi Ohashi, Ichiro Zaitsu, Jiro Sakagami, Shunji Fujimura, Gorō Mutsumi, Shuichiro Moriyama to form the friendship association Showa 9 Nenkai (昭和9年会). The 9th year of the Showa era is the equivalent of 1934.

=== To Yoko Controversy ===
In November 1985, Nagato published an exposé called To Yoko (洋子へ); it was published by the publisher Datahouse (データハウス). It was a series of confessions to his wife, in which he wrote about his numerous infidelities without changing any names of those he had affairs with. It astounded the Japanese media. Junko Ikeuchi, who was among the people included in the book under her real name, voiced a strong objection in response.

Nagato and Datahouse recalled the first edition and issued a revised version in which the problem areas were re-written. Nagato also took out an ad in the Ikeuchi newspaper to apologize over the situation. Nagato argued that, "Because [I] used a ghostwriter, my true intentions were not conveyed." However the entire incident seriously damaged his and his wife's careers. They were forced to resign from all the programs and commercials they had currently appeared in. He went on numerous different celebrity gossip shows for interviews about the event and repeatedly slammed his book against the desk while disparaging it.

After a long time Nagato recovered from the incident and even went back to thriving, performing mainly antagonist or villain roles in television dramas.

=== Last Years ===
In his last years, Nagato devoted himself to making amends with his wife for all his affairs (and the scandal caused by the book) and became her caregiver when she was diagnosed with dementia. At the same time, he also increasingly started co-starring more with his younger brother Tsugawa, who he had been feuding with for many years. He also appeared in works directed by Tsugawa who assumed the name of Makino Masahiko.

On 21 October 2009, Yoko Minamida, died of subarachnoid hemorrhage (SAH) at the age of 76. At a press conference held at the Meiji Theater the day Minamida died, Nagato stated, with tears in his eyes, "From now on, I will step into a world without my wife. Yoko lives on in my memories. This is what eternity means. [...] These four years of caring for her has been my rebirth and has changed my outlook on life."

=== Death ===
After his wife's death, Nagato continued working until right before his own final days. On 21 May 2011, one year and seven months after the death of his wife, Nagato died at Juntendo Clinic in Tokyo at 5:20 pm. He was 77. That night, Tsukawa stated that his brother's condition was "A complication caused by pneumonia, but he was fine the day before", and revealed that his condition had changed suddenly the day of his death. Tsugawa along with Nagato's private friend of 60 years Ruriko Asaoka, rushed to respond to the press media's coverage.
Upon receiving Nagato's obituary, Enzo Tachibana, who had been close to Nagato for many years and a member of the Showa 9 Nenkai, announced his condolences saying, "(With the death of Hiroshi Tamaki and Sakagami) more and more friends are now gone." Others who had a friendly relationship with Nagato commended their own condolences. Aimi Higa, who co-starred with him in DonDon Hare, wrote a comment on her blog in memory of Nagato. Toshiyuki Nishida, who co-starred with him in Ikenaka Genta 80 Kg, said that the titular character "weeps" for his death. Kinichi Hagimoto, who was long loved by Nagato and his wife like a younger brother, when paying his own condolences and choked up with grief said, "He was the ultimate mentor, friend, and brother."

The wake and funeral service were held on 24 May at Zenpukuji in Minato-ku, Tokyo, with Tsugawa serving as the funeral officiant. The body was then cremated at the Kirigaya Yasaijyou in Shinagawa-ku, Tokyo. Kiichi Nakai and Takashi Sasano read the condolences at wake while Tetsuko Kuroyagi and Eiji Okuda read the condolences at the funeral and memorial ceremony. Nagato was given the posthumous name, traditional in Buddhist funeral ceremonies, of "Gokugeiin Shijojoaki"(極芸院釋浄晃).

Nagato's last movie appearance was in Aoi Aoi Sora (青い青い空) released on 9 October 2010. His last TV drama appearance was on the last episode of the NHK Saturday drama Onmitu Happyaku Yacho (隠密八百八町) broadcast on 26 March 2011, about two months before his death.

== Filmography ==
=== Films ===
Year	Title	Role	Notes
1940	Seisen aiba fu: Akatsuki ni inoru		
1942	Kogen no Tsuki		
1942	Sumidagawa		
1942	Aikoku no hana		
1945	Hisshôka	Yuichi	
1948	Te o tsunagu kora	Kenji Okumura	
1948	Ankokugai no tenshi		
1951	Oedo go-nin otoko		
1953	Onna kanja himon - Akô rôshi	Chikara Ôishi	
1953	Katame no mao		
1954	Konomura Daikichi	Gorodayu	
1954	Kaiketu taka		part 1, 2
1954	Teruhi kumoruhi (zenpen)		
1956	Shirogane Shinjū	Tamataro	
1956	Aijô	Tarô Nogami	
1956	Season of the Sun	Tatsuya Tsugawa	Lead role
1956	Tonari no yome		
1956	Ningen gyorai shutsugekisu		
1956	Okinawa no Tami	Kôichi Ôta	
1957	Kiken na kankei	Shôichi Shima	
1957	Gekka no wakamusha	Kotarô	
1957	Jûnana-sai no teikô	Eikichi	
1957	Washi to taka	Goro	
1957	Kaietu taka-dainihen honryuu doto na maki		
1957	Judai no wanâ		
1957	Hangyaku sha		
1958	Kokoro to nikutai no tabi	Judge at audition	Uncredited
1958	Stolen Desire	Shinichi Kunida	
1958	Ginza no sabaku	Saburo Shigeta	
1958	Endless Desire	Satoru	
1958	Akai lamp no shûressha		
1958	Yarô to ôgon		
1959	Dai san no shikaku	Ichirô Yoshikawa	
1959	Saijo kishitsu		
1959	Sono kabe o kudake		
1959	Yuganda tsuki	Masao Katsuragi	
1959	My Second Brother	Kiichi Yasumoto, eldest brother	Lead role
1959	Warera no jidai		
1959	Tôboshâ		
1959	Fudôtoku kyôiku kôza	Keiichi Asabuki	
1960	Kizû darakê no ôkite		
1960	Kyanpasu hyakutoban: Yori gakusei yaro to masume tachi		
1960	Kemono no nemuri		
1960	Mikkô zero rain		
1960	The Warped Ones	Kashiwagi	
1960	Jûrokusai	Setsuo Homma	
1961	Pigs and Battleships	Kinta	Lead role
1961	Rokudenashi yarô	Keigo Tsuruki	
1961	Dôdôtaru jinsei	Kosuke Kon'ya	
1961	Sûkettô kagyô		
1962	Hakai	Ginnosuke Tsuchiya	
1962	Akitsu Springs	Shusaku Kawamoto	
1962	Nikui an-chikushô	Ichirô Umetani	
1962	Atariya taisho		Lead role
1962	Ratai	Takasugi	
1962	Ai to shi no katami	Kiyoshi Nozaki	
1962	Yabai koto nara zeni ni naru	Tetsuzô Okita	
1963	Daisan no Akumyo	Osamu	
1963	Twin Sisters of Kyoto'	Hideo Otomo	
1963	Yushu heiya		
1963	Mushukunin-betsuchô	Kojuro	
1963	Irezumi Hantaro		
1963	Haikei tenno heika sama	Munemoto	
1963	Seishun o kaese	Masuo Suda	
1963	Jinsei gekijo: Zoku Hishakaku		
1963	Kekkonshiki Kekkonshiki	Yoshioka	
1963	Hiken	Chojuro	
1963	The Insect Woman	Matsunami	
1964	Zûzûshii yatsu	Seiichi Onoda	
1964	Kakedashi keiji	Shôsuke Nitta	
1964	Hana to dotô		
1964	Haikei sôri daijin sama		
1964	Zoku zûzûshii yatsu	Masaharu Onoda	
1964	Nihon kyôkaku-den		
1964	Nippon paradaisu	Maresuke Kuramoto	
1964	Jinsei gekijo: Shin Hishakaku		
1965	Kaoyaku	Gorô Akita	
1965	Dai Nippon hattariden		
1965	Daikon to ninjin	Kosuki Yamaki	
1965	Buraikan jingi	Tanimura	
1965	Zokû seiun yakuza - ikarî no otoko		
1965	Ninkyo otoko ippiki		
1965; 1967	Nihon Kyokaku-den		part 1-3
1966	Tobenai chinmoku		
1966	Otoko no shôbu		
1966	The Actress vs. the Greedy Sharks		
1966	Ôtoko no kao wa kuri fûda		
1966	Danshun		
1967	Arashi kitari saru		
1967	Ârappoi no ha gômen dazê		
1968	Kigeki meoto zenzai		
1968	Shin Abashiri Bangaichi	Tatô Komatsu	
1969; 1972	Hibotan bakuto		part 1, 2
1969	Zankoku onna rinchi		
1969	Yakuza hijoshi - mushyo kyodai		
1969	Nihon zan kyôsen		
1969	Nihon zankyô-den		
1969	Bakuto mujô		
1970	Onna no keisatsu, Kokusaisen Machiaishitsu	Takijima	
1970	Shôwa zankyô-den		part 1
1972	Kizu darake jinsei furui do de gonzansu		
1972	Junko intai kinen eiga: Kantô hizakura ikka	Shinkichi	
1972	Aa koe naki tomo	Kawase	
1974	Aka chôchin	Middle-aged man	
1974	Virgin Blues	Middle-aged man	
1975	Isho: Shiroi shôjo		
1975	Baajin buruusu		
1977	Jingi to kôsô	Fusajirô Konno	
1977	Proof of the Man	Takeo Odayama (Naomi's husband)	
1977	Hitomi no naka no houmonsha	Eiichiro Komori	
1978	Kumokiri Nizaemon	Kichigorô	
1978	Mahiru nari		
1979	Nutcracker Fantasy	Doctor of Letters	Japanese version, Voice
1980	Chichi yo haha yo!		
1981	Sudachi no toki kyoiku wa shinazu		
1983	Namidabashi		
1983	Hometown	Denroku	
1984	Wangan Doro	Nagasawa	
1986	Katayoku dake no tenshi		
1986	Minami e hashire, umi no michi o!	Detective Kume	
1986	Michi	Boss of the Mizuya clan	
1987	Sukeban Deka The Movie	Director Kurayami / Dark Director	
1987	Hachiko Monogatari	Kiku-san	
1987	Ore wa otokoda! kanketsu-hen		
1988	Sukeban deka: Kazama sanshimai no gyakushû	Dark Director Kurayami	
1988	Tomorrow	Yasuichiro	
1988	Revolver	Ijichi	
1989	Shôgun Iemitsu no ranshin - Gekitotsu	Tagaya Rokubee	
1989	226	Koichi Kido	
1990	Rimeinzu: Utsukushiki yuusha-tachi	Prefectural Assembly Member	
1990	Rônin-gai	Noodleman	
1990	Sawako no koi	Sawako's father	
1992	Onna goroshi abura no jigoku		
1992	Toki Rakujitsu	Dr. Kitasato	
1993	Yearning	Customer	
1995	Nemureru bijo	Fukura	
1996	Gendai ninkyoden	Masuzo Munekata	
2001	Chinpira		
2003	Tegami	Uno	
2003	Yurusarezaru mono		
2003	Yurusarezaru mono		
2003	Gokudô kyôfu dai-gekijô: Gozu		
2003	The Man in White Part 2: Requiem for the Lion		
2004	Onigiri	Tetsu Yamatani	
2004	Izo		
2005	Nezu no ban	Master Kyokaku	
2006	Sukeban deka: Kôdo nêmu = Asamiya Saki	Kurayami Shirei	
2006	Yo-Yo Girl Cop	Kurayami Shirei	
2007	Tenkôsei: Sayonara anata		
2007	Kobuhiroba		
2008	Hotaru no haka	Maichi Kaicho of Mikage	
2008	Jirochô sangokushi	Father of Onikichi	
2008	Dreaming Awake	Kiya Kimuro	Lead role
2008	Asahiyama Zoo Story: Penguins in the Sky	Keisuke Nirasaki	
2009	Puraido	Gonzaburo Hoshino	
2009	Shinjuku Incident	Hara Ooda	
2009	Tokumei joshi-ana: Namino Yôko		
2010	Flowers	Endo	
2010	Aoi aoi sora	Oshou	

=== Television ===
Year	Title	Role	Notes
1983	Tokugawa Ieyasu	Honda Sakuzaemon	Taiga drama
1983	Oshin		Asadora
1984–1986	97th precinct	Ch Insp Kenzo Takimura	
1985–1986	Sanada Taiheiki	Toyotomi Hideyoshi	
1995	Hachidai Shōgun Yoshimune	Tokugawa Mitsukuni	Taiga drama
