= Hideaki Nitani =

Japanese actor

- 二谷 英明
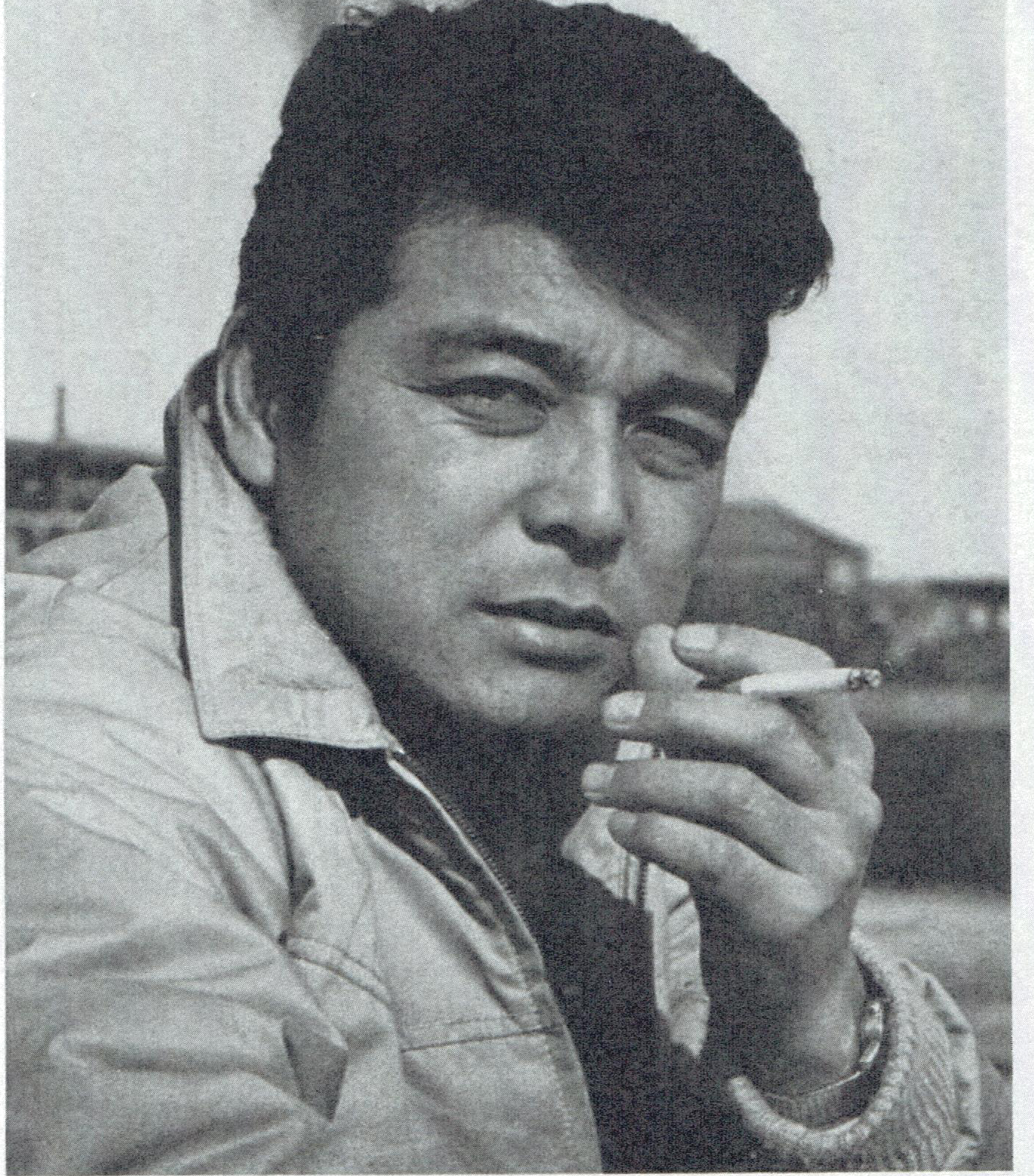
- Hideaki Nitani
- Born: 28 January 1930; Kyoto Prefecture, Japan
- Died: 7 January 2012 (aged 81); Shinjuku, Tokyo, Japan
- Occupation: Actor
- Years active: 1957–1992
- Spouse: Yumi Shirakawa (m. 1964)

Hideaki Nitani (二谷英明, Nitani Hideaki; 28 January 1930 – 7 January 2012) was a Japanese actor.

== Career ==
Born in Kyoto Prefecture, Nitani attended Doshisha University but quit before graduating. He first worked as an announcer at Nagasaki Broadcasting Company, but in 1956 made his debut as an actor at Nikkatsu. Gaining the nickname "Dump Truck Guy" for his handsome, tough guy roles, he soon became a staple in Nikkatsu Action movies, often playing the second lead, but sometimes starring in his own films. He is probably best known abroad for his role in Seijun Suzuki's Tokyo Drifter. Nitani left Nikkatsu in 1971 and moved to television, where he starred in the Tokusō Saizensen police detective series, which ran for ten years between 1977 and 1987.

Nitani married the actress Yumi Shirakawa and their daughter, Yurie Nitani, is also an actress. He died of pneumonia on 7 January 2012, at age 81.

== Selected filmography ==
=== Film ===
- I Am Waiting (1957)
- Sun in the Last Days of the Shogunate (1957)
- Underworld Beauty (1958)
- Voice Without a Shadow (1958)
- Kurenai no Tsubasa (1958)
- Young Breasts (1958)
- My Second Brother (1959)
- Kenju burai-chō Denkō Setsuka no Otoko (1960)
- Man with a Shotgun (1961)
- Red Handkerchief (1964)
- A Chain of Islands (1965)
- Asia-Pol Secret Service (1966)
- Tokyo Drifter (1966)
- Massacre Gun (1967)
- Yogiri yo Kon'yamo Arigatō (1967)
- Retaliation (1968)
- The Sands of Kurobe (1968) as Odagiri
- Men and War Part I (1970)
- Gang Warfare (1972)
- Submersion of Japan (1973)
- Karei-naru Ichizoku (1974)
- Sakura no Kinoshita de (1989)

=== Television ===
- Mighty Jack (1968)
- Tokusō Saizensen (特捜最前線) (1977–1987)
- Nobunaga: King of Zipangu (1992), as Hirate Masahide
