= Izumi Ashikawa =

Japanese actress

- 芦川 いずみ
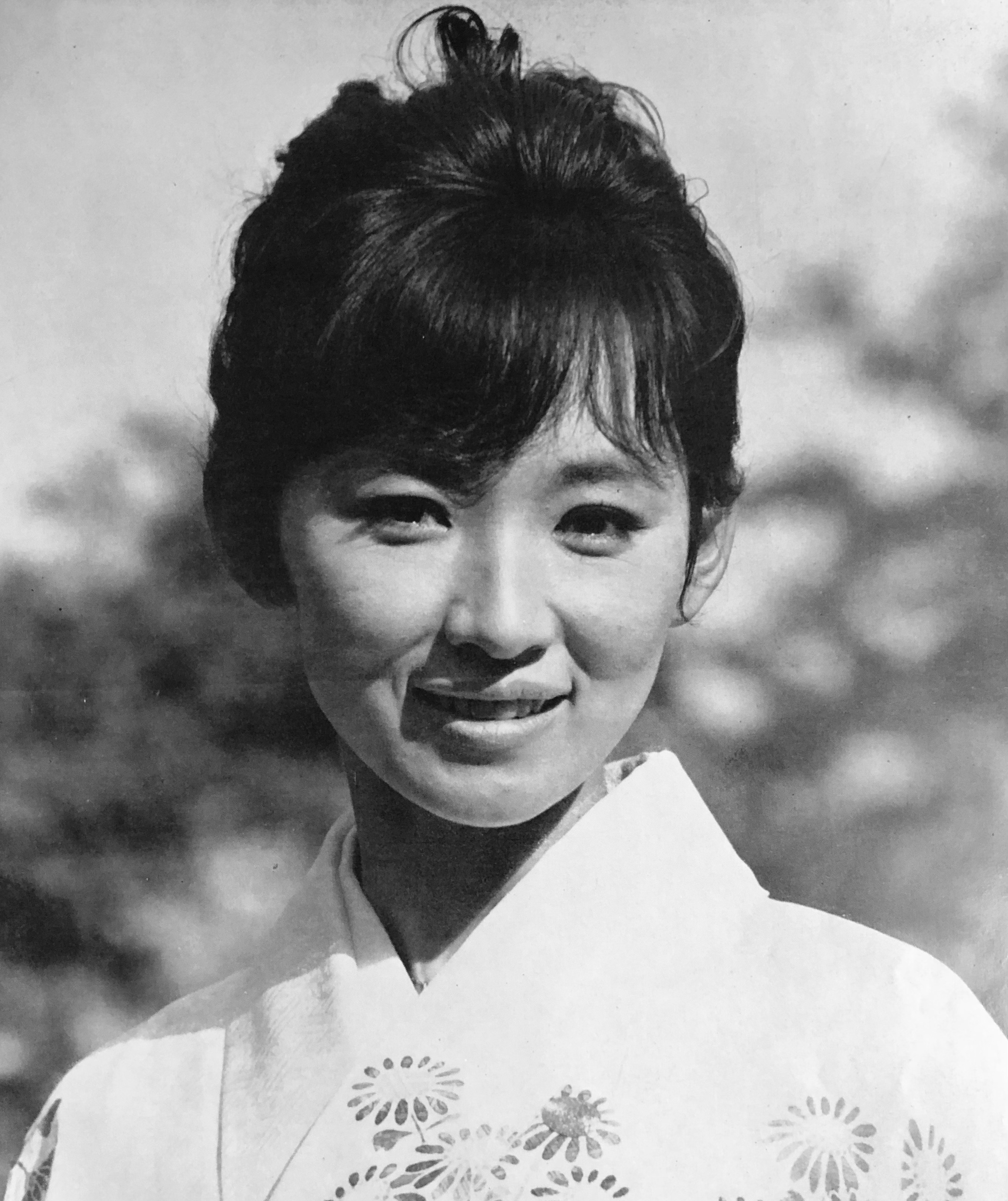
- Ashikawa in 1965
- Born: Sachiko Ito; 6 October 1935 (age 90); Tabata, Kita-ku, Tokyo, Empire of Japan
- Occupation: Actress
- Years active: 1953–68
- Spouse: Tatsuya Fuji (m. 1968)

Sachiko Ito (伊藤佐知子, Itō Sachiko; born 6 October 1935), known professionally as Izumi Ashikawa (芦川 いずみ), is a Japanese actress. Ashikawa was called the Japanese Audrey Hepburn.

In 1953, Ashikawa was scouted by director Yuzo Kawashima and joined the Shochiku studio. She made her film debut with Tokyomadamu to Osakafujin directed by Yuzo Kawashima. In 1955, she moved to the Nikkatsu studio and gained popularity. In 1968, Ashikawa married actor Tatsuya Fuji and retired. She made her final film appearance in the 1968 film Koto no Taiyo.

== Selected filmography ==
- Tokyomadamu to Osakafujin (1953)
- The Baby Carriage (1956)
- The Balloon (1956)
- Sun in the Last Days of the Shogunate (1957)
- Suzaki Paradise: Akashingō (1957)
- Man Who Causes a Storm (1957)
- The Perfect Game (1958)
- Kurenai no Tsubasa (1958)
- A Slope in the Sun (1959)
- Mutekiga Ore o Yondeiru (1960)
- Man with a Shotgun (1961)
- Living by Karate (1961)
- Glass-hearted Johnny (1962)
- A Chain of Islands (1965)
- Outlaw:Gangster VIP 2 (1968)
- Koto no Taiyo (1968)
