= Voice Without a Shadow =

- Japanese movie poster
- Directed by: Seijun Suzuki
- Written by: Ryuta Akimoto; Kan Saji; Seichō Matsumoto (Novel)
- Produced by: Kaneo Iwai
- Starring: Hideaki Nitani; Yōko Minamida; Toshio Takahara; Joe Shishido
- Cinematography: Kazue Nagatsuka
- Edited by: Akira Suzuki
- Music by: Hikaru Hayashi
- Distributed by: Nikkatsu
- Release date: October 22, 1958
- Running time: 92 minutes
- Country: Japan
- Language: Japanese

Voice Without a Shadow (影なき声, Kagenaki koe) is a 1958 Japanese mystery film directed by Seijun Suzuki for the Nikkatsu Corporation. It is based on a novel by mystery writer Seichō Matsumoto.

== Cast ==
- Yôko Minamida as Asako Takahashi
- Toshio Takahara as Shigeo Kotani
- Hideaki Nitani as Hiroshi Ishikawa
- Nobuo Kaneko as Kawai
- Shinsuke Ashida as Muraoka
- Joe Shishido as Hamazaki
