= Yoshiko Shibaki =

Japanese writer (1914–1991)

- 芝木好子
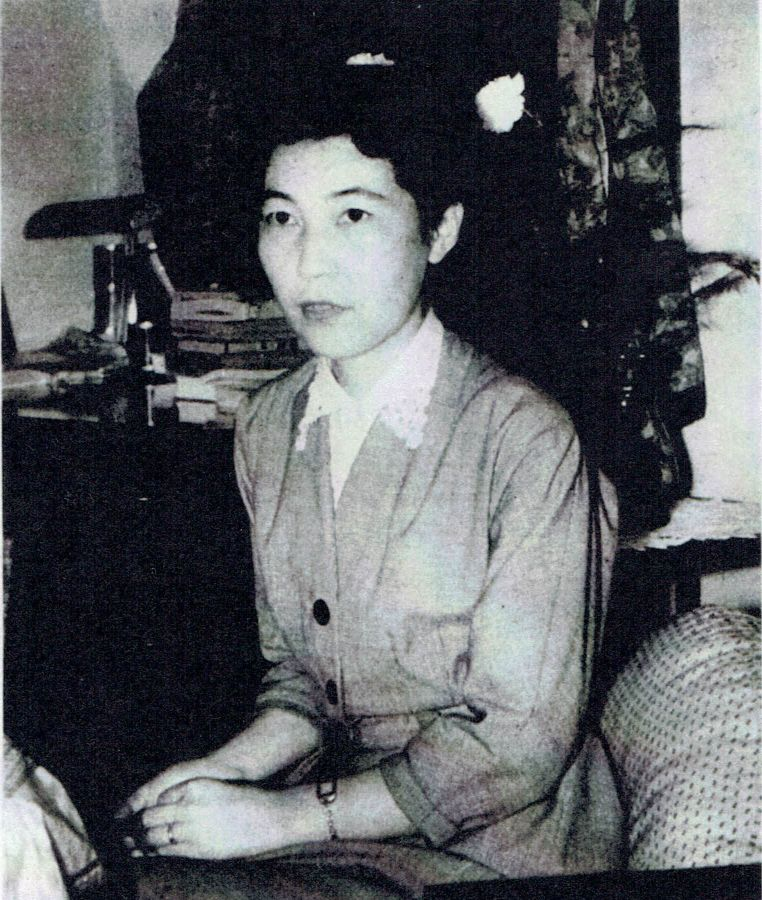
- Born: 7 May 1914; Oji, Kita-ku, Tokyo, Japan
- Died: 25 August 1991 (aged 77); Chuo-ku, Tokyo, Japan
- Occupation: Writer
- Notable work: Seika no ichi; Sumidagawa boshoku

Yoshiko Shibaki (芝木好子, Shibaki Yoshiko; 7 May 1914 – 25 August 1991) was a Japanese writer of short stories and novels. She was awarded numerous prizes for her work, including the Akutagawa Prize and the Women's Literature Prize.

== Biography ==
=== Early life ===
Shibaki was born in Tokyo on 7 May 1914 into a merchant family. From an early age on, she was trained in traditional Japanese arts like the tea ceremony, writing tanka and painting, and was taken to see kabuki plays. She graduated from Tokyo Prefectural Daiichi High School in 1932 and started studying English at Surugadai YWCA Women's Academy.

After her father's death, she aborted her studies and started working at the Mitsubishi Center for Economic Studies to support her family. In 1941, she married economist Kiyoshi Oshima.

=== Career ===
Shibaki started contributing to literary magazines such as Reijokai and Wakakusa in 1935 after her mother's death. She was awarded the Akutagawa Prize in 1941 for her short story "Seika no ichi" (青果の市, lit. "The fruit and vegetable market"), making her the second female writer to win the award. During World War II, she was sent to Manchuria by the Japanese military government to write about Japanese settlements there, while her literary output lessened.

After the war, she published stories like Nagareru hi (lit. "The coursing sun"), Onna hitori (lit. "A woman alone") and Ruri no uta (lit. "The journey song") which thematised domestic social changes. In the 1950s, she gained critical attention with Susaki paradaisu (lit. "Susaki paradise") and Yakoo no onna (lit. "Women in illumination"), both fictional accounts of Tokyo's prostitution milieu. Her trilogy of biographical stories, Yuba (lit. "Soya extract"), Sumidagawa (lit. "The river Sumida") and Marounuchi hachigokan (lit. "Marounuchi building number eight"), published between 1960 and 1962, are regarded as highlights in her literary career.

She became a member of the Japan Art Academy in 1980, and received their Award for the Literary Arts in 1981. Her novel Sumidagawa boshoku (隅田川暮色, lit. "Dusk on the Sumida river") won the Shincho Literary Award and the Nihon Literature Prize.

Shibaki died of breast cancer on 25 August 1991.

== Bibliography (selected) ==
- Seika no ichi (青果の市), 1941
- Susaki paradaisu- Susaki Paradise (洲崎パラダイス), 1954
- Yuba (湯葉), 1960
- Yoru no tsuru- The Night Crane (夜の鶴), 1964
- Katsushika no onna (葛飾の女), 1965
- Asu o shirazu (明日を知らず), 1968
- Kazahana (風花), 1970
- Kiiroi Kotei (黄色い皇帝), 1976
- Onna no shozo (女の肖像), 1979
- Sumidagawa boshoku (隅田川暮色), 1984
- Susaki no onna (洲崎の女), 1994

== Film adaptations (selected) ==
- 1956: Suzaki Paradise: Red Light (dir. Yūzō Kawashima), based on Susaki paradaisu
- 1956: Street of Shame (dir. Kenji Mizoguchi), based on Yakoo no onna
