= Foundry Town =

1962 Japanese film by Kirio Urayama

- Japanese film poster
- Directed by: Kirio Urayama
- Written by: Chiyo Hayafune; Shohei Imamura; Kirio Urayama
- Produced by: Kano Otsuka
- Starring: Sayuri Yoshinaga
- Cinematography: Shinsaku Himeda
- Edited by: Mutsuo Tanji
- Music by: Toshiro Mayuzumi
- Distributed by: Nikkatsu
- Release date: 8 April 1962 (Japan)
- Running time: 99 minutes
- Country: Japan
- Language: Japanese

Foundry Town (Japanese: キューポラのある街, Hepburn: Kyūpora no aru machi) is a 1962 Japanese drama film directed by Kirio Urayama. It was entered into the 1962 Cannes Film Festival and won the Blue Ribbon Awards in 1962.

== Synopsis ==
Kawaguchi in Saitama Prefecture is a city where many cupolas of foundries stand side by side. Jun is the eldest child of Tatsugoro ISHIGURO, a foundry worker at a local factory, and is a senior at junior high school, aiming to go on to full-time high school. Tatsugoro is unable to work satisfactorily due to the aftereffects of a serious injury sustained at work, and when the company he works for is acquired by a competitor, he becomes a target for layoff. The Ishiguro family falls in dire straits, with their eldest son Takayuki, who is in sixth grade at elementary school, their second son Tetsuharu, who is not yet in school, and a newborn baby boy. Katsumi, a young man who is a neighbor and former colleague of Tatsugoro, feels sorry for the Ishiguro family and negotiates with the president of the new company through the labor union, succeeding in getting the equivalent of several months' worth of injury and sickness benefits paid, but Tatsugoro, ashamed of having been "indebted to the Reds," spends all the money on alcohol and motorcycle racing.

In order to earn money for living expenses and tuition for her desired full-time high school, Jun starts working part-time at a pachinko parlor where her classmate Yoshie works. Tatsugoro's wife Tomi, the mother of Jun and her siblings, also stops working at a home job and starts working at a pub. Takayuki comes up with the idea of collecting wild pigeon eggs, training them as carrier pigeons, and selling them, but it doesn't work out well because the chicks are eaten by cats.

In the junior high school class about to go on a school trip, students are asking their teachers to raise the amount of cash they can carry as pocket money due to rising prices, and a vote is held at a class meeting. Noda, the homeroom teacher who is present, is concerned about Jun, who does not actively support the idea. Noda follows Jun on her way home from school and sees her enter a pachinko parlor. At that moment, Katsumi, a former student of Noda, appears and explains Jun's situation. The next day, Noda tells Jun that the city's Board of Education is subsidizing school trip expenses for poor students, and hands her the money from the Board.

Tatsugoro gets a job at a new foundry through the introduction by Jun's classmate Nobuko's father, Tougo, but there is no place for an old craftsman who relies on intuition and experience in an automated factory, so he quits without telling his family. Tatsugoro reveals this on the morning of Jun's departure for the school trip, causing his family to panic. Jun, in order not to see Nobuko, does not go to the meeting place at Kawaguchi Station, but kills time on the riverbank (there is a scene that makes viewers infer she has her first period), and takes a local train to Urawa where her desired school is. Peeking into the high school ground through the fence, Jun is disillusioned when she sees the physical education class that looks like a childish dance. Meanwhile, Takayuki, who has also skipped school and come to Urawa, sets free a pigeon he has raised there and succeeds in returning it to its cage at home.

Jun, who returned to Kawaguchi, happened to look into the pub where Tomi works and was shocked to see Tomi flirting with male patrons. There, Jun meets a female student who has dropped out of school, nicknamed "Squirrel," and is invited to a bar, where she drinks alcohol for the first time in her life. There, she is nearly molested by some delinquent boys, but narrowly escapes. Since that day, Jun stops going to school.

Worried about Jun, Noda visits the Ishiguro family. Jun spits out, "There's no point in studying," but Noda advises her, "Studying for exams isn't the only way to study. Even if you don't go to high school and work, you have to study so that you can always have your own opinion, by building up an understanding of what's happening in front of you." Jun resumes attending school and goes on a field trip to a factory of Hitachi, a major electronics manufacturer. Seeing the female factory workers who work while studying at a part-time high school at night and are also active in club activities such as chorus, Jun sees the independent image of modern workers and begins to admire them.

One day, Yoshie's family decides to leave their Japanese mother behind and return to North Korea as part of a major program to repatriate Koreans living in Japan. Yoshie's younger brother and Takayuki's best friend Sankichi is also leaving Japan, and Takayuki comes to Kawaguchi Station to see him off. He gives him a bag full of marbles as a farewell gift, as well as a carrier pigeon he has raised, and asks Sankichi to attach a letter and release the pigeon from the train window at Nishi-Kawaguchi Station. Yoshie, on her part, gives her favorite bicycle to Jun, who also came to the station. The group stays in Ueno, Tokyo that night, and plans to head to Niigata Port, where the repatriation ship departs, the next day. The next day, the train to Niigata passes Nishi-Kawaguchi Station, and Sankichi releases the pigeon. Seeing the pigeon flying back to Kawaguchi, Sankichi longs for his mother and gets off the train at Omiya Station. However, when Sankichi returns to Kawaguchi, his mother has closed the diner she was running and disappeared to marry someone else. Takayuki leaves Sankichi with the family of Choi who lives nearby until the next return ship departs in the new year, and the two start working part-time delivering newspapers, vowing to "stop relying on others."

Suddenly, Tatsugoro is reinstated to his former workplace. Katsumi comes over and offers them a celebration drink, during which Jun reveals her intention to take a job at Hitachi, a company she had visited. On the morning Sankichi leaves for Niigata, Jun and Takayuki see him off on the train from the Kawaguchi Overpass. That day is also the day of Jun's job interview. The siblings run energetically through the city to Kawaguchi Station.

== Cast ==
- Sayuri Yoshinaga as Jun ISHIGURO
- Mitsuo Hamada as Katsumi TSUKAMOTO
- Eijirō Tōno as Tatsugoro ISHIGURO (Jun's father)
- Tokuko Sugiyama as Tomi (Jun's mother)
- Yoshio Ichikawa as Takayuki (Jun's 1st younger brother)
- Toru Iwaki as Tetsuharu (Jun's 2nd younger brother)
- Takeshi Katō as NODA (Jun's teacher)
- Tanie Kitabayashi as Ume TSUKAMOTO (Katsumi's grandmother)
- Mitsuko Suzuki as Yoshie KANAYAMA (Jun's friend)
- Hideki Morisaka as Sankichi KANAYAMA (Yoshie's brother)
- Jun Hamamura as Mr KANAYAMA (father of Yoshie & Sankichi)
- Kin Sugai as Miyo KANAYAMA (mother of Yoshie & Sankichi)
- Junko Hiyoshi as Nobuko NAKAJIMA (Jun's friend)
- Tsutomu Shimomoto as Togo NAKAJIMA (Nobuko's father)
- Taiji Tonoyama as Shoji MATSUNAGA (President of Matsunaga Foundry)
- Shoichi Ozawa as teacher at juvenile detention home
- Kazuko Yoshiyuki as female worker at Hitachi
- Kayoko Aoki as girl nicknamed "Squirrel"
- Akiji Kobayashi as Hei-san (workman at wood pattern factory)
- Kawai Okada as Kaori
- Hisashi Tezuka as milk delivery boy
