= Man with a Shotgun =

1961 film

- Directed by: Seijun Suzuki
- Written by: Kenrō Matsūra
- Produced by: Kaneo Iwai
- Starring: Hideaki Nitani; Izumi Ashikawa
- Cinematography: Shigeyoshi Mine
- Edited by: Akira Suzuki
- Music by: Masayoshi Ikeda
- Distributed by: Nikkatsu
- Release date: June 4, 1961
- Running time: 84 minutes
- Country: Japan
- Language: Japanese

Man with a Shotgun (散弾銃(ショットガン)の男, Shottogan no Otoko; aka The Man with the Hollow-Tip Bullets) is a 1961 Japanese Western film directed by Seijun Suzuki in the vein of the Nikkatsu Studio's "borderless action cinema". Hideaki Nitani stars as a singing cowboy and trucker who seeks revenge after his girlfriend is raped and murdered.

== Cast ==
- Hideaki Nitani as Watari
- Izumi Ashikawa as Setsuko Okumura
- Toshio Takahara as Okumura
- Jun Hamamura as president
- Asao Sano as Kuronuma
