= A Killer Without a Grave =

1961 Japanese film by Ushihara Yoichi

Kurenai no Kenju
- Film poster
- Directed by: Ushihara Yoichi
- Written by: Matsuura Kenro
- Starring: Akagi Keiichiro; Shiraki Mari; Tarumi Goro; Sasamori Reiko; Ashida Shinsuke
- Cinematography: Shinsaku Himeda
- Edited by: Tsujii Masanori
- Music by: Kosugi Taiichiro
- Distributed by: Nikkatsu
- Release date: February 11, 1961 (Japan)
- Running time: 87 minutes
- Country: Japan
- Language: Japanese

Kurenai no Kenju (紅の拳銃) (English: A Killer Without a Grave) is a 1961 stylistic crime suspense Japanese film directed by Ushihara Yoichi.

== Plot ==
Sitting in the corner of the nightclub "Gin no Shiro," Ishioka is spying on a nihilistic young man, Nakata. Ishioka, who has lost his arm in the war, hires Nakata as a hitman. After first rescuing a fleeing gangster moll (Chikako) in the club, Nakata slowly hones his technique.

Ishioka has a blind sister named Kikuyo. It is said that going to a certain university hospital in Kobe may cure her of her blindness.

One day, yakuza leader Kokuta puts out a hit on a woman - it's the fleeing moll of the Kobe boss, Chikako. The Kobe boss of the Chinese Triads is Chen Mansho. Chen wants her dead after she learned the route of his lucrative drug trade. But Nakata, having grown protective of Chicako, doesn't want to kill her. They run away together. But Nakata is captured by Chen, and Chikako is taken away.

Kokuta learns that Nakata is protecting Chikako, and orders Ishioka to kill him. Ishioka goes after Nakata, and goes to Kobe, not knowing that he has been captured. It is there that he, too is caught by Chen. Kikuyo is also kidnapped by Chen.

Chen's younger brother Dalong flees to Kobe after the drug kingpin in Hong Kong is killed. He and Chen conspire to get rid of all of Kokudera's crew in Tokyo. They take the captured Ishioka, Kikuyo and Nakata to the dunes to kill them, but just then, three men appear and gun down the brother.

The three men are in fact hitmen hired by another Chinese man, Liu. Liu introduces himself to Nakata. It turns out that his wife was once Nakata's girlfriend, and has fond memories of him. Liu was in fact the one who attacked Chen's Hong Kong gang. There is a battle. Chikako, Chen, and Liu are all killed. Just then, the police arrive.

Nakata was, in fact, an undercover detective all along. In the end, Kikuyo is able to have her surgery, and her eyes are cured.

== Cast ==
- Akagi Keiichiro - Nakata Katsumi
- Shiraki Mari - Bokuto Chikako
- Tarumi Goro - Ishioka Kunishiro
- Sasamori Reiko - Ishioka Kikuyo
- Ashida Shinsuke - Kokuta
- Kusanagi Kôjirô - Chen
- Ozawa Eitarô - Liu
