= Mutekiga Ore o Yondeiru =

- Film poster
- Directed by: Yamazaki Tokujirō
- Screenplay by: Kei Kumai
- Starring: Keiichirō Akagi; Izumi Ashikawa; Sayuri Yoshinaga; Ryoji Hayama; Kō Nishimura
- Cinematography: Shinsaku Himeda
- Edited by: Akira Suzuki
- Music by: Naozumi Yamamoto
- Production company: Nikkatsu
- Distributed by: Nikkatsu
- Release date: July 9, 1960 (Japan)
- Running time: 80 minutes
- Country: Japan
- Language: Japanese

Mutekiga Ore o Yondeiru (Japanese: 霧笛が俺を呼んでいる) also known as The Call of the Foghorn is a 1960 Japanese film directed by Yamazaki Tokujirō. It was the final film of young star Akagi Keiichiro before his death, and considered his most famous work.

== Plot ==
Sugi is a navigator of the ship Suzuran Maru. He returns to Yokohama while his she is under repairs, and after getting into a brawl over a prostitute who calls herself "Sally," is informed of the death of his old friend, Hamasaki. Police call it suicide, but Sugi doubts it, and he starts to investigate by himself.

Detective Morimoto tells Sugi that his friend was a drug dealer. When he returns home, he discovers that Sally had called him, but when he goes to her apartment, he discovers that she has been murdered. Sugi goes to speak with Hamazaki's girlfriend, Miyako. She tells him that she and Hamazaki were being targeted by the manager of the nightclub "35 Knots," where he had brawled and met Sally the day before. His name was Watanabe, and had also been targeting Sally, and her friend, Kazuko.

Sugi hides Kazuko on the Suzuran Maru ship. Kazuko tells him that Sally's pimp had been missing since the night of Hamazaki's drowning. He suspected that Hamazaki isn't dead at all, and goes after Watanabe. Hamazaki tells Sugi to stop meddling. He shows Sugi a photograph that proves Hamazaki is a drug dealer. Discovering that his friend is indeed alive, he insists on knowing his whereabouts, so that he can hear it from his friend's lips.

Hamazaki has been hoarding drugs and planning his escape. He returns to his hideout, ready to leave, and finds Sugi and Miyako there waiting for him. They confront him. He pulls out a gun. Just then, detective Morimoto knock on the door. Doing his arrest, however, his accomplice in the elevator attacks Morimoto and allows Hamazaki to escape. Morimoto shoots the both of them as they run away, and Hamazaki dies from his injuries.

The movie ends with a saddened Sugi leaving Yokohama Port forever.

== Cast ==
- Keiichirō Akagi as Sugi Keiichi
- Izumi Ashikawa as Miyako
- Sayuri Yoshinaga as Yukiko
- Ryoji Hayama as Hamazaki Morio
- Ryōhei Uchida as Watanabe
- Kō Nishimura as Morimoto

== Notes ==
- The theme song "Muteki ga ore wo Yondeiru," also sung by the lead actor, became a hit single on release of the film.
- Yoshinaga Sayuri, who would go on to be a veteran actress, made one of her first appearances in this film.
