= Zegen =

- Poster for Zegen (1987)
- Directed by: Shohei Imamura
- Written by: Shohei Imamura; Kota Okabe
- Starring: Ken Ogata; Mitsuko Baisho
- Cinematography: Masao Tochizawa
- Edited by: Hajime Okayasu
- Music by: Shin’ichirō Ikebe
- Production companies: Imamura Productions; Toei Co. Ltd.
- Distributed by: Toei Co. Ltd.
- Release date: 5 September 1987 (Japan)
- Running time: 120 minutes
- Country: Japan
- Language: Japanese

Zegen (Japanese: 女衒 ZEGEN) is a 1987 Japanese black comedy film by director Shohei Imamura. It was entered into the 1987 Cannes Film Festival. The film was selected as the Japanese entry for the Best Foreign Language Film at the 60th Academy Awards, but was not accepted as a nominee.

== Plot ==
The film tells the story of Iheiji Muraoka, who built brothels for the Japanese military.

== Cast ==
- Ken Ogata as Iheiji Muraoka
- Mitsuko Baisho as Shiho
- Bang-ho Cho as Komashitai
- Yuki Furutachi
- Shino Ikenami as Tome
- Kozo Ishii as Kumai
- Satoko Iwasaki
- Kurenai Kanda as Otsuno
- Choichiro Kawarazaki as Kunikura
- Chun Hsiung Ko as Wang (as Chun-Hsiung Ko)
- Hiroyuki Konishi as Uehara
- Mami Kumagaya as Kino
- Leonard Kuma as Shop owner
- Norihei Miki as Tomonaga
- Sanshō Shinsui as Chota
- Tetta Sugimoto as Genkichi
- Minori Terada as Hisamitsu
- Taiji Tonoyama as Shimada
- Fujio Tsuneta as Nishiyama
- Kimiko Yoshimiya as Takeyo

== See also ==
- Cinema of Japan
- List of submissions to the 60th Academy Awards for Best Foreign Language Film
- List of Japanese submissions for the Academy Award for Best Foreign Language Film
