= Suzaki Paradise: Red Light =

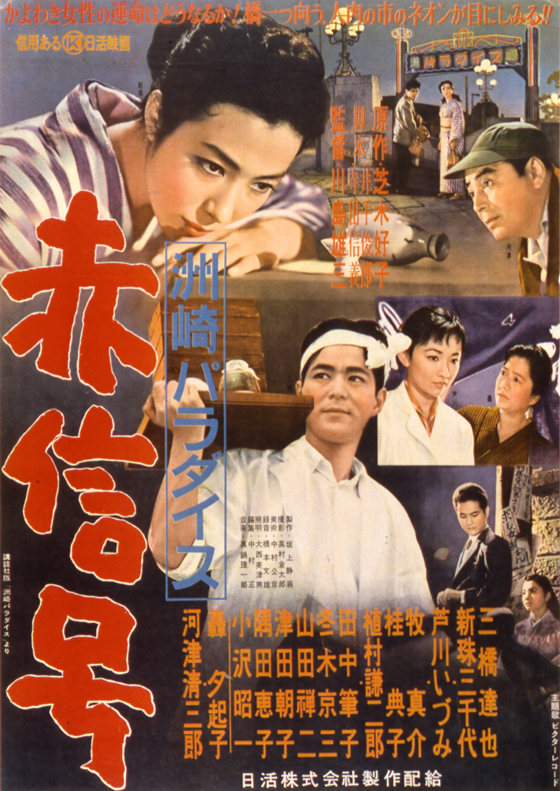
- Japanese movie poster
- Directed by: Yūzō Kawashima
- Written by: Toshirō Ide; Nobuyoshi Terada; Yoshiko Shibaki (novel)
- Produced by: Shizuo Sakagami
- Starring: Michiyo Aratama; Yukiko Todoroki; Seizaburō Kawazu; Tatsuya Mihashi
- Cinematography: Kurataro Takamura
- Edited by: Tadashi Nakamura
- Music by: Riichirō Manabe
- Production company: Nikkatsu
- Distributed by: Nikkatsu
- Release date: 31 July 1956 (Japan)
- Running time: 81 minutes
- Country: Japan
- Language: Japanese

Suzaki Paradise: Red Light a.k.a. Suzaki Paradise: Red Light District or Suzaki Paradise: Akashingō (Japanese: 洲崎パラダイス 赤信号, Hepburn: Suzaki paradaisu akashingō) is a 1956 Japanese drama film directed by Yūzō Kawashima. It is based on a novel by Yoshiko Shibaki. Director Kawashima called Suzaki Paradise: Red Light the favourite among his own films.

== Synopsis ==
A jobless young couple, Yoshiji and Tsutae, wind up at the outskirts of the Suzaki red-light district in Tokyo where she once worked as a prostitute. Tsutae talks her way into a waitress job at the small bar of Osami, where they rent a room. Osami, mother of two children, manages the shop alone after she was abandoned by her husband. Yoshiji starts working as an errand boy in a nearby soba shop, jealous of Tsutae whose direct manners attract the male customers. Fed up with Yoshiji's jealousy and self-pity, and their monetary struggles, she accepts the offer of Mr. Ochiai, a regular customer and owner of a radio store, to move into a flat he pays for her. Yoshiji's colleague Tamako, who feels sympathetic towards him, is worried about his deteriorating condition. Upon Tsutae's return to Yoshiji, who had begun to regain his composure in the interim, he initially hesitates. Eventually, they board a bus together, their destination unknown, symbolizing a journey into uncertainty.

== Cast ==
- Michiyo Aratama as Tsutae
- Yukiko Todoroki as Osami
- Seizaburō Kawazu as Mr. Ochiai
- Tatsuya Mihashi as Yoshiji
- Izumi Ashikawa as Tamako
- Shōichi Ozawa as Sankichi
- Kazuko Tani
