= Victory Is Mine =

- Directed by: Seijun Suzuki (Note: Credited as Seitarō Suzuki.)
- Written by: Norio Nakagawa; Kiriro Urayama
- Produced by: Kenzō Asada; Tsukiji Rokurō
- Starring: Kō Mishima; Shinsuke Maki; Sumiko Minami; Keiko Amaji
- Cinematography: Kumenobu Fujioka
- Edited by: Mitsuo Kondō
- Music by: Hideo Hirakawa
- Production company: Nikkatsu
- Distributed by: Nikkatsu
- Release date: March 21, 1956
- Running time: 65 minutes
- Country: Japan
- Language: Japanese

Victory Is Mine (港の乾杯 勝利をわが手に, Minato no Kanpai: Shōri o Waga Te ni; aka Harbour Toast: Victory Is in Our Grasp) is a 1956 Japanese B movie directed by Seijun Suzuki for the Nikkatsu Corporation. It is Suzuki's first film, credited under his given name Seitarō Suzuki. The film was primarily a vehicle for an already popular song.

== Cast ==
- Kō Mishima
- Sumiko Minami
- Keiko Amaji
- Shinsuke Maki
- Kōichi Aoki
