= History of Postwar Japan as Told by a Bar Hostess =

- Directed by: Shōhei Imamura
- Screenplay by: Shōhei Imamura
- Produced by: Nobuyo Horiba; Motoo Ogasawara
- Starring: Emiko Akaza; Etsuko Akaza; Akemi Akaza; Shōhei Imamura
- Cinematography: Masao Tochikawa
- Edited by: Mutsuo Niwa; Noriaki Sugimoto
- Music by: Haruo Ibe
- Production companies: Nippon Eiga Shinsha; Toho
- Distributed by: Toho
- Release date: 6 March 1970 (Japan)
- Running time: 105 minutes
- Country: Japan

History of Postwar Japan as Told by a Bar Hostess (にっぽん戦後史 マダムおんぼろの生活, Nippon sengoshi – Madamu Onboro no seikatsu) is a 1970 Japanese documentary film directed and written by Shōhei Imamura.

== Synopsis ==
Shōhei Imamura interviews Emiko Akaza, the bar hostess of the film's title, who reflects on her life as a prostitute and madam in post-war Yokosuka and comments on news reel footage of Japan's history from 1945 to the present.

== Production ==
After the poor box-office performance of his ambitious 1968 film, The Profound Desire of the Gods, Imamura decided to undertake a more modestly budgeted film. Characteristically, Imamura seeks to investigate an alternative interpretation of recent Japanese history through the eyes of a person living in the lower strata of that society.

Beginning with this film, Imamura was to spend the next decade working in the documentary format. He returned to purely fictional narrative with Vengeance is Mine (1979).

== Release ==
History of Postwar Japan as Told by a Bar Hostess was released in Japan 3 June 1970 where it was distributed by Toho. The film was shown in Los Angeles in 1998 with any earlier American release being undetermined.
