= Sun in the Last Days of the Shogunate =

1957 Japanese film

- Japanese film poster
- Directed by: Yūzō Kawashima
- Written by: Yūzō Kawashima; Shōhei Imamura; Keiichi Tanaka
- Produced by: Takeshi Yamamoto
- Starring: Frankie Sakai; Sachiko Hidari; Yōko Minamida
- Cinematography: Kurataro Takamura
- Edited by: Tadashi Nakamura
- Music by: Toshiro Mayuzumi
- Production company: Nikkatsu
- Distributed by: Nikkatsu
- Release date: 14 July 1957 (Japan)
- Running time: 110 minutes
- Country: Japan
- Language: Japanese

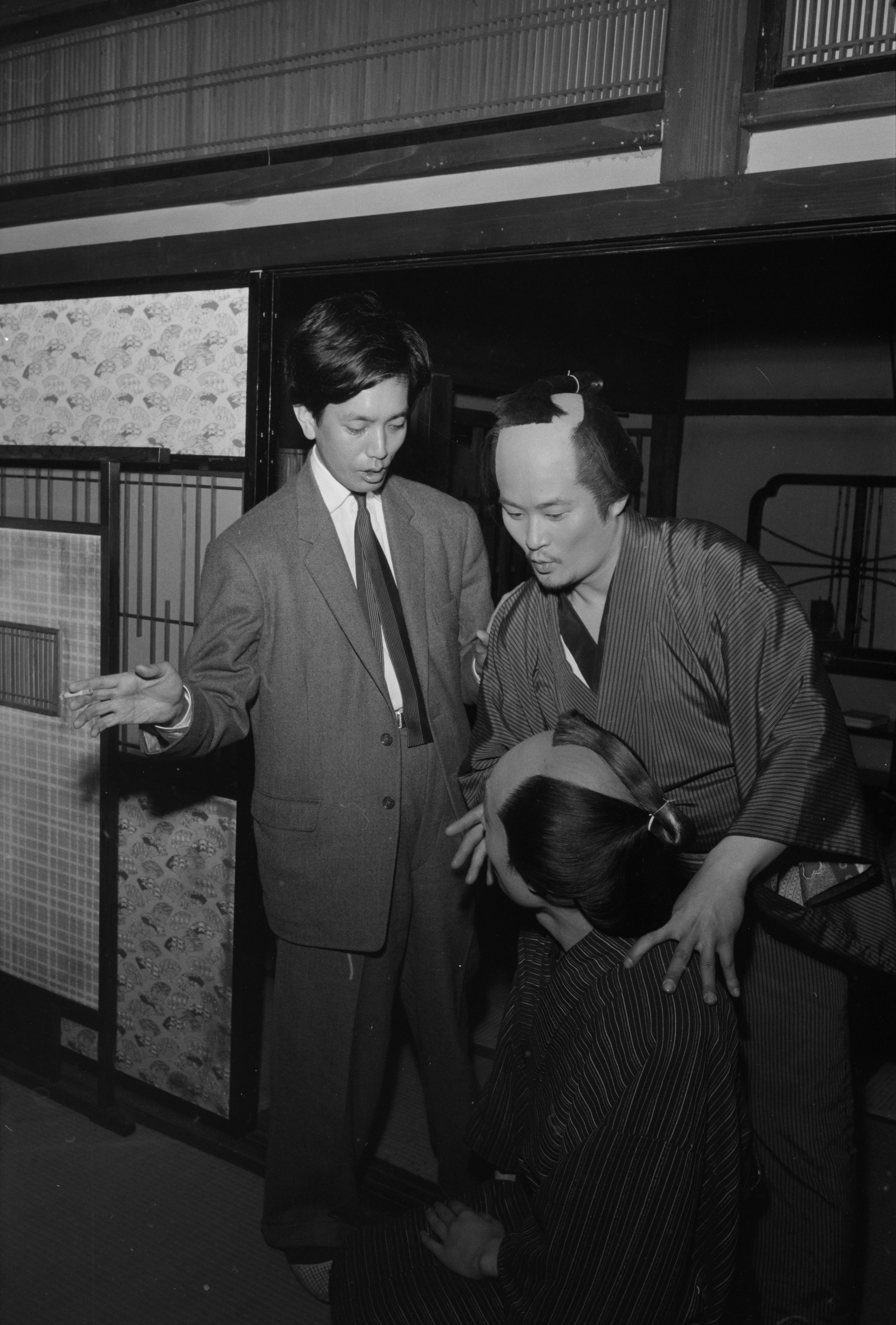
Yūzō Kawashima (left) directing actor Frankie Sakai

Sun in the Last Days of the Shogunate (Japanese: 幕末太陽傳 or 幕末太陽伝, Hepburn: Bakumatsu Taiyōden), also known as A Sun-Tribe Myth from the Bakumatsu Era, is a 1957 Japanese comedy film directed by Yūzō Kawashima and written by Kawashima, Shōhei Imamura and Keiichi Tanaka. It was voted the fifth best Japanese film of all time in a poll of 140 Japanese critics and filmmakers conducted by the magazine Kinema Junpo in 1999.

== Plot ==
During the last days of the Bakumatsu era, rogue city dweller Saheiji and three friends visit a brothel in Tokyo's Shinagawa entertainment district. After spending the night there, Saheiji is forced to admit that he lacks the money to pay, so he must stay in order to settle his debt. Saheiji seeks to outwit the inhabitants of a brothel in order to survive. Meanwhile, a group of samurai seek to destroy any foreigners that cross their path. Saheiji attracts all employees, from brothel owners to prostitutes, successfully resolves any disputes with clients by using his wit, and fills his pockets. However, gradually it turns out that the seemingly life-loving Saheiji suffers from tuberculosis and his future is uncertain.

== Cast ==
- Frankie Sakai as Saheiji
- Yōko Minamida as Koharu
- Sachiko Hidari as Osome
- Yujiro Ishihara as Takasugi Shinsaku
- Nobuo Kaneko as Denbei, the owner of the Sagami-ya
- Masumi Okada as Kisuke
- Tomio Aoki as Chusuke
- Shōichi Ozawa as Kinzō, the book lender
- Shōbun Inoue as Genta
- Toshio Takahara as Kaneji
- Izumi Ashikawa as Ohisa
- Akira Nishimura as Shinkō
- Taiji Tonoyama as Kurazō
- Hideaki Nitani as Shidō Monta (a.k.a. Inoue Kaoru)
- Akira Kobayashi as Kusaka Genzui

== Theme ==
Parallels are drawn between the world of the samurai and the world of Kawashima's Japan. The hypocrisy surrounding prostitution, about to be outlawed in Japan at that time in 1950s Japan, the abuse of power, and financial greed at a time of crisis, are all portrayed.
