= The Baby Carriage =

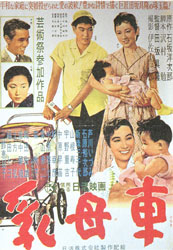
- Japanese movie poster
- Directed by: Tomotaka Tasaka
- Written by: Yōjirō Ishizaka (story); Tsutomu Sawamura (writer)
- Produced by: Nikkatsu
- Release date: 14 November 1956
- Country: Japan
- Language: Japanese

The Baby Carriage (乳母車, Ubaguruma) is a 1956 black-and-white Japanese film directed by Tomotaka Tasaka.

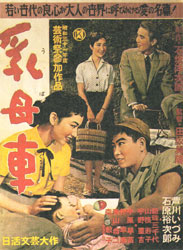
Japanese movie poster

== Cast ==
- Yujiro Ishihara as Muneo Aizawa
- Michiyo Aratama: Tomoko Aizawa
- Izumi Ashikawa: Yumiko Kuwahara
- Toyo Fukuda: Katsu Kijima
- Ryoha Hatanaka: Old man
- Hiroshi Hijikata: Policeman
- Ikunosuke Koizumi
- Eiko Misuz: Natsuko Murakami
- Kyoko Mori: Mariko Aizawa
- Sanae Nakahara: Sachiko Kaneda
- Sonosuke Niki
- Masao Oda: Doctor
- Akiko Sagawa: Shige, maid
- Ichiro Sakai
