= The Graceful Brute =

- Film poster
- しとやかな獣
- Directed by: Yūzō Kawashima
- Written by: Kaneto Shindō
- Produced by: Osamu Yoneda; Masaki Suda
- Starring: Ayako Wakao; Yūnosuke Itō
- Cinematography: Nobuo Munekawa
- Edited by: Tatsuji Nakashizu
- Music by: Sei Ikeno
- Production company: Daiei
- Distributed by: Daiei
- Release date: 26 December 1962 (Japan)
- Running time: 96 minutes
- Country: Japan
- Language: Japanese

The Graceful Brute a.k.a. Elegant Beast (Japanese: しとやかな獣, Hepburn: Shitoyakana kedamono) is a 1962 Japanese satirical comedy film directed by Yūzō Kawashima and written by Kaneto Shindō.

== Plot ==
The family of ex-naval officer Tokizo Maeda lives in a small urban concrete block apartment, always quick at hiding their belongings when the situation asks for a humble appearance. While daughter Tomoko, mistress (at her father's instruction) of a famous bestselling writer, won't stop borrowing money from her patron for the family, son Minoru, signed to a music talent agency, constantly embezzles the company's assets. Father and son both have their very own plans for the money: Tokizo invests in one military project after another, Minoru, to his father's consternation, spends it on his lover Yukie, none other than his agency's bookkeeper. When Yukie quits her job, using the occasion to end the liaison with Minoru, it turns out that she also had affairs with the company boss and the tax officer in charge, using the donations she received to finance her own hotel.

== Cast ==
- Ayako Wakao as Yukie Mitani
- Yūnosuke Itō as Tokizo Maeda
- Hisano Yamaoka as Yoshino, Tokizo's wife
- Yūko Hamada as Tomoko, Tokizo's daughter
- Hideo Takamatsu as Ichiro Katori
- Eiji Funakoshi as Eisaku Kamiya, the tax collector
- Manamitsu Kawabata as Minoru, Tokizo's son
- Shōichi Ozawa as Pinosaku, the singer
- Kyū Sazanka as Shuntaro Yoshizawa, the writer

== Reception ==
Film scholar Alexander Jacoby called The Graceful Brute Kawashima's (who died the following year) last noteworthy film, stating that its "theatrical artificiality" and use of one single set mirrored director Nagisa Ōshima's techniques.
