= Young Breasts =

- Film poster
- Directed by: Seijun Suzuki
- Written by: Heigo Suzuki; Yoshiro Tsuji
- Produced by: Takeshi Yamamoto
- Starring: Akira Kobayashi; Sachiko Hidari; Hideaki Nitani
- Cinematography: Kazue Nagatsuka
- Edited by: Akira Suzuki
- Music by: Seiji Hiraoka
- Distributed by: Nikkatsu
- Release date: September 8, 1958 (Japan)
- Running time: 90 minutes
- Country: Japan
- Language: Japanese

Young Breasts (Japanese: 青い乳房, Hepburn: Aoi chibusa) is a 1958 Japanese juvenile delinquent film directed by Seijun Suzuki for the Nikkatsu Corporation. Akira Kobayashi stars as a young hoodlum who tries to go straight after falling in love with his social worker.

== Cast ==
- Yoshio Oomori as Kouzou Horie
- Akira Kobayashi as Hiroshi Horie
- Misako Watanabe as Masako Horie
- Kotoe Hatsui as Tomiko Kozaki
- Hideaki Nitani as Tsuneo Takamura
- Shouichi Ozawa as Sukimoto
- Keisuke Noro as Chin Tooru
