= Endless Desire =

1958 Japanese film

- Directed by: Shōhei Imamura
- Written by: Shōhei Imamura; Hisashi Yamanouchi; Shinji Fujiwara (novel)
- Starring: Hiroyuki Nagato; Sanae Nakahara; Kō Nishimura; Taiji Tonoyama
- Cinematography: Shinsaku Himeda
- Edited by: Mutsuo Tanji
- Music by: Toshiro Mayuzumi
- Production company: Nikkatsu
- Distributed by: Nikkatsu
- Release date: 18 November 1958 (Japan)
- Running time: 101 minutes
- Country: Japan
- Language: Japanese

Endless Desire (果しなき欲望, Hateshinaki yokubō) is a 1958 Japanese black comedy and crime film by Shōhei Imamura.

In the film, war veterans of the Pacific War conspire to uncover a hidden morphine supply. The area of the hiding place is about to be demolished, and they have to hurry. The conspirators soon turn on each other, as they try to claim sole ownership over their loot.

== Plot ==
Ten years after the end of the Pacific War, four ex-soldiers meet to retrieve a quantity of morphine which had been hidden in an air-raid shelter: Onuma, pharmacist Nakata, professional criminal Yamamoto, and teacher Sawai. As the men had once been informed by their superior, Lieutenant Hashimoto, that only three men knew of the morphine, not four, they at first suspect Sawai to be an intruder. They are joined by a woman, Shima, who declares that she is the younger sister of the Lieutenant who has died in the meantime.

The area around the shelter has been turned into a shopping district, while the shelter itself is now the basement of a butcher shop. The group rents an empty store from corrupt local landlord Kinzō and starts digging a tunnel to the butcher shop. Shima announces that she will sleep with the man who digs up the most during their venture. Later, she seduces Kinzō's son Satoru, although Satoru tries to court the butcher's daughter Ryūko. Yamamoto is arrested for a burglary, but escapes and returns to the group. He tries to rape Shima, but is stopped by Sawai.

When Kinzō announces that the area will be demolished in the next few days due to a decree of the city's council, the group's dig becomes a race against time. Sawai eventually kills the violent Yamamoto, but is himself buried alive under sand when the group has reached the basement and left him behind. With only Onuma, Nakata and Shima left, Onuma learns that Shima is actually Lieutenant Hashimoto's widow, and that she and Nakata, who turns out to be the intruder, had been charged for killing her husband but released later for lack of evidence. Shima poisons Onuma and then stabs Nakata to have the morphine all to herself. Satoru calls the police when he stumbles onto the scene. While fleeing through a heavy rain storm, Shima slips on a wet crossing and drowns in the river running underneath.

== Cast ==
- Hiroyuki Nagato as Satoru
- Sanae Nakahara as Ryūko
- Kō Nishimura as Nakata
- Taiji Tonoyama as Onuma
- Shōichi Ozawa as Sawai
- Takeshi Katō as Yamamoto
- Misako Watanabe as Shima
- Ichirō Sugai as Onoyu Kinzō

== Production ==
Endless Desire was the third film Imamura had been assigned to by Nikkatsu studios. In a later interview, Imamura stated that this film foreshadowed his 1961 Pigs and Battleships, one reason being the "formal dynamism" both films have in common. It was also his first collaboration with cinematographer Shinsaku Himeda, who photographed many of the director's films.
