= Keiichirō Akagi =

Japanese actor (1939-1961)

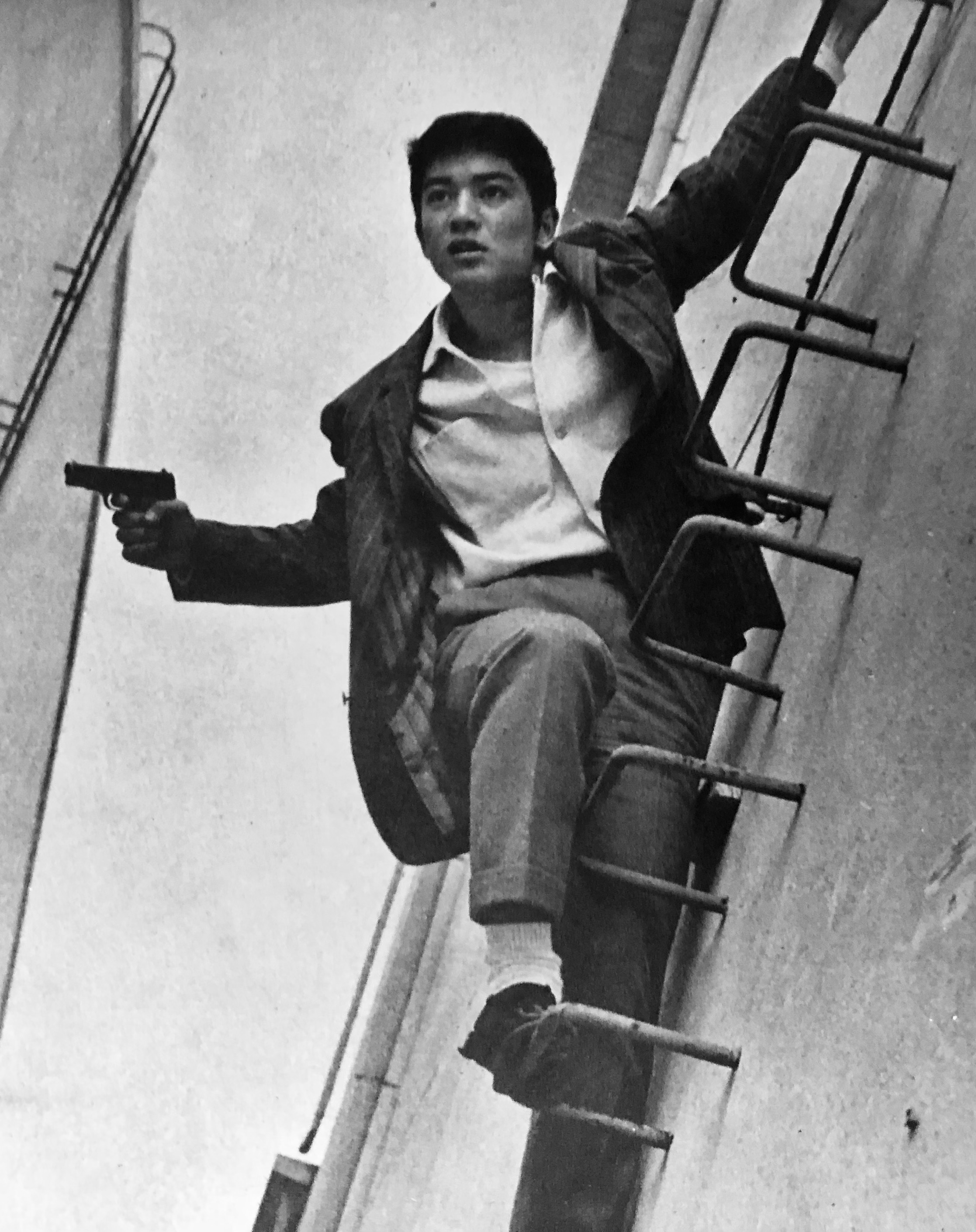
- Born: Chikahiro Akatsuka (赤塚 親弘); May 8, 1939; Azabu Kōgai-chō, Azabu District, Tokyo Prefecture, Japan
- Died: February 21, 1961 (aged 21); Komae, Kitatama District, Tokyo, Japan
- Other names: The Third Man; Tony; Cool Guy; Japanese James Dean
- Occupations: Actor, singer
- Years active: 1958-61

Keiichirō Akagi (赤木 圭一郎, Akagi Keiichirō), born Chikahiro Akatsuka (赤塚 親弘, Akatsuka Chikahiro) was a Japanese actor. Akagi appeared in over 26 films in his short three-year career. Kenju burai-chō series and The Call of the Foghorn are Akagi's notable films. Akagi was one of the box office hitter of Nikkatsu company alongside Yujiro Ishihara and Akira Kobayashi.

== Biography ==
=== Career ===
In 1958, he joined the Nikkatsu company. He landed the lead role for the first time in 1959 film Age of Nudity directed by Seijun Suzuki. In 1960, Akagi won Elan d'or Award for Newcomer of the Year.

=== Death ===
At around 12:20 PM on February 14, 1961, during a lunch break while shooting Gekiryū ni Ikiru Otoko, where he served as a replacement for injured Yūjirō Ishihara, Akagi was driving a go-cart brought by a salesman in the Nikkatsu studio but spun out of control and crashed into a steel door of a large tool warehouse at a speed of more than 60 km/h. He regained consciousness for a time, but on February 20 he fell into a coma again and died at 7:50 AM on February 21 of a subdural hematoma associated with a fracture of the cracked frontal bone, at the young age of 21.

At the time, some of his family conceded to his funeral in the Soto Zen religion at the Dai-enji Temple in Suginami, Tokyo. Later on, his cremated ashes were moved to the Head Temple Taisekiji in Fujinomiya.

== Filmography ==
- Kurenai no Tsubasa (1958) (as an extra)
- Love and Death (1959)
- Age of Nudity (1959)
- Kenju burai-chō series 1-4 (1960)
- Mutekiga Ore o Yondeiru (1960)
- Women of Kyoto (1960)
- Ginza Tomboy (1960)
- The Blue Beast 7 (1960)
- He, Killed Dad (1961)
- Kurenai no Kenju (1961)
- Akagi is Still Alive (1967)
