= Kurenai no Tsubasa =

- Film poster
- Directed by: Kō Nakahira
- Written by: Kō Nakahira; Akinori Matsuo
- Produced by: Takiko Mizunoe
- Starring: Yujiro Ishihara; Izumi Ashikawa; Hideaki Nitani; Shinsuke Ashida; Kō Nishimura; Sanae Nakahara
- Cinematography: Yoshihiro Yamazaki
- Edited by: Masanori Tsujii
- Music by: Seiichi Mawatari; Masaru Sato
- Production company: Nikkatsu
- Distributed by: Nikkatsu
- Release date: 28 December 1958 (Japan)
- Running time: 93 minutes
- Country: Japan
- Language: Japanese

Kurenai no Tsubasa (紅の翼, lit. Crimson Wings) is a 1958 black and white Japanese film directed and co-written by Kō Nakahira.

== Plot ==
On Hachijojima island, a child suffers from tetanus and urgently needs serum delivered. The pilot, Ishida Yasuji, ends up flying a small Cessna after a larger airplane breaks down. Newspaper reporter Yukie and Ohashi, who originally chartered the Cessna, accompany him, but Ohashi, who has just killed a man, forces Ishida to land the plane on a small island along the way in an attempt to escape capture.

== Cast ==
- Yujiro Ishihara as Ishida Yasuji
- Izumi Ashikawaa as Ishida Shinobu
- Hideaki Nitani as Ohashi Kazuo
- Masumi Okada
- Kō Nishimura as Mizutani Tetsuji
- Sanae Nakahara
- Shinsuke Ashida as Sasaki
- Shirō Osaka
- Kyosuke Machida
- Hisano Yamaoka
- Keiichirō Akagi as extra
- Toru Abe as Iwami Takeshi
- Masami Shimojō as Sekine Junzō

== Release ==
Nikkatsu released the film on December 28, 1958, in Japan. The film became one of the biggest Japanese box office hits of the 1950s.
