= A Chain of Islands =

- Film poster
- Directed by: Kei Kumai
- Screenplay by: Kei Kumai
- Based on: Nihon rettō by Koichiro Yoshihara
- Produced by: Yoshiaki Yabuuchi
- Starring: Jukichi Uno; Izumi Ashikawa; Hideaki Nitani; Mizuho Suzuki; Shosei Muto
- Narrated by: Kazuo Kitamura
- Cinematography: Shinsaku Himeda
- Edited by: Mutsuo Tanji
- Music by: Akira Ifukube
- Production company: Nikkatsu
- Distributed by: Nikkatsu
- Release date: 26 May 1965 (Japan)
- Running time: 116 minutes
- Country: Japan
- Language: Japanese

A Chain of Islands (Japanese: 日本列島, Hepburn: Nihon rettō; lit. Japanese Archipelago) is a 1965 Japanese mystery crime thriller written and directed by Kei Kumai. It is based on a novel of the same name by Koichiro Yoshihara. The film stars Jukichi Uno as Akiyama, an interpreter who investigates a conspiracy implicating the Occupation government in Japan. It co-stars Izumi Ashikawa, Hideaki Nitani, Mizuho Suzuki and Shosei Muto in supporting roles. The film's score was composed by Akira Ifukube. A Chain of Islands was theatrically released by Nikkatsu on 26 May 1965, in Japan.

== Plot ==
The film is set in 1959, amidst the backdrop of the Occupation of Japan and the Anpo protests. The story follows the CID (Criminal Investigation Division), which existed to investigate crimes committed by American servicemen in Japan. CID is staffed by both American and Japanese nationals, though the Japanese members feel conflicted about their roles in the organization.

Akiyama, a former teacher who has become CID's chief interpreter, is ordered by his new boss, Lieutenant Pollack, to reopen a cold case from the previous year, in which Sergeant Major Limit was found drowned in Tokyo Bay. When Limit's body was discovered, the U.S. military repatriated his corpse to America (preventing an autopsy from taking place), ignored the Japanese police, took their files and announced the incident as an accidental death after an internal investigation. However, Pollack was friends with the man, and wants to find out what happened to him. Akiyama, whose beloved wife was raped and murdered by an American soldier (with the military classifying it as an accidental death), takes the case. He teams up with reporter Harashima, who is pursuing his own investigation of the incident.

Together, they discover that Limit was investigating a counterfeiting ring just before his death, and that the press used to print the money has disappeared. They also find that the counterfeiting press had originally belonged to a Japanese spy agency, and after the Occupation began, it was taken by a mysterious group (identified by Akiyama as American by the type of equipment they left behind). The press' engineer, former Major Ishūin, has also disappeared.

Akiyama visits Ishūin's only daughter, Kazuko. She says that her father was taken by an unknown man a few years ago. The man, calling himself Kurusawa, threatened Ishūin's family to keep them quiet. Harashima connects Kurusawa to the organization that stole the counterfeiting press, known only as the Spy Agency.

The scope of the conspiracy becomes clearer, as Akiyama discovers that the Spy Agency is enmeshed with former Imperial officers (protected from war crimes prosecution by the Americans) and Japanese industrialists. It is also involved in arms dealing (as part of military buildup for the Vietnam War), the Far East drug trade, and numerous suspicious railway incidents.

A few days later, one of Akiyama and Harashima's informants is found drowned. Meanwhile, Pollack orders Akiyama to stop the investigation, but he ignores his orders and secretly continues pursuing the case. Years pass with no new revelations.

Eventually, Akiyama hears from Captain Spencer that a man matching the description of Ishūin was spotted in Okinawa, identifying himself as "Chen Yangcheng". Akiyama flies to Okinawa to confront him, but he is killed under mysterious circumstances along with Ishūin. The Occupation authorities, after an internal investigation, close the case without identifying a suspect. Harashima vows to continue the investigation, but no new information is ever uncovered.

== Cast ==
- Jukichi Uno as Akiyama
- Izumi Ashikawa as Kazuko Ishūin
- Hideaki Nitani as Harashima
- Mizuho Suzuki as Kurosaki
- Shosei Muto as Miyakawa
- Eiken Shoji as Kawakita
- Mamoru Hirata as Hattori
- Hideji Ōtaki as Karasawa
- Tsutomu Shimomoto as Superintendent General of the Metropolitan Police
- Toshiaki Itō as Samuel's attorney
- Toshinosuke Nagao as Major Ishūin
- Yoko Benisawa as Aunt Toyo
- Fujiko Kimura as Atsuko Kobayashi
- Sumie Sasaki as Eiko
- Michio Hino as Narusawa
- Rie Maki as Satoe Akiyama
- Yasue Nishihara as Kayoko Shiina
- Chigusa Takayama as Former maid of Sergeant Major Limit
- Yōko Yokota as Kurosaki's wife
- Hiromi Katō as Sasaki's eldest daughter
- Yū Izumi as Nakano
- Ei Shirai as Man A
- Takashi Koshiba as Reporter A
- Takeo Ono as Elementary school janitor
- Mamoru Tsuyuki as Reporter B
- Tsugio Nakayama as Natsuo Tsukamoto
- Fusako Aihara as Kazuko
- Ikuo Nikaido as Sasaki's eldest son
- Harold Conway as K. Robert (credited as Harold S. Conway)
- Gunter Braun as Louis Samuel (credited as Gunter Brown)
- Jacques Enghien as Kirk Hudson (credited as S. Ungan)
- Gunter Smith as J. Pollack
- F. Bruno as Spencer
- Charlie Johnson as Karaphane E. Limit
- S. Winger as Bruno Baudouin
- Teresa Hoang as English Teacher
- Tanie Kitabayashi as Kikuko Sasaki
- Asao Sano as Sasaki
- Taketoshi Naito as Hidaka
- Kazuo Kitamura as Narrator (voice)
- Hiroshi Chō
- Keisuke Yukioka
- Yoshio Tsuchida
- Yoshi Katō

== Background ==
Yoshihara's novel was originally published in 1963 by San-Ichi Shobo Publishing Inc.

== Release ==
A Chain of Islands was theatrically released by Nikkatsu on 26 May 1965, in Japan. It was also shown at the Melbourne International Film Festival, as well as the Moscow International Film Festival.

The film was released to Region 2 DVD on 14 December 2007, individually and as part of a Kumai Nikkatsu box set.

== Reception ==
In a retrospective review for Windows on Worlds, Hayley Scanlon wrote that Kumai was "among the most fearless of directors, ready to confront the most unpleasant or taboo aspects of contemporary Japan." She said that the Anpo protests were a major background element of the film, and that Kumai used the story to condemn American forces "actively [facilitating] organised crime at an interstate level to further the progress of Capitalism". Despite its bleak outlook for the protagonists, Scanlon believed that the film's ending is hopeful, as it shows the characters "[dedicating] themselves to equipping the young with the tools to build a happier, fairer world in contrast to the one they seem primed to inherit from those who should know better".

== Awards and nominations ==
16th Blue Ribbon Awards

- Won: Best Newcomer (Kei Kumai)

39th Kinema Junpo Best Ten Awards

- Won: Best Screenplay (Kei Kumai)
- Best Ten List: 3rd place

6th Japan Film Directors Association Awards

- Won: Newcomer Award (Kei Kumai)
