= Kenju burai-chō series =

- Directed by: Haruyasu Noguchi
- Starring: Keiichirō Akagi; Joe Shishido; Sayuri Yoshinaga
- Distributed by: Nikkatsu
- Country: Japan
- Language: Japanese

Kenju burai-chō series (Japanese: 拳銃無頼帖シリーズ) are Japanese film series directed by Haruyasu Noguchi, who was most famous for directing Gappa: The Triphibian Monster. The lead star is Keiichirō Akagi. He played skilled gunman in the series. Based on Rei Kido's novel Nuki Uchi Sansirō.

== Kenju burai-chō Nukiuchino Ryu ==
(Release date 1960, February 14, Running time 86 minutes, Screen play by Gan Yamazaki)

- Keiichirō Akagi as Kenzaki Ryu
- Joe Shishido as Korto no Gin
- Ruriko Asaoka as Ishii Midori
- Ichiro Sugai as Shizu
- Kaku Takashina as Gen
- Arihiro Fujimura as Cho
- Kō Nishimura as Yo Sangen

== Kenju burai-chō Denkō Setsuka no Otoko ==
(Release date 1960, May 14, Running time 86 minutes, Screenplay by Takeo Matsura)

- Keiichirō Akagi as Jōji
- Ruriko Asaoka as Keiko
- Hideaki Nitani as Otsu Noboru
- Mari Shiraki as JIna Nakagawa
- Kaku Takanashi as Tatsukichi
- Sayuri Yoshinaga as Setsuko

== Kenju burai-chō Futeki ni Warauotoko ==
(Release date 1960, August 6, Running time 84 minutes, Screen play by Gan Yamazaki)

- Keiichirō Akagi as Dan Ryujirō
- Reiko Sasamori as Saeki Hiroko
- Joe Shishido as Korto no Ken
- Kyōji Aoyama as Mishima Gorō
- Sayuri Yoshinaga as Dan Noriko
- Shōki Fukae as Tetsu

== Kenju burai-chō Asunaki Otoko ==
(Release date 1960, December 3, Running time 85 minutes, Screen play by Takeo Matsura)

- Keiichirō Akagi as Dan Ryujirō
- Reiko Sasamori as Arimura Michiko
- Joe Shishido as Korto no Joe
- Eiji Gō as Mishima
- Yōko Minamida as Sumi

== Other adaptations ==
- Nukiuchi no Ryu Kenju no Uta (April 4, 1964) Starring Hideki Takahashi
- Kenju burai-chō Nagaremono no Mure (January 15, 1965) Starring Akira Kobayashi
