= Yōko Minamida =

Japanese actress (1933–2009)

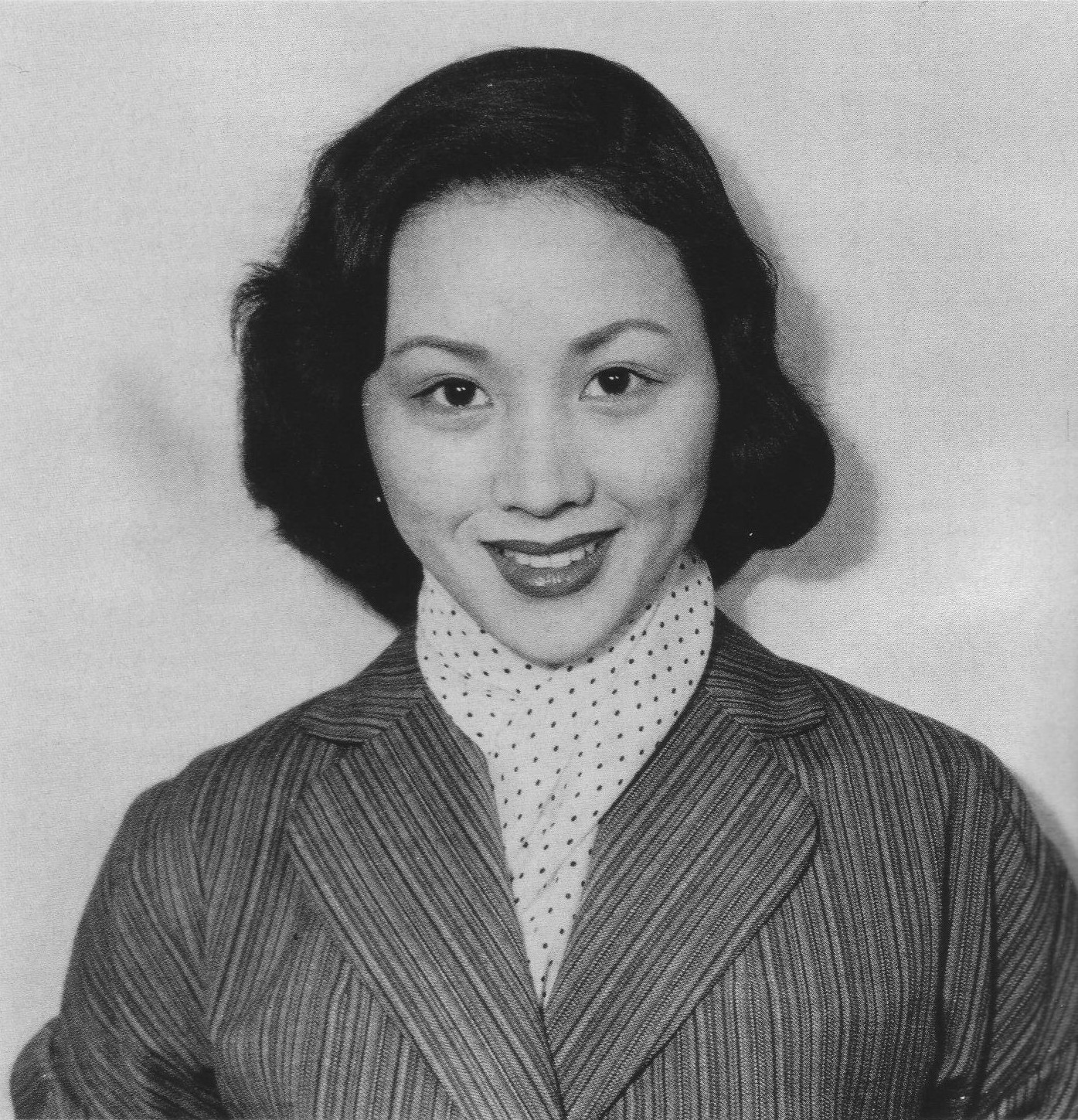
- Minamida in 1954
- Born: March 1, 1933; Shiba, Minato-ku, Tokyo, Japan
- Died: October 19, 2009 (aged 76); Japan
- Occupation: Actress
- Years active: 1952–2006
- Spouse: Hiroyuki Nagato (m. 1961–2009)

Yōko Minamida (南田 洋子, Minamida Yōko; March 1, 1933 – October 21, 2009) was a Japanese actress. She was diagnosed with Alzheimer's disease in November 2008, and a television documentary was made about her condition and the efforts of her husband, actor Hiroyuki Nagato, to care for her. She died in Tokyo.

== Selected filmography ==
Her filmography includes 140 films.

- Himitsu (1952) - Eiko
- Jūdai no yūwaku (1953) - Fusae Nishikawa
- Zoku Jûdai no seiten (1953) - Akiko Yasutomi
- Zoku zoku Jûdai no seiten (1953) - Setsuko Azabu
- Yonin no haha (1954)
- Kimimachi-bune (1954) - Kyôko Tazaki
- The Crucified Lovers (1954) - Otama
- Bara ikutabika (1955) - Mitsuko Matsushima
- Princess Yang Kwei-Fei (1955) - Hung-tao
- Sara no hana no toge (1955) - Toshiko Takenaka
- Haha naki ko (1955) - Tomiko
- Tokyo baka odori (1956)
- Season of the Sun (1956) - Eiko Takeda
- Waga machi (1956)
- Tonari no yome (1956)
- Ueru tamashii (1956) - Reiko Shiba
- Hungry Soul, Part II (1956) - Reiko Shiba
- Tange Sazen: Kenun no maki (1956)
- Otemba san'nin shimai: Odoru taiyô (1957)
- Sun in the Last Days of the Shogunate (1957) - Koharu, the prostitute
- Bitoku no yoromeki (1957) - Woman looks like an actress
- Shori-sha (1957)
- Kokoro to nikutai no tabi (1958) - Naomi Inamura
- Nusumareta yokujô (1958) - Chidori Yamamura
- Ginza no sabaku (1958) - Rika Kusunoki
- Kagenaki koe (1958) - Asako Takahashi
- Shî no kâbe no dâsshutsû (1958)
- Onna o wasurero (1959) - Yukie
- Kyo ni ikiru (1959)
- Sekai o kakeru koi (1959) - Kaoru Nonomura
- Yuganda tsuki (1959) - Namiko Eda
- Nangoku Tosa o ato ni shite (1959) - Hamako
- Jigoku no magarikado (1959) - Takako
- Nirenjû no tetsu (1959)
- Kizû tsukeru yajû (1959)
- Kizû darakê no ôkite (1960)
- Yakuza no uta (1960) - Yumi Kitano
- Wataridori itsu mata kaeru
- Chizu no naimachi (1960)
- Umi no joji ni kakero (1960) - Yuriko Kwamura
- Kenju burai-chō Asunaki Otoko (1960) - Sumi
- Ippiki ôkami (1960)
- Daisogen no wataridori (1960)
- Pigs and Battleships (1961) - Katsuyo
- Tokyo naito (1961)
- Hayauchi yarô (1961) - Dancer Jane
- Rokudenashi kagyo (1961)
- Sandanju no otoko (1961)
- Akai kôya (1961) - Sakie Yazaki
- Kachan umi ga shitteru yo (1961)
- Yôjinbo kagyô (1961)
- Nosappu no jô (1961)
- Otoko to otoko no ikiru machi (1962) - Emi Iwasaki
- Moeru minamijûjisei (1962) - Akemi
- Wataridori kokyô e kaeru (1962) - Misato Matsuyama
- Ore ni kaketa yatsura (1962)
- Garasu no Jonî: Yajû no yô ni miete (1962) - Yumi
- Aoi sanmyaku (1963) - Umetaro
- Samurai no ko (1963)
- Taiyo e no dasshutsu (1963)
- Izu no odoriko (1963) - Osaki
- Kiriko no tango (1963) - Tae
- Kyuchan katana o nuite (1963)
- Keirin shônin gyôjyôki (1963) - Monoko Ban
- Okashina yatsu (1963) - Fujiko, Shuntô
- Ôre no senaka ni higa atarô (1963)
- Zoku Haikei Tenno Heika Sama (1964) - Miri
- Jakoman to Tetsu (1964)
- Narazumono (1964)
- Nihon kyôkaku-den (1964) - Kumeji
- Korosareta onna (1964)
- Kawachi zoro: kenja jamo (1964)
- Kawachi zoro: doke chichu (1964)
- Bakuto (1964)
- Nihon Kyokaku-den: naniwa-hen (1965)
- Irezumi (1965)
- Nihon Kyokaku-den: kanto-hen (1965)
- Kawachi zoro: abare cho (1965)
- Ankoku gai jingi (1965)
- Otoko no shôbu (1966)
- Jigoku no okite ni asu wa nai (1966) - Akemi
- Chieko-sho (1967) - Kazuko
- Nihon kyokaku-den: kirikomi (1967)
- Kigeki meoto zenzai (1968)
- Nihon zan kyôsen (1969)
- Nihon zankyô-den (1969)
- Bakuto hyakunin - ninkyodo (1969)
- Hiko shonen: Wakamono no toride (1970) - Fusa Morokoshi
- Junko intai kinen eiga: Kantô hizakura ikka (1972) - Maid
- Karafuto 1945 Summer Hyosetsu no mon (1974)
- Hana no kô-ni trio: Hatsukoi jidai (1975) - Keiko Yazawa
- Nihon no jingi (1977) - Toyoko
- House (1977) - Auntie Karei Hausu
- Furimukeba ai (1978) - Tomi Oguchi
- Mahiru nari (1978)
- Zerosen moyu (1984) - Ine Hamada
- Rimeinzu: Utsukushiki yuusha-tachi (1990) - Kiyo
- Yuki no Concerto (1991)
- Riyû (2004) - Kinue Ishida
- Ghost Shout (2005)
- 22 sai no wakare - Lycoris: Ha mizu hana mizu monogatari (2006) - (final film role)

== Television ==
- Suna no Shiro (1997) -- Aya Iwaki
