= Nishi Ginza Station =

1958 Japanese comedy film

- Film poster
- Directed by: Shohei Imamura
- Written by: Shohei Imamura
- Starring: Frank Nagai; Masahiko Shimazu; Hisano Yamaoka
- Cinematography: Kumenobu Fujioka
- Music by: Toshiro Mayuzumi
- Distributed by: Nikkatsu
- Release date: July 29, 1958
- Running time: 52 minutes
- Language: Japanese

Nishi Ginza Station (西銀座駅前, Nishi Ginza ekimae) is a 1958 Japanese film by director Shohei Imamura. This was Imamura's second film as director.

== Plot ==
This short comedy concerns the attempts by the henpecked husband of a drugstore manager to have an extramarital affair while his wife is away for the weekend. It is based on a popular song by Frank Nagai, who sings and narrates in the film.

== See also ==
- 1958 in film
