= Duck decoy =

Duck decoy is an ambiguous term which may be applied to:

- Duck decoy (structure), a device used to catch wildfowl consisting of a central pond and radiating water-filled arms
- Duck decoy (model), a model duck used to attract other ducks
