= Stolen Desire =

- DVD cover for Stolen Desire
- Directed by: Shōhei Imamura
- Written by: Toshiro Suzuki; Tōkō Kon
- Produced by: Kazu Ōtsuka
- Starring: Osamu Takizawa; Shinichi Yanagisawa; Hiroyuki Nagato; Kō Nishimura
- Cinematography: Kuratarō Takamura
- Edited by: Tadashi Nakamura
- Music by: Toshirō Mayuzumi
- Production company: Nikkatsu
- Distributed by: Nikkatsu
- Release date: May 20, 1958
- Running time: 92 minutes
- Language: Japanese

Stolen Desire (盗まれた欲情, Nusumareta yokujō) is a 1958 Japanese film directed by Shōhei Imamura. It was Imamura's debut as a director.

== Cast ==
- Osamu Takizawa as Taminosuke Yamamura
- Shinichi Yanagisawa as Ezaburo Yamamura
- Hiroyuki Nagato as Shinichi Kunida
- Kō Nishimura as Kanji Takada
- Toshio Takahara as Eisuke Katō
- Shojiro Ogasawara as Tominachiro Kobayashi
- Tomio Aoki
- Nobuo Kawakami as Policeman
- Hayao Takamura
