= PS Decoy =

1986-built Australian paddle steamer

- PS Decoy at Mends Street Jetty

History

Australia
- Name: PS Decoy
- Owner: WA Steamship Company
- Operator: WA Steamship Company
- Builder: Australian Ship Building Industries
- Launched: 1986
- Identification: Australian Ship No. 852383
- Status: in service

General characteristics
- Class & type: paddle steamer
- Propulsion: 1905 Ransome Sims and Jefferies twin cylinder steam engine
- Capacity: 230 passengers

PS Decoy / "The Decoy" is a privately owned paddle steamer used for river boat charters on the Swan River in Perth, Western Australia. Its designated home port is Fremantle, Western Australia. Built in 1986 in Fremantle, The Decoy is a replica of the original paddle steamer (the original was shipped in parts from Scotland to Melbourne for assembly in the 1870's, before she eventually sailed to the Swan River).

She was used in the filming of the television mini-series Cloudstreet, which was based on Tim Winton's novel.

== History ==
The Decoy was built by Australian Ship Building Industries in Fremantle in 1986, a replica of the original paddle steamer that sailed from Eastern Australia to the Swan River and return in the 1870s. Many artefacts from the original Decoy were donated including the brass bell, brass fire extinguishers and port / starboard lights (all now ornamental). The vessel is designed and engineered for ocean cruising, making her one of only two remaining paddle steamers in operation that are designed for sea going operation. The Decoy now primarily operates on the smooth waters of The Swan River. The vessel was significantly refurbished in 2024 under the stewardship of a Western Australian family, and is available for corporate functions, private charters and events.

== Engines ==
Decoy is powered by a 1905 Ransome Sims and Jefferies twin cylinder steam engine, which was salvaged and restored from Bunnings engineering workshops in Manjimup. The engine was totally rebuilt in 1986 with a new oil fired burner and maxitherm boiler fitted.

== Service ==
Decoy is registered in Fremantle and is berthed at the Mends Street Jetty in South Perth. Swan River cruises take the form of private boat charter, being corporate and private functions (Christmas parties, staff parties, birthday parties, memorial services), weddings and publicly ticketed events. Day time discos, Sunday afternoon jazz - and other styles of music).

Operation of the vessel is conducted without the support of public funds and charitable donations, hence relies on revenue from private hire to keep the vessel in operation.
