= Frank Nagai =

Japanese singer (1932–2008)

- フランク 永井
- Born: Kiyoto Nagai (永井 清人); March 18, 1932
- Died: October 27, 2008 (aged 76)
- Occupation: Singer

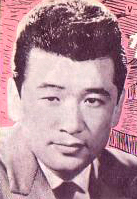
Frank Nagai in 1957.

Frank Nagai (フランク 永井; March 18, 1932 – October 27, 2008) was a Japanese singer. Known for his attractive baritone voice. His real name was Kiyoto Nagai (永井 清人 Nagai Kiyoto).

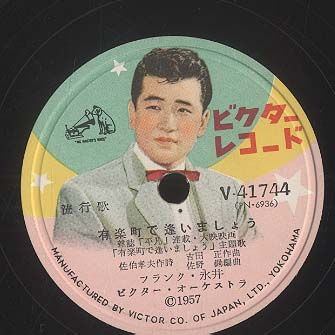
Image at vinyl record for Yūrakuchō de Aimashō (1957) featuring Frank Nagai.

== Life ==
Frank Nagai was born in Matsuyama, Miyagi, Japan. He had his major debut in 1954 when he was discovered by composer Tadashi Yoshida (吉田 正). He had many hit songs such as "Yurakucho de Aimasho", "Tokyo Night Club", "Kimi Koishi", and "Omae ni". He also appeared in motion pictures, including the film Nishi Ginza Eki Mae (1958), for which he sang the title song.

He enjoyed immense popularity as a singer in Japan. He is credited with discovering female singer Kazuko Matsuo (松尾 和子), who later became quite famous. The two often sang duets together.

He attempted suicide on October 21, 1985, attempting to hang himself, distressed that his lover bore his illegitimate child. He survived, but was left with permanent brain damage.

== Notable songs ==
- "Yūrakuchō de Aimashō" (有楽町で逢いましょう; "Lovers in Yurakucho" a.k.a. "Let's Meet in Yurakuchô") (1957)
- "Nishi-ginza ekimae" (西銀座駅前; "Nishi Ginza Station") (1958)
- "Tokyo Gozen Sanji" (東京午前三時; "Tokyo of 3:00AM") (1958)
- "Tokyo Night Club" (東京ナイト・クラブ) (1959)
- "Kimi Koishi" (君恋し, "I yearn for you") (1961)
- "Kiriko no Tango" (霧子のタンゴ, "Kiriko's Tango") (1962)
- "Osaka Roman" (大阪ろまん) (1966)
- "Omae Ni" (おまえに, For you) (1972)
- "Sixteen Tons" (cover song)
