= HMS Decoy =

At least six vessels of the British Royal Navy have been named HMS Decoy.

- HMS Decoy (1810), the name vessel for her three-vessel class of cutter; the French captured her in 1814
- HMS Decoy (1856), a Cheerful-class gunboat broken up in 1869 at Haslar
- HMS Decoy (1871), a gunboat launched in 1871 and sold in 1885.
- HMS Decoy (1894), a torpedo boat destroyer launched in 1894 and sunk in a collision in 1904.
- HMS Decoy (H75), a D-class destroyer launched in 1932 and transferred to the Royal Canadian Navy in 1943 as HMCS Kootenay (H75), then broken up in 1946.
- Decoy, a destroyer ordered in 1945, the order being canceled January 1946
- HMS Decoy (D106), a Daring-class destroyer launched in 1949 and sold to the Peruvian Navy in 1970 as BAP Ferré (DM-74), decommissioned in 2007. She was originally to have been named Dragon.
