= Shōhei Imamura =

Japanese film director (1926–2006)

- 今村昌平
- Born: 15 September 1926; Tokyo, Empire of Japan
- Died: 30 May 2006 (aged 79); Tokyo, Japan
- Education: Waseda University
- Occupations: Film director, screenwriter, producer
- Years active: 1951–2002
- Movement: Japanese New Wave
- Awards: Palme d'Or (1983, 1997)

Shōhei Imamura (今村昌平, Imamura Shōhei; 15 September 1926 – 30 May 2006) was a Japanese film director. His main interest as a filmmaker lay in the depiction of the lower strata of Japanese society. A key figure in the Japanese New Wave, who continued working into the 21st century, Imamura is the only director from Japan to win two Palme d'Or awards, doing so with The Ballad of Narayama (1983) and The Eel (1997).

== Biography ==
=== Early life ===
Imamura was born to an upper-middle-class doctor's family in Tokyo in 1926. For a short time following the end of the war, Imamura participated in the black market selling cigarettes and liquor. He studied Western history at Waseda University, but spent more time participating in theatrical and political activities. He cited a viewing of Akira Kurosawa's Rashomon in 1950 as an early inspiration, and said he saw it as an indication of the new freedom of expression possible in Japan in the post-war era.

Upon graduation from Waseda in 1951, Imamura began his film career working as an assistant to Yasujirō Ozu at Shochiku Studios on films like Early Summer and Tokyo Story. Imamura was uncomfortable with the image of Japanese society portrayed in Ozu's films, as well as with his rigid directing of actors, although he later admitted that he profited from his apprenticeship for Ozu in terms of gaining technical knowledge. While Imamura's films were to have a quite different style from Ozu's, Imamura, like Ozu, was to focus on what he saw as particularly Japanese elements of society in his films. "I've always wanted to ask questions about the Japanese, because it's the only people I'm qualified to describe," he said. He expressed surprise that his films were appreciated overseas, even doubting that they could be understood.

=== Studio director ===
Imamura left Shochiku in 1954 to join the Nikkatsu studios, where he worked as an assistant director to Yūzō Kawashima. According to Donald Richie, Imamura shared with Kawashima an interest in depicting the "real" Japan with its "uncivilized", amoral protagonists, in opposition to the "official" version as depicted in the films of Ozu, Mizoguchi Kenji, and late career Kurosawa. He also co-wrote the screenplay to Kawashima's Sun in the Last Days of the Shogunate, and much later edited a book about Kawashima, entitled Sayonara dake ga jinsei da.

In 1958, Imamura made his directorial debut at Nikkatsu, Stolen Desire, about a travelling theater troupe which combines kabuki with striptease, a film which, according to Jonathan Rosenbaum, "characteristically finds some vitality in vulgarity". He continued to direct films the studio had assigned him to, including Nishi Ginza Station, a comedy based on a Frankie Nagai pop song, and the black comedy Endless Desire. These three "were studio assignments, and have rarely been screened outside of Japan".

In 1959, My Second Brother, which portrayed a community of zainichi in a poor mining town, was described by Alexander Jacoby as an "uncharacteristically tender film".

His 1961 satire Pigs and Battleships, which Imamura later said was the kind of film he had always wanted to make, depicted black market trades between the U.S. military and the local underworld at Yokosuka. Due to the film's controversial nature and Imamura's overrunning production time and costs, Nikkatsu did not allow Imamura to direct another project for two years, forcing him to concentrate on screenwriting. He followed this hiatus with the 1963 The Insect Woman, which was shown in competition at the Berlin International Film Festival, and the 1964 Unholy Desire. All three films presented female protagonists who were survivors, persevering despite misfortunes. Imamura disliked the self-sacrificing women portrayed in films like Mizoguchi's The Life of Oharu and Mikio Naruse's Floating Clouds, arguing that "they don't really exist...My heroines are true to life".

=== Independent filmmaker ===
In 1965, Imamura established his own production company, Imamura Productions. His first independent feature was a free adaptation of a novel by Akiyuki Nosaka, The Pornographers (1966), which is nowadays regarded as one of his best-known films in the West. In 1967, he followed with the pseudo-documentary A Man Vanishes, which, while following a woman searching for her missing fiancé, increasingly blurred the line between non-fiction and fiction. His 1968 film Profound Desires of the Gods investigated the clash between modern and traditional societies on a southern Japanese island. One of Imamura's more ambitious and costly projects, this film's poor box-office performance led to a retreat back into smaller productions, causing him to direct a series of documentaries over the next decade, often for Japanese television.

History of Postwar Japan as Told by a Bar Hostess and Karayuki-san, the Making of a Prostitute were two of these projects, both focusing on one of his favorite themes: Strong women who survive on the periphery of Japanese society. Two others followed Japanese ex-soldiers in Malaysia and Thailand reluctant to returning home, and speaking openly about their past war crimes on camera.

Imamura returned to fiction with the 1979 Vengeance Is Mine, based on the true story of serial killer Akira Nishiguchi. Two large-scale remakes followed, Eijanaika (1981), a re-imagining of Sun in the Last Days of the Shogunate, and The Ballad of Narayama (1983), a re-telling of Keisuke Kinoshita's 1958 The Ballad of Narayama. For the latter, Imamura received his first Palme d'Or at the 1983 Cannes Film Festival.

Black Rain (1989) portrayed the effect of the bombing of Hiroshima on a family years after the incident. Film scholar Alexander Jacoby discovered an uncommon, "almost Ozu-like quietism" in this film. The Eel (1997) again secured Imamura a Palme d'Or, this time shared with Abbas Kiarostami's Taste of Cherry.

Starting with The Eel, Imamura's eldest son Daisuke Tengan worked on the screenplays of his films, including Imamura's contribution to the anthology film 11'09"01 September 11 (2002), his last directorial effort. In 2002, Imamura played the role of a historian in the South Korean film 2009: Lost Memories. Daisuke Tengan also wrote the script for the 2026 film Bad Lieutenant: Tokyo.

Imamura died on 30 May 2006, aged 79.

== Themes ==
Seeing himself as a cultural anthropologist, Imamura stated, "I like to make messy films", and "I am interested in the relationship of the lower part of the human body and the lower part of the social structure on which the reality of daily Japanese life supports itself...I ask myself what differentiates humans from other animals. What is a human being? I look for the answer by continuing to make films".

== Legacy ==
Imamura founded the Japan Institute of the Moving Image (日本映画大学) as the Yokohama Vocational School of Broadcast and Film (Yokohama Hōsō Eiga Senmon Gakkō) in 1975. While a student at this school, director Takashi Miike was given his first film credit as assistant director on Imamura's 1987 film Zegen.

== Filmography (selected) ==
All films are as director except where otherwise noted.

Year	Title	Director	Writer	Producer	Notes
1956	The Balloon	No	Yes	No	Also second assistant director
1957	Sun in the Last Days of the Shogunate	No	Yes	No	Also assistant director
1958	Stolen Desire	Yes	No	No	
1958	Nishi Ginza Station	Yes	Yes	No	
1958	Endless Desire	Yes	Yes	No	
1959	My Second Brother	Yes	Yes	No	
1961	Pigs and Battleships	Yes	No	No	
1962	Foundry Town	No	Yes	No	
1963	Samurai no ko	No	Yes	No	
1963	Keirin shōnin gyōjyōki	No	Yes	No	
1963	The Insect Woman	Yes	Yes	No	
1964	Unholy Desire	Yes	Yes	No	
1966	The Pornographers	Yes	Yes	Yes	
1967	A Man Vanishes	Yes	No	Yes	
1968	Neon taheiki	No	Yes	No	
1968	Higashi Shinakai	No	Yes	Yes	
1968	Profound Desires of the Gods	Yes	Yes	No	
1968	East China Sea	No	Yes	No	
1970	History of Postwar Japan as Told by a Bar Hostess	Yes	Yes	No	Television documentary
1971	In Search of the Unreturned Soldiers in Malaysia	Yes	No	No	Television documentary
1971	In Search of the Unreturned Soldiers in Thailand	Yes	No	Yes	Television documentary
1972	The Pirates of Bubuan	Yes	Yes	No	Television documentary
1973	Outlaw-Matsu Comes Home	Yes	No	No	Television documentary
1975	Karayuki-san, the Making of a Prostitute	Yes	No	No	Television documentary
1976	The Youth Killer	No	No	Yes	
1979	Vengeance Is Mine	Yes	No	No	Japan Academy Film Prize for Picture of the Year; Japan Academy Film Prize for Director of the Year
1981	Eijanaika	Yes	Yes	Yes	
1983	The Ballad of Narayama	Yes	Yes	No	Palme d'Or; Japan Academy Film Prize for Picture of the Year
1986	Have You Seen the Barefoot God?	No	No	Yes	
1987	The Emperor's Naked Army Marches On	No	No	Associate	Documentary
1987	Zegen	Yes	Yes	No	
1989	Black Rain	Yes	Yes	Executive	Japan Academy Film Prize for Picture of the Year; Japan Academy Film Prize for Director of the Year; Technical Grand Prize of the Cannes Film Festival
1997	The Eel	Yes	Yes	No	Palme d'Or; Japan Academy Film Prize for Director of the Year
1998	Dr. Akagi	Yes	Yes	No	
2001	Warm Water Under a Red Bridge	Yes	Yes	No	
2002	11'09"01 September 11	Yes	Yes	No	Anthology film episode "Japan"
