= Pigs and Battleships =

- Japanese theatrical poster
- Directed by: Shōhei Imamura
- Written by: Hisashi Yamanouchi
- Produced by: Kano Ōtsuka
- Starring: Jitsuko Yoshimura; Yōko Minamida; Hiroyuki Nagato
- Cinematography: Shinsaku Himeda
- Edited by: Mutsuo Tanji
- Music by: Toshirō Mayuzumi
- Production company: Nikkatsu
- Distributed by: Nikkatsu (Japan); European Producers International (U.S.)
- Release date: 21 January 1961 (Japan)
- Running time: 108 minutes
- Country: Japan
- Language: Japanese

Pigs and Battleships (Japanese: 豚と軍艦, Hepburn: Buta to gunkan) is a 1961 Japanese satirical comedy film by director Shōhei Imamura. The film depicts black market trades between the U.S. military and the local underworld at Yokosuka.

== Plot ==
Kinta, a member of the Himori Yakuza, has been put in charge of the gang's pork distribution; his girlfriend Haruko works at a bar. When Kinta goes to visit Haruko one afternoon, she leaves without speaking to him, and Kinta finds out through her sister that Haruko is being paid 30,000 yen to go on a date with an American businessman (and that her mother has already spent the money). Haruko returns to Kinta later that night, although Kinta is unhappy because of the earlier events. Haruko reveals that she is pregnant and expresses her concerns about Kinta’s work.

The gang calls on Kinta early in the morning, and they go out on a boat to dispose of the body of a man who ran afoul of Himori. One of the other gangsters asks Kinta to consider being the fall guy, and Kinta reluctantly agrees. Haruko gets an abortion, and the doctor charges Kinta extra knowing that the Yakuza have money. A few days later, the body from the boat washes up on the wharf and is found by Kinta’s father. Kinta and his boss hide the body before Kinta’s father returns with the police, but Kinta’s father notices that Kinta’s feet are dirty and figures out that Kinta hid the body, leading to a fight. Haruko pushes Kinta to leave the gang and run away with her, but Kinta refuses because he does not want to be a “wage slave”.

Meanwhile, one of the gangsters, Ohachi, is tasked with disposing of the body by burying it on the pig farm. Kinta’s boss, Tetsuji, gets angry with the other gangsters when he finds out that they set Kinta up as the fall guy without consulting him, and it is revealed that the “big boss”, Himori, has some doubts about Tetsuji. Tetsuji calls for a celebration, where they drink, play games and cook one of the pigs. As they are eating the pig, Ohachi reveals that he was too lazy to bury the body so he simply boiled it and put it into the pig feed, which disgusts the other gangsters. Tetsuji, who is ill, becomes so sick that he has to go to hospital. Kinta finds out that his boss only has three days to live, information that Tetsuji forces out of him. Tetsuji is distraught and pays a gangster named Wang to kill him at some point in the future.

Haruko, increasingly frustrated with Kinta, goes to a nightclub. She is shown at a hotel with three American sailors, all of whom are loud and drunk. In a moment of clarity she tries to leave but is stopped and raped by the sailors. Afterwards, she attempts to escape with the Americans' money but is caught and taken to jail. The next day, her family retrieves her, and she agrees to become the mistress of the American according to her mother’s wishes. Meanwhile, the Himori gang is in financial trouble. Kinta and a few other gangsters agree to load the pigs on trucks that night and take the money for themselves. Kinta goes to wait at the pig farm and finds Haruko, and the two agree to run away together after Kinta sells the pigs.

At night, Himori arrives before Kinta’s friends and loads the pigs onto trucks of his own, also beating up Kinta and loading him onto a truck. Kinta’s friends arrive in time to see Himori leaving and follow them downtown. Himori and Kinta's friends reach an agreement and decide once again to make Kinta the fall guy. However, Kinta refuses this time and uses a rifle he discovered earlier on the truck to ward off the other gangsters. Tetsuji shows up, having discovered earlier that there was a medical mix-up and that he only has a mild ulcer, but the arrival of Wang causes him to flee, although he is in no danger because Wang has discovered that he was paid in counterfeit money and will therefore not kill him. Kinta orders the truck drivers to release all of the pigs. He is shot by one of the gangsters; after he returns fire, the terrified pigs stampede through the streets, ultimately resulting in the deaths of the remaining Himori members. Haruko, who had agreed to meet Kinta at the train station, overhears that there is Yakuza infighting downtown. She rushes there, only to find that Kinta has died from his gunshot wound.

In the aftermath, days later, the American fleet is leaving for Okinawa. Haruko’s family is convinced that all things American will be of great benefit to her and, by extension, her family because she is vivacious and attractive. Her family helps her to prepare to leave with Gordon, the American businessman. However, she has decided otherwise and sets off to see her uncle, who has a job for her in Kawasaki. In the final scene, as she wipes the make-up and lipstick off her face and walks to the railway station, a new American aircraft carrier arrives in the port, and a crowd of young Japanese women excitedly calls and waves to the sailors coming onshore.

== Cast ==
- Hiroyuki Nagato - Kinta
- Jitsuko Yoshimura - Haruko
- Masao Mishima - Himori
- Tetsurō Tamba - Slasher Tetsuji
- Shirō Ōsaka - Hoshino
- Takeshi Katō - Ohachi
- Shōichi Ozawa - Gunji, Gangster in check shirt
- Yōko Minamida - Katsuyo
- Hideo Sato - Kikuo
- Toshio Takahara - Doctor Miyaguchi
- Eijirō Tōno - Kan'ichi
- Akira Yamauchi - Sakiyama
- Sanae Nakahara - Hiromi
- Kin Sugai - Haruko's mother
- Bumon Kahara - Harukoma

== Production ==
During the immediate post-war years, Imamura had been a black-market hustler himself. Imamura conducted extensive research for the film, spending time with gangsters whom he found to have a unique kind of pride and freedom. The gangsters teased Imamura for working hard but not having much money. Initially Imamura wanted 1,500 pigs for the climax of the film, but had to make do with 400 due to financial constraints. Due to the controversial nature of Pigs and Battleships, and Imamura's overrunning production time and costs, Nikkatsu banned Imamura from directing for two years, during which time he wrote screenplays.

== Reception and awards ==
Pigs and Battleships won the 1961 Blue Ribbon Award for Best Film.

In his 1986 review, Kevin Thomas of the Los Angeles Times described the plot as complex but with a simple message, a warning about cultural imperialism, and calls the climax hilarious and unique. Also in 1986, Vincent Canby of The New York Times too praised the climax and described the movie overall as "refreshingly impolite". John Berra, writing for Electric Sheep Magazine, described the film as a "biting social satire" and "cruelly entertaining".
