= My Second Brother =

- Directed by: Shōhei Imamura
- Written by: Ichirō Ikeda; Shohei Imamura; Sueko Yasumoto (book)
- Starring: Hiroyuki Nagato; Kayo Matsuo
- Cinematography: Shinsaku Himeda
- Edited by: Mutsuo Tanji
- Music by: Toshiro Mayuzumi
- Production company: Nikkatsu
- Distributed by: Nikkatsu
- Release date: October 28, 1959 (Japan)
- Running time: 101 minutes
- Language: Japanese

My Second Brother (にあんちゃん, Nianchan) is a 1959 Japanese drama film by Shōhei Imamura. The screenplay is based on the diary of ten-year-old zainichi (ethnic Korean Japanese) Sueko Yasumoto, which became a bestseller upon publication.

== Plot ==
The film tells the story of four orphans living in an impoverished mining town.

== Cast ==
- Hiroyuki Nagato as Kiichi Yasumoto, eldest brother
- Kayo Matsuo as Yoshiko, eldest sister
- Takeshi Okimura as Kōichi, second brother
- Akiko Maeda as Sueko, younger sister
- Kō Nishimura as Gorō Mitamura
- Yoshio Ōmori as Seki
- Toshio Takahara as shop assistant (bicycle shop)
- Taiji Tonoyama as Gengorō Henmi
- Shinsuke Ashida as Sakai
- Kazuko Yoshiyuki as Kanako Hori
- Shōichi Ozawa as Haruo Kanayama
- Natsuko Kahara as Kanako's mother

== Reception ==
Film scholar Alexander Jacoby called My Second Brother an "uncharacteristically tender film" for the director.

== Awards ==
- Mainichi Film Award – Best Supporting Actress (Kanako Hori), Best Sound (Fumio Hashimoto)
- Blue Ribbon Awards – Best Actor (Hiroyuki Nagato), Best Supporting Actor (Shōichi Ozawa)
