= Yuzo Kawashima =

Japanese film director (1918–1963)

Yūzō Kawashima
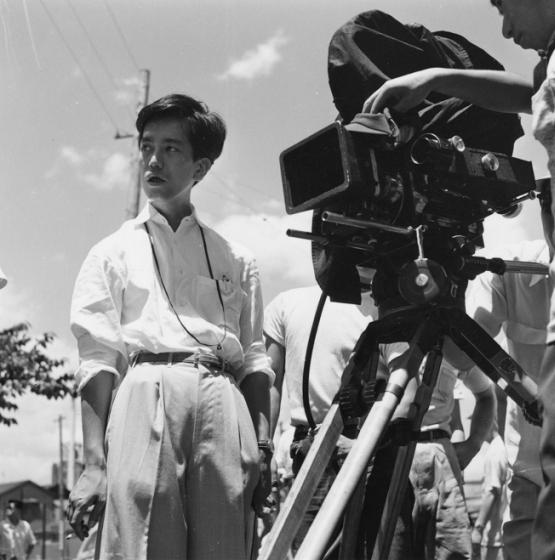
- Yūzō Kawashima
- Born: 4 February 1918; Mutsu, Shimokita District, Aomori Prefecture, Japan
- Died: 11 June 1963 (aged 45)
- Occupations: Film director, screenwriter
- Known for: Sun in the Last Days of the Shogunate

Yūzō Kawashima (川島雄三, Kawashima Yūzō; 4 February 1918 – 11 June 1963) was a Japanese film director and screenwriter known for his lively comedies.

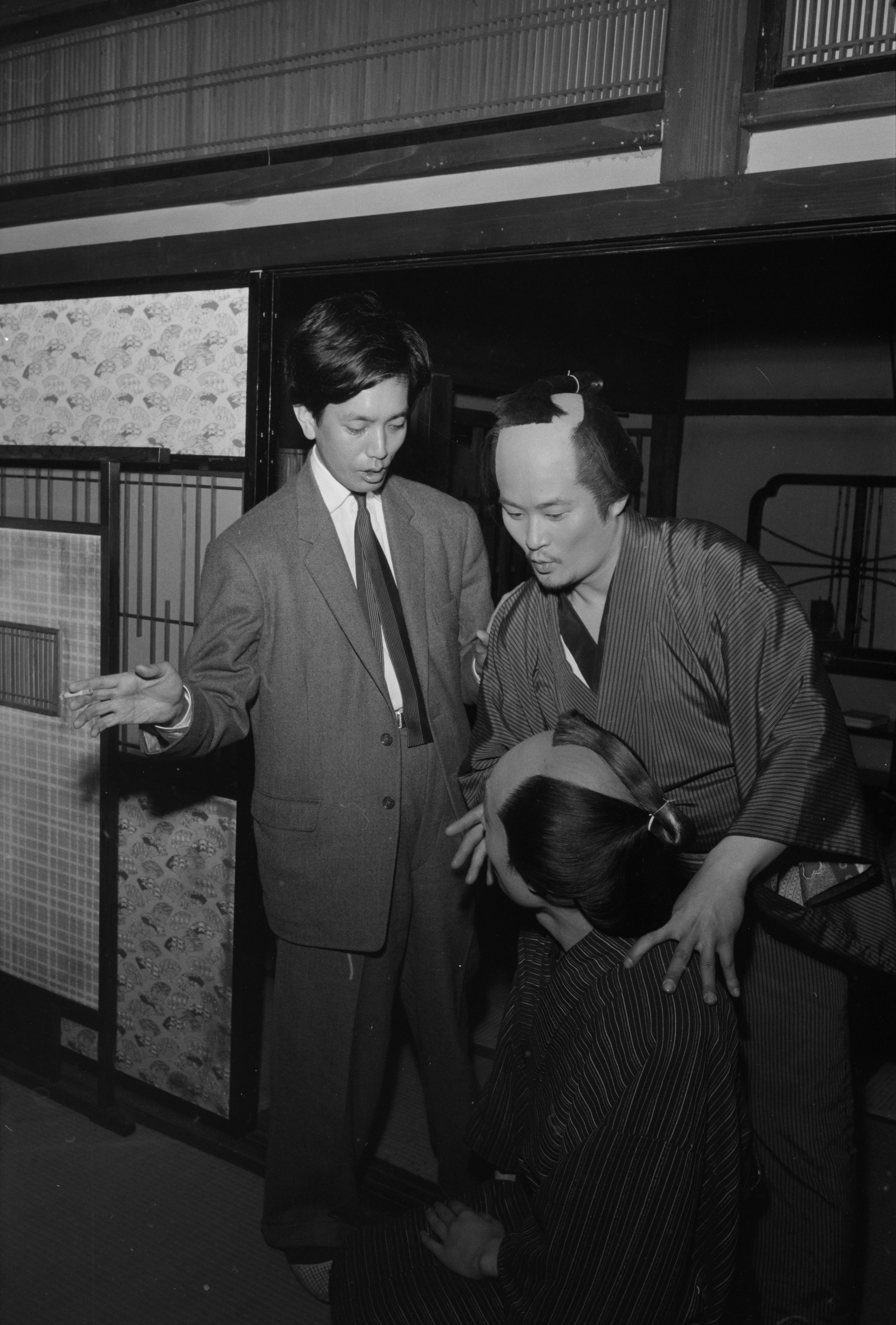
Yūzō Kawashima (left) during the shooting of Sun in the Last Days of the Shogunate

== Career ==
Kawashima was born in Mutsu, Shimokita District, Aomori Prefecture. After graduating from Meiji University's Department of Literature, he entered the Shōchiku studios and served as an assistant director under Minoru Shibuya, Yasujirō Shimazu, Hiroshi Shimizu and others. In 1944, he directed his first film, The Man Who Has Returned. After the war, Kawashima made many comedies at Shōchiku, but it was not before his move to Nikkatsu in 1955 that his work received critical acclaim. At Nikkatsu, he directed such notable works as Burden of Love (1955), Suzaki Paradise: Red Light District (1956, Kawashima's own personal favourite of his films), and Sun in the Last Days of the Shogunate (1957). In his remaining years, Kawashima worked at multiple studios—Daiei, Tokyo Eiga, and Toho—continuing to create satirical works like Temptation on Glamour Island (1959), Room for Let (1959), and The Graceful Brute (1962), as well as literary adaptations like A Geisha's Diary (1961) and The Temple of Wild Geese (1962).

Kawashima suffered from polio and was known as an excessive drinker. He died in 1963 at the age of 45, having completed 50 films during a career which spanned only 19 years.

== Legacy ==
Kawashima was a key influence on director Shōhei Imamura, who worked as his assistant director.

In 1999, Sun in the Last Days of the Shogunate was voted the fifth best Japanese film of all time in Kinema Junpō's poll of 140 film critics and filmmakers.

== Selected filmography ==
- 1944 The Man Who Has Returned (還って来た男)
- 1948 The Follower (追跡者)
- 1948 Oh Citizens! (市民諸君)
- 1952 Tonkatsu taishō (とんかつ大将)
- 1954 The Path of Sincerity (真実一路)
- 1953 Ojōsan shachō (お嬢さん社長)
- 1954 Between Yesterday and Tomorrow (昨日と明日の間)
- 1955 Burden of Love (愛のお荷物)
- 1955 Till We Meet Again (あした来る人)
- 1955 Tales of Ginza (銀座二十四帖)
- 1956 The Balloon (風船)
- 1956 Suzaki Paradise: Red Light (洲崎パラダイス 赤信号)
- 1956 Our Town (わが町)
- 1956 Hungry Soul (飢える魂)
- 1956 Hungry Soul, Part II (続 飢える魂)
- 1957 Sun in the Last Days of the Shogunate (幕末太陽傳)
- 1958 Woman Unveiled (女であること)
- 1958 Noren (暖簾)
- 1959 Temptation on Glamour Island (グラマ島の誘惑)
- 1959 Room for Let (貸間あり)
- 1960 The Flow of Evening (夜の流れ, aka The Lovelorn Geisha) (with Mikio Naruse)
- 1960 Soft Touch of Night (赤坂の姉妹 夜の肌)
- 1961 Romance Express (特急にっぽん)
- 1961 A Geisha's Diary (女は二度生まれる, aka Women Are Born Twice)
- 1962 The Temple of the Wild Geese (雁の寺)
- 1962 The Tale of the Blue Beka Boat (青べか物語)
- 1962 The Graceful Brute (しとやかな獣, aka Elegant Beast)
- 1962 Mount Hakone (箱根山)
