= Branded to Kill =

1967 film by Seijun Suzuki

- Theatrical release poster
- Directed by: Seijun Suzuki
- Written by: Hachiro Guryu (Note: Hachiro Guryu (具流八郎; lit. 'Group of Eight') is the collective pen name for Seijun Suzuki, Takeo Kimura, Atsushi Yamatoya, Yōzō Tanaka, Chūsei Sone, Yutaka Okada, Seiichirō Yamaguchi and Yasuaki Hangai.)
- Produced by: Kaneo Iwai
- Starring: Joe Shishido; Koji Nanbara; Annu Mari; Mariko Ogawa
- Cinematography: Kazue Nagatsuka
- Edited by: Mutsuo Tanji
- Music by: Naozumi Yamamoto
- Production company: Nikkatsu
- Distributed by: Nikkatsu
- Release date: June 15, 1967
- Running time: 91 minutes
- Country: Japan
- Language: Japanese
- Budget: ¥20 million

Branded to Kill (Japanese: 殺しの烙印, Hepburn: Koroshi no Rakuin) is a 1967 Japanese crime film directed by Seijun Suzuki and starring Joe Shishido, Koji Nanbara, Annu Mari and Mariko Ogawa. The story follows contract killer Goro Hanada as he is recruited by a mysterious woman named Misako for a seemingly impossible mission. When the mission fails, he is hunted by the phantom Number One Killer, whose methods threaten his life and sanity.

Branded to Kill was designated by its production company and distributor, Nikkatsu, as a low-budget B movie. Dissatisfied with the original script, the studio called in Suzuki to rewrite and direct the film shortly prior to the start of production. Suzuki came up with many of his ideas for the project the night before or on the set while filming, and welcomed ideas from his colleagues; the screenplay is credited to Hachiro Guryu, a writing collective that consisted of Suzuki and seven other writers, including his frequent collaborators Takeo Kimura and Atsushi Yamatoya. Suzuki gave the film a satirical, anarchic and visually eclectic bent, from which the studio had previously warned him away. The brief turnaround Suzuki was given to make Branded to Kill meant that post-production on the film was completed only a day before its pre-scheduled release on June 15, 1967.

The initial critical and commercial failure of Branded to Kill prompted Nikkatsu to ostensibly fire Suzuki for making "movies that make no sense and no money". In response, Suzuki successfully sued Nikkatsu, and garnered support from student groups, like-minded filmmakers and the general public, causing a major controversy throughout the Japanese film industry. Suzuki was blacklisted and did not make another feature film for a decade, but became a countercultural icon.

By the 1980s, Branded to Kill had gained a strong international cult following; film critics and enthusiasts now regard it as an absurdist masterpiece. It has been cited as an influence by filmmakers such as Jim Jarmusch, John Woo, Park Chan-wook, Quentin Tarantino and Nicolas Winding Refn, and composer John Zorn. Branded to Kill inspired a loose 1973 Roman Porno remake directed by Yamatoya, Trapped in Lust, and a loose 2001 sequel, Pistol Opera, directed by Suzuki for Nikkatsu. The company has also hosted two major retrospectives spotlighting his career.

== Plot ==
Goro Hanada, the Japanese underworld's third-ranked hitman, and his wife, Mami, fly into Tokyo and are met by Kasuga, a former hitman-turned-taxi driver. Hanada agrees to help Kasuga return to the underworld, and the three go to a club owned by yakuza boss Michihiko Yabuhara. The two men are hired to escort a client from Sagami Beach to Nagano. After the meeting, Yabuhara seduces Mami.

Driving their client towards his destination, Hanada spots an ambush and dispatches several gunmen. Panicking, Kasuga attacks one of the ambushers, Koh, the fourth-ranked hitman, resulting in both of their deaths. Hanada leaves the client to secure Koh's car but hears three gunshots. Rushing back, he finds the client safe, while three additional ambushers have been shot through their foreheads. At another ambush, Hanada kills more gunmen and sets Sakura, the second-ranked hitman, on fire; the client shoots Sakura dead. On his way home, Hanada's car breaks down. Misako, a mysterious woman with a deathwish, gives him a ride. At home, Hanada has rough sex with Mami, fuelled by his fetish for smelling boiling rice.

Hanada (right) demanding Misako buy him some rice. He uses the smell of boiling rice to achieve sexual arousal. Her apartment is decorated with dead butterflies which have been interpreted as symbolizing obsessive love.

Yabuhara hires Hanada to kill a customs officer, an ocularist and a jeweller. Hanada snipes the first from behind a billboard's animatronic cigarette lighter, shoots the second through a pipe drain when he leans over a sink, and blasts his way into the third's office, escaping on an advertising balloon. Misako then offers him a near-impossible contract to kill a foreigner. During the job, a butterfly lands on the barrel of his rifle, causing him to miss the target and kill a bystander. Misako tells Hanada that he will lose his rank and be killed. Preparing to leave Japan, he is shot by Mami, who sets fire to their apartment and flees. Hanada escapes, his belt buckle having stopped the bullet.

Reunited, Hanada and Misako alternate between failed attempts by him to seduce her and then to kill each other; she succumbs to his advances when he promises to kill her. Afterwards, Hanada realizes he loves Misako and is unable to kill her. Confused, he wanders the streets and passes out. The next day, he finds Mami at Yabuhara's club. She tries to seduce him, then fakes hysteria and tells him Yabuhara paid her to kill him and that the three men he had killed had stolen from Yabuhara's diamond smuggling operation, and the foreigner was an investigator sent by the supplier. Unmoved, Hanada kills her, gets drunk and waits for Yabuhara to return. Yabuhara arrives already dead with a bullet through his forehead.

Hanada returns to Misako's apartment, where a projected film shows her bound and tortured, and directs him to a breakwater, where he will be killed the following day. Hanada submits to the demand, but kills the assassins instead. The former client arrives, revealing himself to be the legendary Number One Killer. He intends to kill Hanada but, in thanks for his work, allows him a truce. As Hanada holes up in Misako's apartment, Number One taunts him with threatening phone calls and forbids him to leave the apartment. Eventually, Number One moves in with the now-exhausted Hanada under the pretext that he is deciding how to kill him. They set times to eat, sleep and, later, to link arms everywhere they go. Number One suggests they eat out one day, but disappears during the meal.

At the apartment, Hanada finds a note and another film from Number One, stating he will be waiting at a gymnasium with Misako. Hanada arrives at the gym, but Number One does not show. As Hanada prepares to leave, a tape recording explains that Number One exhausts his targets before killing them. Tying a headband across his forehead, Hanada climbs into a boxing ring. Number One appears and shoots him. The headband stops the bullet and Hanada returns fire; Number One manages to shoot him several times before dying. As Hanada triumphantly declares himself the new Number One, Misako enters the gym. Hanada instinctively shoots her dead, again declares himself Number One, then falls out of the ring.

== Cast ==
- Joe Shishido as Goro Hanada, the Number Three Killer: a hitman with a fetish for the smell of boiling rice. He is gainfully employed by the yakuza until a butterfly lands on the barrel of his rifle during a "Devil's job". He misses his target and is marked for death—then descends into a world of alcohol and paranoia. Shishido has been called the face of Suzuki's films, owing in part to their frequent collaborations, this being among the most prominent. After middling success in Nikkatsu melodramas he underwent plastic surgery, enlarging his cheeks several sizes. He returned to tremendous success as a heavy and, soon thereafter, a star.
- Koji Nanbara as the Number One Killer: the legendary hitman whose existence remains a subject of debate. Incognito, he employs the yakuza to provide bodyguards. Later, he reappears with the intention of killing Hanada, first trapping him in an apartment, then moving in with him, before their final showdown in a public gymnasium.
- Isao Tamagawa as Michihiko Yabuhara: the yakuza boss that hires Hanada and seduces his wife. Upon the discovery that his diamond smuggling operation has been burgled, he employs Hanada to execute the guilty parties then adds him to the list when he flubs the job. His final appearance is with a bullet hole in his head.
- Annu Mari as Misako Nakajo: the femme fatale with a penchant for dead butterflies and birds. She picks Hanada up in her open top convertible when his car breaks down in the rain. Under Yabuhara's direction she enlists him to kill a foreigner. She attempts to kill Hanada but falls in love with him, which instigates her capture and use as bait by Number One. Mari has said she was experiencing suicidal urges at the time she first read the script and the character captivated her. "I loved her name, but it was her first line 'My dream is to die' that had a profound impact on me. It was like lightning."
- Mariko Ogawa as Mami Hanada: Hanada's wife who has a predilection towards walking around the house nude. Shortly after meeting Yabuhara she enters an affair with him. When her husband's career sours she attempts mariticide and flees—to be confronted later at Yabuhara's club. This was Mariko Ogawa's only film appearance.
- Hiroshi Minami as Gihei Kasuga: formerly a ranked hitman who lost his nerve and took to drinking. After introducing Hanada to Yabuhara he joins the former in a dangerous chauffeur mission. His nerves get the better of him and he experiences a short-lived mental breakdown.

== Production ==
Nikkatsu conceived Branded to Kill as a low-budget hitman film, a subgenre of the studio's yakuza-oriented movies. Their standard B movie shooting schedule was applied, one week for pre-production, 25 days to shoot and three days for post-production. The budget was set at approximately 20 million yen. Shortly before filming began, with the release date already set, the script was deemed "inappropriate" by the head office and contract director Seijun Suzuki was brought in to do a rewrite. Studio head Kyūsaku Hori told Suzuki he had had to read it twice before he understood it. Suzuki suggested they drop the script but was ordered to proceed. The rewrite was done with his frequent collaborator Takeo Kimura and six assistant directors, including Atsushi Yamatoya (who also played Killer Number Four). The eight men had worked under the joint pen name Hachiro Guryu ("Group of Eight") since the mid-1960s. Nikkatsu was building leading man Joe Shishido into a star and assigned him to the film. They specified that the script was to be written with this aim. The film also marks Shishido's first nude scene. Suzuki originally wanted Kiwako Taichi, a new talent from the famous theatre troupe Bungakuza, for the female lead but she took a part in another film. Instead, Suzuki selected Annu Mari, another new actress who had been working in Nikkatsu's music halls. In casting the role of Hanada's wife, Suzuki selected Mariko Ogawa from outside of the studio as none of the contract actresses would do nude scenes.

Suzuki did not use storyboards and disliked pre-planning. He preferred to come up with ideas either the night before or on the set as he felt that the only person who should know what is going to happen is the director. He also felt that it was sudden inspiration that made the picture. An example is the addition of the Number Three Killer's rice-sniffing habit. Suzuki explained that he wanted to present a quintessentially "Japanese" killer, "If he were Italian, he'd get turned on by macaroni, right?" Suzuki has commended Shishido on his similar drive to make the action scenes as physical and interesting as possible. In directing his actors, Suzuki let them play their roles as they saw fit and only intervened when they went "off track". For nude scenes the actors wore maebari, or adhesive strips, over their genitals in accordance with censorship practices. The film was edited in one day, a task made easy by Suzuki's method of shooting only the necessary footage. He had picked up the habit during his years working as an assistant director for Shochiku when film stock remained sparse after the war. Post-production was completed on June 14, 1967, the day before the film was released.

== Themes and style ==
Like many of its yakuza film contemporaries, Branded to Kill shows the influence of the James Bond films and film noir, though the film's conventional genre basis was combined with satire, kabuki stylistics and a pop art aesthetic. It was further set apart from its peers, and Seijun Suzuki's previous films, through its gothic sensibilities, unusual atonal score and what artist and academic Philip Brophy called a "heightened otherness". The result has been alternately ascribed as a work of surrealism, absurdism, the avant garde and included in the Japanese New Wave movement, though not through any stated intention of its director. Suzuki employed a wide variety of techniques and claimed his singular focus was to make the film as entertaining as possible.

Genre conventions are satirized and mocked throughout the film. In American noirs, heroes, or anti-heroes, typically strive to be the best in their field. Here the process was formalized into a rankings system obsessed over by its players. The femme fatale—a noir staple—Misako, does not simply entice the protagonist and bring the threat of death but obsesses him and is obsessed with all things death herself. She tries to kill him, wants to kill herself and surrounds herself with dead things. Hanada's libido is as present as that of the protagonists of similar films of the period, such as James Bond, though perversely exaggerated. Reviewer Rumsey Taylor likened Hanada's boiled rice sniffing fetish to Bond's "shaken, not stirred" martini order. The film also deviates from the opening killer-for-hire scenario to touch on such varied subgenres as psychosexual romance, American Gothic thriller and Odd Couple slapstick.

After discovering he cannot bring himself to kill Misako, a dazed Hanada wanders the streets. Animated starlings, rain and butterflies mask the screen, accompanied by corresponding sound effects.

The film industry is a subject of satire as well. For example, Japanese censorship often involved masking prohibited sections of the screen. Here Suzuki preemptively masked his own compositions but animated them and incorporated them into the film's design. In the story, after Hanada finds he is unable to kill Misako he wanders the streets in a state of confusion. The screen is obscured by animated images with accompanying sounds associated to her. The effects contributed to the eclectic visual and sound design while signifying his obsessive love. Author Stephen Teo proposed that the antagonistic relationship between Hanada and Number One may have been analogous of Suzuki's relationship with studio president Kyūsaku Hori. He compared Hanada's antagonizers to those who had been pressuring Suzuki to rein in his style over the previous two years. Teo cited Number One's sleeping with his eyes open and urinating where he sits, which the character explains as techniques one must master to become a "top professional."

The film was shot in black and white Nikkatsuscope (synonymous with CinemaScope at a 2.35:1 aspect ratio). Due to the wide frame, moving a character forward did not produce the dynamic effect Suzuki desired. Instead, he relied on spotlighting and chiaroscuro imagery to create excitement and suspense. Conventional framing and film grammar were disregarded in favour of spontaneous inspiration. In editing, Suzuki frequently abandoned continuity, favouring abstract jumps in time and space as he found it made the film more interesting. Critic David Chute suggested that Suzuki's stylistics had intensified—in seeming congruence with the studio's demands that he conform:

You can see the director reusing specific effects and pointedly cranking them up a notch. In Our Blood Will Not Allow It, the two battling brothers had a heart-to-heart in a car that was enveloped, just for the hell of it, in gorgeous blue moiré patterns of drenching rain. This "lost at sea" effect is revived in Branded to Kill but there's no sound at all in this version of the scene, except for the gangsters' hushed voices, echoless, plotting some fresh betrayal in a movie-movie isolation chamber.

== Reception ==
Branded to Kill was released to Japanese theatres on June 15, 1967, on a double bill with Shōgorō Nishimura's Burning Nature. The films were financially unsuccessful and the former fared likewise among critics. Kinema Junpo magazine reported that the films "resulted in less than 2,000 viewers at Asakusa and Shinjuku and about 500 at Yurakucho on the second day." Both Shishido and Yamatoya later recounted having seen Branded to Kill in practically empty theatres, the latter on its opening night. Iijima Kōichi, a critic for the film journal Eiga Geijutsu, wrote that "the woman buys a mink coat and thinks only about having sex. The man wants to kill and feels nostalgic about the smell of boiling rice. We cannot help being confused. We do not go to theaters to be puzzled." Nikkatsu had been criticized for catering to rebellious youth audiences, a specialty of Suzuki, whose films had grown increasingly anarchic through the 1960s. This had earned him a large following but it had also drawn the ire of studio head Kyūsaku Hori. On April 25, 1968, Suzuki received a telephone call from a company secretary informing him that he would not be receiving his salary that month. Two of Suzuki's friends met with Hori the next day and were told, "Suzuki's films were incomprehensible, that they did not make any money and that Suzuki might as well give up his career as a director as he would not be making films for any other companies."

"Suzuki makes incomprehensible films.
Suzuki does not follow the company's orders.
Suzuki's films are unprofitable and it costs 60 million yen to make one.
Suzuki can no longer make films anywhere. He should quit.
Suzuki should open a noodle shop or something instead."

— Kyūsaku Hori, Nikkatsu president

A student film society run by Kazuko Kawakita, the Cineclub Study Group, was planning to include Branded to Kill in a retrospective honouring Suzuki's works but Hori refused them and withdrew all of his films from circulation. With support from the Cineclub, similar student groups, fellow filmmakers and the general public—which included the picketing of the company's Hibiya offices and the formation of the Seijun Suzuki Joint Struggle Committee—Suzuki sued Nikkatsu for wrongful dismissal. During the three-and-a-half-year trial the circumstances under which the film was made and Suzuki was fired came to light. He had been made into a scapegoat for the company's dire financial straits and was meant to serve as an example on the outset of an attempted company-wide restructuring. A settlement was reached on December 24, 1971, in the amount of one million yen, a fraction of his original claim, as well as a public apology from Hori. In a separate agreement Branded to Kill and his previous film, Fighting Elegy, were donated to the Tokyo National Museum of Modern Art's Film Centre. The events turned Suzuki into a legend and shook the film world. Branded to Kill, along with other of his films, played to "packed audiences who wildly applauded" at all-night revivals in and around Tokyo. However, Suzuki was blacklisted by the major studios and did not make another feature film until A Tale of Sorrow and Sadness (1977) ten years after Branded to Kill. In the meantime, he subsisted on commercial and television work and writing books of essays.

Branded to Kill first reached international audiences in the 1980s, featuring in various film festivals and retrospectives dedicated wholly or partially to Suzuki, which was followed by home video releases in the late 1990s. It garnered a reputation as one of his most unconventional, revered Nikkatsu films and an international cult classic. On the review aggregator website Rotten Tomatoes, 100% of 25 critics' reviews are positive, with an average rating of 8.4/10. It has been declared a masterpiece by the likes of film critic Chuck Stephens, writer and musician Chris D., composer John Zorn and film director Quentin Tarantino. Writer and critic Tony Rayns noted, "Suzuki mocks everything from the clichés of yakuza fiction to the conventions of Japanese censorship in this extraordinary thriller, which rivals Orson Welles' Lady from Shanghai in its harsh eroticism, not to mention its visual fireworks." Modified comparisons to the films of a "gonzo Sam Fuller", or Jean-Luc Godard, assuming one "factor[s] out Godard's politics and self-consciousness", are not uncommon. In a 1992 Rolling Stone magazine article, film director Jim Jarmusch affectionately recommended it as, "Probably the strangest and most perverse 'hit man' story in cinema." Jasper Sharp of the Midnight Eye wrote, "It is a bloody marvellous looking film and arguably the pinnacle of the director's strikingly eclectic style."

However, the workings of the plot remain elusive to most. Sharp digressed, "To be honest it isn't the most accessible of films and for those unfamiliar with Suzuki's unorthodox and seemingly disjointed style it will probably take a couple of viewings before the bare bones of the plot begin to emerge." As Zorn has put it, "plot and narrative devices take a back seat to mood, music, and the sensuality of visual images." Japanese film historian Donald Richie thus encapsulated the film, "An inventive and ultimately anarchic take on gangster thrillers. The script flounders midway and Suzuki tries on the bizarre for its own sake." David Chute conceded that in labeling the film incomprehensible, "If you consider the movie soberly, it's hard to deny the bosses had a point." On a conciliatory note, Rayns commented "Maybe the break with Nikkatsu was inevitable; it's hard to see how Suzuki could have gone further in the genre than this."

After another unrelated 10-year hiatus, Suzuki and Nikkatsu reunited for the Style to Kill retrospective, held in April, 2001, at Theatre Shinjuku in Tokyo. It featured 28 films by Suzuki, including Branded to Kill. Suzuki appeared at the gala opening with star Annu Mari. Joe Shishido appeared for a talk session at an all-night, four-film screening. An accompanying Branded to Kill visual directory was published. The following year, the Tanomi Company produced a limited edition 1/6 scale "Joe the Ace" action figure based on Shishido's character in the film, complete with a miniature rice cooker. In 2006, Nikkatsu celebrated the 50th anniversary of Suzuki's directorial debut by hosting the Seijun Suzuki 48 Film Challenge retrospective at the 19th Tokyo International Film Festival. It showcased all of his films. He and Mari were again in attendance.

== Legacy ==
As one of Seijun Suzuki's most influential films, Branded to Kill has been acknowledged as a source of inspiration by such internationally renowned directors as Hong Kong's John Woo, South Korea's Park Chan-wook and America's Jim Jarmusch and Quentin Tarantino. Jarmusch listed it as his favourite hitman film, alongside Le Samouraï (also 1967), and thanked Suzuki in the screen credits of his own hitman film Ghost Dog: The Way of the Samurai (1999). Most notably, Jarmusch mirrored a scene in which the protagonist kills a target by shooting up from a basement through a sink drain. He went so far as to screen the film for Suzuki when the two met in Tokyo. Critics have noted Branded to Kill's influence on the films of Wong Kar-wai, such as his hitman film Fallen Angels (1995), as well as Johnnie To's Fulltime Killer (2001). However, Branded to Kill was most influential in its native Japan. The film's premise, in which hitmen try to kill each other in competition for the Number One rank, is spoofed in films such as Takeshi Kitano's Getting Any? (1995) and Sabu's Postman Blues (1997), which features a character named Hitman Joe. Branded to Kill played a role in the development of the long-running Lupin III franchise. It also had a profound impact, through Suzuki's firing and the resulting student uprising, in the beginnings of the movement film, usually underground or anti-establishment films which focused on issues of import to audiences, as opposed to production line genre pictures.

=== Associated films ===
Prior to the release of Branded to Kill, Suzuki and the other members of Hachiro Guryu began developing a stand-alone sequel to the film, tentatively titled Branded to Kill Continued (続・殺しの烙印, Zoku koroshi no rakuin). The story would have concerned Noda (set to have been played by Shishido), an unranked member of the assassin's guild Hanada belongs to, being tasked by a woman named Ruiko with killing her husband, a formerly-ranked killer who has since disgraced the organization. Noda would have soon discovered that he and Ruiko's husband share similar killing methods, as both would leave their victims with eerie grins upon their deaths. According to Yamatoya, Branded to Kill Continued would have "crank[ed] up" the surrealist qualities of the original film, and given meaning to the Branded of the film's title (with the grins on Noda's victims acting as his "brand"); the film's climax would have taken place on an abandoned island and depicted a shootout against a computer. A full script for Branded to Kill Continued was never written due to the original film's initial failure.

In 1973, Nikkatsu released Trapped in Lust, which has been described as a "Roman Porno reimagining" of Branded to Kill, as both tell the story of a contract killer forced to lie low after botching an assignment. Directed by Yamatoya from a script by fellow Hachiro Guryu member Yōzō Tanaka, the film was produced independently of Nikkatsu (in contrast to other Roman Porno films) by Genjiro Arato, who also played the lead role of Hoshi and would later produce the three films comprising Suzuki's Taishō Roman Trilogy, Zigeunerweisen (1980), Kagero-za (1981) and Yumeji (1991). Sharp has described Trapped in Lust as "a brilliant testament to the fact that, rather than mere cheap exploitation, the adult film genre was regarded as liberating, daring and anti-authoritarian, and that interesting and intelligent things could be realised with it". He also notes its reflection of the gumi system of the Japanese film industry (whereby a single director frequently works with the same pool of collaborators), as the film was made by Suzuki's recurring colleagues and thus bears elements of Suzuki's style despite his lack of involvement.

Thirty-four years after the original release of Branded to Kill, Suzuki directed Pistol Opera (2001), a loose sequel co-produced by Shochiku and filmed at Nikkatsu. The character Goro Hanada returns as a mentor figure to the new Number Three, played by Makiko Esumi. However, Joe Shishido was replaced by Mikijiro Hira in the role of Hanada. Suzuki has said that the original intention was for Shishido to play the character again but that the film's producer, Satoru Ogura, wanted Hira for the role. Reviews were of a favourable nature on par with its predecessor. Jonathan Rosenbaum supposed, "Can I call a film a masterpiece without being sure that I understand it? I think so ..." Although some, such as Elvis Mitchell for The Village Voice, felt its zeal fell slightly short of the original.

== Home video ==
Branded to Kill was initially made available in Japan by Nikkatsu in VHS format, first on February 10, 1987, then a second version on June 10, 1994. Both versions were censored for nudity with a black bar obscuring half of the frame during the relevant scenes. The first uncensored release since the film's theatrical debut was an October 26, 2001, DVD from Nikkatsu. It included an interview with Seijun Suzuki, two with Joe Shishido, an Annu Mari photo gallery and the original film trailers for it and several other Suzuki films. The release was one of three linked to the Style to Kill theatrical retrospective. In conjunction with the 50th anniversary of Suzuki's directorial debut, the film was included in the first of two six-film DVD box sets which was released October 1, 2006. All six titles included audio commentary tracks featuring Suzuki with various collaborators, those being Annu Mari and assistant director Masami Kuzū for Branded to Kill.

The first North American copy surfaced in the early 1990s at Kim's Video in New York in a video series titled Dark of the Sun devoted to obscure Asian cinema, assembled by John Zorn, albeit without English subtitles. The Criterion Collection released the film in the United States and Canada on laserdisc in 1998, followed by a DVD on February 23, 1999, both containing a 15-minute interview with Suzuki, poster gallery of Shishido films and liner notes by Zorn. Home Vision Cinema released a VHS version on June 16, 2000. Both companies conjunctively released Tokyo Drifter in all three formats in addition to a VHS collection packaging the two films together. In the United Kingdom, Second Sight Films released a DVD on February 25, 2002, and a VHS on March 11, 2002. Yume Pictures released a new DVD on February 26, 2007, as a part of their Suzuki collection, featuring a 36-minute interview with the director, trailers and liner notes by Tony Rayns. Madman Entertainment's Eastern Eye label released the film on DVD in Australia and New Zealand on May 2, 2007. It also contained the original trailer, a photo gallery and liner notes.

Criterion released Branded to Kill on Blu-ray on December 13, 2011; this release includes a 1997 interview with Suzuki and interviews conducted specifically for the Blu-ray featuring Suzuki, Kuzū and Shishido. Arrow Video released the film in the UK in a Blu-ray/DVD set on August 18, 2014; it includes an interview with Suzuki, an interview with Shishido conducted by writer Koshi Ueno, and Trapped in Lust.

== Soundtrack ==
Branded to Kill

Soundtrack album by Naozumi Yamamoto
- Released: February 23, 2007
- Genres: Soundtrack, jazz
- Label: Think

Forty years after the film's original release, on February 23, 2007, the Japanese record label Think issued the soundtrack on Compact Disc through its Cine Jazz series, which focused on 1960s Nikkatsu action films. The music was culled from Naozumi Yamamoto's score. Atsushi Yamatoya wrote the lyrics for the "Killing Blues" themes. Listings 27 through 29 are bonus karaoke tracks.

=== Track listing ===
No.	Translation	Japanese title	Romanization
1.	"Killing Blues (theme song)"	殺しのブルース （主題歌）	Koroshi no burūsu (shudaika)
2.	"Scotch and Hardboiled Rice pt1"	スコッチとハードボイルド米pt1	Sukocchi to hādoboirudo kome pāto wan
3.	"Scotch and Hardboiled Rice pt2"	スコッチとハードボイルド米pt2	Sukocchi to hādoboirudo kome pāto tsū
4.	"A Corpse in the Backseat"	死体バックシート	Shitai bakkushīto
5.	"The Hanada Bop"	ハナダ・バップ	Hanada bappu
6.	"Flame On pt1"	フレーム・オンpt1	Fureimu on pāto wan
7.	"Flame On pt2"	フレーム・オンpt2	Fureimu on pāto tsū
8.	"Manhater pt1"	男嫌いpt1	Otokogirai pāto wan
9.	"Manhater pt2"	男嫌いpt2	Otokogirai pāto tsū
10.	"Washing the Rice"	米を研げ	Kome o toge
11.	"The Devil's Job"	悪魔の仕事	Akuma no shigoto
12.	"Beastly Lovers"	野獣同士 （けだものどうし）	Kedamono dōshi
13.	"The Butterfly's Stinger pt1"	蝶の毒針pt1	Chō no dokushin pāto wan
14.	"The Butterfly's Stinger pt2"	蝶の毒針pt2	Chō no dokushin pāto tsū
15.	"Hanada's Barb pt1"	ハナダの針pt1	Hanada no hari pāto wan
16.	"Hanada's Barb pt2"	ハナダの針pt2	Hanada no hari pāto tsū
17.	"The Goodbye Look"	サヨナラの外観	Sayonara no gaikan
18.	"Napoleon Brandy"	ナポレオンのブランデー	Naporeon no burandē
19.	"Killing Blues (humming vers.)"	殺しのブルース （humming vers.）	Koroshi no burūsu (hamingu bājon)
20.	"Breakwater Shootout"	防波堤の撃合い	Bōhatei no uchiai
21.	"Killer's Bossa Nova"	殺し屋のボサノバ	Koroshiya no bosa noba
22.	"Something's Up"	何かが起る	Nanika ga koru
23.	"Beasts Are as Beasts"	獣は獣のように	Kedamono wa kedamono no yō ni
24.	"Number One's Cry"	ナンバーワンの叫び	Nanbā Wan no sakebi
25.	"The Tape Recorder Has the Track of Destiny"	テープレコーダーは運命の轍	Teipu rekōdā wa unmei no wadachi
26.	"Killing Blues (ending theme)" (Atsushi Yamatoya)	殺しのブルース （エンディングテーマ） （大和屋竺）	Koroshi no burūsu (endingu tēma) (Yamatoya Atsushi)
27.	"Title (karaoke vers.)"	タイトル （カラオケ vers.）	Taitoru (karaoke bājon)
28.	"Ending (karaoke vers.)"	エンディング （カラオケ vers.）	Endingu (karaoke bājon)
29.	"Title (dialogue-free vers.)"	タイトル （セリフなし vers.）	Taitoru (serifu nashi bājon)
