= 13th Yokohama Film Festival =

1992 film festival in Yokohama, Japan

- Location: Kannai Hall, Yokohama, Kanagawa, Japan
- Founded: 1980
- Festival date: 8 March 1992

The 13th Yokohama Film Festival (第13回ヨコハマ映画祭) was held on 8 March 1992 in Kannai Hall, Yokohama, Kanagawa, Japan.

== Awards ==
- Best Film: A Scene at the Sea
- Best New Actor: Sabu – World Apartment Horror
- Best Actor: Hidekazu Akai – Ōte
- Best Actress: Jun Fubuki – Nowhere Man
- Best New Actress:
  - Hiroko Oshima – A Scene at the Sea
  - Hikari Ishida – Chizuko's Younger Sister, Waiting for the Flood, My Soul Is Slashed
- Best Supporting Actor: Koji Matoba – Summer of the Lion Kings, No Worries on the Recruit Front
- Best Supporting Actress:
  - Emi Wakui – My Sons, No Worries on the Recruit Front
  - Reona Hirota – Ōte, Yumeji
- Best Director: Takeshi Kitano – A Scene at the Sea
- Best New Director: Naoto Takenaka – Nowhere Man
- Best Film Score: Joe Hisaishi – A Scene at the Sea, Chizuko's Younger Sister
- Best Screenplay: Toshiharu Marūchi – Nowhere Man
- Best Cinematography: Akihiro Itō – Ōte
- Best Art Direction: Noriyoshi Ikeya – Yumeji
- Special Jury Prize: Katsuhiro Ōtomo – World Apartment Horror – For succeeding in making animation film as well as feature film.

== Best 10 ==
1. A Scene at the Sea
2. Nowhere Man
3. Ōte
4. Rainbow Kids
5. Chizuko's Younger Sister
6. World Apartment Horror
7. Kaze, Slow Down
8. My Sons
9. Yumeji
10. Summer of the Lion Kings

runner-up: Nakibokuro
