= Fukumura =

Fukumura (written: 福村 or 譜久村) is a Japanese surname. Notable people with the surname include:

- Hiroshi Fukumura (福村 博, born 1949), Japanese jazz trombonist
- Mizuki Fukumura (譜久村 聖, born 1996), Japanese singer and actress
- Takayuki Fukumura (福村 貴幸, born 1991), Japanese footballer
- Yoshikazu Fukumura (福村 芳一, born 1946), Japanese conductor
