= Genjirō =

- Gender: Male

Origin
- Origin: Japanese
- Meaning: Different meanings depending on the kanji used

Genjirō, Genjiro or Genjirou (written: 源次郎 or 原二郎) is a masculine Japanese given name. Notable people with the name include:

- Genjiro Arato (荒戸 源次郎; 1946–2016), Japanese film producer, actor and director
- Genjirō Kaneko (金子 原二郎; born 1944), Japanese politician and governor of Nagasaki Prefecture
