= Koji Matoba =

Japanese actor and tarento (born 1969)

- 的場 浩司
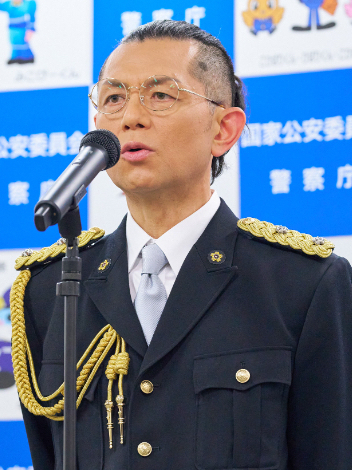
- Born: 28 March 1969 (age 57); Ageo, Saitama, Japan
- Occupations: Actor; tarento
- Years active: 1987–present
- Website: Affiliated office

Koji Matoba (的場 浩司, Matoba Kōji; born 28 March 1969, in Ageo, Saitama) is a Japanese actor and tarento.

== Filmography ==
=== TV dramas ===
Year	Title	Role	Notes	Ref.
1992	Nobunaga: King of Zipangu	Ikeda Tsuneoki	Taiga drama	
1997	Mōri Motonari	Noda Jiro	Taiga drama	
2002	Toshiie and Matsu	Murai Nagayori	Taiga drama	
2007	Kippari!	Yohei Kimitsuka		
2008	Atsuhime	Arima Shinshihi	Taiga drama	
2009	Clouds Over the Hill	Gaishi Nagaoka		
2014	Gunshi Kanbei	Yoshihiro Muneyuki	Taiga drama	
2016	Nobunaga Moyu	Yoshitsune	Television film	
2024	Wing-Man	Seidō Hirono		

=== Films ===
Year	Title	Role	Notes	Ref.
1988	Be-Bop High School: Kōkō Yotarō Kanketsu-hen	Sumitomo Kawabata		
1991	Shishiō-tachi no Natsu	Susumu Furuta	Lead role	
1991	No Worries on the Recruit Front	Norimichi Tachikawa		
2022	Everything Will Be Owlright!	Urashima		

=== Stage ===
Year	Title	Role	Ref.
2016	Yukimaroge	Ogo	

== Awards and nominations ==
Year	Award	Category	Work(s)	Result	Ref.
1992	13th Yokohama Film Festival	Best Supporting Actor	Shishiōtachi no Natsu and No Worries on the Recruit Front	Won	
