= Hyakken Uchida =

Japanese writer

- 内田 百間
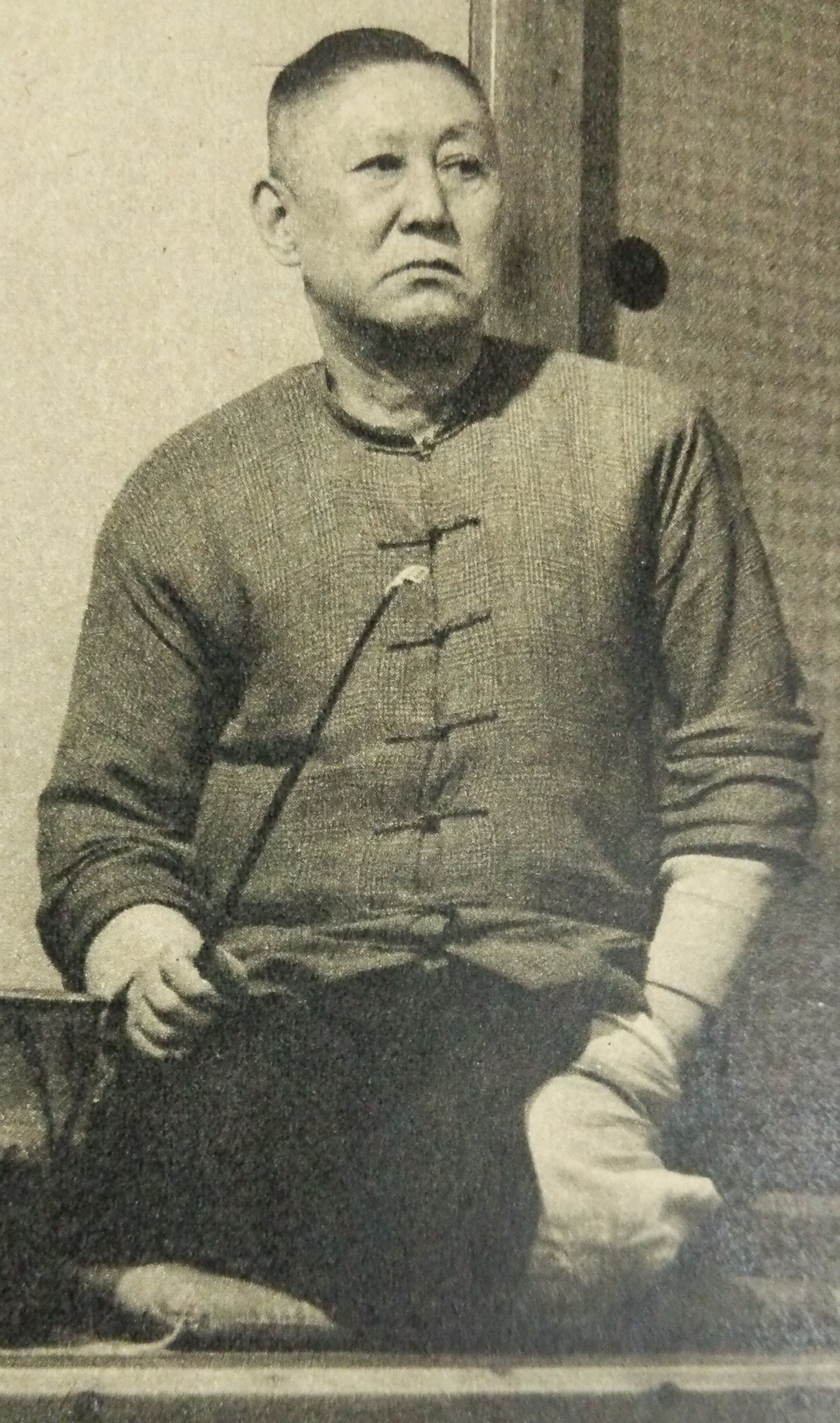
- Born: Eizō Uchida (內田 榮造); May 29, 1889; Okayama, Okayama, Japan
- Died: April 20, 1971 (aged 81); Tokyo, Japan
- Occupations: Writer and academic

Hyakken Uchida (内田 百間, Uchida Hyakken; May 29, 1889 – April 20, 1971) was a Japanese author and academic.

== Biography ==
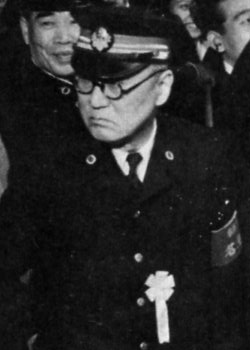
A portrait showing Hyakken Uchida

Uchida was born in Okayama to a family of sake brewers whose business later went bankrupt. His real name is Eizo Uchida (内田 榮造 Uchida Eizō). He became a pupil of Natsume Sōseki in 1911. He graduated from Tokyo University (Tokyo Imperial University) in 1914. He became professor of German at Imperial Japanese Army Academy in 1916. He later taught at Hosei University (Tokyo). He is the main subject of Akira Kurosawa's last film, Madadayo (まあだだよ). His novel, Disk of Sarasate (サラサーテの盤, Sarasāte no ban) is the inspiration for the film, Zigeunerweisen. He is the author of more than fifteen volumes of writings including I am a Cat: The Fake Version (贋作吾輩は猫である, Gansaku wagahai ha neko de aru), and Gates Close at Dusk (日没閉門, Nichibotsu heimon). In Japan he is well known as a passionate railfan and he made some works on railway travel. Though a great literary figure in Japan, he currently only has one book translated into English: Realm of the Dead (冥途 Meido). That volume also includes the collection Triumphal Entry into Ryojun (Ryojun Nyujōshiki (旅順入城式)). "Small Round Things", a translated excerpt from another collection, Jottings from the Goblins' Garden (Hyakkien Zuihitsu (百鬼園随筆)), appeared in the JAL inflight magazine Skyward in January 2006. He had two sons and three daughters.

== Bibliography ==
=== Novels ===
- Meido (冥途) (Realm of the Dead) (1922)
- Ryojun Nyujōshiki (旅順入城式) (1934)
- Journal de Tokyo (1938) cité dans "1Q84" de H.Murakami, livre 3, chapitre 3, note 1.
- Tokyo Nikki (東京日記) (The first appearance of the Tokyo Nikki in Oka no Hashi (丘の橋).) (1939)
- Nanzanju (南山壽) (The first appearance of the Nanzanju in Kiku no Ame (菊の雨).) (1939)
- Yanagi Kenkō no Shōkan (柳撿校の小閑) (The first appearance of the Yanagi Kenkō no Shōkan in Fune no Yume (船の夢).) (1941)
- Gansaku Wagahai wa Neko de Aru (贋作吾輩は猫である) (1950)
- Sarasāte no ban (サラサーテの盤) (The first appearance of the Sarasāte no ban in Jissetsu Sōheiki (實説艸平記).) (1951)
- Ahō Ressha (阿房列車) (1952–1956)

=== Essays ===
- Hyakkien Zuihitsu (百鬼園隨筆) (1933)
- Manuke no Jitsuzai ni Kansuru Bunken (間抜けの實在に關する文獻) (1933)
- Zoku Hyakkien Zuihitsu (續百鬼園隨筆) (1934)
- Daihinchō (大貧帳) (1941)
- Gochisōchō (御馳走帖) (1946)
- Jissetsu Sōheiki (實説艸平記) (1951)
- Nora ya (ノラや) (1957)
- Nichibotsu Heimon (日沒閉門) (1971)

=== Children's literature ===
- Ō-sama no Senaka (王樣の背中) (1934)

=== Diary ===
- Hyakkien Nikkichō (百鬼園日記帖) (1935)
- Hyakkien Nikkichō (續百鬼園日記帖) (1937)
- Tokyo Shōjin (東京焼盡) (1955)

=== Haiku ===
- Hyakkien Haikuchō (百鬼園俳句帖) (1934)
- Hyakkien Haiku (百鬼園俳句) (1943)

=== Film ===
- Roppa no Hōjiro Sensei (ロッパの頬白先生), Toho, 1939), starring Roppa Furukawa.
- Zigeunerweisen (ツィゴイネルワイゼン) (Toho, 1980), directed by Seijun Suzuki, starring Yoshio Harada, original novel Sarasāte no ban.
- Madadayo (まあだだよ) (Daiei, 1993), directed by Akira Kurosawa, starring Tatsuo Matsumura.

== See also ==
- Madadayo
