= Annu Mari =

Japanese actress (born 1948)

- Born: Vasanthidevi Sheth (ワサンティデヴィ・シェス); 20 May 1948 (age 78); Kobe, Hyogo, Japan
- Occupation: Actress
- Spouse: Yoshikazu Fukumura

Annu Mari (真理 アンヌ, Mari Annu; born 20 May 1948) is a Japanese actress best known in the West for her role as the femme fatale in the noir film Branded to Kill (1967).

Annu Mari was born Vasanthidevi Sheth in Kobe, to a Japanese mother and an Indian father. Her sisters are model Prabha Sheth and actress Yuka Kumari. She is married to conductor Yoshikazu Fukumura.

== Filmography ==
Year	Title	Role	Notes
1964	Jidôsha dorobô	Hatsuko	
1967	Kokusai himitsu keisatsu: Zettai zetsumei	Ayako	
1967	Ultraman	Pati	Episode: "Hateshinaki gyakushû"
1967	Branded to Kill (殺しの烙印)	Misako Nakajô	
1967	Shichinin no yajû		
1967	Kangoku e no shotai		
1967	Shichinin no yajû: chi no sengen		
1968	The spiders no dai-shingeki	Michiko Yashiro	
1968	Ultraseven		Episode: "Jouhatsu toshi"
1968	Nippon gerira jidai	Julie	
1968	Yoru no tehaishi		
1968	Dorifutazu desu yo! Bôken bôken mata bôken		
1968	Shinobi no manji	Aya	
1968	Konto gojugo-go: Seiki no daijukuten	Mako Komori	
1969	Zankoku onna rinchi		
1970	Cruel Female Love Suicide (残酷おんな情死)	Mari	
1970	Jack no irezumi		
1971	Kamen Rider	Female Executive Maya	2 episodes
1972	Furyo bancho ichimou dajin		
1972-1973	Wild 7 (ワイルド7)	Eiko （映子）	Series regular, 25 episodes
2002	Ashita ga aru sa: The Movie	Party Guest	
2003	Josee, the Tiger and the Fish (ジョゼと虎と魚たち)	Woman at Mahjong Bar	
2016	Hanadama: Gen'ei	Taeko Kimoto	
