= Shizue Tatsuta =

Japanese actress (1903–1962)

Tatsuta Shizue
- 龍田 静枝
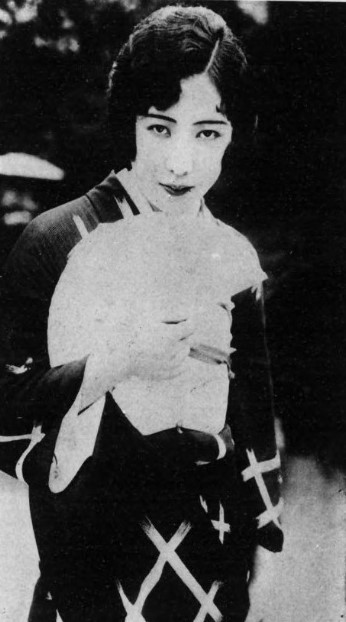
- Shizue Tatsuta in 1928
- Born: Shizue Shiono; November 3, 1903; Yamagata Prefecture, Japan
- Died: January 21, 1962 (aged 58); Setagaya, Tokyo
- Occupation: Actor
- Years active: 1924–1935
- Employer: Shochiku Studio
- Known for: Silent films

Shizue Tatsuta (Japanese: 龍田 静枝) (3 November 1903 - 21 January 1962) was the stage name of Shizue Shiono, a Japanese actress who starred in silent movies. Born in Yamagata Prefecture, she briefly attended Japan Women's University but did not graduate. Moving to Kyoto and joining the Shochiku Studio in 1924, she subsequently starred in over seventy silent films, primarily in the role of modern girl. Her last film, Educating Father (おやぢ教育) was released in 1935. After retiring from acting, she opened a bar in Tokyo, the city in which she ultimately died aged 58.

== Biography ==
Shizue Shiono was born in the Yamagata Prefecture of Japan on 3 November 1903, although she later claimed to have been born in 1906. After attending the local high school, she moved to Tokyo to study at Japan Women's University, but left before graduating with the ambition to become a photographer. In May 1924, she moved to Kyoto and auditioned for the Shochiku Studio, appearing in her first silent film, titled Kudō no hibiki (久遠の響) or Throat Sound, the same year. She adopted the stage name of Shizue Tatsuta, under which she subsequently appeared in over seventy films, her last, titled Oyaji kyōiku (おやぢ教育) or Educating Father, being released in 1935. During her time, she worked with directors like Yasujirō Shimazu and Yasujirō Ozu. She then retired and moved to Ginza in Tokyo, opening a bar. She married Aikichi Ikeda, a dealer in luxury furniture, in 1938, with whom she had a child. She died on 21 January 1962 at her home in Setagaya, Tokyo.

As an actress, Shizue frequently played the role of the modern girl. In the nationalistic atmosphere of the time, this character often had the role of antagonist, being subject to inherent flaws that led to her downfall in comparison to the more traditional Japanese values embodied by the protagonist.

== Filmography ==
Shizue's film career lasted between 1924 and 1935 and included appearances in the following films:

- 1924 Throat Sound (久遠の響)
- 1924 Pirate Island (海賊島)
- 1924 Deciduous Song (落葉の唄)
- 1925 Kouei is Hell (虚栄は地獄)
- 1926 Dawn of Tears (涙の黎明)
- 1927 Tears (涙)
- 1927 New Pearl (新珠)
- 1927 The Hero of the Sea (海の勇者)
- 1927 The Man Who Picked up Love (恋を拾った男)
- 1928 Weak People (弱き人々)
- 1928 Spring Hiraku (春ひらく)
- 1929 A New Kind of Woman (新女性感)
- 1930 An Introduction to Marriage (結婚学入門)
- 1930 I Love Women (女給 愛し)
- 1930 Sisters (姉妹篇)
- 1930 New edition, I am Sin Sakubei (新編, 己が罪作兵衛)
- 1930 Young Lady (お嬢さん)
- 1933 The Bride Talks (花嫁の寝言)
- 1935 Educating Father (おやぢ教育)
