= Zigeunerweisen (film) =

- Film poster
- Directed by: Seijun Suzuki
- Written by: Yōzō Tanaka; Hyakken Uchida (novel)
- Produced by: Genjiro Arato
- Starring: Yoshio Harada; Naoko Otani; Toshiya Fujita
- Cinematography: Kazue Nagatsuka
- Edited by: Nobutake Kamiya
- Music by: Kaname Kawachi
- Distributed by: Cinema Placet
- Release date: April 1, 1980
- Running time: 145 minutes
- Country: Japan
- Language: Japanese

Zigeunerweisen (Japanese: ツィゴイネルワイゼン, Hepburn: Tsigoineruwaizen; from the German "Gypsy Airs") is a 1980 independent Japanese film directed by Seijun Suzuki and based on Hyakken Uchida's novel, Disk of Sarasate. It takes its title from a gramophone recording of Pablo de Sarasate's violin composition, Zigeunerweisen, which features prominently in the story. The film makes the first part of Suzuki's Taishō Roman Trilogy, followed by Kagero-za (1981) and Yumeji (1991), surrealistic psychological dramas and ghost stories linked by style, themes and the Taishō period (1912-1926) setting. All three were produced by Genjiro Arato.

When exhibitors declined to screen the film, Arato screened it himself in an inflatable, mobile tent to great success. It won Honourable Mention at the 31st Berlin International Film Festival, was nominated for nine Japanese Academy Awards and won four, including best director and best film, and was voted the number one Japanese film of the 1980s by Japanese critics.

== Plot ==
Vacationing in a small seaside village, Aochi, a professor of German language, runs into Nakasago, a former colleague turned nomad. Nakasago is being pursued by an angry mob for allegedly seducing and killing a fisherman's wife. The two catch up over dinner where they are entertained by and become smitten with the mourning geisha Koine. Six months later, Aochi visits Nakasago to find that he has settled down and is having a child with Sono, a woman who bears a remarkable resemblance to Koine. Nakasago plays him a recording of Zigeunerweisen and they discuss inaudible mumbling on the record. Nakasago suddenly takes to the road again with Koine, leaving Sono to birth their child alone. Both men enter affairs with the other's wife. Nakasago suggests to Aochi that whoever outlives the other should get the other's bones. Sono later dies of the flu and is replaced by Koine as a surrogate mother. Nakasago takes to the road yet again. Aochi learns of Nakasago's death in a landslide. Years later, Koine visits Aochi and requests the return of the Zigeunerweisen record but he is sure he never borrowed it. When his wife reveals the record, he rushes over to deliver it to Koine. Koine explains that her daughter, Toyoko, talks in her sleep about Nakasago. On his way home, Aochi encounters Toyoko, who demands his bones.

== Cast ==
- Yoshio Harada as Nakasago
- Naoko Otani as Koine/Sono
- Toshiya Fujita as Aochi
- Michiyo Okusu as Shuko, Aochi's wife
- Kisako Makishi as Taeko
- Kirin Kiki as Kimi
- Akaji Maro as Blind Man
- Sumie Sasaki as Maid in a hotel
- Isao Tamagawa as Doctor Amaki
- Hatsuo Yamaya as a Policeman

== Production ==
Director Seijun Suzuki was ostensibly terminated from his contract with Nikkatsu Studios in 1968 for making "movies that make no sense and no money" and subsequently blacklisted. In the proceeding years he met frequently with his crew at his home in developing ideas for new projects. This resulted in Zigeunerweisen and Kagero-za—the first two films in what would become Suzuki's Taishō Roman Trilogy. Suzuki felt that action films were falling out of favour and wanted to create a new type of film. Writer Yōzō Tanaka lived close by and visited Suzuki regularly where they infrequently discussed the film during games of Go. The story was based on Hyakken Uchida's novel, Disk of Sarasate. It was felt to be too short and was expanded from their conversations. For example, when Tanaka's uncle died during that time, he noticed that his cremated bones were pink. This was incorporated into the screenplay.

Suzuki's de facto blacklisting ended with the release of his critically and commercially unsuccessful 1977 film A Tale of Sorrow and Sadness. The money to finance Zigeunerweisen only became available in 1979 when Suzuki met then–theatre producer Genjiro Arato. Thus it became their first fully independently produced film. It was shot on location in Japan.

== Style and themes ==
Zigeunerweisen is a departure from director Suzuki Seijun's Nikkatsu films in many ways. It was shot entirely on location without access to studio resources; it runs 144 minutes, in contrast to the former's 90-minute maximum; and its intellectual characters and period setting and subject matter invited a more literary audience as opposed to the younger genre fans that formed Suzuki's cult following. On the other hand, freed of studio constraints, Suzuki was able to carry his style even further in the direction his genre work had taken and abandon traditional narrative entirely in favour of random occurrences and incongruous and misleading associations. He presents, comments on and challenges the conceptions of the Taishō era, specifically the wide introduction and assimilation of Western culture into Japan and its effect on the Japanese identity.

== Releases and reception ==
Producer Genjiro Arato was unable to procure exhibitors for Zigeunerweisen and exhibited the film himself with his company Cinema Placet in a specially-built, inflatable, mobile tent. The film was initially screened beside the Tokyo Dome on April 1, 1980. The film was an immediate success and was quickly picked up for a wide release. In its 22-week run it sold 56 000 seats, where 10 000 was generally considered a success for an independent film. Critics named Zigeunerweisen the "must-see" film of 1980, it garnered four Japanese Academy Awards and reignited Suzuki's career. Little More Co. re-released the full Taishō Roman Trilogy theatrically on April 28, 2001, in the Deep Seijun retrospective. In conjunction they released the trilogy on DVD (without English subtitles), marking its debut on home video.

The film was not distributed internationally but did appear in film festivals and retrospectives. It was screened in competition at the 31st Berlin International Film Festival and appeared in the first British retrospective of Suzuki's films at the 1988 Edinburgh International Film Festival. In North American, Kino International released a DVD edition of the film on March 7, 2006. It features a 25-minute interview with Suzuki discussing the making of the Taishō Roman Trilogy, a biography and filmography of the same, the theatrical trailer and a gallery of promotional material and photographs. The DVD is also available in a box set encompassing the trilogy.

== Awards ==
Zigeunerweisen received nine nominations at the 1981 Japanese Academy Awards and won in four categories, Best Film, Suzuki won for Best Director, Takeo Kimura for Best Art Director and Michiyo Okusu for Best Supporting Actress. Also nominated were Naoko Otani for Best Actress, Toshiya Fujita for Best Supporting Actor, Yōzō Tanaka for Best Screenplay, Kazue Nagatsuka for Best Cinematography and Mitsuo Onishi for Best Lighting.

At the Kinema Junpo Awards, it duplicated the same four wins plus a fifth Best Actress award for Naoko Otani. At the Yokohama Film Festival it won Best Film, Director and Cinematographer. Further prizes include the Blue Ribbon Awards (Best Director), Hochi Film Awards (Special Award) and the Mainichi Film Concurs (Best Screenplay and Best Cinematographer). The film was also voted the best Japanese film of the 1980s by Japanese film critics.

On the international front, the film won Honourable Mention at the 31st Berlin International Film Festival in 1981.
