= Isao Kuraishi =

Japanese actor

- 倉石 功
- Born: April 1, 1944 (age 81); Nagano, Nagano, Japan
- Occupation: Actor
- Years active: 1963–
- Agent: Office Miyamoto
- Height: 1.83 m (6 ft 0 in)

Isao Kuraishi (倉石 功, Kuraishi Isao; born April 1, 1944, in Nagano, Nagano, Japan) is a Japanese actor represented by Office Miyamoto. His eldest son is fashion designer Kazuki Kuraishi.

== Biography ==
After dropping out from Nihon University College of Art, Kuraishi won the Mr. Mediocre Grand Prix award. He later joined to Daiei Film. Kuraishi started making regular appearances in Tokyo Keibi Shirei The Guardsman as Taiin Sugii.

On 1974, he dated The Guardsman co-star Ken Utsui's daughter and later married in six months.

On recent years Kuraishi and his wife appeared on travel series in TV Tokyo.

== Filmography ==
=== Films ===
Year	Title	Role	Notes
1963	Kuro no Shikyuu		
1964	Shiawasenara te o Tatakou		
1965	The Guardsman	Sugii	
1967	Naomi	Masataro Kumagai	
1977	Circuit no Ōkami	Minoru Asuka	
1978	Tarao Ban'nai	Keiji Yamamoto	
1978	Never Give Up	Sakura	
1979	Kogane no Inu		
1979	G.I. Samurai	Masao Maruoka	

=== TV series ===
Year	Title	Role	Network	Notes
1965	Tokyo Keibi Shirei The Guardsman	Taiin Sugii	TBS	
1972	Secret Butai	Keiji Kano	TBS	
1972	Omatsuri Gin-ji Torimono-chō	Takichi	Fuji TV	Episode 3
1972	Nantatte 18 sai!		TBS	Episode 28
1973	Mama ha Rival		TBS	Episode 38
1974	Dokkoi Daisaku	Jiro Kashima	TV Asahi	Episode 51
1974	Hijō no License	Shuzo Kaga	TV Asahi	Episode 41
1975	Kamen Rider Stronger	Mamoru Misaki	MBS	Episode 13
1975	Tokubetsu Kidō Sōsa-tai	Keiji Tasaka	TV Asahi	
1976	Versailles no Torakku ane-chan	Shigeru Hayashi	TV Asahi	Episode 13
1976	Kakushi-me-tsuki Sanjō	Shume Fujio	MBS	Episode 22
1976	O Mimi-yaku Hi-chō	Genichiro Isomura	KTV	Episode 23
1977	Kaiketsu Zubat	Haruhiko Otsuki	TV Tokyo	Episode 16
1977	Shin Hissatsu Shiokinin	Nikichi	ABC	
1977	Kareinaru Deka	Kenzaki	Fuji TV	Episode 30
1978	Princess Comet		TBS	Episode 12
1978	Mito Kōmon		TBS	
1978	Edo Professional Hissatsu Shōbainin	Kisaburo	ABC	Episode 16
1978	Zenigata Heiji	Senkichi Mashirano	Fuji TV	Episode 648
1979	Kita no Yado Kara	Ryusuke	TBS	
1979	The Super Girl		TV Tokyo	Episode 11
1979	Abarenbō Shōgun	Matajuro Shinmen	TV Asahi	Episode 80
1979	Kakekomi Biru 7-gōshitsu	Kenji	Fuji TV	Episode 10
1980	Shishi no Jidai	Yamakawa Hiroshi	NHK	
1980	Seibu Keisatsu	Kenji Kitazawa	TV Asahi	Episode 18
1980	Taiyō ni Hoero!	Ruji Tachibana	NTV	Episode 424
1980	Doberman Deka		TV Asahi	Episode 19
1980	Mikeneko Homes no Tsuiseki	Izumida	TV Asahi	
1980	Ken-chan Chaco-chan	Gambari	TBS	
1981	Chotto ī Shimai		TBS	
1983	Tokugawa Ieyasu	Kuroda Nagamasa	NHK	
1984	School Wars: Hero	Kingo Matsumata	TBS	
1986	Katei tte?		TBS	
1991	Shōnan Pension-dōri		TBS	
1994	Itsunohika Sono Mune ni		TBS	
1995	Getsuyō Drama Special		TBS	
1999	Tengoku no Kiss		TV Asahi	
2003	Tokumei Kakarichō Hitoshi Tadano		TV Asahi	
2013	Hanchō: Keishichō Asaka Han Series 6	Shiraishi	TBS	Episode 3
2013	Yae no Sakura	Andō Nobumasa	NHK	
2013	Kasōken no On'na Sai 13 Series	Chojiro Imura	TV Asahi	Episode 5
2015	Zeimu Chōsakan Madogiwa Tarō no Jiken-bo 28	Katsumi Gondo	TBS	

=== Stage ===
Year	Title	Notes
	The Merchant of Venice	
	Annie Get Your Gun	
	Chūshingura	
	Seishun Dendekedekedeke	
2008	Applause	
2009	Hercule Poirot	
2010	The Mousetrap	
