= Akame 48 Waterfalls =

- DVD cover

Japanese name
- Kanji: 赤目四十八瀧心中未遂
- Directed by: Genjiro Arato
- Screenplay by: Toya Suzuki
- Based on: Akame 48 Waterfalls by Chokichi Kurumatani
- Produced by: Akitoshi Kawazu; Tomiyasu Ishikawa; Osamu Murayama; Hidehito Tachibana; Shinichiro Muraoka; Kaizo Hayashi; Toshihiro Fukuhara
- Starring: Shinobu Terajima; Michiyo Okusu
- Cinematography: Norimichi Kasamatsu
- Edited by: Yoshiyuki Okuhara
- Music by: Shūichi Chino
- Production companies: Eisei Gekijo; Tokyo Media Relations
- Release date: October 25, 2003 (Japan)
- Running time: 159 minutes
- Country: Japan
- Language: Japanese

Akame 48 Waterfalls (Japanese: 赤目四十八瀧心中未遂) is a 2003 Japanese film directed by Genjiro Arato. It is based on the novel of the same name by Chokichi Kurumatani that was serialized in Bungakukai from November 1996 to October 1998.

== Awards and nominations ==
46th Blue Ribbon Awards

- Won: Best Film
- Won: Best Actress - Shinobu Terajima
- Won: Best Supporting Actress - Michiyo Okusu

28th Hochi Film Award

- Won: Best Actress - Shinobu Terajima
