= Cruel Female Love Suicide =

- Directed by: Shōgorō Nishimura
- Written by: Gan Yamazaki
- Produced by: Eiichi Imato
- Starring: Annu Mari; Sanae Ohori
- Cinematography: Syohei Ando
- Edited by: Masanori Tsujii
- Music by: Riichiro Manabe
- Distributed by: Nikkatsu
- Release date: 18 April 1970
- Running time: 86 minutes
- Country: Japan
- Language: Japanese

Cruel Female Love Suicide (残酷おんな情死, Zankoku onna jōshi), also known as Midnight Virgin, is a 1970 Japanese film directed by Shōgorō Nishimura and starring Annu Mari and Sanae Ōhori. The major Japanese film studio Nikkatsu began to experiment with erotic-themed movies beginning in the late 1960s in an attempt to save the company from insolvency. Cruel Female Love Suicide continued this trend which eventually resulted in the inauguration of Nikkatsu's Roman Porno series of films in November 1971 with Apartment Wife: Affair In the Afternoon, also directed by Nishimura.

== Plot ==
Chie, newly arrived in Tokyo, saves her friend from school, Mari, from a suicide attempt. The two girls become close, eventually leading to a lesbian relationship. Their affair drifts into sadism and involvement with a bizarre sex cult, resulting in the deaths of the two lovers.

== Cast ==
- Annu Mari as Mari
- Sanae Ōhori (大堀早苗) as Chie
- Shinji Takano (高野真二) as Matsui
- Jirō Okazaki (岡崎二朗) as Eiji
- Haruo Tanaka as Aihara
- Kotaro Sugie (杉江広太郎) as Maeda

== Release ==
The film was released theatrically in Japan on April 18, 1970 by the Nikkatsu studio which also produced a VHS tape version in January 1990.

== See also ==
- List of lesbian, gay, bisexual or transgender-related films
