= Modern girl =

Westernized Japanese women during the Interwar period

Modern Girl
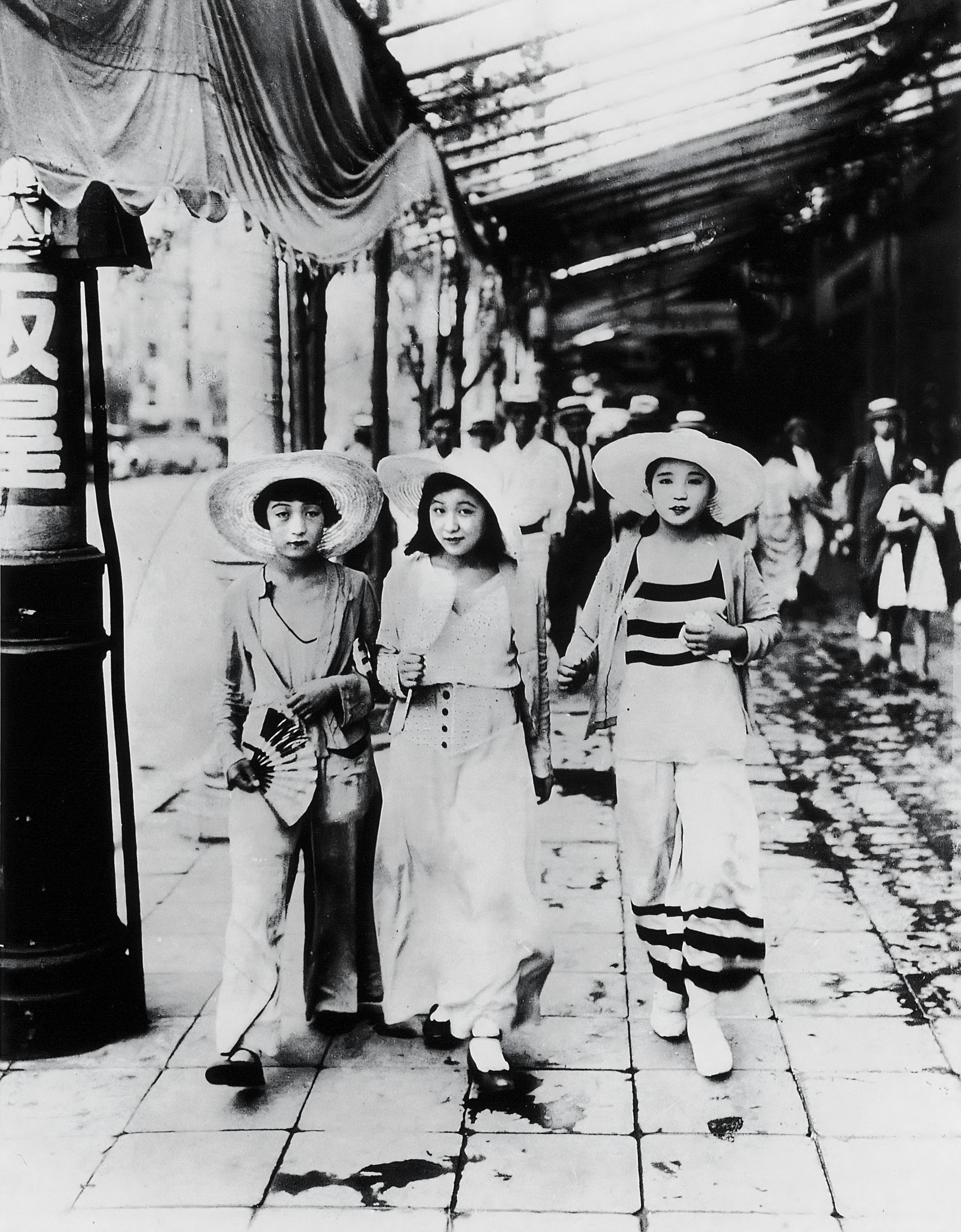
- Modern girls wearing "Beach Pajama" style clothing walking down Ginza in 1928
- Years active: Interwar
- Country: Japan
- Influences: Naomi

Modern Girls (モダンガール, modan gāru) (also shortened to Moga) were a subcategory of Japanese working women who adopted modern fashions and lifestyles in Japan following World War l. Modern Girls were contemporaries to the Western world's flappers, France's garçonnes, and China's modeng xiaojie (摩登小姐).

Exploiting the economic expansion induced in Japan by World War I, many young women who were previously constrained by ideologies of family life and the Japanese state could now work wage labor jobs in Tokyo, Osaka, and Kyoto. This independence, characterized by a movement out of the home and into the city, created opportunities for women to adopt alternative norms of dress; enabling them to embody the new, fashionable, playful, Modern Girl. The Modern Girl was sensual, "breezy," erotic, animated, and independent. While the dress of a Modern Girl was somewhat distinct, she was more often described via her gestures, her "way of being," with her clothing as an element to her archetype.

The woman's magazine was a novelty at this time, and the Modern Girl was a model consumer, someone more often found in advertisements for cosmetics and fashion than in real life. The all-female Takarazuka Revue, established in 1914, and the novel Naomi (1924) are examples of Modern Girl culture.

== Origins and etymology ==
=== Shōjo (girl) culture ===
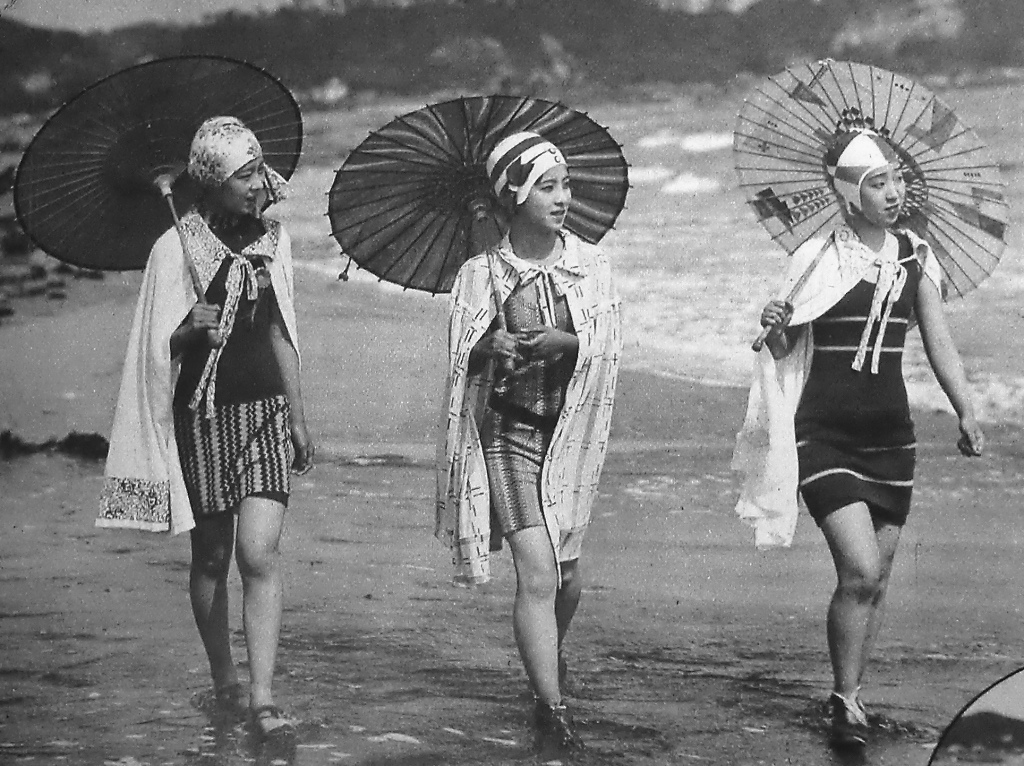
1929 advertisement for the Shirokiya department store featuring actresses walking on the beach at Kamakura

The origins of the Modern Girl can be traced to the emergence of shōjo (girl) culture during the late Meiji era (1868–1912) into the Taishō era (1912–26). Progressive modernisation, the development of Japan's industrial capacity following the Sino-Japanese wars, and the emergence of the "new middle class" resulted in different social and class relations — altering the notions of the "child" or "youth", and facilitating new styles and expressions of gender differentiation. Two areas where the changed perspective on gender differences were visible were schools and magazines. The Higher Girls' School Act, making at least one girls’ high school per prefecture mandatory, was implemented in 1899 and the subsequent percentage of girls who continued their education into secondary school rose from 1.5 percent in 1895 to 9.2 percent in 1910, 15.5 percent in 1930, and 22 percent in 1940. This coincided with the growth of publications that were directed exclusively at a young, female readership, which started in 1902 with Shōjokai (Girls’ Sphere, published by Kinkodo), Shōjo sekai (Girls’ World, published by Hakubunkan, 1906), Shōjo no tomo (Girls’ Friend, Jitsugyo no Nihonsha, 1908), and Shōjo gahō (Girls’ Pictorial, Tokyosha, 1912). Shōjo no tomo was positioned as the sister magazine of Jitsugyo no Nihonsha’s Nihon shonen (Japanese Boys). These shōjo (girl) magazines were often spin-offs of boys' magazines.

The "child” came to be defined as someone guided and educated through the modern education system past compulsory primary education. The emergence of a distinct period categorized as "youth" was then subdivided according to gender. Early representations of the shōjo were largely confined to the domestic sphere and the girls' high school system, both of which emphasized the ryosai kenbo (good wife, wise mother) ideal.

Suzuki Sadami argues that “‘the ‘Modern Girl’ emerged from the vortex created by the combination of the rise in interest in the principles of women’s liberation and socialism, with the energy and culture of the new city that was reconstructed in the wake of the Great Kanto Earthquake.”

=== Early usage ===
The term Modern Girl is generally attributed to first appearing in Japan in Kitazawa Chōgo's article entitled ‘‘The Emergence of the Modern Girl—A Letter to My Sister in Japan’’ (Modan gāru no hyōgen—Nihon no imōto ni okuru tegami), published in the April 1923 issue of Josei kaizō (Women’s Reform). Chōgo wrote about the Modern Girl in England in the August 1924 issue of Josei (Women), a popular women’s magazine. Kitazawa spent a number of years in England and attributed universal qualities to the English Modern Girl, which he believed would surface in a Japanese counterpart.

"If I were pressed to answer whether or not the modern girl exists in any great number in Japan, I would have to hesitate before replying. But if I answered with a flat ‘no,’ I would also feel hesitant. Suffice it to say that quite a few girls in Japan possess the potential for being modern. There is little doubt in my mind that if the modern girl has not already appeared in Japanese society, she soon will".

Jun'ichirō Tanizaki's 1924 novel Naomi was such a hit that it caused considerable outrage among elders in Japan. However, younger women embraced the story and celebrated the values displayed by several of the main characters. The character became a feature of many silent films produced in Japan at the time by directors like Yasujirō Ozu. Actresses such as Tatsuta Shizue became known for their depiction of Modern Girls in contrast to the more traditional values depicted by other characters in films.

The Modern Girl archetype was further bolstered by magazines such as The Housewife's Friend (主婦の友, Shufu no tomo), founded in 1917, and Woman (女性, Josei), founded in 1922; both magazines ran articles, fashion tips, and advice on the Modern Girl lifestyle, with Josei described as "the bible of the Modern Girl."

== Practices and depictions ==
Taniguchi Fumie's 1935 depiction of various moga as they prepare to go out into public.

A Modern Girl's appearance was at the intersection of multiple converging and diverging forces that were unique to Japan around and during the Interwar period. These forces included but were not limited to: evolving "western" models of femininity and a traditional "Japanese" one, aspirational depictions of professional, liberated working woman, and economically unburdened young women who were at liberty to "look," consume, and be commodified as living mannequins. Furthermore, these depictions were exceptional in that they were explicitly public. Meaning, they were not only at liberty to look, but also at liberty to be seen. In the words of Miriam Silverberg (2006),

"The Japanese woman was no longer secluded in the confines of the household but was out in the open, working and playing alongside men. This was her real transgression: she would not accept the division of labor that had placed her in the home."

Specifically, the dressing of a Modern Girl involved donning youfuku (Western-style clothing), which encompassed trousers, short dresses that emphasized the curvature of the butt and exposed the lower leg, makeup, western shoes, and short permed hair. However, it is difficult to clearly demarcate between behavior and appearance, as the Modern Girl's ideal behavior (such as browsing shopfronts in Ginza or walking "flirtatiously" through a train car) was so interlocked with her appearance.

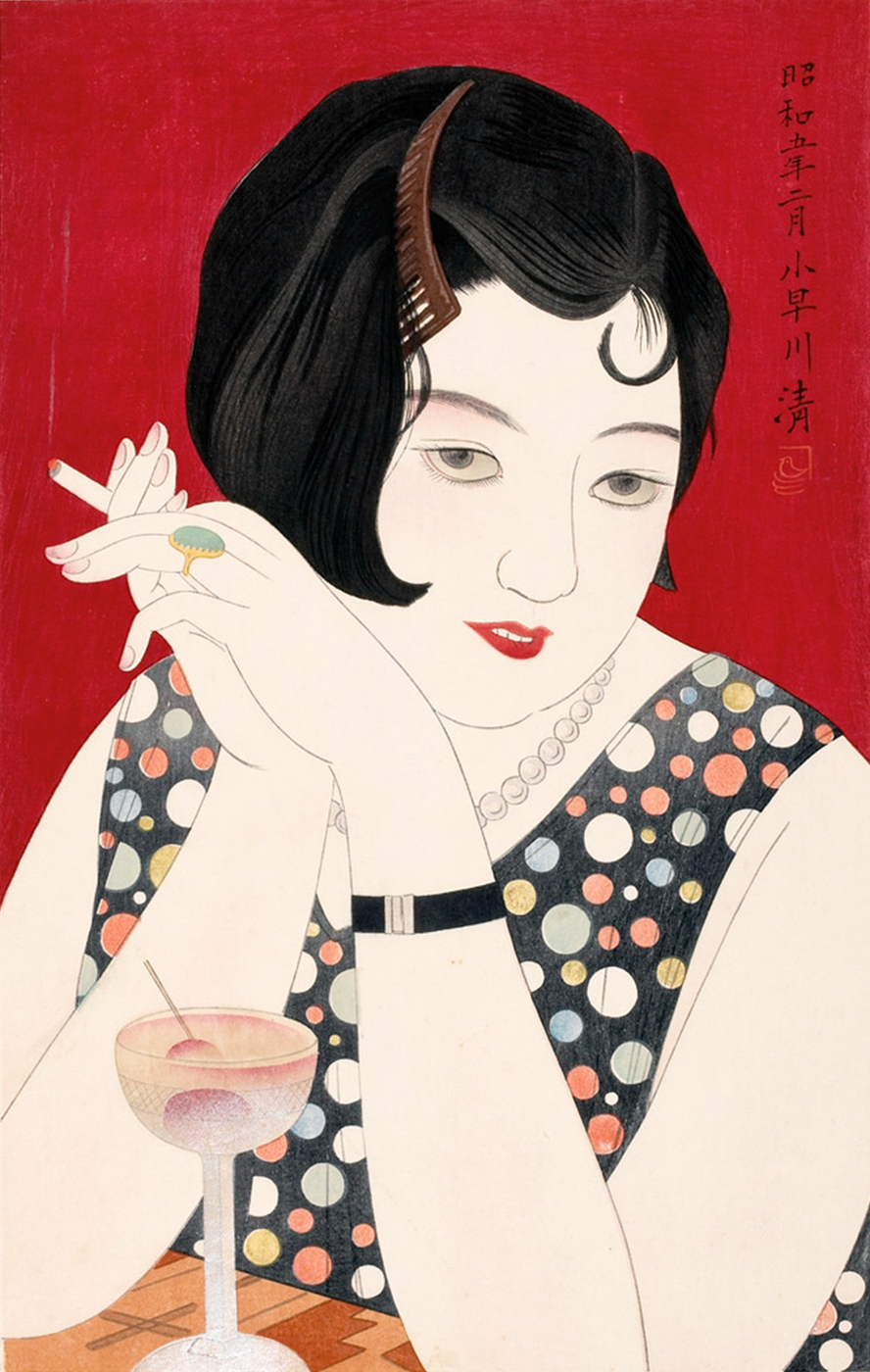
Tipsy by Kobayakawa Kiyoshi

The Modern Girl was a negotiation of modernity, and as such more traditional clothing, like the kimono, were often refashioned or used to emphasize the specific national essence of the Modern Girl aesthetic. Instances of this can be seen in the fashion magazine Fujin Gahō, where scenes of women in wholly "westernized" outfits were placed adjacent to women in traditional kimonos, with parasols positioned between their faces and the camera. This depiction would have suggested a "hybrid" lifestyle, where depending on proximity to the public, a Modern Girl would don different clothing. In contrast, other magazines such as Shufu no Tomo (The Housewife's Friend) depicted and framed the Modern Girl as a much less disruptive archetype, emphasizing neatness and passive femininity.

Modern Girls prioritized financial and emotional independence. They smoked, watched movies, and "appeared" in cafes. Many of them participated in casual sex. In a 1928 short story by Kataoka Teppei, a young typist dates three "modern boys" at the same time. She is described by Teppei as decadent, hedonistic, and superficial.

Various western movie stars, such as Mary Pickford, were explicitly emulated in the dress of some Modern Girls. Pickford is used as a symbol of modernism in Naomi.

== End of era ==
The Modern Girl was a symbol of Westernization, and a symbol of extravagance and self-centered choices. However, following military coups of the 1930s, Japanese nationalism, the Great Depression and the Second Sino-Japanese War, the popularity of Western fashion, ideals and entertainment declined sharply. The decline of the Modern Girl, previously driven by the use of disposable income on consumerism and shopping, was only exacerbated further by the severe rationing of World War II. Following World War II, the developments of post-war Japan prompted a return to the 19th century ideal of Good Wife, Wise Mother.

== See also ==
- New Woman
- Kogal
- Haikara-san ga Tōru, a popular 1970s manga and anime series by Waki Yamato in which the lead character, Hanamura Benio, is a "Modern Girl," or "haikara-san" ("Miss High-Collar")
