= Naomi (novel) =

Novel by Junichiro Tanizaki

- First edition
- Author: Jun'ichirō Tanizaki
- Original title: Chijin no Ai
- Translator: Anthony H. Chambers
- Cover artist: Kashō Takabatake (高畠華宵)
- Language: Japanese
- Publisher: Shinchōsha (Japanese); Knopf (English)
- Publication date: 1925
- Publication place: Japan
- English publication date: September 12, 1985
- Media type: Print (Paperback, Hardcover)
- Pages: 449 (Japanese); 237 (English)
- ISBN: 4-10-100501-X (Japanese); ISBN 0-394-53663-0 (English)

Naomi (痴人の愛, Chijin no Ai; lit. A Fool's Love) is a novel by Japanese author Jun'ichirō Tanizaki (1886–1965). Writing of the novel began in 1924, and from March to June, Osaka's Morning News (大阪朝日新聞, Osaka Asahi Shinbun) published the first several chapters of the serial. Four months later, the periodical Female (女性, Josei) started to publish the remaining chapters. The novel was first published in book form, by Kaizosha, in 1925.

Narrated in the first person by the protagonist, a salaryman named Jōji, the novel follows his attempt to groom a Eurasian-looking girl, the eponymous Naomi, to be a Westernized woman. Naomi is a significant work in its comic depiction of Japanese culture of the era and its fascination with the West. The clash between older and newer generations over the more progressive depictions of women, such as Naomi, has been viewed as a clash over Japan's transition into the modern period.

== Plot summary ==
Naomi's story is focused around a man's obsession for a modan garu or modern girl. The narrator, Jōji, is a well-educated Japanese man who is an electrical engineer in the city, and comes from a wealthy farming family. Jōji wishes to break away from his traditional Japanese culture, and becomes immersed in the new Westernized culture which was taking root in Japan. Jōji sees Naomi for the first time in a café and instantly falls for her exotic "Eurasian" looks, Western-sounding name, and sophisticated mannerisms. Like the story of the prepubescent Murasaki no Ue in The Tale of Genji, Jōji decides he will raise Naomi, a fifteen-year-old café hostess, to be his perfect woman: in this case, he will forge her into a glamorous Western-style girl like Mary Pickford, the famous Canadian actress of the silent film era, whom he thinks Naomi resembles.

Jōji moves Naomi into his home and begins his efforts to make her a perfect Western wife. She turns out to be a very willing pupil. He pays for her English-language lessons, and though she has little skill with grammar, she possesses beautiful pronunciation. He funds her Westernized activities, including her love of movies, dancing and magazines. During the early part of the novel Jōji makes no sexual advances on Naomi, preferring instead to groom her according to his desires and observe her from a distance. However, his plan to foster Western ideals in her backfires as she gets older.

At the novel's outset, Jōji gives the superficial appearance of being the dominant partner in the relationship. However, it soon becomes apparent that Naomi possesses a notably higher degree of social intelligence (and cunning) than her shy and awkward benefactor. As Naomi matures into a beautiful young woman, she learns to exploit the full potential of her sexual appeal, and when Jōji discovers that she has been cheating on him with multiple younger men, his admiration and fascination turn to jealousy and hysterical obsession. Seizing the propitious moment, Naomi adroitly takes the reins and proceeds to train her serially cuckolded husband, in Pavlovian fashion, to comply with her every selfish demand. Presently we find her toying with him, playing "tease and denial" and other manipulative head games. Distraught with frustrated desire, on the verge of a nervous breakdown, Jōji suddenly submits unconditionally, promising to agree to whatever she wishes, so long as she never leave him. She agrees to this proposal only providing that he comply with a series of non-negotiable, draconian terms:

- He is to address and refer to her as Miss Naomi.
- He is to have no intimate contact with her, except for the occasional "friend's kiss" as reward for "good behavior."
- He must sleep alone in a separate small bedroom, while she is free to entertain an ongoing series of lovers in her more spacious adjoining boudoir.
- He must give her half of his salary as an allowance in perpetuity.

She regularly subjects him to treatment that he once resented, but now finds titillating and anticipates with enthusiasm. His only request is that she remain with him and maintain his attachment to her.

== Main characters ==
- Jōji – The narrator and protagonist: a well-educated 28-year-old man from a wealthy landlord family. He wishes to break from tradition and moves to the city to work as an electrical engineer. He meets Naomi when she is 15, and takes her under his wing to educate her. He becomes obsessed with her and gives her everything she desires. Later he marries Naomi and allows himself to be dominated by her.
- Naomi – The antagonist: a beautiful girl with Western-like features, including her name. She is uneducated but seems to embody Western culture, albeit in a superficial way. Naomi enjoys Western activities like going to movies and looking at the pictures in Western magazines. She is the perfect example of a modern girl ("moga," short for "modern girl") (garu) with few inhibitions, and is sexually aggressive and promiscuous. Naomi is also narcissistic, calculating, highly perceptive of human behavior and naturally manipulative. By the story's conclusion, she has succeeded in imposing a set of non-negotiable, self-serving conditions, as well as a reversal of traditional gender roles, on her hapless but ultimately willing husband.

== Background ==
Before Jun'ichirō Tanizaki wrote Naomi, he lived in Yokohama, a city near to Tokyo and full of Western influences. He was forced to move after 1923 Great Kantō earthquake devastated much of Tokyo and Yokohama. The earthquake caused extensive damage, and many occupants of Tokyo and other major cities had to relocate. Tanizaki moved to Kyoto, where he spent much of the rest of his life writing works of fiction. In 1949 Tanizaki won the Imperial Cultural Prize, the highest honor awarded to artists in Japan, for his various works of literature. He was nominated for a Nobel Prize for his lifetime achievements before his death in 1965.

Tanizaki wrote Naomi in his late 30s, during the Japanese Industrial Revolution when Western influences took root in Japan, continuing the trajectory of the Meiji period, when Western ideas were first introduced. During this time Japan was transitioning from an unindustrialized nation to an industrialized, economic super-power. The novel reflects the perspective of a man shifting between modern and traditional Japan, and the conflicts associated with the era.

According to Anthony H. Chambers, in his Introduction to his translation of the book, the character Naomi was based upon Tanizaki's sister-in-law, who had learned to dance from a Western friend and who inspired his own interest in dancing.

During the teens and twenties, a woman's role in society was drastically changing. In the early stages of the Meiji Restoration, women were limited to working in textile factories. These factories provided dormitories for the workers, who sent back their wages to their families in the countryside. However, during the teens and twenties, women started to take on other jobs as more population moved into the cities. The shift from country living to modern urban living, along with a growing adoption of Western culture, created a new niche in society for women. The arrival of Western fashion and cosmetics spawned numerous job opportunities. Women became sales associates in department stores, or worked in service related jobs (in Naomi's case as a café waitress). This transition from country to city allowed many women to become independent of their families and employers. The fact of these women beginning to choose their own men created more shock than their career independence. They lived on their own without being a subordinate to any men (including fathers and husbands). Tanizaki's character Naomi, a 15-year-old girl living in the city, is a perfect example of this new class of women. Culture critics picked up Tanizaki's term modan garu, from the English "modern girl", to describe this new class of women. "Modern girls" can be described as being independent, not bound by traditions or conventions, lacking Japanese grace but having tons of vitality, and holding apolitical views (not caring about women's suffrage).

In the first chapter, the name "Naomi" is written with three Chinese characters; since it sounds like a Western name, Jōji chooses to write her name in katakana, the Japanese syllabary used for writing out and sounding out foreign words.

Irony occurs when readers learn that although Jōji's knowledge of English grammar is excellent, his accent prevents him from truly mastering English. Conversely, Naomi pronounces English very well, but cannot string together a correct sentence. Naomi also loves superficiality and is passionate about Western theatre and culture. An example of how Naomi loves Western culture but does not truly belong is her purchases of Western magazines, despite being able only to look at the pictures, because of her inability to read English. Tanizaki portrays the traditional Japanese man being seduced by the siren's song of Western culture only to be trapped by it.

Tanizaki's writing is applauded by literary critics for his ability to turn a glum café waitress with Eurasian features into a manipulative succubus. He shows the irony of both sexual and cultural conquest, and sums it up in the opening paragraph of his book: "As Japan grows increasingly cosmopolitan, Japanese and foreigners are eagerly mingling with one another; all sorts of new doctrines and philosophies are being introduced; and both men and women are adopting up-to-date Western fashions."

== Controversy ==
Naomi was met with controversy upon its publication. When Osaka Morning News published it in 1924, opposing reactions to the novel arose from two different demographics. The younger generation embraced the modan garu lifestyle embodied by Naomi, who provided a role model for independent young women in Japan's cities. On the other hand, the character's aggressive sexuality and manipulation shocked the older generation of Japanese, who deemed the story too obscene and risqué to be published. The Osaka Morning News pulled the story due to extensive pressure put on them by their readers. Because of the popularity of the story, however, the magazine Josei picked up the story from Tanizaki and published the remaining parts of the novel.

== Cultural impact ==
The release of Naomi aroused young women of the time to engage in a cultural revolution. There was a boom of moga; working-class women who work and choose men for themselves, not for the sake of their families. Traditionally, girls who wished to work lived in factory dormitories and send their wages home to their family. Mogas worked to maintain their fashionable lifestyle, living in the city and being independent. They were a hot topic in 1920s Japan. The media would discuss their characteristics, characterizing them in various ways; one media group suggested that modern girls were independent, non-traditional girls; another suggested that modern girls spoke more like men. All groups agreed modern girls were very Westernized women who refused to recognize gender and class boundaries. The modern girls movement in Japan was strikingly similar to the flapper movement in the United States in the same period.

The other class explicitly shown in Naomi is the middle management, white-collar-class males. In the story, Jōji is known to be a skilled, educated worker from a well-off rural family. He is the embodiment of a new class of Japanese salarymen. After the Meiji Restoration, the educated males moved into the cities to attend universities and become white-collar business workers as opposed to the farmers, artisans, and merchants of the past. Jōji is unusual because he belongs to upper-level management. In the novel, he did work hard initially and proved to be a trustworthy and reliable colleague, however as his work position was getting higher at the same time his obsession with Naomi were getting bigger, Jōji started to skip his work duty by only going into the office for a few hours each day. In contrast, the average salaryman works long working hours with little prestige, and with little hope of climbing the corporate hierarchy.

The novel also depicts the contrast between the naive country bumpkin (in this novel, Jōji) and the slick city dweller (Naomi), a common phenomenon in Japanese society and literature of the twentieth century.

The pen name Namio Harukawa was formed from an anagram of "Naomi", a reference to the novel, and the last name of actress Masumi Harukawa.

== Film adaptations ==
Naomi has been adapted for the cinema several times, a notable example being Yasuzo Masumura’s adaptation of Chijin no Ai (A Fool's Love) in 1967.

- Chijin no Ai (Directed by Yasuzo Masumura, Release date September 29, 1967)
- Michiyo Ōkusu : Naomi
- Shōichi Ozawa : George Kawai
- Masakazu Tamura : Nobuo Hamada
- Isao Kuraishi : Seitarō Kumagaya
- Sachiko Murase : Sumie
- Asao Uchida : Hanamura
- Noriko Hodaka : Yasuko Hanamura

== Publication history ==
- 1924, Japan, Osaka Morning News, March 1924, serialization (first half)
- 1924, Japan, Female magazine, 1924, serialization (second half)
- 1925, Japan, Kaizōsha hardcover
- 1947, Japan, Shinchōsha ISBN 4-10-100501-X, November 1947, paperback
- 1952, Japan, Kadokawa Shoten ISBN 4-04-100503-5, January 1952, paperback
- 1985, Japan, Chūōkōron Shinsha ISBN 4-12-201185-X, January 1985, paperback
- 1985, United States, tr. by Anthony H. Chambers, Knopf ISBN 0-394-53663-0, September 12, 1985, hardcover
- 2001, England, Vintage Books ISBN 0-375-72474-5, April 10, 2001, paperback
