= Zatoichi's Pilgrimage =

Japanese name
- Kanji: 座頭市海を渡る
Transcriptions
- Revised Hepburn: Zatōichi umi o wataru
- Directed by: Kazuo Ikehiro
- Written by: Kaneto Shindo
- Based on: Zatoichi by Kan Shimozawa
- Produced by: Ikuo Kubodera
- Starring: Shintaro Katsu; Michiyo Okusu; Isao Yamagata
- Cinematography: Senkichiro Takeda
- Edited by: Toshio Taniguchi
- Music by: Ichirō Saitō
- Production company: Daiei Studios
- Release date: 13 August 1966 (Japan)
- Running time: 82 minutes
- Country: Japan
- Language: Japanese

Zatoichi's Pilgrimage (Japanese: 座頭市海を渡る, Hepburn: Zatōichi umi o wataru) is a 1966 Japanese chambara film directed by Kazuo Ikehiro and starring Shintaro Katsu as the blind masseur Zatoichi. It was originally released by the Daiei Motion Picture Company (later acquired by Kadokawa Pictures).

Zatoichi's Pilgrimage is the fourteenth episode in the 26-part film series devoted to the character of Zatoichi. It has also been known as Zatoichi's Ocean Voyage

== Plot ==
Seeking to atone for his violent past, Zatoichi (Katsu) embarks on a pilgrimage to visit the 88 Temples on Shikoku. On the road, a man (Igawa) attacks Zatoichi but is killed by him. Zatoichi follows the man's horse back to his home.

== Cast ==
- Shintaro Katsu as Zatoichi
- Michiyo Okusu as Okichi
- Isao Yamagata as Boss Tohachi
- Hisashi Igawa as Eigoro
- Masao Mishima as Gonbei
- Kunie Tanaka as storyteller

== Production ==
- Yoshinobu Nishioka – Art director

== Reception ==
=== Critical response ===
Thomas Raven, in a review for freakengine, wrote that "[t]his film represents another major step forward for the series. Director Kazuo Ikehiro's touch is exactly what Ichi's stories need and since this was his third Zatoichi picture, he'd honed his skills to a fine point. It certainly helps that the script is so crisp, as is the inventive cinematography and art direction. This is certainly one of the best looking of the first fourteen films."
