= Reona Hirota =

Japanese actress

- Born: 7 March 1963 (age 63); Sapporo, Hokkaido, Japan
- Other name: Leona Hirota,
- Occupation: Actress
- Years active: 1983–present

Reona Hirota (広田レオナ, Hirota Reona) is a Japanese actress. She won the Award for Best Supporting Actress at the 13th Yokohama Film Festival for Ōte and Yumeji. In 1994, she married the actor Mitsuru Fukikoshi. They divorced in 2005 after having one child.

== Filmography ==
- A Sign Days (1989)
- Ōte (1991)
- Yumeji (1991)
- Calmi Cuori Appassionati (2001)
- Kaidan (2007)
- Adrift in Tokyo (2007)
- Burn (2026), Masumi
