= Shochiku Studio =

Japanese film and production studio company

Shochiku Studio Co., Ltd.
- Native name: 株式会社松竹撮影所
- Romanized name: Kabushiki-gaisha Shōchiku Satsueijo
- Type: Subsidiary
- Industry: Entertainment (Film studio and Filmmaking)
- Founded: October 15th, 2008
- Headquarters: 12-9, Uzumasa Horigauchi-cho, Ukyo-ku, Kyoto, Japan
- Number of locations: 2
- Parent: Shochiku
- Divisions: Kyoto Studio; Tokyo Studio
- Website: www.shochiku-ks.com/en/

Shochiku Studio Co., Ltd. (株式会社松竹撮影所, Kabushiki gaisha Shōchiku Satsueijo) is a Japanese film and production studio company of Shochiku Group, which has been producing movies and dramas for roughly a century, being the second-oldest motion picture company in Japan.

The company has production bases in Kyoto and Tokyo since its inception in the 1920s, and the long-established Shochiku Kyoto Studio (松竹京都撮影所, Shōchiku Kyōto Satsueijo) is equipped with a studio facility that is deeply rooted in tradition.

It has also worked on the production of Hollywood films such as "The Last Samurai".

Shochiku Studio is known for productions of many Japanese period dramas, movies, TV and commercials.

== History ==
=== Studios and Owners ===
Shochiku Studio based in Tokyo and Kanagawa

Year	Name	Location	Owner
1920 - 1935	Shochiku Kamata Studio	Kamata, Tokyo	Shochiku Kinema
1936 - 2000	Shochiku Ofuna Studio	Ofuna, Kanagawa	Shochiku Co., Ltd.
2011 - present	Shochiku Tokyo Studio	Tsukiji, Tokyo	Shochiku Studio Co., Ltd.

Shochiku Studio based in Shimogamo, Kyoto

Year	Name	Owner	Notes
1923	Shochiku Shimogamo Studio	Shochiku Kinema	Kamata Studio was temporarily relocated to Kyoto
1925	-	-	Closed, relocated back to Kamata
1926	Shochiku Kyoto Studio	Shochiku Kinema	Re-opened and renamed
1937	Shochiku Uzumasa Studio	Shochiku Co., Ltd.	The owner's name was changed.
1952	Kyoto Film Studio	Kyoto Eiga Co., Ltd.	Shochiku transferred the studio in Shimogamo to its subsidiary, Kyoto Eiga
1975	-	-	Closed

Shochiku Studio based in Uzumasa, Kyoto

Year	Name	Owner	Notes
1935	Makino Talkie Production	Makino Talkie Co., Ltd.	
1940	Shochiku Uzumasa Studio	Shochiku Co., Ltd.	
1952	Shochiku Kyoto Studio	Shochiku Co., Ltd.	Shochiku relocated its production base from Shimogamo to Uzumasa and rename the studio in Uzumasa.
1965	-	-	Closed by reorganization of Shochiku group
1975	Kyoto Film Studio	Kyoto Eiga Co., Ltd.	The studio in Shimogamo was relocated to Uzumasa
1995	Kyoto Film Studio	Shochiku Kyoto Eiga Co., Ltd.	The owner's name was changed.
2008	Shochiku Kyoto Studio	Shochiku Kyoto Studio Co., Ltd.	Renamed when the owner was changed to the successor of Shochiku Kyoto Eiga
2011	Shochiku Kyoto Studio	Shochiku Studio Co., Ltd.	The owner's name was changed when Shochiku Tokyo Studio was established.

=== 1920s - 1930s ===
Shochiku built Shochiku Kamata Studio (松竹蒲田撮影所, Shōchiku Kamata Satsueijo) as its main studio at Kamata, Tokyo in 1920.

In 1923, Shochiku Kamata studio was heavily damaged by Great Kantō earthquake, forcing a temporary relocation to Kyoto, in which the predecessor of current Shochiku Kyoto Studio was established. The temporary studio in Shimogamo, Kyoto, called as Shochiku Shimogamo Studio (松竹下加茂撮影所, Shōchiku Shimogamo Satsueijo), was closed in June 1925 and re-opened in January 1926 as Shochiku Kyoto Studio.

Shiro Kido (城戸四郎, Kido Shirō), the executive placed in charge of reconstruction at Kamata, was permitted to make films with the remaining staff. Together with young directors like Yasujirō Ozu, Heinosuke Gosho, Hiroshi Shimizu and Torajirō Saitō and Shintarō Kido produced Shomin-geki (films about ordinary folks, including company employees who were part of a rising urban middle class).

Filming became increasingly difficult at Shochiku Kamata Studio during the 1930s with the rapid industrialization of the surrounding area, and in 1936 Shochiku decided to relocate the studio to Ofuna, called as Shochiku Ofuna Studio (松竹大船撮影所, Shōchiku Ōfuna Satsueijo).

The studio's first talking film, Madam-to-Nyobo was produced in 1931.

=== 1940s - 1980s ===
Legendary film directors shot at Shochiku Ofuna Studio such as Nagisa Ōshima led Japanese Nouvelle Vague, a group of filmmakers under Japanese New Wave Film movement which was characterized in its anti-authority. Together with Masahiro Shinoda and Yoshishige Yoshida, who are also known as the filmmakers worked at Shochiku during the 1950s to 1960s, they were leading so-called Shochiku Nouvelle Vague (松竹ヌーヴェルヴァーグ, Shōchiku Nuberu Bagu).

In 1940, Shochiku purchased a studio in Uzumasa, Ukyō-ku, Kyoto, built by Masahiro Makino as Makino Talkie Studio (マキノトーキー製作所, makino tōki seisakujo) in 1936 and set it up as Shochiku Uzumasa Studio (松竹太秦撮影所, Shōchiku Uzumasa Satsueijo).

Kyoto Eiga Co., Ltd. (京都映画株式会社, Kyōto Eiga Kabushiki gaisha), the predecessor of the company, was founded in 1946 and later on in 1952 became a subsidiary of Shochiku. Shochiku transferred its studio in Shimogamo named "Shochiku Kyoto Studio" to Kyoto Eiga, followed by a change in its name to Kyoto Film Studio (京都映画撮影所, Kyōto Eiga Satsueijo) in 1952. Shochiku relocated its production base to Uzumasa and name of the studio in Uzumasa was changed to Shochiku Kyoto Studio.

In 1975, Shochiku transferred the Studio in Uzumasa to Kyoto Eiga while Kyoto Eiga closed the studio in Shimogamo and relocated its production base to Uzumasa.

=== 1990s - Present ===
In 1995, Kyoto Eiga Co., Ltd. changed its name to Shochiku Kyoto Eiga Co., Ltd. (松竹京都映画株式会社, Shōchiku Kyōto Eiga Kabushiki gaisha).

In the same year Shochiku Ofuna Studio transformed into a theme park, Kamakura Cinema World (鎌倉シネマワールド), but in 1998 it became inoperational, and its site was sold to Kamakura Women's University in 2000. Thereon, Shochiku has relied on its film studio and backlot in Kyoto.

The company, Shochiku Kyoto Studio Co., Ltd. (株式会社松竹京都撮影所, Kabushiki gaisha Shōchiku Kyōto Satsueijo), was founded in 2008 as the successor of Shochiku Kyoto Eiga and Kyoto Film Studio with the name changed to its the current studio name, i.e., Shochiku Kyoto Studio.

In 2011, The company's name was changed to its current name, i.e., Shochiku Studio.

== See also ==
- List of Japanese movie studios
