= Kagero-za =

Kagerō-za
- Directed by: Seijun Suzuki
- Written by: Yōzō Tanaka; Kyōka Izumi (novel)
- Produced by: Genjirō Arato
- Starring: Yūsaku Matsuda; Michiyo Okusu; Katsuo Nakamura; Eriko Kusuda
- Cinematography: Kazue Nagatsuka
- Edited by: Akira Suzuki
- Music by: Kaname Kawachi
- Distributed by: Cinema Placet; Genjirō Amato Pictures
- Release date: July 31, 1981
- Running time: 139 minutes
- Country: Japan
- Language: Japanese

Kagerō-za (陽炎座, Heat-Haze Theatre) is a 1981 independent Japanese film directed by Seijun Suzuki and based on a novel by Kyōka Izumi. It forms the middle section of Suzuki's Taishō Roman Trilogy, preceded by Zigeunerweisen (1980) and followed by Yumeji (1991), surrealistic psychological dramas and ghost stories linked by style, themes and the Taishō period (1912–1926) setting. All were produced by Genjirō Arato.

== Plot ==
In 1926 Tokyo, a Shinpa playwright named Matsuzaki meets a beautiful married woman whose name he does not know. After two more chance encounters, the two spend the night together, but Matsuzaki is surprised to find that the room she is staying in belongs to Shinako, the wife of his patron, Baron Tamawaki.

Matsuzaki learns that Tamawaki has two wives. His first wife was a German woman named Irene whom he fell in love with while studying abroad. Tamawaki had her dye her blonde hair black and they returned to Japan together as a Japanese woman named Ine. However, Tamawaki later married Shinako, a count's daughter whom he won over with the power of money. Matsuzaki meets and talks with Ine on the stairs in front of the hospital. However, by that time, Ine should have already taken her last breath in her hospital room.

Matsuzaki receives a letter from Shinako saying she will wait for him in Kanazawa. Matsuzaki hurries to the specified inn, knowing that their fourth rendezvous would be a life-risking one. Tamawaki also heads to Kanazawa, and continues to urge Matsuzaki to commit suicide with Shinako. Matsuzaki escapes and arrives at a strange theater called Kageroza. Shinako and Iwaki follow him. Children are performing at the Kagerouza Theatre. The play about monsters has suddenly become the story of Irene. Irene is tormented because she was supposed to become a wife but was forced to live in the shadows. Shinako also comes on stage and tells of her resentment at being forced to become a second wife, and how she had an affair with Matsuzaki in revenge.

The Kagerouza theater collapses, and the villagers cry out in excitement that a body has been found in the pond after a double suicide. The victims are Iwaki and Shinako. However, Matsuzaki believes that Shinako is not dead. As festival music reverberates, Matsuzaki finds Shinako in a mysterious room, bows to his real-world self, and sits back-to-back with Shinako.

== Cast ==
- Yūsaku Matsuda as Shunko Matsuzaki
- Michiyo Okusu as Shinako
- Katsuo Nakamura as Tamawaki
- Yoshio Harada as Wada
- Eriko Kusuda as Ine
- Mariko Kaga as Miyo
- Asao Sano
- Ryūtarō Ōtomo as Shishō
