= Seijun Suzuki =

Japanese film director (1923–2017)

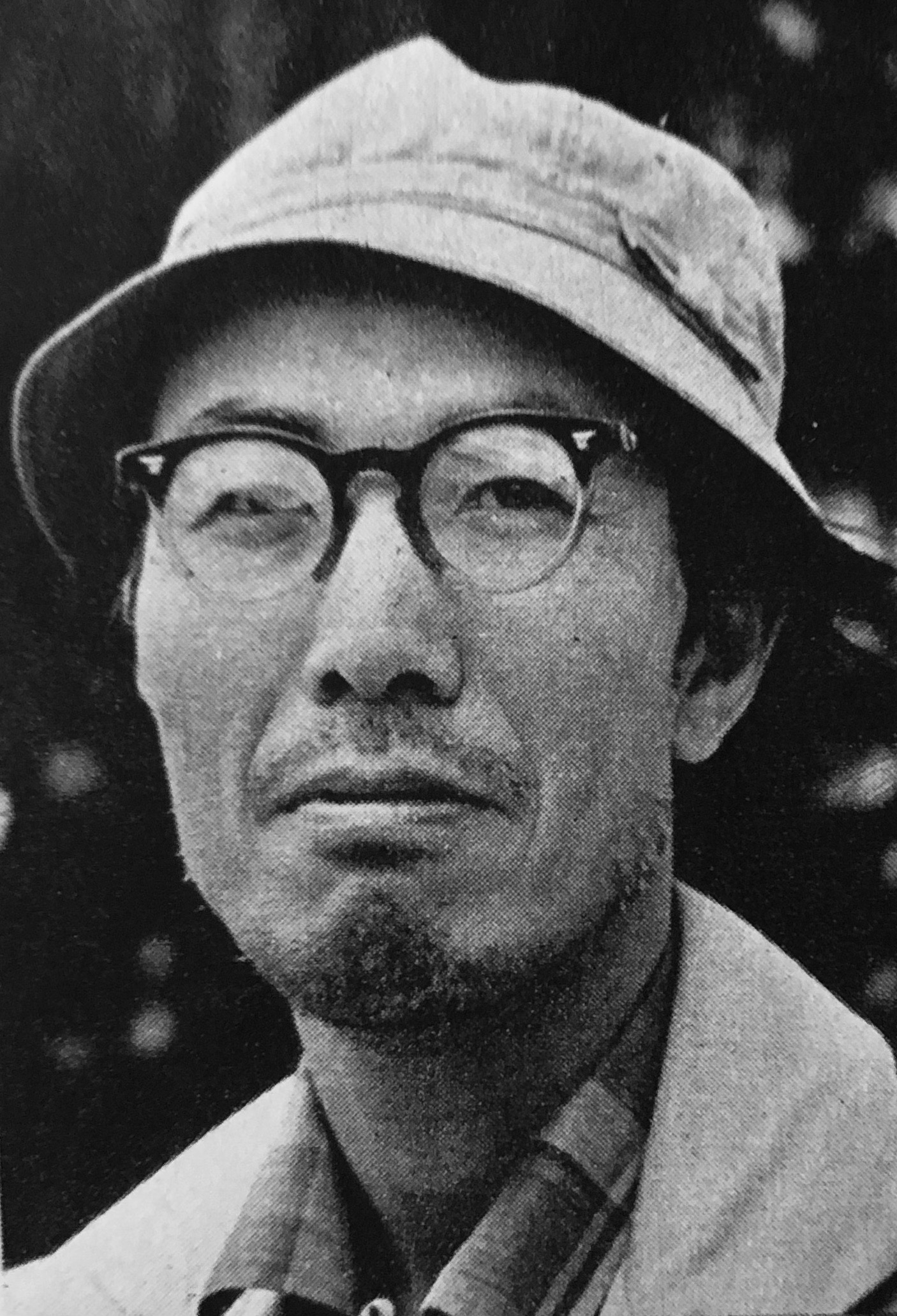
- Seitaro Suzuki circa 1962
- Born: Seitaro Suzuki; 24 May 1923; Nihonbashi, Tokyo, Imperial Japan
- Died: 13 February 2017 (aged 93); Tokyo, Japan
- Occupations: Film and television director, actor, writer
- Years active: 1956–2007

Seijun Suzuki (鈴木 清順, Suzuki Seijun), born Seitaro Suzuki (鈴木 清太郎, Suzuki Seitarō) (24 May 1923 – 13 February 2017), was a Japanese filmmaker, actor, and screenwriter. His films are known for their florid visual style, absurd humour, and a playful rejection of traditional film grammar. He made 40 predominately B-movies for the Nikkatsu Company between 1956 and 1967, working most prolifically in the yakuza genre. His increasingly surreal style began to draw the ire of the studio in 1963 and culminated in his ultimate dismissal for what is now regarded as his magnum opus, Branded to Kill (1967), starring notable collaborator Joe Shishido. Suzuki successfully sued the studio for wrongful dismissal, but he was blacklisted for 10 years after that. As an independent filmmaker, he won critical acclaim and a Japanese Academy Award for his Taishō trilogy, Zigeunerweisen (1980), Kagero-za (1981) and Yumeji (1991).

His films remained widely unknown outside Japan until a series of theatrical retrospectives beginning in the mid-1980s, home video releases of key films such as Branded to Kill and Tokyo Drifter in the late 1990s and tributes by such acclaimed filmmakers as Jim Jarmusch, Takeshi Kitano, Wong Kar-wai and Quentin Tarantino signaled his international discovery. Suzuki continued making films, albeit sporadically, until the early 2000s.

== Early life and career ==
Suzuki was born during the Taishō period, and three months before the Great Kantō earthquake, in the Nihonbashi Ward (now the Chūō Special Ward) in Tokyo. His younger brother, Kenji Suzuki (now a retired NHK television announcer), was born six years his junior. His family was in the textile trade. After earning a degree at a Tokyo Trade School in 1941, Suzuki applied to the college of the Ministry of Agriculture, but failed the entrance exam due to poor marks in chemistry and physics. A year later he successfully enrolled in a Hirosaki college.

In 1943, he was recruited by the Imperial Japanese Army during the national student mobilization to serve in World War II. Sent to East Abiko, Chiba, he was assigned the rank of Private Second Class. He was shipwrecked twice throughout his military service; first the cargo ship that was to take him to the front was destroyed by an American submarine and he fled to the Philippines. Later, the freighter that took him to Taiwan sank after an attack by the American air force, and he spent 7 or 8 hours in the ocean before being rescued. In 1946, having attained the rank of Second Lieutenant in the Meteorological Corps, he returned to Hirosaki and completed his studies. About his time in the military Suzuki wrote:

While I stayed in the army out of fear of being executed as a deserter as soon as I threw down my rifle and ran, it wasn't long before I was promoted to trainee officer with a salary of twelve-and-a-half yen, comparable at the time to that of a departmental manager in business life. I went to the Philippines, where the war took a wrong turn for us. Then I was transferred to Taiwan, where I was stationed at an isolated airport at the foot of a mountain, with twelve others. Our wages were divided into thirteen equal parts; as in a perfect communist system. To avoid the outbreak of a revolt because of sexual deprivation, we didn't just get food, clothing and shelter, but the army staff had also considered it strategically necessary to supply us with three army prostitutes. This isn't a very edifying story, but I can't help it: I spent most of my money on booze and women, and when I arrived at Tanabe harbor the year after liberation, I was completely destitute.

He has also said that he often found the horrors of war comical, such as men being hoisted on board his ship with ropes and being battered black and blue against the hull, or the bugler blasting his trumpet every time a coffin was thrown into the sea. Ian Buruma writes, "The humour of these situations might escape one who was not there. But Suzuki assures us that it was funny."

But war is very funny, you know! When you're in the middle of it, you can't help laughing. Of course it's different when you're facing the enemy. I was thrown into the sea during a bombing raid. As I was drifting, I got the giggles. When we were bombed, there were some people on the deck of the ship. That was a funny sight.

Next he applied to the prestigious University of Tokyo, but again failed the entrance exam. At the invitation of a friend, who had also failed the exam, Suzuki enrolled into the film department of the Kamakura Academy. In October 1948, he passed the Shochiku Company's entrance exam and was hired as an assistant director in the company's Ōfuna Studio. There he worked under directors Minora Shibuya, Yasushi Sasaki, Noboru Nakamura and Hideo Oniwa before joining the regular crew of Tsuruo Iwama.

I was a melancholy drunk, and before long I became known as a relatively worthless assistant director. At a large company such as Mitsui or Mitsubishi, these things would have led to my dismissal, especially in the old days, but as the studio as well as the assistant directors themselves were laboring under the strange misconception that they were brilliant artists, almost anything was tolerated, except arson, theft and murder. So I picked flowers for my wife during working hours, and when we were on location I stayed in the bus.

== Rise and fall at Nikkatsu ==
In 1954, the Nikkatsu Company reopened its doors after having ceased all film production at the onset of the war. It lured many assistant directors from the other major film studios with the promise of circumventing the usual long queue for promotion. Among these wayfarers was Suzuki, who took an assistant directing position there at approximately 3 times his previous salary. He worked under directors Hidesuke Takizawa, Kiyoshi Saeki, So Yamamura and Hiroshi Noguchi. His first screenplay to be filmed was Duel at Sunset (落日の決闘 Rakujitsu no ketto, 1955). It was directed by Hiroshi Noguchi. In 1956, he became a full-fledged director.

His directorial debut, credited to his real name, Seitarō Suzuki, was Victory Is Mine, a kayo eiga, or pop song film, part of a subgenre that functioned as a vehicle for hit pop records and singers. Impressed by the film's quality Nikkatsu signed him to a longterm contract. Nearly all of the films that he made for Nikkatsu were program pictures, or B-movies, production-line genre films made on a tight schedule and shoestring budget that were meant to fill out the second half of a double feature. B-directors were expected to work fast, taking any and every script that was assigned to them, and they refused scripts only at the risk of being dismissed. Suzuki maintained an impressive pace, averaging 3½ films per year, and claims to have turned down only 2 or 3 scripts during his years at the studio. He later said of his work schedule (and wrongful dismissal):

Actually making movies was painful work, as I often said to my wife. I had already wanted to quit four or five years before. I told her I hated this foolish, painful process. She told me I shouldn't say such a thing ... that if I talked that way, it would come true. And it eventually did. [This alludes to his unfair dismissal from Nikkatsu in 1968.] For me, it was a relief. I felt this way from the very start.

His third film and first yakuza action movie, Satan's Town, linked him inexorably to the genre. Underworld Beauty (1958) marked his first CinemaScope film and was also the first to be credited to his pseudonym Seijun Suzuki.

Having enjoyed moderate success, his work began to draw more attention, especially among student audiences, with 1963's Youth of the Beast which is considered his "breakthrough" by film scholars. Suzuki himself calls it his "first truly original film." His style increasingly shirked genre conventions, favouring visual excess and visceral excitement over a coherent plot and injecting madcap humour into a normally solemn genre, developing into a distinctive "voice". Tony Rayns explained, "In his own eyes, the visual and structural qualities of his '60s genre films sprang from a mixture of boredom ('All company scripts were so similar; if I found a single line that was original, I could see room to do something with it') and self-preservation ('Since all of us contract directors were working from identical scripts, it was important to find a way of standing out from the crowd')."

If you hear the word B-movie, you will probably laugh heartily, but a B-movie director has his own worries. In newspaper ads the main feature usually has the most prominent place, and I'm way down at the bottom. The B-movie director's biggest worry is the question 'What effect will the main feature have that is shown before your film?' Films from Nikkatsu usually have the same plot: the main character falls in love with a woman, he kills the bad guy and gets the woman. This pattern is repeated in every film, so you concentrate on finding out all you can about who the actors are, who the director is, and the approach this director has. This is what the B-movie director does. For instance, the main feature's director has a habit of filming a love scene a certain way; this means that I have to handle it in another way. The director of the main feature has it easy. He doesn't have to find out how I work at all. He can just do whatever he wants. So actually a B-movie director has a harder task than his colleague who does the main feature. Because of this the studio should give me more money than him, actually, but it's just the other way around.

This development was furthered with the assistance of like-minded collaborators. Suzuki considered the production designer to be among the most important:

The Bastard was the real turning-point in my career, more so than Youth of the Beast, which I made just before. It was my first time with [Takeo Kimura] as designer, and that collaboration was decisive for me. It was with Kimura that I began to work on ways of making the fundamental illusion of cinema more powerful.

His fan base grew rapidly, but did not extend to studio president Kyusaku Hori. Beginning with Tattooed Life, the studio issued Suzuki his first warning for "going too far". He responded with Carmen from Kawachi after which he was ordered to "play it straight" and had his budget slashed for his next film. The result was Tokyo Drifter, an "ostensibly routine potboiler" made into a "jaw-dropping, eye-popping fantasia". Further reduced to filming in black-and-white Suzuki made his 40th film in his 12 years with the company, Branded to Kill (1967), considered an avant-garde masterpiece by critics, for which Hori promptly fired him.

== Suzuki v. Nikkatsu ==
On 25 April 1968, Suzuki received a telephone call from a Nikkatsu secretary informing him that he would not be receiving his salary for that month. Two friends of Suzuki met with Hori the next day and were informed that "Suzuki's films were incomprehensible, that they did not make any money and that Suzuki might as well give up his career as a director as he would not be making films for any other companies." At that time the student-run film society Cine Club, headed by Kazuko Kawakita, was sponsoring a major retrospective of Suzuki's films; meant to be the first in Japan to honour a Japanese director. It was scheduled to begin on 10 May, but Hori withdrew all of his films from distribution and refused to release them to the Cine Club. The students were told that "Nikkatsu could not afford to cultivate a reputation for making films understood only by an exclusive audience and that showing incomprehensible and thus bad films would disgrace the company," adding that, "Suzuki's films would not be shown for some time in theaters or by the Cine Club."

Suzuki reported the illegal termination of his contract and the removal of his films from distribution to the Japanese Film Directors Association. Association chairman Heinosuke Gosho met with Hori on 2 May, but was unable to resolve the matter. Gosho then issued a public declaration condemning Nikkatsu for breach of contract and violation of Suzuki's right to freedom of speech. On the day of the intended retrospective, the Cine Club met to discuss the situation. Two hundred people attended, much exceeding their expectations. A three-hour debate ensued as to whether they should negotiate the release of the films, or confront Nikkatsu directly. The former was agreed upon and it was decided that efforts had to be made to keep the public informed.

On 7 June, after repeated attempts to reason with Nikkatsu, Suzuki took the studio to court, suing for breach of contract and personal damages amounting to ¥7 380 000. He also demanded that Hori send letters of apology to the three major newspapers on the ground that Hori's statements gave the impression that all of his films were bad. He then called a press conference with representatives of the Directors Guild of Japan, the Actors Guild, the Scriptwriters Guild, ATG and the Cine Club. Among the participants were directors Nagisa Oshima, Masahiro Shinoda and Kei Kumai. The only group not represented was the Nikkatsu Directors Association.

The Cine Club held a public demonstration on 12 June, which resulted in the formation of a joint committee supporting Suzuki against Nikkatsu. The committee was composed mostly of directors, actors, large student film groups and independent filmmakers. This also marked the first time the public became involved in a type of dispute normally confined to the industry. The Cine Club, and other similar groups, mobilized the public, holding panel discussions and leading mass demonstrations against the studio. The public support, garnered at the height of student movement, was based on a wide appreciation of Suzuki's films and the idea that audiences should be able to see the types of films they wanted to see. This shook the film industry by the fact that the public was making demands rather than passively accepting their product.

Throughout the lawsuit, 19 witnesses were heard over a two and a half-year process including directors, newspaper reporters, film critics and two members of the film-going public. Kohshi Ueno writes of Suzuki's own testimony on the making of Branded to Kill, "A film scheduled for production was suddenly deemed inappropriate and Suzuki was called in at very short notice to fill the gap. The release date had already been set when Suzuki was asked to write the script. He suggested dropping the script when the head of the studio told him he had to read it twice before he understood it, but the company directed him to make the film. According to Suzuki, Nikkatsu was in no position to criticize him for a film that he made to help them out in an emergency." Suzuki had never before disclosed this information or discussed any internal company affairs and his testimony exposed the fact that the major studios assigned films to directors at random, improperly publicized them and expected directors to carry any blame.

It also came to light that, with the industry in decline since the early 1960s, by 1968 Nikkatsu was in the midst of a financial crisis. The studio had accumulated a ¥1 845 000 000 debt due to irresponsible management and was to undergo a massive restructuring. Film crew sizes were to be reduced, time cards introduced and advanced approval was required for all overtime. Hori, known as a totalitarian figure, unaccustomed to retracting statements or granting requests, had made an example of Suzuki apparently on the basis of his dislike of the film. In a New Year's speech to the company he repeatedly emphasized that he wanted to make films that were "easily understandable".

On 12 February 1971 testimony was completed and a verdict expected. However, in March the court advised a settlement, explaining appeals were extremely time-consuming. Negotiations began on 22 March and concluded on 24 December, three and a half years after the case had begun. Nikkatsu paid Suzuki a fraction of his original claim, and Hori was forced to apologize for comments he made while serving as president. In a separate agreement Nikkatsu donated Fighting Elegy and Branded to Kill to the Tokyo National Museum of Modern Art's Film Centre. At the time of settlement Suzuki expressed fears that if he had continued to fight he might not even be able to get an apology from the failing company. During the course of the litigation Nikkatsu was being slowly dismantled. Hori's plans to restructure the company were unsuccessful and Nikkatsu was forced to liquidate studios and headquarter buildings. It released two final films in August 1971 and by November began producing roman porno, softcore romantic pornography. Despite Suzuki's victory with wide support from the public and film world he was blacklisted by all major production companies and unable to make another film for 10 years.

== Late recognition ==
To sustain himself during the trial and the blacklist years that followed, Suzuki published books of essays, and directed several television movies, series and commercials. The trial and protests had made him into a countercultural icon and his Nikkatsu films became quite popular at midnight screenings, playing to "packed audiences who wildly applauded." He also began acting for other directors in small parts and cameos. His first credited screen role was a special appearance in Kazuki Omori's Don't Wait Until Dark! (1975). Shochiku, the company that started him as an assistant director, produced his return to film direction in 1977, A Tale of Sorrow and Sadness, a golf expose cum psychological thriller penned by sports-oriented manga illustrator Ikki Kajiwara. Joe Shishido appears in a brief cameo. The film was met poorly critically and popularly.

Suzuki collaborated with producer Genjiro Arato in 1980 and made the first part of what would become his Taishō trilogy, Zigeunerweisen, a psychological, period, ghost story, named after a gramophone record of gypsy violin music by Pablo de Sarasate featured prominently in the film. When exhibitors declined to show the film, Arato screened it himself in an inflatable mobile dome to great success. It won Honourable Mention at the 31st Berlin International Film Festival, was nominated for 9 Japanese Academy Awards and won four, including best director and best film, and was voted the no. 1 Japanese film of the 1980s by Japanese critics. He followed the film with Kagero-za, made the following year, and completed the trilogy ten years later with Yumeji. Suzuki commented on working outside of the studio system:

Speaking very practically, I don't change as a filmmaker. But the studio system offered a very convenient way of working, and independent filmmaking is different. At Nikkatsu, if I had an idea in the morning, it could be implemented by the afternoon in the studio. It's much more complicated now. I guess I'm still trying to use locations as I once used the studio, but the problem of lighting makes it hard. In the studio, you have lighting gantries to hang lights from. Setting up lights at a location takes so long.

From 1978 to 1980, Suzuki served as a "chief director" (supervisor) on the popular anime series Lupin the Third Part II, itself influenced by his earlier films. He would return to the Lupin III franchise twice more, scripting the thirteenth episode of Lupin the 3rd Part III: The Pink Jacket Adventures and co-directing (with Shigetsugu Yoshida) its associated film, Legend of the Gold of Babylon, in 1985. According to Lupin III researcher Takeshi Ikemoto, Suzuki's directorial credit on Legend of the Gold of Babylon was likely honorary, as there was a contemporary trend of crediting notable live-action directors on anime films to garner publicity, but it is also probable that his style did influence the production.

Italy hosted the first partial retrospective of his films outside Japan at the 1984 Pesaro International Film Festival. The 1994 touring retrospective Branded to Thrill: The Delirious Cinema of Suzuki Seijun showcased 14 of his films. In 2001, Nikkatsu hosted the Style to Kill retrospective featuring more than 20 of his films. In celebration of 50th anniversary of his directorial debut Nikkatsu again hosted the 2006 Suzuki Seijun 48 Film Challenge showcasing all of his films to date at the Tokyo International Film Festival.

He made a loose sequel to Branded to Kill with Pistol Opera (2001). Makiko Esumi replaced Joe Shishido as the number 3 killer. This was followed by Princess Raccoon (2005), starring Zhang Ziyi, a musical love story. In a 2006 interview, he said that he had no plans to direct any further films, citing health concerns. He had been diagnosed with pulmonary emphysema and was permanently hooked up to a portable respirator. However, he attended the 2008 Tokyo Project Gathering, a venue serving film financing and international co-productions, and pitched a film titled A Goldfish of the Flame.

== Death ==
Seijun Suzuki died on 13 February 2017 at a Tokyo hospital. His death was announced by Nikkatsu. He died of chronic obstructive pulmonary disease.

== Filmmaking technique ==
As a contract B director at Nikkatsu, Suzuki's films were made following a rigid structure. He was assigned a film and script, and could only refuse it at the risk of losing his job. He claims to have turned down only 2 or 3 scripts in his time with Nikkatsu but always modified the scripts both in preproduction and during shooting. Nikkatsu also assigned an actor for the lead, or leads, either a (usually 2nd-tier) star or one being groomed for stardom. The rest of the cast was not assigned but typically drawn from the studio's pool of contract actors. Most studio A films had a set budget of ¥45 million where Suzuki's black-and-white Bs ran 20 million and his colour films were provided an additional 3 million. His films were scheduled 10 days for pre-production, such as location scouting, set design and costumes, 25 days for shooting and 3 days for post-production, such as editing and dubbing. Within this framework he had a greater degree of control than the A directors as the cheaper B productions drew a less watchful eye from the head office.
