= Genjiro Arato =

Japanese film producer, actor and director (1946–2016)

Genjirō Arato
- Born: 10 October 1946; Nagasaki, Japan
- Died: 7 November 2016 (aged 70); Tokyo, Japan
- Occupations: Film producer, director, actor

Genjirō Arato (荒戸 源次郎, Arato Genjirō; 10 October 1946 – 7 November 2016) was a Japanese film producer, actor and director.

== Career ==
In 1980, Arato produced Zigeunerweisen for director Seijun Suzuki. He was unable to secure exhibitors for the film and famously exhibited it himself in a specially-built, inflatable, mobile tent. The film won four Japanese Academy Awards, including Best Picture, and was voted the best Japanese film of the 1980s by Japanese critics. He also produced Tatsushi Ōmori's The Whispering of the Gods in 2005.

In 1995, Arato directed The Girl of the Silence, which stars Mami Nakamura and Kaori Momoi. He returned with the 2003 film, Akame 48 Waterfalls, starring Takijirō Ōnishi, Michiyo Okusu and Shinobu Terajima. His 2010 film, The Fallen Angel, starred Toma Ikuta.

He died of ischemic heart disease on 7 November 2016 at the age of 70.

== Filmography ==
=== Producer ===
- Zigeunerweisen (1980)
- Kagerō-za (1981)
- Knockout (1989)
- Tekken (1990)
- Checkmate (1991)
- Yumeji (1991)
- The Operating Room (1992)
- Tokarefu (1994)
- The Whispering of the Gods (2005)

=== Director ===
- The Girl of the Silence (1995)
- Akame 48 Waterfalls (2003)
- The Fallen Angel (2010)
