= Ōte =

- Film poster
- Directed by: Junji Sakamoto
- Written by: Junji Sakamoto; Toshiaki Toyoda
- Produced by: Genjiro Arato; Yukiko Shii
- Starring: Hidekazu Akai; Masaya Kato; Reona Hirota; Yūko Nitō; Nobuo Kaneko
- Cinematography: Akihiro Itō
- Edited by: Ken'ichi Takashima
- Music by: Shigeru Umebayashi
- Production companies: Genjiro Arato Pictures; Apollo; MBS; Mitsubishi Group
- Distributed by: Cinema Placet
- Release date: 25 November 1991 (Japan)
- Running time: 102 minutes
- Country: Japan
- Language: Japanese

Ōte (Japanese: 王手), also known in English as Checkmate or Check, is a 1991 Japanese film directed by Junji Sakamoto.

== Cast ==
- Hidekazu Akai as Ayumi Tobita
- Masaya Kato as Ryuzo Kayama
- Reona Hirota as Terumi
- Yūko Nitō as Kanako Shimada
- Nobuo Kaneko as Tennoji
- Tomisaburo Wakayama as Sanae Mitamura
- Sakae Umezu as Seiji Komada

== Reception ==
Ōte was chosen as the 3rd Best Film at the 13th Yokohama Film Festival. Reona Hirota also won the Award for Best Supporting Actress.
