= Michiyo Ōkusu =

Chinese-born Japanese actress (born 1946)

Michiyo Okusu
- Born: February 27, 1946 (age 80); Tianjin, China
- Occupation: Actress
- Years active: 1964–present

Michiyo Okusu (大楠 道代, Ōkusu Michiyo; born February 27, 1946) is a Chinese-born Japanese actress. She has been nominated for four Japanese Academy Awards, and won the 1981 Outstanding Performance by an Actress in a Supporting Role prize for her performance in Zigeunerweisen. She began her career as a film ingenue using the stage name Michiyo Yasuda, under which she scored major early successes with films such as A Fool's Love and numerous love stories and "samurai" period piece dramas.

== Selected filmography ==
- Zatoichi's Pilgrimage (1966)
- A Fool's Love (1967)
- The Yoshiwara Story (1968)
- Lady Sazen and the Drenched Swallow Sword (1969)
- Onna Gokuakuchō (1970)
- Lone Wolf and Cub: Baby Cart in the Land of Demons (1973)
- Zigeunerweisen (1980)
- Kagero-za (1981)
- Location (1984)
- Shinran: Path to Purity (1987)
- Bedtime Eyes (1987)
- Bu Su (1987)
- Yumeji (1991)
- Face (2000)
- Zatōichi (2003)
- Akame 48 Waterfalls (2003)
- Hanging Garden (2005)
- Spring Snow (2005)
- The Two in Tracksuits (2008)
- The Fallen Angel (2010)
- Someday (2011)
- I'm Flash! (2012)
- The Projects (2016)
- I Never Shot Anyone (2020)

== Honours ==
- Kinuyo Tanaka Award (2011)
