= Yumeji =

- Film poster
- Directed by: Seijun Suzuki
- Written by: Yōzō Tanaka
- Produced by: Genjiro Arato
- Starring: Kenji Sawada; Tomoko Mariya; Yoshio Harada
- Cinematography: Junichi Fujisawa
- Edited by: Akira Suzuki
- Music by: Kaname Kawachi; Shigeru Umebayashi
- Distributed by: Cinema Placet; Genjiro Amato Pictures
- Release date: May 31, 1991
- Running time: 128 minutes
- Country: Japan
- Language: Japanese

Yumeji (Japanese: 夢二) is a 1991 independent Japanese film directed by Seijun Suzuki. It is a semi-faithful account of the life of poet and painter Takehisa Yumeji. It also forms the final part of Suzuki's Taishō Roman Trilogy, preceded by Zigeunerweisen (1980) and Kagero-za (1981), surrealistic psychological dramas and ghost stories linked by style, themes and the Taishō period (1912-1926) setting. All three were produced by Genjiro Arato.

The film was screened in the Un Certain Regard section at the 1991 Cannes Film Festival.

== Cast ==
- Kenji Sawada as Takehisa Yumeji
- Tomoko Mariya as Tomoyo
- Yoshio Harada as Sokichi Wakiya
- Masumi Miyazaki as Hikono
- Tamasaburo Bando as Gyoshu Inamura
- Reona Hirota as O-Yo
- Chikako Miyagi as Wet-nurse
- Kazuhiko Hasegawa as Onimatsu
- Michiyo Okusu as Landlady
- Akaji Maro as Criminal [i.e. detective]

== Other ==
"Yumeji's Theme", written by Shigeru Umebayashi, features prominently in Wong Kar-wai's 2000 film In the Mood for Love.
