= Yoshikazu Fukumura =

- Born: January 1, 1946; Tokyo, Japan
- Other name: 福村 芳一
- Occupation: conductor

Yoshikazu Fukumura (福村 芳一, Fukumura Yoshikazu; born 1946) is a Japanese conductor, formerly Music Director of the Tokyo City Ballet Company, Kyoto Symphony Orchestra, Nagoya Philharmonic Orchestra, and Sendai Philharmonic Orchestra. In 2016 he began his tenure as music director of the Philippine Philharmonic Orchestra.

== Orchestras ==
Fukumura has made recordings and conducted festivals and subscription concerts with the Hong Kong Philharmonic, Central Philharmonic Orchestra in Beijing, Shanghai Symphony Orchestra, Singapore Symphony Orchestra, KBS Symphony Orchestra in Seoul, Seoul Philharmonic, National Taiwan Symphony Orchestra, Philippine Philharmonic Orchestra, Vietnam National Symphony Orchestra, Bangkok Symphony, Pan Asian Philharmonic in Bangkok, Calcutta Foundation Orchestra in India, Cultural Center of the Philippines, Delhi Symphony Orchestra.
