= No Worries on the Recruit Front =

1991 film by Shūsuke Kaneko

- Directed by: Shūsuke Kaneko
- Written by: Shūsuke Kaneko; Takuro Fujita
- Produced by: Koichi Murakami; Takashige Ichise
- Edited by: Isao Tomita
- Music by: Kow Otani; Makihara Noriyuki
- Distributed by: Toho
- Release date: 22 June 1991
- Running time: 103 min.
- Language: Japanese

No Worries on the Recruit Front (就職戦線異状なし, Shūshoku sensen ijōnashi) is a 1991 Japanese film directed by Shūsuke Kaneko. The film gives a description of the life of students struggling to find a job at the end of college in Japan at the end of the 1980s, a time when companies would fight to get the best students to join their ranks. The title would be best translated into English as "All Quiet on the Recruit Front", as it is a pun on the Japanese title of the book by Erich Maria Remarque (Seibu sensen ijo nashi). Actress Emi Wakui won the Best Supporting Actress prizes at the Japan Academy Awards and the Yokohama Film Festival for her role in this film.

== Sources ==
- 就職戦線異状なし (in Japanese). Japanese Movie Database.
- Shushoku sensen ijonashi at IMDb
- 就職戦線異状なし (in Japanese). [ www.shusuke-kaneko.com].
- "Variety Japan" 就職戦線異状なし (in Japanese). Variety (Japanese edition).
