= Toshio Masuda filmography =

Filmography of Toshio Masuda

Between 1958 and 1992, Toshio Masuda directed 82 feature films, 52 of which occurred over a decade at the Nikkatsu Company.

Year	Title	Japanese	Romanization
1958	A Journey of Body and Soul	心と肉体の旅	Kokoro to nikutai no tabi
1958	Night Mist on Highway Two	夜霧の第二国道	Yogiri no dai-ni kokudō
1958	The Perfect Game	完全な遊戯	Kanzen'na yūgi
1958	Red Quay	赤い波止場	Akai hatoba
1958	Rusty Knife	錆びたナイフ	Sabita naifu
1958	7:50 from Haneda	羽田発７時５０分	Haneda hatsu 7 ji 50 pun
1959	Get Over Her	女を忘れろ	Onna o wasurero
1959	We Live Today	今日に生きる	Kyō ni ikiru
1959	A Man Explodes	男が爆発する	Otoko ga bakuhatsu suru
1959	The Man Who Risked Heaven and Earth, also known as The Sky Is Mine	天と地を駈ける男	Ten to chi o kakeru otoko
1959	Black Falling Leaves: The Sound of Youth	青春を吹き鳴らせ	Kuroi Rakuyo: Yori Seishun o Fuki Narase
1960	Yakuza Song	やくざの詩	Yakuza no Uta
1960	The Brawler	喧嘩太郎	Kenka Tarō
1960	Man at the Bullfight	闘牛に賭ける男	Togyu ni kakeru otoko
1960	The Day of Youth	青年の樹	Seinen no Ki
1961	Hotbed of Crime	生きていた野良犬	Ikite ita norainu
1961	Bodyguard Business, also known as Joe of Aces: Bodyguard	用心棒稼業	Yōjinbo kagyō
1961	Where the Horizon Meets the Sun	太陽、海を染めるとき	Taiyō umi o someru toki
1961	Lost in the Sun	太陽は狂ってる	Taiyō wa kurutteru
1961	Quiet Man of the Underworld	暗黒街の静かな男	Ankokugai no shizukana otoko
1962	Men and Women's Lullaby Game	男と男の生きる街	Otoko to otoko no ikiru machi
1962	Keep Your Chin Up, also known as I Look Up When I Walk	上を向いて歩こう	Ue o muite arukō
1962	The Zero Fighter	零戦黒雲一家	Zerosen kurokumo ikka
1962	The Two of Us Alone	ひとりぼっちの二人だが	Hitoribotchi no futari daga
1962	Hana and Ryu, also known as A Man with Dragon Tattoos	花と竜	Hana to Ryu
1963	Escape Into Terror	太陽への脱出	Taiyō e no dasshutsu
1963	Prince of Wolves	狼の王子	Ōkami no Ōji
1964	Red Handkerchief	赤いハンカチ	Akai hankachi
1964	Theater of Life	人生劇場	Jinsei Gekijō
1964	Kawachi Jokers	河内ぞろ どけち虫	Kawachi zoro: Dokechi mushi
1964	Kill the Killer	殺人者を消せ	Satsujinsha o Kese
1964	Kawachi Jokers: Cockfight Soldiers	河内ぞろ 喧嘩軍鶏	Kawachi zoro: Kenka shamo
1965	Taking The Castle	城取り	Shirotori
1965	Why Are We Young?	青春とはなんだ	Seishun to wa nanda
1965	Showdown in the Red Valley	赤い谷間の決斗	Akai tanima no kettō
1966	Blood Shed, also known as Blood-Stained Challenge	日本任侠伝 血祭り喧嘩状	Nihon ninkyōden: Chimatsuri kenkajō
1966	Kill the Night Rose	夜のバラを消せ	Yoru no bara o kese
1966	Challenge for Glory	栄光への挑戦	Eiko eno chōsen
1966	The Stormy Man	嵐を呼ぶ男	Arashi o yobu otoko
1967	The Man of Victory	星よ嘆くな 勝利の男	Hoshi yo nageku na: Shōri no otoko
1967	Velvet Hustler	紅の流れ星	Kurenai no Nagareboshi
1967	Duel, also known as Friendly Enemies	対決	Taiketsu
1967	The Endless Duel	血斗	Ketto
1967	The Storm Comes and Goes	嵐来たり去る	Arashi kitari saru
1968	Outlaw: Gangster VIP	「無頼」より 大幹部	Burai yori daikanbu
1968	Monument to the Girl's Corps	あゝひめゆりの塔	Aa himeyuri no tō
1968	Song of My Life	わが命の唄 艶歌	Waga inochi no uta enka
1968	Man of a Stormy Era	昭和のいのち	Showa no inochi
1969	The Fatal Raid	大幹部 殴り込み	Daikanbu Nagurikomi
1969	The Cleanup	嵐の勇者たち	Arashi no yushatachi
1969	Exiled to Hell	地獄の破門状	Jigoku no Hamonjo
1970	Spartan Education	スパルタ教育 くたばれ親父	Suparuta kyōiku kutabare oyaji
1970	Tora! Tora! Tora!	トラ・トラ・トラ！	Tora! Tora! Tora!
1971	Law of the Outlaw, also known as Farewell to the Code	さらば掟	Saraba Okite
1971	Challenge at Dawn	暁の挑戦	Akatsuki no chōsen
1972	Shadow Hunters	影狩り	Kage Gari
1972	Shadow Hunters 2: Echo of Destiny	影狩り ほえろ大砲	Kage Gari hoero taiho
1972	Sword and Flower	剣と花	Ken to Hana
1972	Chase That Man	追いつめる	Oitsumeru
1973	The Human Revolution	人間革命	Ningen kakumei
1974	Catastrophe 1999: The Prophecies of Nostradamus	ノストラダムスの大予言	Nosutoradamusu no daiyogen
1974	Orenochi wa Taninnochi	俺の血は他人の血	Orenochi wa Taninnochi
1976	The Human Revolution 2	続人間革命	Zoku ningen kakumei
1977	Space Battleship Yamato: The Movie	宇宙戦艦ヤマト 劇場版	Uchū Senkan Yamato: Gekijōban
1978	Farewell to Space Battleship Yamato	さらば宇宙戦艦ヤマト 愛の戦士たち	Saraba uchu senkan Yamato: Ai no senshitachi
1979	Yamato: The New Voyage	宇宙戦艦ヤマト 新たなる旅立ち	Uchū Senkan Yamato Aratanaru Tabidachi
1979	Triton of the Sea	海のトリトン	Umi no Triton
1980	The Battle of Port Arthur, also known as 203 Kochi	二百三高地	Ni hyaku san kochi
1980	Be Forever Yamato	ヤマトよ永遠に	Yamato yo towa ni
1982	The Great Japanese Empire	大日本帝国	Dainippon teikoku
1982	High Teen Boogie	ハイティーン・ブギ	Hai tiin bugi
1982	Future War 198X	フューチャーウォー198X年	Fyūchā Wō Sen Kyū Hachi Ekkusu-nen
1983	Battle Anthem, also known as The Battle of the Sea of Japan: Go to Sea	日本海大海戦 海ゆかば	Nihonkai daikaisen: Umi yukaba
1983	L・O・V・I・N・G	エル・オー・ヴィ・愛・N・G	Eru-o-ui-ai-N-G
1984	Zero	零戦燃ゆ	Zerosen moyu
1985	Love: Take Off, also known as Love: Starting on a Journey	愛・旅立ち	Ai: Tabidachi
1985	Odin: Photon Sailer Starlight	オーディーン 光子帆船スターライト	Odin - Koshi Hansen Starlight
1986	One-Winged Angel	片翼だけの天使	Katayoku dake no tenshi
1987	Tokyo Blackout	首都消失	Shuto shōshitsu
1987	This Story of Love	この愛の物語	Kono ai no monogatari
1989	Iemitsu, Hikoza and Isshin Tasuke - A National Crisis: Edo Castle in Danger	家光と彦左と一心太助～天下の一大事 危うし江戸城！～	Iemitsu to Hikoza to Isshin Tasuke: Tenka no ichidaiji ayaushi Edo-jō!
1989	Company Executives	社葬	Shaso
1990	The Yagyu Code: Secret Scrolls	柳生武芸帳	Yagyū Bugeichō
1991	Earthshaking Event	動天	Dōten
1991	Sure Death 5	必殺!5 黄金の血	Hissatsu!5 Ōgon no Chi
1991	The Great Shogunate Battle	江戸城大乱	Edo Jō Tairan
1992	Great Conquest: Romance of Three Kingdoms, also known as Sangokushi: The Great Conquest	三国志 第一部 英雄たちの夜明け	Sangokushi Daiichibu Eiyū-tachi no Yoake
1992	The Unruly Ronin’s Journey II	素浪人無頼旅Ⅱ	Moto rōnin burai tabi II
1992	Heavenly Sin	天国の大罪	Tengoku no Taizai
