= Eirin =

Movie regulating organization in Japan

Film Classification and Rating Organization
- 映画倫理機構
- Pronunciation: Eiga Rinri Kikō
- Formation: June 14, 1949; 77 years ago
- Founder: Japanese film industry
- Founded at: Japan
- Type: Self-regulatory
- Legal status: General incorporated foundation
- Headquarters: Chūō, Tokyo, Japan
- Location: Japan
- Region served: Japan
- Owner: Japanese government

The Film Classification and Rating Organization (映画倫理機構, Eiga Rinri Kikō), also known as Eirin (映倫), is Japan's self-regulatory film regulator. Eirin was established on the model of the then-Motion Picture Association of America's Production Code Administration on 14 June 1949, succeeding the US-led occupation authorities' role of film censorship during the Occupation of Japan. It classifies films into one of four categories depending on their suitability for viewing by minors of different ages.

As in other countries, Eirin classifies films to indicate their suitability for minors. It considers eight criteria, such as whether the film contains sexual or violent material, and gives the film a rating in one of four categories. Although the ratings are sometimes controversial, Eirin's defenders argue that its independence shields film makers from the more draconian alternative, government censorship.

During the opening credits (or in some cases, on the copyright screen immediately following the ending credits) of an Eirin-approved film, the Eirin logo is displayed prominently underneath or beside the movie's title. Eirin has no legal power to ban films, but the Japan Association of Theatre Owners forbids its members from screening films that haven't been classified by Eirin.

== History ==
During World War II, the government of Japan censored films. The job of censoring was the responsibility of the Interior Ministry's Police Bureau. In time censorship was subsumed with the motions picture law of 1939.

The Motion Picture Code of Ethics Committee (映画倫理規程管理委員会, Eiga Rinri Kitei Kanri Iinkai) was established on 14 June 1949 and was the predecessor to Eirin. The organization was criticized for hiring examiners who were part of the same movie industry that financed the organization, resulting in a conflict of interest. There was also criticism of the content of some films which came out at the time, such as Nikkatsu's Season of the Sun based on the award-winning book by Shintaro Ishihara.

In response to the criticism, Eirin began to bring in outsiders to join the commission in 1956 and reorganized into a self-financing, independent body. At that time, it also changed its name to Eirin Kanri Iinkai, and is the foundation of today's rating body.

=== Early ratings set ===
On June 14, 1949, The "Motion Picture Code of Ethics" is established, and the "Motion Picture Code of Ethics Administration Committee" (the original Eirin) is launched. On August 1954, the "Film Ethics Code Administration Committee", acting in accordance with the "Film Ethics Code" when it was first established, began classifying films as either Youth Film (青少年向映画, Seishōnen Muki Eiga) or Adult Film (成人向映画, Seijin Kō Eiga). When the film Season of the Sun released on May 17, 1956, after being designated as an Adult Film under the existing system, it sparked controversy across the country, ultimately forcing the dissolution of the "Film Ethics Code Administration Committee". On December of that same year, the "Film Ethics Administration Committee", the precursor to the current Eirin (Film Ethics Organization), was established as a body independent of the film industry, marking a move toward radical reform. Starting in 1957, the ratings were renamed General Rating and Adult Rating.

- General Rating (一般指定, Ippan Shitei): Patrons of all ages are admitted.
- Adult Rating (成人指定, Seijin Shitei): Patrons under 18 years old are prohibited from admission.

=== Introduction of Limited General Film rating ===
After the controversy surrounding the release of the erotic drama film Emmanuelle in 1974, calls for a rating between General and Adult were raised. Later in 1976, the R rating, which means "Limited General Film" was introduced.

- General Rating (一般指定, Ippan Shitei): Patrons of all ages are admitted.
- Limited General Film (一般映画制限付, Ippan Eiga Seigen-tsuki): Patrons under 15 years old and junior high schoolers must be accompanied by a parent or guardian. However, most theaters prohibited admission of patrons under 15 and junior high schoolers, thus in the following year, the rating became fully restrictive. (Note: The first Japanese film to use this rating was Ninkyo Gaiden: Genkai Nada (任侠外伝 玄界灘, Ninkyō Gaiden: Genkai Nada; released May 29, 1976) and the first non-Japanese film to use this rating was Snuff (released June 19, 1976), a movie claiming to show actual scenes of homicide.)
- Adult Rating (成人指定, Seijin Shitei): Patrons under 18 years old are prohibited from admission.

=== Introduction of PG-12 rating ===
A series of non-Japanese horror films depicting violent scenes have led to concerns about their impact on children. And since similar ratings already existed outside of Japan, the PG-12 rating was introduced on May 1998, and the existing ratings were renamed.

- General (一般, Ippan): There is no age rating. Anyone may view it, regardless of age.
- : Some parts of the viewing experience are not suitable for children under the age of 12 (elementary school age or younger). Please have a parent or guardian accompany them whenever possible.
- : This content is not suitable for viewers under the age of 15 (junior high school age or younger) and cannot be viewed by them.
- : This content is not suitable for viewers under the age of 18 and cannot be viewed by them.

=== Ratings requirements change ===
The Eirin Management Committee (Sonroku Ide as president), a third-party organization that pre-screens films shown in theaters, announced on April 23, 2009 that it will revise the notation used to define age-based admission restrictions and other restrictions starting in May. Eirin explained that the change from minus signs to plus signs was made to emphasize the recommendation of viewing based on age, rather than prohibition or restriction. They distributed posters to movie theaters nationwide to raise awareness. And have newly established the "Courtesy of Film Ethics", which proclaims freedom of expression and clearly articulates the screening criteria. The committee also announced that its official name will be changed to "Film Ethics Committee" at May 1st, and that it will publish the review results on its website and expand the scope of its review activities. On May 1, 2009, the ratings were revised and R15+ do not require school level to be admitted anymore.

== Ratings ==
Rating	Description
	Anybody can view The themes or subjects represented in films in this category, and how they are handled are not disturbing or shocking for children of elementary school age or younger. They are carefully restrained so as not to shock them, although brief scenes of sex, violence, drugs, crime etc. are included, they are limited for necessary development of the story, and overall, it is a calm work. Some works in the G category are more adult-oriented, otherwise, in works that are mainly viewed by kindergartners and elementary schoolers, more careful depiction and expression are made.
	Parental or guardian guidance required for under 12 years old The themes or subjects represented in films in this category and the way in which they are handled are stimulating and not suitable for viewing by elementary school students. Although some important content is also included, in general, it is unsuitable for viewing by kindergartners and lower graders of elementary school, and in the case of upper graders, since there are individual differences in the growth process, knowledge and maturity level, Eirin expect advice and guidance from parents or guardians.
	Ages 15 and up (Viewing is prohibited for those under 15 years old) Films in this category are strongly stimulating in their subject matter and depiction of material and not suitable for children under the age of 15 in terms of comprehension and judgment. Contains inappropriate content, therefore, the target audience is 15 years old and over and those under 15 are prohibited from viewing.
	Ages 18 and up (Viewing is prohibited for those under 18 years old) Films in this category are suitable for viewing by those over the age of 18. The subject or material and its treatment are extremely stimulating, for this reason, people under the age of 18 are prohibited from viewing.

=== Not subject to the classification ===
Films whose content exceeds the R18+ standard after review will be classified as "Not Subject to the Classification" (区分の適用外, Kubun no Tekiyō-gai). The review is not completed, a "Classification Designation Certificate" (区分指定書, Kubun Shitei-sho) will not be issued, and the use of Eirin marks is not permitted. The films are treated as not suitable for screening by Eirin, and will be refused screening at movie theaters affiliated with the National Federation of Entertainment and Public Health Industry Associations (全国興行生活衛生同業組合連合会, Zenkoku Kōgyō Seikatsu Eisei Dōgyō Kumiai Rengō-kai).

=== Criteria ===
The eight criteria are the main focus of rating a film, those are themes, language, sex, nudity, violence, horror, drugs and crime.

==== Themes ====
- G: The themes dealing with family and social issues are presented in a way that is accessible, ethically appropriate and sensitive to young audiences.
- PG12: The film deals with realistic issues in adult society that are difficult for young people to understand, but it is carefully expressed.
- R15+: Human desires and serious social issues are depicted realistically and provocatively. In some cases, overlapping depictions of sex, violence, crime, etc., and extremely unethical matters are depicted with discretion.
- R18+: Human desires and unethical feelings and actions are depicted in a realistic and highly provocative manner. When necessary in the context, extremely antisocial and unethical themes such as pleasure murder, incest, cannibalism, and pedophilia are also depicted. As the subject matter or subject matter itself becomes more problematic, it is depicted and expressed in a carefully restrained manner, and the work as a whole does not unnecessarily promote interest in such matters or praise or affirm them.

==== Language ====
- G: Even if there are some criticisms, profanity, slander, or vulgar words, they are considered at the level of commonly used in daily life. Discriminatory, human rights infringing, and sexual language is avoided as much as possible.
- PG12: In the storyline, discriminatory, human rights violating, and sexual terms are sometimes used, but carefully worded. Attention is paid to verbal attacks and threats.
- R15+: Discriminatory and human rights-violating terms, names of genitalia, and words describing their states are sometimes used. However, in such cases, the strength of the language itself, the historical background, and the appropriateness of the depiction are questioned. Insulting or offensive expressions against specific individuals, groups, or facilities are handled with care.
- R18+: Unless required by the context, highly problematic discriminatory language is not used. Sexual terminology is not overused, and the work as a whole does not encourage or endorse discrimination or human rights violations.

==== Sex ====
- G: Lovely and consensual adult sex, even clothed, is depicted naturally, concisely, and gently. Sexual violence is limited to implication only, even when necessary for story development.
- PG12: Brief sexual love is expressed. Depending on the context, there may be depictions of sexual violence, but they are carefully restrained. Sexual depictions in front of young children, sexual terms, and sexual harassment must be expressed with caution.
- R15+: Although sexual expressions using full nudity are seen, sexual positions, sexual conversations, ecstasy, detail, length, and frequency are restrained. Sexual acts involving minors, sexual minorities, and the socially vulnerable are carefully restrained, as well as sexual violence and sexual crimes. Sexual perversions such as SM games, fetishism, and incest are even more carefully restrained.
- R18+: The film contains highly stimulating depictions of sexual acts, such as full-nude shots of the characters in the intercourse position, violent body movements, genital caressing and penetration, oral sex, and ejaculation, which are strongly reminiscent of the original. There is also group sex and the use of sexual instruments and restraints. However, even if necessary according to the context, the following scenes use more restrained expressions:
  (1) Sexual acts and sexual attacks involving minors, sexual minorities, and the vulnerable people.
  (2) Sexual violence, such as rape, group rape, humiliation, sexual torture, and bondage.
  (3) Severe sexual perversions, such as SM, incest, pedophilia, bestiality, and necrophilia.

==== Nudity ====
- G: There is natural and brief nudity, but it is limited to carefully restrained depictions, especially in sexual contexts. Depictions of corpses are carefully expressed so as not to infringe on human dignity.
- PG12: It may depict natural, brief, isolated long shots of pubic nudity, but not full frontal nudity or genitalia. It is more cautious in sexually themed contexts.
- R15+: There are natural, brief depictions of full nudity, and rare long shots of fully nude frontal view. Naturalistic childbirth scenes are depicted with care.
- R18+: Natural nudity is frequent, and sometimes includes brief full-frontal long shots, however, genitals and hair are not shown or emphasized. There is no depiction of genitals, anus, or hair related to sexual acts, sexual violence, torture or abuse, drug taking, sexual crimes, menstruation, urination, excretion, etc., and there is no sexual nudity featuring actors under the age of 18.

==== Violence ====
- G: When fights, conflicts, or acts of vandalism are depicted, violence is not emphasized as a means of solving everyday problems. In scenes of mass violence, such as war, organized crime, historical dramas, and period dramas, the depiction of killing, blood, and corpses is carefully restrained. Dangerous games that can easily be copied by young children are carefully depicted.
- PG12: There is some blood and killing, but the depiction of mutilation, agony, and pain is suppressed. Attacks on the face, head, and heart are also suppressed. Violence against minors, vulnerable people, and animals may not be acceptable depending on the context. Long and detailed scenes are omitted.
- R15+: There are some violent scenes, rather shocking scenes, such as fatal bodily injury accompanied by blood splatter, however, the sense of realism and cruelty is kept to a minimum. Scenes in which the body is directly destroyed by weapons such as guns and swords are not depicted in detail. Depictions of torture, abuse, lynching, execution, indiscriminate mass murder, and sadistic serial murders are handled with restraint.
- R18+: There are depictions of bodily mutilation and destruction accompanied by the scattering of fresh blood, which are realistic, cruel, and extremely stimulating. Contextual necessity is important. The work as a whole lacks a spirit of rejecting violence, and there are no expressions that specifically emphasize violence and cruelty. The following scenes use even more restrained expressions:
  (1) Violence and attacks against minors, the vulnerable people, and animals.
  (2) Cruelty and brutality that lack sympathy for the victims and take pleasure in violence, especially torture, bizarre dissection of bodies and corpses, and organ removal.
  (3) Aggravated depictions of sexual acts, drug use, heinous crimes, discrimination, and prejudice.
  (4) Violence such as pleasure killing, cannibalism, sadism and sexual perversion.

==== Horror ====
- G: The scary scenes are designed to be less disturbing and upsetting for younger audiences. Long, detailed and realistic depictions are avoided, and the ending is reassuring. Caution is also exercised in the treatment of superstition, fortune-telling, spiritualism and hypnotism.
- PG12: The film contains images of horror, including blood and grotesque scenes, but refrains from depicting the pain and agony of the victims. Attacks on monsters and other creatures are depicted, but no lengthy or detailed attacks on humans, especially minors, are shown.
- R15+: When including fictional supernatural beings, human or animal blood splatter, bodily mutilation, or agony, it is depicted in a restrained manner. No cruel attacks on minors are depicted.
- R18+: There is realistic fear involving agony and violence, as well as threats and coercion from attackers, but there are no particularly cruel or inhuman depictions of bloody festivals, satanic rituals, or gruesome murders.

==== Drugs ====
- G: Drug dealing is sometimes depicted in brief dialogue or as a background explanation of the incident, but use of hard drugs, thinner, etc. is not specified. Particular care should be taken in situations involving young children.
- PG12: The use of hard drugs, stimulants, poisons, etc., is kept to a minimum necessary for the storyline. Expressions that may stimulate the interests of minors are avoided.
- R15+: There are descriptions of the euphoria, delusions, and withdrawal symptoms that accompany taking drugs, but they are not long or detailed. Drug names and lethal doses are not described in detail. There are no aggravating depictions of violent crimes or sexual acts.
- R18+: Although the film also includes scenes of violence, crime, and sexual acts that accompany the euphoria, hallucinations, and withdrawal symptoms of drug use, it refrains from depicting sexual violence, sexual perversion, or heinous crimes. The film as a whole does not contain any scenes that encourage, approve, or glorify drug abuse.

==== Crime ====
- G: There are concise descriptions of crimes and incidents that are necessary for the development of the story. However, when it comes to minors and vulnerable people, careful consideration is given to situations in which a person is the victim or perpetrator of a heinous crime. Underage drinking and smoking are avoided, and bullying, delinquency, and bad behavior are not tolerated. Great attention is paid to crimes and incidents that occur in places and situations familiar to young people, such as suicide, self-harm, autopsy, surgery, etc.
- PG12: The film depicts theft, shoplifting, and criminal use of everyday objects like knives, mobile phones, and computers, and hypnosis and brainwashing, but avoids detailed depictions of juvenile delinquency and bad behavior. Murder, abandonment of bodies, and assault and abuse of minors and the vulnerable people are carefully restrained.
- R15+: The film depicts violent crimes such as murder, homicide, arson, and rape, as well as various crimes such as kidnapping, abduction, confinement, molestation, compensated dating, prostitution, and human trafficking, as well as social incidents such as indiscriminate terrorism. However, this is done with careful expression. Depictions of illegal surgery, abortion, and dangerous drug experiments are kept to a minimum.
- R18+: Violent crimes, incidents, and tragic accidents are also depicted in detail, but works that are so realistic that they could be linked to real-life crimes, or that only depict tragic accidents, brutal incidents, torture, executions, etc. are excluded. There is no expression in the work that specifically glorifies or affirms crimes and criminals.

== See also ==
- Computer Entertainment Rating Organization – The Japanese rating system for console games.
- Motion picture rating system
- Direct-to-video
- Nihon Ethics of Video Association
