= Saint Seiya: The Movie =

Saint Seiya: Evil Goddess Eris
- Promotional poster
- Directed by: Kōzō Morishita
- Screenplay by: Yoshiyuki Suga
- Based on: Saint Seiya by Masami Kurumada
- Music by: Seiji Yokoyama
- Production company: Toei Animation
- Distributed by: Toei Company
- Release date: July 18, 1987
- Running time: 45 minutes
- Country: Japan
- Language: Japanese

Saint Seiya (聖闘士星矢(セイントセイヤ), Seinto Seiya), retitled Saint Seiya: Evil Goddess Eris (聖闘士星矢(セイントセイヤ) 邪神エリス, Seinto Seiya: Jashin Erisu) on its home video release, is the first in a series of anime films produced by Toei Animation based on the manga Saint Seiya by Masami Kurumada. The movie premiered on July 18, 1987, at the Toei Manga Matsuri film festival, where it was shown as part of a quadruple feature along with Dragon Ball: Sleeping Princess in Devil's Castle and the movie versions of Hikari Sentai Maskman and Choujinki Metalder.

== Plot ==
The film is independent from the canon and chronology established by Kurumada in his manga. In the movie plot, Seiya already has awakened to the Seven Senses, thus the movie can be situated after the Twelve Temples arc in the chronology.

It starts off with Seiya, Hyōga, and Shun visiting the Miho's Star Children Academy, a school and orphanage owned by The biological father of Seiya and Seika and adoptive grandfather of Saori Kido, Mitsumasa Kido, and former home of Seiya and Seika, where Hyoga saves one of the children of Miho, one of the caretakers of the orphanage from being run over by a car, when the child attempted to retrieve his toy airplane into a busy street.

A new character called Erie Aizawa is revealed to be Miho's workmate and a second caretaker at the orphanage. She starts having feelings for Hyōga, and, one night, they are sitting outside watching the stars when they suddenly see a falling star. As Erie makes a wish, it is stolen by Eris, the Greek Goddess of Discord, who uses it to revive herself.

Things worsen when Eris takes possession of Erie's body and kidnaps the Greek Goddess of War and Wisdon Athena to Eris' own Sanctuary. Eris plans to gain control of the world by sucking all the energy out of Athena with the golden apple to seize her body, and revives dead Saints of the past to fight for her, dubbing them Ghost Saints, and also Ghost Five. They are known as Orion Jager, Sagitta Maya, Southern Cross Kristos, Scutum Jan and Lyra Orpheus.

The protagonists receive the news about the kidnapping and set off towards Eris' Sanctuary. As they enter it, they fight various battles with the Ghost Saints, who end up being killed again. Seiya quickly defeats Maya; Shiryu struggles and kills Jan; Kristos is killed by Eris while trying to finish Hyoga; Orpheus is defeated by Ikki, who save his brother Shun from Orpheus's attack. In the end, after a struggle with the last and most powerful of the "Ghost Five", Orion Jäger, Seiya is helped by the spirit of the deceased Sagittarius Aiolos, who sends the Sagittarius Gold Cloth to his aid.

As Jäger is defeated by Seiya, Eris is the only one left standing between the Earth's salvation and destruction. Seiya takes the Sagittarius bow and aims at the golden apple, but hesitates for fear that the arrow might hit Athena. Athena herself encourages Seiya to shoot the arrow, which he does, to Eris' dismay, releasing Erie from the evil goddess's control.

With the discord goddess returned to the realm of the dead, the Saints escape the crumbling sanctuary, and, along with the released Erie and Saori, walk towards a more peaceful world.

== Production ==
With the success in Japan of Masami Kurumada's Saint Seiya manga and its anime adaptation, Toei made plans for a theatrical feature. Kurumada, the author of Saint Seiya, participated in the production. In three months, he created and designed the five new Saints that appeared in the movie, whose appearances were based on his sketches, as seen in an article published on Weekly Shōnen Jump. Ghost Saint Scutum Jan's constellation name was originally "Shield" but was changed to the Japanese form of the Scutum constellation: Tateza. In Japan, the film was named Saint Seiya: The Movie, but in some countries, it received the name "The Legend of the Golden Apple", or another similar title. The series author, Masami Kurumada, suggested the name of "Jashin Eris" for its DVD release. The five Ghost Saints used to be Silver Saints in life, which was confirmed with a question mark in the pamphlet of the movie Saint Seiya: The Heaven Chapter ~Overture~.

The soundtrack was composed by Seiji Yokoyama and released in the Saint Seiya Original Soundtrack II CD.

In 2011, the movie was adapted into a musical for the Japanese audience, which premiered on May 5, 2011. The musical was released on DVD on November 21, 2011, as well as its soundtrack on October 19, 2011.

== New characters ==
Eris, Goddess of Discord
Erisu (エリス)
Voiced by: Toshiko Fujita
Eris tempted Erie with a golden apple to possess and use her as a tool to bring chaos into this world. After capturing Saori Kido (Athena), she places a golden apple in front of Saori's chest to drain her power and life force to the point where Eris would no longer need Erie's body. She then proceeds with her plan to take over the world. It had been foretold that, if Athena were to die, all of the dead Saints with grief in their hearts would be revived to finish Earth's destruction. (Note: Time: 37:39/Eris: In the oldest prophecies, it is foretold that when Athena dies the Saints lying in their graves will start to move. Many Saints with grief in their hearts are now waiting to be revived the moment Athena dies to complete Earth's destruction.)
Erie Aizawa (Note: movie box)
Aizawa Erie (相沢 絵梨衣)
Voiced by: Mayumi Shō
Erie is a volunteer at the Star Children Academy where Seiya, his sister older Seika, and Seiya's childhood friend Miho grew up. Her wish on a falling star was stolen by Eris. The goddess took control over Erie's body until Eris could be completely revived into this world again. Erie and Hyōga felt a close connection when they first met.

=== Ghost Saints "Ghost Five" ===
Orion Jäger
Orion no Jagā (オリオン星座のジャガー)
Voiced by: Yū Mizushima
Said to be one of the most powerful Silver Saints who served Athena with honor. (Note: Time: 29:01/Seiya: Jäger, you were once one of the strongest Saints, but now...) After he was killed, he held a grudge over being forgotten, and the loneliness that comes with being dead. (Note: Time: 29:10/Jäger: You have absolutely no idea of how it feels to be left alone in eternal darkness.) He did not hesitate to accept Eris' offer and was soon revived with a new body to fight for the destruction of the world. (Note: Time: 26:50/Ikki:You mean that your bones were revived from your grave?/Orpheus: No, not our bones. Eris called us back and gave us new bodies.) As he faced Phoenix Ikki, he found his foe's strength to be almost equal to his own. When Ikki explained the meaning of the friendship that the present Saints had, Jäger hesitated, but still continued to fight Ikki. Jäger was interrupted when Pegasus Seiya obtained the Sagittarius Gold Cloth, and, after having his strongest attack blocked by Seiya, was defeated. With his last words, he acknowledged Seiya and the others as true Saints. (Note: Time: 39:25/Jäger: Admirable Seiya, you guys really are true Saints as well...)
Sagitta Maya
Sajitta no Maya (矢座(サジッタ)の魔矢)
Voiced by: Michitaka Kobayashi
Another Saint revived by Eris into a new body. His personality is similar to Pegasus Seiya's, but Maya would fight to the death if it meant winning. He proves this when he faces Seiya, to first talk, and then attack with all his strength. He is no match for Seiya, but one of the arrows from his Hunting Arrow Express attack makes it through Seiya's defenses. Seiya removes the arrow with ease and tries to get Maya to tell him where Saori is, but leaves when Maya does not respond. Maya says in his last breath that the arrow is actually poisonous, and only one shot is enough to remove the five senses.
Southern Cross Khristós
Sazan Kurosu no Kuraisuto (南十字星座(サザンクロス)のクライスト)
Voiced by: Ryuusei Nakao
Khristós died some time before Athena was kidnapped. Hyōga recognizes him as the Southern Cross Saint, as he himself is one of the Northern Cross. (Note: Time: 18:20/Hyoga: Impossible, Khristós was.../Khristós We are Ghost Saints revived by Eris.) Feeling restless and tormented by his death as he lay in his grave, Khristós put aside his Saint title and joined Eris, who revived him with a new body. When he gets an advantage over Cygnus Hyōga, Khristós is betrayed by Eris, who sees this as a good opportunity. She throws a spear into Khristós's back, which pierces through his heart, killing him and injuring Hyōga at the same time.
Scutum Jan
Sukyūtamu no Yan (楯座(スキュータム)のヤン)
Voiced by: Keiichi Nanba
Jan is a Saint that apparently died in vain; this may well have been caused by his straightforward and jump-into-action personality. As he was restless in his grave, he gladly accepted Eris' offer, and was soon revived and given a new body. He faced off against Dragon Shiryū. As the Scutum Cloth has a stronger shield than the Dragon Cloth, he seemingly defeated Shiryū within one minute, but, underestimating the Dragon Saint's power, he was soon defeated as Shiryū unleashed all of his Cosmo into a single attack.
Lyra Orpheus
Raira no Orufeusu (琴座(ライラ)のオルフェウス)
Voiced by: Yūji Mitsuya
The legendary mythical person himself, as expressed by Andromeda Shun. (Note: Time: 24:18/Shun: Indeed that Cloth belongs to the legendary Saint from the old poems.) After his failure to bring Eurydice back, he died with regrets. This led to him gladly taking Eris' offer and being revived in a new body. As he faced Shun, Orpheus seemed to be a calm and subtle person, but as the fight progressed, he showed his darker side. After ensnaring and almost killing Shun with his Stringer Requiem attack, Orpheus was cut short by Phoenix Ikki's arrival. Ikki attacked with his Hō'ō Genmaken, but since Orpheus had already suffered through hell, he brushed the attack off easily. Wasting no time, Orpheus attacked with his Stringer Requiem again, but this time Ikki unleashed his Hōyoku Tenshō attack and Orpheus was killed.

== Home video ==
A DVD version was released in 2013 and a Blu-ray was released in 2021.

== See also ==
- List of Saint Seiya films
- Saintia Shō
