= Shōhei Hino =

Japanese actor and singer (1949–2024)

- Born: Kōichi Nihei; May 30, 1949; Tokyo, Japan
- Died: November 14, 2024 (aged 75); Tokyo, Japan
- Occupation: Actor
- Years active: 1960–2024

Kōichi Nihei (二瓶 康一, Nihei Kōichi; May 30, 1949 – November 14, 2024), known professionally as Shōhei Hino (火野 正平, Hino Shōhei), was a Japanese actor and singer who appeared in jidaigeki television dramas. He is best known for his roles in the Hissatsu series.

== Life and career ==
Hino was born in Tokyo and raised in Osaka.

Hino began his acting career at the age of 13. He made his film debut with Izukoe (1966). In 1973, he was given the stage name Shōhei Hino by novelist Shōtarō Ikenami. In the same year, he won popularity through his role Hashiba Hideyoshi in Kunitori Monogatari. In 1974, Hino made film appearance for the first time in eight years and played lead role for the first time in My Blood is the Blood of Others directed by Toshio Masuda. He was one of the candidates for the role of main character Genji in Shohei Imamura's film Eijanaika, but he had a smaller role. As a singer Hino debuted in 1977 with the single "Sonomamani".

In 2011, Hino hosted a travel program Nippon Judan Kokorotabi on NHK-BS which he travelled around Japan by bicycle.

In 2012, Hino played General Hideki Tojo in the film Emperor. He starred in Hayao Miyazaki's anime film The Boy and the Heron.

He died on November 14, 2024.

== Selected filmography ==
=== Films ===
Year	Title	Role	Director	Notes	Ref
1966	Izukoe	Kinsuke	Kozo Saeki		
1974	My Blood is the Blood of Others	Ryosuke Kinugawa	Toshio Masuda	Lead role	
1979	Sanada Yukimura no Bōryaku	Anayama Kosuke	Sadao Nakajima		
1979	Vengeance Is Mine	Jun'ichirō Yoshitake	Shōhei Imamura		
1980	Shogun's Ninja	Gosuke	Norifumi Suzuki		
1981	Eijanaika	Magohichi	Shōhei Imamura		
1982	The Gate of Youth: Part 2	Takuji	Koreyoshi Kurahara		
1986	Gonza the Spearman	Hannojo	Masahiro Shinoda		
1994	Crest of Betrayal	Kampei	Kinji Fukasaku		
1999	Hissatsu! Shamisenya no Yuji	Karasuma no Kengyō	Shigeru Ishihara	Hissatsu series	
1999	Owls' Castle	Kuroami	Masahiro Shinoda		
2002	Aiki	Tokoname	Daisuke Tengan		
2012	Emperor	Hideki Tojo	Peter Webber	American-Japanese film	
2014	The Light Shines Only There	Matsumoto	Mipo O		
2014	Last Love: My One and Only	Iwata	Hitoshi Ishikawa	Lead role	
2017	Alley Cat	Yasuo Hashiba	Hideo Sakaki		
2017	Legend of the Demon Cat	Kūkai's Teacher	Chen Kaige	Chinese film	
2022	Life in the Fast Lane	Kaitō	Taichi Suzuki		
2022	The Zen Diary	Carpenter	Yuji Nakae		
2023	As Long as We Both Shall Live	Yoshirō Tsurugi	Ayuko Tsukahara		
2023	The Boy and the Heron	Great Uncle (voice)	Hayao Miyazaki		
2024	Samurai Detective Onihei: Blood for Blood	Hikojū	Tomohiko Yamashita		
2024	Last Mile	Akira Sano	Ayuko Tsukahara		

=== Television ===
Year	Title	Role	Notes	Ref
1972	Taiyō ni Hoero!	Kiyoshi	Episode 5	
1972	Nantatte 18 sai!	Hiroshi	Episodes 37 and 39	
1973	Kunitori Monogatari	Hashiba Hideyoshi	Taiga drama	
1975	Nagasaki Hankachō	Sanji		
1975–1976	Tsūkai! Kōchiyama Sōshun	Ushimatsu		
1977	Shin Hissatsu Shiokinin	Shōhachi	Hissatsu series	
1979	Kusa Moeru	Adachi Kagemori	Taiga drama	
1979–1980	The Unfettered Shogun	Suzuhei (ep. 85), Munakata (ep. 123)		
1980	Shadow Warriors	Daihachi		
1982–1983	Nemuri Kyōshirō: Engetsu Sappō	Kinpachi		
1983–1991	Choshichiro Edo Nikki	Tatsusaburō		
1991	Takeda Shingen	Yamamoto Kansuke	TV movie	
1998–2001	Gokenin Zankurō	Kumezō (S3, ep. 10), Shinjurō (S5, ep. 1)		
2005	Ōoku	Ryūkō	Season 3	
2006	Imo Tako Nankin	Shōichi Tokunaga	Asadora	
2011	AIBOU: Tokyo Detective Duo	Eda	Season 9, episode 15	
2018	Anone	Manpei Hanabusa		
2021	Bullets, Bones and Blocked Noses	Ichirō Aoba	Mini-series	

== Discography ==
=== Singles ===
- Sonomamani (1977)
- Tazunetemo Iikai (1978)
- Hitori (1978)
- Ore (1980)
- Fanny (1982)
- Kitakaze no Naka (1982)
- Akai Ito (1983)
- Yume no Tsuzuki (1983)
- Damatte Oreni Tsuitekoi (1986)
- Gomenne (1991)
- Omoideniserete tamaruka (1991)
- Kotoshi no Bara (2009)
- Akantare (2023)

=== Albums ===
- Fuyuyo Koi (1977)
- Yume Gokochi (1978)
- Doryuzu (1981)
- Furimuite (1983)
- Shikōro (1983)
- Gomenne (1991)
- Womantachi eno Komoriuta (2009)
