= Saint Seiya Original Soundtrack I–VIII =

Album by Seiji Yokoyama

Saint Seiya OST I

Soundtrack album by Seiji Yokoyama and The Andromeda Armonique Orchestra
- Released: January 21, 1987
- Genre: Music score
- Length: 44:05

Saint Seiya OST II

Soundtrack album by Seiji Yokoyama and The Andromeda Armonique Orchestra
- Released: August 1, 1987
- Genre: Music score
- Length: 53:55

Saint Seiya OST III

Soundtrack album by Seiji Yokoyama and The Andromeda Armonique Orchestra
- Released: December 21, 1987
- Genre: Music score
- Length: 45:19

Saint Seiya OST IV

Soundtrack album by Seiji Yokoyama and The Andromeda Armonique Orchestra
- Released: April 1, 1988
- Genre: Music score
- Length: 41:32

Saint Seiya OST V

Soundtrack album by Seiji Yokoyama and The Andromeda Armonique Orchestra
- Released: August 21, 1988
- Genre: Music score
- Length: 42:49

Saint Seiya OST VI

Soundtrack album by Seiji Yokoyama and The Andromeda Armonique Orchestra
- Released: October 1, 1988
- Genre: Music score
- Length: 44:42

Saint Seiya OST VII

Soundtrack album by Seiji Yokoyama and The Andromeda Armonique Orchestra
- Released: December 21, 1988
- Genre: Music score
- Length: 39:20

Saint Seiya OST VIII

Soundtrack album by Seiji Yokoyama and The Andromeda Armonique Orchestra
- Released: April 8, 1989
- Genre: Music score
- Length: 45:02

The Saint Seiya Original Soundtrack I–VIII are eight CDs, released independently, containing the original soundtrack (OST) of the Saint Seiya anime. In addition to the music from the anime, these CDs also include the OSTs from four of the Saint Seiya movies: Evil Goddess Eris, The Heated Battle of the Gods, Legend of Crimson Youth and Warriors of the Final Holy Battle. The music was composed by Seiji Yokoyama and interpreted by the Andromeda Armonique Orchestra. The female voice acting in all of the albums was Kazuko Kawashima (川島和子).

It was one of the first soundtracks to be released not with traditional J-Pop songs, but as background music.

== Saint Seiya OST I ==
The first OST contains background music from the first part of the anime (Sanctuary saga). It was released on January 21, 1987, by Nippon Columbia.

Track list
No.	Title	Length
1.	"Pegasus Meteor Fist (ペガサス流星拳, Pegasus Ryū Sei Ken)"	4:45
2.	"Sanctuary, Melody Of Death (聖域、死の戒律, Sankuchuari, shi no kairitsu)"	3:25
3.	"Galactic Wars (銀河戦争, Ginga Sensō – Galaxian Wars)"	3:54
4.	"Burning Cosmo (燃える小宇宙, Moeru Kosumo)"	4:10
5.	"Promise In A Protection Star (守護星に誓う, Shugosei ni chikau)"	5:47
6.	"Goddess's Saints (Athena's Saints) (女神の聖闘士, Atena no seinto)"	4:31
7.	"Phoenix The Demon Of Vengeance (復讐鬼フェニックス, Fukushūki Fenikkusu)"	4:27
8.	"Black Saints' Challenge (暗黒聖闘士の挑戦, Ankoku seinto no chōsen)"	4:00
9.	"Sad Brothers (哀しき兄弟たち, Kanashiki Kyodaitachi)"	4:39
10.	"Age Of Legends (伝説の時代へ, Densetsu no jidai e)"	4:57

== Saint Seiya OST II ==
The second OST contains background music from the first part of the anime (Sanctuary), as well as the soundtrack of the first movie, Evil Goddess Eris. It was released on August 1, 1987, by Nippon Columbia.

Track list
No.	Title	Length
1.	"Evil Goddess Eris (邪悪神エリス, Jākushin Eris)"	04:19
2.	"Inside A Dream (夢の中に, Yume no naka ni)"	02:01
3.	"Warrior Of Sagittarius (射手座の戦士, Sajitariasu no senshi)"	00:44
4.	"Gather! Under Athena (集え!女神のもとに, Atsume! Atena no moto ni)"	02:02
5.	"Glide! Pegasus (翔べ!ペガサス, Tobe! Pegasasu)"	04:31
6.	"Pope Ares (教皇アーレス, Kyōkō Āres)"	01:29
7.	"Aria Of The Three (三つのアリア, Mitsu no aria)"	06:27
8.	"Another field (アナザーフィールド, Anazā fīrudo)"	05:39
9.	"Guidance Of The Guardian Constellation (守護星座の導き, Shugoseiza no michibiki)"	01:15
10.	"Athena's Theme (アテナのテーマ, Atena no tēma)"	01:26
11.	"Dilemma – Creeping Shadow (焦躁～忍びよる影, Shōsō ~ shinobi yoru kage)"	01:22
12.	"The Night Before The Final Battle (決戦前夜, Kessen zenya)"	01:50
13.	"Splendid Gold Saints (華麗なる黄金聖闘士, Karei naru Ōgon Seinto)"	04:20
14.	"Seven Senses (セブン・センシズ, Seben senshizu)"	05:47
15.	"Ikki's Theme (一輝のテーマ, Ikki no tēma)"	02:20
16.	"New Battles (新たな戦雲, Aratana sen'un)"	01:03
17.	"Swarm Of Assassins (刺客の群れ, Shikaku no mure)"	01:05
18.	"Fight! Sanctuary (激突!サンクチュアリ, Gekitotsu! Sankuchuari)"	01:17
19.	"Tranquility (やすらぎ, Yasuragi)"	01:50
20.	"Cosmo Of Friendship (友情のコスモ, Yūjō no Kosumo)"	05:14

== Saint Seiya OST III ==
The third OST contains more background music from the first part of the anime (Sanctuary), as well as the opening and ending themes "Pegasus Fantasy" and "Forever Blue". It was released on December 21, 1987, by Nippon Columbia.

Track list
No.	Title	Length
1.	"Pegasus Fantasy (TV size) (ペガサス幻想(TVサイズ), Pegasasu Fantajī (TV saizu))"	01:26
2.	"Intense Cosmo (激突する小宇宙, Gekitotsu suru Kosumo)"	01:55
3.	"Blue Forever (instrumental) (永遠ブルー(インストルメンタル), Eien Burū (insutorumentaru))"	01:35
4.	"Athena's Love (アテナの愛, Atena no Ai)"	02:24
5.	"Warrior's Rest (戦士の休息, Senshi no yasuiki)"	04:32
6.	"Flight Of The Phoenix – Phoenix's Flapping Wings (鳳翼天翔～不死鳥のはばたき, Hō Yoku Ten Shō ~ Fushichō no habataki)"	03:03
7.	"Sanctuary Of Fear (戦慄のサンクチュアリ, Senrishi no Sankuchuari)"	02:33
8.	"Cygnus – Warrior Of Ice (キグナス～氷原の戦士, Kygunasu ~ Hyōgen no senshi)"	02:23
9.	"Beyond The Fierce Battle (烈闘の彼方へ, Rettō no karegata e)"	01:59
10.	"Saints Of Hope (Pegasus Fantasy-Eternal Blue) (希望の聖闘士～ペガサス幻想/永遠ブルー, Kibō no Seinto)"	03:32
11.	"Faraway Five Old Peaks (はるかなる五老峰, Haruka naru gorōhō)"	03:26
12.	"Remember – Sadness (追憶～哀しみ, Okushī ~ Ashimi)"	02:51
13.	"Ares's Shadow (アーレスの影, Āres no kage)"	03:25
14.	"Enter! Fortress Of Evil (突入!邪悪の砦, Totsuniyū! Jaaku no toride)"	01:51
15.	"Pegasus Fantasy (Instrumental) (ペガサス幻想(インストルメンタル), Pegasasu Fantajī (insutorumentaru))"	02:30
16.	"Release The Meteor Fist (流星拳を撃て～ペガサス幻想/永遠ブルー, Ryūseiken o gekite)"	04:44
17.	"Blue Forever (TV Size) (永遠ブルー(TVサイズ), Eien Burū (TV saizu))"	01:10

== Saint Seiya OST IV ==
The fourth CD contains the soundtrack from the second Saint Seiya movie, The Heated Battle of the Gods. It was released by Nippon Columbia on April 1, 1988, with the subtitle The Heated Battle of the Gods (神々の熱き戦い, Kamigami no atsuki tatakai).

Track list
No.	Title	Length
1.	"Prologue: Legend of the North (序章:北欧の神話, Joshō: Hokuō no Shinwa)"	01:55
2.	"Brothers and Sisters of Asgard (アスガルドの兄妹, Asugarudo no keimai)"	04:25
3.	"Odin, Clan of the Evil God (オーディーン,邪悪なる神族, Odin, jāku naru shinzoku)"	01:10
4.	"Severed Friendship (断ち切られた友情, Tachikirareta Yūjō)"	02:20
5.	"Mjolnir's Hammer (ミニョルの鉄槌, Minyoru no tettsui)"	02:06
6.	"Save the Goddess! (女神を救え!, Megami o sukue!)"	01:19
7.	"God Warriors vs. Saints (神闘士 対 聖闘士, Goddo Uōriā tai Seinto)"	05:13
8.	"Gold Cloth, Descent! (黄金聖衣,降臨!, Gold Cloth, kōrin!)"	01:25
9.	"Frey – Hero of Love and Justice (フレイ～愛と正義の勇者, Frey ~ Ai to seigi no yūsha)"	01:44
10.	"Twilight of the Gods – Ragnarok (神々の黄昏 – ラグナロック, Kamigami no tasogare – Ragunarokku)"	01:13
11.	"Epilogue: Under the World Tree (終章:世界樹の木の下で, Shūshō: Sekai-ju no ki no shitade)"	03:28
12.	"Illusions of the 12 Temples ((未収録編) 12宮の幻影, (Mishū Rokuhen) Nijūkyū no genei)"	04:37
13.	"Andromeda Shun, That Fight ((未収録編)アンドロメダ瞬、その戦い, (Mishū Rokuhen) Andoromeda Shun, sono tatakai)"	03:01
14.	"Escape From the Devil Castle ((未収録編)魔城からの脱出, (Mishū Rokuhen) Maki-kara no datsude)"	04:01
15.	"And the Age of the Holy War... ((未収録編)そして聖戦の時代が..., (Mishū Rokuhen) Soshite seisen no jidai ga...)"	03:35

== Saint Seiya OST V ==
The fifth CD contains the soundtrack from the third Saint Seiya movie, Legend of Crimson Youth. It was released by Nippon Columbia on August 21, 1988, with the subtitle Legend of Crimson Youth (真紅の少年伝説, Shinku no shōnen densetsu).

Track list
No.	Title	Length
1.	"Prologue (プロローグ, Purorōgu)"	03:17
2.	"Abel's Theme (アベルのテーマ, Aberu no tēma)"	01:56
3.	"Saori's Decision (沙織の決意, Saori no ketsui)"	02:15
4.	"Athena's Death (女神の死, Atena no shi)"	03:18
5.	"Challenging The Gods (神々への挑戦, Kamigami e no chōsen)"	01:18
6.	"Burning Saints (灼熱の聖闘士, Shakunetsu no Seinto)"	02:33
7.	"The Underworld (冥界, Meikai)"	03:46
8.	"Phoenix Phantom Fist (フェニックス幻魔拳, Fenikkusu Genmaken)"	01:50
9.	"Gemini's Betrayal (ジェミニの反逆, Jemini no hankō)"	02:15
10.	"Indomitable Spirit (不屈の闘志, Fukutsu no tōshi)"	03:11
11.	"Deucalion's Great Flood (デュカリオンの大洪水, Dyukarion no dai-kōzui)"	04:05
12.	"Confrontation (対決, Taiketsu)"	01:08
13.	"Athena Reborn (アテナ転生, Atena tensei)"	04:00
14.	"Corona Temple's Collapse (太陽神殿の崩壊, Taiyō shinden no hōkai)"	05:22
15.	"You Are My Reason To Be (Movie Version) (YOU ARE MY REASON TO BE～愛は瞳の中に～<映画バージョン>, YOU ARE MY REASON TO BE ~ Ai wa hitomi no naka (eiga bājon))"	02:35

== Saint Seiya OST VI ==
The sixth CD contains the soundtrack from the second part of the anime (Asgard saga), as well as instrumental versions of the opening and ending themes "Soldier Dream" and "Blue Dream". It was released by Nippon Columbia on October 1, 1988, with the subtitle Golden Ring Chapter (黄金の指輪篇, Ōgon no yubiwa hen).

Track list
No.	Title	Length
1.	"Hilda of Polaris (北極星のヒルダ, Hokkyokusei no Hiruda)"	05:16
2.	"Nibelung Ring (ニーベルンゲン・リング, Nīberungen Ringu)"	05:19
3.	"A New War Arises (新たなる戦雲, Shintanaru sengumo)"	03:14
4.	"Legendary God Warriors (伝説の神闘士(ゴッドウォーリア), Densetsu no Goddo Uōriā)"	04:14
5.	"Tears of the Sad Heroes (哀しき勇者たちの涙, Kanashiki yūshatachi no namida)"	04:24
6.	"Valhalla Palace (ワルハラ宮殿をめざせ, Waruhara kyūden o mezase)"	01:05
7.	"The Cursed Goddess (呪われた女神, Jūwareta megami)"	04:11
8.	"For this Beloved Earth (愛する大地のために, Ai suru daichi no tameni)"	05:39
9.	"Saint Legend – Soldier Dream (instrumental) (聖闘士神話(ソルジャードリーム)(インストルメンタル), Sorujā Dorīmu (insutorumentaru))"	03:31
10.	"Find the Balmung Sword (バルムングの剣を求めて, Barumungu no ken o motomete)"	04:07
11.	"Blue Dream (instrumental version) (夢旅人(インストルメンタル), Yume tabibito – Blue Dream (insutorumentaru))"	03:42

== Saint Seiya OST VII ==
The seventh CD contains the soundtrack from the third part of the anime, the Poseidon saga. It was released by Nippon Columbia on December 21, 1988, with the subtitle Poseidon Chapter (ポセイドン篇, Poseidon hen).

Track list
No.	Title	Length
1.	"Undersea Temple (海底神殿, Kaitei shinden)"	04:18
2.	"The Call of the Mermaid (人魚の呼び声, Jinsakana no yobikoe)"	04:35
3.	"Another Holy War (聖戦、再び, Seisen, futatabi)"	03:53
4.	"Shine! Bronze Cloths! (輝け！青銅聖衣, Kigayake! Buronzu kurosu)"	02:51
5.	"Siren Sorrento (海魔女ソレント, Umi-majo Sorento)"	03:58
6.	"Arrival of the King of Seas (海皇降臨, Kaiō kōrin)"	02:26
7.	"Dead End Symphony (デッドエンド・シンフォニー, Deddoendo Shinfonī)"	03:30
8.	"The Seven Sea Generals (七大海将軍（ジェネラル）, Shichi daikai Jeneraru)"	03:27
9.	"Time of Destruction (破滅のとき, Hakametsu no toki)"	03:12
10.	"The Legend of Poseidon (ポセイドン伝説, Poseidon densetsu)"	04:10
11.	"Athena's Rebirth (アテナ転生, Atena tensei)"	03:00

== Saint Seiya OST VIII ==
The eighth CD contains the soundtrack from the fourth Saint Seiya movie, Warriors of the Final Holy Battle. It was released by Nippon Columbia on April 8, 1989, with the subtitle Warriors of the Final Holy Battle (最終聖戦の戦士たち, Saishūseisen no senshitachi).

Track list
No.	Title	Length
1.	"Prologue: Dawn (序章；黎明, Joshō: Reimei)"	01:06
2.	"Child of Dawn, Lucifer (暁の子ルシファー, Gyō no ko Lucifeā)"	03:34
3.	"Devil Temple (伏魔神殿, Fukuma Shinden)"	04:40
4.	"Sacred Sacrifice (聖なる生贄, Seinaru seishi)"	01:48
5.	"Fallen Angels vs. Saints (堕天使対聖闘士, Seimatenshi tai Seinto)"	03:01
6.	"Bell of Angelus Prayer (アンジェラスの祈りの鐘, Anjerasu no inori no kane)"	03:44
7.	"Golden Mantis (黄金の蟷螂, Ōgon no tōrō)"	01:57
8.	"Last Holy War (最終聖戦, Saishū seisen)"	02:44
9.	"Arrow of Sun (太陽の矢, Taiyō no ya)"	05:30
10.	"Epilogue: Hymn of Light (終章:光の賛歌, Shūshō: Hikari no sanka)"	04:48
11.	"Fantasy Maze (幻想迷路, Gensō meiro)"	01:34
12.	"Warriors of the Constellations (星座の戦士たち, Seiza no senshitachi)"	03:29
13.	"Decision of Destiny (運命の選択, Unmei no sentaku)"	03:40
14.	"Saints of Hope, Forever (希望の聖闘士よ永遠に, Kibō no Seinto yo eien ni)"	03:27
