= Masao Shimizu =

Japanese actor (1908–1975)

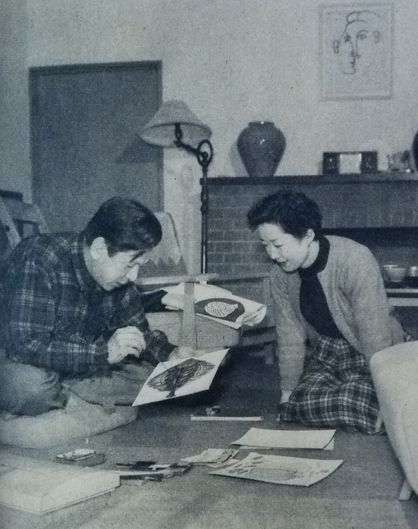
- Masao Shimizu and Yumi Takano in 1955
- Born: 5 October 1908; Tokyo, Japan
- Died: 5 October 1975 (aged 67)
- Occupation: Actor
- Years active: 1931-1971

Masao Shimizu (清水将夫, Shimizu Masao; 5 October 1908 – 5 October 1975) was a Japanese actor. His wife was actress Yumi Takano. His first starring role in the film was in Momoiro no Yuwaku in 1931. In 1947, he formed the Mingei Theatre Company. Shimizu often worked with Akira Kurosawa. He appeared in more than 250 films between 1931 and 1976.

== Selected filmography ==
- The 47 Ronin (1941)
- No Regrets for Our Youth (1946) as Professor Hakozaki
- A Ball at the Anjo House (1947)
- One Wonderful Sunday (1947) as the Dance Hall Manager
- Drunken Angel (1948) as Boss
- Stray Dog (1949)
- Bōryoku no Machi (1950)
- Scandal (1950) as Judge
- Story of a Beloved Wife (1951)
- The Life of Oharu (1952)
- Children of Hiroshima (1952)
- The Life of Oharu (1952) as kikuoji
- Ikiru (1952) as Doctor
- Epitome (1953)
- Gate of Hell (1953)
- Sansho the Bailiff (1954) as Masauji Taira
- I Live in Fear (1955) as Yamazaki, Yoshi's husband
- Season of the Sun (1956)
- Black River (1957)
- Rusty Knife (1958) as Shingo Mano
- The Loyal 47 Ronin (1958)
- Sanjuro (1962) as Kikui
- High and Low (1963) as prison director
- Kojiki taishō (1964) as Tokugawa Ieyasu
- Red Handkerchief (1964)
- Shiroi Kyotō (1966) as Masanori Kōno
- The Snow Woman (1968)
- The Sands of Kurobe (1968) as Tayama
- Savage Wolf Pack (1969) as Yamamuro
- Samurai Banners (1969) as Yokota Takatoshi
- Battle of the Japan Sea (1969)
- The Wild Sea (1969)
- Fuji sanchō (1970)
- The Militarists (1970), Saburō Kurusu
- Tora-san's Dream-Come-True (1972) as Yunaka
- Oreno Eranda Onna (1976) as Washio

=== Television ===
- Ako Roshi (1964) as Sengoku Hokinokami
- Minamoto no Yoshitsune (1966) as Fujiwara no Motonari
- Haru no Sakamichi (1972) as Asano Nagamasa
- Karei-naru Ichizoku (1975) as Miyamoto
