= Toshio Masuda (director) =

Japanese film director (1927–2026)

- Born: October 5, 1927; Kobe, Hyōgo Prefecture, Empire of Japan
- Died: August 26, 2026 (aged 98)
- Occupations: Film director; screenwriter; cinematographer
- Years active: 1958–2026

Japanese name
- Kanji: 舛田 利雄
- Hiragana: ますだ としお
- Katakana: マスダ トシオ
Transcriptions
- Romanization: Masuda Toshio

Toshio Masuda (舛田 利雄, Masuda Toshio; October 5, 1927 – August 26, 2026) was a Japanese film director, screenwriter and cinematographer. He developed a reputation as a consistent box office hit-maker. Over the course of five decades, 16 of his films made the yearly top ten lists at the Japanese box office—a second place record in the industry. Between 1958 and 1968 he directed 52 films for the Nikkatsu Company. Masuda was their top director of action films and worked with the company's top stars, including Yujiro Ishihara with whom he made 25 films.

After the breakdown of the studio system, he moved on to a succession of big-budget movies including the American-Japanese co-production Tora! Tora! Tora! (1970) and the disaster epic Prophecies of Nostradamus (1974). He worked on such anime productions as the Space Battleship Yamato series. His corporate drama Company Funeral (1989) earned him a Japanese Academy Award nomination and wins at the Blue Ribbon Awards and Mainichi Film Awards.

In Japan, his films are well-remembered by fans and called genre landmarks by critics. He remains little known abroad save for rare exceptions of his post-Nikkatsu work such as Tora! Tora! Tora!. However, a number of his films were screened in a 2005 Nikkatsu Action Cinema retrospective in Italy, and a few have since made their way to the United States. In 2009, he helped produce Space Battleship Yamato: Resurrection.

== Early life and education ==
Toshio Masuda was born in Kobe, Japan, on 5 October 1927. His father was a seaman. He enrolled in a technical training school, however, his mindset did not mesh with the school's military indoctrination, and he was expelled in July 1945. He next attended the Osaka University of Foreign Studies (now Osaka University) where he specialized in Russian literature. There he became enamoured with French cinema, which led him away from Russian grammar and toward a career in the film industry. He thought he would have been bored as a salaryman and that filmmaking would better suit him but suggested he probably would not have followed through had his friends not sought similar careers. After graduating in 1949, he moved to Tokyo to study screenwriting at the Shintoho Studio's Scenario Academy.

== Career ==
In 1950, the Shintoho Company hired Toshio Masuda. He worked as screenwriter and an assistant director under Umetsugu Inoue, Nobuo Nakagawa and Mikio Naruse. He served as 2nd assistant director on Naruse's Ginza Cosmetics (1951) and Mother (1952). Inoue became a mentor figure to Masuda. They began collaborating on scripts and Masuda moved in with Inoue. He also wrote rough drafts for a number of Inoue's scripts.

=== Nikkatsu ===
The Nikkatsu Company, having ceased film production during World War II, restarted in 1954 and lured assistant directors from other companies. Masuda joined the studio as an assistant director and writer. He continued to write scripts for and with his mentor Inoue, who had also made the switch. He served as 1st assistant director to Kon Ichikawa on the sets of The Heart (1955) and The Burmese Harp (1956). Masuda was promoted to director in 1957 and debuted with A Journey of Body and Soul the following year. It was a B movie, a low-budget film meant to fill out a double feature, but he quickly ascended to the A list that same year.

Rusty Knife (1958) marked Masuda's third film and first major hit. It starred Nikkatsu's top Diamond Line stars Yujiro Ishihara and Akira Kobayashi. They play two hoodlum brothers who attempt to go straight but witness a murder and find themselves pursued by the killers. The script was written by Ishihara's older brother, and future governor of Tokyo, Shintarō Ishihara. Yujiro Ishihara was by far the studio's biggest star and Nikkatsu frequently paired their young stars with young directors in order to make "new types of films". Masuda, who turned 30 during the production, made a total of 25 films with Ishihara, more than any other director at the studio. Rusty Knife also marked the first in a succession of hits for Masuda which would serve to keep him in the action genre throughout the next decade. Masuda and Ishihara's follow-up, Red Quay (1958), was based on the 1937 French film Pépé le Moko. In 1962, the duo's Hana and Ryu was the studio's number one hit. It was also Masuda's first jidaigeki (period drama) and predated the popularity of the ninkyo (honour versus duty) subgenre which began in 1963 and continued late into the decade. However, Masuda's biggest hit was Red Handkerchief in which Ishihara stars as a disgraced police detective–cum–construction worker who shoots and kills his girlfriend's father. It was the third-highest grossing domestic film of 1964 and a blueprint to the mood action subgenre, action–romantic drama hybrids in a film noir–like setting which were popular in the mid-1960s. He also worked frequently with Kobayashi and Rusty Knife was credited with making the actor a star.

By the late 1960s, Ishihara had scaled back his Nikkatsu output in favour of other studios and his own production company. Nikkatsu viewed new Diamond Line star Tetsuya Watari as a potential successor and they had Masuda remake a number of Ishihara films with him. Masuda loosely remade his own Red Quay into Velvet Hustler (1967) which stars Watari as a "happy-go-lucky" hitman who goes on the run after killing a yakuza boss. The character partially was based on Jean-Paul Belmondo's character in the French New Wave film Breathless (1960). The vigor and humour of the film was something of a departure for both men. The two returned to regular modus operandi in Gangster VIP (1968), which was based on the memoirs of real-life yakuza Goro Fujita. It was the first in what has been called Watari's signature film series and his breakthrough role. Masuda only directed the first film in the series but it provided another blueprint, this time to the studio's New Action subgenre, films which increased the sex and violence quotient while mirroring the tumultuous times of the late 1960s/early 1970s. Nikkatsu's box office returns suffered in the late 1960s and many stars and directors left the studio. Masuda was not happy with the studio system at the time, and in 1968, he quit to become a freelance director—only a few years before Nikkatsu ceased making action films and began producing softcore Roman Porno films in order to remain profitable.

=== Freelance work ===
Remaining a sought after talent, Masuda was approached by the Twentieth Century-Fox Corporation to co-direct the blockbuster American-Japanese co-production Tora! Tora! Tora! (1970) after renowned director Akira Kurosawa left the project. Fox producer Elmo Williams had recommended him based on his Red Handkerchief and reputation as a "creative mind and a disciplined worker". The film depicts the attack on Pearl Harbor from the perspectives of both sides of the conflict. Masuda was responsible for the Japanese segments and asked director Kinji Fukasaku to join him, while American director Richard Fleischer filmed the American segments. The film was poorly received in the United States, but did well in Japan. Throughout the next 20 years Masuda helmed a string of major studio productions, including Catastrophe 1999: The Prophecies of Nostradamus (aka Last Days of Planet Earth, 1974) and three more big-budget war films for the Toei Company: The Battle of Port Arthur (1980), The Great Japanese Empire (1982) and The Battle of the Sea of Japan: Go to Sea (1983).

Masuda became involved in animated films when producer Yoshinobu Nishizaki decided to make his own product. Nishizaki wanted to meld a live action influence into an anime series and was a fan of Nikkatsu Action, including Masuda's films with Yujiro Ishihara. He invited Masuda to direct on Leiji Matsumoto's science fiction television and film series Space Battleship Yamato (aka Star Blazers). Between 1977 and 1983, Masuda directed or co-directed all five Yamato films. The original series has been credited as Japan's first animated television space opera. The eponymous first film gained popularity when it played against Star Wars (1977) in Japanese theatres and it has been cited as the beginning of the golden age of anime.

He also made room for more intimate subject matter such as his High Teen Boogie (1982), in which a teenage biker falls in love with a straight-laced girl. The corporate drama Company Funeral (1989) was selected for the Kinema Junpo annual Best Ten list. Masuda's most recent feature film was the crime thriller Heavenly Sin (1992). It starred Sayuri Yoshinaga as a detective in near-future Tokyo and Omar Sharif as a Chinese Triad boss. Sharif replaced Yūsaku Matsuda who had died of cancer. The film was a critical and commercial failure. Masuda continued to direct and write for television.

== Filmmaking ==
As an assistant director and screenwriter at both Shintoho and Nikkatsu Studios, Toshio Masuda apprenticed under a number of directors. He has said Mikio Naruse had the greatest impact on him. He credited Kon Ichikawa with teaching him how to use the camera. His primary mentor at Nikkatsu was Umetsugu Inoue from whom he learned the value of linking together large setpieces to draw in audiences. Masuda was more inclined toward drama than his mentor and created the setpieces but then incorporated character-based drama into his work.

Masuda quickly climbed the Nikkatsu ranks to become a top director. The financial success of his star-studded action films, beginning with Yujiro Ishihara in Rusty Knife, ensured that studio heads would continue to assign him top stars and action films. He continued to write for his own films but mostly due to time constraints as he would have preferred to hire other writers, which did after he left the studio. The films were made quickly and largely without studio supervision. In one example, Ishihara began drawing huge audiences with The Guy Who Started a Storm which was released during the 1957 New Year season. Theatre owners were displeased that there were no further Ishihara films scheduled before Golden Week of the following year. The studio then order Masuda to make a film with Ishihara in ten days. Producer Takiko Mizunoe brought him a script by Shintarō Ishihara. Masuda found it much too long to be completed in the given time, rewrote it and then completed the film within 12 or 13 days.

Many of the settings and style he used in his films came from European and Hollywood cinema, but he framed it all in a Japanese context, in the spirit of "borderless" action cinema. He did not want to make typical films and the more European flavour of his work set him apart from many of his contemporaries. He made many yakuza films but considered them "youth films" put in a yakuza setting, favouring human drama over verisimilitude. The actors also were favoured over a distinctive visual style which, as writer Jasper Sharp suggested, may have accounted for his popular success in the star-based studio system. Despite production line genre work forming the bulk of his oeuvre, Masuda has always been able to express his views, even subversive ones, and reflect on societal issues through his films.

== Appraisal ==
Within the studio system, Toshio Masuda was a major figure in defining the Nikkatsu Action style. He has been called the studio's top action director and worked with the studio's biggest stars. He produced box office hits which are fondly remembered by Japanese fans into the 21st century, and are regarded as genre landmarks by Japanese critics. Masuda developed a reputation as a "pro's pro", who delivered consistently strong work in the difficult, fast-paced, production line environment of the Nikkatsu Company and did so on time and within budget. His films from this period remain little known outside Japan, largely eclipsed by the cult fame of Nikkatsu enfant terrible Seijun Suzuki. While preparing a Nikkatsu Action Cinema retrospective for the 2005 Udine Far East Film Festival, author and critic Mark Schilling found it likely that none of the five Masuda films he selected previously had been screened abroad. though Velvet Hustler was released on VHS cassette by Home Vision Entertainment on September 21, 2001, in North America.

After the collapse of the studio system, Masuda's career continued unabated. His best known film in the West is the blockbuster American-Japanese co-production Tora! Tora! Tora!, but his contributions somewhat are overshadowed by co-directors Richard Fleischer and Kinji Fukasaku—the latter of which later achieved international cult notoriety for his own yakuza films—despite having been responsible for the lion's share of the Japanese segments of the film. Masuda's animated works, especially the Space Battleship Yamato series, are remembered by anime fans worldwide. The first Yamato film originally reached overseas audiences in 1978, including theatrical screenings in England and American television. The series has since expanded into a full blown franchise.

A comprehensive, Japanese language book detailing Masuda's career was released in 2007, titled Masuda Toshio: The Complete Action Films of Giant Star Toshio Masuda (映画監督舛田利雄 アクション映画の巨星舛田利雄のすべて Eiga kantoku Masuda Toshio: akushon eiga no kyosei Masuda Toshio no subete). It includes an extensive interview with Masuda, approximately 500 pictures, poster images of his 52 Nikkatsu films and notes on all 82 feature films. Widely neglected by Western critics, writer Mark Schilling dedicated a section of his 2007 book No Borders, No Limits: Nikkatsu Action Cinema to Masuda, predominately focusing on said cinema. Musician and writer Chris D. has expressed an interest in doing likewise. No Borders, No Limits is an expanded edition of the version that accompanied the Nikkatsu Action Cinema retrospective Schilling programmed for the Far East Film Festival. Abridged versions of the retrospective have appeared in the United States. The Criterion Collection has optioned a number of films from the retrospective to be made available for the first time in the North American home video market.

== Death ==
Masuda died on 26 August 2026, at the age of 98.

== Filmography ==
Between 1958 and 1992, Toshio Masuda directed 82 feature films, 52 of those over the course of his decade with the Nikkatsu Company. He developed a reputation as a "hitmaker" and 16 of his films breached the top ten list for domestic Japanese box-office revenues. Only one other director has superseded that record.

Year	Title	Japanese	Romanization	Box Office Rank in Release Year
1958	A Journey of Body and Soul	心と肉体の旅	Kokoro to nikutai no tabi
1958	The Perfect Game	完全な遊戯	Kanzen'na yūgi
1958	Red Quay	赤い波止場	Akai hatoba
1958	Rusty Knife	錆びたナイフ	Sabita naifu	7
1959	The Man Who Risked Heaven and Earth aka The Sky Is Mine	天と地を駈ける男	Ten to chi o kakeru otoko	10
1960	The Brawler	喧嘩太郎	Kenka Tarō	4
1960	Man at the Bullfight	闘牛に賭ける男	Togyu ni kakeru otoko	3
1962	Hana and Ryu aka A Man with Dragon Tattoos	花と竜	Hana to Ryu	2
1964	Red Handkerchief	赤いハンカチ	Akai hankachi	3
1965	Taking The Castle	城取り	Shirotori
1967	Velvet Hustler	紅の流れ星	Kurenai no Nagareboshi
1968	Outlaw: Gangster VIP	「無頼」より 大幹部	Burai yori daikanbu
1969	The Fatal Raid	大幹部 殴り込み	Daikanbu Nagurikomi
1970	Tora! Tora! Tora!	トラ・トラ・トラ！	Tora! Tora! Tora!
1971	Law of the Outlaw aka Farewell to the Code	さらば掟	Saraba Okite
1972	Shadow Hunters	影狩り	Kage Gari
1972	Shadow Hunters 2: Echo of Destiny	影狩り ほえろ大砲	Kage Gari hoero taiho
1973	The Human Revolution	人間革命	Ningen kakumei	2
1974	Catastrophe 1999: The Prophecies of Nostradamus	ノストラダムスの大予言	Nosutoradamusu no daiyogen	2
1974	Orenochi wa Taninnochi	俺の血は他人の血	Orenochi wa Taninnochi
1976	The Human Revolution 2	続人間革命	Zoku ningen kakumei	1
1977	Space Battleship Yamato: The Movie	宇宙戦艦ヤマト 劇場版	Uchū Senkan Yamato: Gekijōban
1978	Farewell to Space Battleship Yamato	さらば宇宙戦艦ヤマト 愛の戦士たち	Saraba uchu senkan Yamato: Ai no senshitachi	2
1979	Yamato: The New Voyage	宇宙戦艦ヤマト 新たなる旅立ち	Uchū Senkan Yamato Aratanaru Tabidachi
1980	The Battle of Port Arthur aka 203 Kochi	二百三高地	Ni hyaku san kochi	3
1980	Be Forever Yamato	ヤマトよ永遠に	Yamato yo towa ni	5
1982	The Great Japanese Empire	大日本帝国	Dainippon teikoku	3
1982	High Teen Boogie	ハイティーン・ブギ	Hai tiin bugi	2
1982	Future War 198X	フューチャーウォー198X年	Fyūchā Wō Sen Kyū Hachi Ekkusu-nen
1983	Battle Anthem aka The Battle of the Sea of Japan: Go to Sea	日本海大海戦 海ゆかば	Nihonkai daikaisen: Umi yukaba
1985	Love: Take Off aka Love: Starting on a Journey	愛・旅立ち	Ai: Tabidachi	7
1987	Tokyo Blackout	首都消失	Shuto shōshitsu
1989	Company Executives	社葬	Shaso
1991	Earthshaking Event	動天	Dōten	9
1991	Sure Death 5	必殺!5 黄金の血	Hissatsu!5 Ōgon no Chi
1991	The Great Shogunate Battle	江戸城大乱	Edo Jō Tairan
1992	Great Conquest: Romance of Three Kingdoms	三国志 第一部 英雄たちの夜明け	Sangokushi Daiichibu Eiyū-tachi no Yoake
1992	Heavenly Sin	天国の大罪	Tengoku no Taizai

== Awards and nominations ==
At the 1981 Japanese Academy Awards, Toshio Masuda was nominated for Best Director for his film The Battle of Port Arthur. He won the Kinema Junpo Readers' Choice Award for Best Film for the same film. In 1990, he was again nominated for Best Director at the Japanese Academy Awards for Company Funeral. He won in the same category at the Blue Ribbon Awards and the Mainichi Film Awards.
