= Season of the Sun (2002 miniseries) =

- Taiyō no Kisetsu
- Directed by: Nobuhiro Doi
- Starring: Hideaki Takizawa
- Country of origin: Japan
- Original language: Japanese
- No. of episodes: 11

Original release
- Network: TBS
- Release: July 7 – September 15, 2002

Taiyo no Kisetsu (太陽の季節, lit. Season of the Sun) is a Japanese drama TV miniseries which first aired on July 7, 2002. It starred Hideaki Takizawa and was directed by Nobuhiro Doi. The program was a remake of an earlier film of the same name, released in 1956.

== Plot summary ==
Tatsuya (Takizawa), a tormented college student who was once an all-around nice guy, now seems to be balancing a gigantic grudge on his shoulder. What the grudge is, has yet to be revealed, although it likely has something to do with his father and the poverty that plagues his life.

For some unknown reason, Tatsuya has taken to hanging around with the richest child in school, basically a trusting, nice guy whom Tatsuya is out to destroy. He feels an uncontrollable urge to deface the rich kid's new car and chase after his fiancée. Complicating the plot further is Tatsuya's run-in with a young composer and pianist, who has a limp from injuries sustained in a car accident many years before. She, too, is rich, although Tatsuya does not know it yet. Stuck in a stifling home environment with her pianist mother who disdains her desire to compose, the obedient young woman begins to change after a chance meeting with Tatsuya, while he seems to regain some of his humanity in his interaction with her.

== Cast ==
- Hideaki Takizawa - Tatsuya
- Kota Yabu - Younger Tatsuya
- Chizuru Ikewaki
- Yoshinori Okada
- Rio Matsumoto
- Takaoka Sousuke - Shinji
- Marika Matsumoto

== See also ==
- Season of the Sun, 1955 novel
- Season of the Sun (1956 film)
