= Tōru Abe =

Japanese film actor

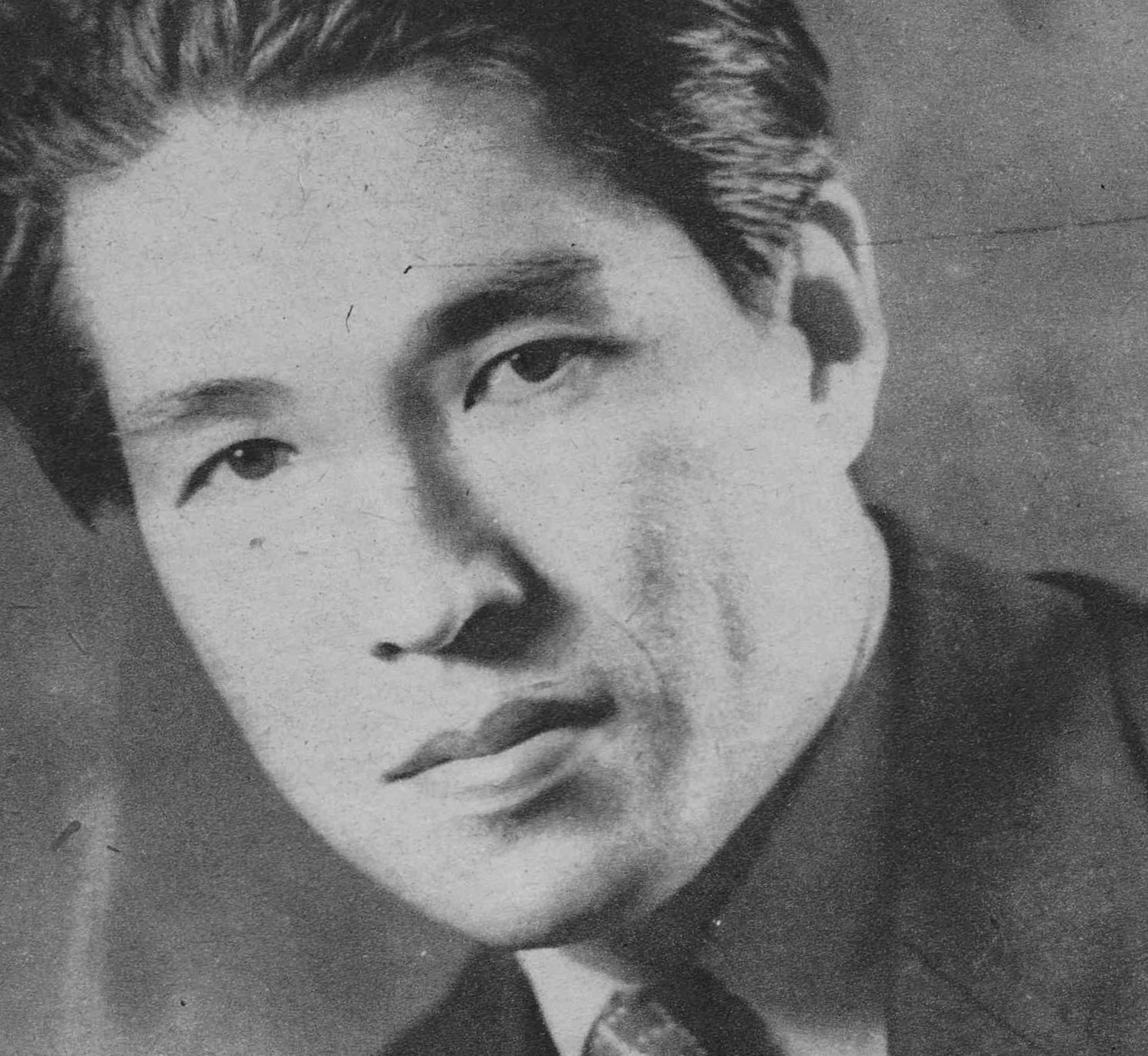
- Born: 28 March 1917; Munakata, Fukuoka, Japan
- Died: 18 July 1993 (aged 76)
- Occupation: Actor
- Years active: 1944–1985

Tōru Abe (安部 徹, Abe Tōru; 28 March 1917 – 18 July 1993) was a Japanese film actor. He appeared in more than 100 films from 1944 to 1985.

== Selected filmography ==
Film
Year	Title	Role	Notes
1953	Tokyo Story	Railway employee	
1955	Tales of Ginza	Gô Momoyama	
1955	The Eternal Breasts	Yamagami	
1957	Man Who Causes a Storm		
1958	Underworld Beauty		
1958	Kurenai no Tsubasa	Takeshi Iwami	
1963	Zatoichi the Fugitive	Boss Yagiri Tokyuro	
1963	Kanto Wanderer	Dairyu Yoshida	
1965	Abashiri Prison		
1966	Rampaging Dragon of the North		
1969	Daikanbu Nagurikomi	Nishio	
1970	Blind Woman's Curse	Dobashi	
1970	The Militarists	Chūichi Nagumo	
1970	Tora! Tora! Tora!	Rear Adm. Takijirō Ōnishi	Uncredited
1969	Daimon Otokode Shinitai	Giichiro Omori	
1971	Blood Vendetta	Hideo Tokuzawa	
1974	Lady Snowblood: Love Song of Vengeance	Kendo Terauchi	
1974	Orenochi wa Taninnochi	Toraichiro Yamaga	
1975	Cross the Rubicon!	Hada	
1975	Cops vs. Thugs	Azuma Kikuchi	

=== Voice acting ===
- The Bridge on the River Kwai – Major Warden (Jack Hawkins)
