= Hideko Yoshida =

Japanese actress

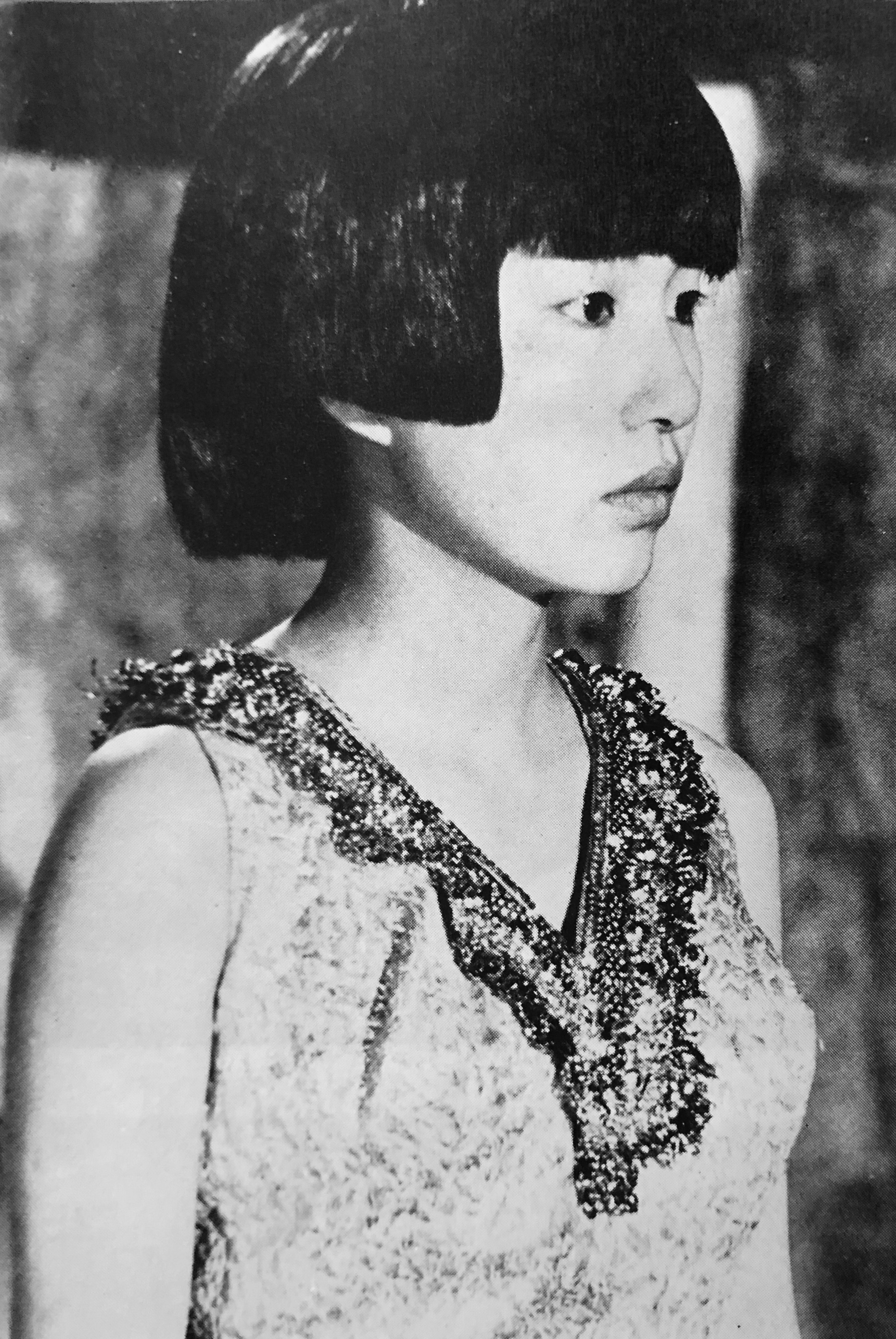
- Hideko Yoshida in 1967
- Born: January 7, 1944 (age 82); Kanazawa, Ishikawa, Japan
- Occupation: Actress

Hideko Yoshida (吉田日出子) is a Japanese actress. She won the award for best supporting actress at the 14th Hochi Film Award for Shaso.

== Filmography ==
- Neo Tokyo (1989)
- Shaso (1989)
- The Pillow Book (1996)
- Will to Live (1999)
- By Player (2000)
- Cutie Honey (2004)
- Heaven's Bookstore (2004)
- Southbound (2007)
