= Tales of Ginza =

1955 Japanese film

- Film poster
- Directed by: Yūzō Kawashima
- Written by: Ruiju Yanagisawa; Yūichirō Inoue (novel)
- Produced by: Kaneo Iwai
- Starring: Tōru Abe; Shinsuke Ashida; Mie Kitahara
- Cinematography: Minoru Yokoyama
- Edited by: Tadashi Nakamura
- Music by: Takio Niki
- Production company: Nikkatsu
- Distributed by: Nikkatsu
- Release date: 16 September 1955
- Running time: 117 minutes
- Country: Japan
- Language: Japanese

Tales of Ginza (Japanese: 銀座二十四帖, Hepburn: Ginza nijūyonjō) is a 1955 Japanese drama film directed by Yūzō Kawashima.

== Cast ==
- Tōru Abe as Gō Momoyama
- Shinsuke Ashida as Gorō Mitsuboshi
- Seizaburō Kawazu as Katsumi Kyōgoku
- Mie Kitahara as Yukino Nakamachi
- Tatsuya Mihashi as Kan Mimurodo
- Hisaya Morishige as Narrator
