= Takiko Mizunoe =

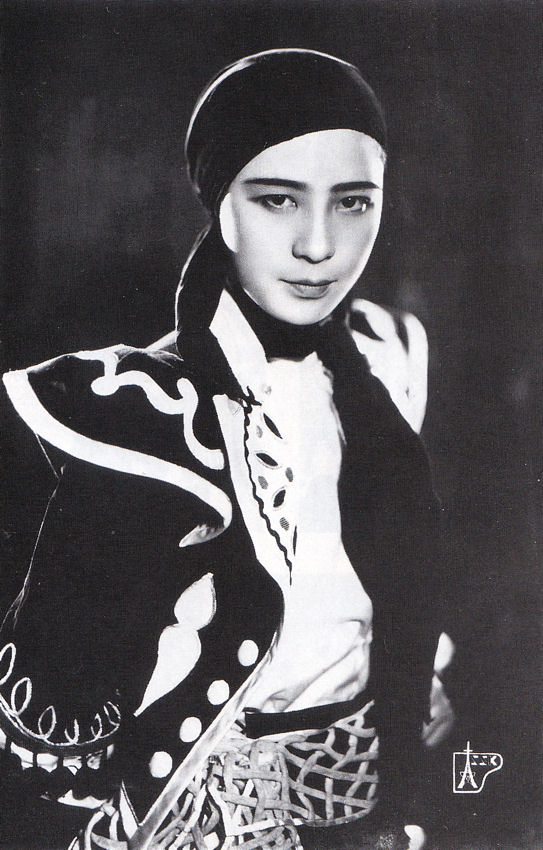
- Takiko Mizunoe in 1935
- Born: Umeko Miura; 20 February 1915; Otaru, Hokkaido, Japan
- Died: 16 November 2009 (aged 94)
- Occupations: actress, film producer, presenter

Takiko Mizunoe (水の江 瀧子, Mizunoe Takiko), born Umeko Miura (三浦 ウメ子, Miura Umeko; 20 February 1915 – 16 November 2009), was a Japanese actress, film producer, and radio and TV presenter. She was born in Otaru, Hokkaido, and began her career by acting in Shochiku's musical theatre troupe. Later she became one of Japan’s first female film producers, working with the actors Yujiro Ishihara and Masumi Okada and the director Koreyoshi Kurahara at Nikkatsu during the studio’s golden age. Films she produced include Season of the Sun and Crazed Fruit. She also twice hosted the New Year’s Eve music show Kōhaku Uta Gassen.

== Biography ==
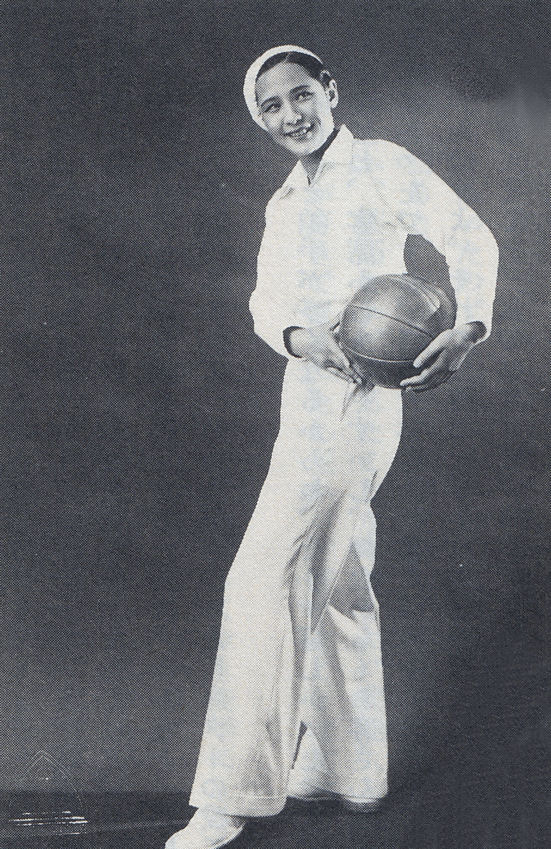
Mizunoe performs the role of a young man in 1931.

=== Early life ===
Born Umeko Miura in Otaru, Hokkaido, in 1915, she was the seventh of eight siblings. Her family eventually settled in Meguro City, Tokyo, where she grew up. In 1928, she enrolled in the training program for the all-female Shochiku Opera Company, a onetime competitor of the Takarazuka Revue. There, she was given the stage name Takiko Mizunoe. Mizunoe cut her hair short, a novelty at the time—while Takarazuka had pioneered the trend of women who play male parts, referred to as otokoyaku ((男役), literally "male role"), actresses in the troupe would simply tuck their long hair under a hat. This marked the beginning of Mizunoe's signature "cross-dressed fair lady" style, and she became known for her appearances onstage in a silk hat and tuxedo. The trend of otokoyaku cutting their hair short would eventually spread to Takarazuka as well, where it is still common practice today.

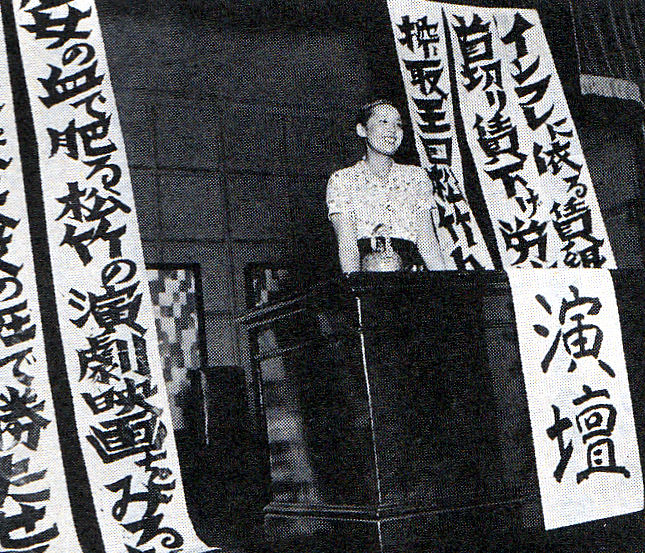
Mizunoe gives a speech during the Pink Strike.

=== The Pink Strike ===
In June–July 1933, at age 18, Mizunoe led one of the Japanese labor movement's few successful actions of the period when she headed a strike of the Shochiku Opera Company's performers in reaction to wage cuts. By this point, Mizunoe had become a star, and news of the "Pink Strike"—so called because it was led by young women in their teens and 20s—spread throughout the media. The strike lasted for a month, and nearly 50 strikers were arrested, including Mizunoe. Eventually the action was successful, in part because the company could not be seen as exploiting its most popular star, and the company's management offered improved labor conditions and a wage increase for musicians.

=== Revue star and World War II ===
Although the Shochiku Opera Company dismissed Mizunoe for two months following the labor dispute, she returned to the stage in September 1933 with a one-woman show, ushering in her peak period as a revue star. Mizunoe continued to be popular in male roles throughout the prewar period, with critics describing her as a "symbol of Girls' Opera." She toured northern China, the United States, and Europe, but returned to Japan as the country entered World War II. During the war, Japan imposed restrictions on cross-dressing, which forced Mizunoe to perform in female roles. Touring also became difficult due to restrictions on non-military travel and Allied air raids.

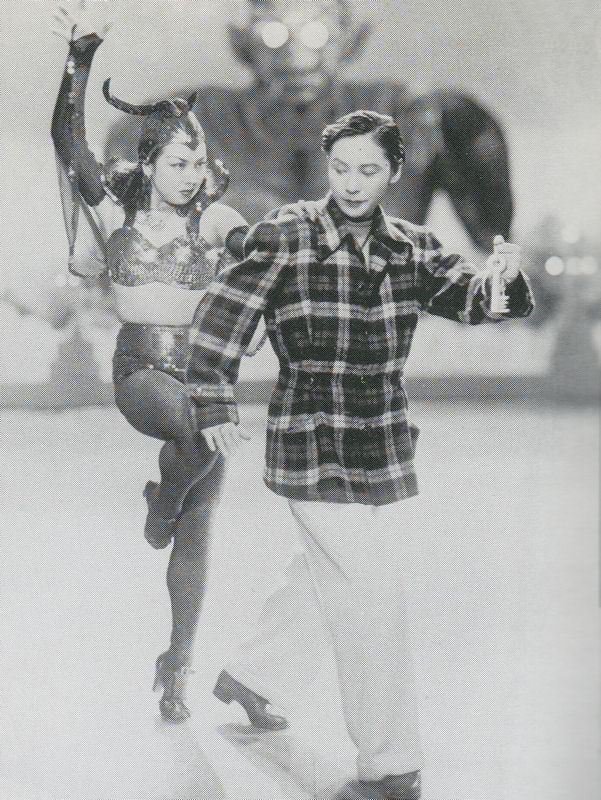
Mizunoe in Hana Kurabe Tanuki Goten, her first major film role, in 1949

=== Screen career and film producer ===
After the war, Mizunoe transitioned to a film career, beginning with 1949's Hana Kurabe Tanuki Goten. She also appeared on television, including as a host of the now long-running New Year’s Eve music show Kōhaku Uta Gassen in its first few years on air. In 1954, she was hired as a producer for Nikkatsu, Japan's oldest major movie studio, becoming one of the first female film producers in Japan. Her first film, Hatsukoi Kanariya Musume, was released the following year. In 1956, she produced the film adaptation of Shintaro Ishihara's Season of the Sun, the debut film for Japanese film icon Yujiro Ishihara, Shintaro's brother. Mizunoe would go on to collaborate with the Ishihara brothers again on Crazed Fruit, a controversial film that influenced foreign filmmakers such as François Truffaut. She discovered and promoted a number of other actors who would go on to successful careers in Japan's film industry, including Ruriko Asaoka and Masumi Okada, as well as current National Diet politician Akiko Santō. Mizunoe produced dozens of movies across a 16-year producing career before leaving Nikkatsu in 1970.

=== Retirement and later years ===
After ending her career as a producer, Mizunoe continued appearing on television until she retired in 1987, following an incident in which her nephew Kazuyoshi Miura was accused of murdering his wife. In the ensuing media attention surrounding Miura's case, allegations emerged that he was actually Mizunoe's child, not her nephew. Mizunoe, who never married, denied the allegation that Miura was her secret child as "baseless." Nevertheless, she largely retreated from public life, retiring to her home in Kanagawa prefecture, where she died in 2009 of natural causes at the age of 94.

== Partial filmography ==
=== As an actress ===
- The Invisible Man Appears (1949)
- Sandakan No. 8 (1974)

=== As a producer ===
- Season of the Sun (1956)
- Crazed Fruit (1956)
- I Am Waiting (1957)
- Red Quay (1958)
- Rusty Knife (1958)
- Crimson Wings (1958)
- Ue o Muite Arukō (1962)
