= Kage Gari =

Japanese manga series

影狩り
- Manga
- Written by: Takao Saito
- Published by: Shogakukan
- Magazine: Weekly Post
- Original run: 1969 – 1973
- Live-action film
- Directed by: Toshio Masuda
- Written by: Kaneo Ikegami
- Studio: Toho
- Released: 1972
- Runtime: 90 minutes

Kage Gari (影狩り; lit. Shadow Hunters) is a 1969 jidaigeki manga series by Takao Saito. It follows the adventures of three ronin - Jubei (十兵衛), Sunlight (日光), and Moonlight (月光) - who dedicate their lives to hunt down "shadows", the ninja spies of the Tokugawa shogunate.

== Films ==
The series was later adapted into two live-action films in 1972 Kage Gari and Kage Gari Hoero taiho directed by Toshio Masuda and screenplay by Kaneo Ikegami.

=== Kage Gari ===
(June 10, 1972, Runningtime 90minutes)

- Yujiro Ishihara as Muroto Jubei
- Ryōhei Uchida as Niko (Sunlight)
- Mikio Narita as Geiko (Moonlight)
- Ruriko Asaoka as Chitose
- Isao Tamagawa as Shouji Sukejuro
- Kōjirō Kusanagi as Jinma Senjuro
- Shinjirō Ehara as Kosaka Kurando
- Tetsurō Tamba as Tanuma Ogitsugu
- Shunsuke Kariya as Koroku
- Ryutaro Tatsumi as Makino Zusho

=== Kage Gari Hoero Taihō ===
(October 10, 1972, Runningtime 89minutes)

- Yujiro Ishihara as Muroto Jubei
- Ryōhei Uchida as Sunlight (日光)
- Mikio Narita Moonlight (月光)
- Tetsurō Tamba as Kage Metsuke
- Mari Shiraki as Osen
- Junko Natsu as Shibatsuji Miya
- Yoshi Katō as Michinari Shibatsuji
- Kenji Sahara as Besho Hayato

== Other adaptations ==
- Kage Gari (Television drama in 1983) starring by Tatsuya Nakadai, Directed by Akira Inoue.
- Shin Kage Gari (新・影狩り), a new manga series by Kenji Okamura in 2011.
