= Red Quay =

- Film poster
- Directed by: Toshio Masuda
- Screenplay by: Ichiro Ikeda; Toshio Masuda
- Produced by: Takiko Mizunoe
- Starring: Yujiro Ishihara; Mie Kitahara; Yukiko Todoroki; Shiro Osaka
- Cinematography: Shinsaku Himeda
- Edited by: Tsuji Masanori
- Music by: Hajime Kaburagi
- Release date: 23 September 1958 (Japan)
- Country: Japan

Red Quay (Japanese: 赤い波止場, Hepburn: Akai hatoba) is a 1958 Japanese black-and-white action film, directed by Toshio Masuda.

Red Quay was one of the many successful collaborations between director Toshio Masuda and actor Yujiro Ishihara which defined the Nikkatsu action film genre.

== Plot ==
Tominaga Jiro has slaughtered five yakuza in Tokyo and is now staying at the Matsuyama group in Kobe. Tominaga accidentally witnesses the scene where a restaurant owner Sugita is killed due to the trouble of drug trafficking at Kobe Port.

== Cast ==
- Yujiro Ishihara : Tominaga Jiro
- Mie Kitahara : Sugita Keiko
- Masumi Okada : Tabō
- Sanae Nakahara : Mammy
- Shirō Ōsaka : Noro
- Jun Miyazaki : Sugita
- Hideaki Nitani : Katsumata

== Release ==
Red Quay was released on 23 September 1958.
