= Shaso =

- DVD cover
- Directed by: Toshio Masuda
- Written by: Hiro Matsuda
- Produced by: Keita Senoo; Kyo Namura
- Starring: Ken Ogata; Yukiyo Toake; Tōru Emori; Tomisaburo Wakayama
- Cinematography: Kiyoshi Kitasaka
- Edited by: Isamu Ichida
- Music by: Ryudo Uzaki
- Distributed by: Toei Company
- Release date: June 10, 1989 (Japan)
- Running time: 130 minutes
- Country: Japan
- Language: Japanese

Shaso (Japanese: 社葬), also known as Company Executives, Company Funeral or Company-Sponsored Funeral, is a 1989 Japanese drama thriller film directed by Toshio Masuda. Toei Company released the film on June 10, 1989, in Japan.

== Cast ==
- Ken Ogata
- Yukiyo Toake
- Kōichi Satō
- Mariko Fuji
- Miyuki Imori
- Hideko Yoshida
- Yōko Nogiwa
- Issey Ogata
- Eiichiro Funakoshi
- Jun Negami
- Hōsei Komatsu
- Kazuo Kitamura
- Takeshi Katō
- Hideo Takamatsu as Okabe Kensuke
- Tadao Nakamaru
- Shinsuke Ashida
- Tōru Emori
- Tomisaburo Wakayama

== Awards ==
14th Hochi Film Awards

- Won: Best Director - Toshio Masuda
- Won: Best Supporting Actress - Hideko Yoshida

32nd Blue Ribbon Awards

- Won: Best Director - Toshio Masuda

44th Mainichi Film Awards

- Won: Excellence Film (shared with Death of a Tea Master, Dotsuitarunen and Rikyu)
- Won: Best Director - Toshio Masuda
- Won: Best Screenplay - Hiro Matsuda
- Won: Kinuyo Tanaka Award - Yukiyo Toake

2nd Nikkan Sports Film Awards

- Won: Best Actress - Yukiyo Toake (also won for Harasu no Ita Hibi)

13th Japan Academy Awards

- Nominated: Picture of the Year
- Nominated: Director of the Year - Toshio Masuda
- Nominated: Screenplay of the Year - Hiro Matsuda
- Nominated: Outstanding Performance by an Actor in a Leading Role - Ken Ogata (also nominated for Shogun's Shadow)
- Nominated: Outstanding Performance by an Actress in a Leading Role - Yukiyo Toake
- Nominated: Outstanding Performance by an Actor in a Supporting Role - Tōru Emori
- Nominated: Outstanding Performance by an Actress in a Supporting Role - Hideko Yoshida
- Nominated: Outstanding Achievement in Film Editing - Isamu Ichida (also nominated for Four Days of Snow and Blood and Yakuza Ladies 3)
- Nominated: Outstanding Achievement in Music - Ryudo Uzaki
- Nominated: Outstanding Achievement in Art Direction - Akira Naitō

63rd Kinema Junpo Best Ten Awards

- Best Ten List: 9th place
