= Season of the Sun (1956 film) =

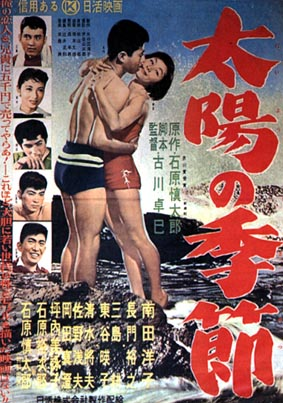
- Japanese movie poster
- Directed by: Takumi Furukawa
- Written by: Takumi Furukawa (screenplay); Shintarō Ishihara (novel)
- Produced by: Nikkatsu, Takiko Mizunoe
- Cinematography: Saburo Isayama
- Music by: Masaru Sato
- Release date: May 17, 1956
- Running time: 59 minutes
- Country: Japan
- Language: Japanese

Season of the Sun (太陽の季節, Taiyō no kisetsu) is a 1956 black-and-white Japanese film directed by Takumi Furukawa.

This film is a 1956 feature film adaptation of Shintarō Ishihara's novel Season of the Sun. It was also noteworthy because it marked the cinema debut, in a supporting role, of Yujiro Ishihara (brother of the author of the novel), who went on to become one of Japan's most successful film stars of the late 1950s and early 1960s (and who remains a cultural icon following his untimely death in 1987).

== Plot ==
The film tells the story of a group of high school boxing team members who spend their days drinking, sailing and chasing girls, and who more often than not spend their nights getting into brawls. In particular, it focuses upon Tatsuya, a sullen young man, who falls in love with Eiko, a proud upper-class girl.

== Cast ==
- Yōko Minamida as Eiko Takeda
- Hiroyuki Nagato as Tatsuya Tsugawa
- Ko Mishima
- Asao Sano
- Masumi Okada as Bandmaster
- Masao Shimizu
- Yujiro Ishihara as Mr. Izu
- Shintarō Ishihara as Soccer player

== See also ==
- Taiyō no Kisetsu, a 2002 film
