= Orenochi wa Taninnochi =

- Film poster
- Directed by: Toshio Masuda
- Screenplay by: Toshio Masuda.
- Based on: Orenochi wa Taninnochi by Yasutaka Tsutsui
- Starring: Shōhei Hino; Frankie Sakai; Toru Abe; Ichirō Nakatani
- Music by: Hiroshi Takada
- Distributed by: Shochiku
- Release date: October 12, 1974 (Japan)
- Running time: 91 minutes
- Country: Japan
- Language: Japanese

Orenochi wa Taninnochi (Japanese: 俺の血は他人の血, Hepburn: Orenochi wa Taninnochi), also known as Blood or My Blood is the Blood of Others in English, is a 1974 Japanese science fiction film directed by Toshio Masuda, based on Yasutaka Tsutsui's novel of the same title. Shōhei Hino made his feature film debut in this production.

== Plot ==
Kinugawa Ryosuke transfused yakuza's blood when he was a child; due to that blood transfusion, he sometimes transforms into a super-human.

== Cast ==
- Shōhei Hino as Kinugawa Ryosuke
- Frankie Sakai as Rokosuke Sawamura
- Toru Abe as Toraichiro Yamaga
- Etsuko Nanmi
- Wataru Nachi
- Hosei Komatsu
- Ichirō Nakatani as Itami
