= Doten =

Doten is a surname. Notable people with the surname include:

- Alfred Doten (1829–1903), American journalist and diarist
- Edward Doten (c. 1599–1655), English passenger on the 1620 voyage of the Mayflower
- Mark Doten, American novelist and librettist
- Stuart van Doten (born 1989), Dutch former footballer
