= Red Handkerchief =

1964 film directed by Toshio Masuda

- Film poster
- Directed by: Toshio Masuda
- Screenplay by: Toshio Masuda; Hideki Ogawa
- Starring: Yūjirō Ishihara; Ruriko Asaoka; Hideaki Nitani; Nobuo Kaneko; Reiko Sasamori
- Distributed by: Nikkatsu
- Release date: January 3, 1964 (Japan)
- Running time: 98 minutes
- Country: Japan
- Language: Japanese

Red Handkerchief (Japanese: 赤いハンカチ) is a 1964 Japanese film directed by Toshio Masuda. It was inspired by Yujiro Ishihara's hit song of the same title.

== Plot ==
Mikami was deceived by his friend and colleague detective Ishizuka, but he didn't know the fact and was forced to quit the job, and left Yokohama. But one day he heard from a person that the reason he had to quit the job was by Ishizuka's deceiving. and he wanted to solve the riddle. Mikami returns to Yokohama again and knows that Ishizuka is now a businessman and was married to his former lover. Now Ishizuka tries to murder Mikami.

== Cast ==
- Yūjirō Ishihara as Jirō Mikami
- Ruriko Asaoka as Reiko Hiraoka
- Hideaki Nitani as Takeshi Ishizuka
- Tamio Kawachi as Seiji
- Shinsuke Ashida as Morita
- Nobuo Kaneko as Tsuchiya
- Yoko Yamamoto as Maid
- Reiko Sasamori as Mitsuko
- Masao Shimizu
