= Future War 198X =

- Film poster
- Directed by: Tomoharu Katsumata; Toshio Masuda
- Written by: Kōji Takada
- Produced by: Toru Yoshida
- Starring: Kin'ya Kitaōji; Masako Natsume
- Narrated by: Ryo Ishihara
- Cinematography: Hisao Shirai; Michiyo Terao
- Edited by: Yasuhiro Yoshikawa; Yutaka Chikura
- Music by: Seiji Yokoyama
- Production company: Toei Animation
- Distributed by: Toei Company
- Release date: 30 October 1982 (Japan)
- Running time: 125 minutes
- Country: Japan
- Language: Japanese
- Budget: ~600 million yen (US$6.5 million in 2023)

Future War 198X (Japanese: フューチャーウォー198X年, Hepburn: Fyūchā Wō Sen Kyū Hachi Ekkusu-nen) is a 1982 Japanese anime science fiction war original video animation directed by Toshio Masuda and Tomoharu Katsumata. Set during the Cold War in an unspecified year of the 1980s, the film details the outbreak of World War III between NATO and the Warsaw Pact. It is partially inspired by the 1982 speculative war novel The Third World War: The Untold Story by Sir John Hackett.

Future War 198X was created by Toei Animation, but was animated by outsourced animators. Prior to its release, the film sparked controversy in Japan over reports, based on an early script, that the film had a strongly pro-war narrative, and its production and release were boycotted by over 30 organizations; this led to the script being greatly reworked, shifting to an anti-war film by release.

Future War 198X was released on 30 October 1982. Retrospective reviews criticized the film as being slow-paced and having a weak, unconvincing message.

A German dub was later released for home video as Null Zeit (Zero Hour) in West Germany and Das Ende aller Tage (The End of All Days) in East Germany. An English version, also for home video, was released by Wizard Video in Australia as Future War; however, this was not a dub and instead had the original Japanese audio with English voiceovers, as well as a shortened runtime and licensed music replacing the original film score. In March 2018, the Japanese version was distributed digitally for a single day through PlayStation Video. Due to the film's limited distribution, especially internationally, copies of Future War 198X are considered particularly rare.

== Plot ==
In September 1985, (Note: The 1980 Summer Olympics are stated to have occurred five years prior to the events of the film.) the United States test-launches "Space Ranger"—a crewed missile defense space weapon consisting of four laser-equipped modules and their mother ship Albatross—at Vandenberg Air Force Base. Space Ranger inventor Burt Gains believes Space Ranger could render ICBMs obsolete, but privately admits to his sister Laura and Japanese Space Ranger astronaut Wataru Mikumo his fears that it could worsen the nuclear arms race. Meanwhile in Neinberg, West Germany, farm girl Marina and her boyfriend, British Army missile crewman Michael, prepare for New Year's Day, while near Hokkaido, the Japan Air Self-Defense Force intercepts a Soviet Tu-22 in another increasingly-frequent airspace incursion.

The next morning, Gains is kidnapped by Soviet spies trying to smuggle him to the Soviet Union in an Alfa-class submarine. To protect Space Ranger's secrets, U.S. President Jay Gibson orders the submarine sunk, which can only be done with a nuclear torpedo due to its depth, annihilating the submarine and killing everyone aboard, including Gains. With U.S.–Soviet tensions inflamed, Soviet Premier Orlov is offered a reasoned response by First Deputy Premier Kutsov and military retaliation by hawkish Minister of Defence Bugarin, but opts to mobilize the Soviet Armed Forces and test a Soviet "interceptor satellite" as a message to Gibson. Wataru is assigned to replace Gains in the Space Ranger program, and he falls in love with Laura.

On New Year's Eve, Soviet Air Forces Captain Boris Sorenkuga defects to a West German Air Force air base near Neinberg in the top-secret Su-28 Black Dragon stealth bomber. To avoid losing critical military secrets, Orlov, under Bugarin's urging, reluctantly permits a Spetsnaz assault on the air base solely to neutralize Sorenkuga and the Black Dragon, before having a heart attack. The Spetsnaz air assault succeeds, but the fighting spills over the Inner German border, sparking war in Europe. Wataru and Laura learn of the war while in Tokyo for the New Year, and Wataru rushes back to Vandenberg, ignoring Laura's pleas to stay with her. While Gibson struggles to negotiate a ceasefire while balancing NATO's demands for a first strike, the battle in Germany destroys Neinberg and kills Marina; despondent, Michael steals a missile carrier and launches its tactical nuclear missile at Soviet forces, killing everyone in the battle and fatally poisoning Michael with radiation. The nuclear strike prompts a global escalation of the war as theaters open across the world. Gibson receives a ceasefire proposal from Orlov, but rejects its unrealistic demands; Secretary of State Girard theorizes Orlov himself may not have sent it. In Moscow, Kutsov and the Politburo deduce Bugarin is falsifying the absent Orlov's orders and plan to arrest him to call a proper ceasefire, but Bugarin launches a coup d'état and has the Politburo detained.

Soviet Navy ballistic missile submarine Rurik 4 is attacked and stricken by NATO submarines in the Atlantic Ocean, prompting the executive officer to order nuclear strikes on the U.S., killing the captain when he refuses; Gibson reluctantly orders retaliatory strikes on the Soviet Union. As Bugarin prepares further launches, Orlov reveals he is alive and overrides Bugarin's launch orders, but Bugarin's aide assassinates Orlov before he can negotiate with Gibson via the Moscow–Washington hotline. The resulting nuclear exchange devastates cities across the world, killing tens of millions in the initial strikes alone; despite the destruction, society remains intact and the war continues. In the Presidential Emergency Operations Center, Gibson learns Vandenberg is intact and orders Space Ranger's immediate deployment to counter any further missile launches. Wataru joins the Space Ranger mission while Laura, having survived Tokyo's destruction, traverses the ruined city to find a way to reach Vandenberg. The anti-war movement swells worldwide as people in once-fractured regions unite to demand peace and the Pope delivers a stirring globally-broadcast speech against the war, prompting disillusioned soldiers on both sides to desert en masse.

Space Ranger is launched, but Bugarin sends Soviet satellite interceptors that overwhelm the crew; three laser modules are destroyed, the fourth is crippled, and the Albatross is severely damaged. In Moscow, Kutsov is released and confronts Bugarin, who reveals his plan to annihilate all remaining opposition with MIRV-loaded ICBMs, allowing Soviet communism to reign uncontested. Realizing he has gone mad, Kutsov and Bugarin's former supporters attempt to stop him, but Bugarin manages to launch the ICBMs before being shot and killed. Laura arrives at Vandenberg and is allowed to board a Space Shuttle sent to rendezvous with Wataru. In space, Wataru repairs the fourth module and, assisted by the crewed Soviet satellite Baikal, manages to shoot down most of the MIRVs except one bound for Los Angeles. Unable to get a clear shot, Wataru flies the Albatross extremely close to the MIRV, destroying it but knocking him unconscious and throwing him into space. Gibson and Kutsov dispatch the American shuttle and Baikal to retrieve Wataru. As the spacecraft close in, Wataru regains consciousness to see the Sun rise from behind the battered Earth, its inhabitants now set on world peace.

== Cast ==
- Kin'ya Kitaōji as Wataru Mikumo (Robert Manning in the English version)
- Masako Natsume as Laura Gains
- Hidekatsu Shibata as Burt Gains
- Keiichi Noda as Institute Director Brown
- Yoshio Kaneuchi as U.S. President Jay Gibson
- Osamu Kobayashi as U.S. Secretary of State Girard
- Tamio Ōki as U.S. Chairman of the Joint Chiefs of Staff McCoy
- Masashi Amenomori as Soviet Premier Orlov
- Yōichi Miyakawa as Soviet First Deputy Premier Kutsov
- Takeshi Aono as Soviet Minister of Defense Bugarin
- Chikao Otsuka as Lieutenant Colonel Stroganov
- Yasuo Tanaka as Koiso
- Gorō Naya as JSDF Commanding General Tōno

== Production ==
It is unclear when production on Future War 198X started, but it was primarily conducted by Toei Animation. Most of the production staff had previously worked on the Space Battleship Yamato franchise. Toei Animation's managing director Akinori Watanabe stated Toei's intention was to produce the film in a "realistic" art style with "Western-style images"; to this end, the film's aesthetic was mostly influenced by Japanese film illustrator Noriyoshi Ohrai, who also created illustrations, posters, and concept art.

Production was assisted by former Japan Self-Defense Forces Major General Iwano Masataka, the film's music was performed by the New Japan Philharmonic, and the film's costumes were designed by French fashion designer André Courrèges. Production cost a total of approximately 600 million yen.

=== Controversy ===
In February 1981, Toei Animation's labor union received an early copy of the film's script and, after reviewing it, described it as "dangerous", citing a pro-war narrative that viewed nuclear warfare positively. In April 1981, the union announced in The Asahi Shimbun that their members would not be participating in the film's production. This forced the film's animation to be completed by outsourced animators.

Future War 198X was controversial in Japan due to its depictions of nuclear war and the aftermath of war, and it was argued that the film glorified warfare, was right-wing propaganda, or was otherwise unsuitable for children to watch. The film was boycotted and protested by Toei Animation's labor union, joined by approximately 38 organizations, including the Japan Association for the Protection of Children, the Mothers Association of Japan, the Japan Teachers' Union in Tokyo, and even the formation of a dedicated protest movement by these organizations called "Group Against 198X". On 25 May 1981, a physical protest against the film's release was held at the Japan Education Center in Tokyo. The goals of each organization reportedly differed: parent–teacher associations complained that war was being promoted in a positive light, while labor unions argued the Soviet Union was portrayed too negatively and criticized how Toei's animators were required to work on a film they ideologically disagreed with. This controversy was timely, as Prime Minister Yasuhiro Nakasone was perceived to be staunchly militaristic and supportive of a Japanese nuclear weapons program, and over the years after the Future War 198X controversy the anime industry's labor unions continued to lobby against Nakasone's policies.

The April 1982 issue of Animage covered the controversy in an article by Koichi Kato, in which several Future War 198X staff members, including Toei managing director Akinori Watanabe, provided details on the film's development and responded to criticisms, interspersed with commentary from parent–teacher association members and labor union officials. Watanabe denied that the film was pro-war or promoted right-wing beliefs, instead positioning the film as a "moving Guernica" and stating "showing the audience what would happen if World War III broke out is a true suggestion for peace." Animation director Tomoharu Katsumada also stated he would never make a pro-war film, having himself lived through World War II as a child. Both notably criticized the idea that the film was intended for youth to begin with, and lambasted the anime industry's standard of pandering to the toy and figurine industry to market to children (the film featured real weapons that were not toys, making marketing this way difficult).

In the May 1982 issue of Animage, the Future War 198X staff's response was criticized by Gundam animator and character designer Yoshikazu Yasuhiko in his monthly column in the magazine. Yasuhiko criticized Watanabe's response as "reeking of hypocrisy", opined the film did not deserve its high budget, and argued the medium of anime was "unsuitable for a serious consideration of war". Yasuhiko had made a statement on that topic in the April 1982 issue, opining it was better to not touch upon war and politics if one was unable to handle that subject matter correctly; in this context, Yasuhiko believed Future War 198X did not have a serious grasp on war and politics and would be unable to properly communicate its messages to an audience.

In response to the controversy, director Toshio Masuda rewrote the film to take on a strong anti-war theme by its release.

== Release ==
Future War 198X was initially intended to be screened at the Cannes Film Festival, but this never happened.

A German dub was released in West and East Germany. The German dub removed particularly bloody and violent scenes, reducing the film's runtime by approximately 10 minutes. The film was reportedly also released in Italy. It was later aired on Greek television dubbed in Greek, most recently on ET3 in the mid-1990s.

An English version of the film was released on VHS in Australia by Wizard Video. This version was not a full English dub, but instead retained the original Japanese dialogue while providing an English voiceover that summarized the events of each scene. It featured music by Tangerine Dream, Asia, and Rush. Scenes relating to Japan's involvement in the war were also removed, and the character Wataru Mikumo was renamed "Robert Manning". This English cut was only 90 minutes long, compared to the original Japanese version's length of 125 minutes long, and the German cut's length of 115 minutes.

From 30 to 31 March 2018, Sony Interactive Entertainment Japan Asia distributed Future War 198X through PlayStation Video in Japan only, marking the first and only time the film had been officially distributed in a digital format.

== Reception ==
Matteowatz, reviewing Future War 198X in an article about it in Animétudes, described the film as "pretty bad". His criticism particularly centered on the film's supposed stance that, per Watanabe, "there are no good guys"—which he noted was not true, with the film instead presenting the United States as ultimately saving the world from a crisis started by the Soviet Union. He also noted the film placed a significant focus on Japan and the country's military capabilities, with a Japanese protagonist ultimately saving humanity, placing the Japanese perspective at the forefront.

Sean O'Mara, writing in Zimmerit, criticized the film as being "drawn-out" and "ugly". He greatly criticized the anti-war theming as "tacked on" and "unconvincing", arguing the ending sent the message that nuclear war can be won and that "as much as war sucks, having the best technology is still the most important thing". He also compared the film to the stronger anti-war messages of 1983's WarGames and The Day After, describing Future War 198X in comparison as "exploitive; reveling in the imagery of the war without much consideration for the potential outcome." However, he did praise Ohrai's artwork for the film, but still argued it was "befitting of a much more interesting film".

anime-games.co.uk noted Ohrai's artwork did not accurately reflect the content of the film, which they described as "mostly talking" and lacking much footage of the effects of the nuclear exchange or the actual war itself. They greatly criticized the film's ending as drastically downplaying the effects of global nuclear war (Earth and the survivors recover unusually quickly, and all of humanity bonds together for peace), describing it as "completely implausable and undercut[ting] the drama of everything that came before it".

Reviewing the English version of the film, Vintagecoats criticized the unusual narration style, sound design, and rock music score as detracting from the dramatic experience and "drain[ing] all the potential color from the world of this film".

Anime historian David Merrill was quoted as describing Future War 198X as "a big, tedious sludge of a picture".

== Novelization ==
A novelization of Future War 198X was published by Jitsugyo no Nihon Sha in 1982, written by Masataka Iwano, who also worked on the film as a planning coordinator.
