= Daikanbu Nagurikomi =

1969 film directed by Toshio Masuda

- Film poster
- Directed by: Toshio Masuda
- Screenplay by: Gorō Tanada
- Starring: Tetsuya Watari; Mitsuo Hamada; Tatsuya Fuji
- Cinematography: Kōtarō Takamura
- Edited by: Shin'ya Inoue
- Music by: Harumi Ibe
- Production company: Nikkatsu
- Distributed by: Nikkatsu
- Release date: August 23, 1969 (Japan)
- Running time: 95 minutes
- Country: Japan
- Language: Japanese

Daikanbu Nagurikomi (Japanese: 大幹部 殴り込み), also known as The Fatal Raid in English, is a 1969 Japanese yakuza action film directed by Toshio Masuda. It stars Tetsuya Watari.

== Plot ==
Tetsu Kazama, a senior member of the Nishio clan (Yakuza clan) kills Yoshie, the head of the hostile yakuza clan. When Tetsu is released from prison, he learns that Nishio clan has dissolved and Nishio clan's old territory is now controlled by the Hirata clan.

== Cast ==
- Tetsuya Watari as Tetsu Kazama
- Mitsuo Hamada as Toshio
- Tatsuya Fuji as Kōkichi Nodera
- Isao Sasaki as Jiro
- Yoshirō Aoki as Kaneo Yoshioka
- Kaneko Iwasaki as Yōko Nishioka
- Rie Yokoyama as Keiko
- Isao Bito as Mamoru
- Toru Abe as Nishio
- Nobuo Kaneko as Hirata

== Theme song ==
- Kōya no Akai Hana : Tetsuya Watari
