= Season of the Sun =

1955 novella by Shintaro Ishihara

- 1956 edition cover
- Author: Shintaro Ishihara
- Original title: 太陽の季節
- Language: Japanese
- Publication date: 1955
- Publication place: Japan
- Media type: Print

Season of the Sun (太陽の季節, Taiyō no Kisetsu; published in English as Season of Violence) is a Japanese novella written in 1955 by Shintaro Ishihara, who later became a politician and was governor of Tokyo for 13 years from 1999 to 2012. It is the source of the name of the rebellious taiyōzoku (太陽族) youth culture which emerged after World War II. The novella won the 1956 Akutagawa Prize.

In 2012, it inspired the name of Ishihara's short-lived national political party, the Sunrise Party (Taiyō no Tō).

== Plot ==
Tatsuya Tsugawa, a college student who enjoys boxing, meets Eiko when he and his friends pick up some girls. Tatsuya and Eiko start casually dating, and he finds himself emotionally attracted to her, declaring his love by poking a hole through a shoji screen with his penis. Eiko, who is "determined to take from men and give nothing in return", reacts to his love with reticence. One night, while sailing on Tatsuya's boat, the couple makes passionate love, awakening Eiko's feelings for him. After this, Eiko becomes devoted to Tatsuya, resulting in her being jealous of his other casual relationships. Tatsuya starts taking advantage of this to be cruel to her. One day, while sailing with friends, Tatsuya takes the virginity of a university student, while Eiko has sex with Tatsuya's brother, Michihisa. Michihisa informs Tatsuya that he will "take over" Eiko for him because she does not love him anymore, and Tatsuya sells her to him for five thousand yen. When Eiko discovers this arrangement, she pays the money back to Michihisa, as well as three other times when Tatsuya renews it. After a few months, Eiko meets Tatsuya to inform him that she is pregnant with his baby, and he tells her on a whim that it is not a bad idea to have a baby. However, after seeing a newspaper photograph of a boxer holding a baby, he changes his mind and tells her to have an abortion. Because she is already four months pregnant, Eiko has to have a Caesarean operation, and dies four days later from peritonitis. After seeing Eiko's photograph at her funeral, Tatsuya interprets her smile as a challenge and angrily throws a container of incense at it. He then goes to his college gymnasium to box and recalls Eiko asking: "why can't you love me in a more straightforward manner?".

== Adaptations ==
Adaptations of the work include:

- Season of the Sun (1956 film)
- Taiyō no Kiseki: Kiken na Seishun, a 1986 animated film
- Taiyō no Kisetsu, a 2002 TV miniseries
- Shouji Ch**ko Man no Kisetsu, a 2011 eroge
