= Seiji Yokoyama =

Japanese composer (1935–2017)

- Born: 横山 菁児; March 17, 1935; Hiroshima, Japan
- Died: July 8, 2017 (aged 82) Sera, Japan
- Genres: Film score; classical
- Occupations: Composer, arranger, conductor

Seiji Yokoyama (横山 菁児, Yokoyama Seiji; March 17, 1935 – July 8, 2017) was a Japanese incidental music composer from Hiroshima. He graduated from the Kunitachi College of Music in 1957. Yokoyama is best known for his work on the anime series Saint Seiya and Space Pirate Captain Harlock, and for his symphonic sound for many television programs. In 1992, he won the JASRAC award for his work on Saint Seiya. On July 8, 2017, Yokoyama died from pneumonia at age 82.

== Notable works ==
=== Tokusatsu ===
- Koseidon (1978–1979)
- Megaloman (1979)
- Metalder (1987–1988)
- Winspector (1990–1991)
- Ohranger (1995–1996)

=== Anime ===
==== TV series ====
- The New Adventures of Hutch the Honeybee (1974)
- Ginguiser (1977)
- Space Pirate Captain Harlock (1978–1979)
- Armored Fleet Dairugger XV (1982–1983)
- Ikkiman (1986)
- Saint Seiya (1986–1989)
- Magical Taruruto (1990–1992)
- World Fairy Tale Series (1995)

==== Films ====
- Dracula: Sovereign of the Damned (1980)
- Haguregumo (1982)
- Shōnen Miyamoto Musashi (1982)
- Future War 198X (1982)
- The Snow Country Prince (1985)
- Saint Seiya films (1987–2004)
- Magical Taruruto films (1991–1992)
- Sangōkushi trilogy (1992–1994)
- GeGeGe no Kitarō: Explosive Japan!! (2008)

==== OVAs ====
Series

- The Human Revolution (1995–2004)
- Saint Seiya: Hades (2002–2008)

Single episode

- Aoi Umi to Shōnen (1983)
- Shōnen to Sakura (1983)
- The Princess and the Moon (1984)
- Panzer World Galient: Crest of Iron (1986)
- Xanadu: The Legend of Dragon Slayer (1987)
- Rainbow Across the Pacific Ocean (1990)
- Kanta and the Deer (1990)
- Journey to Hiroshima (1994)
- The Two Princes (1996)
- Peace River (1998)
- The Himalayan Kingdom of Light (1999)
- The Prince and the White Horse (2000)
- The Prince and the Coral Sea (2000)
- The Princess of the Desert Kingdom (2001)
- The Treasures of the Desert (2002)
- The Flower and the Phoenix (2004)

=== Image albums ===
- Kaze to Ki no Uta (1980)
