= Dobu (film) =

1954 Japanese film

- Film poster
- Directed by: Kaneto Shindō
- Written by: Kaneto Shindō; Goro Tanada
- Produced by: Kōzaburō Yoshimura
- Starring: Nobuko Otowa; Jūkichi Uno; Taiji Tonoyama
- Cinematography: Takeo Itō
- Edited by: Zenju Imaizumi
- Music by: Akira Ifukube
- Production company: Kindai Eiga Kyōkai
- Distributed by: Shintoho
- Release date: 27 July 1954 (Japan)
- Running time: 111 minutes
- Country: Japan
- Language: Japanese

Dobu (Japanese: どぶ; lit. The Ditch) is a 1954 Japanese drama film directed by Kaneto Shindō and starring Nobuko Otowa.

== Plot ==
Toku shares a shack in a shanty village in Kawasaki with his friend Pin-chan. On his way to the steel factory where he works, Toku meets an exhausted, starving woman, Tsuru, whom he reluctantly gives some of his food. The factory is on strike, but instead of joining the unionists, who are attacked by strikebreakers, he spends his little money at the bicycle races. After returning home to his shack, he discovers that Tsuru followed him. The two men try to get rid of the seemingly disturbed woman, but let her stay after she gives them her money. Tsuru tells the people of the village her story: An expatriate from Manchuria, she lost her textile factory job due to a strike, then was robbed of her severance pay, raped, and sold to a brothel in Tsuchiura, from which she escaped with a friend from Kawasaki.

Toku and Pin-chan sell Tsuru to a local brothel, run by the landlord on whose territory the shanty town stands, telling the gullible woman that Pin-cha needs the money for his education. Due to Tsuru's whimsical behaviour, the landlord throws her out and demands his money back, plus compensation for broken goods. Tsuru earns the money by working as a street prostitute outside the train station. After a fight (and possible rape attempt), Pin-chan throws Tsuru out of his shack. Back at the station, the other prostitutes try to beat Tsuru up. She fends them off with a stolen policeman's revolver and is finally shot dead by the police. At her wake, a letter of Tsuru is read aloud, in which she encourages the villagers to resist the landlord who wants to turn the territory into a motorcycle racetrack. Toku and Pin-chan mourn her death, admitting their guilt in her fate.

== Cast ==
- Nobuko Otowa as Tsuru
- Jūkichi Uno as Pin-chan
- Taiji Tonoyama as Toku
- Mutsuhiko Tsurumaru as Nishimura
- Ichiro Sugai as Landlord
- Tsutomu Shimomoto as Sugimura
- Sō Yamamura as Businessman
- Noriko Matsuyama as Asako
- Mayuri Mokusho as Hiromi
- Hiroshi Kondo as Teruaki
- Yoshi Katō as Doctor
- Kinzō Shin as Tadashi

== Reception ==
In his 1959 book The Japanese Film – Art & Industry, film historian Donald Richie, though critical of the film's sentimentality, pointed out that the "images had a strength that made one remember them", comparing Dobu to Vittorio De Sica's Miracle in Milan. In an essay published shortly after Shindō's death in 2012, film scholar Alexander Jacoby described Dobu as "a searing account of urban poverty".

== Legacy ==
Dobu was screened at a 2012 retrospective on Shindō and Kōzaburō Yoshimura in London, organised by the British Film Institute and the Japan Foundation.
