= Onibaba (film) =

1964 Japanese horror film by Kaneto Shindō

- Original film poster

Japanese name
- Kanji: 鬼婆
- Hiragana: おにばば
- Katakana: オニババ
- Directed by: Kaneto Shindō
- Screenplay by: Kaneto Shindō
- Produced by: Toshio Konya
- Starring: Nobuko Otowa; Jitsuko Yoshimura; Kei Satō; Taiji Tonoyama
- Cinematography: Kiyomi Kuroda
- Edited by: Toshio Enoki
- Music by: Hikaru Hayashi
- Production companies: Kindai Eiga Kyokai; Tokyo Eiga
- Distributed by: Toho
- Release date: 21 November 1964 (Japan)
- Running time: 102 minutes
- Country: Japan
- Language: Japanese
- Budget: ¥25–40 million

Onibaba (Japanese: 鬼婆; lit. "Demon Hag"; also released as The Hole) is a 1964 Japanese period horror film written and directed by Kaneto Shindō. Set during a civil war in medieval Japan, it stars Nobuko Otowa and Jitsuko Yoshimura as two women who kill soldiers to steal their armor and possessions for survival, while Kei Satō plays the man who ultimately comes between them.

== Plot ==
The film is set near Kyoto, in the mid-14th century, at the beginning of the Nanboku-chō period.

Two fleeing soldiers are ambushed in a field of tall reeds (identified by Shindo as susuki grass) and murdered by an older woman and her young daughter-in-law. The women strip the dead of their armor and weapons and drop the bodies into a deep pit hidden in the field. The next day they trade the loot to a merchant named Ushi for food. Ushi tells them the war is driving people across the country to desperation. He also propositions the older woman. She rebuffs him.

A neighbor named Hachi returns from the war. He had been drafted along with Kishi, the older woman's son and the younger woman's husband. Hachi tells the women that the two of them deserted and that Kishi was killed when they were caught stealing food from farmers. The older woman blames Hachi for her son's death and warns the younger woman to stay away from him.

Despite the warning, the younger woman is seduced by Hachi and begins sneaking out to his hut every night. The older woman learns of the affair and is both angry and jealous. She tries to seduce Hachi herself. He coldly rebuffs her, so she pleads with him not to take her daughter-in-law away, since she cannot kill and rob passing soldiers without her help.

One night, while Hachi and the younger woman are together, a lost samurai wearing a hannya mask forces the older woman to guide him out of the field. He claims to wear the mask to protect his handsome face. She tricks him into plunging to his death in the pit. Then she climbs down and, with great difficulty, pulls off his mask, revealing a horribly disfigured face.

The older woman puts on the samurai's robes and mask and blocks the younger woman's path at night, frightening her into running home. By day she insists the demon was real and sent to punish the affair. The younger woman stays away from Hachi during the day but still tries to reach him after dark. During a storm the older woman frightens her again. This time Hachi, tired of being ignored, finds the younger woman and has sex with her in the grass as her mother-in-law watches. Back at his hut, Hachi finds another deserter stealing his food. The man grabs a spear and kills him.

After the rain, the older woman cannot remove the mask. She confesses her scheme and begs her daughter-in-law for help, and the younger woman agrees once the older woman promises not to interfere with her and Hachi. Pulling does not work, so the younger woman breaks the mask with a mallet. Underneath, the older woman's face is now disfigured like the samurai's. The younger woman, convinced her mother-in-law has become a demon, flees; the older woman runs after her, crying that she is a human being, not a demon. The younger woman leaps over the pit. The older woman leaps after her, and the film ends.

== Production ==
=== Writing and casting ===
| Actor | Role |
|---|---|
| Nobuko Otowa | Older Woman |
| Jitsuko Yoshimura | Younger Woman |
| Kei Satō | Hachi |
| Taiji Tonoyama | Ushi |
| Jūkichi Uno | Demon-Masked Samurai |

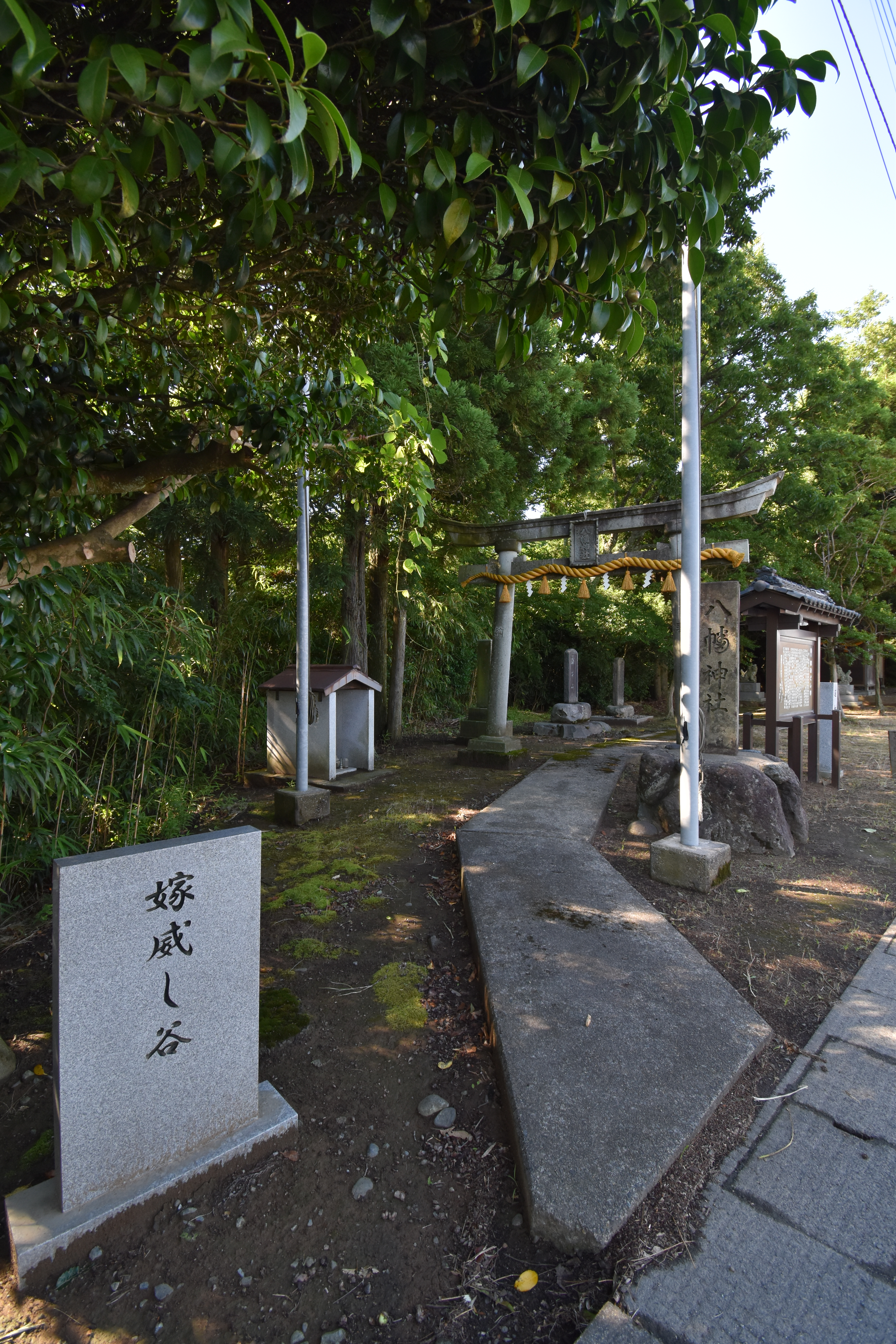
Hachiman shrine at Yomeodoshidani ("bride-scaring valley") in Awara, Fukui Prefecture, known for the legend of the mask

Onibaba was inspired by the Shin Buddhist parable of yome-odoshi-no men (嫁おどしの面; bride-scaring mask) or niku-zuki-no-men (肉付きの面; "flesh-fused" or "flesh-bound" mask), in which a mother-in-law, resenting her daughter-in-law's nightly visits to a temple to hear Buddhist sermons, puts on a demon mask to frighten her on the road. As punishment, the mask sticks fast, and when it finally comes away, it takes the skin of her face with it. The tale is associated with Rennyo, who preached at Yoshizaki in Echizen Province from 1471 to 1475. In the version told by Higashi Hongan-ji, set among Rennyo's followers, the mother-in-law repents and recites the nembutsu, and the mask falls away. Two temples in Yoshizaki, Gankei-ji and Yoshizaki-ji, each keep a mask said to be the one from the story.

In a 2003 interview for the Criterion Collection, Shindo said that the mask's effect on its wearer symbolizes the disfigurement of victims of the atomic bombings of Hiroshima and Nagasaki, and that the film reflects the trauma the bombings left on postwar Japanese society.

Most of the cast consisted of members of Shindo's regular group of performers, Nobuko Otowa, Kei Satō, Taiji Tonoyama, and Jūkichi Uno. This was Jitsuko Yoshimura's only appearance in a Shindo film. The two women do not have names even in the script, but are merely described as "middle-aged woman" and "young woman".

=== Filming ===
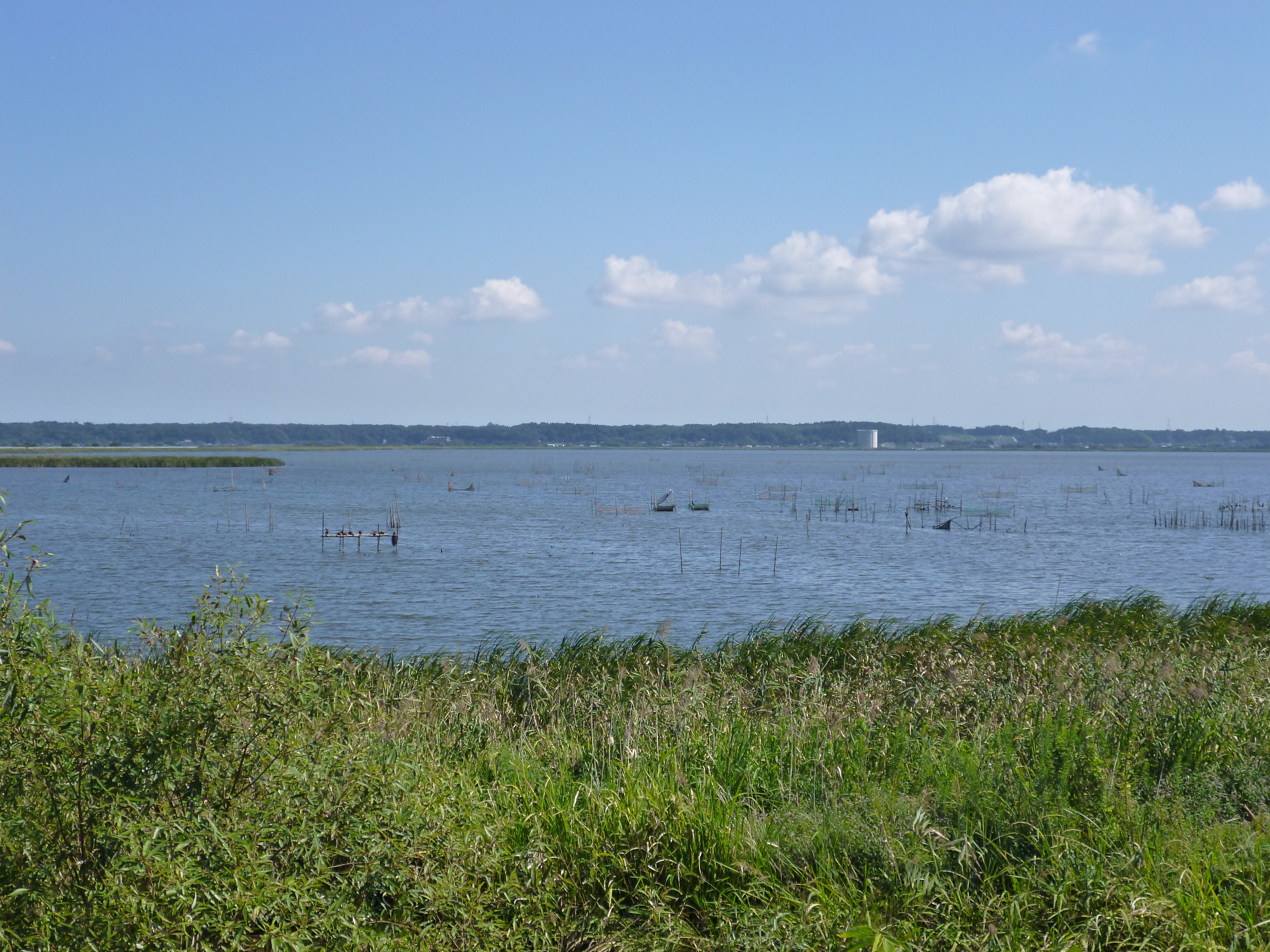
The film was shot at Lake Inba in Chiba Prefecture, Japan

In a 2003 interview for the Criterion Collection, Kaneto Shindo said he wanted to film Onibaba in a field of susuki grass, and sent assistant directors to find a location. Once a location was found near a river bank at Lake Inba (Inba-numa) in Chiba Prefecture, they put up prefabricated buildings to live in. Filming started on 30 June 1964, and continued for three months. To keep the crew cool and entertained during the hard, isolated shoot, Shindo built a makeshift water slide; on-set footage shows a turtle sliding down it. The crew lived and did their laundry in the prefabricated buildings, and the footage also shows them sharing meals such as onigiri and soba noodles.

They had a rule that if somebody left they would not get any pay, to keep the crew motivated to continue. Shindo included dramatized scenes of the dissatisfaction on the set as part of the 2000 film By Player.

To film night scenes inside the huts, they would put up screens to block the sun, and changing the shot would require setting the screens in a completely different spot.

A makeshift tower where crew members could climb to look down and film using crane shots was built. The tower was tall enough to get a look around the entire field.

The film contains some sequences filmed in slow motion.

The scenes of the older woman descending into the hole had to be shot using an artificial "hole" built above ground with scaffolding, since holes dug in the ground at the location site would immediately fill with water.

=== Score ===
Onibaba's score is by Shindo's long-term collaborator Hikaru Hayashi. The background and title music consists of taiko drumming combined with jazz.

== Release ==
Onibaba was released in Japan on 21 November 1964, where it was distributed by Toho. The film was released in the United States by Toho International with English subtitles on 4 February 1965. An English-dubbed version was produced by Toho, but any actual release of it is undetermined. In the United Kingdom, the BBFC rejected the film on its first submission, in August 1965, and passed it in a heavily edited form in June 1968.

=== Home media ===
It was released as a Region 1 DVD on 16 March 2004, in the Criterion Collection. In the United Kingdom, Tartan Video released it on home video in 1994. Eureka Entertainment later released it as part of its Masters of Cinema series on DVD in 2005 and on Blu-ray on 25 February 2013. Criterion released a Blu-ray on 5 October 2021, using the same master as the Eureka Blu-ray.

== Reception ==
Among contemporary reviews, the Monthly Film Bulletin said that Shindo "obviously likes to milk his situations for all they are worth—and then some". It found that the film shared the "striking surface" of his Ningen and The Naked Island, along with their "tendency to fall apart if examined too closely". The review praised Kuroda's "fine photography" and the opening scenes among the reeds, but felt that little else in the film matched them.

Variety called Otowa "superb as the older woman" and praised Yoshimura's "excellent characterization" as the daughter-in-law. It found the film "sometimes high adventure and exciting, at other times dull in its so-called symbolism", and too often "a potpourri of ravenous eating and blatant sex".

A. H. Weiler of The New York Times wrote that Shindo relied on raw qualities "neither new nor especially inventive", and that Western viewers would find his "exotic, sometimes grotesque" rustic characters hard to relate to. He praised Kiyomi Kuroda's "cloudy, low-key photography" and Hikaru Hayashi's "properly weird" score, but concluded that "it is simply sex that is the most impressive of the hungers depicted here".

Peter Bradshaw in The Guardian, writing in 2010, commented: "Onibaba is a chilling movie, a waking nightmare shot in icy monochrome, and filmed in a colossal and eerily beautiful wilderness." Jonathan Rosenbaum of The Chicago Reader described it as "creepy, interesting, and visually striking".

On review aggregator website Rotten Tomatoes, Onibaba received an approval rating of 94% based on 17 modern reviews, and an average rating of 7.20 out of 10.

== Themes ==
The film's title comes from a second source: the legend of Kurozuka, a cannibalistic, monstrous elderly demon woman (i.e., "hag") of Adachigahara. Zvika Serper reads the women's killings as a human version of the hag's cannibalism. The pit full of soldiers' bodies, he writes, recalls the corpses hidden in the back room of her hut. Shindo himself wrote in his production notes that the script retold neither the Adachigahara legend nor the mask story. He meant instead to depict "the vitality of the common people's weed that has no name". In an interview with Joan Mellen published in 1975, Shindo described Onibaba as a jidai-geki about the lower classes rather than the usual lords and samurai, and said the tall susuki grass stood for high society, hiding the poor from the eyes of the powerful.

Set during the civil war at the start of the Nanboku-chō period, Onibaba keeps the fighting offscreen. Hachi describes generals who start petty power struggles and send conscripts into pointless battles, and the women's isolated life in the reeds becomes a small-scale picture of war's disregard for human life.

Critics have linked the film to the atomic bombing of Hiroshima, Shindo's home city. Pau Pascual Galbis describes it as a trauma film and likens the older woman's scarred face to a hibakusha. Devrim Çetin Güven suggests the film is Shindo's critique of his own earlier atomic-bomb films.

With origins from Buddhist themes, the film is evocative of the Third Age of Buddhism (Japanese: Mappo) which in Heian Era depictions, spoke of how demons from Hell sent forth by the infernal King Enma to be unleashed upon the earth, and hunt eagerly for sinners, degenerates, and non-believers to throw into eternal damnation.

== Genre classification ==
Critics are divided on the film's genre. While Onibaba is regarded as a "period drama" by David Robinson, or "stage drama" by Japanese film scholar Keiko I. McDonald, Phil Hardy included it in his genre compendium as a horror film, and Chuck Stephens describes it as an erotic-horror classic. Writing for Sight & Sound, Michael Brooke noted that "Onibaba's lasting greatness and undimmed potency lie in the fact that it works both as an unnervingly blunt horror film (and how!) and as a far more nuanced but nonetheless universal social critique that can easily be applied to any parallel situation".

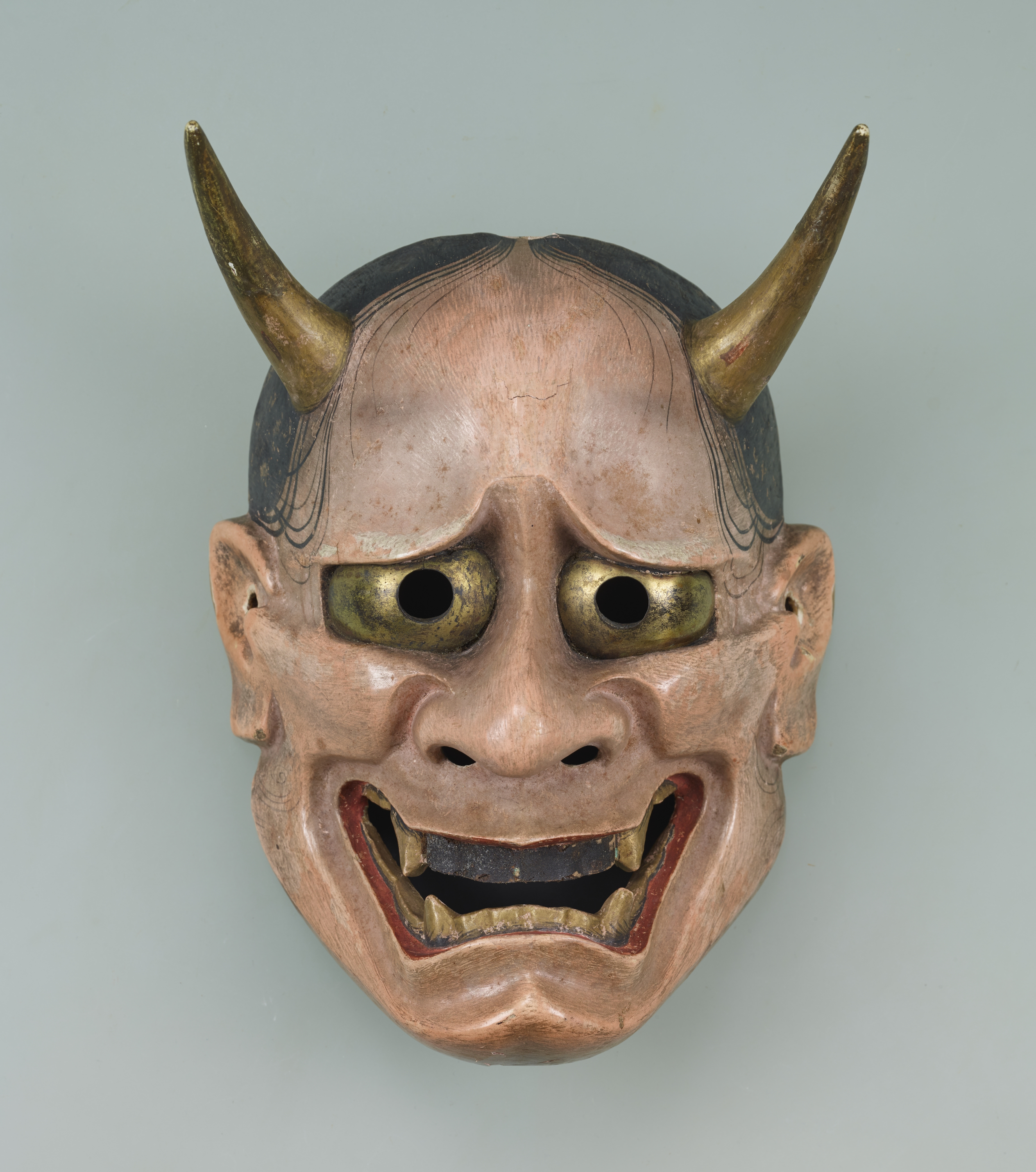
Hannya Noh mask, Edo period (17th–18th century), Tokyo National Museum

Keiko I. McDonald stated that the film contained elements of the Noh theater. She notes that the han'nya mask "is used to demonize the sinful emotions of jealousy and its associative emotions" in Noh plays, and that the differing camera angles at which the mask is filmed in Onibaba are similar to the way in which a Noh performer uses the angle of the mask to indicate emotions. Other reviewers also speculate about Noh influences on the film.

== Legacy ==
Onibaba was screened at a 2012 retrospective on Shindō and Kōzaburō Yoshimura in London, organized by the British Film Institute and the Japan Foundation.

Willem Dafoe, a professed admirer of the film, has stated that he wanted to remake Onibaba, and indeed acquired the rights for a time, but ultimately felt that any contemporary spin he might put on it would "ruin" the source material. In 2026, Natasha Kermani released The Dreadful, which reimagines the story in 15th-century England during the Wars of the Roses.

William Friedkin cited Onibaba as "one of the most terrifying films I've ever seen", and an influence on The Exorcist.

American poet Christopher Kondrich references the film in his poem "I Side with Myself. I Touch My Face."

A character in Guillermo del Toro's 2013 film Pacific Rim is named Onibaba. He said of Onibaba and another Shindo film, Kuroneko, "They did some serious damage to my psyche. Both are perfect fables rooted in Japanese folklore but distinctly modern in their approach to violence and sexuality," calling Onibaba an "essential Japanese horror film with stark B&W cinematography." The game designer Hideo Kojima is also a fan of the film.

== See also ==
- Onibaba (folklore)
