= Lost Sex =

1966 Japanese film

- Theatrical release poster
- Directed by: Kaneto Shindō
- Written by: Kaneto Shindō
- Produced by: Kazuo Kuwahara; Kaneto Shindō
- Starring: Hideo Kanze; Nobuko Otowa
- Cinematography: Kiyomi Kuroda
- Edited by: Hisao Enoki
- Music by: Hikaru Hayashi
- Production company: Kindai Eiga Kyōkai
- Distributed by: Shochiku
- Release date: 27 August 1966 (Japan)
- Running time: 103 minutes
- Country: Japan
- Language: Japanese

Lost Sex (Japanese: 本能, Hepburn: Honno; lit. "Instinct") is a 1966 Japanese drama film written and directed by Kaneto Shindō.

== Cast ==
- Hideo Kanze as the master
- Nobuko Otowa as the housemaid
- Eimei Esumi as young man in the village
- Daigo Kusano as young man in the village
- Nobuko Miyamoto as young girl
- Yoshinobu Ogawa as neighbor / son
- Kaori Shima as neighbor / son's wife
- Taiji Tonoyama as Gonpachi
- Eijirō Tōno as neighbor / writer
- Jūkichi Uno as doctor
