= Heat Wave Island =

1969 Japanese film

- Theatrical release poster
- かげろう
- Directed by: Kaneto Shindō
- Screenplay by: Kaneto Shindō; Isao Seki
- Produced by: Hisao Itoya; Setsuo Noto; Kazuo Kuwahara
- Starring: Nobuko Otowa; Juzo Itami; Rokkō Toura
- Cinematography: Kiyomi Kuroda
- Edited by: Hisao Enoki
- Music by: Hikaru Hayashi
- Production company: Kindai Eiga Kyōkai
- Distributed by: Shochiku
- Release date: 29 October 1969 (Japan)
- Running time: 103 minutes
- Country: Japan
- Language: Japanese

Heat Wave Island (Japanese: かげろう, Hepburn: Kagerō; lit. "Heat Haze") is a 1969 Japanese drama film directed by Kaneto Shindō.

== Cast ==
- Nobuko Otowa as Otoyo
- Juzo Itami as Iino
- Rokkō Toura as Oishi
- Daigo Kusano as Tsuchida
- Taiji Tonoyama as mayor
- Masako Toyama as Goto Michiko
- Ken Yoshizawa as Hiroshi Hori
- Ichirō Sugai as fisherman
- Eitarō Ozawa as hospital director
- Jūkichi Uno as Yo's father

== Reception ==
Heat Wave Island reached number four on Kinema Junpo's Ten Best Japanese Films of 1969.
