= Sanka (film) =

1972 Japanese film

- Film poster
- 讃歌
- Directed by: Kaneto Shindō
- Written by: Kaneto Shindō (screenplay); Jun'ichirō Tanizaki (story)
- Produced by: Kaneto Shindō; Kinshirō Kuzui; Manabu Akashi
- Starring: Tokuko Watanabe; Jiro Kawarazaki; Nobuko Otowa
- Cinematography: Kiyomi Kuroda
- Edited by: Mitsuo Kondo
- Music by: Hikaru Hayashi
- Production companies: Kindai Eiga Kyōkai; Art Theatre Guild
- Distributed by: Art Theatre Guild
- Release date: 29 December 1972 (Japan)
- Running time: 112 minutes
- Country: Japan
- Language: Japanese

Sanka (Japanese: 讃歌; lit. Song of Praise), also known as Hymn, is a 1972 Japanese drama film written and directed by Kaneto Shindō. It is based on the story Shunkinshō by Jun'ichirō Tanizaki.

== Plot ==
A writer tracks down the graves of Shunkin Mozuya and Sasuke Nukui, and learns that an elderly woman visits them once or twice every year. He locates the woman, Teru, a former chambermaid of the Mozuyas, in a retirement home. Teru is reluctant at first, but after the writer hands her a book Sasuke had written on Shunkin's life and promises to pay her, she eventually tells him the story of Shunkin and Sasuke in a series of flashback sequences.

Shunkin is the daughter of the wealthy Mozuya family living in Doshomachi, Osaka. At the early age of 9, she loses her eyesight, and dedicates her life to study playing the shamisen and the koto. Sasuke, an apprentice to the Mozuyas, admires Shunkin and even starts learning to play the shamisen secretly. Shunkin not only obtains that Sasuke becomes her personal apprentice (a position held before by Teru), but also the permission to teach him the shamisen when he is off duty. Sasuke, who, among other tasks, washes and feeds Shunkin and even cleans her when she goes to the toilet, is sometimes treated cruelly by her, but he remains loyal and submissive. When Shunkin becomes pregnant, both she and Sasuke deny that he is the father. The family, fearing for their reputation, order Teru to give the newborn away.

Although notorious for her arrogance and her temper, Shunkin gathers more and more shamisen students around her. One night, an intruder (possibly a rejected admirer) pours boiling water on the sleeping Shunkin, scarring her right cheek. Shunkin insists that she doesn't want Sasuke to see her scarred face, so Sasuke blinds himself with a needle to convince Shunkin to keep him as her apprentice. Shunkin has two more babies, who are also given away to foster families, as she and Sasuke want their total devotion to each other undisturbed by children.

Back in the present, the writer asks Teru, who learned playing the shamisen from Sasuke, to perform one of Shunkin's compositions. After he agrees to pay her more money, she plays one of Shunkin's songs for him, surrounded by the home's residents.

== Cast ==
- Tokuko Watanabe as Shunkin
- Jiro Kawarazaki as Sasuke
- Nobuko Otowa as Teru
- Daijirō Harada as Ritarō
- Taiji Tonoyama as Harumatsu
- Rokkō Toura as Clerk
- Kaneto Shindō as The writer
- Tetsuji Takechi as The father
- Kotoe Hatsui as The mother

== Literary source ==
Tanizaki's 1933 story Shunkinshō has been adapted for film and television numerous times, the first time by Yasujiro Shimazu in 1935 (as Shunkinshō: Okoto to Sasuke), and later by Katsumi Nishikawa (as Shunkinshō).

== Release ==
Sanka was released in Japanese cinemas on 29 December 1972. It was later released on DVD in Japan in 2012 and again in 2019.

== Reception ==
Film scholar Alexander Jacoby saw in Shindō's adaptation of Sanka an attempt to "reflect the layered narration of the literary original", unlike the more straightforward versions by Shimazu and Nishikawa. Eric Cazdyn read the "song of praise" of the film's title "not necessarily one for Sasuke and Shunkin; rather, it is Shindo's song for Tanizaki".
