= Ichiro Sugai =

Japanese actor (1907–1973)

Ichirō Sugai
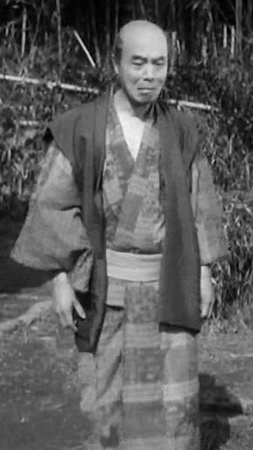
- Sugai in The Life of Oharu
- Born: 25 July 1907; Kyoto, Japan
- Died: 11 August 1973 (aged 66)
- Occupations: Actor, film director
- Years active: 1927-1971

Ichirō Sugai (菅井一郎, Sugai Ichirō; 25 July 1907 – 11 August 1973) was a Japanese actor and film director who appeared in more than 300 films in his 45 years spanning career, working with directors such as Kaneto Shindō, Kenji Mizoguchi and Kōzaburō Yoshimura.

== Biography ==
Sugai was born in Rukahara (now Higashiyama Ward), Kyoto. He left junior high school prematurely and entered the Kyoto section of the Nikkatsu film company in 1925. In the 1930s, he first switched to Shinkō Kinema before founding the actors group Dai-ichi kyōdan and becoming a freelance actor in 1939. Notable films of this era include Kenji Mizoguchi's The Water Magician (1933) and The Straits of Love and Hate (1937). After World War II, Sugai became a sought after supporting actor. In addition to numerous films by directors Shindō, Mizoguchi and Yoshimura, he appeared in films by Akira Kurosawa, Keisuke Kinoshita, Tadashi Imai, Shōhei Imamura and Yasujirō Ozu.

Sugai directed two films himself, Dorodarake no seishun (1954) and Furanki no uchūjin (1957).

== Selected filmography ==
- The Water Magician (1933)
- The Straits of Love and Hate (1937)
- Spring on Leper's Island (1940)
- Sanshiro Sugata (1943)
- The Most Beautiful (1944)
- Sanshiro Sugata Part II (1945)
- Minshū no Teki (1946)
- Aru yo no Tonosama (1946)
- Apostasy (1948)
- Stray Dog (1949)
- Flame of My Love (1949)
- Story of a Beloved Wife (1951)
- Early Summer (1951)
- Avalanche (1952)
- The Life of Oharu (1952)
- Epitome (1953)
- A Geisha (1953)
- Life of a Woman (1953)
- Sansho the Bailiff (1954)
- The Crucified Lovers (1954)
- Wolf (1955)
- Shirogane Shinjū (1956)
- Ryūri no Kishi (1956)
- Night Drum (1958)
- Endless Desire (1958)
- Odd Obsession (1959)
- Kenju burai-chō Nukiuchino Ryu (1960)
- Blood Is Dry (1960)
- Black Test Car (1962)
- The Long Death (1964)
- The Pornographers (1966)
- Gamera vs. Barugon (1966)
- The Yoshiwara Story (1968)
- Daimon Otokode Shinitai (1969)
- Chōkōsō no Akebono (1969)
- Heat Wave Island (1969)
- Yakuza's Law: Yakuza Keibatsushi: Rinchi (1969)
