= Burakkubōdo =

1986 Japanese film

- Film poster
- Directed by: Kaneto Shindō
- Written by: Kaneto Shindō
- Produced by: Dokichi Takashima; Masaya Endo; Jirō Shindō
- Starring: Nobuko Otowa; Taiji Tonoyama
- Cinematography: Yoshiyuki Miyake
- Edited by: Mitsuo Kondo
- Music by: Hikaru Hayashi
- Production company: Regional Culture Promotion Association
- Distributed by: Kindai Eiga Kyōkai
- Release date: 17 September 1986 (Japan)
- Running time: 110 minutes
- Country: Japan
- Language: Japanese

Burakkubōdo (Japanese: ブラックボード), (Note: The film's original title "ブラックボード" (romanised "Burakkubōdo") is a Japanese loanword of the English "Blackboard".) also known as Black Board, is a 1986 Japanese drama film written and directed by Kaneto Shindō.

== Plot ==
Takeshi Yasui, a junior high school student, is found dead in the river. The police investigate it as a murder related to bullying. The dead boy turns out to have been murdered by two of his schoolmates, who he had been bullying.

== Cast ==
- Terutake Tsuji as Takeshi Yasui
- Ichirō Zaitsu as the school principal
- Nobuko Otowa as Yasui's mother
- Taiji Tonoyama as the bird watcher
