= The Heart (1973 film) =

1973 Japanese film

- Film poster
- 心
- Directed by: Kaneto Shindō
- Written by: Kaneto Shindō (screenplay); Natsume Sōseki (novel)
- Produced by: Kaneto Shindō; Kinshirō Kuzui
- Starring: Noboru Matsuhashi; Kazunaga Tsuji; Nobuko Otowa
- Cinematography: Kiyomi Kuroda
- Edited by: Mitsuo Kondo
- Music by: Hikaru Hayashi
- Production companies: Kindai Eiga Kyokai; Art Theatre Guild
- Distributed by: Art Theatre Guild
- Release date: 27 October 1973 (Japan)
- Running time: 90 minutes
- Country: Japan
- Language: Japanese

The Heart (Japanese: 心, Hepburn: Kokoro), also titled Love Betrayed, is a 1973 Japanese drama film written and directed by Kaneto Shindō. It is based on the 1914 novel Kokoro by Natsume Sōseki.

== Cast ==
- Noboru Matsuhashi as K
- Kazunaga Tsuji as S
- Nobuko Otowa as Mrs. M.
- Anri as I-ko
- Taiji Tonoyama as Father of S
- Yasuo Arakawa as Boy
- Sotomi Kotake as Girl

== Literary source ==
Sōseki's novel has been adapted for film and television numerous times, the first time for cinema by Kon Ichikawa in 1955 as The Heart. For his version, writer/director Shindō moved the story's Meiji era setting to the 1970s and put his focus only on the novel's third and final part, "Sensei to isho" ("Sensei's testament").

== Reception ==
While Louis Frédéric ranked The Heart among Shindō's important films, Max Tessier criticised Shindō's "leaden directing" and "heavy-handed psychology".
