= Akuto =

1965 Japanese film

Akutō
- Original Japanese film poster
- Directed by: Kaneto Shindō
- Screenplay by: Kaneto Shindō
- Based on: Kaoyo by Jun'ichirō Tanizaki
- Produced by: Toshio Itoya; Setsuo Noto; Tamotsu Minato; Kazuo Kuwahara
- Starring: Nobuko Otowa; Kyōko Kishida; Eitaro Ozawa
- Cinematography: Kiyomi Kuroda
- Edited by: Toshio Enoki
- Music by: Hikaru Hayashi
- Production companies: Tokyo Eiga; Kindai Eiga Kyōkai
- Distributed by: Toho
- Release date: 21 November 1965 (Japan)
- Running time: 119 minutes
- Country: Japan
- Language: Japanese

Akuto (Japanese: 悪党, Hepburn: Akutō; lit. "Villain" (Note: Akutō can refer to a villain in general, or to someone who opposed the shogunate during the Kamakura and Muromachi period.)), released in the United States as Conquest, is a 1965 Japanese jidaigeki drama film written and directed by Kaneto Shindō. It is based on the play Kaoyo by Jun'ichirō Tanizaki.

== Plot ==
In the 14th century, Kō no Moronao, a deputy and retainer of the Ashikaga shogunate, hears of the beauty of Kaoyo, the wife of samurai Takasada of the Shioji clan. Obsessed with the thought of sleeping with Kaoyo, he instructs his chief chambermaid Jiju to arrange for a tête-à-tête. Jiju has letters in Moronao's name sent to Kaoyo, which first remain unanswered. Afraid to lose her position, Jiju sneaks into Takasada's house and tries to talk Kaoyo into giving in to the deputy's courting. Jiju is caught, confronted with Takasada's and Kaoyo's unconditional love and loyalty for each other. Moronao, furious about the woman's repeated resistance, orders Takasada to join the battles between the Northern and Southern dynasties to have him out of the way. The disobedient Takasada and his followers desert to meet with his wife at a secret place, where he is surrounded by Moronao's men. Takasada and his followers die in the subsequent battle, and Kaoyo has herself killed by family member Munemura. The victorious warriors and Jiju return to Moronao's estate, presenting him with Kaoyo's severed head. Moronao is furious because he wanted her alive, not dead. Jiju starts laughing, and the severed head smiles.

== Cast ==
- Nobuko Otowa as Jiju
- Kyōko Kishida as Kaoyo
- Eitaro Ozawa as Kō no Moronao
- Isao Kimura as Enya Takasada
- Kentaro Kaji as Rokuro
- Taiji Tonoyama as Munemura
- Jūkichi Uno as Yoshida Kenko, the poet
