= Tree Without Leaves =

1986 Japanese film

- Japanese film poster
- Directed by: Kaneto Shindō
- Written by: Kaneto Shindō
- Produced by: Masaya Endo; Setsuo Noto; Michiyoshi Takashima
- Starring: Keiju Kobayashi; Nobuko Otowa; Ichirō Zaitsu
- Cinematography: Yoshiyuki Miyake
- Edited by: Mitsuo Kondō
- Music by: Hikaru Hayashi
- Production company: Kindai Eiga Kyokai
- Release date: 15 November 1986 (Japan)
- Running time: 105 minutes
- Country: Japan
- Language: Japanese

Tree Without Leaves (Japanese: 落葉樹, Hepburn: Rakuyōju; lit. "Deciduous Tree") is a 1986 Japanese autobiographical drama film written and directed by Kaneto Shindō.

== Plot ==
Haru, an aged scriptwriter living alone in a house in the mountains, reminiscences his childhood in Hiroshima Prefecture.

The youngest child of four, Haru grows up as the son of a wealthy landowner. His passive father serves as a guarantor of someone else's debts, and slowly loses the family's fortune. Haru's older brother confronts the father for his inactivity, even threatening him with a knife during a violent dispute. Unable to change the father's mind, the brother leaves the house and joins the police force.

The old Haru is paid a visit by a woman who delivers food to his remote residence. She discovers his draft for a novel, asking if he stopped writing screenplays. Haru replies that he is too old and, being the last surviving member of the family, wants to keep his mother's memory alive.

The oldest sister of the young Haru accepts the marriage proposal of an émigré whom she does not love, on the condition that he pays 2,000 yen to help pay the family's debts. Still, neither her dowry nor the younger sister's leaving for the city can prevent the bankruptcy. After selling the estate, Haru and his parents move into the warehouse, while the main house is demolished to sell the usable parts.

Eventually, the mother dies. Back in the present, the old Haru hears his mother's voice, calling him for supper, a reminder of the opening scene.

== Cast ==
- Keiju Kobayashi – Old Haru
- Nobuko Otowa – Mother
- Ichiro Zaitsu – Father
- Midori Sono – Older sister
- Shiori Wakaba (as Shiori Suwano) – Younger sister
- Shinsuke Kawamichi – Older brother
- Kazuki Yamanaka – Young Haru
- Taiji Tonoyama – Sakuzo
- Meiko Kaji – Woman who comes to the mountain
- Rokkō Toura – Bailiff

== Background ==
Already in his 1984 film The Horizon (地平線), Shindō had chronicled the fate of his older sister, who married a Japanese-American émigré whom she followed to the U.S.

The house in the mountains where the old Harun lives was director Shindō's actual mountain retreat, and is the same building as in A Last Note.

== Reception ==
Reviewer Ben Sachs of the Chicago Reader regarded Tree Without Leaves as a "clinically observant work about a terminally detached person", whose methods eventually "cumulate to powerful effect".
