= Avalanche (1952 film) =

1952 Japanese film

- Directed by: Kaneto Shindō
- Written by: Kaneto Shindō
- Starring: Susumu Fujita; Nobuko Otowa; Mitsuko Mito
- Cinematography: Yasukazu Takemura
- Production company: Daiei Film
- Distributed by: Daiei Film
- Release date: 5 March 1952 (Japan)
- Running time: 78 minutes
- Country: Japan
- Language: Japanese

Avalanche (Japanese: 雪崩, Hepburn: Nadare) is a 1952 Japanese drama film written and directed by Kaneto Shindō.

== Cast ==
- Susumu Fujita as Kōsuke Kijima
- Nobuko Otowa as Atsuko Fujikawa
- Mitsuko Mito as Tokie Kijima
- Ichirō Sugai as Manager
- Taiji Tonoyama as Miyabayashi
- Saburō Date as Tomita
