= Kuroneko =

1968 Japanese horror film by Kaneto Shindō

- Theatrical release poster
- Directed by: Kaneto Shindō
- Screenplay by: Kaneto Shindō
- Produced by: Nichiei Shinsha
- Starring: Kichiemon Nakamura; Nobuko Otowa; Kiwako Taichi
- Cinematography: Kiyomi Kuroda
- Edited by: Hisao Enoki
- Music by: Hikaru Hayashi
- Production companies: Nichiei Shinsha; Kindai Eiga Kyokai
- Distributed by: Toho
- Release date: 24 February 1968 (Japan)
- Running time: 99 minutes
- Country: Japan
- Language: Japanese

Kuroneko (Japanese: 藪の中の黒猫, Hepburn: Yabu no Naka no Kuroneko; lit. "A Black Cat in a Bamboo Grove"; or simply The Black Cat) is a 1968 Japanese jidaigeki horror film directed by Kaneto Shindō, and an adaptation of a supernatural folktale. Set during a civil war in feudal Japan, (Note: Kuroneko takes place during either the Heian period (794–1185) or the Sengoku period (1467–1615).) the film's plot concerns the vengeful spirits, or onryō, of a woman and her daughter-in-law, who are raped and murdered by a band of samurai. It stars Kichiemon Nakamura, Nobuko Otowa, and Kiwako Taichi.

Kuroneko was shot in black-and-white and in TohoScope format, and distributed by Toho. It was not dubbed in English, but was released with subtitles in the United States in 1968.

== Plot ==
Yone and her daughter-in-law Shige, who live in a house in a bamboo grove, are raped and murdered by a troop of samurai, and their house is burned down. A black cat appears, licking at the bodies.

The women return as ghosts with the appearance of fine ladies, who wait at Rajōmon. They find the samurai troop and bring them to an illusory mansion in the bamboo grove where the burnt-out house was. They seduce and then kill the samurai like cats, tearing their throats with their teeth.

Meanwhile, in northern Japan a battle is taking place with the Emishi. A young man, Gintoki, fortuitously kills the enemy general, Kumasunehiko. He brings the severed head to show the governor, Minamoto no Raikō. He says that he fought the general under the name Gintoki. He is made a samurai in acknowledgement of his achievement. When he goes looking for his mother and wife, he finds their house burned down and the women missing.

Raikō tells Gintoki to find and destroy the ghosts who are killing the samurai. Gintoki encounters the two women and realizes that they are Yone, his mother, and Shige, his wife. They have made a pact with the underworld to return and kill samurai in revenge for their deaths. Because Gintoki has become a samurai, by their pact they must kill him, but Shige breaks her pledge to spend seven nights of love with Gintoki. Then, because she has broken the pact, Shige is condemned to the underworld. Reporting on his progress, a mournful Gintoki tells Raikō that he has destroyed one of the ghosts.

Gintoki encounters his spectral mother again at Rajōmon trying to seduce samurai. After seeing her reflection as a ghost in a pool of water, he attacks her with his sword, cutting off her arm, which takes on the appearance of a cat's limb. Gintoki brings the limb to Raikō, claiming it is evidence that he has killed the second ghost. Raikō is pleased and says Gintoki will be remembered as a hero, but first orders him to complete seven days of ritual purification. During the purification, Gintoki is visited by Yone, who claims to be a seer sent by the emperor to ward off evil spirits. She tricks Gintoki into giving her the limb, and then flies through the ceiling and disappears into the sky. Distraught and disheveled, Gintoki staggers through the woods to the cottage where he met the ghosts, and there he collapses. The walls disappear around him, revealing the charred remains of his family home where Shige and Yone were murdered. Snow falls and covers his body as a cat is heard meowing in the distance.

== Cast ==
- Kichiemon Nakamura as Gintoki
- Nobuko Otowa as the Mother
- Kiwako Taichi as Shige
- Kei Satō as Raiko
- Hideo Kanze as the Mikado
- Taiji Tonoyama as the farmer
- Yoshinobu Ogawa as Raiko follower
- Rokko Toura as a warlord

== Release ==
Kuroneko was released theatrically in Japan on February 24, 1968, where it was distributed by Toho. It was released in the United States by Toho International with English subtitles in July 1968.

It was placed in competition at the 1968 Cannes Film Festival, but the festival was cancelled due to the events of May 1968 in France.

It was released on DVD and Blu-Ray by The Criterion Collection on Oct. 18, 2011.

== Reception ==
=== Contemporary reviews ===
Tom Milne of the Monthly Film Bulletin found the film "Much less extravagant than Shindo's earlier excursion into ghostly horrors with Onibaba", and that it was "more of a mood piece." The review concluded that the film "has a sufficiently ingenious story to remain enjoyable throughout, and it sporadically discovers moments of genuinely bizarre invention".

=== Retrospective assessments ===
Manohla Dargis, in a review of the film for The New York Times in 2010, described it as "a ghost story that's more eerie than unnerving, and often hauntingly lovely". The following year, Maitland McDonagh called the film "darkly seductive" and "sleek, hair-raisingly graceful, and ready to take its place alongside the other landmarks of Japanese horror history".

On the review aggregator website Rotten Tomatoes, the film holds an approval rating of 95% based on 22 reviews, with a rating average of 8.1/10.

== Themes ==
Yūsuke Suzumura of Hosei University has speculated that the film's title was deliberately intended to allude to the Ryūnosuke Akutagawa story In a Grove (Yabu no naka in Japanese), as well as Akira Kurosawa's film version of the story. Although the Japanese title literally means "a black cat in a bamboo grove", the phrase yabu no naka in Japanese is also used idiomatically to refer to a mystery that is difficult to unravel. Suzumura also identified the legends of Minamoto no Raikō as an influence on the film: since Raikō himself appears in the film, it is likely that the film's protagonist's name Gintoki (銀時; "silver-time") refers to the name of Raikō's legendary follower Kintoki (金時; "gold-time").

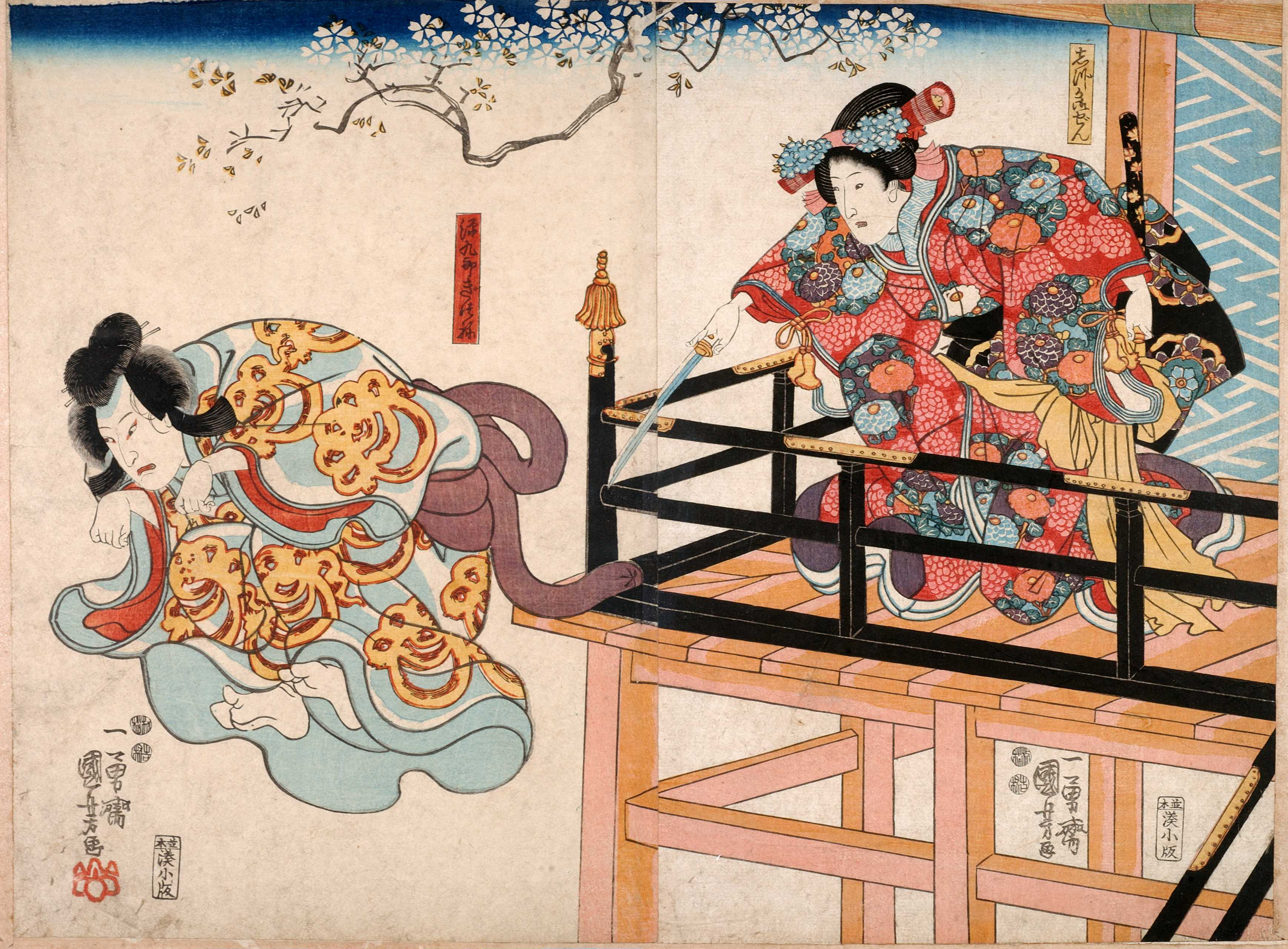
A depiction of the chūnori (riding in mid-air) technique found in kabuki theatre

In an essay about Kuroneko, film critic Maitland McDonagh highlighted the roles cats play in Japanese folklore—particularly the bakeneko, a yōkai (or supernatural entity) thought to have the ability to take the form of a human victim, often eating the victim in the process. Kuroneko is one of a number of Japanese "monster cat" horror films (kaibyō eiga or bake neko mono), a subgenre derived primarily from the repertoire of kabuki theatre.

Other theatrical elements observed in Kuroneko include the film's implementation of spotlights; the use of smoke to create a ghostly atmosphere, which is characteristic of kabuki theatre; the dance movements of the mother's spirit, based on dances in Noh theatre; and the resemblance of the spirits' jumping and flying movements to chūnori, a visual trick used in kabuki theatre in which actors are made to "fly" in mid-air through the use of wires. Additionally, lead actor Kichiemon Nakamura was a kabuki performer, and Hideo Kanze, who played the Mikado in Kuroneko, specialized in Noh theatre.

== Legacy ==
Kuroneko was screened at a 2012 retrospective on Shindō and Kōzaburō Yoshimura in London, organised by the British Film Institute and the Japan Foundation.

== Awards ==
In Japan, the film won two awards from the Mainichi Film Concours. Nobuko Otowa won the award for Best Actress for her work in Kuroneko and Operation Negligee, and Kiyomi Kuroda won the award for Best Cinematography for this and Operation Negligee.
