= Story of a Beloved Wife =

1951 Japanese film

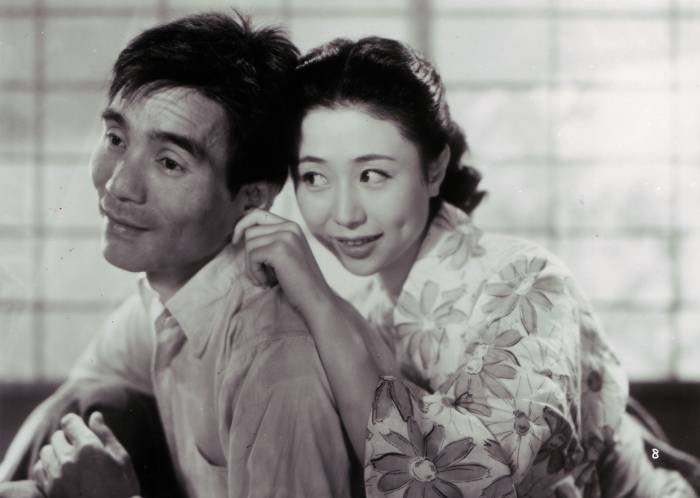
- Jūkichi Uno and Nobuko Otowa
- Directed by: Kaneto Shindō
- Written by: Kaneto Shindō
- Starring: Nobuko Otowa
- Cinematography: Yasukazu Takemura
- Music by: Chūji Kinoshita
- Production company: Daiei Film
- Distributed by: Daiei Film
- Release date: 7 September 1951 (Japan)
- Running time: 97 minutes
- Country: Japan
- Language: Japanese

Story of a Beloved Wife (愛妻物語, Aisai monogatari) is a 1951 Japanese drama film written and directed by Kaneto Shindō. It was Shindō's debut film as a director. The story is a fictionalised account of Shindō's first marriage.

== Plot ==
Numazaki, an aspiring screenwriter, lives as a boarder with a couple and their daughter Takako. When he and Takako become involved romantically, the father demands Numazaki to leave, and tells the daughter not to marry Numazaki because of his insecure line of work. Takako rebels against her father and moves in with Numazaki into a flat of their own. Numazaki's screenplay for film director Sakaguchi is rejected, but Sakaguchi gives him the chance for a rewrite, urging him to study literature to improve his work. While Numazaki is studying and writing, Takako supports him with her jobs. Numazaki's script is finally accepted, but Takako falls fatally ill with tuberculosis. Before she dies, she asks him to write a story about her.

== Cast ==
- Nobuko Otowa as Takako Ishikawa
- Jūkichi Uno as Keita Numazaki
- Ichirō Sugai as Masuda, director of the film studio
- Ryōsuke Kagawa as Kōzō Ishikawa
- Masao Shimizu as Masuda
- Yuriko Hanabusa as Yumie Ishikawa
- Osamu Takizawa as film director Sakaguchi
- Saburō Date as Sakunosuke Ōta

== Reception ==
According to film historians Donald Richie and Joseph L. Anderson, Story of a Beloved Wife was praised by contemporary critics as a contribution to a new realism, but criticised for its sentimentality.
