= Ryūri no Kishi =

1956 Japanese film

Ryūri no kishi
- DVD cover
- Directed by: Kaneto Shindō
- Written by: Kaneto Shindō (screenplay); Yōko Ōta (novel)
- Produced by: Tengo Yamada
- Starring: Mie Kitahara; Nobuko Otowa; Rentarō Mikuni
- Cinematography: Takeo Itō
- Music by: Akira Ifukube
- Production company: Nikkatsu
- Distributed by: Nikkatsu
- Release date: 21 June 1956 (Japan)
- Running time: 101 minutes
- Country: Japan
- Language: Japanese

Ryūri no Kishi (Japanese: 流離の岸; lit. Shore of Wandering) is a 1956 Japanese drama film written and directed by Kaneto Shindō. It is based on the novel of the same name by Yōko Ōta.

== Cast ==
- Mie Kitahara as Chiho Teraoka
- Nobuko Otowa as Hagiyo, Chiho's mother
- Rentarō Mikuni as Ryūkichi Fukase
- Ranko Akagi as Yoshie, Ryūkichi's mother
- Sen Hara as Sama (credited as Senko Hara)
- Nobuo Kaneko as Takakura
- Sachiko Murase as Uta, Chiho's grandmother
- Terumi Niki
- Ichirō Sugai as Sōkichi, Ryūkichi's father
- Yoshiko Tsubouchi as Kuniko (credited as Mieko Tsubouchi)
