= A Soul to Devils =

1971 film

- Film poster
- Directed by: Kō Nakahira
- Written by: Kaneto Shindo
- Produced by: Kō Nakahira
- Starring: Nobuko Tashiro
- Cinematography: Aguri Sugita
- Edited by: Hisao Enoki
- Distributed by: Toho
- Release date: 19 June 1971 (Japan)
- Running time: 107 minutes
- Country: Japan
- Language: Japanese

A Soul to Devils (闇の中の魑魅魍魎, Yami no naka no chimimoryo), also known as Chimimoryo: A Soul of Demons, is a 1971 Japanese drama film directed by Kō Nakahira. It was entered into the 1971 Cannes Film Festival.

== Cast ==
- Nobuko Tashiro as Ikezoe's wife
- Ai Sasaki as Kinu
- Toru Emori as Takeda
- Koji Nambara as Karino
- Taiji Tonoyama as Hachizo
- Kazuko Ineno as Kume
- Mariko Kaga as Tokuhime
- Akaji Maro as Kinzo
- Hiroko Ogi as Yuki
- Eiji Okada as Ikezoe
