= Kaneto Shindo =

Japanese filmmaker (1912–2012)

Kaneto Shindō
- 新藤 兼人
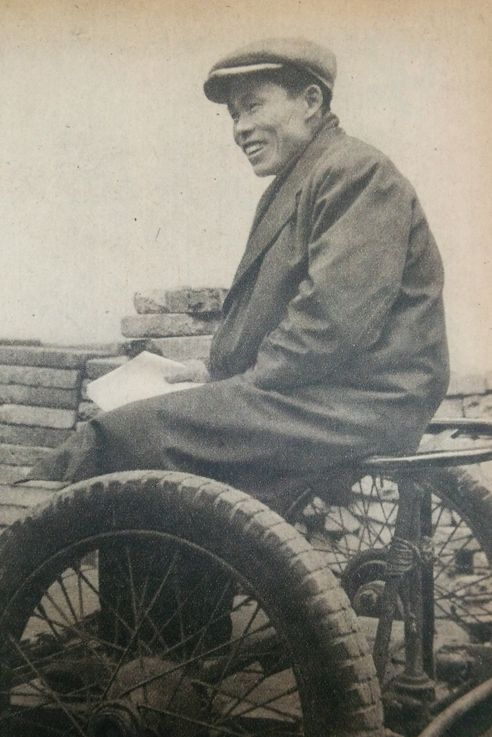
- Born: 22 April 1912; Saeki, Hiroshima Prefecture, Japan
- Died: 29 May 2012 (aged 100); Tokyo, Japan
- Occupations: Film director, screenwriter, film producer, writer
- Spouse(s): Takako Kuji (common-law wife, died 1943) Miyo Shindō (m. 1946; died 1978) Nobuko Otowa (m. 1978; died 1994)
- Children: Jiro Shindō

Kaneto Shindō (新藤 兼人, Shindō Kaneto; 22 April 1912 – 29 May 2012) was a Japanese film director, screenwriter, film producer, and writer, who directed 48 films and wrote scripts for 238. His best known films as a director include Children of Hiroshima, The Naked Island, Onibaba, Kuroneko and A Last Note. His screenplays were filmed by directors such as Kenji Mizoguchi, Kōzaburō Yoshimura, Kon Ichikawa, Keisuke Kinoshita, Seijun Suzuki, and Tadashi Imai.

His films of the first decade were often in a social realist vein, repeatedly depicting the fate of women, while since the seventies, portraits of artists became a speciality. Many of his films were autobiographical, beginning with his 1951 directorial debut, Story of a Beloved Wife, and, being born in Hiroshima Prefecture, he also made several films about the atomic bombing of Hiroshima and the effect of nuclear weapons.

Shindō was one of the pioneers of independent film production in Japan, co-founding his own film company Kindai Eiga Kyōkai with director Yoshimura and actor Taiji Tonoyama in 1950. He continued working as a screenwriter, director, and author until close to his death at the age of 100.

== Biography ==
=== Early life ===
Shindō was born in 1912 in the Saeki District of Hiroshima Prefecture as the youngest of four children. His family were wealthy landowners, but his father went bankrupt and lost all his land after acting as a loan guarantor. His older brother and two sisters went to find work, and he and his mother and father lived in a storehouse. His mother became an agricultural labourer and died during his early childhood. His older brother was good at judo and became a policeman. One of his sisters became a nurse and would go on to work caring for atom bomb victims. The other sister married a Japanese-American and went to live in the US.

In 1933, Shindō, then living with his brother in Onomichi, was inspired by Sadao Yamanaka's film Bangaku No isshō to want to start a career in films. He saved money by working in a bicycle shop and in 1934, with a letter of introduction from his brother to a policeman in Kyoto, he set off for Kyoto. After a long wait, he was able to get a job in the film developing department of Shinkō Kinema, which he joined because he was too short to join the lighting department. He was one of eleven workers in the developing department, but only three of them actually worked, the others being members of the company baseball team. At this time he learned that films were based on scripts because old scripts were used as toilet paper. He would take the scripts home to study them. His job involved drying 200-foot lengths of film on a roller three metres long and two metres high, and he learned the relationship between the pieces of film he was drying and the scripts he read.

When Shinkō Kinema moved from Kyoto to Tokyo in November 1935, many of the staff, who were Kyoto locals, did not want to move. The brother of the policeman who had helped Shindō get the job in Shinkō Kinema was one of them. He asked Shindō to take his place, and Shindō got a job in Shinko Kinema's art department run by Hiroshi Mizutani. For his work as an art director, Shindō trained under a local artist. He had a talent for sketching which he used in scouting locations, since cameras were less often used in those days. Shindō discovered that a lot of people wanted to become film directors, including Mizutani, and he decided that he might have a better chance of success as a screenwriter.

=== Screenwriter years ===
Shindō wrote a lot of film scripts, which were severely criticized by his friends, but he persisted. He submitted a script called Tsuchi o ushinatta hyakushō, about a farmer who loses his land due to the construction of a dam, to a film magazine and won a prize of 100 yen, four times his then monthly salary of 25 yen. However, the script was never filmed.

By the late 1930s he was working as an assistant to Kenji Mizoguchi on several films, most notably as chief assistant director and art director on The 47 Ronin. He submitted scripts to Mizoguchi, only for Mizoguchi to tell him that he "had no talent" for screenwriting, events dramatized years later in Shindō's debut film Story of a Beloved Wife. His first realised screenplay was for the film Nanshin josei in 1940. He was asked to write a script by director Tomu Uchida, but the script was never filmed due to Uchida's untimely military conscription.

In 1942, he joined a Shochiku subsidiary, the Koa Film company under the tutelage of Kenji Mizoguchi. In 1943 he transferred to the Shochiku studio. Later that year, his common-law wife Takako Kuji died of tuberculosis. In April 1944, despite being graded class C in the military physical exam, he was drafted into the navy. The group of 100 men he was serving with were initially assigned to clean buildings. Sixty of the men were selected by lottery to serve on a ship and then died in a submarine attack. Thirty more men were selected by lottery to serve on a submarine and were not heard from again. Four men were selected by lottery to be machine-gunners on freight ships converted to military use, and died in submarine attacks. The remaining six men cleaned the Takarazuka theatre which was then being used by the military, then sent to a camp where they were insulted and beaten.

At the surrender of Japan, Shindō exchanged his uniform for cigarettes and made his way back to the Shochiku film studio at Ōfuna. The studio was deserted, and Shindō spent his time in the script department reading the surviving scripts.

In 1946, with a secure job as a scriptwriter at Shochiku, he married Miyo Shindō via an arranged marriage, and bought a house in Zushi, intending to start a family. At Shochiku, Shindō met director Kōzaburō Yoshimura. According to film historian Donald Richie, this started "one of the most successful film partnerships in the postwar industry, Shindō playing Dudley Nichols to Yoshimura's John Ford." The duo scored a critical hit with A Ball at the Anjo House in 1947. Shindō wrote scripts for almost all of the Shochiku directors except Yasujirō Ozu.

Shindō and Yoshimura were both unhappy at Shochiku, which viewed the two as having a "dark outlook" on life. In 1950 they both left to form an independent production company with actor Taiji Tonoyama, Kindai Eiga Kyokai, which went on to produce most of Shindō's films.

=== Early career as a film director ===
In 1951, Shindō made his debut as a director with the autobiographical Story of a Beloved Wife, starring Nobuko Otowa in the role of his deceased common-law wife Takako Kuji. Otowa became Shindō's mistress (he was married to his second wife at the time), and would go on to play leading roles in almost all of his films during her life. After directing Avalanche in 1952, Shindō was invited by the Japan Teachers' Union to make a film about the dropping of the atomic bomb on Hiroshima. Children of Hiroshima stars Nobuko Otowa as a young teacher who returns to Hiroshima to visit her family's grave and find surviving former students and colleagues. It premiered at the 1953 Cannes Film Festival, being the first Japanese film to deal with the subject of the atomic bomb, which had been forbidden under postwar American censorship. Children of Hiroshima met with acclaim, but also with criticism for its sentimentality and, according to the producing Japan Teachers' Union, for not being political enough.

After this international success, Shindō made Epitome in 1953. Nobuko Otowa is Ginko, a poor girl who must become a geisha in order to support her family, and cannot marry the rich client whom she falls in love with because of his family honor. Film critic Tadao Sato said, Shindō had "inherited from his mentor Mizoguchi his central theme of worship of womanhood...Perhaps it would be more accurate to say that Shindō's view of women blossomed under his master's encouragement, but once in bloom revealed itself to be of a different hue...Shindō differs from Mizoguchi by idealizing the intimidating capacity of Japanese women for sustained work, and contrasting them with shamefully lazy men."

Between 1953 and 1959 Shindō continued to make political films that were social critiques of poverty and women's suffering in present-day Japan. These included Life of a Woman, an adaptation of Maupassant's Une Vie in 1953, and Dobu, a 1954 film about the struggles of unskilled workers and petty thieves that starred Otowa as a tragic prostitute. Wolf (1955), based on an actual event of a money transport robbed by a group of men and women out of sheer desperation, failed due to its extremely limited release. Still, actor Tonoyama later called his role in Wolf his favourite of all of the director's films. In 1959 Shindō made Lucky Dragon No. 5, the true story of a fishing crew irradiated by an atomic bomb test at Bikini Atoll. The film received the Peace Prize at a Czech film festival, but was not a success with either critics or audiences.

By this time Shindō had formed an established "stock company" of actors and crew that he would work with for the majority of his career. These included actors Nobuko Otowa, Taiji Tonoyama and Jūkichi Uno, composer Hikaru Hayashi and cinematographer Kiyomi Kuroda, who had been fired from the Toei studio for his political beliefs during the "red purge" of the early 1950s, and lost a legal battle for reinstatement.

=== International success ===
With Kindai Eiga Kyokai close to bankruptcy, Shindō poured what little financial resources he had left into The Naked Island, a film without dialogue which he described as "a cinematic poem to try and capture the life of human beings struggling like ants against the forces of nature." Nobuko Otowa and Taiji Tonoyama are a couple living on a small island with their two young sons and no water supply. Every day they boat to another island to retrieve fresh water to drink and irrigate their crops. The film saved Shindō's company when it was awarded the Grand Prize at the 2nd Moscow International Film Festival in 1961. Shindō made his first ever trip abroad to attend the Moscow film festival, and he was able to sell the film in sixty-one countries.

After making two more films of social relevance (Ningen in 1962 and Mother in 1963), Shindō shifted his focus as a filmmaker to the individuality of a person, specifically a person's sexual nature. He explained: "Political things such as class consciousness or class struggle or other aspects of social existence really come down to the problem of man alone [...]. I have discovered the powerful, very fundamental force in man which sustains his survival and which can be called sexual energy [...]. My idea of sex is nothing but the expression of the vitality of man, his urge for survival." From these new ideas came Onibaba in 1964.

Onibaba stars Nobuko Otowa and Jitsuko Yoshimura as 14th-century Japanese peasant women living in a reed-filled marshland who survive by killing and robbing defeated samurai. The film won numerous awards and the Grand Prix at the Panama Film Festival, and Best Supporting Actress (Jitsuko Yoshimura) and Best Cinematography (Kiyomi Kuroda) at the Blue Ribbon Awards in 1964.

After the 1965 jidaigeki drama Akuto, based on a play by Jun'ichirō Tanizaki, Shindō continued his exploration of human sexuality with Lost Sex in 1966. In Lost Sex, a middle aged man who has become temporarily impotent after the Hiroshima bombing in 1945, once again loses his virility due to nuclear tests in the Bikini Atoll. In the end, he is cured by his housekeeper. Impotence was again the theme of Shindō's next film, Libido, released in 1967. Gender politics and strong female characters played a strong role in both of these films. Tadao Sato said "By contrasting the comical weakness of the male with the unbridled strength of the female, Shindō seemed to be saying in the 1960s that women had wrought their revenge. This could have been a reflection of postwar society, since it is commonly said in Japan women have become stronger because men have lost all confidence in their masculinity due to Japan's defeat."

In 1968 Shindō made Kuroneko, a horror period film reminiscent of Onibaba. The film centers around a vengeful mother and daughter-in-law pair played by Nobuko Otowa and Kiwako Taichi. After being raped and left to die in their burning hut by a group of soldiers, the pair return as demons who entice samurai into a bamboo grove, where they are killed. The film won the Mainichi Film Awards for Best Actress (Otowa) and Best Cinematography (Kiyomi Kuroda) in 1968.

Shindō also made the comedy Strong Women, Weak Men in 1968. A mother and her teenage daughter leave their impoverished coal-mining town to become cabaret hostesses in Kyoto. They quickly acquire enough cynical street smarts to get as much money out of their predatory johns as they can. Shindō said of the film, "common people never appear in the pages of history. Silently they live, eat and die [...]. I wanted to depict their bright, healthy, open vitality with a sprinkling of comedy."

In the crime drama Heat Wave Island, released in 1969, Otowa is an Inland Sea island farmer who moves to the mainland and later dies under mysterious circumstances. Live Today, Die Tomorrow! (1970) was based on the true story of spree killer Norio Nagayama, dramatizing not only his crimes but the poverty and cruelty of his upbringing. The film won the Golden Prize at the 7th Moscow International Film Festival in 1971.

Around this time, at the age of sixty, his second wife Miyo divorced him over his continuing relationship with Otowa.

=== Later career ===
From 1972 to 1981, Shindō served as chair of the Writers Guild of Japan. Also in 1972, he directed Sanka about a shamisen player and her submissive apprentice, his second adaptation of a literary source by Jun'ichirō Tanizaki after Akuto.

Shindō's 1974 film My Way was a throwback to films of his early career and an exposure of the Japanese government's mistreatment of the country's migratory workers. Based on a true story, an elderly woman resiliently spends nine months attempting to retrieve her husband's dead body, fighting government bureaucracy and indifference all along the way.

In 1975, Shindō made Kenji Mizoguchi: The Life of a Film Director, a documentary about his mentor who had died in 1956. The film uses film clips, footage of the hospital where the director spent his last days and interviews with actors, technicians and friends to paint a portrait of the director. Shindō also wrote a book on Mizoguchi, published in 1976.

In 1977 The Life of Chikuzan was released, about the life of blind shamisen player Takahashi Chikuzan. It was entered into the 10th Moscow International Film Festival. That same year, Shindō travelled to America to film a television documentary, Document 8.6, about the Hiroshima atomic bomb. He met Paul Tibbets, the pilot of the plane which dropped the bomb, but was not able to interview him on film. The documentary was broadcast in 1978.

In 1978, after the death of his ex-wife, he married Nobuko Otowa.

The domestic drama The Strangling was shown at the 1979 Venice Film Festival, where Nobuko Otowa won the award for Best Actress. Edo Porn, another film based on an artist's biography released in 1981, portrayed the life of the 18th-century Japanese wood engraver Katsushika Hokusai.

In 1984 Shindō made The Horizon, based on the life of his sister. The film chronicles her experiences as a poor farm girl who is sold as a mail-order bride to a Japanese American and never sees her family again. She spends time in an internment camp for Japanese Americans during World War II and lives a life of difficulty and disappointment.

With the 1988 semi-documentary Sakura-tai Chiru, Shindō once again returned to the theme of nuclear weapons and their consequences, following the fate of a theater troupe whose members were killed during the bombing of Hiroshima.

According to his son Jiro, Shindō gave up his hobbies of Mahjong, Shogi, and baseball at the age of eighty to concentrate on film-making. Jiro was the producer of many of his films since the mid-1980s. Kaze Shindō, Jiro's daughter and Shindō's granddaughter, later followed in Shindō's footsteps as a film director and scriptwriter.

During production of Shindō's film A Last Note, Nobuko Otowa was diagnosed with liver cancer. She died in December 1994, prior to the film's 1995 release. A Last Note won numerous awards, including Best Film awards at the Blue Ribbon Awards, Hochi Film Awards, Japan Academy Prizes, Kinema Junpo Awards and Mainichi Film Awards, as well as awards for Best Director at the Japanese Academy, Nikkan Sports Film Awards, Kinema Junpo Awards and Mainichi Film Award.

=== Final films and death ===
After Otowa's death, her role as lead actress in Shindō's films was taken over by Shinobu Otake, who would star in four of his films. In Will to Live (1999), a black comedy on the problems of ageing, Otake played a daughter with bipolar disorder of an elderly father who has fecal incontinence, played by Rentarō Mikuni.

In 2000, at the age of 88, Shindō filmed By Player, a biography of actor and long-time associate Taiji Tonoyama, incorporating aspects of the history of Shindō's film company, Kindai Eiga Kyokai, and using footage of Otowa shot in 1994.

The 2003 Owl, again starring Otake, used as a background the true story of farmers sent back from Japanese colonies in Manchuria to unworkable farmland at the end of the Second World War. The entire film was shot on a single set, partly because of Shindō's mobility problems. It was entered into the 25th Moscow International Film Festival, where Shindō won a special award for his contribution to world cinema.

In 2010, Shindō directed Postcard, a story of middle-aged men drafted for military service at the end of the second world war loosely based on Shindō's own experiences. Postcard was selected as the Japanese submission for the Academy Award for Best Foreign Language Film, but did not make the January shortlist. Due to failing health, Shindō announced that it would be his last film at its premiere at the Tokyo International Film Festival.

For the last forty years of his life, Shindō lived in a small apartment in Akasaka. After the death of Nobuko Otowa, he lived alone. Although he had been able to walk all over Tokyo in his eighties, he lost mobility in his legs in his nineties. Because of his need for care, Kaze Shindō moved into his apartment and lived with him for the last six years of his life, acting as his caregiver. Kaze Shindō appears in the credits for Shindō's later films credited as "Kantoku kenkō kanri", "Management of director's health".

From April to May 2012 a committee in the city of Hiroshima presented a tribute to Shindō to commemorate his 100th birthday. This event included screenings of most of his films and special guests such as Shindō himself and longtime admirer Benicio del Toro.

Shindō died of natural causes on 29 May 2012. According to his son Jiro, he was talking in his sleep about new film projects even at the end of his life. He requested that his ashes be scattered on the Sukune island in Mihara where The Naked Island was filmed, and where half of Nobuko Otowa's ashes were also scattered.

== Style and themes ==
Shindō said that he saw film "as an art of 'montage' which consists of a dialectic or interaction between the movement and the nonmovement of the image." Although criticized for having little visual style early in his career, he was praised by film critic Joan Mellen who called Onibaba "visually exquisite."

The strongest and most apparent themes in Shindō's work (who described himself as a "socialist") involve social criticism of poverty, women and sexuality. Tadao Sato has pointed out that Shindō's political films are both a reflection of his impoverished childhood and the condition of Japan after World War II, stating that, "Contemporary Japan has developed from an agricultural into an industrial country. Many agricultural people moved to cities and threw themselves into new precarious lives. Kaneto Shindo's style of camerawork comes from this intention to conquer such uneasiness by depicting the perseverance and persistence of farmers."

Joan Mellen wrote that "at their best, Shindo's films involve a merging of the sexual with the social. His radical perception isolates man's sexual life in the context of his role as a member of a specific social class...For Shindo our passions as biological beings and our ambitions as members of social classes, which give specific and distorted form to those drives, induce an endless struggle within the unconscious. Those moments in his films when this warfare is visualized and brought to conscious life raise his work to the level of the highest art."

== Influences ==
In a 1972 interview with Joan Mellen, Shindō named Orson Welles and Sergei Eisenstein as the Western directors he admired the most, calling them "the best", and Mizoguchi as the most admired director of the older Japanese generation. In the same interview, he confirmed "a strong Freudian influence" throughout all of his work.

When asked by Benicio del Toro what the most important thing he had learned from Kenji Mizoguchi was, Shindō replied that the most important thing he had learned from Mizoguchi was never to give up. According to Shindō, although Mizoguchi made more than eighty films, most of them were boring, with only about five or six good films, but without the failures there would never have been successes like Ugetsu Monogatari.

== Legacy ==
A retrospective on Shindō and Kōzaburō Yoshimura was held in London in 2012, organised by the British Film Institute and the Japan Foundation.

== Awards ==
- 1961 Grand Prize at the 2nd Moscow International Film Festival for The Naked Island.
- 1964 Grand Prix at the Panama Film Festival for Onibaba.
- 1971 Golden Prize at the 7th Moscow International Film Festival for Live Today, Die Tomorrow!
- 1996 Japan Academy Prize for Director of the Year for A Last Note
- 1998 Person of Cultural Merit.
- 1999 Golden St. George at the 21st Moscow International Film Festival for Will to Live
- 2002 Order of Culture.
- 2003 Japan Academy Lifetime Achievement Award.

== Filmography ==
=== Director ===
Shindō wrote or co-wrote the scripts for all the films he directed. He is also credited as art director for Ningen, Onibaba, and Owl.

- 1951 – Story of a Beloved Wife (愛妻物語)
- 1952 – Avalanche 雪崩
- 1952 – Children of Hiroshima (原爆の子)
- 1953 – Epitome (縮図)
- 1953 – Life of a Woman (女の一生)
- 1954 – The Ditch (どぶ)
- 1955 – The Wolves (狼)
- 1956 – Shirogane Shinjū (銀心中)
- 1956 – Ryūri no Kishi (流離の岸)
- 1956 – An Actress (女優)
- 1957 – Umi no yarodomo (海の野郎ども)
- 1958 – Sorrow Is Only for Women (悲しみは女だけに)
- 1959 – Lucky Dragon No. 5 (第五福竜丸)
- 1959 – Hanayome-san wa sekai-ichi (花嫁さんは世界一)
- 1960 – The Naked Island (裸の島)
- 1962 – Ningen (人間)
- 1963 – Mother (母)
- 1964 – Onibaba (鬼婆)
- 1965 – Akutō (悪党)
- 1966 – Lost Sex (本能)
- 1967 – Libido (性の起原)
- 1968 – Kuroneko (藪の中の黒猫)
- 1968 – Strong Women, Weak Men (強虫女と弱虫男)
- 1969 – Heat Wave Island (かげろう)
- 1970 – Strange Affinity (触角, Shokkaku)
- 1970 – Live Today, Die Tomorrow! (裸の十九才)
- 1972 – Kanawa (鉄輪（かなわ）)
- 1972 – Sanka 讃歌
- 1973 – The Heart (心)
- 1974 – My Way (わが道)
- 1975 – Kenji Mizoguchi: The Life of a Film Director (ある映画監督の生涯 溝口健二の記録)
- 1977 – The Life of Chikuzan (竹山ひとり旅)
- 1978 – Document 8 6 (ドキュメント8.6) (documentary)
- 1979 – The Strangling (絞殺)
- 1981 – Edo Porn (Hokusai manga (北斎漫画))
- 1984 – The Horizon (地平線)
- 1986 – Burakkubōdo ブラックボード
- 1986 – Tree Without Leaves 落葉樹
- 1988 – Sakura-tai Chiru (さくら隊散る)
- 1992 – The Strange Story of Oyuki (濹東綺譚)
- 1995 – A Last Note (午後の遺言状)
- 1999 – Will to Live (生きたい)
- 2000 – By Player (三文役者)
- 2003 – Owl (ふくろう)
- 2008 – Teacher and Three Children 石内尋常高等小学校 花は散れども
- 2010 – Postcard (一枚のハガキ)

=== Screenwriter (selected) ===
Not including films he also directed

- 1947 – Kekkon
- 1947 – A Ball at the Anjo House
- 1948 – Yuwaku
- 1949 – Waga koi wa moenu
- 1951 – Dancing Girl
- 1951 – The Tale of Genji
- 1956 – Akō Rōshi: Ten no Maki, Chi no Maki
- 1961 – Akō Rōshi
- 1962 – Kurotokage
- 1962 – The Graceful Brute
- 1964 – Manji
- 1966 – Zatoichi's Pilgrimage
- 1966 – Fighting Elegy
- 1971 – Battle of Okinawa
- 1971 – Yami no naka no chimimoryo
- 1972 – Under the Flag of the Rising Sun
- 1972 – Rica (混血児リカ)
- 1973 – Rica 2: Lonely Wanderer (混血児リカ ひとりゆくさすらい旅)
- 1973 – Rica 3: Juvenile's Lullaby (混血児リカ ハマぐれ子守唄)
- 1978 – The Incident
- 1979 – Akō Rōshi TV series
- 1987 – Hachiko Monogatari
- 1999 – The Geisha House

== Writings ==
(In Japanese except where noted otherwise)

- Shindo, Kaneto (27 April 1976). Aru Eiga Kantoku - Mizoguchi Kenji to Nihon Eiga [A film director - Kenji Mizoguchi and the Japanese cinema]. Iwanami Shinsho (in Japanese). Vol. 962. Iwanami. ISBN 4-00-414080-3. – a biography and recollection of Kenji Mizoguchi
- Shindo, Kaneto (January 1978). Eizō Hitori Tabi - eiga "Chikuzan hitori tabi" sōzō no kiroku [A film journey - a record of the making of "The Life of Chikuzan"] (in Japanese). Miraisha.
- Shindo, Kaneto (2000). Sanmon yakusha no shi: Seiden Tonoyama Taiji [The death of a third-rate actor: a true biography of Taiji Tonoyama] (in Japanese). ISBN 978-4-00-602017-0.
- Shindo, Kaneto (21 July 2004). Shinario Jinsei [A life in scriptwriting]. Iwanami Shinsho (in Japanese). Vol. 902. Iwanami. ISBN 4-00-430902-6. – a collection of essays about scriptwriting
- Shindo, Kaneto (2006). Sakugekijutsu [Dramaturgy].
- Shindo, Kaneto (2007). Shinario No Kōsei [The structure of a film script].
- Shindo, Kaneto (2008). Ikite iru kagiri Watashi no Rirekisho [While I live: my resume] (in Japanese). Nihon Keizai Shimbunsha. ISBN 978-4-532-16661-8. – a collection of newspaper articles reprinted as a book
- Shindo, Kaneto (2012). Nagase, Hiroko (ed.). 100 sai no ryugi [The Centenarian's Way] (in Japanese). PHP. ISBN 978-4-569-80434-7. a collection of essays.
