= By Player =

2000 Japanese film

- Film poster
- 三文役者
- Directed by: Kaneto Shindō
- Screenplay by: Kaneto Shindō
- Based on: Sanmon yakusha no shi by Kaneto Shindō
- Produced by: Jiro Shindō
- Starring: Naoto Takenaka; Nobuko Otowa
- Cinematography: Yoshiyuki Miyake
- Edited by: Yukio Watanabe
- Music by: Hikaru Hayashi
- Production company: Kindai Eiga Kyokai
- Distributed by: Kindai Eiga Kyokai; Tokyo Teatoru
- Release date: 2 December 2000 (Japan)
- Running time: 126 minutes
- Country: Japan
- Language: Japanese

By Player (Japanese: 三文役者, Hepburn: Sanmon Yakusha; lit. "Third-Rate Actor") is a 2000 Japanese biographical film directed by Kaneto Shindō based on the life of actor Taiji Tonoyama.

The film is a series of vignettes from Taiji Tonoyama's life and film clips, interspersed with a dialogue to camera by Nobuko Otowa, addressing the camera as if she is addressing Tonoyama himself, recollecting events in his life. The film focuses on Tonoyama's alcohol dependence and his various sexual relationships, as well as his film work with Shindo.

== Plot ==
The first part of the film shows Tonoyama talking to a waitress, Kimie, in a coffee shop. He then meets her father and asks him for permission to marry Kimie. The father asks him to first divorce his existing wife, Asako. In fact he is not married to Asako. To prevent him marrying Kimie, Asako then registers them as married.

The film moves through various episodes of Tonoyama making films with director Kaneto Shindō. At the time of The Naked Island, Tonoyama is close to death from alcohol poisoning, and is saved only by there not being anywhere to buy drinks. During the filming of Ningen and Onibaba, he repeatedly sneaks off to get drunk with actors Kei Satō and Kei Yamamoto. Director Shindō (played by himself) is seen as a distant, lonely figure, doing odd things such as burning driftwood in the rain or trying to catch fish in a pond where no fish are present.

Tonoyama moves in with Kimie. He explains to Kimie that he cannot have children due to a venereal disease caught from a prostitute. She adopts a son, Yasuo, her brother's child. Tonoyama goes to visit the other woman, whom he refers to as "Kamakura no baba" (the old woman in Kamakura) who has also adopted a daughter.

Tonoyama has repeated episodes of drinking or sex. Tonoyama, in order to avoid neighbourhood gossips, pretends to be going to work.

== Cast ==
Although the story goes from Tonoyama's thirties to his death in his seventies, he and his two "wives" are played by the same people from start to finish. The various children in the film are played by different actors as they age.

- Naoto Takenaka as Taiji Tonoyama
- Hideko Yoshida as Asako
- Keiko Oginome as Kimie
- Nobuko Otowa as herself
- Kaneto Shindō as himself
- Yasuhito Hida as Kei Satō
- Kagetora Miura as Kei Yamamoto

== Production ==
Nobuko Otowa's dialogue to camera was recorded six years before the rest of the film was made, before Otowa's death in 1994.

The film uses Tonoyama's life story to tell the story of Shindō's production company, Kindai Eiga Kyokai. Although it is based on Tonoyama's life, the dramatized scenes from Tonoyama's life are not based on witness accounts, but only on how Shindō imagined them. The film is based on Shindō's biography of Tonoyama.

== Film title ==
The English title of the film, By Player (the Japanese pronunciation of which can be romanized as Bai Pureiyā), is an English-like Japanese term (wasei-eigo) meaning "character actor."
