= An Actress =

1956 Japanese film

- Theatrical release poster
- Directed by: Kaneto Shindō
- Written by: Kaneto Shindō (screenplay); Kakuko Mori (book)
- Produced by: Hisao Itoya; Tengo Yamada; Setsuo Noto
- Starring: Nobuko Otowa; Chikako Hosokawa; Eitarō Ozawa
- Cinematography: Yoshio Miyajima
- Music by: Akira Ifukube
- Production company: Kindai Eiga Kyōkai
- Distributed by: Shintoho
- Release date: 27 November 1956 (Japan)
- Running time: 104 minutes
- Country: Japan
- Language: Japanese

An Actress (Japanese: 女優, Hepburn: Joyū) is a 1956 Japanese drama film written and directed by Kaneto Shindō. It is based on the autobiography of actress Kakuko Mori.

== Cast ==
- Nobuko Otowa as Kakuko Mori
- Chikako Hosokawa as Tsukiko, Kakuko's mother
- Shinsuke Ashida as Shinichirō Yagi
- Sen Hara as Chiyo, Akio's mother
- Sumiko Hidaka as Yugiku Yoshiya
- Tanie Kitabayashi
- Kei Taguchi as Tabata
- Taketoshi Naitō as Akio Satomi
- Eitarō Ozawa as Tarō Fujie (credited as Sakae Ozawa)
- Zenpei Saga as Sugisaburō
- Koreya Senda as Yasuda
- Ichirō Shimizu as Kunijirō Matsukawa
- Taiji Tonoyama
- Eijirō Tōno as Tadao Inoue
- Jūkichi Uno as Toshirō Yamashita
