= The Naked Island =

- Home video cover art by Eureka Entertainment
- Directed by: Kaneto Shindō
- Written by: Kaneto Shindō
- Produced by: Kaneto Shindō; Matsuura Eisaku
- Starring: Nobuko Otowa; Taiji Tonoyama; Shinji Tanaka; Masanori Horimoto
- Cinematography: Kiyomi Kuroda
- Edited by: Toshio Enoki
- Music by: Hikaru Hayashi
- Production company: Kindai Eiga Kyokai
- Release date: November 23, 1960
- Running time: 96 minutes
- Country: Japan
- Language: Japanese (minimal dialog)

The Naked Island (Japanese: 裸の島, romanized: Hadaka no Shima) is a Japanese black-and-white film from 1960, directed by Kaneto Shindō. The film is notable for having almost no spoken dialogue.

== Plot ==
The film depicts a small family, a husband and wife and two sons, struggling to get by on the Seto Inland Sea's Sukune Island in Mihara, Hiroshima, over the course of a year. They are the island's only occupants, and survive by farming. They must repeatedly carry fresh water for their plants and themselves in a row boat from a neighboring island.

When the boys catch a large fish, the family travels to Onomichi by ferry, where they sell it to a fishmonger, then eat at a modern restaurant, see a television and travel in a cable car.

Later on, while the parents are away from the island, the older son falls ill. The desperate father runs to find a doctor to come to treat his son, but when they arrive, the boy is already dead. After the boy's funeral, which is attended by his classmates from his school on the neighboring island, the family resumes their hard life, with very limited opportunity for grief.

== Production ==
Director and scriptwriter Kaneto Shindo decided to make this film because he wanted to make a film without any dialogue. The independent production company Kindai Eiga Kyokai was close to bankruptcy at the time this film was made, and Shindo sank his last funds into making the film. The film's financial success saved the company.

The lead actor Taiji Tonoyama was suffering from severe liver disease due to alcohol dependence, but recovered his health because there was no alcohol available near the filming location. These events were later dramatized in Shindo's biopic about Tonoyama, By Player.

In his last published book before he died, Shindo noted that the film's premise of carrying water to the island is false, because the crop shown being watered in the film, sweet potatoes, do not actually need extensive watering.

Shindo deliberately made the actors carry heavily-loaded buckets of water so that the yokes they were using would be seen to bend, symbolizing the harshness of their lives.

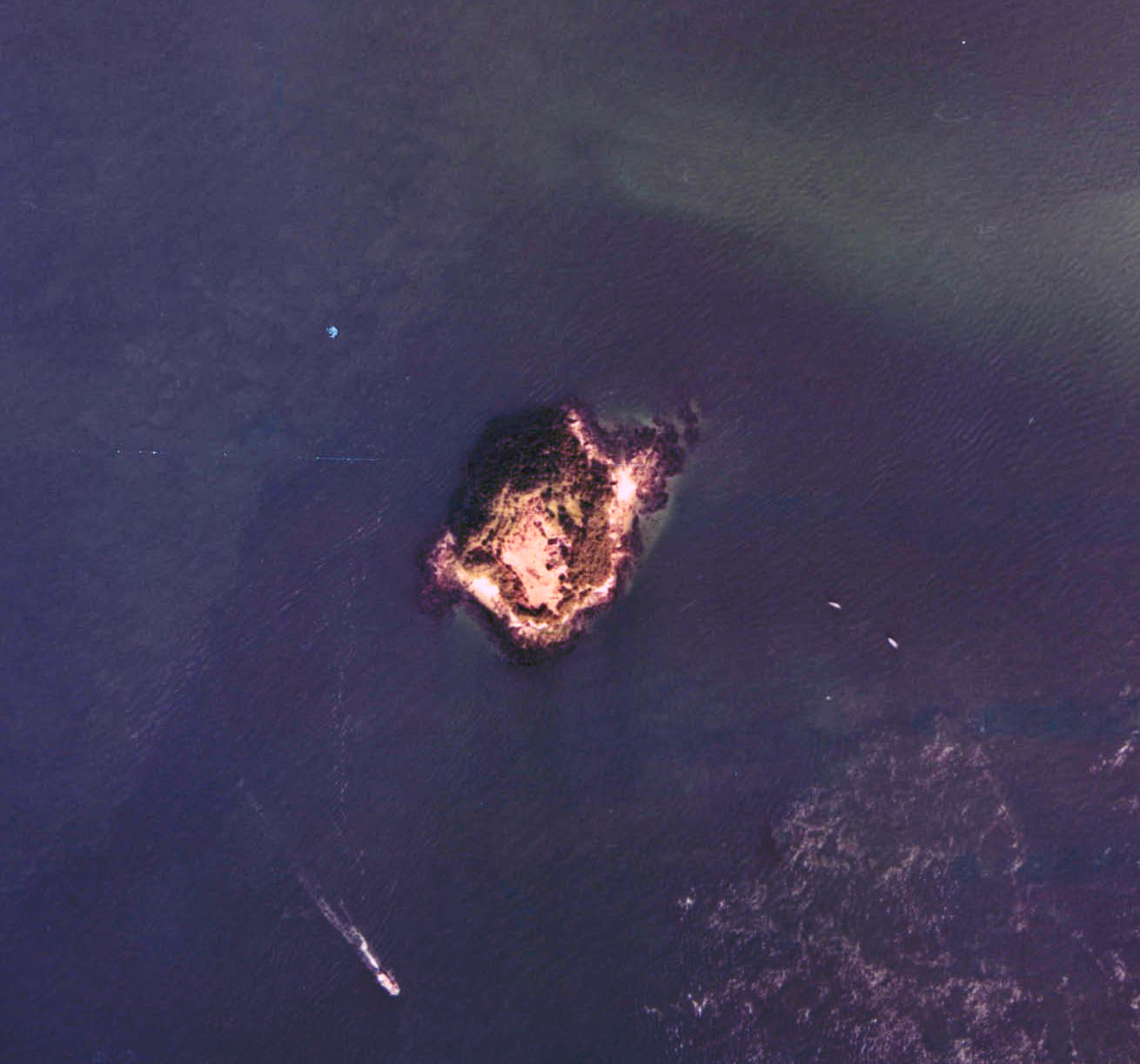
Sukune Island

The island location in the film is an uninhabited island called Sukune off the coast of a larger island called Sagishima, part of Mihara, Hiroshima.

== Music ==
The film's score was written by Hikaru Hayashi and largely consists of variations on a single theme.

Due to the success of the film in France, the main theme was the basis of the song L'Île Nue, written by Eddy Marnay and first interpreted by Jacqueline Danno. An extended play of highlights from the score was also released in France.

== Reception ==
In 1961, the film won the Grand Prix (in a tie with Grigori Chukhrai's Clear Skies) at the 2nd Moscow International Film Festival, at which Luchino Visconti (whose La Terra Trema is an inspiration) was a jury member.

In 1963, the film was nominated for "Best Film from any Source" at the 16th British Academy Film Awards.

Director Nagisa Oshima once critically referred to the film as "the image foreign people hold of the Japanese", but later included it in his documentary 100 Years of Japanese Cinema.

== Legacy ==
The Naked Island was screened at a 2012 retrospective on Shindō and Kōzaburō Yoshimura in London, organised by the British Film Institute and the Japan Foundation.
