= Shirogane Shinjū =

1956 Japanese film

Shirogane Shinjū / Gin Shinjū
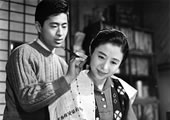
- Directed by: Kaneto Shindō
- Written by: Kaneto Shindō
- Produced by: Tengo Yamada; Hisao Itoya
- Starring: Nobuko Otowa; Hiroyuki Nagato; Jūkichi Uno
- Cinematography: Takeo Ito
- Music by: Akira Ifukube
- Production company: Nikkatsu
- Distributed by: Nikkatsu
- Release date: 5 February 1956 (Japan)
- Running time: 99 minutes
- Country: Japan
- Language: Japanese

Shirogane Shinjū (銀心中; lit. "The silver love-suicides"), also romanised as Gin Shinjū, is a 1956 Japanese drama film written and directed by Kaneto Shindō. It is based on a novel by Torahiko Tamiya.

== Cast ==
- Nobuko Otowa as Sakie / Umeko
- Hiroyuki Nagato as Tamatarō
- Jūkichi Uno as Kiichi
- Chikako Hosokawa as Madame
- Tanie Kitabayashi as Nobuyo
- Akitake Kōno as Yoshizō
- Fukuko Sayo as Kurimoto's wife
- Masami Shimojō
- Ichirō Sugai as Kurimoto
- Harue Tone as Saku
- Taiji Tonoyama as Gensaku
