= The Strangling =

1979 Japanese film

- Film poster
- Directed by: Kaneto Shindō
- Written by: Kaneto Shindō
- Produced by: Kaneto Shindō
- Starring: Kō Nishimura; Nobuko Otowa
- Cinematography: Yoshiyuki Miyake
- Edited by: Shizuko Toshima
- Music by: Hikaru Hayashi
- Production companies: Kindai Eiga Kyōkai; Art Theatre Guild
- Distributed by: Art Theatre Guild
- Release date: 2 June 1979 (Japan)
- Running time: 116 minutes
- Country: Japan
- Language: Japanese

The Strangling (Japanese: 絞殺, Hepburn: Kōsatsu) is a 1979 Japanese drama film written and directed by Kaneto Shindō. It is based on a real-life incident of a father who had strangled his violent son which became known as the "Kaisei High School Murder Case".

== Cast ==
- Kō Nishimura as Yasuzō Kariba
- Nobuko Otowa as Ryōko Kariba
- Tsutomu Kariba as Tsutomu Kariba
- Aida Hatsuko as Hatsuko Morikawa
- Eiji Okada as Yoshio Morikawa

== Release ==
The Strangling was released in Japan on 2 June 1979. It screened in competition at the 36th Venice International Film Festival, where Nobuko Otowa was awarded as Best Actress, and at the Hong Kong International Film Festival.
