= Nobuko Otowa =

Japanese actress (1924–1994)

- 乙羽 信子
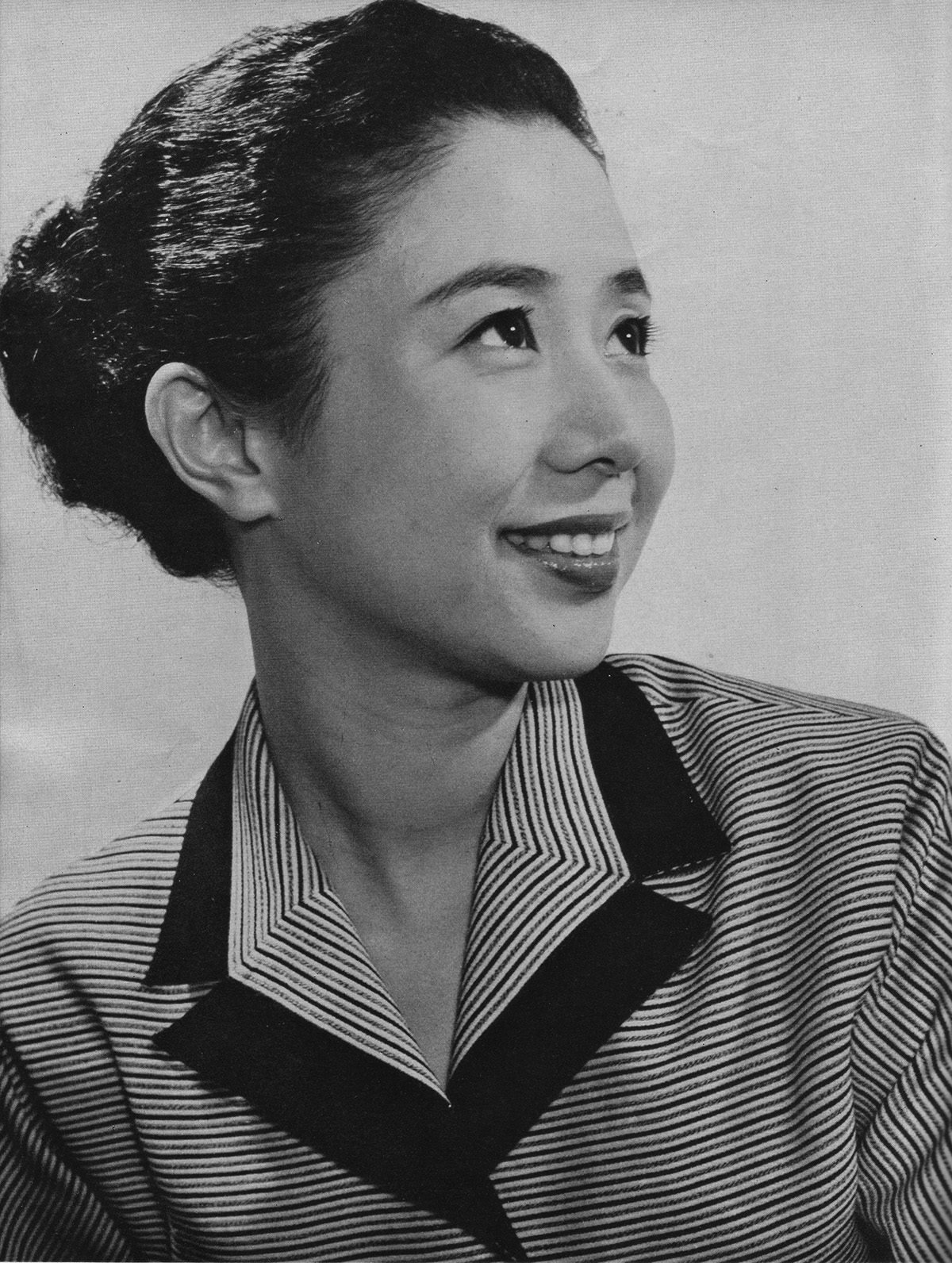
- Nobuko Otowa in 1955
- Born: Nobuko Kaji; 1 October 1924; Yonago, Tottori, Japan
- Died: 22 December 1994 (aged 70)
- Occupation: Actress
- Years active: 1950–1994
- Spouse: Kaneto Shindo (1977–1994, her death)

Nobuko Otowa (乙羽 信子, Otowa Nobuko; 1 October 1924 – 22 December 1994) was a Japanese actress who appeared in more than 100 films between 1950 and 1994.

== Life and career ==
A graduate of Takarazuka Girl's Opera School, Otowa was first signed to Daiei studios, before becoming a freelance actress by the early 1950s. After starring in Kaneto Shindo's Story of a Beloved Wife, she became the director's mistress and appeared in nearly all of his following films. She finally married him in 1977, after his previous wife divorced him. Although closely associated with Shindo's films, with Children of Hiroshima, The Naked Island and Onibaba being among the most well-known, Otowa also worked for noted directors such as Kenji Mizoguchi, Mikio Naruse, Heinosuke Gosho, Keisuke Kinoshita and Nagisa Ōshima. Devoted to her profession, she frequently wrote and lectured on the art of film acting.

In 1995, she was posthumously awarded as best actress in a supporting role at the 19th Japan Academy Prize for A Last Note, having been diagnosed with terminal liver cancer during its production. Half of her ashes are scattered on the island of Sukune in Mihara, Hiroshima, where The Naked Island was filmed.

== Filmography ==
=== Film ===
- Shojoho (1950)
- Miyagi Hiroba (1951)
- Arabiya monogatari (1951)
- Tsuki no wataridori (1951) – Oichi
- Dare ga watashi o sabaku no ka (1951)
- Miss Oyu (1951) – Shizu
- Meigetsu somato (1951)
- Story of a Beloved Wife (1951) – Takako Ishikawa
- The Tale of Genji (1951) – Murasaki no ue
- Izayoi kaido (1951)
- Asakusa kurenaidan (1952) – Maki Ayukawa
- Avalanche (1952) – Atsuko Fujikawa
- Atakake no hitobito (1952)
- Children of Hiroshima (1952) – Takako Ishikawa
- Kantarou tsukiyo-uta (1952) – Okyo
- Senba zuru (1953) – Ayako Ohta
- Onna to iu shiro – Mari no maki (1953)
- Onna to iu shiro – Yuko no maki (1953)
- Hatamoto Taikutsu Otoko 808 Chome (1953)
- Mura hatibu (1953)
- Epitome (1953) – Ginko
- Yokubo (1953) – Shizue Kitami
- Yoake mae (1953) – Hanzo's Daughter
- Life of a Woman (1953) – Fujiko Shirakawa
- Koina no Ginpei (1954) – Oichi
- Utsukushī hito (1954)
- An Inn at Osaka (1954) – Uwabami
- Dobu (1954) – Tsuru
- Dorodarake no seishun (1954) – Nanako
- Ai to shi no tanima (1954)
- Wakai hitotachi (1954)
- Aisureba koso (1955) – Michie (segment 1)
- Ginza no onna (1955)
- Wolf (1955) – Akiko Yano
- Kabuki juhachiban: Narukami – Bijo to kairyu (1955)
- Shirogane Shinjū (1956) – Sakie / Umeko
- Ryūri no Kishi (1956) – Hagiyo, Chiho's mother
- Shin ono ga tsumi (1956)
- Yoake Asaake (1956)
- An Actress (1956) – Kakuko Mori
- Aru yo futatabi (1956)
- Kottaisan yori: Nyotai wa kanashiku (1957) – Tamasode
- Hadairo no tsuki (1957) – Kumiko Uno
- Ukifune (1957) – Naka-no-kimi
- Yagyū bugeichō: Sōryū hiken (1958) – the Princess
- Makeraremasen katsumadewa (1958) – Odama
- Kanashimi wa onna dakeni (1958) – Taka
- A Holiday in Tokyo (1958) – Nobuko
- Yajikita Dochuuki (1958)
- Noren (1958)
- Tsuzurikata kyodai (1958) – Aunt
- Mimizuku (1958)
- Nora neko (1958)
- Yajikita dōchū sugoroku (1958) – Ofutsu / maid
- Hana noren (1959)
- Lucky Dragon No. 5 (1959) – Shizu Kuboyama
- Aisaiki (1959)
- Okaasan no yume (僕らの母さん) (1959)
- Kashima ari (1959)
- Ai no kane (1959)
- The Three Treasures (1959) – Goddess of Anenouzume
- Hanayome-san wa sekai-ichi (1959)
- Waga ai (1960) – Hideya
- Tenka no Odorobo Shiranami Gonin Man (1960)
- Chinpindō shujin (1960)
- Onna no saka (1960)
- Shin jōdaigaku (1960)
- The Twilight Story (1960) – Kyōko Yamai
- The Approach of Autumn (1960) – Shigeko Fukatani – Hideo's Mother
- The Naked Island (1960) – Toyo, the mother
- Hunting Rifle (1961) – Choko's mother
- Mozu (1961)
- Tōkyō yawa (1961) – Yukari
- Kojin koujitsu (1961)
- Netsuai sha (1961) – Tamiko
- Immortal Love (1961) – Tomoko, Takashi's wife
- Gen to fudō myō-ō (1961)
- The Last War (1961) – Oyoshi Tamura
- Awamori-kun Kanpai (1961)
- Aijo no keifu (1961)
- Neko to katsuobushi (1961)
- Ashita aru kagiri (1962)
- Nagashi hina (1962)
- Long Way to Okinawa (1962)
- Ika naru hoshi no moto ni (1962) – Mitoji
- Sei Kurabe (1962)
- Aobeka monogatari (1962) – Kimino
- Ningen (1962) – Gorosuke
- Kawa no hotori de (1962) – Tamako Sekiguchi
- Kigeki ekimae hanten (1962)
- Yushu Heiya (1963)
- Kanojo ni mukatte tosshinsayo (1963)
- Uso (1963) – (segment "San jyotai")
- Shiro to kuro (1963) – Ochiai's Wife
- Daidokoro taiheiki (1963)
- Wanpaku tenshi (1963)
- Hyakumannin no musumetachi (1963)
- Miren (1963) – Hatsu Kakinuma
- Mother (1963) – Tamiko
- Wakai nakamatachi: uchira Gion no maikohan (1963)
- Kigeki ekimae okami (1964) – Kyōko Yamamoto
- Kigeki yōki-na mibōjin (1964) – Kume Tanabe
- The Scent of Incense (Kōge – Nibu: Mitsumata no shō/Ichibu: Waremokō no shō) (1964) – Ikuyo
- Okaasan no baka (1964)
- Kigeki ekimae kaidan (1964)
- Onibaba (1964) – Kichi's Mother
- Daikon to ninjin (1965) – Nobuyo Yamaki
- Nami kage (1965) – Masa, Kichitaro's wife
- Kigeki ekimae kin'yū (1965)
- Daiku taiheki (1965)
- Akuto (1965) – Jiju
- Abare Gōemon (1966) – Osasa
- Kigeki ekimae benten (1966)
- Lost Sex (1966) – The Housemaid
- Akogare (1966)
- Kigeki ekimae keiba (1966)
- Danshun (1966)
- Kigeki ekimae mangan (1967)
- Izu no odoriko (1967)
- Kigeki ekimae gakuen (1967)
- Zoku Na mo naku mazushiku utsukushiku: Chichi to ko (1967) – Taeko Sakai
- Sei no kigen (1967) – Wife
- Kigeki ekimae hyakku-nen (1967)
- Kuroneko (1968) – Yone (Mother)
- Tsuyomushi onna to yowamushi otoko (1968) – Fumiko
- Āh himeyuri no tō (1968) – Hatsu Yonamine
- Machi ni izumi ga atta (1968) – Toki Yano
- Red Lion (1969) – Oharu
- Heat Wave Island (1969) – Otoyo
- Shokkaku (1970) – Tamiko / Prostitute Yuki
- Live Today, Die Tomorrow! (1970) – Take Yamada
- The Ceremony (1971) – Sakurada Shizu
- Kanawa (1972) – Middle aged woman
- Sanka (1972) – Teru Kamozawa
- The Heart (1973) – Mrs. M
- Kōkotsu no hito (1973) – Kyōko
- Shiawase (1974)
- Waga michi (1974) – Mino Kawamura
- Kenji Mizoguchi: The Life of a Film Director (documentary) (1975) – Herself
- Kyukei no Koya (1975)
- The Life of Chikuzan (1977)
- The Incident (1978)
- The Strangling (1979) – Ryoko, Mother
- Haitatsu sarenai santsu no tegami (1979) – Sumie, Mitsumasa's wife
- Kangofu no oyaji ganbaru (1980)
- Omoeba tōkue kitamonda (1980)
- Asshii-tachi no machi (1981) – Haru Hayasaka
- Ore to aitsu no monogatari (1981)
- Edo Porn (1981) – Omomo, Sashichi's Wife
- Ekisutora (1982) – Kinuyo Adachi
- Mikan no taikyoku (1982)
- The Go Masters (1983)
- The Horizon (1984) – Hideyo, after age 40
- Location (1984) – Katsue
- Tengoku ni ichiban chikai shima (1984) – Tei Ishikawa
- Shiroi machi hiroshima (1985)
- Yasha (1985) – Ume
- Lost in the Wilderness (1986) – Yasuko Muto
- Burakkubōdo (1986) – Namie Yasui
- Tree Without Leaves (1986) – Mother
- Nijushi no hitomi (1987) – Okami
- Sakura-tai Chiru (1988) – Narration
- Yumemi-dōri no hitobito (1989)
- Donmai (1990) – Toyo Murakami
- Pachinko monogatari (1990)
- Bokuto kidan (1992) – Masa
- Tsuribaka nisshi 5 (1992) – Densuke's mother
- A Last Note (1995) – Toyoko Yanagawa
- By Player (2000) – herself

=== Television (selection) ===
- Tadaima (1964–1967)
- Taikōki (1965) – Oetsu
- Saigo no jigazō (1977)
- Yokomizo Seishi Shirīzu (1977–1978)
- Nagisa no onna (1980)
- Kazunomiya sama otome (1981)
- Oshin (1983–1984) – Oshin
- Shinju yoi goshin (1984)
- The Asami Mitsuhiko Mystery (1987–1990)
- Ōinaru gen'ei (1989)
- Haha: Inochi yomigaeru hi (1992)
- Asahina Shūhei misuterī 3: Tangoji satsujin jiken (1992)
- Ude ni oboe ari (1992–1993)

== Awards and honors ==
Japan Academy Prize

- 1996: Best Supporting Actress, A Last Note

Blue Ribbon Awards

- 1966: Best Supporting Actress, Lost Sex
- 1953: Best Actress, Epitome, Life of a Woman and Yokubo

Kinema Junpo Awards

- 1996: Best Supporting Actress, A Last Note

Mainichi Film Awards

- 1996: Lifetime Achievement Award
- 1993: Best Supporting Actress, The Strange Story of Oyuki
- 1968: Best Actress, Operation Negligee and Kuroneko

36th Venice International Film Festival

- 1979: Pasinetti Award (Best Actress), The Strangling
