= Hanayome-san wa sekai-ichi =

1959 Japanese film

- Directed by: Kaneto Shindō
- Written by: Kaneto Shindō
- Produced by: Yoshiki Yamazaki
- Starring: Frankie Sakai; Izumi Yukimura; Nobuko Otowa; Kumi Mizuno
- Cinematography: Seiichi Endo
- Music by: Kenjirō Hirose
- Production company: Tokyo Eiga
- Distributed by: Toho
- Release date: 22 November 1959 (Japan)
- Running time: 95 minutes
- Country: Japan
- Language: Japanese

Hanayome-san wa sekai-ichi (花嫁さんは世界一; lit. "The best bride in the world") is a 1959 Japanese comedy film written and directed by Kaneto Shindō and starring Frankie Sakai.

== Cast ==
- Frankie Sakai
- Izumi Yukimura
- Nobuko Otowa
- Kumi Mizuno
