= Postcard (2010 film) =

2010 film

- Film poster
- Directed by: Kaneto Shindō
- Written by: Kaneto Shindō
- Produced by: Jirō Shindō
- Starring: Etsushi Toyokawa
- Cinematography: Masahiko Hayashi
- Edited by: Yukio Watanabe
- Music by: Hikaru Hayashi
- Production company: Kindai Eiga Kyokai
- Release dates: October 2010 (Tokyo IFF); August 13, 2011 (Japan)
- Running time: 114 minutes
- Country: Japan
- Language: Japanese

Postcard (Japanese: 一枚のハガキ, Hepburn: Ichimai no hagaki) is a 2010 Japanese drama film written and directed by Kaneto Shindō. It was Shindō's last film before his death in 2012 at age 100. The film is set during and after the Pacific War and deals with the effect of the death of soldiers on their families. It is loosely based on Shindō's wartime experiences. It was selected as the Japanese entry for the Best Foreign Language Film at the 84th Academy Awards, but it was not nominated.

== Plot ==
Near the end of the Pacific War, Sadazo Morikawa is one of a group of 100 overaged conscripts for the Japanese navy assigned to cleaning duty. Once the cleaning duty has finished, the members are chosen by lottery for various duties. Sadazo is assigned to serve in the Philippines. He thinks he will not survive, and asks a comrade, Matsuyama, to return a postcard to his wife, Tomoko, and tell her that he received it before he died.

Earlier, Sadazo is conscripted, and he says goodbye to his parents Yukichi and Chiyo and wife Tomoko. Later, a military official reports Sadazo's death. Sadazo's parents plead with Tomoko not to leave, and to marry their younger son Sanpei. Tomoko agrees to marry Sanpei. Sanpei is conscripted. He considers running away but his parents tell him it is useless. Sanpei dies in the war. Later, during farm work, Yukichi dies from a heart condition. Chiyo gives Tomoko some money and then hangs herself.

The war ends and Matsuyama returns to Japan. His wife has run away after an affair with his father, and is now working as a bar hostess in Osaka. They meet and argue, and she tells him she wishes he had died in the war. Matsuyama makes his way to Tomoko's house to deliver the postcard. He talks about Sadazo and tells her he plans to go to Brazil. He has 200,000 yen from the sale of his fishing boat, and he tries to give her half. She refuses. He has a fight with Kichigoro, another suitor of Tomoko. After Tomoko and Matsuyama quarrel, they agree to go to Brazil together. They burn Sadazo and Sanpei's ashes. Tomoko gets drunk and sets fire to the house. Matsuyama pulls her out of the burning house. They decide to stay in Japan and grow barley on the site of the old house. The film ends with them in the field of barley.

== Cast ==
- Etsushi Toyokawa as Keita Matsuyama
- Shinobu Otake as Tomoko Morikawa
- Naomasa Musaka as Morikawa
- Akira Emoto as Yukichi Morikawa
- Ren Ohsugi as Kichigoro

== Production ==
The film is loosely based on Shindō's experiences during the Pacific War, when, despite being considered poorly fit for military service, he was one of a unit of 100 men conscripted into the Japanese navy, of whom only six survived, solely because of a lottery. Shindō was 98 years old at the time of filming.

The musical score is by Shindō's long term collaborator Hikaru Hayashi.

== Reception ==
Postcard premiered at the 23rd Tokyo International Film Festival in October 2010, where Shindō announced that this would be his last film. The film was selected as the Japanese entry for the Best Foreign Language Film at the 84th Academy Awards, but it did not make the final shortlist.

== See also ==
- Cinema of Japan
- List of submissions to the 84th Academy Awards for Best Foreign Language Film
- List of Japanese submissions for the Academy Award for Best Foreign Language Film
