= The Ball at the Anjo House =

1947 Japanese film

- Theatrical release poster
- Directed by: Kōzaburō Yoshimura
- Written by: Kaneto Shindō; Kōzaburō Yoshimura (story)
- Produced by: Takeshi Ogura
- Starring: Setsuko Hara; Osamu Takizawa; Masayuki Mori
- Cinematography: Toshio Ubukata
- Edited by: Yoshi Sugihara
- Music by: Chuji Kinoshita
- Production company: Shochiku
- Distributed by: Shochiku
- Release date: 27 September 1947 (Japan)
- Running time: 89 minutes
- Country: Japan
- Language: Japanese

The Ball at the Anjo House (Japanese: 安城家の舞踏会, Hepburn: Anjō-ke no Butōkai) is a 1947 Japanese drama film directed by Kōzaburō Yoshimura. The film won the 1947 Kinema Junpo Award for Best Film.

== Plot ==
After Japan's defeat in the Pacific War, the wealthy Anjō family have to give up their mansion and their way of life in the wake of the post-war agrarian reform. While the widowed father Tadahiko grieves for the lost social status, and both the cynical son Masahiko and the older sister show only contempt for their lower-class ex-lovers who they dropped, the younger daughter Atsuko accepts the new circumstances and tries to find her own place in the new Japan. Tadahiko decides to hold one last ball at the house before leaving, which results in numerous confrontations, including Tadahiko and ruthless businessman Shinkawa, to whom he is indebted, and Masahiko and his fiancée Yōko, Shinkawa's daughter. Towards the end of the festivity, Tadahiko officially presents his geisha mistress as his life partner to the noble guests. After the ball has ended, he tries to commit suicide, but is held back by Atsuko.

== Cast ==
- Setsuko Hara as Atsuko Anjō
- Osamu Takizawa as Tadahiko Anjō
- Masayuki Mori as Masahiko Anjō
- Yumeko Aizome as Akiko Anjō
- Masao Shimizu as Ryūzaburō Shinkawa
- Keiko Tsushima as Yōko Shinkawa
- Chieko Murata as Chiyo

== Legacy ==
The British Film Institute included The Ball at the Anjo House in its "Best Japanese film of every year" list, pointing out the film's "inventive camerawork" and "superb performances", in particular those by Setsuko Hara and Masayuki Mori, and calling it "stylish", "moving" and "intelligent". Film historian Donald Richie drew parallels between Kaneto Shindō's script and Anton Chekhov's The Cherry Orchard in his book A Hundred Years of Japanese Film.

The Ball at the Anjo House was screened at a 2012 retrospective on Kaneto Shindō and Kōzaburō Yoshimura in London, organised by the British Film Institute and the Japan Foundation.

== Awards ==
- 1948: Kinema Junpo Award for Best Film of the Year
- 1948: Mainichi Film Award for Best Actor Masayuki Mori
