= Hikaru Hayashi =

Japanese composer, pianist and conductor

- Hayashi in 1955
- Born: October 22, 1931; Tokyo, Japan
- Died: January 5, 2012 (aged 80); Tokyo, Japan
- Other name: 林 光
- Occupations: Composer, pianist, conductor

Hikaru Hayashi (林 光, Hayashi Hikaru; October 22, 1931 – January 5, 2012) was a Japanese composer, pianist and conductor. Hayashi is considered to be one of the most renowned and accomplished Japanese composers of the postwar period. In particular, Hayashi was noted for his choral suite Scenes from Hiroshima (1958–2001).

In exploring the possibilities of Japanese language opera, Hayashi composed more than 30 operas. He was artistic director and resident composer of the Opera Theatre Konnyakuza. His oeuvre also includes symphonic works, works for band, chamber music, choral works, songs and more than 100 film scores. Hayashi was also the author of more than 20 books including Nihon opera no yume (日本オペラの夢 The Dream of Japanese Opera).

In 1998 Hayashi won the 30th Suntory Music Award.

== Early life ==
Hikaru Hayashi was born in Tokyo on October 22, 1931. He was the cousin of renowned flautist Ririko Hayashi. Hayashi's father was a physician who had graduated from Keiō University Medical School, and had studied in Berlin before returning to Japan to take up a position as a professor at Nihon University. A musical prodigy, Hayashi began studying music under his father's friend, the famed composer Hisatada Otaka, at the age of 10, composing numerous full-length chamber music and orchestral works while still a child. Hayashi later entered Tokyo University of the Arts as a composition student but did not complete his studies.

== Career ==
In 1953, Hayashi co-founded the "Goat Society" (山羊の会, Yagi no Kai) with other young composers such as Michio Mamiya and Yuzō Toyama. The aim of the society was to develop a new form of Japanese classical music different from wartime ultranationalist music. Over the course of the 1950s, the group increasingly became involved in left-wing politics. For example in 1958, when conservative prime minister Nobusuke Kishi attempted to pass a draconian Police Duties Bill to crack down on left-wing protesters, the Goat Society inserted a statement opposing the bill into the program of their fifth anniversary concert.

From 1959 to 1960, Hayashi participated in the Anpo protests against revision of the U.S.-Japan Security Treaty alongside other young composers, artists, and writers as part of the "Young Japan Society" (若い日本の会, Wakai Nihon no Kai). Hayashi was deeply affected by the failure of the protests to stop the treaty, and penned several ballads about the movement, including "6/15," a song in honor of the memory of Tokyo University student Michiko Kanba, who had been killed during the protests.

Immediately following the protests, Hayashi helped co-found the Seinen Geijutsu Gekijō ("Youth Art Theater"), which was one of the earliest theatre troupes in the Angura movement of radical, "underground" avant-garde theatre.

Beginning in the late 1950s, Hayashi became increasingly known for his innovative film scores, especially as part of his long-running collaboration with Japanese filmmaker Kaneto Shindo, beginning with his scoring of Shindo's film Daigo Fukuryū Maru, ("Lucky Dragon No. 5," 1959), which was based on the Lucky Dragon No. 5 nuclear fallout incident of 1954. For example, Hayashi created "harrowing" scores for the Shindo-directed horror films Onibaba ("Demon Hag," 1964) and Kuroneko ("The Black Cat," 1968) by combining taiko drums with the sound of human screams. Hayashi also collaborated with filmmaker Nagisa Ōshima, scoring Ōshima films such as Violence at Noon (1966), Band of Ninja (1967), and Death by Hanging (1968). Ultimately, Hayashi would go on to craft scores for more than 100 films.

In 1975, Hayashi was appointed artistic director and resident composer of the Opera Theatre Konnyakuza in Tokyo, a post he held until his death in 2012.

== Later life and death ==
In September 2011, Hayashi collapsed in front of his home, hitting his head. He was rushed to the hospital in an unresponsive state, where he received treatment for several months. He died on January 5, 2012, at the age of 80.

== Selected works ==
Opera

- Gauche the Cellist (セロ弾きのゴーシュ) (1986); based on the novel by Kenji Miyazawa
- The Forest Is Alive (Mori wa ikite iru; 森は生きている) (1991), after the novel by Samuil Marshak — this opera has been unusually successful, with two complete recordings and regular revivals
- Metamorphosis (変身 セールスマンKの憂鬱) (1996); based on the short story by Franz Kafka
- I Am a Cat (吾輩は猫である) (1998); based on the novel by Natsume Sōseki
- Three Sisters (三人姉妹) (2001); based on the play by Anton Chekhov
- Revenge of the Dog (イヌの仇討ち あるいは吉良の決断) (2002); based on the novel by Hisashi Inoue
- Last Adventure of Don Quixote (花のラ・マンチャ騎士道 あるいはドン・キホーテ最後の冒険) (2004); based on the novel by Miguel de Cervantes
- Romeo and Juliet (瓦礫のなかのロミオ&ジュリエット) (2006); based on the play by William Shakespeare

Orchestral

- Symphony in G (1953)
- Variations for Orchestra (1955)
- Festive Overture (祝典序曲) (1976)
- Symphony No. 2 "Canciones" (1983)
- Fukinukeru Natsukaze no Matsuri (吹き抜ける夏風の祭) (1985); recorded 1988 DENON, The Contemporary Music of Japan, COCO-70960, Kyoto Symphony Orchestra, Koizumi, Kazuhiro conductor.
- Symphonic Sketch (シンフォニック・スケッチ) (1988–1992)
- Symphony No. 3 "At Noon, the August Sun..." (1990)

Concertante

- Guitar Concerto (ギター協奏曲＜北の帆船＞)
- Viola Concerto "Elegia" (悲歌) for viola and string orchestra (1995)
- Xylophone Concerto (木琴協奏曲＜夏の雲はしる＞) (2007)

Chamber music

- Rhapsody for violin and piano (1965)
- Sonata for flute and piano (1967)
- Winter on 72nd St. (72丁目の冬) for violin and piano (1968)
- String Quartet "Legende" (レゲンデ) (1989)
- Vines (蔓枝) for viola solo (1999)
- Viola Sonata "Process" (プロセス) for viola and piano (2002)

Piano

- Theme and Variations (主題と変奏) (1946)
- Rondo in G major (ロンド ト長調) (1950)
- Dance Suite (舞踏組曲) for 2 pianos (1954)
- Sonata [No. 1] (1965)
- Sonatina (1966)
- The Diary of Dr. Pamir (パミール博士の日記) for piano 4-hands (1977)
- Bevat: Tuk-kui-gwa (徳利小) (1979)
- Blanqui (ブランキ) for piano 4-hands (1979)
- The Zoo (動物園) (1979)
- Attā-wanku-wantū (あったーわんくわとぅー) (1980)
- Garasa (がらさ) (1980)
- Modottekita hizuke (もどってきた日付) (1980)
- Sangitsu (さんぎつ) (1980)
- Sonata No. 2 "About Trees" (「木々について) (1981)
- Tei-chi dei-chi denden (てぃーちでぃーる・じんじん Tīchi dīru jinjin) (1981)
- Mimichiri bōji (耳打り坊主) (1982)
- Warszawianka Variations (ワルシャヴィアンカ変奏曲) (1982)
- 48 Songs for Piano (ピアノのための48のうた) (1983)
- Harlequin (アルレッキーノ) for 2 pianos (1984)
- Shima-kodomo-uta II (Nursery Songs from Southern Islands II; 島こども歌2) (1984)
- Tori-tachi no hachigatsu (鳥たちの八月) for 2 pianos 8-hands (1984)
- Chameleon (カメレオン) for piano 4-hands (1986)
- Tale (ものがたり) (1986)
- Jikoku wo nozoku Arurekkīno (地獄を覗くアルレッキーノ) for 2 pianos (1987)
- Sonata No. 3 "New Angel" (「新しい天使」) (1987)
- Postlude (POSTLUDE/静岡東高校校歌によるパラフレーズ), Paraphrase on the Shizuoka East High School Hymn (1992)
- Sōkō no mori (Forest of Drafts; 前奏曲「草稿の森」) (1993)
- 四都 for 2 pianos (2000)
- Khanbaliq (カムバリク) for 2 pianos (2004)
- Dance Suite for 2 pianos (2004)
- 3 Intermezzos (三つの間奏曲) (2006)..

Film scores

- Voice Without a Shadow (影なき声) (1958)
- Ballad of the Cart (荷車の歌) (1959)
- Lucky Dragon No. 5 (第五福竜丸) (1959)
- Blood Is Dry (血は渇いてる) (1960)
- The Naked Island (裸の島) (1960)
- Girls of the Night (女ばかりの夜) (1961)
- Bitter End of a Sweet Night (甘い夜の果て) (1961)
- Akitsu Springs (秋津温泉) (1962)
- Burari Bura-bura Monogatari (ぶらりぶらぶら物語) (1962)
- Love Under the Crucifix (お吟さま) (1962)
- Ningen (人間) (1962)
- Mother (母) (1963)
- Brave Records of the Sanada Clan (真田風雲録) (1963)
- Onibaba (鬼婆) (1964)
- Akuto (悪党) (1965)
- Lost Sex (本能) (1966)
- The Stranger Within a Woman (女の中にいる他人) (1966)
- Double Suicide: Japanese Summer (無理心中日本の夏) (1967)
- Tales of the Ninja (忍者武芸帳) (1967)
- Sing a Song of Sex (日本春歌考) (1967)
- Three Resurrected Drunkards (帰って来たヨッパライ) (1968)
- Kuroneko (藪の中の黒猫) (1968)
- Death by Hanging (絞死刑) (1968)
- Boy (少年) (1969)
- Heat Wave Island (かげろう) (1969)
- Live Today, Die Tomorrow! (裸の十九才) (1970)
- Yakuza Zessyō (やくざ絶唱) (1970)
- Under the Flag of the Rising Sun (軍旗はためく下に) (1972)
- The Heart (心) (1973)
- The Life of Chikuzan (竹山ひとり旅) (1977)
- The Strangling (絞殺) (1979)
- Edo Porn (北斎漫画) (1981)
- The Go Masters (未完の対局) (1982)
- Black Board (ブラックボード) (1986)
- Tree Without Leaves (落葉樹) (1986)
- Sakura-tai Chiru (さくら隊散る) (1988)
- A Last Note (午後の遺言状) (1995)
- Will to Live (生きたい) (1999)
- By Player (三文役者) (2000)
- Owl (ふくろう) (2003)
- Postcard (一枚のハガキ) (2010)
