= Kindai Eiga Kyōkai =

Japanese film studio

Kindai Eiga Kyōkai (近代映画協会; "Modern Film Association") is a Japanese independent film studio. It was formed in 1950 by directors Kōzaburō Yoshimura and Kaneto Shindo and actor Taiji Tonoyama, and went on to produce most of Shindo's films, such as The Naked Island and Onibaba.

== History ==
Kindai Eiga Kyōkai was formed in 1950 when Kōzaburō Yoshimura and Kaneto Shindo decided to leave the Shochiku production company. It was formed together with actor Taiji Tonoyama.

By 1960, the company was almost bankrupt. With little money left, Shindo decided to make one last film, The Naked Island. This was a hit abroad, winning a prize at the Moscow Film Festival, and the money earned by signing foreign distribution rights was enough to keep the company afloat.

Throughout its history, the company was never highly profitable, with profits being reinvested into making more films.

== Productions ==
Date	Title
1949	Kitsune no homerun-ō
1952	Children of Hiroshima
1953	Life of a Woman
1953	Epitome
1953	Before Dawn
1953	Yokubo
1953	Murahachibu
1954	Dobu
1954	Cape Ashizuri
1955	The Wolves
1956	Wedding Day
1956	An Actress
1959	Lucky Dragon No. 5
1960	The Naked Island
1962	Ningen
1963	Mother
1964	Onibaba
1965	Akuto
1966	Lost Sex
1966	Kokoro no sanmyaku
1967	A Fallen Woman
1967	Libido
1968	Kuroneko
1968	Strong Women, Weak Men
1968	The House of the Sleeping Virgins
1969	Heat Wave Island
1970	Live Today, Die Tomorrow!
1970	Strange Affinity
1971	Sweet Secret
1972	Hymn
1972	Kanawa
1972	A Chorus of One Million People
1972	Rika: The Mixed-Blood Girl
1973	Rika 2: Lonely Wanderer
1973	Rika 3: Juvenile’s Lullaby
1974	My Way
1975	Kenji Mizoguchi: The Life of a Film Director
1976	Two Harmonicas
1977	The Life of Chikuzan
1977	Tomorrow Evening
1978	Horror of the Giant Vortex
1979	The Strangling
1979	Mother Teresa and Her World
1980	Nurse’s Husband
1986	Black Board
1988	Sakura-tai Chiru
1992	The Strange Tale of Oyuki
1993	Dying at a Hospital
1995	A Last Note
1996	Cab
1997	Tokyo Lullaby
1998	Looking For
1999	Will to Live
1999	Osaka Story
1999	Adrenaline Drive
2000	By Player
2002	Oriume
2003	Owl
2004	River of First Love
2004	Zero
2005	Sayonara Color
2007	Midnight March
2008	Teacher and Three Children
2010	Postcard

== Bibliography ==
- Michiyoshi Takashima, ed. (1980). Kindai Eiga Kyōkai no 30-nen, 1950-1980 (in Japanese). Tokyo: Kindai Eiga Kyōkai. OCLC 46902212.
