= Taiji Tonoyama =

Japanese actor (1915–1989)

- 殿山 泰司
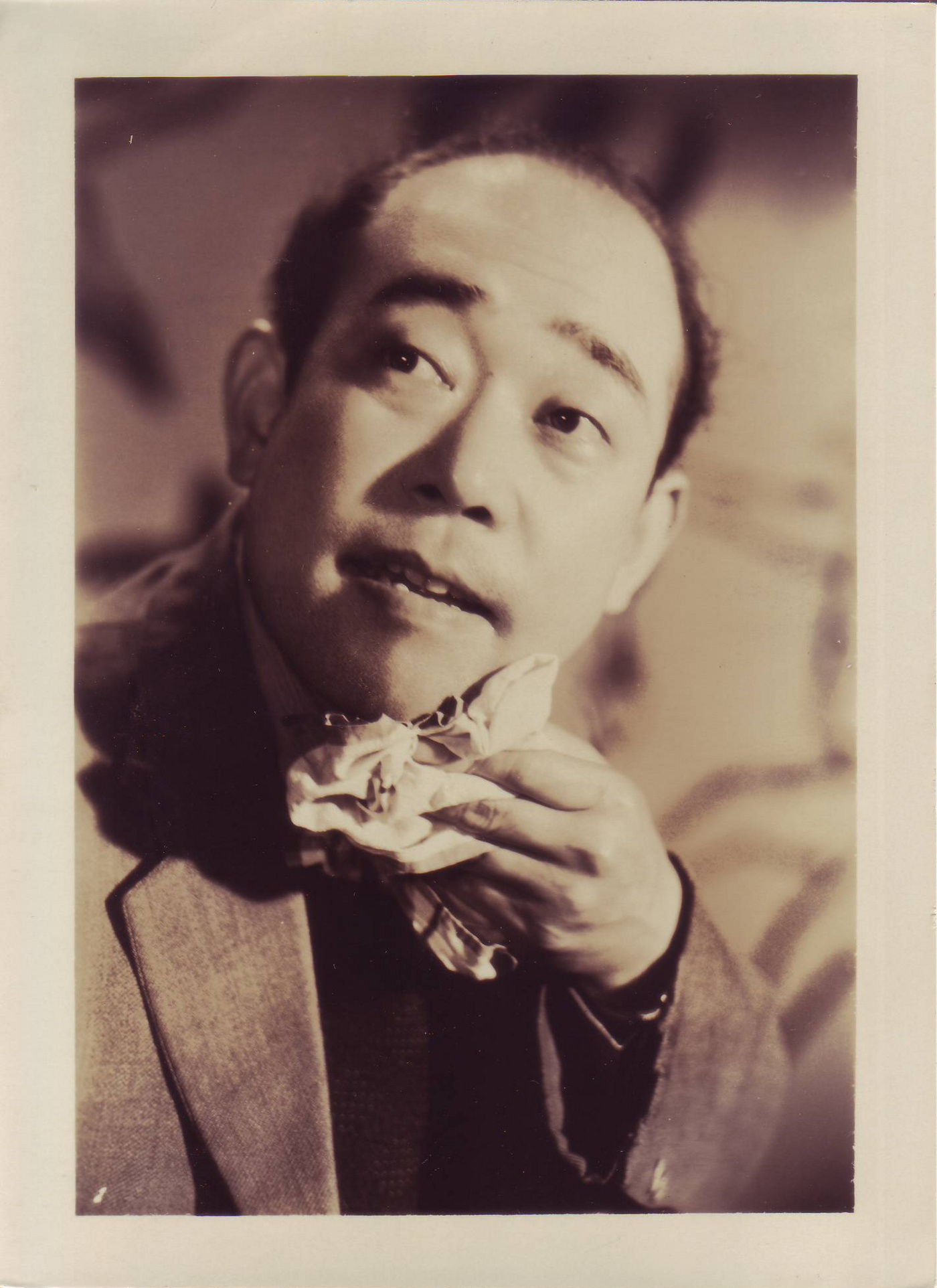
- Born: October 17, 1915; Kobe, Hyogo, Japan
- Died: April 30, 1989 (aged 73)
- Occupation: Actor
- Years active: 1939–1989

Taiji Tonoyama (殿山 泰司, Tonoyama Taiji; October 17, 1915 – April 30, 1989) was a Japanese character actor who made many appearances in films and on television from 1939 to 1989. He was a close friend of Kaneto Shindo and one of his regular cast members. He was also an essayist. In 1950 he helped form the film company Kindai Eiga Kyokai with Shindo and Kōzaburō Yoshimura.

He served in the Japanese military in China in the Second Sino-Japanese War and considered himself to have narrowly escaped from death. He was married but also had a mistress and maintained relationships with both women until the end of his life. He was a keen reader of detective stories and a fan of jazz music. He wrote a series of semi-autobiographical essays under the title Sanmon Yakusha (三文役者), meaning "third rate actor". Kaneto Shindo wrote a biography of Tonoyama called Sanmon yakusha no shi, (Note: 三文役者の死) meaning "The death of a third-rate actor", which he also filmed as By Player.

== Filmography (selected) ==
Date	Title	Role
1947	Record of a Tenement Gentleman	
1948	President and female clerk	Butler Kurokawa
1951	The Tale of Genji	
1952	Dedication of the Great Buddha	
1952	Avalanche	
1952	Children of Hiroshima	
1953	Epitome	
1953	Life of a Woman	
1953	Jazz musume tanjō	
1955	Wolf	
1956	Shirogane Shinjū	
1956	An Actress	
1956	Fearful Attack of the Flying Saucers	Dr. Otsuki
1957	Sun in the Last Days of the Shogunate	
1958	Night Drum	
1959	My Second Brother	
1959	Good Morning	Door-to-door salesman
1959	Lucky Dragon No. 5	Mayor of Yaizu
1960	The Naked Island	Husband
1962	Foundry Town	
1962	Ningen	Kamegoro
1963	Kanto Wanderer	
1963	The Insect Woman	
1964	Onibaba	Ushi
1965	An Innocent Witch	Yamasan
1965	Akuto	
1965	Kuroneko	Farmer
1965	Profound Desires of the Gods	
1971	A Soul to Devils	
1972	The Rendezvous	
1972	Dear Summer Sister	Takuzo Sakurada
1973	The Heart	
1974	The Homeless	
1976	In the Realm of the Senses	Old beggar
1976	Torakku Yarō: Tenka Gomen	
1977	The Life of Chikuzan	
1977	Ballad of Orin	Charcoal Man
1978	Ogin-sama	Ankokuji Ekei
1978	Empire of Passion	
1979	Vengeance Is Mine	Tanejiro Shibata
1979	Tantei Monogatari (episode 6)	Boss of Kyoei Shoji
1981	Eijanaika	
1981	Edo Porn	Woodcarver
1981	Muddy River	
1983	The Ballad of Narayama	
1985	Seburi monogatari	
1986	Tree Without Leaves	Sakuzo
1986	Comic Magazine	
1987	Zegen	
1989	Black Rain	

== Books ==
Date	Romanized title	Original title	Notes	ISBN
1969	Nihon onna chizu: shizen wa nikutai ni donna eikyo o ataeru ka	日本女地図: 自然は、肉体にどんな影響を与えるのか	A comparison of women's bodies, particularly their vaginas, in different parts of Japan.	ISBN 978-4-04-154201-9
1980	Sanmon yakusha anaki den parts one to three	三文役者あなあきい伝PART1~PART3		ISBN 978-4-480-02937-9
