= Jukichi Uno =

Japanese actor (1914–1988)

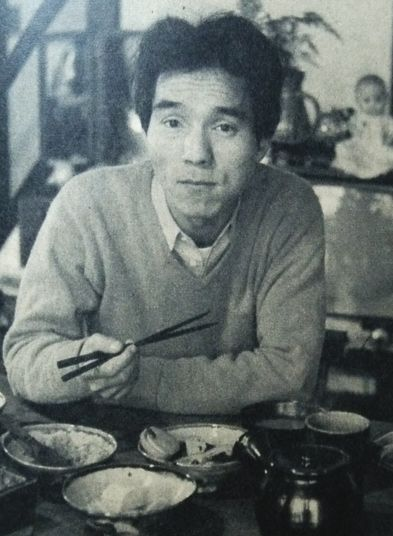
- Uno in 1955
- Born: September 27, 1914; Asuwa-Gun, Fukui Prefecture, Japan
- Died: January 9, 1988 (aged 73)
- Occupation: actor
- Years active: 1932–1988
- Children: Akira Terao

Jūkichi Uno (宇野重吉, Uno Jūkichi) (real name Nobuo Terao (寺尾 信夫); 27 September 1914 – 9 January 1988) was a Japanese actor. In 1950, he formed the Gekidan Mingei (劇団民藝) with Osamu Takizawa and others.

== Personal life ==
He is the father of musician Akira Terao.

== Filmography ==
Date	Title	Role
1948	Apostasy	Ginnosuke Tuchiya
1949	Yotsuya Kaidan (Note: This 2h38 film, in general divided in two parts, and also known as The Yotsuya Ghost Story, was directed by Keisuke Kinoshita.)	Yomoshichi
1950	Wedding Ring	Michio Kuki, the husband
1951	Story of a Beloved Wife	The husband
1952	The Life of Oharu	Yakichi Ogiya
1952	Children of Hiroshima	Kōji
1953	Love Letter	Naoto Yamaji
1953	Epitome	Ginzō
1953	Life of a Woman	Masao, Fujiko's brother
1955	Wolf	
1956	Night School	Ryohei's father
1956	Shirogane Shinjū	Kiichi
1956	An Actress	
1958	Sorrow is Only for Women	Kishimoto
1959	Lucky Dragon No. 5	Manakichi Kuboyama, the radio operator
1962	Akitsu Springs	Kenkichi Matsumiya
1964	Onibaba	The masked samurai
1965	A Chain of Islands	Akiyama
1970	Fuji sanchō	
1974	Izu no Odoriko	Narrator
1976	Tora-san's Sunrise and Sunset	

== Honours ==
- Medal with Purple Ribbon (1981)
