= Kōzaburō Yoshimura =

Japanese film director (1911–2000)

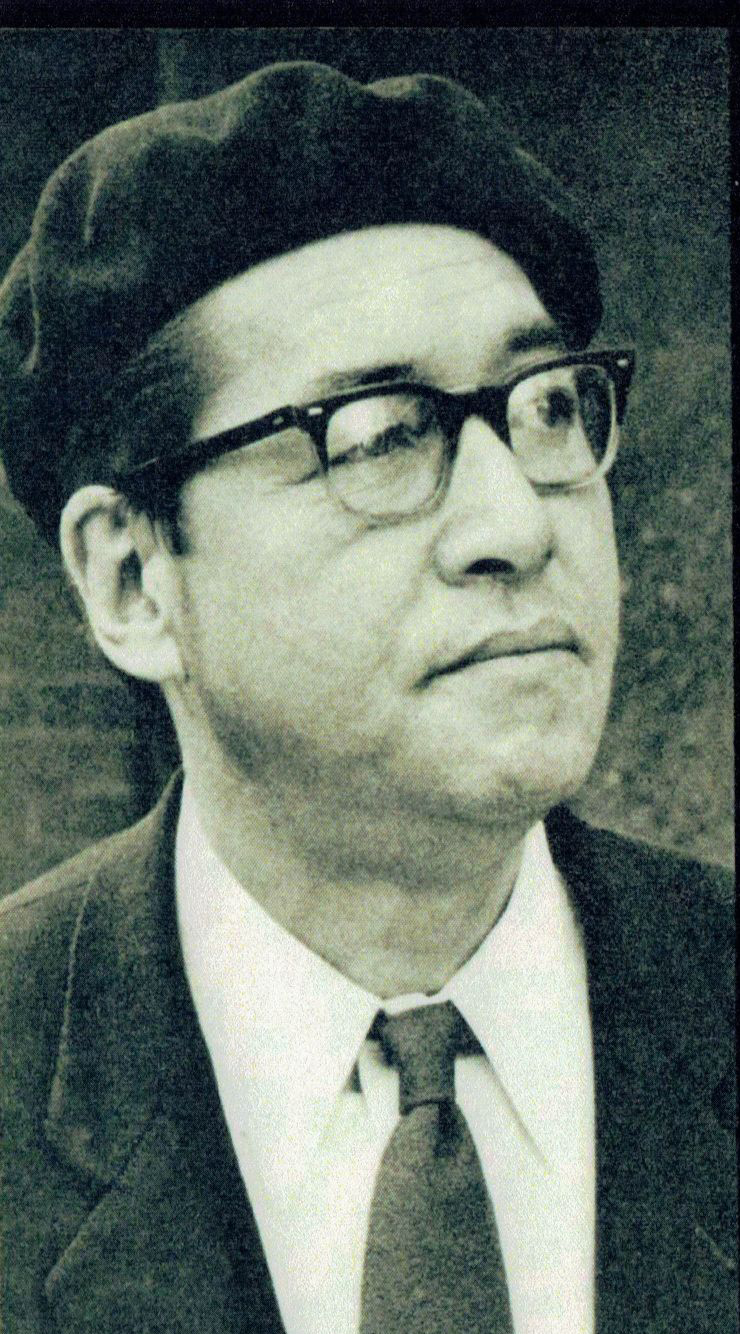
- Yoshimura in 1967
- Born: 9 September 1911; Ōtsu, Shiga, Japan
- Died: 7 November 2000 (aged 89); Yokohama, Kanagawa, Japan
- Other name: Kimisaburo Yoshimura
- Occupation: Film director
- Years active: 1929–1974

Kōzaburō Yoshimura (吉村 公三郎, Yoshimura Kōzaburō; 9 September 1911 – 7 November 2000) was a Japanese film director.

== Biography ==
Born in Shiga Prefecture, he joined the Shōchiku studio in 1929. He debuted as director with a short film in 1934, but, after being denied a promotion by head of the studio Shirō Kido, continued working as an assistant director for filmmakers Yasujirō Ozu and Yasujirō Shimazu on films like Our Neighbor, Miss Yae and What Did the Lady Forget? It was the 1939 film Warm Current that established his status as a director. During the Sino-Japanese War he directed a number of military dramas such as The Story of Tank Commander Nishizumi (1940), for which he toured the actual battlefields in China.

Yoshimura's 1947 The Ball at the Anjo House, starring Setsuko Hara, was named the best picture of the year by film magazine Kinema Junpo and is regarded as one of his major works. The film marked the start of a long relationship with screenwriter and film director Kaneto Shindō. In 1950, the two of them left Shōchiku and started the independent production company Kindai Eiga Kyōkai. For his 1951 Clothes of Deception, produced by Daiei Film, Yoshimura received the Mainichi Film Award for Best Director. Since the mid-1950s, Yoshimura's films were produced mostly by Daiei.

Donald Richie and Joseph L. Anderson pointed out the lack of a cohesive visual style in Yoshimura's films, arguing that due to the wide range of material which Yoshimura chose, his style had to adapt to each individual film. According to Richie and Anderson, the one distinguishable cinematic element of his later films was Yoshimura's quick editing. The director's "most typical films" (Alexander Jacoby) were contemporary dramas focusing on sympathetically drawn female characters, which earned him the comparison with Kenji Mizoguchi.

Notable examples of Yoshimura's later work include Night River (1956), An Osaka Story (1957, a project he had taken over from Mizoguchi), Night Butterflies (1957) and Bamboo Doll of Echizen (1963). He is credited with furthering the careers of actresses such as Fujiko Yamamoto, Ayako Wakao and his regular collaborator Machiko Kyō, from whom he elicited outstanding performances. In 1976, he received a Medal of Honor (Purple Ribbon) for artistic accomplishments.

== Selected filmography ==
=== Director ===
- Warm Current (暖流, Danryū) (1939)
- The Story of Tank Commander Nishizumi (1940)
- The Spy Isn't Dead Yet (1942)
- The Ball at the Anjo House (1947)
- Temptation (1948)
- Clothes of Deception (偽れる盛装, Itsuwareru seiso) (1951)
- The Tale of Genji (1951)
- Thousand Cranes (1953)
- Before Dawn (1953)
- Yokubo (1953)
- Cape Ashizuri (1954)
- Ginza no onna (1955)
- Night River (1956)
- Wedding Day (1956)
- An Osaka Story (1957)
- Night Butterflies (1957)
- A Woman's Uphill Slope (女の坂, Onna no saka) (1960)
- A Woman's Testament (1960, episode "The Woman Who Forgot to Love")
- Bamboo Doll of Echizen (1963)
- Kokoro no sanmyaku (1966)
- A Fallen Woman (1967)
- The House of the Sleeping Virgins (1968)
- Sweet Secret (1971)
- Rika 3: Juvenile's Lullaby (1973)

=== Producer only ===
- Epitome (1953)
- Life of a Woman (1953)

== Legacy ==
A retrospective on Yoshimura and Kaneto Shindō was held in London in 2012, organised by the British Film Institute and the Japan Foundation. From December 5 to 11, 2025, the retrospective "Kōzaburō Yoshimura: Tides of Emotion," showing 13 of the director's films, was organized at Film at Lincoln Center in New York City.
