= 2008 New York Film Festival =

46th New York Film Festival

- Opening film: The Class
- Closing film: The Wrestler
- Location: New York City, United States
- Founded: 1963
- Founded by: Richard Roud and Amos Vogel
- Hosted by: Film at Lincoln Center
- Artistic director: Richard Peña
- Festival date: September 26 – October 12, 2008
- Website: https://www.filmlinc.org/nyff/

New York Film Festival
- 2009 2007

The 46th New York Film Festival took place from September 26 to October 12, 2008, in New York City, presented by Film at Lincoln Center.

The festival's opening film was Laurent Cantet's The Class, Clint Eastwood's Changeling was the festival's centerpiece, while Darren Aronofsky's The Wrestler was the festival's closing film.

Appearing in NYFF's "Main Slate" for the first time were: Alexander Olch, Antonio Campos, Ari Folman, Brillante Mendoza, Laurent Cantet, Pablo Larraín, Sergey Dvortsevoy, and Steve McQueen.

In addition to screening the feature films, which were often preceded by short films, the festival ran a sidebar retrospective of the films of controversial Japanese filmmaker Nagisa Ōshima. The festival also included its twelfth annual series Views from the Avant-Garde, showcasing a variety of experimental films.

== Official Selections ==
The edition marked Richard Peña 20th year as NYFF's Artistic director. The selection committee was led by Peña (programming director of the Film Society of Lincoln Center), Kent Jones (editor-at-large of Film Comment and former associate programming director of the Film Society), Scott Foundas (chief film critic for L.A. Weekly), J. Hoberman (senior film critic at The Village Voice), and Lisa Schwarzbaum (film critic at Entertainment Weekly).

=== Main slate ===
The following films were selected:

| English Title | Original Title | Director(s) | Production Country |
|---|---|---|---|
| 24 City | 二十四城记 | Jia Zhangke | China |
| Afterschool | | Antonio Campos | United States |
| Ashes of Time Redux (1994) | 東邪西毒 | Wong Kar-wai | Hong Kong |
| Bullet in the Head | Tiro en la cabeza | Jaime Rosales | Spain |
| Changeling (centerpiece) | | Clint Eastwood | United States |
| Che (Part I: The Argentine and Part II: Guerilla) | | Steven Soderbergh | Spain, Germany, France, United States |
| Chouga | Shuga | Darezhan Omirbaev | France, Kazakhstan |
| A Christmas Tale | Un conte de Noël | Arnaud Desplechin | France |
| The Class (opening film) | Entre les murs | Laurent Cantet | France |
| Four Nights with Anna | Cztery noce z Anną | Jerzy Skolimowski | Poland, France |
| Gomorrah | Gomorra | Matteo Garrone | Italy |
| Happy-Go-Lucky | | Mike Leigh | United Kingdom |
| The Headless Woman | La mujer sin cabeza | Lucrecia Martel | Argentina, Spain, France, Italy |
| Hunger | | Steve McQueen | Ireland, United Kingdom |
| I'm Gonna Explode | Voy a explotar | Gerardo Naranjo | Mexico |
| Let It Rain | Parlez-moi de la pluie | Agnès Jaoui | France |
| Lola Montès (1955) (retrospective) | | Max Ophüls | France, West Germany |
| Night and Day | 밤과 낮 | Hong Sang-soo | South Korea |
| The Northern Land | A Corte do Norte | João Botelho | Portugal |
| Service | Serbis | Brillante Mendoza | Philippines, France |
| Summer Hours | L'heure d'été | Olivier Assayas | France |
| Tokyo Sonata | トウキョウソナタ | Kiyoshi Kurosawa | Japan |
| Tony Manero | | Pablo Larraín | Chile |
| Tulpan | Тюльпан | Sergey Dvortsevoy | Kazakhstan, Russia |
| Waltz with Bashir | ואלס עם באשיר | Ari Folman | Israel, France, Germany, United States, Finland, Switzerland, Belgium, Australia |
| Wendy and Lucy | | Kelly Reichardt | United States |
| The Windmill Movie | | Alexander Olch | United States |
| The Wrestler (closing film) | | Darren Aronofsky | United States |
Short films
| Cry Me a River | 河上的爱情 | Jia Zhangke | China |
| Deweneti | | Dyana Gaye | France, Senegal |
| Dust | | Baker Smith | United States |
| Gauge | | Alistair Banks Griffin | United States |
| I Don't Feel Like Dancing | | Joachim Dollhopf and Evi Goldbrunner | Germany |
| I Hear Your Scream | Ahendu nde sapukai (Oigo tu grito) | Pablo Lamar | Paraguay, Argentina |
| Love Is Dead | Rupture pour tous | Eric Capitaine | France |
| Maybe Tomorrow | Demain peut-être | Guilhem Amesland | France |
| Pal/Secam | | Dmitry Povolotsky | Russia |
| Quarry (1970) | | Richard P. Rogers | United States |
| Ralph | | Alex Winckler | United Kingdom |
| Security | | Lars Henning | Germany |
| Surprise! | | Fabrice Maruca | France |
| This Is Her | | Katie Wolfe | New Zealand |
| Unpredictable Behaviour | | Pasha Shapiro and Ernst Weber | United States |
| Wait for Me | | Ross Kauffman | United States |

=== Special Events ===
The following films were selected:

| English Title | Original Title | Director(s) | Production Country |
|---|---|---|---|
| The Day Shall Dawn (1959) | جاگو ہوا سویرا | A. J. Kardar | Pakistan |
| It's Hard Being Loved by Jerks | C'est dur d'être aimé par des cons | Daniel Leconte | France |
| The Last Command (1928) | | Josef von Sternberg | United States |
| Pandora and the Flying Dutchman (1951) | | Albert Lewin | United Kingdom |

=== Retrospective ===
The following films were selected:

| English Title | Original Title | Director(s) | Production Country |
|---|---|---|---|
| 100 Years of Japanese Cinema (1994) | 百年日本映画 | Nagisa Ōshima | Japan, United Kingdom |
| Boy (1969) | 少年 | Nagisa Ōshima | Japan |
| The Catch (1961) | 飼育 | Nagisa Ōshima | Japan |
| The Ceremony (1971) | 儀式 | Nagisa Ōshima | Japan |
| Cruel Story of Youth (1960) | 青春残酷物語 | Nagisa Ōshima | Japan |
| Dear Summer Sister (1972) | 夏の妹 | Nagisa Ōshima | Japan |
| Death by Hanging (1968) | 絞死刑 | Nagisa Ōshima | Japan |
| Diary of a Shinjuku Thief (1969) | 新宿泥棒日記 | Nagisa Ōshima | Japan |
| Diary of a Yunbogi (1965) (short) | ユンボギの日記 | Nagisa Ōshima | Japan |
| Double Suicide: Japanese Summer (1967) | 無理心中日本の夏 | Nagisa Ōshima | Japan |
| Empire of Passion (1978) | 愛の亡霊 | Nagisa Ōshima | France, Japan |
| Gohatto (1999) | 御法度 | Nagisa Ōshima | Japan |
| In the Realm of the Senses (1976) | 愛のコリーダ | Nagisa Ōshima | Japan, France |
| Kyoto, My Mother's Place (1991) | キョート・マイ・マザーズ・プレイス | Nagisa Ōshima | Japan |
| The Man Who Left His Will on Film (1970) | 東京戦争戦後秘話 | Nagisa Ōshima | Japan |
| Max mon amour (1986) | | Nagisa Ōshima | France, United States, Japan |
| Merry Christmas, Mr. Lawrence (1983) | 戦場のメリークリスマス | Nagisa Ōshima | Japan, United Kingdom, New Zealand |
| Night and Fog in Japan (1960) | 日本の夜と霧 | Nagisa Ōshima | Japan |
| The Pleasures of the Flesh (1965) | 悦楽 | Nagisa Ōshima | Japan |
| The Rebel (1962) | 天草四郎時貞 | Nagisa Ōshima | Japan |
| Sing a Song of Sex (1967) | 日本春歌考 | Nagisa Ōshima | Japan |
| The Sun's Burial (1960) | 太陽の墓場 | Nagisa Ōshima | Japan |
| Tales of the Ninja (1967) | 忍者武芸帳 | Nagisa Ōshima | Japan |
| Three Resurrected Drunkards (1968) | 帰って来たヨッパライ | Nagisa Ōshima | Japan |
| A Town of Love and Hope (1959) | 愛と希望の街 | Nagisa Ōshima | Japan |
| Violence at Noon (1966) | 白昼の通り魔 | Nagisa Ōshima | Japan |
