= Japanese New Wave =

Japanese film movement

- Years active: Late 1950s – 1970s
- Location: Japan
- Major figures: Shōhei Imamura; Nagisa Ōshima; Hiroshi Teshigahara; Masahiro Shinoda; Seijun Suzuki; Susumu Hani; Koreyoshi Kurahara; Yasuzo Masumura; Yoshishige Yoshida; Shūji Terayama; Kaneto Shindo; Masaki Kobayashi; Toshio Matsumoto; Koji Wakamatsu; Yuzo Kawashima; Akio Jissoji; Kazuo Kuroki
- Influences: Nouvelle Vague, Japanese Proletarian literature, Shinkankakuha, Ero guro nansensu, Seitō, Japanese New Left

The Japanese New Wave (ヌーベルバーグ, Nūberu bāgu; Japanese transliteration of the French term "nouvelle vague") is a group of loosely-connected Japanese films and filmmakers between the late 1950s and part of the 1970s. The most prominent representatives include directors Nagisa Ōshima, Yoshishige Yoshida, Masahiro Shinoda and Shōhei Imamura.

== History ==
The term New Wave was coined after the French Nouvelle vague, a movement which had challenged the traditions of their national cinema in style and content, countering established narratives and genres with "the ambiguous complexities of human relationships" and polished techniques with deliberately rough ones, and introducing the theory that directors should be the auteurs of their films.

Unlike the French counterpart, the Japanese New Wave originated within the film studio establishment, especially Shochiku, whose head Shirō Kido hoped that "cheaply made, innovative pictures could emulate the success of the Nouvelle Vague in Europe". This policy saw the emergence of filmmakers like Nagisa Ōshima, Yoshishige Yoshida, and Masahiro Shinoda (all three Shochiku employees). Important early examples of the Shochiku New Wave were Cruel Story of Youth and Night and Fog in Japan (both 1960, dir. Ōshima), Blood Is Dry (1960, dir. Yoshida) and Dry Lake (1960, dir. Shinoda). Pigs and Battleships, released by Nikkatsu the following year, exemplified Shōhei Imamura's status as a director of the New Wave. The (possible) influences on these filmmakers are diverse: While Ōshima's antecedents have been seen in the theories of Vsevolod Meyerhold and Bertolt Brecht, and in the Japanese Leftist theatre (an influence of Jean-Luc Godard on Ōshima has been alleged, but also questioned), Yoshida was an outspoken admirer of Michelangelo Antonioni and Ingmar Bergman.

Kido soon withdrew his support for these films (either due to commercial failure, according to film scholar Alexander Jacoby, or due to the uncompromising political content of Ōshima's films, according to historian Donald Richie). By the mid-1960s, Ōshima, Yoshida and Shinoda had all left Shochiku and produced their films independently, as did Imamura. At the same time, Ōshima and Yoshida were the representatives of the New Wave who rejected both the term and the notion of a "movement" the most rigorously.

Other directors associated with the New Wave included Hiroshi Teshigahara, Toshio Matsumoto and former documentary filmmaker Susumu Hani. Hani directed his works almost entirely outside of the major studios, and favored non-actors and improvisation when possible. The documentaries Hani had made during the 1950s (Children in the Classroom and Children Who Draw) had introduced a style of cinéma vérité documentary to Japan, and were of great interest to other filmmakers. Kon Ichikawa, Yasuzō Masumura and Seijun Suzuki have also been encompassed with the term. Masumura's debut film Kisses (1957) has often been cited as a precursor of the New Wave and had been received enthusiastically by Ōshima upon its release. In addition, Film scholar David Desser placed director Kaneto Shindō next to Masumura as a "crucial" (Desser) predecessor and contemporary of the New Wave.

Themes addressed by the New Wave included radical politics, juvenile delinquency, uninhibited sexuality, changing roles of women in society, LGBTQI+ culture, racism and the position of ethnic minorities in Japan. The Art Theatre Guild, originally co-initiated and co-financed by Toho to distribute foreign art films, became an important factor in the distribution of these films, sometimes also acting as producer.

As funding outside of the studio system became increasingly difficult in the 1970s, with the big studios finding themselves in a decline (largely owed to television), the Japanese New Wave began to come apart. While Ōshima had to look for investors outside of Japan, Imamura and Hani switched to documentary filmmaking for television, and Shinoda retreated to "academic" (Jacoby) adaptations of classic literature.

== Films associated with the Japanese New Wave ==
1950s

- 1956: Children Who Draw, Susumu Hani (documentary)
- 1956: Punishment Room, Kon Ichikawa
- 1956: Crazed Fruit, Kō Nakahira
- 1957: Kisses, Yasuzō Masumura
- 1958: Giants and Toys, Yasuzō Masumura
- 1959: The Assignation, Kō Nakahira
- 1959: A Town of Love and Hope, Nagisa Ōshima

1960s

- 1960: Cruel Story of Youth, Nagisa Ōshima
- 1960: The Sun's Burial, Nagisa Ōshima
- 1960: Night and Fog in Japan, Nagisa Ōshima
- 1960: Naked Island, Kaneto Shindō
- 1960: The Warped Ones, Koreyoshi Kurahara
- 1960: Blood Is Dry, Yoshishige Yoshida
- 1960: Dry Lake, Masahiro Shinoda
- 1961: Bad Boys, Susumu Hani
- 1961: Pigs and Battleships, Shōhei Imamura
- 1961: The Catch, Nagisa Ōshima
- 1962: The Revolutionary, Nagisa Ōshima
- 1962: Pitfall, Hiroshi Teshigahara
- 1962: Harakiri, Masaki Kobayashi
- 1963: She and He, Susumu Hani
- 1963: The Insect Woman, Shōhei Imamura
- 1964: Intentions of Murder, Shōhei Imamura
- 1964: Assassination, Masahiro Shinoda
- 1964: Pale Flower, Masahiro Shinoda
- 1964: Onibaba, Kaneto Shindō
- 1964: Gate of Flesh, Seijun Suzuki
- 1964: Tattooed Life, Seijun Suzuki
- 1964: Woman in the Dunes, Hiroshi Teshigahara
- 1964: Kwaidan, Masaki Kobayashi
- 1965: The Song of Bwana Toshi, Susumu Hani
- 1965: Sea of Youth, Shinsuke Ogawa (documentary)
- 1965: With Beauty and Sorrow, Masahiro Shinoda
- 1965: A Story Written with Water, Yoshishige Yoshida
- 1966: Bride of the Andes, Susumu Hani
- 1966: The Pornographers: An Introduction to Anthropology, Shōhei Imamura
- 1966: Emotion, Nobuhiko Obayashi
- 1966: Violence at Noon, Nagisa Ōshima
- 1966: Fighting Elegy, Seijun Suzuki
- 1966: Tokyo Drifter, Seijun Suzuki
- 1966: The Face of Another, Hiroshi Teshigahara
- 1966: Silence Has No Wings, Kazuo Kuroki
- 1967: A Man Vanishes, Shōhei Imamura
- 1967: The Oppressed Students, Shinsuke Ogawa (documentary)
- 1967: Manual of Ninja Arts, Nagisa Ōshima
- 1967: A Treatise on Japanese Bawdy Songs, Nagisa Ōshima
- 1967: Branded to Kill, Seijun Suzuki
- 1968: Inferno of First Love, Susumu Hani
- 1968: Profound Desires of the Gods, Shōhei Imamura
- 1968: Summer in Narita, Shinsuke Ogawa (documentary)
- 1968: Death by Hanging, Nagisa Ōshima
- 1968: Three Resurrected Drunkards, Nagisa Ōshima
- 1968: The Man Without a Map, Hiroshi Teshigahara
- 1969: Aido, Susumu Hani
- 1969: Ryakushō Renzoku Shasatsuma, Adachi Masao
- 1969: Eros Plus Massacre, Yoshishige Yoshida
- 1969: Funeral Parade of Roses, Toshio Matsumoto
- 1969: Diary of a Shinjuku Thief, Nagisa Ōshima
- 1969: Double Suicide, Masahiro Shinoda
- 1969: Go, Go Second Time Virgin, Kōji Wakamatsu

1970s

- 1970: History of Postwar Japan as Told by a Bar Hostess, Shōhei Imamura (documentary)
- 1970: The Man Who Left His Will on Film, Nagisa Ōshima
- 1970: Heroic Purgatory, Yoshishige Yoshida
- 1970: Buraikan, Masahiro Shinoda
- 1970: Evil Spirits in Japan, Kazuo Kuroki
- 1970: This Transient Life, Akio Jissoji
- 1971: Red Army, Adachi Masao
- 1971: The Ceremony, Nagisa Ōshima
- 1971: Mandala, Akio Jissoji
- 1971: Throw Away Your Books, Rally in the Streets, Shūji Terayama
- 1971: Emperor Tomato Ketchup, Shūji Terayama
- 1971: Summer Soldiers, Hiroshi Teshigahara
- 1972: Dear Summer Sister, Nagisa Ōshima
- 1972: Ecstasy of the Angels, Kōji Wakamatsu
- 1972: Poem, Akio Jissōji
- 1972: The Morning Schedule, Susumu Hani
- 1973: Karayuki-san, the Making of a Prostitute, Shōhei Imamura (documentary)
- 1973: Coup d'État, Yoshishige Yoshida
- 1973: The Petrified Forest, Masahiro Shinoda
- 1974: Pastoral: To Die in the Country, Shūji Terayama
- 1974: Himiko, Masahiro Shinoda
- 1974: Ryoma Ansatsu, Kazuo Kuroki

== See also ==
- Art Theatre Guild
- Japanese New Left
- Angura
