= List of drama films of the 1960s =

This is a list of drama films of the 1960s.

== 1960 ==
- L'avventura
- Ballad of a Soldier
- Breathless
- Cruel Story of Youth
- Devi
- Elmer Gantry
- The Entertainer
- Her Brother
- The Human Condition, Part 2: The Road to Eternity
- Inherit the Wind
- Late Autumn
- Night and Fog in Japan
- Rocco and His Brothers
- The Sundowners
- Sunrise at Campobello
- The Sun's Burial
- Le Trou
- Two Women
- The Virgin Spring
- When a Woman Ascends the Stairs

== 1961 ==
- Accattone
- Ada
- The Children's Hour
- Connection
- Human Condition, Part 3: A Soldier's Prayer
- The Hustler
- The Island
- Judgment at Nuremberg
- Last Year at Marienbad
- Lola
- The Misfits
- A Raisin in the Sun
- Splendor in the Grass
- A Taste of Honey
- Through a Glass Darkly
- We Were Young
- Yojimbo

== 1962 ==
- Advise & Consent
- All Fall Down
- Billy Budd
- Birdman of Alcatraz
- Cleo from 5 to 7
- Days of Wine and Roses
- L'eclisse
- Harakiri
- The Intruder
- Jules and Jim
- Knife in the Water
- Lawrence of Arabia
- Lolita
- The Loneliness of the Long Distance Runner
- Lonely are the Brave
- Long Day's Journey into Night
- The Miracle Worker
- My Life to Live
- Ningen
- Pitfall
- Requiem for a Heavyweight
- To Kill a Mockingbird
- Winter Light

== 1963 ==
- An Actor's Revenge
- America, America
- Contempt
- Le Feu Follet
- High and Low
- Hud
- The Leopard
- Lilies of the Field
- Lord of the Flies
- Muriel
- Raven's End
- The Servant
- Shock Corridor
- The Silence
- Smrt Si Rika Engelchen
- This Sporting Life
- Vidas Secas

== 1964 ==
- Black God, White Devil
- The Carpetbaggers
- Charulata
- Gamlet
- Gate of Flesh
- Gertrud
- The Gospel According to St. Matthew
- I Am Cuba
- Intentions of Murder
- The Night of the Iguana
- Nothing But a Man
- One Potato, Two Potato
- The Pawnbroker
- The Pumpkin Eater
- Red Desert
- Séance on a Wet Afternoon
- Zorba the Greek

== 1965 ==
- The Agony and the Ecstasy
- Chimes at Midnight
- The Cincinnati Kid
- The Greatest Story Ever Told
- Othello
- The Round-Up
- Shadows of Forgotten Ancestors
- Ship of Fools
- The Shop on Main Street
- The Sound of Music

== 1966 ==
- 7 Women
- Akai Tenshi
- Andrei Rublev
- The Battle of Algiers
- Au Hasard Balthazar
- Masculin, féminin
- Persona
- Two or Three Things I Know About Her
- Violence at Noon
- Who's Afraid of Virginia Woolf?
- Wings
- Yesterday Girl
- Young Torless

== 1967 ==
- The ABC of Love
- Accident
- Belle de jour
- Bonnie and Clyde
- The Commissar
- Cool Hand Luke
- Far From the Madding Crowd
- I Am Curious (Yellow)
- In Cold Blood
- A Man Vanishes
- Marat/Sade
- Mouchette
- Rece do góry
- The Red and the White
- Skupljaci Perja
- The Trip

== 1968 ==
- Faces
- The Heart Is a Lonely Hunter
- Here, Beneath the North Star
- I Am Curious (Blue)
- If....
- Lost Sex
- Memories of Underdevelopment
- Nanami, The Inferno of First Love
- Rachel, Rachel
- Romeo and Juliet
- Shame
- The Swimmer
- The Unfaithful Wife
- Witchfinder General

== 1969 ==
- Anne of the Thousand Days
- Blind Beast
- The Color of Pomegranates
- The Damned
- Double Suicide
- Easy Rider
- Fellini Satyricon
- A Gentle Woman
- Katzelmacher
- Kes
- Learning Tree
- Love Is Colder Than Death
- Medium Cool
- The Prayer for Katarina Horovitzova
- The Prime of Miss Jean Brodie
- Retaliation
- They Shoot Horses, Don't They?
- This Man Must Die
- A Touch of Zen
- Women in Love
