= Kei Satō =

Japanese actor (1928–2010)

- 佐藤 慶
- Born: Keinosuke Satō (佐藤 慶之助); December 21, 1928; Aizuwakamatsu, Fukushima Prefecture, Japan
- Died: May 2, 2010 (aged 81); Tokyo, Japan
- Occupations: Actor, narrator
- Years active: 1952–2008

Kei Satō (佐藤 慶, Satō Kei; born December 21, 1928 in Aizuwakamatsu – May 2, 2010) was a Japanese character actor and narrator. He is known for his work with Japanese New Wave director Nagisa Oshima, and for several films with Kaneto Shindo, such as Onibaba and Kuroneko. He won the best actor award from Kinema Junpo for the films The Ceremony and Nihon no akuryō. He also worked as a narrator for many documentaries, both on television and film.

== Provenance ==
The Sato family was an ancestral Aizu Domain samurai, and after losing the Boshin War, they ran a wholesale business of lacquerware materials. In addition, Kinuko, the wife of Zensuke Shibukawa, who participated in the February 26 incident and died in prison, is an aunt.

After graduating from the dyeing and weaving department of Fukushima Prefectural Aizu Technical School (currently Fukushima Prefectural Aizu Technical High School), while working at the Aizuwakamatsu City Hall Family Register Section

In his early days as an actor, before his success in The Human Condition, he supported himself by producing gariban hand-written mimeographs, and he maintained his interest in hand-printing to the end of his life.

In 1981 he appeared in the film Daydream performing an unsimulated sex scene with actress Kyoko Aizome. The involvement of a mainstream actor in a hardcore film made good press coverage and brought audiences to the theater "in droves".

Due to his physical condition, he began to refrain from working after the age of 80. He died at 4:19 p.m. on May 2, 2010 at a hospital in Tokyo due to pneumonia at the age of 81.

== Filmography ==
=== Films ===
Date	Title	Role	Notes
1959	The Human Condition II: Road to Eternity	Shinjo	
1960	Cruel Story of Youth	Akira Matsuko	
1960	The Sun's Burial	Sakaguchi	
1960	Night and Fog in Japan	Sakamaki	
1962	Harakiri	Masakatsu Fukushima	
1962	Ningen	Hachizo	
1962	Pitfall		
1963	Bushido, Samurai Saga		
1963	Brave Records of the Sanada Clan	Ōno Harunaga	
1963	League of Gangsters	Takamoto	
1964	Onibaba	Hachi	
1964	Kwaidan	Ghost samurai	Segment: "In a Cup of Tea" ("Chawan no naka")
1965	Akumyo Nobori	Endo	
1965	Samurai Spy	Takanosuke Nojiri, lieutenant	
1965	Pleasures of the Flesh	Police inspector	
1966	Violence at Noon	Eisuke Oyamada	
1966	The Sword of Doom	Kamo Serizawa	
1966	Zatoichi's Vengeance	Boss Gonzo	
1967	Band of Ninja	Sakagami Shuzen (voice)	
1967	Japanese Summer: Double Suicide	Otoko	
1968	Death by Hanging	Prison warden	
1968	Kuroneko	Raiko	
1968	Diary of a Shinjuku Thief	Actor Kei Satō	
1968	Three Resurrected Drunkards	Y Chong-iru - I Chong-il	
1968	Hymn to a Tired Man	Suzuki	
1970	Onna Gokuakuchō		
1971	The Ceremony	Sakurada Kazuomi	
1971	Inn of Evil		
1972	Dear Summer Sister	Shinkō Kuniyoshi	
1973	Zatoichi's Conspiracy	Magistrate	
1973	Hanzo the Razor: The Snare	Shobei Hamajima	
1976	Yakuza Graveyard		
1978	Satsujin Yugi		
1978	Empire of Passion	(uncredited)	
1979	The Resurrection of the Golden Wolf	Shimizu	
1979	The Man Who Stole the Sun	Dr. Ichikawa	
1981	Daydream	Dentist	
1981	Imperial Navy	Shigenori Kami	
1983	International Military Tribunal for the Far East	Narrator	
1984	Godzilla 1985	Chief Editor Gondo	
1991	No Worries on the Recruit Front		
1999	Spellbound	Takashi Hisayama	
1999	Gohatto	Narrator	
2005	The Whispering of the Gods	Father Togawa	
2009	Kaiji: The Ultimate Gambler	Kazutaka Hyōdō	

=== Television ===
Year	Title	Role	Network	Notes	Ref.
1965	Taikōki	Akechi Mitsuhide	NHK	Taiga drama	
1967	Shiroi Kyotō	Goro Zaizen	NET	Lead role	
1973	The Water Margin	Cao Chiu	NTV		
1974	Unmeitōge	Asahina Genzaemon	KTV	Episode 11	
1974–75	Karei-naru Ichizoku	Ataru Mima	NET		
1983	Tokugawa Ieyasu	Takeda Shingen	NHK	Taiga drama	
1984	Sanga Moyu	Ryūkichi Tanaka	NHK	Taiga drama	
1984	Mujaki na Kankei		TBS		
1985–86	Sanada Taiheiki		NHK		
1986	Byakkotai	Tanaka Tosa	NTV		
1988	Takeda Shingen	Abe Katsuyoshi	NHK	Taiga drama	
1992	Nobunaga: King of Zipangu	Imai Sōkyū	NHK	Taiga drama	
1993–94	Homura Tatsu	Minamoto no Yoriyoshi	NHK	Taiga drama	
1995	Hachidai Shōgun Yoshimune	Arai Hakuseki	NHK	Taiga drama	
1996	Kenpō wa Madaka	Hitoshi Ashida	NHK	Miniseries	
2000	Aoi	Mashita Nagamori	NHK	Taiga drama	
2000–01	Honmamon		NHK	Asadora	
2007	Fūrin Kazan	Seiin	NHK	Taiga drama	
