= Sing a Song of Sex =

1967 Japanese avant-garde film

- Theatrical Poster
- Directed by: Nagisa Ōshima
- Written by: Nagisa Ōshima; Mamoru Sasaki; Tamura Tsutomu; Toshio Tajima
- Produced by: Masayuki Nakajima
- Starring: Ichirō Araki; Hiroshi Satō; Kazuyoshi Kushida; Kōji Iwabuchi; Juzo Itami; Akiko Koyama; Nobuko Miyamoto; Hideko Yoshida; Hiroko Masuda; Kazuko Tajima
- Cinematography: Akira Takada
- Edited by: Keiichi Uraoka
- Music by: Hikaru Hayashi
- Production company: Sozosha
- Distributed by: Shochiku
- Release date: 23 February 1967 (Japan)
- Running time: 103 minutes
- Country: Japan
- Language: Japanese

Sing a Song of Sex (Japanese: 日本春歌考, Hepburn: Nihon shunka-kō; lit. A Treatise on Japanese Bawdy Songs) is a 1967 Japanese New Wave musical film directed by Nagisa Ōshima. The Japanese title of the film derives from a book of the same name, a treatise on Japanese erotic songs written in 1966 by Tomomichi Soeda. Though there are four credited writers, much of the film was improvised by the actors. The story follows four high school seniors on their erotic daydreams and peripatetic outings across Tokyo after having taken their university entrance exams. They have one fateful night of drinking and singing with one of their teachers, who sings a bawdy song that becomes the main musical theme of the story.

The film, in avant-garde fashion, is more a collage of scenes than a coherent narrative. The director once said that the film is "about the imaginary." It is not pornographic and contains little nudity. It was screened at Harvard in 2008 as part of their "Nagisa Oshima and the Struggle for a Radical Cinema" program. The film appeared in Kinema Junpo's 1999 list of the 120 best Japanese films of all time as voted by film experts.

== Plot ==
The film opens with red liquid dripping on a red background. It is set on a specific day, February 11, 1967, the first date that National Foundation Day (the accession date of the legendary first Emperor of Japan) was celebrated in Japan as an annual holiday.

Four high school students have travelled to Tokyo on a snowy day to take their university entrance exams. They are Nakamura (Ichiro Araki), Ueda (Kōji Iwabuchi), Hiroi (Kazuyoshi Kushida) and Maruyama (Hiroshi Sato).

The boys are not politically engaged and openly mock both an anti-Vietnam petition request and a political march against National Foundation Day becoming a holiday.

One of the boys during his exam espies a pretty girl that he knows only as "Number 469" (her exam seat number), and the four become obsessed with her. They talk frequently about the girl and fantasize a plan to rape her. But even in their fantasies their desires are often thwarted.

They also join one of their high school teachers, Ōtake, and three other high school girls. In a restaurant, Ōtake, drunk, sings a short bawdy song and explains that "bawdy songs represent the voices of the oppressed." The four boys become smitten with the song, and it becomes the major musical theme of the film.

== Title ==
The film's Japanese title (Hepburn: Nihon shunka-kō) is more accurately translated as A Treatise on Japanese Bawdy Songs; however, the film has come to be mostly known as Sing a Song of Sex, due to its DVD release name.

== Cast ==
- Ichirō Araki as Toyoaki Nakamura
- Hiroshi Satō as Kōji Maruyama
- Kazuyoshi Kushida as Katsumi Hiroi
- Kōji Iwabuchi as Hideo Ueda
- Juzo Itami as Ōtake (Teacher)
- Akiko Koyama as Takako Tanigawa (Ōtake's lover)
- Nobuko Miyamoto as Sanae Satomi
- Hideko Yoshida as Sachiko Kaneda
- Hiroko Masuda as Satoko Ikeda
- Kazuko Tajima as Mayuko Fujiwara

== Themes ==
The film is a realization of Ōshima's philosophy that when desire runs up against its limits (e.g. against the realm of criminality), one needs to take a leap into the deeper realm of the imaginary. It is a dreamlike portrayal of the violence of frustrated male sexuality, with a background of protests against the war in Vietnam and against the state. It also explores generational conflict between a politically organized earlier generation and a more individualistic and rebellious younger generation.

=== Discrimination Against Koreans ===
Sing a Song of Sex is part of an unofficial trilogy of films that deal in part with the topic of Koreans in Japan. The other two are Death by Hanging and Three Resurrected Drunkards. The central female character of the film is Sachiko Kaneda, who is an ethnic Korean. In the folk songs rally, she interrupts an American song to sing a sexually themed song. The song's voice is that of a Korean prostitute attempting to lure Japanese customers for money, but the audience of young people cannot understand or empathize with her song; soon after that a number of the young men who had been previously playing music forcibly take her away and it's suggested that they try to rape her.

In the film’s final scene, Ōtake’s lover gives the four boys an impromptu lesson on the origins of the Japanese race. In it she argues that the Japanese imperial family descended wholly from Korean conquerors.

== Music ==
The film is a musical. Though many songs are sung one at a time, singing sometimes becomes competitive, with one singer or group of singers competing with another as they sing different songs simultaneously. There are over a dozen songs, among them are famous American songs sung in English, such as We Shall Overcome, Goodnight Irene, and This Land is Your Land.

Public, spontaneous, social singing is a custom of modern Japanese life. The fact that karaoke originated in Japan and is popular there is a testament to this fact. Karaoke singing is often a drunken activity, which parallels Ōtake's drunken singing. The main difference is that karaoke singers perform pre-recorded songs while in the film the characters engage in a more participatory social event, with songs that were passed from one generation to the next.

=== Main Theme ===
The main song of the film is Yosakoi Bushi, which the four protagonists often sing and improvise upon. This song is an example of shunka, a Japanese erotic folk song. The original lyrics are:

1. Let’s begin with the first case, ho, ho. When you do it with an only daughter, you have to get permission from her parents.

2. Let’s go on to the second case, ho, ho. When you do it with two sisters, you have to do it with the older sister first.

3. Let’s go on to the third case, ho, ho. When you do it with an ugly girl, you have to do it covering her with a wrapping cloth.

4. Let’s go on to the fourth case, ho, ho. When you do it on the second floor of someone else’s house, you have to do it without making a sound.

5. Let’s go on to the fifth case, ho, ho. When you do it with the same girl as usual, you have to do it like you normally do it.

6. Let’s go on to the sixth case, ho, ho. When you do it with an old acquaintance, you have to do it until you go weak in the knees.

7. Let’s go on to the seventh case, ho, ho. When you do it with a daughter of a pawnshop, you have to take it in and out.

8. Let’s go on to the eighth case, ho, ho. When you do it with a daughter of a greengrocer, you have to lay your head on a squash.

9. Let’s go on to the ninth case, ho, ho. When you do it with a daughter of a school principal, you have to do it being ready to be expelled from the school.

10. Let’s go on to the tenth case, ho, ho. When you do it with a noble person, you have to do it in haori and hakama (traditional Japanese male formal clothing).
