= Blood Is Dry =

1960 Japanese film

- Film poster
- Directed by: Yoshishige Yoshida
- Screenplay by: Yoshishige Yoshida
- Produced by: Takeshi Sasaki
- Starring: Keiji Sada; Shin'ichirō Mikami; Mari Yoshimura; Kaneko Iwasaki
- Cinematography: Tōichirō Narushima
- Edited by: Yoshi Sugihara
- Music by: Hikaru Hayashi
- Production company: Shochiku
- Distributed by: Shochiku
- Release date: 9 October 1960 (Japan)
- Running time: 87 minutes
- Country: Japan
- Language: Japanese

Blood Is Dry (Japanese: 血は渇いてる, Hepburn: Chi wa kawaiteru), also titled Blood Thirsty, is a 1960 Japanese drama film written and directed by Yoshishige Yoshida and starring Keiji Sada. It is Yoshida's second film and an early exponent of the Japanese New Wave.

== Plot ==
During a meeting, the executives of a small company in Tokyo announce the dismissal of the staff due to the strong competition. Salaryman Takashi pulls a gun and holds it against his temple, declaring that he doesn't care what happens to him as long as the company keeps his other colleagues. A shot is fired and Takashi wounded, but he recovers at the hospital after a few days. Yuki, an employee at the advertising department of a big life insurance company, has the idea to use Takashi for a new marketing campaign. Takashi, first reluctant, but under pressure for not being able to pay his rent, accepts and is marketed as a new "hero". The campaign is a huge success, and Takashi slowly takes a liking in his role of a man who conveys hope and optimism.

Harada, an acquaintance of Yuki who works for a sensationalist weekly magazine, is intent on destroying Takashi's image. He first sleeps with Takashi's wife Ikuyo and takes nude pictures of her, which Takashi buys back. When Harada gets his lover Yōko to pose nude with the drunk Takashi and has them published, Takashi pushes Harada in front of a car. As a consequence, the insurance company cancels the campaign and fires Takashi. Takashi confronts the company executives holding a gun against his temple, but is not taken seriously. Again a shot is fired, and this time Takashi dies of his wounds. The final scene shows Yuki and Harada looking on as a giant billboard with Takashi's portrait is taken down.

== Cast ==
- Keiji Sada as Takashi Kiguchi
- Shin'ichirō Mikami as Harada
- Mari Yoshimura as Yuki
- Kaneko Iwasaki as Ikuyo, Takashi's wife
- Masao Oda as Kanai
- Ichirō Sugai as company boss
- Yoshi Katō as executive
- Yūko Kashiwagi as Yōko
- Asao Sano as Mitsuzawa

== Release ==
Blood Is Dry was released on 9 October 1960 as part of a double bill with Nagisa Ōshima's Night and Fog in Japan. It was pulled out of the cinemas by producer and distributor Shochiku a few days later together with Ōshima's film in the wake of the assassination of Japanese Socialist Party politician Inejirō Asanuma by far right student Otoya Yamaguchi.

== Legacy ==
Blood Is Dry was screened at the Centre Pompidou, Paris, in 2008 and at the Harvard Film Archive in 2009 as part of retrospectives on Yoshida's work.

== Home media ==
Blood Is Dry was released on DVD in France in 2008 and in Japan in 2013 as part of DVD boxes with collected works by Yoshida.
