= Riichirō Manabe =

Japanese composer (1924–2015)

Riichirō Manabe (真鍋理一郎, Manabe Riichirō, 9 November 1924 – 29 January 2015) was a Japanese composer. He wrote scores for films of various genres like science fiction, horror, kaiju and drama films, including works of directors such as Nagisa Ōshima and Yūzō Kawashima.

== Filmography ==
- Suzaki Paradise: Red Light (1956)
- Hungry Soul (飢える魂) (1956)
- Summer Storm (夏の嵐, Natsu no arashi) (1956)
- Super Giant - The Artificial Satellite and the Destruction of Humanity (1957)
- Super Giant - The Spaceship and the Clash of the Artificial Satellite (1958)
- Kokoro to nikutai no tabi (完全な遊戯) (1958)
- Kanzenna yûgi (1958)
- Nora neko (1958)
- Noren (暖簾)(1958)
- Onna o wasurero (1959)
- Yoru no togyo (1959)
- High Teen (1959)
- Jigoku no magarikado (1959)
- A Town of Love and Hope (1959)
- Room for Let (Kashima ari) (1959)
- The Five Jolly Thieves (Shiranami gonin otoko: tenka no ô-dorobô) (1960)
- Hito mo arukeba (1960)
- Cruel Story of Youth (1960)
- The Sun's Burial (1960)
- Kenka Tarô (1960)
- Night and Fog in Japan (1960)
- Ponkotsu (1960)
- 'Akasaka no shimai' yori: yoru no hada (1960)
- Shôjo (1961)
- Romance Express (1961)
- Aoi me no sugao (1961)
- Kono wakasa aru kagiri (1961)
- Kill the Killer! (1961)
- Keishichô monogatari: jûni-nin no keiji (1961)
- Machi (1961)
- A Wife Confesses (1961)
- The Catch (1961)
- Urusai imôtotachi (1961)
- Shiro Amakusa, the Christian Rebel (1962)
- Heso no taisho (1962)
- Gang domei (1963)
- Fushigina Kusuri (Short) (1965)
- Hatoba no taka (1967)
- The Smell of Poison (1967)
- Kamo to negi (1968)
- Â Himeyuri no Tô (1968)
- Sogeki (1968)
- Front Row Life (1968)
- Fukushû no uta ga kikoeru (1968)
- Stormy Era (1969)
- Burakku comedi (1969)
- Oretachi no kôya (1969)
- Koto no taiyo (1969)
- Yakuza bangaichi (1969)
- Exiled to Hell (1969)
- Cruel Female Love Suicide (残酷おんな情死 Zankoku onna jōshi) (1970)
- Oiroke komikku (1970)
- Kigeki kudabare! Otoko-dama (1970)
- Terror in the Streets (1970)
- The Vampire Doll (1970)
- The Militarists (1970)
- Winter in Narita (Documentary) (1970)
- Profile of a Boss's Son (1970)
- Showa hito keta shachô tai futaketa shain (1971)
- Lake of Dracula (1971)
- Godzilla vs. Hedorah (1971)
- Zoku Showa hito keta shachô tai futaketa shain: Getsu-getsu kasui moku kinkin (1971)
- Hakuchô no uta nanka kikoenai (1972)
- Love Hunter (1972)
- Manatsu no Yoru no Jôji (1972)
- Wolf Guy (1973)
- Godzilla vs. Megalon (1973)
- Ame no yo no jôji (1973)
- Hitozuma: nokoribi (1973)
- Onna kyôshi: Amai seikatsu (1973)
- Hirusagari no jôji: Uwasa no kangofu (1974)
- Flower and Snake (1974)
- Evil of Dracula (1974)
- Okita Sôji (1974)
- The Gate of Youth (1975)
- Akan ni hatsu (1975)
- Kamome-yo, kirameku umi o mitaka/meguri ai (1975)
- The Possessed (1976)
- Boko! (1976)
- Gakusei mabu: shojo no aji (1976)
- The Gate of Youth Part 2 (1977)
- Shûdôjo Rushia: Kegasu (1978)
- Tatsu no ko Taro (1979)
- Jigoku (1979)
- Taiyo no ko teda no fua (1980)

== Sources ==
- Riichirō Manabe at IMDb
- "真鍋理一郎 (Manabe Riichirō)" (in Japanese). 2005. Archived from the original on 11 August 2006.
