= Yūsuke Kawazu =

Japanese actor (1935–2022)

- Kawazu's onscreen credit in the trailer for Kinoshita's The Snow Flurry
- Born: 12 May 1935; Tokyo, Japan
- Died: 26 February 2022 (aged 86)
- Occupation: Actor
- Years active: 1958–2022

Yūsuke Kawazu (Japanese: 川津 祐介, Hepburn: Kawazu Yūsuke; 12 May 1935 – 26 February 2022) was a Japanese actor.

== Life and career ==
Kawazu was born in Tokyo on 12 May 1935. While still a student at Keio University, Kawazu signed with Shochiku in 1958 and debuted in Kinoshita's The Eternal Rainbow. He became one of the studio's leading young stars, notably headlining Ōshima's Cruel Story of Youth in 1960. In later years he turned to character roles in film and television, also writing several books and establishing a reputation in calligraphy, painting, ceramics, and cooking. On 26 February 2022, he died of chronic heart failure at age 86.

== Selected filmography ==
=== Partial Filmography ===
- Cruel Story of Youth (1960)
- The River Fuefuki (1960)
- The Human Condition III: A Soldier's Prayer (1960)
- The Sun's Burial (1960)
- Killers on Parade (1961)
- Ken (1964)
- Manji (1964)
- Kiri no Hata (1965)
- Fighting Elegy (1966)
- Curse of the Blood (1968)
- Black Lizard (1968)
- Genocide (1968)
- Black Rose Mansion (1969) as Tsugawa
- Yakuza Zessyō (1970)
- Battle of Okinawa (1971)
- Young Girls in Love (1986)
- Godzilla vs. Mechagodzilla II (1993)
- Gamera 2: Attack of Legion (1996) as Akio Nojiri
- Gamera 3: The Revenge of Iris (1999) as Akio Nojiri
- Number Ten Blues (2013; filmed in 1975)

=== Television ===
- Taikōki (1965) as Maeda Toshiie
- Wild 7 (1972–1983) as Masaru Kusanami
- G-Men '75 (1979–1981) as Yoshiaki Nagumo
- Akō Rōshi (1979) as Heihachi Kobayashi
- Kinpachi-sensei (1980–1981) as Teacher Kamibayashi
- Tokugawa Ieyasu (1983) as Shima Sakon
- Under the Same Roof (1993) as Takao Sakaki
