= Sanada Taiheiki (TV series) =

1985–1986 Japanese television series

- Also known as: 真田太平記
- Genre: Jidaigeki
- Starring: Tsunehiko Watase; Masao Kusakari; Isao Natsuyagi; Kurara Haruka; Takaaki Enoki; Nakamura Hashinosuke III; Yuriko Kōno; Kumi Nakamura; Takao Itō; Yoshi Katō; Hiroshi Tsuburaya; Toshiyuki Hosokawa; Kei Satō; Misako Konno; Keiko Takeshita; Akiko Koyama; Mariko Okada; Nakamura Umenosuke IV; Tetsurō Tamba
- Theme music composer: Hikaru Hayashi
- Country of origin: Japan
- Original language: Japanese
- No. of episodes: 45

Production
- Running time: 45 minutes (per episode)
- Production company: NHK

Original release
- Network: NHK
- Release: April 3, 1985 – March 19, 1986

Sanada Taiheiki (真田太平記) is a Japanese television jidaigeki or period drama that was broadcast on NHK in 1985–1986. It is based on Shōtarō Ikenami's novel Sanada Taiheiki. The drama focuses on the history of the Sanada clan during the late Sengoku period. The complete DVD box is available.

== Plot ==
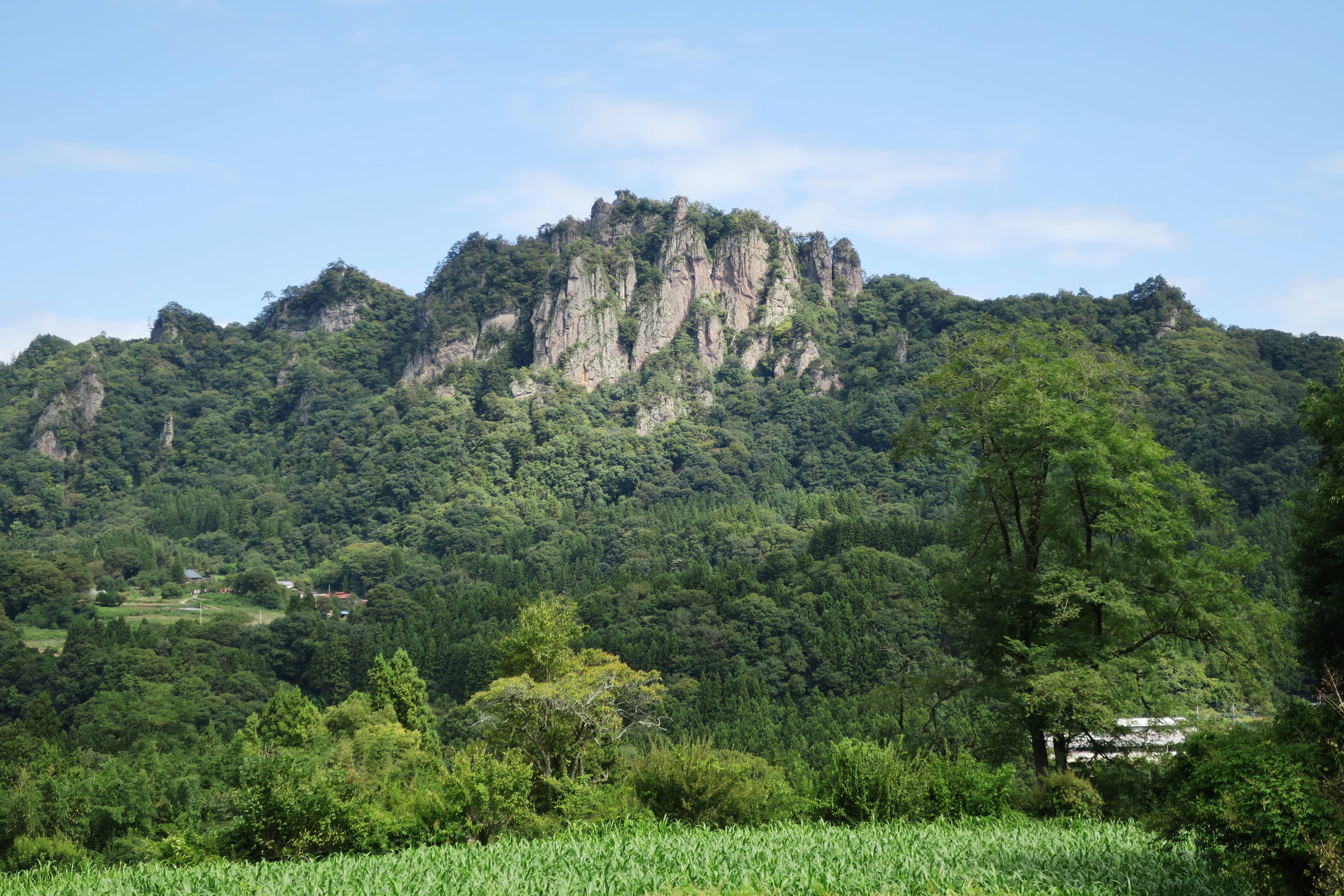
Iwabitsu mountain(Iwabitsu Castle)

In 1582, Oda and Tokugawa allied forces started an invasion of Takeda`s Kai Province. so the Takeda clan was in danger of extinction. Sanada Masayuki advised Takeda Katsuyori to abandon Kai Province and flee towards Masayuki`s Iwabitsu Castle. Katsuyori accepted his suggestion once, but he changed his mind and tried to flee towards Oyamada Nobushige`s Iwadono Castle, but was betrayed by Oyamada Nobushige and killed himself at Tenmokuzan. Having lost their lord, the Sanada clan unexpectedly became a small daimyo. The Sanada clan seeks a way to survive.

== Production ==
- Sword fight arranger - Kunishirō Hayashi

== Cast ==
=== Sanada Clan ===
- Tsunehiko Watase as Sanada Nobuyuki
- Masao Kusakari as Sanada Nobushige (Yukimura)
- Tetsuro Tamba as Sanada Masayuki
- Takaaki Enoki as Higuchi Kakubei
- Isao Natsuyagi as Tsubuya Matagorō
- Haruka Kurara as Oko
- Yoshi Katō as Yazawa Yoritsuna
- Akiko Koyama as Yamanote Dono
- Ryō Kinomoto as Mukai Saheiji
- Shinzō Hotta as Miyanotsuka Saizō
- Misako Konno as Komatsuhime
- Kumi Nakamura as Chikurin-in
- Kataoka Takatarō as Sanada Daisuke
- Yukiko Okada as Princess Okiku

=== Uesugi Clan ===
- Takao Itō as Uesugi Kagekatsu
- Makoto Shimotsuka as Naoe Kanetsugu

=== Tokugawa Clan ===
- Nakamura Umenosuke IV as Tokugawa Ieyasu
- Nakamura Baijaku II as Tokugawa Hidetada
- Takeshi Katō as Honda Tadakatsu
- Junpei Morita as Honda Tadamasa
- Akio Tanaka as Honda Masanobu
- Kantarō Suga as Ii Naomasa
- Rokko Toura as Ninja Nakayama Nagatoshi
- Kyosuke Machida as Ninja Ban Naganobu

=== Toyotomi Clan ===
- Hiroyuki Nagato as Toyotomi Hideyoshi
- Hiroshi Tsuburaya as Toyotomi Hideyori
- Masami Horiuchi as Toyotomi Hidetsugu
- Keiko Tsushima as Kōdai-in
- Mariko Okada as Yodo-dono
- Youki Kudoh as Senhime
- Kōji Shimizu as Ishida Mitsunari
- Makoto Yuasa as Shima Sakon
- Toshiyuki Hosokawa as Ōno Harunaga
- Kōichi Yamamoto as Katagiri Katsumoto
- Toshio Takahara as Nagai
- Yōsuke Kondō as Gotō Mototsugu
- Hiroshi Miyauchi as Mōri Katsunaga
- Koreharu Hisatomi as Chōsokabe Morichika

=== Takeda Clan ===
- Akiar Hiroshige Takeda Katsuyori
- Yūsuke Tozawa as Oyamada Nobushige

=== Later Hōjō clan ===
- Shōzō Fukuyama as Hōjō Ujimasa
- Jinya Satō as Hōjō Ujinao

=== Maeda Clan ===
- Shinsuke Mikimoto as Maeda Toshiie
- Hiroko Kōda as Maeda Matsu
- Hisayuki Nakajima as Maeda Toshinaga

=== The Eastern Army ===
- Raita Ryu as Katō Kiyomasa
- Nobuyuki Katsube as Fukushima Masanori
- Hirotarō Honda as Asano Yoshinaga

=== The Western Army ===
- Kunio Murai as Ōtani Yoshitsugu
- Akira Ishihama as Ukita Hideie
- Takahide Tashiro as Kobayakawa Hideaki
- Shōji Nakayama as Mōri Terumoto

=== Others ===
- Keiko Takeshita as Ono no Otsu
- Chiyonosuke Azuma as Yagyū Munetoshi
