= Boy (1969 film) =

1969 Japanese film by Nagisa Ōshima

- Film poster
- Directed by: Nagisa Ōshima
- Written by: Nagisa Ōshima
- Screenplay by: Tamura Tsutomu
- Produced by: Masayuki Nakajima; Takuji Yamaguchi
- Starring: Akiko Koyama; Fumio Watanabe; Tetsuo Abe
- Cinematography: Yasuhiro Yoshioka; Seizo Sengen
- Edited by: Keiichi Uraoka
- Music by: Hikaru Hayashi
- Production companies: Sozosha; Art Theater Guild
- Distributed by: Art Theater Guild
- Release date: July 26, 1969 (Japan)
- Running time: 97 minutes
- Country: Japan
- Language: Japanese

Boy (Japanese: 少年, Hepburn: Shōnen) is a 1969 Japanese film directed by Nagisa Ōshima, starring Tetsuo Abe, Akiko Koyama and Fumio Watanabe.

== Plot ==
Based on real events reported in Japanese newspapers in 1966 Boy follows the title character, Toshio Omura, across Japan, as he is forced to participate in a dangerous scam to support his dysfunctional family. Toshio's father, Takeo Omura, is an abusive, lazy veteran, who forces his wife, the boy's stepmother, Takeko Tamiguchi, to feign being hit by cars in order to shake down the motorists. When his wife is unable to perform the scam, Toshio is enlisted. The boy's confused perspective of the scams and his chaotic family life are vividly captured in precisely edited sequences. As marital strife, mounting abuse, and continual moving take their toll, the boy tries to escape, either by running away on trains, or by retreating into a sci-fi fantasy he has constructed for his little brother and himself. Finally, in snowy Hokkaidō, the law finally catches up when the little brother unwittingly causes a fatal car accident. Although traumatized, Toshio tries to help his family elude capture in the final sequence, presented in documentary fashion, describing their arrest.

== Cast ==
- Akiko Koyama as Takeko Taniguchi (the Stepmother)
- Fumio Watanabe as Takeo Omura (the Father)
- Tetsuo Abe as Toshio Omura (the Boy)

== Production ==
Upon reading about the real criminal family in 1966, director Nagisa Ōshima, attracted to the themes of youth and crime, within ten days had assembled a team to construct a film. Not until 1968 did a production company agree to fund the completed screenplay. In September, the 15 person crew began a mobile sequential on-location shoot described by Ōshima as cash-strapped and reliant on personal connections to complete, but marked by camaraderie and high spirits. The role of the boy was cast by searching in Tokyo children's homes, eventually finding the young orphan Tetsuo Abe. Abe's own life resembled the fractured childhood of the character he was to play, and he was allowed to join the production with the home's permission. Abe developed warm relationships with cast and crew, who tutored him while the film was being shot.

== Reception ==
Although popular at the box office, Boy disappointed some critics, who faulted its perceived humanism as a backward step from previous efforts like Death By Hanging and Violence at Noon that engaged with psychoanalysis and Brechtian effects. Poststructuralist film scholar Maureen Turim disputes this characterization, arguing for a continuation of Ōshima's theme of split subjectivity. The titular boy is between father and mother, "knowing and not-knowing," and paralyzed by fear of abandonment. The fantasy and the psyche figure prominently in the film, both in the boy's relationship to family, and in cinematic techniques like the use of the color red as a "focal point" suggesting the mother and loss.

Lead actor Tetsuo Abe never made another screen appearance, but his performance remains widely acclaimed with David Fear of The Village Voice writing that "his Toshio is simply trying to survive in a brave new world that has no place for those on the economic periphery...Oshima is the one who sets up Boy as a social case study and an exercise in using emotional distance as a tool for commentary. Abe is the boy who makes this masterpiece devastating."
