= Taikōki (TV series) =

1965 Japanese television series

- Genre: Taiga drama
- Written by: Sōsuke Mogi
- Directed by: Ei Okazaki etc
- Starring: Ken Ogata; Chieko Naniwa; Shiho Fujimura; Kōji Takahashi; Yūsuke Kawazu; Kei Satō; Kyū Sazanka; Nakamura Kamon II; Kōji Ishizaka; Takahiro Tamura; Frankie Sakai; Yoshiko Mita; Keiko Kishi
- Narrated by: Junnosuke Hiramitsu
- Theme music composer: Yoshirō Irino
- Opening theme: NHK Symphony Orchestra
- Country of origin: Japan
- Original language: Japanese
- No. of episodes: 52

Production
- Running time: 45 minutes

Original release
- Network: NHK
- Release: January 3 – December 26, 1965

Related
- Minamoto no Yoshitsune

Taikōki (太閤記) is a 1965 Japanese television series. It is the 3rd NHK taiga drama.

== Story ==
Taikōki deals with the Sengoku period. Based on Eiji Yoshikawa's novels "Shinsho Taikōki". Now only episode 42 exists, which depicted the Honnō-ji Incident.

The story chronicles the life of Toyotomi Hideyoshi from childhood to ruler of Japan.

NHK originally scheduled the Honnō-ji Incident for the 32nd episode to be aired on August 8, but due to the popularity of Kōji Takahashi's portrayal as Oda Nobunaga, they received letters from audience viewers asking them to "please don't kill Nobunaga". In response, the producers delayed the episode for two months, airing it on October 17 as the drama's 42nd episode. Furthermore, Nobunaga continued to appear in flashback scenes.

The average viewership across all episodes came to 31.2%, with the peak reaching 39.7% on October 17 with the 42nd episode.

== Production ==
- Sword fight arranger - Kunishirō Hayashi

== Cast ==
=== Toyotomi clan ===
- Ken Ogata as Toyotomi Hideyoshi
- Shiho Fujimura as Nene
- Yoshiko Mita as Lady Chacha
- Masakazu Tamura as Toyotomi Hidetsugu
- Chieko Naniwa as Naka
- Kōtarō Tomita as Toyotomi Hidenaga

=== Hideyoshi's vassals ===
- Kōji Ishizaka as Ishida Mitsunari
- Takahiro Tamura as Kuroda Kanbei
- Yoshiki Takahashi as Shōjumaru
- Yoshio Inaba as Katō Kiyotada
- Katsutoshi Atarashi as Katō Kiyomasa
- Kyū Sazanka as Hachisuka Koroku
- Yoshiyuki Fukuda as Takenaka Hanbei
- Gorō Wakamiya as Fukushima Masanori

=== Oda clan ===
- Kōji Takahashi as Oda Nobunaga
- Keiko Kishi as Oichi
- Kazuko Inano aa Nōhime
- Keiji Takamiya as Oda Nobutaka
- Masao Kageyama as Oda Nobukatsu

=== Nobunaga's vassals ===
- Jun Hamamura as Hirate Masahide
- Kazuyuki Inoue as Sakuma Nobumori
- Nakamura Kamon II as Shibata Katsuie
- Kei Satō as Akechi Mitsuhide
- Tatsuo Matsumura as Matsunaga Hisahide
- Yūsuke Kawazu as Maeda Toshiie
- Asao Koike as Araki Murashige
- Kataoka Takao as Mori Ranmaru
- Yoshio Kaneuchi as Ikeda Tsuneoki

=== Tokugawa clan ===
- Onoe Kikuzō VI as Tokugawa Ieyasu
- Takashi Toyama as Honda Tadakatsu
- Yasunori Irikawa as Okudaira Nobumasa
- Kazuo Kitamura as Torii Suneemon

=== Takeda clan ===
- Sessue Hayakawa as Takeda Shingen
- Fumio Watanabe as Takeda Katsuyori
- Kenjirō Uemura as Baba Nobuharu
- Shinjirō Asano as Anayama Baisetsu

=== Uesugi clan ===
- Kenjirō Ishiyama as Uesugi Kenshin
- Ichirō Izawa as Naoe Kagetsuna

=== Azai clan ===
- Katsumi Ōyama as Azai Nagamasa
- Terumi Niki as Ohatsu

=== Mōri clan ===
- Hiroshi Nihon'yanagi as Kikkawa Motoharu
- Shinsuke Mikimoto as Kikkawa Tsuneie
- Shōichi Kuwayama as Ankokuji Ekei
- Jun Tazaki as Shimizu Muneharu

=== Ashikaga clan ===
- Ichimura Kakitsu XVI as Ashikaga Yoshiaki
- Rokkō Toura as Hosokawa Fujitaka

=== Others ===
- Shōgo Shimada as Sen no Rikyū
- Kichijirō Ueda as Saitō Dōsan
- Ichirō Mikuni as Imagawa Yoshimoto
- Yoshio Tsuchiya as Sōtan
- Frankie Sakai as Ofuku
- Harue Akagi as Nagisa
- Shōbun Inoue as Date Masamune
- Shigeru Kōyama as Yamanaka Shikanosuke
- Seiji Miyaguchi as Dr. Manase Dōsan
- Nobuko Otowa as Oetsu, Fukushima Masanori's mother
