= Rokkō Toura =

Japanese actor (1937–1993)

- 戸浦六宏
- Born: Mutsuhiro Toura; 30 April 1930; Osaka, Japan
- Died: 25 March 1993 (aged 62); Tokyo, Japan
- Occupation: Actor
- Years active: 1960–1993

Rokkō Toura (戸浦 六宏, Toura Rokkō; 30 April 1937 – 25 March 1993) was a Japanese stage and film actor active from 1960 to 1993. He is mostly associated with the films of director Nagisa Ōshima.

== Life and career ==
Toura was born Mutsuhiro Toura in Osaka, Japan. A graduate of Kyoto University, he worked as an English teacher at a private high school before becoming an actor at the Shochiku studios at Ōshima's recommendation. He left Shochiku together with Ōshima the following year and became a freelance actor who often worked with Ōshima, but also repeatedly with director Kaneto Shindō.

Toura died of polyarteritis nodosa on 25 March 1993, at the age of 62.

== Selected filmography ==
=== Film ===
- The Sun's Burial (1960) as Masa
- Night and Fog in Japan (1960) as Higashiura
- Zatoichi and the Chess Expert (1965) as crippled yakuza
- Violence at Noon (1966) as Genji
- Japan's Longest Day (1967) as Shun'ichi Matsumoto
- Double Suicide: Japanese Summer (1967)
- Tales of the Ninja (1967) (voice)
- Diary of a Shinjuku Thief (1968) as himself
- Curse of the Blood (1968) as Fukaya Shinzaemon
- Death by Hanging (1968) as medical officer
- Kuroneko (1968) as a warlord
- Yokai Monsters: Along with Ghosts (1969) (narrator)
- Live Today, Die Tomorrow! (1970) as Gondo
- The Ceremony (1971) as Sakurada Mamoru
- Stray Cat Rock: Beat '71 (1971)
- Silence (1971) as interpreter
- Female Convict Scorpion: Jailhouse 41 (1972) as Ministry of Justice officer
- Dear Summer Sister (1972)
- Lone Wolf and Cub: Baby Cart in the Land of Demons (1973) as Oribe
- Bodigaado Kiba: Hissatsu sankaku tobi (1973) as Karasaki Gen
- Zero Woman: Red Handcuffs (1974) as Tani
- Military Comfort Women (1974) as Yamagami
- The Life of Chikuzan (1977) as Hikoichi
- Sanada Yukimura no Bōryaku (1979) as Ono Harunaga
- Edo Porn (1981)
- Merry Christmas, Mr. Lawrence (1983) as interpreter
- Early Spring Story (1985)
- Tree Without Leaves (1986) as bailiff
- Yearning (1993)

=== Television ===
- Akō Rōshi (1964) as Takebayashi Takashige
- Taikoki (1965) as Hosokawa Fujitaka
- Ten to Chi to (1969) as Suwa Yorishige
- Kunitori Monogatari (1973) as Shimozuma Rairen
- Katsu Kaishū (1974) as Takano Chōei
- Kusa Moeru as Minamoto no Yukiie
- Tokugawa Ieyasu as Hirate Masahide
- Unmeitōge (1974) as Yami no Hichibei
- Miyamoto Musashi (1985) as Sakai Tadatoshi
- Sanada Taiheiki (1985–86) as Ninja Nakayama Nagatoshi
