= Tales of the Ninja =

1967 Japanese film by Nagisa Ōshima

Tales of the Ninja (Band of Ninja)
- Theatrical release poster
- Directed by: Nagisa Ōshima
- Screenplay by: Nagisa Ōshima; Mamoru Sasaki
- Based on: Ninja Bugeicho Kagemaruden by Sanpei Shirato
- Produced by: Masayuki Nakajima; Nagisa Ōshima; Takuji Yamaguchi
- Starring: Kei Yamamoto; Akiko Koyama; Kei Satō; Fumio Watanabe; Hikaru Hayashi; Shigeru Tsuyuguchi
- Cinematography: Akira Takada
- Edited by: Sueko Shiraishi
- Music by: Hikaru Hayashi
- Distributed by: ATG
- Release date: February 15, 1967 (Japan)
- Running time: 123 minutes
- Country: Japan
- Language: Japanese

Tales of the Ninja (Japanese: 忍者武芸帳, Hepburn: Ninja Bugeichō) (also known as Band of Ninja) is a 1967 Japanese film directed by Nagisa Ōshima. It is based on Sanpei Shirato's manga Ninja Bugeichō. Rather than making an animated adaptation, Ōshima decided to simply shoot the panels of the manga in order, adding narration and employing zooming and panning techniques.

== Plot ==
The son of a murdered feudal lord meets a renegade ninja helping peasants and farmers rebel against Oda Nobunaga.

== Cast ==
- Yuki Jutaro - Kei Yamamoto
- Akemi - Akiko Koyama
- Oda Nobunaga- Hikaru Hayashi
- Toyotomi Hideyoshi - Fumio Watanabe
- Akechi Mitsuhide - Shigeru Tsuyuguchi
- Kagemaru - Rokko Toura
