= Yoshi Katō =

Japanese actor (1913–1988)

- Born: 12 January 1913; Shiba, Tokyo, Japan
- Died: 1 March 1988 (aged 75)
- Occupation: Actor
- Years active: 1934–1988
- Spouses: Isuzu Yamada (1950–1953); Masako Nakamura (1958–1985)

Yoshi Katō (加藤 嘉, Katō Yoshi; 12 January 1913 – 1 March 1988) was a Japanese stage and film actor who appeared in nearly 180 films between 1948 and 1988.

== Biography ==
After leaving Keiō Gijuku High School prematurely, Katō gave his stage debut in 1934. He later joined the Shinkyo Theatre Company, which was forced to disband by the authorities in 1940. After the war, he first became a member of the Mingei Theatre Company before moving to the Bungakuza Theatre Company.

In 1948, Katō gave his film debut in Kōzaburō Yoshimura's Waga shōgai no kagayakeru hi. In the following years, he worked for directors such as Keisuke Kinoshita, Kaneto Shindō and Satsuo Yamamoto, and regularly starred in films of Tadashi Imai.

Katō was married to actress Isuzu Yamada from 1950 to 1953.

== Selected filmography ==
=== Film ===
- Apostasy (1948)
- Vacuum Zone (1952)
- Hiroshima (1953)
- Tower of Lilies (1953)
- Dobu (1954)
- Mahiru no ankoku (1956)
- The Rice People (1957)
- Night Drum (1958)
- The River Fuefuki (1960)
- Blood Is Dry (1960)
- Zero Focus (1961)
- Hepcat in the Funky Hat (1961) as Kogure
- Immortal Love (1961)
- The Catch (1961)
- The Mad Fox (1962)
- Gang vs. G-Men (1962)
- Bushido, Samurai Saga (1963)
- A Legend or Was It? (1963)
- A Fugitive from the Past (1965)
- Shiroi Kyotō (1966)
- Portrait of Chieko (1967)
- Profound Desires of the Gods (1968)
- Broken Swords (1969)
- Blood Vendetta (1969)
- Yakuza Zessyō (1970)
- Silence (1971)
- Battles Without Honor and Humanity: Deadly Fight in Hiroshima (1973)
- Men and War Part III (1973)
- Himiko (1974)
- Castle of Sand (1974)
- Dragon Princess (1976)
- Torakku Yarō: Ippiki Otoko Momojirō (1977)
- Hometown (1983)
- Tampopo (1985)

=== Television ===
- Haru no Sakamichi (1971) as Maeda Toshiie
- Amigasa Jūbei (1974-1975)
- Shiroi Kyotō (1978) as Professor Ōkouchi
- The Yagyu Conspiracy (1978) as Date Masamune
- Sanada Taiheiki (1985-1986)

== Awards ==
- 1983: Mainichi Film Special Award for Hometown and lifetime achievement
- 1983: Best Actor Award at the 13th Moscow International Film Festival for Hometown
