= Diary of a Shinjuku Thief =

1969 film by Nagisa Ōshima

- Theatrical release poster
- Kanji: 新宿泥棒日記
- Revised Hepburn: Shinjuku Dorobō Nikki
- Directed by: Nagisa Ōshima
- Written by: Takeshi Tamura; Mamoru Sasaki; Masao Adachi; Nagisa Ōshima
- Produced by: Masayuki Nakajima
- Starring: Tadanori Yokoo; Rie Yokoyama; Kei Satō; Jūrō Kara; Moichi Tanabe; Tetsu Takahashi
- Cinematography: Yasuhiro Yoshioka; Sēzō Sengen
- Edited by: Nagisa Ōshima
- Production company: Sōzōsha
- Distributed by: Art Theatre Guild
- Release date: 15 February 1969 (Japan)
- Running time: 96 minutes
- Country: Japan
- Language: Japanese

Diary of a Shinjuku Thief (Japanese: 新宿泥棒日記, Hepburn: Shinjuku Dorobō Nikki) is a 1969 Japanese New Wave film co-written and directed by Nagisa Ōshima.

== Synopsis ==
The film centers around Birdie, a young Japanese book thief who is caught by a store clerk named Umeko. As their encounters grow increasingly fraught with tension and desire, the two become lovers and begin committing thefts together. They also take part in a kabuki play based on the lives of Yui Shōsetsu and Marubashi Chūya.

== Cast ==
- Tadanori Yokoo as Birdey Hilltop
- Rie Yokoyama as Umeko Suzuki
- Moichi Tanabe
- Tetsu Takahashi
- Kei Satō
- Rokko Toura as himself
- Fumio Watanabe as himself
- Jūrō Kara as himself / singer
- Reisen Ri

== Reception ==
Roger Greenspun of The New York Times called most of the film dull "with an air of having been produced only for purposes of demonstration", concluding that "the result is a high-powered sterility in the midst of much energetic busyness." The film was described by Ronald Bergan, in his Guardian obituary of Oshima, as "an explosive agitprop movie equating sexual liberation with revolution, whose impact has cooled only marginally."
