= Mamoru Sasaki =

Japanese screenwriter

Sasaki Mamoru
- 佐々木守
- Born: September 13, 1936; Ishikawa Prefecture, Japan
- Died: February 24, 2006 (aged 69)
- Occupations: Screenwriter; Author
- Notable work: Ultraman; Ultraseven; Iron King
- Relatives: Hajime Sasaki (nephew)

Mamoru Sasaki (佐々木守, Sasaki Mamoru; September 13, 1936 – February 24, 2006) was a Japanese TV and film screenwriter and author. He was born in Ishikawa Prefecture of Japan. He graduated from Meiji University.

== Script ==
=== TV programs ===
- some episodes of Ultraman
- some episodes of Ultra Seven
- some episodes of Monkey
- creator of Iron King

=== Films ===
- Tales of the Ninja (1967, co-writing)
- Double Suicide: Japanese Summer (1967, co-writing)
- Sing a Song of Sex (1967, co-writing)
- Death by Hanging (1968, co-writing)
- Three Resurrected Drunkards (1968, co-writing)
- Diary of a Shinjuku Thief (1969, co-writing)
- The Man Who Left His Will on Film (1970, co-writing)
- The Ceremony (1971, co-writing)
- Dear Summer Sister (1972, co-writing)

== Associates ==
- Akio Jissoji
- Nagisa Oshima
- Masao Adachi
- Ishidō Toshirō
- Tamura Takeshi
- Matsuda Masao
- Toshio Matsumoto
- Fusako Shigenobu
