= Unmeitōge =

- Also known as: 運命峠
- Genre: Jidaigeki
- Directed by: Takeshi Saito; Akira Inoue
- Starring: Masakazu Tamura; Naoko Otani; Goro Ibuki; Kei Satō; Jūshirō Konoe
- Narrated by: Takayuki Akutagawa
- Theme music composer: Hiroshi Miyagawa
- Country of origin: Japan
- Original language: Japanese
- No. of episodes: 21

Production
- Producer: Yasuo Nozoe
- Running time: 45 minutes (per episode)
- Production company: Toei

Original release
- Network: KTV
- Release: February 26 – October 2, 1974

Unmeitōge (運命峠, Fateful Mountain Pass) is a Japanese jidaigeki or period drama that was broadcast in prime-time in 1974. It is based on Renzaburō Shibata's novel of the same title. The lead star is Masakazu Tamura.

== Plot ==
Akizuki Rokurōta was born as a child of Tokugawa Ieyasu, but since he is a twin with Tokugawa Iemitsu he is not allowed an official place within the Tokugawa family. Sent away as an adopted son, he continues his wandering journey. One day, he accidentally encounters Toyotomi Hideyori's son Toyotomi Hideya, his mother Katsura-no-miya Renko and their maidservant Sasaka, survivors of the Shogunate attack on Osaka Castle years before who are now fleeing from their refuge in Kyoto. The Tokugawa Shogunate and Yagyū clan are trying to capture or kill them, while on the other hand villains want to use them. Akizuki Rokurōta decides to protect them from both sides.

== Cast ==
- Masakazu Tamura as Akizuki Rokurōta/Tokugawa Iemitsu
- Goro Ibuki as Yagyū Jūbei Mitsuyoshi
- Jūshirō Konoe as Yagyū Munenori
- Yoshio Yoshida as Tenkai
- Ichirō Arishima as Takuan Sōhō
- Naoko Otani as Renko
- Rokko Toura as Yami no Hichibei
- Yayoi Watanabe as Sasaka
- Kei Satō as Asahina Genzaemon
- Atsushi Watanabe as Iga Ninja Unten

== Other adaptations ==
Kōsei Saitō directed 3 hours special drama version which aired January 6, 1993 on Fuji TV. The lead role was played by Ken Matsudaira. theme music by Masahiko Satoh, Screen play by Motomu Furuta.

- Ken Matsudaira as Akizuki Rokurōta
- Tomokazu Miura as Miyamoto Musashi
- Shigeru Tsuyuguchi as Yagyū Munenori
- Hiroshi Abe as Yagyū Jūbei Mitsuyoshi
- Morio Kazama as Tokugawa Iemitsu
- Narumi Arimori
- Chiaki Matsubara
- Katsumasa Uchida
- Hirotarō Honda as Hanabusa Togo
- Hideji Ōtaki
- Yoichi Hayashi as Hattori Hanzō
- Shōhei Hino as Iga Ninja Unten
- Isao Natsuyagi as Katō Sōjurō
- Umenosuke Nakamura as Tenkai
