= Double Suicide: Japanese Summer =

1967 Japanese film by Nagisa Oshima

- Theatrical release poster
- Directed by: Nagisa Ōshima
- Screenplay by: Nagisa Ōshima; Takeshi Tamura; Mamoru Sasaki
- Produced by: Masayuki Nakajima
- Starring: Keiko Sakurai; Kei Satō; Masakazu Tamura; Taiji Tonoyama; Hôsei Komatsu; Rokko Toura
- Cinematography: Yasuhiro Yoshioka
- Edited by: Keiichi Uraoka
- Music by: Hikaru Hayashi
- Production company: Sōzōsha
- Distributed by: Shōchiku
- Release date: September 2, 1967 (Japan)
- Running time: 98 minutes
- Country: Japan
- Language: Japanese

Double Suicide: Japanese Summer (Japanese: 無理心中日本の夏, Hepburn: Muri shinju: Nihon no natsu) is a 1967 Japanese film directed by Nagisa Ōshima.

== Plot ==
Nejiko is a sex-obsessed girl. She happens to see yakuza members digging guns and swords buried underground and is imprisoned by them.

== Cast ==
- Keiko Sakurai as Nejiko
- Taiji Tonoyama as omocha (toy)
- Hōsei Komatsu as oni (demon)
- Kei Satō as otoko
- Masakazu Tamura as boy
- Rokkō Toura as televi (television)
