= The Catch (1961 film) =

1961 Japanese film by Nagisa Oshima

- Theatrical release poster
- 飼育
- Directed by: Nagisa Ōshima
- Written by: Tsutomu Tamura; Kenzaburō Ōe (novella)
- Produced by: Saburo Tajima; Masayuki Nakajima
- Starring: Rentarō Mikuni; Hugh Hurd
- Cinematography: Yoshiji Shakawa
- Edited by: Miyuri Miyamori
- Music by: Riichirō Manabe
- Production company: Palace Film Pro
- Distributed by: Taiho
- Release date: 22 November 1961 (Japan)
- Running time: 105 minutes
- Country: Japan
- Language: Japanese

The Catch (Japanese: 飼育, romanized: Shiiku, lit. 'Breeding') is a 1961 Japanese war drama film directed by Nagisa Ōshima. It is based on the prize-winning novella Shiiku (translated as The Catch or Prize Stock) by Kenzaburō Ōe.

== Plot ==
During the summer of 1945, a U.S. plane crashes in a rural Japanese area. The villagers capture the surviving black pilot and lock him in a stable, awaiting official instructions how to proceed with their prisoner. While waiting, seething conflicts in the community come to the surface. Takano, the domineering and abusive local landlord, uses the villagers' anger and frustrations, which they blame on the captive, to turn the attention away from his own misdeeds and eventually kills him. Shortly after, Japan's defeat is declared. The community decides to make deserter Jirō, who had been hiding in the woods to escape his draft, responsible for the incident. Jirō first agrees, but then rebels against the plan, and is accidentally killed in a subsequent fight. The last scene shows the burning of Jirō's and the captive's bodies, looked upon by Jirō's younger brother Hachiko, who had unsuccessfully tried to save the prisoner.

== Cast ==
- Rentarō Mikuni – Kazumasa Takano
- Hugh Hurd – American soldier
- Rokkō Toura – secretary
- Toshirō Ishidō – Jirō
- Yoshi Katō – Yoichi Kokubo
- Teruko Kishi – Masu Tsukada
- Akiko Koyama – Hiroko Ishii
- Yōko Mihara – Sachiko Tsukada
- Eiko Ōshima – Mikiko
- Isao Hirizumi – Hachiko

== Background ==
The Catch was Ōshima's first independently produced film after leaving the Shochiku studio.

== Awards ==
- Mainichi Film Award for best supporting actor Rentarō Mikuni for The Catch and Hadakakko

== Legacy ==
The Catch was presented at retrospectives on Ōshima at the Museum of Modern Art, the Berkeley Art Museum and Pacific Film Archive and the Harvard Film Archive. It was screened at the Tokyo International Film Festival in 2011.

Ōe's novella was again adapted in 2011 as Gibier d'élevage by director Rithy Panh, who transferred the setting to early 1970s Cambodia.

== Bibliography ==
- Ōe, Kenzaburo (1981). "The Catch". In Saeki, Shōichi (ed.). The Catch and Other War Stories. Kodansha International. ISBN 9780870114571.
- Ōe, Kenzaburo (1977). "Prize Stock". Teach Us to Outgrow Our Madness. Grove Press. ISBN 978-0-8021-5185-8.
