= Empire of Passion =

1978 French film by Nagisa Ōshima

- Film poster
- Directed by: Nagisa Ōshima
- Written by: Nagisa Ōshima; Itoko Nakamura
- Produced by: Anatole Dauman; Shigeru Wakatsuki
- Starring: Kazuko Yoshiyuki; Tatsuya Fuji; Takahiro Tamura; Takuzo Kawatani; Akiko Koyama
- Cinematography: Yoshio Miyajima
- Edited by: Keiichi Uraoka
- Music by: Toru Takemitsu
- Production company: Oshima Nagisa Production
- Distributed by: Toho Towa
- Release date: 1978
- Running time: 108 minutes
- Countries: Japan; France
- Language: Japanese
- Box office: 276,040 tickets (France)

Empire of Passion (Japanese: 愛の亡霊, Hepburn: Ai no Bōrei) is a 1978 Japanese-French drama horror romance film produced, written and directed by Nagisa Ōshima, based on a novel by Itoko Nakamura. The film was a co-production between Oshima Prods. and Argos Films.

== Plot ==
In 1895 a rickshaw runner arrives home in a village in Japan. His wife Seki is sexually assaulted by a young neighbour, Toyoji. They became lovers. He's very jealous of Seki's husband and decides that they should kill him. One night, after the husband has had plenty of shōchū to drink and is in bed, they strangle him and dump his body down a well. To avert any suspicions, Seki pretends her husband has gone off to Tokyo to work. For three years Seki and Toyoji secretly see each other. Their relationship has moments of intense passion, but the young man starts to distance himself from Seki. Finally, suspicions in the village become very strong and people begin to gossip. To make matters worse, her husband's ghost begins to haunt her and the law arrives to investigate her husband's disappearance.

== Cast ==
- Tatsuya Fuji - Toyoji
- Kazuko Yoshiyuki - Seki
- Takahiro Tamura - Gisaburo
- Takuzo Kawatani - Inspector Hotta
- Akyoshi Fujiwara
- Masami Hasegawa - Oshin
- Kenzo Kawarazaki
- Tatsuya Kimura
- Eizo Kitamura
- Akiko Koyama - Mother of Landowner
- Osugi - Dancer
- Sumie Sasaki - Odame
- Takaki Sugiura
- Rinichi Yamamoto
- Taiji Tonoyama - Toichiro

== Release and honours ==
Empire of Passion was Japan's submission to the 51st Academy Awards for the Academy Award for Best Foreign Language Film, but was not accepted as a nominee. The film was entered into the 1978 Cannes Film Festival, where Ōshima won the award for Best Director. It was released on DVD by Fox Lorber Films in 2000 under the title In the Realm of Passion.

The film "was Oshima's only true kaidan (Japanese ghost story)" and is described as "a savage, unrelenting experience".

== See also ==
- Cinema of Japan
- List of submissions to the 51st Academy Awards for Best Foreign Language Film
- List of Japanese submissions for the Academy Award for Best Foreign Language Film
