= Fumio Watanabe =

Japanese actor (1929–2004)

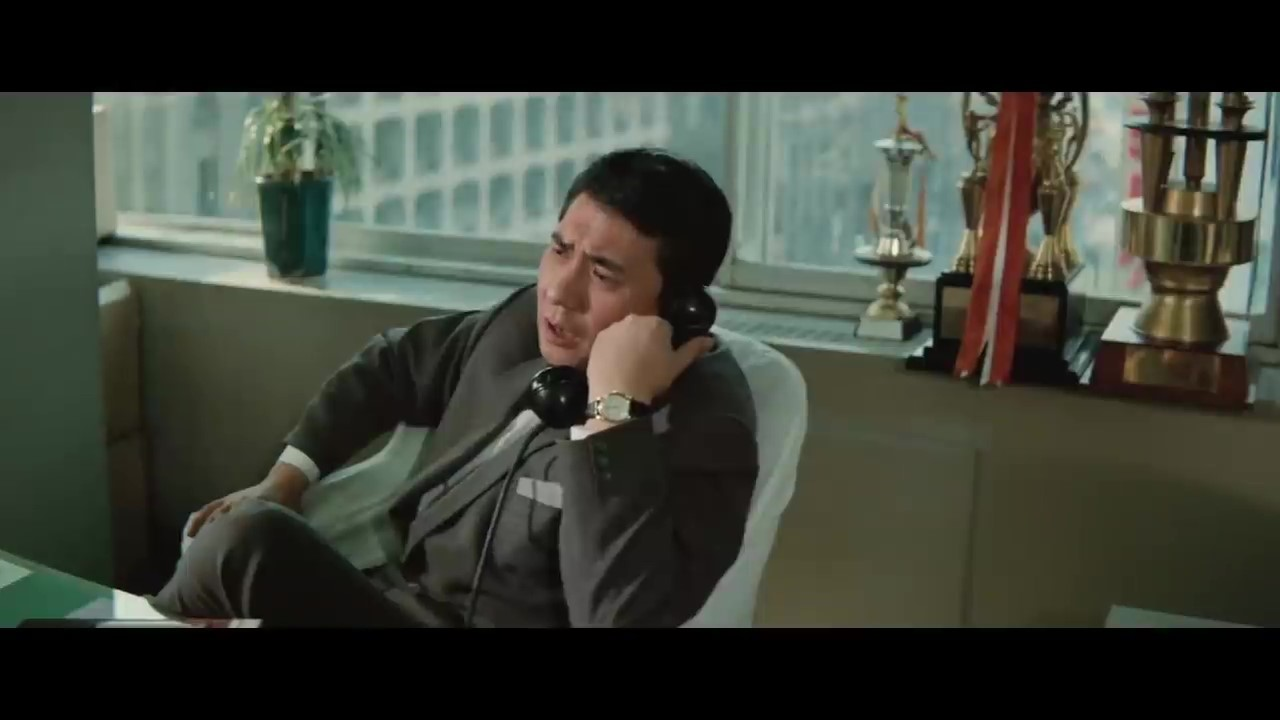
- in Nihon Kyokakuden Series 8
- Born: October 31, 1929; Tokyo
- Died: August 4, 2004 (aged 74)

Fumio Watanabe (渡辺文雄, Watanabe Fumio) (October 31, 1929 – August 4, 2004) was a Japanese actor most known for his work with Japanese New Wave director Nagisa Oshima. He was born in Tokyo and graduated from the University of Tokyo before joining the Shōchiku studio in 1956.

== Selected filmography ==
- Seishun no oto (1954)
- Izumi (1956)
- Sora yukaba (1957) - Tetsuo Sakai
- Aijo no keifu (1957) - Tatsumi Furuse
- Aoi hana no nagare (1957) - Taisuke Kojô
- Black River (1957) - Nishida
- Yoku (1958) - Katsuhiko Mochida
- Equinox Flower (1958) - Ichiro Nagamura
- Me no kabe (1958)
- Kawaki (1958)
- Ari no machi no Maria (1958)
- Cruel Story of Youth (1960)
- The Sun's Burial (1960)
- Late Autumn (1960)
- Violence at Noon (1966)
- Tales of the Ninja (Band of Ninja) (1967)
- Ceremony of Disbanding (1967)
- Shogun's Joys of Torture (1968)
- Death by Hanging (1968)
- Three Resurrected Drunkards (1968)
- Boy (1969)
- Bloodstained Clan Honor (1970)
- The Ceremony (1971)
- Female Convict 701: Scorpion (1972)
- Lone Wolf and Cub: Sword of Vengeance (子連れ狼 子を貸し腕貸しつかまつる Kozure Ōkami: Kowokashi udekashi tsukamatsuru) (1972)
- Female Convict Scorpion: Jailhouse 41 (1973)
- Never Give Up (1978)
- Tokyo Blackout (1987)

== Television ==
- Taikōki (1965), Takeda Katsuyori
- Daitsuiseki (1978)
- The Yagyu Conspiracy (1978)

== Personal life ==
He was a friend of C. W. Nicol.
