= Gohatto =

1999 Japanese film by Nagisa Ōshima

- Film poster
- Gohatto (御法度)
- Directed by: Nagisa Ōshima
- Written by: Nagisa Ōshima
- Based on: Shinsengumi Keppūroku by Ryōtarō Shiba
- Produced by: Masayuki Motomochi
- Starring: Ryuhei Matsuda; Takeshi Kitano; Tadanobu Asano
- Cinematography: Toyomichi Kurita
- Edited by: Tomoyo Ōshima
- Music by: Ryuichi Sakamoto
- Distributed by: Shochiku (Japan); New Yorker Films (USA)
- Release date: December 18, 1999 (Japan)
- Running time: 100 minutes
- Country: Japan
- Language: Japanese

Gohatto (Japanese: 御法度), also known as Taboo, is a 1999 Japanese film directed by Nagisa Ōshima. Its subject is homosexuality in the Shinsengumi during the bakumatsu period, the end of the samurai era in the mid-19th century. The production was Õshima's final film before his death, thirteen years after Gohatto's premiere.

== Plot ==
At the start of the movie, the young and handsome Kanō Sōzaburō (Ryuhei Matsuda) is admitted to the Shinsengumi, an elite samurai group led by Kondō Isami (Yoichi Sai) that seeks to defend the Tokugawa shogunate against reformist forces. He is a very skilled swordsman, but it is his appearance that makes many of the others in the (strictly male) group, both students and superiors, attracted to him, creating tension within the group of people vying for Kanō's affections.

== Cast ==
- Takeshi Kitano as Vice-Commander Hijikata Toshizō
- Ryuhei Matsuda as Kanō Sōzaburō
- Shinji Takeda as Captain Okita Sōji
- Tadanobu Asano as Hyōzō Tashiro
- Yoichi Sai as Commander Kondō Isami
- Koji Matoba as Sugano Heibei
- Masa Tomiizu as Inspector Yamazaki Susumu
- Masato Ibu as Military Advisor Itō Koshitarō
- Jirō Sakagami as Inoue Genzaburō
- Yoshiaki Fujiwara as Samurai
- Tomorowo Taguchi as Samurai Tojiro Yuzawa
- Kei Satō as Narrator (voice)

== Production ==
The Japanese title of the film, Gohatto, is an old-fashioned term that can be translated as "against the law". Nowadays, gohatto can be translated as "strictly forbidden" or "taboo" ("tabu").

During the filming of Taboo, actor Ryuhei Matsuda was sixteen years old.

It was Nagisa Ōshima's final directorial effort.

== Reception ==
Roger Ebert wrote that "Taboo is not an entirely successful film, but it isn't boring." Peter Bradshaw of The Guardian said that it was "a film which for some will be dismayingly impenetrable, but it is unmistakably the work of a master film-maker and a work of enormous strangeness and charm."

On the review aggregator website Rotten Tomatoes, 71% of 21 critics' reviews are positive.

The film was a financial success in Japan, grossing ¥1.01 billion and becoming one of the highest-grossing films of the year. The film was also given a limited theatrical release in North America where it grossed $114,425.

== Home video ==
From July 2020 through June 2021, the Criterion Channel streamed the film as part of the feature collection "Scores by Ryuichi Sakamoto". Criterion's description for the film was;

This mesmerizing, atmospheric samurai tale infuses the genre with a subversive undercurrent of homoerotic frisson. When the young, strikingly handsome Kano Sozaburo (Ryuhei Matsuda) joins an elite samurai unit, his presence unleashes tensions among his fellow swordsmen—including his superior Hijikata Toshizo (Takeshi Kitano)—as they find themselves competing for his affections. The final feature from iconoclastic auteur Nagisa Oshima is a daring, visually sumptuous exploration of the rigid social codes of nineteenth-century Japan.

== Accolades ==
It was nominated for the Palme d'Or at the 2000 Cannes Film Festival, losing out to Dancer in the Dark.

The film won four awards at the 2000 Blue Ribbon Awards: Best Director for Nagisa Ōshima, Best Film, Best New Actor for Ryuhei Matsuda, and Best Supporting Actor for Shinji Takeda.

Ryuhei Matsuda won the 2000 Japan Academy Prize for Newcomer of the Year; the film was nominated in nine other categories. Matsuda also won the Best New Actor category of the 2001 Kinema Junpo Awards, as well as the 2001 Yokohama Film Festival prize for Best New Talent.

Tadanobu Asano won the Best Supporting Actor category at the 2000 Hochi Film Awards.

== Notes ==
- Thompson, Nathaniel (2006) [2002]. DVD Delirium: The International Guide to Weird and Wonderful Films on DVD; Volume 1 Redux. Godalming, England: FAB Press. pp. 331–332. ISBN 1-903254-39-6.
