= Ōsugi =

Ōsugi, Osugi, Oosugi or Ohsugi (written: 大杉 lit. "big sugi") is a Japanese surname. Notable people with the surname include:

- Isamu Osugi, Japanese mixed martial artist
- Katsuo Osugi (大杉 勝男, 1945–1992), Japanese baseball player
- Kumiko Ōsugi (大杉 久美子, born 1951), Japanese singer
- Masato Osugi (大杉 誠人, born 1983), Japanese footballer
- Ren Osugi (大杉 漣, 1951–2018), Japanese actor
- Sakae Ōsugi (大杉 栄, 1885–1923), Japanese anarchist
- Tsutomu Oosugi (ツトム・オースギ, born 1985), Japanese professional wrestler

== See also ==
- Ōsugi Station, a railway station in Ōtoyo, Nagaoka District, Kōchi Prefecture, Japan
