= The Sun's Burial =

1960 Japanese film by Nagisa Ōshima

- Theatrical release poster
- Directed by: Nagisa Ōshima
- Screenplay by: Nagisa Ōshima, Ishido Toshiro
- Produced by: Tomio Ikeda
- Starring: Hono Kayoko; Isao Sasaki; Masahiko Tsugawa
- Cinematography: Takashi Kawamata
- Edited by: Keiichi Uraoka
- Music by: Riichiro Manabe
- Production company: Shochiku Ofuna
- Distributed by: Shochiku
- Release date: August 9, 1960 (Japan)
- Running time: 87 minutes
- Country: Japan
- Language: Japanese

The Sun's Burial (Japanese: 太陽の墓場, Hepburn: Taiyō no Hakaba) is a 1960 Japanese film directed by Nagisa Ōshima. The Sun's Burial is known for its elements of Japanese nuberu bagu. The Sun's Burial depicts people at the bottom of the social pyramid.

Isao Sasaki was selected for one of the lead roles and made his acting debut in the film.

== Cast ==
- Kayoko Hono as Hanako
- Isao Sasaki as Takeshi
- Masahiko Tsugawa as Shin
- Fumio Watanabe as Yosehei
- Kamatari Fujiwara as Batasuke
- Tanie Kitabayashi as Chika
- Jun Hamamura as Goro Murata
- Rokkō Toura as Masa
- Asao Koike as Iromegane
- Eitarō Ozawa as Doranya
- Junzaburō Ban as Yosematsu
- Kunie Tanaka as thief
- Ichirō Nagai as Yari
- Hōsei Komatsu as beggar
- Gen Shimizu as boss of the Ohama clan
- Kei Satō as Sakaguchi
- Bokuzen Hidari as Bataya
- Yūsuke Kawazu as Yasu
