= Dear Summer Sister =

1972 drama film

- Film poster
- Directed by: Nagisa Ōshima
- Screenplay by: Nagisa Ōshima; Tsutomu Tamura; Mamoru Sasaki
- Produced by: Kinshirō Kuzui; Eiko Oshima
- Starring: Hiromi Kurita; Hosei Komatsu; Akiko Koyama; Shōji Ishibashi; Kei Satō
- Cinematography: Yasuhiro Yoshioka
- Edited by: Keiichi Uraoka
- Music by: Tōru Takemitsu
- Production company: Sozosha
- Distributed by: Art Theatre Guild
- Release date: August 5, 1972 (Japan)
- Running time: 96 minutes
- Country: Japan
- Language: Japanese

Dear Summer Sister (Japanese: 夏の妹, Hepburn: Natsu no imōto) is a 1972 Japanese drama film co-written and directed by Nagisa Ōshima. It was entered into the 33rd edition of the Venice Film Festival.

== Cast ==
- Hiromi Kurita as Sunaoko Kikuchi
- Hosei Komatsu as Kosuke Kikuchi
- Akiko Koyama as Tsuru Ōmura
- Shōji Ishibashi as Tsuruo Ōmura
- Kei Satō as Shinkō Kuniyoshi
- Taiji Tonoyama as Takuzo Sakurada
- Rokkō Toura as Rintoku Teruya
- Lily as Momoko Kofujida
