= Akiko Koyama =

Japanese actress (born 1935)

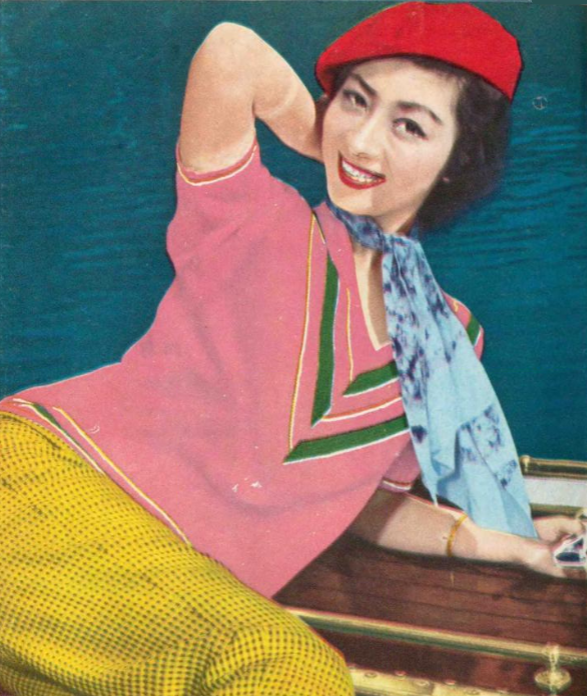
- In 1958
- Born: Akiko Usui; 27 January 1935 (age 91); Ichikawa, Chiba Prefecture, Japan
- Occupation: Actress
- Years active: 1955–present
- Spouse: Nagisa Ōshima (m. 1960; died 2013)
- Children: 2
- Awards: Mainichi Film Award; Japan Academy Film Prize

Akiko Koyama (小山 明子, Koyama Akiko; born 27 January 1935) is a Japanese stage and film actress who appeared in over 80 films, many directed by her husband Nagisa Ōshima.

== Biography ==
Koyama was born Akiko Usui in Ichikawa, Chiba Prefecture as the youngest of six children. She graduated from Kanagawa Prefectural Tsurumi High School in 1953 and entered a dressmaking school to study fashion design. After appearing on the cover of Katei Yomiuri magazine, she received an offer by the Shochiku film studios, where she gave her screen debut in 1955. In 1960, she married film director Nagisa Ōshima and left Shochiku with him, becoming a co-founder of the independent film company Sozosha which produced Ōshima's subsequent films and in which she regularly starred. In the 1980s, she switched from film to television work, while still appearing on stage. Koyama temporarily retired from acting after Ōshima's collapse from a cerebral hemorrhage in 1996 to nurse her husband. She and Ōshima, who died in 2013, had two sons. In recent years, she has been active as a lecturer and essayist on the subject of nursing care.

== Selected filmography ==
- Night and Fog in Japan (1960)
- The Catch (1961)
- Violence at Noon (1966)
- Death by Hanging (1968)
- Boy (1969)
- The Ceremony (1971)
- Wandering Ginza Butterfly (1972)
- Dear Summer Sister (1972)
- Karate Warriors (1976)
- In the Realm of the Senses (1976)
- Empire of Passion (1978)

== Awards ==
- 1969 Mainichi Film Award for Best Supporting Actress for Boy
- Special Award from the Chairman at the 2001 44th Japan Academy Film Prize ceremony
