= The Ceremony (1971 film) =

1971 Japanese film by Nagisa Ōshima

- Poster
- Directed by: Nagisa Ōshima
- Written by: Nagisa Ōshima; Mamoru Sasaki; Tsutomu Tamura
- Produced by: Kinshiro Kuzui; Takuji Yamaguchi
- Starring: Nobuko Otowa; Kenzo Kawarasaki; Atsuko Kaku
- Cinematography: Toichiro Narushima
- Edited by: Keiichi Uraoka
- Music by: Tōru Takemitsu
- Production companies: Sososha; Art Theatre Guild
- Distributed by: Art Theatre Guild
- Release date: 5 June 1971 (Japan)
- Running time: 123 minutes
- Country: Japan
- Language: Japanese

The Ceremony (Japanese: 儀式, Hepburn: Gishiki) is a 1971 Japanese drama film directed by Nagisa Ōshima, starring Kenzo Kawarasaki and Atsuko Kaku. The film takes place in post-war Japan, following a family clan through their wedding and funeral ceremonies, and the lengths the elder generation goes to preserve their traditions in spite of the damage it causes to the younger.

== Plot ==
The film begins with Masuo Sakurada receiving a telegram from his cousin Terumichi announcing his own death. Masuo is traveling with his cousin Ritsuko to check out his cabin and see if the telegram is true. Masuo has a flashback to the ceremony on the first anniversary of his father's death, after he and his mother are repatriated to Japan from Huludao. Because his younger brother died before they returned from the former Manchukuo, Masuo is expected to live for two sons.

Throughout each of the ceremonies, the tangled family web is revealed, with numerous instances of incest that make the relationships between each of the family members somewhat unclear. The continued incest is not only expected amongst the family. Masuo himself is interested in Setsuko, and later Ritsuko, and finds himself in competition with Terumichi for them.

Masuo finds himself sacrificing much of his freedom for the family. He has a talent for baseball, but gives it up when his mother dies and he is not present. He burns all of his baseball possessions except his glove. His sacrifice reaches its climax when he goes through a marriage ceremony to an absentee bride at his grandfather's insistence. He finally releases his frustration and hatred for his grandfather afterward. His grandfather dies years later, and at his memorial service Masuo is asked by his uncles to marry as quickly as possible to have another heir to the family lineage.

Masuo and Ritsuko finally arrive at Terumichi's cabin in the film's final segment, to discover that the telegram informing them of Terumichi's death is true. Ritsuko feels an obligation to commit suicide next to Terumichi, because he had been her lover. Masuo leaves the scene, and outside has a flashback to a childhood memory of playing baseball with his cousins and Setsuko, who have all died.

== Cast ==
- Nobuko Otowa as Sakurada Shizu
- Kenzō Kawarasaki as Masuo
- Kei Satō as Kazuomi, Grandfather
- Atsuko Kaku as Ritsuko
- Atsuo Nakamura as Terumichi
- Akiko Koyama as Setsuko
- Fumio Watanabe as Susumu
- Kiyoshi Tsuchiya as Tadashi
- Hosei Komatsu as Sakurada Isamu
- Rokkō Toura as Sakurada Mamoru
- Eitarō Ozawa as Tachibana Takeyo

== Production ==
=== Themes and interpretations ===
The Ceremony, like many other Ōshima films, is often seen as a social critique of Japanese society. One of the most important themes in the film is that of the clan's attempt to look prosperous on the outside, while it is secretly falling apart from within. In his article on Nagisa Ōshima at Senses of Cinema, Nelson Kim makes the case that this is showing how Japan in and of itself is "trapped between past and present", with an older generation stuck in their ways and a younger generation afraid to speak up. Any attempt at changing of the social order is quelled. This is seen best with the character of Tadashi, a far-right nationalist sympathizer who coincidentally dies after attempting to interrupt Masuo's wedding ceremony.

The film also shows the lengths that the Sakurada clan goes to preserve traditions, and how they negatively affect the younger generations. This is best seen in Masuo's wedding scene, in which his bride does not appear. Rather than canceling the wedding, Kazuomi insists that the ceremony go through as planned, with Masuo facing the embarrassment of having to marry a nonexistent bride.

The incest committed within the family is also a recurring critique of Japanese society. The clan's obsession with inbreeding to keep the family line pure is a reflection of the conformity, xenophobia, and racism that pervade Japanese society. Xenophobia is also satirized again at Masuo's wedding ceremony, when a relative of the absent bride is giving a speech on how this nonexistent girl is a "perfect and pure Japanese girl" who has been untainted by foreign influence.

A recurring scene in the film involves Masuo putting his ear to the ground. The first time the scene is shown, he explains that he is listening for his brother, who was buried alive in northeast China. This is repeated the night before Setsuko's death, and again at the end of the film. This gesture becomes a metaphor for the backward morality and that has crippled the humanity of the Sakurada clan.

=== Style and form ===
The Ceremony has a nonlinear narrative, jumping back and forth between the present, with Masuo and Ritsuko heading out to find Terumichi, and the past, all the weddings and funerals Masuo attended through his life. Masuo often delivers voice-over narration directed to his relatives about his regrets of the past and his feelings of how they affected his life. The musical score appears mostly during the present day sequences between Masuo and Ritsuko, or in sequences which would otherwise be silent. The ceremonies in the past usually do not have any musical accompaniment.

Ōshima and cinematographer Toichiru Narushima often make use of symmetrical framing and wide-angle lenses, and throughout each ceremony often track the camera in toward individuals who are talking. In wider shots within the ceremonies, the camera often focuses on one side of the clan's seating arrangement at the ceremony, framed so that everyone in the frame is facing the same direction, similar to the family meal scene at the end of Yasujirō Ozu's Tokyo Story.

The Ceremony makes use of many long takes. Some of the more private conversations during the ceremonies are played out throughout static long takes, with none of the characters moving around the screen. Wide-angle tracking shots are often used to help establish locations, as the film does not make usage of the 180 degree rule in its editing.
