= The Man Who Left His Will on Film =

1970 Japanese film by Nagisa Ōshima

- Theatrical release poster
- Directed by: Nagisa Ōshima
- Written by: Masato Hara; Mamoru Sasaki
- Story by: Nagisa Ôshima; Tsutomu Tamura
- Starring: Kazuo Goto; Emiko Iwasaki
- Cinematography: Toichiro Narushima
- Edited by: Keiichi Uraoka
- Music by: Tōru Takemitsu
- Release date: 27 June 1970 (Japan)
- Running time: 94 minutes
- Country: Japan
- Language: Japanese

The Man Who Left His Will on Film (Japanese: 東京戦争戦後秘話, Hepburn: Tokyo senso senyo hiwa; lit. Secret History of the Post-Tokyo-War Period)) is a 1970 Japanese film directed by Nagisa Ōshima and starring Kazuo Goto and Emiko Iwasaki. The film is also known as He Died After the War.

== Premise ==
The plot revolves around young activists in Tokyo in the wake of the 1968 student protests. While being chased by the police, one of them, a filmmaker, dies.

== Cast ==
- Kazuo Goto as Shoichi Motoki
- Emiko Iwasaki as Yasuko
- Kazuo Hashimoto as Takagi
- Sukio Fukuoka as Tanizawa
- Kenichi Fukuda as Matsumura
- Hiroshi Isogai as Sakamoto
- Kazuya Horikoshi as Endo
- Tomoyo Oshima as Akiko

== Analysis and reception ==
The Man Who Left His Will on Film is considered one of Oshima’s best achievements It has been compared to Fellini's 8½ for its complex point of view

The film is also remembered for its soundtrack by Tōru Takemitsu.
