= A Town of Love and Hope =

1959 Japanese film by Nagisa Oshima

- Theatrical release poster

Japanese name
- Kanji: 愛と希望の街
- Directed by: Nagisa Ōshima
- Written by: Nagisa Ōshima
- Produced by: Tomio Ikeda
- Starring: Hiroshi Fujikawa; Yuki Tominaga; Kakuko Chino; Yūko Mochizuki
- Cinematography: Hiroshi Kusuda
- Edited by: Yoshi Sugihara
- Music by: Riichirō Manabe
- Production company: Shochiku
- Distributed by: Shochiku
- Release date: 17 November 1959 (Japan)
- Running time: 62 minutes
- Country: Japan
- Language: Japanese

A Town of Love and Hope (愛と希望の街, Ai to kibō no machi), also known as Street of Love and Hope, is a 1959 Japanese drama film written and directed by Nagisa Ōshima. It was Ōshima's feature film debut.

== Plot ==
Masao lives with his mother, who works as a shoe polisher, and his sister in a poverty-stricken era of Tokyo. He earns extra money for the family by repeatedly selling his sister's pigeons to passersby in the city, knowing the pigeons will escape their new owners and return home after a few days. The latest buyer, upper-class girl Kyōko, unites with Masao's teacher Miss Akiyama in an act of sympathy to help Masao get a job in the company of Kyōko's father Kuhara. Kuhara first declines, but Kyōko's brother Yuji, who has developed an interest in Miss Akiyama, tries to talk him into giving Masao a chance. Yet, when Kyōko and Miss Akiyama find out that Masao's fraud was not a single but a repeated one, both turn away from him in disappointment. Breaking all ties in a final vengeful act, Kyōko once again purchases a pigeon from Masao and has her brother shoot it with his rifle.

== Cast ==
- Hiroshi Fujikawa as Masao
- Yuki Tominaga as Kyōko
- Kakuko Chino as Miss Akiyama, Masao's teacher
- Yūko Mochizuki as Kuniko, Masao's mother
- Fumio Watanabe as Yuji, Kyōko's brother
- Fujio Suga as Kuhara, Kyōko's father
- Michiko Ito as Yasue, Masao's sister
- Noboru Sakashita as Taizō
- Toyoko Uryū as Isako

== Production ==
Due to the "new wave policy" of Shochiku studio's head Shirō Kido, designed to promote fresh and free films, Ōshima was given the opportunity to write and direct his first feature film with the production title The Boy Who Sold His Pigeon. Kido, unsatisfied with the result and calling it a "tendency picture", only gave it limited distribution under the title A Town of Love and Hope. Still, reviews for the film were positive. More recent reviewers have pointed out the difference of A Town of Love and Hope both to other Japanese filmmakers of its era and Italian neorealism lying in its refusal to inject humanism or humanist sentiment into its portrayal of class opposition.

== Legacy ==
A Town of Love and Hope was presented at retrospectives on Ōshima at the Berkeley Art Museum and Pacific Film Archive in 2009 and at the Cinémathèque Française in 2015.
