= Three Resurrected Drunkards =

1968 Japanese film by Nagisa Ōshima

- Theatrical release poster
- Directed by: Nagisa Ōshima
- Written by: Masao Adachi; Mamoru Sasaki; Tsutomu Tamura; Nagisa Ōshima
- Based on: "Kaette kita yopparai" by The Folk Crusaders
- Produced by: Masayuki Nakajima
- Starring: Kazuhiko Katō; Osamu Kitayama; Norihiko Hashida; Kei Satō; Cha Dae-Sun; Fumio Watanabe; Mako Midori; Masao Adachi
- Cinematography: Yasuhiro Yoshioka
- Edited by: Keiichi Uraoka
- Music by: Hikaru Hayashi
- Production company: Sozosha
- Release date: March 30, 1968 (Japan)
- Running time: 80 minutes
- Country: Japan
- Language: Japanese

Three Resurrected Drunkards (Japanese: 帰って来たヨッパライ, Hepburn: Kaette kita yopparai) is a Japanese film directed by Nagisa Ōshima. It was based on the hit song "Kaette kita yopparai" by The Folk Crusaders, a folk and pop music group that also appeared in the film. It was released on March 30, 1968, in Japan.

== Plot ==
Three young men go to the beach. Someone steals their clothes while they swim, and replaces them with ones that then leave the three mistaken for illegal aliens. In a commentary on the way Korean immigrants are treated in Japan, the three must then flee from the authorities, who are presented in a ridiculing light.

== Cast ==
Cast:

- Kazuhiko Katō
- Osamu Kitayama
- Norihiko Hashida
- Kei Satō
- Cha Dae-Sun
- Fumio Watanabe
- Mako Midori
- Masao Adachi - Policeman

== Home media ==
A digitally restored version of the film was released on DVD by The Criterion Collection as part of their Eclipse Series.
