= Cruel Story of Youth =

1960 film

- Theatrical release poster
- Directed by: Nagisa Ōshima
- Written by: Nagisa Ōshima
- Starring: Yūsuke Kawazu; Miyuki Kuwano
- Cinematography: Takashi Kawamata
- Edited by: Keiichi Uraoka
- Music by: Riichiro Manabe
- Production company: Shochiku
- Release date: June 3, 1960 (Japan)
- Running time: 96 minutes
- Country: Japan
- Language: Japanese

Cruel Story of Youth (Japanese: 青春残酷物語, Hepburn: Seishun Zankoku Monogatari) is a 1960 Japanese film directed by Nagisa Ōshima, starring Yusuke Kawazu and Miyuki Kuwano as teenage delinquents and lovers. It is Ōshima's second feature film and is known for its elements of Japanese nuberu bagu. The film won the 1960 Blue Ribbon Awards for Best Newcomer for Ōshima.

== Plot ==
After Makoto Shinjo hitchhikes a ride, the driver tries to molest her, but is stopped by Kiyoshi Fuji. He takes her on a date, first to watch the Anpo Protests against the US-Japan Security Treaty, and then later to ride a motorboat on a river, where he rapes her. One day, after trying to wait for him at a bar he frequents, she is targeted by gangsters who prostitute women, but Kiyoshi fights them and they leave them alone in exchange for a payment. Afterward, he rapes her again, and Makoto confronts him, telling him she loves him and doesn't want their relationship to continue this way. At length, the two fall in love and Makoto spends more time with him, causing her to be rebuked by her older sister Yuki, resulting in her deciding to live with him. To make money, the two continue their criminal streak, with Makoto seducing male car drivers; when they come on to her, Kiyoshi intervenes and extorts them. In one case, a middle-aged, wealthy business-owner named Horio picks her up, but makes her feel happy, so she doesn't target him.

When Makoto finds out that she is pregnant, Kiyoshi tells her to get an abortion, but when he tries to get her to exploit a driver again, she refuses. Horio picks her up, and when she calls Kiyoshi to ask whether she can stay the night, the line is busy. Kiyoshi asks an older lover he is seeing for a loan and when he gives the money to Makoto, she tells him she slept with Horio. In response he finds Horio and takes money from him, telling him that he was just another target of Makoto's. After the abortion, performed illegally at the clinic of Yuki's former lover Akimoto, the couple is arrested for extortion. After they confess, and with the help of Kiyoshi's older lover, the two are released and Akimoto is arrested.

Kiyoshi breaks up with Makoto so they won't hurt each other anymore. The gangsters find Kiyoshi because the motorbike he borrowed from them for the extortions was stolen, resulting in two of them being arrested. They ask him to give them Makoto, but Kiyoshi refuses and is killed. At the same time Makoto is given a ride by a passerby, and when he refuses to let her out, she jumps out of the car to her death.

== Cast ==
- Yūsuke Kawazu as Kiyoshi Fujii
- Miyuki Kuwano as Makoto Shinjo
- Yoshiko Kuga as Makoto's elder sister Yuki
- Fumio Watanabe as Akimoto
- Shinji Tanaka as Yoshimi Ito, student
- Shinjiro Matsuzaki as Terada
- Toshiko Kobayashi as Teruko Shimonishi

== Production ==
Ōshima, who was only 28 at the time, made extensive use of hand-held cameras and location shooting, and the results drew comparisons to the French nouvelle vague filmmakers emerging at around the same time; the film became one of the primary films in the Nūberu bāgu.

The use of adolescent criminals as protagonists generated controversy at the time, though the film was also a commercial success, which helped to pave the way for the emergence of a young and adventurous generation of new Japanese filmmakers: in short order, Shohei Imamura, Masahiro Shinoda, Yasuzo Masumura, Susumu Hani, Hiroshi Teshigahara and others began to attract international attention. In this film, Ōshima was already beginning to explore the themes he would soon become celebrated for: a focus on youth and on 'outsiders', and critical deconstructions of more stereotypical imagery in Japanese cinema.

== Reception ==
Vincent Canby of The New York Times complimented the colors and cinematography of the film, but was confused by its unexplained political and social references and felt the story was told too distantly, making it dim. Mary Evans of The Japan Times compared the film to a sociological study which, while mostly succeeding, failed when it moralized. She also found faults in the originality of the story, the violence of the ending, and the portrayal of the gangsters and Makoto, but called the film strong and praised Ōshima's "great feeling for his medium." James Hoberman of The Village Voice described the film as a "candy-colored extravaganza [that] is directed with considerable brio and filled with bold metaphors", but felt that certain aspects were dated such as "powerless men preying upon even weaker women" and its "absence of cynicism and even careerism."

The film won the 1960 Blue Ribbon Awards for Best Newcomer for Ōshima.
