= Violence at Noon =

1966 Japanese film by Nagisa Ōshima

- Theatrical release poster

Japanese name
- Kanji: 白昼の通り魔
- Directed by: Nagisa Ōshima
- Written by: Tsutomu Tamura; Taijun Takeda (story)
- Produced by: Masayuki Nakajima
- Starring: Kei Satō; Saeda Kawaguchi; Akiko Koyama; Rokkō Toura; Fumio Watanabe
- Cinematography: Akira Takada
- Edited by: Keiichi Uraoka
- Music by: Hayashi Hikaru
- Distributed by: Shochiku
- Release date: 15 July 1966 (Japan)
- Running time: 99 minutes
- Country: Japan
- Language: Japanese

Violence at Noon (白昼の通り魔, Hakuchū no tōrima), also titled Violence at High Noon, is a 1966 Japanese crime drama film directed by Nagisa Ōshima.

== Plot ==
After housemaid Shino is attacked and tied up and her employer raped and murdered, it turns out that Shino and the intruder, serial killer Eisuke, are from the same rural village. Shino pretends not to be sure about Eisuke's identity and, with the police on her track, travels to Osaka to meet Mrs. Kura, Eisuke's wife. In a series of flashbacks it is revealed that Shino, the sole survivor of a shinjū with her lover Genji, was raped afterwards by Eisuke while being unconscious. Village teacher Kura, Genji's former lover, married Eisuke despite her knowledge of his deed, and kept his identity a secret although she knew of his crimes. Back in the present, Shino convinces Kura to turn Eisuke over to the police. After his death sentence, Kura talks Shino into committing suicide with her, which she regards as the last logical act. Kura dies, and Shino is again the sole survivor of a double suicide attempt.

== Cast ==
- Kei Satō as Eisuke Oyamada
- Saeda Kawaguchi as Shino Shinozaki
- Akiko Koyama as Matsuko Kura
- Rokkō Toura as Genji Hyuga
- Fumio Watanabe as Detective Haraguchi
- Taiji Tonoyama as Principal

== Production ==
Consisting of over 2,000 single shots, Violence at Noon was once considered the most highly edited work in Japanese film history.

== Legacy ==
Violence at Noon was presented at retrospectives on Ōshima at the Museum of Modern Art, the Berkeley Art Museum and Pacific Film Archive, the Harvard Film Archive and the Toronto International Film Festival.
