= Night and Fog in Japan =

1960 Japanese film

- Directed by: Nagisa Ōshima
- Written by: Nagisa Ōshima; Toshirō Ishido
- Produced by: Tomio Ikeda
- Starring: Fumio Watanabe; Miyuki Kuwano; Takao Yoshizawa
- Cinematography: Takashi Kawamata
- Edited by: Keiichi Uraoka
- Music by: Riichiro Manabe
- Production company: Shochiku
- Distributed by: Shochiku
- Release date: 9 October 1960 (Japan)
- Running time: 107 minutes
- Country: Japan
- Language: Japanese

Night and Fog in Japan (日本の夜と霧, Nihon no Yoru to Kiri) is a 1960 Japanese drama film directed by Nagisa Ōshima. It deals with the contemporaneous Zengakuren opposition but also evokes the 1960 protests against the Anpo treaty; this political content is related to the particular approach of memory and interpersonal dynamics of social movements in the film.

The film is often further interpreted as the weakness of the Japanese left throughout the late 1940s and 1950s, particularly as a result of Stalinist influence, in which many ideas within the film that could represent the Comintern are heavily critiqued.

== Plot ==
In 1960, in the aftermath of the Anpo Protests against the US-Japan Security Treaty, uninvited guests interrupt the wedding ceremony between Nozawa, a journalist and former student radical of the 1950s, and Reiko, a current activist. They accuse the couple and assembled guests of forgetting their political commitments, invoking a tortured exploration of unresolved conflicts of a decade ago, when they were swept up in the student demonstrations. In flashbacks, personal and political wounds are reopened, focused on Nozawa's subjective experiences in both 1950 and 1960. Two characters, one dead by suicide, the other now a Stalinist politician, are the subject of greatest scrutiny. The memory of Takao, a young student who committed suicide after letting a "spy" free, is reconstructed as a criticism of the authoritarian leadership of the Zengakuren of 1950. Nakayawa, former student leader now Communist functionary, is castigated for his role in the tragedy and his possession of Misako, a much desired female student. Other forgotten comrades from 1950 and fresh from the bloody demonstrations of 1960 are invoked as political and personal challenges. In the end, night and fog envelops the guests as they stand immobile to the stilted speech of the unchanged Nakayawa: memory has been invoked, but it is unclear whether or not anything has changed.

== Cast ==
- Fumio Watanabe as Nozawa
- Masahiko Tsugawa as Ōta
- Miyuki Kuwano as Harada
- Hiroshi Akutagawa as Utagawa
- Noriko Ujiie as Utagawa's wife
- Kei Satō
- Rokkō Toura

== Production ==
For Night and Fog in Japan Ōshima received the funding and creative latitude as part of Shochiku's strategy of promoting films by several young directors which the studio marketed as the "Shochiku New Wave" (Shochiku Nuberu bagu).

== Release ==
Three days after it was released, the film was abruptly pulled by the studio in the wake of Japanese Socialist Party politician Inejiro Asanuma's assassination by far right student Otoya Yamaguchi. Ōshima protested what he saw as the politically motivated censorship of his bold film. In this response, he expressed faith in the potential of the audience to receive controversial political films, taking issue with the political repression of the film industry and critics. Ōshima's claimed that "my film is the weapon of the people's struggle," and, of the resistance to censorship: "that is the voice of the people demanding that the future of the Japanese film be directly tied to their own future."

== Background ==
In 1948 the Zengakuren was formed, mobilizing Japanese students against the first Anpo treaty with the United States. This is the time period detailed in flashbacks, during which Nozawa, Nakayama, Misako, Takao, and Takumi were active. At the time, the Zengakuren was dominated by the Japanese Communist Party, represented in the film by the dogmatic leadership of Nakayama. Although resistance to the treaty failed in 1950, a new generation of student activists in 1960 challenged its renewal with massive street demonstrations, which once again ended in failure. This is Reiko's generation, and the demonstrations covered by Nozawa. The Zengakuren of this period tried to assert its independence from the Japanese Communist Party, and subsequently fractured into several organizations that continued to retain the name. Night and Fog in Japan, with extensive political dialogue peppered with Marxist rhetoric, tries to make sense of political defeat and the reconciliation of these two generations. Although the marriage of Nozawa and Reiko seems to suggest the possibility of reconciliation, Nakayama looms large as the imposition of forced forgetting and the denial of reflection in favor of Party orthodoxy. Director Nagisa Ōshima clearly was critical of Stalinism and the failure of political reflection. This pessimistic assessment pervades the film (Ōshima had been involved in, and sympathized with, student movements himself), especially in the portrayal of personal motivations in political movements.

== Analysis ==
Commentators on Night and Fog in Japan have noted its formal innovation, especially its theatricality. Maureen Turim describes, in addition to innovative long take and shot sequences reminiscent of Kenji Mizoguchi, a new filmic theatricality. Spatial restriction, lighting, color, and gesture figure in it, but most importantly it is the way spoken lines and confrontations are ordered by camera movement and shot, so that "the cinema becomes a device for redefining theatrical language." Dana Polan sees the film as part of a broader element of Ōshima's cinema in which political meaning emerges "as process between screen and spectator." For example, in the ten-minute opening shot, camera movement and the symmetry of the wedding ceremony suggests a political stability threatened by the fog outside and the tracking shot that introduces the uninvited guests- destabilizing both composition and ideological certainty. More than just narratively showing political process, Ōshima's filmic technique demands the spectator reflect on the political and personal implications of form and character.

Film historian Geoffrey Nowell-Smith described Night and Fog in Japan as the most aesthetically original film in any of the world's cinematic New Waves up to the year 1960, with the possible exceptions of Hiroshima mon amour, Breathless, or Shadows.

== See also ==
- Night and Fog, 1956 French short documentary after which Oshima’'s film was titled
