= Nagisa Ōshima =

Japanese filmmaker (1932–2013)

- 大島 渚
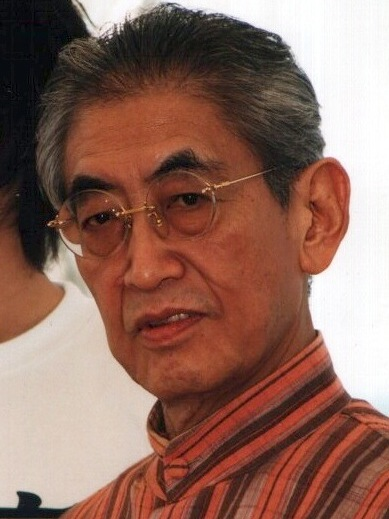
- Ōshima in 2000
- Born: March 31, 1932; Tamano, Okayama, Empire of Japan
- Died: January 15, 2013 (aged 80); Fujisawa, Kanagawa, Japan
- Education: Kyoto University
- Occupations: Film director; writer; activist
- Years active: 1953-1999
- Notable work: Cruel Story of Youth (1960); Night and Fog in Japan (1960); Death by Hanging (1968); The Ceremony (1971); In the Realm of the Senses (1976); Merry Christmas, Mr. Lawrence (1983)
- Movement: Japanese New Wave
- Spouse: Akiko Koyama (m. 1960)
- Children: 2

Nagisa Ōshima (大島 渚, Ōshima Nagisa; March 31, 1932 – January 15, 2013) was a Japanese film director, writer, and left-wing activist who is best known for his fiction films, of which he directed 23 features in a career spanning from 1959 to 1999. He is regarded as one of the greatest Japanese directors of all time, and as one of the most important figures of the Japanese New Wave (Nūberu bāgu), alongside Shōhei Imamura. His film style was bold, innovative and provocative. Common themes in his work include youthful rebellion, class and racial discrimination and taboo sexuality.

His first major film was his second feature, Cruel Story of Youth (1960), one of the first Japanese New Wave films, a youth-oriented film with an earnest portrayal of the sexual lives and criminal activities of its young protagonists. He came to greater international renown after Death By Hanging (1968), a film on the theme of capital punishment and anti-Korean sentiment, was shown at the Cannes Film Festival in 1968. His most controversial film is In the Realm of the Senses (1976), a sexually explicit film set in 1930s Japan.

== Profile ==
=== Early life ===
Nagisa Ōshima was born into a family of aristocratic samurai roots. His father was a government official who had a large library. Ōshima spent very little time with his father, who died when he was six, which left a deep mark on him. Ōshima would point to this as the most important event of his childhood in his 1992 essay My Father's Non-existence: A Determining Factor in My Existence. After graduating from Kyoto University in 1954, where he studied political history, Ōshima was hired by film production company Shochiku Ltd. and quickly progressed to directing his own movies, making his debut feature A Town of Love and Hope in 1959.

=== During the 1960s ===
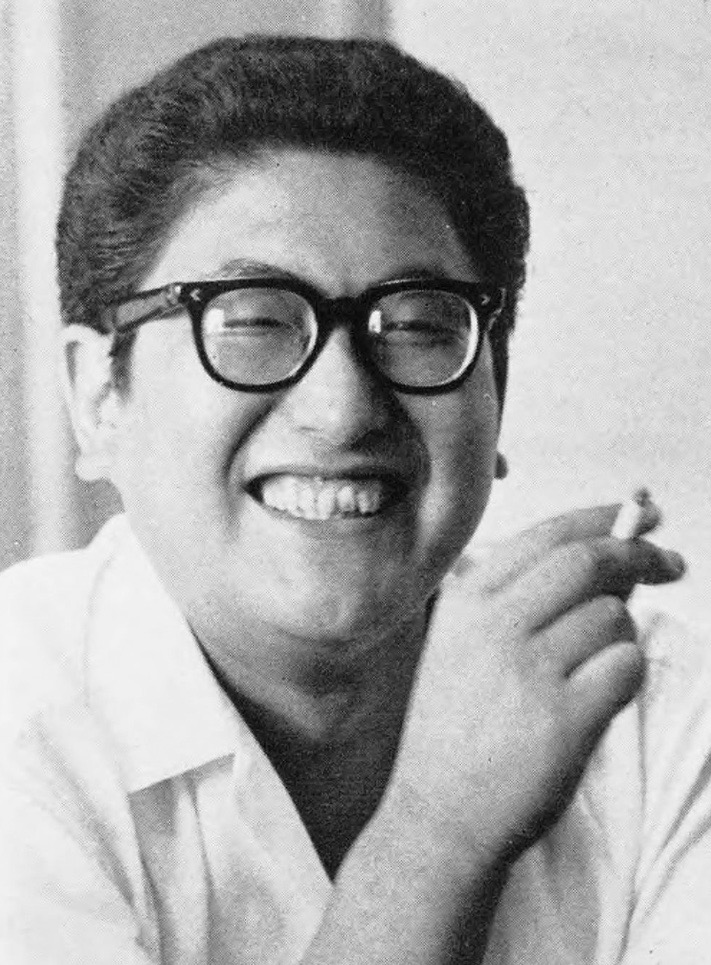
Oshima in 1962

Ōshima's cinematic career and influence developed very swiftly, and such films as Cruel Story of Youth, The Sun's Burial and Night and Fog in Japan followed in 1960. The last of these 1960 films explored Ōshima's disillusionment with the traditional political left, and his frustrations with the right, and Shochiku withdrew the film from circulation after less than a week, claiming that, following the recent assassination of the Socialist Party leader Inejiro Asanuma by the ultranationalist Otoya Yamaguchi, there was a risk of "unrest". Ōshima left the studio in response, and launched his own independent production company. Despite the controversy, Night and Fog in Japan placed tenth in that year's Kinema Jumpo's best-films poll of Japanese critics, and it has subsequently amassed considerable acclaim abroad.

In 1961 Ōshima directed The Catch, based on a novella by Kenzaburō Ōe about the relationship between a wartime Japanese village and a captured African American serviceman. The Catch has not traditionally been viewed as one of Ōshima’s major works, though it did notably introduce a thematic exploration of bigotry and xenophobia, themes which would be explored in greater depth in the later documentary Diary of Yunbogi, and feature films Death by Hanging and Three Resurrected Drunkards. He embarked upon a period of work in television, producing a series of documentaries; notably among them 1965's Diary Of Yunbogi. Based upon an examination of the lives of street children in Seoul, it was made by Ōshima after a trip to South Korea.

Ōshima directed three features in 1968. The first of these, Death by Hanging (1968), presented the story of the failed execution of a young Korean for rape and murder, and was loosely based upon an actual crime and execution which had taken place in 1958. The film utilizes non-realistic "distancing" techniques after the fashion of Bertold Brecht or Jean-Luc Godard to examine Japan's record of racial discrimination against its Korean minority, incorporating elements of farce and political satire, and a number of visual techniques associated with the cinematic new wave in a densely layered narrative. It was placed third in Kinema Jumpo's 1968 poll, and has also garnered significant attention globally. Death By Hanging inaugurated a string of films (continuing through 1976's In the Realm of the Senses) that clarified a number of Ōshima's key themes, most notably a need to question social constraints, and to similarly deconstruct received political doctrines.

Months later, Diary of a Shinjuku Thief unites a number of Ōshima's thematic concerns within a dense, collage-style presentation. Featuring a title which alludes to Jean Genet's The Thief's Journal, the film explores the links between sexual and political radicalism, specifically examining the day-to-day life of a would-be radical whose sexual desires take the form of kleptomania. The fragmented narrative is interrupted by commentators, including Kara Jūrō's underground performance troupe, starring Kara Jūrō, his then wife Ri Reisen, and Maro Akaji (who would go on to lead the butoh troupe Dairakudakan). Yokoo Tadanori, an artist who created many of the iconic theatre posters during the 1960s and '70s, plays the thief, who gets a bit part in Kara's performance. The film also features a psychoanalyst, the president of Kinokuniya Bookstore in Shinjuku, and an impromptu symposium featuring actors from previous Ōshima films (along with Ōshima himself), all dissecting varied aspects of shifting sexual politics, as embodied by various characters within the film.

Boy (1969), based on another real-life case, was the story of a family who use their child to make money by deliberately getting involved in road accidents and making the drivers pay compensation.

=== 1970s career ===
The Ceremony (1971) is a satirical film on traditional Japanese attitudes, famously expressed in a scene where a marriage ceremony has to go ahead even though the bride is not present.

In 1976, Ōshima made In the Realm of the Senses, a film based on a true story of fatal sexual obsession in 1930s Japan. Ōshima, a critic of censorship and his contemporary Akira Kurosawa's humanism, was determined that the film should feature unsimulated sex and thus the undeveloped film had to be transported to France to be processed. An uncensored version of the movie is still unavailable in Japan. A book with stills and script notes from the film was published by San’ichishobo, and in 1976 the Japanese government brought obscenity charges against Ōshima and San’ichishobo. Ōshima testified in the trial and said. "Nothing that is expressed is obscene. What is obscene is what is hidden." Ōshima and the publisher were found not guilty in 1979; the government appealed and the Tokyo High Court upheld the verdict in 1982.

In his 1978 companion film to In the Realm of the Senses, Empire of Passion, Ōshima took a more restrained approach to depicting the sexual passions of the two lovers driven to murder, and the film won the 1978 Cannes Film Festival award for best director.

=== 1980s onwards ===
In 1983 Ōshima had a critical success with Merry Christmas, Mr. Lawrence, a film partly in English and set in a wartime Japanese prison camp, and featuring rock star David Bowie and musician Ryuichi Sakamoto, alongside Takeshi Kitano. The movie is sometimes viewed as a minor classic but never found a mainstream audience. Max mon amour (1986), written with Luis Buñuel's frequent collaborator Jean-Claude Carrière, was a comedy about a diplomat's wife (Charlotte Rampling) whose love affair with a chimpanzee is quietly incorporated into an eminently civilised ménage à trois.

For much of the 1980s and 1990s, he served as president of the Directors Guild of Japan. He won the inaugural Directors Guild of Japan New Directors Award in 1960.

A collection of Ōshima's essays and articles was published in English in 1993 as Cinema, Censorship and the State. In 1995 he wrote and directed the archival documentary '100 Years of Japanese Cinema' for the British Film Institute. A critical study by Maureen Turim appeared in 1998.

In 1996 Ōshima suffered a stroke, but he recovered enough to return to directing in 1999 with the samurai film Taboo (Gohatto), set during the bakumatsu era and starring Merry Christmas, Mr. Lawrence actor Takeshi Kitano. Ryuichi Sakamoto, who had both acted in and composed for Lawrence, provided the score.

He subsequently suffered more strokes, and Gohatto proved to be his final film. Ōshima had initially planned to create a biopic entitled Hollywood Zen based on the life of Issei actor Sessue Hayakawa. The script had been allegedly completed and set to film in Los Angeles, but due to constant delays, declining health, and Ōshima's eventual death in 2013 (see below), the project went unrealized.

Having a degree of fluency in English, in the 2000s, Ōshima worked as a translator. He translated four books by John Gray into Japanese, including Men Are from Mars, Women Are from Venus.

Ōshima died on January 15, 2013, of pneumonia. He was 80.

The 2013 edition of the San Sebastian Film Festival scheduled a retrospective of Ōshima films in September.

== Filmography ==
=== Feature Films ===
Year	English title	Japanese title	Romanized title	Director	Writer	Notes
1959	Donto ikōze	どんと行こうぜ	Donto ikōze	No	Yes	Co-written with Yoshitarō Nomura
1959	A Town of Love and Hope	愛と希望の街	Ai to Kibō no Machi	Yes	Yes	
1960	Cruel Story of Youth	青春残酷物語	Seishun Zankoku Monogatari	Yes	Yes	
1960	The Sun's Burial	太陽の墓場	Taiyō no Hakaba	Yes	Yes	Co-written with Toshirō Ishidō
1960	Night and Fog in Japan	日本の夜と霧	Nihon no Yoru to Kiri	Yes	Yes	Co-written with Toshirō Ishidō
1961	The Catch	飼育	Shiiku	Yes	No	
1962	The Rebel	天草四郎時貞	Amakusa Shirō Tokisada	Yes	Yes	Co-written with Toshirō Ishidō
1965	The Pleasures of the Flesh	悦楽	Etsuraku	Yes	Yes	
1966	Violence at Noon	白昼の通り魔	Hakuchū no tōrima	Yes	No	
1967	Tales of the Ninja (Band of Ninja)	忍者武芸帳	Ninja Bugei-Chō	Yes	Yes	Co-written with Mamoru Sasaki
1967	Sing a Song of Sex	日本春歌考	Nihon Shunka-Kō	Yes	Yes	Co-written with Mamoru Sasaki, Tsutomu Tamura, and Toshio Tajima
1967	Double Suicide: Japanese Summer	無理心中日本の夏	Muri Shinjū: Nihon no Natsu	Yes	Yes	Co-written with Mamoru Sasaki and Tamura Tsutomu
1968	Death by Hanging	絞死刑	Kōshikē	Yes	Yes	Co-written with Mamoru Sasaki, Michinori Fukao, and Tsutomu Tamura
1968	Three Resurrected Drunkards	帰って来たヨッパライ	Kaette Kita Yopparai	Yes	Yes	Co-written with Mamoru Sasaki, Masao Adachi, and Tsutomu Tamura
1969	Diary of a Shinjuku Thief	新宿泥棒日記	Shinjuku Dorobō Nikki	Yes	Yes	Co-written with Mamoru Sasaki, Masao Adachi, and Tsutomu Tamura
1969	Boy	少年	Shōnen	Yes	No	
1970	The Man Who Left His Will on Film	東京戰争戦後秘話	Tōkyō Sensō Sengo Hiwa	Yes	No	
1971	The Ceremony	儀式	Gishiki	Yes	Yes	Co-written with Mamoru Sasaki and Tsutomu Tamura
1972	Dear Summer Sister	夏の妹	Natsu no Imōto	Yes	Yes	Co-written with Mamoru Sasaki and Tsutomu Tamura
1976	In the Realm of the Senses	愛のコリーダ	Ai no Korīda	Yes	Yes	
1978	Empire of Passion	愛の亡霊	Ai no Bōrē	Yes	Yes	Co-written with Itoko Nakamura
1983	Merry Christmas, Mr. Lawrence	戦場のメリークリスマス	Senjō no Merī Kurisumasu	Yes	Yes	Co-written with Paul Mayersberg
1986	Max mon amour	マックス、モン・アムール	Makkusu, Mon Amūru	Yes	Yes	Co-written with Jean-Claude Carrière
1999	Taboo	御法度	Gohatto	Yes	Yes	

=== Short Films ===
Year	English title	Japanese title	Romanized title	Ref.
1959	Tomorrow's Sun	明日の太陽	Ashita no Taiyō	
1965	Yunbogi's Diary	ユンボギの日記	Yunbogi no Nikki	

=== Television ===
Year	English title	Romanized title
1962	Youth on the Ice	Kōri no Naka no Seishun
1963	Forgotten Soldiers	Wasurerareta Kōgun
1963	A Small Child's First Adventure	Chiisana Bōken Ryokō
1964	It's Me Here, Bellett	Watashi wa Beretto
1964	The Tomb of Youth	Seishun no Ishibumi
1964	A Rebel's Fortress	Hankotsu no Toride
1964	The Girl Under an Assumed Name	Gimei Shōjo
1964	Crossing the Pacific on the Chita Niseigo	Chita Niseigo Taiheiyō Ōdan
1964	A National Railway Worker	Aru Kokutetsu-Jōmuin
1964	Ode to an Old Teacher	Aogeba Tōtoshi
1964	Why I Love You	Aisurebakoso
1964	The Dawn of Asia	Ajia no Akebono
1965	The Trawler Incident	Gyosen Sonansu
1968	The Pacific War (The Greater East Asian War)	Daitōa Sensō
1969	Mao and the Cultural Revolution	Mō-Takutō to Bunka Daikakumē
1972	Giants	Kyojin-Gun
1972	Joi! Bangla	Joi! Bangla
1972	The Journey of the Blind Musicians	Goze: Mōmoku no Onna-Tabigēnin
1973	The Father of Bangladesh	Bengal no Chichi Laman
1975	The Battle of Tsushima	Ikiteiru Nihonkai-Kaisen
1976	The Isle of the Final Battle	Ikiteiru Gyokusai no Shima
1976	The Golden Land of Bengal	Ōgon no Daichi Bengal
1976	The Sunken Tomb	Ikiteiru Umi no Bohyō
1976	The Life of Mao	Denki Mō-Takutō
1977	Human Drama: 28 Years of Hiding in the Jungle	Yokoi Shōichi: Guamu-to 28 Nen no Nazo o Ou
1977	The Dead Remain Young	Shisha wa Itsumademo Wakai
1991	Kyōto, My Mother's Place	
1994	100 Years of Japanese Cinema	

== Bibliography ==
- Pasolini Renaissance, ISBN 978-4925095044

=== Translations ===
- "Ai ga Fukamaru Hon - "Honto no Yorokobi" o shiru tame ni" (translation of "Making Heart-to-Heart Love in Bed" by John Gray) ISBN 978-4837970170
- ベスト・パートナーになるために―男と女が知っておくべき「分かち愛」のルール 男は火星から、女は金星からやってきた (translation of "Men Are from Mars, Women Are from Venus" by John Gray) ISBN 978-4837971764

== Style ==
Nagisa Oshima was known for the protean nature of his work. From one film to the next, he would frequently shuffle between black-and-white and color, between academy ratio and widescreen, between long takes and fragmented cutting, and between formally composed images and a cinéma vérité style.

In multiple interviews, Oshima has named Luis Buñuel as a director he profoundly admires. The influence of Buñuel's work can be seen as early as in The Sun's Burial (1960), which was possibly inspired by Los Olvidados, and as late as in Max mon amour (1986), for which Oshima worked with Jean-Claude Carrière, a frequent collaborator of Buñuel's.

== Legacy ==
Film scholars who have focused on the work of Ōshima include Isolde Standish, a film theorist specializing in East Asia. She teaches courses on Ōshima at the School of Oriental and African Studies in London and wrote extensively on him as for example:

- Politics, Porn and Protest: Japanese Avant-Garde Cinema in the 1960s and 1970s. New York: Continuum Int. Publishing Group.
- 'Transgression and the Politics of Porn. Ōshima Nagisa's In the Realm of the Senses (1976)'. In: Phillips, A. and Stringer, J., (eds.), Japanese Cinema: Texts and Contexts. Abingdon: Routledge, pp 217-228).

== Awards ==
Year of award	Awarding organization	Name of award	Film title (if applicable)	Country of Origin
1961	Blue Ribbon Awards	Best Newcomer	Cruel Story of Youth; Night and Fog in Japan	Japan
1969	Kinema Junpo	Best Screenplay	Death by Hanging	Japan
1971	Mainichi Film Awards	Best Screenplay	The Ceremony	Japan
1972	Kinema Junpo	Best Director	The Ceremony	Japan
1972	Kinema Junpo	Best Film	The Ceremony	Japan
1972	Kinema Junpo	Best Screenplay	The Ceremony	Japan
1978	Cannes Film Festival	Best Director	Empire of Passion	France
1978	Mainichi Film Awards	Excellent Film	Empire of Passion	Japan
1983	Mainichi Film Awards	Best Film	Merry Christmas, Mr. Lawrence	Japan
1983	Mainichi Film Awards	Best Director	Merry Christmas, Mr. Lawrence	Japan
1983	Mainichi Film Awards	Best Screenplay	Merry Christmas, Mr. Lawrence	Japan
1984	Kinema Junpo	Readers' Choice Award for Best Film	Merry Christmas, Mr. Lawrence	Japan
2000	Blue Ribbon Awards	Best Director	Taboo	Japan
2000	Blue Ribbon Awards	Best Film	Taboo	Japan

== Notes ==
=== References ===
- Turim, Maureen Cheryn (1998). The Films of Oshima Nagisa: Images of a Japanese Iconoclast. Berkeley: University of California. ISBN 978-0520206663.
- Bock, Audie (1978). Japanese Film Directors. Kodansha. ISBN 0-87011-304-6.
- Oshima, Nagisa (1992). Cinema, Censorship And The State. Cambridge: MIT Press. ISBN 0-262-65039-8.
