= Art Theatre Guild filmography =

The following is a list of films produced by the Art Theatre Guild company of Japan.

== Films produced by Art Theatre Guild ==
Year	Title	Japanese Title	Director	Notes
1967	A Man Vanishes	Ningen Jouhatsu 人間蒸発	Shōhei Imamura	First film co-produced by ATG
1968	Death by Hanging	Kou Shikei 絞死刑	Nagisa Oshima	
1968	Nanami: The Inferno of First Love	Hatsukoi: Jigoku-hen 初恋・地獄篇	Susumu Hani	
1968	The Human Bullet	Nikudan 肉弾	Kihachi Okamoto	
1968	Crazy Love	Kureijī Rabu クレイジーラブ	Michio Okabe	
1969	Double Suicide	Shinju: Ten no Amijima 心中天網島	Masahiro Shinoda	Based on the play The Love Suicides at Amijima
1969	Boy	Shōnen 少年	Nagisa Oshima	
1969	For the Damaged Right Eye	Tsuburekakatta Migime no Tame ni つぶれかかった右眼のために	Toshio Matsumoto	Short film made at the same time as Funeral Parade of Roses using much of the same footage
1969	Funeral Parade of Roses	Bara no Soretsu 薔薇の葬列	Toshio Matsumoto	
1970	Apart from Life	Chi no Mure 地の群れ	Kei Kumai	
1970	The Man Who Left His Will on Film	Tokyo Senso Sengo Hiwa 東京戰争戦後秘話	Nagisa Oshima	
1970	This Transient Life	Mujō 無常	Akio Jissoji	First part of Jissoji's Buddhist trilogy
1970	Heroic Purgatory	Rengoku Eroika 煉獄エロイカ	Yoshishige Yoshida	
1970	Evil Spirits of Japan	Nippon no Akuryo 日本の悪霊	Kazuo Kuroki	
1971	Emperor Tomato Ketchup	Tomato Kecchappu Kōtei トマトケッチャップ皇帝	Shūji Terayama	Experimental film existing in a 28-minute black-and-white version, as well as a 72-minute color-tinted version
1971	Mandara	Mandara 曼陀羅	Akio Jissoji	Second part of Jissoji's Buddhist trilogy
1971	The War of Jan-Ken-Pon	Janken Sensō ジャンケン戦争	Shūji Terayama	Experimental short film
1971	Demons	Shura 修羅	Toshio Matsumoto	
1971	Throw Away Your Books, Rally in the Streets	Sho wo Suteyo Machi he Deyō 書を捨てよ町へ出よう	Shūji Terayama	
1971	The Ceremony	Gishiki 儀式	Nagisa Oshima	
1971	Lost Lovers	Arakajime Ushinawareta Koibito-tachi yo あらかじめ失われた恋人たちよ	Kunio Shimizu and Soichiro Tahara	
1972	Poem	Uta 哥	Akio Jissoji	Third part of Jissoji's Buddhist trilogy
1972	The Morning Schedule	Gozenchu no Jikanwari 午前中の時間割り	Susumu Hani	
1972	Ecstasy of the Angels	Tenshi no Kokotsu 天使の恍惚	Kōji Wakamatsu	pink film
1972	Dear Summer Sister	Natsu no Imōto 夏の妹	Nagisa Oshima	
1972	The Music	Ongaku 音楽	Yasuzo Masumura	Based on a novel by Yukio Mishima
1972	Hymn	Sanka 讃歌	Kaneto Shindō	Based on a novel by Jun'ichirō Tanizaki
1973	The Wanderers	Matatabi 股旅	Kon Ichikawa	
1973	Aesthetics of a Bullet	Teppodama No Bigaku 鉄砲玉の美学	Sadao Nakajima	
1973	Coup d'Etat	Kaigenrei 戒厳令	Yoshishige Yoshida	
1973	Love Betrayed	Kokoro 心	Kaneto Shindō	
1973	Tsugaru Folk Song	Tsugaru Jongarabushi 津軽じょんがら節	Kōichi Saitō	
1974	Himiko	Himiko 卑弥呼	Masahiro Shinoda	
1974	Carol	Kyaroru キャロル	Jin Tatsumura	Documentary following the rock group Carol between March and May 1974
1974	The Assassination of Ryoma	Ryoma Ansatsu 竜馬暗殺	Kazuo Kuroki	Based on a novel by Kazumi Takahashi
1974	It Was a Faint Dream	Asaki Yumemishi あさき夢みし	Akio Jissoji	
1974	Pastoral: To Die in the Country	Den-en ni Shisu 田園に死す	Shūji Terayama	
1975	Love Affair	Meguri Ai めぐり逢い	Kenji Yoshida	
1975	Battle Cry	Tokkan 吶喊	Kihachi Okamoto	
1975	Poetry of the Demon	Oni no Uta 鬼の詩	Tetsutaro Murano	
1975	Death at an Old Mansion	Honjin Satsujin Jiken 本陣殺人事件	Yoichi Takabayashi	Based on the mystery novel The Honjin Murders (1946) by Seishi Yokomizo
1975	Preparation for the Festival	Matsuri no Junbi 祭りの準備	Kazuo Kuroki	
1975	Oh Seagull, Have You Seen the Sparkling Ocean? An Encounter	Kamome yo, Kirameku Umi o Mita ka Meguri Ai 鴎よ、きらめく海を見たか めぐり逢い	Kenji Yoshida	
1976	Temple of the Golden Pavilion	Kinkakuji 金閣寺	Yoichi Takabayashi	Based on the novel by Yukio Mishima
1976	Sea of Genkai	Ninkyou Gaiden Genkai-nada 任侠外伝 玄海灘	Juro Kara	
1976	Variation	Hensōkyoku	Ko Nakahira	
1976	The Youth Killer	Seishun no Satsujinsha 青春の殺人者	Kazuhiko Hasegawa	Based on a novel by Kenji Nakagami
1977	Sacred Mother Kannon	Seibo Kannon Daibosatsu 聖母観音大菩薩	Kōji Wakamatsu	
1977	Japanese Belly Button	Nihonjin no Heso 日本人のへそ	Eizō Sugawa	
1977	Case of the Disjointed Murder	Furenzoku Satsujin Jiken 不連続殺人事件	Chūsei Sone	
1977	The Love and Adventures of Kuroki Taro	Kuroki Tarō no Ai to Bōken 黒木太郎の愛と冒険	Azuma Morisaki	
1977	Double Suicide at Nishijin	Nishijin Shinju 西陣心中	Yoichi Takabayashi	
1977	Kitamura Tokoku - My Winter Song	Kitamura Toukoku: Waga Fuyu no Uta 北村透谷 わが冬の歌	Seiichiro Yamaguchi	Based on the life of Kitamura Tokoku
1978	Puppets Under Starry Skies	Hoshizora no Marionette 星空のマリオネット	Hôjin Hashiura	
1978	Third Base	Sādo サード	Yōichi Higashi	
1978	Double Suicide at Sonezaki	Sonezaki Shinju 曽根崎心中	Yasuzo Masumura	Based on the play by Chikamatsu Monzaemon
1978	At Noon	Mahiru Nari 正午なり	Kōichi Gotō	
1978	Lost Love	Genshiryoku Sensō 原子力戦争	Kazuo Kuroki	Based on the book by Soichiro Tahara
1978	New - No Longer Human	Shin-Ningen Shikkaku 新・人間失格	Kōhei Yoshidome	Based on the novel by Osamu Dazai
1979	Youth Part II	Seishun Part II 青春 PART II	Kōyū Ohara	
1979	No More Easy Life	Mo Hozue wa Tsukanai もう頬づえはつかない	Yōichi Higashi	
1980	Sound of the Tides	Kaichō-on 海潮音	Hōjin Hashiura	
1980	Disciples of Hippocrates	Hipokuratesu-tachi ヒポクラテスたち	Kazuki Ōmori	
1980	Mister, Misses, Miss Lonely	Misutā, Misesu, Misu Ronrī ミスター・ミセス・ミス・ロンリー	Tatsumi Kumashiro	
1981	Empire of Kids	Gaki Teikoku ガキ帝国	Kazuyuki Izutsu	
1981	Distant Thunder	Enrai 遠雷	Kichitaro Negishi	
1981	At This Late Date, The Charleston	Chikagoro Naze ka Chārusuton 近頃なぜかチャールストン	Kihachi Okamoto	
1982	Hear the Wind Sing	Kaze no Uta wo Kike 風の歌を聴け	Kazuki Ōmori	Based on the novel of the same name by Haruki Murakami
1982	Exchange Students	Tenkōsei 転校生	Nobuhiko Obayashi	Also released as I Are You, You Am Me
1982	Tattoo Ari	Irezumi Ari (刺青)あり	Banmei Takahashi	
1982	Ikiteiru Koheiji	Kaidan: Ikiteiru Koheiji 怪異談 生きてゐる小平次	Nobuo Nakagawa	Also known as The Living Koheiji
1983	The Family Game	Kazoku Gēmu 家族ゲーム	Yoshimitsu Morita	
1984	The Deserted City	Haishi 廃市	Nobuhiko Obayashi	
1984	Honeymoon	Mitsugetsu 蜜月	Hōjin Hashiura	
1984	Mermaid Legend	Ningyo Densetsu 人魚伝説	Toshiharu Ikeda	
1984	The Crazy Family	Gyakufunsha Kazoku 逆噴射家族	Sōgo Ishii	
1984	Farewell to the Ark	Saraba Hakobune さらば箱舟	Shūji Terayama	The last film made by Terayama
1984	The Funeral	Osōshiki お葬式	Juzo Itami	
1985	Typhoon Club	Taifū Kurabu 台風クラブ	Shinji Sōmai	
1985	Pale Face	Visage Pâle	Claude Gagnon	Only non-Japanese film produced by ATG
1986	Have You Seen the Barefoot God?	Kimi wa Hadashi no Kami wo Mita ka 君は裸足の神を見たか	Soo-Kil Kim	
