= Soichiro Tahara =

Japanese journalist (born 1934)

- 田原 総一朗
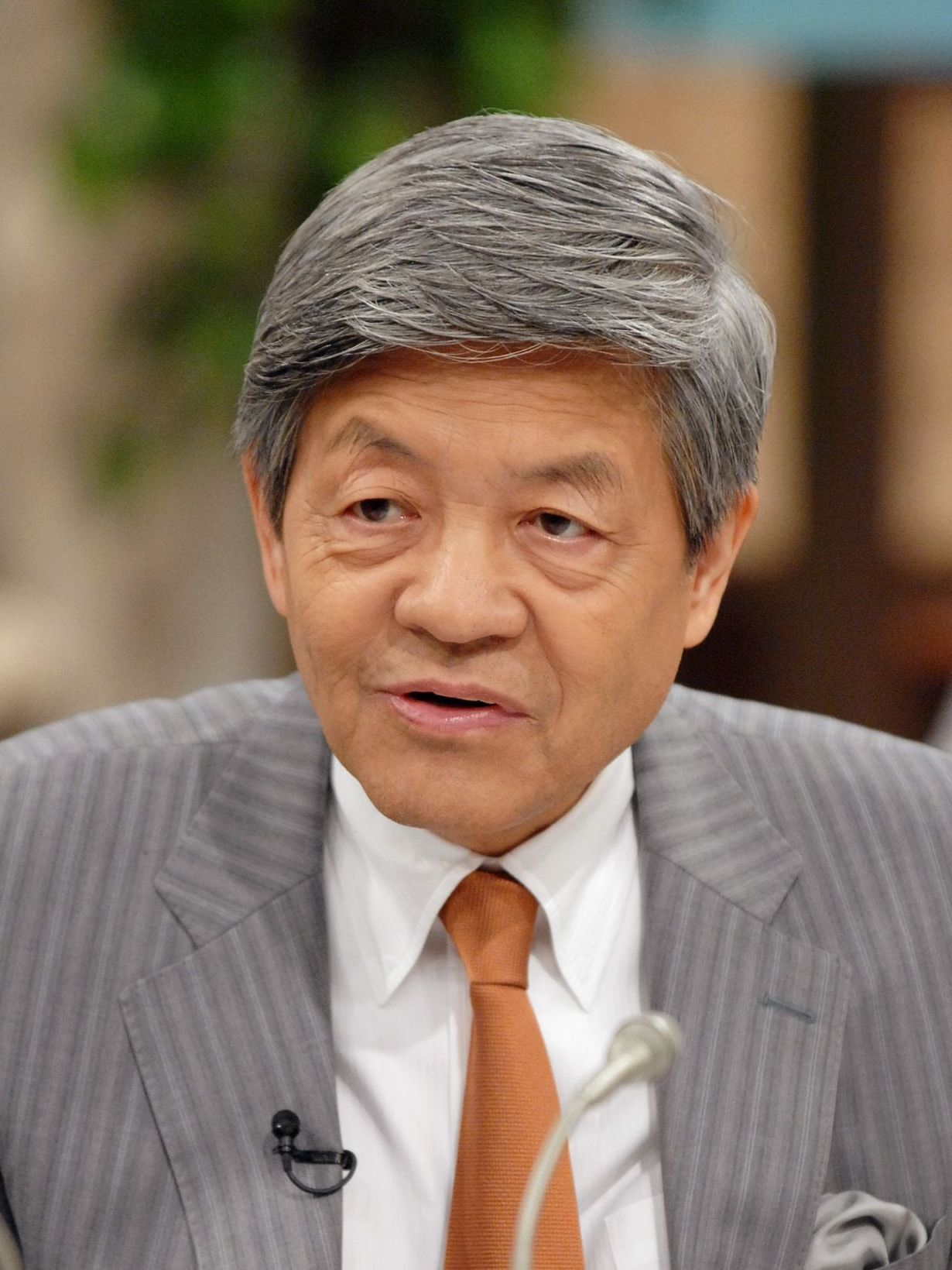
- Born: 15 April 1934 (age 92); Shiga, Japan
- Occupation: Journalist

Soichiro Tahara (田原 総一朗, Tahara Sōichirō; born 15 April 1934) is a Japanese political journalist, best known for hosting TV Asahi's Sunday Project program.

== Career ==
The turning point in Tahara's life came in the summer of 1945. Up until then, he had been taught that Japan was fighting a just war. However, when he returned to school after summer vacation, his teacher started saying the exact opposite: "Japan fought a war of aggression that it should never have fought." This made him question everything he had been taught up to that point. "What was all that I had been taught until now? I can’t trust my teachers, the newspapers, or the radio." This experience became the impetus for him to pursue a career in journalism. Tahara attended Waseda University and began his career at Iwanami Productions, a documentary film production company. He later moved to TV Tokyo where he made a series of groundbreaking television documentaries, before turning freelance in 1976.

In 1971, he co-directed with Kunio Shimizu the fiction film Lost Lovers (Arakajime Ushinawareta Koibitotachi yo) for Art Theatre Guild, which starred Renji Ishibashi and Kaori Momoi.

"Asa Made Nama Televi! (Live TV Until Morning!)," which began in 1987, is a television program where experts engage in discussions from late at night until morning. Tahara continues to serve as the host of this program to this day.
