= Tatsuo Suzuki (cinematographer) =

Japanese cinematographer

Tatsuo Suzuki (鈴木 達夫, Suzuki Tatsuo; born 1935) is a Japanese cinematographer who has worked with many prominent independent directors.

== Career ==
Born in Fukuoka Prefecture, Suzuki entered the film industry at Iwanami Productions (Iwanami Eiga), where he worked on documentary films. Turning freelance and expanding into fiction and avant-garde film, he worked as the cinematographer on many films of the Art Theatre Guild and of directors such as Kazuo Kuroki, Toshio Matsumoto, Noriaki Tsuchimoto, Shūji Terayama, Kazuhiko Hasegawa, and Masahiro Shinoda.

== Awards ==
In 1995, he won the Japan Academy Prize and the Mainichi Film Award for best cinematography for the film Sharaku.

== Selected filmography ==
- On the Road: A Document (ドキュメント路上 Dokyumento rojō) (1964)
- A Story Written with Water (水で書かれた物語 Mizu de kakareta monogatari) (1965)
- Captive's Island (処刑の島 Shokei no shima) (1966)
- Silence Has No Wings (とべない沈黙 Tobenai chinmoku) (1966)
- Woman of the Lake (女のみづうみ Onna no mizuumi) (1966)
- For My Crushed Right Eye (つぶれかかった右眼のために Tsuburekakatta migime no tame ni) (1968)
- Funeral Parade of Roses (薔薇の葬列 Bara no Sōretsu) (1969)
- Demons (A.K.A. Pandemonium) (修羅) (1971)
- Pastoral: To Die in the Country (田園に死す) (1974)
- Himiko (卑弥呼) (1974)
- Lady Snowblood: Love Song of Vengeance (1974)
- Preparation for the Festival (祭りの準備 Matsuri no junbi) (1975)
- The Youth Killer (青春の殺人者 Seishun no satsujinsha) (1976)
- The Man Who Stole the Sun (太陽を盗んだ男 Taiyō o Nusunda Otoko) (1979)
- Grass Labyrinth (草迷宮 Kusa meikyū) (1979)
- Yūgure made (夕暮れまで) (1980)
- Fruits of Passion (Les fruits de la passion) (1981)
- Farewell to the Ark (さらば箱舟 Saraba hakobune) (1984)
- Tomorrow (1988)
- Dogra Magra (ドグラ・マグラ) (1988)
- Childhood Days (少年時代 Shōnen jidai) (1990)
- Sharaku (写楽) (1995)
- Moonlight Serenade (瀬戸内ムーンライト・セレナーデ Setouchi mūnraito serenāde) (1997)
- Owls' Castle (梟の城 Fukurō no shiro) (1999)
- It Is a Long Walk (長崎ぶらぶら節 Nagasaki Burabura Bushi) (2000)
- Love of a Thousand Years: Story of Genji (千年の恋 ひかる源氏物語 Sennen no Koi: Hikaru Genji monogatari) (2001)
- Spy Sorge (スパイ・ソルゲ Supai Soruge) (2003)
- The Face of Jizo (父と暮らせば Chichi to kuraseba) (2004)
