= The Shiranui Sea =

- Directed by: Noriaki Tsuchimoto
- Produced by: Ryūtarō Takagi
- Cinematography: Kōshirō Ōtsu
- Edited by: Noriaki Tsuchimoto; Keiko Ichihara
- Production company: Seirinsha Productions
- Release date: 1975
- Running time: 153 min
- Country: Japan
- Language: Japanese

The Shiranui Sea (不知火海, Shiranuikai) is a 1975 Japanese documentary by Noriaki Tsuchimoto. It is the fourth in a series of independent documentaries that Tsuchimoto made of the mercury poisoning incident, caused by the release of contamnated industrial wastewater, in Minamata, Japan.

== Scenario ==
Four years after Minamata: The Victims and Their World, Tsuchimoto's camera focuses on the everyday lives of the victims of mercury poisoning. Fisherman still knowingly catch and eat the mercury-laden fish caught in the beautiful Shiranui Sea because that is what they have always done and that is how they relate to nature. Some patients who received significant compensation from Chisso, the polluter, may now live in good houses, but without doing work their lives seem somehow empty. The real victims remain the children, who are now getting older and in some cases increasingly conscious of the fact they are different from other children.

== Reception ==
Christopher Small wrote in Cinema Scope: "By the time he made The Shiranui Sea, Tsuchimoto's anger had evidently dissipated, or at least been painfully internalized, as he has evolved into a more measured and contemplative filmmaker. Where Minamata: The Victims and their World (1972) has an all-consuming and disruptive, Ogawa-like intensity to certain of its sequences, in The Shiranui Sea Tsuchimoto is better able to build scenes like unflinching summaries of evidence."

The film scholar Justin Jesty wrote that The Shiranui Sea is "the crowning achievement of Tsuchimoto's first five years of engagement with mercury poisoning. The film is a long and powerful meditation on the depth and breadth of the tragedy."

The documentarist Makoto Satō called The Shiranui Sea "the ultimate masterpiece" of Tsuchimoto's Minamata films.

Filmmaker John Gianvito selected it as one of the ten best films of all time in the 2012 Sight and Sound poll.
