= Murder of Narumi Kurosaki =

Japanese woman murdered in France in 2016

- Location: Besançon, France
- Date: 5 December 2016; 2:30 AM (UTC+1)
- Attack type: Femicide by strangulation
- Victims: Narumi Kurosaki, aged 21
- Perpetrators: Nicolás Zepeda, aged 26
- Verdict: Guilty
- Convictions: Premeditated murder
- Sentence: Life imprisonment

Narumi Kurosaki was a Japanese woman who disappeared in Besançon, France, in December 2016 and is believed to have been murdered. The primary suspect in her case was Nicolás Zepeda, her former boyfriend from Chile, whom she had met while studying in Japan and from whom she had separated two months prior to her disappearance. The international nature of the case drew significant attention, as authorities from three continents—France (Europe), Japan (Asia), and Chile (South America)—were involved in the judicial process.

On 12 April 2022, Zepeda was found guilty of murder and sentenced to 28 years in prison. A retrial began on 4 December 2023, after being postponed from 21 February when Zepeda's defense lawyer, Antoine Vey, withdrew from the case. The retrial concluded on 22 December, upholding the original sentence. On 26 February 2025, the Court of Cassation, France's highest court of appeal, ordered a second retrial, ruling that investigators had withheld evidence from the defense. The second retrial began on 17 March 2026 at the Lyon Criminal Court. On 26 March 2026, Zepeda was again convicted and sentenced to life imprisonment.

== Background ==
Narumi Kurosaki
- 黒崎 愛海
- Born: 23 July 1995; Edogawa, Japan
- Disappeared: 5 December 2016 (aged 21); Besançon, France
- Status: Presumed dead
- Education: University of Tsukuba (no degree); University of Franche-Comté (no degree)
- Occupation: College student
- Partner(s): Nicolás Zepeda (2015–2016); Arthur del Piccolo (2016)

Nicolás Zepeda
- Born: Nicolás Humberto Zepeda Contreras; 11 December 1990 (age 35); Temuco, Chile
- Education: University of Chile; University of Tsukuba
- Occupation: Public administrator
- Partner: Narumi Kurosaki (2015–2016)
- Status: Incarcerated

Narumi Kurosaki (黒崎 愛海, Kurosaki Narumi, born 23 July 1995 in Edogawa, Japan – disappeared 5 December 2016) grew up in a family of five, with her parents and two younger sisters, Honami and Kurumi. From 2011 to 2014, she attended Tokyo Metropolitan Kokusai High School. Narumi was 21 years old when she arrived in France on 26 August 2016 to study at the University of Franche-Comté in Besançon. There, she took French classes at the Center for Applied Linguistics before joining the Faculty of Economics in January. Narumi lived in a student room on the second floor of the Théodore Rousseau residence hall on the La Bouloie campus.

Nicolás Humberto Zepeda Contreras (born 11 December 1990 in Temuco, Chile) was born into a Chilean family of three children. His father, Humberto Zepeda, is a senior executive at the telecommunications provider Movistar. His mother, Ana Luz Contreras, is an engineer who worked as a secretary to Senator Francisco Huenchumilla at the time and also worked in the human resources department of the municipality of La Serena. Nicolás grew up with his twin sisters, Belén and Josefa, in Temuco in southern Chile, attending Colegio Centenario until 2008. In 2009, the family moved to Antofagasta and later to La Serena. Nicolás studied administrative sciences at the University of Chile. After the case became public, various members of Zepeda's family were harassed by journalists.

In 2014, Nicolás arrived in Japan to continue his studies, where he met Narumi in October at a party on the campus of the University of Tsukuba. They began a romantic relationship in February 2015, and the couple traveled to Chile from 6 September to 1 October 2015, where Nicolás introduced her to his family as his partner. Nicolás left Japan in 2015 at the end of the academic year but returned on 12 April 2016 to look for work. According to Nicolás, Narumi officially ended their relationship shortly after arriving in France on 6 October. Zepeda left Japan on 9 October. In Besançon, Narumi met new people, including Arthur del Piccolo, a student at the Higher National School of Mechanics and Microtechnology, who became her new boyfriend.

== Events ==
On Sunday, 4 December 2016, Narumi attended her dance class as usual, leaving at around 4:00 PM. In the early hours of 5 December, around 3:20 AM, approximately fifteen students at Narumi's residence heard screams followed by a thud. Rachel Hope, a British student, messaged a friend: "I'm scared, I heard a noise like someone was being killed." Another student, Nabil Drissi, investigated but could not determine the source of the sounds. The following day, Narumi's classmates noted her absence from class, stating that she had never missed a class before.

Over the next few days, Narumi's family and friends received messages from her phone via text and social media claiming that she had a problem with her passport and needed to go to the Japanese consulate in Lyon. On 6 December, her bank card was used to purchase a one-way train ticket to Lyon. However, Narumi's consular jurisdiction fell under the Japanese consulate in Strasbourg, not Lyon, which had only administrative offices; furthermore, passengers seated near her assigned seat reported not seeing anyone matching her description. Subsequent messages claimed she had a new boyfriend and was traveling alone. No further messages were received after 12 December.

On 14 December, the Center for Applied Linguistics in Besançon alerted the police, who entered Narumi's room on 15 December. Investigators initially suspected Arthur del Piccolo, Narumi's new boyfriend. During his interrogation, Del Piccolo mentioned Nicolás Zepeda, describing him as jealous and possessive, and revealed that Zepeda had hacked his Facebook account. Initially, this information was not considered decisive due to the geographical distance. However, geolocation data from Narumi's phone revealed that she had been at a restaurant on the night of 4 December, and the bill had been paid with a Chilean bank card.

On the night of 4 December, Narumi Kurosaki and Nicolás Zepeda had dinner at La Table de Gustave restaurant in Ornans, approximately 20 kilometres south of Besançon. Surveillance footage recorded them leaving the restaurant at 9:57 PM and arriving at Narumi's dorm at 10:58 PM. According to Zepeda's testimony, the "screams" were Narumi's moans, as the couple allegedly had sex for two and a half hours after arriving at her dorm. On the night of 5 December, Del Piccolo was outside Narumi's apartment and planned to enter until he received messages from her number stating that she had "found someone else" and was leaving him. Zepeda was the last person to see Narumi alive. As of 2026, her body has not been found.

== Investigation ==
=== Narumi's room inspection ===
Police entered Narumi's room (Room 106) on 15 December at 5:31 PM and found it unusually tidy, despite her typically messy habits. Her only coat, laptop, and wallet containing 565 euros were present, but a blanket, suitcase, passport, and phone were missing. Fingerprints on a cup were identified as belonging to Nicolás Zepeda. DNA analysis revealed traces of Zepeda on a water bottle, T-shirt, walls, bathroom floor, and sink. Blood samples from the victim were found on the emergency exit door, which Zepeda used to leave the building.

=== Movements of the suspect ===
Investigators were able to trace Zepeda's movements across Europe with considerable precision using GPS data from his rental car, his mobile phone, and his Banco de Chile Visa card. He arrived in Europe on Tuesday, 29 November 2016 on a flight that landed at Geneva Airport after a stopover in Madrid. The following day, he travelled by FlixBus coach to Dijon, where he collected a rental car he had reserved on 17 November. On Thursday, 1 December, still in Dijon, he visited the Carrefour hypermarket at the Toison d'Or shopping centre, where he purchased a five-litre heating fuel canister, a box of matches, and a chlorine-based cleaning spray. According to GPS data from his rented Renault Scénic, he then spent half a day reconnoitring secondary roads in the vast Chaux Forest, east of the city of Dole.

Between 1 and 4 December, Zepeda travelled back and forth to Besançon each day; GPS antenna records show movements near Narumi's residence hall and the applied linguistics centre where she studied, and on Friday, 2 December, he was seen inside the residence hall by two students with whom he briefly exchanged words. After dining with Narumi on the evening of 4 December, he accompanied her back to her residence hall. His car remained parked outside the building until Tuesday, 6 December, when it began moving again at 4:23 AM; between 5:55 AM and 7:44 AM it was recorded in the same areas of the Chaux Forest as on the previous reconnaissance.

He returned the rental car to Dijon on 7 December at midday. According to employees at the rental agency, the Renault was covered in mud both on the exterior and in the interior on the driver's side and in the boot. He then purchased a bus ticket to Geneva, from where he flew to Barcelona.

Between 7 and 12 December, Zepeda spent several days in Barcelona with his cousin, Juan Felipe Ramírez. On Monday, 12 December—a week after Narumi's disappearance—he travelled back to Geneva to board a flight to Santiago via Madrid, returning to Chile on 13 December and to his apartment in the commune of Las Condes in the urban area of Santiago.

=== Digital data analysis ===
On 5 September 2016, Narumi sent Zepeda an SMS stating, "I will never delete Arthur," after he asked her to remove some Facebook contacts. On 7 September, Zepeda posted a video on Dailymotion discussing his relationship with Narumi in disturbing terms: "She has to pay a little for what she has done and accept that she cannot continue making these kinds of mistakes with someone who loves her." He added, "Certain conditions are applicable during her stay in France, and others are applicable forever. If she cannot follow these conditions for two weeks, within two weeks, I will enforce these conditions with immediate effect."

=== Witness testimonies ===
Juan Felipe Ramírez Contreras, Zepeda's cousin, spent five days with him in Barcelona before his return to Chile. Questioned by Catalan police on 24 January 2017, Ramírez revealed concerning details about their conversations. Zepeda had concealed his meeting with Narumi in Besançon, claiming he was in Europe for a conference in Geneva. As Ramírez was a medical student, Zepeda also enquired about death by suffocation. Zepeda also referred to Narumi in the past tense: "Narumi really liked the sea."

== Judicial process ==
=== Political interventions ===
On 6 January 2017, the case was discussed during a bilateral meeting in Paris between Jean-Marc Ayrault, the French Minister of Foreign Affairs, and his Japanese counterpart Fumio Kishida, who received assurances of France's full cooperation in resolving the investigation. On 15 January 2017, Japan's Parliamentary Vice-Minister for Foreign Affairs, Kentaro Sonoura, met with French authorities on the sidelines of the Middle East peace conference in Paris, before flying to Chile to meet with Foreign Minister Heraldo Muñoz and Attorney General Jorge Abbott. On 21 and 22 January, French President François Hollande, on an official visit to Chile, is believed to have raised the matter, though this has not been confirmed.

=== Extradition of the suspect ===
On 18 May 2020, the Chilean Supreme Court authorized Zepeda's extradition to France. Zepeda, under house arrest in Viña del Mar since June, was transferred to Arturo Merino Benítez International Airport on 23 July 2020 and handed over to French authorities. After a flight to Charles de Gaulle Airport that landed on the morning of 24 July, he was served with the Interpol notice issued on 26 December 2016 and transported by road to Besançon, arriving at around 4:40 PM. He was presented before the examining magistrate, who announced the formal murder charge, and subsequently before the liberty and detention judge, before being imprisoned in the local pre-trial detention centre.

=== Trial against Nicolás Zepeda ===
The trial, referred to as the "Great Trial" by the French Ministry of Justice, began on 29 March 2022 in the Cour d'Assises of Besançon, following the empanelling of the jury the previous day. The accused faced a maximum sentence of life imprisonment. Due to the international scope, the trial featured simultaneous translation by a team of six interpreters—three for Japanese and three for Spanish—and the courtroom displayed three clocks showing the time in France, Japan, and Chile to accommodate time differences. Two additional rooms were opened so that journalists and members of the public could follow the proceedings on large screens. Witnesses from abroad, including ten from Tokyo, two from Santiago, and one from Scotland, testified via videoconference.

Zepeda was defended by Jacqueline Laffont, a lawyer known for representing high-profile clients, including former President Nicolas Sarkozy in the wiretapping case, Alexandre Benalla in the Benalla affair, and former minister Nicolas Hulot in a sexual assault investigation. She was assisted by her associate, Julie Benedetti. Narumi's family was represented by Sylvie Galley, while Arthur del Piccolo was represented by Randall Schwerdorffer, known for his role as defence lawyer in the Daval and Frédéric Péchier cases. The prosecution was led by Étienne Manteaux, Attorney General of Besançon, and the trial was presided over by Matthieu Husson, who had also presided over the Daval case. Zepeda's parents and Narumi's mother and sister attended the trial.

Key evidence included Zepeda's blogspot page, where he shared fictionalized stories about his relationship, and his activity on forums like Smule, last.fm, and DeviantArt. French authorities presented intercepted private messages showing Zepeda's jealousy and possessiveness. Zepeda pleaded not guilty, claiming he did not kill Narumi.

On 12 April 2022, Zepeda was found guilty and sentenced to 28 years in prison. He is expected to serve the first 15 years in France, after which he could be extradited to Chile to serve the remaining 13 years.

=== Retrial ===
Nicolás Zepeda appealed his sentence and a retrial was scheduled to begin on 21 February 2023 before the Cour d'Assises of Haute-Saône in Vesoul. On 15 November 2022, the office of Jacqueline Laffont had sent a letter to the Besançon appeals court announcing the termination of her collaboration with Zepeda by mutual agreement. He was then represented by Antoine Vey, a former associate of Justice Minister Éric Dupond-Moretti.

However, on 18 February, Vey withdrew from the case, informing the court president by letter: "I have been informed that my client no longer wished to maintain my mandate of representation... I inform you that I will not be present on Tuesday morning. The situation will prevent me in conscience from ensuring his defence." This led to a 48-hour suspension of the proceedings. Zepeda's new legal team, Renaud Portejoie of the Clermont-Ferrand bar and Julien Dreyfus of the Paris bar, requested a postponement, which was granted. The trial was rescheduled for 4–20 December 2023.

On 17 November 2023, Julien Dreyfus withdrew from the case, and Zepeda hired Sylvain Cormier of the Lyon bar, known for representing footballer Karim Benzema in the "sextape" case. Zepeda's defense sought to include witnesses who claimed to have seen Narumi alive after her supposed death, including Saïd Nemeri, who alleged she went into hiding with a French soldier.

The retrial began on 4 December 2023. Narumi's second sister, Honami Kurosaki, and Arthur del Piccolo—neither of whom had attended the first trial—were present at these proceedings. On 21 December, the Cour d'Assises of Haute-Saône confirmed Zepeda's guilt and upheld the 28-year prison sentence, with the modification that Zepeda would serve the full term in French prisons rather than the fifteen years in France and thirteen in Chile envisaged by the first verdict. Zepeda's defense immediately announced an appeal to the Court of Cassation.

=== Third trial ===
On 26 February 2025, the Court of Cassation ordered a retrial, citing procedural irregularities in the presentation of evidence—specifically, the use of slides that had not been previously disclosed to the defence. Zepeda, who consistently maintained his innocence, remained incarcerated during the third trial, which began in March 2026. On 25 March, the prosecution announced they would seek 30 years' imprisonment, 2 years longer than the original sentence of 28 years. On 26 March 2026, Zepeda was convicted of premeditated murder and sentenced to life imprisonment. Zepeda's defense team immediately declared their intention to appeal the verdict once more.

== See also ==
- List of solved missing person cases (post-2000)
- Disappearance of Tiphaine Véron
- Murder of Giulia Cecchettin
