= The Weavers of Nishijin =

- Directed by: Toshio Matsumoto
- Written by: Hiroshi Sekine; Toshio Matsumoto
- Produced by: Eiichi Asai
- Starring: Hideo Kanze
- Narrated by: Takeshi Kusaka
- Cinematography: Yoshio Miyajima
- Edited by: Miyuri Miyamori; Fusako Shuzui
- Music by: Akira Miyoshi
- Production company: Kyoto Documentary Film Society
- Release date: 1961
- Running time: 42 minutes
- Country: Japan
- Language: Japanese

The Weavers of Nishijin (西陣(にし じん), Nishijin), also known as Nishijin, is a 1961 Japanese short documentary film directed by Toshio Matsumoto, narrated by Takeshi Kusaka and starring Hideo Kanze as a Noh player. It was written by Hiroshi Sekine and Matsumoto. The film depicts the lives of the textile workers of the Nishijin district of Kyoto.

== Cast ==
- Takeshi Kusaka as narrator
- Hideo Kanze as Noh player

== Reception ==
Film scholar Mitsuyo Wada-Marciano wrote that the film's "depiction of a craftsmen's forced life in the traditional textile trade of Kyoto discloses the multiplicity of the Japanese as well as offering an instance to contemplate the role of cinema as the most popular culture at that time."

In ArtAsiaPacific, Hera Chan wrote that Matsumoto "extracted meaning from the actions and products of traditional Japanese craftsmen, describing lines of silk within a loom like 'the rain of memories,' and shaped the film in a style that rebelled against the superficiality of commercial cinema."
