= Minamata (disambiguation) =

Minamata is a city located in Kumamoto Prefecture, Japan.

Minamata may refer to:

- Minamata: The Victims and Their World, 1971 film
- Minamata (film), 2020 film
