= Yumeno Kyūsaku =

Japanese writer (1889–1936)

- 夢野 久作
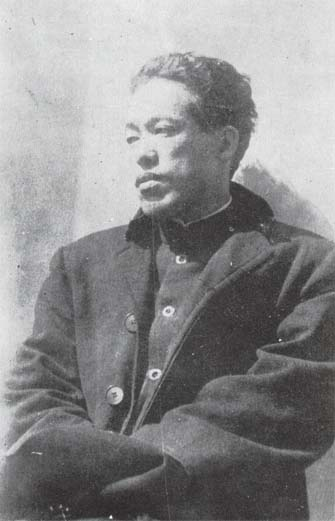
- Yumeno Kyūsaku
- Born: Sugiyama Naoki (杉山 直樹); 4 January 1889; Fukuoka, Japan
- Died: 11 March 1936 (aged 47); Tokyo, Japan
- Occupations: Journalist, detective literature writer
- Relatives: Sugiyama Shigemaru (father); Sugiyama Tatsumaru (son)
- Writing career
- Pen name: Kaijaku Ranpei; Kagutsuchi Midori; Kakumi Dontarō; Unsui (雲水); Hōen (萠円)
- Genres: Detective stories, science fiction, horror
- Notable work: Dogra Magra
- Movements: Romanticism, surrealism

Yumeno Kyūsaku (夢野 久作; 4 January 1889 – 11 March 1936) was the pen name of Sugiyama Yasumichi (杉山 泰道), an early Shōwa period Japanese author, Zen priest, post office director and sub-lieutenant. The pen name roughly means "a person who always dreams". His Dharma name was Goshin-in Gin'en Taidō-koji (悟真院吟園泰道居士). He wrote detective novels and is known for his avant-gardism and his surrealistic, wildly imaginative and fantastic, even bizarre narratives.

== Early life ==
Yumeno was born in Fukuoka city, Fukuoka prefecture as Sugiyama Naoki. His father, Sugiyama Shigemaru, was a major figure in the pre-war ultranationalist organization, the Genyōsha. After graduating from Shuyukan he attended the Literature Department at Keio University, but dropped out on orders from his father, and returned home to take care of the family farm. In 1915 he decided to become a Buddhist priest, but after a couple of years in the monastery, in 1917 he returned home again as Sugiyama Yasumichi. By this time, he had developed a strong interest in the traditional Japanese drama form of Noh, with its genre of ghost stories and supernatural events. He found employment as a freelance reporter for the Kyushu Nippō newspaper (which later became the Nishinippon Shimbun), while writing works of fiction on the side.

== Literary career ==
Kyūsaku's first success was a nursery tale Shiraga Kozō (White Hair Boy, 1922), which was largely ignored by the public. It was not until his first novella, Ayakashi no Tsuzumi (The Spirit Drum, 1924) in the literary magazine Shin-Seinen, that his name became known.

His subsequent works include Binzume jigoku (Hell in the Bottles, 1928), Kori no hate (End of the Ice, 1933), and his most significant novel Dogura Magura (Dogra Magra, 1935), which is considered a precursor of modern Japanese science fiction and was adapted for a 1988 movie directed by Toshio Matsumoto and starring Shijaku Katsura II, Hideo Murota, and Yōji Matsuda.

Dogra Magra exemplifies modern Japanese avant-garde gothic literature. In the story, the protagonist/narrator wakes up in a hospital with amnesia. He finds out that he was the subject of an experiment by a now-dead psychiatrist, and the doctors are working to bring back his memories. It is not clear whether he was a psychotic killer or the victim of a strange psychological experiment, but it is told that he killed his mother and wife and that he inherited his psychotic tendencies from an insane ancestor. The novel is strongly influenced by Freudian psychoanalysis and, through Yumeno's contacts there, provides considerable historical insight into the development of the study of psychoanalysis at Kyushu Imperial University.

Kyūsaku died of a cerebral hemorrhage in 1936 while talking with a visitor at home.

== Works in translation ==
=== English translation ===
Short stories

- "Love After Death" (original title: Shigo no Koi) (Modanizumu: Modernist Fiction from Japan, 1913-1938, University of Hawaii Press, 2008)
- "Hell in a Bottle" (original title: Binzume Jigoku) (Three-Dimensional Reading: Stories of Time and Space in Japanese Modernist Fiction, 1911-1932, University of Hawaii Press, 2013)
- "Hell in Bottles" (original title: Binzume Jigoku) (The Nashville Review, Volume 25, Vanderbilt University, 2018)
- "Building" (original title: Birudingu) (The Literary Review, Volume 60 No 2: Physics, Farleigh Dickinson University, 2017)
- "An Insect's Life," "The Strangled Corpse," and "Unwritable Detective Stories" (Original titles: Mushi no seimei, Ishitai, Kakenai tantei shôsetsu) (The electronic journal of contemporary Japanese studies,Volume 23, Issue 3, 2023),

Novel

- "The Spirit Drum" (original title: Ayakashi no Tsuzumi) (Arigatai Books, 2019, translated by J.D. Wisgo)
- "Kaimu: A Collection of Disturbing Dreams" (original title: Kaimu) (Arigatai Books, 2021, translated by J.D. Wisgo)

Essay

- "Terrifying Tokyo" (included in Tokyo Stories: A Literary Stroll, University of California Press, 2002, translated by Lawrence Rogers)
- "Dust" (original title: Chiri) (World Literature Today, 2018, translated by Sacha Idell)

=== French translation ===
Novel

- "Dogra Magra" Philippe Picquier 2003, translated by Patrick Honnoré . ISBN 2-87730-645-3
- "Le Tambour d'Ayakashi" (original title: Ayakashi no Tsuzumi) Philippe Picquier 2025, translated by Sophie Bescond .

=== Spanish translation ===
Short stories

- El infierno de las chicas [The hell of the girls] (in Spanish), Satori, 2014, ISBN 978-84-941920-7-4.
- El infierno embotellado. Y otros relatos de obsesión [Hell in Bottles. And other tales of obsession] (in Spanish), translated by Daniel Aguilar, Satori, 2026, ISBN 978-84-10404-06-9.

=== Polish translation ===
Short stories

- "Piekło w butelkach" (original title: Binzume Jigoku) (Tajfuny, 2021, translated by Andrzej Świrkowski)

Novel

- "Przeklęty bębenek" (original title: Ayakashi no tsuzumi) (Kirin, 2021, translated by Anna Grajny)

=== Russian translation ===
Novel

- Догра Магра (original title: Dogura Magura) (Издательство книжного магазина «Желтый двор», 2021, translated by Anna Slashcheva) ISBN 9785604534380
