= White Hole (film) =

- Directed by: Toshio Matsumoto
- Music by: Joji Yuasa
- Distributed by: Uplink (2006) (DVD)
- Release date: 1979
- Running time: 6 minutes
- Country: Japan

White Hole (Japanese: ホワイトホール, Hepburn: Howaito Hōru) is a 1979 Japanese experimental film by Toshio Matsumoto. The music was composed by Joji Yuasa.

== Summary ==
A mesmerizing trip through the psychedelic vastness of space.

== Reception ==
Artforum wrote: "White Hole examines Matsumoto’s metaphysical quests amid his study of the Upanishads."
