= Demons (1971 film) =

- Directed by: Toshio Matsumoto
- Written by: Toshio Matsumoto
- Produced by: Tsuyoshi Koga; Takayoshi Miyagawa
- Cinematography: Tatsuo Suzuki
- Edited by: Toshie Iwasa
- Music by: Bunichi Nishimatsu
- Release date: 1971
- Running time: 134 min.
- Country: Japan
- Language: Japanese

Demons (Japanese: 修羅), also known as Shura and Pandemonium, is a 1971 Japanese film written and directed by Toshio Matsumoto. The film is based on a kabuki written in the 19th century by the playwright Tsuruya Nanboku. It was released in 1971 in Japan and received a limited release in the United States in 1974.

== Plot ==
The story centers around a samurai, Gengobe, who is in love with a geisha, Koman. Koman has a tattoo pledging eternal faithfulness to Gengobe despite her profession. Gengobe has the choice of paying a debt of 100 ryō to his masters or buying the geisha off from her controllers, and he chooses Koman; however, she colludes with Sangoro, who is her husband (or pretends to be so) and the father of her infant son. Gengobe flies into a rage and kills five people in his pursuit of Koman and Sangoro, becoming a wanted man.

Koman and Sangoro survive and flee, and Gengobe eventually finds them, offering a truce. Gengobe is discovered by law officials, but his servant, Hachiemon, pretends to have been the murderer, using a precious hairpin as a key piece of evidence, and is arrested instead. Gengobe pretends to forgive Sangoro and Koman, and they are shown to be gleefully unrepentant about getting away with their lives and the money; however, Gengobe has given them poisoned sake, which is instead drunk by Koman's brother after he has demanded some of the 100 ryo from them. Sangoro and the brother get into a dispute over a valuable map, and as they fight, the poison begins to take hold. The brother believes he has been deliberately poisoned, and Sangoro strangles him. Koman disposes of the body in a well.

Gengobe, on the verge of madness, returns to find Koman alive and confronts her, discovering that she has altered her tattoo to say she loves Sangoro. Koman denounces him as a demon; he says she has made him into one. He forces her to stab her own son and then murders her, after which he severs her head, sets it on a shrine, and philosophizes with it. Sangoro's father begs for Sangoro's life, but after Gengobe shows him the severed head, Sangoro, wracked with guilt over both Koman and her brother, emerges from hiding and commits seppuku. Gengobe finishes off Sangoro's writhing body and walks outside in a daze.

== Cast ==
- Katsuo Nakamura - Gengobe
- Juro Kara - Sangoro
- Yasuko Sanjo - Koman
- Masao Imafuku - Hachiemon
- Kappei Matsumoto - Ryoshin
- Tamotsu Tamura - Yasuke
- Hideo Kanze - Takubei
- Shinji Amano - Inosuke
- Hatsuo Yamaya - Chohachi
- Yusuke Minami - Kankuro
- Takashi Ebata - Torazo
- Atsuko Kawaguchi - Kikuno
