= Shift (film) =

- Promotional image
- Directed by: Toshio Matsumoto
- Edited by: Junosuke Okuyama
- Music by: Yosuke Inagaki
- Distributed by: Uplink (2006) (DVD)
- Release date: 1982
- Running time: 8 minutes
- Country: Japan

Shift (Japanese: シフト：断層 Hepburn: Shifuto: Dansō) is a 1982 Japanese short experimental film directed by Toshio Matsumoto.
