= Noriaki Tsuchimoto =

Japanese documentary film director (1928–2008)

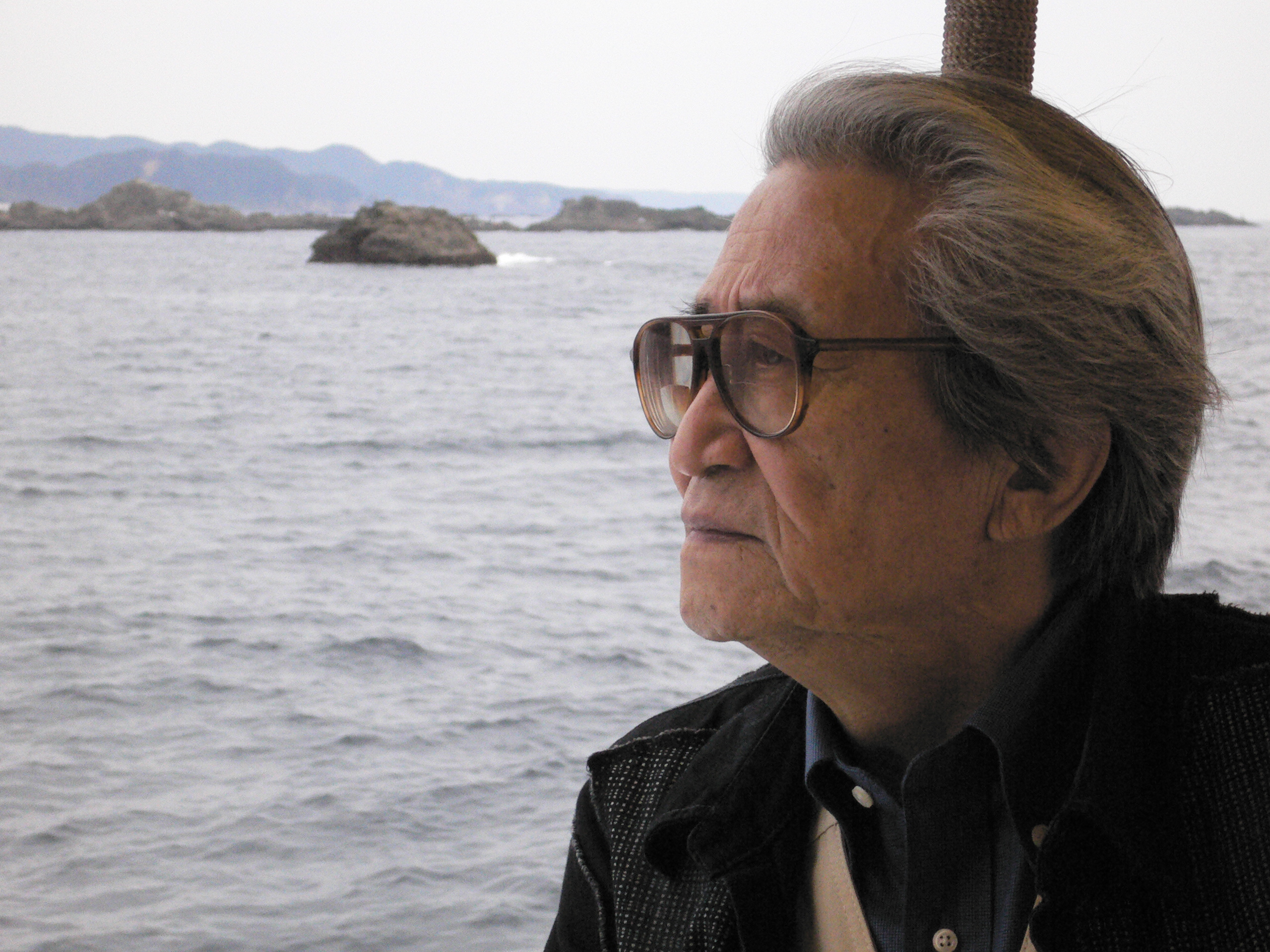
- Noriaki Tsuchimoto in 2005
- Born: 11 December 1928; Gifu Prefecture
- Died: 24 June 2008 (aged 79)
- Occupation: Documentary film director
- Known for: Minamata: The Victims and Their World

Noriaki Tsuchimoto (土本典昭, Tsuchimoto Noriaki) (11 December 1928, in Gifu Prefecture, Japan – 24 June 2008) was a Japanese documentary film director known for his films on Minamata disease and examinations of the effects of modernization on Asia. Tsuchimoto and Shinsuke Ogawa have been called the "two figures [that] tower over the landscape of Japanese documentary."

== Early years ==
Tsuchimoto was born in Gifu Prefecture, but raised in Tokyo. Angered by the emperor system that led Japan into war, he participated in radical student groups like Zengakuren when he entered Waseda University and joined the Japanese Communist Party. For a time he was even involved in the JCP's plan for armed revolt in the mountains and also was arrested for participating in protests. Expelled from Waseda in 1953, he could initially only find work at the Japan-China Friendship Society until he ran into Keiji Yoshino, a filmmaker and executive at Iwanami Productions (Iwanami Eiga), a branch of Iwanami Shoten devoted to making educational and public relations (PR) documentaries. Inspired by Susumu Hani's film Children of the Classroom, he accepted Yoshino's offer to join Iwanami in 1956. He left the JCP in 1957.

== Iwanami era ==
Tsuchimoto was only an employee at Iwanami Productions for a year (after that, he worked there as a hired freelancer), but he made films alongside other important directors such as Hani, Shinsuke Ogawa, Kazuo Kuroki, and Yōichi Higashi, and cameramen like Jun'ichi Segawa, Tatsuo Suzuki, and Masaki Tamura. The works he made were primarily sponsored by Japanese corporations celebrating their achievements in a period of high economic growth, but the intellectually liberal Iwanami was "a hot bed of experimentation," in the words of film scholar Mark Nornes; a place where, according to Tsuchimoto, people wanted to do "their own individual shots that could only be done in images not in words." Tsuchimoto's most famous work for Iwanami was An Engineer's Assistant (1963), a film made for the Japanese National Railways about train engineers working hard to keep on time.

Conflicts with sponsors and the company inevitably resulted at Iwanami, and it was in particular one controversy over two of Tsuchimoto's contributions to a series of documentaries on Japan's prefectures that led the filmmakers to form the "Blue Group" (Ao no Kai), an informal organization in which members discussed each other's films and advocated for a new documentary. Many in the Blue Group later left Iwanami to begin producing documentaries independently.

One other film Tsuchimoto directed during this period was On the Road: A Document (1963), a film commissioned by the Tokyo Metropolitan Police to promote traffic safety just before the Tokyo Olympics. Tsuchimoto, however, worked with a cab driver's union to produce a strong condemnation of urban Japan seen through the eyes of a taxi driver. The film won several awards, but the Police refused to show it and it remained on the shelf for years.

== Independent filmmaking ==
Tsuchimoto was one of the first Iwanami-related directors to go independent. In 1965, he began a documentary for television on an exchange student who was under threat of being deported back to Malaysia, despite the fact he would likely be punished for his political activities upon his return. The network withdrew when problems arose with the Malaysian government, but Tsuchimoto decided to make the film, Exchange Student Chua Swee Lin, anyway. Gathering donations, he placed his camera firmly on the student's side and eventually prevented the deportation. In Nornes's words, "This is a movie that started a movement rather than represented it," and became a model for later committed independent documentary.

After making Prehistory of the Partisans, which showed student radicals at Kyoto University from inside the barricades, for Ogawa Productions, Tsuchimoto began his most famous work, a series of documentaries about the mercury poisoning incident in Minamata, Japan. Disturbed that an earlier effort to film Minamata disease for a television documentary had met with resistance from those afflicted, apparently due to suspicions about the media, Tsuchimoto this time dedicated himself to working with the victims. In the first, and most famous film in the series, Minamata: The Victims and Their World (1971), he let the victims speak for themselves, giving their side of the story, which was not being represented in the mass media or recognized by Chisso, the polluter, and the government. He did not just show their plight to others, but worked to show his films in the area to educate other victims. According to the critic Chris Fujiwara, "Tsuchimoto’s cinema embodies a search for a point of view capable of representing the point of view of his subjects, and an immersion of the filmmaker’s subjectivity in the contradictions of his material."

Some films in the series, such Minamata Disease: A Trilogy, were primarily focused on the medical issues of Minamata disease, not just the politics. And as in Minamata: The Victims and Their World and The Shiranui Sea (1975), he did not look on the victims as objects of pity or agents of protest, but endeavored to understand their world, finding in their struggle to maintain their close relationship with the sea and their traditional ways of living, much of which had been upset by environmental pollution, "the original figure of humanity."

Tsuchimoto made around a dozen films about Minamata, but he also worked on many other subjects, ranging from the poet Shigeharu Nakano to the plight of Koreans in Japan. A number of his films extended in concerns with pollution, the sea, and the costs of political oppression and modernization by exploring the atomic bomb and nuclear energy. He was also interested in Afghanistan, and made three films about that country before the Taliban, such as Afghan Spring and Another Afghanistan: Kabul Diary 1985. He also published several books and was a featured filmmaker at the 2003 Flaherty Seminar.

He died of lung cancer on 24 June 2008.

== Selected filmography ==
- An Engineer's Assistant Aru kikan joshi (ある機関助士) (1963)
- On the Road: A Document Dokyumento rojō (ドキュメント路上) (1964)
- Exchange Student Chua Swee Lin Ryûgakusei Chua Sui Rin (留学生チュア・スイ・リン) (1965)
- The World of the Siberians Shiberiya-jin no sekai (シベリヤ人の世界) (1968)
- Prehistory of the Partisans Paruchizan zenshi (パルチザン前史) (1969)
- Minamata: The Victims and Their World Minamata: Kanjasan to sono sekai (水俣ー患者さんとその世界) (1971)
- Minamata Disease: A Trilogy Igaku to shite no Minamata-byō: Sanbusaku (医学としての水俣病ー三部作) (1974–1975)
- The Shiranui Sea Shiranuikai (不知火海) (1975)
- Remembering Nakano Shigeharu Shinobu Nakano Shigeharu (偲ぶ・中野重治) (1979)
- Tsuchimoto Noriaki's Nuclear Scrapbook Genpatsu kirinukichō (原発切抜帖) (1982)
- Afghan Spring Yomigaere Karēzu (よみがえれカレーズ) (1989)
- Another Afghanistan: Kabul Diary 1985 Mō hitotsu no Afuganisutan: Kāburu nikki 1985-nen (もうひとつのアフガニスタン カーブル日記 1985年) (2003)
- Traces: The Kabul Museum 1988 Arishihi no Kāburu Hakubutsukan 1988-nen (在りし日のカーブル博物館1988年) (2003)
