= Minamata: The Victims and Their World =

- Directed by: Noriaki Tsuchimoto
- Produced by: Ryūtarō Takagi
- Cinematography: Kōshirō Ōtsu
- Edited by: Noriaki Tsuchimoto; Takako Sekizawa
- Production company: Higashi Productions
- Release date: 1971
- Running time: 167 minutes
- Country: Japan
- Language: Japanese

Minamata: The Victims and Their World (水俣 患者さんとその世界; Minamata: Kanja-san to sono sekai), also known as Minamata, is a 1971 Japanese black and white documentary film by Noriaki Tsuchimoto. It is the first in a series of 17 independent documentaries that Tsuchimoto made about the mercury poisoning incident in Minamata, Japan. Subsequent films in the series include Minamata Disease: A Trilogy (1975) and The Shiranui Sea (1975).

== Synopsis ==
The film focuses on residents of Minamata and nearby communities who suffered nervous system damage or were born deformed, due to the ingestion of fish contaminated from mercury released into the sea by a fertilizer factory owned by Chisso. It not only shows their current condition and the hardships borne by their families, but also the discrimination they had suffered from other Minamata residents, the insufficient response by Chisso, the slowness of government action, and the problems faced by victims who had not been officially designated as suffering from Minamata disease.

Tsuchimoto portrays victims ranging from fishermen and the elderly to children born with congenital Minamata disease. The disease ranges in severity and symptoms.Themes carried throughout these different stories include the immense love of the caretakers and the guardians for those suffering from Minamata disease, as well as worries about these victims’ future when their families pass away. By showing how some families make the most out of their situation and that rehabilitation is possible, Tsuchimoto humanizes the people ostracized by the community because of their association with Minamata disease. The documentary takes the side of the victims in their struggle, but it also devotes much time to understanding their lifestyle, especially their traditions and their close relationship with the sea.

The main action of the last part of the film is the effort of victims and their supporters to buy shares of Chisso in small quantities so that they can attend the annual stockholders' meeting and confront the corporate leadership. The Minamata demonstrators aim to address the managers and directors of Chisso to no avail, resulting in the demonstrators crowding around the directors. Through heart-wrenching tirades, the demonstrators express their demands for recognition and reparations. It is through powerful scenes such as these that Tsuchimoto’s message of demanding justice is conveyed most effectively. With the more recent environmental disasters such as the March 2011 Fukushima Daiichi nuclear disaster, Tsuchimoto’s documentary remains relevant and brings up the issues of lack of government and corporate responsibility.

== Production ==
As a student activist who identified as a Communist, Tsuchimoto was angered by Chisso, the government, and medical institutions, which he saw as complicit in the Minamata disease victims’ suffering. Having used cinema to portray the lives of Tokyo taxi drivers in his breakthrough film On the Road: A Document (1964), contributing to the Minamata disease victims’ struggle for recognition and reparations through cinema was a natural response for Tsuchimoto. Hence, Minamata: The Victims and Their World came to be without any funding from sponsors. Instead, producer Ryūtarō Takagi essentially crowdsourced funds to produce this documentary as well as future films in the series.

Upon criticism for not including any details on the medical aspects of the Minamata disease, Tsuchimoto, who had intended for Minamata: The Victims and Their World to be his only documentary on the disease, continued his documentary series with the films Minamata Disease: A Trilogy and The Shiranui Sea. New opportunities simultaneously arose: after the court ruling on the Minamata case in 1973, Tsuchimoto was able to use the Medical Faculty of Kumamoto University’s film intended for academic use, which had been mostly undisclosed during the making of Minamata: The Victims and Their World.

== Reception ==
Critic Nigel Andrews wrote in The Monthly Film Bulletin: "Its opening section gives an outline of the chief historical events. ... The closing sequence records the violent, climactic confrontation between the white-robed villagers and the chemical company's president at the annual shareholders' meeting. Between these sections, the main body of the film consists chiefly of Tsuchimoto's interviews with the victims or their families. ... After the steady, piecemeal documentation of the film's middle section, Tsuchimoto restores dramatic momentum with the account of the shareholders' trip to the city to challenge the chemical company's president. As the meeting grows from confusion to riot to hysteria, Tsuchimoto turns his camera suddenly on a savage one-to-one confrontation between the president, smiling weakly through his spectacles at the gathering chaos before him, and an old woman from the village who stands shrieking tearful imprecations at him from point-blank range across the conference table. It's the one and only moment of outright anger – and release – that Tsuchimoto allows us in the course of his meticulous and diligent presentation of fact."

Variety wrote: "Ecology is a world concern and point of contention these days. This film does not try to exploit it, nor is it propagandist or didactic. It is a deeply-felt look at the effects of industrial wastes on humans in a Japanese fishing village over a period of seven years ... film just allows the people involved to speak plus the civic and social actions taken and also gives an insight into village life and its innocent victims."

The director and critic Mark Cousins considers it as one of "ten documentaries that shook the world."

Sight and Sound wrote: "The body of work Tsuchimoto devoted to the victims, their families and their surroundings encompassed 17 films, of which Minamata: The Victims and Their World is the most widely known. Tsuchimoto isn't afraid to let his camera roll for extended shots of afflicted patients, with results that are alternately harrowing, tender and deeply sad. He also commits himself to the texture and details of the everyday lives of the people of Minamata: a striking sequence shows an octopus fisherman trudging through shallow water, the many-tentacled bundle of his catch dangling behind him on a rope. In such scenes, the film suggests life continuing and the possibility of renewal."

Alex Dudok de Wit, writing in The Daily Telegraph, called it "one of the angriest films ever made."

Director Claude Lanzmann stated: "Tsuchimoto is such a marvelous film-maker, such a rigorous creator, that I followed the film passionately, without ever losing the thread.”

The Museum of the Moving Image called the film "A monumental achievement in documentary history and a triumph of independent film distribution (Tsuchimoto personally presented the film across Japan and the world, including on a hundred-plus day tour of Canada, whose indigenous communities were also found to be stricken with Minamata disease), Minamata brought global awareness to the scope and perils of the disease and led to hundreds of diagnoses."

== Accolades ==
- Silver Award at the 1972 Bern Film Festival
- 3rd Place at the 1972 Locarno Film Festival
- Film Ducat at the Mannheim-Heidelberg International Film Festival.

== Versions ==
The original Japanese film is 167 minutes long. The version currently available on DVD with English subtitles is 120 minutes long and was first prepared by Tsuchimoto for international environmental conferences and film festivals.

== See also ==
- The Shiranui Sea
