= Disappearance of Tiphaine Véron =

Unsolved 2018 missing person case in Japan

Tiphaine Véron
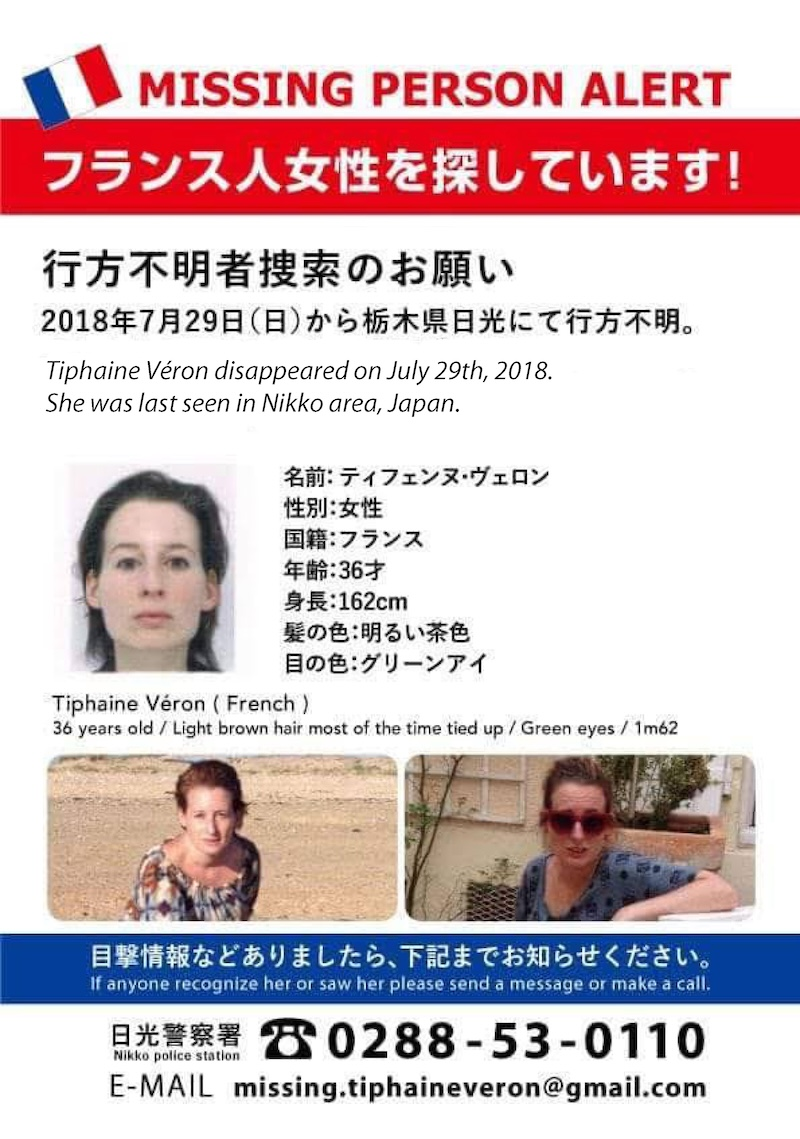
- Born: 22 July 1982; Rennes, France
- Disappeared: 29 July 2018 (aged 36); Nikkō, Tochigi Prefecture, Japan
- Status: Unresolved
- Known for: Missing person
- Height: 165 cm (5 ft 5 in)

Tiphaine Véron is a French tourist who went missing in Japan at age 36, on 29 July 2018. She had traveled alone to the rural city of Nikkō in Tochigi Prefecture, about 150 km north of Tokyo. She was last seen having breakfast in her hotel.

The case has drawn attention due to perceived contrasts in investigative procedures between Japan and Western or European approaches to missing persons.

In January 2023, the investigation was reopened in France by the cold case unit of Nanterre, which announced plans to travel to Nikkō in early 2024.

== Background ==
=== Tiphaine Véron ===
Tiphaine Véron was born on 22 July 1982, in Rennes. She lived in Poitiers from 1984. She held a degree in art history and had studied Russian and Japanese. She developed drug-resistant epilepsy in early adulthood, but after years of treatment, her condition stabilized and allowed her to lead a normal life. At the time of her trip to Japan, she was working as a school assistant for children with disabilities in Poitiers.

=== Disappearances in Japan ===
In Japan, the unexplained disappearance of an adult is not automatically treated as a criminal case unless there is clear evidence of foul play. Japanese law also restricts access to individuals' personal data. Each year, about 100,000 people go missing in Japan, many voluntarily. Known as jōhatsu ("the evaporated"), many choose to vanish due to financial shame or social pressure. Police investigations into such cases are often limited unless a crime or accident is proven.

== Timeline ==
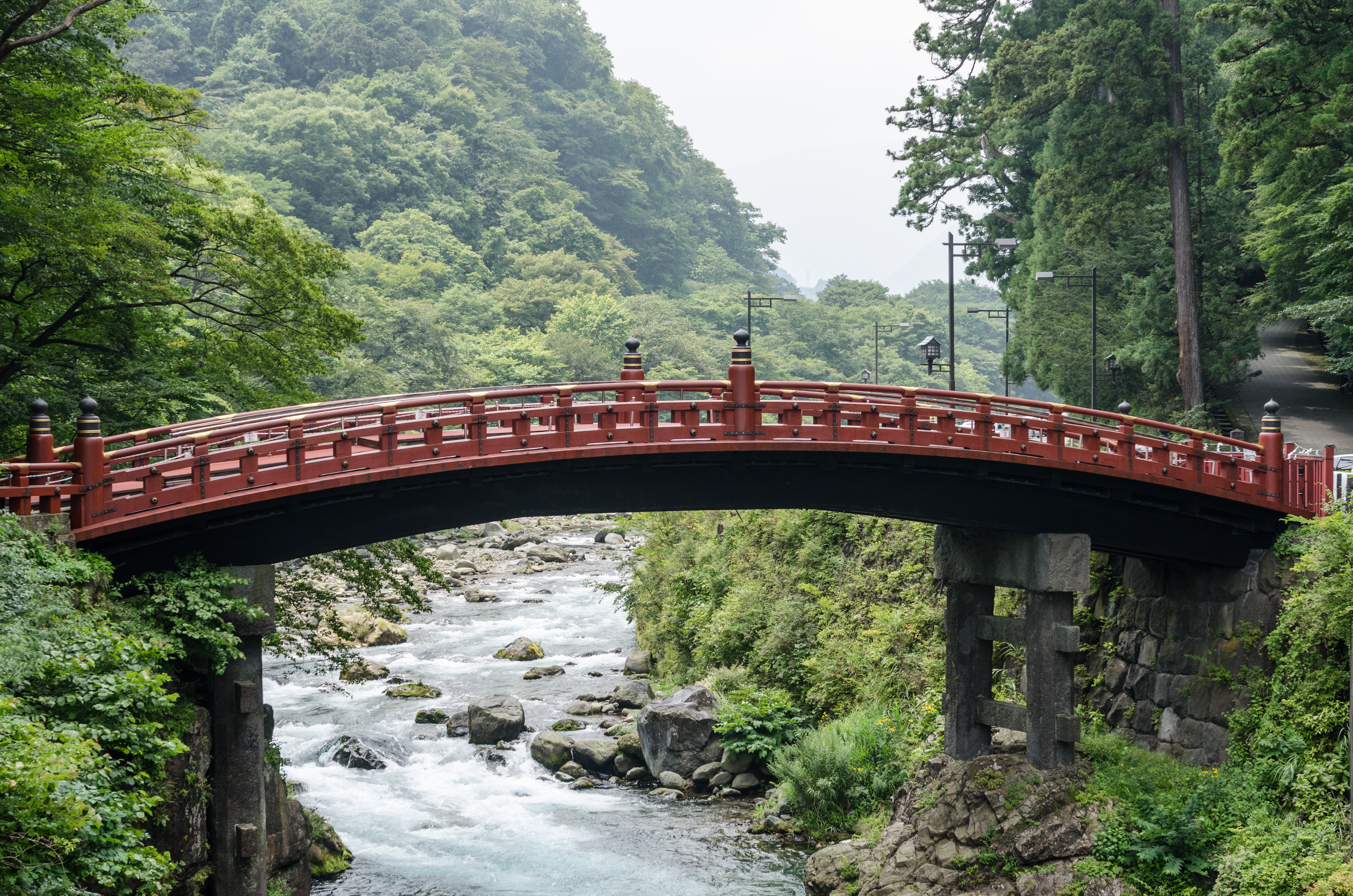
The Sacred Bridge at Futarasan shrine, filmed by Tiphaine Véron the day before her disappearance.

Véron landed at Narita International Airport on 27 July 2018. She had planned a three-week solo trip, meticulously documented in handwritten notes. After a first night in Tokyo, she traveled to Nikkō on 28 July.

Surveillance cameras show her walking to her hotel, Turtle Inn, where she arrived between 4:00 and 4:30 PM and shared photos via WhatsApp. Due to the late hour and the presence of Typhoon Jongdari, she stayed in.

On 29 July, she had breakfast between 8:30 and 9:30 AM; another guest photographed her at 8:41. Later, accounts diverge. The hotel manager claimed she left around 9:53 or 9:54 AM, but her phone continued to ping from the room for some time afterward.

On 30 July, at 10:30 AM, hotel staff entered her room and found her belongings untouched, including her passport. The police were contacted.

== Theories ==
=== Criminal hypothesis: abduction or assault ===
One of the primary hypotheses is the involvement of a third party. The region of Nikkō saw a series of violent incidents in the months following Véron's disappearance. In August 2018, a human skull was found near the railway in Nikko. A few weeks later, two women were found with their throats slit in a Nikko parking lot. On 9 October 2018, an unidentified body was discovered on the bank of the Daiya River; in December 2018 and January 2019, human bones were recovered in the surrounding forest. On 19 January 2022, a dismembered body was found in a suitcase in Nikko. A private investigator hired by the family between 2018 and 2022 said 15 bodies were found and 33 people were victims of sexual assault in Tochigi Prefecture.

In 2019, a sign near the Takinoo-jinja shrine (close to Shiraito Falls, which Tiphaine had planned to visit) warned about a man who "physically touched people after posing as a guide". The family's private investigator found testimonies from Japanese women on Instagram describing a groper in that area. Police confirmed to the family that the man was known to them but had not been seen since January 2018.

This "fake guide" theory is considered plausible. It could explain the sudden stop in her phone activity, the lack of traces, and the absence of immediate alerts. To date, no suspect has been identified, but the family continues to seek witnesses and information.

Among potential suspects, the hotel manager has been scrutinized: he was the last known person to see Véron alive, and his statements about her departure time are inconsistent. Large stains—possibly blood—were reportedly found using luminol on the wall of her room, but no forensic analysis results have been shared publicly.

There have been no ransom demands or confirmed suspects, but a criminal scenario remains plausible.

=== Accidental death ===
Véron could also have fallen into a river or had a fatal encounter with wildlife in the forests of Nikkō; Japanese authorities initially favored this theory. Rivers were searched, and a scarf was found near one waterway. Her family disputes this scenario, however, pointing out that no flood occurred that day and that Tiphaine never wore a scarf. Her belongings, left untouched in the room, further undermine this theory.

=== Epileptic seizure ===
Véron had a history of epilepsy, but it was well controlled by medication. Some media outlets suggested a seizure may have occurred, but there is no hospital record or witness to such an event. She was reportedly healthy and cheerful on the morning she disappeared.

=== Voluntary disappearance or suicide ===
The idea that Véron deliberately disappeared is, according to her family, the least credible hypothesis. She had made extensive plans, stayed in contact with her family, and left behind all her belongings. As a committed school assistant with a passion for Japan, she was sending frequent, cheerful updates to her family.

The suicide theory, though briefly considered early in the case, is also unsupported by any evidence. Véron had just fulfilled a lifelong dream of visiting Japan and had booked a return ticket. No body or personal item was ever found in areas where suicide would be plausible.

Her relatives and legal representatives have rejected both the voluntary disappearance and suicide scenarios.

== Investigations ==
=== Initial investigation (2018–2019) ===
On 1 August 2018, Véron's family was notified by the French embassy in Japan. Her sister and two brothers flew to Japan on 6 August and participated in the search, alongside local police. Her mother, Anne Désert, wrote a letter to President Emmanuel Macron, requesting "more investigative resources", lamenting that "not all possible means are being employed".

On 9 September, her sister, Sibylle, launched a public appeal to tourists who were in Nikkō at the time, asking for photos. On 17 October, during a visit by Japanese Prime Minister Shinzō Abe to France, Sibylle approached Macron in the courtyard of the Élysée Palace.

A solidarity march was held in Poitiers on 10 November 2018, with about 500 people joining to demand clarity and continue raising awareness.

From 7 to 17 May 2019, a search mission involving mountain rescue experts was carried out in Japan but yielded no results. The family returned in late July 2019 for a demonstration in Nikkō to mark one year since Véron's disappearance.

In early August 2019, a new search effort took place near the hotel with Véron's brother, Damien, five volunteers, and seven search dogs, again without finding anything.

=== Family's position ===
After extensive searches in May 2019, the family declared they no longer believed the accident hypothesis and planned further missions to continue the investigation. They also expressed doubt over the completeness of the file transmitted to French authorities.

They pointed to contradictions in witness statements, especially regarding the hotel's timeline. The family also examined Véron's Google Maps data, which traced her movements from her arrival until 11 on 29 July, when her Wi-Fi signal disappeared.

=== Family-led initiatives and public mobilization ===
Véron's relatives founded the association Unis pour Tiphaine ("united for Tiphaine").

Xavier Niel, founder of Free, responded to the family's outreach and contributed technically to the investigation. He helped confirm that Véron's phone was not turned off in a regular way, but violently—either by physical destruction or battery removal.

In July 2020, comedian Élie Semoun posted a video on social media, appealing for information

Japanese retiree Kazunari Watanabe became a local ally, reportedly visiting Nikkō over 40 times to assist the family.

The family remains committed to the possibility that Tiphaine is still alive, perhaps being held captive.

=== Renewed investigations (2019–present) ===
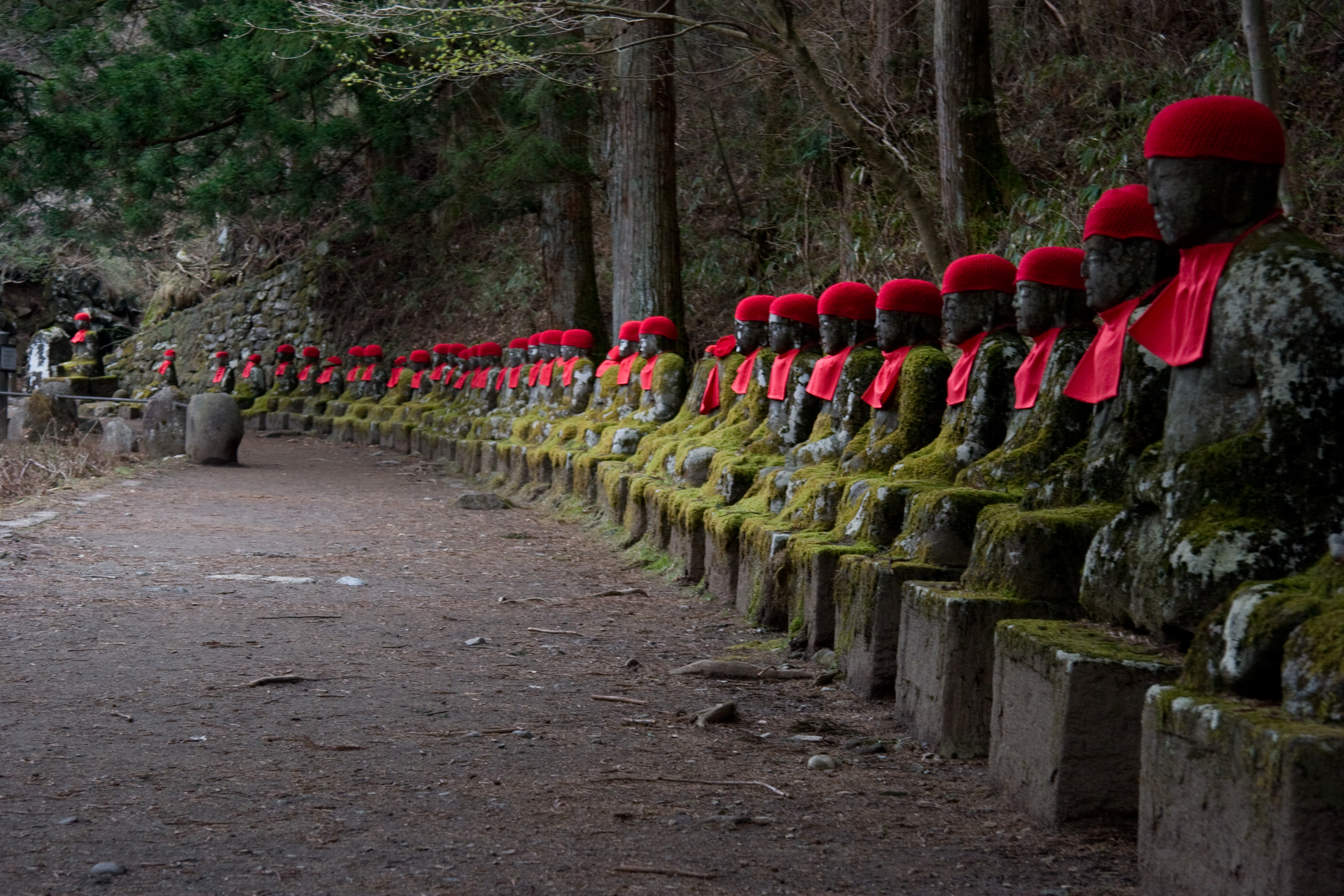
Kanmangafuchi Abyss in Nikkō, a popular trail near the hotel where Véron was last seen.

In July 2020, the Éric Dupond-Moretti law firm took over the case, aiming to identify the most effective legal mechanisms for further action in Japan.

A French investigating judge was appointed in Poitiers, and the case remains open under charges of "abduction and unlawful confinement", the theory favored by the family.

In late 2020, the family hired Jean-François Abgrall, a private investigator known for helping capture serial killer Francis Heaulme.

Damien Véron traveled to Japan in December 2022 to meet local police and compare Véron's case to other unresolved incidents.

In early 2024, lawyer Corinne Herrmann and judge Sabine Kheris of the French cold case unit planned a visit to Nikkō.

In January 2024 (as part of the fourth formal request by the UN Committee on Enforced Disappearances), Japan was urged again to enhance cooperation with French authorities and resume the investigation into Véron's disappearance.

On 29 July 2024, Damien Véron issued an international appeal for witnesses, asking travelers present in Nikkō at the time to share their photos from that day.

In June 2025, Cécile Juan, a filmmaker and Véron's childhood friend who had accompanied the family during the first search efforts in 2018, released a documentary titled L'air mouillé, which covers the second three-and-a-half-week trip undertaken in 2021 by Véron's brother and sister.

In July 2025, Damien Véron traveled to Japan for the eighth time to renew an international appeal for witnesses, this time targeting Japanese-speaking audiences, and to press Japanese authorities to open a criminal investigation rather than maintain the prevailing accident hypothesis. Later that month, a new development in the case was disclosed, suggesting that, based on data obtained from geolocation of Véron's phone data, she had remained in her hotel room until 11:40 a.m. on 29 July, contradicting the hotel owner's testimony, who had previously stated that he saw Véron leave the premises at 10 a.m.

== See also ==
- Voluntary disappearance (jōhatsu)
