= Dogra Magra =

1935 novel by Yumeno Kyusaku

- Author: Yumeno Kyusaku
- Original title: ドグラ・マグラ
- Language: Japanese
- Genre: Detective fiction
- Publisher: Shohakukan Shoten
- Publication date: January 1935
- Publication place: Japan

Dogra Magra (ドグラ・マグラ, Dogura Magura) is a novel considered the masterpiece of mystery writer Yumeno Kyusaku. Published in 1935 after more than 10 years of planning and writing, it is noted as one of Japan's "three strange mysterious novels", alongside Oguri Mushitaro's The Black Death Mansion Murders and Nakai Hideo's An Offering to Nothingness. It formed the basis of a 1988 film of the same name.

In the story, the original meaning of "Dogura Magura" is explained as a dialect of the Nagasaki region, referring to the magic of Christians, priests, or as a corrupted version of "confused, taken aback" or "dōmawari, mekurami," but the details are unclear. Before this work, it was used as ruby for phantom magic and illusion in Dr. Inugami. Additionally, a woman from Saga prefecture testified that she knew that Dogura Magura was actually used as a child.

== Overview ==
Dogra Magra was published as a newly written work by Shohakukan Shoten in January 1935 (Showa 10), with the tagline "A mysterious and mysterious detective novel." In 1926, the year he made his debut as a writer, Yumeno Kyusaku began writing a novel about the mentally ill, Madman's Release Treatment. This would later become Dogura Magura, after he spent nearly 10 years thoroughly revising it. Yumeno died the year after it was published.

The story (or so it seems) is about a young, amnesiac mental patient who is locked in a cell in the Department of Psychiatry at Kyushu University's School of Medicine in 1926 (Taisho 15), and is told by him in the first person. He has some kind of connection to several incidents that occurred in the past, and as the story progresses, a culprit, motive, and modus operandi of a mysterious series of incidents are gradually revealed.

At first glance, it appears to follow the established formula of existing detective fiction, and so for convenience is often classified as a "detective novel", but insofar as it deviates from the mould has become exemplary of an "anti-mystery". The murder itself is rather simple, but the structure is complex, with a nested structure of academic papers such as "The Dream of a Fetus" (based on Ernst Haeckel's theory of repetition), a grandiose treatise about the billion-year long evolutionary nightmare that a fetus experiences during the 10 months it is developing inside the womb, "The Brain Theory," which claims that "the brain is not the place for thinking," and "The Hellish Prayer of the Crazy One," which describes the horror of mental hospitals where you cannot leave until you die. There are also metafictional elements in the work, such as the appearance of a book called "Dogura Magura," which "is so complex that the reader is forced to reread it at least twice." The culprit and the truth are never revealed, and the logical solution that is naturally found in detective novels and mysteries is foreclosed.

It is said that it is difficult to understand the truth and content of the work in one reading, but many readers give up midway due to its complex, insane, and difficult content and structure. It is also often said that "Anyone who reads this book from start to finish will definitely become mentally unstable at least once." In a conversation with Kobayashi Nobuhiko in 1977, Yokomizo Seishi said that he reread it for the conversation and became so upset that he went crazy in the middle of the night, and his wife, who was also there, agreed.

== Adaptations ==
Dogra Magra
- ドグラ・マグラ
- Directed by: Toshio Matsumoto
- Starring: Shijaku Katsura II, Hideo Murota, Yoji Matsuda
- Production company: Katsujindo Cinema
- Release date: 15 October 1988
- Running time: 109 minutes
- Country: Japan
- Language: Japanese

An adaptation of the novel, directed by Toshio Matsumoto, was released in October 1988.

- Dogura Magura
- Genre: Detective novel
- Manga
- Written by: Yumeno Kyusaku
- Illustrated by: Variety Artworks
- Published by: East Press
- Published: 2008
- Volumes: 1
- Original video animation
- Directed by: Kishi Kaisei
- Written by: Kishi Kaisei
- Music by: Senda Kazuhiro
- Studio: T.O Entertainment
- Released: 21 December 2012
- Runtime: 66 minutes

In 2008, a manga adaptation was released. An animated adaptation of the manga was released in 2012.
