= For My Crushed Right Eye =

- Directed by: Toshio Matsumoto
- Written by: Toshio Matsumoto
- Produced by: Mitsuru Kudo; Keiko Machida
- Cinematography: Tatsuo Suzuki
- Distributed by: Art Theatre Guild
- Release date: 1968
- Running time: 15 minutes
- Country: Japan
- Language: Japanese

For My Crushed Right Eye (Japanese: つぶれかかった右眼のために, Hepburn: Tsuburekakatta migime no tame ni) (also known as For the Damaged Right Eye) is a 1968 Japanese short film by Toshio Matsumoto.

It features some of the same milieu of Matsumoto's 1969 feature film Funeral Parade of Roses, presented through three projectors running simultaneously. Since projectors may run at slightly different speeds, the images can go "out of sync," and each projection of the film can be different.
