= Shinsuke Ogawa =

Japanese documentary filmmaker (1935–1992)

Shinsuke Ogawa (小川紳介, Ogawa Shinsuke) (25 June 1935 – 7 February 1992) was a Japanese documentary film director. Ogawa and Noriaki Tsuchimoto have been called the "two figures [that] tower over the landscape of Japanese documentary."

== Career ==
Ogawa began his career at Iwanami Productions (Iwanami Eiga) making PR (public relations) films alongside other important directors such as Tsuchimoto, Kazuo Kuroki, Yōichi Higashi, and Susumu Hani. Turning independent, he first made documentaries about radical political movements in 1960s and 1970s Japan, most famously the "Sanrizuka" or "Narita" series, which recorded the struggle by farmers and student protesters to prevent the construction of the Narita International Airport in Sanrizuka, Chiba Prefecture. He won the Directors Guild of Japan New Directors Award for Summer in Narita in 1970. Ogawa's was a committed form of documentary, which clearly took the side of those combatting unjust power. A growing sense that he did not understand the life of the farmers he was filming, however, led Ogawa and his crew, collectively called Ogawa Productions, to leave for Magino in Yamagata Prefecture where they spent decades filming the life and histories of everyday farmers while living with them and pursuing agriculture. He often worked with the cinematographer Masaki Tamura. The "Magino" films became the epitome of Ogawa's stance towards documentary: that one can only record a reality that one has been truly immersed in. Ogawa was influential in the creation of the Yamagata International Documentary Film Festival, where the top prize in the Asia program was named after him. The film Devotion by Barbara Hammer is about Ogawa Productions.

== Filmography ==
- A Sea of Youth (青年の海 Seinen no umi) (1966)
- The Oppressed Students (圧殺の森 高崎経済大学闘争の記録 Assatsu no mori: Takasaki Keizai Daigaku toso no kiroku) (1967)
- Summer in Narita (日本解放戦線 三里塚の夏 Nihon Kaiho sensen: Sanrizuka no natsu) (1968)
- Narita: The Peasants of the Second Fortress (三里塚 第二砦の人々 Sanrizuka: Dainitoride no hitobito) (1971)
- Heta Village (三里塚 辺田部落 Sanrizuka: Heta buraku) (1973)
- A Japanese Village - Furuyashikimura (ニッポン国 古屋敷村 Nipponkoku Furuyashikimura) (1982)
- Magino Village: A Tale (1000年刻みの日時計 牧野村物語 1000-nen kizami no hidokei: Maginomura monogatari) (1987)
- Red Persimmons (満山紅柿 上山 － 柿と人とのゆきかい Manzan Benigaki) (2001)
