= Jōhatsu =

People in Japan who purposely vanish from their lives

Jōhatsu (Japanese: 蒸発, Hepburn: jōhatsu; lit. "evaporation") or jouhatsu refers to the people in Japan who purposely vanish from their established lives without a trace. This phenomenon can be seen all over the world, such as the United States, Canada, China, South Korea, the United Kingdom, and Germany.

The phenomenon of jōhatsu in Japan has often been described in an exaggerated manner. In reality, the vast majority of missing persons are located. Of approximately 80,000 missing persons reports filed annually, about half are resolved on the same day of reporting, around 75% are resolved within two to three days, and approximately 85% are resolved within one week. While about 25% of missing persons cases are attributed to dementia, the leading cause of disappearance is illness, followed by family-related circumstances, and then work-related factors.

== Background ==
It has been theorized that Japan's harsh work culture in combination with the lack of familial and community support has contributed to the prevalence of jōhatsu in Japan. Furthermore, quitting a company is seen as shameful in Japanese culture. Suicide, working to death (karoshi), and becoming jōhatsu are thus potential outcomes. It can also spare the family the high costs that can be associated with suicide (e.g. debts, cleanup fees, and disruption-of-service fees in the context of platform jumpers).

Similar societal pressures have been theorized to contribute to the prevalence of hikikomori and a relatively high suicide rate.

== History ==
The term jōhatsu started being used in the 1960s. At that time, it was used in the context of people who decided to escape unhappy marriages rather than endure formal divorce proceedings. The Lost Decade of the 1990s led to a spike in jōhatsu and suicide as many salarymen lost their jobs or accumulated debt.

== Prevalence ==
In Japan, the topic of jōhatsu is taboo in regular conversation, like the topic of suicide. It has been estimated that 100,000 Japanese people disappear annually. However, jōhatsu may be underreported in the official numbers. In 2015, Japan's National Police Agency had registered 82,000 missing persons, and 80,000 were found by the end of the year. In comparison, that same year, Britain had 300,000 calls to report a missing person, although it has about half of the population of Japan. Furthermore, a database of missing persons does not exist in Japan.

The Missing Persons Search Support Association of Japan, a non-profit dedicated to support families of the jōhatsu, estimates hundreds of thousands of people go missing each year.

== Motivation ==
People become jōhatsu for a number of reasons, including depression, addiction, sexual impropriety, and desire for isolation. Sometimes, it is used to escape domestic violence, gambling debt, religious cults, stalkers, employers, and difficult family situations. The shame of job loss, divorce, and even failing an exam can also motivate people to disappear.

In some cases, becoming jōhatsu is a way to just have a fresh start. When they disappear, they can abandon their former residences, jobs, families, names, and even appearances.

== Industry ==
The businesses that assist the jōhatsu are called yonige-ya (夜逃げ屋, midnight escape agents). These establishments are relatively accessible and have their own websites. One particular yonige-ya could charge between ¥50,000 ($450) and ¥300,000 ($2,600) for its services, which depend on a number of factors. These factors include: the amount of possessions, the distance, if it is a nocturnal move, if children are included, and if the client is evading debt collectors. Sometimes, people disappear on their own without the aid of yonige-ya. There are published guides that can help assist people become jōhatsu.

Detective agencies are sometimes used to find people who have become jōhatsu. Sometimes, people can be found spending time at pachinko parlors and cheap hotel rooms, and other times, they can be found to have died by suicide. San'ya, a skid row in Tokyo that previously housed thousands of day laborers, is reported to be a place of hiding for the jōhatsu. Kamagasaki in Osaka is another neighborhood where it is possible to live without an ID, and so is also favored.

These communities are yakuza strongholds, since they have jobs that pay in cash. Often, especially in the setting of Japan's strict privacy laws, the jōhatsu are unable to be found. Most jōhatsu court cases are civil cases, and personal data is not easily accessed. Police will not interfere unless there is a crime or accident.

== Media ==
The 2024 documentary Johatsu by German director Andreas Hartmann and Arata Mori interviews people involved in the phenomenon, as well as the related yonige-ya services.

== Criticism ==
The Monocle magazine pointed out that the concept of jōhatsu is relatively outdated. In today's Japan, it is no longer a widely recognized social problem and is not a familiar phenomenon, rather than "refusing to discuss it because the Japanese regard it as a taboo". Although many media outlets quote "100,000 people go missing in Japan every year" when talking about this concept, there has been a significant decline since 2000, and most of them have been found. The enthusiasm of the English media may be an imagination of Japan's "exotic otherness".

== See also ==
- Hikikomori – Reclusive adolescents or adults
- A Man Vanishes
- Missing person – Person who has disappeared and whose status as alive or dead cannot be confirmed
- Toyoko kids, a more modern phenomenon
