= Funeral Parade of Roses =

1969 Japanese film by Toshio Matsumoto

- Japanese film poster
- Directed by: Toshio Matsumoto
- Written by: Toshio Matsumoto
- Produced by: Mitsuru Kudo; Keiko Machida
- Starring: Peter; Osamu Ogasawara; Yoshio Tsuchiya; Emiko Azuma
- Cinematography: Tatsuo Suzuki
- Edited by: Toshie Iwasa
- Music by: Joji Yuasa
- Production company: Matsumoto Productions
- Distributed by: Art Theatre Guild
- Release date: 13 September 1969
- Running time: 105 minutes
- Country: Japan
- Language: Japanese

Funeral Parade of Roses (薔薇の葬列, Bara no Sōretsu) is a 1969 Japanese experimental film written and directed by Toshio Matsumoto. It is a loose adaptation of the Greek tragedy Oedipus Rex, set in the underground gay culture of 1960s Tokyo. Considered part of the Angura film movement, it combines elements of arthouse, documentary, and experimental filmmaking. The film centers 'gay-boy' Eddie, a young transgender woman working at a gay bar in Tokyo played by well-known Japanese gay entertainer Peter. The plot follows Eddie as she engages in a sexual relationship with the bar's owner, who promotes her as the lead girl of the establishment. According to Matsumoto, Funeral Parade of Roses is "in a way a film about filmmaking" and "a film about boundaries".

Funeral Parade of Roses originates from the Japanese New Wave film movement, and is considered a monumental work of queer cinema. The film was released by ATG (Art Theatre Guild) on 13 September 1969 in Japan, but it did not receive a United States release until 29 October 1970. In June 2017, it received a 4K restoration and a limited theatrical re-release.

== Plot ==
Funeral Parade of Roses revolves around the underground culture and queer community in Tokyo. The main narrative follows Eddie and other gei boi performers at the host club bar Genet. Interspersed throughout the narrative are flashbacks, intertitles, and interviews. Funeral Parade is presented as a nonlinear narrative. The following plot summary gives an account of the film broadly according to the events shown on screen.

Eddie and Gonda have sex in Gonda's apartment. Eddie works as a transgender bar hostess at the Genet, a gay bar in Tokyo that employs several gei boi to host customers. The Genet is managed by the drug dealer Gonda, who lives together with Leda, the current madame or "lead girl" of the bar. Eddie and Gonda leave the apartment together, Leda spies them from a street corner. Eddie sees Leda when Gonda drives past the street corner; Gonda promises to make Eddie the new madame of the bar.

A group of gei boi and underground filmmakers are seen kicking an inflatable seat on a street in Tokyo, while Guevara, a member of the collective, watches them. Eddie takes a shower but arrives late to work. She gets drunk and dances with Tony, an American soldier. As they walk through the streets they are passed by student protesters; the two take a taxi together and have sex. The underground filmmaking collective films the news footage shown on the television while using a magnetic coil to distort the image. The group finish filming and abuse eye drops for a hallucinogenic high.

Eddie watches a performing arts group enact a funeral procession. Wandering the streets of Tokyo, she enters an art exhibit to avoid men trying to pick her up. In the exhibit a voice on a tape recorder speaks about individuals masking their personalities, Eddie passes out in the art museum. While at work on a different night, the police arrive, Eddie warns Gonda and he hides his drug dealing operation. Eddie goes shopping with friends, visiting clothing stores and a hair salon, eating ice cream and entering a men's bathroom. Leda and Gonda fight about Eddie, with Gonda saying that he would rather fire Leda than Eddie. After viewing one of Guevara's films, Eddie and the other members of the collective smoke marijuana and dance. For her evening debut as the bar's madame, Eddie grooms herself. Leda confronts Eddie in the bar about her relationship with Gonda and the two of them fight.

In a series of flashbacks we see Eddie's relationship with her mother. Some time before she became a hostess Eddie's mother reminisces about Eddie's absent father. Eddie tells her that she will always be there, to which her mother laughs. At another point, Eddie tries on her mother's makeup; when her mother discovers Eddie kissing her reflection in the mirror, she beats Eddie. Later, Eddie's mother brings another man home. Eddie follows them upstairs and stabs them both with a knife. Guevara and Eddie grow closer to each other and, after a while, have sex.

Eddie prepares for work but encounters an injured student protestor as she leaves, she spends time healing him, causing her to be late. While out with two friends, Eddie and her friends are confronted by a trio of women, and a fight ensues. Gonda visits Leda and is angered when she feigns concern for Eddie's well-being, he fires and breaks up with her. Leda is later found lying in her bed, having died by suicide, wearing a veil and surrounded by roses. After Leda's funeral, Eddie is promoted to madame of the Genet. That night she and Gonda have sex while elsewhere Guevara dances. Eddie takes a shower, during which Gonda finds a photograph of Eddie as a child with her parents. Gonda recognises Eddie's mother as his former lover. Realising that Eddie is his child, Gonda kills himself with a knife. Upon seeing this, Eddie takes the knife and stabs herself in each eye, before stumbling outside in front of a crowd of people.

== Cast ==
- Peter as Eddie
- Osamu Ogasawara as Leda
- Yoshio Tsuchiya as Gonda
- Emiko Azuma as Eddie's mother
- Toyosaburo Uchiyama as Guevara
- Don Madrid as Tony
- Koichi Nakamura as Juju
- Chieko Kobayashi as Okei
- Shōtarō Akiyama as himself
- Kiyoshi Awazu as himself

== Production ==
=== Development ===
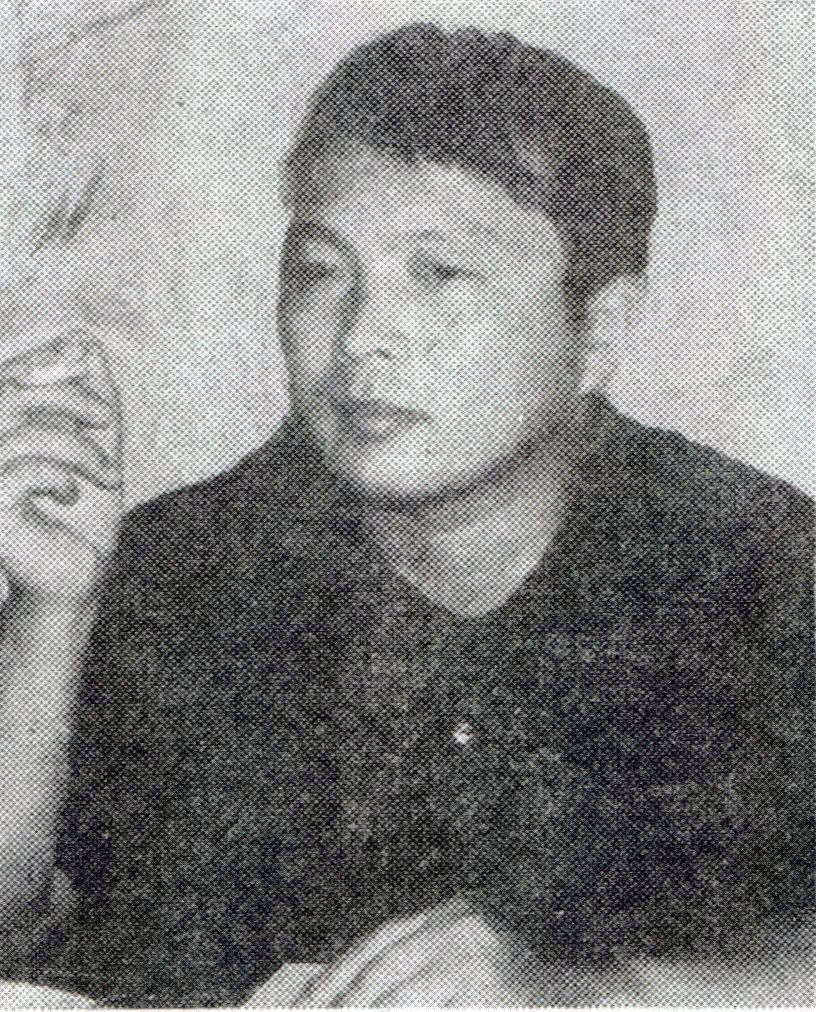
Director Toshio Matsumoto in 1967

Toshio Matsumoto worked as a director and film theorist through the 1950s. In 1958, he published a manifesto calling for a new method of filmmaking that he termed 'neo-documentarism'. The method merged the styles of documentary film and the avant-garde to portray both an external and psychic realism that emphasised the cinematic form as well as the political realities that were depicted. This form of realism was theorised by Matsumoto as a reaction against films that subordinated the artist's subjectivity to a hidden ideology. The documentary approach to reality and the avant-garde emphasis on subjectivity would provide a dialectical synthesis that could see each method draw out the strengths of the other in creating a 'new realism'. Matsumoto made short films in this style before making Funeral Parade of Roses, his first feature film, as a practice of his theory.

At the time Matsumoto was developing Funeral Parade, angura—or, underground—culture, the films of the Japanese New Wave, and the radical student movement were informing contemporary changes in aesthetic and political realities. Matsumoto himself was inspired by the French New Wave and American underground cinema, including the films of Luis Buñuel, Jack Smith's Flaming Creatures (1963) and Kenneth Anger's Scorpio Rising (1963). Funeral Parade of Roses is loosely based on the myth of Oedipus and takes visual elements from Alain Resnais's film Hiroshima mon amour (1959). The literary critic and scholar Kitamura Sae also indicates that Matsumoto was inspired by the story of "Snow White" and Shūji Terayama's play "Marie in Furs". Funeral Parade's script was written prior to the creation of Matsumoto's film For the Damaged Right Eye (1968), which was made just before the events of May 68.

In order to secure funds to make the film, Matsumoto took out a loan to finance the production of Funeral Parade. As part of his efforts to raise money, he participated in the 1970 Osaka World Exposition, which was boycotted by many radical artists as they saw it as a distraction from the 1970 Anpo protests and as a representation of the excesses of consumer culture. Matsumoto chose to work outside film production companies so that he could more accurately execute on his original ideas and intentions for the film. He partnered with the Art Theatre Guild (ATG), which not only co-financed independent features, but also acted as distributor. The ATG produced one film at a time and gave production budgets of ¥10 million (about one fifth of the average studio production budget). (Note: Equivalent to ¥37.7 million in 2024)

=== Casting ===
Matsumoto hired non-professional actors to play roles in the film, often from the gay community of Tokyo. The avant-garde performance group Zero Jigen and various media personalities were also hired to play themselves, including the film critic Nagaharu Yodogawa, who ends the film by imitating his own television programme. On one occasion, Matsumoto thought of the idea of using naked men with their backs to the camera. He spontaneously asked a production assistant to go to Shinjuku Station on the same day to ask people if they wanted to be in the film. Peter, who was sixteen years old at the time, was scouted to play the role of Eddie at a gay bar where he worked part-time. Prior to working on Funeral Parade, he had never cross-dressed. Matsumoto had already seen over 100 candidates (via photos or auditions) for the role of Eddie, but considered Peter to be a perfect fit for the role after he went to the bar with the film's art director and cinematographer, Tatsuo Suzuki. Peter reflected on his performance in 2017 as being precisely acted according to Matsumoto's direction.

=== Production and post-production ===
The film was set and shot in Tokyo, particularly in the Shinjuku area. Although a script was used, much of the film was improvised in order to heighten the sense of realism and dramatic interest. Given the film's low budget, there was a rush to shoot as much film as possible. The opening of Funeral Parade was shot at a location behind the Shinjuku Koma Theater. The crew shot some footage using guerilla-style filmmaking as they could not receive permission to film in Shinjuku. This entailed creating an escape plan in case police were present by deciding which staff members would allow police to catch them to ensure the others could get away.

The film's cinematography makes use of extreme close-ups to create a dynamic affect, and mirrors that establish a bilateral symmetrical image to blur the line between reality and reflection. Matsumoto incorporated his first video artwork Magnetic Scramble into Funeral Parade, which showed television images of student protesters distorted with a magnetic coil. During filming on set, the photographer Daidō Moriyama took a series of photographs on 5 January 1969; later in the year he used the filmmakers' technique of scrambling the television set for his photo series Accident published in Asahi Camera.

When asked in a 2014 interview about the construction and editing processes of Funeral Parade of Roses, Matsumoto responded:

Funeral Parade of Roses is a film about boundaries. Boundaries are relative to the spectator’s perspective, [...] The obvious example of this is that of the “gay boys” themselves. [...] But in Funeral Parade of Roses I dealt with the additional issue of the deconstruction, and reconstruction of the order of time, [...] time in Funeral Parade of Roses is suddenly, and objectively deconstructed, reconstructed, and connected even without a motivating character; in other words, the time objectively distorts itself, instead of relating back to the past through someone’s subjective point of view.

The film is edited together using rapid intercutting between its narrative, abstract images, and non-fictional content. The film makes heavy use of references and intertextuality, including a segment taken from Matsumoto's short film Extasis (1969). Graphic designs referencing comics, as well as direct quotations from Charles Baudelaire's poem collection, the Les Fleurs du mal, and the films of Alain Renais and Charlie Chaplin. During a scene where Eddie faints in an art museum, the drawings on the wall are taken from an unrealised art project by Tatsuo Ikeda. The film's composer was Joji Yuasa, and Sadao Miyazaki was its hairstylist.

== Themes ==
=== Queerness and politics ===
Funeral Parade of Roses provides a radical critique of the mainstream culture. According to the film scholar David Desser, the characters exist in a state of "ambivalence" which forms the basis of sexual attraction while also being a political category. The film's director Matsumoto identified the masks as a motif (including makeup, facial transformations, and the art gallery exhibition) associated with the gei boi community which uses masks as a form of concealment and disguise. To him, the gei boi actors themselves reflect a blurring of the boundary between male and female. While Matsumoto intended to film a male homosexual subculture, the subjects of his documentary display a diverse range of genders and sexualities. The scholar of contemporary art Taro Nettleton characterises the film's representation of queerness as non-pathological and normalising, without the queer characters symbolising contemporary sociopolitical divides. He sees the characters as rejecting a defined political cause in favour of a belief in potentiality, or 'becoming'.

The film ties Eddie's subjectivity to human and city landscapes by the way it opens, framed via intimate acts and between receding building in the car's rearview mirror. Peter's screen presence as Eddie reveals a kind of metamorphosis into a vision of femininity. Felicity Gee writes that Eddie embodies a "polymorphous identity" by inverting the structure of the Oedipus complex. Eddie starts as a son who kills their mother before becoming the daughter who sleeps with her father and blinding herself as the character Oedipus did. According to Gee, Peter's performance of femininity in the film embodies the notion of an angura diva, whose presence demonstrates both the current social moment and "modernist theories of photodynamism". She continues, writing that Eddie embodies "a nascent postmodernity" as their primary influences are not those of their parents, but their peer group's rejection of mainstream culture and mimicry of a commercialised image of femininity. The new reality represented by Eddie and her counter-cultural position is itself anti-establishment.

The relationship between Leda and Eddie has been viewed as a conflict between the young and the old, with analyses contrasting their clothes. Kitamura Sae contrasts Leda's identification with kabuki and kimono and Eddie's with modern dance and minidresses as examples of the changing patterns of femininity and broader culture. She compares their relationship with that between the title character and evil queen in the fairytale "Snow White". Citing the scene of Leda asking who is the most beautiful into the mirror, Kitamura positions Eddie as Snow White herself in how she represents a threat to Leda. According to Kitamura, Matsumoto identifies the gei boi with the artist. As such she reads the film's conclusion of Leda's death and Eddie's blinding as the result of a destructive artistic culture that is constantly being revolutionised. The academic Ferran de Vargas compares the ending of Funeral Parade to other Japanese New Wave films and considers its self-destructive ending to be an ideological commitment to 'self-denial', a belief held by members of the Japanese New Left that centred prioritising self-criticism of their own legitimacy within power structures.

=== Style and form ===
The visual style of the film is marked by frequent breaks in the fourth wall which focus on the nature of cinematic production itself. The form has been described by the film theorist Noël Burch as Brechtian, with a dialectical method that resolves a tension between "Japanese culture and Western material theories of representation". Funeral Parade's depiction of non-normative sexualities and spaces via the queer scene in Shinjuku is explored using dense formal cinematic techniques and a non-linear depiction of time. Matsumoto—in attempting to de- and re-construct a visual language of time—considered temporal distortion to function objectively, outside of any one character's recollection, with the film's structure reflecting the unconscious mind.

Gee analyses the first-person perspective of the camera lens and Eddie's constant bodily movement as aspects of a gaze that "is not entirely fixed", embodying both male and female gazes.

Professor of cinema Yuriko Furuhata writes that Funeral Parade appropriates and re-visualises through other media the content and style of journalism to comment on the way journalism is itself theatrically constructed, which she refers to as "artifactuality". Comparing the film to Nagisa Ōshima's film Diary of a Shinjuku Thief (1969), she refers to both films as an attempt to confront the sensational effect and visual language of television.

== Release ==
=== Theatrical ===
Funeral Parade of Roses opened at the Art Theatre Shinjuku Bunka on 13 September 1969 with a runtime of 104 minutes. The film was later screened in West German cinemas in 1970. Funeral Parade was shown in the United States at the San Francisco International Film Festival on 29 October 1970. On 7 June 1973 it received a limited release in New York, opening for six days at the First Avenue Screening Room. The New York release had a runtime of 95 minutes. In June 2017, the film was re-released theatrically in the United States.

=== Home media ===
The film was released in the United Kingdom on DVD by Eureka in 2006, which included an interview with the director, Toshio Matsumoto. In 2020 the British Film Institute released the film on Blu-ray. The film received a Blu-ray release in America via Cinelicious in 2017. The transfer uses mono audio; and the release includes a commentary track by the creative Chris D., eight of Matsumoto's short films from 1961–1975, and a companion booklet containing an essay about the director and the films included in the release.

== Reception ==
=== Contemporary opinion ===
Upon its release in Japan, Funeral Parade of Roses was criticised for not being overtly political. Viewers were surprised at the film's subject matter, unfamiliar with the use of private sexuality to express public political sentiments. Matsumoto considered the worst criticism he received to concern the film's structure; he was attacked for putting shots "in the wrong order", which was attributed to his inexperience with creating narrative films. When the film was shown at San Francisco in 1970, the audience groaned when it was revealed that Gonda is Eddie's father. Variety magazine panned the film, believing there was "nothing creative" about it, and that it did not have enough sex to be an effective sexploitation film. In 1973, Vincent Canby for The New York Times wrote that the film was overly-sentimental and melodramatic; despite depicting Tokyo's underworld, he considered the portrayal "comfortably middle-class".

=== Retrospective opinion ===
On the review aggregator website Rotten Tomatoes, 100% of 22 critics' reviews are positive, with an average rating of 8.5/10.

Writing for Sight and Sound in 2006, the film critic Geoffrey Macnab considered the film inventive and well-shot, but wrote that "it is uneven and, at times, awkwardly self-conscious".

J. Hoberman, writing for The New York Times in 2017, compared Peter to the Warhol Factory actresses Candy Darling and Holly Woodlawn. He believed the film to be charming but dated.

In 2017, IndieWire's Michael Nordine gave the film a grade of "A−", calling it "very much a trip, the kind you might not be able to make sense of at every step of the way but later, after returning to reality, will be glad to have embarked on." That same year, Simon Abrams of RogerEbert.com gave the film a score of four out of four stars, concluding: "You may not directly identify with Eddie or his [sic] world, but you will walk away from Matsumoto's film with a newfound appreciation of what movies can be." In 2020, Peter Bradshaw of The Guardian gave the film five out of five stars, calling it "a fusillade of haunted images and traumatised glimpses, splattered across a realist melodrama of the Tokyo underground club scene, played out in a fiercely beautiful monochrome", as well as "a jagged shard of a film, an underground dream of longing and despair, an excursion away from narrative and a great example of the Japanese New Wave [...]".

In Corpses, Fools, and Monsters: The History and Future of Transness in Cinema, authors Caden Mark Gardner and Willow Catelyn Maclay depict the film as a revolutionary moment in trans cinema. They describe it as "an incredibly exciting, refreshing, unforgettable film that is a record of its time and place, and that shows the radical potential of the trans film image, serving as metaphor, provocation, and object of desire all at once." It both played with and subverted "transploitation" films of its era.

== Legacy ==
Funeral Parade of Roses is considered a landmark of queer cinema and of the Japanese New Wave film movement in the English-speaking world. According to film critic Jasper Sharp, Funeral Parade of Roses was the first film to acknowledge Japan's gay subculture. The Japanese queer magazine Barazoku was named after the film.
