= On the Road: A Document =

- Directed by: Noriaki Tsuchimoto
- Written by: Tokuo Kusunoki
- Produced by: Masami Makino; Kiyoshi Kurahashi; Takashi Marumo
- Starring: Kimio Kawasaki; Eiko Minami
- Cinematography: Tatsuo Suzuki
- Edited by: Eiko Minami
- Music by: Minoru Miki
- Production company: Toyo Cinema
- Release date: 1964
- Running time: 54 minutes
- Country: Japan
- Language: Japanese

On the Road: A Document (Japanese: ドキュメント 路上, Hepburn: Dokyumento rojō) is a 1964 Japanese documentary film directed by Noriaki Tsuchimoto.

== Scenario ==
The film focuses on the taxi drivers of Tokyo in the year before the 1964 Tokyo Olympics and the difficulties they face: construction obstructing traffic, poor working conditions, numerous accidents, and bad pay. It becomes a critique of a changing and modernizing urban Japan.

== Production ==
The film was originally commissioned by the Tokyo Metropolitan Police Department and the National Police Agency as a traffic safety documentary. Tsuchimoto's proposal had won the competition for the project, but he ended up changing the film after cooperating with a cab driver's union which was protesting work conditions. The film was partially scripted and amateur actors played the main roles. The resulting film offended the TMPD, which refused to use it.

== Reception ==
Film critic Chris Fujiwara, reviewing the DVD, called On the Road: A Document "a breakthrough film... Constantly imaginative and vigorous in depicting movement but never fetishising it in a facile or celebratory way, On the Road has the working-class speed and grimness of an early-1930s Warner Bros film, at the same time reshaping stray observational surprises in the manner of Beat poetry."

== Accolades ==
The film won several foreign and domestic awards in 1964.
