= Hideo Kanze =

Japanese actor (1927–2007)

Hideo Kanze (観世 栄夫, Kanze Hideo; August 3, 1927 – June 8, 2007) was a Japanese actor and director, who specialized in the Noh form of musical drama.

He was the second son of Kanze Tetsunojō VII, a descendant of Kan'ami and Zeami, who founded the Noh movement in the 14th century. Trained alongside his brothers by his father and grandfather, Kanze made his Noh stage debut at the age of three. After World War II ended, Kanze attended the Tokyo Music School, although he dropped out before completing his studies. With his family running one of Japan's five main Noh schools, Kanze was controversially adopted by another school, the Kita group, for 11 years.

His activities caused an uproar in the Noh community, and he quit the movement, acting in conventional drama and films. With the help of his older brother, Hisao Kanze, also an actor, Hideo resumed his career in Noh in 1979.

On May 2, 2007, Kanze was involved in a serious car accident when his car crashed into the median strip on the Chūō Expressway in Tokyo. An elderly female passenger, believed to be a colleague, suffered serious head injuries and died in hospital.

Kanze died just over a month after the accident from intestinal cancer, aged 79.

== Filmography ==
- Ningen (1962) as Kompira
- Pitfall (1962)
- Lost Sex (1966)
- Demons (1971)
- Summer Soldiers (1972)
- Nichiren (1979)
- Wangan Doro (1984)
