= Art Theatre Guild =

Japanese film company

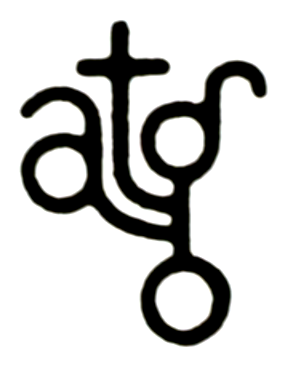
- Type: Film production, film distribution
- Industry: Film studio
- Founded: 1961
- Headquarters: Japan

The Art Theatre Guild (ATG) was a Japanese film production and distribution company which started in 1961, releasing mostly Japanese New Wave and art films. The programming was complemented by a print magazine called Art Theatre containing articles, summaries, and film criticism. From the late 1960s to the mid 1980s, it also often acted as producer. In 2018, ATG merged with its parent company Toho.

== History ==
ATG began as a distributor for foreign art films in Japan, with the Toho studio being its main financier and one of its initiators. By 1967, ATG was assisting with production costs for a number of new Japanese films. Some of the early films released by ATG include Shōhei Imamura's A Man Vanishes (1967), Nagisa Oshima's Diary Of A Shinjuku Thief (1968) and Death by Hanging (1968), Toshio Matsumoto's Funeral Parade of Roses (1969), and Akio Jissoji's Mujō (1970).

== See also ==
- Art Theatre Guild filmography
