= Kunio Shimizu =

Japanese playwright (1936–2021)

- 清水 邦夫
- Born: November 17, 1936; Niigata, Japan
- Died: April 15, 2021 (aged 84); Tokyo, Japan
- Education: Waseda University
- Occupations: Theatre director, film director, actor
- Years active: 1958–2021
- Spouse: Matsumoto Noriko

Kunio Shimizu (清水 邦夫, Shimizu Kunio) (17 November 1936 – 15 April 2021) was a Japanese playwright. Niigata is his hometown, which is located on the Japan Sea. At Tama University of Fine Arts Shimizu was a professor working in the Moving Images and Performing Arts Department.

== Life ==
Shimizu Kunio grew up in Niigata Prefecture. His father was a policeman. As a student at Waseda University located in Tokyo Shimizu wrote The Signatory in 1958 as well as Tomorrow I'll Put Flowers There in 1959. These plays were produced in the year 1960 by Seihai, a professional theatre company. After he finished studying at Waseda University Shimizu worked at Iwanami Productions, which is a Tokyo firm. There he wrote scenarios for documentaries as well as public relations films. In 1965 he went on to be an independent playwright and left the company. Somewhere around 1968 Yukio Ninagawa asked Shimizu to write a play for him to direct. At the time, Ninagawa was an actor for Seihai. Shimizu wrote Such a Serious Frivolity for Ninagawa to produce, however, even though Ninagawa wanted to produce the play the script got rejected. Due to this incident Ninagawa and some other people who worked with him left Seihai. They made a new company that was called the Modern People's Theater. Around this time there was a lot of social disruption. Young people across Japan from what was called the New Left started political argumentative meetings. Therefore, Shimizu wrote some plays in order to bring up a sense of the view of the people whose political reform demands were not being met. Shimizu Kunio married Matsumoto Noriko who was an actress. Together they founded a group of entertainers called the Winter Tree Company (Mokutōsha). He also set up the Modern Man's Theater (Gendaijin gekijō) along with Ninagawa.

== Plays ==
The plays he wrote include The Dressing Room (Gakuya), Such a Serious Frivolity (Shinjō afururu keihakusa), Tango at the End of Winter (Tango fugu no owari ni), When We Go Down That Great Unfeeling River (Bokura ga hijō no taiga o kudaru toki), and An Older Sister, Burning Like a Flame (Hi no yō ni samishii ane ga ita). Shimizu Kunio went to Waseda University and started writing plays to be performed in the 1960s. His play When We Go Down That Great Unfeeling River (Bokura ga hijō no taiga o kudaro tiki) received the Kishida Prize for Drama for being the best play in the year 1974. Some of the topics Shimizu's plays deal with include reality and illusion, the present and the past, and also memories of the past. His plays incorporate the past as well as the present. Furthermore, memory plays an important role in his plays as there is always the question of which character's memory is correct. These techniques are displayed in the play The Dressing Room two ghosts of two actresses are looking at two actresses who are still living. The plot of this play is based on the memories of these characters. One theme that is in many of his plays has to do with the city versus the country. Another theme that is present in some of Shimizu's plays is memories having power. Also, a longing and an affection for the past are themes present in his work. In many of Shimizu's plays the dramatic tension centers between siblings and their parents. For example, even though his plays are ironic or comedic, a death often occurs in the end.

In the play When We Go Down That Great Unfeeling River (Bokura ga hijō no taiga o kudaru toki) the main characters are a man, his oldest son, and his younger son. The play is set inside a public restroom. Overall, the play has to do with politics, however, other topics are also mentioned. In the play An Older Sister, Burning Like a Flame (Hi no yo ni samishii ane ga ita) the actor in the play has mental problems due to weird powers that a person who says she is his older sister is putting on him. Due to this he strangles his wife when it has been suggested that a brother and sister have had a child together. Shimizu seems to use the relationships among family members as an important point in his plays. Sometimes these relationships are harmful to his characters. Another thing that sometimes happens in Shimizu's plays are the personalities change from one character to a different character throughout the play. Another important theme that comes up in Shimizu's plays is the country versus the city. Shimizu sees the countryside as unsafe. The countryside represents the things that people run away from in their lives.

The Dressing Room (Gakuya) is a play that takes place backstage. In the play there are four actresses who are getting ready for a production of The Seagull, a play by Anton Chekhov. However, during the play it is learned that everything is not just what it seems. The play has theme of memory not being perfect and memory lasting beyond the body and into death.

== Style of Japanese plays in the 1960s ==
Shimizu Kunio wrote in the time period of the 1960s. Other Japanese playwrights who also wrote during this time period include Shūji Terayama, Jūrō Kara, Kōbō Abe, Minoru Betsuyaku, Shōgo Ōta and Ren Saitō. Like Shimizu these playwrights had memories of the war. The plays of the 1960s in Japan took on a style different style from shingeki, while shingeki strayed away from the traditional theatre of Japan and instead was inspired by the theatre of Europe, the 1960s style of angura, an avant-garde theatre movement, aspired to have a Japanese style. However, even though a Japanese style was a focus, European plays still influenced the plays of this time period. The Japanese theatre of the 1960s also was influenced by the Japanese styles of nō and kabuki. The body is a focus of plays in this time period. There was an emphasis on the live performance over the text.

== Influences ==
There are works of Shimizu that have become postwar theatre classics. He wrote that Kōbō Abe influenced him as well as being an example to him. Shimizu has recurring themes in his plays such as a frustrated search for a personal identity and madness. Furthermore, another common component of Shimizu's plays are having the central drama come from siblings and their parents. Shimizu also makes use of other literature, which usually comes from drama as well as poetry in the West. He uses these works in order to make his scenes more powerful. For example, An Older Sister, Burning Like a Flame (yō ni samishii ane ga ita) used the works of Othello by Shakespeare. Shimizu also appears to have a similar style as Anton Chekhov, a Russian playwright, in terms of how Chekhov uses a mixture of light humor as well as an intense feeling of wanting something. However, there are some differences between the works of Chekhov and Shimizu. For example, the characters of Chekhov are not capable of bringing out the energy and sense they need to change their lives. The characters of Shimizu, however, express a lot of energy. Also, in the works of Chekhov, usually the main character is alive in the end while in Shimizu's works the main character usually does not end up living.

Shimizu wrote many plays as the collection of his plays add up to forty-three. Another one of Shimizu's plays called When we go Down that Heartless River (Bokura ga Hijô no Taiga o Kudaro Toki) was first performed in the year 1972 is an example of an extended metaphor. In the year 1978 his play An Older Sister, Burning like a Flame(yō ni samishii ane ga ita) was written. The play is about the main character that has to deal with their past. In the play a main character is an actor who becomes tired of being in Othello, a play by Shakespeare. The main character then returns to his homeland that he has not been to since he was little. A motif that occurs in Shimizu's plays include the contrast between the city and the country. This is also present in Chekhov's work. For Shimizu the country is dangerous and the country is made into a metaphor to represent the things that humans run from in their lives and the things that humans are unable to deal with.

Another one of Shimizu's plays The Dressing Room is a little over an hour long. Shimizu uses a collage in order to indirectly convey his thoughts. This type of collage done in drama was created by Tadashi Suzuki. However, the whole play is not a collage. The Dressing Room is a play about an actress and three other actresses who died without ever getting fame. The three dead actresses are in the dressing room and wait so that they can be characters in a play that they will never be asked to take on. Shimizu's play Tango at the End of Winter goes back to the motifs and techniques that were used when he first began writing plays. In this play Sei tries to get freedom by performance however, the character ends up stuck in a movie theatre that is falling apart. The character chooses a ghost to be his partner. He dances a tango with a ghost, the ghost of his past. The other people cannot see who he is dancing with while he is able to see a peacock which is something he finds optimal, which he has chased ever since he was young.

Being born in the country also had an influence on Shimizu's work. Having lived both in the country and the city, he was able to compare both ways of life. His hometown in the country was an influence on his hometown memories and gave him inspiration in his writing.

== Works ==
=== Published works ===
- "Hana no Sakari ni... Kunio Shimizu Drama Collection" Teatro 1986
- "Kunio Shimizu's Complete Work" All four volumes, Kawade Shobo Shinsha, 1992. Works from 1958 to 1991
- "The Complete Work of Kunio Shimizu 1992-2000" Kawade Shobo Shinsha, 2000
- "Kunio Shimizu I・II" Hayakawa Theater Library, 2009
- I Signed / We are like reborn leaves / Dressing room
- II In the rainy summer, thirty Juliets returned / Elegy

=== Review collection [ edit ] ===
- Kunio Shimizu Theatrical Essays (3 volumes, Reklam Publishing, 1975–82)
- Tsukigata village willow book (Hakusuisha, 1985)
- Nostalgic maze outside the stage door (Hayakawa Publishing, 1994)

=== Research paper [ edit ] ===
- The World of Kunio Shimizu, Hakusuisha, 1982
- Rie Inoue, Kunio Shimizu's Brilliant Dramatic World, Social Hyoronsha, 2020. At the end of the book, a list of the release year and first performance of the Shimizu play. ISBN 978-4784511501

== Major plays ==
- Signatories (1958)
- Die in the Morning (1958)
- Let's put flowers there tomorrow (1959)
- Backlight game (1962)
- Truthful Frivolity (1968)
- Madman Still Omotenashi (1969)
- When we descend the merciless river (1972)
- Won't You Cry? Won't You Cry For 1973? (1973)
- Our Masakado, who is crazy about illusions (1975)
- The night of youth that fills the night with screams and frizzy hair (1976)
- Dressing room (1977) *The number of cumulative performances is the highest in Japan
- I have a sister who is as lonely as fire (1978)
- Drama adventure novel (1979)
- My Soul Is Shining Water (1980)
- A Flock of Love (1980)
- Thirty Juliets Returned in the Rainy Summer (1982)
- Elegy Father's dream dances (1983)
- Tango at the end of winter (1984)
- Lolita, the cat of salvation, is now... (1985)
- Blood Wedding (1986)
- Leaving Dreams, Orphee (1986)
- Brother (1990)
- Laughing (1991)
- Winter Horse (1992)
- A friend of youth in my dream (1995)
- Forest of Love (1995)
- Return (1998)
- People in love (2000)
- Invade a Broken Soul (2001)

=== Novel ===
- BARBER New Hama (1987) "Winter Boy" Kodansha, 1990. Others are "Kureichi"
- A Trip to Buy Tsukigata Kama (1988)
- Wind bird (1990) "Wind Bird" Bungeishunju, 1993. The above two works and "Uozu Buried Forest"
- Gorgeous River, Captive Heart (1991), later Kodansha, 1992. The other is "Rikijoden"
- A river with horse corpses (1994), not included in the book

=== Movie script ===
- A fulfilled life (1962, Shochiku)
- Her and Him (1963, ATG )
- Bwana Toshi's song (1965, Toho)
- Go to school of fish Africa (1966, Toho)
- Kitahotaka Zessho (1968, Toho)
- Gion Festival (1968, Toho)
- Lovers who were lost in advance (1971, ATG) * Co-written and directed by Soichiro Tahara
- Assassination of Ryoma (1974, ATG)
- Happiness sails (1980, Toei Central Film)
- Evil Spirit Island (1981, Kadokawa movie )

=== TV drama ===
- As You Like It 3rd "Secret of Genius" (1962, NET )
- As You Like It 17th "Hitch Hike" (1962, NET)
- Bank 8 o'clock theater "Blue food" (1963, NET)
- Creative Theater "Imogayu Prosperity" (1964, NHK education )
- Shionogi TV Theater "Arima Inako Hour Night Visitor" (1964, Fuji TV )
- Shionogi TV Theater "Arima Inako Hour Lost City" (1965, Fuji TV)
- Shionogi TV Theater " That person did not come backPart 1 Roof" (1965, Fuji TV)
- Young people (1966, NHK )
- Can't you cry "Pig and Marathon" (1966, TBS )
- Nissan Star Theater "Someone is waiting for you" (1967, NTV )
- Can't you cry? "Forbidden Play" (1968, TBS)
- Emergency work (1969, NHK)
- Galaxy drama "Peacock Road" (1970, NHK)
- Woman's theater " Shadow of frost " (1970, Fuji TV)
- Tragedy of Y (1970, Fuji TV )
- Winter story (1972-1973, NTV)
- The widow of 2-chome is a great mother with a child who is said to be a thin dump (1976, NTV)
- Autumn Diary (1977, NTV)
- Suicide (1978-1979, Tokai Television )
- Little My Way (1979-1980, NTV)
- Thursday Golden Drama "Farewell to Youth, Beloved Days!" (1981, NTV)
- Tuesday Suspense Theater "Disappeared without saying goodbye!" (1981, NTV)
- Water Woman That love invites murderous intent to the Aegean Sea! (1990, TV Asahi )
- Keyaki House (1993, NHK)
- Zero Focus (1994, NHK-BS2 )

=== Radio drama ===
- Irreplaceable days (1969, TBS Radio )
- Literary Theater "Strayers" (1974, NHK-FM )
- Why Toyamaru sank (1981, TBS Radio)
- FM Theater "To the Sea..." (1999, NHK-FM)

== Awards and honors ==
- 1958: Teatro Theater Award, Waseda Theater Award "Signature"
- 1974: Kishida Kunio Drama Award for "When we go down a heartless river"
- 1976: Kinokuniya Theater Award Individual Award "Night, night of youth that fills me with screams and back hair"
- 1980: Art Encouragement Newcomer Award ("Drama Adventure Novel"), Izumi Kyoka Literary Award ("My soul is shining water"), Teatro Theater Award "A group of love"
- 1983: Yomiuri Literary Prize for Elegy
- 1987: Candidate for the 98th Akutagawa Prize "BARBER New Hama"
- 1988: Candidate for the 100th Akutagawa Prize for "A Trip to Buy Tsukigata Kama"
- 1990: Candidate for the 103rd Akutagawa Prize for "Kazecho"
- 1990: Teatro Theater Award, Minister of Education Award for Art Encouragement for Younger Brother - A Message from a Maiden to Ryoma Sakamoto
- 1993: Art Encouragement Minister of Education Award for "Gorgeous River, Captive Heart"
- 1994: Kinokuniya Theater Award Group Award, Kinfuyusha
- 2002: Medal with Purple Ribbon
- 2008: Order of the Rising Sun, Gold Rays with Rosette
