= A Man Vanishes =

- Promotional release poster
- Directed by: Shōhei Imamura
- Produced by: Shōhei Imamura
- Starring: Yoshie Hayakawa; Shōhei Imamura; Shigeru Tsuyuguchi
- Cinematography: Kenji Ishiguro
- Edited by: Mutsuo Tanji
- Music by: Toshiro Mayuzumi
- Production companies: Art Theatre Guild; Imamura Productions; Nippon Eiga Shinsha
- Distributed by: Art Theatre Guild; Nikkatsu
- Release date: June 25, 1967 (Japan)
- Running time: 130 minutes
- Language: Japanese

A Man Vanishes (人間蒸発, Ningen jōhatsu) (lit. Evaporation of a person) is a 1967 Japanese pseudo documentary film by director Shōhei Imamura about a film team's search for a man reported missing.

== Plot ==
Tadashi Oshima, a 32-year-old salesman from Naoetsu, Niigata Prefecture, is reported missing. Together with Oshima's fiancée Yoshie Hayakawa, Imamura and his film team, including interviewer Shigeru Tsuyuguchi, visit relatives and co-workers to discover Oshima's whereabouts.

During their travels, it is revealed that none of the persons are who they initially seemed to be: Oshima, repeatedly described as a weak and obedient character, embezzled money from his company, was seeing another woman named Kimiko, and was reluctant to marry Yoshie because her older sister Sayo was living in an open relationship with another man. Sayo in turn suffered from repeated violent attacks by the ill-tempered Yoshie since childhood. Also, Yoshie suspects her sister of having had an affair with her fiancé, while the rest of the film team speculates if Yoshie is only acting out a plot.

Yoshie, Sayo, Tsuyuguchi and Imamura meet in a restaurant, joined by a fishmonger who claims that he repeatedly saw Sayo and Oshima together, which Sayo denies. The scenery is revealed to be a film set, and Imamura declares the settings and events to be fiction. In the last scene, the film team stages one of the meetings of Sayo and Oshima, which leads to an argument between Sayo, Yoshie and the fishmonger, each accusing the other of giving false testimony. Imamura wraps up the filming with the words, "the film is finished, but reality is not".

The film is interspersed with scenes of Oshima's relatives and Yoshie consulting different shamanic mediums about Oshima, one of which accuses Sayo of having murdered him out of jealousy.

== Cast ==
- Shigeru Tsuyuguchi as Interviewer
- Yoshie Hayakawa as herself
- Shōhei Imamura as himself

== Production ==
Imamura had taken interest in the phenomenon of ongoing vanishings of people in Japan, which summed up to thousands every year. He chose what he called the "most ordinary" case and met with the missing man's fiancée Yoshie Hayakawa. Imamura, who had planned to make a film on her research, was startled by what he saw as the woman's self-centeredness and tendency to perform in front of the camera. Imamura concluded that she wasn't interested in finding her fiancé at all, but found himself accused of the same by her in return. He decided to shift the film's focus towards her persona, often filming her secretly.

== Reception and themes ==
In a 1967 review, critic and filmmaker Nagisa Ōshima criticised Imamura for using (and failing at) the technique of documentary filming due to the film's lacking a theme, and the notion that a theme could emerge halfway during filming.

Following a 2012 US release tour of A Man Vanishes, Ronnie Scheib of Variety saw an "explosively provocative film" which "progressively and aggressively blurs distinctions between documentary and fiction". Manohla Dargis of The New York Times called it "wildly startling in its execution" and an "increasingly complex look at a man, his culture and his country", haunted by "questions of cinematic realism and how the camera changes everything".

Film scholar Alexander Jacoby read the depiction of shamanism in the film as a recurring theme in Imamura's works, showing "that superstition endured despite the technological advances of modern Japan".

== Awards ==
- Best Director award for Shōhei Imamura at the 1967 Mainichi Film Awards

== Home media ==
A region free NTSC DVD release was issued in October 2011 in the Masters of Cinema series. A region 1 NTSC DVD was released in 2012 by Icarus Films.
