= Iwanami Productions =

Japanese film production company

Iwanami Productions (岩波映画製作所, Iwanami Eiga Seisakusho) was a Japanese film production company. Founded in 1950 by people associated with the Iwanami Shoten publisher, it mainly focused on producing educational films and public relations documentaries. Iwanami, however, "allowed its filmmakers the (relative) freedom to stretch the limits of the public relations (PR) film". In the mid-1950s, Susumu Hani made two films, Children of the Classroom and Children Who Draw Pictures, that, according to the film scholar Markus Nornes, "with their radical spontaneity ... mark an important stylistic and theoretical break in the history of Japanese documentary". Younger filmmakers later formed the Blue Group (Ao no Kai) to discuss and debate documentary and cinema, and from their members emerged several of Japan's prominent postwar fiction and documentary film directors and cinematographers, including Shinsuke Ogawa, Noriaki Tsuchimoto, Kazuo Kuroki, Yōichi Higashi, Masaki Tamura, and Tatsuo Suzuki. Iwanami Productions filed for bankruptcy in 1998.
