= Toshio Matsumoto =

Japanese film director and video artist (1932–2017)

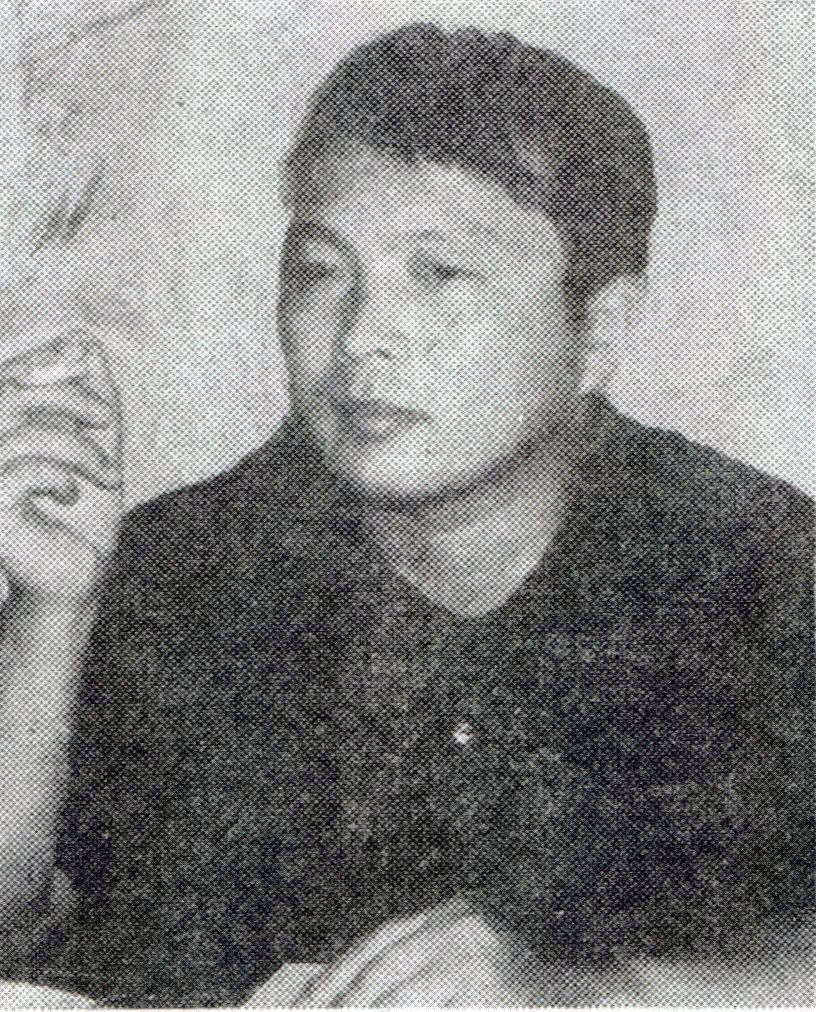
- Matsumoto in 1967
- Born: 25 March 1932; Nagoya, Aichi Prefecture, Empire of Japan
- Died: 12 April 2017 (aged 85); Tokyo, Japan
- Occupations: Director, video artist, screenwriter
- Known for: Japanese New Wave

Toshio Matsumoto (松本 俊夫, Matsumoto Toshio) (25 March 1932 – 12 April 2017) was a Japanese film director and video artist.

== Early life ==
Matsumoto was born in Nagoya, Aichi Prefecture, Japan and graduated from the University of Tokyo in 1955.

== Career ==
Matsumoto’s first short was Ginrin, which he made in 1955.

His most famous film is his first one: Funeral Parade of Roses (Bara no Sōretsu). The film was loosely inspired by Oedipus Rex, featuring a transgender woman (portrayed by Peter) trying to move up in the world of Tokyo Hostess clubs.

Matsumoto published many books of photography and was a professor and dean of Arts at the Kyoto University of Art and Design. There, he taught experimental filmmaker Takashi Ito. He was also president of the Japan Society of Image Arts and Sciences. In the early 1980s he taught at the Kyushu Institute of Art and Design (Kyushu Geijutsu Koka Daigaku).

== Death ==
Matsumoto lived in Tokyo until his death on 12 April 2017.

== Filmography ==
=== Feature films ===
Year	English title	Japanese title	Romaji	Notes
1969	Funeral Parade of Roses	薔薇の葬列	Bara no Souretsu	
1971	Demons (A.K.A. Pandemonium)	修羅	Shura	The title Shura refers to Asuras.
1976	The War of the 16 Year Olds	十六歳の戦争	Juuroku-sai no Sensou	
1988	Dogra Magura	ドグラ・マグラ	Dogura Magura	Based on the novel of the same name by Yumeno Kyūsaku.

=== Experimental and documentary short films ===
Year	English title	Japanese title	Romaji	Duration
1955	Bicycle (a.k.a. Bicycle in Dream and Silver Wheels)	銀輪	Ginrin	10 min
1956	Senkan	潜凾	Senkan	20 min
1959	Haru wo Yobukora	春を呼ぶ子ら	Haru wo Yobukora	20 min
1959	300 Ton Trailer	300トン・トレーラー	300 Ton Trailer	25 min
1959	US-Japan Security Treaty	安保条約	Anpo jōyaku	18 min
1960	Long White Line of Record	白い長い線の記録	Shiroi Nagai Sen no Kiroku	13 min
1961	The Weavers of Nishijin	西陣	Nishijin	26 min
1963	The Song of Stone	石の詩	Ishi no Uta	25 min
1967	Mothers	母たち	Haha-tachi	40 min
1968	For the Damaged Right Eye (A.K.A. For My Crushed Right Eye)	つぶれかかった右眼のために	Tsuburekakatta migime no tame ni	13 min
1969	Extasis	エクスタシス	Extasis	10 min
1971	Metastasis	メタスタシス 新陳代謝	Metastasis: Shinchintaisha	8 min
1972	Autonomy	オートノミー 自律性	Autonomy: Jiritsusei	12 min
1972	Expansion	エクスパンション 拡張	Expansion: Kakuchou	14 min
1973	Mona Lisa	モナ・リザ	Mona Lisa	3 min
1974	Fly	フライ 飛ぶ	Fly: Tobu	9 min
1974	Andy Warhol: Re-reproduction	アンディ・ウォーホル：複々製	Andi Uohoru: Fukubukusei	23 min
1975	Everything Visible Is Empty	色即是空	Shiki soku zekuu	8 min
1975	Young Girl	青女	Aoonna	30 min
1975	Phantom	ファントム 幻妄	Phantom	10 min
1975	Ātman	アートマン	Atman	11 min
1976	Kite	凧	Tako	30 min
1977	Black Hole	ブラックホール	Black Hole	3 min
1978	Enigma	エニグマ 謎	Enigma: Nazo	3 min
1979	White Hole	ホワイトホール	White Hole	7 min
1980	Ki or Breathing	気 Breathing	Ki - Breathing	30 min
1981	Connection	コネクション	Connection	10 min
1982	Votive Picture	絵馬	Euma	30 min
1982	Relation	リレーション 関係	Relation: Kankei	10 min
1982	Shift	シフト 断層	Shift: Dansou	9 min
1983	Formation	フォーメイション 形成	Formation: Keisei	9 min
1984	WAVE	WAVE	WAVE	7 min
1984	Delay Exposure	ディレイ・エクスポージャー	Delay Exposure	3 min
1985	EE Control	EEコントロール	EE Control	3 min
1985	Vibration	バイブレーション	Vibration	3 min
1985	Sway	揺らぎ スウェイ	Yuragi: Sway	8 min
1987	Engram	エングラム 記憶痕跡	Engram: Kioku konseki	15 min
1989	Trauma	トラウマ	Trauma	18 min
1990	Sign	気配	Kehai	20 min
1992	Disguise	ディシミュレーション 偽装	Dishimyureshon: Gisou	20 min

=== Other works ===
Year	English title	Japanese title	Romaji	Type
1962	Long Black Shadow of Record	黒い長い影の記録	Kuroi Nagai Kage no Kiroku	Radio play.
1964	Uso mo Honto mo Urakara Mireba	嘘もほんとも裏から見れば	Uso mo Honto mo Urakara Mireba	Theatre play.
1968	Magnetic Scramble	マグネチック・スクランブル	Magnetic Scramble	Video performance.
1968	Cine Mosaic			"Inter-media" piece.
1969	Projection for an Icon	イコンのためのプロジェクション	Ikon no tame no projection	"Inter-media" piece.
1969	Shadow	シャドウ	Shadow	"Inter-media" piece.
1970	Space Projection Ako	スペース・プロジェクション・アコ	Space Projection Ako	"Inter-media" piece.
1974	Mona Lisa for Multi-video	マルチビデオのためのモナ・リザ	Multivideo no tame no Mona Lisa	Video installation for 10 screens.
1974	Morning Dew	モーニング・デュー（あさつゆ）	Asa tsuyu	"Inter-media" piece.
1975	Total Theatre	トータルシアター・葵の上	Total Theatre	"Inter-media" piece.
1976	Yuuterasu, shikyuu	ユーテラス、子宮	Yuuterasu, shikyuu	Media piece.
1979	Aquarium	水族館	Suizokukan	Video installation for 3 screens, a water tank and fish.
1980	Cosmic Relation	コズミック・リレーション	Cosmic Relation	Images for mobile 3D screen.
1986	Multiconnection	マルチ・コネクション	Multiconnection	Installation for 1 16 mm camera and 4 screens.
1986	Articulation	アーティキュレーション 文節	Articulation: Bunsetsu	Installation for 6 screens and 1 camera.
1989	Luminous Globe	ルミナス・グローブ	Luminous Globe	Installation for a spherical screen and a torus rear screen.
1990	Legend of Urando	ウランド伝説	Urando Densetsu	Media theatre for 2 HDTV and a laser.
1992	Trap of Narratology	ナラトロジーの罠	Narratology no wana	Installation for 23 screens, rotating camera platform, a camera and a sand screen.

== Bibliography ==
- Matsumoto, Toshio, Eizo no hakken (1963)
- Matsumoto, Toshio (2012). "A Theory of Avant-Garde Documentary". Cinema Journal. 51 (4): 148–154. doi:10.1353/cj.2012.0099.
