= Blue Ribbon Award for Best Director =

Annual Japanese film award

- Awarded for: Best Performance by a Director
- Country: Japan
- Presented by: The Association of Tokyo Film Journalists
- First award: 1950

The Blue Ribbon Award for Best Director is a prize recognizing the work of a director of a Japanese film. It is awarded annually by the Association of Tokyo Film Journalists as one of the Blue Ribbon Awards.

== List of winners ==
| No. | Year | Director | Film(s) |
|---|---|---|---|
| 1 | 1950 | Tadashi Imai | Until We Meet Again |
| 2 | 1951 | Yasujirō Ozu | Early Summer |
| 3 | 1952 | Mikio Naruse | Lightning; Mother |
| 4 | 1953 | Tadashi Imai | Himeyuri no Tō |
| 5 | 1954 | Kenji Mizoguchi | The Crucified Lovers |
| 6 | 1955 | Shirō Toyoda | Meoto zenzai |
| 7 | 1956 | Tadashi Imai | Mahiru no ankoku |
| 8 | 1957 | Tadashi Imai | The Rice People; Jun'ai Monogatari |
| 9 | 1958 | Tomotaka Tasaka | A Slope in the Sun |
| 10 | 1959 | Kon Ichikawa | Odd Obsession; Fires on the Plain |
| 11 | 1960 | Kon Ichikawa | Her Brother |
| 12 | 1961 | Daisuke Itō | Hangyakuji |
| 13 | 1962 | Kon Ichikawa | Being Two Isn't Easy; The Broken Commandment |
| 14 | 1963 | Shohei Imamura | The Insect Woman |
| 15 | 1964 | Hiroshi Teshigahara | Woman in the Dunes |
| 16 | 1965 | Satsuo Yamamoto | Nippon Dorobō Monogatari; Shōnin no Isu |
| 17 | 1966 | Yoji Yamada | Un ga Yokerya |
| 18 | 1975 | Kinji Fukasaku | Graveyard of Honor; Cops vs. Thugs |
| 19 | 1976 | Shigeyuki Yamane | Saraba Natsu no Hikari Yo; Permanent Blue Manatsu no Koi |
| 20 | 1977 | Yoji Yamada | The Yellow Handkerchief |
| 21 | 1978 | Yoshitarō Nomura | The Demon; The Incident |
| 22 | 1979 | Shohei Imamura | Vengeance Is Mine |
| 23 | 1980 | Seijun Suzuki | Zigeunerweisen |
| 24 | 1981 | Kichitaro Negishi | Enrai; Crazy Fruit |
| 25 | 1982 | Kinji Fukasaku | Fall Guy |
| 26 | 1983 | Yoshimitsu Morita | The Family Game |
| 27 | 1984 | Juzo Itami | The Funeral |
| 28 | 1985 | Akira Kurosawa | Ran |
| 29 | 1986 | Kei Kumai | The Sea and Poison |
| 30 | 1987 | Kazuo Hara | The Emperor's Naked Army Marches On |
| 31 | 1988 | Makoto Wada | Kaitō Ruby |
| 32 | 1989 | Toshio Masuda | Shaso |
| 33 | 1990 | Masahiro Shinoda | Childhood Days |
| 34 | 1991 | Takeshi Kitano | A Scene at the Sea |
| 35 | 1992 | Masayuki Suo | Sumo Do, Sumo Don't |
| 36 | 1993 | Yōjirō Takita | We Are Not Alone |
| 37 | 1994 | Tatsumi Kumashiro | Like a Rolling Stone |
| 38 | 1995 | Shusuke Kaneko | Gamera: Guardian of the Universe |
| 39 | 1996 | Takeshi Kitano | Kids Return |
| 40 | 1997 | Masato Harada | Bounce Ko Gals |
| 41 | 1998 | Takeshi Kitano | Hana-bi |
| 42 | 1999 | Nagisa Oshima | Gohatto |
| 43 | 2000 | Junji Sakamoto | Face |
| 44 | 2001 | Isao Yukisada | Go |
| 45 | 2002 | Yoichi Sai | Doing Time |
| 46 | 2003 | Yoshimitsu Morita | Like Asura |
| 47 | 2004 | Hirokazu Koreeda | Nobody Knows |
| 48 | 2005 | Junya Sato | Yamato |
| 49 | 2006 | Miwa Nishikawa | Sway |
| 50 | 2007 | Masayuki Suo | I Just Didn't Do It |
| 51 | 2008 | Hirokazu Koreeda | Still Walking |
| 52 | 2009 | Miwa Nishikawa | Dear Doctor |
| 53 | 2010 | Yuya Ishii | Sawako Decides |
| 54 | 2011 | Kaneto Shindo | Postcard |
| 55 | 2012 | Kenji Uchida | Key of Life |
| 56 | 2013 | Tatsushi Ōmori | Bozo; The Ravine of Goodbye |
| 57 | 2014 | Mipo O | The Light Shines Only There |
| 58 | 2015 | Ryōsuke Hashiguchi | Three Stories of Love |
| 59 | 2016 | Sunao Katabuchi | In This Corner of the World |
| 60 | 2017 | Kazuya Shiraishi | Birds Without Names |
| 61 | 2018 | Kazuya Shiraishi | The Blood of Wolves |
| 62 | 2019 | Tetsuya Mariko | Miyamoto |
| 63 | 2020 | Ryōta Nakano | The Asadas |
| 64 | 2021 | Miwa Nishikawa | Under the Open Sky |
| 65 | 2022 | Chie Hayakawa | Plan 75 |
| 66 | 2023 | Yuya Ishii | The Moon; Masked Hearts |
| 67 | 2024 | Yu Irie | A Girl Named Ann |
| 68 | 2025 | Yoji Yamada | Tokyo Taxi |
