= Yoko Mizuki =

Japanese screenwriter

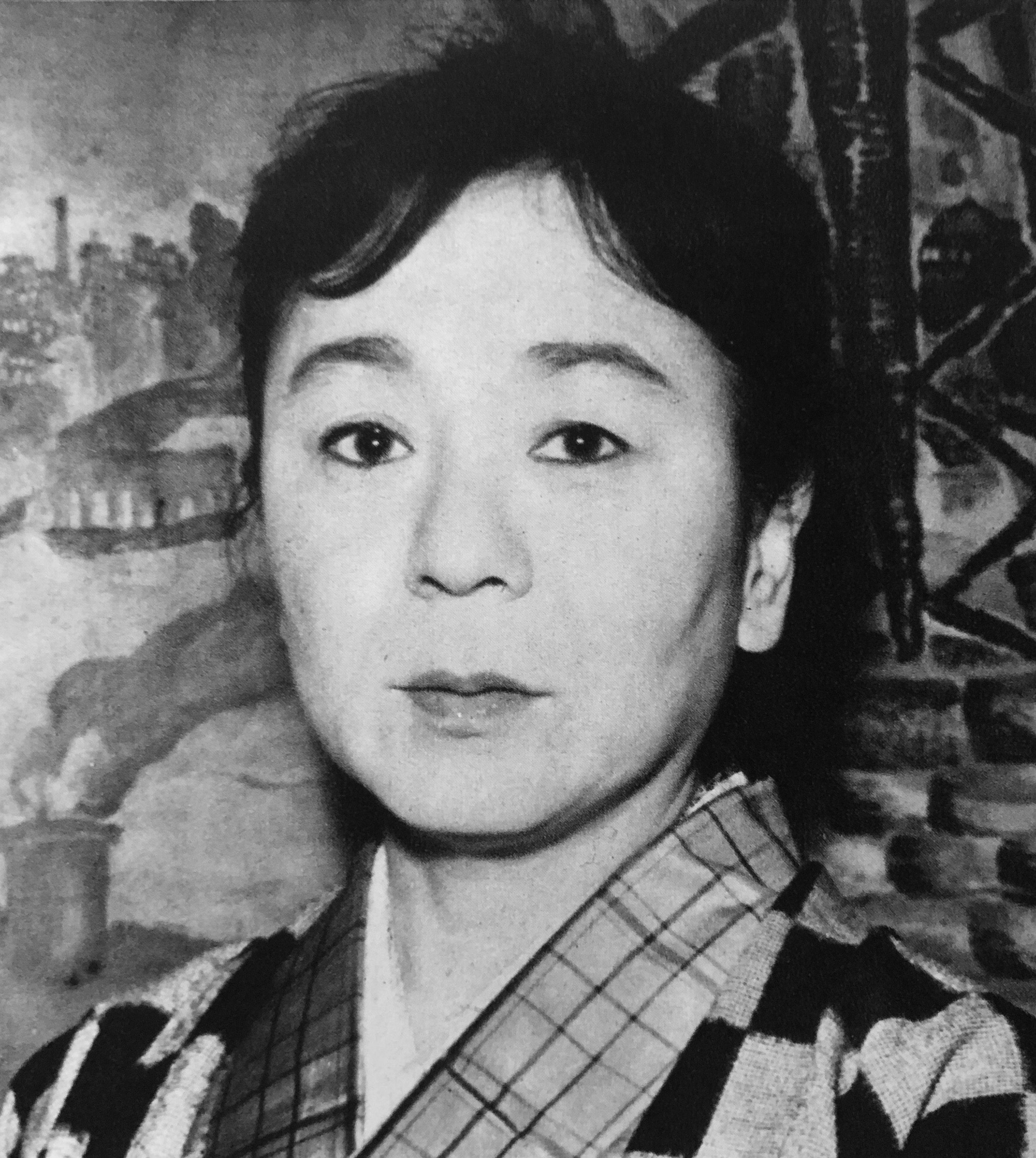
- Mizuki c. 1967
- Born: August 26, 1910; Kyōbashi, Tokyo, Japan
- Died: April 8, 2003 (aged 92); Ichikawa, Chiba, Japan
- Occupation: Screenwriter
- Years active: 1934–1995
- Spouse: Senkichi Taniguchi (m. 1938; div. 1939)

Yoko Mizuki (水木 洋子, Mizuki Yōko; 26 August 1910 – 8 April 2003) was a Japanese screenwriter. Born in Tokyo, she later graduated from Bunka Gakuin and began writing screenplays to support her family after her father died. Mizuki was active in the 1950s era of the Japanese studio system and is notable for her work with directors Tadashi Imai and Mikio Naruse. Her work had received several Best Screenplay Awards from Kinema Junpo, and she has been described in the book Women Screenwriters: An International Guide as "One of the most important and accomplished Japanese female screenwriters of all time".

== Biography ==
Yoko Mizuki was born under the name Tomiko Takagi on 26 August 1910 in Tokyo. Mizuki later graduated from Bunka Gakuin and began acting at the Tokyo Left-Wing Theater (Tokyo Sayoku Gekijo). Her father died, which led to her supporting her family by writing stage plays at the age of 23. During World War II, Mizuki wrote radio dramas.

Inspired by her Russian teacher Toshio Yasumi, she began screenwriting. Her first script was The Life of a Woman (1949) which was co-written with Yasumi. The film involves a pregnant woman who works in a printing plant under poor conditions. Her second screenplay for Until We Meet Again (1950) brought her acclaim and began her collaborations with director Tadashi Imai. Despite the praise for the film from Kinema Junpo, Mizuki claims that she was still struggling to write screenplays and had to re-write much of Until We Meet Again while it was filming.

Mizuki wrote the screenplay for Jun'ai Monogatari which won the Silver Bear at the Berlin International Film Festival . She also wrote unconventional topics for screenplays such as Kiku and Isamu (1959), a story about two mixed-race children in Okinawa. She was later awarded the Kinema Junpo awards for Best Screenplay for her work for These Are Harbour Lights (1961), The Age of Marriage (1961), Sweet Sweat (1964) and Kwaidan (1964).

In her later career, Mizuki worked extensively for television, with her credits including Ryoma Forever (1968) for the Japanese Broadcasting Corporation (NHK). Mizuki died on 8 April 2003 in Ichikawa, Chiba. Her former home was turned into the Mizuki Memorial Museum.

== Personal life ==
Before World War II, Mizuki was briefly married to director and screenwriter Senkichi Taniguchi who often collaborated with Akira Kurosawa.

Among her own 34 screen credits, Mizuki's favourite of films of her own works were Until We Meet Again, The Story of Pure Love, Kiku and Isamu and The Age of Marriage.

== Partial filmography ==
- The Life of a Woman (1949)
- Until We Meet Again (1950)
- An Inlet of Muddy Water (1953)
- Floating Clouds (1955)
- Night School (1956)
- Kiku and Isamu (1959)
- The Age of Marriage (1961)
- Sweet Sweat (1964)
- Kwaidan (1965)
