= Toei Company =

Japanese media corporation

Toei Company, Ltd.

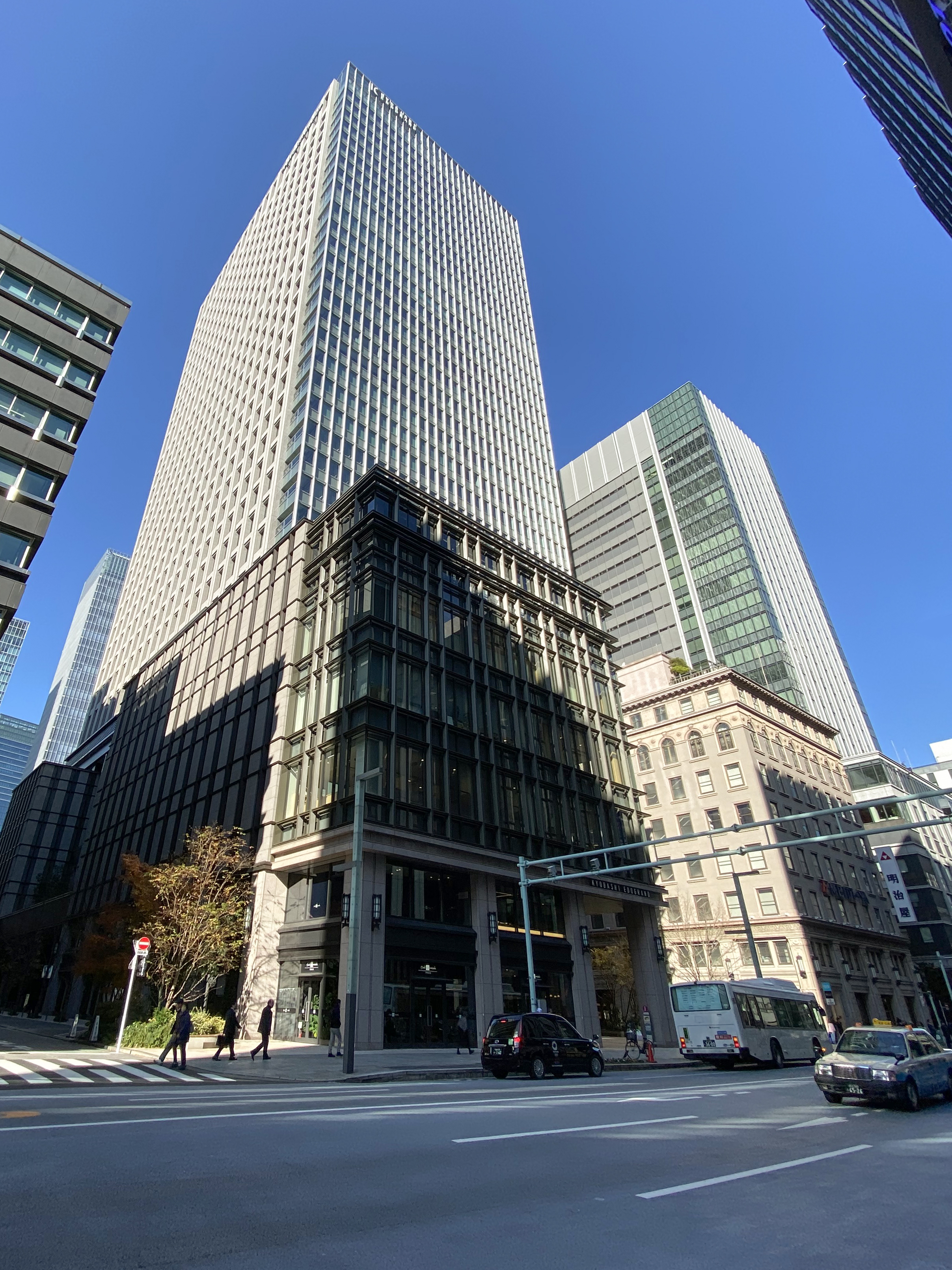
- Headquarters in Chūō, Tokyo
- Native name: 東映株式会社
- Romanized name: Tōei Kabushiki-gaisha
- Formerly: Tōkyō Eiga Haikyū (1949–1951)
- Type: Public
- Traded as: TYO: 9605
- Industry: Film and television Character licensing
- Predecessor: Toyoko Eiga Company; Ōizumi Films
- Founded: October 1, 1949; 77 years ago (as Tōkyō Eiga)
- Founder: Keita Goto
- Headquarters: Kyobashi Edogrand, 2-1 Kyōbashi 2-chome, Chūō, Tokyo, Japan
- Area served: Worldwide
- Key people: Noriyuki Tada (chairman); Fumio Yoshimura (President and CEO)
- Products: Motion pictures, television shows
- Services: Film and TV distribution and marketing
- Subsidiaries: Toei Video; Toei Advertising; Toei TV Production; Toei Kyoto Studios; Toei CM; Toei Labo Tech; Toei Satellite TV Company; T-JOY; Toei Hotel Chain; Toei Kenko; San-ei Printing; Toei Digital Labo; Toei Music Publishing; TES-Service; Toei Animation (34.2%)
- Website: toei.co.jp/entertainment/ toei.co.jp

Toei Company, Ltd. (Japanese: 東映株式会社, Hepburn: Tōei Kabushiki-gaisha; an acronym for Tōkyō Eiga Haikyū (東京映画配給) lit. 'Tokyo Film Distribution'; /ˈtoʊ.eɪ/) also simply known as Toei (東映, Tōei), is a Japanese entertainment company. Headquartered in Kyōbashi, Chūō, Tokyo, it is involved in film and television production, distribution, video game development, publishing, and ownership of 34 movie theaters. Toei also owns and operates studios in Tokyo and Kyoto and holds shares in several television companies. The company is renowned for its production of anime and live-action dramas known as tokusatsu, which incorporate special visual effects. It is also known for producing period dramas. Toei is the majority shareholder of Toei Animation and is recognized for its franchises such as Kamen Rider, Super Sentai and Power Rangers.

Toei is one of the four members of the Motion Picture Producers Association of Japan (MPPAJ), and is therefore one of Japan's Big Four film studios, alongside Kadokawa, Shochiku and Toho.

== History ==
Toei is a pioneer in the use of "Henshin"/"character transformation" in Live Action Television (TV) Film Video Game and Other's, Etc. Superhero martial-arts Mecha drama Franchises, a technique developed for the Kamen Rider, Metal Hero and Super Sentai series; the genre currently continues with Kamen Rider and Project R.E.D..

Toei's predecessor, the Toyoko Eiga Company, Ltd. (東横映画, Tō-Yoko Eiga; "Toyoko Films"), was incorporated in 1938. It was founded by Keita Goto, CEO of Tokyo-Yokohama Electric Railway, the direct predecessor to the Tokyu Corporation. It had erected its facilities immediately east of the Tōkyū Tōyoko Line; they managed the prewar Tōkyū Shibuya Yokohama studio system. From 1945 through the Toei merger, Tokyo-Yokohama Films leased from the Daiei Motion Picture Company a second studio in Kyoto.

On October 1, 1950, the Tokyo Film Distribution Company was incorporated as a subsidiary of Toyoko Eiga; in 1951 the company purchased Ōizumi Films. The current iteration of Toei was established on April 1, 1951 with Hiroshi Okawa as the first president. Through the merger, it gained the combined talents and experience of actors Chiezō Kataoka, Utaemon Ichikawa, Ryunosuke Tsukigata, Ryūtarō Ōtomo, Kinnosuke Nakamura, Chiyonosuke Azuma, Shirunosuke Toshin, Hashizo Okawa, and Satomi Oka.

In 1956, Toei purchased the Kyoto studio from Daiei. In 1956, Toei establishes an animation division, Toei Animation Company, Limited at the former Tokyo-Ōizumi animation studio, purchasing the assets of Japan Animated Films (日本動画映画, Nihon Dōga Eiga; often shortened to 日動映画 (Nichidō Eiga)).

Toei also bid on a license to start an education-focused TV station in 1956, which resulted in its part-ownership of Nippon Educational Television Co., now known as TV Asahi.

Shigeru Okada becomes the president & chief executive officer of Toei in 1971 and oversaw the adoptions of Toei's new business venture distributing foreign films in Japan in 1972.

In 1975, Toei opens the Toei Kyoto Studio Park. Toei Kyoto Studio's history reaches back to 1926 when Bando Tsumasaburo first developed a studio in what is now Uzumasa. Mitsuo Makino took over the property following the war in partnership with Toyoko Eiga and was absorbed along with Toyoko during Toei's merger.

Shigeru Okada becomes chairperson as Tan Takaiwa succeeds him as president and chief executive officer in 1993, establishing Toei Satellite TV Co., Ltd. and creates Toei Channel in 1998.

Asahi National Broadcasting Co., Ltd. (currently TV Asahi Holdings Corporation) is listed on the First Section of the Tokyo Stock Exchange in 2000, as shares of Toei Animation Co., Ltd. are listed on the over-the-counter market of the Japan Securities Dealers Association.

In 2011, Shigeru Okada, then chairperson emeritus, passes away, as Yusuke Okada and Noriyuki Tada become chairperson and president & chief executive officer of Toei in 2014.

Osamu Tezuka (not to be confused with the manga author and animator of the same name) became president and chief executive officer of Toei in 2020, as Noriyuki Tada succeeded Okada as chairperson. Toei also celebrated the 50th anniversary of the Kamen Rider Series in 2020. Tezuka initiated major structural reorganization in 2022 before passing in February 2023.

Tada temporarily assumed the role of CEO until Toei managing director and head of content Fumio Yoshimura was announced to succeed Tezuka as Toei's 7th president & chief executive officer. Recognizing Japan's shrinking market share, Yoshimura has vowed to continue with Tezuka's restructuring plans, and is looking towards North America and Asian markets to developing new projects and export existing IPs. Visiting Los Angeles for meetings with Hollywood studios together with Toei's studio head Yuji Kojima in 2025, Yoshimura announced Toei has budgeted US$1.6BN (JP¥240BN) for content and US$400M (JP¥60BN) to strengthen business operations.

On July 27, 2025, Toei closed its headquarters at the Toei Kaikan in Ginza, and relocated to Kyobashi Edogrand in Kyobashi. The closure also marked the end of Toei's cinema division as it wound down its operations in order for the company to focus on T-JOY.

Toei announced on April 21, 2026 that they were creating a games publishing division called Toei Games. This subsidiary will be focused on releasing games not based on Toei's existing intellectual properties.

== Branding ==
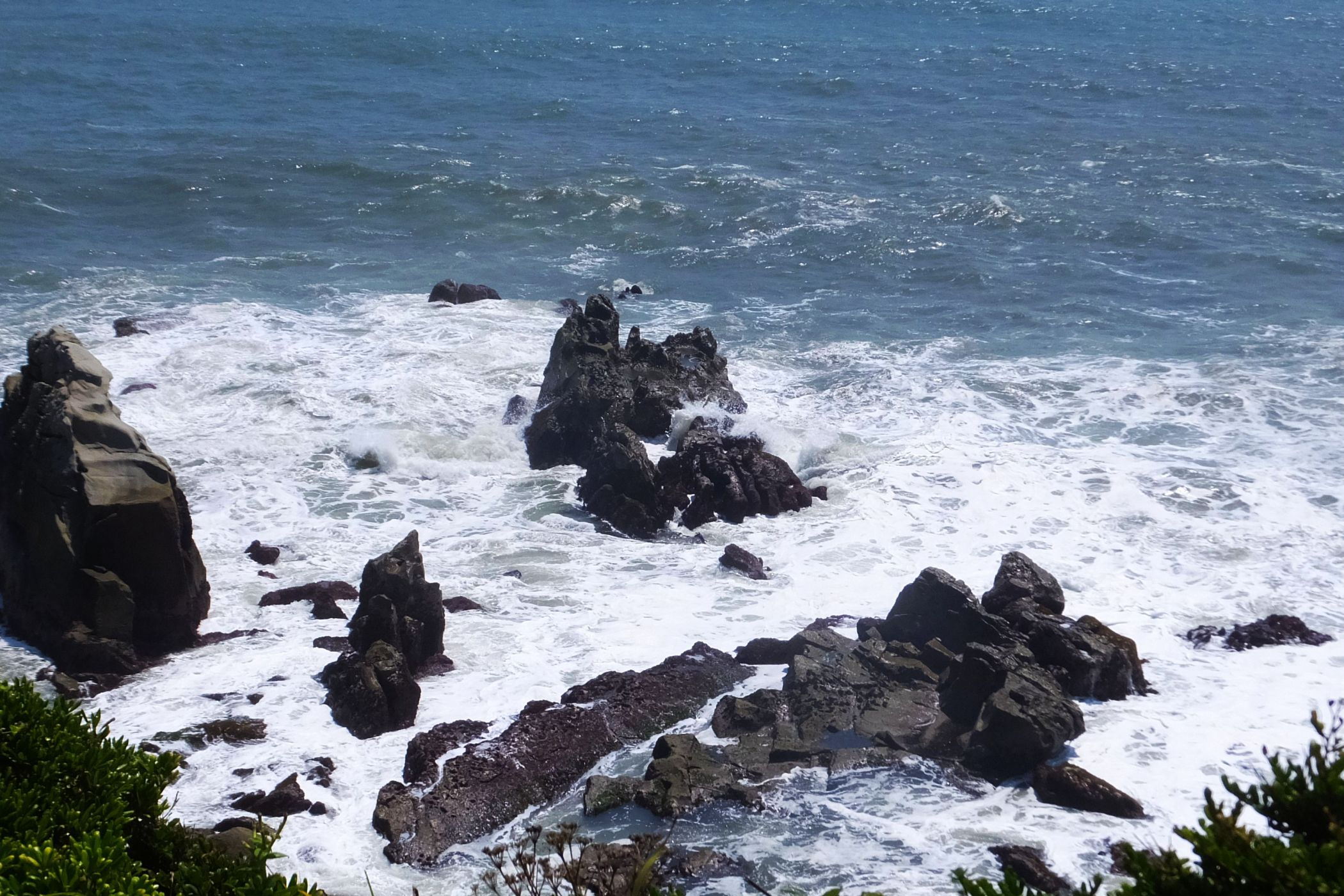
The rocks at Cape Inubō seen in the title card

The characters that make up Toei (東映, Tōei; "East Reflection") are the result of a portmanteau of Toei predecessor "Toyoko Eiga", and first seen in Toyoko Eiga's logo of a stylized triangle with the characters of 東 and 映 near the top. The logo was carried over by Toei following its merger of Toyoko and Ōizumi in 1951.

A black & white version of Toei's now iconic Wild Waves and Rocks (荒磯に波) opening credit was first used in 1954 on the Utaemon Ichikawa classic, The Idle Vassal: House of the Mysterious Phantom. It would be first seen in color in 1961 and has since been reshot with several iterations of the same rocks in the 70 years since it was first used.

The image features the Toei logo superimposed over a scene from Cape Inubō in Chiba, of three rocks in the surf beyond the beach as waves crash over the rocks. It has been seen in front of most live-action film & television produced and distributed by Toei, such as Street Fighter, Battle Royale, and Power Rangers, as well as in a handful of animated films, such as The End of Evangelion and films in the Dragon Ball series.

The logo's dynamic image, as opposed to the mostly static logos of its competitors, has helped make Toei's logo one of the most recognizable Japanese film company logos around the world.

== Film and television ==
=== Toei films ===
Toei started producing films in 1953. This list compiles the films by their original release date, their common English titles and Japanese titles. The Japanese titles are not necessarily direct translations of their English counterparts.

For feature films, Toei established itself as a producer of B-movies, that were made to fit into double bills and triple bills. It is predominantly known in the west for its series of action films and television series.

Release date	English film title	Original title	Notes	Ref(s)
1953	The Sun	Nichirin	Toei's first all-color film released.	
1954	The Idle Vassal: House of the Mysterious Phantom	Hatamoto Taikutsuotoko	First use of the iconic Toei "Wild Waves and Rocks" title card	
February 27, 1955	Bloody Spear at Mount Fuji	Chiyari Fuji	Recognized as one of actor Chiezō Kataoka finest roles	
March 19, 1959	A Story of Pure Love	Jun'ai Monogatari	Tadashi Imai won the Silver Bear for Best Director at the 8th Berlin International Film Festival	
August 14, 1960	Alakazam the Great	Saiyu-ki	First film adaptation of a Osamu Tezuka manga. Although credited as director, most of the direction was done by Yabushita Taiji. Also one of the earliest Toei anime films to be released in the United States.	
June 9, 1961	Drifting Detective: Tragedy in the Red Valley	Fūraibō tantei: akai tani no sangeki	Directorial debut of Kinji Fukasaku and first starring role for Sonny Chiba	
July 19, 1961	Invasion of the Neptune Men	Uchu kaizoku-sen	Starred Sonny Chiba as "Iron Sharp"	
April 28, 1963	Bushido, Samurai Saga	Bushidō zankoku monogatari	Won the Golden Bear at the 13th Berlin International Film Festival	
July 31, 1963	League of Gangsters	Gyangu Dōmei	Ryōhei Uchida's first starring role	
April 18, 1965	Abashiri Prison	Abashiri Bangaichi	A remake of the 1958 American film The Defiant Ones, Abashiri Prison starred Ken Takakura and became a popular franchise running for a total of 17 films.	
March 5, 1966	The Magic Serpent	Kai tatsu daikessen		
July 1, 1966	Terror Beneath the Sea	Kaitei Daisensō	U.S./ Japanese co-production	
December 21, 1966	Golden Ninja	Ōgon Batto (Golden Bat)	A film based off the kamishibai character of the same name by Takeo Nagamatsu and Suzuki Ichiro.	
August 13, 1967	Yongary, Monster from the Deep	Dai koesu Yongkari	South Korean/Japanese co-production	
December 1, 1968	The Green Slime	Gamma sango uchu dai sakusen	U.S./ Japanese co-production	
1969	Horrors of Malformed Men	Kyofu kikei ningen		
1970	Voyage Into Space	Giant Robo (Johnny Sokko and his Flying Robot)	Episodes of the Japanese TV series re-edited into a TV movie for U.S. release	
September 23, 1970	Tora! Tora! Tora!	Tora! Tora! Tora!	An international co-production with Twentieth Century Fox, the film featured an international cast and sought to present a balanced account of the attack on Pearl Harbor for both sides. It was praised for its historical accuracy and was nominated for five Oscars at the 43rd Academy Awards.	
1970	Venus Flytrap	Akuma no Niwa	Based on a 1950s unproduced screenplay by Ed Wood. Later released on video as Revenge of Dr. X.	
March 12, 1972	Under the Flag of the Rising Sun	Gunki Hatameku Moto ni	Submitted by Japan as their entry for the Best Foreign Language Film, but was not selected	
August 25, 1972	Female Prisoner 701: Scorpion		First of a series of 4 Female Convict Scorpion film franchise	
January 13, 1973	Battles Without Honor and Humanity	Jingi Naki Tatakai	The first in a five-film series based on articles by journalist Kōichi Iiboshi, eventually became an 11 film franchise most recently rebooted in 2000.	
February 2, 1974	The Street Fighter	Gekitotsu Satsujinken	starred Sonny Chiba; spawned 2 sequels, Return of the Street Fighter and Street Fighter's Last Revenge	
December 28, 1974	New Battles Without Honor and Humanity	Shin Jingi Naki Tatakai	A continuation of the Battles Without Honor and Humanity franchise expanding beyond the articles written by journalist Kōichi Iiboshi.	
April 26, 1975	Cops vs. Thugs	Kenkei tai Soshiki Bōryoku	Won two Blue Ribbon Awards in 1976 for Best Director (Fukasaku) and Best Actor (Sugawara).Complex named it number 6 on their list of The 25 Best Yakuza Movies.	
April 29, 1977	Legend of Dinosaurs & Monster Birds	Kyoryu-kaicho no densetsu		
January 21, 1978	Shogun's Samurai	Yagyū Ichizoku no Inbō	Adapted into a 39-episode TV series, The Yagyu Conspiracy (1978–1979), also produced by Toei.	
April 29, 1978	Message from Space	Uchu kara no messeji	Starred Sonny Chiba and Vic Morrow	
November 15, 1980	Shogun's Ninja	Ninja Bugeichō Momochi Sandayū	Hiroyuki Sanada's first lead role	
January 30, 1981	G.I. Samurai (a.k.a. Time Slip)	Sengoku jieitai	Starred Sonny Chiba	
April 29, 1983	The Ballad of Narayama	Narayama Bushikō	Directed by Shōhei Imamura adaptated from the book by Shichirō Fukazawa. Won the Palme d'Or at the 1983 Cannes Film Festival.	
May 13, 1989	Black Rain	Kuroi ame	Won multiple Japanese film awards and critical acclaim by American critics.	
October 17, 1998	Dr. Akagi	Kanzō-sensei		
June 5, 1999	Poppoya	Tetsudōin	Best Film at the Japan Academy Awards, it was submitted to the 72nd Academy Awards for Best Foreign Language Film, but was not accepted as a nominee.	
November 25, 2000	New Battles Without Honor and Humanity	Shin Jingi Naki Tatakai	Reboot of the popular franchise from 1973.	
December 16, 2000	Battle Royale	Battle Royal	Embargoed from US distribution due to violence, finally released straight-to-DVD to critical acclaim in 2010 following praise by Quentin Tarantino.	
May 1, 2008	Partners: The Movie	AIBOU: The Movie	Based on the television series AIBOU: Tokyo Detective Duo, it was the first in the Aibou (Partners) film series.	
December 23, 2011	Admiral Yamamoto	Rengō Kantai Shirei Chōkan Yamamoto Isoroku		
September 3, 2013	Space Pirate Captain Harlock	a.k.a. Harlock: Space Pirate	Toei Animation Production	
December 5, 2015	125 Years Memory	Kainan 1890	Co-produced by Toei, Creators' Union, Böcek Yapım	
May 17, 2019	First Love	Hatsukoi	Distributor, produced by OLM	
June 25, 2021	The Goldfish	Umibe no Kingyō		
March 17, 2023	Shin Kamen Rider	Shin Kamen Rider	Reboot of the original 1971 series by Hideaki Anno	
June 27, 2025	Sham	Detchiage: Satsujin Kyoshi to Yobareta Otoko		

=== Toei distributed films ===
Original producer	Year	Title	Original title	Notes	Ref(s)
Shin-eiga Co., Ltd.	1950	Golden Bat: The Phantom of the Skyscraper	Ōgon Batto: Matenrô no Kaijin	A film based off the kamishibai character of the same name by Takeo Nagamatsu and Suzuki Ichiro, but mainly based on the manga adaptation by Shōnen Gahōsha.	

=== Toei produced/distributed shows ===
==== Primary (Big 4 Toei Superheroes) ====
Year	Title	Country	Production	Super Hero Time	First release	Latest release	Upcoming release	Role	Genre
1971–present	Kamen Rider franchise	Japan	Ishimori Productions; TV Asahi; ADK Emotions	Sunday; 9:00 (JST)	Kamen Rider (1971)	Kamen Rider MY-TH (2026)	Untitled Kamen Rider entry (TBA)	Hero	Tokusatsu
1975–present (hiatus since 2026)	Super Sentai franchise	Japan	Ishimori Productions; Saburo Yatsude; TV Asahi; Toei Advertising	Saturday; 7:30 (JST)	Himitsu Sentai Gorenger (1975)	No.1 Sentai Gozyuger (2025)	Untitled Super Sentai entry (TBA)	Hero	Tokusatsu
1982–present (hiatus since 1999)	Metal Hero franchise	Japan	Saburo Yatsude; TV Asahi; ADK Emotions	Saturday; 8:00 (JST)	Space Sheriff Gavan (1982)	Tetsuwan Tantei Robotack (1998)	Untitled Metal Hero entry (TBA)	Hero	Tokusatsu
2026–present	Project R.E.D. franchise	Japan	Saburo Yatsude; TV Asahi; Toei Advertising	Sunday; 9:30 (JST)	Super Space Sheriff Gavan Infinity (2026)	Kakusei Hunter Omegahorn (2026)	Untitled Project R.E.D. entry (TBA)	Hero	Tokusatsu

==== Secondary (Others) ====
Year	Title	Country	Role	Genre
1951–present	Darna (co-product with Mars Ravelo)	Philippines	Hero	Tokusatsu
1953–present	Dyesebel (co-product with Mars Ravelo)	Philippines	Hero	Tokusatsu
1964–present	Captain Barbell (co-product with Mars Ravelo)	Philippines	Hero	Tokusatsu
1965–present	Lastikman (co-product with Mars Ravelo)	Philippines	Hero	Tokusatsu
1981–1993	Fushigi Comedy franchise	Japan	Hero and Heroine	Tokusatsu
1993–present	Power Rangers franchise (co-product with Hasbro)	United States	Hero	Live Action
1994–1996	VR Troopers	United States	Hero	Live Action
1995–1996	Masked Rider	United States	Hero	Live Action
1996–1998	Big Bad Beetleborgs (later Beetleborgs Metallix)	United States	Hero	Live Action
2003–2004	Pretty Guardian Sailor Moon (Live action series)	Japan	Heroine	Tokusatsu
2004–present	Pretty Cure franchise	Japan	Heroine	Anime
2007–2008	Zaido: Pulis Pangkalawakan	Philippines	Hero	Tokusatsu
2008–2009	Kamen Rider: Dragon Knight	United States	Hero	Live Action
2012–2013	Unofficial Sentai Akibaranger	Japan	Hero	Tokusatsu
2016–2017	Kamen Rider Amazons	Japan	Hero	Tokusatsu
2017	Power Rangers Dino Force Brave	South Korea	Hero	Tokusatsu
2022	Kamen Rider Black Sun	Japan	Hero	Tokusatsu
2023	Voltes V: Legacy	Philippines	Hero	Tokusatsu
2023–present	Shin Japan Heroes Universe	Japan	Hero	Tokusatsu
2024–present	Oshi no Ko	Japan	Heroine	Live Action
2025–present	Ameku Takao's Detective Karte	Japan	Heroine	Live Action
2026–present	The Kamen Rider Chronicle film franchise	Japan	Hero	Tokusatsu
2026–present	The Kamen Rider Animated film franchise	Japan	Hero	Tokusatsu
2026–present	The Kamen Rider Premium film franchise	Japan	Hero	Tokusatsu
202? (scheduled)	Daimos (Live action series)	Philippines	Hero	Tokusatsu
2030 (scheduled)	Raiden franchise (co-product with MOSS)	Japan	Heroine	Tokusatsu

=== Shows created with Shotaro Ishinomori ===
- Nebula Mask Machineman
- Android Kikaider
- Kikaider 01
- Inazuman
- Kaiketsu Zubat
- Robotto Keiji
- Akumaizer 3
- Kyodai Ken Byclosser
- Space Ironman Kyodain
- Henshin Ninja Arashi
- Sarutobi Ecchan

=== Video games ===
- Ninja Hayate (1984)
- Time Gal (1985)
- The Masked Rider: Kamen Rider ZO (1994)
- Chameleon Twist (1997)
- Chameleon Twist 2 (1998)

== Saburo Yatsude ==
Saburō Yatsude (八手 三郎, Yatsude Saburō; alternatively read as Saburo Hatte) is a collective pseudonym used by Toei Company television producers, and formerly Toei Animation producers, when contributing to its various anime and tokusatsu series; similar to Bandai Namco Filmworks' Hajime Yatate. The use of the pen name began with The Kagestar and has been used throughout the Super Sentai (in the adapted Power Rangers series starting with Power Rangers Ninja Storm, the credits list Saburo Hatte. Before this, the credits listed "Original Concepts by Saburo Yatsude") and Metal Hero Series as well as for Spider-Man, Choukou Senshi Changéríon, Video Warrior Laserion, Chōdenji Robo Combattler V, Chōdenji Machine Voltes V, Tōshō Daimos, Daltanious, Space Emperor God Sigma, Beast King GoLion and Kikou Kantai Dairugger XV. The name is also used as a contributor to the soundtracks for the series.

Toei Animation stopped using Saburo Yatsude in 1999, and it began to use Izumi Todo instead. The first anime that was created by Izumi Todo was Ojamajo Doremi.

In the Unofficial Sentai Akibaranger series, Saburo Hatte is an actual person who is godlike within the fictional reality that the show takes place in. In fact, his hand appears at the end of the first half of the series to cover the camera lens and end the show, later having the second half be made under Malseena's influence while in the hospital in the real world.

In the Doubutsu Sentai Zyuohger spinoff, Super Animal War's third episode, he is portrayed by Jun Hikasa.

On April 3, 2016, an unknown Toei staff member going by Saburo Yatsude was interviewed while wearing a "Giraffe Zyuman" mask in reference to Zyuohger.

=== Original creator ===
==== Live action ====
- The Kagestar (1976-1977)
- Ninja Captor (1976-1977)
- Spider-Man (1978-1979)
- Choukou Senshi Changéríon (1996)

==== Anime ====
- Robot Romance Trilogy (1976-1979)
- Future Robot Daltanious (1979-1980)
- Space Emperor God Sigma (1980-1981)
- Beast King GoLion (1981-1982)
- Armored Fleet Dairugger XV (1982-1983)
- Lightspeed Electroid Albegas (1983-1984)
- Video Warrior Laserion (1984-1985)

=== Script ===
==== Television ====
- Sore Kara no Musashi (1964-1965)
- Mito Kōmon (1964-1965)
- Kamen Rider (1971-1973)
- Himitsu Sentai Gorenger (1975-1977)
- Space Sheriff Gavan (1982-1983)

==== Web series ====
- From Episode of Stinger - Uchu Sentai Kyuranger: High School Wars (2017)
- Kikai Sentai Zenkaiger Spin-Off: Zenkai Red Great Introduction! (2021)
- Avataro Sentai Donbrothers Meets Kamen Rider Den-O: Aim! Don-O (2022)

=== Director ===
- Nebula Mask Machineman (1984)

== See also ==
- Toho
- Shintoho
- Tsuburaya Productions
- Daiei Film
- Kadokawa Daiei Studio
- Kadokawa Shoten
- Nikkatsu
- Shochiku
- Gainax
- Group TAC
- Production I.G
- Studio Ghibli
- Sony Music Entertainment (Japan) Inc.
- Sega Enterprises
- TV Tokyo
- Tatsunoko Pro
- Topcraft Limited Company
- Toei Animation Company, Ltd.
- Toei Superheroes
- Toei Fushigi Comedy Series
