= Sumiko Hidaka =

Japanese actress (1923–2008)

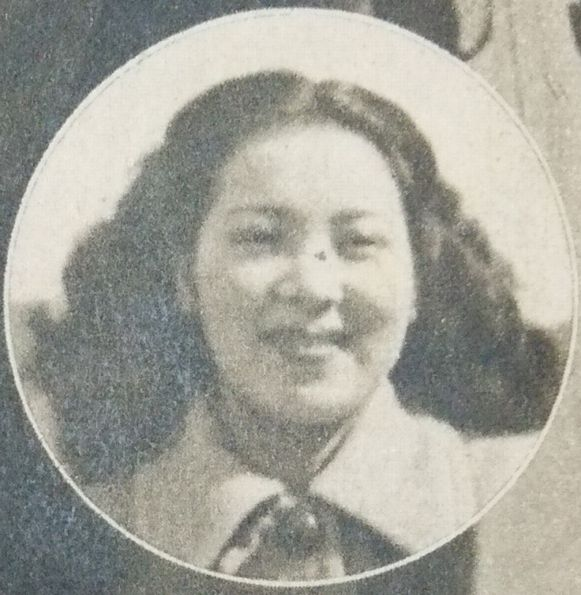
- Born: 5 March 1923; Kyoto, Japan
- Died: 1 August 2002 (aged 79); Tokyo, Japan
- Occupation: Actress
- Years active: 1936–1985

Sumiko Hidaka (日高澄子, Hidaka Sumiko; 5 March 1923 – 1 August 2002) was a Japanese actress. She appeared in films of Tadashi Imai, Kaneto Shindō, Masahiro Shinoda and others.

== Selected filmography ==
- Dedication of the Great Buddha (1952)
- Epitome (1953)
- Life of a Woman (1953)
- An Actress (1956)
- The Hole (1957)
- Night Drum (1958)
- The Twilight Story (1960)
- The Mad Fox (1962)
- Akitsu Springs (1962)
- Double Suicide (1969)
- Farewell to the Land (1982)
