= Shinjirō Ehara =

Japanese actor (1936–2022)

- Born: 12 October 1936; Kyoto, Japan
- Died: 27 September 2022 (aged 85)
- Occupation: Actor
- Years active: 1954–2022
- Spouse: Hitomi Nakahara (m. 1960–2022)

Shinjirō Ehara (Japanese: 江原 真二郎, Hepburn: Ehara Shinjirō; 12 October 1936 – 27 September 2022) was a Japanese actor. Ehara joined Toei Company and began his acting career with"Nagurikomi Nijyuohachinin shu". In 1957, he won Elan d'or Award for Newcomer of the Year. He died on 27 September 2022, aged 85.

== Selected filmography ==
=== Film ===
- Jun'ai Monogatari (1957)
- The Rice People (1957)
- Naked Sun (1957)
- Rice (1957)
- Invasion of the Neptune Men (1961) as scientist Yanagida
- Miyamoto Musashi: Hannyazaka no kettō (1962) as Seijurō Yoshioka
- Bushido, Samurai Saga (1963)
- Miyamoto Musashi: Nitōryū kaigen (1963) as Seijurō Yoshioka
- Miyamoto Musashi: Ichijōji no kettō (1964) as Seijurō Yoshioka
- Jakoman and Tetsu (1964) as Osaka
- Wolves, Pigs and Men (1964) as Mizuhara
- Blackmail Is My Life (1968)
- Outlaw:Kill! (1968)
- Sleepy Eyes of Death 12: Castle Menagerie (1969)
- Bakumatsu (1970)
- Men and War Part I (1970)
- Men and War Part II (1971)
- Under the Flag of the Rising Sun (1972)
- Kage Gari (1972)
- Men and War Part III (1973)
- Nichiren (1979)
- Edo Jō Tairan (1991) as Ōkubo Tadatomo

=== Television ===
- Daichūshingura (1971) as Kataoka Gengoemon
- Shinsho Taikōki (1973) as Takeda Katsuyori
- Naruto Hichō (1977–78) as Magobei
- Kusa Moeru (1979) as Kajiwara Kagetoki, Taiga drama
- Fumō Chitai (1979) as Isao Kawamata
- Tokugawa Ieyasu (1983) as Ishikawa Kazumasa, Taiga drama
- Ōoku (1983) as Yamauchi Igasuke
- Kawaite sōrō (1984)
- Miyamoto Musashi (1984–85) as Aoki Tanzaemon
- Hōjō Tokimune (2001) as Kō no Morouji, Taiga drama
- Kokoro (2003)
