= Meidi-Ya =

Japanese grocery retail chain

Meidi-Ya, Co. Ltd. 株式会社明治屋

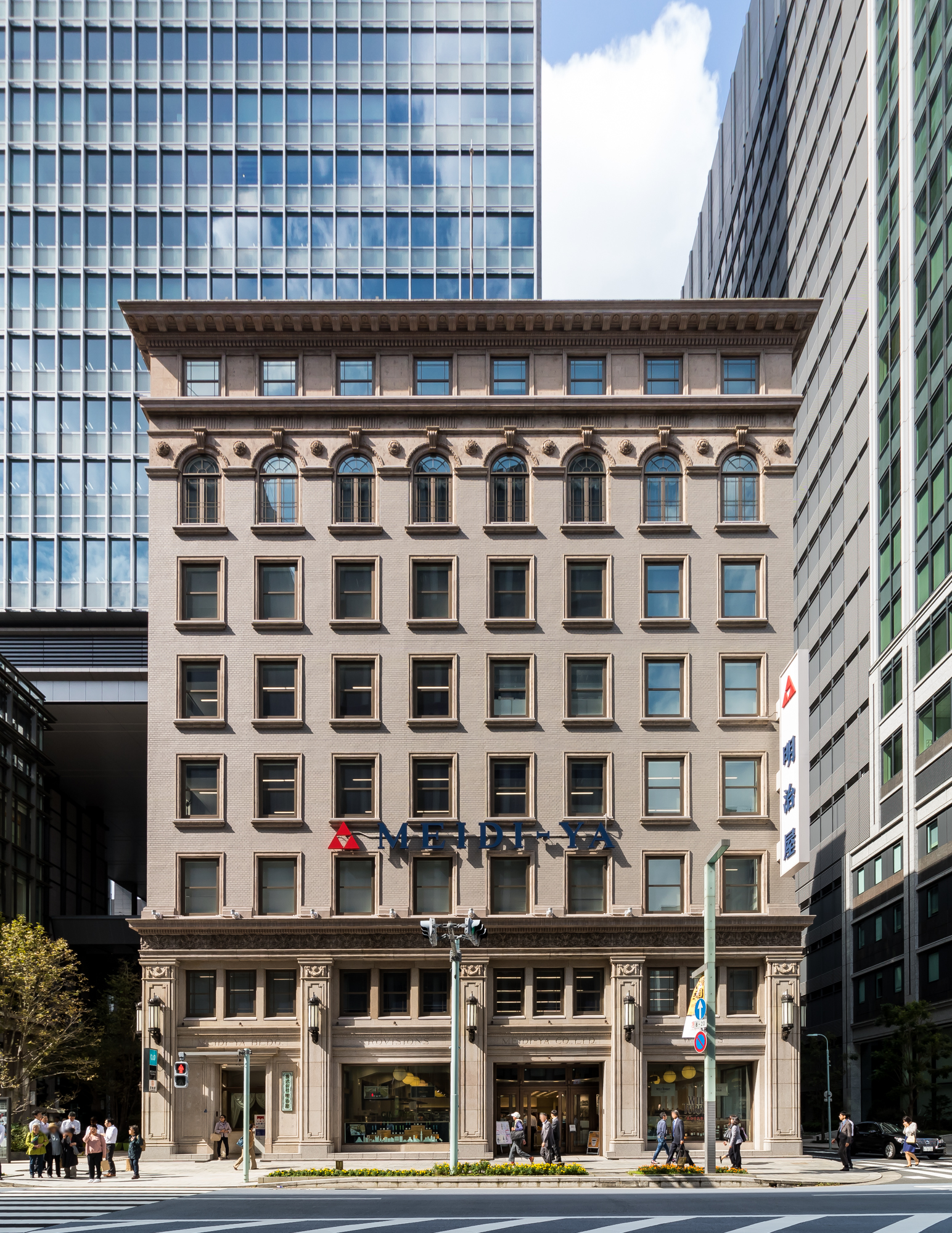
- Meidi-Ya Main Store in Kyōbashi, Tokyo
- Company type: KK
- Industry: Retail
- Founded: 1885
- Founder: Isono Haraku
- Headquarters: Kyōbashi, Chūō, Tokyo, Japan
- Area served: Japan and Singapore
- Website: http://www.meidi-ya.co.jp/

Meidi-Ya, Co. Ltd. (株式会社明治屋, Kabushiki-kaisha Meiji-ya) is a Japanese upmarket grocery store chain. Its headquarters are in Kyōbashi, Chūō, Tokyo. It is also a major wholesale distributor.

== Overview ==
Meidi-Ya was established in 1885 by Isono Hakaru (磯野 計). Meidi-Ya has 14 locations in Greater Tokyo, 7 stores in other parts of Japan, and two stores in Singapore. As of 1989, the chain was one of the principal purveyors of the Japanese royal family.

The English name Meidi-ya is the Nihon-shiki romanization of the Japanese name. Many foreigners in Japan have pronounced the name with a hard "d" instead of a "j". The di romanization is characteristic of Nihon-shiki.

Meidi-Ya specializes in sale and production of food and beverages, importing and exporting of food products, wines and spirits, ship equipment, sale of industrial products, leasing and import of machinery, real estate, etc.

== Locations ==
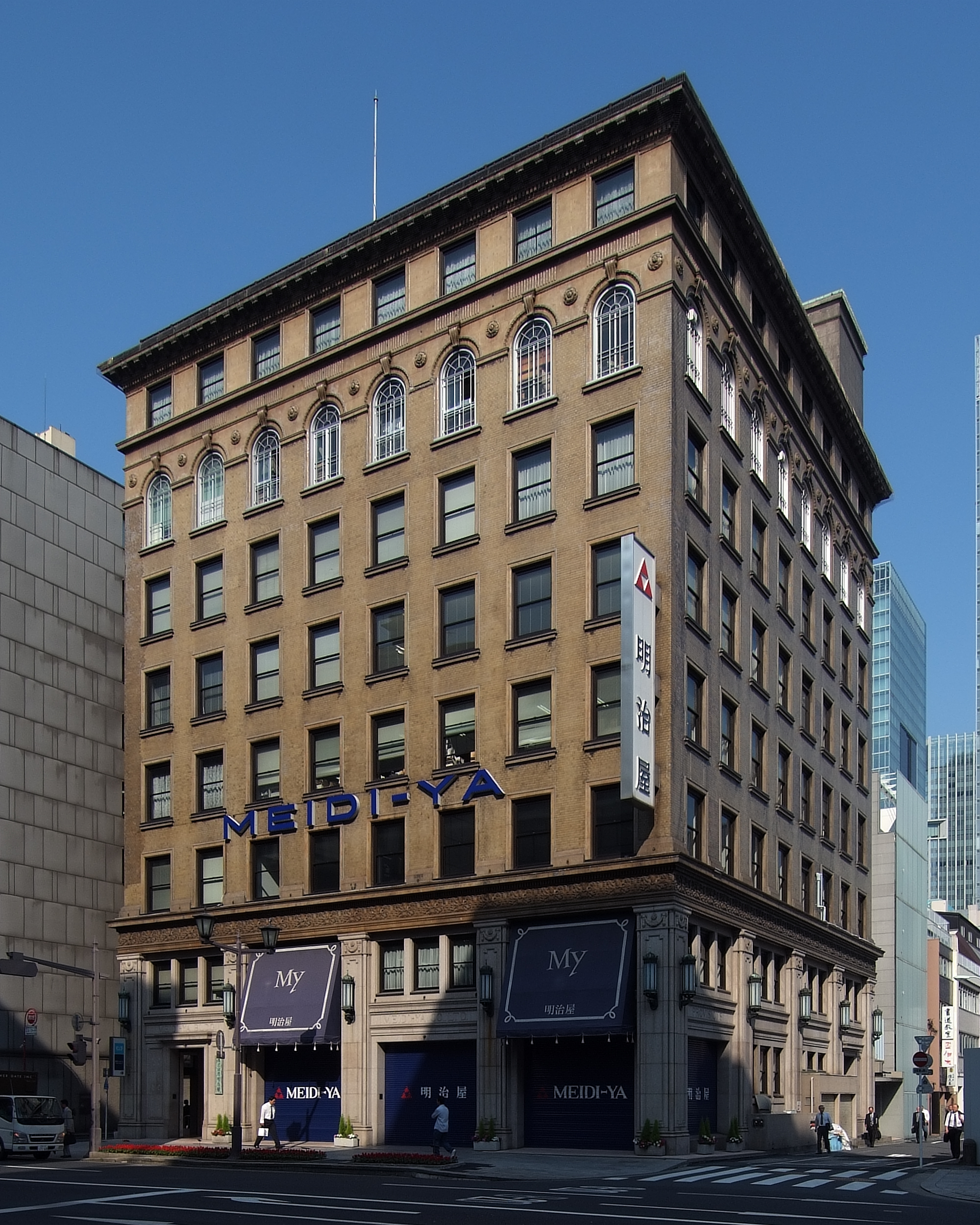
1933-built Kyobashi mainstore in 2009

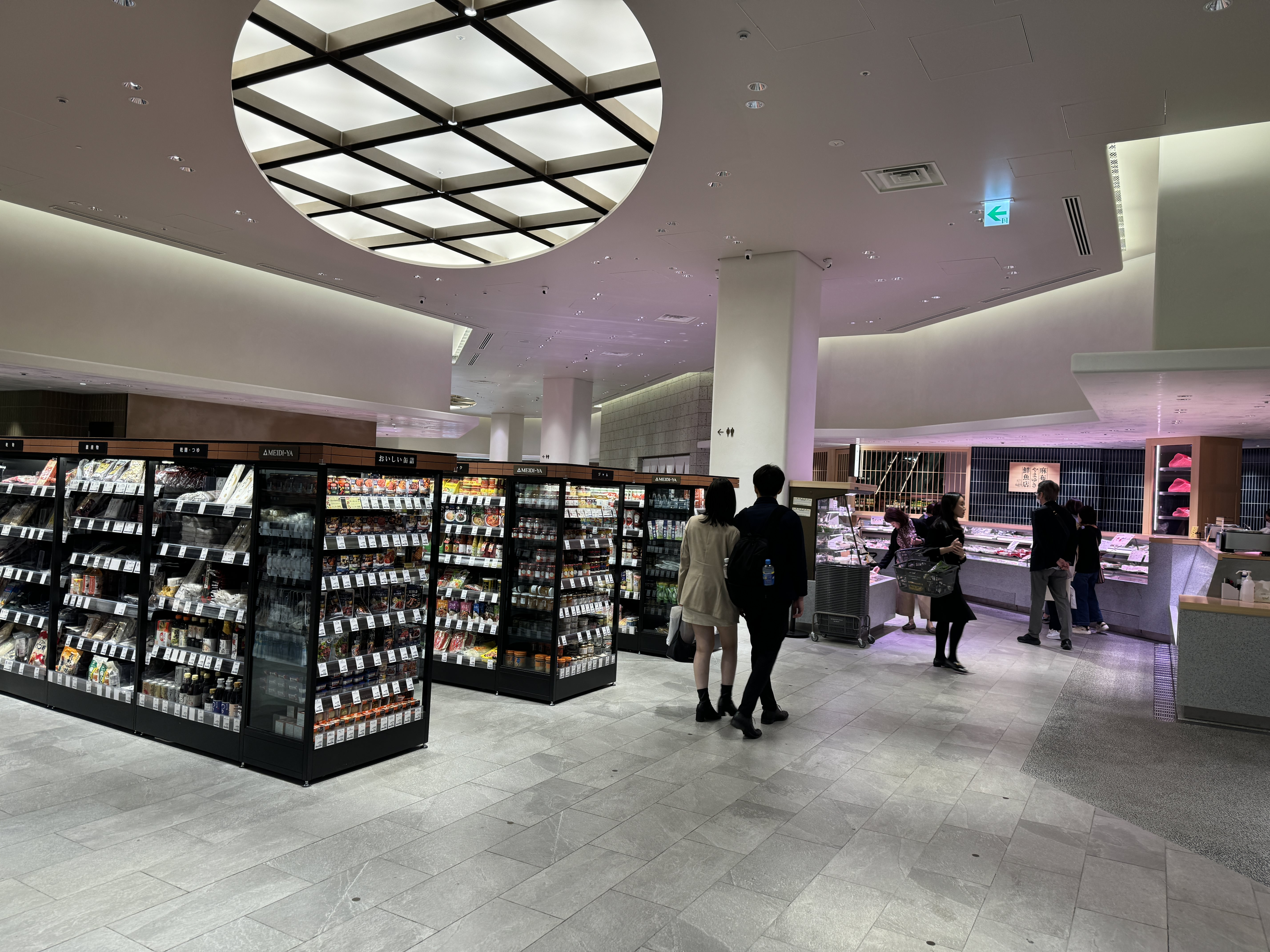
Interior of the Azabudai Hills store in 2024

Japan:

- Kyobashi main store
- Marunouchi Building
- Hiroo
- Roppongi
- Azabudai Hills
- Tamagawa Takashimaya
- Aobadai
- Sendai Ichinbancho
- Shibuya
- Shibuya Yamanote
- Shinjuku West
- Tachikawa
- Konandai
- Fujisawa
- Omiya
- Takasaki
- Niigata
- Hamamatsu
- Nagoya Station
- Nagoya Sakae
- Kyoto Sanjo
- Kyoto Shijokawaramachi Takashimaya
- Osaka Namba
- Okayama
- Matsuyama
- Fukuoka Tenjin

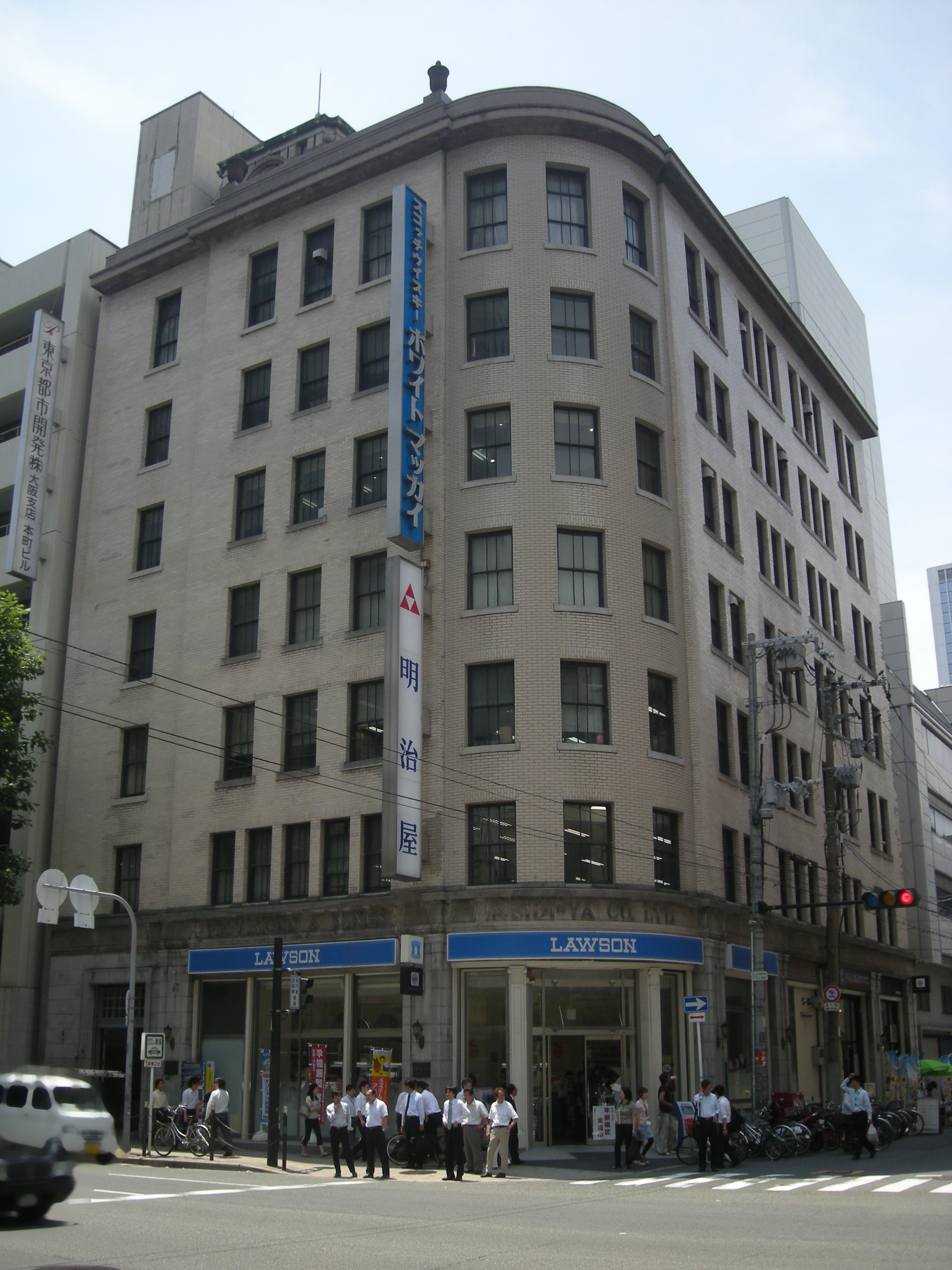
1924-built former Osaka store

Singapore:

- Millenia Walk
- Great World

The Netherlands:

- Amsterdam (closed)
