= The Goldfish: Dreaming of the Sea =

2021 film

- Directed by: Sara Ogawa
- Written by: Sara Ogawa
- Produced by: Daiju Koide
- Starring: Miyu Ogawa Runa Hanada Tateto Serizawa
- Cinematography: Yutaka Yamazaki
- Music by: Takashi Watanabe
- Production company: Toei Company
- Release date: June 25, 2021
- Running time: 76 minutes
- Country: Japan
- Language: Japanese

The Goldfish: Dreaming of the Sea (Japanese: 海辺の金魚, Hepburn: Umibe no Kingyo) is a 2021 Japanese dramatic film directed by Sara Ogawa. and starring Miyu Ogawa and Runa Hanada After premiering at the 2021 Jeonju International Film Festival in South Korea, it was released in Japan on June 25, 2021.

== Plot ==
Hana is a high school student living in foster care after her mother's arrest ten years prior. As she is now 18, this will be her last summer living in the group home . In the home, she gradually befriends and tries to cares for Harumi, a young girl who struggles to adjust to the group home after being abused by her mother. Eventually Harumi leaves foster care to be reunited with her mother, now released from prison. However, Hana is concerned she will continued to be abused by her mother and leaves to find her with the help of her friend Kanta.

== Cast ==
- Miyu Ogawa as Hana Setoguchi
- Runa Hanada as Harumi
- Tateto Serizawa as Tsutomu Takayama
- Nayuta Fukuzaki as Kanta Ōno

== Production ==
The Goldfish is Sara Ogawa's feature film debut as director. A novel of the same name, including four additional short stories, was written by Ogawa and published by Poplar Publishing Co., LTD on June 10, 2021.

== Reception ==
The film was screened at the 15th Japan Cuts film festival in the United States. After premiering at the Jeonju International Film Festival, it was chosen as part of Japan's Official Competition Selection at the Far East Film Festival in Udine, Italy.
