= Sweet Sweat =

- Film poster
- Directed by: Shirō Toyoda
- Screenplay by: Yoko Mizuki
- Story by: Yoko Mizuki
- Produced by: Ichirō Satō; Hideyuki Shiino
- Starring: Machiko Kyō; Keiji Sada; Eitarō Ozawa
- Cinematography: Kozo Okazaki
- Edited by: Chizuru Hirose
- Music by: Hikaru Hayashi
- Production company: Tokyo Eiga
- Distributed by: Toho
- Release date: 19 September 1964 (Japan)
- Running time: 119 minutes
- Country: Japan
- Language: Japanese

Sweet Sweat (Japanese: 甘い汗, Hepburn: Amai ase) is a 1964 Japanese drama film directed by Shirō Toyoda.

== Cast ==
- Machiko Kyō
- Keiji Sada
- Eitarō Ozawa
- Akira Nagoya
- Miyuki Kuwano

== Release ==
Sweet Sweat was released in Japan by Toho on 19 September 1964, shortly after the death of co-star Keiji Sada. It was released in the United States by Toho International with English subtitles in September 1965. This version had a 120 minute running time.

== Awards ==
Kinema Junpo awarded Machiko Kyō as Best Actress and Yōko Mizuki for Best Screenplay for this film and Kwaidan. Kyō also won the award for Best Actress at the Mainichi Film Concours for her work in the film.
