= Kiku to Isamu =

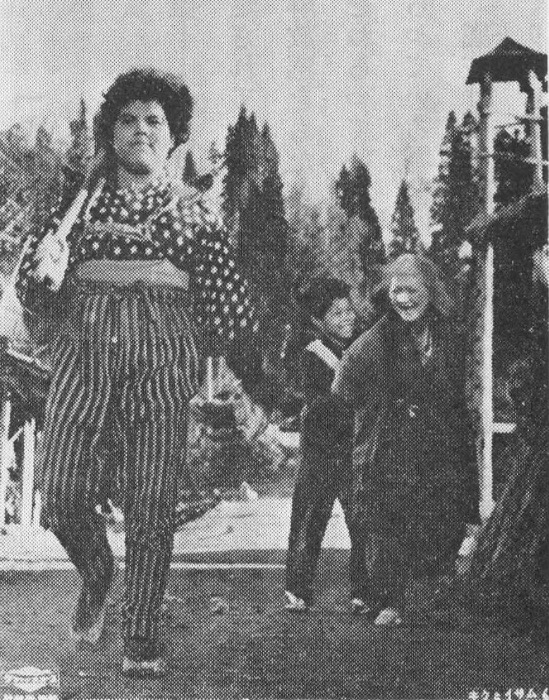
- Scene from the film

Japanese name
- Kanji: キクとイサム
- Directed by: Tadashi Imai
- Written by: Yoko Mizuki
- Produced by: Takerō Itō; Kiichi Ichikawa
- Starring: Tanie Kitabayashi
- Cinematography: Shunichirō Nakao
- Edited by: Akikazu Kono
- Music by: Masao Ōki
- Distributed by: Shochiku
- Release date: March 29, 1959 (Japan)
- Running time: 117 minutes
- Country: Japan
- Language: Japanese

Kiku and Isamu (Japanese: キクとイサム, Hepburn: Kiku to Isamu), also known as Kiku and Isamu: Two Siblings Born in Japan, is a 1959 Japanese drama film directed by Tadashi Imai which addresses the subject of children from interracial relationships.

== Cast ==
- Emiko Takahashi
- George Okunoyama
- Tanie Kitabayashi
- Kōji Mitsui
- Osamu Takizawa
- Rentarō Mikuni
- Seiji Miyaguchi
- Eijirō Tōno
- Masao Oda
- Masao Mishima
- Teruko Nagaoka

== Awards and nominations ==
10th Blue Ribbon Awards

- Won: Best Film
- Won: Best Actress - Tanie Kitabayashi
- Won: Best Screenplay - Youko Mizuki
