= Bushido, Samurai Saga =

1963 film

- Film poster
- Directed by: Tadashi Imai
- Written by: Norio Nanjo; Naoyuki Suzuki; Yoshikata Yoda
- Produced by: Hiroshi Okawa
- Starring: Kinnosuke Nakamura
- Cinematography: Makoto Tsuboi
- Edited by: Shintaro Miyamoto
- Music by: Toshiro Mayuzumi
- Production company: Toei
- Distributed by: Toei
- Release date: 28 April 1963
- Running time: 122 minutes
- Country: Japan
- Language: Japanese

Bushido, Samurai Saga (武士道残酷物語, Bushidō zankoku monogatari), also titled Bushido: The Cruel Code of the Samurai and Cruel Tales of Bushido, is a 1963 Japanese drama and jidaigeki film directed by Tadashi Imai. It was entered into the 13th Berlin International Film Festival where it won the Golden Bear. It continues to receive critical acclaim, often considered one of the better samurai pictures ever filmed.

== Plot ==
The story covers seven generations of a family, from the beginning of the Tokugawa shogunate to the early 1960s, and the extremes its members take out of devotion and unswerving loyalty to lord, country or company, at the cost of their lives and those of close relatives. Susumu, the last in line of male heirs, finally decides against this stance after his fiancée's suicide attempt.

== Cast ==
- Kinnosuke Nakamura as Jirozaemon / Iikura / Sajiemon / Kyutaro / Shuzo / Shingo / Osamu / Susumu
- Eijirō Tōno as Shibiku-Shosuke Hori
- Kyōko Kishida as Lady Hagi
- Masayuki Mori as Lord Tambanokami Munemasa Hori
- Shinjirō Ehara as Shibiku-Shosuke Yasutaka Hori
- Takeshi Katō
- Yoshiko Mita as Kyoko Hitomi
- Ineko Arima as Maki, Shuzo's wife
- Isao Kimura as Hirotaro Iguchi (as Ko Kimura)
- Michiko Araki as Shigeno, Kyutaro's mother
- Emiko Azuma as Hori Tamba's wife
- Yoshi Katō as Takahiro Hori
- Choichiro Kawarazaki as Young man at village
- Kikko Matsuoka as Sato, Shuzo's daughter
- Kō Nishimura as Yamaoka
- Masao Oda as Gohei
- Ryosuke Kagawa as Kōzuki Genza
- Satomi Oka as Fuji
- Nobuo Kawai as Shimoda
- Kei Satō as Saburobei Konoe
- Misako Watanabe as Yasu, Sajiemon's wife
- Kei Yamamoto as Kazuma Noda
- Eijirō Yanagi as Gonnosuke Shizuta
