= Norio Nanjo =

Japanese novelist

南條 範夫(Nanjō Norio)
- 南條 範夫
- Born: Koga Hidemasa; November 14, 1908; Kyōbashi, Tokyo City,
- Died: October 30, 2004 (aged 95)
- Education: Tokyo Imperial University
- Occupations: Novelist, Economist
- Writing career
- Pen name: 南条 道之介
- Language: Japanese
- Years active: 1950–2004
- Period: 1950–2004
- Genres: Historical novels, period novels
- Notable awards: Naoki Prize (1956); Order of the Sacred Treasure, Gold Rays with Neck Ribbon (1982)

Norio Nanjo (南條 範夫; November 14, 1908 – October 30, 2004), born Koga Hidemasa, was a Japanese novelist and economist. Over the course of his life he authored numerous period novels and short stories. He was awarded Naoki Prize in 1956 for his work Toudaiki.

His works played an influential role in the development of the zankoku monogatari subgenre of films.
