= Rice (1957 film) =

1957 film

- Poster
- Directed by: Tadashi Imai
- Written by: Yasutarō Yagi
- Produced by: Nobusaburō Honda; Mitsuo Makino; Seiichi Yoshino
- Starring: Shinjirō Ehara
- Cinematography: Shunichirō Nakao
- Edited by: Yoshiki Nagasama
- Music by: Yasushi Akutagawa
- Production company: Toei
- Release date: 4 March 1957 (Japan)
- Running time: 118 minutes
- Country: Japan
- Language: Japanese

Rice (Japanese: 米, Hepburn: Kome) is a 1957 Japanese drama film directed by Tadashi Imai. It was entered into the 10th Cannes Film Festival.

It is also known by the title The Rice People.

== Plot ==
Two young men, Tsuguo and Senkichi, return to their small home town during the rice planting festival, and try to make a living as fishermen.

== Cast ==
- Shinjirō Ehara as Tsuguo Tamura (田村次男 Tamura Tsuguo)
- Eijirō Tōno as Sakuzō
- Yūko Mochizuki as Yone Yasuda (安田よね Yasuda Yone)
- Masako Nakamura (中村雅子 Nakamura Masako) as Chiyo Yasuda (安田千代 Yasuda Chiyo)
- Izumi Hara as Ume Tamura (田村うめ Tamura Ume)
- Yoshi Katō as Takezō Yasuda (安田竹造 Yasuda Takezō)
- Isao Kimura (a.k.a. Koh Kimura) as Senkichi (仙吉)
- Hitomi Nakahara as Yoshino Tamura (田村よしの Tamura Yoshino)
- Toshiko Okada (岡田敏子 Okada Toshiko)
- Junkichi Orimoto as Fisherman
- Isao Yamagata as Matsunosuke Ōta (太田松之助 Ōta Matsunosuke)

== Production ==
Eastman Color was used for the photography, which Viola Swisher of the Los Angeles Mirror described as having more prominence than the storyline.

== Awards ==
1957 Blue Ribbon Awards for Best Film, Best Director and Best Actress Yūko Mochizuki.

== Reception ==
According to Swisher, with the exception of a "poignant" ending, the "coherence in direction and editing" was subpar "[b]y Western standards".

Pat King of the San Francisco Examiner praised the "superb" photographic work and the "real" scenery, though she argued American viewers at the time would have found difficulties with how the film jumps between themes.

Monte Ito of The Honolulu Advertiser wrote that the film may cause some viewers to perceive it as boring while other viewers may like the realism.
