= Night School (1956 film) =

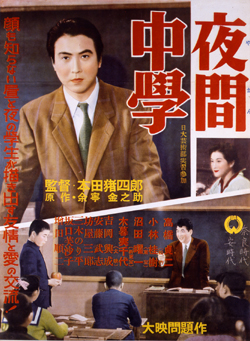
- Original Japanese movie poster
- Directed by: Ishirō Honda
- Screenplay by: Yoko Mizuki
- Produced by: Ginsaku Ashida
- Starring: Okinari Yoshioka; Michiyo Kogure; Katsuyuki Nomura; Takeshi Ando
- Cinematography: Minoru Maeda
- Music by: Mitsuo Katô
- Production company: Nihon University College of Art
- Distributed by: Daiei Film
- Release date: 18 April 1956 (Japan)
- Running time: 44 minutes
- Country: Japan
- Language: Japanese

Night School (Japanese: 夜間中学, Hepburn: Yakan chūgaku) is a 1956 Japanese film directed by Ishirō Honda.

== Cast ==
- Okinari Yoshioka as Senta
- Michiyo Kogure as Senta's mother
- Katsuyuki Nomura as Senta's younger brother
- Takeshi Ando as Ryohei
- Jūkichi Uno as Ryohei's father
- Mitsue Hino as Ryohei's mother
- Teiji Takahashi as Daytime Teacher
- Keiju Kobayashi as Nighttime Teacher
- Norihei Miki as a train passenger
- Saburo Boya as a train passenger
- Yutaka Nakayama as a train passenger

== Production ==
Night School was director Ishirō Honda's only film ever directed outside of Toho. The film was among the first about the topic of night schools. The original idea for developing a film around night schools was from Kanesaku Toda, a Toho staff member who approached Honda and other ex-Nichidai men. The team got the rights to the short story by Teiji Seta titled "Mail Desk" (Yubin zukue) which appeared in the children's magazine Boys and Girls. Among the crew was Yoko Mizuki as the screenwriter, and other Nichidai grads including Keiju Kobayashi and Jukichi Uno who starred as a teacher and a student's father. The film was produced by Nihon University College of Art with a low budget. Most actors on set worked without pay.

Honda and the film's producers submitted Night School to the Japanese government's education department, hoping to secure a seal of approval to get the film approved for families and students. The government advised Honda to change the title due to a stigma surrounding night schools, which Honda declined leading the funding being denied.

== Release ==
Night School was acquired by Daiei Film and distributed as a second feature on April 18, 1956.

The film was not screened for decades. It was revived at the 2009 Yamagata International Documentary Film Festival retrospective titled "The Man Who Shot Godzilla". Following the screening, a panel discussion was held with Shusuke Kaneko and Honda's son Ryuji.
