= Night Drum =

1958 Japanese film

- Theatrical release poster

Japanese name
- Kanji: 夜の鼓
- Directed by: Tadashi Imai
- Written by: Kaneto Shindō; Shinobu Hashimoto; Monzaemon Chikamatsu (play)
- Produced by: Tengo Yamada
- Starring: Rentarō Mikuni; Ineko Arima; Masayuki Mori
- Cinematography: Shun'ichirō Nakao
- Edited by: Akikazu Kōno
- Music by: Akira Ifukube
- Production company: Gendai Production
- Distributed by: Shochiku
- Release date: 15 April 1958 (Japan)
- Running time: 95 minutes
- Country: Japan
- Language: Japanese

Night Drum a.k.a. The Adulteress (Japanese: 夜の鼓, Hepburn: Yoru no tsuzumi) is a 1958 Japanese historical drama film directed by Tadashi Imai. It was written by Kaneto Shindō and Shinobu Hashimoto, based on the 1706 play Horikawa nami no tsuzumi by Monzaemon Chikamatsu. Film historians regard Night Drum as one of director Imai's major works.

== Plot ==
Samurai Hikokuro returns home to his wife Tane after a full year at his shogun's residence in Edo. Rumours have it that Tane committed adultery with a musician in his absence, so the family clan summons for an interrogation. In a series of flashbacks, Tane is first cleared from the charges pressed against her, but after Hikokuro's sister renews the accusations, she finally admits her guilt. In her confession, she recounts how she had first escaped a rape attempt by the very samurai responsible for the rumours about her and, being drunk and in fear, had later spent the night with the musician. In compliance with the samurai honour, Tane is required to commit suicide, and her lover declared fair game. Although Hikokuro has forgiven his wife whom he still loves, he first kills her as she is unable to do so herself, and then the adulterer.

== Cast ==
- Rentarō Mikuni as Hikokuro
- Ineko Arima as Tane
- Masayuki Mori as Miyaji, the musician
- Sumiko Hidaka
- Keiko Yukishiro
- Tomoko Naraoka
- Emiko Azuma
- Kikue Mōri
- Taiji Tonoyama
- Ichirō Sugai

== Legacy ==
Night Drum was screened at the Berkeley Art Museum and Pacific Film Archive in 1985 and at the Museum of Modern Art in 2022 as part of its "Beyond Ozu: Hidden Gems of Shochiku Studios" retrospective.
