= Until We Meet Again (1950 film) =

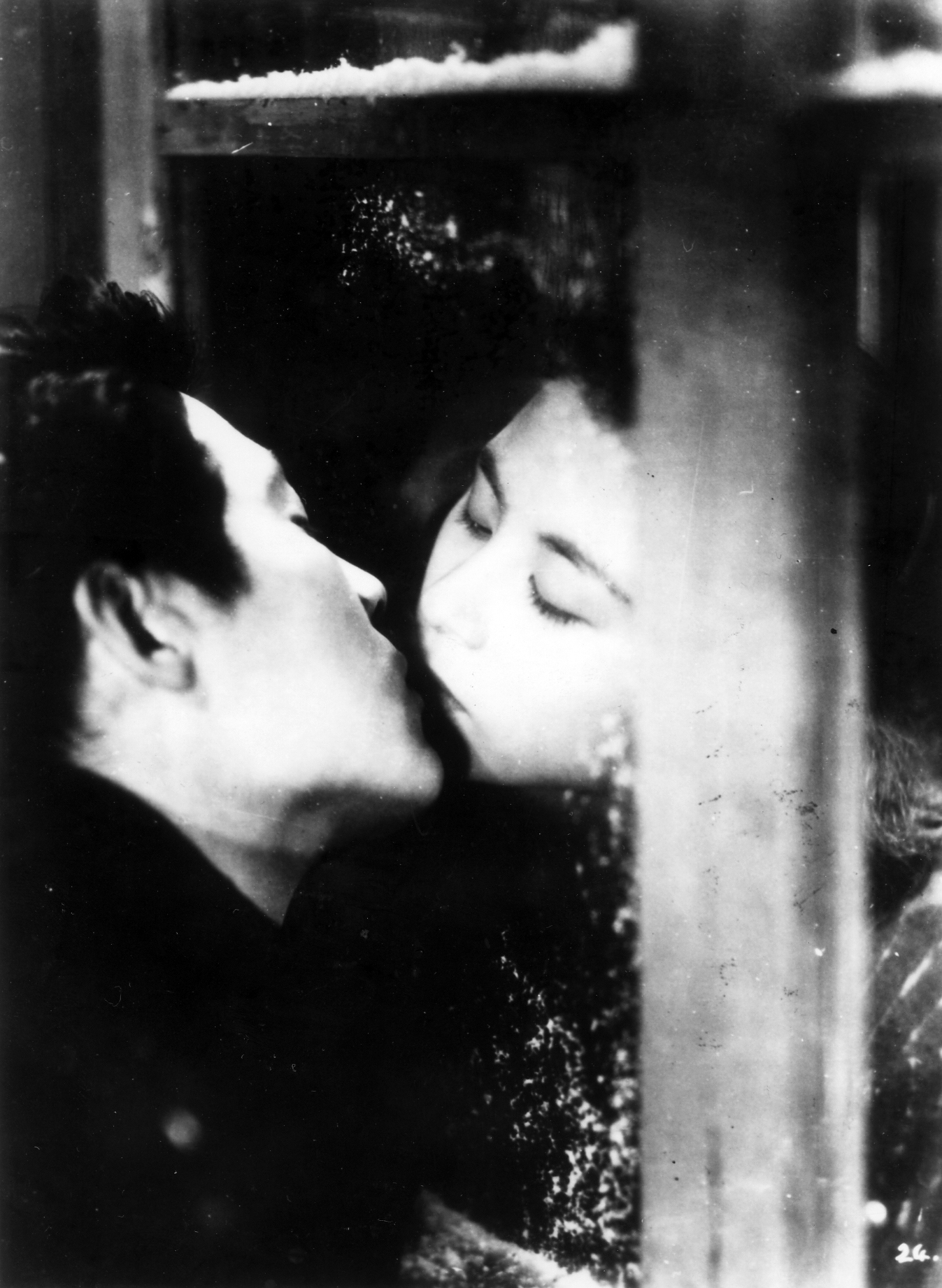
- Yoshiko Kuga and Eiji Okada; in Until We Meet Again
- Directed by: Tadashi Imai
- Written by: Yoko Mizuki; Toshio Yasumi; Romain Rolland (novel)
- Produced by: Shizuo Sakagami
- Starring: Eiji Okada; Yoshiko Kuga
- Cinematography: Shunichirō Nakao
- Edited by: Yaeko Katō; Yoshiki Nagasawa
- Music by: Masao Ōki
- Production company: Toho
- Distributed by: Toho
- Release date: March 21, 1950
- Running time: 111 minutes
- Country: Japan
- Language: Japanese

Until We Meet Again (Japanese: また逢う日まで, Hepburn: Mata au hi made) is a 1950 Japanese anti-war drama film directed by Tadashi Imai. It is based on Romain Rolland's novel Pierre et Luce. The film stars Eiji Okada in the role of Tajima Saburo opposite to Yoshiko Kuga as Ono Keiko.

== Plot ==
Tajima Saburo is a pacifist and amateur poet in World War II era Japan - a trait which causes conflict between him and his family. His eldest brother, Ichiro, was killed in the war leaving behind his pregnant wife, Masako, who now lives with the Tajima family. His other older brother, Jiro, has already followed suit to join the war much to Saburo's dismay. This leaves Saburo the black sheep of the family as Jiro and his father show their disappointment at his lack of patriotism. During one fateful bomb drill, Saburo spots a woman in the shelter, Ono Keiko, and protects her from the sounds of shelling from outside. Their hands briefly touch during this moment, and Keiko is forever imprinted on Saburo's mind. Once the shelter is cleared, Saburo loses track of Keiko and decides to head home, defeated.

At home, Saburo attempts to avoid seeing Jiro and his father, resulting in him being berated for his filial disrespect. Fleeing upstairs to his bedroom to avoid further conflict, Jiro follows suit in the hopes he can convince Saburo to join the army voluntarily. His drunken attempts fail and more arguing ensues. The following morning Saburo meets with his school friends to discuss publishing a poetry book based on the posthumous works of their recently deceased acquaintance, Kawabe. It becomes Saburo's job to meet Kawabe's brother in Tokyo at Hakuyosha to discuss the details. There, Saburo approaches Hakuyosha and spots children playing as soldiers outside. Realizing the game they are playing, he begins to laugh and realizes none other than Keiko is nearby, laughing along with him. They recognize each other immediately. By coincidence, Keiko was helping out at the same business Kawabe's brother works at as an advertisement painter/designer.

Together Saburo and Keiko sit by a small pond to discuss anything but the war, sharing caramel candies and an apple. Saburo is interested in Keiko's paintings, but she insists she only does it to earn a wage and that she doesn't actually feel as though she's good at it - though this doesn't seem to bother her, so long as she gets paid. They agree again to meet the next day and Saburo suggests they go to the nearby museum, but abruptly changes his mind, instead suggesting they look at her paintings together. In a shocking turn of events, Saburo admits he actually dislikes her illustrations to which she responds nonchalantly, claiming it only matters if the publishers buy it. It's during their conversation Saburo realizes Keiko is quite poor, having holes in her shoes and gloves. The topic of discussion becomes existential, as Keiko laments having to eat, wear clothes, and work in order to be human.

Saburo joins Keiko on her search for publishing companies that will hire her, though most appear to be uninterested in her work. Finally, at Akatsuki Studio, the owner agrees to pay her for her poster - though he refers to it as amateurish - but he insists he will only pay her if she makes changes to it by the following morning and will only pay her at the end of the month. This enrages Saburo as he feels Keiko is being taken advantage of, but Keiko asks him to let it go for her sake. Once more they sit by the pond they reunited at and though they try to avoid discussing the war, Keiko insists Saburo tell her when he's going to be forcibly enlisted. He reveals that his enlistment is only six months away, and nearby, Jiro has spotted Saburo sitting with Keiko in the park. On the walk to the tram stop, Saburo offers to buy Keiko a new pair of gloves. Keiko refuses saying she does not take handouts. He agrees to this condition, saying he will buy them for her in exchange for a portrait painted by her. At first she thinks he's joking, but eventually agrees to meet him at 2 o'clock the following Tuesday to paint him at her home.

Later, Jiro confronts Saburo in his room once more calling him irresponsible for involving Keiko in his life when he knows he’ll be leaving soon to become a soldier. This argument shakes Saburo, and he arrives at Keiko's for the portrait painting with the understanding he must end their relationship. Once they take a break from painting, Saburo tells Keiko he cannot make her happy, and it is best for him to leave before he makes things worse for her. Keiko insists he’s making the wrong decision and through her tears, Saburo realizes he has to make the most of their time together as either of them could die during the war. Before he leaves, he looks back at her through the window of her home, and kisses her through the glass.

Back at home, tensions are high between his friends and only made worse when he receives news that Jiro has been struck by a supply train and is now on his deathbed. Jiro has sent for Saburo and their father, though only Saburo arrives. On his deathbed, Jiro reconciles with Saburo. He continues to see Keiko, but now finds himself living obliviously to the war. With naive confidence they both leave a bomb shelter too early and are narrowly missed by a nearby explosion, killing a man they had passed by earlier instead. They kiss for the first time in the corner they are huddled in, and Saburo asks her to marry him. Keiko agrees.

The call-outs have begun being sent to Saburo and his friends, and they drink together as well as bicker amongst each other in frustration. In the days following, Saburo arrives to let Keiko know he’s received his call-up and he will be leaving in two days time. He tells her that they can get married when he returns, and they begin to imagine their married life together. The following day, Saburo is notified he’s being mobilized that night instead of the following morning - and more than this his plans with Keiko have been interrupted by Masako collapsing in the street due to a miscarriage. He cannot leave Masako’s side, as he promised Jiro he would take care of their family after he passed. Masako insists he go, as there is nothing to be done for her, but he refuses.

At the station, Keiko continues to wait for Saburo - sealing her fate as a bomb is dropped on the train station and kills her in the blast. That night, Saburo waits outside of Keiko’s home in the hopes he can explain himself when she arrives - though she never does. He leaves behind a note of apology, hoping she will meet him at the train station as he leaves for the warfront. Instead, her mother receives the note but she does not make it to the train station in time. Saburo leaves for the war, never knowing that Keiko has perished. Much later, Keiko’s mother and Saburo’s father receive notice that Saburo has also perished on the warfront, and together they mourn the loss of their children over the portrait that Keiko painted of Saburo.

== Cast ==
- Yoshiko Kuga as Ono Keiko
- Eiji Okada as Tajima Saburo
- Osamu Takizawa as Tajima Eisaku
- Akitake Kōno as Tajima Jiro
- Akiko Kazami as Masako
- Haruko Sugimura as Ono Suga
- Hayashi Koichi as Saburo's friend
- Hiroshi Akutagawa as Saburo's friend
- Akira Ōizumi as Saburo's friend
- Hiroshi Kondō as Saburo's friend
- Yoshie Minami as Mrs. Taketori

== Awards ==
In 1999, the film was ranked 30th in the list of "All-Time Best 100 Japanese Movies" by Kinema Junpo. In 2009, the film was ranked 36th in the publication's list of the 200 best Japanese films of all time.

Blue Ribbon Awards

- Best Film
- Best Director: Tadashi Imai

Kinema Junpo Awards

- Best Film

Mainichi Film Awards

- Best Film

Motion Picture and Television Engineering Society of Japan Awards

- Best Cinematography: Shunichirō Nakao
