= Kyōbashi, Tokyo =

Town located in Chūō-ku, Tokyo

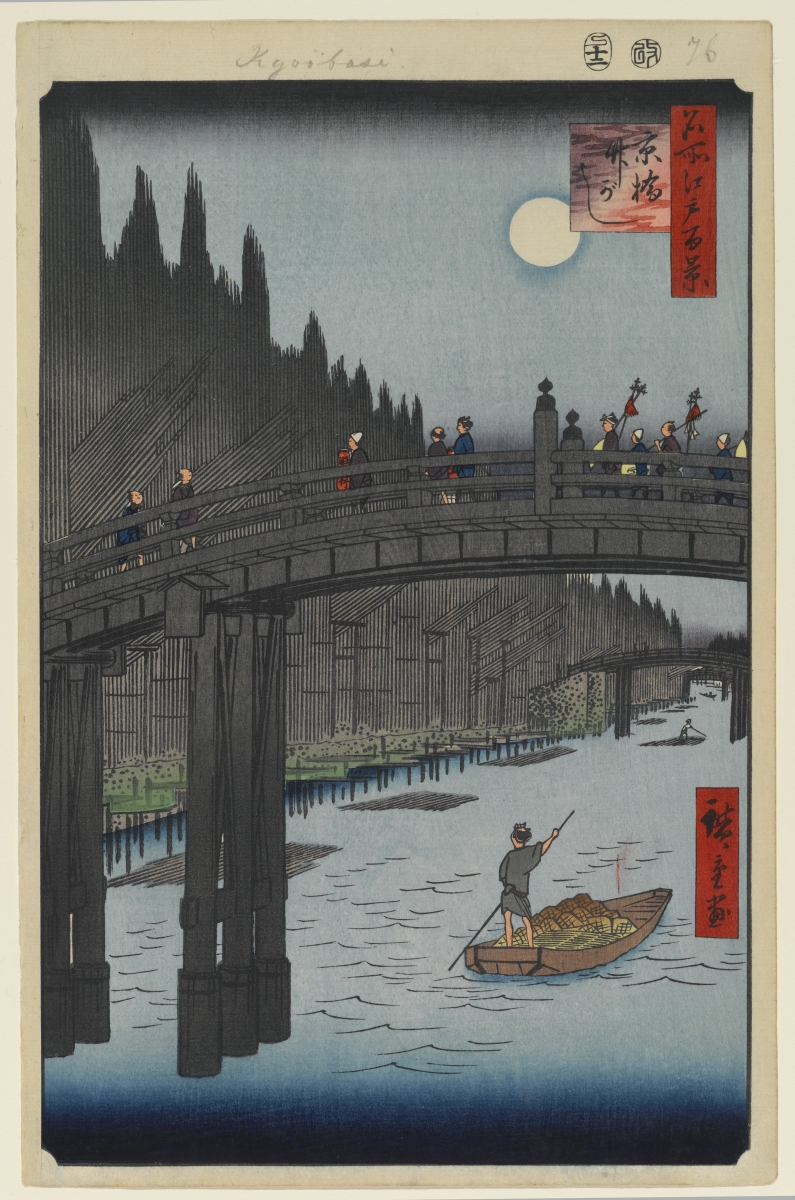
"Bamboo Quay by Kyōbashi Bridge" from the "One Hundred Famous Views of Edo" by Hiroshige - Brooklyn Museum

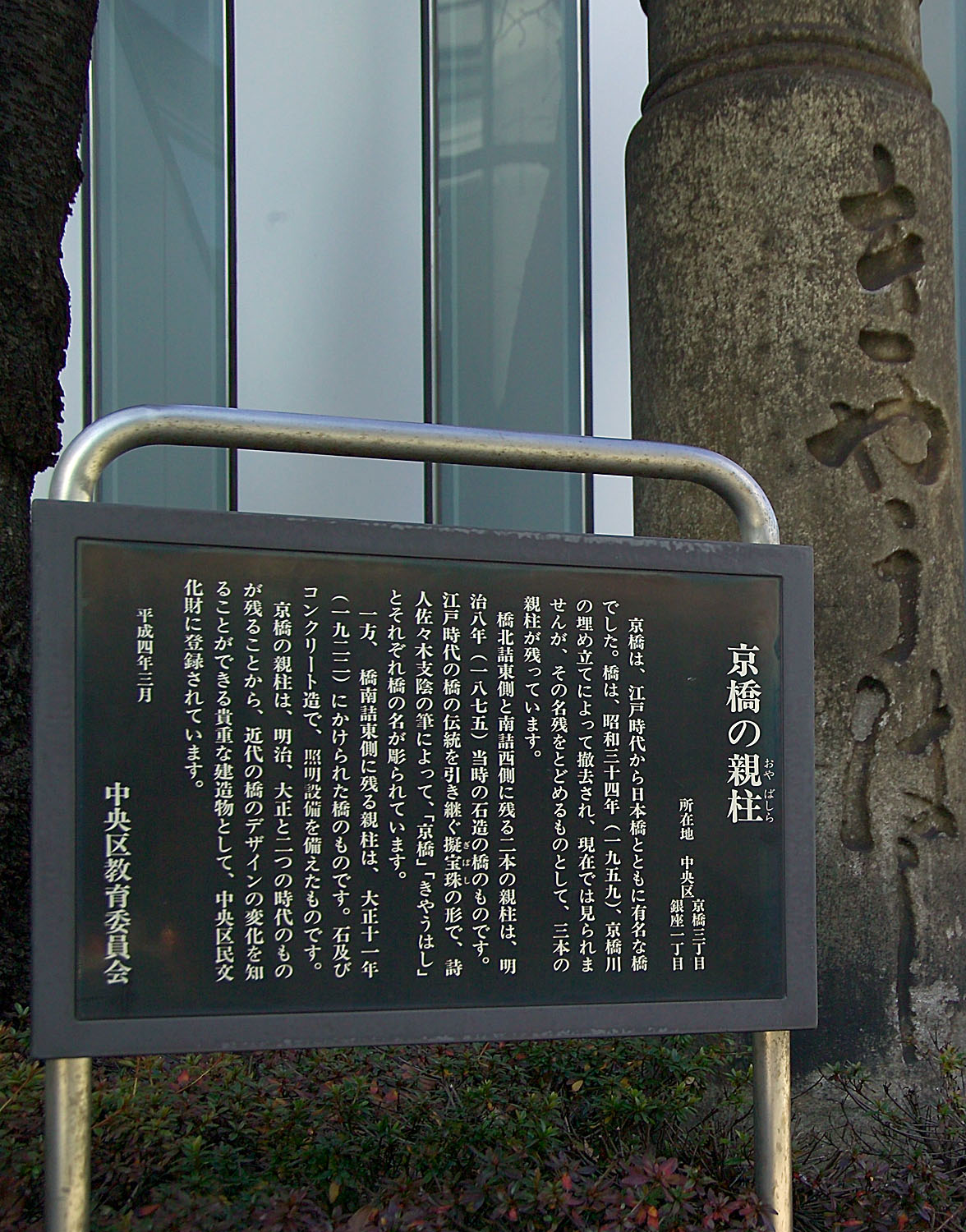
Kyōbashi no Oyabashira is a pillar which is the only remnant of the old Kyōbashi (bridge) in Tokyo.(35°40′30.64″N 139°46′9.46″E)

Kyōbashi (京橋; Japanese pronunciation: [kʲoː.ba.ɕi] (Note: The bridge's name and placename in Tokyo is pronounced like this. The bridge's name and placename in Osaka is pronounced [kʲoꜜː.ba.ɕi].)) is a neighborhood east of Tokyo Station in Chūō, Tokyo, Japan. It is one of the city's oldest commercial districts, although it has since been eclipsed by Ginza to the south and Nihonbashi to the north. Kyobashi, together with Nihonbashi and Kanda, is the core of Shitamachi, the original downtown center of Edo-Tokyo, before the rise of newer secondary centers such as Shinjuku and Shibuya.

== History ==
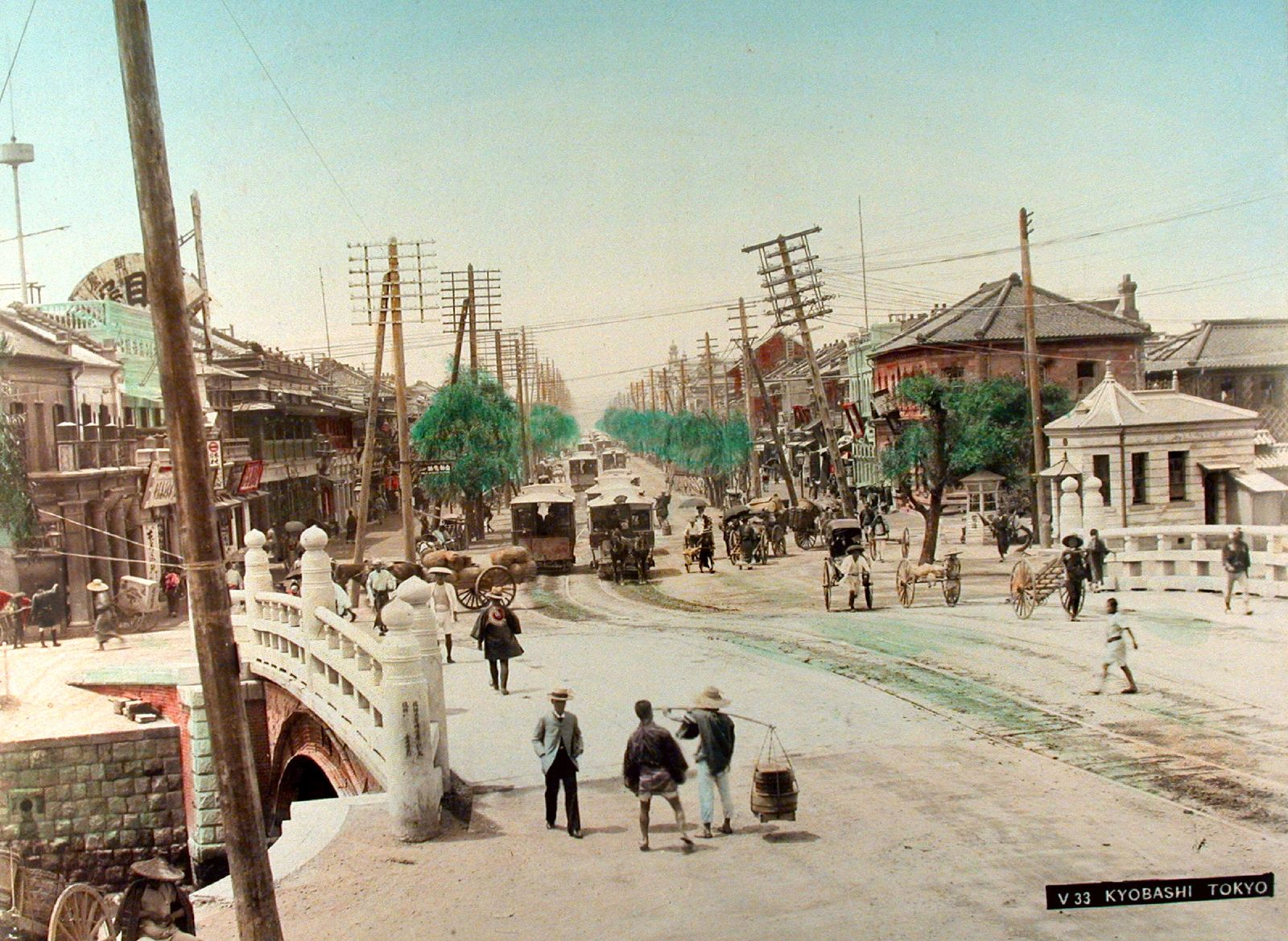
A view of Kyobashi and Ginza avenue in Tokyo, c1890

Its name comes from the bridge that once spanned the Kyōbashi Canal. The south side of the canal was called Takegashi (竹河岸 Bamboo Quay) because it was bamboo wholesalers' area.

The Kyōbashi, or Capital Bridge, linked the Ginza and the Kyōbashi neighborhood. According to the sign erected at the site by the Chuo-ku Board of Education, together with Nihonbashi, it was one of the famous bridges of Edo. When the canal was filled in 1959, the bridge was removed. Today, a pillar stands to mark the site of the old bridge.

Kyobashi was also a ward of Tokyo City, encompassing 16 neighborhoods, including Ginza, Tsukiji, and Tsukishima, in addition to Kyobashi itself. In 1947, when the 35 wards of Tokyo were reorganized into 23, it was merged with Nihonbashi to form the modern Chuo ward.

== Transportation ==
Kyōbashi and Takarachō stations provide subway service.

== Corporate tenants ==
Meidi-Ya, an upscale grocery store chain, has its headquarters in this area.

== Education ==
Public elementary and junior high schools are operated by Chuo City Board of Education. The zoned schools are Joto Elementary School (中央区立城東小学校) and Ginza Junior High School (中央区立銀座中学校)

== Notable people ==
- Ryūnosuke Akutagawa, the "father of the modern Japanese short-story", was born here.
- Norio Nanjo, the Japanese novelist was also born here.
