= Jun'ai Monogatari =

1957 film

- Japanese poster
- Directed by: Tadashi Imai
- Written by: Yōko Mizuki
- Produced by: Hiroshi Okawa
- Starring: Shinjirō Ehara
- Cinematography: Shunichiro Nakao
- Edited by: Yoshiki Nagasama
- Release date: 15 October 1957
- Running time: 133 minutes
- Country: Japan
- Language: Japanese

Jun'ai Monogatari (純愛物語; A Story of Pure Love) is a 1957 Japanese film directed by Tadashi Imai. It was entered into the 8th Berlin International Film Festival where Imai won the Silver Bear for Best Director.

== Cast ==
- Shinjirō Ehara as Kantaro Hayakawa
- Hitomi Nakahara
- Eiji Okada
- Isao Kimura
- Yoshi Katō
- Seiji Miyaguchi
- Eijirō Tōno
- Toshiko Kobayashi
- Michiko Araki
- Teruko Kishi
- Junkichi Orimoto as Detective
- Teruko Nagaoka
