= Tadashi Imai =

Japanese film director (1912–1991)

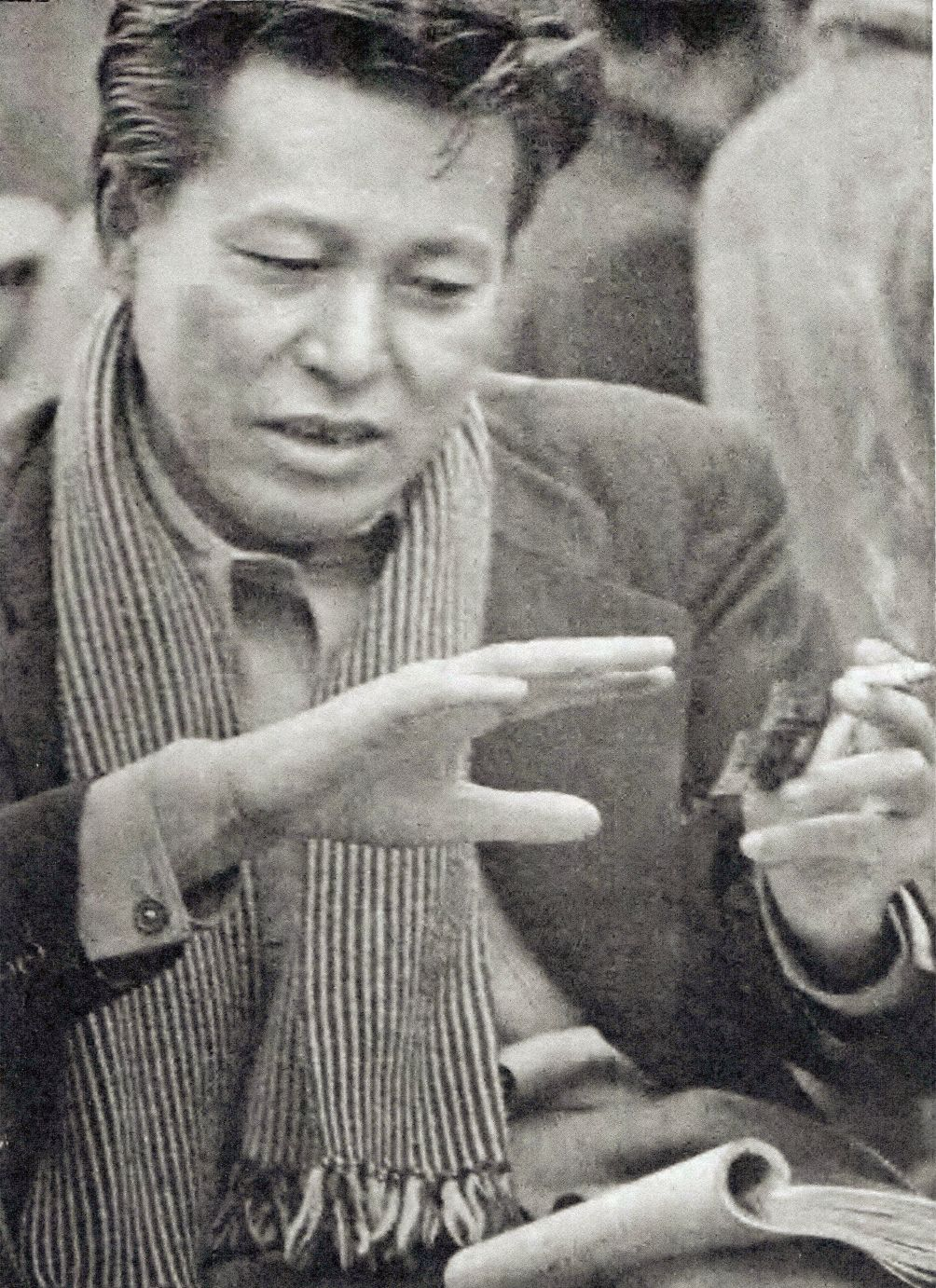
- Tadashi Imai in the April 1953 issue of Asahi Camera
- Born: January 8, 1912; Shibuya, Tokyo, Japan
- Died: November 22, 1991 (aged 79); Sōka, Japan
- Occupation: Film director
- Years active: 1939–1991

Tadashi Imai (今井正, Imai Tadashi; January 8, 1912 – November 22, 1991) was a Japanese film director known for social realist filmmaking informed by a left-wing perspective. His most noted films include An Inlet of Muddy Water (1953) and Bushido, Samurai Saga (1963).

== Life ==
Although leaning towards left-wing politics already at Tokyo University, where he joined a Communist student group, Imai's directing career, after serving as continuity writer at J.O. studios (later Toho), started in 1939 with a series of films promoting the war efforts of the militarist regime. Later calling these films "the biggest mistake of my life", he soon turned to socially conscious themes after the war. Aoi sanmyaku (1949), although a light comedy, observed the educational system, and was successful both with moviegoers and critics. While his 1950 drama Until We Meet Again portrayed a young couple's doomed love against the backdrop of the Pacific War, the 1953 anti-war film Tower of Lilies was a stark account of untrained female students forced into aiding military troops during the final stage of the Battle of Okinawa. Other films addressed the present-day struggles of day labourers (And Yet We Live), troubled youths (Jun'ai monogatari), poor farmers (The Rice People) and children of interracial relationships (Kiku to Isamu). Yet the films regarded his most important of this era had a historical instead of a contemporary setting: An Inlet of Muddy Water (1953), based on stories by Ichiyō Higuchi, took a look at the fate of a group of women during the Meiji era, Night Drum (1958), scripted by Kaneto Shindo, denounced the Samurai honour codex in a tale about adultery and revenge during the Edo period. Imai returned to the latter subject in the critically acclaimed Bushido, Samurai Saga (1963) and in Revenge (1964).

== Legacy ==
Japanese critics tended to define Imai's way of storytelling as "nakanai realism", a "realism without tears", a fact questioned by film historian Joan Mellen who saw his work repeatedly "close to the sentimental". In an interview, Imai himself summed up his films as "centered on human tragedies", which locates them close to the works of Keisuke Kinoshita who addressed similar topics (though in a less political manner) and whom Imai admired. While film historians acknowledge Imai's solid directorial skills, the lack of a consistent style, and tendency to focus more on consequences than analysis of his themes, have been recurring subjects of criticism.

== Selected filmography ==
- 1941: The Ecology of Marriage (Kekkon no seitai)
- 1946: An Enemy of the People (Minshū no Teki)
- 1949: Aoi sanmyaku
- 1950: Until We Meet Again (Mata au hi made)
- 1951: And Yet We Live (Dokkoi ikiteru)
- 1953: Tower of Lilies (Himeyuri no tō)
- 1953: An Inlet of Muddy Water (Nigorie)
- 1956: Mahiru no ankoku
- 1957: Jun'ai monogatari
- 1957: The Rice People (Kome)
- 1958: Night Drum (Yoru no tsuzumi)
- 1959: Kiku to Isamu
- 1963: Bushido, Samurai Saga (Bushidō zankoku monogatari)
- 1964: Revenge (Adauchi)
- 1967: Satōgashi ga kowareru toki
- 1968: The Time of Reckoning (Fushin no toki)
- 1976: Brother and Sister (Ani imōto)
- 1981: Yuki

== Awards ==
Imai received the Kinema Junpo Award for Best Director for Mahiru no ankoku, The Rice People and Kiku to Isamu. All three films plus Until We Meet Again and An Inlet of Muddy Water were also awarded Best Film.

Year of award	Name of Award	Awarding organization	Country of origin	Film title (if applicable)
1946	Best Director	Mainichi Film Awards	Japan	Minshū no Teki
1950	Best Film	Blue Ribbon Awards	Japan	Until We Meet Again
1950	Best Director	Blue Ribbon Awards	Japan	Until We Meet Again
1950	Best Film	Mainichi Film Awards	Japan	Until We Meet Again
1953	Best Film	Blue Ribbon Awards	Japan	An Inlet of Muddy Water
1953	Best Director	Blue Ribbon Awards	Japan	An Inlet of Muddy Water; Tower of Lilies
1953	Best Film	Mainichi Film Awards	Japan	An Inlet of Muddy Water
1953	Best Director	Mainichi Film Awards	Japan	An Inlet of Muddy Water
1956	Best Film	Blue Ribbon Awards	Japan	Mahiru no ankoku
1956	Best Director	Blue Ribbon Awards	Japan	Mahiru no ankoku
1956	Best Film	Mainichi Film Awards	Japan	Mahiru no ankoku
1956	Best Director	Mainichi Film Awards	Japan	Mahiru no ankoku
1957	Best Film	Blue Ribbon Awards	Japan	Rice
1957	Best Director	Blue Ribbon Awards	Japan	Jun'ai monogatari; Rice
1957	Best Film	Mainichi Film Awards	Japan	Rice
1957	Best Director	Mainichi Film Awards	Japan	Jun'ai monogatari; Rice
1958	Best Director	Berlin International Film Festival	Germany	Jun'ai monogatari
1959	Best Film	Blue Ribbon Awards	Japan	Kiku to Isamu
1959	Best Film	Mainichi Film Awards	Japan	Kiku to Isamu
1963	Golden Bear	Berlin International Film Festival	Germany	Bushido, Samurai Saga
1991	Special Award	Mainichi Film Awards	Japan	
