= Zatoichi Goes to the Fire Festival =

- Directed by: Kenji Misumi
- Screenplay by: Shintaro Katsu; Takayuki Yamada
- Story by: Kan Shimosawa
- Produced by: Shintaro Katsu
- Starring: Shintaro Katsu; Tatsuya Nakadai; Reiko Ōhara; Masayuki Mori
- Cinematography: Kazuo Miyagawa
- Edited by: Toshio Taniguchi
- Music by: Isao Tomita
- Production companies: Katsu; Daiei Film
- Distributed by: Dainichi Eihai
- Release date: 12 August 1970 (Japan)
- Running time: 95 minutes
- Country: Japan

Zatoichi Goes to the Fire Festival (座頭市あばれ火祭り) is a 1970 Japanese Chambara film directed by Kenji Misumi and starring Shintaro Katsu, who also produced and co-wrote the script. It is the twenty-first of a series of films featuring the blind swordsman Zatoichi. The protagonist, who works as a masseur during the late Edo period (1830s and 1840s), was created by novelist Kan Shimozawa.

Zatoichi Goes to the Fire Festival was the last film in the original saga of Zatoichi (1962–1989) directed by Misumi, who had also directed the first film of the series, and several others as well.

== Synopsis ==
During his wanderings, Zatoichi comes across a group connected with an infamous Yakuza boss, known as "Dark Lord" Yamikubo. Yamikubo is blind like Ichi, but he is indeed evil, and rules with an iron fist a great region of lands and towns who pay tribute to him. After Zatoichi tries to help a woman who has been bought at a "mistress auction" organized by one of Yamikubo's henchmen, the Dark Lord uses the beautiful Okiyo, his protégé, as a spy who must seduce and take Ichi's shikomi-zue (cane sword) away. But shortly after meeting him, Okiyo falls in love with Ichi and refuses to carry out her mission. Yamikubo then devises another way of drawing the blind swordsman close and kill him during the famous "Fire Festival", which Zatoichi decides to attend despite the danger involved.

== Cast ==
- Shintaro Katsu ... Zatoichi
- Reiko Ōhara ... Okiyo
- Masayuki Mori ... Dark Lord Yamikubo/Lord Yamikubo
- Tatsuya Nakadai ... Ronin
- Kō Nishimura ... Migi
- Ryūnosuke Kaneda ... Boss Kuroko

== Production ==
- Yoshinobu Nishioka - Art direction

== Release ==
Zatoichi Goes to the Fire Festival was released in Japan on August 12, 1970. The film was followed-up with the sequel Zatoichi Meets His Equal.
