= Zatoichi and the Doomed Man =

Japanese name
- Kanji: 座頭市逆手斬り
Transcriptions
- Revised Hepburn: Zatōichi sakate-giri
- Directed by: Kazuo Mori
- Written by: Shozaburo Asai
- Based on: Zatoichi by Kan Shimozawa
- Produced by: Sadao Zaizen
- Starring: Shintaro Katsu; Sachiko Murase
- Cinematography: Hiroshi Imai
- Edited by: Toshio Taniguchi
- Music by: Seitaro Omori
- Production company: Daiei Studios
- Release date: 18 September 1965 (Japan)
- Running time: 78 minutes
- Country: Japan
- Language: Japanese

Zatoichi and the Doomed Man (座頭市逆手斬り, Zatōichi sakate-giri) is a 1965 Japanese chambara film directed by Kazuo Mori and starring Shintaro Katsu as the blind masseur Zatoichi. It was originally released by the Daiei Motion Picture Company (later acquired by Kadokawa Pictures).

Zatoichi and the Doomed Man is the eleventh episode in the 26-part film series devoted to the character of Zatoichi.

== Plot ==
Zatoichi (Katsu) is given 50 lashes for illegal gambling in Shimokura. While in jail, his cellmate Shimazo (Mizuhara) claims to have been jailed on false charges of housebreaking, arson, and murder, pleading with Ichi to contact one of his influential associates who can vouch for his innocence and to inform his wife and daughter of his situation.

== Cast ==
- Shintaro Katsu as Zatoichi
- Kanbi Fujiyama as Monk Hyakutaro
- Kenjiro Ishiyama as Boss Jubei Araiso
- Masako Akeboshi as Ochiyo
- Eiko Taki as Oyone
- Ryuzo Shimada as Yakuza boss
- Koichi Mizuhara as Shimazo
- Sachiko Murase as Shimazo's wife

== Reception ==
=== Critical response ===
Zatoichi and the Doomed Man currently has three positive reviews, and no negative reviews at Rotten Tomatoes.

Brian McKay, writing for eFilmCritic.com, gave Zatoichi and the Doomed Man three out of five stars and said that "[w]ith the exception of one very funny Zatoichi impersonator, and one or two excellent action sequences, Zatoichi and the Doomed Man is a surprisingly lackluster installment, due to underdeveloped characters and a truncated ending that feels as if someone edited out the film's third act using a dull katana. [...] While I'll still take a mediocre ZATOICHI movie from thirty years ago over a crappy Hollywood film of the present day, this one leaves the viewer with a sense of unfinished business on the narrative side, and rushed work on the production side. Worth seeing for the bright points mentioned above, but overall a forgettable entry to the series."
