= Zatoichi at Large =

- Theatrical release poster
- Directed by: Kazuo Mori
- Screenplay by: Kinya Naoi
- Based on: A novel by Kan Shimozawa
- Produced by: Shintaro Katsu; Kozen Nishioka
- Starring: Shintaro Katsu; Hisaya Morishige; Etsushi Takahashi; Naoko Otani; Rentarō Mikuni; Renji Ishibashi
- Cinematography: Fujio Morita
- Music by: Eiken Sakurai
- Production company: Katsu Production
- Distributed by: Toho
- Release date: 15 January 1972 (Japan)
- Running time: 87 minutes
- Country: Japan

Zatoichi at Large (Japanese: 座頭市御用旅, Hepburn: Zatōichi goyōtabi) is a 1972 Japanese chanbara film directed by Kazuo Mori. The film stars Shintaro Katsu as Zatoichi, a blind swordsman and masseur who helps deliver a baby and transport it to its relatives after its mother dies. It was the 23rd film in the Zatoichi film series and the first distributed by Toho, while all others were distributed by Daiei.

== Release ==
Zatoichi at Large was released in Japan on 15 January 1972 where it was distributed by Toho. It was released in the United States by Toho International with English subtitles in September 1973. The film has been released under alternate titles, including The Blind Swordsman on a Mission. The film was followed by Zatoichi in Desperation.

The film was released on DVD by Animego on 8 June 2004. The film was later released on Blu-ray and DVD by the Criterion Collection as part of their Zatoichi box set.

== Reception ==
In a retrospective review, DVDTalk described the series of films to be tired at this point, noting that the film series was running out of ideas, noting "Ichi's obligatory face-off with a badass swordsman which is almost comically tacked on at the end." The review concluded that "the characters are colorful and despite piling on a few too many twists against Ichi in the finale, his guilt, eventual capture, humiliation, final revenge, and bond with the people he has met make it an enjoyable film in the series."

== Cast ==
- Shintaro Katsu
- Hisaya Morishige
- Etsushi Takahashi
- Naoko Otani
- Rentarō Mikuni
- Renji Ishibashi
