= Zatoichi Meets Yojimbo =

- Theatrical release poster
- Directed by: Kihachi Okamoto
- Written by: Kihachi Okamoto; Tetsuro Yoshida
- Produced by: Shintaro Katsu
- Starring: Shintaro Katsu; Toshiro Mifune; Ayako Wakao
- Cinematography: Kazuo Miyagawa
- Edited by: Toshio Taniguchi
- Music by: Akira Ifukube
- Distributed by: Daiei Film
- Release date: 15 January 1970 (Japan)
- Running time: 115 minutes
- Country: Japan
- Language: Japanese

Zatoichi Meets Yojimbo (Japanese: 座頭市と用心棒) is a 1970 Japanese drama film directed by Kihachi Okamoto.

It is the 20th of a series of films featuring the blind swordsman Zatoichi. The main character is based on a fictional character, a blind masseur and swordmaster. He was created by novelist Kan Shimozawa and set during the late Edo period (1830s and 1840s).

In this film, actor Toshiro Mifune plays a similar character to Sanjuro, the rōnin (masterless samurai) in Akira Kurosawa's famous film Yojimbo (1961). Although Mifune is clearly not playing the same man (his name here is Daisaku Sasa, and his personality and background differ in many key respects), the film's title and some of its content connect him to the character, the Ronin with No Name, and the idea of the two iconic jidaigeki characters confronting each other (Machibuse, made in the same year, also stars Mifune in a role similar to that of Yojimbo).

== Plot ==
In the middle of a rainstorm, Ichi overhears a man being killed by a group and then dragged off into the brush. Tired of wandering, he decides to visit his hometown not noticing until later that the townspeople are living in fear of a local yakuza gang. At a teahouse, he meets Umeno, a former love interest. In the meantime, the boss's eldest son returns from university expecting a large sum of money to be paid to him, but the boss refuses. The youngest son, who also wants the money, hires Yojimbo (Toshiro Mifune) to assassinate him, as he is the boss's top enforcer. Yojimbo, however, is more than happy to bide his time drinking and making him wait.

Eventually, another rōnin armed with a double-barreled pistol wanders into town, wanting the bounty on Zatoichi's head. While Yojimbo makes short work of him, eventually the boy grows tired of his father's apparent unwillingness to hand over the gold and begins to build an army to combat him. Caught up in the middle of the conflict, Zatoichi battles both sides until everyone falls dead. Taking his opportunity, Yojimbo catches the weary Zatoichi and fights a quick duel, which ends in a draw when he slices him across the back and Zatoichi in return stabs him in the thigh.

== Cast ==
- Shintaro Katsu − Zatoichi
- Toshiro Mifune - 'Yojimbo' Daisaku Sasa
- Ayako Wakao − Umeno
- Osamu Takizawa − Yasuke Eboshiya
- Masakane Yonekura − Boss Masagoro
- Minori Terada - Yogo
- Toshio Hosokawa - Goto Sanzaemon
- Shin Kishida − Kuzuryu
- Kanjūrō Arashi - Hyoroku

== Production ==
- Yoshinobu Nishioka - art direction
