= Tsūkai! Kōchiyama Sōshun =

- Also known as: 痛快!河内山宗俊
- Genre: Jidaigeki
- Directed by: Kenji Misumi; Kimiyoshi Yasuda; Shintaro Katsu; Eiichi Kudo
- Starring: Shintaro Katsu; Yoshio Harada; Shōhei Hino; Kaori Momoi; Mitsuko Kusabue; Hideji Ōtaki
- Theme music composer: "Itsunohinika Hitoni Kataro" Sang by Hide Demon
- Country of origin: Japan
- Original language: Japanese
- No. of episodes: 26

Production
- Producer: Nishioka Hiroyasu
- Running time: 45 minutes (per episode)
- Production companies: FUJI TV, Katsu Production

Original release
- Network: Fuji Television
- Release: October 6, 1975 – March 29, 1976

Tsūkai! Kōchiyama Sōshun (痛快!河内山宗俊) is a Japanese television jidaigeki or period drama that was broadcast in 1975–1976. The lead star is Shintaro Katsu; his older brother Tomisaburo Wakayama also appeared in the episodes 5, 7 and 25.

== Plot ==
Kōchiyama Sōshun serves as a cha-bōzu (a kind of tea man) in the administrative headquarters of the Tokugawa shogunate, but works behind the scenes to protect powerless people from the evil power of the Tokugawa shogunate. Kataoka Naojirō and Ushimatsu work for Kōchiyama. Kaneko Ichinojō is a ronin whose interests often align with Kōchiyama.

== Cast ==
- Shintaro Katsu as Kōchiyama Sōshun
- Yoshio Harada as Kaneko Ichinojō
- Shōhei Hino as Ushimatsu
- Hide Demon as Kataoka Naojirō
- Kaori Momoi as Ochiyo
- Mitsuko Kusabue as Otaki
- Tomisaburo Wakayama as Tōyama Kinsirō
- So Yamamura as Mizuno Tadakuni
- Hideji Ōtaki as Moritaya Seibei
- Naruse Tadashi
- Hosei Komatsu as Nishiyama Gensai
- Shin Kishida as Tori Yozō

== Directors ==
- Shintaro Katsu (Episodes 15, 23 and 25)
- Kenji Misumi (Episodes 1, 5 and 7)
- Eiichi Kudo (Episodes 2, 10 and 20)
- Kimiyoshi Yasuda (Episodes 16 and 24)
- Kazuo Mori (Episodes 4 and 11)

== See also ==
- Oshizamurai Kiichihōgan, (1973)TV series Tomisaburo Wakayama and Shintaro Katsu appeared.
