= Zatoichi (1989 film) =

- Film poster
- Directed by: Shintaro Katsu
- Screenplay by: Tatsumi Ichiyama; Shintarô Katsu; Tsutomu Nakamura; Kyôhei Nakaoka
- Story by: Kan Shimosawa
- Produced by: Shintaro Katsu; Masanori Sanada; Kiyoshi Tsukamoto
- Starring: Shintaro Katsu; Kanako Higuchi; Takanori Jinnai; Tsurutarō Kataoka; Takehiro Okumura; Norihei Miki; Yuya Uchida; Ken Ogata
- Cinematography: Mutsuo Naganuma
- Edited by: Toshio Taniguchi
- Music by: Takayuki Watanabe
- Production company: Katsu Production Co. Ltd.
- Distributed by: Shochiku Company (1989, Japan)
- Release date: 4 February 1989 (Japan)
- Running time: 116 minutes
- Country: Japan
- Language: Japanese

Zatôichi (Japanese: 座頭市), also known as Zatoichi: Darkness Is His Ally, Zatoichi: The Blind Swordsman and Shintaro Katsu's Zatoichi, is a 1989 Japanese Chambara film directed by and starring Shintaro Katsu, who also produced and co-wrote the screenplay. It is the twenty-sixth entry in a series of films featuring the blind swordsman Zatoichi, released 16 years after the twenty-fifth film in the series Zatoichi's Conspiracy (1973). The main character is based on a fictional character, a blind masseur and swordmaster created by novelist Kan Shimozawa and set during the late Edo period.

Zatoichi is the last film in the original classic saga of Zatoichi (1962–1989). It is also the second time Shintaro Katsu directed a Zatoichi film, and the last time Katsu played the title character on screen.

== Synopsis ==
After being released from a brief captivity in prison, an older Ichi continues his life of wandering. He befriends a Rōnin (a masterless samurai), and later decides to live in a village, which happens to be doomed and besieged by the unholy alliance of the Yakuza lord Boss Goemon with the mad and corrupt Inspector Hasshuu. After learning of the ominous fate of the villagers, Zatoichi throws himself once again into a fierce battle, facing both Goemon's army and the unnamed Ronin, who has been hired by Goemon to eliminate Zatoichi.

== Cast ==
- Shintaro Katsu ... Zatôichi/Ichi, a zatô in the Tôdô-za
- Ken Ogata ... Rônin/Masterless samurai
- Kanako Higuchi ... Boss Han Bosatsu/Ohan of the Bosatsu
- Takanori Jinnai ... Inspector Hasshuu/Hanshu
- Tsurutaro Kataoka ... Tsuru
- Toyomi Kusano ... Ume
- Ryûtarô Gan ... Boss Goemon (billed as Takehiro Okumura)
- Keizō Kanie
- Joe Yamanaka
- Rikiya Yasuoka
- Norihei Miki ... Zatoichi's friend
- Yuya Uchida ... Boss Akabei

== Production ==
The film was shot in a village (eiga-mura) located in the mountains of Kanami.

=== Controversy ===
On the morning of Monday 26 December 1988, Ryûtarô Gan (the eldest son of Shintarô Katsu), who played Boss Goemon, while on set shooting the film, stabbed and killed actor Yukio Katô in a tragic accident. Gan (who was 24 at the time) struck Katô (age 34) in the neck with a katana long sword, which was supposed to be a prop, while performing an action scene. Kato was taken unconscious to the Okayama University Hospital (Okayama Daigaku Igakubu Fuzoku-byôin), where he died as a result of massive blood loss from the neck wound. Hiroshima Prefectural Police determined that the incident was one of professional negligence causing death (gyômujô-kashitsu chishi). Ryûtarô Gan was accused of professional negligence and would later state in court that he did not know that the sword he used was a real one. A police investigation established the cause of death as "professional negligence".

== Home media ==
A Blu-ray disc was released on August 28, 2018 by Tokyo Shock/Media Blasters. The A/V quality release is presented in its proper 1.85:1 theatrical aspect ratio, while the audio is Japanese 2.0 LPCM stereo (48 kHz/16 bit), with optional English subtitles are available. The only extras on the disc are both in low quality SD: they include the original video release trailer for the film and also "The Zatoichi Gallery: Video History of a Legend", which is an 11-minute video gallery of Japanese and international poster images, production stills, pressbooks, record covers, and the like spanning the entire history of the character. Both of these are carried over from the previous Media Blasters DVD release.

== Legacy ==
Shintaro Katsu’s Zatoichi did not exactly resurrect its star's career, but it did redeem an almost lost decade for the actor and filmmaker. Katsu went on to co-star in Kazuo Kuroki’s mud-caked remake of the silent classic Roningai in 1990, which received a fair amount of critical notice and international festival exposure. Katsu's performance as the fading, overweight and inebriated ruffian Goemon the Bull was to be his final screen appearance before dying of throat cancer in 1997.

In his review for the 2018 Blu-ray release for The Digital Bits, Bill Hunt gave an overall positive assessment, also stating: "Zatoichi (1989) certainly isn't the best film in this series, as it repeats or echoes many scenes found in earlier films, the editing can be a little disjointed, and the story occasionally feels too much like a vanity project for Katsu. But the film does have its charms. In between episodes of carnage, Katsu's final turn as the Blind Swordsman offers moments of his characteristic humor, a bit of reflection, and his usual humanity".
