= Zatoichi =

Fictional character (blind swordsman) created by Kan Shimozawa

- Zatoichi character
- North American Home Vision Entertainment DVD cover of The Tale of Zatoichi
- First appearance: Zatoichi Monogatari (1948)
- Created by: Kan Shimozawa
- Portrayed by: Shintaro Katsu (1962–1989); Takeshi Kitano (2003 film); Show Aikawa (2007 play); Tetta Sugimoto (2008 film); Shingo Katori (2010 film)

Zatoichi (Japanese: 座頭市) is a fictional character created by Japanese novelist Kan Shimozawa. He is an itinerant blind masseur and swordsman of Japan's late Edo period (1830s and 1840s). He first appeared in the 1948 essay Zatoichi Monogatari, part of Shimozawa's Futokoro Techō series that was serialized in the magazine Shōsetsu to Yomimono.

== Overview ==
Zatoichi was originally a minor character but, after drastic alterations, was developed for the screen by Daiei Film and actor Shintaro Katsu, becoming the subject of one of the company's leading franchises and one of Japan's longest-running film series, even after the bankruptcy of the company in 1971. A total of 26 films were made between 1962 and 1989. From 1974 to 1979, a television series was produced, starring Katsu and some of the same actors that appear in the films. Produced by Katsu Productions, 100 episodes were aired before the Zatoichi television series was cancelled.

The seventeenth film of the Zatoichi series was remade in the US in 1989 by TriStar Pictures as Blind Fury, starring Rutger Hauer. A 2003 film was directed by Takeshi Kitano, who also starred as the title character. It was awarded the Venice Film Festival's Silver Lion for Best Direction. A stage adaptation of Zatoichi directed by Takashi Miike and starring Show Aikawa was filmed in 2007 and later released on home video. Zatoichi: The Last is a 2010 film directed by Junji Sakamoto and starring Shingo Katori.

== Character ==
Zatoichi at first comes across as a harmless blind anma (masseur) and bakuto (gambler) who wanders the land, making his living by chō-han (playing dice) as well as giving massages, performing acupuncture and even, on occasion, singing and playing music. Secretly, however, he is very highly skilled in swordsmanship, specifically Muraku-school kenjutsu and iaido along with the more general sword skills of Japan, as well as sumo wrestling and kyujutsu.

Little of his past is revealed, other than that he lost his sight as a child through illness. His father disappeared for undisclosed reasons when Zatoichi was about five years old. He is described by his swordsmanship instructor as having practiced constantly and with extreme devotion when he was a pupil in order to develop his exceptional skills. Zatoichi says of himself that he became a yakuza (gangster) during those three years he spent training (which immediately precede the original The Tale of Zatoichi) and killed many people, something he later came to deeply regret. This is reflected in his willingness to involve himself in the affairs of others—chiefly, those suffering from oppression and exploitation, or some form of corruption. Despite that moral re-assessment and his new perspective and remorse (and most often because of them), he usually has a bounty (sometimes quite large) on his head from one source or another throughout the movies and series. However, because of his earnestness, wit, and natural sense of empathy, many people who encounter him during his travels grow to respect and even care for him.

Unlike a bushi, he does not carry a traditional katana. Instead, he uses a well-made shikomi-zue (仕込み杖, lit. "prepared cane" or cane sword), as the use or possession of true fighting blades was formally outlawed for non-samurai during the Edo period. The decree was virtually impossible to enforce, however, as evidenced by the yakuza enforcers being shown wielding katanas throughout the films. The blades of Shikomi-zue were generally straight-edged, of lower-quality, unfolded steel, which could not compare with even a low-end katana. As a result, the blade in Ichi's cane sword is broken during the climactic battle in Zatoichi the Fugitive (the fourth film). The sword has a new blade by the next film, which he wields until the fifteenth film Zatoichi's Cane Sword. The blade (which breaks during the film) and the blade that replaces it were specially forged at great expense and with far more than the usual care by master bladesmiths and were both of exceptional quality, superior to the swords of even most samurai. At the beginning of Zatoichi Meets Yojimbo, his swordblade (presumably the same) inexplicably breaks and is sold to a blacksmith along with its hilt and scabbard. Its replacement is not a shikomi-zue, but a jotō (杖刀 lit. a "staff sword") of unrevealed origin that resembles a short, thick bo staff, which also soon breaks. In the next film, Zatoichi: The Festival of Fire, he is once again using his trademark cane sword, outfitted with a new blade of unknown origin and quality.

The principal recurring thematic formula of these films and the television series is that of the ever-wandering and sentimental drifter who protects the innocent and the helpless from oppressive or warring yakuza gangs, stops the worst of general injustice or predation and aids the unfortunate, and often, through no fault of his own, is set upon by ruffians or stumbles into harm's way. Zatoichi's saga is essentially one of an earthy but basically good and wise man almost always trying to do the decent thing, to somehow redeem himself and perhaps atone for past failings. Nevertheless, he believes himself instead to be a stained, corrupted and evil man, irredeemable and undeserving of the love and respect that some show and rightly have for him. This self-described "god of calamities" is routinely a magnet for troubles of one sort or another. Death is his only constant companion, as he pragmatically does not allow other people, especially those he loves or thinks highly of, to get close and stay there for long; such would lead to eventual tragedy. Death does seem, like a shadow, actually to follow an often reluctant Zatoichi almost everywhere he goes, and despite his mostly compassionate nature, killing appears to come entirely naturally to him.

His lightning-fast fighting skill is superlative, with his sword held in a reverse grip; this, combined with his unflappable steel-nerved wits in a fight, his keen ears, sense of smell and proprioception, all render him a formidable adversary. He is also quite capable with a traditional katana, as seen in Zatoichi's Vengeance and the bathhouse scene in Zatoichi and the Festival of Fire. Similarly, he displays considerable skill using two swords simultaneously, in Musashi-like Nitō Ichi style in Zatoichi and the Doomed Man. Almost preternaturally dangerous with blades, he is fully capable (whether standing, sitting or lying down) of fighting and swiftly defeating multiple skilled opponents simultaneously. Some, however, have come close to besting him in combat, in particular during the final duel in Zatoichi Challenged, where extenuating circumstances played a role.

A number of other standard scenarios are also repeated through the series: Zatoichi's winning of large amounts at gambling via his ability to hear whether the dice have fallen on even or odd is a common theme, as is his catching loaded or substituted dice by the difference in their sound. This frequently culminates in another set piece, Zatoichi's cutting the candles lighting the room and reducing it to pitch blackness, commonly accompanied by his tagline "Kurayami nara kotchi no mon da" (暗闇ならこっちのもんだ; roughly meaning "Darkness is my ally" or "Now we are all blind").

The character's name is actually Ichi. Zatō is a title, the lowest of the four official ranks within the Tōdōza, the historical guild for blind men (thus, zato also designates a blind person in Japanese slang). Ichi is therefore properly called Zatō-no-Ichi ("Low-Ranking Blind Person Ichi", approximately), or Zatōichi for short. Massage and acupuncture were traditional occupations for the blind (as their lack of sight removed the issue of gender). Being lesser hinin (lit. "non-people"), blind people and masseurs were regarded as among the very lowest of the low in social class, other than eta or outright criminals; they were generally considered wretches, beneath notice, no better than beggars or even the insane—especially during the Edo period—and it was also commonly thought that the blind were accursed, despicable, severely mentally disabled, deaf and sexually dangerous.

== Original film series ==
The original series of 26 films featured Shintaro Katsu as Zatoichi. The first film was made in 1962 in black and white. The third film, in 1963, was the first to be filmed in color. The 25th film was made in 1973, followed by a hiatus of 16 years until Katsu's last film, which he wrote and directed himself in 1989.

The original series of movies features other popular fictional characters of the genre on two occasions. Zatoichi Meets the One-Armed Swordsman (1971) connects with the Shaw Brothers series of Hong Kong-produced movies directed by prolific director Chang Cheh; and Zatoichi Meets Yojimbo (1970) features Toshiro Mifune as Imperial Shogunate Secret Agent Daisaku Sasa. This character resembles the title character of Akira Kurosawa's films Yojimbo and Sanjuro. The earlier films, in which Mifune's character used the pseudonym Sanjuro (30-year-old), are alluded to when Sassa is jokingly called Shijuro (40-year-old).

=== List of films ===
No.	English Title	Year	Japanese	Romanization	Director	Production	Distribution
1	The Tale of Zatoichi	1962	座頭市物語	Zatōichi monogatari	Kenji Misumi	Daiei	Daiei
2	The Tale of Zatoichi Continues	1962	続・座頭市物語	Zoku Zatōichi monogatari	Kazuo Mori	Daiei	Daiei
3	The New Tale of Zatoichi	1963	新・座頭市物語	Shin Zatōichi monogatari	Tokuzō Tanaka	Daiei	Daiei
4	Zatoichi the Fugitive	1963	座頭市兇状旅	Zatōichi kyōjō-tabi	Tokuzō Tanaka	Daiei	Daiei
5	Zatoichi on the Road	1963	座頭市喧嘩旅	Zatōichi kenka-tabi	Kimiyoshi Yasuda	Daiei	Daiei
6	Zatoichi and the Chest of Gold	1964	座頭市千両首	Zatōichi senryō-kubi	Kazuo Ikehiro	Daiei	Daiei
7	Zatoichi's Flashing Sword	1964	座頭市あばれ凧	Zatōichi abare tako	Kazuo Ikehiro	Daiei	Daiei
8	Fight, Zatoichi, Fight	1964	座頭市血笑旅	Zatōichi kesshō-tabi	Kenji Misumi	Daiei	Daiei
9	Adventures of Zatoichi	1964	座頭市関所破り	Zatōichi sekisho-yaburi	Kimiyoshi Yasuda	Daiei	Daiei
10	Zatoichi's Revenge	1965	座頭市二段斬り	Zatōichi nidan-giri	Akira Inoue	Daiei	Daiei
11	Zatoichi and the Doomed Man	1965	座頭市逆手斬り	Zatōichi sakate-giri	Kazuo Mori	Daiei	Daiei
12	Zatoichi and the Chess Expert	1965	座頭市地獄旅	Zatōichi jigoku-tabi	Kenji Misumi	Daiei	Daiei
13	Zatoichi's Vengeance	1966	座頭市の歌が聞える	Zatōichi no uta ga kikoeru	Tokuzō Tanaka	Daiei	Daiei
14	Zatoichi's Pilgrimage	1966	座頭市海を渡る	Zatōichi umi o wataru	Kazuo Ikehiro	Daiei	Daiei
15	Zatoichi's Cane Sword	1967	座頭市鉄火旅	Zatōichi tekka-tabi	Kimiyoshi Yasuda	Daiei	Daiei
16	Zatoichi the Outlaw	1967	座頭市牢破り	Zatōichi rōyaburi	Satsuo Yamamoto	Katsu Productions	Daiei
17	Zatoichi Challenged	1967	座頭市血煙り街道	Zatōichi chikemurikaidō	Kenji Misumi	Daiei	Daiei
18	Zatoichi and the Fugitives	1968	座頭市果し状	Zatōichi hatashijō	Kimiyoshi Yasuda	Daiei	Daiei
19	Samaritan Zatoichi	1968	座頭市喧嘩太鼓	Zatōichi kenka-daiko	Kenji Misumi	Daiei	Daiei
20	Zatoichi Meets Yojimbo	1970	座頭市と用心棒	Zatōichi to Yōjinbō	Kihachi Okamoto	Katsu Productions	Daiei
21	Zatoichi Goes to the Fire Festival	1970	座頭市あばれ火祭り	Zatōichi abare-himatsuri	Kenji Misumi	Katsu Productions	Dainichi Eihai
22	Zatoichi and the One-Armed Swordsman	1971	新座頭市・破れ！唐人剣	Shin Zatōichi: Yabure! Tōjin-ken	Kimiyoshi Yasuda	Katsu Productions	Dainichi Eihai
23	Zatoichi at Large	1972	座頭市御用旅	Zatōichi goyō-tabi	Kazuo Mori	Toho / Katsu Productions	Toho
24	Zatoichi in Desperation	1972	新座頭市物語・折れた杖	Shin Zatōichi monogatari: Oreta tsue	Shintaro Katsu	Katsu Productions	Toho
25	Zatoichi's Conspiracy	1973	新座頭市物語・笠間の血祭り	Shin Zatōichi monogatari: Kasama no chimatsuri	Kimiyoshi Yasuda	Katsu Productions	Toho
26	Zatoichi: Darkness Is His Ally	1989	座頭市	Zatōichi	Shintaro Katsu	Katsu Promotion	Shochiku

- Note: The English titles shown are the common commercially used titles; they are not direct translations of the original Japanese titles.

=== Directors ===
Many directors directed multiple Zatoichi movies. The directors are (in order of number of movies they directed):

- Kenji Misumi: 6
- Kimiyoshi Yasuda: 6
- Kazuo Mori: 3
- Tokuzō Tanaka: 3
- Kazuo Ikehiro: 3
- Shintaro Katsu: 2
- Akira Inoue: 1
- Satsuo Yamamoto: 1
- Kihachi Okamoto: 1

== Television series ==
The television series Zatoichi ran for four seasons—a total of 100 episodes—with Shintaro Katsu in the lead role:

1. 26 episodes, in 1974
2. 29 episodes, in 1976
3. 19 episodes, in 1978
4. 26 episodes, in 1979

Most of the stories in the television series are original dramas, but some are essentially redacted remakes of the full-length Zatoichi films of the previous decade such as Season One, Episode 14, "Fighting Journey with Baby in Tow" (corresponds to the 8th film "Fight, Zatoichi, Fight" 座頭市血笑旅 Zatōichi kesshō-tabi); Season One, Episode 16, "The Winds From Mt. Akagi".

The first season of television shows has been released with English subtitles from Media Blasters / Tokyo Shock.

== Production companies ==
The first 20 films were produced and distributed by Daiei Film, except for the 16th film Zatoichi the Outlaw and the 20th film Zatoichi Meets Yojimbo which were produced by Shintaro Katsu's own company, Katsu Productions, and distributed theatrically by Daiei. Following the bankruptcy of Daiei in 1971, Katsu Productions and Toho formed a partnership to continue the production of the series and Gamera, another leading franchise of the company, and both series derived several films, along with Razor, and a Lone Wolf and Cub series adaptation Shogun Assassin under this structure respectively.

The last 6 films (and the TV series) were also produced by Katsu Productions. Distribution of these films was done by Dainichi Eihai (Zatoichi Goes to the Fire Festival, Zatoichi Meets the One-Armed Swordsman), Toho (Zatoichi at Large which Toho also co-produced with Katsu Productions, Zatoichi in Desperation, and Zatoichi at the Blood Fest), and Shochiku which released Katsu's last Zatoichi film in 1989. It was re-released (and retitled Darkness Is His Ally) in 2004, occasioned by the new 2003 Zatoichi film, Zatoichi, starring Takeshi Kitano, which Shochiku also released.

Chambara Entertainment/Video Action of Honolulu held the original VHS release rights to the Zatoichi film series numbers 1-20, though it only released some of them. Chambara eventually expired its North American release license. AnimEigo held the remainder of the VHS rights.

Home Vision Entertainment was granted United States distribution rights to the original Daiei films (except for the 14th and the 16th (the second of which was still in possession of AnimEigo)), and released them on DVD: the films were numbered 1–13, 15, and 17–19. AnimEigo released seven of the films: Zatoichi the Outlaw (1967), Zatoichi Meets Yojimbo (1970), Zatoichi at the Fire Festival (1970, as Zatoichi: The Festival of Fire), Zatoichi Meets the One-Armed Swordsman (1971), Zatoichi at Large (1972), Zatoichi in Desperation (1972), and Zatoichi at the Blood Fest (1973, as Zatoichi's Conspiracy).

Media Blasters (under their Tokyo Shock label) have released both the 1989 film and the first season (26 episodes) of the TV series.

The Criterion Collection released the first 25 films as a dual-format Blu-ray and DVD boxed set on November 26, 2013.

== Remakes and spin-offs ==
=== Blind Fury ===
In 1989, TriStar Pictures released a remake called Blind Fury, starring Rutger Hauer as a Vietnam War vet who is blinded, then taught to use a cane sword by a local tribe before returning home to America. This film is based on Zatoichi Challenged (1967), the 17th film in the original series.

=== 2003 film ===
In 2003, Takeshi Kitano wrote, directed and appeared in a new high-budget film featuring the character, Zatoichi. It premiered on September 3, 2003, at the Venice Film Festival, where it won the prestigious Silver Lion award, and went on to numerous other awards both at home and abroad. The soundtrack was composed by Keiichi Suzuki and the Japanese tap dance troupe The Stripes. Zatoichi discovers a small, remote mountain town that has been overtaken by a bullying gang that is extorting money from the townspeople. As Zatoichi seeks to liberate the town, he encounters a rōnin seeking employment to pay for his ailing wife's needs, and two geisha who are seeking to avenge the murder of their parents, but he soon discovers that they are not what they seem to be.

=== Stage adaptation ===
A stage version of Zatoichi directed by Takashi Miike starred Show Aikawa. It was filmed in 2007 and later released on home video.

=== Ichi ===
In 2008's Ichi, a blind female musician who is rescued (and later trained) by Zatoichi travels through Japan to find her mentor.

=== Zatoichi: The Last ===
Toho released a new Zatoichi film starring Shingo Katori titled Zatoichi: The Last on May 29, 2010.

== In other works ==
- In 1969, Teruo Sakamaki (酒巻輝男), a Japanese restaurant owner from Shinjuku turned Shintaro Katsu/Zatoichi impersonator, starred in a pink film entitled Lewd Priest: Forty-Eight Positions Cutting (好色坊主 四十八手斬り). The film was directed by Kaoru Umezawa and produced by Uematsu Productions, which was reportedly sued by Daiei for copyright infringement. Under various aliases including "Shintaro Katsu look-alike (勝新太郎ソックリショー)", "Rintaro Katsu (勝利太郎)", and "Sing Lung (勝龍)", Sakamaki continued to imitate Shintaro Katsu as Zatoichi in numerous films in Taiwan including: The Blind Swordsman's Revenge or The Blind Swordsman vs. The Flying Guillotine (盲劍・血滴子) (1972), The Blind Swordsman vs White Wolf (盲俠鬥白狼) (1972), Trust and Brotherhood (義氣傳義氣) (1972), The Hunchback (漢駝) (1972), Inspector Karate (頭號鐵人) (1973), and The Devil's Owl (魔鬼怪鷹) (1977).
- The 1969–70 Crimson Bat film series and its subsequent 1971 TV series were unauthorized variations, with a blind woman named O-Ichi, played by Yoko Matsuyama, as the sword-wielding hero.
- Blindman is a 1971 Spaghetti Western variation on the Zatoichi formula starring Tony Anthony as a blind gunman.
- In Hou Hsiao-hsien’s debut feature Cute Girl (1980), the main character Daigang performs a brief Zatoichi impression.
- The second season of the 1985 animated series Thundercats features a character named Lynx-O, who shares many similarities to Zatoichi. Having been blinded by volcanic gasses during his escape from his dying homeworld of Thundera, Lynx-O develops his other senses to "see" the world around him. He is a formidable fighter, and can use pressure points to disable and defeat his foes.
- The character of Zatoichi finds homage in the character of Zato-Ino (also known as "the Blind Swordspig") in Stan Sakai's long-running anthropomorphic comic series Usagi Yojimbo (1984). This iteration of the character uses his keen sense of smell to find his way and to combat his enemies. Zato-Ino first appeared in Critters #7 (Jan 1987), published by Fantagraphics Books.
- A Western TV movie titled Blind Justice was released in 1994 from HBO. A blinded Civil War veteran protects a baby he is transporting to family beyond a border town besieged by bandits.
- In the 1998 video game series Guilty Gear, one of the original characters is named Zato-1, who also happens to be a blind assassin. Although his name is pronounced Zato-one, the Japanese word for one is ichi, hence Zato-ichi.
- In the 2005 episode of The Boondocks titled "Grandad's Fight", Huey has a dream in which he fights Col. Stinkmeaner – a blind and cruel elderly man who had beaten his grandfather earlier in the episode – as a samurai. Later in the episode, Huey shows his grandfather footage of the animated Zatoichi in action, comparing Stinkmeaner to the blind swordsman.
- In the 2006 film Devil's Den, the main characters, while being trapped in the strip club by female ghouls, have a fantasy scenario of how Zatoichi would deal with the ghouls himself.
- In the Shogun Pack update of the 2007 multiplayer first-person shooter Team Fortress 2, a katana called "The Half-Zatoichi" was introduced for use by both the Soldier and Demoman, alluding to the fact that the Demoman is missing an eye and is half-blind, while the Soldier's helmet covers his eyes and restricts his vision.
- In the 2007 American exploitation horror film Death Proof, Jungle Julia sarcastically calls Stuntman Mike "Zatoichi" when he fails to notice a billboard. Mike responds with a wide grin similar to Zatoichi's.
- Italian heavy metal band Holy Martyr released a song titled "Zatoichi" on their 2011 album Invincible, based on the character. The album's cover art depicts Zatoichi in combat against two rival warriors.
- In the 2013 online co-op game Warframe, there is a katana stance called "Blind Justice", which causes the katana to be held in reverse grip. Its first attack combination is called "Zatos' Creed", all of them being references to Zatoichi. As well as this, there is a skin for the "Excalibur" Warframe named "Excalibur Zato".
- In the long-running manga series One Piece, the minor character and marine Admiral Fujitora is based upon Zatoichi.
- In the music video for Wednesday Campanella's song Inca, singer KOM_I plays a Zatoichi inspired character.
- The character of Zatoichi also finds homage in 2016's Rogue One: A Star Wars Story, where Chinese actor Donnie Yen appears as Chirrut Îmwe, a blind transient wanderer who is secretly a highly skilled warrior who believes in, and has a connection with, the Force. Jedi characters Rahm Kota and Kanan Jarrus also draw inspiration from the character.
- In 2017, a short eight-minute fictitious sci-fi film trailer entitled ZVP - Zatoichi vs Predator, produced, written and directed by Junya Okabe as a nonprofit fan film starring Shun Sugata as Zatoichi was released by Blast Inc. and made available on YouTube. A very special team of villains attack and kill a group of samurai comic book style, until a mysterious samurai appears to defeat them. He is revealed to be a Predator and Zatoichi will face him with a Star Wars-style Jedi Knight lightsaber. A making-of video was also available.
- Denzel Curry's album Melt My Eyez See Your Future features a track titled "Zatoichi", and its accompanying music video includes Curry training under a blind martial artist.

== See also ==
- Samurai cinema
- Bakuto
- Cho-han bakuchi
- Lone Wolf and Cub
- Stick (character)

== Bibliography ==
- Silver, Alain (1983) [1977]. "5. The Alien Hero I. The Blind Swordfighters: Zato Ichi and the Crimson Bat". The Samurai Film. Woodstock, New York: The Overlook Press. pp. 76–83. ISBN 978-0-87951-175-3.
