= Zatoichi and the One-Armed Swordsman =

1971 Japanese-Hong Kong film by Kimiyoshi Yasuda and Hsu Tseng Hung

Zatoichi and the One-Armed Swordsman (新座頭市・破れ!唐人剣)
- Theatrical release poster
- Directed by: Kimiyoshi Yasuda; Hsu Tseng Hung
- Screenplay by: Takayuki Yamada; Kimiyoshi Yasuda
- Story by: Kan Shimozawa
- Produced by: Shintaro Katsu; Wong Ming
- Starring: Shintaro Katsu; Jimmy Wang Yu
- Cinematography: Chikashi Makiura
- Edited by: Toshio Taniguchi
- Production companies: Katsu Productions; Wing Luen Movie Film Company
- Distributed by: Dainichi Eihai; Golden Harvest
- Release date: 13 January 1971
- Running time: 94 minutes
- Countries: Japan; Hong Kong
- Languages: Japanese; Mandarin

Zatoichi and the One-Armed Swordsman

Chinese name
- Traditional Chinese: 獨臂刀大戦盲侠
- Literal meaning: New Zatoichi Break! Chinese Sword
Transcriptions
Standard Mandarin
- Hanyu Pinyin: Dú bì dāo dàzhàn máng xiá
Yue: Cantonese
- Jyutping: duk6 bei3 dou1 daai6 zin3 maang4 hap6

Japanese name
- Kanji: 新座頭市・破れ！唐人剣 (Note: lit. 'New Zatoichi Break! Chinese Sword')
Transcriptions
- Romanization: Shin Zatōichi: Yabure! Tōjin-ken

Zatoichi and the One-Armed Swordsman (Japanese: 新座頭市・破れ！唐人剣; Chinese: 獨臂刀大戦盲侠), also known as Zatoichi Meets the One-Armed Swordsman and The Blind Swordsman Meets His Equal, is a 1971 chambara-wuxia crossover by Japanese film director Kimiyoshi Yasuda and Chinese film director Hsu Tseng Hung. A Japanese-Hong Kong co-production, the film stars Shintaro Katsu as the blind swordsman Zatoichi and Jimmy Wang Yu as the "One-Armed Swordsman" Wang Kang. It is a crossover of the long-running Zatoichi series and the One-Armed Swordsman film series.

The Chinese edit of the film reportedly featured a different ending where Wang Kang was victorious in the final duel, rather than Zatoichi.

== Plot ==
While traveling the Japanese countryside the blind masseur Zatoichi (Shintaro Katsu) comes across the One-Armed Swordsman, Wang Kang (Jimmy Wang Yu), who is in hiding and protecting a child from a corrupt Japanese priest and a group of yakuza. Zatoichi and Wang Kang, each from very different worlds (Japan and China, respectively) yet heroic swordsmen in their own right, at first seem to get along but a language barrier and a series of misunderstanding leads Kang to distrust Ichi. Soon the two heroes are at each other throats while each attempts to stop the true villains from taking the child.

== Cast ==
- Shintaro Katsu as Zatoichi
- Jimmy Wang Yu as Wang Kang
- Yūko Hama as Osen
- Michie Terada as Oyone
- Kōji Nanbara as Kakuzen
- Tokue Hanasawa as Yosaku
- Shinsuke Minami as Henoichi
- Shirō Itō as Shinshichi
- Toru Abe as Boss Tōbei
- Wang Ling as Li Yumei
- Cheung Yik as Li Xiangrong

== Production ==
- Yoshinobu Nishioka - Art director
