= Oshizamurai Kiichihōgan =

- Also known as: The Mute Samurai
- 唖侍鬼一法眼
- Genre: Jidaigeki
- Directed by: Kenji Misumi; Kimiyoshi Yasuda; Shintaro Katsu; Kazuo Mori
- Starring: Tomisaburo Wakayama; Shintaro Katsu
- Theme music composer: Isao Tomita, "Kodokuni Owarete" Sang by Shintaro Katsu
- Country of origin: Japan
- Original language: Japanese
- No. of episodes: 26

Production
- Producer: Shintaro Katsu
- Running time: 45 minutes (per episode)
- Production companies: NTV, Katsu Production

Original release
- Network: Nippon Television
- Release: October 7, 1973 – March 31, 1974

Oshizamurai Kiichihōgan (唖侍鬼一法眼) also known as The Mute Samurai or The Silent Samurai is a Japanese television jidaigeki or period drama, that was broadcast in 1973–1974. The lead star is Tomisaburo Wakayama; his younger brother Shintaro Katsu also appeared and directed episode 1. It is based on Kanda Takeshi's manga Oshizamurai Kiichihōgan.

== Plot ==
Kiichi Hōgan is a samurai who had been a victim of a vicious crime, completely changing his life forever. 18 years previously, his father (a Nagasaki magistrate who spoke out against illegal smuggling) and mother were murdered and his fiancee violated by a skilled Spaniard swordsman named Gonzalez who slashed Kiichi's throat, severing his vocal chords. Now, Kiichi Hōgan has abandoned the way of the samurai and become a bounty hunter, taking Japan's most wanted criminals. He goes on a journey to find the Spaniard and fulfill his revenge.

== Cast ==
- Tomisaburo Wakayama as Kiichi Hōgan
- Shintaro Katsu as Manji (Nagasaki Bugyo)
- Judy Ongg as Okiku
- Kayo Matsuo as Kikuno
- Minoru Ōki as Tokaiya
- Kanjūrō Arashi as Monk Jikai
- Tony Cetera as Gonzales

== Episode list ==
Episode	Title	Directed by	Guest starrings
1	"The Man Who Lost His Ability to Sing" ("Kuchibirukara Utawo Ubawareta Otoko")	Shintaro Katsu	Shintaro Katsu, Judy Ongg, Hideyo Amamoto, Jūkei Fujioka
2	"A Silent Prayer for A Little boy" ("Kuchinashi no Komoriuta")	Kimiyoshi Yasuda	Kiwako Taichi, Shin Kishida
3	"The Dangerous Highway" ("Kaen no Kaidō")	Kenji Misumi	Yuko Hama, Yoshi Katō, Koji Wada
4	"The Bridge to The Dark World" ("Rokudō Jigokubashi")	Kimiyoshi Yasuda	Shinjirō Ehara, Eiji Gō
5	"The Fateful Encounter" ("Ruten no Meguriai")	Tomisaburo Wakayama	Kei Taguchi
6	"A Whirlwind of Blood" ("Keppū Touge")	Akira Ōsu	Akira Yamauchi, Yoshiko Nakada, Tatsurō Endō
7	"A Silent Parting of the Ways" ("Kuchinashi no Wakaremichi")	Kazuo Mori	Midori Nishizaki
8	"The Capture at the Stream" ("Dakuryu no Bijogari")	Yoshiyuki Kuroda	Mikio Narita, Yuriko Shinkai
9	"The Girl with the Blue Eyes" ("Aoime no Shōjō")	Kenji Misumi	Silvia Walker, Toru Abe, Rokkō Toura, Shōbun Inoue
10	"A Widow's Strength" ("Hoeta Touge no Onna Gokoro")	Buichi Saitō	Taketoshi Naito, Yumi Iwai, Kenji Imai
11	"Two Brothers in a Raging Sea" ("Dotō no Kyoudai")	Yoshiyuki Kuroda	Jun Tazaki, Tamao Nakamura, Toshio Takahara
12	"The Flower of Head Display Pass" ("Gokumon Tōuge no Kikunohana")	Buichi Saitō	Masumi Harukawa, Renji Ishibashi, Fumio Watanabe
13	"A Dark-Haired Human Sacrifice" ("Kurogami Jigoku")	Kōsaku Yamashita	Kensaku Hara, Mitsuo Nagata
14	"The First Performance" ("Hana no Butai")	Kenji Misumi	Masao Komatsu, Kō Nishimura
15	"The Bounty Hunters Who Vanished" ("Kieta Shōukinkasegi")	Masao Kobayashi	Shingo Yamashiro, Seiichirō Kameishi, Junko Hitomo
16	"Manji Once Again" ("Manji Futatabi")	Kimiyoshi Yasuda	Kōji Nanbara, Kaku Takashina, Miyoko Akaza
17	"The Peak of Darkness" ("Kettō Mumeigoku")	Akira Ōsu	Shōhei Hino, Asao Uchida, Keiko Yumi
18	"The Bandits and the Children" ("Yatō to Hana to Kodomotachi")	Kenji Misumi	Goichi Yamada, Tokue Hanazawa, Harumi Sone
19	"Who Shall Receive the Bounty" ("Shōukin Uketorinin")	Tomisaburo Wakayama	Akiji Kobayashi, Hiroshi Nawa, Isao Kimura
20	"The Maiden Who Casts a Shadow" ("Kage wo Ouhana")	Akira Ōsu	Mari Shiraki, Takeshi Kato
21	"A Mother and Daughter's Crisis" ("Boshizō Muzan")	Yoshiyuki Kuroda	Etsuko Ichihara, Hōsei Komatsu
22	"A Lad and a Vendetta" ("Shōnen to Adauchi")	Masao Kobayashi	Takashi Ehata
23	"A Camellia in Winter ("Kantsubaki Bojō")	Kimiyoshi Yasuda	Sanae Kitabayashi
24	"A Woman's Tears" ("Kanashii Onna")	Showa Ota	Asao Uchida, Yutaka Hayashi
25	"A Man to Man Promise" ("Otoko to Otoko no Yakusoku")	Masao Kobayashi	Mikio Narita, Shiho Fujimura
26	"Dual at Kanei-Ji Temple" ("Kaneiji no Kettō")	Kenji Misumi	Tony Cetera

== See also ==
- Tsūkai! Kōchiyama Sōshun (1975–76) TV series Shintaro Katsu and Tomisaburo Wakayama appeared.
- Kiichi Hōgen
