= List of Zatoichi episodes =

This is an episode list for the Japanese jidaigeki television series Zatoichi.

== Season 1 [1974] ==
No.	Title	Japanese	Original Air Date
1	A Challenge Of Chance	のるかそるかの正念場	October 3, 1974
2	The Flower That Bloomed With The Lullaby	子守唄に咲いた女郎花	October 10, 1974
3	A Memorial Day And The Bell Of Life	祥月命日いのちの鐘	October 17, 1974
4	The Kannon Statue that was Bound	縛られ観音ゆきずり旅	October 24, 1974
5	The Heartless Man, Touched By Compassion	情知らずが情に泣いた	October 31, 1974
6	Pouring Rain	どしゃぶり	November 7, 1974
7	A Bird Lands On Ichi	市に鳥がとまった	November 14, 1974
8	An Unforgettable Flower	忘れじの花	November 21, 1974
9	The Second Zatoichi	二人座頭市	November 28, 1974
10	The Sumo Wrestler That Found His Home	やぐら太鼓が風に哭いた	December 5, 1974
11	The Whirlwind Of Kisoji	木曽路のつむじ風	December 12, 1974
12	Humanity And Justice	やわ肌仁義	December 26, 1974
13	The 1,000 Ryo Raffle	潮風に舞った千両くじ	January 9, 1975
14	Fighting Journey With Baby In Tow	赤ン坊喧嘩旅	January 16, 1975
15	Festival Song Of The Raven	めんない鴉の祭り唄	January 23, 1975
16	The Wind From Mt. Akagi	赤城おろし	January 30, 1975
17	Burning Sunset on the Bridal Pass	花嫁峠に夕陽は燃えた	February 6, 1975
18	A Rush Trip	すっとび道中	February 13, 1975
19	A Rainbow In His Hometown	故郷に虹を見た	February 20, 1975
20	The Female Yakuza Boss	女親分と狼たち	February 27, 1975
21	The Fallen Flower That Bloomed By A Lake	湖に咲いたこぼれ花	March 6, 1975
22	A Father And Son's Song	父と子の詩	March 13, 1975
23	A Lover's Suicide Song	心中あいや節	March 20, 1975
24	The Coming Of Spring	信濃路に春は近い	March 27, 1975
25	The Yakuza Ways	渡世人	April 3, 1975
26	Traveling Alone	ひとり旅	April 17, 1975

== Season 2 [1976] ==
No.	Title	Japanese	Original Air Date
1	The Keepsake Dolls	情けの忘れ雛	October 4, 1976
2	Yearning For A Father	父恋い子守唄	October 11, 1976
3	A Parting Flower	瀬来の別れ花	October 18, 1976
4	The Moonrise Bodyguard	月の出の用心棒	October 25, 1976
5	On The Run	牢破りいそぎ旅	November 1, 1976
6	Tears In The Shadow Of His Teacher	師の影に泣いた	November 8, 1976
7	You Can Hear The Nursery Songs	わらべ唄が聞える	November 15, 1976
8	The Beautiful Prostitute In The Rain	雨の女郎花	November 22, 1976
9	A Rainbow in an Unseen Teardrop	見えない涙に虹を見た	November 29, 1976
10	Autumn Road for A Weeping Maid	娘が泣く木枯らし街道	December 6, 1976
11	The Two Roads Divided By The Winds	風に別れた二つ道	December 13, 1976
12	Money And Hell	金が身を食う地獄坂	December 20, 1976
13	Ichi Runs To The Mother's Tears	母の涙に市が走った	December 27, 1976
14	A Farewell In The Snow	雪の別れ路	January 10, 1977
15	A Cane Sword Burned In Anger	仕込杖が怒りに燃えた	January 17, 1977
16	A Woman On The Run	駆込み道中ふたり旅	January 24, 1977
17	A Mother And Son's Revenge	母子道に灯がともる	January 31, 1977
18	A Drunken River	酔いどれ川	February 7, 1977
19	The Girl From Echigo	越後から来た娘	February 14, 1977
20	Chess For A Lifetime	いのち駒	February 21, 1977
21	A Broken Promise	契り髪	February 28, 1977
22	Samurai Lullaby	浪人子守旅	March 7, 1977
23	The Ghost Beckoned Ichi	幽霊が市を招いた	March 14, 1977
24	Spring Goes On In Otone	大利根の春はゆく	March 21, 1977
25	The Vagabond's Return	帰って来た渡世人	March 28, 1977
26	The Crow Cries And Ichi Appears	鴉カァーとないて市が来た	April 4, 1977
27	Song Of A Traveler	旅人の詩	April 11, 1977
28	The Joshu Lullaby	上州わらべ唄	April 18, 1977
29	The Endless Journey	終わりなき旅路	April 25, 1977

== Season 3 [1978] ==
No.	Title	Japanese	Original Air Date
1	The 100 Ryo Love	恋鴉いのち百両	January 9, 1978
2	Spring Arrives For The Eyeless Daruma	目なし達磨に春がきた	January 16, 1978
3	The Palanquin Wars Of Tempo Period	天保元年駕籠戦争	January 23, 1978
4	The Firefly	蛍	January 30, 1978
5	The Song That Struck Ichi	歌声が市を斬った	February 6, 1978
6	The Five Swords	五本の長脇差	February 13, 1978
7	From Long Ago	遠い昔の日に	February 20, 1978
8	Here Comes The Masseur	そこのけ、そこのけ、あんまが通る	February 27, 1978
9	The Revolving Lantern	まわり燈籠	March 6, 1978
10	The Winter Sea	冬の海	March 13, 1978
11	Traveling With A Child	子別れ街道	March 20, 1978
12	At The Outbreak Of The Rain	雨あがり	March 27, 1978
13	The Woman Who Betrayed Chuji	忠治を売った女	April 10, 1978
14	A Dream At The Awa Festival	夢に追われて阿波踊り	April 17, 1978
15	The Sound Of Crying Bells	女の鈴が哭いた	April 24, 1978
16	The Naked Crybaby Assassin	裸の泣き虫役人	May 1, 1978
17	The Prostitute Flower On A Foggy Night	霜夜の女郎花	May 8, 1978
18	Road of Manure	こやし道	May 15, 1978
19	The Gift	めの字の置きみやげ	May 22, 1978

== Season 4 [1979] ==
No.	Title	Japanese	Original Air Date
1	Another Solitary Journey	今日も行くひとり旅	April 16, 1979
2	Winter Fireworks	冬の花火	April 23, 1979
3	Ichi Hears His Song	市の耳に子守唄	May 7, 1979
4	I Will Kill Him Tomorrow	あした斬る	May 14, 1979
5	Journey of the Butterfly	ふたおもて蝶の道行	May 21, 1979
6	The Spinning Wheel	糸ぐるま	May 28, 1979
7	The Promise	ゆびきりげんまん	June 11, 1979
8	The Big Win of 1,000 Ryo	大当たり、めの一番	June 18, 1979
9	The Boathouse on a Rainy Day	雨の船宿	June 25, 1979
10	Ichi's Bowl	市の茶碗	July 2, 1979
11	The Stage of Compassion	人情まわり舞台	July 9, 1979
12	The Rainbow Bridge	虹のかけ橋	July 23, 1979
13	The 100 Ryo Gift that the Demon Laughed at	鬼が笑う百両みやげ	July 30, 1979
14	The Protégé Masseur	あんま志願	August 6, 1979
15	The Scarecrow	かかしっ子	August 13, 1979
16	Greetings and Farewell Lights	迎え火 送り火 灯篭流し	August 20, 1979
17	This Child, Whose Is It?	この子誰の子	August 27, 1979
18	Traveling With A Dog	犬と道連れ	September 3, 1979
19	The Peaceful Life	静かなくらし	September 10, 1979
20	Pinwheel And The Festival	祭りばやしに風車	September 17, 1979
21	The Yakuza's song, part 1	渡世人の詩・前篇	October 15, 1979
22	The Yakuza's song, part 2	渡世人の詩・後編	October 22, 1979
23	The Mysterious Travel	不思議な旅	October 29, 1979
24	The Sun	おてんとさん	November 5, 1979
25	The Rainbow Journey	虹の旅	November 12, 1979
26	The Dream Journey	夢の旅	November 19, 1979
