= Hanzo the Razor =

Japanese fictional character

Hanzo the Razor (かみそり 半蔵, Kamisori Hanzō) is a fictional character featured in the trilogy of Japanese chanbara films of the same name originating in the manga series Goyōkiba by Kazuo Koike and Takeshi Kanda. The original three films star Shintaro Katsu as the title character. He also produced the trilogy through his own Katsu Productions.

== History ==
After the decline of Daiei at the end of the 1960s, Shintaro Katsu established his own independent production company in 1967 called Katsu Productions, forming a partnership wih Toho. In 1972, Katsu Productions released the chanbara film trilogy with the Hanzo the Razor: Sword of Justice based on a gekiga by Koike Kazuo.

The film series is about an incorruptible law enforcer during the Edo period, who has a strong sense of justice which dictates his every move. The film incorporates elements of exploitation film, and is highly sexual: Hanzo has an outlandishly large penis which is a recurring theme, and he uses it to interrogate women, usually by rape, to reveal a case's hidden secrets and truths.

In 1994, a made-for-TV reboot, directed by Akira Inoue, starred Ken Watanabe as Hanzo, toning down the exploitation elements of the '70s films to focus on a hard-boiled narrative of political corruption and personal vengeance.

== Films ==
Official English title	Japanese title	Japanese release date	Ref(s)
Hanzo the Razor: Sword of Justice	御用牙 (Goyōkiba)	30 December 1972	
Hanzo the Razor: The Snare	御用牙 かみそり半蔵地獄責め (Goyōkiba: Kamisori Hanzō jigoku zeme)	11 August 1973	
Hanzo the Razor: Who's Got the Gold?	御用牙 鬼の半蔵やわ肌小判 (Goyōkiba: Oni no Hanzō yawahada koban)	9 February 1974	

== Recurring cast and characters ==
List indicator
- This table only includes characters which have appeared in more than one film.
- A dark grey cell indicates the character was not in the film, or that the character's presence in the film has not yet been announced.

Character	Film		
Character	Hanzo the Razor – Sword of Justice	Hanzo the Razor – The Snare	Hanzo the Razor – Who's Got the Gold?
Hanzo Itami The Razor	Shintaro Katsu	Shintaro Katsu	Shintaro Katsu

== Crew ==
Occupation	Film		
Occupation	Hanzo the Razor – Sword of Justice (1972)	Hanzo the Razor – The Snare (1973)	Hanzo the Razor – Who's Got the Gold? (1974)
Director	Kenji Misumi	Yasuzo Masumura	Yoshio Inoue
Producer(s)	Shintaro Katsu, Kozen Nishioka	Shintaro Katsu, Kozen Nishioka	Shintaro Katsu, Kozen Nishioka
Screenplay	Kazuo Koike	Yasuzo Masumura	Yasuzo Masumura
Composer(s)	Kunihiko Murai	Isao Tomita	Hideaki Sakurai
Director of photography	Jishi Makiura	Kazuro Miyagawa	Jishi Makiura
Editor(s)	—N/a	Toshio Taniguchi	—N/a
Ref(s)			
