= Yoshinobu Nishioka =

Japanese art director and film producer (1922–2019)

- Born: July 8, 1923
- Died: October 11, 2019 (aged 96)
- Occupation: Production designer

Yoshinobu Nishioka (西岡 善信, Nishioka Yoshinobu; July 8, 1923 – October 11, 2019) was a Japanese jidaigeki production designer, art director, producer and set decorator from Asuka, Nara Prefecture who won three Japan Academy Film Prize for Outstanding Achievement in Art Direction.

Nishioka joined Daiei Kyoto film in 1948. His first work as an art director was in the 1952 film Tenpo Suikoden. After the bankruptcy of Daiei film he founded Eizo Kyoto production with former employees of Daiei film.

== Selected works ==
=== Film ===
- Tenpo Suikoden (1952)
- Gate of Hell (1953)
- Enjō (1958)
- Echizen Takaningyo (1963)
- An Actor's Revenge (1963)
- Zatoichi on the Road (1963)
- Zatoichi and the Chest of Gold (1964)
- Zatoichi's Revenge (1965)
- Zatoichi's Vengeance (1966)
- Zatoichi's Pilgrimage (1966)
- Daimajin Strikes Again (1966)
- Zatoichi's Cane Sword (1967)
- Zatoichi the Outlaw (1967)
- The Yoshiwara Story (1968)
- Yokai Monsters: 100 Monsters (1968)
- Zatoichi Meets Yojimbo (1969)
- Hitokiri (1969)
- Onna Gokuakuchō (1970)
- Zatoichi Goes to the Fire Festival (1970)
- Zatoichi and the One-Armed Swordsman (1971)
- Lone Wolf and Cub: Baby Cart to Hades (1973)
- The Wanderers (1973)
- Death at an Old Mansion (1975) (Producer and Art director)
- Kinkaku-ji (1976)
- Bandits vs. Samurai Squadron (1978)
- Hunter in the Dark (1979)
- Onimasa (1982)
- The Geisha (1983)
- MacArthur's Children (1984)
- Fireflies in the North (1984)
- Gonza the Spearman (1986)
- Rikyu (1991)
- Rainbow Kids (1991)
- The Oil-Hell Murder (1992)
- Lone Wolf and Cub: Final Conflict (1993) (Executive producer and Art director)
- Crest of Betrayal (1994)
- Kura (1995)
- East Mets West (1995)
- Onihei's Detective Records (1995)
- Owls' Castle (1998)
- Gohatto (1999)
- Sennen no Koi Story of Genji (2001)
- Kāchan (2001)
- Dora-heita (2002) (Producer and Art director)
- Vengeance for Sale (2002)
- The Twilight Samurai (2002) (Supervising Production Designer)
- Azumi (2003)
- The Hidden Blade (2004)
- Baruto no Gakuen (2006)
- The Last Ronin (2010)

=== Television ===
- Kogarashi Monjirō (1972)
- The Abe Clan (1995) (TV Movie)
- Gokenin Zankurō (1997-2001)
- Kenkaku Shōbai (1998-2010)

== Awards ==
- Mainichi Film Award for Best Art Direction - Echizen Takningyo and An Actor's Revenge(1963)
- Mainichi Film Award for Best Art Direction - Yoshiwara Enjō, Hachiko Monogatari and The Man Who Assassinated Ryoma (1987)
- The Japanese Academy Award for "Best Art Direction" - Owls' Castle (2000)
- The Japanese Academy Award for "Best Art Direction" - Sennen no Koi Story of Genji (2002)
- The Japanese Academy Award for "Best Art Direction" - The Hidden Blade (2005)
- Medals of Honor (1992)
- Order of the Rising Sun 4th class (1997)
- Kawakita Eiga Award (2002)
