= Machibuse =

- Film poster
- Directed by: Hiroshi Inagaki
- Screenplay by: Kyu Fujiki; Hideo Oguni; Hajime Takaiwa; Ichiro Miyakawa
- Produced by: Toshiro Mifune
- Starring: Toshiro Mifune; Yujiro Ishihara; Ruriko Asaoka; Shintaro Katsu; Kinnosuke Nakamura
- Cinematography: Kazuo Yamada
- Edited by: Yoshihiro Araki
- Music by: Masaru Sato
- Production company: Mifune Productions
- Distributed by: Toho
- Release date: 29 April 1970 (Japan)
- Running time: 118 minutes
- Country: Japan

Machibuse (Japanese: 待ち伏せ) is a 1970 Japanese drama film directed by Hiroshi Inagaki.

== Plot ==
A ronin (Toshiro Mifune, often referred to as "yojimbo") is instructed to go to a mountain pass and await further instructions. On the way he rescues Okuni (Ruriko Asaoka), a woman abused by her husband. While at a roadside inn, the ronin meets several characters including the disgraced doctor, Gentetsu (Shintaro Katsu), a pompous police constable, and a criminal he has arrested. The ronin uncovers a plot for bandits to steal gold as it is being transported along the mountain pass. As Mifune's yojimbo had done in previous plots, he plays all sides and pretends to aid the bandits. At the end another layer to the scheme is uncovered, and the mastermind who dispatched the ronin and informed the bandits about the gold is the same person. There was never any gold, and it was all a ruse to have the bandits killed.

== Cast ==
- Toshiro Mifune − 'Yojimbo'
- Yujiro Ishihara − Yataro
- Ruriko Asaoka − Okuni
- Shintaro Katsu − Gentetsu
- Kinnosuke Nakamura − Heima Ibuki
- Chusha Ichikawa − Unknown Samurai

== Release ==
Machibuse was produced by Toshiro Mifune's production company and released in Japan by Toho on April 29, 1970. It was released by Toho International in the United States with English subtitles as The Ambush on December 18, 1970. The film was re-issued in 1971 under the title Machibuse. It is also known in English as Incident at Blood Pass.

Actors Toshiro Mifune and Shintaro Katsu performed in movies produced by each other. Earlier, in January of 1970, another film starring Mifune and Katsu was released, Zatoichi Meets Yojimbo. That film was produced by Katsu's own production company.

== Reception ==
Despite its big budget and the appearance of four of the country's biggest stars, the film was not a success.
