= Kenji Misumi =

Japanese film director (1921–1975)

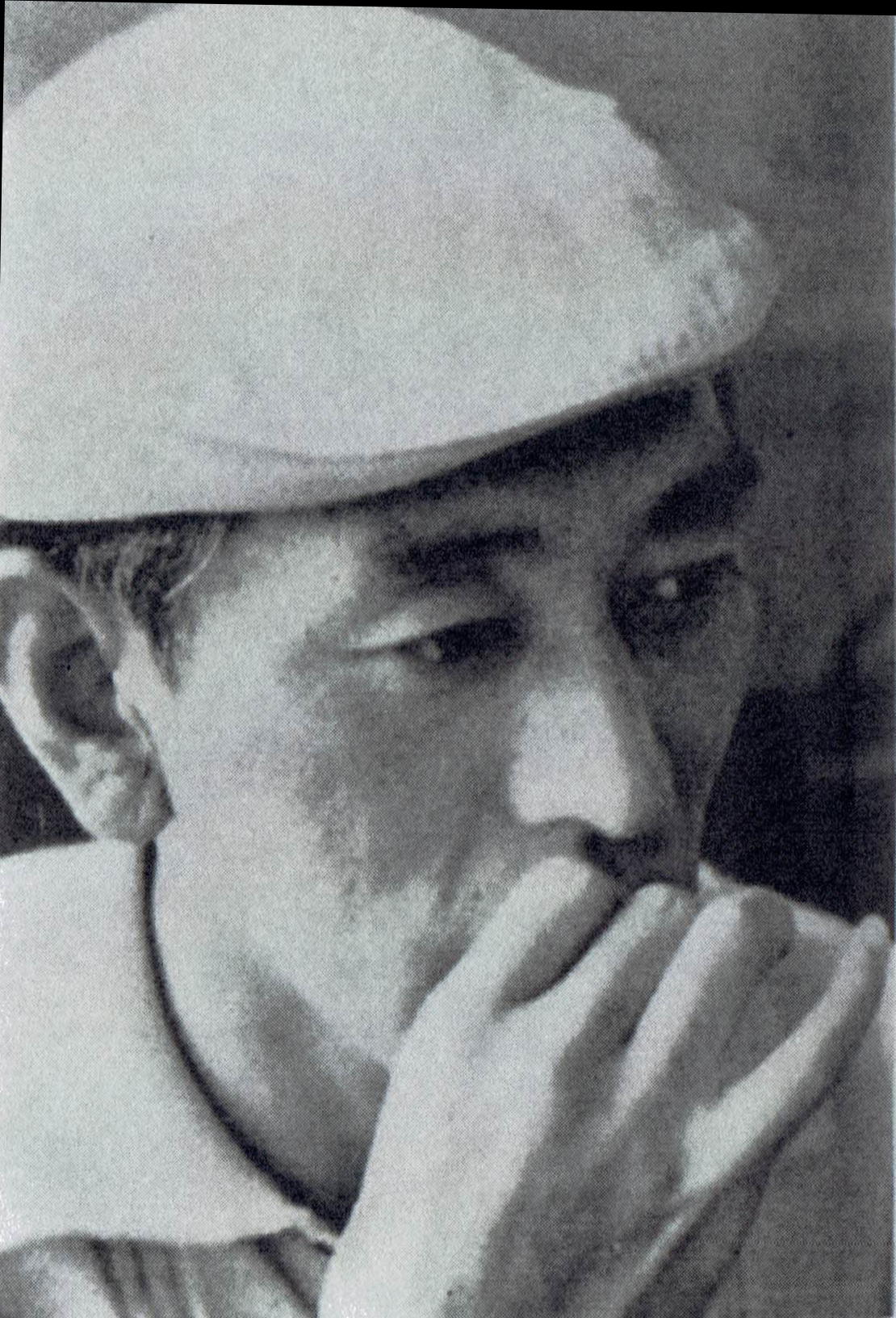
- Born: 2 March 1921; Kyoto, Japan
- Died: 24 September 1975 (aged 54)
- Occupation: Film director

Kenji Misumi (三隅 研次, Misumi Kenji) (2 March 1921 – 24 September 1975) was a Japanese film director. He created film series such as Lone Wolf and Cub and the initial film in the long-running Zatoichi series, and also directed Hanzo the Razor: Sword of Justice, starring Shintaro Katsu. He died at age 54.

In 2012, his 1973 film Sakura no Daimon was voted for by Makoto Shinozaki at the BFI The Top 50 Greatest Films of All Time.

== Biography ==
Kenji Misumi was born on March 2, 1921. His father was a Kobe entrepreneur Fukujiro Misumi and his mother was a geisha from Kyoto's pleasure district who went by the name Shizu. The parents were not in a formal relationship and neither parent wanted to take care of Kenji. This led to him being taken care of by his aunt Shika with Fukujiro financially supporting him. This led to Kenji Misumi later being enrolled in the Ritsumeikan business school. Kenji was more interested in film, specifically chanbara films with actors like Tsumasaburo Bando and Denjiro Okochi, which led him to tell his father that he wanted to pursue arts and work in film. This led to his father cutting his allowance severing their last ties together.

Misumi continued his studies at Ritsumeikan as well as beginning work at his Aunt's restaurant. While working there, he entered into conversation about cinema with novelist and playwright Kan Kikuchi who slipped him contact information with Nikkatsu Studios. Two years after this, Misumi went to his contact at Nikkatsu finding that the person no longer was employed there. The recommendation from Kikuchi was enough to have him enter employment at Nikkatsu however, allowing him to start work as trainee assistant director in 1941. Before Misumi began work on any project, he was drafted into World War II. Misumi spoke little of his war time experiences. He was taken as a prisoner of war by Russians and sent to Siberia where he remained for two and a half years. He was sent back to Japan in 1948 where he re-entered the film industry.

=== Film career ===
The film industry in Japan had changed after World War II with Nikkatsu having been absorbed into the structure of Daiei where Misumi sought employment and was hired as an assistant director. Misumi worked on two films for director Kozaburo Yoshimura, The Tale of Genji and Sisters of Nishijin. Misumi spent his spare time during this period watching other directors at work and watching films. Misumi began a friendship with director Teinosuke Kinugasa, assisting him on his films Dedication of the Great Buddha and Gate of Hell, which led to Kinugasa personally asking Daiei's head Masaichi Nagata to promote Misumi to a director position. Misumi was promoted with his first film being Tange Sazen: Kokezaru no tsubo (lit. 'Tange Sazen: The Moss Monkey's Jar'), a third film in a trilogy about a one-armed and one-eyed samurai portrayed by Okochi. The film was very successful being the second highest-grossing film in domestically in Japan that year. Misumi followed it with further chanbara films, averaging about four films per year.

Misumi's films has continued success at the box office in Japan which led him to direct more features often with the same crew. The crew included assistant director Toshinori Tomoeda, cinematographer Chishi Makirua, film editor Kanji Suganuma, and production designer Akira Naito. Misumi stayed loyal with Daiei early in his career, even turning down an offer to work for Toei. One of Misumi's projects became Japan's first 70 mm film with Buddha, the film was a very expensive feature that became the highest-grossing film that year in Japan in 1961. Misumi was offered by Nagata to direct more prestigious films for Daiei, but Misumi continued working on chanbara films, including directing the first entry in the Zatoichi film series with The Tale of Zatoichi released in 1962. Misumi would direct several chanbara films in the 1960s including films in the Zatoichi series.

Misumi was released from his contract with Daiei in 1971 when the studio shut down film production. Misumi had already made Zatoichi at the Fire Festival the previous year for Katsu Productions and made his debut in television with the series Tenno no seiki in 1971, following it up with the first entry in the Lone Wolf and Cub series with Lone Wolf and Cub: Sword of Vengeance again for Katsu. After directing three films in the Lone Wolf and Cub series, Misumi began work for Katsu Productions on the Hanzo the Razor series. Following work on the television jidaigeki series Hissatsu series in 1973 (Misumi directed 19 episodes in the "Hissatsu series".), Misumi began work on The Last Samurai for Shochiku. It would be his last film as Misumi died of liver failure on September 24, 1975.

== Selected filmography ==
Year	Title	Credited as		Ref(s)
Year	Title	Director	Assistant Director	Ref(s)
1952	Dedication of the Great Buddha		Yes	
1953	Gate of Hell		Yes	
1959	The Ghost of Yotsuya	Yes		
1960	Satan's Sword	Yes		
1960	Satan's Sword II	Yes		
1961	Satan's Sword III	Yes		
1961	Buddha	Yes		
1962	The Tale of Zatoichi	Yes		
1963	Nyokei Kazoku	Yes		
1964	Fight, Zatoichi, Fight	Yes		
1965	Zatoichi and the Chess Expert	Yes		
1966	The Return of the Giant Majin	Yes		
1967	Zatoichi Challenged	Yes		
1968	Samaritan Zatoichi	Yes		
1969	Devil's Temple	Yes		
1970	Zatoichi Goes to the Fire Festival	Yes		
1972	Lone Wolf and Cub: Sword of Vengeance	Yes		
1972	Lone Wolf and Cub: Baby Cart at the River Styx	Yes		
1972	Lone Wolf and Cub: Baby Cart to Hades	Yes		
1972	Hanzo the Razor: Sword of Justice	Yes		
1973	Sakura no daimon	Yes		
1973	Lone Wolf and Cub: Baby Cart in the Land of Demons	Yes		
1974	The Last Samurai	Yes		

=== Television ===
Show	Premiere date	Channel	Episode	Notes	Ref(s)
Hissatsu Shiokiya Kagyō	1975	Asahi Broadcasting Corporation	Episode 13	Misumi's final work	
