= Dainichi Eihai =

Japanese film studio

- Company type: Private KK
- Industry: Motion pictures
- Founded: June 1970
- Defunct: August 1971
- Fate: Assets incorporated into Kadokawa Pictures and Nikkatsu
- Headquarters: Japan
- Area served: Japan
- Key people: Hideo Matsuyama (President), Shigezo Tsubota (Manager)
- Parent: Daiei Film, Nikkatsu

Dainichi Film Distribution Co., Ltd (ＤＮ ダイニチ映配株式会社, Dainichi Eihai Kabushiki gaisha), or simply Dainichi Eihai (ダイニチ映配, Dainichi Eihai), was a Japanese film studio. It was active from June 1970 to August 1971.

== History ==
In the late 1960s Daiei Film began to experience financial problems; in June 1970 Daiei and Nikkatsu merged to share distribution costs to combat financial problems and formed Dainichi Eihai. The partnership between Daiei and Nikkatsu lasted until August 1971, when Nikkatsu withdrew from the deal leaving Daiei Film to face bankruptcy, the company later was purchased by Tokuma Shoten in 1974 and later was re-purchased by Kadokawa Shoten Publishing creating Kadokawa Daiei Studio.

== Filmography ==
- Blind Woman's Curse (1970)
- Zatoichi Goes to the Fire Festival (1970)
- Blood For Blood (1971)
- Gokuraku bozu (1971)
- Wet Sand in August (1971)
- Gamera vs. Zigra (1971)
- Suzunosuke Akado: The Birdman with Three Eyes (1958; 1971 re-release)
- Zatoichi and the One-Armed Swordsman (1971)
- Kanto Destruction (1971)
- Kimi wa umi o mita ka (1971)
- Hiroku Nagasaki onna-ro (1971)
- Hiding-Place in the Storm (1971)
- Yoru no shinsatsushitsu (1971)
- Games (1971)
