= Shintaro Katsu =

Japanese actor (1931–1997)

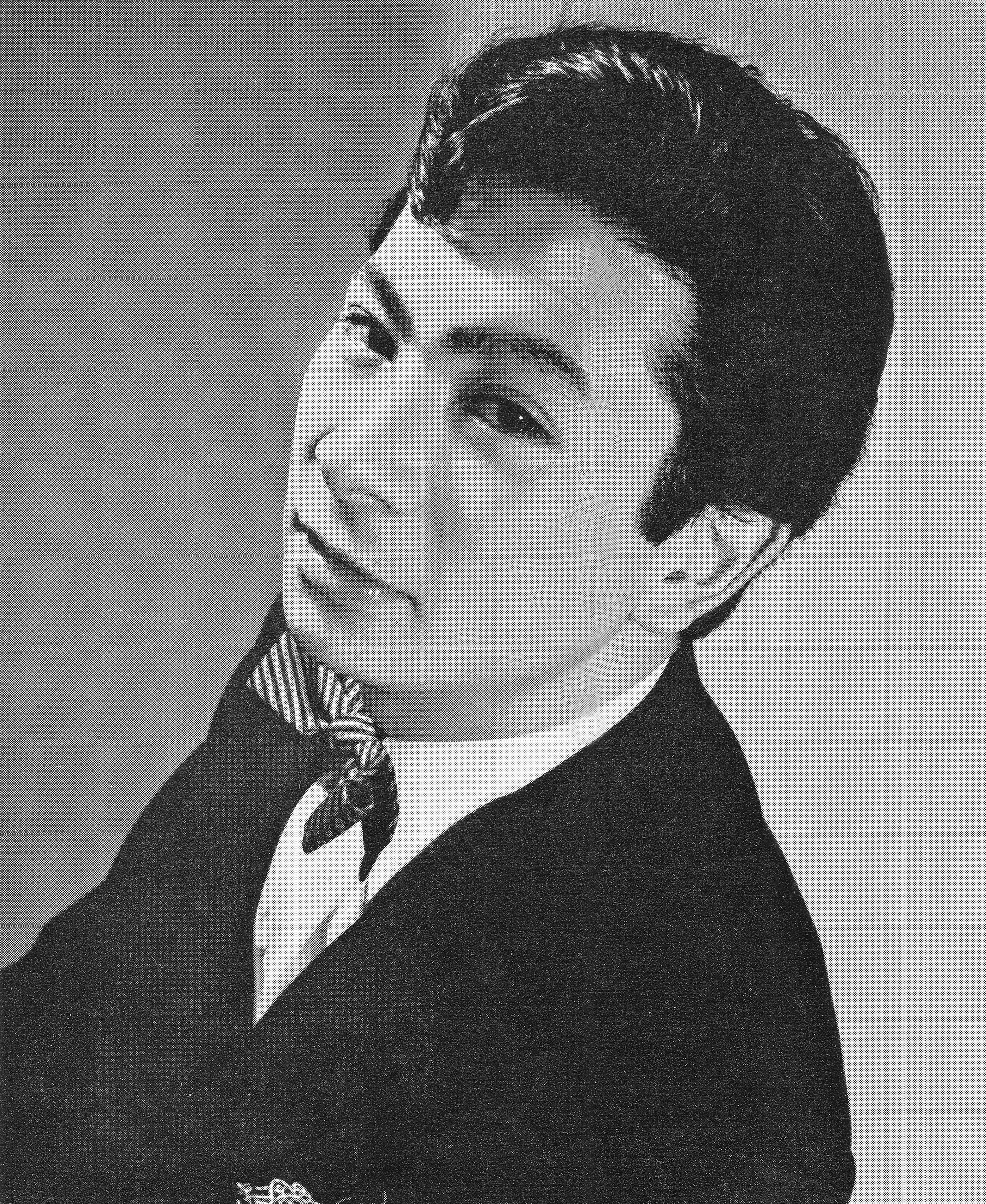
- (Shintaro Katsu in 1955)
- Born: Toshio Okumura; 29 November 1931; Chiba, Chiba Prefecture, Japan
- Died: 21 June 1997 (aged 65); Kashiwa, Chiba, Japan
- Occupations: Actor, singer, producer, writer and director
- Years active: 1954–1997
- Spouse: Tamao Nakamura
- Relatives: Tomisaburo Wakayama (brother)
- Website: https://katsushintaro.com/

Shintaro Katsu (Japanese: 勝 新太郎, Hepburn: Katsu Shintarō; 29 November 1931 – 21 June 1997) was a Japanese actor, singer, and filmmaker. He is known for starring in the Akumyo series, the Hoodlum Soldier series, the Hanzo the Razor series, and the Zatoichi series.

== Life and career ==
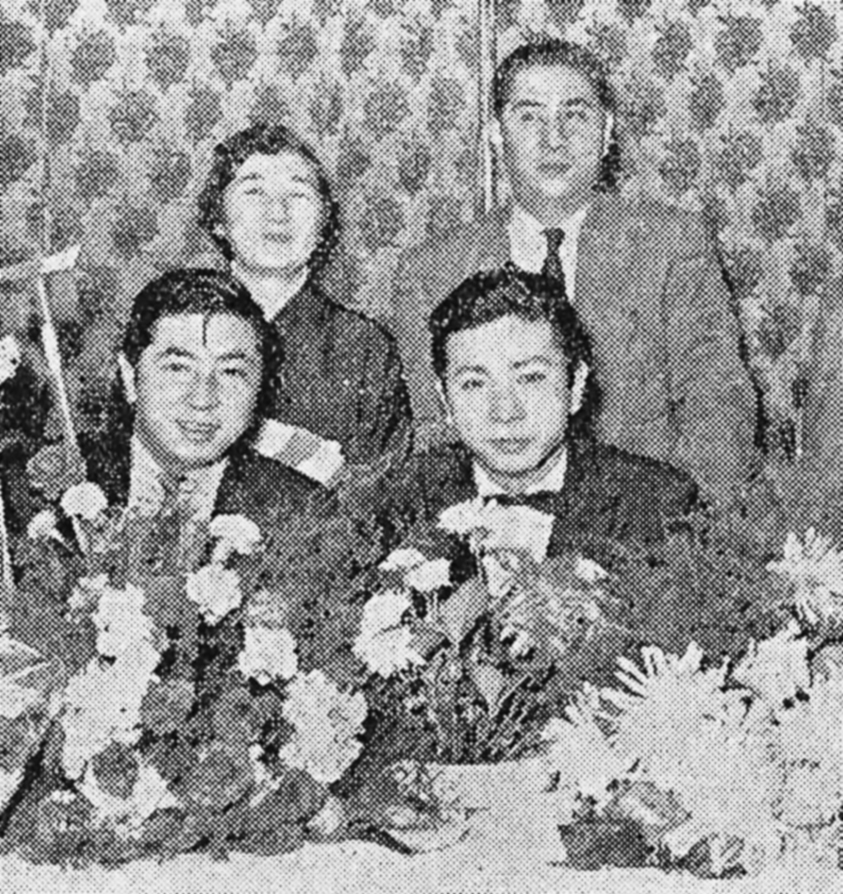
Shintaro Katsu with his entire family—his parents and older brother—at the inauguration tea party of The Supporters' Association for Shintaro Katsu in Tokyo, 1956.

Born Toshio Okumura (奥村 利夫 Okumura Toshio) on 29 November 1931. Shortly after his birth in Chiba, he was brought to the Okumura family's ancestral home in Fukagawa, Tokyo, where he was raised. He was the son of Minoru Okumura (奥村 実), a noted kabuki performer who went by the stage name Katsutōji Kineya (杵屋 勝東治) and who was renowned for his nagauta and shamisen skills. He was the younger brother of actor Tomisaburo Wakayama.

Shintaro Katsu began his career in entertainment as a shamisen player. He switched to acting because he noticed it was better paid. In the 1960s he starred simultaneously in three long-running series of films, the Akumyo series, the Hoodlum Soldier series, and the Zatoichi series.

He played the role of blind masseur Zatoichi in a series of 25 films between 1962 and 1973, in 100 episodes across a four season television series from 1974 to 1979, and in a 26th and final film in 1989, which he also directed.

In 1967, Katsu formed the company Katsu Productions.

In 1972, Katsu Productions released the initial chanbara film in a trilogy with the Hanzo the Razor: Sword of Justice based on a gekiga by Koike Kazuo. Hanzo the Razor: The Snare would be released in 1973, and Hanzo the Razor: Who's Got the Gold? in 1974.

Katsu had a troubled personal life. A heavy drinker, Katsu had several brushes with the law over drug use as well, including marijuana, opium and cocaine with arrests in 1978, 1990 and 1992.

He had also developed a reputation as a troublemaker on set. When director Akira Kurosawa cast him for the lead role in Kagemusha (1980), Katsu left before the first day of shooting was over. Though accounts differ as to the incident, the most consistent one details Katsu's clash with Kurosawa regarding bringing his own film crew to the set (to film Kurosawa in action for later exhibition to his own acting students). Kurosawa is reputed to have taken great offense at this, resulting in Katsu's termination (he was replaced by Tatsuya Nakadai). In her book, Waiting on the Weather, about her experiences with director Kurosawa, script supervisor Teruyo Nogami chalks the differences between Katsu and Kurosawa up to a personality clash that had unfortunate artistic results.

He was the husband of actress Tamao Nakamura (married in 1962), and father of actor Ryutaro Gan (Gan Ryūtarō).

Stunt actor Yukio Kato was killed on the set of the 26th Zatoichi film by Katsu's son, who was co-starring, when an actual sword was mistaken for a prop, fatally wounding Kato.

In her biographical book The Flower Warfare of Geisha Mineko, Kyoto geisha Mineko Iwasaki disclosed her relationship with Katsu (whom she referred to by his given name, Toshio). Spanning from 1965 to 1976, it was an 11-year relationship encompassing a six-year courtship and a five-year romance. The two eventually restored a close friendship that lasted until his death.

Katsu produced the manga-based Lone Wolf and Cub (Kozure Okami) series of jidaigeki films starring his brother Tomisaburo Wakayama, two of which were later compiled into the movie Shogun Assassin, as well as co-writing, producing, and acting alongside his brother in the TV jidaigeki series Oshizamurai Kiichihōgan (Mute Samurai) and Tsūkai! Kōchiyama Sōshun.

His other television work includes the police drama Keishi-K (Superintendent K) which he starred in (as Katsutoshi Gatsu), co-wrote, directed, and produced. His daughter, Masami Okumura, co-starred.

His film work includes the Hanzo the Razor series as Detective Itami Hanzo. He was also an accomplished shamisen player, as well as a vocalist, recording several albums in both pop and Enka.

He died of pharyngeal cancer on 21 June 1997.

== Personal life ==
=== Religion ===
Shintaro Katsu practiced Nichiren Buddhism, and both his family and personal life were bound by a deep connection with the sect.

The Okumura family possessed a statue of Nichiren Shonin carved from highly flammable white sandalwood. Near the end of the Pacific War, the Okumura residence in Tokyo was completely destroyed by American air raids, leading the family to believe the statue had been lost to the fire. However, when Katsu and his mother evacuated to Nikko, the statue miraculously appeared inside his clothing bag without anyone having placed it there, becoming his mother's spiritual support during their gruelling period of evacuation. After the war, the newly built residence of the Okumura family was struck by another major fire and reduced to ashes. Once again, the statue survived completely unscathed and was discovered by Katsu in the ruins. Deeply shaken by this miracle, his father devoutly believed in Nichiren Buddhism from that day forward.

Just before Katsu entered the film industry, a Buddhist monk named Reiko Ueda told him, "You will become a pillar. You will become a pillar of the film industry. The statue of Nichiren is backing you up; it has entered your body. Though waves of extreme volatility will crash through your life ahead, you will become a central pillar." Katsu chanted the sect's sacred Daimoku, "(Namu) Myōhō Renge Kyō," in his films, such as Samaritan Zatoichi (1968) and Osho (1973). Furthermore, when facing moments of danger or terror in his personal life, he would clasp his hands in prayer and chant "Namu Myōhō Renge Kyō."

=== Marital relations ===
==== From First Meeting to Engagement (1940s–1961) ====
Shintaro Katsu and Tamao Nakamura had known each other since Tamao was still a schoolgirl. In 1955, Katsu and Tamao, who were both under Daiei Film Co., Ltd. at the time, made their first appearance together in the film The Cancan Insect Sings. Although they continued to co-star in numerous subsequent films, Katsu later recalled, "I never had a single thought that I would end up marrying Tamao-chan."

Originally, Tamao had been deeply in love with her childhood friend Raizo Ichikawa, who was already a top star at Daiei. Masaichi Nagata, president of Daiei, also actively promoted marriage arrangements between Raizo and Tamao as a union between two prestigious families of Kansai Kabuki (Tamao's father was Nakamura Ganjiro II, heir to a prominent Kansai Kabuki lineage). However, Raizo showed no romantic interest in Tamao and made it clear that he had no intention of taking her as his wife. Under these circumstances, Katsu and Tamao co-starred in the 1960 film Shiranui Kengyo (The Blind Menace). During their intense clash of acting on set, Katsu found himself drawn to Tamao's feminine charm and inner resilience.

Originally, Katsu had sought to marry a "pure, non-feisty woman." According to Katsu, while they were dating in secret, he felt that Tamao was giving her all to marry him, and during their relationship, her cheerful compliance—always responding to whatever he said with "Yes, yes"—sounded extremely pleasant to his ears. However, at the time, not only did the media continuously report on a romance between Tamao and Raizo for months (or up to a year according to one account), but public rumors of their impending marriage were also widespread. Katsu himself was fully aware that Tamao held affection for Raizo. Furthermore, hearing rumors that Masaichi Nagata and Nakamura Ganjiro—unaware of the secret dating—were still scheming to marry Tamao off to Raizo, Katsu's sense of rivalry and possessiveness was ignited, which led him to propose to Tamao in a manner that snatched her away.

Unexpectedly and surprisingly, around the time of their engagement in 1961 (or "the very next day following their engagement" according to another account), Katsu realized that their personalities were fundamentally incompatible. This realization struck him as Tamao's feisty nature became exposed, prompting Katsu to later recall his mindset at that moment: "It seems I made a mistake (in choosing her)." At the time, Katsu further felt that, in contrast to his own impulsive and direct nature, Tamao possessed an elusive, hard-to-grasp inner side. (Note: In a 1996 interview during the stage run of Sweet and Sour Matrimony: Tokyo Man and Kyoto Woman, Katsu revealed that he had felt they were incompatible starting from the day after their engagement. Speaking about himself (a Tokyo man) and Tamao (a Kyoto woman), he remarked, "There is nothing more mismatched than a Tokyo man and a Kyoto woman." He illustrated this with a metaphor: "In Tokyo, even if a house has a grand entrance, opening the door leads straight out to the back. In Kyoto, the entrance is tiny, but when you enter as they say, 'It's dirty, but please come in,' there are rooms stretching deep inside. The depth is completely different—and so are the people.")

==== Marriage and Relentless Discord (1962–1970) ====
On March 7, 1962, the couple held their wedding ceremony at the Imperial Hotel in Tokyo. However, their views on family were entirely different. Katsu loathed tranquility and could not stand the domestic atmosphere, stating that he could only be satisfied by constantly moving around; in contrast, Tamao yearned to establish an ideal family. Furthermore, their vastly different economic concepts rendered them incompatible. At the time of their marriage, relatives and friends remarked, "A colander and a tightly bound pouch have married." As they said, shortly after the marriage, Tamao regretted marrying an outrageous person, and Katsu himself also revealed that marrying Tamao was a mistake.

Within the very year of their marriage (1962), the couple began to quarrel, and Tamao returned to her parents' home repeatedly. In the following year, 1963, Katsu moved out of the house and resided regularly at the Hotel Fujita in Kyoto, and the two began living separately. After this, the two quarreled intensely, and it turned into a "regular league match." Around 1964, Katsu expressed an intention to divorce Tamao but was dissuaded by close associates and reconsidered. In 1965, the marital crisis became exposed to the public through the media, but it ultimately came to nothing.

According to numerous published reports, Tamao managed Katsu in crowded public places, and challenged Katsu or competed for victory in various aspects of daily life. Furthermore, she lost her temper in professional social settings due to marital dissatisfaction, trampling Katsu's dignity and leaving him behind to depart alone; moreover, after scaring off the guests at their home late at night, she fiercely slapped Katsu across the face with blazing fury. Katsu neither felt Tamao as a woman nor recognized her as his spouse. Meanwhile, Katsu, who was well-known for being popular among women, was rumored to have affairs. While Tamao loathed his unfaithfulness, Katsu regularly encouraged Tamao to commit adultery herself—the two stood opposed in their perceptions of companionship and fidelity.

==== The 1971 Divorce Declaration and Separate Lifestyles (1970s) ====
For the sake of their children attending an international school to properly learn English, Tamao moved with their two children from Kyoto to Yokohama, while Katsu had to remain in Kyoto for work. The two lived in different locations, adding a further layer of complexity to this marriage.

On the night of August 17, 1971, at the Katsu Production office in Roppongi, Tokyo, Tamao's interference in company business caused a heated argument between Katsu and Tamao. When Tamao proposed a separation, Katsu stated, "I have been waiting for those words for ten years," and immediately notified reporters to announce a "divorce declaration." Afterward, Katsu went abroad for performances, during which period Tamao consistently insisted that she would not divorce.

After weeks of turmoil, it is said that Tamao knelt and kowtowed before Katsu to apologize, pleading, "No matter what, please let me stay." Katsu replied, "I am not going to change my lifestyle." On September 13, 1971, Katsu issued a declaration dissolving the divorce; on the same day, Tamao held a solitary press conference, stating, "I am filled with a sense of self-reflection. From now on, I want to do my utmost for my husband." Only then did this divorce controversy come to an end.

Afterward, the two tried to avoid conflict, and Katsu did not travel with Tamao. Even when they needed to travel abroad together for social purposes, they would travel to the airport in separate cars; this was to avoid situations where they could not go together and return together due to arguing inside the car. Katsu expressed that once filming began for television dramas such as Zatoichi, they lived separately and he did not return home even once in half a year; he stated, "Since we do not see each other often, it is quite good," and that "even though we are a couple, each has their own world."

==== Bankruptcy of Katsu Production and Successive Crises (1980s) ====
In September 1981, Katsu Production went bankrupt due to massive debts. According to reports, Tamao, who was one of the directors, proposed a divorce, to which Katsu roared, "Are you abandoning me?" Ultimately, Katsu vowed to make a comeback as an actor, and Tamao assumed the position of president to tide over the crisis. Subsequently, in March 1982, their children were arrested on suspicion of violating the Cannabis Control Act. After the couple engaged in a fierce conflict regarding educational methods and responsibility, it was reported that Tamao proposed a divorce with a separation method where "the son goes to the father, and the daughter goes to the mother." A state of cold war between the couple had reportedly persisted since then.

==== Later Years Together and the End (1990s) ====
In the 1990s, Katsu consistently rejected offers to play supporting roles in films; with his film work and economic activities largely stagnant, he lived on the assistance of friends. During this period, although there were conflicts as before, the two lived together as a couple in their apartment in Tokyo. In 1996, to celebrate the birthday of Katsu's close friend, the painter Balthus, the couple made their first and final trip together as just the two of them (a Swiss trip of about two days).

Tamao had previously proposed multiple projects to play the leading role in films directed by Katsu, but none came to fruition. The final time she was recognized by Katsu as an actress was in the 1996 stage play Meoto Zenzai (Marital Relations) which they performed together; however, during the tour of the show, Katsu was discovered to have cancer.

Although Tamao achieved massive success on variety television programs since 1994, Katsu did not financially rely on his wife. During his recuperation period, Katsu gave his father's heirloom (katami) shamisen as a token of gratitude to the sponsor who was willing to continuously sign checks and provide financial aid until the very end. On June 21, 1997, Katsu passed away before Tamao's eyes. It was as Tamao stated, "Just when I felt we had become like a real married couple finally, he died."

== Filmography ==
=== As actor ===
Year	Title	Japanese	Romanization	Character
1955	A Girl Isn't Allowed to Love	薔薇いくたびか	Bara ikutabika	Akira Takakura
1956	Migratory Birds of the Flowers	花の渡り鳥	Hana no Wataridori	
1956	The Renyasai Yagyu Hidden Story	柳生連也斎 秘伝月影抄	Yagyū Ren'yasai Hidentsuki Kageshō	
1956	Sisters of the Gion	祇園の姉妹	Gion no shimai	
1956		まらそん侍	Marason zamurai	
1956	Ghost-Cat of Gojusan-Tsugi	怪猫五十三次	Kaibyo Gojusan-tsugi	
1956		月形半平太	Tsukigata Hanpeita	
1957	An Osaka Story	大阪物語	Osaka monogatari	
1957		二十九人の喧嘩状	Nijūkyū-nin no Kenka-jō	
1957	Ghost Cat of Yonaki Swamp	怪猫夜泣き沼	Kaibyo Yonaki numa	
1958	Nichiren and the Great Mongol Invasion	日蓮と蒙古大襲来	Nichiren to mōko daishūrai	
1958	The Gay Masquerade	弁天小僧	Benten kozō	
1958	The Loyal 47 Ronin	忠臣蔵	Chūshingura	
1958	Ghost-Cat Wall of Hatred	怪猫呪いの壁	Kaibyō noroi no kabe	
1959	Samurai Vendetta	薄桜記	Hakuōki	
1959		関の弥太っぺ	Seki no yatappe	
1959		紅あざみ	Beni azami	
1959	Beauty Is Guilty	美貌に罪あり	Bibō ni tsumi ari	
1959		初春狸御殿	Hatsuharu tanuki gotten	
1960		続次郎長富士	Zoku Jirocho Fuji	
1960	The Demon of Mount Oe	大江山酒呑童子	Ooe-yama Shuten-dōji	Watanabe no Tsuna
1960	Secrets of a Court Masseur also titled The Blind Menace and Agent Shiranui	不知火檢校	Shiranui kengyō	
1960		月の出の決闘	Tsukinode no ketto	
1961		水戸黄門海を渡る	Mito komon umi o wataru	
1961		風と雲と砦	Kaze to kumo to toride	
1961		花くらべ狸道中	Hanakurabe tanuki dochu	
1961	Blind Devotion	みだれ髪	Midaregami	
1961	Tough Guy	悪名	Akumyō	Asakichi
1961	Buddha	釈迦	Shaka	Devadatta
1961	Tough Guy, Part 2	続悪名	Zoku akumyo	Asakichi
1962	The Whale God	鯨神	Kujira gami	
1962	The Tale of Zatoichi	座頭市物語	Zatōichi monogatari	Ichi
1962	New Bad Reputation	新悪名	Shin akumyo	Asakichi
1962	The Great Wall	秦・始皇帝	Shin no shikōtei	
1962	The Tale of Zatoichi Continues	続・座頭市物語	Zoku Zatōichi monogatari	Ichi
1962	New Bad Reputation Continues	続・新悪名	Zoku shin akumyo	Asakichi
1963	The Money Dance	ど根性物語 銭の踊り	Dokonjo monogatari – zeni no odori	
1963		第三の悪名	Daisan no akumyo	Asakichi
1963	An Actor's Revenge	雪之丞変化	Yukinojo henge	
1963	New Tale of Zatoichi	新・座頭市物語	Shin Zatōichi monogatari	Ichi
1963		悪名市場	Akumyo ichiba	Asakichi
1963	Zatoichi The Fugitive	座頭市兇状旅	Zatōichi kyojo tabi	Ichi
1963		悪名波止場	Akumyo hatoba	Asakichi
1963	Zatoichi on the Road	座頭市喧嘩旅	Zatōichi kenka-tabi	Ichi
1963		悪名一番	Akumyo ichiban	Asakichi
1964	Zatoichi and the Chest of Gold	座頭市千両首	Zatōichi senryō-kubi	Ichi
1964		駿河遊侠伝 賭場荒し	Suruga yūkyōden: Toba arashi	
1964	Zatoichi's Flashing Sword	座頭市あばれ凧	Zatōichi abare tako	Ichi
1964		悪名太鼓	Akumyo daiko	Asakichi
1964		駿河遊侠伝 破れ鉄火	Suruga yūkyōden yabure tekka	
1964	Fight, Zatoichi, Fight	座頭市血笑旅	Zatōichi kesshō-tabi	Ichi
1964	Kojiki Taishō	乞食大将	Kojiki taisho	Gotō Matabei
1964	If You're Happy, Clap Your Hands	幸せなら手をたたこう	Shiawasa nara te wo tatakou	
1964	Adventures of Zatoichi	座頭市関所破り	Zatōichi sekisho yaburi	Ichi
1964			Rōnin-gai	
1964		ど根性物語 図太い奴	Dokonjō monogatari: Zubutoiyatsu	
1965		駿河遊侠伝 度胸がらす	Suruga yūkyōden: Dokyō garasu	
1965	The Hoodlum Soldier	兵隊やくざ	Heitai yakuza	Kisaburo Omiya
1965	Zatoichi's Revenge	座頭市二段斬り	Zatōichi nidan-kiri	Ichi
1965			Akumyo nobori	Asakichi
1965	Life of Matsu the Untamed	無法松の一生	Muhomatsu no issho	
1965	Zatoichi and the Doomed Man	座頭市逆手斬り	Zatōichi sakate giri	Ichi
1965		悪名無敵	Akumyo muteki	Asakichi
1965	Zatoichi and the Chess Expert	座頭市地獄旅	Zatōichi Jigoku tabi	Ichi
1965	Hoodlum Soldier and the C.O.	続・兵隊やくざ	Zoku heitai yakuza	Ichi
1966		悪名桜	Akumyo zakura	Asakichi
1966	Zatoichi's Vengeance	座頭市の歌が聞える	Zatōichi no uta ga kikoeru	Ichi
1966	Zatoichi's Pilgrimage	座頭市海を渡る	Zatōichi umi o wataru	Ichi
1966	Hoodlum Soldier Deserts Again	新・兵隊やくざ	Shin heitai yakuza	
1966		兵隊やくざ 脱獄	Heitai yakuza datsugoku	
1966		兵隊やくざ 大脱走	Heitai yakuza daidassō	
1967	The Hoodlum Priest	やくざ坊主	Yakuza bozu	
1967		兵隊やくざ 俺にまかせろ	Heitai yakuza ore ni makasero	
1967	Zatoichi's Cane Sword	座頭市鉄火旅	Zatōichi tekka tabi	Ichi
1967		悪名一代	Akumyo ichidai	Asakichi
1967	Zatoichi the Outlaw	座頭市牢破り	Zatōichi rōyaburi	Ichi
1967	Hoodlum Soldier on the Attack	兵隊やくざ 殴り込み	Heitai yakuza nagurikomi	
1967	Zatoichi Challenged	座頭市血煙り街道	Zatōichi chikemuri kaidō	Ichi
1968		続やくざ坊主	Zoku yakuza bozu	
1968		とむらい師たち	Tomuraishi tachi	
1968		兵隊やくざ 強奪	Heitai yakuza godatsu	
1968		悪名十八番	Akumyo juhachi-ban	Asakichi
1968	The Man Without a Map	燃えつきた地図	Moetsukita chizu	
1968	Zatoichi and the Fugitives	座頭市果し状	Zatōichi hatashi-jō	Ichi
1968	Samaritan Zatoichi	座頭市喧嘩太鼓	Zatōichi kenka-daiko	Ichi
1969	Devil's Temple	鬼の棲む館	Oni no sumu yakata	
1969	Hitokiri	人斬り	Hitokiri	Okada Izō
1969	The Magoichi Saga	尻啖え孫市	Shirikurae Magoichi	Oda Nobunaga
1969		悪名一番勝負	Akumyo ichiban shobu	Asakichi
1970		喧嘩屋一代 どでかい奴	Kenka ichidai: Dodekai yatsu	
1970	Zatoichi Meets Yojimbo	座頭市と用心棒	Zatōichi to Yōjinbō	Ichi
1970		玄海遊侠伝 破れかぶれ	Genkai yūkyōden: Yabure kabure	
1970	Incident at Blood Pass	待ち伏せ	Machibuse	
1970	Yakuza Zessyō	やくざ絶唱	Yakuza zessyō	
1970	Zatoichi at the Fire Festival	座頭市あばれ火祭り	Zatōichi abare-himatsuri	Ichi
1970	Fuji sanchō	富士山頂	Fuji sanchō	
1971	Zatoichi and the One-Armed Swordsman	新座頭市・破れ！唐人剣	Shin Zatōichi: Yabure! Tojin-ken	Ichi
1971	Inn of Evil	いのちぼうにふろう	Inochi bō ni furō	
1971	The Gift of the Fox	狐のくれた赤ん坊	Kitsune no kureta akanbō	
1971	Kaoyaku	顔役	Kaoyaku	
1972	Zatoichi at Large	座頭市御用旅	Zatōichi goyō-tabi	Ichi
1972		新・兵隊やくざ 火線	Shin heitai yakuza: Kasen	
1972	Zatoichi in Desperation	新座頭市物語・折れた杖	Shin Zatōichi monogatari: Oreta tsue aka	Ichi also director
1972	Hanzo the Razor: Sword of Justice	御用牙	Goyōkiba	Hanzo Itami
1973	Mute Samurai	唖侍鬼一法眼	Oshizamurai Kiichihōgan (TV series)	Manji
1973	Zatoichi's Conspiracy	新座頭市物語・笠間の血祭り	Shin Zatōichi monogatari: Kasama no chimatsuri	Ichi
1973		王将	Ōshō	Sankichi Sakata
1973	Hanzo the Razor: The Snare	御用牙 かみそり半蔵地獄責め	Goyōkiba: Kamisori Hanzō jigoku zeme	Hanzo Itami
1974	The Homeless	無宿	Yadonashi	
1974	Hanzo the Razor: Who's Got the Gold?	御用牙 鬼の半蔵やわ肌小判	Goyōkiba: Oni no Hanzō yawahada koban	Hanzo Itami
1974	Akumyo: Notorious Dragon	悪名 縄張荒らし	Akumyo: shima arashiaka	Asakichi
1974	Zatōichi monogatari (TV series)	座頭市物語	Zatōichi monogatari	Ichi
1975	Tsūkai! Kōchiyama Sōshun (TV series)	痛快!河内山宗俊	Tsūkai! Kōchiyama Sōshun	Kōchiyama Sōshun
1983		迷走地図	Meiso chizu	
1983	The Women of Osaka Castle (TV movie)	女たちの大坂城	Onna-tachi no Osaka-jo	Oda Nobunaga
1987	The one-eyed dragon Masamune (TV series)	独眼竜政宗	Dokuganryu Masamune	Toyotomi Hideyoshi
1988	Tokyo: The Last Megalopolis	帝都物語	Teito Monogatari	Shibusawa Eiichi
1989	Zatoichi: Darkness Is His Ally	座頭市	Zatōichi	Ichi, also director
1990	Saga of the Phoenix	孔雀王アシュラ伝説	Kujaku ō: Ashura densetsu	
1990	Ronin Gai	浪人街	Rōnin-gai	

=== As producer ===
Year	Title	Japanese	Romanization	Role
1970	Zatoichi Meets Yojimbo		Zatōichi to Yōjinbō	producer
1970	Zatoichi at the Fire Festival		Zatōichi abare-himatsuri	producer
1971	Zatoichi Meets the One Armed Swordsman		Shin Zatōichi: Yabure! Tojin-ken	producer
1971	Kaoyaku		Kaoyaku	executive producer
1972	Hanzo the Razor: Sword of Justice		Goyōkiba	producer
1972	Zatoichi at Large		Zatōichi goyō-tabi	producer
1972	New Hoodlum Soldier Story: Firing Line		Shin heitai yakuza: Kasen	producer
1972	Lone Wolf and Cub: Sword of Vengeance		Kozure Ōkami: Kowokashi udekashi tsukamatsuru	producer
1972	Lone Wolf and Cub: Baby Cart at the River Styx		Kozure Ōkami: Sanzu no kawa no ubaguruma	producer
1972	Lone Wolf and Cub: Baby Cart to Hades		Kozure Ōkami: Shinikazeni mukau ubaguruma	producer
1972	Zatoichi in Desperation		Shin Zatōichi monogatari: Oreta tsue	producer
1973	Mute Samurai		Oshizamurai Kiichihōgan (TV series)	executive producer
1973	Zatoichi's Conspiracy		Shin Zatōichi monogatari: Kasama no chimatsuri	
1973	Hanzo the Razor: The Snare		Goyōkiba: Kamisori Hanzō jigoku zeme	
1974	The Homeless		Yadonashi	producer
1974	Hanzo the Razor: Who's Got the Gold?		Goyōkiba: Oni no Hanzō yawahada koban	producer
1974	Akumyo: Notorious Dragon		Akumyo: shima arashiaka	
1980	Shogun Assassin			producer
1989	Shintaro Katsu's Zatoichi		Zatōichi	

=== As director ===
Year	Title	Japanese	Romanization
1971	Kaoyaku		Kaoyaku
1972	Zatoichi in Desperation		Shin Zatōichi monogatari: Oreta tsue
1973	Mute Samurai		Oshi samurai (TV series)
1974	Zatoichi		Zatōichi monogatari (TV series) (episode "A Memorial Day and the Bell of Life")
1989	Zatoichi: Darkness Is His Ally		Zatōichi

=== As writer ===
Year	Title	Japanese	Romanization
1970	Zatoichi at the Fire Festival		Zatōichi abare-himatsuri
1971	Kaoyaku		Kaoyaku
1989	Zatoichi: Darkness Is His Ally		Zatōichi

=== As himself ===
Year	Film	Film type
1978	The Blind Swordsman	Documentary

== Bibliography ==
- Katsu, Shintaro (2014) [First published 1992]. 俺 勝新太郎 [I, Katsu Shintaro] (in Japanese) (Revised 2nd printing ed.). Kozando Bunko. ISBN 978-4331654323.
- Shintaro Katsu Illustrated. Pie-Books. 24 June 2005. ISBN 978-4-89444-303-7.
- Desjardins, Chris (22 July 2005). Outlaw Masters of Japanese Film. I.B.Tauris. ISBN 978-1-84511-090-1.
- Dougill, John (2006). Kyoto: A Cultural History. Oxford University Press US. ISBN 978-0-19-530137-3.
- Iwasaki, Mineko; Brown, Rande (October 2002). Geisha: A Life. Simon and Schuster. ISBN 978-0-7434-5304-2.
- Moeran, Brian (August 1996). A Japanese Advertising Agency: An Anthropology of Media and Markets. University of Hawai ̕i Press. ISBN 978-0-8248-1872-2.
- Richie, Donald (1996). Public People, Private People: Portraits of Some Japanese. Kodansha International. ISBN 978-4-7700-2104-5.
- Richie, Donald (2005). The Japan Journals: 1947–2004. Stone Bridge Press, Inc. ISBN 978-1-880656-97-6.
- Whiting, Robert (30 March 1999). Tokyo Underworld: The Fast Times and Hard Life of an American Gangster in Japan. Pantheon Books. ISBN 978-0-679-41976-1.
- Nogami, Teruyo (2006). Waiting on the Weather: Making Movies with Akira Kurosawa. Stone Bridge Press, Inc. ISBN 978-1-933330-09-9.
