= Daiei Film =

Film company

Daiei
- Type: Public
- Industry: Motion pictures
- Founded: 1942; 84 years ago 1974 (Daiei Film, a subsidiary of Tokuma Shoten); 2002 (Kadokawa Daiei Film, a subsidiary of Kadokawa Shoten)
- Founders: Shunsuke Inuma; Masaichi Nagata
- Defunct: 1971 (Original); 2002 (Daiei Film, a subsidiary of Tokuma Shoten); 2011 (Kadokawa Daiei Film, a subsidiary of Kadokawa Shoten)
- Fate: Bankrupt (Original); Acquired by Kadokawa Shoten (Daiei Film, a subsidiary of Tokuma Shoten); Merged with Kadokawa Shoten (Kadokawa Daiei Film, a subsidiary of Kadokawa Shoten)
- Headquarters: Tokyo, Japan
- Area served: Japan

Daiei Film Co. Ltd. (Japanese: 大映映画株式会社, Hepburn: Daiei Eiga Kabushiki Gaisha) was a Japanese film studio. In 1942, it was established as Dai Nippon Film Production (大日本映画製作株式会社, Dai Nippon Eiga Seisaku Kabushiki Gaisha) through corporate consolidation under the government's wartime controls, and in 1945, the company name was changed to simply Daiei Co. Ltd. (大映株式会社, Daiei Kabushiki Gaisha).

== Overview ==
It was one of the major studios during the postwar Golden Age of Japanese cinema, boasting a roster of directors like Kenji Mizoguchi, Kenji Misumi, and Yasuzō Masumura, alongside stars such as Shintaro Katsu, Ichikawa Raizō VIII, Machiko Kyō, Ayako Wakao, Fujiko Yamamoto, and Jirō Tamiya. It produced not only artistic masterpieces, such as Akira Kurosawa's Rashomon (1950), Mizoguchi's Ugetsu (1953) and Sansho the Bailiff (1954), and Teinosuke Kinugasa's Gate of Hell (1953) but also launched several film franchise, such as Gamera, Zatoichi and Yokai Monsters, and made the three Daimajin films (1966).

Amid the rise of television, the entire Japanese cinema underwent significant decline. Daiei failed to build a solid foundation (such as to secure stable systems for productions and distributions) and to diversify, and it went bankrupt in 1971.

In 1974, the company was restructured as the production studio Daiei Film by the publisher Tokuma Shoten, producing critical and commercial hits such as The Silk Road (1988), and Shall We Dance? (1996). However, due to its parent company's financial struggles following the collapse of the bubble economy, Daiei Film was acquired by publisher Kadokawa Shoten in 2002. The business was transferred to the newly established Kadokawa Daiei Studio. The Daiei name disappeared in 2004 as a result of Kadokawa's reorganization of its film operations. Following subsequent mergers, Kadokawa Corporation now manages the former Daiei film library.

== History ==
Daiei Film was the product of governmental efforts to reorganize the film industry during the World War II in order to rationalize use of resources and increase control over the medium. Against a government plan to combine all the film studios into two companies, Masaichi Nagata, an executive at Shinkō Kinema, pressed hard for an alternative plan to create three studios. His efforts won out and Shinkō Kinema, Daito Eiga, and the production arm of Nikkatsu (the Nikkatsu theaters did not take part in the merger) were merged in 1942 to form the Dai Nippon Eiga Seisaku Kabushiki Kaisha, or Daiei for short. The novelist Kan Kikuchi served as the first president, with Nagata continuing as an executive. Daiei's studios were located in Chofu, Tokyo and in Uzumasa in Kyoto.

=== Golden era ===
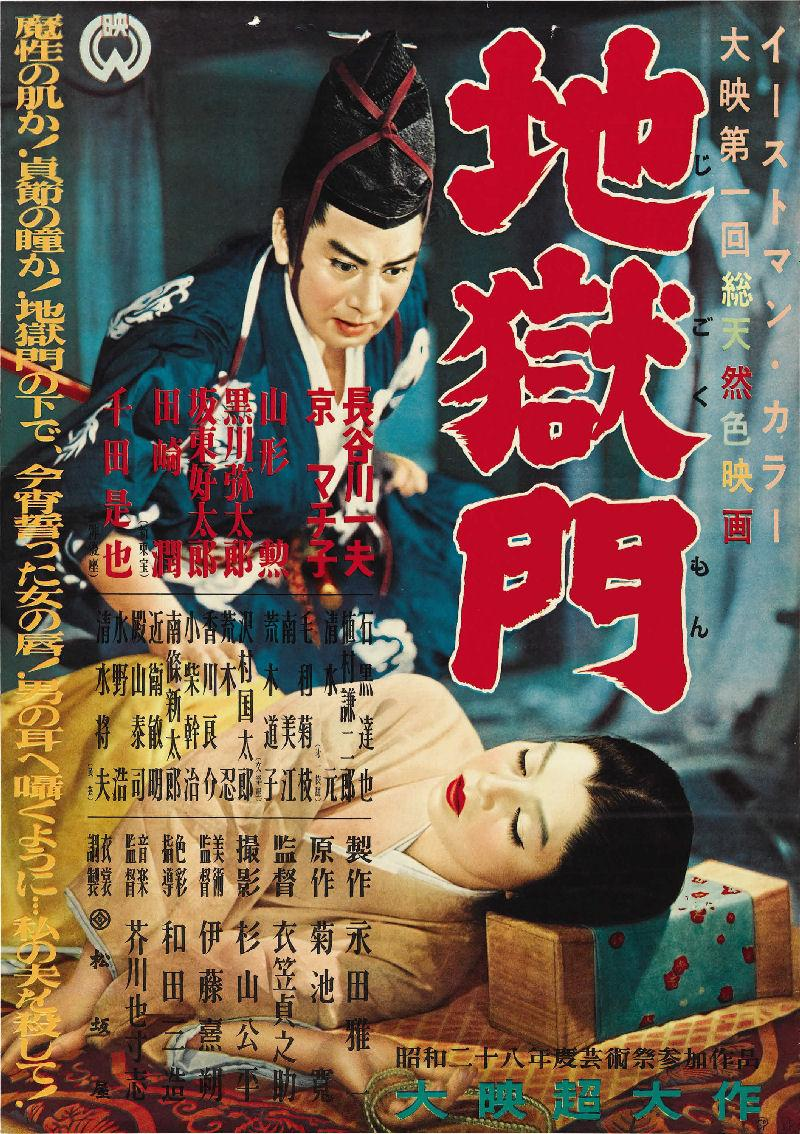
Gate of Hell theatrical release poster

Nagata became president in 1947 and, apart from a brief period when he was purged by Occupation authorities, remained in that position until 1971. Under his reign, Daiei produced Akira Kurosawa's Rashomon (1950) and entered it in the Venice Film Festival, where it won the grand prize and became the first Japanese film to win an international award, thus introducing Japanese cinema to the world. Daiei also produced Teinosuke Kinugasa's Gate of Hell (1953), the first Japanese color film to be shown abroad, earning both an honorary Academy Award for Best Foreign Language Film and the Palme d'Or at the Cannes Film Festival. Daiei also produced such renowned films as Kenji Mizoguchi's Ugetsu (1953) and Sansho the Bailiff (1954), as well as Jokyo ("A Woman's Testament", 1960) which was entered into the 10th Berlin International Film Festival. On the popular front, Daiei was also known for such successful film series as the Zatoichi series starring Shintaro Katsu, the Nemuri Kyoshiro (Sleepy Eyes of Death) series starring Raizō Ichikawa, the original Gamera series, the Daimajin trilogy and the Yokai Monsters trilogy. Daiei also produced many television series such as Shōnen Jet.

At its peak, Daiei featured such talent as the actors Raizō Ichikawa, Shintaro Katsu, Kazuo Hasegawa, Fujiko Yamamoto, Machiko Kyō, and Ayako Wakao; the directors Kenji Mizoguchi, Kon Ichikawa, Yasuzo Masumura, Tokuzō Tanaka, and Kenji Misumi; and the cinematographer Kazuo Miyagawa and Fujirō Morita.

Like some other Japanese film studios, Daiei had its own professional baseball team in the 1950s, the Daiei Stars, which later became the Daiei Unions. These teams eventually became the Chiba Lotte Marines.

=== Decay and bankruptcy ===
Masaichi Nagata's extensive achievements and commitment to the domestic cinema shaped his profligate, obstinate, and autocratic management of Daiei to prioritize production-first philosophy and the inflexible business models, clinging to productions and qualities of films, and Masaichi's son Hidemasa's business acumen was insufficient to refloat Daiei. Amid the industry-wide decline in attendance due to a recession and the arise of television, Nagata's hostility and distrust towards this new, concerning competitor furtherly reduced diversity and potentials of Daiei's business models and sales capabilities. Although Daiei Tv-Film was subsequently established, Daiei fell behind other studios to enter the television industry. Staff shortages also prevented stable film productions, unlike Toho for example.

Additionally, increase of double featuring, affected by the situation surrounding block booking and the competition laws in the United States, was one of key factors that shaped the direction of the Japanese cinema, and the differences in responses to this trend (more double features) determined the courses of respective companies. Shintoho was launched after the Toho strikes, and entries of Shintoho and Nikkatsu into the market increased film supplies to theaters, furtherly promoting the system (double feature). Regarding the situation, Daiei's approach towards the necessity to reduce production costs, especially labor fees, was also inferior to other studios due to its narrower and less flexible business models.

Daiei furtherly suffered from multiple other factors, such as Ichikawa Raizō VIII's death, and the lack of exclusive theater chains (so as the company's dependence on movie theaters by other film studios to distribute Daiei productions). To overcome the situation, Daiei launched the Daiei Industrial Enterprise Co., Ltd. (Japanese: 大映興業株式会社, Hepburn: Daiei Kōgyō Kabushiki Gaisha) to gain directly managing movie theaters, however the attempt failed as feasible properties were already acquired by other companies, further accelerating financial difficulties of Daiei Film. It additionally tried to stay alive by teaming up with Nikkatsu to create Dainichi Eihai, but eventually declared bankruptcy in December 1971. In response to this, enraged employees rioted and destroyed various props and materials especially for Gamera, the franchise which solely prolonged the last years of the company. Aside from suicide victioms such as Taro Marui, Jirō Tamiya, Shirō Ōtsuji, and Tarō Yuge, there had been additional individuals that attempted suicides around this period such as Mari Atsumi and Akira Kurosawa, who contributed in Daiei's growth.

While Daiei was the most heavily damaged major studio, the entire film industry underwent drastic changes in this period; about the half of entire movie theaters in Japan were closed, and Shintoho also went bankrupt. Toho laid off actors and formed a new structure for film productions, and the Godzilla film series faced a hiatus. Kyusaku Hori, the first president of Nikkatsu (which and Daiei once formed the Dainichi Eihai) resigned and the company undertook the policy to focus on the "Roman Porno". Toei Company was also stagnating, and the death of the first president Hiroshi Okawa aggravated the situation.

=== Successors ===
Art director Yoshinobu Nishioka and some of the studio's other employees founded Kyoto Eizo Production. Other members of the union, however, succeeded in getting Yasuyoshi Tokuma, the president of the publishing house Tokuma Shoten, to revive the company in 1974. The company continued as a producer, making only a small number of films, some of which were big budget spectaculars like the international co-production The Go Masters (1982), a new Gamera trilogy (1995 - 1999), new Zatoichi entries and related Razor and Lone Wolf and Cub and since 1972, art house hits like Shall We Dance? (1996), and genre films like Kiyoshi Kurosawa's Pulse or Takashi Miike's Dead or Alive films.

Following the passing of the president Yasuyoshi, Daiei Film Co. was sold to the Kadokawa Shoten Publishing Co. In November 2002, Chairman Tsuguhiko Kadokawa announced that Daiei Film Co. would merge with the company's own film division, Kadokawa Pictures, to form Kadokawa-Daiei Film Co. Ltd. In 2004, it dropped the name Daiei and went by the name Kadokowa Pictures. The studio now goes by the name; Kadokawa Daiei Studio Co., Ltd.

== Filmography ==
- List of Daiei films

== Anime productions ==
- Gaki Deka's OVA (1989)
- La Blue Girl (1989–1992)
- The Dark Myth (1990)
- Dark Warrior (1991)
- Makyu Senjo 2 (1991)
- La Blue Girl EX (1994)
- Hokago no Shokuinshitsu (1994)
- Pom Poko (1994)
- Twin Dolls (1994)
- Venus 5 (1994)
- Lesson XX (1995)
- Twin Angels (1995)
- The Adventures of Kotetsu (1996–1997)
- Pure Love (1998–1999)
- Terra Story (1998)
- Someday's Dreamers (2003)

== See also ==
- Toho
- Shintoho
- Tsuburaya Productions
- Kadokawa Daiei Studio
- Nikkatsu
- Shochiku
- Toei Company
