= Samurai cinema =

Film genre

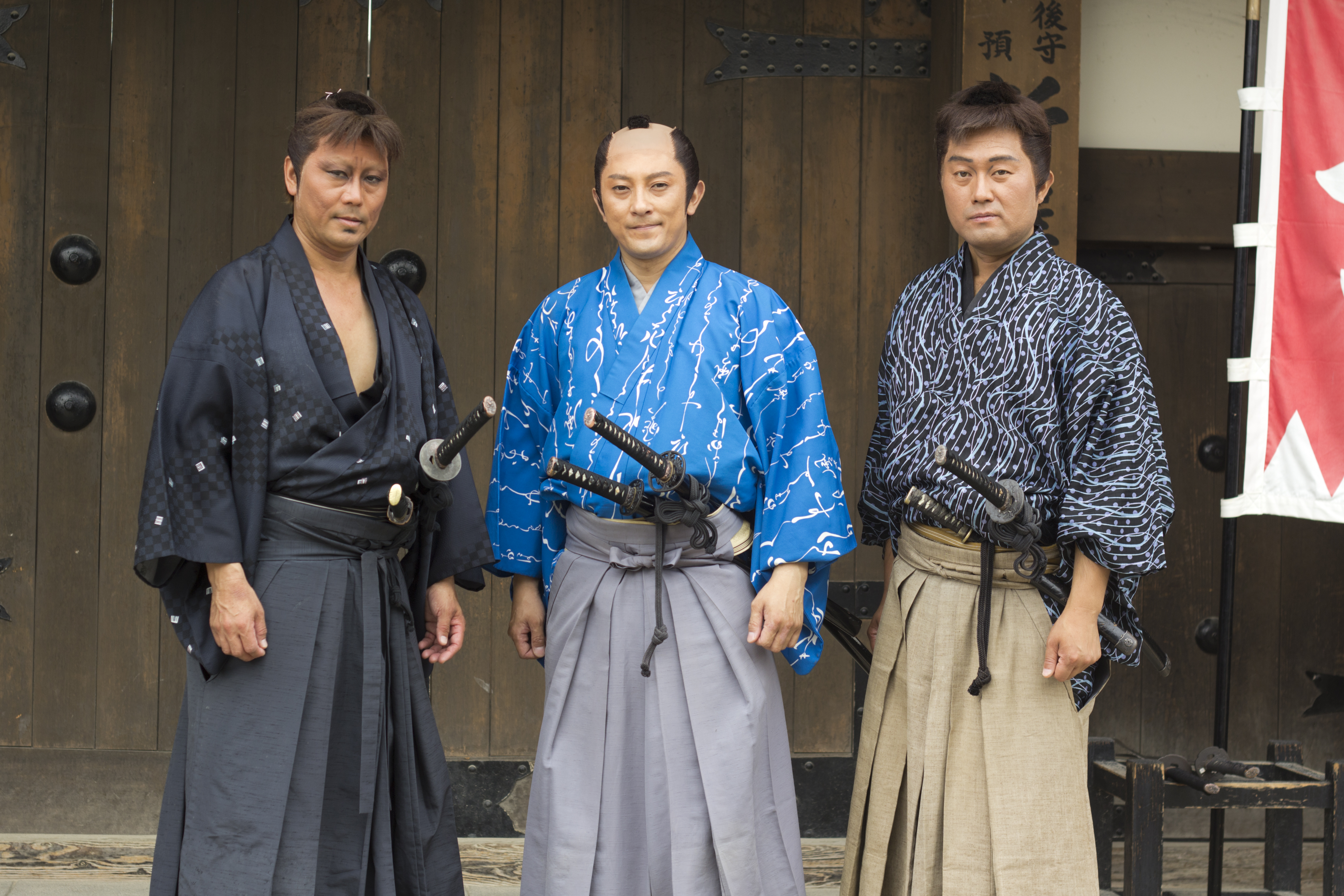
Actors playing samurai and rōnin at Kyoto's Eigamura film studio

Chanbara (チャンバラ; [tɕambaɾa]), also commonly spelled chambara, meaning "sword fighting" films, denotes the Japanese film genre known as samurai cinema in English and is roughly equivalent to Western and swashbuckler films. Chanbara is a sub-category of jidaigeki, which equates to period drama. Jidaigeki may refer to a story set in a historical period, though not necessarily dealing with a samurai character or depicting swordplay.

While earlier samurai period pieces were more dramatic rather than action-based, samurai films produced after World War II have become more action-based, with darker and more violent characters. Post-war samurai epics tended to portray psychologically or physically scarred warriors. Akira Kurosawa stylized and exaggerated death and violence in samurai epics. His samurai, and many others portrayed in film, were solitary figures, more often concerned with concealing their martial abilities, rather than showing them off.

Historically, the genre is usually set during the Tokugawa era (1600–1868). The samurai film hence often focuses on the end of an entire way of life for the samurai: many of the films deal with masterless rōnin, or samurai dealing with changes to their status resulting from a changing society.

Samurai films were constantly made into the early 1970s, but by then, overexposure on television, the aging of the big stars of the genre, and the continued decline of the mainstream Japanese film industry put a halt to most of the production of this genre.

Chanbara also refers to a martial arts sport similar to fencing.

== Samurai film directors ==
Daisuke Itō and Masahiro Makino were central to the development of samurai films in the silent and prewar eras.

Akira Kurosawa is the best known to western audiences, and similarly has directed the samurai films best known in the West. He directed Seven Samurai, Rashomon, Throne of Blood, Yojimbo and many others. Toshirō Mifune, arguably Japan's most famous actor, often starred in Kurosawa's films. Mifune himself had a production company that produced samurai epics, often with him starring. Two of Kurosawa's samurai movies were based on the works of William Shakespeare, Throne of Blood (Macbeth) and Ran (King Lear). A number of his films were remade in Italy and the United States as westerns, or as action films set in other contexts. His film Seven Samurai is one of the most important touchstones of the genre and the most well known outside Japan. It also illustrates some of the conventions of samurai film in that the main characters are rōnin, masterless unemployed samurai, free to act as their conscience dictates. Importantly, these men tend to deal with their problems with their swords and are very skilled at doing so. It also shows the helplessness of the peasantry and the distinction between the two classes.

Masaki Kobayashi directed the films Harakiri and Samurai Rebellion, both cynical films based on flawed loyalty to the clan.

Kihachi Okamoto films focus on violence in a particular fashion. In particular in his films Samurai Assassin, Kill! and Sword of Doom. The latter is particularly violent, the main character engaging in combat for a lengthy 7 minutes of film at the end of the movie. His characters are often estranged from their environments, and their violence is a flawed reaction to this.

Hideo Gosha and many of his films helped create the archetype of the samurai outlaw. Gosha's films are as important as Kurosawa's in terms of their influence, visual style and content, yet are not as well known in the West. Gosha's films often portrayed the struggle between traditional and modernist thought and were decidedly anti-feudal. He largely stopped making chambara, switching to the Yakuza genre, in the 1970s. Some of his most noted movies are Goyokin, Hitokiri, Three Outlaw Samurai and Kedamono no Ken ("Sword of the Beast").

Kenji Misumi was active making samurai films from the 1950s to the mid-1970s. He directed roughly 30 films in the genre, including some the Lone Wolf and Cub films, and a number in the Zatoichi and Sleepy Eyes of Death series.

An excellent example of the kind of immediacy and action evident in the best genre is seen in Gosha's first film, the Three Outlaw Samurai, based on a television series. Three farmers kidnap the daughter of the local magistrate in order to call attention to the starvation of local peasants, a rōnin appears and decides to help them. In the process, two other rōnin with shifting allegiances join the drama, the conflict widens, eventually leading to betrayal, assassination and battles between armies of mercenary rōnin.

Recently another director, Keishi Ōtomo, has directed a live-action adaption of Nobuhiro Watsuki's manga series Rurouni Kenshin, which tells the story of a former Ishin Shishi named Himura Kenshin (formerly known as "Hitokiri Battōsai" (人斬り抜刀斎). After the end of the Bakumatsu, he becomes a rōnin wandering Japan's countryside, offering protection and aid to those in need as atonement for the murders he once committed as an assassin. The film was a huge critical and commercial success. Rurouni Kenshin was theatrically released on August 25, 2012, in Japan, grossing over $36 million in the country and over $60 million worldwide as of November 2012. It was released on home media on December 26, 2012. The film has been licensed for distribution in over 60 countries in Europe, the Americas and Asia. The movie premiered in North America as an opening selection for the 2012 LA EigaFest on December 14, 2012. Two sequels titled Rurouni Kenshin: Kyoto Taika-hen and Rurouni Kenshin: Densetsu no Saigo-hen were released in 2014.

== Popular characters in samurai films ==
=== Zatoichi ===
A blind burly masseur and gambler/yakuza with short hair, he is a skilled swordsman who fights using only his hearing. While less known in the West, he is arguably the most famous chanbara character in Japan.

=== The Crimson Bat ===
Four movies about another blind character, Oichi a.k.a. "the Crimson Bat", a female sword fighter, was made in response to the huge success of Zatoichi.

=== Nemuri Kyōshirō ===
Nemuri Kyoshirō, the master of the Engetsu ("Full Moon Cut") sword style, was a wandering "lone wolf" warrior plagued by the fact that he was fathered in less than honorable circumstance by a "fallen" Portuguese priest who had turned to worshipping Satan and a Japanese noblewoman whom the "fallen" priest had seduced and raped as part of a Black Mass and who had committed suicide after Kyōshirō was born. As a result, Kyōshirō despised both Christianity (which he considered weak and hypocritical) and the shogunal government (which he considered corrupt).

=== Miyamoto Musashi ===
A substantial number of films have been made about Miyamoto Musashi, a famed historical warrior and swordsman, most notably a three-movie series (1954-1956) starring Toshiro Mifune and a six-movie series (1961-1965 and 1971) starring Kinnosuke Nakamura, both based on the novel Musashi by Eiji Yoshikawa.

=== Lone Wolf and Cub ===
Lone Wolf and Cub, the tale of a samurai traveling Japan with his son in a wooden pram (which is armed and on occasion used in combat) was made most notably into a six-film series (1972-1974) starring Tomisaburo Wakayama as Ogami Itto, a live action television series (1973-1976) starring Kinnosuke Yorozuya (formerly Kinnosuke Nakamura) as Ogami Ittō, a 1993 film with Masakazu Tamura as Ogami Ittō and a 2002-2004 television series starring Kin'ya Kitaōji as Ogami Ittō.

=== Sanjuro/Rōnin with no name ===
Sanjuro, played by Toshiro Mifune, is the wandering rōnin character who acts as a yojimbo (bodyguard) in two of Kurosawa's films, Yojimbo and Sanjuro. In both films, 三十郎 Sanjuro (a proper given name but which can also be interpreted as meaning "thirty-years-old") makes up a different surname (桑畑 Kuwabatake which means "mulberry field", and 椿 Tsubaki which means "camellia"), thus leading some to label the character as a "rōnin with no name", in reference to the Man with No Name character who was directly inspired by Yojimbo and portrayed by Clint Eastwood in Sergio Leone's "Dollars Trilogy" of Spaghetti Western films.

Mifune later played analogous roles in two films released in 1970, the Zatoichi film Zatoichi Meets Yojimbo (as 佐々大作 Sasa Daisaku), and Incident at Blood Pass (as 鎬刀三郎 Shinogi Tōzaburō = "ridges on a sword" Tozaburo), the two 1972-1974 TV series Ronin of the Wilderness and Yojimbo of the Wilderness (as 峠九十郎 Tōge Kujūrō = "Mountain pass" Kujuro), the 1975 TV series The Sword, the Wind, and the Lullaby (as 砦十三郎 Toride Jūzaburō = "Fortress" Juzaburo), the 1976 TV series Ronin in a Lawless Town (as ミスターの旦那 Misutā no Danna = "Mister customer"), the 1981 TV movie series The Lowly Ronin (as 春夏秋冬 Shunka Shūtō = "Spring-Summer Autumn-Winter"), and the 1983 TV movie The Secret of Cruel Valley (as 素浪人 Surōnin = "Lowly rōnin").

=== The Bored Hatamoto ===
"Bored Hatamoto" Saotome Mondonosuke (also known in English as "The Idle Vassal" and "The Crescent-Scarred Samurai") was a hatamoto or direct vassal of Shogun Tsunayoshi, whose 'crescent-scar' on his forehead signifies his right to kill in the name of the shogun and rid Japan of corruption and evil. Saotome craves action to fight the boredom he feels when not pitting his sword skill against those who would corrupt Japan. The character was famously played by Utaemon Ichikawa on film 30 times from 1930 to 1963 and in a 25 episode TV series from 1973 to 1974, by Takeo Nakamura in a TV series from 1959 to 1960, by Hideki Takahashi in a TV series from 1970 to 1971, by Mikijiro Hira in a 1983 TV movie, and by Kin'ya Kitaōji (Ichikawa's son, who also appeared with his father in some of the films) in 9 made-for-TV movies from 1988 to 1994 and in a 10 episode TV series in 2001.

=== Tange Sazen ===
Tange Samanosuke, a Sōma clan samurai, is attacked and mutilated as a result of betrayal, losing his right eye and right arm, and becomes a nihilistic rōnin, using the pseudonym "Sazen". He has been played in numerous films by Denjirō Ōkōchi, Tsumasaburō Bandō, Ryūtarō Ōtomo, Ryūnosuke Tsukigata, Kinnosuke Nakamura, and Tetsurō Tanba

=== Himura Kenshin ===
Himura Kenshin is the protagonist of the Rurouni Kenshin manga series created by Nobuhiro Watsuki. Kenshin is a former legendary assassin known as "Hitokiri Battōsai" (Note: "Hitokiri". The term refers to an assassin and translates as "man-slayer". Within the Rurouni Kenshin universe "Battōsai" refers to someone who has mastered battōjutsu. Assassins during the bakumatsu adopted professional names; for instance Kawakami Gensai was known as Hitokiri Gensai.). Kenshin wanders the countryside of Japan offering protection and aid to those in need, as atonement for the murders he once committed as an assassin. In Tokyo, he meets a young woman named Kamiya Kaoru, who invites him to live in her dojo despite learning about Kenshin's past. Throughout the series, Kenshin begins to establish lifelong relationships with many people, including ex-enemies, while dealing with his fair share of enemies, new and old. The character is portrayed by actor Takeru Satoh in five live-action films adapting the story, such as Rurouni Kenshin, Rurouni Kenshin: Kyoto Taika-hen and Rurouni Kenshin: Densetsu no Saigo-hen directed by Keishi Ōtomo.

== Themes ==
A samurai film must include samurai warriors, sword fighting and historical setting. Samurai warriors, in film, are differentiated from other warriors by the code of honor, followed to honor the samurai's leader. A samurai must be skilled in warfare and martial arts and ready to defend his honor, even to his death. If not able to defend his honor, a samurai may choose to commit self-disembowelment (seppuku), in order to save reputation or "face". Instead, a samurai may exact vengeance in a case of the loss of someone the samurai cared about, such as occurs in the film Harakiri. In it, Hanshiro Tsugumo takes revenge on the house of Kageyu Saito for the loss of his adopted son-in-law, who was forced to commit suicide by the house of Kageyu Saito. The house of Kageyu Saito refused to give the son-in-law money. Because he had asked to commit suicide he was forced to perform self-disembowelment, with a remarkable twist not revealed in this discussion. Hanshiro knows an example was unrightfully made of his son-in-law in order to discourage the asking by impoverished samurai for donations from the house of Kageyu. In film, motivation may vary but the samurai's behavior is to maintain honor even in death and is perpetuated by the code of bushido.

Also, looking at the historical setting of the film the audience can take cultural context of the samurai in that certain period. For instance, the Sengoku period (1478–1603) saw Japan torn by civil war as daimyō warlords fought for control of land. In the Tokugawa period (1603–1868), peace from civil war meant there were no wars for the samurai to fight and some samurai became rōnin, masterless warriors left to struggle to survive. In the Meiji period (1868–1912), we see a decline of the hereditary existence of the samurai and the rise of westernization. In this period the ideal of the samurai and the code of bushido are popularized into the military warrior's belief. The time frame meant changes in the sorts of conflicts for the samurai to fight and film would capture their resistance against overwhelming odds.

A recurring conflict the ideal samurai encounters is the ninjō and giri conflict. Ninjō is the human feeling that tells you what is right and giri is the obligation of the samurai to his lord and clan. The conflict originated from overwhelming control of the Tokugawa bakufu government over the samurai's behavior. Often samurai would question the morality of their actions and are torn between duty and conscience. This conflict transcends eras in samurai films and can create the perception of the protagonist as being the moral underdog or steadfast warrior. In The Last Samurai, Katsumoto is no longer of use to his emperor and sentenced to self-disembowelment. He goes against his duty to follow through with his sentence and flees to fight his final rebellion against the central government's army. Ninjo and giri conflict is dynamic to the character of the samurai.

The samurai warrior is often synonymous with their sword. Although swordsmanship is an important aspect of warfare, idealizing the samurai and the sword as having a bond is an invented ideal, although it is popularized in many dramas. The Tokugawa period saw a change in the type of warfare, as combat shifted from the bow and arrow to close range combat with handheld weapons, and competitive sword competition.

There are a number of themes that occur in samurai film plots. Many feature roaming masterless samurai, seeking work or a place in society. Others are period historical tales of true characters. Others show tales of clan loyalty.

== International influence ==
=== Western cinema ===
Initially early samurai films were influenced by the still growing Western film genre before and during World War II. Since then both genres have had a healthy impact on one another. Two forefathers of the genre, Akira Kurosawa and Masaki Kobayashi, were influenced by American film directors such as John Ford.

A number of western movies have re-told the samurai movie in a Western context, particularly spaghetti Westerns. Italian director Sergio Leone's A Fistful of Dollars and Walter Hill's Last Man Standing are both remakes of Yojimbo. Clint Eastwood's Man with No Name character was modeled to some degree on Mifune's wandering rōnin character that appeared in so many of his films. The Hidden Fortress influenced George Lucas when he made Star Wars. Seven Samurai has been remade as a Western and a science fiction context film, The Magnificent Seven and Battle Beyond the Stars. Other samurai influenced western movies include Charles Bronson and Toshirō Mifune in Red Sun (1971), David Mamet's Ronin (with Jean Reno and Robert De Niro), Six-String Samurai (1998) and Ghost Dog: The Way of the Samurai (1999).

Seven Samurai was highly influential, often seen as one of the most "remade, reworked, referenced" films in cinema. It made the "assembling the team" trope popular in movies and other media; this has since become a common trope in many action movies and heist films. The visuals, plot and dialogue of Seven Samurai have inspired a wide range of filmmakers, ranging from George Lucas to Quentin Tarantino. Elements from Seven Samurai have been borrowed by many films, with examples including plot elements in films such as Three Amigos (1986) by John Landis, visual elements in large-scale battle scenes of films such as The Lord of the Rings: The Two Towers (2002) and The Matrix Revolutions (2003), and borrowed scenes in George Miller's Mad Max: Fury Road (2015).

The Zatoichi character was re-made as Blind Fury in the United States, starring Rutger Hauer as a blind swordsman living in the modern US. Most recently, The Last Samurai (2003), the story being loosely based on the true historical French officer Jules Brunet assisting Japanese samurai in rebellion against the Emperor.

=== Hong Kong action cinema ===
Early wu xia weapon martial arts films from Hong Kong action cinema were inspired by Japanese samurai films from the 1940s onwards. By the early 1970s, these wu xia films had evolved into hand-to-hand kung fu films, popularized by Bruce Lee. In turn, kung fu films from Hong Kong became popular and influential in Japan from the 1970s onwards.

== List of notable films ==
Title	Director	Release date	Comments
Orochi	Buntaro Futagawa	1925.11.20	
Humanity and Paper Balloons	Sadao Yamanaka	1937.08.25	
The 47 Ronin	Kenji Mizoguchi	1941.12.01; 1941.12.11	
Jakoman and Tetsu	Senkichi Taniguchi	1949.07.11	
Rashomon	Akira Kurosawa	1950.08.25	
Conclusion of Kojiro Sasaki: Duel at Ganryu Island	Hiroshi Inagaki	1951.10.26	This was the first time that Toshirō Mifune played Musashi Miyamoto.
Vendetta for a Samurai	Kazuo Mori	1952.01.03	
Gate of Hell	Teinosuke Kinugasa	1953.10.31	
Seven Samurai	Akira Kurosawa	1954.04.26	
Samurai Trilogy: Musashi Miyamoto; Duel at Ichijoji Temple; Duel at Ganryu Island	Hiroshi Inagaki	1954.09.26; 1955.07.12; 1956.01.01	The first film won a Special/Honorary Award at the 1955 Academy Awards for outstanding foreign language film.
Throne of Blood	Akira Kurosawa	1957.01.15	A Japanese version of Macbeth.
The Hidden Fortress	Akira Kurosawa	1958.12.28	A key-inspiration for Star Wars
Samurai Saga	Hiroshi Inagaki	1959.04.28	A Japanese version of Cyrano de Bergerac.
The Gambling Samurai	Senkichi Taniguchi	1960.03.29	
Castle of Flames	Tai Kato	1960.10.30	A Japanese version of Hamlet.
Sanjuro: Yojimbo; Sanjuro	Akira Kurosawa	1961.04.25; 1962.01.01	A Fistful of Dollars was based on the first film.
The Tale of Zatoichi	Kenji Misui	1962.04.12	Debut of the character Zatoichi, who would go on to appear in 28 more films.
Harakiri	Masaki Kobayashi	1962.09.16	Won a prize at the Cannes Film Festival.
Chushingura	Hiroshi Inagaki	1962.11.03	
Three Outlaw Samurai	Hideo Gosha	1964.05.13	
Samurai Assassin	Kihachi Okamoto	1965.01.03	
Sword of the Beast	Hideo Gosha	1965.09.18	
The Sword of Doom	Kihachi Okamoto	1966.02.25	
Samurai Rebellion	Masaki Kobayashi	1967.05.27	This won the Fipresci Prize at the Venice Film Festival.
The Saga of Tanegashima	Kazuo Mori	1968.05.18	
Kill!	Kihachi Okamoto	1968.06.22	
Samurai Banners	Hiroshi Inagaki	1969.03.01	
Red Lion	Kihachi Okamoto	1969.10.10	
Shinsengumi	Tadashi Sawashima	1969.12.05	
Goyokin	Hideo Gosha	1969.05.01	
Hitokiri (Tenchu)	Hideo Gosha	1969.08.09	
Mission: Iron Castle	Kazuo Mori	1970.02.07	
The Ambitious	Daisuke Itō	1970.02.14	
Incident at Blood Pass	Hiroshi Inagaki	1970.03.21	
Shogun's Samurai	Kinji Fukasaku	1978.01.21	
The Fall of Ako Castle	Kinji Fukasaku	1978.10.28	
Kagemusha	Akira Kurosawa	1980.04.26	Nominated for a best foreign film Oscar.
The Bushido Blade	Tsugunobu Kotani	1981	
Legend of the Eight Samurai	Kinji Fukasaku	1983.12.10	
Ran	Akira Kurosawa	1985.06.01	A Japanese version of King Lear. Won Oscar for Best Costume Design; won 25 other awards and 15 nominations.
Zatoichi: Darkness Is His Ally	Shintaro Katsu	1989.02.04	Directed, written and starring Shintaro Katsu.
Zipang	Kaizo Hayashi	1990.01.27	Exuberant post-modern homage to the genre.
Heaven and Earth	Haruki Kadokawa	1991.02.08	
Journey of Honor	Gordon Hessler	1991.04.27	Produced, written and starring Sho Kosugi. Final samurai role for Toshiro Mifune.
Ninja Scroll	Yoshiaki Kawajiri	1993.06.05	Animated film
47 Ronin	Kon Ichikawa	1994.10.22	
After the Rain	Takashi Koizumi	1999.09.05	Written by Akira Kurosawa. Received a Japanese Academy Award in 1999
The Twilight Samurai	Yōji Yamada	2002.11.02	Nominated for a best foreign film Oscar.
When the Last Sword Is Drawn	Yōjirō Takita	2003.01.18	
Zatoichi	Beat Takeshi	2003.09.02	Directed by and starring Beat Takeshi, this film was the Silver Lion award winner at the Venice Film Festival.
The Hidden Blade	Yōji Yamada	2004.10.30	
Love and Honor	Yōji Yamada	2006.12.01	
Castle Under Fiery Skies	Mitsutoshi Tanaka	2009.09.12	
13 Assassins	Takashi Miike	2010.09.25	
Sword of Desperation	Hideyuki Hirayama	2010.07.10	
Ichimei	Takashi Miike	2011.10.15	
Rurouni Kenshin: Rurouni Kenshin; Kyoto Inferno; The Legend Ends	Keishi Ōtomo	2012.08.25; 2014.08.01; 2014.09.13	
Samurai's Promise	Daisaku Kimura	2018.09.28	
Kubi	Takeshi Kitano	2023.05.23	

== Actors ==
- Chiyonosuke Azuma
- Tsumasaburo Bando
- Sonny Chiba
- Raizo Ichikawa
- Utaemon Ichikawa
- Shintaro Katsu
- Hiroki Matsukata
- Toshirō Mifune
- Tatsuya Nakadai
- Kinnosuke Nakamura
- Denjiro Okochi
- Ryutaro Otomo
- Hiroyuki Sanada
- Tetsuro Tamba
- Masakazu Tamura
- Ryunosuke Tsukigata
- Tomisaburō Wakayama
- Ken Watanabe

== Directors ==
- Kinji Fukasaku
- Hideo Gosha
- Kon Ichikawa
- Kazuo Ikehiro
- Hiroshi Inagaki
- Daisuke Ito
- Takeshi Kitano
- Masaki Kobayashi
- Akira Kurosawa
- Kenji Misumi
- Kazuo Mori
- Sadao Nakajima
- Kihachi Okamoto
- Kaneto Shindo
- Masahiro Shinoda
- Tokuzō Tanaka
- Yoji Yamada
- Sadao Yamanaka
- Kimiyoshi Yasuda
