= Kan Shimozawa =

Japanese writer (1892–1968)

- 子母澤 寛
- Born: Umetani Matsutaro; February 1, 1892; Atsuta, Hokkaido
- Died: July 19, 1968 (aged 76); Tokyo
- Education: Meiji University
- Occupation: Novelist
- Writing career
- Notable work: Zatoichi series
- Notable awards: 1962 Kikuchi Kan Prize

Kan Shimozawa (子母澤 寛, Shimozawa Kan; sometimes spelled Shimosawa; February 1, 1892 – July 19, 1968) was a Japanese novelist and historical writer best known for originating the character Zatoichi. He was awarded the Kikuchi Kan Prize in 1962 for a series of works set at the end of the Tokugawa period and the Meiji era.

== Biography ==
Kan Shimozawa was born Umetani Matsutaro in Atsuta, Hokkaido on February 1, 1892. He was the half-brother of painter Migishi Kōtarō.

He graduated from the law school of Meiji University in 1914 and initially returned to his hometown where he worked for a lumber company. He moved back to Tokyo in 1918 to work for an electric company, and in 1919 joined the newspaper Yomiuri Shimbun as a reporter. He would move to the newspaper Tokyo Nichi Nichi Shimbun in 1926.

While working as a reporter, he collected interviews with former Shinsengumi under the guidance of jurist Takeshi Osatake. These interviews served as the basis for the novel Shinsengumi Shimetsuki published in 1928 and adapted into a film in 1962. He would write two sequels, Shinsengumi Ibun (1929) and Shinsengumi Monogatari (1931), later collected together as the Shinsengumi Trilogy.

His most famous character, the blind swordsman Zatoichi, first appeared in the 1948 essay "Zatoichi Monogatari" (座頭市物語), part of Shimozawa's "Futokoro Techō" serials in the magazine Shōsetsu to Yomimono. Originally a minor character, Zatoichi was dramatically altered by Daiei Film and actor Shintaro Katsu for the 1962 film The Tale of Zatoichi and further developed in 25 sequels to become one of Japan's longest-running film series.

Shimozawa died of a heart attack on July 19, 1968 in Tokyo.

== Works ==
He is the creator of several fictional works, including:

- Shinsengumi Shimetsuki (1928), adapted into film in 1962
- Shinsengumi Ibun (1929)
- Shinsengumi Monogatari (1931)
- Yataragasa Shunyodo (1932), basis of TV series Tabito Izaburo
- Kaito Yakuza (1933)
- Katsu Kaishu (1946)
- "Zatoichi Monogatari" (1948), basis of the Zatoichi TV series and films
- Oyakodaka (1955-1956), adapted into a film in 1956 and TV dramas in 1961, 1964, 1972, and 1994
- Otokodaka (1960-1961)

== Historical figures ==
He has written several historical figures into his works, including:

- Takeda Kanryūsai
- Yamazaki Susumu
