= Nemuri Kyōshirō (TV series) =

- Also known as: 眠狂四郎
- Genre: Jidaigeki
- Directed by: Kazuo Ikehiro; Akira Inoue; Tokuzō Tanaka
- Starring: Masakazu Tamura
- Narrated by: Masaya Takahashi
- Theme music composer: Takeo Watanabe
- Country of origin: Japan
- Original language: Japanese
- No. of episodes: 26

Production
- Running time: 45 minutes (per episode)
- Production company: Toei Company

Original release
- Network: Kansai Telecasting Corporation
- Release: 3 October 1972 – 27 March 1973

Nemuri Kyōshirō (眠狂四郎) is a Japanese television jidaigeki or period drama that was broadcast in prime-time in 1972 to 1973. It is based on series of Nemuri Kyōshirō novels by Renzaburō Shibata. Masakazu Tamura played the role of Nemuri Kyōshirō. Tamura's older brother Takahiro Tamura and younger brother Ryo Tamura appeared as a guest in the episode 6. Five special editions of the drama were produced later also Tamura played the role on the stage in 1973 and 1981. The complete DVD box was released on April 10, 2019. The original soundtrack was released on August 11, 2021.

== Plot ==
Set in the eighteenth century, during the reign of the eleventh Tokugawa shōgun Tokugawa Ienari. Nemuri Kyōshirō is a master of the sword, but he is a man who shuts his mind and heart because of his unhappy background: Kyōshirō's father was a Dutch missionary who became an apostate and his mother was the daughter of Matsudaira Mondonoshoū, the Tokugawa shogunate's upper superintendent officer. He was an unwanted child conceived during a Black Mass ceremony, and Kyōshirō's mother killed herself soon after Kyōshirō's birth. Although he hates being involved with incidents and people, he is always involved in them no matter where he goes. Some people challenge him to a duel to see his unusual Engetsu Sappō (Full Moon cut) sword style, while others try to use him because he is a half-breed. He solves incidents with both his intelligence and his Musō Masamune sword.

== Cast ==
- Masakazu Tamura as Nemuri Kyōshirō
- Yoko Yamamoto as Mihoyo episode 1,2,22,26
- Shingo Yamashiro as Kinpachi episode 1.21,25
- Yumiko Nogawa as Mojiwaka episode 1,21
- Shinsuke Ashida as Matsudaira Mondonoshō (Nemuri Kyōshirō `s grand father) episode 26
- Renzaburō Shibata (appeared as an actor in episode 14,17,26)

== Episode list ==
Episode	Title	Directed by	Guest starrings	Original airdate	Notes
1	"Youyake ni Hadaga Chiru" (夕焼けに肌が散る, My Skin Glows in the Sunset)	Akira Inoue	Kōji Nanbara, Fumio Watanabe	October 3, 1972	
2	"Nyoen ni Kengatsuita" (女怨に剣が哭いた, The Sword that Cried for the Vengeance of Women)	Tokuzō Tanaka	Reiko Ohara, Yoshi Katō, Jūkei Fujioka	October 10, 1972	
3	"Katanawa Shigureni Nureta" (刃は時雨に濡れた, The Sword Soaked in Drizzle)	Kimiyoshi Yasuda	Kikko Matsuoka, Tatsuo Endō	October 17, 1972	
4	"Engetsu Junaiwo Keru" (円月 殉愛を斬る, Crescent Moon Cuts Pure Love)	Tokuzō Tanaka	Mariko Kaga, Gorō Mutsumi, Kantarō Suga, Shinjirō Ehara	October 24, 1972	
5	"Adabana ni Tsuyuga Kirameku" (仇花に露が煌めく, The Dew That Shines on the Enemy Flower)	Juniji Kurata	Miyoko Akaza, Goro Ibuki, Hideyo Amamoto, Kei Taguchi	October 31, 1972	
6	"Yoin ni Onnawosaku" (夜陰に女を裂く, Ripping Apart a Woman in the Darkness of the Night)	Akira Inoue	Takahiro Tamura, Ryo Tamura	November 7, 1972	
7	"Tougemichi ni Akaimiwo Utsu" (峠路に赤い実を撃つ, Shooting at the Red Berries at the Crossroads)	Junji Kurata	Kyoko Yoshizawa, Hideo Murota, Rokkō Toura	November 14, 1972	
8	"Seibo wa Honouni Kieta" (聖母は炎に消えた, The Virgin Mary Disappears in Flames)	Kazuo Ikehiro	Tōru Minegishi, Kaku Takashina, Taketoshi Naito	November 21, 1972	
9	"Ijin no Kenga Hoeru" (異人の剣が吠える, The Sword of the Stranger Roars)	Kimiyoshi Yasuda	Miwa Takada, Isamu Nagato	November 28, 1972	
10	"Kōya ni Jorobanaga Saku" (荒野に女郎花が咲く, The Woman Who Cries in the Desert)	Akira Inoue	Masayo Utsunomiya, Kei Satō	December 5, 1972	
11	"Rajo ni Kamiwomita" (裸女に神を見た, I Saw God in a Naked Woman)	Kazuo Ikehiro	Masumi Okada	December 12, 1972	
12	"Senketsu wa Aiwosometa" (鮮血は愛を染めた, Love Stained by Fresh Blood)	Akira Inoue	Kohji Moritsugu	December 19, 1972	
13	"Kyo no Ame Beni no Hadani Musebu" (京の雨 紅の肌に咽ぶ, Rain in Kyoto Drowns in Red Skin)	Tokuzō Tanaka	Kayo Matsuo, Nobuo Kawai	December 26, 1972	
14	"Engetsu Shoshunni Mau" (円月 初春に舞う, Crescent Moon Dances in Early Spring)	Tokuzō Tanaka	Mari Shiraki, Saburo Date, Takuzo Kawatani	January 2, 1973	Guest appearance by the author Renzaburō Shibata
15	"Sandogasa no On'na Wa Moeta" (三度笠の女は燃えた, The Woman with the Straw Hat Burns)	Junji Kurata	Reiko Oshida, Takeo Chii, Shinsuke Mikimoto	January 9, 1973	
16	"Oshare kyōjo ga utau" (お洒落狂女が歌う, The Stylish Madwoman's Song)	Junji Kurata	Ryūtarō Ōtomo, Jun Tazaki	January 16, 1973	
17	"Okappiki Dobu ga Kita" (岡っ引どぶが来た, Dobu the Hireling Thief Has Arrived)	Akira Inoue	Tsutomu Yamazaki, Takeshi Kusaka	January 23, 1973	Crossover with Okappiki Dobu which aired the previous year. Guest appearance by Renzaburō Shibata who authored both novel series.
18	"Kanashimi wa Yamini Kieta" (悲しみは闇に消えた, Sorrow Vanished Into Darkness)	Akira Inoue	Tamao Nakamura, Hideko Yoshida	January 30, 1973	
19	"Mashō no Onna ni Otokoga Tsuku" (魔性の女に男が哭く, A Man Cries for a Demonic Woman)	Tokuzō Tanaka	Mako Midori, Kō Nishimura	February 6, 1973	
20	"Akai Kuchibiru ni Kyōshirō wa Shinda" (紅い唇に狂四郎は死んだ, Kyōshirō Dies under Crimson Lips)	Tokuzō Tanaka	Sadako Sawamura	February 13, 1973	
21	"Onna no Tsubomi wa Nido Hiraku" (女の蕾は二度ひらく, A Woman's Bud Opens Twice)	Junji Kurata	Tappie Shimokawa	February 20, 1973	
22	"Amadera ni Enjiga Niou" (尼寺に臙脂が匂う, Crimson Glow in the Convent)	Junji Kurata	Mari Nakayama, Yoshi Katō	February 27, 1973	
23	"Nazo no Onnawa Yamiwo Uranda" (謎の女は闇を恨んだ, The Mysterious Woman Hated the Darkness)	Yuji Makiguchi	Fumio Watanabe, Junkichi Orimoto	March 6, 1973	
24	"Kinjirareta Hadani Naku" (禁じられた肌に泣く, Crying on Forbidden Skin)	Akira Inoue	Jun Fujimaki, Kei Satō	March 13, 1973	
25	"Kurokamiga Koroshiwo Yonda" (黒髪が殺しを呼んだ, The Black Hair Called Death)	Toshimi Yoda	Goro Ibuki, Yoshi Katō	March 20, 1973	
26	"Kyōshirō ni Asuwanai" (狂四郎に明日はない, Kyoshiro Has No Tomorrow)	Akira Inoue	Shinsuke Ashida, Rinichi Yamamoto	March 27, 1973	Guest appearance by the author Renzaburō Shibata

== TV Specials ==
=== Nemuri Kyoshirō (1989) ===
Kyoshirō becomes involved in a political power struggle when he uncovers a plot to subvert the Shogunate succession by replacing the Shogun's heir with a double.

- Masakazu Tamura as Nemuri Kyōshirō
- Yumi Takigawa
- Shingo Yanagisawa as Kinpachi
- Saburō Shinoda as Asu Shinken
- Junkichi Orimoto
- So Yamamura

Directed by Tokuzō Tanaka

=== Nemuri Kyōshirō: Conspiracy at Edo Castle (1993) ===
Kyoshirō, who has returned to Edo after three years, protects Lady Mihoyo, who exactly resembles his late mother, as rival Elders struggle to destroy each other over the proposed marriage of the Shogun's heir.

- Masakazu Tamura as Nemuri Kyōshirō
- Keiko Takeshita
- Kimiko Ikegami
- Hirotarō Honda as Mibu Shushō
- Masahiko Tsugawa as Matsudaira Mondonoshou (Nemuri Kyōshirō's grand father)

Directed by Akira Inoue

=== Nemuri Kyoshirō: The Man with No Tomorrow (1996) ===
Kyoshirō is asked to help save the Akita Clan from a plot which could end in the clan's extermination.

- Masakazu Tamura as Nemuri Kyōshirō
- Shin Takuma
- Yoko Minamino
- Shigeru Kōyama
- Akira Nakao
- Masahiko Tsugawa as Matsudaira Mondonoshou

Directed by Sadao Nakajima

=== Nemuri Kyoshirō: The Woman Who Loved Kyoshirō (1998) ===
Kyoshirō's Full Moon Cut technique becomes the focus for both an artist who wants Kyoshirō to use that style to kill his wife and a lord who is obsessed with Kyoshirō.

- Masakazu Tamura as Nemuri Kyōshirō
- Hitomi Kuroki as Orin
- Hiroshi Abe as Sakaki Ryūnosuke
- Kimiko Ikegami
- Ken Nishida
- Masahiko Tsugawa as Matsudaira Mondonoshou

Directed by Akira Inoue

=== Nemuri Kyoshirō: The Final (2018) ===
Kyoshirō has returned to Edo after an absence of ten years, only to learn of the murder of his former teacher Priest Kunen. While Kyoshirō tries to hold himself aloof, one day a young girl named Misao suddenly appears to him claiming that he is her father. Kyoshirō doubts that Misao is really his daughter, but that is the least of the plots he must unravel, leading to a face-to-face confrontation with perhaps the most dangerous opponent he has ever faced ... a man who intends to utterly destroy the world Kyoshirō knows in order to create his ideal of Utopia and who also knows and can use the Full-Moon Cut sword style as well as Kyoshirō does!

- Masakazu Tamura as Nemuri Kyōshirō
- Riho Yoshioka as Misao
- Masahiko Tsugawa as Matsudaira Mondonoshou
- Norito Yashima as Kinpachi
- Kippei Shiina as Kagami Yōzō
- Masami Horiuchi as Mizuno Echizen-no-kami
- Takeo Nakahara as Kunen
- Ryuji Harada as a Ronin

Directed by Tomohiko Yamashita

== On the Stage ==
- Nemuri Kyōshirō Buraihikae 1973
- Nemuri Kyōshirō 1973
- Nemuri Kyōshirō Curuz no Hahano Komoriuta 1981
