= God's Puzzle (film) =

2008 film by Takashi Miike

- Kamisama no pazuru
- Directed by: Takashi Miike
- Screenplay by: Masa Nakamura
- Based on: God's Puzzle by Shinji Kimoto
- Produced by: Haruki Kadokawa
- Cinematography: Katsumi Yanagijima
- Edited by: Yasushi Shimamura
- Music by: Hikaru Ishikawa; Yuji Toriyama
- Production companies: Avex Entertainment; Kadokawa Haruki Jimusho; GOD'S PUZZLE Production Committee
- Distributed by: Toei Company
- Release date: June 7, 2008
- Running time: 134 minutes
- Country: Japan
- Language: Japanese

God's Puzzle (神様のパズル, Kamisama no pazuru) is a Japanese science fiction film directed by Takashi Miike. The screenplay by Masa Nakamura is based on the novel God's Puzzle by Shinji Kimoto.

== Plot ==
17-year-old Saraka Homizu invents an infinity-shaped particle accelerator named Mugen. Meanwhile, sushi bar worker and aspiring guitarist Motokazu Watanuki takes his more confident twin brother Yoshikazu's place and attends his difficult physics classes while Yoshikazu is visiting the Phi Phi Islands in Thailand. Motozaku agrees as a means to be near his crush Shiratori, who is dating Airi, a grad student assisting with the seminar.

Believing that Motokazu is the smooth-talking Yoshikazu, Professor Hatomura asks him to convince Saraka Homizu to attend her lab course to complete her degree. Motozaku chooses the creation of the universe as the subject of his final project and Saraka joins him, telling Airi that it is possible for humans to create a universe. She plans to attempt it using Mugen.

When the sushi bar burns down, Motozaku takes a part-time job planting rice in a field underneath Mugen with Hashizume, an elderly student auditing the course. Yoshikazu continues traveling to Delhi, where his passport is stolen. Motokazu learns that Saraka dated Airi before Shiratori, making them rivals.

When the Mugen accelerator does not perform as expected, Saraka is made a scapegoat and public opinion turns against her. A nude video of her is posted on the Internet and Saraka takes advantage of this to spread a virus to computers throughout the world, allowing her to utilize them for more memory. Created through artificial insemination, Saraka cannot find meaning in her life and decides that if there is a god then it will stop her from creating a universe within our own and causing the collapse of our own.

During a powerful typhoon over Tokyo, Saraka reverses the rotation of one of the rings of the Mugen accelerator and prepares a collision, feeding off of power from the national power grid that she has hacked. Airi, who was involved in posting the video of Saraka to the Internet, crashes his car through the East Side building, allowing Motokazu to climb to the electric hut and play a rock version of Beethoven's 9th for Saraka, causing her to stop the experiment. She attempts to commit suicide by jumping from a bridge but Motozaku convinces her to come to him and eat the sushi he made and brought for her.

Airi commits suicide and Saraka is arrested. Motozaku fights with the media and lands in prison, where he writes his final thesis on the theory of sushi relativity. Yoshikazu is deported from India and returns. Saraka is eventually released and visits Motozaku at his sushi bar.

== Cast ==
- Hayato Ichihara as Yoshikazu Watanuki / Motokazu Watanuki
- Mitsuki Tanimura as Saraka
- Kenichi Endō as Chief of power station
- Yusuke Hirayama
- Yuriko Ishida as Ms. Hatomura
- Nozomu Iwao as Sudo
- Masaya Kikawada as Airi
- Yoshio Kojima as Student
- Jun Kunimura as Murakami
- Rio Matsumoto as Shiratori
- Naomasa Musaka as Gonda
- Eugene Nomura
- Reisen Ri as Yamada
- Ayumu Saito
- Takashi Sasano as Hashizume
- Christian Storms as TV Interviewer
- Taro Suwa as Owner of Sushi Shop
- Koutaro Tanaka as Sakura
- Mayumi Wakamura as Saraka's mother

== Production and release ==
God's Puzzle is a film adaptation of the novel of the same name by Shinji Kimoto.

Filming took place in Mito, Ibaraki, Japan.

The film was also promoted under the title The Puzzle of God.

== Reception ==
Rob Nelson of variety.com writes, "Intermittently bizarre rather than thoroughly so, the pic plays by CG-powered rules of a smart-kids-save-the-world actioner, adding Miike’s wacky narrative digressions and a bit of animation to mostly enjoyable effect." He complains that "Miike’s most conventional pic is least convincing in its serious moments, as would-be stimulating debates of God’s existence ring hollow" but writes that "pic’s cinematography — in 35mm, with short India-set scenes on DV — is vibrant, and the FX kick up a storm."

Pedro Morata of Asian Movie Pulse wrote that the film offers "a full spectacle worthy of the best films of natural disasters" as well as "a well-constructed visual presentation, with particularly well-designed frames", ultimately finding that it is "Definitely worth watching."

Author Tom Mes of Midnight Eye acknowledges that Miike's "films can be hit and miss" and that "business is still as usual", but states that, "as is so often the case with a Miike film, a closer look proves to be most rewarding. The devotee will recognize in God's Puzzle's obsession with the creation, annihilation and meaning of life a continuation of the questions posed in earlier films by the director", concluding that "this is still the familiar Miike universe. We are merely exploring different corners."
