= Tokugawa Fūunroku Hachidai Shōgun Yoshimune =

Tokugawa Fūunroku Hachidai Shōgun Yoshimune (徳川風雲録 八代将軍吉宗) is a television program broadcast on January 2, 2008, on the TV Tokyo network in Japan. It was the 28th in the annual Shinshun Wide Jidaigeki series. Ten hours long, it began at 2:00 p.m. and ran until midnight.

== Cast ==
The production stars Masatoshi Nakamura as Tokugawa Yoshimune, eighth Tokugawa shogun. Asahi Uchida portrays Ten'ichi-bō, a youth portrayed as a son of the young Yoshimune. Ken Ishiguro is Ōoka Tadasuke.

Yoshimune's mother, Oyuri, is Rino Katase. Sakurai Sachiko, Misato Tanaka, Yoko Minamino, Miki Sakai, Tomoka Kurotani (as Ejima), Yumiko Takahashi, Waka Inoue, Sachiko Kokubu, and Mari Hoshino appear.

Veteran actor Hiroki Matsukata plays Tokugawa Mitsusada, Yoshimune's father. Mito Mitsukuni, who supported Yoshimune's bid to become shogun, is portrayed by Makoto Fujita. Teruhiko Saigō portrays Ōishi Kuranosuke, leader of the Forty-seven Ronin, and Toshiyuki Nishida (whose major roles include Yoshimune in the NHK Taiga drama based on his life) takes the role of Kinokuniya Bunzaemon. Another veteran Yoshimune, Ken Matsudaira (for 25 years the star of Abarenbō Shōgun), appears as Tsuchiya Mondonosuke.

== Plot ==
The program is based on the two-volume historical novel Yoshimune to Ten'ichi-bō by Renzaburō Shibata, the author who wrote the Sleepy Eyes of Death (Nemuri Kyōshirō) series and Gokenin Zankurō. Shunka Nagasaka (the director of Kamen Rider X, Japan Sinks, Ultraman Zearth) wrote the script. Ichikura Haruo and Kōjirō Fujioka are the directors. The show is a joint production of TV Tokyo and Toei.

== Sources ==
- Belluna Shinshun Wide Jidaigeki Tokugawa Fūunroku at TV Tokyo
