= Zatoichi and the Chest of Gold =

- Directed by: Kazuo Ikehiro
- Written by: Shozaburo Asai; Akikazu Ota; Kan Shimozawa (story)
- Produced by: Hiroshi Ozawa
- Starring: Shintaro Katsu
- Cinematography: Kazuo Miyagawa
- Edited by: Takashi Taniguchi
- Music by: Ichirō Saitō
- Production company: Daiei Film
- Distributed by: Daiei Film
- Release date: 14 March 1964
- Running time: 83 minutes
- Country: Japan
- Language: Japanese

Zatoichi and the Chest of Gold (座頭市千両首, Zatōichi senryō-kubi) is a 1964 Japanese Chambara film directed by Kazuo Ikehiro starring Shintaro Katsu as the blind masseur Zatoichi, originally released by the Daiei Motion Picture Company (later acquired by Kadokawa Pictures). It also stars Tomisaburo Wakayama who would later play the lead in the Lone Wolf and Cub series.

Zatoichi and the Chest of Gold is the sixth episode in the 26-part film series devoted to the character of Zatoichi, following Zatoichi on the Road and preceding Zatoichi's Flashing Sword.

== Plot ==
Ichi travels to the village of Itakura to pay respects at the grave of a man he killed two years earlier. At the grave he reminisces on a fight between the two yakuza gangs (Iioka and Sasagawa from an earlier film) one man ran away and, though Ichi was not taking part in the fight, attacked Ichi. The dead man's sister, Chiyo, overhears Ichi say this to himself.

Ichi is invited to take part in a village celebration: after three years of drought and near famine they and seventeen other villages in Usui county have raised 1,000 Ryo with which to pay taxes to the local intendant. Ichi gladly joins in while the locals sing of their hero Chuji- who lives in the hills with a troupe, hiding from the constabulary while protecting the villagers. As they transport the gold to the local intendant (Gundayu) they are ambushed by three samurai (led by Jushiro, who wields a whip) and then by a larger band. Several of the villagers are slain and the rest flee. When the robbers chase the chest of gold to the base of the hill, they find Ichi sitting atop it smoking his pipe. He kills several men when attacked and the rest flee. In the village the local men accost Ichi, blaming him for its theft, before he promises to find the gold. The conversation is overheard by a well dressed woman called Ogin. Taking the backroads to avoid government checkpoints he encounters her again. When she questions his motive for being on the backroad he replies that he could not tell, as he is blind and then asks her why she is on the same road.

In the onsen at her destination Ogin takes a private room only for Ichi to rise from the water. He recognizes her and reassures her that he is blind and can see nothing (else he would be peeking, and at this he squirts two men who are peeping through a window on the roof) and they briefly talk. When she leaves she sees the sister, Chiyo, and asks why she has been following Ichi from Itakura. On Mt Akagi several of Chuji's troupe inform him that some of the men were killed by a blind man with a sword, only for Ichi to arrive to ask Chuji why he stole the money. Ichi informs the bandit that some of his men have gone rogue and stolen the chest of gold- though the two men are quick to confess and ask that he kill them for their acts. Losing his taste for the bandit life style, Chuji decides to leave and asks Ichi to take a different route- in order to escort the young nephew of one of the troupe to safety, before thanking Ichi for his faith in him.

In the nearby town, Ogin (the lover of Monji), accompanied by Chiyo, tells Monji about Ichi going to the bandits and Monji promises revenge for the sister. Monji has just been promoted to head of the local constabulary and received his jitte (one pronged iron truncheon) as mark of office. He organizes a number of men to capture Ichi and the bandits on Mt Akagi. Ichi hears them coming and raises the alarm system the bandits set up at the bottom of the mountain, attracting the police and killing many of them to allow the others more time to escape. However the others are soon trapped and die defending their boss.

The next morning in an inn, Monji talks with Jushiro about their plan, but the other two samurai are disgruntled at being treated poorly when they learn of a blind gambler doing well at the dice hall. They approach him and after Jushiro cuts a mon coin in half by throwing his sword in the air, they bet Ichi 35 Ryō that he can't do the same. He accepts and wins. Outside, he confronts the two samurai whose conversation he overheard. While they deny knowledge, one of them inadvertently reveals the intendant's involvement. Ichi pays them 10 Ryō, but they still attack him and are killed.

The Itakura village headman pleads for Intendant Gundayu to be lenient as the tax money was stolen. Gundayu accuses the headman of lying, insisting that the tax be paid in ten days. Jushiro talks to Gundayu, with Monji present, and reveals that Gundayu is the recipient of the stolen 1000 Ryō and demands more money. Ichi arrives and Jushiro calls Ichi a worm, though he wants to kill him privately so that the other two men get no pleasure from seeing their enemy killed. Monji orders his men to capture Ichi but Jushiro knocks them back with his whip, saying they will only die and Ichi leaves unmolested. Gundayu orders the headman and three other village men executed at dawn. On his return to Itakura, Ichi is mobbed, but they stop when some calls him a blind fool and his demeanour changes. He leaves and Chiyo follows him. He says he sensed who she was from the start and she pleads with Ichi to save them.

The Itakura villagers had hoped to launch an attack against Gundayu's troops, believing they have nothing to lose, but lose heart when it's learned that he has deployed eight musketeers as part of his force. However, Zatoichi launches a surprise attack and succeeds in killing the riflemen. Learning of this, Monji and Gundayu panic. Gundayu starts to destroy written evidence of the crime, saving himself while implicating Monji, when Monji demands half the gold, only to be killed by Gundayu. Ichi arrives as Gundayu flees and says Gundayu can atone by giving the farmers a receipt for their taxes and returning the gold to them. He attacks Ichi and is killed. Jushiro arrives and says he does not want the gold but to meet him at Bodai Temple in an hour. Chiyo is waiting for Ichi and he gives her the gold. He also gives his gambling winnings for a proper headstone for her brother. Chiyo, possibly taken with Ichi, pleads with him to stay for the forthcoming celebration in the village.

Jushiro arrives at the duel on a horse and wraps his whip around Ichi's neck, dragging him along behind and causing Ichi to drop his sword. However, Jushiro drags him back past his sword. Ichi pulls Jushiro from his horse, then reclaims his weapon and kills him, and apparently starts back towards the village to keep his promise to celebrate with Chiyo...

== Cast ==
- Shintaro Katsu as Zatoichi
- Shogo Shimada as Chuji Kunisada
- Machiko Hasegawa as Ogin
- Tomisaburo Wakayama as Jushiro
- Tatsuya Ishiguro as Enzo
- Matasaburo Niwa as Asataro
- Hikosaburo Kataoka as Iwajiro
- Mikiko Tsubouchi as Ochiyo

== Production ==
Video Watchdog stated that the sixth entry in the series marks a change with the previously conservative styled Zatoichi series. For example, the film contains a theatrical credit sequence.

== Reception ==
Video Watchdog described the film as "comparatively audacious" compared the earlier Zatoichi films, with director Kazuo Ikehiro "extends his experimental touch to key montages (scenes of frantic villagers are connected by a series of swish-pans, including one that propels us in an unexpected vertical direction)."
