= Onna Gokuakuchō =

1970 film directed by Kazuo Ikehiro

- Film poster
- Directed by: Kazuo Ikehiro
- Written by: Jun'ichirō Tanizaki
- Screenplay by: Seiji Hoshikawa
- Produced by: Atsuhiko Suguro
- Starring: Michiyo Yasuda; Masakazu Tamura; Shin Kishida; Akiko Koyama; Kei Satō
- Cinematography: Toshio Kajiya
- Edited by: Toshio Taniguchi
- Music by: Takeo Watanabe
- Production company: Daiei Kyoto
- Distributed by: Daiei Film
- Release date: April 4, 1970 (Japan)
- Running time: 82 minutes
- Country: Japan
- Language: Japanese

Onna Gokuakuchō (Japanese: おんな極悪帖) also known as Naked Ambition, is a 1970 Japanese jidaigeki film directed by Kazuo Ikehiro. It is based on Jun'ichirō Tanizaki's novel Kyōfu Jidai. All the characters in the film are villains. Kazuo Ikehiro said the film is his favorite film along with Hitori Okami among the films he directed.

== Plot ==
Wicked woman Ogin is a mistress of Tayu. At first Ogin gains power by poisoning lawful wife of Tayu. To gain more power Ogin let her lover Isogai Iori, kill whoever interrupts her.

== Cast ==
- Michiyo Yasuda as Ogin no Kata
- Masakazu Tamura as Isogai Iori
- Shin Kishida as Tayu
- Kei Satō as Shunto (Daimyo)
- Akiko Koyama as Umeno
- Kogan Ashiya as Chinsai (Monk)
- Natsuko Oka as Oyui
- Takeshi Date as Ujiei Samon
- Rinichi Yamamoto as Akaza Matajūrō
- Yuzō Hayakawa as Suganuma Hachirōta
- Hōshei Komatsu as Hosoi Gentaku
- Kimiko Tachibana as Wet Nurse

== Production ==
- Yoshinobu Nishioka - Art director
