= Momochi =

Momochi (ももち) may refer to:

== Places ==
- Momochi-hama (百道浜) or Momochi seaside (シーサイドももち) , seaside area in Fukuoka city, Fukuoka Prefecture

== People ==
Given name

- Momoko Tsugunaga (nicknamed Momochi) (born 1992), former Japanese idol singer (Berryz Kobo)

Surname

- Goromaru Momochisakura (born 1977), Japanese sumo wrestler. (He took the name after the above-mentioned Momoko Tsugunaga.)
- Hiroko Momochi (born 1986), Japanese singer-songwriter
- Momochi Tanba , Japanese shinobi
- Yusuke Momochi (born 1986), Japanese fighting games player
