= Hello! Sandybell =

Japanese anime television series

- Screenshot from the series, featuring Sandybell and Oliver, the dog.
- ハロー!サンディベル
- Genre: Adventure, slice-of-life, drama
- Screenplay by: Noboru Shiroyama; Hirohisa Soda
- Directed by: Hiroshi Shidara (Chief Director)
- Music by: Takeo Watanabe
- Country of origin: Japan
- Original language: Japanese
- No. of episodes: 47

Production
- Producer: Yuyake Usui (TV Asahi)
- Production companies: TV Asahi; Asatsu; Toei Animation

Original release
- Network: ANN (TV Asahi)
- Release: March 6, 1981 – February 26, 1982

Hello! Sandybell (ハロー!サンディベル, Haro! Sandiberu) is an anime series made by Toei Animation in 1981. It was aired in Japan by TV Asahi.

In the original title when it was first made in Japan, an "E" was added to the title; "Sandybelle".

Similarly to Silver Fang, the show is relatively unknown in the U.S. but was quite popular in Asia, Latin America, Arab countries and Europe, particularly Scandinavia. It first aired in France in La Cinq in the late 1980s, starting on 15 April 1988. The series depicts four years in Sandybell's life as she goes from 12–16 years old.

== Plot ==
Hello! Sandybell is the story of a girl who lives in Scotland with her father. She spends her time playing with her faithful dog (Oliver) and her friends. One, day she meets the Countess Wellington, a kind-hearted woman living in the castle near their village. She also meets Kitty, an arrogant young lady who lives in the large mansion outside their village.

Kitty hates Sandybell and constantly visits the Countess in the hope of winning the love and interest of her son, Marc, who falls in love with Sandybell. The Countess gives Sandybell a white narcissus and she plants it outside the village. She also brings other flowers and plants them around the narcissus, making a small garden of flowers around it. Sandybell treasures the lily because it reminds her of her deceased mother.

Sandybell's goal throughout the series is to find her mother someday. In the final episodes, they finally reunite. However, upon their meeting Sandybell finds that her mother has amnesia, and Sandybell fails to convince her that she was her daughter. Later, when a young child falls into the water and Sandy saves his life, flashbacks strike her mother and she remembers the past.

== Staff ==
- Series Director: Hiroshi Shitara
- Episode Director: Kazumi Fukushima
- Original Story: Shiroh Jinbo
- Script: Hiroshisa Soda, Makoto Sakurai, Noboru Shiroyama
- Music: Takeo Watanabe
- Character Design: Makoto Sakurai
- Background Art: Eiji Itô
- Planning: Yasuo Yamaguchi
- Production manager: Akira Sasaki
- Theme Song Arrangement: Joe Hisaishi
- Theme Song Lyrics: Yoshiko Miura
- Theme sung by Mitsuko Horie
- Production: TV Asahi, Asatsu Shinsha, Toei
