= Zatoichi's Revenge =

- DVD cover

Japanese name
- Kanji: 座頭市二段斬り
Transcriptions
- Revised Hepburn: Zatōichi nidan-kiri
- Directed by: Akira Inoue
- Written by: Minoru Inuzuka
- Based on: Zatoichi by Kan Shimozawa
- Produced by: Shozaburo Asai
- Starring: Shintaro Katsu; Sachiko Kobayashi
- Cinematography: Fujio Morita
- Edited by: Hiroshi Yamada
- Music by: Akira Ifukube
- Production company: Daiei Studios
- Release date: April 3, 1965 (Japan)
- Running time: 84 minutes
- Country: Japan
- Language: Japanese

Zatoichi's Revenge (Japanese: 座頭市二段斬り, Hepburn: Zatōichi nidan-kiri) is a 1965 Japanese chambara film directed by Akira Inoue and starring Shintaro Katsu as the blind masseur Zatoichi. It was originally released by the Daiei Motion Picture Company (later acquired by Kadokawa Pictures).

Zatoichi's Revenge is the tenth episode in the 26-part film series devoted to the character of Zatoichi.

== Plot ==
Zatoichi's travels have finally brought him back to the village where he was trained in the arts of the masseur, nearly ten years ago by his old sensei, Master Hikonoichi. His proximity to his former teacher compels him to pay a visit, only to learn that Hikonoichi was recently killed while traveling, and his daughter Sayo has been sold into prostitution to repay the money lent to her father by local business man Tatsugoro. Zatoichi sets out to free Sayo, only to discover that the entire village is suffering—victims of a scheme that has either forced their daughters into prostitution, or into doing the bidding of Tatsugoro, who is working for the corrupt Intendant, Isoda. Sayo provides him with the toggle of a medicine pouch, recovered from her father's hand.

While intentionally baiting Hikonoichi's killer by jingling the toggle, Ichi befriends the local Dice Dealer Denroku (the Weasel) and his daughter, Tsuru. The girl's cheerful and idealistic nature reminds him of Sayo. The following day, while Ichi enjoys a profitable run of dice in the gambling house, a Rōnin that had been observing him since his arrival bets 100 Ryō against Ichi's cane (which he knows to be a sword). When Denroku attempts to cheat, Ichi exposes his sleight of hand—revealing that his own bet won. The Rōnin calmly departs, with a warning that the two of them are not finished. Tatsugoro's men try to balk on paying, but Zatoichi easily overpowers them and takes his winnings from their chest, then tosses a single Ryō coin to the dealer—a "tip", to shame him—and leaves. The men confront Ichi to reclaim the 100 Ryō, but five are killed by Ichi and the survivors flee. Denroku apologizes, explaining that he was instructed to switch the dice, though Zatoichi reveals that he bears him no ill-will, remarking on his own past dealings with Yakuza. Grateful, Denroku explains that the Rōnin is Koheita Kadokura—Tatsugoro's chief enforcer. Zatoichi tells Denroku to "take good care" of his daughter, then leaves—with the man performing his dice flourish as a gesture of respect to him.

Tatsugoro is outraged at the incident and confronts Kadokura over it. The swordsman reveals Zatoichi's identity to him, theorizing that he's close to tracing Hikonoichi's murder back to them because of the medicine toggle. The arrival of Tax Inspector Jingo Odate panics Tatsugoro and Isoda, who plans to bribe him with 100 Ryō. Kadokura knows Odate—a respectable Samurai—and remarks that he cannot be bribed for any sum, then offers to kill both Odate and Zatoichi in exchange for the sum. He intercepts Odate while on horseback to confront Isoda over his fraud and waylays him. He next confronts Zatoichi while drinking sake at the inn, and offers him a drink before demanding he set the time for their battle. Ichi allows him to choose, and Kadokura declares they'll fight at dusk at Utsune Bridge—where he killed Hikonoichi. Tatsugoro uses the losses at the dice hall to extort Denroku—demanding that he steal Zatoichi's sword, or hand Tsuru over to him, to be used in the brothel (unaware that she overheard them). Isoda instructs Tatsugoro to rally their men in order to launch a mass attack on Zatoichi, further declaring that they'll frame him for the murder of Odate.

Kadokura attacks Zatoichi at the bridge, where he reveals that Intendant Isoda ordered Hikonoichi's death. When he doesn't rise to his feet, Kadokura moves to finish him off, but Zatoichi gets up and wounds him. The swordsman attempts to continue the fight, but is quickly dispatched by Zatoichi. In the village, Tsuru steals Zatoichi's sword and brings it to her father. Denroku, depressed at seeing his influence in the act, gets drunk and staggers about the village in search of Tatsugoro. He arrives at a noodle stand, where he orders more sake and drunkenly bemoans his predicament—that the loss of his only child is the same as the loss of a blind man's cane. Zatoichi then reveals himself, in place of the stand's proprietor, and compels Denroku to lead an honest life for Tsuru's sake.

With his sword reclaimed, Zatoichi then moves to confront both Tatsugoro and Isoda at the Intendant's home and takes them hostage. With Denroku's help, he destroys the legal bonds used to control the people and redistributes their money to them. Tatsugoro's and Isoda's men ambush Zatoichi and a fight ensues, resulting in dozens of them slain by Ichi. During the confusion, Denroku picks up a discarded sword and—thanks to his years of perfecting his dice skills—surprises himself with his skill in fighting with a katana.

Both Tatsugoro and Isoda are killed at the entrance of the brothel, in front of the very women they'd exploited. The next morning, Sayo, Denroku, and Tsuru all meet at Hikonoichi's grave marker, where they discover that Zatoichi has already visited ...

== Cast ==
- Shintaro Katsu as Zatoichi
- Norihei Miki as Denroku
- Mikiko Tsubouchi as Osayo
- Takeshi Kato as Koheita Kadokura
- Fujio Harumoto as Isoda
- Sachiko Kobayashi as Tsuru
- Sonosuke Sawamura as Boss Tatsugoro
- Gen Kimura as Jingo Odate

== Production ==
- Yoshinobu Nishioka - Art director

== Reception ==
=== Critical response ===
Brian McKay, writing for eFilmCritic.com, gave Zatoichi's Revenge five out of five stars and said that it "is one of the best in the long-running series to date, mixing in a bit of social commentary with the usual staples of swordplay, humor, and pathos. Plus, it shows him felling whoremongers (I couldn't resist one more) like a weed-whacker —what more could you ask for?"
