= Dog×Police =

2011 Japanese film

- Poster advertising this film in Japan
- Directed by: Go Shichitaka
- Produced by: Takahiro Sato
- Starring: Hayato Ichihara; Erika Toda; Jun Murakami; Takanori; Takeyama; Shinnosuke Abe; Saburo Tokito
- Production company: Japan NTV
- Distributed by: Toho
- Release date: October 1, 2011
- Running time: 104 minutes
- Country: Japan
- Language: Japanese
- Box office: $8,976,044

Dog×Police is a 2011 Japanese film directed by Go Shichitaka, about a special division of the Tokyo Metropolitan Police Department which uses trained dogs in cases of terrorism, violent crime, and rescue missions. The film is based on the novel by Yoichi Komori.

== Plot ==
Yusaku Hayakawa (Hayato Ichihara) dreamed of one day becoming a detective. Instead, he now works as a trainer for police dogs at the Tokyo Metropolitan Police Department. One day, Yusaku gets an Albino Shepherd named Shiro whom others say can never become a police dog due to a genetic disorder. Nevertheless, Yusaku and Shiro become attached as he trains Shiro to become a guard dog. Sometimes guard dogs are treated as equipment and other times required to become a human shield, but Yusaku and female police officer Natsuki (Erika Toda) are against this. A series of explosions then take place as a serial bomber strikes Tokyo.
