= Zatoichi's Flashing Sword =

- Film poster
- Directed by: Kazuo Ikehiro
- Written by: Shozaburo Asai; Minoru Inuzuka; Kan Shimozawa (story)
- Produced by: Masaichi Nagata
- Starring: Shintaro Katsu; Tatsuo Endô; Takashi Etajima
- Cinematography: Yasukazu Takemura
- Music by: Sei Ikeno
- Release date: 11 July 1964 (Japan)
- Running time: 82 minutes
- Country: Japan
- Language: Japanese

Zatoichi's Flashing Sword (Japanese: 座頭市あばれ凧, Hepburn: Zatōichi abare dako) is a 1964 Japanese chambara film directed by Kazuo Ikehiro starring Shintaro Katsu as the blind masseur Zatoichi. It was originally released by the Daiei Motion Picture Company (later acquired by Kadokawa Pictures).

Zatoichi's Flashing Sword is the seventh episode in the 26-part film series devoted to the character of Zatoichi.

== Plot ==
A lone yakuza musketeer chases after Ichi alongside a canal and shoots him in retaliation for Ichi cutting the yakuza boss and to earn the prestige of his more experienced fellows. His fellow yakuza arrive and he claims to have killed Ichi, but without a corpse they don't believe him. Ichi is rescued from the water and a travelling stranger pays a local townswoman to nurse Zatoichi back to health. When well again Ichi travels to the stranger's home town to express his gratitude. The yakuza learn of Ichi's survival and his destination. They go after him and leave the failed shooter behind. He goes alone to make up for his lost face.

On the way to Kajikazawa, Ichi passes by a sword dojo being roughed up by some stray ronin. Ichi laughs and the four ronin challenge him with shinai. He mocks them for wanting to beat up a blind man then defeats them all in a few seconds. When Ichi arrives in Kajikazawa, he finds that the stranger was not a man but was Kuni, daughter of Bunkichi, one of the two town bosses. Her father is planning a free fireworks display and goes across the river to talk to rival boss Yasugoro. Yasugoro wants control of the river ford as all travellers have to pay to cross.

Ichi stays with Kuni and does chores around the house and massages around town. He massages Yasugoro's sister in Yasugoro's house and overhears that Yasugoro and the local government Inspector, who is sleeping with the sister, are conspiring to force control away from Bunkichi.

The musketeer arrives in town and is revealed to be Seiroku, Bunkichi's son who fled town after racking up drinking debts and refusing to pay. He soon sees Ichi.

The four ronin arrive Yasugoro hires them to kidnap Seiroku. Yasugoro's men claim Seiroku tried to kill Yasugoro. They say Bunkichi can either hand over the river right's, fight or they will kill Seiroku. Yasugoro's sister tells Yasugoro that the Inspector says to kill the prisoner to start a war.

The Yakuza pursuing Ichi find him at the river bathing. He goes into deeper water and when they follow, he kills them while submerged. He goes to Yasugoro's house, knocks Yasugaro and Yasugoro's sister unconscious, and frees Seiroku. Seiroku proves ungrateful. He goes home and lies about escaping by himself.

The lead ronin comes up with a plan to break Ichi's alliance with Bunkichi. Yasugoro sends a letter to Bunkichi claiming the Intendant will mediate at a meeting. Bunkicihi arrives and Yasugoro claims the mediator isn't present because Yasugoro wants Bunkichi to have a chance to give up the famous fugitive Ichi rather than have Bunkichi arrested for harbouring the criminal. Bunkichi falls for the deceit and sends Ichi on his way. Ichi is confused about why he is being forced to leave before the fireworks and refuses the money Bunkichi offers. Kuni is distressed that Ichi must leave and that she can't say why. As he says goodbyes to the household he tells Seiroku, having recognised Seiroku by scent when Seiroku arrived at home, that "you really shouldn't shoot people with guns" then he leaves town.

With Ichi gone Yasugoro attacks Bunkichi's house killing almost everyone present (but not Kuni and her sister who are safe in a locked storeroom). Ichi, wishing to see, or at least be close to, the fireworks turns back and over hears the ronin, who are camped outside of town, as they brag about the plan. Ichi kills them and goes to Yasugoro's house to exact retribution. He cuts down the candles and forces them to fight in the dark. After killing Yasugoro he stands for a moment in the light of the fireworks.

== Cast ==
- Shintaro Katsu as Zatoichi
- Naoko Kubo as Okuni
- Mayumi Nagisa as Oshizu
- Takashi Edajima as Seiroku
- Tatsuo Endō as Boss Yasugoro
- Yutaka Nakamura as Mekichi
- Bokuzen Hidari as Kyubei
- Ryosuke Kagawa as Bunkichi
- Ikuko Mori as Yasugoro's sister
