= Shiho Fujimura =

Japanese actress (1939–2025)

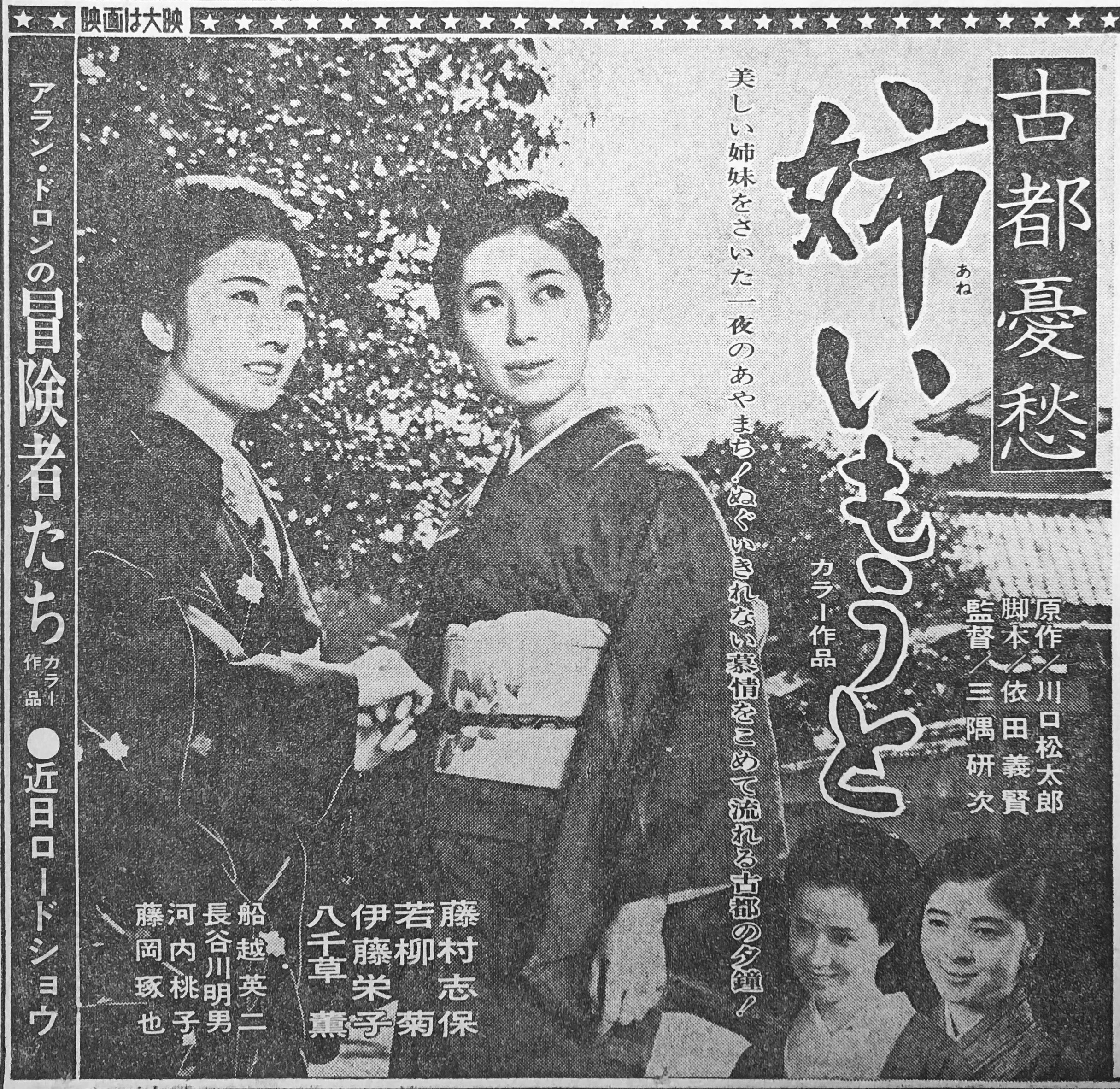
- Born: Misao Shizunaga; 3 January 1939; Kanagawa Prefecture, Japan
- Died: 12 June 2025 (aged 86)
- Occupation: Actress
- Years active: 1962–2025

Shiho Fujimura (藤村 志保 Fujimura Shiho, 3 January 1939 – 12 June 2025) was a Japanese actress. She was given a Special Prize for her career at the 2008 Yokohama Film Festival. Fujimura died on 12 June 2025, at the age of 86.

== Filmography ==
=== Film ===
- Shinobi no Mono (1962)
- The Whale God (1962)
- Shinobi no Mono 2: Vengeance (1963)
- Zatoichi on the Road (1963)
- Akumyō Muteki (1965)
- Return of Daimajin (1966)
- Shiroi Kyotō (1966)
- Zatoichi's Cane Sword (1967)
- The Snow Woman (1968)
- Fumō Chitai (1976)
- Tora-san Plays Cupid (1977)
- Kozure Ōkami: Sono Chiisaki Te ni (1993)
- Bloom in the Moonlight (1993), Tatsu Taki
- Wait and See (1998)
- Gemini (1999)
- Merdeka 17805 (2001)
- Inugami (2001)
- Yunagi City, Sakura Country (2007)
- Inju: The Beast in the Shadow (2008)

=== Television ===
- Taikōki (1965), Nene
- Ōgon no Hibi (1978), Yodo-dono
- Musashibō Benkei (1986), Tokiwa Gozen
- Taiheiki (1991), Uesugi Kiyoko
- Fūrin Kazan (2007), Jukei-ni
