= Shinobi no Mono =

Series of 1960s novels by Tomoyoshi Murayama

A theatrical poster for the 1966 film Shinobi no Mono Shin Kirigakure Saizō

Shinobi no Mono (忍びの者) is a series of jidaigeki novels written by Tomoyoshi Murayama originally serialized in the Sunday edition of the newspaper Akahata from November 1960 to May 1962. "Shinobi no mono" is the long form of the phrase meaning "ninja".

== Novels ==
Set during Japan's Sengoku period, the novels depict Goemon Ishikawa, a famous outlaw hero who was boiled alive at the end of the 16th century by order of Hideyoshi Toyotomi, as a ninja who fought against samurai warlords.

Vol.	Japanese title	Romanization	Year	Publisher
1	忍びの者1 序の巻	Shinobi no Mono 1 Jo no Maki	1962	Rironsha
2	忍びの者2 五右衛門釜煎り	Shinobi no Mono 2 Goemon Kamairi	1965	Rironsha
3	忍びの者3 真田忍者群	Shinobi no Mono 3 Sanada Ninja-gun	1967	Rironsha
4	忍びの者4 忍びの陣	Shinobi no Mono 4 Shinobi no Jin	1969	Rironsha
5	忍びの者5 忍び砦のたたかい	Shinobi no Mono 5 Shinobi-toride no Tatakai	1971	Rironsha

== Films ==
Between 1962 and 1966, a series of eight Shinobi no Mono films (aka Ninja, a Band of Assassins, aka Ninja Spy) starring Raizo Ichikawa were produced and released by the Daiei Motion Picture Company. The first three films are based on the novel, while the five subsequent films are based on four original screenplays by Hajime Takaiwa (also the screenwriter on the first three films) and one original screenplay by Kinya Naoi.

No.	Japanese title	Romanization	English release title	Release date	Time period	Director
1	忍びの者	Shinobi no Mono	Shinobi no Mono	1962.12.01	1575-1581	Satsuo Yamamoto
2	続・忍びの者	Zoku Shinobi no Mono	Shinobi no Mono 2: Vengeance	1963.08.10	1582-1594	Satsuo Yamamoto
3	新・忍びの者	Shin Shinobi no Mono	Shinobi no Mono 3: Resurrection	1963.12.28	1595-1600	Kazuo Mori
4	忍びの者 霧隠才蔵	Shinobi no Mono Kirigakure Saizō	Shinobi no Mono 4: Siege	1964.07.11	1614-1615	Tokuzō Tanaka
5	忍びの者 続・霧隠才蔵	Shinobi no Mono Zoku Kirigakure Saizō	Shinobi No Mono 5: Mist Saizo Returns	1964.12.30	1616	Kazuo Ikehiro
6	忍びの者 伊賀屋敷	Shinobi no Mono Iga-Yashiki	Shinobi No Mono 6: Iga Mansion	1965.06.12	1637-1651	Kazuo Mori
7	忍びの者 新・霧隠才蔵	Shinobi no Mono Shin Kirigakure Saizō	Shinobi no mono 7: Mist Saizo Strikes Back	1966.02.12	1616	Kazuo Mori
8	新書・忍びの者	Shinsho Shinobi no Mono	Shinobi no mono 8: Three Enemies	1966.12.10	1570-1573	Kazuo Ikehiro
9^{*}	忍びの衆	Shinobi no Shū	Mission: Iron Castle	1970.02.07	1582	Kazuo Mori

^{*} Following the death of series lead Raizo Ichikawa in 1969, Daiei attempted to revive/continue the series with a 9th film entitled 忍びの衆 Shinobi no Shū (Ninja Spies) starring Hiroki Matsukata, who also replaced Ichikawa in their other popular series Nemuri Kyoshiro.

== Television series ==
The novels were also adapted into a 52-episode television series starring Ryuji Shinagawa and co-produced by the Toei Company and television network NET (now known as TV Asahi) and broadcast from July 24, 1964 to July 30, 1965. Only the first episode remains in existence.

Japanese title	Romanization	English title	Series run	# of episodes
忍びの者	Shinobi no Mono	Ninja Spy	1964–1965	52
