= Momochi Tanba =

- 百地 丹波

Personal details
- Born: 1556 Iga Province, Japan
- Died: June 7, 1640 (aged 83–84) Tsu Domain, Iga Province, Japan

Momochi Shinzaemon Masanishi (Japanese: 百地 新左衛門 正西; 1556–1640), better known as Momochi Tanba (百地 丹波), was a Japanese samurai and shinobi.

== Biography ==
Momochi is said to have been the overseer (jitō) of a manorial estate owned by the Kōfuku-ji in northern Yamato Province. His father was Momochi Masanaga (百地 正永).

Oda Nobunaga, who sought to unify Japan, was concerned by the independence of the Iga ikki. When his son Oda Nobukatsu invaded Iga Province in 1579, Momochi's home was destroyed and he fled to Mount Kōya. He later led local Iga men (伊賀の物) in a guerilla campaign which saw the Oda armies repelled from Iga. Momochi is credited as one of the commanders who led the ambush at Onikobu Pass where the Oda general Tsuge Yasushige was killed by a shinobi sniper.

In 1581, Momochi was one of the defenders of Iga-Kashihara Castle when it was overrun by the forces of Oda Nobunaga. He escaped the castle alive and reportedly lived on into the early 17th century, dying in 1640. His descendants were known to have settled in Yamato Province.

== Legacy ==
During the Edo period, Momochi was fictionalized into a folkloric character and archetypical master shinobi named Momochi Sandayū, credited in popular yomihon novels as the ninjutsu teacher of Ishikawa Goemon and Kirigakure Saizō. Momochi Sandayū was one of the first characters referred to as a "Great Shinobi" (大忍び, ō-shinobi).
