= Akira Inoue (film director) =

Japanese writer and director (1928–2022)

- Born: 10 December 1928; Kyoto, Japan
- Died: 9 January 2022 (aged 93)
- Occupation: Film director
- Years active: 1960–2022
- Known for: Zatoichi's Revenge; Nemuri Kyōshirō series

Akira Inoue (井上昭, Inoue Akira; 10 December 1928 – 9 January 2022) was a Japanese film director.

== Biography ==
He is known for directing many jidaigeki television dramas. In 1950, he joined the Daiei studio and started working as an assistant director. He made his director debut with Yureikoban in 1960. He directed a lot of jidaigeki television dramas from 1970s to 1980s.

In 1993, he directed Lone Wolf and Cub series film Lone Wolf and Cub: Final Conflict, it was for the first time in 23 years he directed in the film.

Inoue died from a cerebral infarction and pneumonia on 9 January 2022, at the age of 93.

== Selected filmography ==
=== Film ===
- Yurei Koban (1960) ) (First film Inoue directed.)
- Zatoichi's Revenge (1965)
- Dr.Strong-arm (1966)
- Sleepy Eyes of Death 7: The Mask of the Princess (1966)
- The Whimsy of Cupid (1967)
- An Invitation to Jail (1967)
- Rikugun Nakano gakko: Mitsumei (1967)
- Rikugun Nakano gakkô: Kaisen zen'ya (1968)
- Woman's Prison'7 (1968)
- Duel at the Quay aka Kanto onna yakuza (1968)
- Kanto onna do konjo (1969)
- Lone Wolf and Cub: Final Conflict (1993)
- Konuka Ame (2017)
- Korosuna (2022)

=== Television ===
- Nemuri Kyōshirō (TV series) (1972) Episode 1, 6, 10, 12, 17, 18, 24, 26
- Unmeitōge (1974)
- Zatoichi Monogatari (1974–78)
- Tokyo Megure Keishi (1978)
- Nemuri Kyoshiro: Conspiracy at Edo Castle (1993)
- Kawaite sōrō Hahawa Ikiteita? (1993)
- Nemuri Kyoshiro: The Woman Who Loved Kyoshiro (1998)
- Kenkaku Shobai Sukedachi (2004)
