= Lone Wolf and Cub: Final Conflict =

- Film poster
- Directed by: Akira Inoue
- Written by: Tsutomu Nakamura
- Based on: Lone Wolf and Cub by Kazuo Koike
- Produced by: Kazuo Koike
- Starring: Masakazu Tamura; Yūko Kotegawa; Yushi Shoda; Mayumi Wakamura; Isao Hashizume; Renji Ishibashi; Kunie Tanaka; Kimiko Ikegami; Shiho Fujimura; Shima Iwashita; Tatsuya Nakadai
- Cinematography: Saburo Fujiwara
- Music by: Masahiro Kawasaki
- Production companies: Shochiku; Kazuo Koike Office
- Distributed by: Shochiku
- Release date: February 6, 1993 (Japan)
- Running time: 119 minutes
- Country: Japan
- Language: Japanese

Lone Wolf and Cub: Final Conflict (Japanese: 子連れ狼 その小さき手に, Hepburn: Kozure Ōkami: Sono Chiisaki Te ni) is a 1993 Japanese film directed by Akira Inoue. It is based on Kazuo Koike's manga series Lone Wolf and Cub. Masakazu Tamura played Ogami by Koike Kazuo's strong request. Koike produced the film on the theme of parent-child love, not action as with past Lone Wolf and Cub films and television drama series.

== Plot ==
Set in Japan during an unspecific year of the Edo period, Ogami Ittō, a samurai serving the Tokugawa shogun as "Kogi Kaishaku-nin" (official executioner) is the target of a Yagyu clan conspiracy, masterminded by Shogunate councilor Yagyu Bizen, to have him dismissed and replaced with a member of their own family. When evidence appears to show that he is plotting against the Shogun, a Yagyu retainer kills Ogami's wife when she tries to intervene, for which Ogami cuts him and the accompanying retainers down. Ogami is convicted of treason, and the Bushido code requires him to commit seppuku; instead, he defies the Tokugawa Shogun's orders and picks up the sword with his young son against his enemies, determined to expose the Yagyu conspiracy, eventually leading to a final duel against Yagyu Retsudo, leader of the Ura-Yagyu clan and Bizen's brother.

== Cast ==
- Masakazu Tamura as Ogami Ittō
- Tatsuya Nakadai as Yagyū Retsudō
- Yushi Shoda as Ogami Daigoro
- Isao Hashizume as Yagyū Bizen (Retsudō's younger brother)
- Shima Iwashita as Oharu (Prostitute)
- Kimiko Ikegami as Yagyū Chizuro (Yagyū Hyōgo's wife)
- Renji Ishibashi as Matsudaira Suo no Kami
- Chōichirō Kawarasaki as Nitani Kenmotsu
- Hiroyuki Okita as Yagyū Hyōgo
- Hirotarō Honda as Samurai (executed by Ogami Ittō)
- Yūko Kotegawa as Ogami Asami (Ogami Itto's Wife)
- Tōru Masuoka as Yagyū Kurando
- Junkichi Orimoto as Rōjū of Tokugawa shogunate
- Kunie Tanaka as Oshou
- Mayumi Wakamura as Yagyū Nanao (Retsudō's daughter)
- Shiho Fujimura as Shino

== Other Credits ==
- Executive producer
  - Yoshinobu Nishioka
- Art Direction by
  - Yoshinobu Nishioka

== Release ==
Lone Wolf and Cub: Final Conflict was released theatrically in Japan on 6 February 1993 where it was distributed by Shochiku.

== Awards ==
- Japanese Academy Awards:
  - Best Supporting Actor: Kunie Tanaka
