= Takeo Watanabe =

- 渡辺 岳夫
- Born: April 16, 1933; Tokyo, Japan
- Died: June 2, 1989 (aged 56)
- Father: Urato Watanabe
- Musical career
- Genre: Anime music
- Occupation: Composer
- Years active: 1959–1989

Takeo Watanabe (渡辺 岳夫, Watanabe Takeo; April 16, 1933 – June 2, 1989) was a Japanese musician and composer. In addition to composing the well known theme song for Cutie Honey he has also composed music for multiple anime television series and films including Lone Wolf and Cub, Candy Candy, and Mobile Suit Gundam.

Tomei Tengu BGM written and performed by Takeo Watanabe was used in the soundtrack of the 2003 movie Lost in Translation fourteen years after his death. In 2008 Takeo Watanabe posthumously received an Award of Merit from the Tokyo International Anime Fair. He died at the age of 56.

== Biography ==
Eldest son of Urato Watanabe (渡邊浦人, Watanabe Urato). Graduated from Musashi(?) University he studied music in Paris, France.

== Works ==
=== Television ===
==== Animation ====
- Star of the Giants (巨人の星, Kyojin no Hoshi; 1968)
- Attack No. 1 (アタックNo.1, Atakku Nanbā Wan; 1969)
- Mako, the Mermaid (魔法のマコちゃん, Mahō no Mako-chan; 1970) - See The Little Mermaid
- Genius Bakabon (天才バカボン, Tensai Bakabon; 1971)
- Cutie Honey (キューティーハニー, Kyūtī Hanī; 1973)
- Heidi, Girl of the Alps (アルプスの少女ハイジ, Arupusu no Shōjo Haiji; 1974)
- Little Meg the Witch Girl (魔女っ子メグちゃん, Majokko Megu-chan; 1974)
- A Dog of Flanders (フランダースの犬, Furandāsu no Inu; 1975)
- Candy Candy (キャンディ・キャンディ, Kyandi Kyandi; 1976)
- Rascal the Raccoon (あらいぐまラスカル, Araiguma Rasukaru; 1977)
- Nobody's Boy - Remi (家なき子, Ie Naki Ko; 1977)
- Invincible Super Man Zambot 3 (無敵超人ザンボット3, Muteki Chōjin Zanbotto 3; 1977)
- Invincible Steel Man Daitarn 3 (無敵鋼人ダイターン3, Muteki Kōjin Daitān 3; 1978)
- Magical Girl Tickle (魔女っ子チックル, Majokko Chikkuru; 1978)
- The Perrine Story (ペリーヌ物語, Perīne Monogatari; 1978)
- Mobile Suit Gundam (機動戦士ガンダム, Kidō Senshi Gandamu; 1979)
- Littl' Bits (森の陽気な小人たち ベルフィーとリビット, Mori no Yōki na Kobito-tachi: Berufi to Rirubitto; 1980) (In the English version of this series as well as in adaptations based on the English version, Watanabe's score was replaced with one by Haim Saban and Shuki Levy.)
- Hello! Sandybell (ハロー！サンディベル, Harō! Sandeiberu; 1981)
- Little Women (若草の四姉妹, Wakakusa no Yon Shimai; 1981)
- Lady Georgie (レディジョージィ, Redi Jōjī; 1983)

==== TV dramas ====
- The White Tower (白い巨塔, Shiroi Kyotō; 1978)

==== Historical dramas ====
- Nemuri Kyōshirō (眠狂四郎; 1972)
- Lone Wolf & Cub (子連れ狼, Kozure Ōkami; 1973)
- Amigasa Jūbei (編笠十兵衛, Amigasa Jūbei; 1974-75)
- Ōoku (大奥; Ōoku) 1983

=== Theatrical releases ===
==== Movies ====
- (ja) Hakuja komachi (1958) Actor
- Invisible Demon (透明天狗, Tomei Tengu; 1960)
- The Ninja: A New Beginning (1966)
- (ja) Nemuri Kyoshiro 9: Burai-Hikae masho no hada (1967)
- (ja) Waka oyabun o kese (1967)
- (ja) Waka oyabun senryū-hada (1967)
- When the Cookie Crumbles (1967)
- (ja) Bakuto retsuden (1968)
- The Daring Nun (1968)
- Lone Wolf Isazo (1968)
- Nemuri Kyoshiro 10: Onna jigoku (1968)
- Nemuri Kyoshiro 12: Akujo-gari (1969)
- Priest and the Gold Mint (1968)
- The Valiant Red Peony (1968)
- Broken Swords (1969)
- Nemuri Kyōshirō manji giri (1969)
- The Valiant Red PeonyFlower Cards Match (1969)
- Watch Out, Crimson Bat! (1969)
- Crimson Bat - Oichi: Wanted, Dead or Alive (1970)
- The Invisible Swordsman (1970)
- The Return of the Desperado (1970)
- (ja) Asobi (1971)
- Chivalrous Woman (1971)
- Duel of Swirling Flowers (1971)
- (ja) Kaihei yon-gō seito (1971)
- Fearless Avenger (1972)
- Trail of Blood (1972)
- The Cockroach (1973)
- Cockroach Cop (1973)
- Slaughter in the Snow (1973)
- (ja) Hiroshima jingi: Hitojichi dakkai sakusen (1976)
- The Shadowstar (1976) soundtrack
- Shogun's Sadism (1976)
- (ja) Piranha-gundan: Daboshatsu no ten (1977)
- あばれはっちゃく (1979)
- (ja) Miira no hanayome: Kindaichi Kōsuke sirīzu: Arashi no yoru ni ubugoe ga kikoeru (1983)
- Serendipity Stories: Friends on Pure Island (1983)
- Fugitive Samurai (1984)
- (ja) Gokumon-iwa no kubi: Kindaichi Kōsuke shirîzu (1984)
- (ja) Mori no tonto tachi (1984)
- (ja) Kōsui shinjū: Yokomizo Seishi supesharu (1987)
- (ja) Fushichō: Kindaichi Kōsuke no kessaku suiri (1988)
- Lost in Translation (2003) soundtrack

==== Animated Movies ====
- 30000 Miles Under the Sea (1971)
- Boy of the Wilderness Isamu (1973)
- Candy Candy - The Call of Spring (キャンディ・キャンディ 春の呼び声, Kyandi Kyandi - Haru no Yobigoe; 1978)
- Candy Candy - Candy's Summer Vacation (キャンディ・キャンディ キャンディの夏休み, Kyandi Kyandi - Kyandei no Natsu Yasumi; 1978)
- Mobile Suit Gundam I (1981)
- Mobile Suit Gundam II: Soldiers of Sorrow (1981)
- Mobile Suit Gundam III: Encounters in Space (1982)
- Candy Candy Movie (キャンディ・キャンディ, Kyandi Kyandi; 1992) soundtrack

== See also ==
- A student of Watanabe, film composer Joe Hisaishi became famous for scoring Hayao Miyazaki films.
