= Kazuo Ikehiro =

Japanese writer and director (1929–2025)

- Born: 25 October 1929; Tokyo, Japan
- Died: 15 October 2025 (aged 95); Tokyo, Japan
- Occupation: Film director
- Years active: 1950–2025
- Known for: Zatoichi series Nemuri Kyōshirō series and Onna Gokuakuchō

Kazuo Ikehiro (池広一夫, Ikehiro Kazuo; 25 October 1929 – 15 October 2025) was a Japanese film director. He is known for directing Zatoichi series and the highly acclaimed film Onna Gokuakuchō.

In 1950, he joined the Daiei Film and started working as an assistant director under Kenji Mizoguchi etc. In 1960, he was promoted to director and debuted with Bara Daimyo.

Ikehiro died of a heart attack in Tokyo, on 15 October 2025, at the age of 95.

== Selected filmography ==
=== Film ===
- Bara Daimyo (1960)
- Zatoichi and the Chest of Gold (1964)
- Zatoichi's Flashing Sword (1964)
- Shinobi No Mono 5: Return of Mist Saizo (1964)
- Sleepy Eyes of Death 4: Sword of Seduction (1964)
- Zatoichi's Pilgrimage (1966)
- Sleepy Eyes of Death 9: A Trail of Traps (1967)
- Lone Wolf Isazo ひとり狼 hitori ookami (1968)
- Broken Swords (1969)
- Sleepy Eyes of Death 12: Castle Menagerie (1969)
- Nemuri Kyōshirō manji giri (1969)
- Onna Gokuakuchō (1970)
- Kesho (1984)

=== Television ===
- Nemuri Kyōshirō (TV series) (1972) Episode8,11
- Kogarashi Monjirō (1972) Episode5,9
- Amigasa Jūbei (1974-7) Episode9,10
- Monkey (TV series) (1978) Episode15,16,25,26
- Shūchakueki Series (1990-2022) Episode1-38
