= Nemuri Kyōshirō Manji Giri =

- Film poster
- Directed by: Kazuo Ikehiro
- Written by: Yoshikata Yoda
- Starring: Hiroki Matsukata; Masakazu Tamura; Ichirō Nakatani; Yôko Namikawa; Kikko Matsuoka
- Music by: Takeo Watanabe
- Distributed by: Daiei Film
- Release date: 20 December 1969 (Japan)
- Running time: 88 minutes
- Country: Japan
- Language: Japanese

Nemuri Kyōshirō Manji Giri (Japanese: 眠狂四郎 卍斬り), also known as Sleepy Eyes of Death 14: Fylfot Swordplay, is a 1969 Japanese film directed by Kazuo Ikehiro. It is based on Renzaburō Shibata's novel series Nemuri Kyoshiro. The lead star is Hiroki Matsukata. He played the role of Nemuri Kyoshiro as a replacement for Ichikawa Raizō. In this film, Masakazu Tamura played a villain (he later played Nemuri Kyōshirō in the television series and the following five TV specials).

== Plot ==
Kishiwada clan Senior Vassal Naito Mondo asks Kyōshirō to rape a woman loved by the lord of the Kishiwada clan so that her reputation will be destroyed, as this woman is suspected of being a spy for the Satsuma clan. Kyōshirō agrees and fulfills the request, but also arranges for two Hina Imperial dolls presented to the Kushiwada clan by the Shogunate to be stolen. Later, Kyōshirō is attacked by assassins of the Satsuma clan, but refuses to kill one of them who is a half-breed samurai like Kyōshirō himself. When the Imperial dolls are damaged, Kyōshirō begins a journey to somehow have them repaired and becomes involved in the conflict between the Satsuma and Kishiwada clans as Satsuma assassins continually attempt to kill him.

== Cast ==
- Hiroki Matsukata as Nemuri Kyoshiro
- Masakazu Tamura as Umezu Ichirota
- Yoko Minamikawa as Rei
- Kikko Matsuoka as Chisa
- Ichirō Nakatani as Benjiro Okumura
- Seiichiro Kameishi as Okabe
- Shinzō Hotta as Tōgō Kuranosuke
- Yoshi Katō as Toen
- Yasuhiro Minakami as Ryoma
- Asao Uchida as Toda Suishin
