= God's Puzzle =

2002 Japanese novel by Shinji Kimoto

- Film poster

神様のパズル
- Genre: Science fiction
- Novel
- Written by: Shinji Kimoto
- Published: November 25, 2002
- Manga
- Written by: Masahiro Uchida
- Published by: Flex Comix
- Magazine: FlexComix Blood; FlexComix Next
- Original run: September 11, 2007 – present
- Volumes: 3
- Live-action film
- Directed by: Takashi Miike
- Released: June 7, 2008
- Runtime: 134 minutes

God's Puzzle (神様のパズル, Kamisama no pazuru) is a 2002 Japanese novel by Shinji Kimoto. It has been adapted into a web manga series and a live-action film.

== Live-action film ==
In 2008, Takashi Miike directed a live-action film based on the novel by Shinji Kimoto.

=== Cast ===
- Hayato Ichihara
- Mitsuki Tanimura
- Mayumi Wakamura
- Rio Matsumoto
