= Asahi Uchida =

Japanese actor

- Born: May 30, 1982 (age 44); Tokyo, Japan
- Occupation: Actor
- Years active: 2000–present

Asahi Uchida (内田朝陽, Uchida Asahi) (born 30 May 1982) is a Japanese actor. He will have a central role in Tokugawa Fūun-roku, scheduled for broadcast on January 2, 2008.

== Selected filmography ==
- Godai: The Wunderkind (2020)
- Revolver Lily (2023)
- Service Oath (2026)
