= Enter Kyōshirō Nemuri the Swordman =

1970 film directed by Kazuo Ikehiro

- Film poster
- Directed by: Tokuzō Tanaka
- Screenplay by: Seiji Hoshikawa
- Based on: Renzaburō Shibata
- Starring: Ichikawa Raizō; Tomisaburo Wakayama; Tamao Nakamura
- Cinematography: Chikashi Makiura
- Edited by: Hiroshi Yamada
- Music by: Taichirō Kosugi
- Production company: Daiei Kyoto
- Distributed by: Daiei Film
- Release date: November 2, 1963 (Japan)
- Running time: 82 minutes
- Country: Japan
- Language: Japanese

Enter Kyōshirō Nemuri the Swordman (Japanese: 眠狂四郎 殺法帖, Hepburn: Nemuri Kyōshirō Sappōchō) is a 1963 Japanese Jidaigeki film directed by Tokuzō Tanaka. It was adapted from the novel Nemuri Kyōshirō Buraihikai written by Renzaburō Shibata. It is the first film of a classic Japanese samurai film series Nemuri Kyōshirō.

== Plot ==
Nemuri Kyōshirō is a mixed-blood swordsman. One day, Kyōshirō is attacked by Ninja on his way to a riverside tea-house. A few days later, Kyōshirō has a visit from Chisa, who serves the Kaga Maeda clan. She asks Kyōshirō to protect her from a Chinese man named Chen Sun. Kyōshirō accept her request. However Kyōshirō later hears a surprising fact from Chen Sun.

== Cast ==
- Ichikawa Raizō as Nemuri Kyōshirō
- Tomisaburo Wakayama as Chen Sun (He is a master of Shorinji Kempo.)
- Tamao Nakamura as Chisa
- Katuhiko Kobayashi as Kinpachi
- Kyōko Ogimachi as Utakichi
- Chitose Maki as Mojiwaka
- Sawamura Sōnosuke as Maeda
- Saburo Date as Zeniya Gohei
