= Christian Storms =

American ice sledge hockey player

Personal information
- Full name: Christian Alexander Storms
- Nickname: Stormy
- National team: U.S. Men's Development Sled Hockey
- Born: August 13, 1996 (age 29) Jamestown, New York, U.S.
- Education: Canisius College
- Height: 5 ft 4 in (163 cm)
- Weight: 110 lb (50 kg)

Sport
- Country: United States
- Sport: Ice sled hockey
- Position: Defense
- League: Northeast Sled Hockey League

Christian A. Storms (born August 13, 1996) is an athlete that participates in men's ice sledge hockey. He is currently a member of the United States Men's Development Sled Hockey team, of which he has been a member since 2016. His career began in his youth with the Jamestown Lakers of the Northwest Arena in Jamestown, New York. Other affiliations include the Buffalo Sabres Sled Hockey Team and the Northeast Passage Wildcats.

== About ==
Christian Storms, 23, began his sled hockey career at the age of eight in his hometown of Jamestown, New York. His first venture into parasports, sled hockey (also known as ice sledge hockey and Para ice hockey) is a sport in which players are seated within specialized sleds and propel themselves using two mini hockey sticks equipped with picks on one end. Born with multiple congenital abnormalities, he had developed an immediate affinity for the sled-based sport and its reliance on upper body strength.

== Career ==
=== Buffalo Sabres Sled Hockey Team ===
Since 2014, Storms has played with the Buffalo Sabres Sled Hockey Team, a 501(c)3 not-for-profit organization in Buffalo, New York. Playing as #96, he has been featured as both a player and as a defenseman. He is currently on the Buffalo Sabres Senior roster.

=== U.S. Men's National Development Sled Hockey Team ===
Storms was first selected to the U.S. Men's National Development Sled Hockey Team in July 2016. In July 2019, he was named to the 2019–2020 USA Hockey team for a fourth consecutive season. On this team he has played as #12 in the position of player and of defenseman in 2016–2017, 2017–2018, 2018–2019, and 2019–2020.
