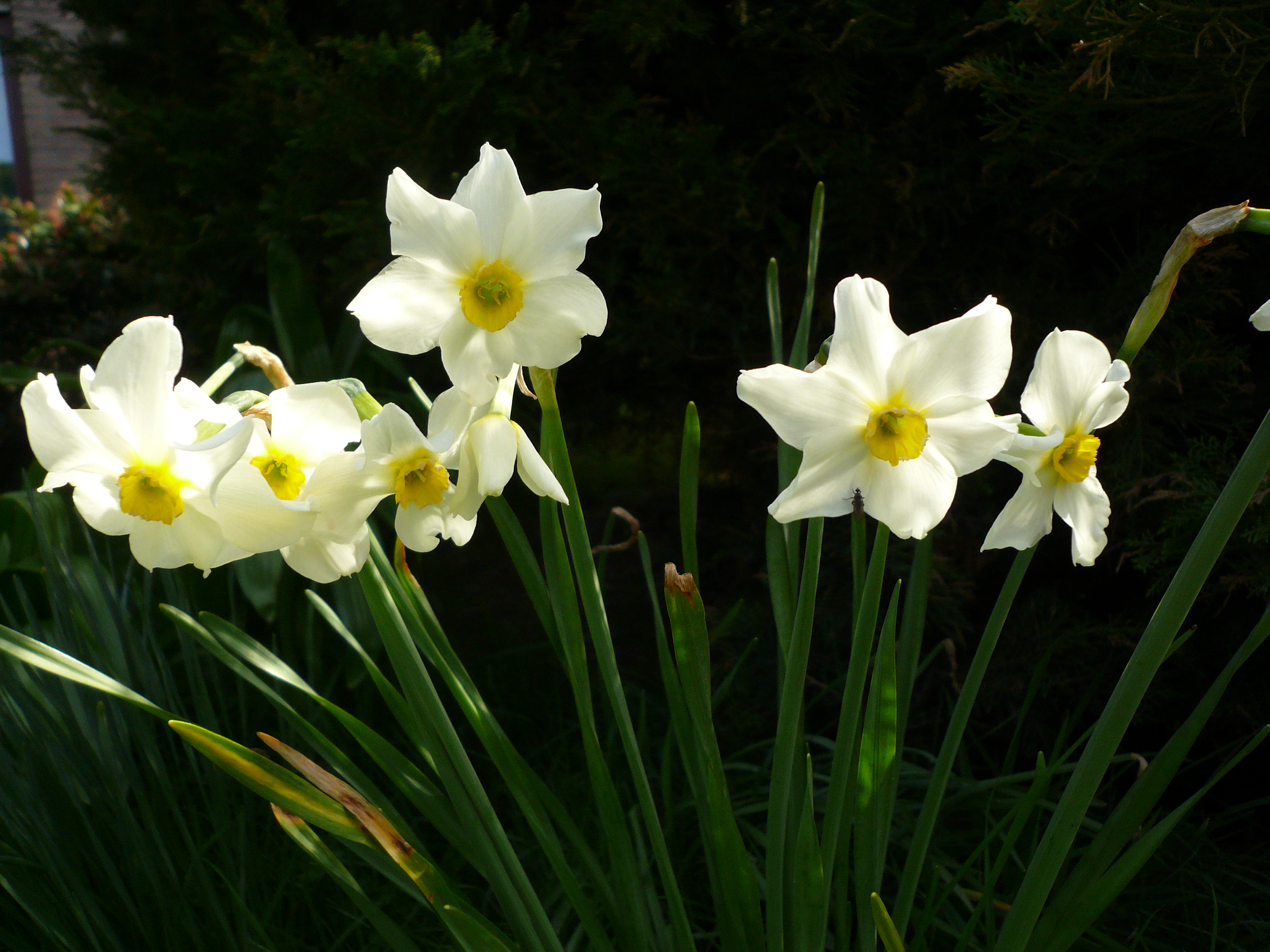

Scientific classification
- Kingdom: Plantae
- Clade: Tracheophytes
- Clade: Angiosperms
- Clade: Monocots
- Order: Asparagales
- Family: Amaryllidaceae
- Subfamily: Amaryllidoideae
- Genus: Narcissus
- Species: N. × medioluteus

Binomial name
- Narcissus × medioluteus Mill.

Synonyms
- Narcissus biflorus Curtis

= Narcissus × medioluteus =

Species of flowering plant

Narcissus × medioluteus (syn. Narcissus biflorus), common names primrose-peerless, April beauty, cemetery ladies, loving couples, pale narcissus, twin sisters, two-flowered narcissus, is a flowering plant, which is a naturally occurring hybrid between Narcissus poeticus and Narcissus tazetta (informally called "poetaz hybrid"). It was found initially in the West of France.

This first poetaz narcissus has long been grown as a garden ornamental and has also become naturalised in Great Britain, Ireland, Switzerland, Spain, Portugal, the former Yugoslavia, Madeira, New Zealand, and in scattered locales in the eastern United States (Michigan, Illinois, Missouri, Indiana, Ohio, Kentucky, Tennessee, Georgia, Alabama, Arkansas, Louisiana, Maryland, North Carolina, South Carolina and Virginia).

The flowers are generally held in pairs, hence the common names "Twin Sisters" and "Loving Couples". The fragrant cream flowers (medioluteus) are smaller than those of Narcissus poeticus. The cup lacks a red edge.

Other poetaz hybrids have several flowers per stem, and some have double flowers.

== Gallery ==
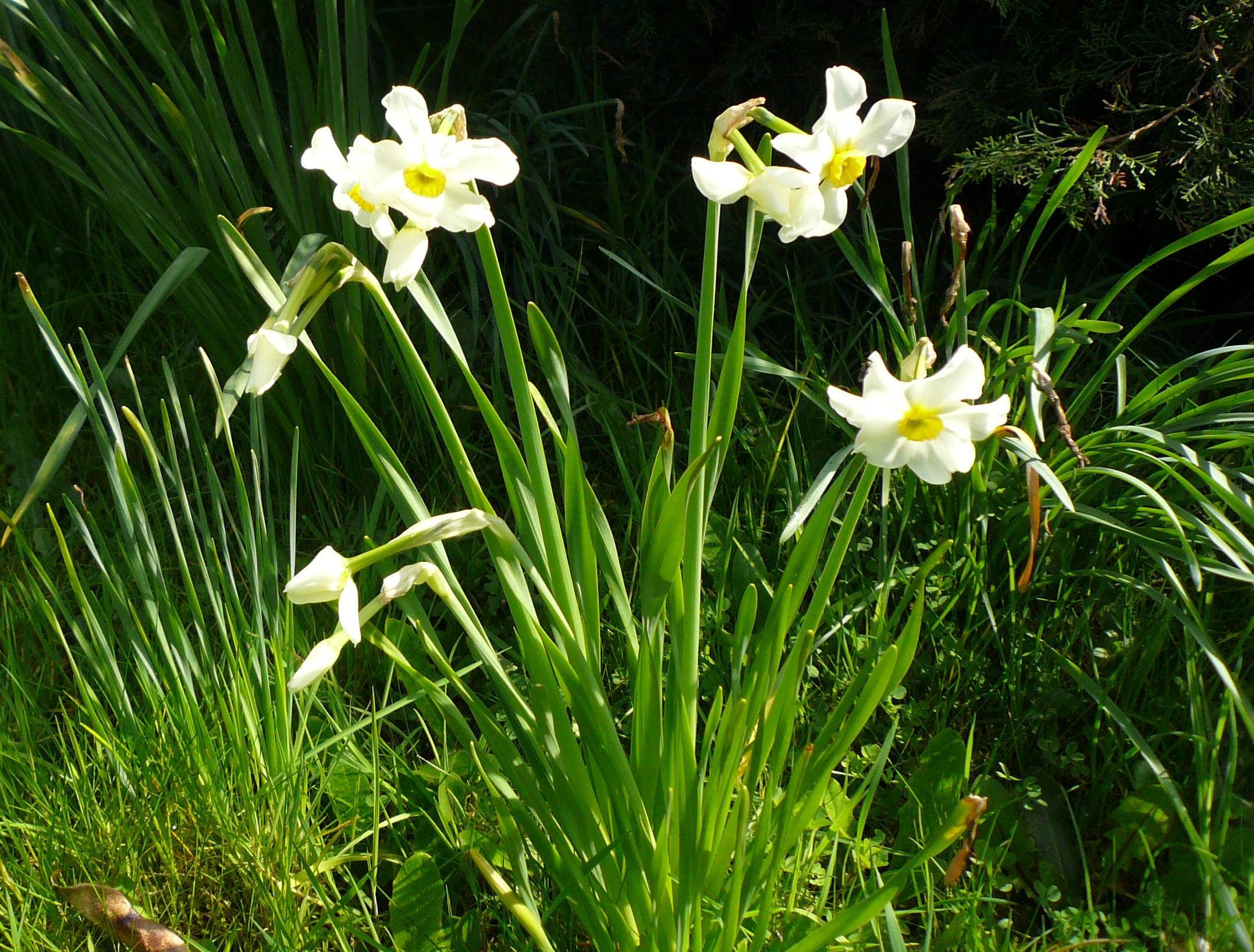
Narcissus × medioluteus plant

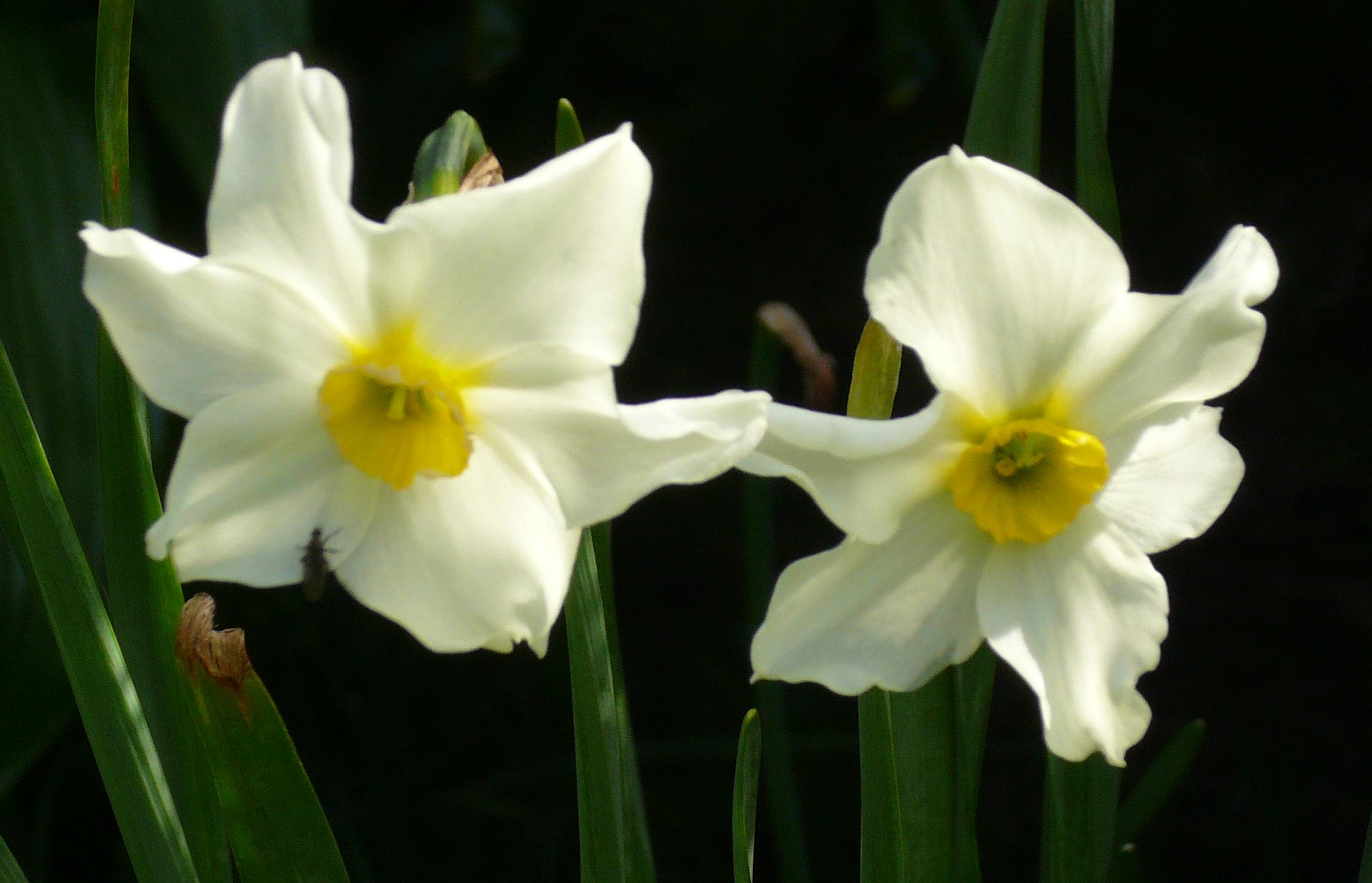
Narcissus × medioluteus with one flower

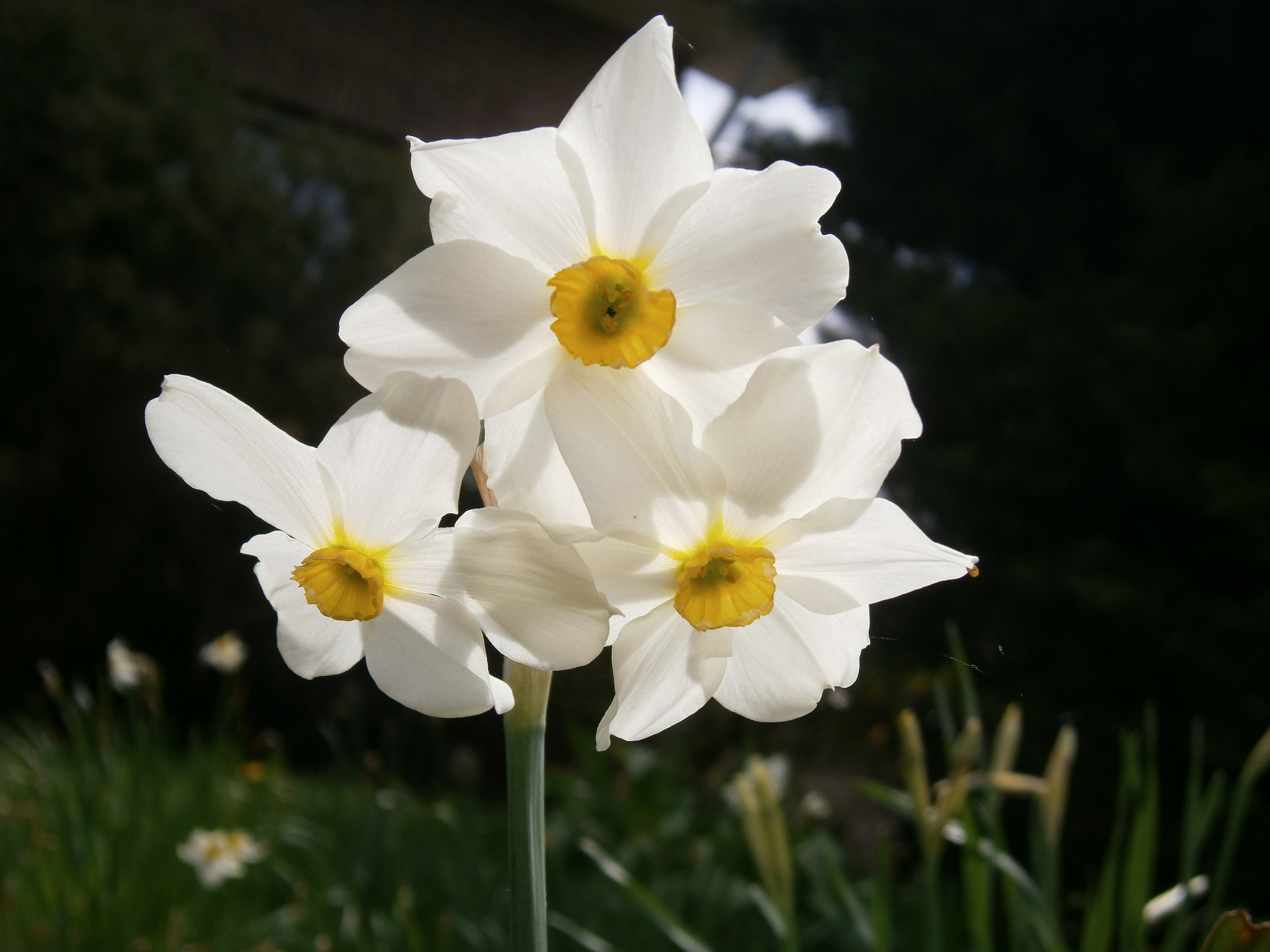
Narcissus × medioluteus with three flowers
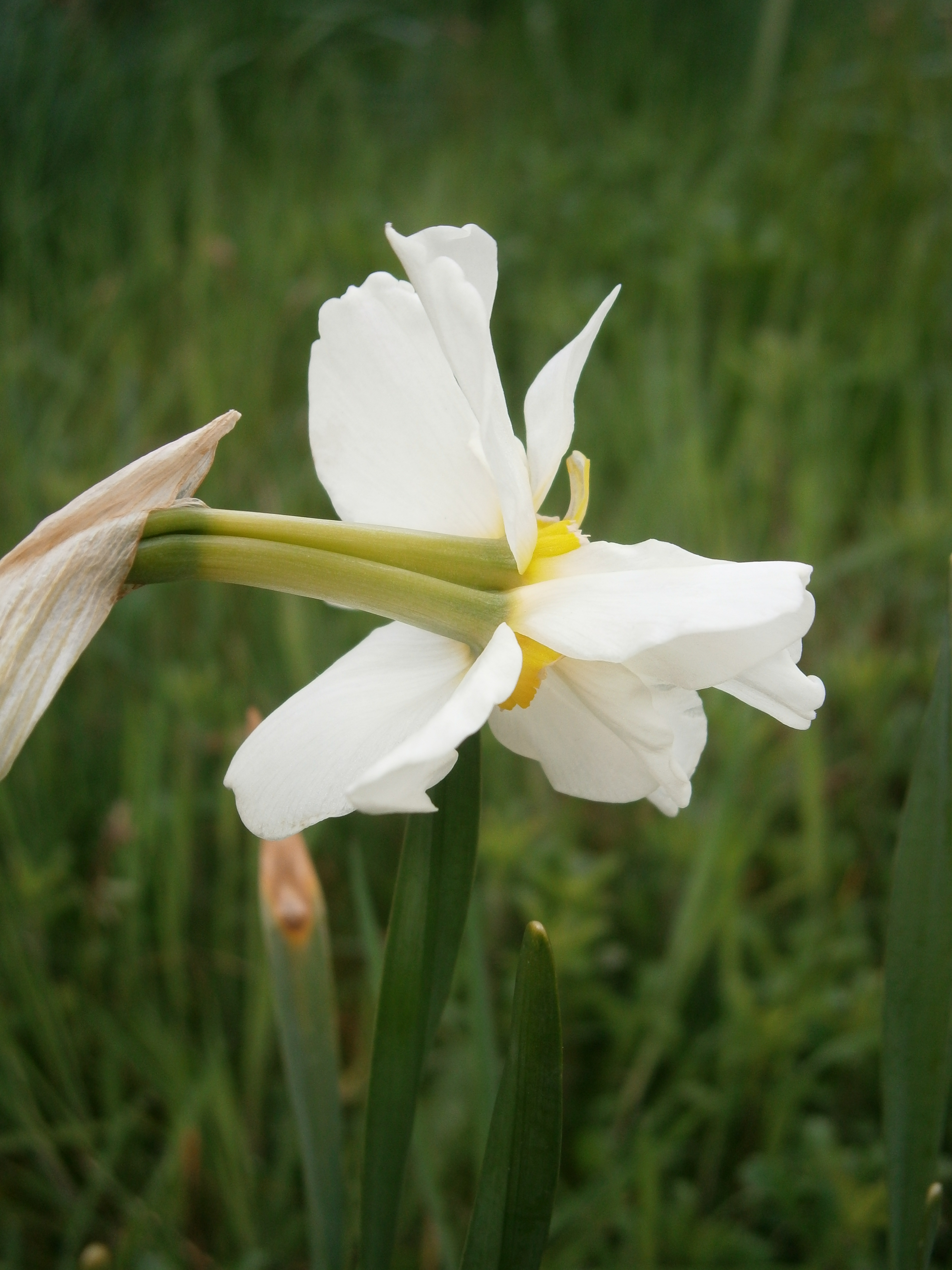
Inflorescence with fasciation

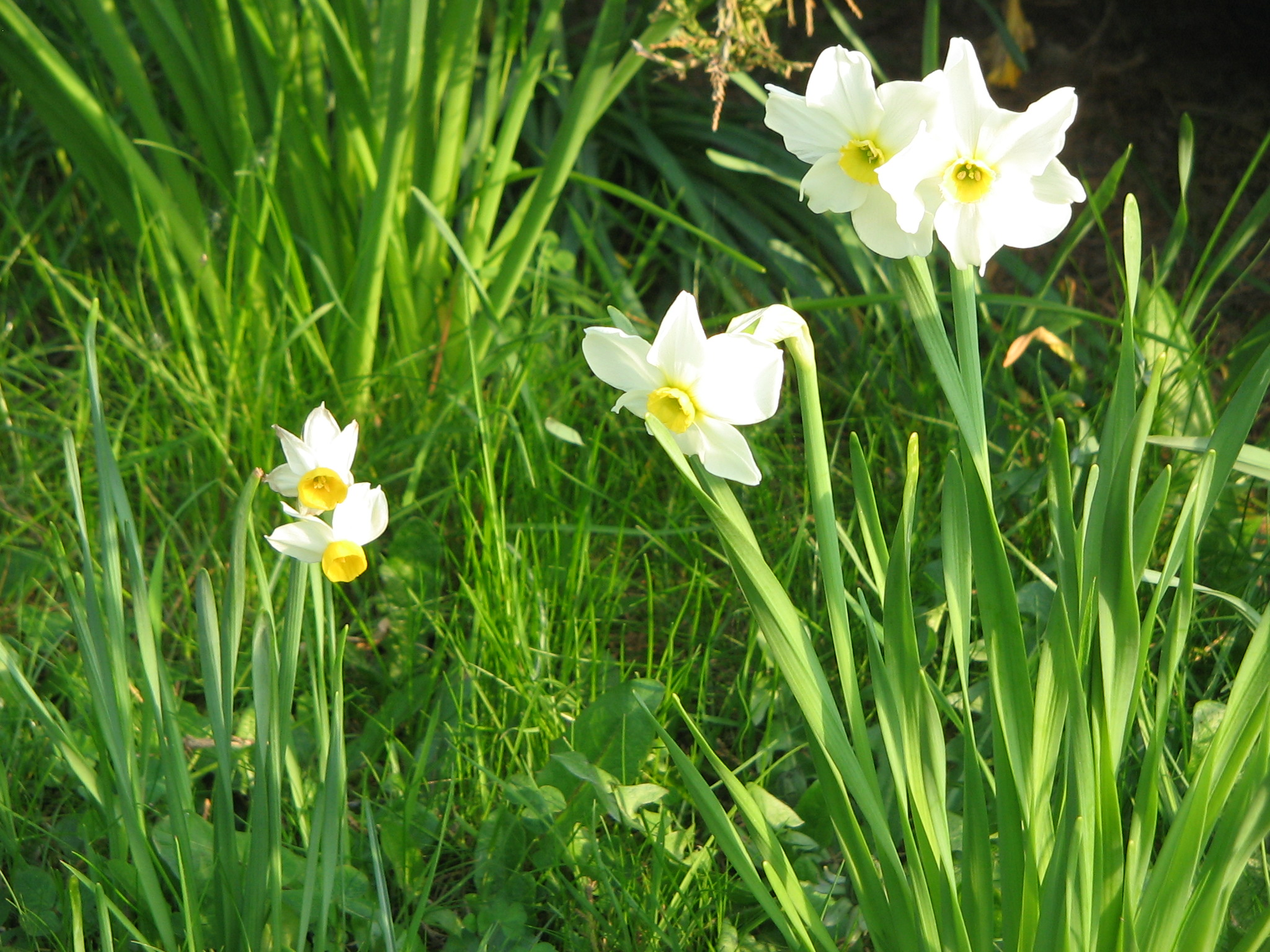
Narcissus tazetta subsp. italicus and Narcissus × medioluteus

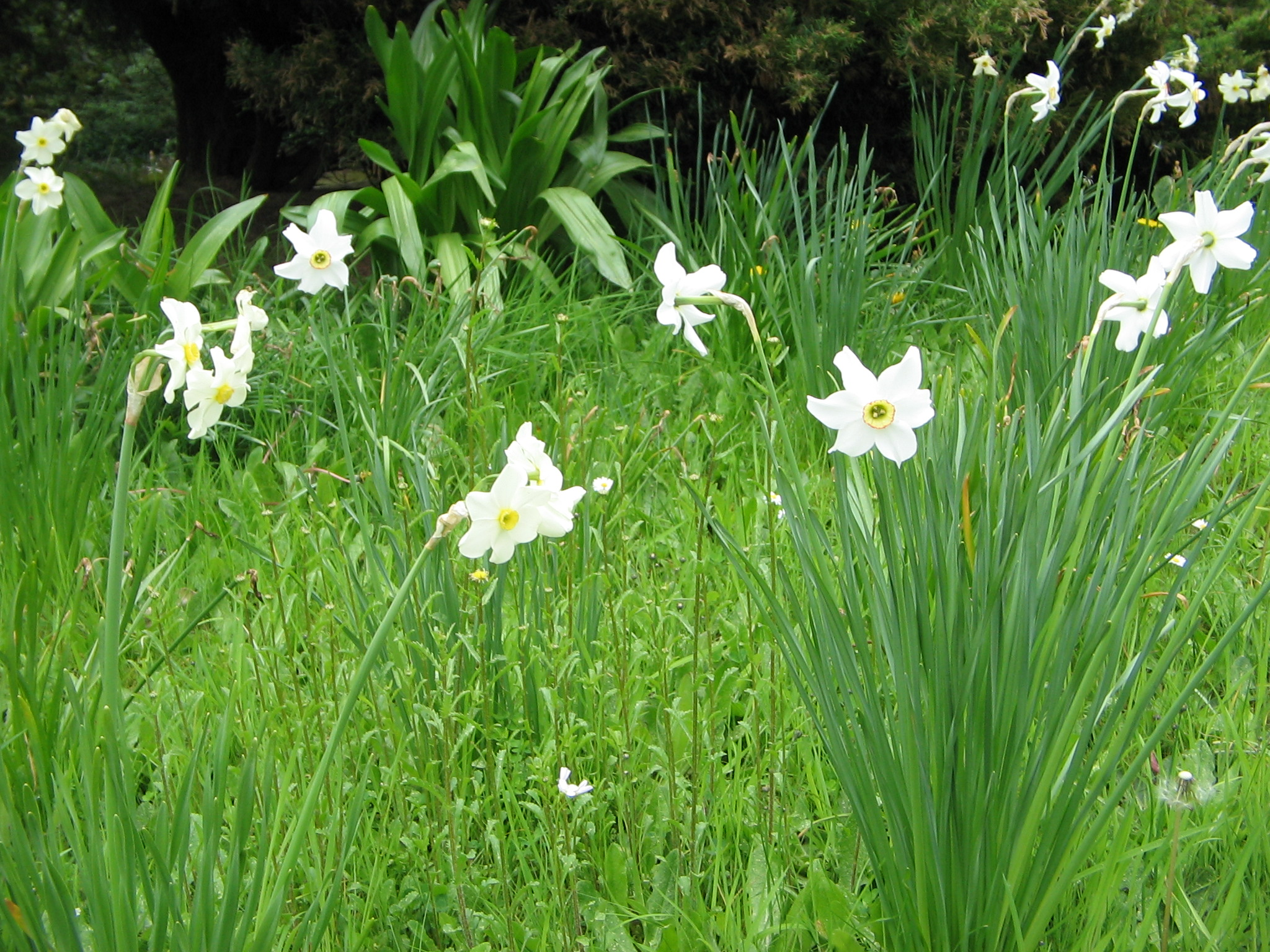
Narcissus × medioluteus and Narcissus poeticus
- photo of herbarium specimen at Missouri Botanical Garden, collected in Missouri, Narcissus x medioluteus
