= Sunae Shibari Dai-nihen =

1927 film

The Spell of the Sand Painting 砂絵呪縛 第二篇 Sunae Shibari Dai-nihen
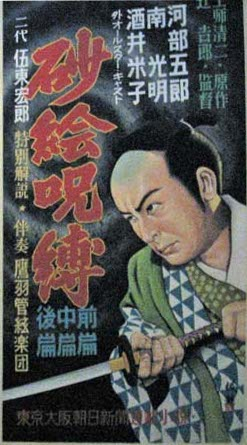
- Japanese movie poster (1927 original ?)
- Directed by: Jukō Takahashi
- Written by: Seiji Haji (story); Tsuneo Matsumoto (writer)
- Produced by: Nikkatsu
- Release date: 3 November 1927 (Japan)
- Running time: 50 minutes
- Country: Japan
- Language: silent

The Spell of the Sand Painting (Japanese: 砂絵呪縛 第二篇, Hepburn: Sunae Shibari Dai-nihen) is a 1927 black-and-white silent Japanese film directed by Jukō Takahashi.

== Cast ==
- Katsutaro Asami as Monkichi
- Kanji Ishii as Jūshirō Morio
- Miharu Ito as Tsuyuji
