= Zatoichi on the Road =

- DVD cover
- Directed by: Kimiyoshi Yasuda
- Written by: Minoru Inuzuka
- Produced by: Ikuro Kubokawa
- Starring: Shintaro Katsu; Shiho Fujimura
- Cinematography: Shozo Honda
- Music by: Akira Ifukube
- Release date: 30 November 1963 (Japan)
- Running time: 87 minutes
- Country: Japan
- Language: Japanese

Zatoichi: On the Road (Japanese: 座頭市喧嘩旅, Hepburn: Zatōichi kenka-tabi) is a 1963 Japanese Chambara film directed by Kimiyoshi Yasuda starring Shintaro Katsu as the blind masseur Zatoichi, originally released by the Daiei Motion Picture Company (now known as Kadokawa Pictures). Zatoichi: On the Road is the fifth episode in the 26 part film series devoted to the character of Zatoichi.

== Plot ==
Ichi is being taken to Doyama, all expenses paid by an employee of Doyama crime boss Hikozo, on the promise of just meeting with Hikozo, no obligation to do anything. On the way his guide is killed by Hikozo's rivals who overheard Ichi and his guide at a tea house. Ichi kills them including the husband of Hisa, a woman who watches the short fight. She tells him this when he asks and they part coolly.

At night he encounters a group of samurai looking for a girl. They leave and Ichi discovers the man they have just mortally wounded. He asks Ichi to protect a girl named Mitsu, the girl for whom the others are looking, and escort her to Edo (the capital, nowadays called Tokyo) where her family can protect her. He finds the exceptionally well-dressed girl hiding in a nearby shed. Ichi kills two men who come into the shed looking but another man escapes. Sometime during their travel Mitsu reveals that she is being hunted because she stabbed the local lord in the face with her hairpin when he tried to rape her.

They reach an inn where Hisa is also staying with Jingoro, the man who hired Hisa's husband. Confessing to be low on cash, Ichi asks the proprietress if she can ask if anyone wishes for a massage so he can earn money to pay for the accommodation. Jingoro accepts so he can find out about Ichi. Ichi orders Mitsu not to leave their room. While giving the massage Hisa, whose presence Ichi detected, leaves the room. When asked if he is Zatoichi, Ichi denies this and says Zatoichi is a fool for having learned the sword as now people always want to kill him. Ichi senses the man going for his sword, he grabs it, wraps the sageo (cord around the sheath) around the handle so it can't be used and throws it across the room.and then gives a very hard massage for which he charges a huge amount. Meanwhile, Hisa has talked to Mitsu and convinced her of Ichi's ill intent. Hisa leaves with Mitsu.

At the palanquin service, Hisa's insistence on haste alerts Tomegoro, the owner, who decides there is money to be made by taking the girl himself and he orders his men to cast Hisa out. Ichi finds Hisa in the street and learns that Jingoro works for Boss Tobei Shimozuma. Claiming to be there to give a massage, Ichi goes to the travel boss and asks about Mitsu but they try to throw him out. After this failure and a show of swordsmanship they return Mitsu to him. Back at the inn Ichi chastises Mitsu and reveals his hurt feelings that she mistrusted him. She apologizes and flies into his arms.

The next day the group of samurai are on the road looking for the girl with orders to kill her from their lord which one of them questions. While eating lunch, Mitsu says she is happy for her hardships as without them, she never would have met Ichi. As she reaches to wipe food from his face, he violently grabs her hand and tells her to stay still and then dispatches the three samurai who charge at them. Arriving at the next town, Mitsu asks him to come with her so he can meet her family, and when he is reluctant she gets him to confess that if he doesn't leave her now, he will be unable to ever let her go which pleases her before he says he is joking. Even as she is sitting in her palanquin, she begs him to visit.

Sitting on a boat Ichi overhears that the two bosses are going to fight as Boss Hikozo has arrived home. Tomegoro goes to Doyama to see Hikozo and offers his alliance to Hikozo. Ichi arrives at Hikozo's house. Hikozo asks Ichi for help and Ichi demurs, claiming false pretences, and Hikozo eventually offers the huge sum of 20 gold ryo which Ichi accepts as below his usual 30 only because of who they will fight. The young man, Matsu, who serves Ichi sake reveals he loves a girl named Mitsu.

Hisa and Jingoro men waylay Mitsu on the road and take her to Boss Tobei. They plan to use her to control Ichi and turn the fight to their favor. Hikozo launches a dawn raid by boat and Shimozuma drags Mitsu out against Hisa's protests that taking a girl to a fight is wrong. Tobei lets Mitsu call out and orders Ichi out of the fight and he concedes, even to the point of returning his money and conferring with Tobei about killing the two bosses on the other side which is Tobei's main objective.

Ichi starts the fight and in the confusion manages to isolate Tobei with Hikozo and Tomegoro and he kills all three. Other men arrive and flee in panic when Ichi faces them. He returns to the main street and when confronted by Matsu tells him to leave. Mitsu is unharmed, apparently with Hisa's help, and flies into Ichi's arms again. Tobei's men arrive in force with Jingoro, whom Ichi says deserves to die, and threaten Ichi. He gives money to Matsu who ask him to take Mitsu to the ferry. As they leave he calls them back and almost returns to her her kerchief which she dropped before he sent here away the first time but he changes his mind. He then kills Jingoro and any man who approaches.

Waiting on the road Matsu realises Mitsu is the girl that Ichi talked about fondly and that by giving them money Ichi was signalling that he wouldn't be with them. Ichi is seen walking off alone again.

== Cast ==
- Shintaro Katsu as Ichi, The Blind Swordsman
- Shiho Fujimura as Mitsu
- Ryuzo Shimada as Jingoro
- Reiko Fujiwara as Hisa
- Matasaburo Niwa as Yamada
- Yoshio Yoshida as Boss Tomegoro of Kagotame
- Sonosuke Sawamura as Boss Hikozo of Doyama
- Yutaka Nakamura as Matsu

== Production ==
- Kimiyoshi Yasuda - Director
- Minoru Inuzuka - Writer
- Kan Shimosawa - Story
- Yoshinobu Nishioka - Art director
