= Kirigakure Saizō =

Japanese ninja

Kirigakure Saizō (霧隠才蔵) is a fictional ninja of the final phase of the Sengoku period of Japan. In the folklore he is one of the Sanada Ten Braves, and next to Sarutobi Sasuke, he is the most recognized of the Ten.

As in the case of Sasuke, Saizō might be a fictional creation of the Meiji-period popular literature, possibly based on Kirigakure Shikaemon. His family name, meaning "Hide in the fog", is written with two kanji; kiri (霧) is the character for "fog", and gakure (隠) is the character for "hide".

According to the historian Stephen Turnbull and non-fiction writer Joel Levy, there is a historical record of a failed assassination attempt by a ninja called Kirigakure Saizō, sent by the warlord Tokugawa Ieyasu to kill his rival Toyotomi Hideyoshi (Tokichiro Kinoshita). According to another version of this incident, presented by the martial artist and researcher Donn F. Draeger, the "careless ninja" Saizō was captured while only spying on Hideyoshi, which actually saved the life of the warlord because he was about to be killed by a double agent, Yusuke Takiguchi; Saizō's life was then spared on the condition of declaring loyalty to the Toyotomi clan.

Saizō is said to be a master of Iga ninjutsu. Sarutobi Sasuke, a Kōga ninja, is thus often portrayed as Saizō's arch-rival, and after they both converted to Sanada's cause, best friends and partners. The name Kirigakure literally means "Hidden Mist", as such Saizō is often associated with fog and, by extension, illusion magic. In contrast to Sasuke, who is often rendered with an almost feral child appearance, Saizō usually appears as a calm, elegant, mature, handsome and sometimes feminine young man. The martial artist and author Stephen K. Hayes compared the portrayal of Saizō in the Japanese children books to this of another ninja "romantic figure" of the bandit hero Ishikawa Goemon.

== In popular culture ==
After Sasuke, Saizō is the only other one of the Ten who is relatively often recurring in the modern works of fiction. In the manga and anime series Samurai Deeper Kyo, Saizo is a fanatical yet humorous loyalist of Sanada Yukimura. In the film Goemon, Kirigakure Saizō was portrayed by Takao Osawa (and Takeru Satoh in the role of young Saizō). He also appears in the film Kamen Rider Den-O: I'm Born! and the manga series BRAVE10, and is the subject of the fourth and the seventh films in the Shinobi no Mono series (Shinobi no Mono: Zoku Kirigakure Saizō and Shinobi No Mono: Shin Kirigakure Saizō), as well as a player character in the video game Onimusha Tactics; in Shall We Date?: Ninja Love, he is either a romance option or the player character. He also makes an appearance as one of the antagonist in the manga and anime series Mushibugyo.

There are also several more or less indirect connections. In the Super Sentai series Ninja Sentai Kakuranger, one of the main characters, Saizou, played by Hiroshi Tsuchida, is a modern descendant of Saizō. In a highly unusual portrayal in the video game Kessen, Saizo is one of a trio of Yukimura's female ninja bodyguards. The modern ninja named Saizo are also player characters in the video game series Power Instinct (Saizo Hattori) and Breakers Revenge (Tobikageno Saizō), while the title character in the manga and anime series Igano Kabamaru was raised and trained by his grandfather Saizō Igano. A village named Kirigakure ("Hidden in Mist") appears in the manga and anime series Naruto, with its first appearing mist character Momochi Zabuza using fog techniques befitting the lore.
