= Hayato Ichihara =

Japanese actor (born 1987)

- 市原 隼人
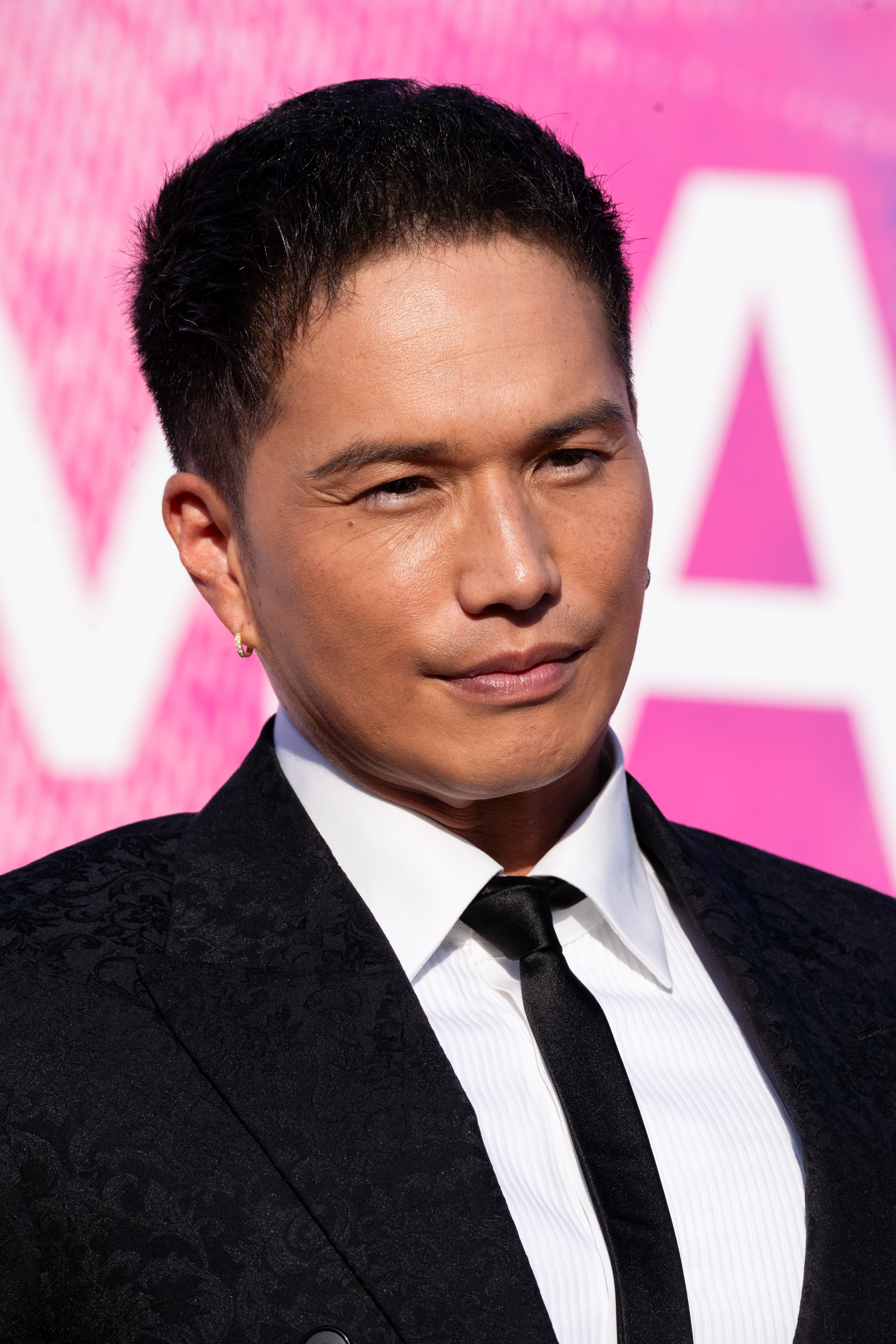
- Ichihara at the Yokohama International Film Festival in 2024
- Born: February 6, 1987 (age 39); Kawasaki, Kanagawa, Japan
- Occupation: Actor
- Years active: 1999–present
- Agent: Stardust Promotion
- Spouse: Shiho Mukōyama (m. 2014)
- Children: 1

Hayato Ichihara (市原 隼人, Ichihara Hayato; February 6, 1987) is a Japanese actor who is best known for his roles in film and television, including the 2001 film All About Lily Chou-Chou. He was voted in Oricon's "fresh star ranking" poll for the first half of 2009 as the 5th most impactful young male celebrity of the year. Shortly after, he was also voted in another Oricon poll as the 4th most attractive male celebrity in a swimsuit. In 2011, Ichihara was voted as being the actor with the 7th best abs in a poll by NTT DoCoMo.

== Personal life ==
Hayato Ichihara was born in Kawasaki City, Kanagawa Prefecture on February 6, 1987. He grew up in a strict household and is the youngest of five siblings.

On September 21, 2014, Ichihara married model Shiho Mukōyama after dating for two years. In November of the same year, their first child, a daughter, was born.

== Filmography ==
=== Films ===
- Ju-on: The Curse 2 (2000), Naoki
- All About Lily Chou-Chou Riri Shushu no subete (2001), Yuichi Hasumi
- Yomigaeri (2002), Katsunori Yamada
- Onmyoji 2 (2003), Susa
- Worst by Chance (2003), Hidenori Kaneshiro
- T.R.Y. (2003)
- The Angel's Egg (2006), Ayuta Ipponyari
- Rainbow Song (2006), Tomoya Kishida
- Check It Out, Yo! Chekeraccho!! (2006), Toru Isaka
- 700 Days of Battle: Us vs. the Police (2008)
- God's Puzzle (2008)
- Negative Happy Chain Saw Edge (2008), Yosuke Yamamoto
- Baton (2009), Apollo (voice)
- Rookies (2009)
- Box! (2010)
- Saru Lock The Movie (2010)
- Dog x Police: The K-9 Force (2011), Yusaku Hayakawa
- Yakuza Apocalypse (2015)
- Hoshigaoka Wonderland (2016)
- Hotel Copain (2016)
- Reverse (2017), Yasuo Tanihara
- Blade of the Immortal (2017), Shira
- The Blue Hearts (2017)
- Samurai Sensei (2018), Takechi Hanpeita
- Under One Umbrella (2018)
- Aircraft Carrier Ibuki (2019), Yōhei Sakomizu
- Color of Songs (2019)
- Katsu Fūtarō!! (2019), Fūtarō
- Three Nobunagas (2019), Oda Nobunaga
- School Meals Time: Final Battle (2020), Yukio Amarida
- The Sun Stands Still (2021), Ryūji Yamashita
- A Family (2021)
- Rika: Love Obsessed Psycho (2021)
- Tom and Sawyer in the City (2021)
- School Meals Time: Graduation (2022), Yukio Amarida
- Red Shoes (2023)
- School Meals Time: Road to Ikameshi (2024), Yukio Amarida
- School Meals Time: School Excursion Inferno (2025), Yukio Amarida
- The Honest Realtor: The Movie (2026), Takahisa Kiriyama
- School Meals Time: Umasoge Kingdom (2027), Yukio Amarida

=== Television series ===
- The Long Love Letter (2002)
- Vitamin F (2002)
- Hitonatsu no Papa e (2003)
- Drop-out Teacher Returns to School (2003)
- The Way I Live (2003)
- Water Boys 2 (2004)
- Waltz of Her Heart (2004)
- Charming (2005)
- Rookies (2008)
- Saru Lock (2009)
- Runaways: For Your Love (2011), Ataru Katsuragi
- Hidamari no Ki (2012)
- Karamazov no kyodai (2013), Isao Kuraosawa
- Fukigen na Kajitsu (2016), Michihiko Kudō
- Kimi ni sasageru Emblem (2017)
- Naotora: The Lady Warlord (2017), Ketsuzan
- Riba-su (2017), Tanihara
- Chinmoku Hōtei (2017)
- The Sun Stands Still: The Eclipse (2020), Ryūji Yamashita
- Isoroku Yamamoto in London (2021), Arata Oka
- The 13 Lords of the Shogun (2022), Hatta Tomoie
- The Honest Realtor (2022–24), Takahisa Kiriyama
- Trade War (2023)
- Unbound (2025), Toriyama Kengyō
- Pray Speak What Has Happened (2025), Tony Ando

== Book ==
- 2015 「G: Hayato Ichihara」
