= Gokenin Zankurō =

- Also known as: 御家人斬九郎
- Genre: Jidaigeki
- Directed by: Kōsei Saitō; Eiichi Kudo
- Starring: Ken Watanabe; Kyōko Kishida; Mayumi Wakamura
- Theme music composer: Masaru Sato
- Country of origin: Japan
- Original language: Japanese
- No. of series: 5
- No. of episodes: 50

Production
- Running time: 45 minutes (per episode)
- Production company: Kyoto Eiga

Original release
- Network: Fuji Television
- Release: 1997 – 2001

Gokenin Zankurō (御家人斬九郎) is a novel by Renzaburō Shibata. The protagonist of this jidaigeki is Matsudaira Zankurō, a low-ranking gokenin in the service of the Tokugawa shogunate. He lives with his mother Masajo in the shogunal capital of Edo. Other characters include his fiancée Matsudaira Sumi, old friend Nishio Denzaburō, and favorite geisha Otsuta.

From 1995 to 2002 Gokenin Zankurō was also a prime-time television series on the Fuji Television network in Japan. Ken Watanabe played the lead, with Kyōko Kishida as his mother and Mayumi Wakamura as the geisha (Tsutakichi in the series). Watanabe directed the final episode.
