= Minoru Inuzuka =

Japanese film director and screenwriter (1901–2007)

- Born: 15 February 1901; Tokyo, Japan
- Died: 17 September 2007 (aged 106)
- Occupations: Film director, screenwriter

Minoru Inuzuka (犬塚 稔, Inuzuka Minoru; 15 February 1901 – 17 September 2007) was a Japanese film director and screenwriter. Starting out as a screenwriter at Shochiku in 1924, he also participated in the production of Teinosuke Kinugasa's A Page of Madness. When Chōjirō Hayashi (later known as Kazuo Hasegawa) became a jidaigeki star at Shochiku, Inuzuka directed many of his films. After World War II, Inuzuka returned to specializing in screenplays and was known for his scripts for the Zatoichi series. He published his autobiography in 2002, and died in 2007 at the age of 106. When he died, he was called the last surviving director to have directed a silent film in the 1920s. Inuzuka wrote scripts for over 150 films and directed over 50.

== Selected filmography ==
=== As director ===
- Chigo no kenpō (稚児の剣法) (1927)
- The Spell of the Sand Painting (砂絵呪縛 Sunae Shibari) (1927)

=== As screenwriter ===
- A Page of Madness (狂った一頁 Kurutta Ichipeiji) (1926).
- Tsukigata Hanpeita: Hana no maki; Arashi no maki (月形半平太 花の巻 嵐の巻) (1956)
- Flowery Hood 2 (続花頭巾 Zoku Hana Zukin) (1956)
- The Tale of Zatoichi (座頭市物語 Zatōichi monogatari) (1962)
- New Tale of Zatoichi (新座頭市物語 Shin Zatōichi monogatari) (1963)
- Zatoichi on the Road (座頭市喧嘩旅 Zatōichi kenka-tabi) (1963)
