= Mayumi Wakamura =

Japanese actress (born 1967)

- Born: January 3, 1967 (age 59); Tokyo, Japan
- Occupation: Actress
- Years active: 1987–present

Mayumi Wakamura (若村麻由美 Wakamura Mayumi, born on January 3, 1967, in Nerima, Tokyo) is a Japanese actress. She decided to be an actress at age sixteen when she saw a stage production by Tatsuya Nakadai's troupe. Later she joined his stage production to be an actress. She debuted in the six-month Asadora TV series Hassai Sensei in 1987 (produced by NHK) when she was 21 years old. After the show, she started appearing on other TV shows including several TV movies and series. In 1988 she was cast in a drama Kigakaikyo.

In February, 2004, she married Kanehiro Ono, the leader of the religious group Shakusonkai (釈尊会). She appeared in another Asadora Jun to Ai in 2012.

== Filmography ==
=== Films ===
- Florence My Love (1991)
- Kozure Ōkami: Sono Chiisaki Te ni (1993)
- Spellbound (1999) - Wada
- Genghis Khan: To the Ends of the Earth and Sea (2007) - Hoelun
- God's Puzzle (2008) - Saraka's mother
- My Rainy Days (2009) - Ayako Ozawa
- Night People (2013)
- Hitotsubu no Mugi (2019) - Ogino Ginko
- Mio's Cookbook (2020)
- What Happened to Our Nest Egg!? (2021)
- The Woman of S.R.I. the Movie (2021) - Satsuki Kazaoka
- The Hotel of My Dream (2024)

=== Television ===
- Hassai Sensei (1987) - Midori Saotome
- Gokenin Zankurō (1995) - Tsutakichi
- The Great White Tower (2003) - Kyoko Zaizen
- Atsuhime (2008) - Kangyoin (Tsuneko Hashimoto)
- The Woman of S.R.I. (2008–20) - Satsuki Kazaoka
- Rebound (2011) - Ran Morinaka
- Jun to Ai (2012) - Taeko Machida
- Murder at Mt. Fuji (2012) - Yoshie Watsuji
- Hana Moyu (2015) - Mitsuru Mukunashi
- Shizumanu Taiyō (2016)
- Princess Jellyfish (2018) - Rina
- Half Blue Sky (2018)
- Ochoyan (2020–21) - Chidori Yamamura
- Shikatanakatta to Iute wa Ikan no desu (2021)
- Nakamura Nakazo: Shusse no Kizahashi (2021)
- Prism (2022)

=== Dubbing roles ===
- Calista Flockhart
  - Pictures of Baby Jane Doe (Jane)
  - Ally McBeal (Ally McBeal)
  - Things You Can Tell Just by Looking at Her (Christine Taylor)
- Bedtime Stories (Jill Hastings (Keri Russell))
- Janice Beard (Janice Beard (Eileen Walsh))

=== Video games ===
- Grandia III (Miranda)

== Awards ==
Year	Award	Category	Work(s)	Result
1989	13th Elan d'or Awards	Newcomer of the Year	Herself	Won
