= Kimiko Ikegami =

American-born Japanese actress (born 1959)

- 池上季実子
- Born: January 16, 1959 (age 67); New York City, U.S.
- Citizenship: Japanese
- Occupation: Actress
- Years active: 1975–present

Kimiko Ikegami (池上季実子, Ikegami Kimiko; born January 16, 1959) is an American-born Japanese actress. She is best known for playing the lead role of Gorgeous in the 1977 film House.

== Early life ==
Born in Manhattan, New York City, United States to Japanese parents, she moved to Kyoto at age 3. Kimiko graduated from Horikoshi High School in Nakano, Tokyo and subsequently attended Tamagawa University. She is closely related to the Bandō Mitsugorō kabuki actors: her grandfather was the eighth, her uncle the ninth (later Bandō Minosuke VII), her cousin (Bandō Yasosuke V) the tenth to take that name. With the encouragement of Yasosuke, Kimiko turned to acting.

== Career ==
She made her television debut in 1975 in the NHK show Maboroshi no Pen Friend, and in that year also appeared in Ai to Makoto on TV Tokyo. Her entry into film came in 1975, when she appeared in Hadashi no Seishun (Shochiku). In Taiga drama series, Kimiko portrayed Ōhime Kusa Moeru (1979) Chacha (later named Yodo-Dono) in the 1981 Onna Taikō-ki, Lady Tsukiyama (the wife of the title character) in Tokugawa Ieyasu (1983), and Eri (Lady Aburakawa, concubine of the title character) in Takeda Shingen. Other jidaigeki roles have included Sumi in the 1988 NHK Miyamoto Musashi Okon in Tōyama no Kin-san (1989), and Nami in the 2003 TV Tokyo Chūshingura: Ketsudan no Toki. Contemporary roles include the yakuza in Gokudō no Onna-tachi Revenge (the thirteenth in the series) and the female lead in Shiroi Kyotō (TV Asahi, 1990). She appears frequently as a guest star on television series such as Mito Kōmon.

Kimiko also recorded a song, Nagasarete, on the Victor Entertainment label. The 1984 release (as of 2006, out of print) was the theme song for the show Kiryūin Hanako no Shōgai.

Her honors include the 1990 Japan Jewellery Association Best Dresser Award.

== Filmography ==
=== Films ===
- House (1977) – Gorgeous
- Fuyu no hana (1978)
- Nichiren (1979)
- Taiyō o Nusunda Otoko (1979) – Zero Sawai
- The Geisha (1983)
- A Chaos of Flowers (1988)
- Edo Jō Tairan (1991)
- Kozure Ōkami: Sono Chiisaki Te ni (1993)
- Tea for Three (2024) – Hatsue

=== Television ===
- Fumō Chitai (1979) – Naoko Iki
- Kusa Moeru (1979) – Ōhime
- Onna Taikōki (1981) – Yodo-dono
- Tokugawa Ieyasu (1983) – Lady Tsukiyama
- Miyamoto Musashi (1984–85) – Akemi
- Tokugawa Ieyasu (1988) – Yodo-dono
