= Saburo Date =

Japanese actor (1924–1991)

- Born: Shuntaro Sakura; 27 March 1924; Taishō-ku, Osaka, Japan
- Died: 12 September 1991 (aged 67)
- Occupation: Actor
- Years active: 1947–1990

Saburo Date (伊達三郎, Date Saburō; 27 March 1924 – 12 September 1991) was a Japanese actor. In 1945, he signed a contract with Daiei Film company and started his acting career. Following year, he made his film debut with Okagura Kyōdai directed by Hiroshi Inagaki. At the same time, he was given the stage name Saburo Date by Inagaki. As the Daiei studio gave up film production in 1970, he left Daiei and became a freelance actor. He appeared in nearly 200 films between 1947 and 1990.

== Selected filmography ==
- Okagura Kyōdai (1946)
- Story of a Beloved Wife (1951)
- Avalanche (1952)
- Ugetsu (1953)
- Gate of Hell (1953)
- Sansho the Bailiff (1954)
- The Crucified Lovers (1954)
- Enjō (1958)
- The Loyal 47 Ronin (1958)
- Tsukihime keizu (1958)
- Nichiren: A Man of Many Miracles (1958)
- The Tale of Zatoichi Continues (1962)
- Enter Kyōshirō Nemuri the Swordman (1963) as Zeniya
- Daimajin (1966)
- A Certain Killer (1967)
- Yokai Monsters: Along with Ghosts (1969)
- Hitokiri (1969)
- Lone Wolf and Cub: Sword of Vengeance (1972)
- Female Prisoner 701: Scorpion (1972)
- Lone Wolf and Cub: Baby Cart to Hades (1972)
- Karate Kiba (1973)
- Graveyard of Honor (1975)
- The Bullet Train (1975)
- Typhoon club (1985)
- Childhood Days (1990)
