= Nemuri Kyōshirō =

Series of novels by Renzaburō Shibata

Nemuri Kyōshirō (眠 狂四郎, Nemuri Kyōshirō) is a series of jidaigeki novels written by Renzaburō Shibata. The stories were originally serialized beginning in May 1956 in the Shūkan Shinchō.

The stories take place during the Edo period under the Tokugawa shogunate and the rules of Tokugawa Ienari and his successor Tokugawa Ieyoshi. They center on the title character, a sleepy-eyed rōnin, or masterless swordsman, who is the son of a Japanese mother (the daughter of a daimyō, who commits jigaki (see "Female Ritual Suicide" in Seppuku) some time after Kyoshiro's birth) and a foreign father, and who was conceived during a Black Mass (resulting in his fierce hatred for what he considers the hypocrisy of Christianity).

== Novels ==
Seven full-length novels and eight short stories in the Nemuri Kyoshirō series were published in Japan.

=== Full-length novels ===
Nemuri Kyoshiro: Record of an Outlaw, The Complete Six-Volume Series
- Nemuri Kyōshirō: Burai-hikae, Zenrokukan (眠狂四郎 無頼控 全6巻)

1. Nemuri Kyoshiro: Walking Alone, Parts One and Two
  - Nemuri Kyōshirō: Hitohokō, Jōgekan (眠狂四郎 独歩行 上下巻)
2. Nemuri Kyoshiro: Calligraphy Copybook for a Killer, Parts One and Two
  - Nemuri Kyōshirō: Satsu-hōjō, Jōgekan (眠狂四郎 殺法帖 上下巻)
3. Nemuri Kyoshiro: The 53 Stations of the Orphaned Blade, Parts One and Two
  - Nemuri Kyōshirō: Koken Gojūsan-tsugi, Jōgekan (眠狂四郎 孤剣五十三次 上下巻)
4. Nemuri Kyoshiro: The Empty Journal, Parts One and Two
  - Nemuri Kyōshirō: Kyomu-nisshi, Jōgekan (眠狂四郎 虚無日誌 上下巻)
5. Nemuri Kyoshiro: Record of an Outlaw, Parts One and Two
  - Nemuri Kyōshirō: Burai-hikae, Jōgekan (眠狂四郎 無情控 上下巻)
6. Nemuri Kyoshiro: Heretical Writings
  - Nemuri Kyōshirō: Itan-jō (眠狂四郎 異端状)

=== Short stories ===
The False Avenger: Nemuri Kyoshiro Urban Legend
- Nisemono Sukedachi: Nemuri Kyōshirō Ichītan no Uchi (贋者助太刀－眠狂四郎市井譚の内－)
Kind and Courteous Chronicles: Nemuri Kyoshiro Urban Legend
- Giri Ninjō-ki: Nemuri Kyōshirō Ichītan no Uchi (義理人情記－眠狂四郎市井譚の内－)
Nemuri Kyoshiro: Kyoto Duel Book
- Nemuri Kyōshirō: Kyōraku Shōbu-jō (眠狂四郎 京洛勝負帖)
The Dangerous Vanishing Weapon
- Kieta Kyōki (消えた兇器)
The Bride's Neck
- Hanayome-kubi (花嫁首)
Wicked Woman's Revenge
- Akujo Adauchi (悪女仇討)
The Fox, the Monk, and the Ronin
- Kitsune to Sō to Rōnin (狐と僧と浪人)
Spy Gizmo
- Nozoki Karakuri (のぞきからくり)
New Compilation, Nemuri Kyoshiro: Kyoto Duel Book (collects short stories and essays)
- Shin-hen Nemuri Kyōshirō: Kyōraku Shōbu-jō (新篇 眠狂四郎 京洛勝負帖)

== Adaptations ==
=== Tsuruta Kōji series (1956–1958) ===
"Nemuri Kyoshiro" was first played by Kōji Tsuruta in three films released by Toho:

1. Nemuri Kyōshirō Burai Hikae (Journal of an Outlaw) (1956)
2. Nemuri Kyōshirō Burai Hikae Dainibu (Journal of an Outlaw Pt. 2 - Full Moon Cut) (1957)
3. Nemuri Kyōshirō Burai Hikae: Maken Jigoku (The Spell of the Hidden Gold) (1958)

=== Ichikawa Raizo series (1963–1969) ===
From 1963 to 1969, Ichikawa Raizo played "Nemuri Kyoshiro" in the series by Daiei Film. Animeigo released the first six films of the Daiei series on VHS and the first five on laserdisc under the title of Sleepy Eyes of Death. Animeigo later announced that it had renewed their licensing rights to the series and released a boxed set of the first four films on DVD in 2009. A second boxed set containing the next four films was released in summer 2010 (which marked the first official release on DVD in the United States of The Mask of the Princess and Sword of Villainy ). The third boxed set came out in 2013.

==== Sleepy Eyes of Death 1: The Chinese Jade (1963) ====
- Nemuri Kyōshirō Sappōchō (Enter Kyōshirō Nemuri the Swordman) Nemuri Kyōshirō Sappōchō Directed by Tokuzō Tanaka

Starring, Tamao Nakamura, Tomisaburo Wakayama, Katsuhiko Kobayashi

==== Sleepy Eyes of Death 2: Sword of Adventure (1964) ====
- Nemuri Kyōshirō Shōbu (Adventures of Kyōshirō Nemuri) Directed by Kenji Misumi

Starring, Shiho Fujimura, Miwa Takada, Yoshi Katō

==== Sleepy Eyes of Death 3: Full Circle Killing (1964) ====
- Nemuri Kyōshirō Engetsugiri (Exploits of Kyōshirō Nemuri) Directed by Kimiyoshi Yasuda

Starring, Yuko Hamada, Taro Marui

==== Sleepy Eyes of Death 4: Sword of Seduction (1964) ====
- Nemuri Kyōshirō: Joyoken (Kyoshiro Nemuri at Bay) Directed by Kazuo Ikehiro

Starring, Shiho Fujimura, Masumi Harukawa, Tomisaburo Wakayama

==== Sleepy Eyes of Death 5: Sword of Fire (1965) ====
- Nemuri Kyōshirō: Enjo-ken (The Swordsman and the Pirate) Directed by Kenji Misumi

Starring, Tamao Nakamura, Michiko Sugata, Kō Nishimura

==== Sleepy Eyes of Death 6: Sword of Satan (1965) ====
- Nemuri Kyōshirō: Masho-ken (The Mysterious Sword of Kyoshiro) Directed by Kimiyoshi Yasuda

Starring, Michiko Saga, Fujio Suga, Machiko Hasegawa, Yoshio Inaba

==== Sleepy Eyes of Death: The Mask of the Princess (1966) ====
- Nemuri Kyōshirō: Tajo-ken (The Mask of the Princess) Directed by Akira Inoue

Starring, Yaeko Mizutani, Ichirō Nakatani, Ryutaro Gomi

==== Sleepy Eyes of Death 8: Sword of Villainy (1966) ====
- Nemuri Kyōshirō: Burai-ken (The Sword That Saved Edo) Directed by Kenji Misumi

Starring, Shigeru Amachi, Shiho Fujimura, Tatsuo Endo

==== Sleepy Eyes of Death 9: A Trail of Traps (1967) ====
- Nemuri Kyōshirō: Burai-Hikae masho no hada (The Trail of Traps) Directed by Kazuo Ikehiro

Starring, Mikio Narita, Nobuo Kaneko, Haruko Mabuchi

==== Sleepy Eyes of Death 10: Hell Is a Woman (1968) ====
- Nemuri Kyōshirō: Onna jigoku (The Ronin Called Nemuri) Directed by Tokuzō Tanaka

Starring, Miwa Takada, Takahiro Tamura, Yūnosuke Itō, Eitaro Ozawa

==== Sleepy Eyes of Death 11: In the Spider's Lair (1968) ====
- Nemuri Kyōshirō: Hito hada kumo (The Human Tarantula) Directed by Kimiyoshi Yasuda

Starring, Mako Midori, Yūsuke Kawazu, Fumio Watanabe, Minori Terada

==== Sleepy Eyes of Death 12: Castle Menagerie (1969) ====
- Nemuri Kyōshirō: Akujo-gari (Castle Menagerie) Directed by Kazuo Ikehiro

Starring, Shiho Fujimura, Kayo Matsuo, Shinjirō Ehara

=== Matsukata Hiroki series (1969) ===
After Ichikawa's death, the role of "Nemuri Kyoshiro" was then played by Matsukata Hiroki in two more Daiei films:

1. Nemuri Kyōshirō: Engetsu Sappo (1969) (The Full Moon Swordsman) Directed by Kazuo Mori
2. Nemuri Kyōshirō Manji Giri (1969) (Fylfot Swordplay) Directed by Kazuo Ikehiro

=== Tamura Masakazu series ===
The role of "Nemuri Kyoshiro" was then played by Masakazu Tamura in a Fuji TV series and later in five made-for-TV movie specials. Tamura also played the role on the stage in 1973 and 1981.

1. Nemuri Kyōshirō (1972–1973) a Kansai – Toei production, 26 episodes
2. Nemuri Kyōshirō (1989) Directed by Tokuzō Tanaka
3. Nemuri Kyōshirō 2: Conspiracy in Edo Castle (1993) Directed by Akira Inoue
4. Nemuri Kyōshirō 3: The Man of No Tomorrow (1996) Directed by Sadao Nakajima
5. 'Nemuri Kyōshirō 4: The Woman Who Loved Kyoshiro (1998) Directed by Akira Inoue
6. Nemuri Kyōshirō: The Final (2018) Directed by Tomohiko Yamashita

==== On the stage ====
1. Nemuri Kyōshirō Buraihikae (1973)
2. Nemuri Kyōshirō (1973)
3. Nemuri Kyōshirō Curuz no Hahano Komoriuta (1981)

=== Kataoka Takao series (1982–1983) ===
The role of "Nemuri Kyoshiro" was then played by Kataoka Takao in two series of 50-minute episodes for TV Tokyo. The plotline of the first series takes place during the Tokugawa Ieyoshi shogunate with the Satsuma clan leading a conspiracy with 13 Western clans against the policies of Council Leader Mizuno Tadakuni; when Satsuma clansmen, believing him to be working for Mizuno, murder his friends, Kyoshiro (who despises both the shogunate and the conspirators as equally corrupt) is unwillingly caught up in events and travels to Kyoto to face the leaders of the conspiracy, followed by and assisted upon occasion by O-ran (Kayo Matsuo), a female agent of Mizuno's, and Kinpachi (Shōhei Hino), a ne'er-do-well and occasional pickpocket who's over-fond of gambling and women but with certain unusual skills.

A second series, also starring Kataoka Takao, was broadcast in 1983; this series did not have an underlying plot but consisted of individual stories taking place after Kyoshiro has returned to Edo, using the Funasen boat-inn as a temporary residence.

1. Nemuri Kyōshirō: Engetsu Sappô (1982) (Nemuri Kyoshiro: Full Moon Swordsman) – 20 episodes
2. Nemuri Kyōshirō Burai refrain (1983) (Nemuri Kyoshiro: Son of the Black Mass) – 22 episodes

=== Other adaptations ===
1. Nemuri Kyōshirō Burai refrain (1957) a Nippon Television production, starring Wataru Emi (Shuntaro Emi)
2. Nemuri Kyōshirō (1961) a Japan TV production, starring Wataru Emi (Shuntaro Emi)
3. Nemuri Kyōshirō (1967) a Fuji TV production, starring Mikijirō Hira
4. Nemuri Kyōshirō (2026) a NHK TV movie, starring Hiroki Hasegawa

=== Manga ===
A manga version of Nemuri Kyoshiro by Yoshihiro Yanagawa was serialized in the Weekly Comic Bunch from the magazine's premier issue in 2001 to issue 43 of 2003. It was collected in ten tankōbon editions under the Bunch Comics imprint. Portions of the series were translated in the short lived English anthology Raijin Comics.

=== Nemuri X Gackt project ===
In late 2009 it was announced that Japanese singer-songwriter and actor Gackt would lend his image to a new Nemuri Kyoshiro project, starring as the eponymous protagonist, beginning with jidaigeki theatre stage play in May 2010, penned by Kundō Koyama. The play Nemuri Kyoshiro Buraihikae started on 14 May 2010 at Nissay Theatre. The show ran for 120 performances in seven cities until February 27, 2011, with an estimated 150,000 spectators. Its music director and score composer was Sugizo. The original soundtrack was released on 14 May 2010 by Gordie Entertainment, while play's DVD recording in February 2011.

== Legacy ==
- Isao Takahata said the warrior outfits in Pom Poko were inspired by Nemuri Kyoshiro.
- The Blade anime has the character mimicking Nemuri Kyoshiro's sword technique at one point.
- The titular character in the 2011 anime adaptation of Dororon Enma-kun also pulls off the move in episode 12.
- The character named Kyoshiro in the manga "One piece" is named after Nemuri Kyoshiro.
