= Renzaburō Shibata =

Japanese writer (1917–1978)

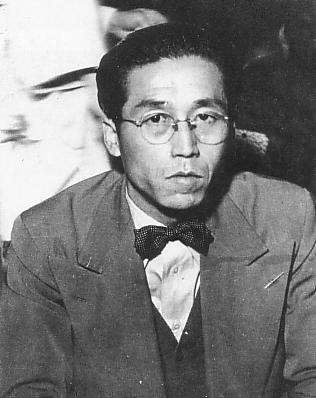

Renzaburō Shibata (柴田錬三郎, Shibata Renzaburō; March 26, 1917 – June 30, 1978) was a Japanese author and Sinologist.

He graduated from Keio University and won the Naoki Prize in 1951 for Iesu no Ei (lit. Descendant of Jesus).

He is famous for Nemuri Kyōshirō, a series of jidaigeki novels. He also published a new Japanese translation of Romance of the Three Kingdoms and Water Margin.

== Novels ==
- Nemuri Kyōshirō (1956)
- Gokenin Zankurō (1976)
- Romance of the Three Kingdoms (1959)
- Water Margin
- Unmeitōge
- Iesu no Ei (lit. Descendant of Jesus)

== Adaptations ==
=== Film ===
- Destiny's Son (1962)
- Enter Kyōshirō Nemuri the Swordman (1963)
- Curse of the Blood (1968)
- Nemuri Kyōshirō manji giri (1969)
