= List of Japanese films of 1972 =

A list of films released in Japan in 1972 (see 1972 in film).

Japanese films released in 1972
Title	Japanese	Director	Cast	Genre	Notes
Aozameta Nichiyobi		Shiro Moritani	Ruriko Asaoka, Go Wakabayashi, Akira Yamauchi	—	
Bara no hyoteki		Kiyoshi Nishimura	Yūzō Kayama, Cheng Chong, Eiji Okada	—	
Beads From a Petal		Noboru Tanaka	Rie Nakagawa	—	
Eternal Cause		Tadashi Imai	Takeo Chii, Mayumi Ogawa, Katsuhiko Sasaki	—	
The Fearless Avenger		Kazuo Ikehiro	Yoshio Harada, Atsuo Nakamura, Ryoko Nakano	—	
Female Prisoner #701: Scorpion		Shunya Itō	Meiko Kaji, Isao Natsuyagi, Fumio Watanabe	—	
Female Convict Scorpion: Jailhouse 41		Shunya Itō	Meiko Kaji, Fumio Watanabe	—	
Girl Boss Guerilla		Norifumi Suzuki	Miki Sugimoto, Reiko Ike	Pinky Violent	
Godzilla vs. Gigan		Jun Fukuda	Hiroshi Ishikawa, Tomoko Umeda, Zan Fujita	—	
Hajimete no ai		Shiro Moritani	Yusuke Okada, Yoko Shimada, Daisuke Katō	—	
Hanzo the Razor: Sword of Justice		Kenji Misumi	Shintaro Katsu, Yukiji Asaoka, Mari Atsumi	Action	
Heapin sakasu		Kiyoshi Nishimura	Kiyoshi Misaki, Yuko Enatsu, Kimiko Kasai	—	
Hyakumannin no daigasho		Eizo Sugawa	Go Wakabayashi, Wakako Sakai, Shiro Osaka	—	
Ichijo's Wet Lust		Tatsumi Kumashiro	Sayuri Ichijō, Hiroko Isayama, Kazuko Shirakawa	—	
Kaette kita Urutoraman–Jiro-kun kaiju ni noru		Eizo Yamagiwa	Jiro Dan, Jun Neagari, Shunsuke Ikeda	—	
Kaiju funsen–Daigoro tai Goriasu		Toshiro Iijima	Hiroshi Inuzuka, Shinsuke Minami, Hachiro Misumi	—	
Kamen Raidâ tai Shokkâ		Minoru Yamada	Hiroshi Fujioka, Takeshi Sasaki	—	
Kamen Raidā Tai Jigoku-taishi		Minoru Yamada	Hiroshi Fujioka	—	
Kashinoki Mokku		Ippei Kuri	—	—	Animated short film
Kashinoki Mokku–Boku wa nakanai		Ippei Kuri	—	—	Animated short film
Kigeki–Dorobokazoku–Tenka o toru		Takashi Tsuboshima	Hitoshi Ueki, Eiko Minami, Kei Tani	—	
Koi no natsu–L'été des amours		Hideo Onchi	Yōko Nogiwa, Tomoko Ogawa, Kei Yamamoto	—	
Kokosei burai hikae		Mio Ezaki	Masaya Oki, Junko Natsu, Eiko Yanami	—	
Konchyu monogatari–Minashigo Hattachi–Mama ni dakarete		Seitaro Hara	—	—	Animated short film
Konketsuji Rika		Ko Nakahira	Rika Aoki, Kazuko Nagamoto, Masami Muheta	Action	
Lone Wolf and Cub: Baby Cart in Peril		Buichi Saito	Tomisaburo Wakayama, Yoichi Hayashi, Michie Azuma	—	
Lone Wolf and Cub: Sword of Vengeance		Kenji Misumi	Tomisaburo Wakayama, Akihiro Tomikawa, Fumio Watanabe	Chambara	
Lone Wolf and Cub: Baby Cart at the River Styx		Kenji Misumi	Tomisaburo Wakayama, Kayo Matuso, Akiji Kobayashi	—	
Lone Wolf and Cub: Baby Cart to Hades		Kenji Misumi	Tomisaburo Wakayama, Go Kato, Yuko Hama	—	
Love Hunter		Seiichirō Yamaguchi	Hidemi Hara, Mari Tanaka	—	
Lusty Sisters		Chūsei Sone	Keiko Tsuzuki, Akemi Nijō	—	
Miraaman		Ishirō Honda	Nobuyuki Ishida, Junya Usami, Takako Sawai	—	
Panada • kopanda		Isao Takahata		—	Animated film
Naked Seven		Yasuharu Hasebe	Mari Tanaka	—	
Nippon sanjushi–Osaraba Tokyo no maki		Kihachi Okamoto	Keiju Kobayashi, Yusuke Okada, Mickey Yasukawa	—	
The Rendezvous		Kōichi Saitō	—	—	
Return of the Soldier		Yasuzo Masumura	Shintaro Katsu, Takahiro Tamura, Michiyo Yasuda	—	
Seifuku no mune no kokoniwa		Kunihiko Watanabe	Hiroshi Ishikawa, Keiko Torii, Izumi Ayukawa	—	
The Long Darkness	忍ぶ川	Kei Kumai	Komaki Kurihara, Go Kato, Yasushi Nagata	Drama	
Shin heitai yakuza: Kasen					
So no hito wa hono no yoni		Nasanobu Deme	Shima Iwashita, Yusuke Okada, Ichiro Araki	—	
Street Mobster		Kinji Fukasaku	Bunta Sugawara, Noboru Ando	—	
Tabi no Omosa		Kōichi Saitō	Kumiko Akiyoshi		
Tenno Kogo Ryoheika		Hisatake Yasuho		Documentary	
Tensai Baka-bon		Hiroshi Saito	Megumi Hayashibara	—	Animated short film
Tensai Baka-bon–Wakare wa tsukai mononanoda		Hiroshi Saito	—	—	Animated short film
Tora-san's Dear Old Home		Yoji Yamada	Kiyoshi Atsumi	Comedy	
Tora-san's Dream-Come-True		Yoji Yamada	Kiyoshi Atsumi	Comedy	
Under the Flag of the Rising Sun	軍旗はためく下に	Kinji Fukasaku	Sachiko Hidari, Tetsuro Tamba, Kanemon Nakamura	Drama	
Yukemuri 110-ban–Iruka no daisho		Kazuo Inoue	Hisaya Morishige, Junzaburo Ban, Keiko Sekine	—	
Zatoichi at Large		Issei Mori	Shintaro Katsu, Hisaya Morishige, Naoko Otani	—	
Zatoichi in Desperation		Shintaro Katsu	Shintaro Katsu, Kiwako Taichi, Kyoko Yoshizawa	—	
Wolfman vs. Baragon	狼男 対 地底怪獣	Shizuo Nakajima ^{[1]}	N/A	Kaiju-short	Unreleased Fan film

== See also ==
- 1972 in Japan
- 1972 in Japanese television
