= Amemiya =

Amemiya (written: 雨宮) is a Japanese surname. Notable people with the surname include:

- Chris Amemiya, American geneticist
- Corinne Kaoru Amemiya Watanabe (born 1950), American judge
- Goroku Amemiya (雨宮 五六; 1886–1972), Japanese photographer
- Kazumi Amemiya (雨宮 かずみ; born 1964), Japanese voice actress
- Keita Amemiya (雨宮 慶太; born 1959), Japanese anime director and character designer
- Takeshi Amemiya (雨宮 健; 1935–2026), Japanese economist and academic
- Yosuke Amemiya (雨宮 庸介; born 1975), Japanese artist

== See also ==
- RE Amemiya, a Japanese automotive tuning company
- Sora Amamiya (雨宮 天; born 1993), Japanese actress
