= New Lone Wolf and Cub =

Japanese manga series

- First tankōbon volume cover

新・子連れ狼 (Shin Kozure Ōkami)
- Genre: Adventure; Historical; Samurai
- Manga
- Written by: Kazuo Koike
- Illustrated by: Hideki Mori
- Published by: Shogakukan
- English publisher: NA: Dark Horse Comics
- Magazine: Weekly Post
- Original run: November 10, 2003 – December 18, 2006
- Volumes: 11
- Manga

Soshite Kozure Ōkami: Shikaku no Ko
- Written by: Kazuo Koike
- Illustrated by: Hideki Mori
- Published by: Koike Shoin; eBookJapan (digital publication)
- Magazine: Jin (2007–2008); Katana (2009–2010)
- Original run: January 20, 2007 – July 20, 2010
- Volumes: 5
- icon

New Lone Wolf and Cub (Japanese: 新・子連れ狼, Hepburn: Shin Kozure Ōkami) is a Japanese manga series written by Kazuo Koike and illustrated by Hideki Mori. It is a sequel to Koike's manga series Lone Wolf and Cub. It was serialized in Shogakukan's Weekly Post from November 2003 to December 2006, with its chapters collected in 11 tankōbon volumes. It was licensed in North America by Dark Horse Comics. A sequel series, titled Soshite Kozure Ōkami: Shikaku no Ko, was published in Koike Shoin's Jin (2007–2008) and eBookJapan's digital manga magazine Katana (2009–2010), with its chapters collected in five volumes.

== Plot ==
In this series, which picks up immediately after the climactic battle of the original series, the bodies of Ogami Itto and Yagyu Retsudo are left lying on the battlefield with Daigoro left alone standing over his father's body (since no one, for political reasons, dares to bury either body or take charge of Daigoro). A bearded samurai, Tōgō Shigetada of the Satsuma clan and master of the Jigen-ryū style of swordsmanship (based on the actual historical personage Tōgō Shigetaka, creator of Jigen-ryū), wanders onto the battlefield and assists Daigoro with the cremation/funeral of Ogami Itto and Yagyu Retsudo. Tōgō, who is on a training journey and also carries a dotanuki sword similar to Ogami's (and crafted by the same swordsmith), then assumes guardianship of Daigoro, including retrieving the baby cart and teaching/training Daigoro in Jigen-ryū.

The two soon become enmeshed in a plot by the Shogunate conceived by the ruthless Matsudaira Nobutsuna and spearheaded by his chief henchman Mamiya Rinzō (also based on an actual historical character) to topple the Satsuma clan and assume control of that fiefdom's great wealth, using Tōgō as an unwitting pawn. When Tōgō discovers that he has been tricked and used, he and Daigoro embark on the road of meifumado in a quest to kill the Shogun (which would force Matsudaira out into the open). However, Rinzō, who is not only a master of disguise but also Matsudaira's natural son, may have an even more devious plan of his own, including subverting the Shogun's own ninja and using opium to ensnare and enslave the Shogun himself.

== Publication ==
Written by Kazuo Koike and illustrated by Hideki Mori, New Lone Wolf and Cub was serialized in Shogakukan's Weekly Post from November 10, 2003, to December 18, 2006. Shogakukan collected its chapters in eleven tankōbon volumes, released from September 30, 2004, to June 29, 2007. In North America, the manga was licensed by Dark Horse Comics. The eleven volumes were released from June 4, 2014, to December 14, 2016.

=== Sequel series ===
A sequel series, titled Soshite Kozure Ōkami: Shikaku no Ko (そして――子連れ狼 刺客の子; lit. 'More Lone Wolf and Cub: Eyes of the Child'), picking up after the climax of this series, was serialized in Koike Shoin's manga magazine Jin from January 20, 2007, until the magazine's last issue, released on May 21, 2008. The series resumed on eBookJapan's online manga magazine Katana on April 14, 2009, and finished on July 20, 2010. Five volumes were released by Koike Shoin from July 27, 2007, to September 28, 2012.
