= 1972 in Japan =

- Decades: 1950s; 1960s; 1970s; 1980s; 1990s
- See also: Other events of 1972; History of Japan; Timeline; Years

Events in the year 1972 in Japan. It corresponds to Shōwa 47 (昭和47年) in the Japanese calendar.

== Incumbents ==
- Emperor: Hirohito
- Prime minister: Eisaku Satō (Liberal Democratic) until July 7, Kakuei Tanaka (Liberal Democratic)
- Chief Cabinet Secretary: Noboru Takeshita until July 7, Susumu Nikaido
- Chief Justice of the Supreme Court: Kazuto Ishida
- President of the House of Representatives: Naka Funada until November 13, Umekichi Nakamura from December 22
- President of the House of Councillors: Kenzō Kōno

=== Governors ===
- Aichi Prefecture: Mikine Kuwahara
- Akita Prefecture: Yūjirō Obata
- Aomori Prefecture: Shunkichi Takeuchi
- Chiba Prefecture: Taketo Tomonō
- Ehime Prefecture: Haruki Shiraishi
- Fukui Prefecture: Heidayū Nakagawa
- Fukuoka Prefecture: Hikaru Kamei
- Fukushima Prefecture: Morie Kimura
- Gifu Prefecture: Saburō Hirano
- Gunma Prefecture: Konroku Kanda
- Hiroshima Prefecture: Iduo Nagano
- Hokkaido: Naohiro Dōgakinai
- Hyogo Prefecture: Tokitada Sakai
- Ibaraki Prefecture: Nirō Iwakami
- Ishikawa Prefecture: Yōichi Nakanishi
- Iwate Prefecture: Tadashi Chida
- Kagawa Prefecture: Masanori Kaneko
- Kagoshima Prefecture: Saburō Kanemaru
- Kanagawa Prefecture: Bunwa Tsuda
- Kochi Prefecture: Masumi Mizobuchi
- Kumamoto Prefecture: Issei Sawada
- Kyoto Prefecture: Torazō Ninagawa
- Mie Prefecture: Satoru Tanaka (until 7 November); Ryōzō Tagawa (starting 24 December)
- Miyagi Prefecture: Sōichirō Yamamoto
- Miyazaki Prefecture: Hiroshi Kuroki
- Nagano Prefecture: Gon'ichirō Nishizawa
- Nagasaki Prefecture: Kan'ichi Kubo
- Nara Prefecture: Ryozo Okuda
- Niigata Prefecture: Shiro Watari
- Oita Prefecture: Masaru Taki
- Okayama Prefecture: Takenori Kato (until 11 November); Shiro Nagano (starting 12 November)
- Okinawa Prefecture: Chōbyō Yara (starting 15 May)
- Osaka Prefecture: Ryōichi Kuroda
- Saga Prefecture: Sunao Ikeda
- Saitama Prefecture: Hiroshi Kurihara (until 12 July); Yawara Hata (starting 13 July)
- Shiga Prefecture: Kinichiro Nozaki
- Shiname Prefecture: Seiji Tsunematsu
- Shizuoka Prefecture: Yūtarō Takeyama
- Tochigi Prefecture: Nobuo Yokokawa
- Tokushima Prefecture: Yasunobu Takeichi
- Tokyo: Ryōkichi Minobe
- Tottori Prefecture: Jirō Ishiba
- Toyama Prefecture: Kokichi Nakada
- Wakayama Prefecture: Masao Ohashi
- Yamagata Prefecture: Tōkichi Abiko
- Yamaguchi Prefecture: Masayuki Hashimoto
- Yamanashi Prefecture: Kunio Tanabe

== Events ==
- January 24 – Two hunters discover Yokoi Shōichi, a former lieutenant in the Imperial Japanese Army who lived in a cave in Guam for 28 years after the end of World War II. Upon his return to Japan on February 2, he proclaimed, "it is with much shame that I return."
- February 3–13 – The 1972 Winter Olympics are held in Sapporo, Hokkaido.
- February 19–28 – Asama-Sanso incident occurs in Karuizawa, Nagano Prefecture.
- May 12 – Industrial robot brand, Fanuc was founded in Yamanashi Prefecture.
- May 13 – A fire at the Sennichi Department Store in Osaka kills 118, injures 78.
- May 15 – Okinawa returned to Japan after being occupied by the United States military for 27 years.
- July 3 to 13 – A heavy torrential rain with debris flow hit Kyushu and Shikoku area, according to Fire and Disaster Management official confirmed report, 447 people were killed, while another 1056 person were injured.
- July 5 – Kakuei Tanaka replaces Eisaku Satō as Prime Minister.
- July 21 – MOS Burger was founded.
- November 6 – An express passenger train caught fire in Hokuriku Rail Tunnel in Tsuruga, Fukui Prefecture, according to Japan Transport Ministry official confirmed report, 31 people died, and 714 people were injured.
- December 10 – General election of 1972 – Liberal Democratic Party win 271 out of 491 seats.

== Births ==
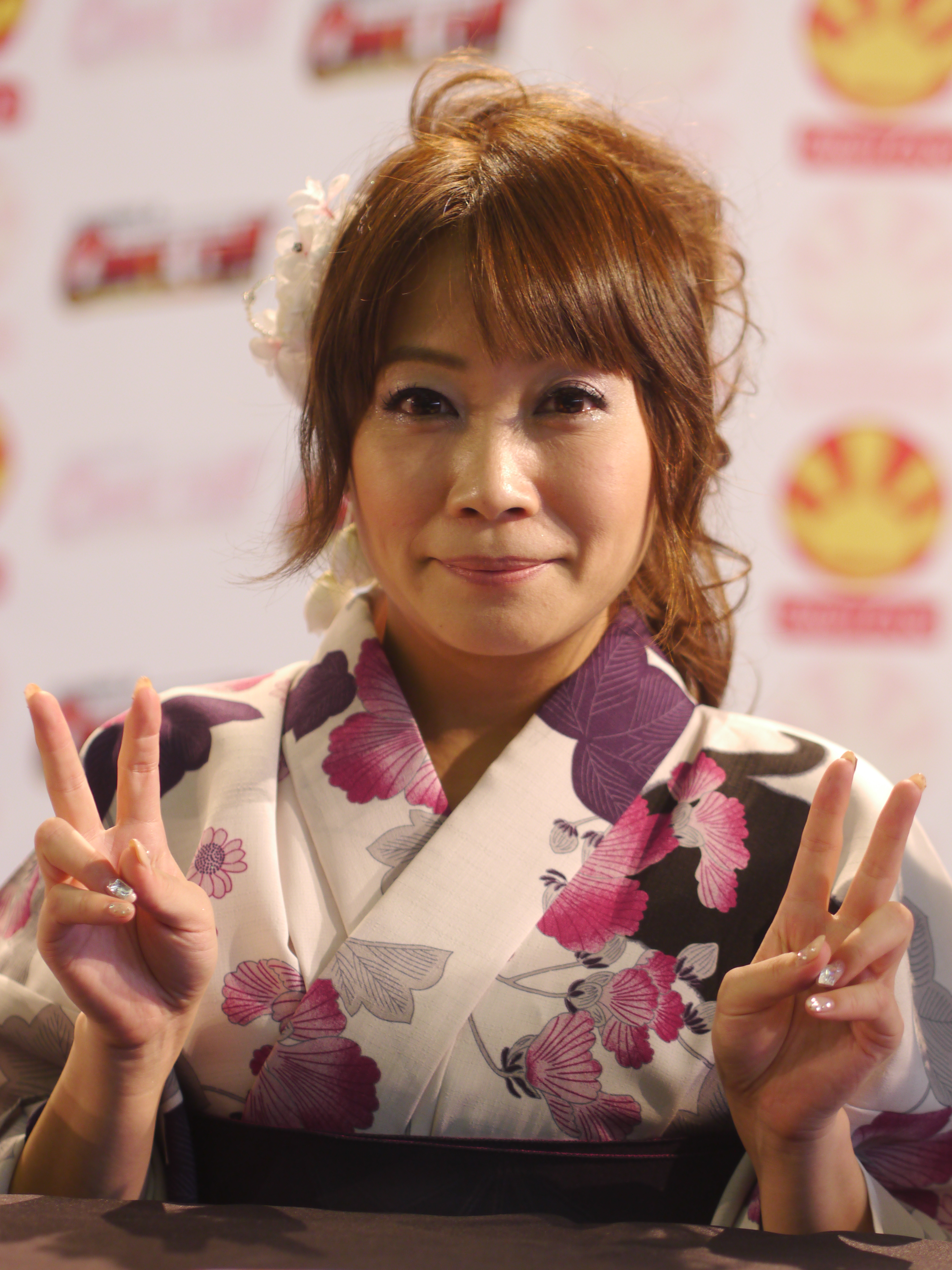
Junko Takeuchi

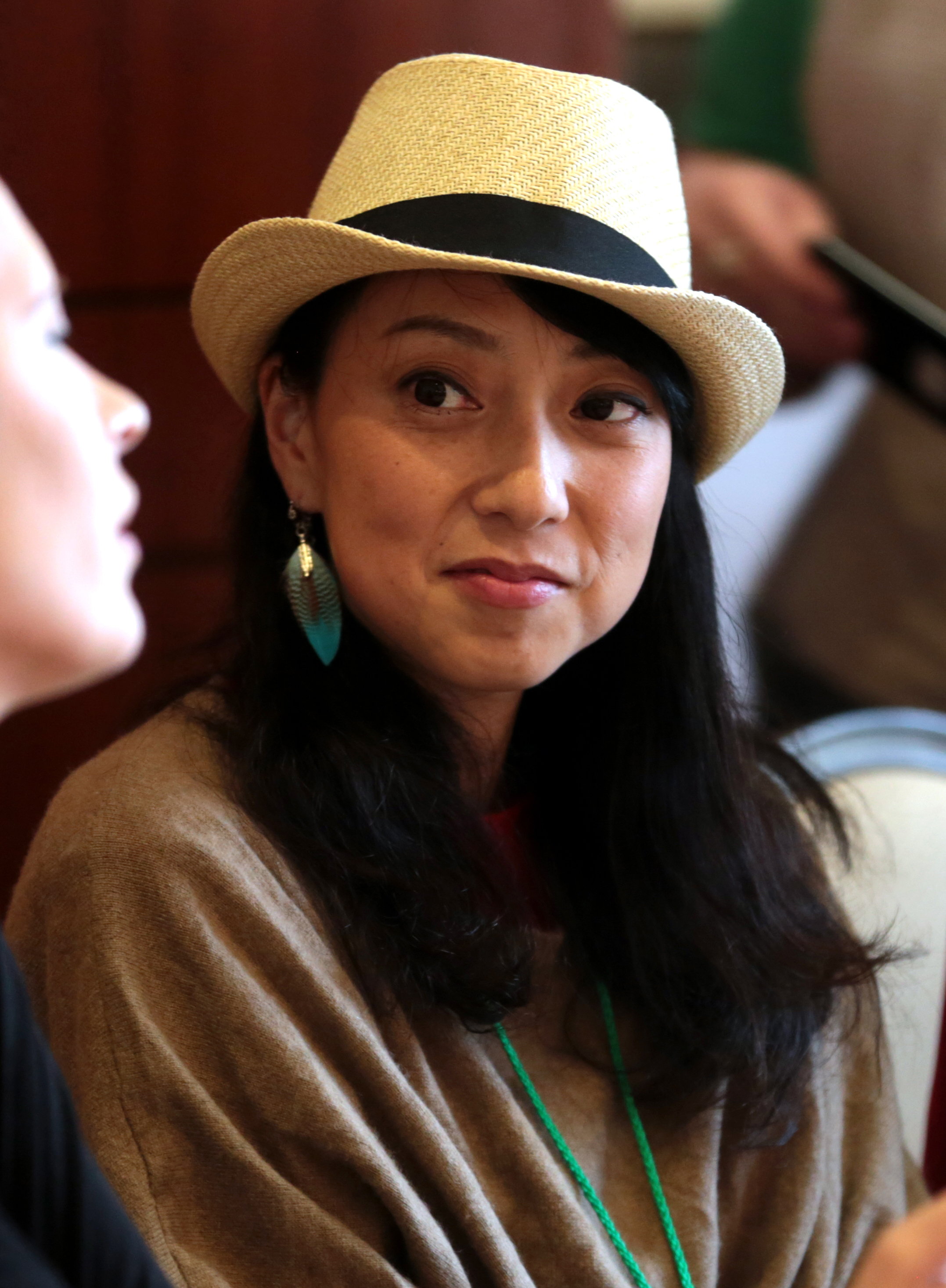
Yūko Miyamura

- January 7 – Tamakasuga Ryōji, sumo wrestler
- January 8 – Ryō Tamura, comedian
- January 10 – Shuntaro Furukawa, businessman
- January 13
  - Yukiko Iwai, voice actress
  - Akinori Otsuka, baseball pitcher
- January 17 – Ken Hirai, singer-songwriter
- January 22 – Romi Park, voice actress
- January 24 – Junko Kubo, announcer and presenter
- January 28 – Tsuyoshi Shinjo, baseball player
- January 29 – Masaru Hamaguchi, comedian
- February 2 – Hisashi Tonomura, musician
- February 5 – Koriki Chōshū, comedian
- February 7 – Akiko Suwanai, violinist
- February 8 – Hiroshi Tsuchida, actor and voice actor
- February 17 – Yuki Isoya, singer
- March 10 – Takashi Fujii (Matthew Minami), television performer
- March 29 – Junichi Suwabe, voice actor
- April 5 – Junko Takeuchi, voice actress
- April 30 – Takako Tokiwa, voice actress
- May 6 – Naoko Takahashi, long-distance runner
- May 16 – Hideki Naganuma, DJ and composer
- May 21 – Kaoru Fujino, voice actress
- May 30 – Sōichirō Hoshi, voice actor
- July 1 – Tetsu Inada, voice actor
- July 5 – Tatsuhito Takaiwa, Zainichi-Korean wrestler
- July 8 – Shōsuke Tanihara, actor
- July 14 – Masami Suzuki, voice actress
- July 19 – Naohito Fujiki, actor and singer
- July 27
  - Takako Fuji, actress
  - Takashi Shimizu, director
- August 3 – Atsunori Inaba, baseball coach and former player
- August 14 – Takako Honda, voice actress
- August 20 – Anna Umemiya, model
- September 8 – Tomokazu Seki, voice actor
- September 10 – Rio Tahara, snowboarder
- September 20 – Sawa Suzuki, actress
- September 29 – Taizo Son, entrepreneur and investor
- October 7 – Masanari Mochida, slalom canoeist
- October 9 – Kōki Miyata, voice actor
- October 19 – Sayaka Aoki, voice actress
- October 21 – Masakazu Morita, voice actor
- October 29 – Takafumi Horie, entrepreneur
- November 1 – Naoki Yanagi, voice actor
- November 9 – Naomi Shindou, voice actor
- November 13 – Takuya Kimura, member of SMAP and actor
- December 3 – Saki Takaoka, actress
- December 4 – Yūko Miyamura, voice actress and singer
- December 12 – Arihito Muramatsu, baseball player
- December 13 – Jun Itoda, comedian
- December 14 – Kiriko Nananan, manga artist (d. 2024)
- December 18 – Shinji Takeda, actor
- December 20
  - Hideki Niwa, politician
  - Takeshi Rikio, professional wrestler
- December 22 – Takayuki Yokoyama, football player
- December 28 – Shinobu Terajima, actress

== Deaths ==
- February 17 – Taiko Hirabayashi, writer (b. 1905)
- April 16 – Yasunari Kawabata, writer, Nobel Prize laureate (b. 1899)
- August 24 – Jinichi Kusaka, admiral (b. 1888)
- August 26 – Goroku Amemiya, photographer (b. 1886)
- October 4 – Tarō Shōji, popular song singer (b. 1898)

== See also ==
- 1972 in Japanese television
- List of Japanese films of 1972
- 1972 in Japanese music
