= 1972 in Japanese television =

Events in 1972 in Japanese television.

== Events ==
- April 1 - UHB launches

== Debuts ==
Show	Station	Premiere Date	Genre	Original Run
Android Kikaider	NET	July 8	tokusatsu	July 8, 1972 – May 5, 1973
Astroganger	Nippon TV	October 4	anime	October 4, 1972 – March 28, 1973
Chōjin Barom-1	Nippon TV	April 2	tokusatsu	April 2, 1972 – November 26, 1972
Devilman	NET	July 8	anime	July 8, 1972 – April 7, 1973
Dokonjō Gaeru	TBS	October 7	anime	October 7, 1972 – September 28, 1974
Ike! Godman	Nippon TV	October 5	tokusatsu	October 5, 1972 - April 10, 1973
Iron King	TBS	October 8	tokusatsu	October 8, 1972 – April 8, 1973
Kaiketsu Lion-Maru	Fuji TV	April 1	tokusatsu	April 1, 1972 - April 7, 1973
Mahōtsukai Chappy	NET	April 3	anime	April 3, 1972 – December 2, 1972
Mazinger Z	Fuji TV	December 3	anime	December 3, 1972 – September 1, 1974
Mokku of the Oak Tree	Fuji TV	January 4	anime	January 4, 1972 - January 1, 1973
New Moomin	Fuji TV	January 9	anime	January 9, 1972 - December 31, 1972
Redman	Nippon TV	April 3	tokusatsu	April 3, 1972 – September 8, 1972
Sasuga no Sarutobi	Fuji TV	October 17	anime	October 17, 1972 – March 11, 1974
Science Ninja Team Gatchaman	Fuji TV	October 1	anime	October 1, 1972 – September 29, 1974
Triton of the Sea	Fuji TV	April 1	anime	April 1, 1972 – September 30, 1972
Tamagon the Counselor	Fuji TV	October 5	anime	October 5, 1972 – September 28, 1973
Ultraman Ace	TBS	April 7	tokusatsu	April 7, 1972 – March 30, 1973
Warrior of Love Rainbowman	NET	October 6	tokusatsu	October 6, 1972 – September 18, 1973
Wild 7	Nippon TV	October 9	drama	October 9, 1972 – March 26, 1973

== Ongoings ==
- Music Fair, music (1964-present)
- Key Hunter, drama (1968–1973)
- Mito Kōmon, jidaigeki (1969-2011)
- Sazae-san, anime (1969-present)
- Ōedo Sōsamō, jidaigeki (1970-1984)
- Ōoka Echizen, jidaigeki (1970-1999)
- Kamen Rider, tokusatsu (1971–1973)
- Star Tanjō!, talent (1971-1983)

== Endings ==
Show	Station	Ending Date	Genre	Original Run
Chōjin Barom-1	Nippon TV	November 26	tokusatsu	April 2, 1972 – November 26, 1972
Inakappe Taishō	Fuji TV	September 24	anime	October 4, 1970 – September 24, 1972
Mirrorman	Fuji TV	November 26	tokusatsu	December 5, 1971 – November 26, 1972
New Moomin	Fuji TV	December 31	anime	January 9, 1972 - December 31, 1972
Redman	Nippon TV	September 8	tokusatsu	April 3, 1972 – September 8, 1972
Sarutobi Ecchan	NET	March 27	anime	October 4, 1971 - March 27, 1972
Spectreman	Fuji TV	March 25	tokusatsu	January 2, 1971 - March 25, 1972
Tensai Bakabon	Nippon TV	June 24	anime	September 25, 1971 – June 24, 1972
Triton of the Sea	Fuji TV	September 30	anime	April 1, 1972 – September 30, 1972
The Return of Ultraman	TBS	March 31	tokusatsu	April 2, 1971 – March 31, 1972

== See also ==
- 1972 in anime
- 1972 in Japan
- List of Japanese films of 1972
