= Lone Wolf and Cub: Baby Cart in the Land of Demons =

- Directed by: Kenji Misumi
- Screenplay by: Kazuo Koike; Tsutomu Nakamura
- Based on: the manga by Kazuo Koike and Goseki Kojima
- Produced by: Tomisaburo Wakayama; Masanori Sanada
- Starring: Tomisaburo Wakayama; Michiyo Ōkusu; Akihiro Tomikawa; Shingo Yamashiro
- Cinematography: Fujio Morita
- Edited by: Toshio Taniguchi
- Music by: Eiken Sakurai
- Production company: Katsu
- Distributed by: Toho
- Release date: 11 August 1973 (Japan)
- Running time: 89 minutes
- Country: Japan

Lone Wolf and Cub: Baby Cart in the Land of Demons (子連れ狼 冥府魔道, Kozure Ōkami: Meifu Madō; "Wolf with Child in Tow: Crossroads to Hell") is the fifth in a series of six Japanese martial arts films based on the long-running Lone Wolf and Cub manga series about Ogami Ittō, a wandering assassin for hire who is accompanied by his young son, Daigoro.

== Plot ==
On his travels on "the Demon Path in Hell", Ogami Itto is confronted by a series of five messengers who represent a clan wanting his services. Each assassin in turn administers a specific test of his abilities, and when bested gives Ogami partial payment for the job and, as per his usual stipulation, discloses some of the "secrets and reasons" for the killing. By the time Ogami has defeated all the messengers, he has been informed of a conspiracy to disguise a daimyō's illegitimate female offspring as a prince and heir to the clan, while the official offspring, a son, is kept imprisoned and concealed. A letter detailing the plot is being delivered by a high priest, who in reality is a "grass" or secret ninja agent, to the shōgun, which would mean the dissolution of the clan, leaving retainers, samurai, and vassals without support—a disastrous end. Ogami is to intercept the priest carrying the letter, kill him and retrieve the letter; the priest will be traveling under the protection of Ogami's arch-enemy, Yagyū Retsudō, further complicating the mission.

On a stopover at a town festival, Ogami's young son Daigoro is separated from his father and embarks his own personal adventure when he gets mixed up with Oyo, a notorious female pickpocket being chased by local militia. She gives him a stolen wallet to hold for her and requests him never to tell anyone. Arrested as Oyo's accomplice, Daigoro is stripped and flogged before the townspeople. He continues to keep his promise even after Oyo confesses and eventually gets released.

En route to intercept the priest, Ogami is contracted by a young woman, named Shiranui, to kill the retired lord, his concubine and the young daughter. Ogami, then in a skilled move, swims underwater to a boat containing the high priest and steals the letter. After securing the letter, he defeats said lord and his seven bodyguards. Ogami finally parts with Shiranui and takes Daigoro with him on a boat to sail away.

== Cast ==
- Tomisaburo Wakayama as Ogami Ittō
- Akihiro Tomikawa as Daigoro
- Akira Yamauchi as Ayabe Ukon, Messenger 1
- Hideji Otaki as Mogami Shusuke, Messenger 2
- Taketoshi Naitō as Mawatara Hachiro, Messenger 3
- Fujio Suga as Kikuchi Yamon, Messenger 4
- Rokko Toura as Sazare Kanbei, Messenger 5
- Shingo Yamashiro as Lord Kuroda Naritaka
- Tomomi Sato as "Quick Change" Oyo
- Michiyo Ōkusu as Shiranui
- Koji Fujiyama as Tomekichi the Mole
- Sumida Kazuyo as Hamachiyo
- Bin Amatsu as Inspector Senzo
- Taizen Shishido as Izumi Kazuna
- Eiji Okada as Wakita
- Minoru Ōki as Yagyu Retsudo

== Release ==
Lone Wolf and Cub: Baby Cart in the Land of Demons was released theatrically in Japan on 11 August 1973 where it was distributed by Toho. The film was released on home video by Samurai Cinema, a division of AnimEigo with English subtitles on 20 July 1997.

== Sources ==
- Galbraith IV, Stuart (2008). The Toho Studios Story: A History and Complete Filmography. Scarecrow Press. ISBN 978-1461673743.
