= Shin Kishida =

Japanese actor

- 岸田 森 (きしだ しん)
- Born: 17 October 1939; Asagaya, Suginami, Tokyo, Japan
- Died: 28 December 1982 (aged 43); Tokyo, Japan
- Resting place: Kamakura Cemetery
- Other names: Shin Akekawa 朱川 審 (あけかわ しん)
- Education: Hosei University
- Occupation: Actor
- Years active: 1962–1982
- Spouse: Kirin Kiki (m. 1964; div. 1968)
- Relatives: Kunio Kishida (uncle); Kyōko Kishida (cousin)

Shin Kishida (岸田 森, 17 October 1939 – 28 December 1982) was a Japanese television, film, and stage actor.

== Biography ==
Shin Kishida was born at Kawakita General Hospital in Asagaya, Suginami, Tokyo. His uncle was playwright Kunio Kishida, and actress Kyōko Kishida and children's author Eriko Kishida were his first cousins. He lived in Nakano until the age of five.

In 1944 he enrolled in Yumoto Elementary School in Hakone, Kanagawa, where he was sent to live as part of a wartime evacuation of children from major cities. He returned to Tokyo in 1947, and transferred to Kudan Elementary School, Chiyoda, Tokyo. After graduating from Kojimachi Junior High School (Kojimachi Chūgakkō, where he became friends with future politician Koichi Katō) and Kaijō High School (Kaijō Kōkō), he took a year off from his studies before entering the English literature department of Hōsei University. However, he dropped out in his second year after deciding to become an actor.

=== Debut ===
In 1961 Kishida joined a drama study group attached to the Bungakuza theater troupe. The following year he joined Bungakuza as an apprentice and became a full-fledged member in 1965, but left in early 1966 to form the theater group Rokugatsu Gekijo (June Theater) with his wife Yūki Chiho, Katsumi Matsumura and others, and subsequently concentrated on film and television work.

Kishida may be best-remembered for playing Hammer-esque vampires in Tōhō's Bloodthirsty film series. Many Japanese fans regard Kishida and Christopher Lee as the quintessential screen vampires. Coincidentally, Kishida appeared alongside Shigeru Amachi, a pioneer of the Japanese vampire role in Nobuo Nakagawa's The Lady Vampire (Onna Kyuketsuki, 1959) on the 6th episode of the television period drama Mushuku Samurai in 1973. Kishida appeared in several works by Tsuburaya Productions including Return of Ultraman (Kaette kita Urutoraman) and Operation: Mystery! (Kaiki Daisakusen).

He wrote screenplays under the name Shin Akekawa, such as episode 35 of Return of Ultraman, "Zankoku! Hikari Kaiju Purizuma". Kishida's design for the light-inspired Prisma monster is widely regarded as the most beautiful of the second wave of Ultra Series monsters, and features in many books on the subject. As Shin Kishida he also wrote a script for episode 12 of the Tokusatsu show Fireman.

Kishida also worked frequently with director Kihachi Okamoto, and was a key figure in his latter works. His sidesplitting portrayal of a garish suit-wearing enemy yakuza captain in Dainamaito Dondon, and his turn as an eerie secretary to a political mastermind in Blue Christmas (the epitome of his stated desire to appear in brief supporting roles that change the tone of an entire film) are some of his most representative work.

He also formed a celebrated partnership with Akio Jissōji, a former colleague from his days working for Tsuburaya. His 1977 film, Utamaro's World (Utamaro: Yume to Shiriseba), was probably frequent Kishida's only lead role in a major production (although he does not headline the film), and was screened at the Cannes Film Festival.

From time to time, he deliberately shaved his head and wore a wig for his roles in the television series Kizudarake no Tenshi and Tantei Monogatari. In a guest appearance as "Phantom Thief #103" on the 13th episode of Tantei Monogatari, he engages in a fencing duel with star Yūsaku Matsuda towards the end. A thrust by Matsuda's character connects with the Phantom Thief's hair, ripping off his wig and exposing his bald pate with the number 103 neatly written on it.

=== Marriages ===
In 1964 Kishida married actress Yūki Chiho (then stage name of Keiko Nakatani which she later changed to Kirin Kiki). They divorced in 1968. Kishida later remarried, but this second marriage also ended in divorce.

=== Influence ===
A regular in the works of directors Kihachi Okamoto, Akio Jissoji and Tatsumi Kumashiro, Kishida was revered by many actors including Kenichi Hagiwara, Yutaka Mizutani and Yūsaku Matsuda. Fellow Bungakuza actor Daigo Kusano was his lifelong best friend.

Shintaro Katsu also praised him highly for his talent and character, and appeared alongside him in several films. Kishida also worked as an instructor for Katsu's acting school "Katsu Academy". One of his students was Kazuki Kosakai.

Actor Asao Kobayashi, who co-starred with Kishida in Taiyō Sentai Sun Vulcan, was so overcome by the shock of Kishida's sudden death that he took a hiatus from acting and left show business permanently a few years later.

=== Death ===
On 28 December 1982, Kishida died of esophageal cancer, aged 43. Shortly after news of Kishida's death, television reruns of his final tokusatsu series "Solar Squadron Sun Vulcan" began in the Tokyo area, and his first appearance in the opening episode of the series was accompanied by a memorial message.

== Filmography ==
- Hôrô-ki (1962)
- A Story Written with Water (1965) - Takao Matsutani
- Shayô no omokage (1967) - Keiji Taniyama
- Kill! (1968) - Jurota Arao
- Sogeki (1968)
- Dankon (1969)
- Red Lion (1969) - Secretary Sokichi
- Hakucyu no syugeki (1970)
- Zatoichi Meets Yojimbo (1970) - Kuzuryu
- Onna Gokuakuchō (1970)
- Genkai yûkyôden: Yabure kabure (1970) - Gisaburo Sakurai
- Gekido no showashi 'Gunbatsu' (1970) - (uncredited)
- Zenigeba (1970)
- Kitsune no kureta akanbô (1971) - Einoshin Katsuya
- Battle of Okinawa (1971)
- Lake of Dracula (1971) - The Vampire
- Gekido no showashi: Okinawa kessen (1971)
- Mandara (1971)
- Inn of Evil (1971) - Yoshinosuke
- The Return of Ultraman (1971, TV Series) - Ken Sakata
- Uta (1972)
- Hyaku-nin no Daibôken (1972)
- Hyakuman-nin no dai-gasshô (1972) - Miyahara
- Lone Wolf and Cub: Baby Cart at the River Styx (1972) - Kuruma Hidari
- Nippon sanjûshi: Osaraba Tokyo no maki (1972) - Morikawa
- Lone Wolf and Cub: Baby Cart in Peril (1972) - Kozuka Enki
- Kôkôsei burai hikae (1972) - Muraki
- Fireman (1973, TV series) - Dr. Saburo Mizushima
- Hanzo the Razor: The Snare (1973)
- Kaseki no Mori (1973)
- Oniwaban (1974) - Abbot Genkai
- Godzilla vs. Mechagodzilla (1974) - Interpol Agent Nanbara
- Lady Snowblood 2: Love Song of Vengeance (1974) - Seishiro Kikui
- Evil of Dracula (1974) - The Principal
- Karafuto 1945 Summer Hyosetsu no mon (1974)
- Aoba shigereru (1974)
- Asaki yumemishi (1974)
- Lost love: abura jigoku (1974)
- Kushi no hi (1975) - Tabe
- Kurobara shôten (1975) - Juzo
- Hatsukoi (1975) - Kimura
- Eden no umi (1976) - Matsushita
- Zoku ningen kakumei (1976)
- Hito goroshi (1976)
- Utamaro: Yume to shiriseba (1977) - Utamaro
- Sugata Sanshiro (1977)
- Shag (1978) - Masao Ikeda
- Dainamaito don don (1978) - Osamu
- Blue Christmas (1978)
- Hakuchyu no shikaku (1979) - Koichi Sumita
- Midare karakuri (1979)
- Kindaichi Kosuke no boken (1979) - Vampire
- Yomigaeru kinrô (1979) - Ishii
- Howaito rabu (1979)
- Sûpâ gun redei Wani Bunsho (1979) - Tetsuo Ogata / Detective, Mika's Boss
- Eireitachi no oenka: saigo no sôkeisen (1979) - Teramoto
- G.I. Samurai (1979) - Naoe Bungo
- Sochô no kubi (1979) - Assassin
- Oretachi wa Tenshi da! (1979 TV Series) - episode#5
- Dôran (1980) - Kobayashi
- Tokugawa ichizoku no houkai (1980) - Tokugawa Ie-mochi (14th-Sho-Gun)
- Shogun Assassin (1980) - Master of Death
- Hyôryû (1981)
- Morning Moon Wa Sozatsu Ni (1981)
- Chikagoro naze ka Charusuton (1981)
- Taiyo Sentai Sun Vulcan (1981-1982, TV Series) - Commander Arashiyama
- Conquest (1982) - Ichikawa
- Antarctica (1983) - Kissaten Master

=== Voice acting ===
- Dog Day Afternoon (1979 Fuji TV edition) – Salvatore "Sal" Naturile (John Cazale)
- The Exorcist (1980 TBS edition) – Father Damien Karras (Jason Miller)
- Lawrence of Arabia (1978 Nippon TV edition) – T. E. Lawrence (Peter O'Toole)
