= Shogun Assassin =

1980 jidaigeki film

- Theatrical release poster
- Directed by: Kenji Misumi; Robert Houston
- Screenplay by: Robert Houston; David Weisman; Kazuo Koike
- Based on: Lone Wolf and Cub by Kazuo Koike and Goseki Kojima
- Produced by: Shintaro Katsu; Hisaharu Matsubara; David Weisman
- Starring: Tomisaburo Wakayama; Kayo Mautso; Akiji Kobayashi
- Cinematography: Chishi Makiura
- Edited by: Lee Percy
- Music by: W. Michael Lewis; Mark Lindsay
- Production companies: Toho; Katsu; Baby-Cart Productions
- Distributed by: New World Pictures
- Release date: November 11, 1980 (United States)
- Running time: 90 minutes
- Countries: Japan; United States
- Language: English

Shogun Assassin is a 1980 jidaigeki film directed by Kenji Misumi and Robert Houston. It was edited and compiled from the first two films in the Lone Wolf and Cub series, using 12 minutes of the first film, Lone Wolf and Cub: Sword of Vengeance (Kozure Ōkami: Kowokashi Udekashi Tsukamatsuru or Wolf with Child in Tow: Child and Expertise for Rent), and most of Lone Wolf and Cub: Baby Cart at the River Styx (Kozure Ōkami: Sanzu no Kawa no Ubaguruma or Wolf with Child in Tow: Perambulator of the River of Sanzu), both released in 1972 and based on the long-running 1970s manga series Lone Wolf and Cub created by the writer Kazuo Koike and the artist Goseki Kojima.

== Plot ==
As the opening credits roll, an abbreviated version of Ogami Ittō's (Tomisaburô Wakayama) past as Shogunate Decapitator and his wife's murder by ninja are seen, with Daigorō (Akihiro Tomikawa) providing the narration.

Two hooded samurai attack Ogami while he is pushing a cart with Daigorō inside. Ogami fends off the attack and kills both attackers.

As Ogami and Daigorō sit by a roadside fire and eat their evening meal, Ogami remembers how he offered the infant Daigorō the life–death choice: either Ogami's sword (which would mean that Daigorō would join him on his mission of vengeance against the Shogun) or Daigorō's ball (which would mean that Daigorō would be killed so that he could be with his mother in heaven). Daigorō chooses the sword. The next day, the Shogun's officials bring Ogami the Shogun's orders: either swear eternal loyalty or commit seppuku with Daigorō. Ogami chooses to fight his way to freedom with Daigorō, only to have his path blocked by the leader of the Yagyu clan, in charge of the Shogun's spies and assassins. The leader challenges Ogami to fight his son Kurando in a duel; if Ogami wins, he wins his freedom. Ogami accepts. Despite Kurando's having the strategic advantage of having the sun behind him and Daigorō riding on Ogami's back, at the last moment, Ogami ducks his head to reveal a mirror bound on Daigorō's forehead, which reflects the sun into Kurando's eyes, blinding him long enough for Ogami to slice off Kurando's head.

Ogami and Daigorō journey on, never stopping in one place for very long as the Shogun's ninjas are always following them. As they wander, Daigorō recalls how the Shogun's other son Lord Bizen (Taketoshi Naitô) and his men were given orders to kill him. Even though Bizen's men are wearing armor beneath their robes, Ogami's skill and blade are too powerful. Ogami lures Lord Bizen into the middle of a stream, concealing his sword underwater within his left hand while pretending it is clutched in his right, prompting Bizen to strike at his right hand, while Ogami counters with his concealed blade, killing him. Ogami sees the Yagyu daimyo watching from a distance and he will destroy him and all of his ninjas.

The self-titled "Supreme Ninja", a female (Kayo Matsuo), receives orders from the Shogun to kill Ogami and Daigorō. Lord Kurogawa (Akiji Kobayashi) does not believe the "Supreme Ninja's" women are up to the task, so she has eight of her ninjas simultaneously swordfight Kurogawa's strongest ninja, Junai. Junai never succeeds in injuring any of the women, but continues to fight as long as possible as various of his body parts are removed, until the final coup de grace.

Ogami and Daigorō meet secretly with a client to discuss an assassination request. Ogami is asked to kill Lord Kiru (the Shogun's brother), and in return he will receive a thousand pieces of gold. Ogami accepts the mission and is told that Lord Kiru is being escorted by a three-brother team known as the 'Masters of Death.'

During Ogami and Daigorō's journey, they are attacked several times by The "Supreme Ninja's" women, but Ogami kills them each time. Ogami finally faces the "Supreme Ninja" herself. She attacks Ogami with a weighted net that contains fishhooks, but Ogami cuts himself free and the "Supreme Ninja" flees by running away backwards.

Ogami and Daigorō keep on traveling, but they now come face-to-face with Lord Kurogawa's entire ninja force. Pushing Daigorō in his cart to safety, Ogami uses the spear blades in the cart's handrails to attack. All but two of the ninja are cut down, but Ogami is left wounded. He manages to push Daigorō to the safety of a deserted hut before collapsing from loss of blood. Daigorō goes in search of water for his father, finally bringing it back in his mouth, then takes some food offerings from a roadside shrine, leaving his jacket in honorable exchange.

The "Supreme Ninja" meets with Lord Kurogawa to report her failure, but Lord Kurogawa has another plan: to strike at Ogami through Daigorō.

Later that night, Daigorō is lured outside the hut by the sound of a woman singing. Waking up to find Daigorō gone, Ogami searches for his son. He finds Daigorō is a prisoner of Lord Kurogawa and the "Supreme Ninja". Daigorō is tied up and suspended over a deep well; Kurogawa demands that Ogami surrender or he will drop Daigorō down the well. Ogami refuses, so Kurogawa and his men attack. Kurogawa lets go of the rope suspending Daigorō over the well, but Ogami manages to stamp his foot down on the rope, stopping the drop, and kill Kurogawa (and his two ninjas) at the same time. Ignoring the "Supreme Ninja", who has not moved throughout the fight, Ogami carefully pulls Daigorō, who has survived, up to safety. Instead of killing the "Supreme Ninja", Ogami walks away with Daigorō.

Ogami and Daigorō board a ship which is carrying the 'Masters of Death' to their rendezvous with Lord Kiru. Also on board is the unobtrusive "Supreme Ninja". Rebels attack the 'Masters of Death', but are easily dispatched. During the night, the sole remaining rebel starts a fire onboard the ship. In the ensuing inferno, the 'Masters of Death' tell Ogami that they recognize him, but that they will not attack him...as long as he makes no move against them and Lord Kiru, and then leave him. The companionway is blocked by flames, so he cuts through the deck planking. Ogami then puts Daigorō in his cart and throws both overboard to safety, before pole-vaulting himself into the sea. The "Supreme Ninja" attacks Ogami from underwater but he overpowers her. Getting Daigorō, himself, and the "Supreme Ninja" to shore and then to the shelter of a fisherman's hut, he strips all three of them naked and gathers them close together, telling the "Supreme Ninja" that they must share their body heat or die. The "Supreme Ninja" does not understand why he would save her and then realizes she cannot kill Ogami or his son. The next day, Ogami and Daigorō leave her there, knowing that she will have to return to the Shogun, report her failure and commit suicide.

The 'Masters of Death' escort Lord Kiru and his entourage through a desert of sand dunes, where they are attacked by a rebel force concealed under the sand. The 'Masters of Death' kill all of the rebels, and Lord Kiru is taken to safety. However, they have not gone far before they see Daigorō standing in their path. He points in the distance towards Ogami, who is waiting for them to come to him, and so move away from his son who could be a liability. The 'Masters of Death' finally face off against Ogami, but one by one they are cut down. Ogami then chases after Lord Kiru's procession, killing or driving off the guards. Lord Kiru protests that he is the Shogun's brother, but Ogami tells Kiru that the "Shogun means nothing" to him. Ogami then cuts Lord Kiru down.

As he and his father walk away from the carnage, Daigorō looks back one last time and says via voice-over, "I guess I wish it was different ... but a wish is only a wish". The final shot is a freeze-frame close-up of Daigorō's face looking back.

== Cast ==
Cast
Character	Live actor	English dub actor
Lone Wolf	Tomisaburou Wakayama	Lamont Johnson
Supreme Ninja	Kayo Matsuo	Sandra Bernhard
Eldest Master of Death	Minoru Ooki	
Middle Master of Death	Shougen Nitta	
Youngest Master of Death	Shin Kishida	
Daigorou	Akihiro Tomikawa	Gibran Evans
Azami	Reiko Kasahara	
Lord Kurogawa	Akiji Kobayashi	
Lord Bizen	Taketoshi Naitou	
The Shogun	Yūnosuke Itō	

Other English dub actors:

- Marshall Efron
- Lennie Weinrib
- Sam Weisman
- Mark Lindsay
- Robert Houston
- David Weisman
- Sandra Bernhard

== Production ==
Shogun Assassin is a combination of two Japanese films, predominantly that of Baby-cart at the River Styx (1972) and 12 minutes of Sword of Vengeance. In Japan the movie is known as 子連れ狼,, Kozure Okami.

The project was directed by Robert Houston and his partner David Weisman, a protégé of Andy Warhol and director of Ciao! Manhattan (1972). A fan of the original Kozure Ōkami films, Weisman had obtained the rights for $50,000 from the American office of Toho Studios.

The title character, Ogami Ittō, is played by Tomisaburo Wakayama, brother of the producer, Shintaro Katsu, who is known for playing Zatoichi in a series of 26 films starting in the 1960s.

== Release ==
Shogun Assassin was released theatrically in the United States 11 November 1980 by Roger Corman's New World Pictures to the grindhouse movie circuit in the United States, and then later as a video cassette from MCA/Universal Home Video. When released in the United Kingdom by the Vipco video tape label in 1983, Shogun Assassin's extreme violence almost caused it to be banned in the UK by the Home Office. Vipco played this for publicity in the cover art of their 2000 release on DVD, which was stamped "Banned since 1983!" The poster and title treatment was created by artist Jim Evans. Jim's son Gibran Evans voiced the narrative as Daigorō. In 2006 it was restored and re-released on DVD in the United States by AnimEigo, and again in 2016 by Criterion for Blu-Ray.

== Reception ==
From contemporary reviews, Vincent Canby of The New York Times, wrote Shogun Assassin "is as furiously mixed up as What's Up, Tiger Lily?" and that outside "the little-boy's narration, the movie's not much fun once you've gotten the picture, which is that of a tubby, outcast samurai wandering the length and breadth of Japan, pushing an antique baby carriage that contains his tiny, remarkably observant son." John Pym (Monthly Film Bulletin) found that "the impetus of the original director's intention seems somehow to have been turned round by having the story related from the point of view of the uncomprehending Daigorō", whose narration he compared to that of Linda Manz's Days of Heaven). "What has evidently animated this American version is the packaging of ample bloodshed with the minimum of explanation. Thus, we never really learn why the samurai's wife is murdered; and such scenes as the one in which the headsman compels his son to make a fateful choice between a sword and a pretty raffia ball go for nothing." The review concluded that "the swordplay is of a high, non-exploitative order, and what narrative elements remain—the fire of the ship, for example—are handled with admirable vigour".

From retrospective reviews, Stuart Galbraith IV of DVD Talk said, "A radical reworking of not one but two Japanese movies combined into a single action-filled extravaganza, Shogun Assassin floored audiences with its dream-like, poetic action and pressure-cooker bloodletting." Tim Lucas (Sight & Sound) described Houston's version as an "ingenious and deeply imagined reinterpretation also turns out to be a conspicuous example of a beloved grindhouse experience that was in fact rewritten, [rescored] (by Mark Lindsay of Paul Revere and the Raiders) and disembowelled in the cutting room".

== In popular culture ==
Dialogue excerpts from the film have been sampled in hip-hop music, with samples from the film being prominently featured in several songs from the 1995 album Liquid Swords by GZA. Dialogue from the film was also sampled in the song "Agent Orange" by rapper Cage, from his debut album Movies for the Blind (2002). In the 2004 film Kill Bill: Volume 2, Beatrix Kiddo and her four-year-old daughter watch the film as a bedtime story.

== See also ==
- Jidaigeki
- Exploitation film

== Bibliography ==
- Galbraith IV, Stuart (2008). The Toho Studios Story: A History and Complete Filmography. Scarecrow Press. ISBN 978-1461673743.
