= Lone Wolf and Cub: White Heaven in Hell =

- Directed by: Yoshiyuki Kuroda
- Screenplay by: Tsutomu Nakamura
- Based on: Lone Wolf and Cub by Kazuo Koike and Goseki Kojima
- Produced by: Tomisaburo Wakayama; Masanori Sanada
- Starring: Tomisaburo Wakayama; Akihiro Tomikawa; Junko Hitomi; Goro Mutsumi
- Cinematography: Chishi Makiura
- Edited by: Toshio Taniguchi
- Music by: Kunihiko Murai
- Production company: Katsu
- Distributed by: Toho
- Release date: 24 April 1974 (Japan)
- Running time: 84 minutes
- Country: Japan

Lone Wolf and Cub: White Heaven in Hell (子連れ狼 地獄へ行くぞ!大五郎, Kozure Ōkami: Jigoku e ikuzo! Daigoro; literally "Wolf with Child in Tow: Let's Go To Hell, Daigoro!") is the final entry in a series of six Japanese martial arts films based on the long-running Lone Wolf and Cub manga series about Ogami Ittō, a wandering assassin for hire who is accompanied by his young son, Daigoro. Although this is the last film in the series, it does not end the story or include the conclusion of the series as written in the manga.

== Plot ==
After the Shogun threatens to disgrace the Yagyū clan because of their continual failure to kill the wandering swordsman Ogami Ittō and his infant son Daigoro, Lord Yagyū Retsudo sends his daughter and last remaining child Kaori, an expert with flying daggers, to kill them. After she is killed, Retsudo attempts to use the Tsuchigumo, a secretive mountain clan that practices black magic and is commanded by Hyouei, an illegitimate son of Retsudo who is determined to cause the downfall of the Yagyū by killing Ittō and Daigoro himself. Hyouei sends his three most fearsome followers, whose abilities include the ability to burrow through the earth and who kill anyone Ittō and Daigoro come into contact with.

Ittō soon confronts and defeats Hyouei in sword combat along with all of his men. Fleeing to the mountains of northern Japan, Ittō turns the tables on the three Tsuchigumo who cannot burrow under snow and ice and kills all three of them as well.

The story culminates in a final battle between Ittō and the combined Japanese clan groups, numbering over 100 men, under Retsudo's personal command on a snow-capped mountain, where the baby cart becomes a sled. Ittō once again uses the baby cart's weapons first by gunning down a third of the army with the baby cart's Gatling machine gun, then using the cart's weapons with which Ittō ends up shooting, stabbing, slashing, dismembering, and beheading the entire army. But the one-eyed Retsudo once again escapes by riding away on a sled, vowing to kill Ittō another day.

== Cast ==
- Tomisaburo Wakayama as Ogami Ittō
- Akihiro Tomikawa as Daigoro
- Junko Hitomi as Yagyū Kaori
- Isao Kimura as Yagyū Hyouei
- Gorō Mutsumi as Ishine Kokaku
- Minoru Ōki as Yagyū Retsudo

== Release ==
Lone Wolf and Cub: White Heaven in Hell was released theatrically in Japan on 24 April 1974. The film was released on home video in the United States as Lone Wolf and Cub - White Heaven in Hell by Samurai Cinema, a division of AnimEigo, Inc. The film was later released by the Criterion Collection on DVD and Blu-ray on November 8, 2016.

== See also ==
- List of Japanese films of 1974

== Bibliography ==
- Galbraith IV, Stuart (2008). The Toho Studios Story: A History and Complete Filmography. Scarecrow Press. ISBN 9781461673743.
