= Lone Wolf and Cub: Sword of Vengeance =

- Film poster
- Directed by: Kenji Misumi
- Screenplay by: Kazuo Koike
- Based on: Lone Wolf and Cub by Kazuo Koike and Goseki Kojima
- Produced by: Shintaro Katsu; Hisaharu Matsubara
- Starring: Tomisaburo Wakayama; Akihiro Tomikawa; Fumio Watanabe; Shigeru Tsuyuguchi
- Cinematography: Chishi Maikura
- Edited by: Toshio Taniguchi
- Music by: Eiken Sakurai
- Production company: Katsu
- Distributed by: Toho
- Release date: 15 January 1972 (Japan)
- Running time: 87 minutes
- Country: Japan
- Language: Japanese
- Box office: ¥254.03 million (rentals)

Lone Wolf and Cub: Sword of Vengeance (Japanese: 子連れ狼 子を貸し腕貸しつかまつる, Hepburn: Kozure Ōkami: Kowokashi udekashi tsukamatsuru) is a 1972 Japanese chambara film directed by Kenji Misumi. The film tells the story of Ogami Ittō, a wandering assassin for hire who is accompanied by his young son, Daigoro. It is the first in a series of six films in the Lone Wolf and Cub series.

== Plot ==
Set in Japan during an unspecified year of the Edo period, Ogami Ittō, the disgraced former Kogi Kaishakunin (executioner) to the shōgun, wanders the countryside, pushing a baby cart with his 3-year-old son Daigoro inside. A sashimono banner hangs off his back: "Ogami: Suiouryo technique. Sword For Hire. Son For Hire." His services are asked for in a most unexpected way, when an unstable woman seizes Daigoro from the cart and tries to breastfeed the boy. Daigoro at first hesitates, but after a stern look from his father, he proceeds to suckle the woman's breast. The woman's mother then apologizes for her daughter's behavior and tries to give Ittō money, but the stoic rōnin refuses, saying his son was hungry anyway.

As he walks in the rain, he remembers another rainy day two years earlier when his wife, Asami, was slain by three former samurai, ostensibly in revenge for Ittō's execution of their young daimyō, but Ittō soon deduces that it is really a complex plot by the "Shadow" Yagyū clan, which controls the shōgun's spies and assassins, to frame Ittō for treason and take over the executioner's post. He winds up cutting down a senior member of the Yagyū and his men when they show up to finish him as well.

Now a wandering assassin-for-hire, Ittō takes a job from the chamberlain of a rural clan to kill the members of a conspiracy to assassinate the chamberlain's lord and replace him with their own preferred successor. The chamberlain plans to test Ittō, but a quick slash behind his back with his Dōtanuki sword dispatches the chamberlain's two men. The targets are in a remote mountain village that is home to hot-spring spa pools.

As Ittō pushes the baby cart, and Daigoro observes scenes of nature, such as a dog suckling her puppy, and two children singing a song and bouncing a ball, Ittō thinks back again to the time just after his wife was killed. He gave Daigoro a choice between a toy ball or the sword. If the child chose the ball, Ittō would put him to death so he could join his mother – which he secretly hopes for. Instead, the curious child reaches for the sword – he has chosen to take the path of the rōnin with his father, which Ittō describes as living like demons at the crossroads to hell.

The episode takes one more trip back to the past: Refusing to accept death, Ittō forces the leader of the "Shadow" Yagyū, Retsudo, to allow him to duel the clan's best swordsman with a promise that he and Daigoro will be permitted to become ronin if he wins. Ittō beheads the swordsman by strapping a mirror to Daigoro's forehead, allowing him to blind his opponent with sunlight.

Eventually, Ittō reaches the hot-spring village. He finds that the conspirators have hired a band of ronin who have taken over the town and are raping, looting, and pillaging. As his targets have not yet arrived, Ittō is forced to give up his sword and join several other travelers who have been taken hostage. The ronin leaders discuss killing Ittō and try to provoke him, but then decide to let him live if he will have sex with a fellow hostage, a prostitute, while they watch. The prostitute assumes a man with as much obvious dignity as Itto would never lower himself to point of sleeping with a prostitute and scoffs at the idea. However, Ittō steps forward and disrobes, because now that he lives a hell bound lifestyle and destined for the underworld (Meifumado), things like honor and self-respect no longer have any bearing on his life.

When Ittō finally reveals his true identity to the ronin after they meet with the conspirators, he pulls out various edged weapons hidden in the baby cart, including a naginata and a throwing dagger, and quickly slaughters the ronin in a gruesome, ruthless manner. A conspirator tries to shoot him with twin matchlock pistols, but Ittō quickly upturns the baby cart, which is revealed to be armored underneath, and when the gunman's pistols are empty, Ittō quickly leaps over the baby cart and brings his blade down on the man's forehead, splitting it in two. He then stops the final conspirator from fleeing and slices his chest open with his sword.

Ittō leaves the village. The prostitute, having developed feelings for him and his son, tries to follow, but Ittō makes a motion to cut the ropes on the bridge leading to town to stop her from following. He then quietly pushes the cart as he and Daigoro set off to find their next job.

== Cast ==
- Tomisaburo Wakayama as Ogami Ittō
- Akihiro Tomikawa as Ogami Daigoro
- Tomoko Mayama as Osen, the prostitute
- Fumio Watanabe as Yagyu Bizen-no-kami
- Keiko Fujita as Ogami Asami
- Reiko Kasahara as Madwoman
- Shigeru Tsuyuguchi as Yagyū Kurando
- Yūnosuke Itō as Yagyū Retsudo

== Release ==
Lone Wolf and Cub: Sword of Vengeance was released theatrically in Japan on 15 January 1972 where it was distributed by Toho. The film was released in the United States by Toho International with English subtitles and an 83-minute running time in August 1973.

=== Box office ===
The film earned ¥254.03 million in Japanese distributor rentals, making it the ninth highest-grossing Japanese film of 1972.

== See also ==
- List of Japanese films of 1972
