= Kayo Matsuo =

Japanese actress (born 1943)

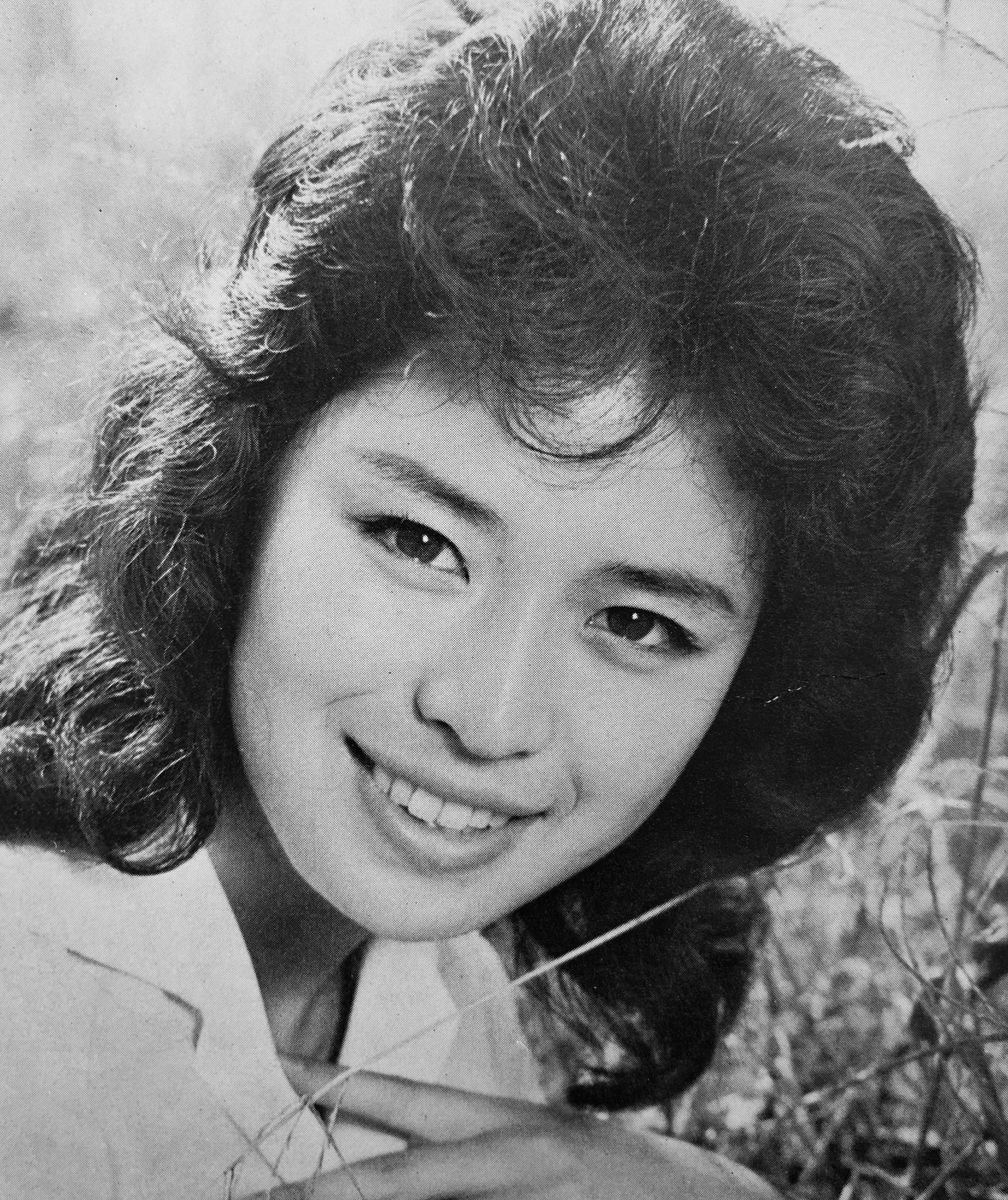
- Born: March 17, 1943 (age 83); Tokyo, Japan
- Occupation: Actress
- Years active: 1958–1995

Kayo Matsuo (Japanese: 松尾 嘉代, Hepburn: Matsuo Kayo; born March 17, 1943 in Tokyo, Japan) is a Japanese actress.

== Filmography ==
=== Films ===
- Endless Desire (1958)
- My Second Brother (1959) – Yoshiko Yasumoto
- High Teen Yakuza (1962) – Keiko Nakagawa
- Aoi sanmyaku (1963) – Kuko
- Hikaru umi (1963) – Eiko Asanuma
- Gate of Flesh (1964) – Mino
- Story of a Prostitute (1965)
- Tattooed Life (1965) – Oyuki
- Carmen from Kawachi (1966) – Yukie
- Fighting Elegy (1966) – Misako
- Ketto (1967) – Masae Fukui
- Tsumiki no hako (1968) – Mie Sasarinna
- Nemuri Kyoshiro 12: Akujo-gari (1969) – Rakka
- The Vampire Doll (1970) – Keiko Sagawa
- Lone Wolf and Cub: Baby Cart at the River Styx (1972) – Sayaka Yagyu
- Yamaguchi-gumi San-daime (1973) – Fumiko Fukayama
- Hissatsu Shikakenin Baian Arijigoku (1975) – Rin
- Aftermath of Battles Without Honor and Humanity (1979) – Satoko Ikenaga
- Nihon no Fixer (1979) – Masako Yamaoka
- Yami no karyudo (1979) – Oren
- The Battle of Port Arthur (1980) – Empress Shōken
- Shogun Assassin (1980) – Supreme Ninja
- Deathquake (1980) – Yūko Kawazu
- Imperial Navy (1981) – Suzukawa Geisha
- Good Luck Love (1981) – Mayumi Nakamura
- Secret of Summer (1982) – Yukie Munakata
- Seiha (1982) – Momoya Kawakami
- Kagi (1983) – Mubeko
- The Island Closest to Heaven (1984) – Teruko Katsuragi
- Tsuribaka Nisshi 4 (1991)
- Paris Fantasy (Gensō no Paris), 1992)
- Tsuribaka nisshi supesharu (1994) – Maiko Chīmama

=== Television ===
- Oshizamurai Kiichihōgan (1973–1974) – Kikuno
- Onihei Hankachō (1975) – Otaki
- Iki no Ii Yatsu (1987) – Tamayo Hasegawa
- Station (1995) – Reiko Maruyama
