= Lone Wolf and Cub: Baby Cart to Hades =

- Directed by: Kenji Misumi
- Screenplay by: Kazuo Koike
- Based on: A manga by Kazuo Koike and Goseki Kojima
- Produced by: Shintaro Katsu; Hisaharu Matsubara
- Starring: Tomisaburo Wakayama; Go Kato; Yuko Hama
- Cinematography: Chishi Makiura
- Edited by: Toshio Taniguchi
- Music by: Eiken Sakurai
- Production company: Katsu
- Distributed by: Toho
- Release date: 2 September 1972 (Japan)
- Running time: 89 minutes
- Country: Japan

Lone Wolf and Cub: Baby Cart to Hades (子連れ狼 死に風に向う乳母車, Kozure Ōkami: Shinikazeni mukau ubaguruma; "Wolf with Child in Tow: Perambulator Against the Winds of Death"), is the third in a series of six Japanese martial arts films based on the long-running Lone Wolf and Cub manga series about Ogami Ittō, a wandering assassin for hire who is accompanied by his young son, Daigoro.

== Plot ==
Ogami Ittō, the disgraced former shōgun's executioner or Kogi Kaishakunin, is traveling by river on a boat with his young son Daigoro floating behind in the baby cart. A young woman at the front of the boat, clearly distraught, accidentally drops a bundle into the water, which Daigoro retrieves for her. Ittō, draws his sword partway and notices in the reflection on the blade that some bamboo reeds are trailing the boat, meaning that Ittō is being followed by operatives of his mortal enemy, the Yagyū Clan. Later, as Daigoro is relieving himself in a bamboo glade, Ittō slices at several tall bamboo stalks, causing hidden ninja assassins to fall from their elevated perches and to be bloodily killed by him.

A group of four watari-kashi (wandering lower-class hired fighters, working from one daimyō to the next), are idling along the road at a rest stop. Hot and bored, they spy an attractive young woman and her mother being escorted by a servant. Three of them run to take advantage of the women, but one of their band, Kanbei, a rōnin (a samurai who has lost his retainership) and the more honorable of the four, remains. The three knock the escort unconscious and proceed to rape the two women. The servant regains consciousness and is furious when he sees the triad violating his mistresses. He attempts to beat them with his bamboo pole, but is slain by Kanbei, who also slays the two women in order to silence them. Kanbei makes his three companions draw straws, saying the one who draws the short straw will be killed in order to take the blame for the rapes and murders.

Ittō happens upon this grim scene as Kanbei is slaying the losing watari-kashi. Ittō kills the other two rapists when they attempt to attack him because he can speak to their crimes. Kanbei recognizes Ittō and requests a duel now that Ittō is involved. Ittō accepts, and they prepare to fight, but at the last second Ittō re-sheathes his sword and calls it a draw. Kanbei is left to ponder why fate will not let him die honorably as he would like.

At an inn, it turns out that the young woman from the boat is to be sold into prostitution. Her pimp tries to have his way with her, but accidentally bites the tip of his own tongue off while restraining her and the pimp dies from shock. The girl seeks refuge in Ittō's room, who steps in to protect her from the local officials. But the town's real authorities show up, the yakuza, led by a pistol-wielding woman named Torizo, from the Koshio clan. Ittō agrees to act as a substitute for the young woman and undergo buri-buri (literally "angrily"), a form of torture that involves the subject being hogtied and hung in the air and repeatedly dunked headfirst into a tub of water, then beaten to unconsciousness by men wielding thick rattan canes. Ittō endures the torture with his typical stoicism. This frees the young woman from becoming a prostitute.

Torizo asks and Ittō agrees to meet a one-armed man who turns out to be Miura Tatewaki, former first retainer of the Kakegawa clan, whom Ittō recognizes from the time he had to execute the insane daimyō Kakegawa Ujishige. Miura was forced to restrain the struggling daimyou to make him stay still, sacrificing his arm in the process to Ittō's precise killing stroke. Torizo is, in fact, Miura's own daughter, Miura Tori, who because of the taboo of her being a twin was secretly raised by the Koshio clan. The Miuras want Ittō to kill Sawatari Genba, who sold out the Kakegawa clan to become governor of the district of Totomi. He is also the man responsible for her sister's death and the fall of the Kakegawa clan and its 400 retainers.

Sawatari wants to hire Ittō to kill visiting minister Itakura, but he refuses. While giving the slip to Sawatari's retainers, Ittō is attacked by Yagyu ninjas, who have been following him. The next day, Ittō has to face the governor's personal bodyguards, one of whom is a sharpshooter and quick-draw artist who wields a pair of American revolvers. With the help of his young son Daigoro, who acts as a decoy, Ittō kills the sharpshooter, taking his pistols. The other bodyguard is dispatched in a sword duel.

Ittō's battle culminates in his facing the governor's army, perhaps 200 men, singlehandedly. For the first time, the baby cart is revealed as holding an entire arsenal of weaponry, including spears, daggers, a bullet-proof shield, and a small battery of guns. All of the governor's men are killed, as Ittō first kills half of them with the baby cart's firepower and the rest with his sword and other weapons. The governor is the last to die when Ittō, losing his sword as he falls down an embankment, takes out the sharpshooter's pistols and shoots him.

Word of the coming fight has been passed to neighboring districts, and the rōnin Kanbei appears just after Ittō has slain the governor, and again demands a duel. Though battle-weary, this time Ittō accepts. The fight is over in an instant: Ittō is sliced across his back, but Kanbei is mortally wounded, impaled on Ittō's Dōtanuki katana.

As Kanbei dies, he tells Ittō the story of why he became a rōnin: When his master's convoy was ambushed, Kanbei, seeing his forces outnumbered, seized an opportunity and ran ahead to attack the enemy head on, surprising them, and saving the lord's life. However, because he had left his lord's side, he was dishonored and expelled from the clan. When Kanbei asks what is the true "Way of the Warrior", and if he had done wrong by attacking, Ittō replies that Bushido is not to simply live or die but to live through death. He confirms that he would have acted just as Kanbei had. The dying Kanbei asks the former Kogi Kaishakunin to act as his "second" during his seppuku, which Ittō is honored to do.

As Ittō leaves, pushing the cart holding Daigoro, Torizo, who had been watching everything from a distance, begins to run after him. She is stopped by her men, who implore her not to approach Ittō, saying he is not human but a devil.

== Cast ==
- Tomisaburo Wakayama as Ogami Ittō
- Akihiro Tomikawa as Daigoro
- Go Kato as Kanbei
- Yuko Hamada as Torizo
- Isao Yamagata as Sawatari Genba

== Production ==
- Yoshinobu Nishioka - Art direction

== Release ==
Lone Wolf and Cub: Baby Cart to Hades was released theatrically in Japan on 2 September 1972 where it was distributed by Toho. An American version was released by Toho International with English subtitles in August 1974. It was later released with an English-language dub by Columbia Pictures under the title Lightning Swords of Death in August 1973.

The film was released to home video in its original Japanese version with English subtitles as Lone Wolf and Cub - Baby Cart to Hades by Samurai Cinema, a division of AnimEigo. An alternate version titled Lightning Swords of Death which was closer to the Columbia release was released on home video in 2007.

== Reception ==
In a contemporary review, Tony Rayns (Monthly Film Bulletin) stated that the film may resemble an art film to a Western audience where "Misumi and his writer are concerned to revalidate the samurai code every bit as earnestly as movies like Harakiri question it; the result aligns itself directly with those of, say, Mishima's book Sun and Steel." Rayns continued that Misumi's style is "typically Japanese" in its "static, slow, contemplative view of the action, reserving bravua effects for the moments of climax." and that "Though graphic, the violence is not presented exploitatively; any 'kicks' to be had are confined to the placid close-ups of a severed head or limb, the hideous/magnificent aftermath of violence."
