= Lone Wolf and Cub: Baby Cart in Peril =

- Japanese theatrical release poster
- Directed by: Buichi Saitō
- Screenplay by: Kazuo Koike
- Based on: A manga by Kazuo Koike and Goseki Kojima
- Produced by: Tomisaburo Wakayama; Hisaharu Matsubara
- Starring: Tomisaburo Wakayama; Yoichi Hayashi; Michie Azuma; Akihiro Tomikawa
- Cinematography: Kazuo Miyagawa
- Edited by: Toshio Taniguchi
- Music by: Eiken Sakurai
- Production company: Katsu Production
- Distributed by: Toho
- Release date: 30 December 1972 (Japan)
- Running time: 81 minutes
- Country: Japan

Lone Wolf and Cub: Baby Cart in Peril (子連れ狼 親の心子の心, Kozure Ōkami: Oya no kokoro ko no kokoro; literally "Wolf with Child in Tow: The Heart of a Parent, the Heart of a Child") is the fourth in a series of six Japanese martial arts films based on the long-running Lone Wolf and Cub manga series about Ogami Ittō, directed by Buichi Saitō.

The film has also been released as Shogun Assassin 3: Slashing Blades of Carnage, the second sequel to Shogun Assassin.

== Plot ==
Oyuki, a tattooed female assassin – the renegade member of a daimyō's personal bodyguard detail – is killing every man that is sent up against her. Along with her deadly use of the short blade, she strips to the waist while fighting to reveal elaborate tattoos on her chest and back. On her front is a kintarō grasping her left breast. A portrait of a mountain witch covers her back. She then cuts off her victims' topknots, or chonmage, which brings dishonor to the dead man and his family.

Ogami Ittō, the disgraced former shōgun's executioner, or Kogi Kaishakunin, is hired to kill Oyuki. He tracks down the tattoo artist, who explains that she was a "fine" woman who did not scream as he dug into her flesh with his needles.

Meanwhile, Ittō's 3-year-old son, Daigoro, has grown restless waiting by the baby cart his father uses to trundle him about in. He goes exploring and finds a pair of performing clowns on the street. When the clowns finish their performance, Daigoro follows them, hoping to see more. But the clowns shoo him away, saying it is time to go home. Now, Daigoro has wandered too far. He is lost, and has become separated from his father.

Agents of the Ogamis' mortal enemies, the Yagyū, are never far away. A procession of them, accompanied by the sound of gongs and loud shrieks, sends Daigoro into hiding. Ittō must give up his search rather than risk an entanglement with the men, so he travels on alone.

Daigoro spends days looking for his father, searching every temple in the countryside. After entering another temple, he sees a figure at the altar praying, but it is not his father. Rather, it is a man whom Daigoro immediately recognizes as someone who is unfriendly. The man sees something in Daigoro's eyes that alerts him to follow the boy when he leaves the temple.

Daigoro wanders into a grass field as it is being lit on fire by farmers to prepare the ground for next year's growing season. Unwittingly, he is surrounded by the flames, but Daigoro proves resourceful by burying himself in the mud in order to survive.

The man has been following behind and turns his sword on Daigoro, who raises a stick to defend himself, In that instant the man realizes Daigoro is not just any child, but the son of Ogami Ittō.

Ittō arrives pushing the baby cart, and the two ronin recognize each other. The man, it turns out is Gunbei Yagyū, the outcast son of Retsudo Yagyū. Gunbei and Itto had competed for the post of Shogun's executioner, and Gunbei's fierce swordsmanship surely would have won him the post, but in his over zealousness, he ends up pointing his sword at the Shogun, a taboo sword movement that costs him the job and makes him an outcast.

Ittō and Gunbei now have their rematch, but Ittō is much improved and is more than ready for Gunbei. With a swift stroke, he chops off Gunbei's right arm. Gunbei then begs Ittō to kill him, but he refuses, saying there is nothing to be gained from slaying a man who is already dead.

With Gunbei out of the way and father and son reunited, Ittō turns to finding the tattooed killer, Oyuki. He first stops at a settlement of street actors and other performers, of which Oyuki was said to be a member. He talks to the elder and hears more of her story, and it happens that the elder is Oyuki's father, who is opposed to her actions, and cooperates with Ittō.

Ittō finally locates Oyuki at an isolated hot spring and witnesses her in action against more vassals who have come to try to kill her. Then her nemesis, her former instructor who raped her and set her on her bloody vendetta, shows up with his flaming sword and blazing hypnotic eyes. But Oyuki is no longer held in his sway, and when she reveals her shocking tattoos to him, he is distracted and quickly killed by her.

Finally, Ittō and Oyuki must duel, and he makes quick work of her. She dies an honorable death, as Oyuki says, "without having to disrobe".

Retsudo Yagyū, meanwhile, has been playing politics. He manipulates a local daimyō into bringing in Ittō, but he is able to use the baby cart's various hidden weapons to escape from the compound and take the daimyō hostage. As Ittō is leaving the area with the daimyo, he is attacked by the Yagyū. The daimyō is killed by Yagyū musketeers and Ittō plunges headlong into battle with their many swordsmen, telling his son Daigoro that he is entering the "crossroads to hell". It is a fierce battle, ending with only Ittō and Retsudo in final combat. They trade sword blows and Retsudo gets a blade thrust into his right eye and Ittō a sword in his back. Ittō easily dispatches the swordsman who stabs him, but Retsudo gets away.

Daigoro finds Ittō, who commands him to pull the sword from his back. Despite being severely wounded, Ittō carries Daigoro to the cart and slowly pushes it away. Watching over the scene from a distance is the now one-armed Gunbei, who is happy to see the master swordsman live to fight another day. He vows someday to be the one who will dispatch Ittō to hell.

== Cast ==
- Tomisaburo Wakayama as Ogami Ittō
- Akihiro Tomikawa as Daigoro
- Yoichi Hayashi as Yagyū Gunbei
- Michie Azuma as Oyuki
- Asao Koike as Tokugawa Yoshinao
- Tatsuo Endō as Yagyū Retsudo
- So Yamamura as Gomune Jindayu
- Shin Kishida as Kitunezuka Enki

== Release ==
Lone Wolf and Cub: Baby Cart in Peril was released theatrically in Japan on December 30, 1972, where it was distributed by Toho.

The film was released to home video as Lone Wolf and Cub: Baby Cart in Peril by Samurai Cinema, a division of AnimEigo, Inc. on June 10, 1997.
