= Tomisaburo Wakayama =

Japanese actor (1929–1992)

Tomisaburō Wakayama
- Wakayama appearing as Ogami Ittō in the Lone Wolf and Cub movie series
- Born: Masaru Okumura; September 1, 1929; Chiba, Chiba Prefecture, Japan
- Died: April 2, 1992 (aged 62); Kyoto, Japan
- Other name: Jō Kenzaburō
- Occupation: Actor
- Years active: 1955–1992
- Spouse(s): Ginko (surname unknown; div. 1962); Reiko Fujiwara (m. 1964; div. 1965)
- Relatives: Shintaro Katsu (brother)

Tomisaburō Wakayama (若山 富三郎, Wakayama Tomisaburō; September 1, 1929 – April 2, 1992), born Masaru Okumura (奥村 勝), was a Japanese actor best known for playing Ogami Ittō, the scowling ronin warrior in the six Lone Wolf and Cub samurai films.

== Biography ==
Wakayama (his stage name) was born on September 1, 1929. Born in Chiba, he was brought to the Okumura family's ancestral home in Fukagawa, Tokyo at around two years of age, where he was raised. His father was Minoru Okumura (奥村 実), a noted kabuki performer and nagauta singer who went by the stage name Katsutōji Kineya (杵屋 勝東治), and the family as a whole were kabuki performers. He and his younger brother, Shintaro Katsu, followed their father in the theater. Wakayama tired of this; at the age of 13, he began to study judo, eventually achieving the rank of 4th dan black belt in the art.

In 1952, as part of the Azuma Kabuki troupe, Wakayama toured the United States of America for nine months. He gave up theater performance completely after his two-year term with the troupe was over. Wakayama taught judo until Toho recruited him as a new martial arts star in their jidaigeki movies, originally using the stage name "Jō Kenzaburō". He prepared for these movies by practicing other disciplines, including kenpō, iaidō, kendo, and bōjutsu. All this helped him for roles (now using the stage name "Wakayama Tomisaburō") in the television series The Mute Samurai, the 1975 television series Shokin Kasegi (The Bounty Hunter), and his most famous film role: Ogami Ittō, the Lone Wolf.

Wakayama went on to star in many films, performing in a variety of roles. It has been estimated that he appeared in between 250 and 500 films. His only roles in American movies were as a baseball coach in The Bad News Bears Go to Japan (1978) and as a yakuza boss, Sugai, in Ridley Scott's Black Rain (1989) that delivers a memorable English monologue that becomes a defining moment for the film, and the film's title.

Wakayama died of acute heart failure on April 2, 1992, in a hospital in Kyoto. He was survived by a son, Kiichirō Wakayama (若山 騎一郎) born in 1964, also an actor.

== Personal life ==
=== Marriages and family ===
Wakayama was married twice. On 26 March 1960, his eldest daughter, Kayoko Okumura, was born to his first wife, Ginko. However, after a period of separation, the couple divorced in late 1962. From early childhood (around the age of one and a half), Kayoko was raised by her paternal grandparents, Kineya Katsutōji and his wife. At age 16, after dropping out of high school, she joined Katsu Production upon the recommendation of her uncle, Shintaro Katsu, and made her acting debut in 1977.

In August 1962, shortly before his first divorce was finalized, Wakayama transferred to Daiei Film, where he met Daiei actress Reiko Fujiwara through his younger brother, Shintaro Katsu. Wakayama fell in love with her at first sight, leading to a romantic relationship. The two married on 6 January 1964, following the completion of his divorce. Later that year, they had a son, Kiichiro Wakayama. However, due to financial hardship caused by Wakayama's spending habits, the marriage ended in divorce in 1965. Despite Wakayama's attempts to persuade her to stay, Fujiwara declined and raised Kiichiro as a single mother.

== Filmography ==
=== Film ===
Wakayama appeared in the following films, amongst others.

=== 1955–1959 ===
- Banba no Chûtarô (1955) - Banba no Chutaro
- Uta matsuri mangetsu tanuki-gassen (1955)
- Gyakushu orochimaru (1955) - Toyama Yunosuke
- Silver Snake Iwashiya (1956)
- Yotsuya kaidan (1956) - Iemon Tamiya
- Ningyô Sashichi torimonochô: Yôen roku shibijin (1956) - Ningyo Sashichi
- Yôun Satomi kaikyoden (1956) - Inuzuka Shino
- Ningyô Sashichi torimonochô: Ôedo Ushimitsudoki (1957) - Ningyo Sashichi
- Ningyô Sashichi torimonochô: Hanayome Satsujinma (1957) - Ningyo Sashichi
- Kanhasshû ken kajin (1958)
- Ningyô Sashichi torimonochô: Ukiyoburo no Shibijin (1958) - Ningyo Sashichi
- Ningyô Sashichi torimonochô: Koshimoto Irezumi Shibijin (1958) - Ningyo Sashichi
- Doto no taiketsu (1959)
- Fukaku hichô (1959)
- Fukaku hichô: kanketsuhen (1959)
- Chiyari musô (1959)
- Hibari torimonochô: furisode koban (1959)
- Yukinojô henge (1959)
- Hayate monzaburo (1959)
- Rage (1959)

=== 1960–1969 ===
- Hibari no mori no ishimatsu (1960) - Shimizu No Jirocho - Boss Of The Tokaido
- Tenpô rokkasen - Jigoku no hanamichi (1960)
- Jirochô kesshôki: Nagurikomi kôjinyama (1960) - Okita Soji
- Tenryu haha koi gasa (1960)
- Shoretsu shinsengumi - bakumatsu no doran (1960) - Okita Soji
- Oja kissa (1960)
- Ninkyo Nakasendo (1960) - Omasa
- Hibari Juhachiban Benten Kozo (1960)
- Hachisu chikemuri gasa (1961)
- Yami ni warau tekkamen (1961)
- Tekka Daimyo ("Lord of Steel Heart") (1961)
- Ghost of Oiwa (1961)
- Megitsune henge (1961)
- Kengo tengu matsuri (1961) - Iishiro Shurinosuke
- Kaidan Oiwa no borei (1961) - Tamiya Iemon
- Charinko kaido (1961)
- Kisaragi musô ken (1962) - Hayatomasa Tachibana
- Seizoroi kanhasshu (1962)
- The Tale of Zatoichi Continues (1962)- Nagisa no Yoshirō (credited as Jō Kenzaburō)
- Ninja 1 (1962) - Oda Nobunaga
- Love for a Mother (1962)
- Shinsengumi shimatsuki (1963) - Isami Kondô (credited as Jō Kenzaburō)
- Teuchi (1963) - Shindo Genjiro
- Kaidan onibi no numa (1963) - Saburôta Nishina
- Ninja 2 (1963) - Oda Nobunaga
- Ninja 3 (1963) - Oda Nobunaga
- Maiko to ansatsusha (1963)
- Yôsô (1963) - Prime Minister
- Enter Kyōshirō Nemuri the Swordman (1963) - Chen Sun (credited as Jō Kenzaburō)
- Hana no kodokan (1963)
- Zatoichi and the Chest of Gold (1964) - Jushiro
- Shinobi no mono: Zoku Kirigakure Saizô (1964) - Sanada Yukimura
- Meiji taitei goichidaiki (1964) - Soldier charging Chinese fortress
- Sleepy Eyes of Death: Sword of Seduction (1964) - Chen Sun (credited as Jō Kenzaburō)
- Ninja 4 (1964) - Sanada Yukimura
- Gaijin bôchi no ketto (1964)
- Kojiki Taishō (1964)
- Virgin Witnessed (1966) - Gyôshun
- A Brave Generous Era (1966)
- Ôtazune mono shichinin (1966)
- Fraternal Honor: Three Brothers of Kanto (1966) - Akoshima Isamu
- Bakuchiuchi ("The Gambler) (1967)
- Zoku Toseinin (1967) - Sakamoto
- Toseinin (1967) - Hirose
- Hokkai yûkyôden (1967)
- Choueki juhachi-nen: kari shutsugoku (1967)
- Choueki juhachi-nen (1967)
- Bakuchi uchi (1967) - Ozeki Isamu
- Zenka mono (1968)
- Kaettekita gokudo (1968) - Shimamura Seikichi
- Ikasama bakuchi (1968)
- Red Peony Gambler (1968) - Torakichi Kumasaka
- Jinsei-gekijô: Hishakaku to kiratsune (1968)
- Red Peony Gambler: Gambler's Obligation (1968) - Torakichi Kumazaka
- Bakuto retsuden (1968) - Adachi Sanji
- Yôen dokufu-den hannya no ohyaku (1968) - Boss Minokichi of Otowa
- Otoko no shobu: byakko no tetsu (1968)
- Kyôdai jingi gyakuen no sakazuki (1968)
- Heitai gokudo (1968)
- Ballad of Murder (1968)
- Gokudo (1968) - Shimamura Seikichi
- Wicked Priest (1968) - Mikuni Shinkai
- Daigashi (1968)
- Bakuchi-uchi: Socho tobaku (1968) - Tetsuo Matsuda
- Nunnery Confidential (1968)
- Wicked Priest 2: Ballad of Murder (1968)
- Red Peony Gambler: The Flower Cards Game (1969) - Torakichi Kumasaka
- Tabi ni deta gokudo (1969) - Shimamura Seikichi
- Quick-draw Okatsu (1969) - Bounty hunter
- Shokin kasegi (1969) - Shikoru Ichibei
- Hissatsu bakuchi-uchi (1969)
- Red Peony Gambler: Biography of a Gambling Hall (1969)
- Memoir of Japanese Assassins (1969)
- Gonin no Shôkin Kasegi (1969) - Shikoro Ichibei
- Tosei-nin Retsuden (1969) - Kaku
- Boss (1969) - Sakata Yoshinobu
- Nihon boryoku-dan: Kumicho (1969) - Miyahara
- Matteita gokudo (1969) - Shimamura Seikichi
- Gorotsuki butai (1969)
- Gendai yakuza: Yotamono no okite (1969)
- Chôeki san kyôdai (1969)
- Wicked Priest 3: A Killer's Pilgrimage (1969) - Shinkai

=== 1970–1979 ===
- Red Peony Gambler: Oryu's Return (1970) - Torakichi Kumasaka
- Bakuchi-uchi: Nagaremono (1970) - Yoshii Yusaku
- Nippon dabi katsukyu (1970)
- Saigo no tokkôtai (1970)
- Blind Yakuza Monk (1970) - Dr. Mitamura
- Thugs of Shinjuku (1970) - Senior yakuza at funeral (uncredited)
- Shiruku hatto no ô-oyabun: Chobi-hige no kuma (1970)
- Shiruku hatto no ô-oyabun (1970)
- Shin Abashiri Bangaichi: Fubuki no Hagure Okami (1970)
- Sengo hiwa, hoseki ryakudatsu (1970)
- Nihon boryoku-dan: Kumicho kuzure (1970)
- Hakurai jingi: Kapone no shatei (1970)
- Gokudo kyojo tabi (1970) - Shimamura Seikichi
- Gokudo Kamagasaki ni kaeru (1970) - Shimamura Seikichi
- Wicked Priest 4: The Killer Priest Comes Back (1970) - Shinkai
- Underground Syndicate (1970)
- Sympathy for the Underdog (1971) - Yonabaru - Koza downtown boss
- A Boss with the Samurai Spirit (1971) - Capone
- Bakuchi-uchi: Inochi-huda (1971) - Kobayashi Kanji
- Wicked Priest 5: Blood on the Commandments (1971)
- Nihon yakuza-den: Sôchiyô e no michi (1971) - Torakichi Ohmatsu
- Red Peony Gambler: You are Dead (1971) - Torakichi Kumasaka
- Kaoyaku (1971) - Hoshino
- Nippon akuninden (1971) - Kumai
- Nihon aku nin den (1971)
- Kizudarake no seishun (1971) - Mihashi Tetsuo
- Boryokudan sai buso (1971)
- Bakuto kirikomi-tai (1971) - Yano
- Akû oyabûn tai daigashî (1971)
- Red Peony Gambler: Execution of Duty (1972)
- Lone Wolf and Cub: Sword of Vengeance (1972) - Ogami Ittō
- Kizu darake jinsei furui do de gonzansu (1972)
- Cherry Blossom Fire Gang (1972) - Master Kofusai Donju
- Lone Wolf and Cub: Baby Cart at the River Styx (1972) - Ogami Ittō
- Gokudo makari touru (1972) - Shimamura Seikichi
- Lone Wolf and Cub: Baby Cart to Hades (1972) - Ogami Ittō
- Kînagashî hyâkunîn (1972)
- Shôkin kubi: Isshun Hachi-nin Giri (1972) - Shikoro Ichibei
- Lone Wolf and Cub: Baby Cart in Peril (1972) - Ogami Ittō
- Nihon Aku Nin Den: Jigoku No Michizure (1972)
- Bakuchi-uchi Gaiden (1972)
- Sakura no Daimon (1973)
- Lone Wolf and Cub: Baby Cart in the Land of Demons (1973) - Ogami Itto
- Kamagasaki gokudo (1973) - Shimamura Seikichi, movie star
- Lone Wolf and Cub: White Heaven in Hell (1974) - Ogami Itto
- Gokudo VS Mamushi (1974)
- The Rapacious Jailbreaker (1974) - Okada
- New Battles Without Honor and Humanity (1974) - Aoki Naotake
- ESPY (1974) - Ulrov
- Gokudo VS furyô banchô (1974) - Shimamura Seikichi
- Gotô hoka sâtsujin shû (1975)
- Bôryoku kinmyaku (1975)
- Yukâi na gokudo (1976)
- The Devil's Ballad (1977) - Inspector Isokawa
- Devil's Bouncing Ball Song (1977) - Tatsuo Honda
- Sugata Sanshiro (1977) - Murai
- Torakku yarô: Otoko ippiki momojirô (1977)
- The Bad News Bears Go to Japan (1978) - Coach Shimizu
- Phoenix (1978) - Sarutahaiko, General of the Yamatai
- Oh My Son (1979) - Shuzo Kawase
- Distant Tomorrow (1979) - Iwasa

=== 1980–1989 ===
- Chichi yo haha yo! (1980) - Asakawa Senjo
- Shogun Assassin (1980) - Lone Wolf
- Seishun no mon ("The Gate of Youth") (1981) - Ryugoro Hanawa
- Flames of Blood (1981) - Seihachi
- Makai Tenshō ("Samurai Reincarnation") (1981) - Lord Tajima no Kami Munenori Yagyu
- Moeru yusha (1981) - Goro Kaji
- The Shootout (1982) - Yabuki
- Conquest (1982) - Tsuyoshi Gonno
- Irezumi: Spirit of Tattoo (1982) - Kyogoro / the Tatto Artist
- Shōsetsu Yoshida gakkō (1983) - Bukichi Miki
- Hakujasho (1983) - Ekai Kanamishima
- Theater of Life (1983) - Kiratsune
- Shura no mure (1984)
- Story of the Yamashita Boy (1985) - Yamashita Taizo, Cho's father
- A Promise (1986) - Detective Tagami
- Michi (1986) - Naokichi Sakura
- Shinran: Shiroi michi ("Shinran: Path to Purity") (1987) - Homen
- Daireikai: Shindara dou naru (1989)
- Shaso (1989) - Kazuo Otagaki
- Black Rain (1989) - Sugai Kunio
- Tanba Tetsuro no daireikai shindara dounaru (1989) - God

=== 1990 ===
- Jotei: Kasuga no tsubone (1990)
- Checkmate (1991) - Sanae Mitamura

=== Television ===
- Oshizamurai Kiichihōgan (1973-1974) - Kiichihōgan
- Akuma no Yoūna Aitsu (1975) - Detective Shirato
- Shokin Kasegi (1975) - Shikoro Ichibei
- Tsūkai! Kōchiyama Sōshun (1975–76) - Tōyama Kinsirō
- Fumō Chitai (1979) - Ichizo Daimon
- Ōoku (1983) - Tokugawa Ieyasu
- Kozure Ōkami Meifumadō no Shikyakunin Hahakoishi Daigoro Zetsushou (1989) - Yagyū Retsudō
