= Yosuke Amemiya =

Contemporary Japanese artist

Yosuke Amemiya (雨宮 庸介, Amemiya Yōsuke; born March 22, 1975, in Ibaragi Prefecture) is a Japanese contemporary artist.

== Biography ==
Yosuke Amemiya graduated from Department of Oil Painting in Tama Art University.

== Exhibitions ==
Yosuke Amemiya participated in solo and group exhibitions in Japan and around the world, including Netherlands Media Art Institute, The Living Art Museum, Ueno Royal Museum, Mori Art Museum, Bangkok Art and Culture Centre,
