= Mamiya Rinzō =

Japanese explorer (1775–1844)

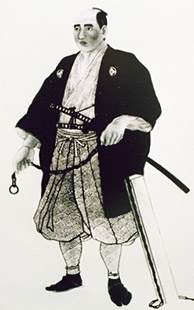
Mamiya Rinzō

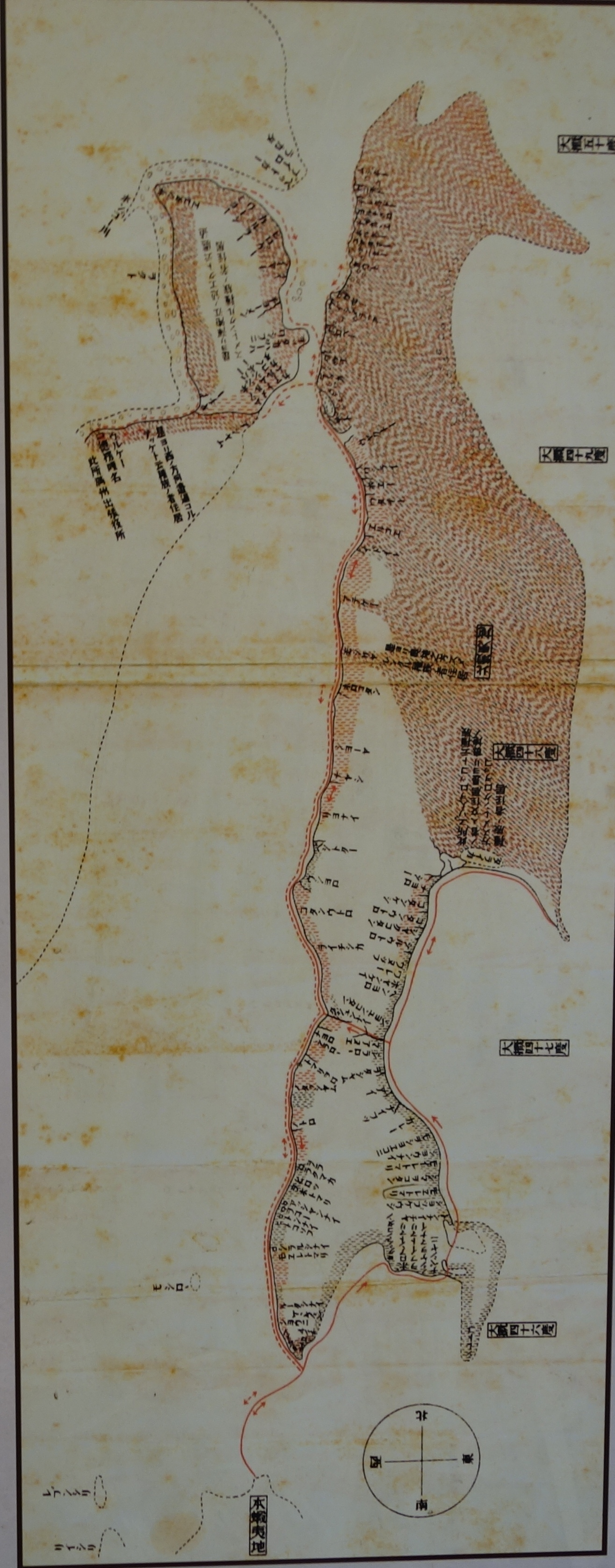
Map of Sakhalin and Lower Amur, compiled by Mamiya Rinzo in 1810

Mamiya Rinzō (間宮 林蔵; 1775 – 13 April 1844) was a Japanese explorer of the late Edo period. He is best known for his exploration of Karafuto, now known as Sakhalin. He mapped areas of northeast Asia then unknown to Japanese.

== Biography ==
Mamiya was born in 1775 in Tsukuba District, Hitachi Province, in what is now Tsukubamirai, Ibaraki Prefecture. Later in life he would become an undercover agent for the Tokugawa shogunate. He is best known for his exploration and mapping of Sakhalin (known to the Japanese as 樺太, Karafuto), which resulted in his discovery that Sakhalin was indeed an island and not connected to the Asian continent, although this had already been documented by Jean-François de La Pérouse in 1787, who charted most of the Strait of Tartary. The strait would later be named after him in Japan as the Mamiya Strait.

In 1785 Japanese explorers almost reached the Strait of Tartary to the west, Cape Patience to the east and Urup in the Kurils. In 1808 Mamiya sailed up the east coast and Matsuda Denjuro up the west coast. From near Cape Patience, Mamiya crossed the mountains to join Matsuda. The next year Mamiya sailed into the mouth of the Amur River and reached a Chinese trading post.

In 1828, he became a subordinate of Sadayuki Muragaki, the accounting magistrate, and investigated various parts of the country in secret for the shogunate, grasped the reality of smuggling in the Sekishu Hamada clan, and reported it to Sadakazu Yabe, the magistrate of Osaka town. He also engaged in activities such as leading to the arrest of the suspects (Takeshima Incident). Also, the Siebold Incident occurred in the same year.

In 1852 Mamiya's maps were published in Europe by Philipp Franz von Siebold.

Although Japan believed that Mamiya had no child, it was announced in 2002 that he had had a daughter with an Ainu woman, and their descendants were living in Hokkaido. He also had a son, Rinzo Mamiya, who was “Yoshi”, adopted by the Michishita family to carry on their namesake. The son, Rinzo had 3 sons: Tatsuzo, Senkichi and Yosaburo, and 3 daughters: who married Torisu, Yamaguchi and Nakamura. Yosaburo Michishita emigrated to America where his name was truncated to Mita. His 2 sons Naoto and Yoshiyo carried that name forward.

Naoto married Kimiye Tanaka and had one daughter, Louise. Yoshiyo married Ritsu Kaneta and had one daughter, Kathryn. Ironically, there was no male child to carry on the Mita name.

== In popular culture ==
Mamiya is portrayed as one of the two main villains in the manga series Shin Kozure Okami (New Lone Wolf and Cub). In this version, he is the chief henchman of Matsudaira Nobutsuna (and his natural son) and a master of disguise who assumes different identities after murdering the original persons. He is also possibly even more ruthless that Matsudaira, subverting various ninja groups for his own use and using opium as a means of ensnaring and controlling various people, including the Shogun. While Mamiya's historical explorations are mentioned, in this version they have been for a more malign purpose than mere exploration.

Graphic novel writer Sean Michael Wilson featured Mamiya in a biography released as a graphic novel ("Mamiya's Maps: A Samurai Explores Sakhalin").

== See also ==
- 12127 Mamiya
- Nikolai Rezanov
- Philipp Franz von Siebold
- Sakhalin
- Strait of Tartary
- Cape Sōya

== Sources ==
- Derek Hayes, Historical Atlas of the North Pacific, 2001
