= Chris Amemiya =

American geneticist

- Education: Purdue University; Texas A&M University
- Occupation: Geneticist

Chris Amemiya is an American geneticist. He is a professor in the department of molecular cell biology at the University of California, Merced.

In 2017, Amemiya was named a fellow of the American Association for the Advancement of Science.
