= Lone Wolf and Cub: Baby Cart at the River Styx =

- Japanese film poster
- Directed by: Kenji Misumi
- Screenplay by: Kazuo Koike
- Based on: A manga by Kazuo Koike and Goseki Kojima
- Produced by: Shintaro Katsu; Hisaharu Matsubara
- Starring: Tomisaburo Wakayama; Kayo Matsuo; Akiji Kobayashi
- Cinematography: Chishi Makiura
- Edited by: Toshio Taniguchi
- Music by: Eiken Sakurai
- Production company: Katsu
- Distributed by: Toho
- Release date: 27 April 1972 (Japan)
- Running time: 85 minutes
- Country: Japan

Lone Wolf and Cub: Baby Cart at the River Styx (子連れ狼 三途の川の乳母車, Kozure Ōkami: Sanzu no kawa no ubaguruma; literally "Wolf with Child in Tow: Perambulator of the River of Sanzu") is the second in a series of six Japanese martial arts films based on the long-running Lone Wolf and Cub manga series about Ogami Ittō, a wandering assassin for hire who is accompanied by his young son, Daigoro.

== Plot ==
Ogami Ittō, the disgraced former executioner, (the Kogi Kaishakunin to the Shōgun), is now living off the land with his three-year-old son Daigoro, traveling the countryside as a hired assassin. Pushing his son in a baby cart, he stops at a bathhouse looking for a room and a bath and is eagerly welcomed by a young woman. However, the manager of the bathhouse views Ittō as a dirty vagabond and scolds the young woman for letting him enter. Overhearing this, Ittō goes to the baby cart and retrieves a bundle and hands it to the manager for safe keeping. It is 500 gold pieces, earned from a recent contract killing. The manager's tone quickly changes, but when he tries to wash Daigoro's feet, the boy kicks water at the man and tromps across the floor, leaving wet footprints behind him.

Ittō's activities are being watched closely by the Kurokawa spy clan of shinobi-class ninja, which have fallen in with Ittō's nemesis, the Shadow Yagyū. They report on his activities to Sayaka, head of the Akari Yagyū clan of female assassins. But the Kurokawa are unsure that the women are up to the task of killing Ittō. Sayaka laughs confidently and tells the Kurokawas' leader to send their best man into the room. She then orders that he to try to exit. He tries by grappling onto the ceiling, but the female assassins set upon him and make short work of his efforts, hacking off his ears, fingers, arms, and legs, leaving the swordsman a writhing heap of just a torso and head before he is finally finished off.

Ittō, meanwhile, is hired by a clan that specializes in making indigo dye and has a secret process. One of the clan plans to sell the secret to the Shōgun. Ittō must kill him. The turncoat will be escorted by the three Hidari brothers, each a master of a deadly weapon: the iron claw, the flying mace, and a pair of armored gloves.

As he travels to the job, Ittō encounters three groups of female assassins. The first is disguised as an acrobat troupe that turns deadly as their gymnastic moves are combined with blades and turned against Ittō. Next, he encounters a pair of women who, with blades on their straw hats, throw the blades at Ittō. Finally, some women washing vegetables by the river turn out to also be assassins and the daikons they are washing are now wielded as weapons. Ittō quickly dispatches them all.

He encounters Sayaka, who captures him, his son, and the baby cart in a thick net. Ittō cuts his way out and engages in a sword duel with her. He delivers what should be a disabling blow to her ankles, but the woman jumps straight up out of her kimono to reveal a tight-fitting body suit. She runs away, bizarrely jogging backwards while keeping him constantly in her line of sight.

The Kurokawa clan are waiting for Ittō. He sees them and puts together his naginata (disguised as railing on the baby cart) and gives the baby cart a shove toward the waiting clan. Daigoro, still in the cart, activates blades hidden inside the cart's rolling axles, which slice off the feet of several of the clan. A fierce battle ensues, and Ittō is injured before he has silenced them all.

Weary from the endless fighting, Ittō struggles along the road and eventually finds shelter in a shack. Daigoro, seeing that his father needs his help, must do what he can. Unable to carry river water in his tiny hands, Daigoro transports it in his mouth. He spits what he is able to carry between his father's lips. For food, Daigoro finds some rice cakes given as an offering to a Jizo statue and takes them to his father, leaving his vest in exchange.

Ittō recovers and finds that his son is missing. Daigoro has been taken by the Kurokawa and Sayaka and is now tied up and suspended over a deep water well. If Ittō attacks, they will let go of the rope and Daigoro will plunge to his death. Daigoro lets his sandal drop into the well, giving his father a gauge of how far it is to the bottom. Ittō makes his move as the rope unspools, stopping it just in time. He slowly pulls up his son. Sayaka watches silently and makes no move to engage his considerable swordsmanship, perhaps to honor the devotion of a father to his child.

Ittō later finds himself aboard the same ship carrying the three Hidari brothers. Ittō watches silently as members of the indigo-dye clan try to kill the Hidaris, but are bloodily eliminated one-by-one. Another clan member sets the ship ablaze in an attempt to kill the Hidaris, but the three easily escape the fire, jumping into the sea. Ittō tosses Daigoro and the baby cart into the water, the cart easily floating as he pushes it while swimming toward shore.

Sayaka has followed Ittō and his son onto the ship and is in the water with them as the ship burns. She tries to kill Ittō, but she is quickly disarmed. All three find shelter, but they are now cold. Ittō removes his and Daigoro's wet garments and turns on Sayaka, tearing off her clothes. He does not intend to rape her. Instead, he is seeking to get her out of her own cold, wet clothing, while clinging to her and Daigoro. "Three people are warmer than two", he unemotionally explains. She considers taking his sword and killing him, but the cozy, now warming scene, with Daigoro sitting between them and playfully fondling her breast, makes her abandon the plan.

On a vast area of sand dunes, the Hidari brothers are at the head of a caravan of men carrying a palanquin with the turncoat indigo expert riding inside. The brother with the iron claw runs forward and thrusts his claw into the sand, which boils up with blood. There are men hiding in dunes, as he digs his claw into the sand several more times, each time creating a pool of blood and pulling up a hiding swordsman by his head. The rest of the hidden men emerge from the sand to fight, but the three brothers easily dispatch them all.

Ittō now awaits, alone, atop a large dune. Each brother is killed by him in a high-pressure spray of blood, with the last brother eliminated with a lethal strike along his throat, a cut that sprays arterial blood in a fine mist while making a sound like the "howling of the wind". The final Hidari brother says that such a fabled finishing stroke is called the "Mogaribue", wishing that the sound had come from one of his own victims. Instead, it is now coming from his own neck as his life slowly drains away.

Ittō approaches the palanquin holding the indigo expert and quickly finishes him before gathering up Daigoro and setting off again. They are now out of the desert and on a coastal trail, followed closely by Sayaka. Aware of her presence, Ittō stops the cart, looking straight ahead while holding out his outstretched dotanuki blade. Sayaka is holding a katana. Ittō stands quietly still, waiting, until he hears the sound of Sayaka dropping the blade. She realizes that she can never defeat the Shōgun's one-time master executioner.

== Cast ==
- Tomisaburo Wakayama as Ogami Ittō
- Akihiro Tomikawa as Ogami Daigoro
- Kayo Matsuo as Yagyu Sayaka
- Akiji Kobayashi as Ozuno, Leader of the Kurokuwa Group
- Minoru Ōki as Tenma Hidari, Master of Death 2
- Shin Kishida as Kuruma Hidari, Master of Death 3

== Release ==
Lone Wolf and Cub: Baby Cart at the River Styx was released theatrically in Japan on 22 April 1972 where it was distributed by Toho. An English-language dubbed version of the film was released by New World Pictures on November 11, 1980. The film is heavily altered with a 90-minute running time.

The film was released on home video in the United States in its original form in Japanese with English subtitles as Lone Wolf and Cub - Baby Cart at the River Styx by Samurai Cinema, a division of AnimEigo Inc. The 1980 version was released to home video by AnimEigo in 2006.
