= Dōtanuki =

Japanese school of swordsmiths

Dōtanuki (同田貫) is a name of a Japanese school of swordsmiths from Zudanuki(a.k.a. Doudanuki) Kikuchi district, Higo province who produced swords in the Bizen tradition during the feudal period of Japan.

== Dotanuki School ==
The Dotanuki school evolved in Higo Province with its ancestry going back to the famous "Enju Kunimura" (延寿 国村). Enju Kunimura founded the Higo Enju school in approximately 1305. Kunimura was born in Yamato province to the swordsmith Hiromura. He moved to Yamashiro province, became a student of Rai Kuniyuki, and later married Kuniyuki's daughter. Kunimura then moved to Higo and founded the Enju school. There are only six blades by Kunimura known to exist.

The Dotanuki school emerged in the small Higo village of Dotanuki in the mid-16th century, following the decline of the Higo Enju school in the latter part of the Koto period. The Dotanuki school founder is said to be Dotanuki Masakuni, he was called Oyama Kozuke no Suke and his original signature was Nobuyoshi. The famous general Katō Kiyomasa honored Masakuni with one character of his name, and from that point onward Nobuyoshi was known as Masakuni. However, the majority of his works are only signed "Dotanuki Kozuke no Suke".

Dotanuki swords quickly gained great popularity among the warrior class due to their superior cutting ability. The Dotanuki smiths cared little for aesthetics, but instead focused on strength, sharpness, and durability in the field. They were renowned for producing blades which would endure the harshest conditions, the most difficult battlefield situations and survive to return to battle day after day, year after year.

== Fictional references ==
The dōtanuki has appeared in several entertainment outlets, featured as a blade wider and thicker than any normal build of katana. Ogami Ittō in the manga Lone Wolf and Cub had a dōtanuki (using the spelling 胴太貫 “torso–thick–penetrate”) as his principal weapon. The katana named Gassan in Soulcalibur II and Soulcalibur III is a dōtanuki. Gassan is wielded by Heishiro Mitsurugi in Soulcalibur II.

Many works of historical fiction write dōtanuki with different characters as 胴田貫 (roughly "torso–paddy–penetrate"), with a folk etymology claiming it is because when used to cut the torso of a cadaver lying down in a paddy, the sword would pierce right through it and into the field. This name and story apparently originated in fiction, as they are not found in any historical manuals or catalogues.
