= Goroku Amemiya =

Japanese photographer

Goroku Amemiya (雨宮 五六, Amemiya Goroku; 1886–1972) was a Japanese photographer.
