= Remi Hirano =

Japanese chef & TV personality (born 1947)

- 平野 レミ
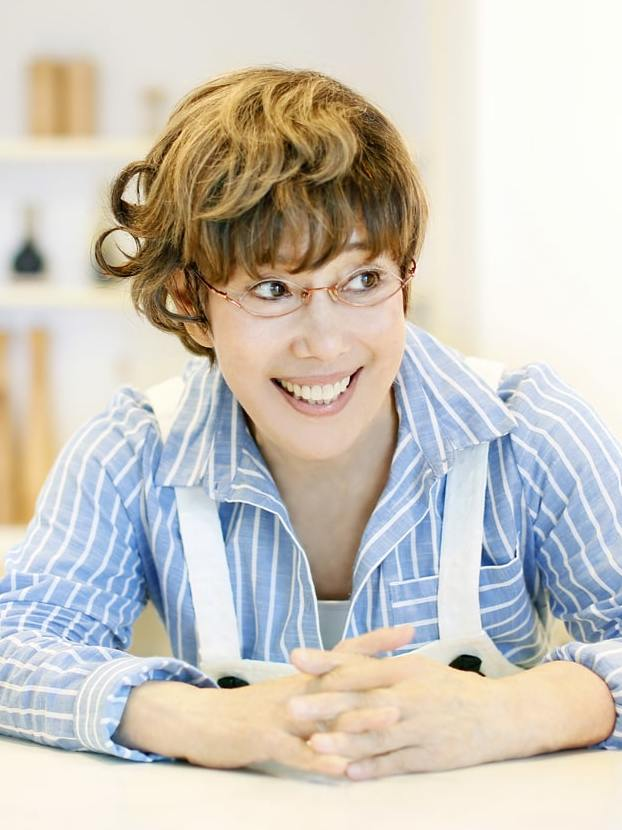
- 2018
- Born: March 21, 1947 (age 78); Taitō, Tokyo, Japan
- Education: Tokyo Metropolitan Ueno High School; Bunka Gakuin
- Occupations: Chef, TV personality, chanson singer
- Spouse: Makoto Wada (m. 1972)
- Relatives: Imao Hirano (father); Henry Pike Bowie (grandfather); Sho Wada (eldest son); Juri Ueno (eldest daughter); Asuka Wada (second daughter)
- Website: remy.jp

Remi Hirano (平野 レミ, Hirano Remi; born March 21, 1947, in Taitō, Tokyo, Japan) is a Japanese chef, TV personality, and chanson singer. Her father is French-American-Japanese writer Imao Hirano. Her husband is illustrator Makoto Wada. Her eldest son is Sho Wada, member of the band Triceratops, and whose wife is the actress Juri Ueno. The wife of her second son is chef and model Asuka Wada. Her grandfather is Japanese art historian and jurist Henry Pike Bowie.

== Filmography ==
=== TV appearances ===
| Year | Title | Network | Notes |
|---|---|---|---|
| 1970 | Neru ni wa Hayai Don to Ike | NTV | |
| 1972 | Kankonsōsai-ya | TV Asahi | Episode 2 |
| 1989 | Yuri Osawa no YūYū Wide | TBS Radio | |
| | Matthew's Best Hit TV | TV Asahi | |
| | Hadaka no Shōnen | TV Asahi | |
| | Kyō no Ryōri | NHK E TV | |
| | Asadesu | KBC | |
| 2015 | Jushin Ryō no Hitobito | NHK G TV, NHK E TV, NHK BS1, NHK BS Premium | |

=== Commercials ===
| Title | Notes |
|---|---|
| Kobayashi Pharmaceutical "Ara Colon" | |
| JUSCO | |
| Shiseido Actea Heart | |
| Nagatanien "Buta Kimchi Harusame no Moto 'Moyashi Dake de'", "Osuimono" | |
| Morinaga & Company "Remi Hirano to DJ Koo no 'Ryōri wa Imagination!'" | |
| Kelloggs "Remi Hirano no Kami Waza! 1-bu Cooking? Bussashi Gurachii" | |

== Discography ==
=== Singles ===
| Year | Title | Notes |
|---|---|---|
| 1970 | "Yūwaku no Bayon" | |
| 1971 | "Chot to ki ni Naru Lock" | |
| 1972 | "Ashita no Tabi" | |
| 1972 | "Gon! Gon!" | |

=== Albums ===
| Year | Title | Notes |
|---|---|---|
| 1988 | Kika Sete yo: Chanson do Remi | |
| 2006 | Watashi no Tabi | |

=== Compilation albums ===
| Year | Title | Notes |
|---|---|---|
| 1976 | Ame Mori Tera no Oshō-san | |

== Bibliography ==
| Year | Title | Notes |
|---|---|---|
| 1977 | Do Remi no Komori Uta | |
| 1986 | Remi Hirano Ryōri Taikai | |
| 1992 | Remi Hirano Ryōri Parade | |
| 1995 | Remi Hirano no Apron Techō | |
| 1996 | Remi Hirano no Umai Mono Kyōshitsu | |
| 1997 | Egao ga Gochisō | |
| 1998 | Remi Hirano no Tsukutte Shiawase Tabete Shiawase | |
| 1999 | Remi Hirano no Gochisō Recipe | |
| 1999 | Remi Hirano Genkijirushi no Okazu-ya-san | |
| 2000 | Remi Hirano Ikken gōka-fū | |
| 2000 | Remi Hirano no Nantettatte, Uchi no Gohan ga Ichiban! | |
| 2015 | Remi Hirano no Shiawase Recipe | |
| 2015 | Remi and Asuka Hirano no "Yomeshūto Gohan Monogatari" | |
| 2016 | Remi Hirano no shin 140-ji Recipe | |
| 2016 | Watashi no Wadashi | |
