= Kojiro Shimizu =

Japanese actor and singer

- Born: November 10, 1964 (age 61); Saitama, Saitama, Japan
- Occupations: Actor; singer
- Years active: 1981–present

Kojiro Shimizu (清水 宏次朗, Shimizu Kōjirō; born November 10, 1964) is a Japanese actor whose career spans more than 30 years. Among his movies are Bee Bop High School (1985), Bee Bop highschool; Koko yotaro elegy (1986), Bee Bop highschool; Koko yotaro march (1987), and Street Fighter II: The Animated Movie (1994).

== Selected filmography ==
Year	Title	Role	Notes
1985	Be-Bop High School	Hiroshi Kato	
1986	Be-Bop High School: Kōkō Yotarō Aika	Hiroshi Kato	
1986	Yakuza Wives	Banji	
1987	Be-Bop High School: Kōkō Yotarō Kōshinkyoku	Hiroshi Kato	
1987	Be-Bop High School: Kōkō Yotarō Kyōsō-kyoku	Hiroshi Kato	
1988	Be-Bop High School: Kōkō Yotarō Kanketsu-hen	Hiroshi Kato	
1989	Roppongi Banana Boys	Tetsuo Iwata	
1993	Death of the Lion Kings	Shimizu	
1994	Street Fighter II: The Animated Movie	Ryu (voice)	
1995	82 Bunsho	Kusanagi	
1996	Ambition Without Honor	Kitahara	
1997	Ambition Without Honor 2	Kitahara	
1998	Ambition Without Honor 3: Wolf	Kitahara	
1996	Moon Angel	Daigoro Kisaragi	
2022	Be-Bop's Ossan	Hiroshi Aitoku	
