= The Crazy Family =

The Crazy Family may refer to:

- The Crazy Family (1940 film), a Swedish comedy film directed by Ivar Johansson
- The Crazy Family (1984 film), a Japanese film directed by Sogo Ishii
