= Masaomi Kondō =

Japanese actor (born 1942)

- Born: February 15, 1942 (age 84); Kyoto, Japan
- Occupation: Actor
- Years active: 1966–present

Masaomi Kondō (近藤 正臣, Kondō Masaomi; born February 15, 1942 in Kyoto, Japan) is a Japanese actor.

== Career ==
Born in Kyoto, Kondō made his film debut in Shohei Imamura's The Pornographers in 1966.

== Filmography ==
=== Films ===
| Year | Film | Role | Notes | Ref |
|---|---|---|---|---|
| 1966 | The Pornographers | Kōichi Matsuda | | |
| 1966 | Eleven Samurai | Kyonosuke Ina | | |
| 1969 | Horrors of Malformed Men | Takeshi | | |
| 1974 | The Last Samurai | | | |
| 1978 | The Fall of Ako Castle | Hashimoto Heizaemon | | |
| 1994 | Crest of Betrayal | Iori Tamiya | | |
| 2003 | The Man in White | | | |
| 2005 | The Great Yokai War | Shōjō | | |
| 2015 | Ryuzo and the Seven Henchmen | Masa | | |
| 2016 | A Man Called Pirate | Shotaro Kida | | |
| 2017 | Honnō-ji Hotel | | | |
| 2018 | We Make Antiques! | | | |
| 2022 | Whisper of the Heart | | | |

=== Television ===
| Year | Film | Role | Notes | Ref |
|---|---|---|---|---|
| 1970 | Mominoki wa Nokotta | Itō Umene | Taiga drama | |
| 1973 | Kunitori Monogatari | Akechi Mitsuhide | Taiga drama | |
| 1977-78 | Shin Hissatsu Karakurinin | Ranbei (Takano Chōei) | Hissatsu series | |
| 1978 | Ōgon no Hibi | Ishida Mitsunari | Taiga drama | |
| 1983 | Tokugawa Ieyasu | Matsudaira Hirotada | Taiga drama | |
| 1986 | Byakkotai | Hijikata Toshizō | | |
| 1987 | Hissatsu Kengekinin | | Hissatsu series | |
| 1990 | Moeyo Ken | Itō Kashitarō | Miniseries | |
| 1991 | Taiheiki | Kitabatake Chikafusa | Taiga drama | |
| 1995 | Toyotomi Hideyoshi Tenka wo Toru | Akechi Mitsuhide | | |
| 1999 | Genroku Ryōran | Makino Narisada | Taiga drama | |
| 1999 | Gokenin Zankurō | Hirate Miki | | |
| 2002 | Part-Time Detective | Yoshihiko Kagami | | |
| 2003 | Musashi | Ōno Harunaga | Taiga drama | |
| 2006 | Kōmyō ga Tsuji | Hosokawa Yūsai | Taiga drama | |
| 2007–17 | Kagerō no Tsuji Inemuri Iwane Edo Zōshi | Yoshizō | | |
| 2010 | Mito Kōmon | Ōkubo Tadatomo | | |
| 2010 | Ryōmaden | Yamauchi Yōdō | Taiga drama | |
| 2011 | Diplomat Kosaku Kuroda | The Minister for Foreign Affairs | | |
| 2012 | Carnation | Heizō Miura | Asadora | |
| 2013 | Bon Appetit! | Shōzō Nishikado | Asadora | |
| 2015 | Here Comes Asa! | Masayoshi Shirooka | Asadora | |
| 2016 | Sanada Maru | Honda Masanobu | Taiga drama | |
