= Henry Pike Bowie =

American Japanologist (1848–1920)

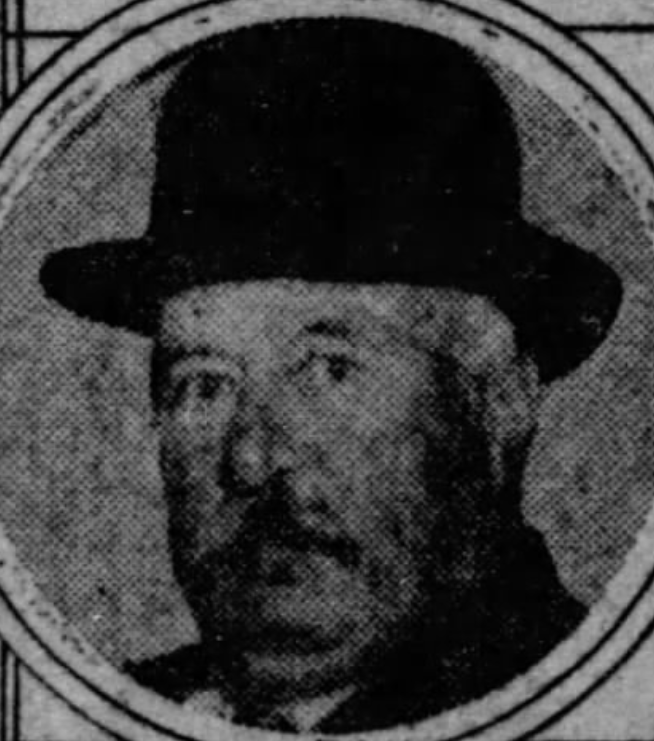
- Born: c. 1848
- Died: December 21, 1920 (aged 72); San Mateo, California
- Occupations: Japanologist, diplomat

Henry Pike Bowie (c. 1848 – December 21, 1920) was an American lawyer, artist, author, Japanologist, and diplomat.

== Biography ==
In the late 1880s, Bowie commissioned Makoto Hagiwara, the manager of the Japanese Tea Garden in San Francisco's Golden Gate Park, to plan a garden and tea house for his home on the border of Hillsborough and San Mateo, California in California's San Mateo County. This Japanese garden, called "Higurashi-en" or "A garden worthy of a day's contemplation," was created between 1887 and 1892. Although it has been reduced in size to about an acre in the 21st century, it is the largest privately owned "Authentic" Japanese garden in the United States, and it is on the National Register of Historic Places. A highlight of the garden is a silvery-green, five-needled Mikado pine, which was given to Bowie by Emperor Meiji. Bowie's later additions to the garden include a triple laceleaf Japanese maple and other artefacts from the 1915 Panama-Pacific International Exposition (1915). The property was purchased by Achille and Joan Paladini of Hillsborough, California, in 1988 and restored to its original pristine condition. It was featured on The Oprah Winfrey Show and has been the location for a recent movie. The director of Memoirs of a Geisha visited the property and considered it for the film.

After the death of his first wife, Bowie first visited Japan in 1893. He returned in 1894, residing with the Hirano family of Yokohama. During this period, he devoted himself to practicing his Japanese language skills, studying Japanese painting, and broadening his understanding of Japanese culture. He studied painting and, after perfecting the style, Bowie won awards for his pictures at public exhibitions, and the emperor acquired two of his paintings.

Bowie served as the first president of the Japan Society of America, which was founded in San Francisco in 1905. The organization was conceived by three San Francisco women, inspired by the success of the Japan Society of London.(“Art of Japan Will Be Topic.” The Morning Press [Santa Barbara, Ca.], no vol. #, 6 Jan. 1907 (Sun.), p. 3.) Two years later a New York City chapter was organized. (The San Francisco chapter is now called the Japan Society of Northern California.)

In 1909, he erected a memorial gate, created by Japanese craftsmen brought from Japan specifically for the project. The memorial structure in Burlingame was designed to honor the valor of Japanese sailors and soldiers during the Russo-Japanese War (1905).

In 1918, he sailed for Japan as special emissary of the U.S. Department of State. Shortly after returning to California, he died in San Mateo on December 21, 1920, at age 72.

== Descendants ==
His son in Japan, Imao Hirano, was a poet and worked for abolishing discrimination against mixed race children. Imao's daughter, Remi Hirano, who is known as a cooking expert in Japan, married to Makoto Wada. Sho Wada, the guitarist and vocalist of Triceratops and the husband of Juri Ueno, is their son.

== Selected works ==
- 1911 -- On the laws of Japanese Painting.

== Honors ==
- Order of the Rising Sun, Gold Rays with Rosette, 1909.
