= Shin Hissatsu Karakurinin =

Japanese drama television series

- Also known as: 新 必殺からくり人
- Genre: Jidaigeki
- Directed by: Eiichi Kudo; Koreyoshi Kurahara
- Starring: Masaomi Kondō; Ken Ogata; Judy Ongg; Isuzu Yamada
- Country of origin: Japan
- Original language: Japanese
- No. of episodes: 13

Production
- Producers: Hisashi Yamauchi; Rikyū Nakagawa
- Running time: 45 minutes (per episode)
- Production companies: Asahi Broadcasting Corporation; Shochiku

Original release
- Network: ANN (ABC, TV Asahi)
- Release: 1977 – 1978

Shin Hissatsu Karakurinin (新 必殺からくり人) is a Japanese jidaigeki or period drama that was broadcast in prime-time from 1977 to 1978. It is 11th in the Hissatsu series.

== Cast ==
- Masaomi Kondō as Ranbei(Takano Chōei)
- Ken Ogata as Andō Hiroshige
- Isuzu Yamada as Oen
- Judy Ongg
- Gannosuke Ashiya as Burahei
