= Mahjong hōrōki =

- Film poster

Japanese name
- Kanji: 麻雀放浪記
- Literal meaning: Mahjong Chronicles
Transcriptions
- Revised Hepburn: Mājan Hōrōki
- Directed by: Makoto Wada
- Written by: Shinichiro Sawai; Makoto Wada
- Based on: Mahjong hōrōki by Takehiro Irokawa
- Produced by: Atsushi Mihori
- Starring: Hiroyuki Sanada; Takeshi Kaga; Mariko Kaga; Kaku Takashina; Akira Nagoya
- Cinematography: Shohei Ando
- Edited by: Kiyoaki Saito
- Music by: Kentarō Haneda
- Production company: Kadokawa Pictures
- Distributed by: Toei Company
- Release date: October 10, 1984 (Japan)
- Running time: 109 minutes
- Country: Japan
- Language: Japanese

Mahjong hōrōki (Japanese: 麻雀放浪記; lit. Mahjong Chronicles) is a 1984 Japanese film directed by Makoto Wada. The film is based on an autobiographical novel by Takehiro Irokawa. It stars Hiroyuki Sanada in the lead role, in addition to Takeshi Kaga, Mariko Kaga, Kaku Takashina and Akira Nagoya. Toei Company theatrically released the film on October 10, 1984, in Japan.

== Cast ==
- Hiroyuki Sanada as Bouya Tetsu
- Takeshi Kaga as Dosa Ken
- Mariko Kaga as Mama
- Kaku Takashina as Deme Toku
- Kenichi Kato as Womanizer
- Akira Nagoya as Jyoushuu Tora
- Hideyo Amamoto as Hachimaki
- Chin Naito as Orin
- Takashi Sasano as Suzuki
- Takashi Shikauchi as Teddy
- Katsuyuki Shinohara as Hage
- Sam Sloan as American Hustler at Mama's Club
- Tonbo Zushi as Soya
- Shinobu Otake as Mayumi
- Mari Kouno
- Enver Altenbay as Man who lost $1200

== Awards and nominations ==
6th Yokohama Film Festival

- Won: Best Film
- Won: Best Actor - Takeshi Kaga
- Won: Best Supporting Actor - Kaku Takashina
