= Masako Izumi =

Japanese actress (1947–2025)

- 和泉 雅子
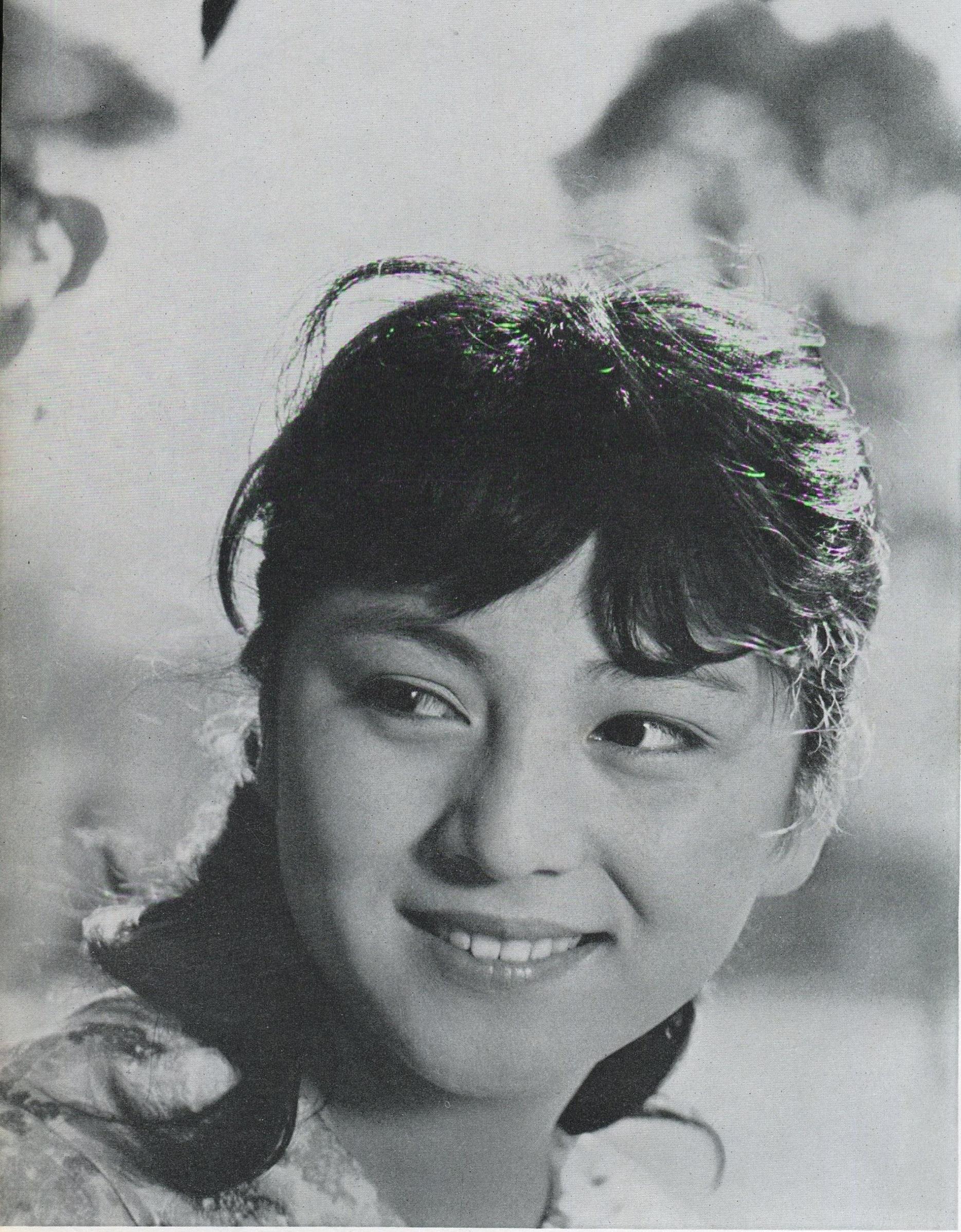
- Izumi in 1963
- Born: 31 July 1947; Ginza, Tokyo, Japan
- Died: 9 July 2025 (aged 77)
- Occupation: Actress
- Years active: 1958–2025

Masako Izumi (和泉 雅子, Izumi Masako; 31 July 1947 – 9 July 2025) was a Japanese actress, singer and adventurer.

== Life and career ==
Izumi was born in Ginza, Tokyo, Japan on 31 July 1947. She joined Wakakusa Theatre Company and started her acting career as a child actress at the age of 11. Three years later, she moved to Nikkatsu Film company and she became one of the three representative actresses of the Nikkatsu called Nikkatsu Sannin Musume along with Sayuri Yoshinaga and Chieko Matsubara.

In 1963, Izumi starred in Kirio Urayama's film Bad Girl and the film won a Golden Prize at the 3rd Moscow International Film Festival.

Izumi was the first Japanese woman to reach the North Pole on an expedition, which she did in 1989.

Izumi died from cancer on 9 July 2025, at the age of 77.

== Selected filmography ==
- Kojo no Tsuki (1958)
- The Snow Flurry (1959) as Sakura Nagura
- The Seven Challengers (1961)
- The Love Story of Ginza (1962)
- Bad Girl (1963) as Wakae Kita
- Hikaru umi (1963)
- The Bastard (1963) as Emiko Okamura
- Wakakusa Monogatari (1964) as Chieko
- Tattooed Life (1965) as Midori Kinoshita
- The Society (1968) as Mineko Kobayashi
- The Wild Sea (1969)
- Earth Ninja Chronicles: Duel in the Wind (1979)
- Men and War Part II (1971)
- Blood Vendetta (1971)
- Shin Heike Monogatari (1972) (TV series) as Yomogiko
- Wataru Seken wa Oni Bakari (1998) (TV series)
