= Ken Tanaka (actor) =

Japanese actor

- Born: 6 March 1951 (age 75); Chikugo, Fukuoka
- Occupation: Actor
- Years active: 1974–present

Ken Tanaka (田中健, Tanaka Ken; born 6 March 1951) is a Japanese actor. He has appeared in more than 40 films since 1974.

== Filmography ==
=== Film ===
Year	Title	Role	Notes	Ref.
1974	Sandakan No. 8	Hideo Takeuchi		
1975	The Gate of Youth	Shinsuke Ibuki		
1978	Pink Lady no Katsudō Daishashin	Takayuki Tanaka		
1984	The Return of Godzilla	Goro Maki		
1985	Godzilla 1985	Goro Maki		
1986	Final Take			
2021	The Woman of S.R.I. the Movie			
2022	The Setting Sun (film)			
2024	Tomorrow in the Finder			
2024	Silence of the Sea			
2025	One Last Throw	Toru Numata		
2026	Our Journey for 50 Years	Takao "Omeda" Nakatani		

=== Television ===
Year	Title	Role	Notes	Ref.
1975	Oretachi no Tabi	Takao "Omeda" Nakatani		
1983	Tokugawa Ieyasu	Matsudaira Tadateru	Taiga drama	
1987	Hissatsu Kengekinin		Hissatsu series	
1992	Nobunaga: King of Zipang	Sakuma Nobumori	Taiga drama	
2002	Toshiie and Matsu	Sakuma Nobumori	Taiga drama	
2006	Kōmyō ga Tsuji	Honda Sakuzaemon	Taiga drama	
2026	Water Margin	Shi Li		
