= Sōhachi Yamaoka =

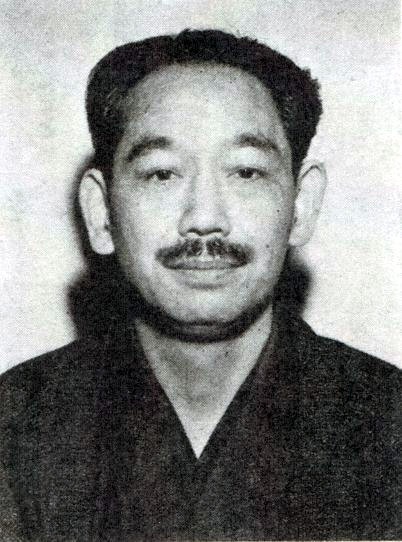

Sōhachi Yamaoka (山岡荘八, Yamaoka Sōhachi; January 11, 1907 – September 30, 1978) from Niigata was a Japanese author. He wrote a number of historical novels. Politician Kenji Yamaoka is an adopted son. In 1968, he won the Yoshikawa Eiji Prize for his historical novel Tokugawa Ieyasu.

== Awards ==
- 1958 - Chunichi Prize
- 1967 - Shin Hasegawa Prize
- 1968 - Yoshikawa Eiji Prize
- 1973- Medal with Purple Ribbon
- 1978 - 2nd Class, Order of the Sacred Treasure

== Selected published works ==
- Otoko no Koi (1938)
- Marshall Yamamoto Isoroku (1944)
- Young Chiba Shusaku (1955)
- Chiba Shūsaku (1952-54)
- Tokugawa Ieyasu (1953-67) - 28 volumes
- Oda Nobunaga (1955-60) - 8 volumes
- Young Oda Nobunaga (1965)
- Yamada Nagamasa (1956)
- Sakamoto Ryōma (1956)
- Mito Kōmon (1957)
- Minamoto no Yoritomo (1957-60) - 3 volumes
- Shin Taiheiki (1957-62) - 8 volumes
- Nobusuke Kishi (1959)
- Ikiteita Mitsuhide (1963)
- Yagyū clan (1964)
- Mōri Motonari (1964)
- Isehon Taikoki (1965) - 7 volumes
- Pacific War (1965-71) - 9 volumes
- Takasugi Shinsaku (1966)
- Yoshida Shōin (1968)
- Emperor Meiji (1968) - 3 volumes
- Date Masamune (1970-73)
- Haru no Sakamichi (1971)
- Tokugawa Yoshinobu (1974) - 5 volumes
- Tokugawa Iemitsu (1974-76) - 3 volumes
- Unprecedented Man - Ryōichi Sasakawa (1978)

== Adaptations ==
=== Television ===
- Haru no Sakamichi (1971)
- Tokugawa Ieyasu (1983)
- Dokuganryū Masamune (1987)

=== Film ===
- Kurenaigao no Wakamusha: Oda Nobunaga (1955), a Toei production
- Fuunji Oda Nobunaga (1959), a Toei production
- Tokugawa Ieyasu (1965), a Toei production
