= Hideki Takahashi =

Japanese actor

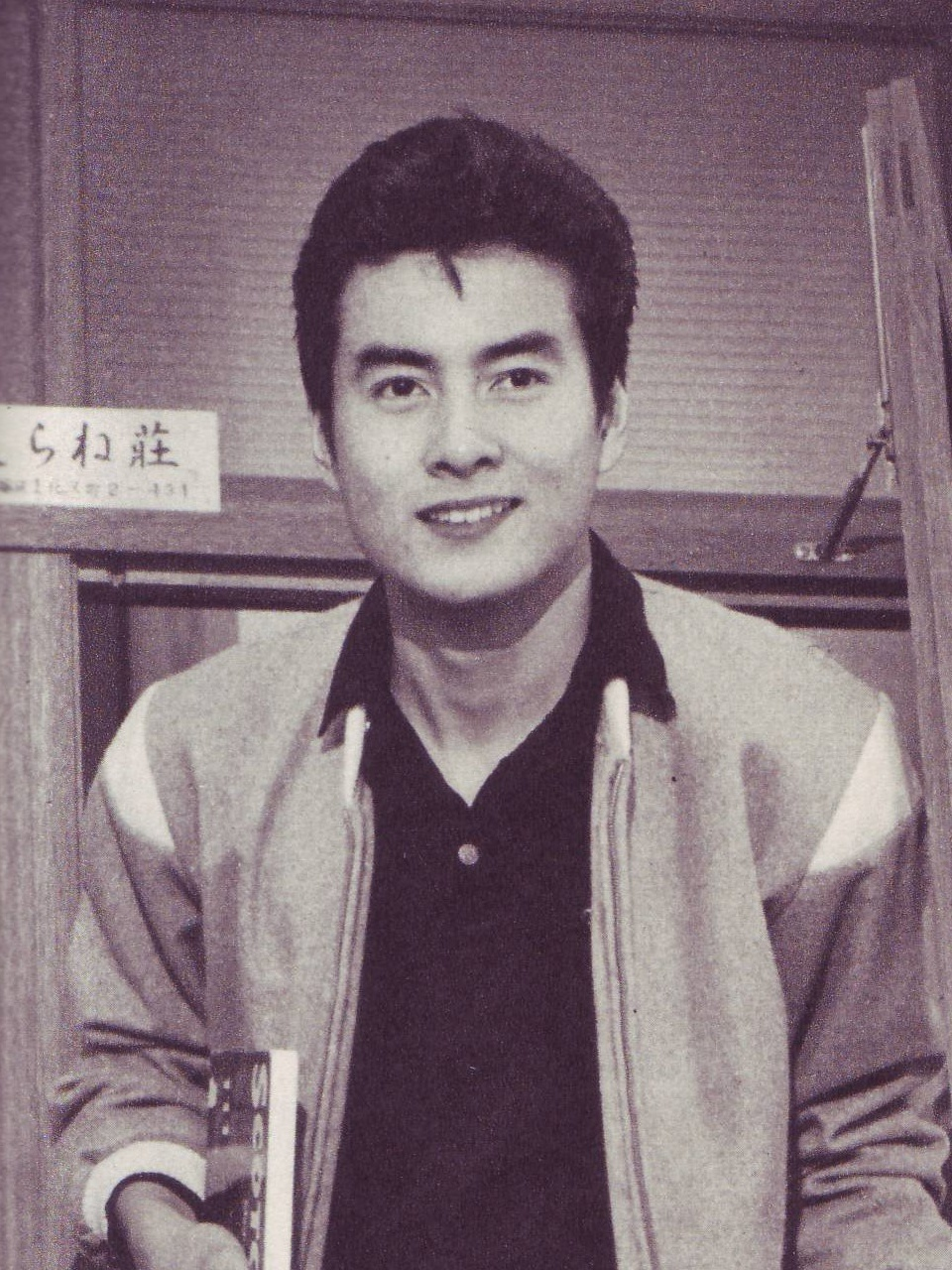
- Takahashi in 1962
- Born: February 10, 1944 (age 82); Chiba, Japan
- Occupation: Actor
- Years active: 1961–present
- Spouse: Akiko Kobayashi (m. 1974)
- Children: Maasa Takahashi
- Website: https://grapecom.jp/talent_writer/takahashi-hideki/

Hideki Takahashi (高橋 英樹, Takahashi Hideki; born February 10, 1944) is a Japanese actor. Born in Kisarazu, Chiba near Tokyo, he attended Ichikawa Gakuen and later Nihon University.

== Career ==
Takahashi made his debut with Nikkatsu and acted in youth-oriented films. Takahashi made his film debut with Kōgenji directed by Buichi Saitō in 1961. In 1963, he starred in the yakuza film The Symbol of a Man directed by Akinori Matsuo and won popularity. Under exclusive contract with Nikkatsu, his notable films are Fighting Elegy and Tattooed Life.

In 1971, Takahashi left Nikkatsu and became a freelance actor. In 1974, he starred in Kenji Misumi's last film The Last Samurai. On television, he became a star in such jidaigeki television dramas as Kunitori Monogatari and Momotarō-zamurai. Modern roles are also in his repertoire. Among these is Detective Totsukawa in the Nishimura Kyōtarō Travel Mystery series. Takahashi is also active as a personality in quiz shows, exemplified by Quiz Nihonjin no Shitsumon (NHK, 1993–2003). He was a judge for Iron Chef.

== Family ==
His daughter is Maasa Takahashi, a professional presenter of Fuji Television.

== Selected filmography ==
=== Film ===
| Year | Title | Role | Notes | Ref. |
|---|---|---|---|---|
| 1961 | Kōgenji | | | |
| 1962 | Ue o muite aruko | Ken Matsumoto | | |
| 1963 | Izu no Odoriko | Kawasaki | Lead role | |
| 1963 | Aoi sanmyaku | Yasukichi Tominaga | | |
| 1963 | The Symbol of a Man | | Lead role | |
| 1964 | Our Blood Will Not Forgive | | Lead role | |
| 1965 | Tattooed Life | | Lead role | |
| 1966 | Fighting Elegy | Kiroku Nanbu | Lead role | |
| 1968 | The Sword Gamblers | Joekichi Hanada | | |
| 1969 | Daimon Otokode Shinitai | Nonaka Tetsugorō | Lead role | |
| 1969 | The Wild Sea | Katsuyuki Shinoda | Lead role | |
| 1970 | Men and War Part I | Shintaro Tsuge | | |
| 1970 | Earth Ninja Chronicles: Duel in the Wind | | Lead role | |
| 1971 | Gyakuen Mitsusakazuki | Kikukawa | Lead role | |
| 1971 | Men and War Part II | Shintaro Tsuge | | |
| 1973 | Miyamoto Musashi | Miyamoto Musashi | Lead role | |
| 1973 | Men and War Part III | Shintaro Tsuge | | |
| 1974 | The Last Samurai | Sugi Toranosuke | Lead role | |
| 2011 | Pokémon the Movie: Black—Victini and Reshiram and White—Victini and Zekrom | Zekrom (voice) | | |
| 2017 | Napping Princess | Isshin Shijima (voice) | | |

=== Television ===
| Year | Title | Role | Notes | Ref. |
|---|---|---|---|---|
| 1968 | Ryōma ga Yuku | Takechi Hanpeita | Taiga drama | |
| 1969–1970 | Kurama Tengu | Kurama Tengu | Lead role | |
| 1971 | Haru no Sakamichi | Sakazaki Naomori | Taiga drama | |
| 1973 | Kunitori Monogatari | Oda Nobunaga | Lead role; Taiga drama | |
| 1974–1975 | Amigasa Jūbei | Tsukimori Jūbei | Lead role | |
| 1976–1981 | Momotarō-zamurai (NTV) | Momotarō | Lead role | |
| 1977 | Kashin | Kawai Tsugunosuke | Taiga drama | |
| 1982–1985 | Tōyama no Kin-san | Kin-san | Lead role | |
| 1987–1995 | Sanbiki ga Kiru! | Yasaka Heishirō | Lead role | |
| 1988–2002 | Hideki Takahashi's Captain Series | Keizō Sugisaki | Lead role | |
| 1990 | Tobu ga Gotoku | Shimazu Hisamitsu | Taiga drama | |
| 1992–1994 | Momotarō-zamurai (TV Asahi) | Momotarō | Lead role | |
| 1994 | Oda Nobunaga | Oda Nobunaga | Lead role | |
| 1998 | Shadow Warrior Tokugawa Ieyasu (TV Asahi) | Tokugawa Ieyasu and his double | Lead role | |
| 2000–2022 | Kyotaro Nishimura Travel Mystery | Inspector Totsugawa | Lead role | |
| 2001 | Hōjō Tokimune | Mōri Suemitsu | Taiga drama | |
| 2005 | Yoshitsune | Fujiwara no Hidehira | Taiga drama | |
| 2008 | Atsuhime | Shimazu Nariakira | Taiga drama | |
| 2009 | Nene: Onna Taikōki | Tokugawa Ieyasu | Miniseries | |
| 2009–2011 | Clouds Over the Hill | Kodama Gentarō | | |
| 2011 | The After-Dinner Mysteries | Seitarō Hōshō | | |
| 2014 | Hell Teacher Nūbē | Mugenkai Jikū | | |
| 2014 | Shadow Warrior Tokugawa Ieyasu (TV Tokyo) | Shima Sakon | | |
| 2015 | Burning Flower | Ii Naosuke | Taiga drama | |
| 2016 | Here Comes Asa! | Ōkuma Shigenobu | Asadora | |
| 2025 | News Anchor | Yoshio Kunisada | | |
| 2025 | Unbound | Tokugawa Harusada | Taiga drama | |
