= Haru no Sakamichi (TV series) =

- Genre: Taiga drama
- Written by: Gihō Sugiyama
- Starring: Nakamura Kinnosuke; Chitose Kobayashi; Yoshio Harada; Isamu Nagato; Masakazu Tamura; Ryō Tamura; Rumi Matsumoto; Hiroshi Akutagawa; Atsuo Nakamura; Go Wakabayashi; Koji Shimizu; Yoshio Tsuchiya; Shōgo Shimada; Hideki Takahashi; Kazuo Funaki; Kyōko Kishida; Tomoko Naraoka; Yoko Tsukasa; Ichikawa Ebizō X So Yamamura
- Theme music composer: Akira Miyoshi
- Opening theme: NHK Symphony Orchestra
- Country of origin: Japan
- Original language: Japanese
- No. of episodes: 52

Production
- Running time: 45 minutes

Original release
- Network: NHK
- Release: January 3 – December 26, 1971

Haru no Sakamichi (春の坂道) is a 1971 Japanese television series. It is the ninth NHK taiga drama.

Average viewership rating: 21.7%, with highest rating peaking at 27.5%. No footage in full color is said to still exist, and only the 52nd episode still remains in black and white due to recording technology at the time.

== Story ==
Haru no Sakamichi deals with the late Sengoku period to early Edo period. It is based on Sōhachi Yamaoka's novel of the same name.

The story chronicles the life of Yagyū Munenori, a daimyo and swordsman under Tokugawa Ieyasu during the Sengoku and Edo periods of Japanese history.

== Production ==
Production Credits

- Original story – Sōhachi Yamaoka
- Music – Akira Miyoshi

== Cast ==
=== Yagyū Clan ===
- Nakamura Kinnosuke as Yagyū Munenori
- Chitose Kobayashi as Orin
- Rumi Matsumoto as Karasuma Junko
- Hiroshi Akutagawa as Yagyū Munetoshi
- Yoshio Harada as Yagyū Jūbei Mitsuyoshi
- Ryo Tamura as Yagyū Samon
- Koji Shimizu as Yagyū Munefuyu

=== Tokugawa Clan ===
- So Yamamura as Tokugawa Ieyasu
- Tetsuya Aoyama as Tokugawa Hidetada
- Ichikawa Ebizō X as Tokugawa Iemitsu
- Yoko Tsukasa as Lady Kasuga
- Tetsuo Ishidate as Matsudaira Tadateru
- Kazuo Funaki as Tokugawa Tadanaga
- Isao Sasaki as Matsudaira Tadanao

=== Toyotomi Clan ===
- Shikaku Nakamura as Toyotomi Hideyoshi
- Tomoko Naraoka as Nene
- Kyōko Kishida as Yodo-dono
- Kataoka Takao as Toyotomi Hideyori
- Atsuo Nakamura as Ishida Mitsunari
- Kazuo Kitamura as Shima Sakon
- Kōjirō Kusanagi as Konishi Yukinaga
- Junshi Shimada as Kimura Shigenari
- Masao Shimizu as Asano Nagamasa
- Etsushi Takahashi as Kuroda Nagamasa
- Shōgo Shimada as Sanada Yukimura
- Masakazu Tamura as Fuwa Bansaku
- Yoshio Tsuchiya as Ōtani Yoshitsugu

=== Others ===
- Takahiro Tamura as Takuan Sōhō
- Hideki Takahashi as Sakazaki Naomori
- Shun Oide as Matsudaira Nobutsuna
- Tappie Shimokawa
- Go Wakabayashi as Araki Mataemon
- Akiji Kobayashi as Abe Shigetsugu
- Mitsuko Baisho as Osame
- Tōru Emori as Doi Toshikatsu
- Takashi Shimura as Aoyama Tadatoshi
- Isamu Nagato as Yosa
- Isao Hashizume as Tawara Harunosuke
