= Gō Wakabayashi =

Japanese actor

- 若林 豪
- Born: 森武 久明 (Hisaaki Moritake); September 5, 1939 (age 87); Nagasaki, Japan
- Occupation: Actor
- Years active: 1966–present

Gō Wakabayashi (若林 豪, Wakabayashi Gō; born September 5, 1939) is a Japanese film and television actor from Nagasaki.

== Career ==
A graduate of Senshu University, Wakabayashi became a member of Shin Kokugeki, then Wakabayashi Promotions. Currently he is a member of Toho Entertainment.

After some roles in minor television series, he appeared for the first time in an NHK taiga drama, Mominoki wa Nokotta in 1970. The network tapped him the following year for the role of Araki Mataemon in Haru no Sakamichi. (A different Araki, the hatamoto Jūzaemon, was his character in a later film, The Fall of Ako Castle, directed by Kinji Fukasaku.) Also in 1971, he appeared as Maehara Isuke in the year-long series Daichūshingura with Toshirō Mifune. He took guest roles in many other television series, including Mifune's Kōya no Surōnin, the 1970s Lone Wolf and Cub TV series, and Suikoden.

Returning to NHK, he portrayed Saitō Yoshitatsu in the 1973 taiga drama Kunitori Monogatari. He has also appeared as Sanada Yukimura in Tokugawa Ieyasu (1983), and as the same warrior in Dokuganryū Masamune (1987). He played Abe Masahiro in the 1990 Tobu ga Gotoku, his most recent taiga drama appearance.

Other Edo period roles have included Katsu Kaishū, Kondō Isami, Nakajima Saburōsuke, Ōkubo Ichiō, and Yagyū Jūbei Mitsuyoshi. A jidaigeki role was Hotta Settsu-no-kami in Meibugyō Tōyama no Kin-san.

In the mid-1970s, Wakabayashi took prominent contemporary roles, appearing as a detective in Taiyō ni Hoero!, Oretachi no Kunshō, and G-Men '75. In the last, he had a regular prime-time role in Episodes 105–335, co-starring with Tetsurō Tamba. The pair played the same roles in G-Men '82 (1982–83).

Wakabayashi appears frequently in two-hour specials, often as a detective. He has starred in shows on TV Asahi, Fuji Television, Nippon Television, and Tokyo Broadcasting System. A very different role was as a chef in Sushi Ōji (2007).

He is also a celebrity, appearing on variety and quiz shows. He has done commercials for a variety of products. Wakabayashi dubbed the voice of Rock Hudson's Stewart McMillan in the NHK broadcasts of McMillan & Wife.

== Filmography ==
=== Film ===
- Karafuto 1945 Natsu Hyōsetsu no Mon (1974)
- The Fall of Ako Castle (1978)
- The Battle of Port Arthur (1980)
- Lost in the Wilderness (1986)
- Ambition Without Honor 2 (1997)
- Musashi (2019)
- Baian the Assassin, M.D. (2023)
- Kami no Shima (2025)

=== Television ===
- Daichūshingura (1971)
- Haru no Sakamichi (1971), Araki Mataemon
- Kunitori Monogatari (1973), Saitō Yoshitatsu
- The Water Margin (1973),
- Amigasa Jūbei (1974)
- G-Men '75 (1976–82)
- Tokugawa Ieyasu (1983), Sanada Yukimura
- Dokuganryū Masamune (1987), Sanada Yukimura
- Ōedo Sōsamō (1991), Matsudaira Sadanobu
- The Queen of Lunchtime Cuisine (2002)
- Sushi Ōji! (2007)
- Tenchijin (2009), Shima Sakon
- Kodoku no Gourmet (2017)
- Cold Case Season 3 (2020)

== Sources ==
This article incorporates material from 若林豪 (Wakabayashi Gō) in the Japanese Wikipedia, retrieved on March 4, 2008.
