= Momotarō-zamurai =

Momotarō-zamurai (桃太郎侍) or Samurai Momotarō is a Japanese novel by Kiichirō Yamate (1899–1978). Published in 1946, the novel centers on an Edo-period rōnin, Shinjirō, the younger twin brother of a daimyō who was caught in a succession dispute. Shinjirō comes to the aid of his brother in this good versus evil plot in which the title character assumes the name of Momotarō.

Momotarō-zamurai has been the basis for many jidaigeki films and television series. The first, with the same title as the novel, was released in 1952. The second version (1957) was directed by Kenji Misumi (1921–1975), who also directed Shintaro Katsu in the Zatoichi films and directed a film version of Lone Wolf and Cub. Raizō Ichikawa starred in the title role. Kōtarō Satomi took the role in the 1960 production, and Kōjirō Hongō played the part in the 1963.

The television series premiered in 1976 and continued until 1981. Hideki Takahashi played Momotarō in 258 episodes, as well as his twin brother in cameo appearances. Hitoshi Ueki, Gajirō Satō, Yumiko Nogawa, and Shingo Yamashiro were the supporting cast. Nippon Television broadcast the series; later, TV Asahi showed specials in 1992 and 1993.

In July 2006, a new television series, Shin Momotaro Zamurai (新・桃太郎侍) premiered on TV Asahi. Masahiro Takashima plays the lead. Regulars include Yasuko Tomita, Tamao Nakamura, and Tonpei Hidari. In Hawaii it aired English subtitled on KIKU as Momotaro Samurai.
