= Three Outlaw Samurai =

- Theatrical release poster
- Directed by: Hideo Gosha
- Written by: Keiichi Abe; Eizaburo Shiba; Hideo Gosha
- Produced by: Ginichi Kishimoto; Tetsuro Tamba
- Starring: Tetsuro Tamba; Isamu Nagato; Mikijirō Hira; Yoshiko Kayama
- Cinematography: Tadashi Sakai
- Edited by: Kazuo Ota
- Music by: Toshiaki Tsushima
- Production company: Shochiku
- Release date: May 13, 1964 (Japan)
- Running time: 93 minutes
- Country: Japan
- Language: Japanese

Three Outlaw Samurai (Japanese: 三匹の侍, Hepburn: Sanbiki no Samurai) is a 1964 Japanese chambara film directed and co-written by Hideo Gosha in his feature-length debut.

The film is an origin-story offshoot of Gosha's 1963 Japanese television series of the same name, with the same lead actors, Tetsuro Tamba, Isamu Nagato, and Mikijirō Hira. The film involves a wandering ronin who finds himself involved with two other samurai who are hired to execute a band of peasants who have kidnapped the daughter of a corrupt magistrate.

== Plot ==
Wandering ronin Sakon Shiba arrives at a mill where three peasants (Yohachi, Gosaku, and Jinbei) have kidnapped the local magistrate's daughter Aya. A dispatch of the magistrate's soldiers arrive and propose clemency in exchange for Aya's return; the kidnappers refuse, stating that the hostage will not be freed until the regional lord agrees to lower taxes for the starving peasantry. The soldiers attempt a sneak attack, but are rebuffed. The lord then assigns a new party, including his samurai Kikyo and the vagabond samurai Kyojuro Sakura, to end the standoff.

Shiba meets the new party in front of the mill and convinces Sakura to switch sides, since he sympathizes with the peasants' plight. His second rescue having been unsuccessful, the magistrate puts together a new group of mercenaries to carry out the job, and takes his own hostage, Gosaku's daughter Yasu. Confronted with Yasu's capture, the peasants and mercenaries make an agreement: Aya will be freed, and the peasants will go unharmed, so long as Shiba takes 100 blows as punishment. All parties swear on their honor to uphold the agreement.

Shiba is taken into custody and whipped. Aya witnesses Shiba's cruel punishment and begs her father to show mercy. Shiba's savage beating nevertheless continues, and he vows revenge on the magistrate for breaking the samurai code of honor. The magistrate orders the killing of Yohachi, Gosaku, and Jinbei, but Jinbei throws a signed petition for the regional lord into a river just before his murder.

Sakura sneaks into the magistrate's house and tells a servant maiden of the peasants' murders. Shocked at the magistrate's treachery, she frees Shiba and is then killed by the dungeon guard. Kikyo arrives and, moved by Shiba's integrity, lets him escape the dungeon. Aya finds Shiba crawling through the house and hides him, as she is now also convinced of Shiba's and the peasants' virtue.

Shiba and Sakura decamp to the mill, and Sakura stumbles upon the lost petition while filling a bucket of water at a stream. The magistrate, having grown increasingly anxious at the impending visit of the regional lord, orders most of his mercenaries to be killed by a pair of elite samurai, who become responsible for hunting down the outlaws and recovering the petition. The elite samurai first attack Kikyo, wounding him, and stab his lover Omaki to death before he kills both of them; Kikyo finally decides he, too, will switch sides, and joins the other two outlaws at the mill.

Sakura visits a love interest, Oine, and finds she is being held at knifepoint by the magistrate's men. He divulges the location of the petition – the mill – in exchange for her freedom, and is let go. Ouchi, the best swordsman in the land, arrives in anticipation of the regional lord's visit and brings a large posse of samurai to attack the mill once again. Shiba and Kikyo take on the massive force, and Sakura arrives in the middle of the battle, having decided that loyalty to his fellow samurai outweighs devotion to his new love. Shiba defeats Ouchi and then chases down a group of peasants in order to convince them to deliver the petition to the lord. They timidly refuse; incensed, Shiba runs to kill the magistrate, but Aya throws herself in front of her father, imploring Shiba to save his life. The magistrate attempts to run, but Shiba chops off his hair bun, telling him to let the lord and the peasants "see his disgrace". Shiba returns to the other outlaws, and, uncertain of their futures, the three choose a direction at random to walk.

== Cast ==
- Tetsuro Tamba as Sakon Shiba
- Isamu Nagato as Kyojuro Sakura
- Mikijirō Hira as Einosuke Kikyo
- Miyuki Kuwano as Aya
- Yoshiko Kayama as Oyasu
- Kyoko Aoi as Omitsu
- Kamatari Fujiwara as Jinbei
- Hisashi Igawa as the Magistrate Mosuke
- Toshie Kimura as Oine
- Yōko Mihara as Omaki
- Bokuzen Hidari as Sakusan
- Junkichi Orimoto as Kurahashi

== Production ==
Hideo Gosha debuted as a director in 1962, with the television series Three Outlaw Samurai. His first feature film also titled Three Outlaw Samurai, was released two years later and was based on the series. It was produced by Shochiku and was his first feature film.

== Release ==
The film was released in 1964. On February 14, 2012, the Criterion Collection released a DVD and Blu-ray of the film.

== Reception ==
Bilge Ebiri, commissioned by Criterion Collection to write an essay on the film, wrote:

"Three Outlaw Samurai is a supremely confident big-screen debut, whose surface simplicity masks a scathing vision of society lurking beneath. In some ways, it recalls Kurosawa's samurai narratives, with its tale of renegade rōnin who come to the aid of the dispossessed. But Gosha's personal obsessions are all over the film, particularly in his depiction of the loss of honor through blind loyalty (and its liberating opposite, the regaining of honor by betrayal), and in the sharp contrast he makes between the refined, comforting worlds of power and social duty and the wild, almost animalistic existence of those who choose freedom. And unlike Kurosawa, whose characters tend to be classically drawn and endlessly layered, Gosha often works in broad strokes: his characters are archetypes, which he then deconstructs and plays off one another. A samurai can go from fighting alongside a group to fighting against them in one brief shot, as in Three Outlaw Samurai. These characters may be simple, but Gosha’s real interest is in the portrait of society he is creating—and that is anything but."

Glenn Erickson, in an article for Turner Classic Movies published after the Criterion Collection Blu-ray release, wrote:

"[I]t's an impressively well-told story with interesting characters and a surprise in every scene. Gosha and his writers Keiichi Abe and Eizaburo Shiba work clever games with the standard samurai archetypes: all are present, yet they refuse to accept their traditional roles. Gosha's thriller soon lets us know that it is not going to be yet another simplistic morality play about honor and loyalty....[Gosha] makes Three Outlaw Samurai a thorough critique of authoritarian society and the traditional honor code of the samurai. In Gosha's view the oppressive forces are money, power and class. The magistrate subscribes to no code except his own convenience and prestige. The only honor to be found in is therefore the opposition of unjust authority."

Rian Johnson has said that Three Outlaw Samurai influenced the writing of his film Star Wars: The Last Jedi.
