= Our Blood Will Not Forgive =

1964 film

- Theatrical poster
- Directed by: Seijun Suzuki
- Written by: Ryuma Takemori; Katsuhiro Hosomi; Michiko Ito; Kenro Matsūra (Novel)
- Produced by: Masayuki Takagi
- Starring: Akira Kobayashi; Hideki Takahashi
- Cinematography: Shigeyoshi Mine
- Edited by: Akira Suzuki
- Music by: Tadanori Suzuki; Hiroshi Ikezawa
- Distributed by: Nikkatsu
- Release date: October 3, 1964 (Japan)
- Running time: 98 minutes
- Country: Japan
- Language: Japanese

Our Blood Will Not Forgive (Japanese: 俺たちの血が許さない, Hepburn: Oretachi no chi ga yurusanai), also known as Our Blood Will Not Allow It or The Call of Blood, is a 1964 Japanese film by the noted filmmaker Seijun Suzuki. It stars Akira Kobayashi and Hideki Takahashi as two brothers who seek revenge on the yakuza for the death of their father.

== Cast ==
- Akira Kobayashi as Ryōta Asari
- Hideki Takahashi as Shinji Asari
- Kaku Takashina as Katagai
- Shōbun Inoue as Ushigoro Tobita
- Chieko Matsubara as Yasuko
- Eitaro Ozawa as Nambada
