= Kunitori Monogatari =

1963 novel by Ryōtarō Shiba

Kunitori Monogatari (国盗り物語, lit. 'Tale of acquiring countries') is a historical novel by Japanese novelist Ryōtarō Shiba. It was serialised in Sunday Mainichi (Mainichi Shimbun Publishing Inc.) from August 1963 to June 1966.

It consists of a first part starring Saito Dōsan and a second part starring Oda Nobunaga and Akechi Mitsuhide. Initially, Shiba planned to write only the story of Dōsan, but the series was too popular to be finished and Shiba was forced to write the second part, the story of Nobunaga and Mitsuhide.

Shiba skilfully incorporated the results of post-war historical studies into his novels, positioning Nobunaga as a revolutionary with a clear will, a rarity in Japanese history, and establishing an image of Nobunaga in which light and shadow coexist by not only evaluating his innovativeness but also criticising his brutality. Thanks in part to Shiba's contributions, Nobunaga, who had not always been popular before, became one of the most popular historical figures in Japan.

Two TV drama adaptations have been produced by NHK and TV Tokyo.

== Taiga drama ==
Kunitori Monogatari
- Genre: Taiga drama
- Written by: Yasuko Ohno
- Starring: Mikijirō Hira; Junko Ikeuchi; Keiko Matsuzaka; Shigeru Tsuyuguchi; Ryūtarō Ōtomo; Juzo Itami; Shôhei Hino; Joe Shishido; Yoko Yamamoto; Minoru Chiaki; Muga Takewaki; Ryōtarō Sugi; Chieko Matsubara; Tōru Emori; Kō Nishimura; Goro Ibuki; Tappie Shimokawa; Ryūzō Hayashi; Masaomi Kondō; Hideki Takahashi
- Opening theme: NHK Symphony Orchestra
- Country of origin: Japan
- Original language: Japanese
- No. of episodes: 51

Production
- Running time: 45 minutes

Original release
- Network: NHK
- Release: January 7 – December 23, 1973

Japanese television series broadcast in 1973. It is the eleventh NHK taiga drama. It had an average viewing rating of 22.4, peaking at 29.9%. All footage of the regular broadcast is lost. In 2015, videotape recordings of episodes 37 and 38 were recovered.

=== Plot ===
The series is set in the Sengoku period. Based on Ryōtarō Shiba's novel of the same name.

The story chronicles the lives of Dosan Saito and Nobunaga Oda.

=== Production ===
Production Credits

- Original story – Ryōtarō Shiba
- Music – Hikaru Hayashi
- Sword fight arranger - Kunishirō Hayashi

=== Cast ===
Starring role

- Mikijirō Hira as Saitō Dōsan
- Hideki Takahashi as Oda Nobunaga

==== Saitō clan ====
- Yoshiko Mita as Miyoshino
- Keiko Matsuzaka as Nōhime
- Gō Wakabayashi as Saitō Yoshitatsu
- Gorō Ōishi as Saitō Tatsuoki

==== Oda clan ====
- Minoru Chiaki as Oda Nobuhide
- Yōko Minamikaze as Dota Gozen
- Chieko Matsubara as Oichi
- Jun Tazaki as Hirate Masahide
- Joe Shishido as Shibata Katsuie
- Yūki Meguro as Maeda Toshiie

==== Akechi clan ====
- Masaomi Kondō as Akechi Mitsuhide
- Ryoko Nakano as Mitsuhide's wife
- Hiroko Hayashi as Tama, Mitsuhide's daughter
- Akira Kume as Akechi Mitsuyasu
- Seiichiro Kameishi as Saitō Toshimitsu

==== Hashiba clan ====
- Shôhei Hino as Hashiba Hideyoshi
- Kiwako Taichi as Nene
- Goichi Yamada as Hachisuka Koroku
- Masakane Yonekura as Takenaka Hanbei
- Taizō Sayama as Sakichi

==== Kuroda clan ====
- Tōru Emori as Kuroda Kanbei
- Iroha as Shōjumaru
- Sumio Takatsu as Mori Tahei
- Hiroshi Iwashita as Kuriyama Zensuke

==== Tokugawa clan ====
- Akira Terao as Tokugawa Ieyasu
- Jō Kurashima as Honda Tadakatsu

==== Azai clan ====
- Ryōtarō Sugi as Azai Nagamasa
- Shoko Nakazawa as Chacha
- Rieko Sugai as Hatsu

==== Toki clan ====
- Ryūnosuke Kaneda as Toki Yorinari
- Noboru Nakaya as Toki Yoritake, Yorinari's brother

==== Ashikaga shogunate ====
- Muga Takewaki as Ashikaga Yoshiteru
- Juzo Itami as Ashikaga Yoshiaki
- Goro Ibuki as Hosokawa Fujitaka
- Nobuyuki Ishida as Hosokawa Tadaoki

==== Others ====
- Shigeru Tsuyuguchi as Iga Ninja: Tsuzura Juzo
- Ryūtarō Ōtomo as Takeda Shingen
- Ritsu Ishiyama as Takeda Katsuyori, Shingen's heir
- Yoshiaki Hanayagi as Imagawa Yoshimoto
- Ryūzō Hayashi as Suzuki Magoichi
- Takahiko Tōno as Yamauchi Kazutoyo
- Fumie Kashiyama as Chiyo, Kazutoyo's wife
- Akira Nagoya as Gonzō Kani

== Shinshun Wide Jidaigeki ==
The drama was broadcast on 2 January 2005 in the Shinshun Wide Jidaigeki slot as part of TV Tokyo's 40th anniversary celebrations. The broadcast time was over 12 hours for the entire episode.
