= Hissatsu Kengekinin =

Japanese TV drama series

- Also known as: 必殺剣劇人
- Genre: Jidaigeki
- Directed by: Youichi Harada; Shigeru Ishihara
- Starring: Masaomi Kondō; Ken Tanaka; Teruhiko Aoi; Yuki Kudo
- Country of origin: Japan
- Original language: Japanese
- No. of episodes: 8

Production
- Producers: Hisashi Yamauchi; Yozō Sakurai
- Running time: 45 minutes (per episode)
- Production companies: Asahi, Shochiku

Original release
- Network: TV Asahi
- Release: August 7 – September 25, 1987

Hissatsu Kengekinin (必殺剣劇人) is a Japanese television jidaigeki or period drama that was broadcast in 1987. It is the 29th in the Hissatsu series.

== Cast ==
- Masaomi Kondō as Karuta no Ayataro
- Ken Tanaka as hayanawa no Seiji
- Teruhiko Aoi as Sutasuta no Matsubouzu
- Sayoko Ninomiya as Outa
- Yuki Kudo as Oshichi
