= Mizusawa Domain =

Feudal domain in Mutsu Province, Japan

The Mizusawa Domain (水沢藩, Mizusawa han) was a feudal domain in Mutsu Province of Japan (present-day Mizusawa-ward, Ōshū, Iwate) during the Edo period. It was a subdomain (支藩) of the Sendai Domain. Sometimes it was suggested that the domain be called "Naka-Tsuyama han" (中津山藩). The domain as a separate entity was ultimately short-lived, eventually being reabsorbed into Sendai territory.

Early during the rule of the Date clan, the area was under the care of Shiroishi Munezane.

Among those originally from this domain are Rangaku scholar Takano Chōei, politician Gotō Shimpei and admiral Saitō Makoto.
