= Kagerō no Tsuji: Inemuri Iwane Edo Zōshi =

Japanese television series

- Genre: Jidaigeki
- Starring: Koji Yamamoto; Noriko Nakagoshi; Yuko Fueki; Rei Dan; Ikkei Watanabe; Masao Komatsu; Masaomi Kondō
- Country of origin: Japan
- Original language: Japanese
- No. of seasons: 3
- No. of episodes: 37

Original release
- Network: NHK
- Release: July 19, 2007 – January 1, 2010

Kagerō no Tsuji: Inemuri Iwane Edo Zōshi (陽炎の辻〜居眠り磐音 江戸双紙〜) is a (2007-2010) Japanese television series, first shown on NHK on July 19, 2007, based on the Inemuri Iwane novels by Yasuhide Saeki.

== Cast ==
- Koji Yamamoto as Sakazaki Iwane
- Noriko Nakagoshi as Okon
- Ikkei Watanabe as Imazuya Kichiemon
- Masaomi Kondō as Yoshizō
- Rei Dan as Oen
- Hiromi Kitagawa as Osaki
- Yuko Fueki as Kobayashi Nao
- Shun Shioya as Kobayashi Kinpei
- Sei Hiraizumi as Sakazaki Masayoshi
- Masao Komatsu as Kinbei
- Natsuki Harada as Okine
- Riki Takeuchi as Sakai Taizō
