= Ichikawa Gakuen =

Coordinates: 35°43′56.9″N 139°56′49.9″E

Ichikawa Junior-Senior High School
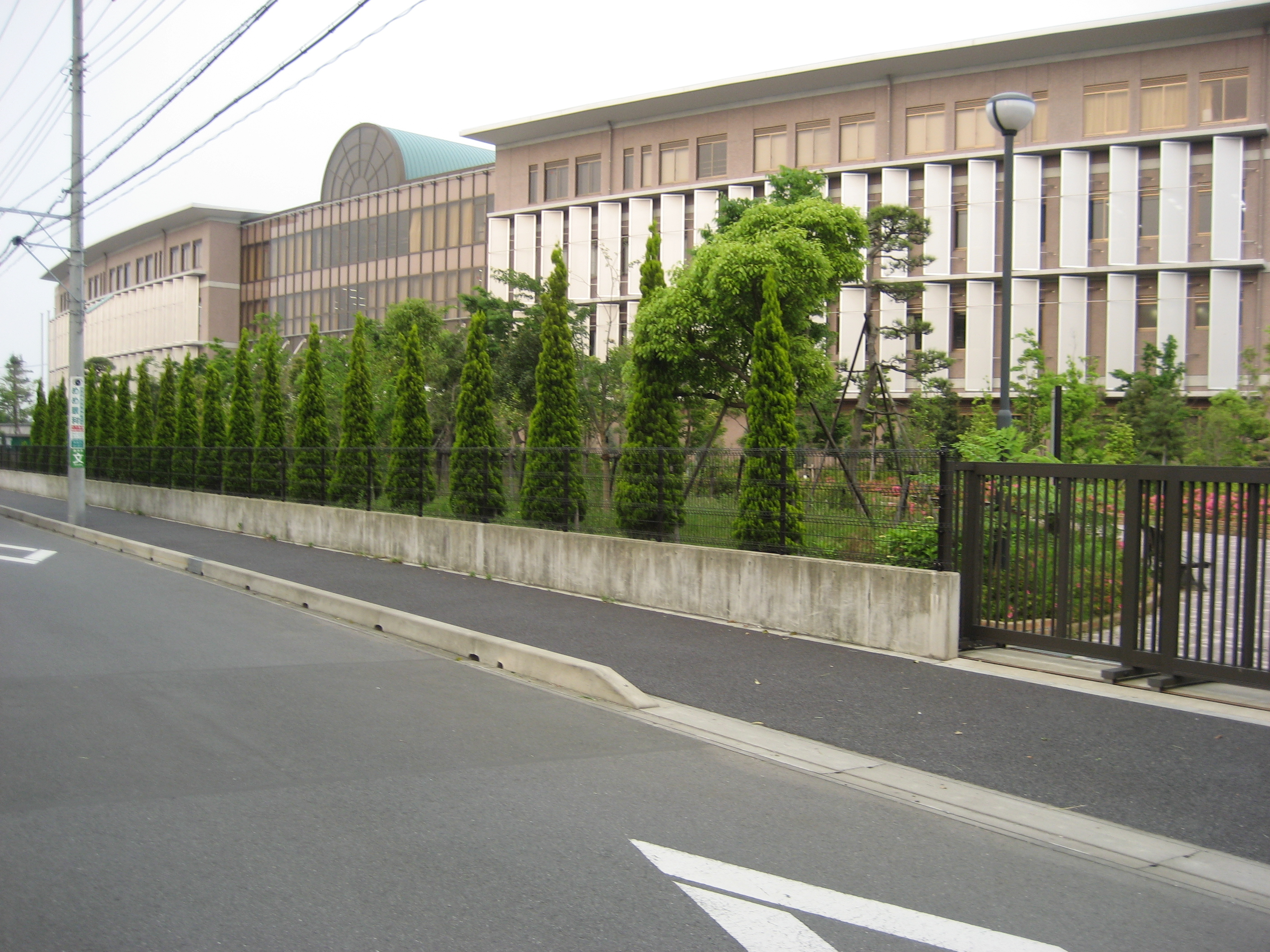
- Front of Ichikawa Gakuen
- 2-38-1 Motokitakata, Ichikawa, Chiba 〒272-0816; Japan

Information
- Type: High school
- Established: 1937
- Grades: 7-9 (JH), 10-12 (HS)
- Website: www.ichigaku.ac.jp

Ichikawa Junior and Senior High School (市川中学校・高等学校, Ichikawa Gakuen) is a private school in Moto-kita-kata (本北方), Ichikawa, Chiba, Japan. The school is sometimes mistaken for a public school due to its name: Ichikawa Junior High School, Ichikawa High School or Ichikawa for short. The private school is managed by the Ichikawa Gakuen School Corporation.

== History ==
In 1937, Yonekichi Koga (古賀米吉 Koga Yonekichi) opened the school in Yawata-aza-shinden (currently known as Higashi-sugano 4-chome), Ichikawa, Chiba. That was the beginning of Ichikawa Gakuen. The school had only male students since after the last war; however, the school became coeducational when the school moved to its present location in the spring of 2003.

The school has relationships with John McGlashan College in Dunedin, New Zealand, as well as others in Shanghai, China, the Philippines and Nanaimo, British Columbia, Canada.

== Incidents ==
In 2026, a male student was caught on camera smearing semen on a female student's lunch box, and the video evidence was leaked online, sparking widespread attention.

== Famous alumni ==
- Hideki Takahashi - actor
- Kenta Satoi - actor

== Other ==
The school also manages three kindergartens in the Ichikawa area.

== Gallery ==
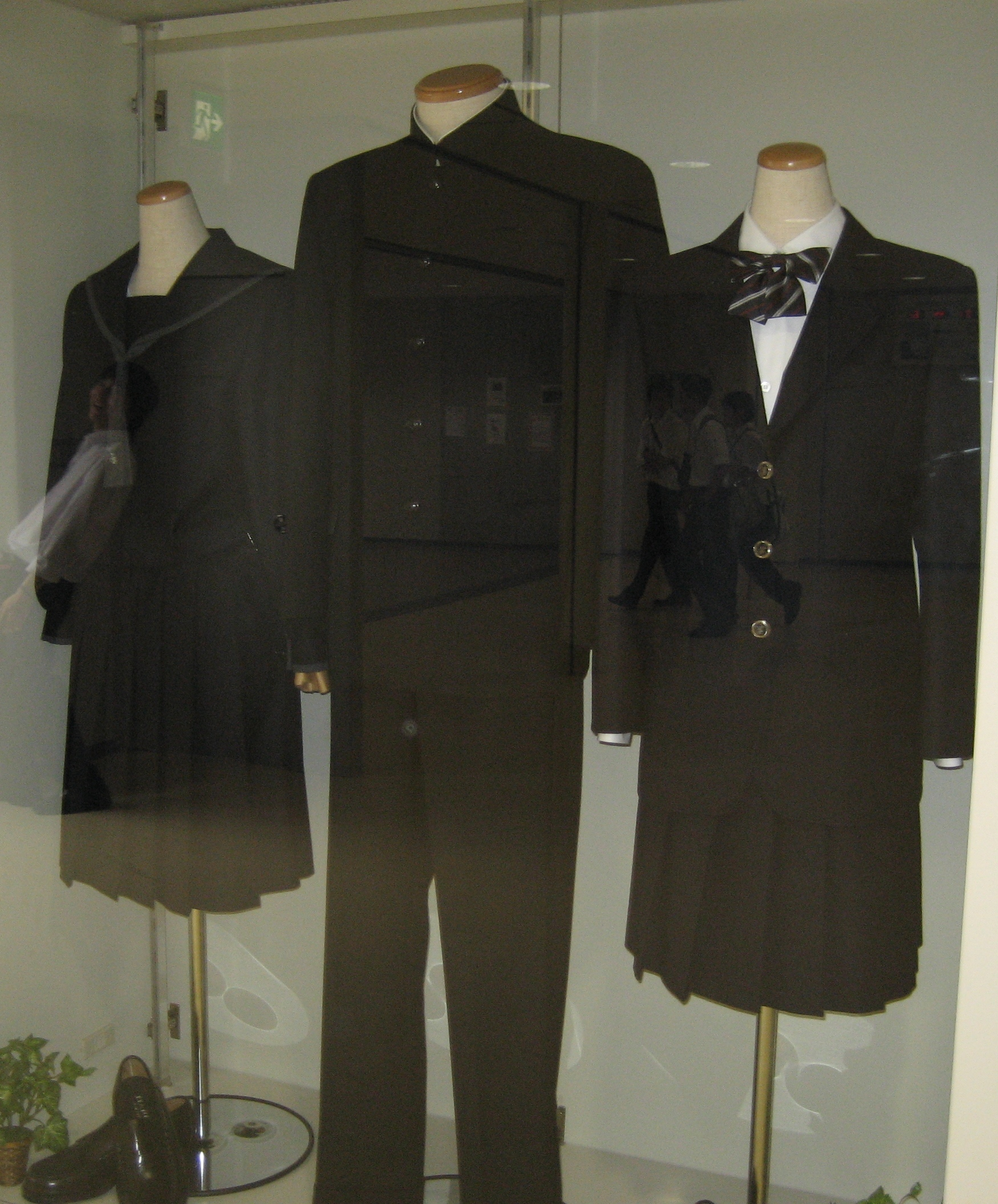
Ichikawa Gakuen School Uniform

South wing of Ichikawa Gakuen
