= Isamu Nagato =

Japanese actor and voice actor (1932–2013)

- Born: 1 January 1932; Kurashiki, Okayama Prefecture, Japan
- Died: 4 June 2013 (aged 81)
- Occupation: Actor
- Years active: 1948–2013

Isamu Nagato (長門 勇, Nagato Isamu; 1 January 1932 – 4 June 2013) was a Japanese actor from Kurashiki Okayama Prefecture. He was an actor who specialized in playing comical roles. He became popular for his role as Sakura Kyōjyurō in the Three Outlaw Samurai series.

== Selected filmography ==
=== Films ===
- Taiyō Umi o Someru toki (1961) as Rice
- Mekishiko Mushuku (1962) as Ankō
- Samurai from Nowhere (1964) as Misawa Ihei
- Three Outlaw Samurai (1964) as Sakura Kyōjyurō
- Akumyō Ichidai (1967)
- Lady Sazen and the Drenched Swallow Sword (1969) as Gamou Taiken
- Bloodstained Clan Honor (1970) as Taishō
- Tora-san Goes Religious? (1983) as Osakaya
- Hei no Naka no Purei Boru (1987)
- Shōrishatachi (1992)
- Ambition Without Honor (1996)
- Blooming Again (2004) as Sakiyama Rokubei
- Mrs. (2005) as Yamamoto Tatsuo

=== Television drama ===
- Three Outlaw Samurai (1963–69)
- Hana no Shōgai (1963) as Kanroku
- Haru no Sakamichi (1971) as Yoya
- The Water Margin (1973) as Lu Zhishen
- Kaze to Kumo to Niji to (1976) as Taira no Yoshikane
- Seishi Yokomizo Series (1978) as Detective Hiyori
- Akō Rōshi (1979) as Kumo no Jinjyurō
- Kage no Gundan II (1981–82) as Gohei
- MUSASHI (2003) as Hōzōin In'ei
