= Asao Sano =

Japanese actor (1925–2022)

- 佐野 浅夫
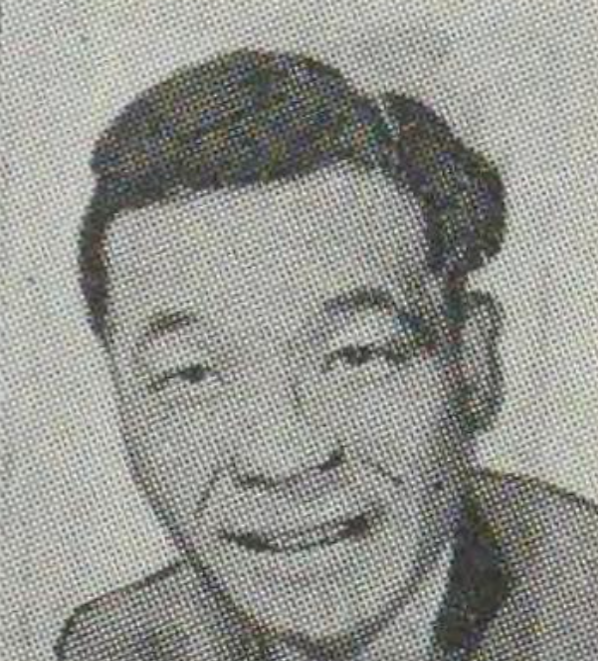
- Sano in 1962
- Born: 佐野 淺雄; 13 August 1925; Yokohama, Kanagawa Prefecture, Japan
- Died: 28 June 2022 (aged 96); Kyoto, Japan
- Occupation: Actor
- Years active: 1943–2022
- Known for: 3rd generation "Mito Kōmon" actor
- Awards: Order of the Sacred Treasure (1996)

Asao Sano (佐野 浅夫, Sano Asao; 13 August 1925 – 28 June 2022) was a Japanese actor. He was known for playing the role of Tokugawa Mitsukuni on the television jidaigeki series Mito Kōmon. Sano died on 28 June 2022, at the age of 96.

== Selected filmography ==
=== Film ===
- Listen to the Voices of the Sea (1950)
- Season of the Sun (1956)
- Black River (1957)
- Fires on the Plain (1959)
- Ballad of the Cart (1959)
- Burari Bura-bura Monogatari (1962)
- The Long Death (1964)
- A Chain of Islands (1965)
- Carmen from Kawachi (1966)
- Fighting Elegy (1966)
- A Warm Misty Night (1967)
- The Sands of Kurobe (1968)
- Apart from Life (1970)
- The Last Samurai (1974)
- Cops vs. Thugs (1976)
- Tora-san's Sunrise and Sunset (1976)
- The Incident (1978)
- Nichiren (1979)
- Kagero-za (1981)
- The Funeral (1984)
- Ooinaru Kan (1998)

=== Television ===
- Ten to Chi to (1969)
- Katsu Kaishū (1974)
- Kaze to Kumo to Niji to (1976)
- Mito Kōmon (1993–2000) as Tokugawa Mitsukuni

=== Voice acting ===
- Lawrence of Arabia (1978 Nippon TV edition) – General Edmund Allenby (Jack Hawkins)
