= Tokugawa Ieyasu (TV series) =

1983 Japanese television series

- Genre: taiga drama
- Written by: Mieko Osanai
- Directed by: Yasuo Shibuya
- Starring: Sakae Takita; Shinobu Otake; Kōji Yakusho; Masaomi Kondō; Hiroshi Katsuno; Kimiko Ikegami; Shin Takuma; Ken Tanaka; Shinjirō Ehara; Taketoshi Naito; Mariko Fuji; Misako Tanaka; Kenji Takaoka; Minori Terada; Kazuko Yoshiyuki; Misako Konno; Gō Wakabayashi; Yōsuke Natsuki; Yoichi Hayashi; Mikio Narita; Masahiko Tsugawa; Raita Ryū; Hiroyuki Nagato; Kaoru Yachigusa; Takeshi Kaga; Keiju Kobayashi; Tetsuya Takeda; Keiko Takeshita; Masako Natsume; Onoe Tatsunosuke I Kōji Ishizaka
- Opening theme: NHK Symphony Orchestra
- Composer: Isao Tomita
- Country of origin: Japan
- Original language: Japanese
- No. of episodes: 50

Production
- Running time: 45 minutes

Original release
- Network: NHK
- Release: January 9 – December 18, 1983

Tokugawa Ieyasu (徳川 家康) is a 1983 Japanese television series. It is the 21st NHK taiga drama. The drama is based on the novel of the same name by Sōhachi Yamaoka.

== Plot ==
The work is set during the Sengoku period going into the early Edo period.

The story chronicles the life of Tokugawa Ieyasu from before his birth until his death.

== Production ==
Production Credits

- Original – Sōhachi Yamaoka
- Music – Isao Tomita
- Narrator – Naomitsu Tateno
- Historical research – Keizō Suzuki
- Sword fight arranger - Kunishirō Hayashi

== Casting ==
=== Ieyasu ===
Generally, due to the image of Tokugawa Ieyasu being petite and chubby, casting proved to be challenging. Before long, within the production team, the desire to create a new image of Ieyasu grew stronger, and the tall Sakae Takita was chosen for the role.

=== Hideyoshi ===
Due to the strong desire of Mieko Osanai, who is also a scriptwriter for Kinpachi-sensei, Tetsuya Takeda played the role of Hideyoshi. He was mentioned as one of the leading candidates for the role of Hideyoshi in the 1981 NHK Taiga drama Onna Taikōki as well.

=== Nobunaga ===
Initially, the role of Nobunaga was offered to popular singer and actor Kenji Sawada. However, he was too busy, and scheduling proved to be difficult. Eventually, just one week before the casting announcement, it was decided that he was unable to participate. NHK gave up on casting a big-name actor and instead, at the time still relatively unknown, chose Koji Yakusho for the role. From there, he quickly rose to fame and became a popular actor.

== Cast ==
=== Starring role ===
- Sakae Takita as Tokugawa Ieyasu (episodes 7-50)
  - Yoshitaka Kase as child Ieyasu (episodes 3-5)
  - Yōji Matsuda as teen Ieyasu (episode 6)

=== Tokugawa clan ===
- Shinobu Otake as Odai no Kata - Ieyasu's mother
- Masaomi Kondō as Matsudaira Hirotada - Ieyasu's father
- Kaoru Yachigusa as Keyōin - Ieyasu's grandmother
- Kimiko Ikegami as Lady Tsukiyama - Ieyasu's wife
- Hiroshi Katsuno as Tokugawa Hidetada - Ieyasu's third son
- Hiroyuki Nagato as Honda Sakuzaemon
- Shinjirō Ehara as Ishikawa Kazumasa
- Taketoshi Naito as Honda Masanobu
- Yosuke Natsuki as Yagyū Munenori
- Hirotarō Honda as Honda Masazumi
- Sen Yamamoto as Itakura Katsushige
- Seiji Miyaguchi as Torii Tadayoshi
- Sei Hiraizumi as Ii Naomasa
- Kōsuke Toyohara as Ii Naomasa (young)
- Katsumasa Uchida as Sakakibara Yasumasa
- Masuyo Iwamoto as Asahi-hime - Ieyasu's second wife
- Keiko Takeshita as Lady Saigō - Ieyasu's concubine
- Ken Tanaka as Matsudaira Tadateru - Ieyasu's sixth son
- Masahiko Tsugawa as Ōkubo Nagayasu
- Junkichi Orimoto as Ōkubo Tadayo
- Hideyuki Hori as Yūki Hideyasu - Ieyasu's second son
- Jouji Nakata as Ōkubo Tadakazu

=== Oda clan ===
- Kōji Yakusho as Oda Nobunaga
- Takao Itō as Oda Nobuhide
- Mariko Fuji as Nōhime
- Minori Terada as Akechi Mitsuhide
- Rokko Toura as Hirate Masahide

=== Toyotomi clan ===
- Tetsuya Takeda as Toyotomi Hideyoshi
- Kazuko Yoshiyuki as Nene - Hideyoshi's wife
- Mitsue Suzuki as Ōmandokoro - Hideyoshi's mother
- Masako Natsume as Yodo-dono - Hideyoshi's concubine
- Gō Rijū as Toyotomi Hideyori - Hideyoshi's son
- Mariko Ishihara as Senhime - Hideyori's wife
- Takeshi Kaga as Ishida Mitsunari
- Yūsuke Kawazu as Shima Sakon
- Akira Kume as Katagiri Katsumoto
- Yasunori Irikawa as Kuroda Kanbei
- Junpei Morita as Asano Yoshinaga

Council of Five Elders

- Tetsurō Sagawa as Maeda Toshiie
- Shinsuke Mikimoto as Mōri Terumoto
- Tōru Yokoi as Uesugi Kagekatsu
- Mitsuo Hamada as Ukita Hideie

=== Imagawa clan ===
- Mikio Narita as Imagawa Yoshimoto
- Yoichi Hayashi as Imagawa Ujizane
- Keiju Kobayashi as Sessai Choro, Ieyasu's master

=== Takeda clan ===
- Kei Satō as Takeda Shingen
- Shinji Tōdō as Takeda Katsuyori
- Shōbun Inoue as Yamagata Masakage
- Takeo Namai as Anayama Nobukimi

=== Others ===
- Gō Wakabayashi as Sanada Yukimura
- Goro Ibuki as Katō Kiyomasa
- Katsuhiko Watabiki as Fukushima Masanori
- Hiroshi Arikawa as Ōtani Yoshitsugu
- Jun Tazaki as Shimazu Yoshihiro
- Onoe Tatsunosuke I as Date Masamune
- Kōji Ishizaka as Naya Shōan (fictional character)
- Misako Konno as Kinomi (fictional character)
- Gorō Mutsumi as Naoe Kanetsugu
- Masami Horiuchi as Kobayakawa Hideaki
- Yūsuke Takita as Ankokuji Ekei
- Raita Ryū as Tenkai
- Jin Nakayama as Chaya Shirōjirō Kiyonobu
- Daisaku Shinohara as Ashikaga Yoshiaki, the final shōgun of the Ashikaga shogunate

== TV schedule ==
Episode	Original airdate	Title	Directed by	Rating
1	January 9, 1983	"Takechiyo Tanjō" (竹千代誕生)	Makoto Ōhara	34.9%
2	January 16, 1983	"Ribetsu" (離別)	Ikuo Katō	35.2%
3	January 23, 1983	"Hitojichi Ryakudatsu" (人質略奪)	Maorimasa Matsumoto	33.0%
4	January 30, 1983	"Ninjū Mugen" (忍従無限)	Makoto Ōhara	37.4%
5	February 6, 1983	"Hitojichi Kōkan" (人質交換)	Ikuo Katō	36.0%
6	February 13, 1983	"Shiren no Toki" (試練の時)	Maorimasa Matsumoto	35.5%
7	February 20, 1983	"Uijin" (初陣)	Makoto Ōhara	36.2%
8	February 27, 1983	"Okehazama" (桶狭間)	Ikuo Katō	35.9%
9	March 6, 1983	"Okazaki Nyūjō" (岡崎入城)	Maorimasa Matsumoto	33.0%
10	March 13, 1983	"Mikawa Ikkō-ikki" (三河一向一揆)	Makoto Ōhara	34.5%
11	March 20, 1983	"Kōbō no Shiro" (興亡の城)	Masahide Kanetoshi	29.9%
12	March 27, 1983	"Jinsei no Kiro" (人生の岐路)	Ikuo Katō	36.1%
13	April 3, 1983	"Mikatagahara Kassen" (三方ヶ原合戦)	Makoto Ōhara	28.0%
14	April 10, 1983	"Chichi to Ko" (父と子)	Maorimasa Matsumoto	30.2%
15	April 17, 1983	"Inbō" (陰謀)	Masahide Kanetoshi	27.3%
16	April 24, 1983	"Mujō no Kaze" (無情の風)	Ikuo Katō	33.3%
17	May 1, 1983	"Muketsu no Shōri" (無血の勝利)	Kazutaka Kunihiro	27.8%
18	May 8, 1983	"Muhon Hakkaku" (謀叛発覚)	Makoto Ōhara	33.2%
19	May 15, 1983	"Nagashino no Tatakai" (長篠の戦)	Maorimasa Matsumoto	34.7%
20	May 22, 1983	"Nandai" (難題)	Masahide Kanetoshi	32.4%
21	May 29, 1983	"Nobuyasu Tsuihō" (信康追放)	Ikuo Katō	29.2%
22	June 5, 1983	"Rakka Ujō" (落花有情)	Maorimasa Matsumoto	27.5%
23	June 12, 1983	"Azuchi eno Michi" (安土への道)	Masahide Kanetoshi	35.0%
24	June 19, 1983	"Honnō-ji no Hen" (本能寺の変)	Makoto Ōhara	31.4%
25	June 26, 1983	"Iga-goe" (伊賀越え)	Makoto Ōhara	35.1%
26	July 3, 1983	"Tsugi ni Fuku Kaze" (次に吹く風)	Ikuo Katō	36.9%
27	July 10, 1983	"Komaki Nagakute no Tatakai" (小牧長久手の戦)	Maorimasa Matsumoto	28.9%
28	July 17, 1983	"Kazumasa Shuppon" (数正出奔)	Kazutaka Kunihiro	27.7%
29	July 24, 1983	"Mikawa no Iji" (三河の意地)	Ikuo Katō	30.6%
30	July 31, 1983	"Ryōyū Taimen" (両雄対面)	Makoto Ōhara	27.1%
31	August 7, 1983	"Tsuma naranu Haha" (妻ならぬ母)	Masahide Kanetoshi	24.4%
32	August 14, 1983	"Ieyasu Edo-iri" (家康江戸入り)	Kazutaka Kunihiro	24.5%
33	August 21, 1983	"Sen'un Ugoku" (戦雲動く)	Maorimasa Matsumoto	23.5%
34	August 28, 1983	"Kachū no Hito" (渦中の人)	Ikuo Katō	29.1%
35	September 4, 1983	"Taikō Shisu" (太閤死す)	Makoto Ōhara	28.4%
36	September 11, 1983	"Bunretsu no Me" (分裂の芽)	Maorimasa Matsumoto	29.6%
37	September 18, 1983	"Kyū-chō Mō-chō" (窮鳥猛鳥)	Kōsaku Takahashi	29.8%
38	September 25, 1983	"Ki wa Jukusu" (機は熟す)	Ikuo Katō	31.3%
39	October 2, 1983	"Sekigahara Zen'ya" (関ヶ原前夜)	Makoto Ōhara	27.7%
40	October 9, 1983	"Sekigahara" (関ヶ原)	Makoto Ōhara	29.2%
41	October 16, 1983	"Shōgun Ieyasu" (将軍家康)	Ikuo Katō	31.3%
42	October 23, 1983	"Sekai no Kaze" (世界の風)	Maorimasa Matsumoto	28.8%
43	October 30, 1983	"Renpan-jō no Yume" (連判状の夢)	Makoto Ōhara	30.1%
44	November 6, 1983	"Sōdō no Ne" (騒動の根)	Ikuo Katō	29.6%
45	November 13, 1983	"Kyojō no Yobigoe" (巨城の呼び声)	Maorimasa Matsumoto	30.3%
46	November 20, 1983	"Oi no Ketsudan" (老いの決断)	Ikuo Katō	30.2%
47	November 27, 1983	"Osaka Fuyu no Jin" (大坂 冬の陣)	Makoto Ōhara	30.6%
48	December 4, 1983	"Osaka Natsu no Jin" (大坂 夏の陣)	Maorimasa Matsumoto	29.5%
49	December 11, 1983	"Rakujō" (落城)	Ikuo Katō	31.3%
50	December 18, 1983	"Taihei eno Inori" (泰平への祈り)	Makoto Ōhara	33.1%
Average rating 31.2% - Rating is based on Japanese Video Research (Kantō region).
