= Tattooed Life =

1965 film by Seijun Suzuki

- Film poster
- Directed by: Seijun Suzuki
- Written by: Kei Hattori; Kinya Naoi
- Produced by: Masayuki Takagi
- Starring: Hideki Takahashi; Masako Izumi; Yuji Odaka
- Cinematography: Kurataro Takamura
- Edited by: Akira Suzuki
- Music by: Masayoshi Ikeda
- Production company: Nikkatsu
- Distributed by: Nikkatsu
- Release date: November 13, 1965 (Japan)
- Running time: 87 minutes
- Country: Japan
- Language: Japanese

Tattooed Life (Japanese: 刺青一代, Hepburn: Irezumi ichidai) is a 1965 yakuza action movie directed by Seijun Suzuki. The film stars Hideki Takahashi as "Silver Fox" Tetsu.

== Plot ==
The story follows the flight of yakuza hitman Tetsu and his younger, artistic brother Kenji after the latter kills a yakuza boss in a double cross. The pair is pursued by the yakuza and police as they head for Manchuria. They are swindled of their money before they can reach their destination and take labor jobs on a tunnel project, falling in love with their new boss's sister-in-law and wife, respectively.

== Cast ==
- Hideki Takahashi as Tetsutaro Murakanmi
- Masako Izumi as Midori Kinoshita
- Kotobuki Hananomoto
- Seizaburō Kawazu
- Hiroko Ito
- Kayo Matsuo
- Hōsei Komatsu
- Kaku Takashina
- Akira Yamauchi
- Yuji Odaka
- Hiroshi Chiyoda
