= Kaitō Ruby =

1988 Japanese film

- Blu-ray cover

Japanese name
- Kanji: 快盗ルビイ
- Directed by: Makoto Wada
- Written by: Makoto Wada
- Based on: "Ruby Martinson" stories by Henry Slesar
- Starring: Hiroyuki Sanada; Kyōko Koizumi; Kumi Mizuno; Hideyo Amamoto; Masumi Okada
- Cinematography: Osame Maruike
- Edited by: Isao Tomita
- Music by: Masao Yagi
- Distributed by: Toho
- Release date: November 12, 1988 (Japan)
- Running time: 96 minutes
- Country: Japan
- Language: Japanese

Kaitō Ruby (Japanese: 快盗ルビイ) is a 1988 Japanese romantic comedy film directed by Makoto Wada. It is loosely adapted from American writer Henry Slesar's stories of the bungling thief Ruby Martinson, albeit changed to a woman to serve as a star vehicle for idol Kyōko Koizumi.

== Plot ==
Toru Hayashi is a young, awkward salaryman who lives with his divorced mother. When freewheeling crime fiction fan Rumi "Ruby" Kato moves into his apartment complex, he becomes instantly smitten, and soon finds himself drawn into her wild dreams of being a master thief. Despite reservations, Toru assists Ruby in a series of bumbling "crimes" that all fail to turn any profit:

- Staging an accident to steal an old shopkeeper's bank satchel, they find it has less money than their staging expenses, and agree to return it.
- Trying a bank robbery, they are dismissed by the staff when Toru mixes up the threatening note with his mother's grocery list.
- Claiming a common earring is worth millions to scam a jeweler, they are forced to buy a matching set that the jeweler easily finds.
- Breaking into a high-priced condominium, Toru unwittingly traps himself in a bathroom, forcing Ruby to disguise as a handyman to rescue him instead of burgling it.

Following this last caper, Toru is found at Ruby's apartment by her "serious" boyfriend. An argument ensues, and Ruby sends a bitter breakup letter to her boyfriend, which she soon regrets. Reluctantly, Toru agrees to steal the letter back out of her boyfriend's mail, but is caught by a policeman during the attempt.

At the police station, Toru desperately repeats Ruby's cover story that the letter has been contaminated by a deadly pathogen, and needs immediate burning. Fortunately, the station's pathologist becomes sympathetic after "examining" (reading) the letter and does so, remarking that Toru is "either goodhearted or stupid."

Learning how far Toru has gone for her, Ruby realizes their mutual love and takes him as her new boyfriend, also resolving to give up crime. However, as they discuss promise rings, they quickly slip into a new scheme to steal two for the price of one.

== Cast ==
- Kyōko Koizumi as Rumi Kato (Ruby)
- Hiroyuki Sanada as Toru Hayashi
- Kumi Mizuno as Toru's mother
- Hideyo Amamoto as Shopkeeper
- Masumi Okada as Condo resident
- Takanori Jinnai as Rumi's friend
- Taisaku Akino as Detective
- Akira Nagoya as Pathologist

== Awards and nominations ==
31st Blue Ribbon Awards

- Won: Best Director (Makoto Wada)

13th Hochi Film Awards

- Won: Best Actor (Hiroyuki Sanada)

10th Yokohama Film Festival

- Won: Best Actor (Hiroyuki Sanada)
- Won: Best Actress (Kyōko Koizumi)
- 6th Best Film
