= Bad Girl (1963 film) =

1963 film

- Directed by: Kirio Urayama
- Written by: Yoshio Ishido; Kirio Urayama; Kei Moriyama
- Starring: Masako Izumi; Mitsuo Hamada
- Cinematography: Kurataro Takamura
- Release date: 17 March 1963
- Running time: 116 minutes
- Country: Japan
- Language: Japanese

Bad Girl (Japanese: 非行少女, Hepburn: Hiko shōjo) is a 1963 Japanese drama film directed by Kirio Urayama. It was entered into the 3rd Moscow International Film Festival, where it won a Golden Prize.

== Cast ==
- Masako Izumi as Wakae
- Mitsuo Hamada as Saburo
- Jun Hamamura
- Tanie Kitabayashi as Shizue Kita
- Toshiko Kobayashi
- Asao Koike as Taro Sawada
- Minako Kozuki
- Densuke Mitsuzawa
- Shoichi Ozawa
- Fukuko Sayo
- Toshio Takahara as Takeda
