= The Last Samurai (1974 film) =

- Film poster
- Directed by: Kenji Misumi
- Screenplay by: Takei Kunihiro; Kenji Misumi
- Based on: Sonootoko by Shōtarō Ikenami
- Produced by: Kyuzo Kobayashi; Akira Inomata
- Starring: Hideki Takahashi; Ken Ogata; Masaomi Kondō; Keiko Matsuzaka; Asao Sano; Teruhiko Saigō; Kenji Imai; Kiwako Taichi; Takahiro Tamura
- Cinematography: Masao Kosugi
- Edited by: Yoshi Sugihara
- Music by: Akira Ifukube
- Distributed by: Shōchiku
- Release date: September 21, 1974 (Japan)
- Running time: 159 minutes
- Country: Japan
- Language: Japanese

The Last Samurai (Japanese: 狼よ落日を斬れ, Hepburn: Ōkami yo Rakujitsu o Kire) is a 1974 Japanese period drama film, directed by Kenji Misumi. It is based on Shōtarō Ikenami's novel Sonootoko. The Last Samurai was Misumi's final film.

== Plot ==
Set at the end of the Edo period in Kyoto. Sugi, a young samurai, finds a new father in the person of Ikemoto, from whom he learns the art of the sword (Mugai ryu). Ikemoto, a spy in the pay of the Tokugawa shogun, sensing that the end of the samurai world is near, implores Sugi to stay away from the political struggles and violent conflicts. However, Sugi makes friends with four samurai. A ruthless fate is waiting for them.

== Cast ==
- Hideki Takahashi : Toranosuke Sugi
- Ken Ogata : Hanjirō Nakamura / Kirino Toshiaki
- Takahiro Tamura : Mohei Ikemoto
- Masaomi Kondō : Hachiro Iba
- Kiwako Taichi : Ohide
- Keiko Matsuzaka : Reiko
- Jūkei Fujioka as Murata
- Teruhiko Saigō : Okita Sōji
- Jirō Sakagami
- Taketoshi Naito : Sugi Hirazaemon
- Tōru Minegishi : Aizawa
- Asao Sano : Kingoro Yamaguchi
- Ryutaro Tatsumi : Takamori Saigo
- Kenji Imai : Togo Naoji
