= Akira Nagoya =

Japanese actor (1930–2003)

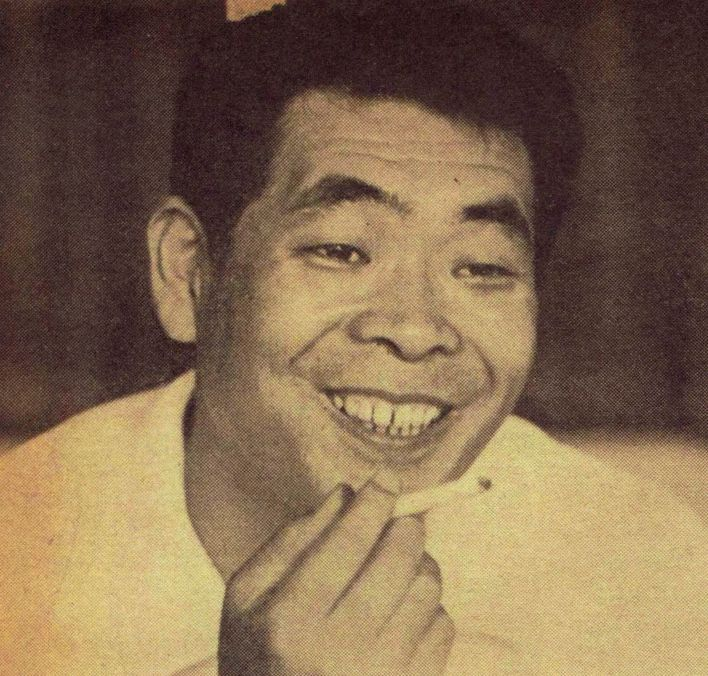
- Born: 8 December 1930; Tokyo, Japan
- Died: 24 June 2003 (aged 72)
- Occupation: Actor
- Years active: 1949–2003

Akira Nagoya (名古屋章, Nagoya Akira; 8 December 1930 – 24 June 2003) was a Japanese actor. Nagoya was an actor who specialized in playing comical roles. He is known for playing the role of Yūtarō Asahina in the tokusatsu superhero series Ultraman Taro.

== Filmography ==
=== Films ===
- Non-chan Kumo ni Noru (1955) as Driver
- Akitsu Springs (1960) as Shimamura
- High and Low (1963) as Yamamoto (Detective)
- Shitamachi no Taiyō (1963) as Kazama
- Sweet Sweat (1964) as Jirō
- Blood and Sand (1965) as Nezu
- Flying Phantom Ship (1969) as Technician Arashiyama (voice)
- The Human Revolution (1973) as Kurikawa
- Tidal Wave (1973) as D-2 Security
- Shunkinshō (1976) as Densuke
- Mr- Mrs- Ms- Lonely (1980) as Hanamori
- Station (1981) as Takada
- Dotonbori River (1982) as Katsu-san
- Suspicion (1982) as Iwasaki
- Mahjong hōrōki (1984)
- Baby Elephant Story: The Angel Who Descended to Earth (1986) as Shoichi Takahashi
- Kaitō Ruby (1988) as Man with white cloth
- Tsuribaka Nisshi (1988) as Noguchi
- Princess Goh (1992) as Torii
- Marutai no Onna (1997) as Hatano
- Princess Mononoke (1997) as The cattleman leader (voice)

=== Television drama ===
- Taikōki (1965)
- Ten to Chi to (1969) as Yosaburō Kakizaki
- Return of Ultraman (1971–72) (Narrator)
- Ultraman Taro (1973–74) as Yūtarō Asahina
- Kunitori Monogatari (1973) as Gonzō Kani
- Oretachi no Tabi (1975) as Daigorō Sakata
- School Wars: Hero (1984) as Kuniyasu Iwasa
- Shūchakueki Series (1996-2004) as Sakamoto
- The Unfettered Shogun (1999-2003) as Hikozaemon Arima

=== Japanese dub ===
- Toy Story (1995) as Mr. Potato Head
- Toy Story 2 (1999) as Mr. Potato Head
