= Fighting Elegy =

1966 Japanese film

- Directed by: Seijun Suzuki
- Written by: Kaneto Shindō; Takashi Suzuki (novel)
- Produced by: Kazu Otsuka
- Starring: Hideki Takahashi; Junko Asano; Yûsuke Kawazu
- Cinematography: Kenji Hagiwara
- Edited by: Mutsuo Tanji
- Music by: Naozumi Yamamoto
- Production company: Nikkatsu
- Distributed by: Nikkatsu
- Release date: 9 November 1966 (Japan)
- Running time: 86 minutes
- Country: Japan
- Language: Japanese

Fighting Elegy (けんかえれじい, Kenka erejii), also titled Elegy to Violence and The Born Fighter, is a 1966 Japanese drama film directed by Seijun Suzuki. It is based on the novel Kenka erejii by Takashi Suzuki.

== Plot ==
Kiroku Nanbu is a Catholic teenager attending a military-tooled middle school in 1935 Bizen, Okayama. Living in a boardinghouse, he is infatuated with his landlady's chaste daughter, Michiko. Unable to express his feelings or his sexual desire, Nanbu turns to violent behaviour.

Taken under the wing of schoolmate Turtle, Nanbu is taught how to fight through an elaborate training regimen. He then joins a school gang, the OSMS. A conflict between gang leader Takuan and Turtle ensues concluding with Nanbu's usurpation of OSMS leadership. Setting a more aggressive manifesto of actively breaking all school rules, and avoiding girls entirely, he has a run-in with the school drill sergeant and is suspended. Turtle speaks to the school administration on Nanbu's behalf resulting in both students fleeing Okayama, leaving Michiko behind.

Now living in Aizuwakamatsu, Fukushima with his aunt and uncle, Nanbu reenlists in school but is repulsed by his classmates' weakness. He forms a new group, and heightened conflicts commence with a local gang. Michiko visits to say goodbye to Nanbu and tell him that she has decided to join a convent as she is unable to bear children. She is later waylaid by marching soldiers. Distraught to new heights, Nanbu spots a poster for radical political activist Ikki Kita, whom he had met briefly in a tea house, and, reinvigorated, marches on to join in the February 26 Incident.

== Cast ==
- Hideki Takahashi – Kiroku Nanbu
- Junko Asano – Michiko
- Yūsuke Kawazu – Turtle
- Mitsuo Kataoka – Takuan
- Chikako Miyagi – Yoshino Nanbu
- Isao Tamagawa – Principal of Kitakata J.H.S.
- Keisuke Noro – Kaneda
- Asao Sano – Kondo
- Hiroshi Midorigawa – Ikki Kita
- Seijiro Onda – Kiroku's father

== Production ==
Takashi Suzuki's novel was adapted by filmmaker Kaneto Shindō. During filming, Suzuki took many liberties with Shindō's script, adding scenes such as Nanbu's meeting with Ikki Kita and the violation of Michiko.

The events of the film cover only the first half of the novel on which it was based. Suzuki had planned and co-written the script for a sequel, in which Nanbu joins the army and dies in battle in China, but the project was cancelled after Suzuki was fired by Nikkatsu after his next film Branded to Kill.

== Legacy ==
Fighting Elegy was screened at the Museum of Modern Art in 2005, at the Harvard Film Archive in 2016 and at the Berkeley Art Museum and Pacific Film Archive in 2022.
