= Lady Sazen and the Drenched Swallow Sword =

- Film poster
- Directed by: Kimiyoshi Yasuda
- Produced by: Yashiro Yamato
- Starring: Michiyo Okusu; Kōjirō Hongō; Takashi Kanda; Asao Koike; Kayo Mikimoto; Isamu Nagato
- Cinematography: Hiroshi Imai
- Edited by: Hiroshi Yamada
- Music by: Michiaki Watanabe
- Production company: Daiei
- Release date: 1969
- Running time: 76 minutes
- Country: Japan
- Language: Japanese

Lady Sazen and the Drenched Swallow Sword (Japanese: 女左膳 濡れ燕片手斬り, Hepburn: Onna Sazen nuretsubame katategiri) (also known as Left Fencer) is a 1969 Japanese samurai drama and action film, directed by Kimiyoshi Yasuda. Michiyo Okusu plays the role of the one-eyed, one-armed swords-woman O-kin. This film follows in the series of films about Tange Sazen, but this one features a female version of the Sazen—Lady Sazen.

== Plot ==
Many years ago, ronin hired by Lord Daizen-dayu killed the parents of a young girl named O-kin, then crippled her by cutting off her right arm and gouging out her right eye. Nevertheless, O-kin grows up and becomes a great swords-woman. Despite her mutilated body, she becomes unbeatable. Now she lives in a small town and owns/wields a very valuable and rare sword – The Drenched Swallow.

A girl named O-mitsu has been led to believe that she will become a maid in a Lord's castle, but is instead taken to a temple where she is sexually degraded by the Head Priest. She escapes and is being pursued by hired Yakuza when O-kin appears and saves her. The Head Priest and the Lord (who is in cahoots with each other) are eager to silence O-mitsu, so they begin a massive manhunt for both her and O-kin, leading O-kin to cut her way to the heart of a massive conspiracy involving corrupt religious leaders and government officials, the Yakuza and the Lord who killed O-kin's parents and disfigured her body.

== Cast ==
- Michiyo Okusu as Lady Sazen O-kin (credited as Michiyo Yasuda)
- Kōjirō Hongō
- Takashi Kanda
- Asao Koike
- Kayo Mikimoto
- Isamu Nagato
- Sōnosuke Sawamura
