= Youki Kudoh =

Japanese actress and singer (born 1971)

- Born: 17 January 1971 (age 55); Hachiōji, Tokyo, Japan
- Occupation: Actress
- Years active: 1984–present

Youki Kudoh (工藤 夕貴, Kudō Yūki; born 17 January 1971) is a Japanese actress and singer. She won the award for best newcomer at the 6th Yokohama Film Festival for The Crazy Family. She also won the awards for best actress at the 16th Hochi Film Award and at the 1992 Blue Ribbon Award for War and Youth. Additionally, Kudoh has been nominated three times for Best Actress, in the 5th independent Spirit Award for Mystery Train, in the 15th Japanese Academy Prize for War and Youth, and in the 4th Golden Satellite Award for Snow Falling on Cedars.

== Filmography ==
=== Films ===
Year	Title	Role	Notes
1984	The Crazy Family (逆噴射家族)	Erika Kobayashi	
1985	Typhoon Club (台風クラブ)	Rie Takami	
1985	Congratulatory Speech (祝辞)	Fusae Saotome	
1987	From a Girl's Highschool Manual (本場ぢょしこうマニュアル 初恋微熱篇)	Michiko Sawaki	
1988	Labyrinth of Flower Garden (花園の迷宮)	Fuyumi	
1988	Blue Mountains '88 (青い山脈'88)	Shinko Terazawa	
1989	Mystery Train	Mitsuko	
1991	War and Youth (戦争と青春)	Yukari Hanafusa/Sakiko	
1994	Picture Bride	Riyo	
1997	Heaven's Burning	Midori	
1999	Snow Falling on Cedars	Hatsue Imada Miyamoto	
2000	Blood: The Last Vampire	Saya (voice)	Anime film
2003	The Wind Carpet (فرش باد)	Kinue Nagai	Also associate producer
2005	Memoirs of a Geisha	Pumpkin	
2006	Granny Gabai (佐賀のがばいばあちゃん)	Akihiro's mother	
2007	Rush Hour 3	Jasmine (Dragon Lady)	
2008	L: Change the World	Kimiko Kujo (K)	
2008	Haru yo koi (春よこい)	Yoshie Ozaki	
2009	The Limits of Control	Molecules	
2010	Zatoichi: The Last (座頭市 THE LAST)	Toyo	
2011	Poem of the Earth: The Story of Kosuke Tomeoka (大地の詩 -留岡幸助物語-)	Natsuko Tomeoka	
2012	Karakara	Junko	
2015	When I Was Most Beautiful (この国の空)	Satoko's mother	
2016	The Actor (俳優 亀岡拓次)	Fujii	
2017	Green Music (緑色音楽)	Mieko	
2018	We Are (青の帰り道)	Saeko	
2019	We Are Little Zombies	Rie Ota	
2019	The Brighton Miracle	Nellie Jones	
2026	Diary of a Mad Old Man	Hana	

=== Television ===
Year	Title	Role	Notes
1985	Sleeping Sake Cup (眠る盃)	Yōko	TV movie
1985	Sanada Taiheiki (真田太平記)	Senhime	TV series
1985	Young Wife (奥様は不良少女!?「おさな妻」)		TV movie
1985	Afternoon Murder (殺人よ、こんにちは)		TV movie
1986	Sailor Suit Love Class Love Lesson A!B!!C!? (セーラー服恋愛教室 愛のレッスンA!B!!C!?)		TV movie
1986	Jump Up! Youth (ジャンプアップ!青春)	Kaori Okada	TV series
1986	Oya ni wa naisho de... (親にはナイショで...)	Kyōko Murayama	TV series
1986	The Story of Pollyanna, Girl of Love (愛少女ポリアンナ物語)	Karen (voice)	TV anime series Also theme songs
1986	Young Wife 2 (奥さまは不良少女!?おさな妻2)		TV movie
1986	Ikkyū-san Katsu! (一休さん・喝!)	Sanae	TV series
1986	Taiyō ni Hoero! (太陽にほえろ!)	Ai Nishitani	Episode 第713話「エスパー少女・愛」
1986	Byakkotai (白虎隊)	Yumiko Inoue	TV miniseries
1987	Hissatsu Kengekinin (必殺剣劇人)	Oshichi	TV series
1988	Gekitotsu! Kyonshi kozo shijo saikyo no kanfu akuma gundan (激突！キョンシー小僧 VS 史上最強のカンフー悪魔軍団)	Yuko	TV movie
1988	Downtown Detectives (ダウンタウン探偵組)		TV series
1988	Mito Komon Season 17 (水戸黄門 第17部)	Chacha-hime	Episode 第22話「惚れた娘はお姫様 -竜野-」
1989	Travelog of Naked Artist (裸の大将放浪記)		Episode 第34話「天からマリアが降ってきたー長崎編」
1990–1991	I Want a Child (子供、ほしいね)	Urara Kubota	TV series
1990	Nekonotopia Nekonomania (ネコノトピアネコノマニア)		TV movie
1990	The Girl with the White Flag (白旗の少女)		TV movie
1991	Tales of the Unusual (世にも奇妙な物語)	Kumiko Higashiyama	Episode「赤い雲」
1992	Shufu-tachi no Zaken'na yo (主婦たちのざけんなヨII)	Rika Miyagawa	TV movie: Segment「子供作ルベカラズ」
1992	College Student Hostess Detective (女子大生ホステス名探偵)		Episode「華やかな密室殺人」
1992	Ōoka Echizen Season 12 (大岡越前 第12部)	Kiku-hime	Episode 第14話「姫様の好物ふかし藷」
1993	Dragon Spirit (琉球の風)	Ugi	TV series
1994	In the Blue Sky (青空にちんどん)	Aki	TV series
1994	I Want to Tell You (君に伝えたい)		Episode 第8回「私の恋は売約済み」
1995	Meibugyō Tōyama no Kinsan Season 7 (名奉行 遠山の金さん 第7シリーズ)	Osen	TV series
1995	Men Who Pretend to Be Asleep (寝たふりしてる男たち)	Yuriko Hoshikawa	TV series
2001	The Chronicle	Mina Shen	Episode "Here There Be Dragons"
2002	Undeclared	Kikuki	Episode "Hal and Hillary"
2002	Psycho Doctor (サイコドクター)	Nami Okino	Episode 第4話「愛されたいだけ...セックス依存症の女」
2006	Masters of Horror	Woman	Episode "Imprint"
2014	Battlefield Tokyo (終戦特集ドラマ 東京が戦場になった日)	Eiko Takagi	TV movie
2016–2017	Yama Onna Nikki (山女日記)	Yuzuhiko Tachibana	TV series
2018	Downtown Rocket (下町ロケット)	Sakiko Tonomura	TV series
2021	Why I Dress Up for Love (着飾る恋には理由があって)	Sumire Mashiba	TV series

== Stage productions ==
- Kiki's Delivery Service (as Kiki, 1993)

== Discography ==
=== Singles ===
- Yasei Jidai (野生時代) (1984) Oricon Singles Chart number 39
- Heroine (ヒロイン) (1985)
- Tokimeki Fall In You (ときめきFALL IN YOU) (1985)
- Cinderella Liberty Mo Hecchara (シンデレラ・リバティもへっちゃら) (1985)
- Shiawase Carnival (し・あ・わ・せカーニバル) (1986)
- Hohoemu Anata Ni Aitai (微笑むあなたに会いたい) (1986) Oricon number 50
- Girlfriend (ガールフレンド) (1986)
- Kimi No Heart Ni Touch (君のハートにタッチ) (1987)
- Chotto Dake Kuzushitai (ちょっとだけくずしたい) (1989)
- Glass No Fune: Mon Mec A Moi (硝子の舟〜mon mec a moi〜) (1989)
- Yume Ga Kanau (夢が叶う) (1990)
- Shōwa (昭和) (1991)
- Sayonara Samba (さよならサンバ) (1993)
- Tabidachi No Uta (旅立ちの唄) (1993)
- Omoide Wa Emerald (想い出はエメラルド) (1994)
- Maybe Tonight (1995)
- Tosan Mitemasuka (父さん見てますか) (2023) Oricon number 46
