= The Wild Sea =

1969 film directed by Tokujirō Yamazaki

- Film poster
- Directed by: Tokujirō Yamazaki
- Screenplay by: Kei Hattori; Tetsuya Naoi
- Starring: Tetsuya Watari; Hideki Takahashi; Masako Izumi; Masakazu Tamura
- Cinematography: Tomoki Kasuga
- Edited by: Mitsuo Kondō
- Music by: Sei Ikeno
- Production company: Shinjyu Sha
- Distributed by: Nikkatsu
- Release date: October 15, 1969 (Japan)
- Running time: 183 minutes
- Country: Japan
- Language: Japanese

The Wild Sea (Japanese: 荒い海, Hepburn: Arai Umi) is a 1969 Japanese seafaring drama film directed by Tokujirō Yamazaki. Planning took five years, while filming took place over a one year and two month period.

== Plot ==
Yōji Kitami is a young man who stands at the crossroads of his life. One day, Yōji meets his childhood friend Katsuyuki Shinoda by chance, and Yōji gets on a whaling boat at the recommendation of Katsuyuki.

== Cast ==
- Sources:
- Tetsuya Watari as Yōji Kitami
- Hideki Takahashi as Katsuyuki Shinoda
- Masako Izumi as Mitsuko
- Masakazu Tamura as Ken Shimamura
- Tōru Yuri as Sugiyama
- Michiko Araki as Kiyo Kitami
- Noriko Honma as Tome Kitami
- Shōbun Inoue as Takei
- Akira Kubo as Kiyohara
- Kō Nishimura as Munakata
- Shoichi Kuwayama as Mankichi Toda
- Masao Shimizu as Sakaki
- Tomoo Nagai as Ogaki
- Sachiko Hidari as Takimura
