= Blood Vendetta =

- Film poster
- Directed by: Takashi Nomura
- Written by: Susumu Shindo
- Starring: Hideki Takahashi; Masako Izumi; Mikio Narita; Tatsuya Fuji; Shigeru Tsuyuguchi; Yoshi Katō; Toru Abe
- Music by: Taichiro Kosugi
- Distributed by: Nikkatsu
- Release date: July 31, 1971 (Japan)
- Running time: 89 minutes
- Country: Japan
- Language: Japanese

Blood Vendetta (Japanese: 逆縁三つ盃, Hepburn: Gyakuen Mitsusakazuki) is a 1971 Japanese yakuza film directed by Takashi Nomura.

== Cast ==
- Hideki Takahashi as Kikukawa Masayoshi
- Masako Izumi as Sawada Kaoru
- Mikio Narita as Mine Eikichi
- Tatsuya Fuji as Nakai Seiji
- Eiji Gō as Sada
- Miyoko Akaza as Oshin
- Hei Enoki as Otsuka
- Shigeru Tsuyuguchi as Ushio Keizō
- Yoshi Katō as Ushio Kōnosuke
- Toru Abe as Tokuzawa Hideo
