= Kaku Takashina =

Japanese actor

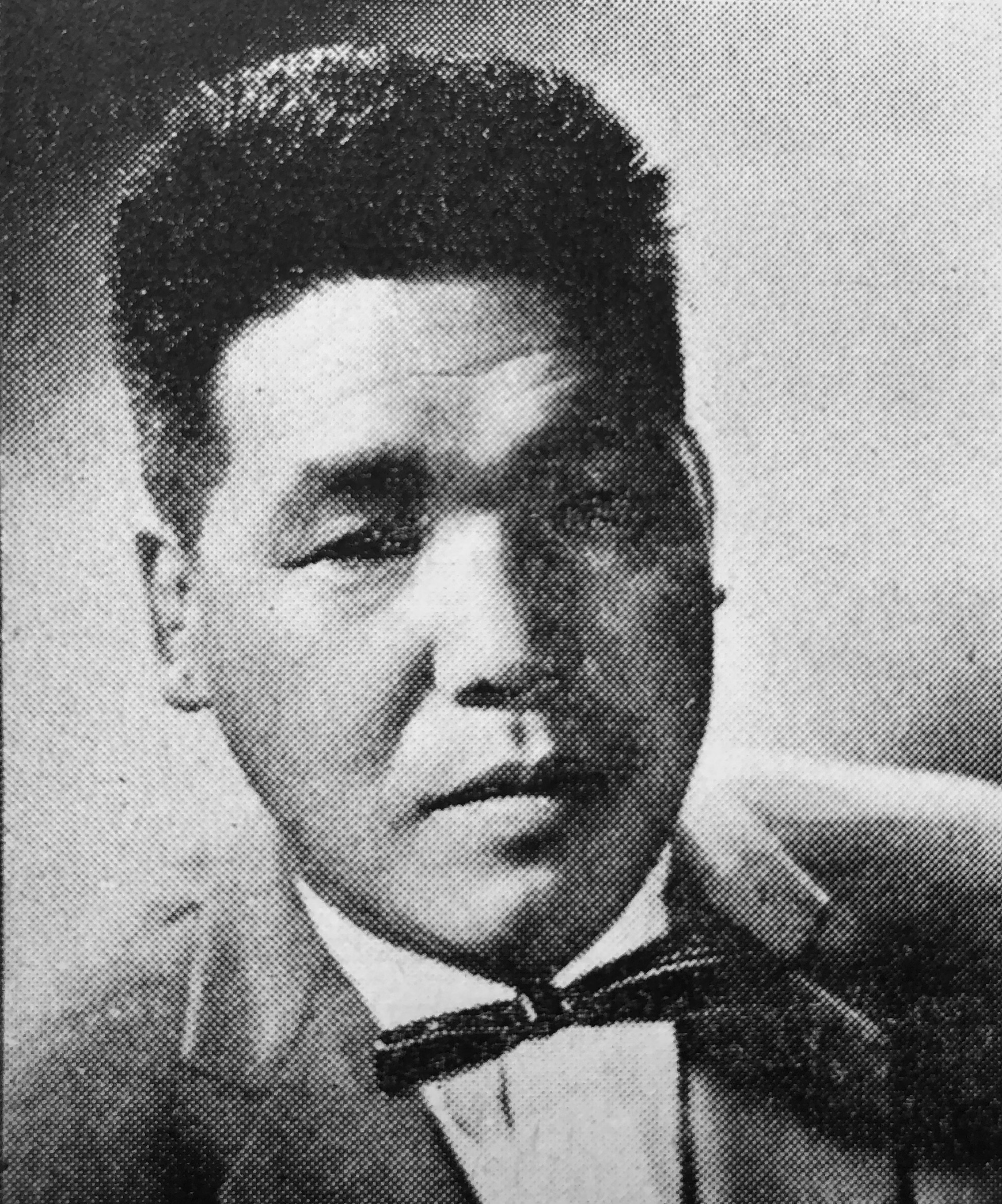
- Kaku Takashina
- Born: February 22, 1919; Kaijō, Chiba, Japan
- Died: March 11, 1994 (aged 75)
- Occupation: Actor
- Years active: 1947–1994

Kaku Takashina (高品格, Takashina Kaku) (February 22, 1919 - March 11, 1994) was a Japanese actor. He won the award for best supporting actor at the 9th Hochi Film Award and at the 6th Yokohama Film Festival for Mahjong hōrōki.

== Selected filmography ==
- Tekken no machi (1947)
- Arabiya monogatari (1951)
- Koi no Oranda-zaka (1951) - Night Guard
- Inazuma (1952) - Bus driver
- Ani imôto (1953)
- Shunkin monogatari (1954) - Genkichi
- Ashita kuru hito (1955) - Hotel's guide
- Haru no yo no dekigoto (1955) - Uomasa
- Mittsu no kao (1955)
- Zoku keisatsu nikki (1955) - Ishikura
- Shiawase wa doko ni (1956)
- Chitei no uta (1956) - Tetsu
- Ukigusa no yado (1957)
- Fukushû wa dare ga yaru (1957) - Hide
- 'Otoko tai otoko' yori: Inochi mo koi mo (1957) - Shigure no Masa
- Kurutta kankei (1957) - Dragon Nishiura
- Frankie Bûchan no zoku aa gunkaki: Nyogo ga-shima funsenki (1957)
- Kunin no shikeishû (1957) - Kishida
- Underworld Beauty (1958) - Ôsawa
- Dose hirotta koi da mono (1958) - Guzu-tetsu
- Fumihazushita haru (1958) - detective A
- Kagenaki koe (1958)
- Kanzenna yûgi (1958) - Man at velodrome
- Hateshinaki yokubô (1958)
- Tokai no dogô (1958)
- Gunshû no naka no taiyô (1959) - Yasukawa
- Dynamite ni hi o tsukero (1959) - Genkichi Narumi
- Zero bângai no ôkami (1959)
- Nikaidô Takuya: Ginza Buraichô - Ginza Mite Guy (1959) - Tatsu
- Jigoku no magarikado (1959) - Sabu
- Fudôtoku kyôiku kôza (1959) - Chief of fire station
- Kenju burai-chō Nukiuchino Ryu (1960, part 1, 2) - Gen
- Datô - Knock Down (1960) - Ishihara
- Jamamono wa kese (1960) - Tôru Yabe
- Tokusôhan 5 gô (1960) - Mimura
- Kenju buraicho: Denko sekka no otoko (1960)
- Mikkô zero rain (1960)
- Umi no joji ni kakero (1960) - Mizuno
- Ôabare fûraibô (1960) - Sakakibara
- Go to Hell, Hoodlums! (1960) - Sanshiro Izeki, clan retainer
- Yato! jigoku e ike (1960)
- Âru koi monogatari (1960)
- Arigataya bushi: ah, arigataya, arigataya (1961)
- Umi no shôbushi (1961) - Shimada
- Tsuiseki (1961)
- Arashi o tsukkiru jetto-ki (1961) - Shirai
- Otoko to otoko no ikiru machi (1962) - Miyajima
- Sugata naki tsuisekisha (1962)
- Ginza no koi no monogatari (1962) - Take-san
- Dai hyôgen (1962) - Gorô Isomura
- Âoi machi no ôkami (1962)
- Hai tiin yakuza (1962) - Detective
- Nikui an-chikushô (1962)
- Zerosen Kurokumo Ikka (1962)
- Hitoribotchi no futari daga (1962) - Satô
- Ore ni kaketa yatsura (1962)
- Alibi (1963) - Takahashi
- Kaze ga yondeiru senbuji - ginza buraicho (1963)
- Ginza no Jirochô - Tenka no ichidaiji (1963) - Ôkuma
- Ôkami no ôji (1963)
- Zokû otoko no monshô (1963)
- Kantô mushuku (1963) - Yakami
- Akai ka to roku denashi (1963)
- Kakedashi keiji (1964) - Muneta
- Hana to dotô (1964)
- Teigin jiken: Shikeishû (1964)
- Our Blood Will Not Forgive (1964) - Hôsaku Katagai
- Otoko no monshô - kanka jô (1964)
- Tekkaba yaburi (1964)
- Shî ni zama o mirû (1964)
- Otoko no monsho: hana to nagadosu (1964)
- Kenjû yarô (1965)
- Story of a Prostitute (1965) - Makita
- Seishun to wa nanda (1965) - Uegen
- Toba no mesu neko (1965)
- Dainippon koroshiya den (1965) - Kumoi
- Kaitô X - Kubi no nai otoko (1965)
- Tattooed Life (1965) - Tsuneyoshi
- Sanbiki no nora înu (1965)
- Otoko no monshô ore wa kiru (1965)
- Înochi shirazû no roku dênashî (1965)
- Gyangû no shôzo (1965)
- Ore ni sawaru to abunaize (1966) - Detective Toyama
- Toba no mesu neko: sutemi no shôbu (1966)
- Chimatsuri kenkajo (1966)
- Shin yûkyôden (1966)
- Ya zhou mi mi jing tan (1966)
- Horo no uta (1966)
- Kitaguni no ryojô (1967) - Station master
- Hôshiyo nâgekûna: Shorî no otokô (1967)
- Yogiri yo Kon'yamo Arigatō (1967) - Senkichi
- Shichinin no yajû (1967)
- Minagoroshi no kenjû (1967)
- Shichinin no yajû: chi no sengen (1967)
- Ketto (1967) - Tayan, smith
- Wakaoyabun tanjô (1967) - Yakichi
- Shin otokono monshô: waka ôyabun tanjô (1967)
- Bakudan otoko to iwareru âitsu (1967)
- Burai yori daikanbu (1968) - Kyûzô Shimamoto
- Burai hijô (1968) - Hashizume
- Shikiyoku no hate (1968) - Takagi, a detective
- Retaliation (1968) - Isobe
- Burai: Kuro dosu (1968) - Igawa
- Zankyo mujo (1968) - Roku
- Hoshikage no hatoba (1968)
- Zoku onna no keisatsu (1969)
- Yakuza wataridori: Akutôkagyô (1969)
- Onna banchô - jîngi yaburi (1969)
- Bakuto mujô (1969)
- Nagurikomi Shimizu Minato (1970)
- The Vampire Doll (1970) - Nonomura's Employee Genzô
- Sympathy for the Underdog (1971)
- Lake of Dracula (1971) - Kyûsaku
- Hyakuman-nin no dai-gasshô (1972) - Inspector Kurosumi
- Daitokai Series (1976-1979, TV drama) - Yonezo maruyama
- Mahjong hōrōki (1984) - Deme Toku
- Aitsu ni Koishite (1987) - Kinzō Matsumae
- Saraba itoshiki hito yo (1987) - Minoru Nitta
- Machibugyo Nikki (1987)
- Dokuganryū Masamune (1987 Taiga drama)
- Hana no Furu Gogo (1989)
- Kagerô (1991) - Takeshu
- Kojika monogatari (1991) - Yoshio Sakaguchi
- Chi ko monogatari nezumi kozo no tsukuri kata seikimatsu-ban (1991)
- Kowagaru hitobito (1994) - Master of liquor maker (final film role)
