= Makoto Wada =

Japanese film director (1936–2019)

Makoto Wada 和田誠
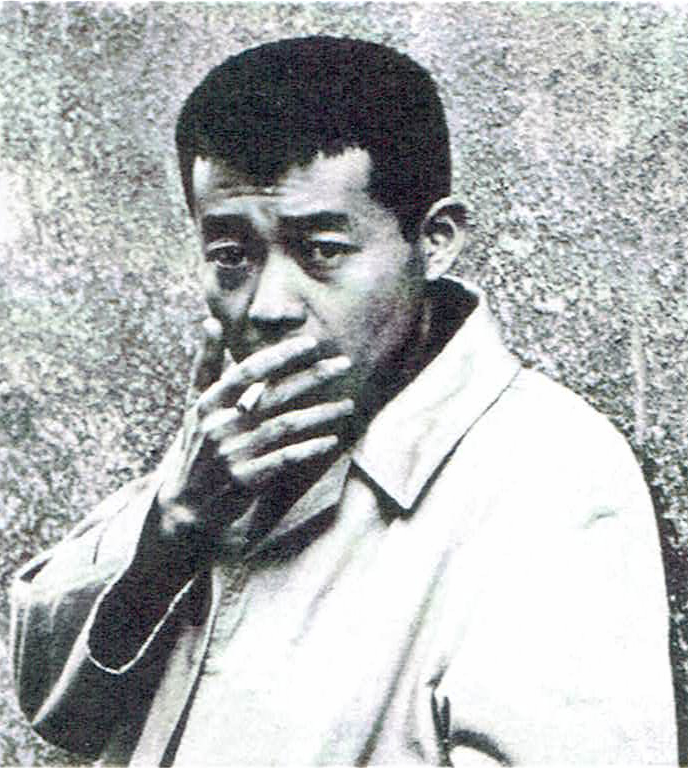
- Makoto Wada in 1966.
- Born: 10 April 1936; Osaka, Japan
- Died: 7 October 2019 (aged 83); Tokyo, Japan
- Occupations: Graphic designer; illustrator; essayist; film director
- Spouse: Remi Hirano (m. 1972)

Makoto Wada (和田誠, Wada Makoto) (10 April 1936 – 7 October 2019) was a Japanese illustrator, essayist, and film director.

== Biography ==
Wada was born in Osaka on 10 April 1936. He attended Tama Art University, where he won the Japan Advertising Art Award in 1957. As an illustrator, Wada drew many cartoons and caricatures for Shinichi Hoshi and Haruki Murakami. He designed more than 2,000 covers for the magazine Shūkan Bunshun from 1972 to 2017 and provided illustrations for the book review section of the Mainichi Shimbun from 1992 to 2018.

Being a passionate film fan, he started his career as a film director in 1984. He won the award for best director at the 31st Blue Ribbon Awards for Kaitō Ruby.

Since 1972, Wada was married to Remi Hirano, the granddaughter of Henry Pike Bowie. They had two sons: Sho and Ritsu. Their eldest son Sho is the guitarist and vocalist of Triceratops and is married to actress Juri Ueno.

Wada died on 7 October 2019 at the hospital in Tokyo. He was 83 years old. The cause of death was pneumonia.

== Filmography ==
- Murder (1963, animated short film)
- Mahjong hōrōki (1984)
- Kaitō Ruby (1988)
- Kowagaru Hitobito (1994)
- Shizukana Ayashii Gogo no (1997, anthology film)
- Mayonaka made (1999)
- Shōmei kumagai gakkō (2004, documentary)
