= Ambition Without Honor =

- Directed by: Takashi Miike
- Written by: Muneo Kishi
- Produced by: Harumi Sone
- Cinematography: Muneyuki Tsuda
- Music by: Toshiaki Tsushima
- Release date: April 12, 1996
- Running time: 95 minutes
- Language: Japanese

Ambition Without Honor (Japanese: 仁義なき野望, Hepburn: Jingi naki yabō) is a 1996 Japanese direct-to-video yakuza film directed by Takashi Miike. The film's title has also been translated as Ruthless Ambition and Heartless Ambition. It was followed by Ambition Without Honor 2 in 1997.

== Plot ==
The film follows Tetsuya, an aspiring young yakuza. At age 17 he kills the head of a rival family in order to become a made yakuza in his own family. He spends seven years in jail but when he is released, he finds that the two formerly rival families have now reconciled. In order to make peace, Tetsuya's family is forced to banish him. They break their promise to make him a full yakuza and his back tattoo is left unfinished. Left without a family, Tetsuya sets out on a one-man path of destruction.

== Cast ==
Actor	Role
Naoko Amihama	Kayo
Saburō Kitajima	Ishibashi
Shinichirō Mikami	
Isamu Nagato	
Yoshiyuki Omori (as Yoshiyuki Oomori)	
Kōjiro Shimizu	
Harumi Sone	Leader of Tamazawa clan
Yūta Sone (as Hideki Sone)	Tetsuya
Nobuo Yana	

== Reception ==
The French website darksidereviews.com called the film a "sympathetic homage to Fukasaku" and gave it 5.5 stars out of 10.

Reviewer Marina D. Richter of asianmoviepulse.com wrote that it "feels like a rehearsal for the later yakuza-themed Takashi's films like 'Deadly Outlaw: Rekka' or 'Graveyard of Honor' (both from 2002)".

The website onderhond.com called it "dubious filler" and rated it 2 out of 5.

The website Cinema Dailies analyzed the scores of the film on Rotten Tomatoes, IMDb, and Letterboxd and found that Ambition Without Honor is ranked Takashi Miike's 64th best film.

== Critical analysis ==
In his book Agitator: The Cinema of Takashi Miike, author Tom Mes writes that the film's "title was an explicit reference to the successful yakuza series Battles Without Honor and Humanity directed by Kinji Fukasaku in the first half of the 1970s and also produced by Toei. The film itself however bore little relation to Fukasaku's films, the only connections being composer Toshiaki Tsushima (whose score does resemble his famous soundtrack for the Battles series) and actors Shinichiro Mikami, Nobuo Yana and Harumi Sone. Sane, who had played the role of Soma in Miike's Daisan No Gokudō films, served as producer on Jingi Naki Yabō. The film was an attempt to launch his son Hideki as a leading man in V-cinema, an intention reflected in the story, which deals with a father-son relation ship and the gap between generations." Ultimately, Mes finds that "at the heart of Jingi Naki Yabō's narrative lies the generation gap. The story is Tetsuya's search for a father figure." Mes continues, writing, "Although its main character is another typical Miike outcast, this weakness and the film’s unremarkable handling on a stylistic level make Jingi Naki Yabō at best an average entry in the director's filmography. Something emphasised by the success of Miike's next exploration of the clash between young and old."

== Sequel ==
A sequel, Ambition Without Honor 2, also directed by Takashi Miike, was released in 1997.
