= The Crazy Family (1984 film) =

1984 Japanese film

- Film poster
- Directed by: Gakuryū Ishii
- Written by: Yoshinori Kobayashi; Fumio Kōnami; Gakuryū Ishii
- Story by: Yoshinori Kobayashi
- Produced by: Kazuhiko Hasegawa; Toyoji Yamane; Shirō Sasaki
- Starring: Mitsuko Baisho; Youki Kudoh; Hitoshi Ueki
- Cinematography: Masaki Tamura
- Edited by: Junichi Kikuchi
- Music by: 1984
- Production company: Director's Company
- Distributed by: Art Theatre Guild
- Release date: 23 June 1984 (Japan)
- Running time: 106 minutes
- Country: Japan
- Language: Japanese

The Crazy Family (Japanese: 逆噴射家族, Hepburn: Gyaku-funsha Kazoku) is a 1984 Japanese film directed by Sōgo Ishii. Its special effects were supervised by Takashi Ito. The movie is a satirical take on the pressures of Japanese society, particularly focusing on the idea of the "perfect family."

== Plot ==
The story revolves around the Kobayashi family, who seem to have achieved the dream of the typical middle-class Japanese family. They move into a new suburban home, filled with hopes of living an idyllic life. However, the pressures of maintaining this image soon begin to unravel the family's sanity. The father, Katsuhiko, is obsessed with protecting the family from any perceived threats, both real and imagined. This paranoia grows as he feels increasingly unable to control the pressures of work and the expectations of society. The mother, Saeko, attempts to maintain a sense of normalcy but becomes increasingly detached as the situation worsens. Their son, Masaki, is a high school student who struggles with the intense academic pressure to succeed, while their daughter, Erika, is a rebellious teenager who resents the constraints placed on her by her parents.

As the family's mental state deteriorates, the movie descends into chaos. The once perfect image of the Kobayashi family crumbles, and they become increasingly violent and irrational. The father's paranoia reaches a breaking point, leading to a bizarre and destructive climax as the family turns on each other in a desperate attempt to maintain their sanity.

== Awards and nominations ==
6th Yokohama Film Festival

- Won: Best Newcomer - Youki Kudoh
- 8th Best Film

== See also ==
- List of Japanese films of 1984
