= Ambition Without Honor 2 =

- Directed by: Takashi Miike
- Written by: Muneo Kishi
- Produced by: Harumi Sone
- Cinematography: Keijiro Miyanishi
- Music by: Toshiaki Tsushima
- Release date: June 13, 1997
- Running time: 98 minutes
- Country: Japan
- Language: Japanese

Ambition Without Honor 2 (仁義なき野望2, Jingi naki yabō 2) is a 1997 Japanese direct-to-video yakuza film directed by Takashi Miike. It is the sequel to Ambition Without Honor (1996).

== Plot ==
Tetsuya, a young yakuza, returns to his family in Shizuoka after his adoptive father is wounded in an attack from a rival gang. Amid his battle against dishonorable enemies and corrupt yakuza politics, he makes an unlikely ally in a rebel cop named Kitahara.

== Cast ==
Actor	Role
Hirotarō Honda	
Hiroko Sakuramachi	
Takashi Shikauchi	
Kōjiro Shimizu	Kitahara
Harumi Sone	Iwasaki
Yūta Sone (as Hideki Sone)	Tetsuya
Gō Wakabayashi	
Shingo Yamashiro	

== Sequel ==
A sequel, 仁義なき野望3狼 (Ambition Without Honor 3: Wolf), was released in Japan on April 10, 1998. It was directed by Masatake Matsuo and is 91 minutes long.
