= Takano Chōei =

Coordinates: 39°8′30″N 141°08′28″E

Takano Chōei 高野 長英
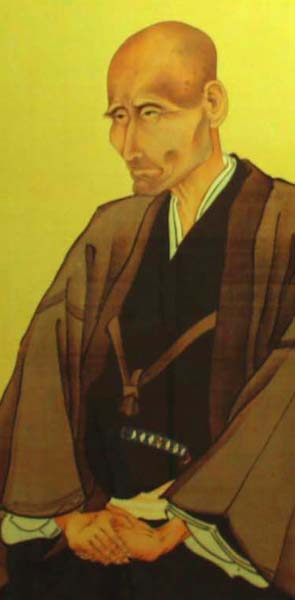
- Takano Chōei
- Born: Gotō Kyōsai, June 12, 1804; Mizusawa Domain, Japan
- Died: December 3, 1850 (aged 46); Edo, Japan

Takano Chōei (高野 長英; June 12, 1804 – December 3, 1850) was a prominent scholar of Rangaku (western science) during the Bakumatsu period in Japan.

== Life ==
Chōei was born as Gotō Kyōsai, the third son of Gotō Sōsuke, a middle-ranking samurai in Mizusawa Domain of Mutsu Province in what is now part of Iwate Prefecture. At an early age, however, he was adopted by his uncle Takano Gensai who had studied medicine under Sugita Genpaku and influenced Chōei to follow in the same profession. He first studied medicine in Edo in 1820 after winning money in a lottery that he used to pay his way. There he first studied under Sugita Hakugen, then Yoshida Chōshuku, who gave him the name Chōei. After the death of his teacher in 1824 he took over some of the teaching duties in the school.

A year later he left for Nagasaki to study under Philipp Franz von Siebold. There he paid for his education by writing papers about Japanese life and culture for von Siebold, gathering plants and translating books from Dutch to Japanese. One of his fellow students was Watanabe Kazan. After the school was shut down and von Siebold expelled from Japan in 1828, Chōei was forced to flee. He finally settled in Edo in 1830 where he wrote his Fundamentals of Western Medicine. There he was reunited with Watanabe Kazan, and both attended meetings of Shōshikai, a study group of intellectuals interested in foreign affairs.

In 1838 Chōei married and then published Yumemonogatari (The Tale of a Dream), a book critical of the Tokugawa shogunate's handling of the 1837 Morrison Incident. Since he was of samurai status, he was dealt with harshly by the authorities and sent to the Kodenmachō prison where he spent five years of his life sentence in the commoners' section. While in prison, he wrote a treatise on Western learning in Japan called Bansha Sōyaku Shōki ("A Short Record of a Meeting with Misfortune"). The book examines the history of Western knowledge entering Japan from the Sengoku Period to the 1830s. In 1844, he arranged to have a fire started in the prison and made his escape. He then spent the rest of his life in hiding using various aliases. At one point he is said to have poured acid on his face to disguise his appearance and elude arrest.

He returned to Edo in March 1850 and lived in hiding in Aoyama Hyakunin-cho (present-day Minami Aoyama). The area had a concentration of official residences of the Shōgun's foot soldiers and Chōei ran a medical practice under a false name. However, on the last day of October in the same year, an informant told police official where he was hiding, and the Edo Machi-bugyō sent a number of men to arrest him. The actual course of events is uncertain, but Chōei was severely beaten with jitte as he resisted arrest and was killed. Official reports stated that he drew a dagger and stabbed himself in the neck during the melee.

A stone monument, inscribed with "The hiding place of Doctor Chōei Takano", commemorates the location, and his grave at the temple of Zenko-ji in Kita-Aoyama has an inscription by Katsu Kaishū.

== Takano Choei former residence ==
The house where Chōei lived until he left for Edo at the age of 17 in Ōshū, Iwate has been preserved as a memorial museum. This Edo period samurai residence was designated a National Historic Site. on April 13, 1933. The house was extensively restored in 1876, but retains two rooms facing the front courtyard on the west side in the original condition in which they were used by Chōei. However, as the house is in private hands, the rooms are not normally open to the public.

== Works ==
- Fundamentals of Medicine, vol.1 in five books (1832)
- Treatise on Two Things for the Relief of Famine (1836)
- Treatise on Contagious Diseases, including Methods of Avoiding Epidemic Diseases, in two volumes (1836)
- The Tale of a Dream (1838)
