= Triceratops (band) =

Japanese rock band

- Also known as: Tricera
- Origin: Tokyo, Japan
- Genres: Alternative rock
- Years active: 1996–2025
- Labels: Epic/Sony Records (1997–2001); Victor Entertainment (2002–2007); Tearbridge Production (2008–present)
- Members: Shō Wada; Kōji Hayashi; Yoshifumi Yoshida
- Website: Official website

Triceratops (トライセラトップス, Toraiseratoppusu), also shortened to Tricera, is a Japanese rock band formed in 1996. Their work has been compared to Do As Infinity.

Primarily influenced by British Invasion bands such as The Beatles and The Rolling Stones, Irish rockers U2, Radiohead and American acts such as Michael Jackson, the band's songs feature strong melodic lines, harmonies and are often backed by straight blues-influenced rock and roll. Their name comes from the number of members being equivalent to the number of horns on a triceratops.

== Band members ==
- Shō Wada (和田 唱 Wada Shō) - guitar, vocals
- Kōji Hayashi (林 幸治 Hayashi Kōji) - bass, vocals
- Yoshifumi Yoshida (吉田 佳史 Yoshida Yoshifumi) - drums, vocals

== Discography ==
=== Indies albums ===
1. Triceratops (May 25, 1997)

==== Studio albums ====
1. Triceratops (March 21, 1998)
2. The Great Skeleton's Music Guide Book (December 2, 1998)
3. A Film About the Blues(November 10, 1999)
4. King of the Jungle(February 21, 2001)
5. Dawn World (October 9, 2002)
6. Licks & Rocks (February 18, 2004)
7. The 7th Voyage of Triceratops (March 2, 2005)
8. Level 32 (November 1, 2006)
9. Made In Love (October 8, 2008)
10. We Are One (September 8, 2010)
11. Homeworks (2013)
12. Miyatora (2013)
13. Songs for the Starlight (December 10, 2014)

==== Mini albums ====
1. We Are One -Certificate-

==== Compilation albums ====
1. Triceratops Greatest 1997-2001 (January 2, 2003)
2. Don't Stop the Noise! The Best Singles & B-Sides 1997-2007 (July 25, 2007)
3. Dinosoul (July 18, 2012)

==== Live albums ====
1. Shake Your Hip!! (February 20, 2008)
2. Love is Live (December 21, 2011)

=== Singles ===
1. Raspberry (July 21, 1997)
2. Kanojo no Shinion (彼女のシニヨン) (October 22, 1997)
3. Rocket ni Notte (ロケットに乗って Get on the Rocket) (January 21, 1998)
4. Mascara & Mascaras (マスカラ&マスカラス Masukara ando Masukarasu) (July 15, 1998)
5. Gothic Ring (ゴシックリング Goshikku Ringu) (October 7, 1998)
6. Fever (November 21, 1998)
7. Guatemala (February 24, 1999)
8. Going to the Moon (GOING TO THE MOON) (May 19, 1999)
9. if (September 8, 1999)
10. Second Coming (SECOND COMING) (October 20, 1999)
11. Universe (UNIVERSE) (December 8, 1999)
12. Groove Walk (GROOVE WALK) (June 21, 2000)
13. Fall Again (October 25, 2000)
14. Believe the Light (with Lisa) (2001)
15. 2020 (May 1, 2002)
16. Fly Away (July 31, 2002)
17. Tattoo (TATTOO) (November 19, 2003)
18. Rock Music (ROCK MUSIC) (January 28, 2004)
19. Jewel (October 20, 2004)
20. The Captain (THE CAPTAIN January 26, 2005)
21. Transformer (トランスフォーマー Toransufōmaa) (March 22, 2006)
22. 33 (June 21, 2006)
23. Bokura no Ippo (僕らの一歩 Our Step) (September 21, 2006)
24. Let's Dive! (November 21, 2007)
25. Dream in a Cylinder (November 21, 2007)
26. Future Folder (July 2, 2008)
27. Loony's Anthem (September 3, 2008)
28. I Go Wild (October 7, 2009)
29. 爆音Time ～No Music, No Life.～ (December 16, 2009)
30. Shout! (2015)
31. GLITTER / MIRACLE (May 9, 2018)
32. MATRIX GIRL (マトリクスガール) (July 7, 2021)

==== Album appearances ====
1. Unicorn Tribute

=== DVDs ===
==== Live ====
1. Live! "A Film about the Blues" Tour (June 21, 2000)
2. Triceratops Greatest 1997-2001 Live History (January 2, 2003)
3. Live Warp!!! (January 25, 2006)
4. Going to the Moon -15th Anniversary Show at Hibaya Music Bowl- (December 12, 2012)
5. 12 Bar "13" (February 19, 2014)

==== Music video compilations ====
1. Mascara & Mascaras ~Triceratops Short Films~ (マスカラ&マスカラス～TRICERATOPS SHORT FILMS～) (February 21, 2001)
2. Triceratops Short Films II (February 21, 2001)
3. Triceratops Short Films III (February 21, 2001)
4. Short Films IV (November 1, 2006)
