= Kyosuke Machida =

Japanese actor (born 1936)

- Born: 22 June 1936 (age 89); Chiba, Japan
- Occupation: Actor
- Years active: 1936–2001

Kyosuke Machida (待田 京介, Machida Kyosuke; born 22 June 1936) is a retired Japanese actor. He appeared in more than 150 films, including many yakuza films produced by Toei. When he was a child, he became Mas Oyama's pupil. He is currently an advisor to the International Karate Organization Kyokushin-kaikan.

== Filmography ==
=== Film ===
- Kurenai no Tsubasa (1958)
- Kunoichi ninpō (1964)
- Abashiri Prison (1965)
- Zoku Soshiki Bōryoku (1967)
- Zatoichi and the Fugitives (1968) as Ogano Genpachiro
- Outlaw: Gangster VIP (1968) as Sugiyama Katsuhiko
- The Valiant Red Peony (1969)
- Bloodstained Clan Honor (1970)
- Soshiki Bōryoku Kyōdaisakazuki (1971)
- Street Mobster (1972)
- The Yakuza (1975) as Kato Jiro
- Wolf Guy: Burning Wolf Man (1975)
- The Resurrection of the Golden Wolf (1979)
- The Go Masters (1983)
- Saigo no Bakuto (1985)

=== Television ===
- Edo no KazePart2 (1976) (ep. 11, guest)
- Edo no Uzu (1978) (ep. 9, guest)
- Daitsuiseki (1978) (ep. 14, guest)
- Seibu Keisatsu (1979) (ep. 5 & 12, guest)
- Shishi no Jidai (1981) (Taiga drama) as Detective Ueda
- Sanada Taiheiki (1985–86) as Ban Naganobu
