= Abunai Deka =

- Genre: Police procedural Action drama Comedy drama
- Directed by: Tōru Murakawa; Takahito Hara; Yasuharu Hasebe; Haruo Ichikura; Yusuke Narita; Kiyoshi Nishimura; Hiroyoshi Tezeni
- Starring: Hiroshi Tachi; Kyōhei Shibata; Atsuko Asano; Tōru Nakamura; Shizuo Chujō; Michihiro Yamanishi; Haruo "Bengal" Yanagihara; Takeshi Akiyama; Kenji Kinugasa; Kanae Hasebe; Nana Kinomi
- Opening theme: Hiroshi Tachi "She's So Good"
- Ending theme: Hiroshi Tachi "Tsumetai Taiyō" (lit. 'Cold Sun')
- Country of origin: Japan
- No. of seasons: 1
- No. of episodes: 51

Production
- Producers: Hirokichi Okada; Norio Hatsukawa
- Running time: 54 minutes

Original release
- Network: Nippon Television
- Release: October 5, 1986 – September 27, 1987

Abunai Deka (あぶない刑事; lit. 'Dangerous Detective'), often shortened to Abudeka (あぶデカ), is a Japanese television drama aired by Nippon Television between 1986 and 1987. It stars Hiroshi Tachi as Toshiki "Taka" Takayama and Kyōhei Shibata as Yūji "Yūji" Ōshita, two detectives of Minato Police Station, a fictional police station located in Naka-ku, Yokohama, Kanagawa Prefecture.

This "buddy cop" series depicts the unconventional, aggressive investigative methods of two detectives; while its production concept was explicitly billed as a Japanese take on Starsky & Hutch or a live-action Dirty Pair, the show's content also drew comparisons to Miami Vice, which began airing in Japan the same year.

Regarding its tone, the show initially followed the hard-boiled style typical of conventional police dramas. However, as the episodes progressed, it incorporated witty banter, rapid-fire exchanges, and ad-libbed dialogue, ultimately establishing a comedic style that largely abandoned the somber, tragic atmosphere usually associated with the genre.

This thoroughly "trendy drama" appeal resonated with viewers; the first TV season—originally slated for a six-month run—was extended by another two-quarter block. The series became a social phenomenon, primarily appealing to younger audiences—a demographic different from that of previous police dramas—and has continued intermittently for over 40 years, with theatrical film adaptations and novels and musical theatre by the Takarazuka Revue.

== Cast ==
=== Main characters ===
- Hiroshi Tachi as Toshiki "Taka" Takayama: A detective in the Investigation Division (later a private investigator after retirement). He sometimes refers to himself as "Dandy Takayama". He's a professional in organized crime investigations and is relentlessly pursuing the "Ginsei-kai", a large-scale Yakuza group based in Yokohama. Usually has a cool demeanor, but at times he shows a passionate side driven by a strong sense of justice. Well-versed in firearms, always carrying two handguns, and is also proficient with shotguns and rifles. Although he cannot drive a car, he is highly skilled at operating motorcycles and heavy machinery. After retiring, he moved to New Zealand and ran a detective agency with Ōshita. In Home Coming, he returns to Yokohama with Ōshita after his detective license in New Zealand is revoked due to trouble with local police officers, and they open the T&Y Detective Agency.
- Kyōhei Shibata as Yūji "Yūji" Ōshita: A detective in the Investigation Division (later a private investigator after retirement). He sometimes refers to himself as "Sexy Ōshita". He is skilled at investigating theft cases and disguising himself, and also possesses exceptional athletic ability and driving skills. Prefers to act decisively and quickly, but this comes at the expense of patience and perseverance. On the other hand, he shows a rational side when necessary, acting as a check on Takayama. Like Takayama, he is well-versed in firearms and prefers to use small revolvers. He is a car enthusiast and prefers using luxury cars (such as the Nissan Leopard) for investigations. After retiring, he moved to New Zealand with Takayama. In Home Coming, he returns to Yokohama with Takayama and they open the T&Y Detective Agency.
- Atsuko Asano as Kaoru Mayama: A female detective in the Juvenile Division and a close friend of Takayama and Ōshita. Specialist in juvenile cases, but as the series progresses, she takes on a comedic relief role and appears in various cosplay outfits. She was friends with Matsumura even before becoming a police officer, and in Madamada, succeeds her as Chief of the Juvenile Division (Chief Inspector). In Final 5 Days, she serves as the director of the prefectural police's important artifact storage facility, she later resigned on the same day as Takayama and Ōshita due to her marriage, but the marriage turned out to be a scam, and she was swindled out of her retirement allowance. In Home Coming, she returns to Yokohama, where she happens to run into Takayama, Ōshita, and Machida again.
- Tōru Nakamura as Tōru Machida: A rookie detective who has just been transferred from the Traffic Division to the Investigation Division. He's a womanizer and busy trying to pick up women even while on duty. No matter how many times he gets into trouble, he's always taken advantage of by Takayama and Ōshita's promise to "introduce a woman" and ends up procuring info or guns for them. However, he seems to have the makings of a detective, and he was promoted in the 1990s, eventually rising to the position of Chief of the Investigation Division (Chief Inspector) in Madamada. Since becoming Chief Inspector, he has adopted phrases that Kondō used to say and, as a superior, has been strict with Takayama and Ōshita, but when the three of them are alone, he reverts to his former subservient attitude and cooperating with them.
- Shizuo Chujō as Takuzō Kondō : A Chief of the Investigation Division (Chief Inspector). A veteran detective with 30 years of experience. He has trouble dealing with the problematic Takayama and Ōshita, and if they continue to disobey orders, he throws a tantrum and abandons his work. However, deep down, he has great trust in the two, and ultimately, he will tacitly approve of or secretly support their actions, even at the risk of resigning. As the chief of the Investigative Division, he is susceptible to orders from the prefectural police, but he possesses a very strong sense of justice, and this personality has earned him great trust from those around him. He reached retirement age in 1990. Until Fukamachi's appointment in 1996, there was no official chief of the Investigation Division, but Kondō's presence has been mentioned even after Returns.
- Michihiro Yamanishi as Kōichi "Papa" Yoshii: A Inspector. He is Takayama and Ōshita's senior detective. Due to his honest character and the fact that he is married with children, he is affectionately called "Papa" within the Investigation Division. Unlike Takayama and Ōshita, he is a very orthodox detective. During investigations, he handles on-site command and acts as the liaison with the Division Chief, though he is often troubled by the immoral behavior of Takayama, Ōshita, and especially Tanaka, with whom he mainly works as a partner. He reached retirement age shortly after Madamada, he runs an Oden restaurant with his wife, while also provides job placement support for young people who have been released on parole.
- Haruo "Bengal" Yanagihara as Fumio "Naka-san" Tanaka: Another senior detective to Takayama and Ōshita. He excels at coercing suspects into confessions by repeatedly urging them to "spit out" during interrogations. On the other hand, he's an opportunist who tries to please others and is prone to harassing attractive women. Initially portrayed as a gloomy and cynical character, he gradually became a comedic relief character as his comical ad-libs with other detectives. He reached retirement age shortly after Madamada, he runs Ramen yatai owner and informant, cooperating with Takayama and Ōshita.
- Takeshi Akiyama as Haruhiko "Haru-san" Yoshida: A colleague of Takayama and Ōshita. Within the Investigation Division, he is the second most honest and orthodox detective after Yoshii, and assisted Takayama and Ōshita in their investigations along with Tanimura. He holds a boat license and skilled at operating both cars and boats. The actor was suffering from rectal cancer and left the show after his appearance in Forever TV Special '98, passing away shortly thereafter.
- Kenji Kinugasa as Susumu Tanimura: A young detective who works alongside Yoshida. Towards the end of the first TV series, his "muscle-bound idiot" character, who goes shirtless inside the Minato Police Station and when confronting criminals, became a defining trait. After Yoshida left the Minato Police Station, he served as a subordinate of Yoshii and Tanaka. In Final 5 Days, he is transferred to the Yokohama Harbor Police Station.
- Kanae Hasebe as Hitomi "Hitomi-chan" Yamaji: A female police officer working in the General Affairs Department of the Minato Police Station, and it's become a tradition for her to serve tea whenever a detective from the Investigation Division says, "Hitomi-chan, give me some tea!". She took over the Traffic Division's radio dispatch duties from Kōno—serving in that role from Returns through Madamada—and has served as secretary to Chief Machida since Final 5 Days.

=== Recurring characters ===
- Nana Kinomi as Yūko Matsumura: A Chief of the Juvenile Division, female police Chief Inspector who is also a friend of Takayama, Ōshita, and Kaoru. Has a lavish appearance reminiscent of a hostess at a high-class club, however, her friendly and big-sister personality makes her well-liked, and she wields influence over biker gangs. She also prefers flashy red vehicles, owning a Nissan Fairlady Z and a Ford Mustang Convertible. In Madamada, she is promoted to police chief of the Minato Police Station (Assistant Commissioner). In Final 5 Days, she retires from the police and becomes the president of an NPO that monitors imported goods. Although there are limitations due to her position, she support Takayama and Ōshita when they are in trouble. Due to the actress's schedule, she only appears in the first few episodes of both TV series.
- Hiroshi Miki as Hideo Suzue: A detective in the Juvenile Division. He frequently finds himself dragged into the reckless actions of Takayama, Ōshita, and Kaoru. Due to a retirement of actor, he left the show after Mottomo.
- Husako Kenmotsu as Yoshimi Kōno: A female radio operator at the Minato Police Station. She left the show after Mottomo.
- Takahito Horiuchi as Ryu Takeda: A police officer. He was Machida's classmate at the police academy. He often acted as Takayama's driver when Ōshita was absent, but due to a retirement of actor, he left the show after Matamata.
- Yōzaburō Itō as Tetsuo Izawa: A police officer. In Motto, he takes on more screen time, replacing the absent Ryu Takeda. Although the character disappears after Mottomo, the actor Itō appears as Detective Takeshi Kishimoto of the Juvenile Division in Returns through Final 5 Days.
- Issei Kai as Keizō Takeda: A police officer. In Madamada, he is transferred to the Juvenile Division and becomes a detective. In Final 5 Days, he is transferred to the Vehicle Division, and Takayama and Ōshita forcibly take unmarked car away.
- Yudai Ishiyama as Ichirō "Yas-san" Yasuda: A forensic investigator. He reached retirement age in Madamada.
- Daisuke Iijima as Shirō Aikawa: A detective in the Juvenile Division. In Madamada, he has already reached retirement age and is working as a security guard at a police building.
- Koshiro Kagawa as Tōru Dobashi: A Chief of Traffic Division (Chief Inspector). In Madamada, he has already reached retirement age and is working as a security guard at an amusement park.
- Kōji Shimizu as Satoru Shibano: A detective from the prefectural police headquarters who was dispatched to the Minato Police's jurisdiction whenever a major incident occurred. He tries to take the lead in the investigation, but is always outmaneuvered by Takayama and Ōshita. He appears a total of five times between episodes 1 and 22 of the first TV series.
- Nenji Kobayashi as Shinzō Fukamachi: A second official chief of the Investigation Division (Chief Inspector). In 1996, he was transferred from the prefectural police headquarters to the Minato Police Station as Kondō's successor. While he usually presents himself as an inflexible, rigid man with a strong sense of elitism, his sense of justice is just as strong as Kondō's. When faced with despicable crimes or unreasonable orders, he becomes uncontrollably angry and acts even more recklessly than Takayama and Ōshita. In Madamada, he relinquishes the position of chief of the Investigation Division to Machida and is promoted to prefectural police chief (Senior Commissioner). He appears Returns through Final 5 Days.

== Notable features ==
=== Music ===
One of the features of this series is its opening and ending themes composed by Hiroshi Tachi, insert songs performed by Kyōhei Shibata, and original tracks written specifically for the show by various Japanese artists. From the planning stage, the production aimed for a Western-style musical aesthetic inspired by Miami Vice; by featuring exclusively English lyrics for the opening and original songs, the series pursued a stylish aesthetic that was rare for Japanese police dramas of that era. Tachi and Shibata have continued to provide songs for subsequent installment as well.

Three insert songs performed by Shibata were used in the first TV series: "Running Shot" (Episodes 10 and 12–24), "WAR" (Episodes 25–40), and "FUGITIVE" (Episodes 41–51). Each was featured during scenes highlighting the Ōshita. Among them, "Running Shot" has continued to be used in subsequent installment—excluding the Matamata and Motto.

Since Returns, the series has shifted towards emphasizing original music unique to each installment (especially instrumental tracks), and English songs are rarely used anymore. On the other hand, In Forever TV Special '98, Final 5 Days and Home Coming, remixes of original tracks from their early installment (up to Motto) are used as an homage.

=== Guns ===
One of the features of this series was its relatively detailed depiction of firearms. This was unusual for Japanese television dramas in 1986. Hundled by "BIGSHOT"—a company specializing in firearm special effects established just before the first TV series—realistic prop guns based on modelguns were created.

Attention was paid to the detailing of Takayama's handguns; a 4-inch Smith & Wesson Model 586 and an Model 49 Bodyguard, reflecting the Hiroshi Tachi's preferences, the guns was fitted with rubber grips to improve handling. From Returns onwards, the Model 586 was replaced by a custom-made Colt M1911. Takayama also frequently uses a long gun, and from Matamata onwards, scenes of him firing a Remington Model 31 while riding a motorcycle became a staple of the series.

For Ōshita, the 2-inch Colt Lawman—the same model used by the other detectives—was adopted. Unlike Takayama's, Ōshita's gun frequently changes, a 2.5-inch Colt Python (in Motto and Mottomo), a 2.5-inch Colt King Cobra (in Returns and Forever), a 3-inch S&W Model 586 in (in Madamada), and a 2-inch S&W Model 10 (in Final 5 Days and Home Coming).

The S&W Model 36 was chosen as Kaoru's handgun. Machida, a young detective who prefers a flashy style, initially used a 2-inch Colt Lawman, but switched to a 4-inch revolver with wooden grips midway through the first TV series. Subsequently, he used an S&W Model 29 (up through Mottomo), the S&W Model 586 (in Returns and Forever), and a Colt Python (in Madamada).

The handguns used by the other detectives are standardized as either the 2-inch Colt Lawman or the S&W Model 36, while uniformed officers carried the S&W M1917 or custom Model 36 (prop guns modeled after the New Nambu M60). These often appeared in Japanese police dramas before the 1990s, a time when mass-produced replicas of the M60 did not yet exist.

Since the 2005 Madamada, the handguns of the younger detectives have been largely standardized to the Glock 17 or 26.

=== Vehicles ===
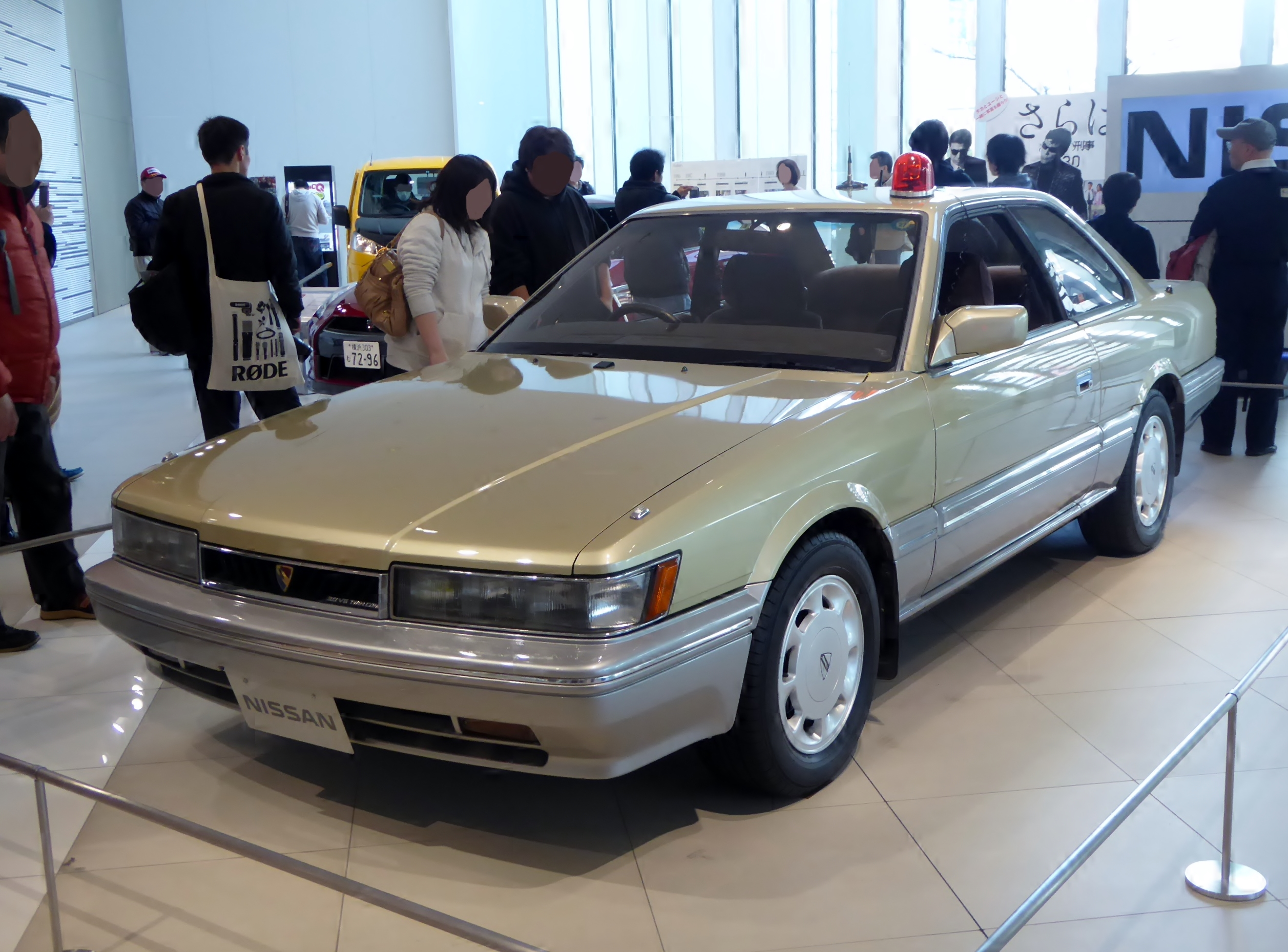
Pre-facelift Nissan Leopard 3.0 Ultima. Primarily driven by Ōshita.

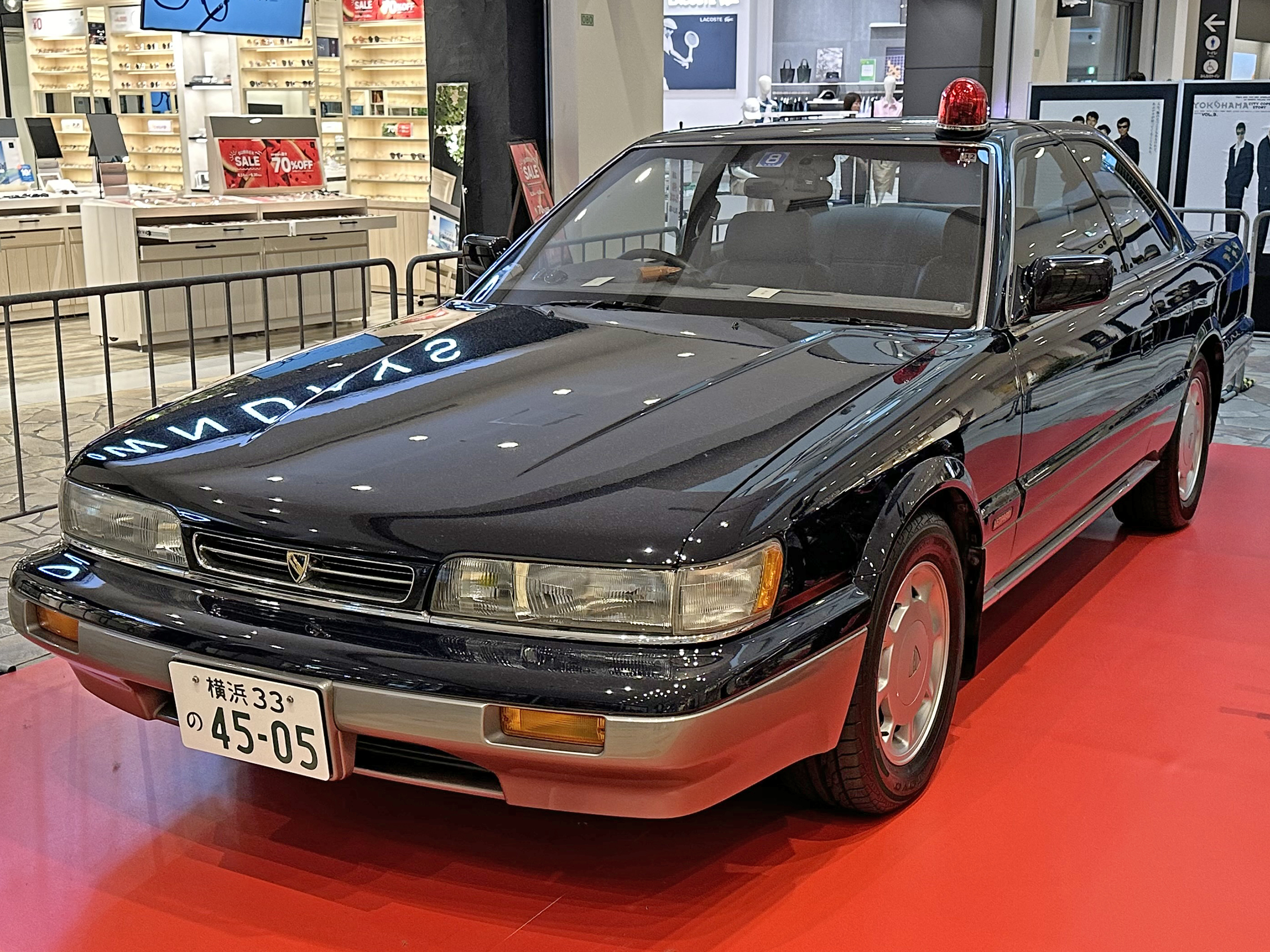
Post-facelift Nissan Leopard 3.0 Ultima Turbo. Introduced in Episode 5 of Motto, replacing the pre-facelift vehicle.

Much like Starsky & Hutch and Miami Vice, a key feature of this series is the significant attention garnered by the vehicles driven by the Takayama and Ōshita. In particular, the vehicles supplied by Nissan—used from the first TV series through the 1989 Mottomo have garnered a massive fan following, and replicas of these cars have been created.

While the detectives drove only the F31 Leopard and the Y30 Cedric/Gloria during the first TV series, the lineup expanded to include the latest models of the time in subsequent installments—such as the post-facelift R31 Skyline in the 1987 movie, the Y31 Gloria in Matamata, and the post-facelift F31 Leopard and A31 Cefiro in Motto, drawing even greater attention. Aside from the Leopard, the lineup consisted of car models that were actually widely used by the Japanese police as marked and unmarked police cars, which added to the realism. These unmarked Nissan police cars were later released as scale models by Aoshima Bunka Kyozai and TOMYTEC.

The cars primarily driven by Ōshita include the Nissan Leopard (F31), Alfa Romeo 164 Super 24V, Maserati Ghibli (AM336), Maserati Quattroporte (M139), Nissan Skyline Sedan (R34), Nissan GT-R (R35), and BMW 3 Series Convertible (E46). From Returns onwards, the cars primarily driven by Ōshita was switched to a foreign model; these were provided by importers or companies specializing in vehicles for film and television productions.

Meanwhile, Takayama—whose depicted as unable to drive a car—he would frequently commandeer motorcycles from civilians or the street to pursue suspects; in the TV series, these were exclusively Suzuki sports bikes—a brand Hiroshi Tachi promoted in commercials. From the Matamata onwards, he switched to using a Harley-Davidson chopper.

Regarding the vehicle suppliers after Mottomo, Mitsubishi Motors provided the cars for Returns and Forever The Movie, Mazda for Forever TV Special '98, and Nissan once again for the 2016 Final 5 Days.

== Episodes ==
The subtitle for each episode is a two-character compound word representing the guiding principles behind the actions of Takayama, Ōshita, or the various individuals involved in the cases.

Episodes of first TV Series

Episode No.	Title	Directed By	Original Air Date
1	暴走 (Bousou, lit. 'Out of Control')	Yasuharu Hasebe	October 5, 1986
2	救出 (Kyūshutsu, lit. 'Rescue')	Hiroyoshi Tezeni	October 12, 1986
3	挑発 (Chōhatsu, lit. 'Provocation')	Yasuharu Hasebe	October 19, 1986
4	逆転 (Gyakuten, lit. 'Turnaround')	Hiroyoshi Tezeni	October 26, 1986
5	襲撃 (Syūgeki, lit. 'Attack')	Yasuharu Hasebe	November 2, 1986
6	誘惑 (Yūwaku, lit. 'Temptation')	Yasuharu Hasebe	November 9, 1986
7	標的 (Hyōteki, lit. 'Target')	Tōru Murakawa	November 16, 1986
8	偽装 (Gisou, lit. 'Disguise')	Tōru Murakawa	November 23, 1986
9	迎撃 (Geigeki, lit. 'Interception')	Kiyoshi Nishimura	October 30, 1986
10	激突 (Gekitotsu, lit. 'Clash')	Yasuharu Hasebe	December 7, 1986
11	奇襲 (Kishū, lit. 'Surprise Attack')	Kiyoshi Nishimura	December 14, 1986
12	衝動 (Syoudou, lit. 'Impulse')	Tōru Murakawa	December 21, 1986
13	追跡 (Tsuiseki, lit. 'Pursuit')	Yasuharu Hasebe	December 28, 1986
14	死闘 (Shitō, lit. 'Deadly Fight')	Tōru Murakawa	January 4, 1987
15	説得 (Settoku, lit. 'Persuasion')	Yasuharu Hasebe	January 11, 1987
16	誤算 (Gosan, lit. 'Miscalculation')	Yasuharu Hasebe	January 18, 1987
17	不信 (Fushin, lit. 'Distrust')	Tōru Murakawa	January 25, 1987
18	興奮 (Kōfun, lit. 'Excitement')	Tōru Murakawa	February 1, 1987
19	潜入 (Sennyū, lit. 'Infiltration')	Haruo Ichikura	February 8, 1987
20	奪還 (Dakkan, lit. 'Recapture')	Yusuke Narita	February 15, 1987
21	決着 (Kettchaku, lit. 'Settlement')	Kiyoshi Nishimura	February 22, 1987
22	動揺 (Douyou, lit. 'Upset')	Kiyoshi Nishimura	March 1, 1987
23	策略 (Sakuryaku, lit. 'Artifice')	Hiroyoshi Tezeni	March 8, 1987
24	感傷 (Kanshō, lit. 'Sentiment')	Hiroyoshi Tezeni	March 15, 1987
25	受難 (Junan, lit. 'Suffering')	Haruo Ichikura	March 22, 1987
26	予感 (Yokan, lit. 'Premonition')	Haruo Ichikura	April 5, 1987
27	魔性 (Mashō, lit. 'Devilishness')	Tōru Murakawa	April 12, 1987
28	決断 (Ketsudan, lit. 'Decision')	Tōru Murakawa	April 19, 1987
29	追撃 (Tsuigeki, lit. 'Chase')	Yasuharu Hasebe	April 26, 1987
30	黙認 (Mokunin, lit. 'Connivance')	Yasuharu Hasebe	May 3, 1987
31	不覚 (Fukaku, lit. 'Blunder')	Takahito Hara	May 10, 1987
32	迷路 (Meiro, lit. 'Maze')	Yusuke Narita	May 17, 1987
33	生還 (Seikan, lit. 'Survive')	Takahito Hara	May 24, 1987
34	変身 (Henshin, lit. 'Transformation')	Yusuke Narita	May 31, 1987
35	錯覚 (Sakkaku, lit. 'Illusion')	Kiyoshi Nishimura	June 7, 1987
36	疑惑 (Giwaku, lit. 'Suspicion')	Kiyoshi Nishimura	June 14, 1987
37	暴発 (Bōhatsu, lit. 'Accidental Discharge')	Hiroyoshi Tezeni	June 21, 1987
38	独断 (Dokudan, lit. 'Arbitrary Decision')	Hiroyoshi Tezeni	June 28, 1987
39	迷走 (Meisō, lit. 'Lose Direction')	Tōru Murakawa	July 5, 1987
40	温情 (Onjō, lit. 'Warm Heart')	Tōru Murakawa	July 12, 1987
41	仰天 (Gyōten, lit. 'Astonishment')	Haruo Ichikura	July 19, 1987
42	恐怖 (Kyōfu, lit. 'Fear')	Haruo Ichikura	July 26, 1987
43	脱線 (Dassen, lit. 'Derailment')	Yasuharu Hasebe	August 2, 1987
44	苦杯 (Kuhai, lit. 'Bitter Cup')	Yasuharu Hasebe	August 9, 1987
45	謹慎 (Kinshin, lit. 'Restraint')	Yusuke Narita	August 16, 1987
46	脱出 (Dasshutsu, lit. 'Escape')	Yusuke Narita	August 23, 1987
47	報復 (Hōfuku, lit. 'Retaliation')	Kiyoshi Nishimura	August 30, 1987
48	無謀 (Mubō, lit. 'Reckless')	Haruo Ichikura	September 6, 1987
49	乱調 (Ranchō, lit. 'Confusion')	Kiyoshi Nishimura	September 13, 1987
50	狙撃 (Sogeki, lit. 'Sniping')	Takahito Hara	September 20, 1987
51	悪夢 (Akumu, lit. 'Nightmare')	Takahito Hara	September 27, 1987

== Series ==
=== TV Series ===
==== Motto Abunai Deka ====
1 season, 25 episodes (1988-1989). Motto Abunai Deka (もっとあぶない刑事; lit. 'More Dangerous Detective') is was essentially the second season of the show, produced in response to the success of the 1987 movie and calls for a sequel. While the style remains unchanged from the first TV series, the series has become more luxurious, with each character's costume becoming more elaborate and the in-show music newly recorded overseas. The Hiroshi Tachi's ending theme and Kyōhei Shibata's insert song were also changed to "Tsubasa wo Hirogete -open your heart-"(lit. 'Spread Your Wings -open your heart-'), and "TRASH".

Episodes of Motto Abunai Deka

Episode No.	Title	Directed By	Original Air Date
1	多難 (Tanan, lit. 'Full of Troubles')	Yasuharu Hasebe	October 7, 1988
2	攻防 (Kōbō, lit. 'Offense and Defense')	Yasuharu Hasebe	October 14, 1988
3	閉口 (Heikō, lit. 'Nonplussed')	Hiroyoshi Tezeni	October 21, 1988
4	奇策 (Kisaku, lit. 'Clever Scheme')	Hiroyoshi Tezeni	October 28, 1988
5	争奪 (Sōdatsu, lit. 'Scramble')	Yusuke Narita	November 4, 1988
6	波乱 (Haran, lit. 'Turbulence')	Yusuke Narita	November 11, 1988
7	減俸 (Genpō, lit. 'Salary Reduction')	Hiroyoshi Tezeni	November 18, 1988
8	秘密 (Himitsu, lit. 'Secret')	Hiroyoshi Tezeni	October 25, 1988
9	乱脈 (Ranmyaku, lit. 'Disorder')	Yasuharu Hasebe	December 2, 1988
10	悪戯 (Itazura, lit. 'Mischief')	Yasuharu Hasebe	December 9, 1988
11	結婚 (Kekkon, lit. 'Marriage')	Yusuke Narita	December 16, 1988
12	突破 (Toppa, lit. 'Breakthrough')	Takahito Hara	December 23, 1988
13	代償 (Daishō, lit. 'Compensation')	Takahito Hara	January 6, 1989
14	切札 (Kirifuda, lit. 'Trump Card')	Yusuke Narita	January 13, 1989
15	不惑 (Fuwaku, lit. 'Unfazed')	Haruo Ichikura	January 20, 1989
16	異変 (Ihen, lit. 'Anomaly')	Yasuharu Hasebe	January 27, 1989
17	乱心 (Ranshin, lit. 'Derangement')	Yasuharu Hasebe	February 3, 1989
18	魅惑 (Miwaku, lit. 'Fascination')	Hiroyoshi Tezeni	February 10, 1989
19	役得 (Yakutoku, lit. 'Perquisite')	Hiroyoshi Tezeni	February 17, 1989
20	迷惑 (Meiwaku, lit. 'Bother')	Yasuharu Hasebe	February 24, 1989
21	傷口 (Kizuguchi, lit. 'Wound')	Hiroyoshi Tezeni	March 3, 1989
22	暴露 (Bakuro, lit. 'Exposure')	Yasuharu Hasebe	March 10, 1989
23	心痛 (Shintsū, lit. 'Heartache')	Haruo Ichikura	March 17, 1989
24	急転 (Kyūten, lit. 'Sudden Turn')	Yasuharu Hasebe	March 24, 1989
25	一気 (Ikki, lit. 'All at Once')	Yasuharu Hasebe	March 31, 1989

=== TV Special ===
==== Abunai Deka Forever TV Special '98 ====
Produced to commemorate the 45th anniversary of Nippon TV, this project unfolded a storyline involving the international terrorist organization "NET" across two parts: a television special and a theatrical film. It pioneered a "media mix" approach that seamlessly integrated television and theatrical releases.

Title	Directed by	Original release date
"Abunai Deka Forever TV Special '98" (Japanese: あぶない刑事フォーエヴァー TVスペシャル'98) Transliteration: "Dangerous Detective Forever TV Special Ninety-eight"	Haruo Ichikura	August 28, 1998
Takayama and Ōshita arrest a gang of robbers at an oyster bar, but Ōshita is burdened with a large compensation claim due to the shootout. He is tempted by a high-paying job ad he finds online for "active police officers" and visits the warehouse designated for the interview, where he is attacked by two armed men. Ōshita shoots and kills one of them, but the other escapes. A large quantity of firearms and ammunition was seized. The escaped man is identified as Jojima, a criminal wanted by the FBI for kidnapping and bombings, and an organization called "NET" comes to light. Jojima demand the return of the confiscated firearms and ammunition, and learns that Asuka Kazefuki—a female idol who had accidentally hacked into NET's plans—is serving as the one-day police chief of Minato Police Station, Jojima launches an attack to the Minato Police.

=== Film ===
Original Japanese title Translated title	Directed by	Original release date
"Abunai Deka" (Japanese: あぶない刑事) Transliteration: "Dangerous Detective"	Yasuharu Hasebe	December 12, 1987
One night, Takayama and Ōshita were pursuing a suspicious vehicle. However, the police car accompanying them was blown up by a rocket rauncher, killing two uniformed police officers. Around the same time, at a research center of a major pharmaceutical company, two engineers in charge of new drug development were murdered, and data on an anti-cancer drug under development was destroyed. Based on eyewitness accounts, the Minato Police Station issued an arrest warrant for Hyōdō, a mercenary marked by pablic security police as a professional saboteur, as a suspect in both incidents. Meanwhile, Takayama and Ōshita obtained information about an art dealer named Narumi who had made a huge profit from the surge in the stock price of a rival company following the research center attack. They apprehended Narumi's female secretary, Yūki, to try and pressure him, but Hyōdō instead kidnapped Kaoru and demanded an exchange for Yūki at Yokohama Station.
"Matamata Abunai Deka" (Japanese: またまたあぶない刑事) Transliteration: "Yet again Dangerous Detective"	Haruo Ichikura	July 2, 1988
Takayama and Ōshita were investigating a man named Nagamine. He was a suspicious figure rumored to be involved in various illegal businesses, including gambling, prostitution, and drugs. One night, they arrested Ogata, a drug trafficker under Nagamine's influence. However, the next morning, Nagamine's legal counsel visited the Minato Police Station, and Ogata was released due to insufficient evidence. Immediately afterward, Takayama and Ōshita received a call from Ogata requesting protection, but during the call, Ogata was shot and killed by an unknown assailant. The keyword "bombing" that Ogata left behind before his death raised suspicions that Nagamine was planning a terrorist act. Therefore, Takayama and Ōshita sought the cooperation of Hagiwara, a female reporter who had been closely covering Nagamine, to exchange information.
"Mottomo Abunai Deka" (Japanese: もっともあぶない刑事) Transliteration: "The Most Dangerous Detective"	Tōru Murakawa	April 22, 1989
One night, Takayama and Ōshita raided a illegal gun manufacturing plant. The ringleader, Miyasaka, was a subcontractor for the Ginsei-kai gang and also a key asset in their plan to dismantle the organization. However, despite their surprise attack and pursuit, Machida's carelessness allowed Miyasaka to escape. While Takayama and Ōshita were pressuring Ginsei-kai chairman Maeo, it was discovered that Miyasaka's handgun was identical to one used in a murder case involving a trading company 15 years prior. The statute of limitations for that case was only four days away. As the Minato Police Station began a full-scale investigation, pressure from the prefectural police headquarters began to mount.
"Abunai Deka Returns" (Japanese: あぶない刑事リターンズ) Transliteration: "Dangerous Detective Returns"	Tōru Murakawa	September 14, 1996
Six years after Chief Kondō's retirement, Fukamachi arrives from the prefectural police headquarters as the new head of the Investigation Division. He is frustrated by the problematic behavior of Takayama and Ōshita and repeatedly scolds them. Meanwhile, the Minato Police Station busts a drug deal at a high-end club in Kannai district, but shortly afterward, the club is bombed. Takayama and Ōshita visit the hospital to question the injured hostess, Higuchi Asami, and stumble upon the scene where Asami is being kidnapped. After a fierce gunfight, Takayama and Ōshita manage to rescue Asami. As they continue their independent investigation behind Fukamachi's back, the existence of a cult organization called "Bremen" comes to light.
"Abunai Deka Forever The Movie" (Japanese: あぶない刑事フォーエヴァー THE MOVIE) Transliteration: "Dangerous Detective Forever The Movie"	Yusuke Narita	September 12, 1998
Immediately after Forever TV Special '98. Jojima's plans is stopped by Takayama and Ōshita, who seriously injure and arrest him. However, that night, he brutally murdered a nurse and a police officer and escape again. Meanwhile, the prefectural police headquarters, exasperated by Takayama and Ōshita's repeated reckless behavior, was about to order them to resign. However, Fukamachi was secretly lobbying headquarters and working tirelessly to prevent their resignation. Unaware of this, the two learned of an attack by the Jojima gang and tried to stop it. A clue from one of the Jojima gang members who died led to a man named Date emerging as the mastermind. Date was a one of its top executives of the international terrorist group NET and carrying out acts of sabotage around the world. Takayama and Ōshita try to stop Date's terrorist plans.
"Madamada Abunai Deka" (Japanese: まだまだあぶない刑事) Transliteration: "Still Dangerous Detective"	Kunio Torii	October 22, 2005
After the NET incident, Takayama and Ōshita were hired as undercover agents and were investigating criminal organizations in Asia. Then, in 2005, the two reunited in Busan, South Korea, at a scene where a Korean mafia and an international criminal organization were conducting a black market deal for a miniature nuclear bomb. Although they failed to secure the bomb, they seize control of the transaction site. After completing their major undercover assignment, the two returned to Yokohama, only to be shot by an unknown assailant. They were apprehended by Mizushima and Kanuma, two young detectives from the Minato Police Station who happened to arrive at the scene. Sensing a generational shift at the Minato Police, Takayama and Ōshita then encountered a case where Bitō, the perpetrator of a bank robbery they had arrested seven years prior, escaped from prison and began killing his former accomplices. Now reinstated as detectives, the two pursued Bitō.
"Saraba Abunai Deka" (Japanese: さらば あぶない刑事) Transliteration: "Dangerous Cops: Final 5 Days"	Tōru Murakawa	January 30, 2016
Takayama and Ōshita were just five days away from retirement. Despite the concern of Machida and Fukamachi, the two enjoyed fighting criminals until the very end, but they also harbored dreams for their post-retirement lives. Takayama, in particular, was about to embark on a new life with his fiancé, Natsumi. Their final target as detectives was Inō, a remnant of the Ginsei-kai, who was now a high-ranking member of the newly formed organization "Tōryū-kai", controlling an black market. They raided the scene and pursued Inō, but a mysterious rider thwarted their efforts, allowing him to escape. The next day, Inō was found dead. As the power balance between the crime organizations began to crumble, Kyōichi Garcia, a Japanese-American executive of the Central American crime organization "BOB", appeared. As Garcia attempts to turn the Tōryū-kai into a puppet organization by killing key figures, Takayama and Ōshita embark on their final investigation.
"Kaettekita Abunai Deka" (Japanese: 帰ってきた あぶない刑事) Transliteration: "Dangerous Cops: Home Coming"	Hiroto Hara	May 24, 2024
After retiring, Takayama and Ōshita, who had been running a detective agency in New Zealand, got into trouble with the local police, they returned to Yokohama and reopened their "T&Y Detective Agency". Ayaka Nagamine, who had come from Nagasaki searching for her mother, appears as their client. Ayaka's mother was a well-known Yokohama singer named "Natsuko", but she had traveled to Hong Kong and had been missing for about 20 years. Meanwhile, Takumi Kaidō, the president of the giant venture company "Hydonic" and son of Maeo, the second-generation chairman of the Ginsei-kai, was promoting a casino development project in collaboration with a Hong Kong company, aiming to "revitalize the Yokohama economy". A series of murders related to this project had occurred. Takayama and Ōshita visit Machida to ask for his help in finding Natsuko, but they find themselves targeted by mercenaries from Kaidō's armed security company.

=== Novel ===
Title	Written by	Original release date
"Abunai Deka 1990" (Japanese: あぶない刑事 1990) Transliteration: "Dangerous Detective Nineteen-ninety"	Hiroshi Kashiwabara	March 29, 2024
May 1990, shortly before Chief Kondō's retirement. A lawyer was found shot dead at a construction site in the developing Minato Mirai district. It was suspected that the murder was committed by Ebisawa, a hitman who had escaped from Takayama and Ōshita in 1985. Further investigation revealed that this murder was connected to a series of robbery-murder cases that Kondō had handled 15 years earlier. Ebisawa begins targeting individuals connected to an incident from 15 years ago. Takayama, Ōshita, and the rest of the Minato Police work hard to protect Chief Kondō and solve the case.

== See also ==
- Seibu Keisatsu Series (1979–84) Similar action-heavy police drama on ANN (TV Asahi). It shares the features of Hiroshi Tachi and Hiroshi Miki played detectives, and Nissan and Suzuki provided the vehicles. Incidentally, the Y30 Cedric Hardtop used in Abunai Deka was originally a vehicle used in PART III of this series.
- Gorilla: Metropolitan Police Department Investigation Unit 8 (1989-90) Another similar action-heavy police drama on ANN (TV Asahi). Tachi, Nakamura and Akiyama played detectives. The show includes references to Abunai Deka, such as Tachi and Nakamura mentioning "Minato Police" and reacting to a Mitsubishi Motors poster featuring Asano.
- Kattenishiyagare Hey! Brother (lit. 'Do Whatever You Want, Hey! Brother') (1989) A private detective drama set in Yokohama, produced by the same team behind the Abunai Deka and broadcast six months after the Mottomo. It stars Shibata, Nakamura, and Chujō. Abunai Deka mention as a show-within-a-show, with references made to Takayama, Ōshita, and "Papa" (Yoshii). Additionally, some cast members from Abunai Deka—including Yamanishi—make guest appearances.
- Case Closed (TV series) (1996–present) An anime series based on the manga series of same name. Broadcast on the same YTV (Nippon Television) network. Episode 25 of the first season featured a detectives modeled after the members of the Investigation Division (excluding Kondō and Tanimura) and a unmarked dark blue pre-facelift F31 Leopard. In 2024, an official collaboration was launched to coincide with the releases of Home Coming and The Million-dollar Pentagram.
- Bayside Shakedown Series (1997–present) A police drama series by the Fuji TV. Early episodes included references seemingly intended to rival the Abunai Deka: the murderer in the first episode is named "Fumio Tanaka"; and the 1998 film was shot at Queen's Square YOKOHAMA in Minato Mirai district, which is the jurisdiction of the Minato Police. Meanwhile, the scene in Abunai Deka Forever The Movie where Jojima attacks a transport vehicle was filmed in Odaiba, the setting of this series.
