= Keiichi Ozawa =

Japanese film director (born 1933)

- Born: January 5, 1933 (age 93); Kagoshima Prefecture, Japan
- Occupation: Film director
- Years active: 1956–present
- Known for: Outlaw series

Keiichi Ozawa (小澤 啓一, Ozawa Keiichi; born January 5, 1933 in Kagoshima) is a Japanese film director. He joined Nikkatsu studio and worked as an assistant director under Toshio Masuda. He made his director debut in 1968 with Outlaw: Gangster VIP 2. Including the Outlaw series, Tetsuya Watari appeared in most of the films he directed when he was a director of Nikkatsu company.

== Selected filmography ==
=== Film ===
- Outlaw: Gangster VIP 2 (1968)
- Outlaw: Goro the Assassin (1968)
- Outlaw: Black Dagger (1968)
- Outlaw: Kill! (1969)
- Big Boss: Outlaw (1968)
- Profile of a Boss' Son (1970)
- Women's Police: Swirling Butterflies (1970)
- Pay Off Your Debt! (1970)
- Earth Ninja Chronicles: Duel in the Wind or Doninki kazeno tengu (1970)
- Kantō Exile (1971)
- Tekkihei, Tonda (1980)
- Tale of the Crane Princess (1993)

=== Television ===
- Taiyō ni Hoero! (1972–78)
- Daitokai Series (1976–79)
- Daitsuiseki (1978) (ep.23 and 24)
- Tantei Monogatari series (1979–80) (ep.17, 18, 24 and 25)
- Seibu Keisatsu series (1979–84)
- Pro Hunter (1981) (ep.5 and 6)
