= Pro Hunter =

Japanese TV-series

- Also known as: プロハンター
- Genre: Detective Drama
- Directed by: Yasuharu Hasebe; Toru Murakawa; Keiichi Ozawa; Yoichi Saietc
- Starring: Masao Kusakari; Tatsuya Fuji; Kyōhei Shibata; Joe Shishido; Mayumi Ogawa
- Theme music composer: Akira Ōtsu; Kazuo Takeda
- Ending theme: "Lonely Heart" by Creation
- Country of origin: Japan
- Original language: Japanese
- No. of episodes: 25

Production
- Running time: 46 minutes (per episode)
- Production company: NTV

Original release
- Network: NTV
- Release: April 7 – September 22, 1981

Pro Hunter (プロハンター) was a Japanese comedy-action police TV series. It starred regulars Masao Kusakari, Tatsuya Fuji, Joe Shishido, Mayumi Ogawa, with Kyohei Shibata as a semi-regular. It ran for 25 episodes in 1981 and won popularity. Yoichi Sai made his debut as a director in the episode 15.

== Plot ==
Former detective Jun Mizuhara and former Journalist Shunsuke Ryuzaki set up office as a private detective agency " M&R Tantesha" in Yokohama. Their cases are always dangerous but not profitable.

== Cast ==
- Masao Kusakari as Shunsuke Ryuzaki (Ryu)
- Tatsuya Fuji as Jun Mizuhara (Mizusan)
- Joe Shishido as Detective Yuzo Kikushima
- Kyōhei Shibata as Goto
- Nenji Kobayashi as Detective Goro Kido
- Yuko Natori as Yumi
- Mayumi Ogawa as Reiko Tachibana
