= Moeru Tairiku =

- Theatrical release poster
- Directed by: Shōgorō Nishimura
- Written by: Jiro Ikushima
- Starring: Tetsuya Watari; Matsubara Chieko; Tatsuya Fuji
- Production company: Nikkatsu Corporation
- Release date: December 1968
- Country: Japan
- Language: Japanese
- Budget: 200 million yen

Moeru Tairiku (Japanese: 燃える大陸), also known as The Blazing Continent, is a 1968 Japanese film shot in Australia.

It was made the same year as another Japanese film shot in Australia, The Drifting Avenger.

== Plot ==
A young artist leaves Tokyo for Australia. He falls in love with a Japanese girl living in Australia.

== Release ==
Moeru Tairiku was released on December 14, 1968.
