= Seibu Keisatsu Special =

- Created by: Tetsuya Watari
- Directed by: Toru Murakawa
- Starring: Hiroshi Tachi; Satoshi Tokushige; Naho Toda; Ryōsei Tayama; Tsutomu Ikeda; Norihito Kaneko; Noboru Kimura; Kunio Murai; Ren Osugi; Tokuma Nishioka; Keiko Takahashi; Masaki Kanda; Tetsuya Watari
- Country of origin: Japan

Production
- Running time: 2 hours

Original release
- Network: TV Asahi
- Release: October 31, 2004

Seibu Keisatsu Special (西部警察 SPECIAL, Western Police Special) is a television drama produced by Ishihara Promotions (石原プロモーション, Ishihara Puromōshon) and broadcast on TV Asahi (テレビ朝日, Terebi Asahi.). The show aired on Japanese television on October 31, 2004, in conjunction with the 17th anniversary of the death of Yujiro Ishihara. It carries on the Seibu Keisatsu series, which was broadcast from 1979 to 1984. It portrays the efforts of the Hatomura Force (鳩村軍団) in combating terrorism. (Kogure's death means Daimon replaces him as Section Chief (課長) with Hatomura assuming the position of Force Leader (団長))

== Synopsis ==
Kazuma Tachibana, a Tokyo Police detective on liaison with the NYPD, and his partner, New York City Police detective Bob Anderson, chase a criminal named Chan in New York City. Upon his arrest, they learn that one of Chan's associates is a career criminal named Masaomi Niimi, wanted by Interpol on charges of passport fraud. They arrest Niimi, but in the process Anderson is fatally wounded and dies in Kazuma's arms. Overwhelmed by guilt and determined to avenge the loss of his partner, Kazuma joins his superior, Eiji 'Hato' Hatomura to escort Niimi back to Tokyo where he will stand trial.

Meanwhile, back in Tokyo, Section Chief Keisuke Daimon arrives at the Tokyo Metropolitan Police Western Division headquarters. Here Daimon receives news of Niimi's arrest. Bomb squad officer Naomi Kusaka is introduced. They are briefed by Chief Inspector Kengo Kusaka, supervisor of the counter-terrorism division. He tells them that a criminal known as "Makoto Suzuki" has been traveling to Chechnya regularly to purchase weapons from the Chechen Mafia, and was an associate of Niimi. Later that night, Daimon and Kengo go to a bar run by Naomi Kusaka's mother, Aiko, who plays the piano there. In the pub are several tagged bottles, one labeled 'Kogure-sama' (木暮 様). Daimon drinks a toast to Kogure, his late friend and superior. Meanwhile, Chan is killed by a mysterious Japanese man.

After escorting Niimii to headquarters, Kazuma is introduced to Section Chief Daimon and later, the officers interrogate Masaomi about several murders, for which he is wanted in addition to his passport fraud. While on the roof, Kazuma and Hato chat regarding what happened in New York City.

Kengo, Daimon, Hatomura and the other detectives are in the meeting room, where Kengo has brought information regarding Makoto Suzuki: he is currently in Japan and may be planning a terrorist attack. Acting on this tip the Hatomura Force (鳩村軍団) head for Miyazaki Prefecture, just as several officials, escorted by Kengo, arrive in Miyazaki for a counter-terror conference. Their arrival is watched by the same man who had killed Masaomi's associate in New York plus two of his cronies. The three are caught on airport security cameras. Hatomura now fears the worst.

The next morning his fears are confirmed when a terrorist group called 'Black Hawk' takes the investigators (including Kusaka) hostage and brings them into one of the hotel's dining rooms, in which one of the Japanese counter-terror officials is fatally shot. After the terrorists close the blinds to darken the room, their leader, Makoto Suzuki, arrives.

Eiji heads to Daimon's office and confirms the attack. In Miyazaki, Suzuki contacts the police with his only condition: release Niimii Masaomi or the hostages will be executed. Knowing the threat, the higher-ups reject the demand and proceed with plans to try to end the siege. An officer who tries to photograph the gunmen on a balcony of the hotel gets shot while Hatomura and Naomi arrive to assess the situation to plan a rescue for the hostages. They conclude that a direct assault is too risky, while a stealth operation is impossible with the tight security.

While covering up the dead, Japanese official Kengo silently takes his cell phone just as Suzuki activates a bomb that will go off in 8 hours. Kengo is able to get hints to the bomb's location when he sees the wording 'NS-990VR' on the back of a computer screen for the device's timer, while the team goes attempts to identify other gang associates.

A mechanic at the local Autobacs branch finds a paper with writing on it in the back seat of a vehicle he was cleaning. It turns out to belong to Toshio Hiura, a computer hacker who works for the gang. After confronting Hiura in an Internet cafe, he jumps to his death, the team learns that NS-990VR is the number for a tour bus that is currently in the city. They evacuate the bus but without enough time for Naomi to defuse it. Kazuma drives the empty bus, escorted by police units and a fire truck into a field with piles of sand. He jumps out a second before the bomb detonates.

Back in interrogation, Niimi reveals the existence of a second bomb planted by the group. He demands to be released if he discloses its location. This time they comply and show him to the gang, offering Kengo as proof of life. There they learn that Niimii and Suzuki are brothers whose parents were taken by foreign soldiers and executed.

Meanwhile, Kengo tries to get the location of the second bomb using the technique that helped determine the location of the first explosive device. He gets caught with the dead official's cell phone. While trying to flee, he is shot and killed by Makoto, much to the horror of the investigators. They decide to make the exchange in the lobby: Niimii for the other hostages while the other members of the Hatomura Force get into position to ambush the terrorists. After a brief brotherly hug Suzuki opens fire on Hato and a gun battle erupts, with a number of terrorists killed and most of the investigators wounded. The surviving terrorists escape in SUVs, triggering car chases that destroy several police cars.

Meanwhile, Naomi finds the body of her late father and superior and cries over it, but his death is not in vain as he was able to write on his hand the words Marine Express, a ferry where the second bomb is planted. While the remaining members go after Suzuki, Niimii and their cronies, Naomi locates the bomb. She is forced to remove her gear due to a laser scanner system that will trigger the bomb.

After following them to a quarry, Hatomura fatally shoots Nasaomi just as Suzuki gets him onto a helicopter.

Wearing only her latex suit Naomi crawls through the lasers and stops the bomb by jamming the trigger with her late father's pen. Back at the quarry, the police begin the assault on the Black Hawk headquarters, losing several police cars getting to rocket launcher-wielding terrorists. Under cover from the riot squad, they enter the HQ, where they subdue or kill the terrorists.

Inside the building however, Suzuki holds Kazuma at gunpoint, forcing Hato to disarm. However, Tachibana provides a distraction enabling him to escape and drawing Makoto and Hatomura into a fist fight until a pile of gravel nearly lands on them both. Suzuki is able to get the carbine, forcing Eiji to shoot him. However, while he calls out for Tachibana, the criminal mastermind is reaching for his Walther P99. This is however spotted by Kazuma and he shoots the ringleader. In spite of his injuries, Suzuki triggers the a bomb in the complex. The bomb detonates just as the Hatomura Force escapes, destroying HQ.

== Cast ==
=== Western Division officers ===
- Tetsuya Watari as Section Chief Keisuke Daimon: The Section Chief of the Daimon Force after Kogure's death.
- Hiroshi Tachi as Eiji 'Hato' Hatomura: The leader of the Hatomura Force and the officer in charge of the Tokyo-New York liaison.
- Satoshi Tokushige as Kazuma Tachibana: A Tokyo Police detective who is on liaison with the NYPD, later resumes duties back in Tokyo after the death of his partner.
- Naho Toda as Naomi Kusaka: A bomb squad officer who is the only female member of the Hatomura Force.
- Ryosei Tayama as Kosaku "Ban" Bando: A Sub-Inspector with the Western Division's investigative bureau; he is seen more as a supervisor in the office.
- Kimura Noboru as Osamu Mikami, the division's cyber-crime expert.
- Tsutomu Ikeda as Takayuki "Matsu" Matsuyama: The division's heavy weapons expert.
- Kenji Kaneko as Shohei Horiuchi: A very talkative loner who considers himself a rival to Tachibana.

=== Superior Officers ===
- Ren Osugi as Chief Inspector Kengo Kusaka: ad of the Counter-terror Division and Naomi's father plus a colleague of Daimon's who also respects the late Kogure, even having a fountain pen with his name just like Daimon. He later gives the team intel on the plans of Black Hawk during the Phoenix Seagaia siege but ends up sacrificing himself to ensure the success of the op.
- Kunio Murai as Uryu Shinsuke: Assistant Commissioner of the Western Division who is in charge of the investigation into Niimi and interrogator.

=== Antagonists ===
- Masaki Kanda as Makoto Suzuki (real name: Akira Niimi): Leader of the terrorist group Black Hawk and brother of Masaomi Niimi.
- Tokuma Nishioka as Masaomi Niimi: Brother of Makoto Suzuki. He was formerly a high-ranking officer of the Japanese Police but lost his job after a scandal, forcing him to turn to terrorism where he also learns about his long lost brother Akira (now named Makoto Suzuki), who had survived after their parents were executed by foreign soldiers when they were still young. He later dies just as Makoto gets him into a helicopter outside the Black Hawk terrorist HQ, forcing the chopper to leave with Masaomi's body in the rear.
- Kyosei Iwamoto as Member of Antagonist

=== Other Member ===
- Keiko Takahashi as Aiko: She runs the Corner Lounge, the bar that also has bottles of alcohol with tags that are hung in memory of Kogure.
