= Kyōhei Shibata =

Japanese actor and singer (born 1951)

- 柴田恭兵
- Born: August 18, 1951 (age 75); Shizuoka, Japan
- Occupations: Actor, singer
- Years active: 1975–present

Kyōhei Shibata (柴田恭兵, Shibata Kyōhei; born August 18, 1951 in Shizuoka, Japan) is a Japanese actor and singer. Shibata made his television debut in 1977 with Daitokai Part II as a guest. In 1978, Shibata made his first regular appearance in the police drama Daitsuiseki. Following year, he played a leading role for the first time in TV drama series Akai Arashi on TBS. In 1980, he won his first major award at the Elan d'or Awards for his role in Oretachi wa Tenshi da!. Shibata won great popularity through his role in Abunai Deka series.

== Filmography ==
=== Television ===
- Daitokai PartII (1977) (Guest ep.15)
- Taiyō ni Hoero! (1978), Tetsuo Tanimura (Guest ep.284)
- Daitsuiseki (1978), Detective Minoru Takimoto
- Akai Arashi (1979)
- Oretachi wa Tenshi da! (1979)
- Aoi Zesshō (1980–81), Tetsuo Suzuki
- Omoide Zukuri (1981), Norio Nemoto
- Pro Hunter (1981), Goto
- Sanga Moyu (1984)
- Abunai Deka (1986–87), Yūji Ōshita
- Motto Abunai Deka (1988–89), Yūji Ōshita
- Takeda Shingen (1988), Uesugi Kenshin
- Hamideka (1996-2005), Takami Hyogo
- Hagetaka (2007), Takeo Shibano
- Gen'ya (2010-2011), Detective Wataru Katō
- Gunshi Kanbei (2014), Kuroda Mototaka
- The Hippocratic Oath (2016), Tōjirō Mitsuzaki
- Bones of Steel (2020), Manzō Mitsuhashi
- The Great Passage (2024), Tomosuke Matsumoto

=== Film ===
- Chi-n-pi-ra (1984), Yōichi
- Michi (1986), Minoru Shinozuka
- Abunai Deka (1987), Yūji Ōshita
- Mata Mata Abunai Deka (1988), Yūji Ōshita
- Mottomo Abunai Deka (1989), Yūji Ōshita
- Fukuzawa Yukichi (1991), Fukuzawa Yukichi
- Bloom in the Moonlight (1993), Kōda Rohan
- Abunai Deka Returns (1996), Yūji Ōshita
- Abunai Deka Forever: The Movie (1998), Yūji Ōshita
- 69 (2004), Ken's father
- Half a Confession (2004), Detective Kazumasa Shiki
- Mada Mada Abunai Deka (2005), Yūji Ōshita
- Hagetaka: The Movie (2009), Takeo Shibano
- Dangerous Cops: Final 5 Days (2016), Yūji Ōshita
- The Confidence Man JP: Episode of the Princess (2020)
- Dangerous Cops: Home Coming (2024), Yūji Ōshita

=== Dubbing ===
==== Live-action ====
- Mad Max 2 (1984 Fuji TV edition), "Mad" Max Rockatansky (Mel Gibson)
- The Sting (1980 NTV edition), Johnny "Kelly" Hooker (Robert Redford)

==== Animation ====
- Balto, Balto

== Awards and nominations ==
Year	Award	Category	Work	Result	Ref.
1980	4th Elan d'or Awards	Newcomer of the Year	Himself	Won	
1987	10th Japan Academy Film Prize	Best Supporting Actor	Yabanjin no Yo ni, Michi	Nominated	
1992	15th Japan Academy Film Prize	Best Actor	Fukuzawa Yukichi, !［ai-ou］	Nominated	
1995	18th Japan Academy Film Prize	Best Actor	Shūdan Sasen	Nominated	
2005	28th Japan Academy Film Prize	Best Supporting Actor	Half a Confession	Nominated	
