= Aoi Zesshō =

- Genre: Drama
- Starring: Kyōhei Shibata; Ikue Sakakibara
- Country of origin: Japan
- Original language: Japanese
- No. of episodes: 18

Original release
- Network: TBS
- Release: November 21, 1980 – March 27, 1981

Aoi Zesshō (青い絶唱) is a Japanese television drama series that first aired on TBS in 1980.

== Cast ==
- Kyōhei Shibata – Tetsuo Suzuki
- Ikue Sakakibara – Hanako Suzuki
- Pinko Izumi – Sumire Suzuki
- Emi Watanabe
- Katsutoshi Arata – Hideharu Suzuki
- Gaku Yamamoto – Taichi Suzuki
- Haruko Mabuchi
- Hisashi Igawa
- Harue Akagi – Toyo Suzuki
- Eitaro Ozawa – Iwao Sawada
