= Omoide Zukuri =

- Genre: Drama
- Starring: Masako Mori; Yūko Kotegawa; Yūko Tanaka; Kyōhei Shibata; Takehiko Maeda
- Country of origin: Japan
- Original language: Japanese
- No. of seasons: 1
- No. of episodes: 14

Original release
- Network: TBS
- Release: September 18 – December 25, 1981

Related
- Chū to Kamisama

Omoide Zukuri (想い出づくり) is a Japanese television drama series that first aired on TBS in 1981.

== Cast ==
- Masako Mori
- Yūko Kotegawa
- Yūko Tanaka
- Kyōhei Shibata
- Takehiko Maeda
