= Ikue Sakakibara =

Japanese actress and a J-pop singer (born 1959)

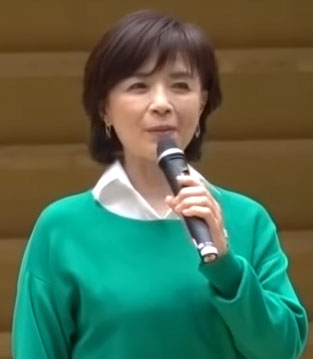
- Sakakibara in 2020
- Born: May 8, 1959 (age 67); Kawasaki, Kanagawa, Japan
- Other name: Ikue Watanabe
- Occupations: Actress, singer
- Spouse: Toru Watanabe (m. 1987; died 2022)
- Children: 2

Ikue Sakakibara (Japanese: 榊原 郁恵, Hepburn: Sakakibara Ikue; born May 8, 1959) is a Japanese actress and a J-pop singer.

== Biography ==
In 1976, Sakakibara took part in the Talent Scout Caravan organised by Horipro, and won the competition. She made her musical debut on January 1, 1977, with the single "Watashi no Sensei" (My Teacher). The Japanese press dubbed Sakakibara the "100 million yen Cinderella".

Sakakibara was promoted alongside Idols Mizue Takada and Yukiko Shimizu, who also debuted in 1977. They were dubbed the "Fresh San'nin Musume" (three fresh girls). Before them, Junko Sakurada, Momoe Yamaguchi and Masako Mori were promoted in the same fashion.

The single "Natsu No Ojousan"' (Summer Girl), provided Sakakibara with her biggest hit. It reached the number 11 position on the Oricon charts in the summer of 1978. That same year she was invited to appear on Kohaku Uta Gassen, and would subsequently make five more appearances on the show.

In 1981 Sakakibara debuted in the musical Peter Pan, which turned out to be a great success. Sakakibara played the part of Peter Pan for seven years on the stage.

In 1987, she married Japanese actor Toru Watanabe and gave birth to two sons. After her marriage she gave up her musical career, and began hosting television programs such as Monomane Battle.

== Notable singles ==
- "Itoshi No Robin Hood-sama" (My Darling Robin Hood), released on January 18, 1978. (Reached the No. 18 position on the Oricon charts.)
- "Natsu No Ojousan" (Summer Girl), released on July 1, 1978. (Reached the No. 11 position on the Oricon charts. Performed at the 29th edition of Kohaku Uta Gassen.)
- "Do It BANG BANG", released on October 1, 1978. ( Reached the No. 15 position on the Oricon charts.)
- "Seishun Kiryū" (Youth Airflow), released on April 1, 1979. (Reached the No. 21 position on the Oricon charts.)
- "Love Jack Summer", released on July 1, 1979.(Reached the No. 20 position on the Oricon charts. Performed at the 30th edition of Kohaku Uta Gassen.)
- "ROBOT", released on June 1, 1980. (Reached the No. 22 position on the Oricon charts. Performed at the 31st edition of Kohaku Uta Gassen.)
- "Shining Love" released on October 1, 1981. (Reached the No. 60 position on the Oricon charts. Performed at the 32nd edition of Kohaku Uta Gassen.)

== Filmography ==
=== Television ===
- Aoi Zesshō (1980)
- Kikai Sentai Zenkaiger (2021)
- Unbound (2025), midwife

=== Film ===
- Cherry Magic! the Movie (2022)
- Senseki (2025)
- Echoes of Kiriko (2026)
