= Savage Wolf Pack =

1969 film directed by Yasuharu Hasebe

- Film poster
- Directed by: Yasuharu Hasebe
- Screenplay by: Hideichi Nagahara, Ryuzo Nakanishi
- Starring: Tetsuya Watari; Tatsuya Fuji
- Cinematography: Shinsaku Himeda
- Music by: Koichi Sakata
- Distributed by: Nikkatsu
- Release date: February 22, 1969 (Japan)
- Running time: 84 minutes
- Country: Japan
- Language: Japanese

Savage Wolf Pack (Japanese: 野獣を消せ, Hepburn: Yajyū wo Kese) is a 1969 Japanese action film directed by Yasuharu Hasebe. It stars Tetsuya Watari. The film is considered the first film in the Nikkatsu New Action Film subgenre.

== Premise ==
When the bounty hunter Tetsuya Asai returns from Alaska, he learns that his sister, Satoko, has been killed by someone. One day he happens to see a gangster man wearing a Satoko's pendant.

== Cast ==
- Tetsuya Watari as Asai Tetsuya
- Tatsuya Fuji as Yada
- Tamio Kawachi as Sado
- Isao Bito as Noro
- Joe Akira as Taro
- Masao Shimizu as Yamamuro
