= Tantei Monogatari =

1979-1980 Japanese TV series

- Directed by: Keiichi Ozawa; Yasuharu Hasebe; Toru Murakawa
- Starring: Yūsaku Matsuda; Mikio Narita; Michihiro Yamanishi; Osamu Shigematsu; Hiroshi Shimizu; Tetsuo Nose; Tetsuro Maeda; Saburo Shoji; Hyoe Enoki
- Country of origin: Japan
- Original language: Japanese
- No. of episodes: 27

Production
- Running time: 45 minutes

Original release
- Network: Nippon TV
- Release: September 18, 1979 – April 1, 1980

Tantei Monogatari (探偵物語), or Detective Story, is an action Japanese TV series starring Yūsaku Matsuda that was originally broadcast on Nippon TV in 27 forty-five-minute episodes from September 18, 1979 to April 1, 1980. The show had various directors including Toru Murakawa, Kiyoshi Nishimura, Yukihiro Sawada and Yasuharu Hasebe.

== Plot ==
Shunsaku Kudō sets up office in a rundown building as a private detective after spending five years as a cop in San Francisco where he became familiar with firearms. Kudō was originally envisioned as a standard hard-boiled type but star Yūsaku Matsuda looked too much like a rebel so the character ended up riding a Vespa scooter, smoking Camel cigarettes and dressing in a black or white suit and sunglasses. Also living in the building are two young girls (American actress Nancy Cheney and Kahori Takeda) who fuss over the detective.

== Cast ==
- Yūsaku Matsuda as Shunsaku Kudo
- Mikio Narita as Detective Hattori
- Mitsuko Baisho as Masako
- Michihiro Yamanishi as Detective Matsumoto
- Nancy Cheney as Nancy
- Kahori Takeda as Kahori
- Tetsuo Nose as Tattoo Guy (first generation)
- Hiroshi Shimizu as Iizuka, the owner of the antique shop and the gunsmith
- Osamu Shigematsu as Dandy
- Yukiko Tachibana
- Ryoko Watanabe
- Hiromi Hirata
- Tetsuro Maeda as Tattoo Guy (second generation)
- Saburo Shoji as Saburo, the pimp
- Hyoe Enoki as Yamazaki, the informant

== Reception ==
Tantei Monogatari with its easy-going humorous style earned high ratings while on the air and later acquired a cult following. Nippon TV published a book about the show titled Yomigaere! Tantei Monogatari (Come Back! Detective Story) in 1994 and Toei Video later released the whole series. Toei also released the entire series as a boxed set of Blu-ray discs in 2015.
