= Abare Kishidō =

1969 film directed by Isamu Kosugi

- Film poster
- Directed by: Isamu Kosugi
- Screenplay by: Ryuzo Nakanishi, Kazuo Nishida
- Starring: Joe Shishido; Tetsuya Watari
- Cinematography: Shigeyoshi Mine
- Music by: Taichiro Kosugi
- Distributed by: Nikkatsu
- Release date: March 6, 1965 (Japan)
- Running time: 95 minutes
- Country: Japan
- Language: Japanese

Abare Kishidō (Japanese: あばれ騎士道) is a 1965 Japanese action film directed by Isamu Kosugi. It stars Joe Shishido and Tetsuya Watari. Tetsuya Watari made his acting debut in the film, playing the role of Joe's younger brother.

Joe participates in a European auto races, earns a lot of money and returns to Japan.

== Cast ==
- Joe Shishido as Joe
- Tetsuya Watari as Tetsuya
- Yaeko Mizutani as Nancy
- Chieko Matsubara as Yukari
- Jūkei Fujioka as Shimizu
- Yuji Odaka as Tsugawa
- Hiroshi Nihonyanaga as Shu
- Jun Hongo as Mike
- Keisuke Yukioka as Ishiguro
- Eiji Gō as Matsuoka

== Award ==
- Elan d'or Award for Newcomer of the Year : Tetsuya Watari
