= Outlaw: Gangster VIP =

- Theatrical release poster
- Directed by: Toshio Masuda
- Screenplay by: Kaneo Ikegami; Reiji Kubota
- Story by: Goro Fujita
- Starring: Tetsuya Watari; Chieko Matsubara; Tatsuya Fuji
- Cinematography: Kurataro Takamura
- Music by: Naozumi Yamamoto
- Production company: Nikkatsu
- Distributed by: Nikkatsu
- Release date: January 13, 1968 (Japan)
- Running time: 93 minutes
- Country: Japan
- Language: Japanese

Outlaw: Gangster VIP (Japanese: 「無頼」より 大幹部, Hepburn: Burai yori daikanbu) is a 1968 Japanese crime film directed by Toshio Masuda. The film stars Tetsuya Watari who plays Goro, a gangster who was sent to prison for three years for stabbing a hitman (Machida Kyosuke) who belonged to the rival gang called the Aokis. On his release from prison, Goro finds out his gang is in decline and learns that the hitman he stabbed is still alive.

== Production ==
Outlaw: Gangster VIP is based on the writings of Goro Fujita, an ex-gangster who wrote the novel the film was based on. The film was the first in a six-part series of films based on Goro Fujita's character.

== Release ==
The film was released in Japan on January 13, 1968. The film was released by Toho International in an English-subtitled version in the United States in May 1968.

Outlaw: Gangster VIP was shown at the Udine Far East Festival in 2005. The film had its Canadian premier at the Fantasia Film Festival on July 14, 2008.

Outlaw: Gangster VIP was released by Arrow Video on Blu-ray and DVD in 2016 as part of a box set of the entire series.

== Reception ==
Jasper Sharp of Midnight Eye stated, "Toshio Masuda didn't make the flashiest of works at Nikkatsu, but he made solid, reliable movies with great characters and well-crafted plots that always keep the viewer on their toes. Gangster VIP is a far more mature and serious film than most of Nikkatsu's akushun films from the 60s, benefiting from some great acting, especially from its lead Watari (Tokyo Drifter), and the poignant final scenes will stick in one's mind for a long time after the film is over."

== Cast ==
- Tetsuya Watari : Fujikawa Goro
- Chieko Matsubara : Hashimoto Yukiko
- Kayo Matsuo : Yumeko
- Kaku Takashina
- Sanae Kitabatake
- Tamio Kawachi
- Kyosuke Machida : Sugiyama Katsuhiko
- Yoshiro Aoki : Ueno
- Tatsuya Fuji : Suzuki
- Mina Aoe : Singer
- Mitsuo Hamada : Tsujikawa Takeo

== Sequels ==
=== Outlaw: Gangster VIP 2 / 大幹部 無頼 ===
- (Released date April 28, 1968) Directed by Keiichi Ozawa
- Tetsuya Watari : Fujikawa Goro
- Chieko Matsubara : Hashimoto Yukie
- Ryōhei Uchida; Kiuchi Tsuyoshi
- Kunie Tanaka : Nemoto Katsuji
- Akira Yamauchi : Kiuchi Ryusaku
- Masako Ota : Asami Keiko
- Kayu Matsuo : Sugiyama Yumeko
- Izumi Ashikawa : Suzuki Kikue
- Hideaki Nitani : Asami Kosuke

=== Outlaw: Heartless / 無頼非情 ===
- (Released date August 1, 1968) Directed by Mio Ezaki
- Tetsuya Watari : Fujikawa Goro
- Chieko Matsubara : Hashizume Keiko
- Koji Wada : Sawada Kenji
- Fumio Watanabe : Koga
- Kaku Takashina : Hashizume
- Ryoji Hayama : Sawada

Isao Tamagawa : Gohara

=== Outlaw: Goro the Assassin / 無頼 人切り五郎 ===
- (Released date November 2, 1968) Directed by Keiichi Ozawa
- Tetsuya Watari : Fujikawa Goro
- Chieko Matsubara : Isomura Yuki
- Tatsuya Fuji : Hayashida Masahiko
- Chitose Kobayashi : Hayashida Shinobu
- Masahiko Tanimura : Yosaku
- Asao Koike : Kaito Kensaku
- Koji Nanbara : Makino Shouji

=== Outlaw: Black Dagger / 無頼 黒匕首 ===
- (Released date December 28, 1968) Directed by Keiichi Ozawa, screenplay by Kaneo Ikegami
- Tetsuya Watari : Fujikawa Goro
- Chieko Matsubara : Miura Fujiko / Yuri
- Tamio Kawachi
- Sanae Kitabatake : Takemiya Sayoko
- Kunie Tanaka : Hongo Michio
- Kaku Takashina : Igawa
- Ichirō Nakatani : Miura Kensuke
- Ryoji Hayama : Tsuruoka Tatsuzo
- Shigeru Tsuyuguchi : Takemiya Kunimatsu

=== Outlaw: Kill! / 無頼 殺せ (1969) ===
- (Released date March 8, 1969) Directed by Keiichi Ozawa, screenplay by Hideichi Nagahara & Kaneo Ikegami
- Tetsuya Watari : Fujikawa Goro
- Chieko Matsubara : Asano Yumiko
- Koji Wada : Uno Isao
- Kenji Imai : Hirakawa Takamatsu
- Eiji Gō : Hanai Tetsuji
- Shinjirō Ehara : Moriyama Ken

== See also ==
- List of Japanese films of 1968
- Takeo Kimura filmography
