= Kantō Exile =

- Film poster
- Directed by: Keiichi Ozawa
- Written by: Goro Tanada
- Starring: Tetsuya Watari; Yoshio Harada; Masaya Oki; Ryohei Uchida; Kōji Nanbara; Kenji Imai; Mitsuko Oka; Michitarō Mizushima
- Music by: Taichiro Kosugi
- Distributed by: Nikkatsu
- Release date: February 6, 1971 (Japan)
- Running time: 85 minutes
- Country: Japan
- Language: Japanese
- Box office: Agency for Cultural Affairs

Kantō Exile (Japanese: 関東流れ者, Hepburn: Kanto nagaremono), also known as Kantō Drifter, is a 1971 Japanese yakuza film directed by Keiichi Ozawa. The revenge story of a man living in the world of a yakuza who was betrayed by his uncle and his brother.

== Cast ==
- Tetsuya Watari as Takimura Shuji
- Yoshio Harada as Gōda Seijirō
- Masaya Oki as Takimura Hiroshi
- Ryōhei Uchida as Yusuke Sakashita
- Kōji Nanbara as Abe Tsunehisa
- Kenji Imai as Okawa Teruo
- Mitsuko Oka as Tachibana Yuki
- Harumi Sone as Kishimoto
- Shōsei Mutō as Morikawa
- Yoshiro Aoki as Shirato
- Hiroshi Mizuhara as Hanai
- The Mops as Band Group
- Michitarō Mizushima as Tachibana Shigezaburō
