= Dangerous Cops: Final 5 Days =

- Poster

Japanese name
- Kanji: さらば あぶない刑事
- Directed by: Tōru Murakawa
- Screenplay by: Hiroshi Kashiwabara
- Based on: Abunai Deka
- Starring: Hiroshi Tachi; Kyōhei Shibata
- Distributed by: Toei Company
- Release date: January 30, 2016 (Japan)
- Running time: 118 minutes
- Country: Japan
- Language: Japanese
- Box office: ¥291.2 million

Dangerous Cops: Final 5 Days (Japanese: さらば あぶない刑事, Hepburn: Saraba Abunai Deka; lit. Farewell Dangerous Detectives) is a 2016 Japanese action film directed by Tōru Murakawa, written by Hiroshi Kashiwabara and starring Hiroshi Tachi and Kyōhei Shibata. The film is part of the film series based on the Abunai Deka television series. It was released in Japan on January 30, 2016.

== Cast ==
- Hiroshi Tachi as Toshiki Takayama
- Kyōhei Shibata as Yuji Oshita
- Atsuko Asano as Kaoru Mayama
- Tōru Nakamura as Tōru Machida
- Nana Kinomi as Yuko Matsumura
- Nenji Kobayashi as Shinzo Fukamachi
- Bengaru as Fumio Tanaka
- Ryo Yoshizawa as Kazunori Kawasumi
- Michihiro Yamanishi as Yoshizawa
- Junko Miyashita as Mis.Yoshizawa
- Ryuji Katagiri as Ryuji Okunishi
- Nanao as Natsumi Hamabe
- Kōji Kikkawa as Koichi Garcia

== Reception ==
The film grossed ¥291,191,700 on its opening weekend, with 217,273 admissions.
