= Chieko Matsubara =

Japanese actress (born 1945)

- 松原 智恵子
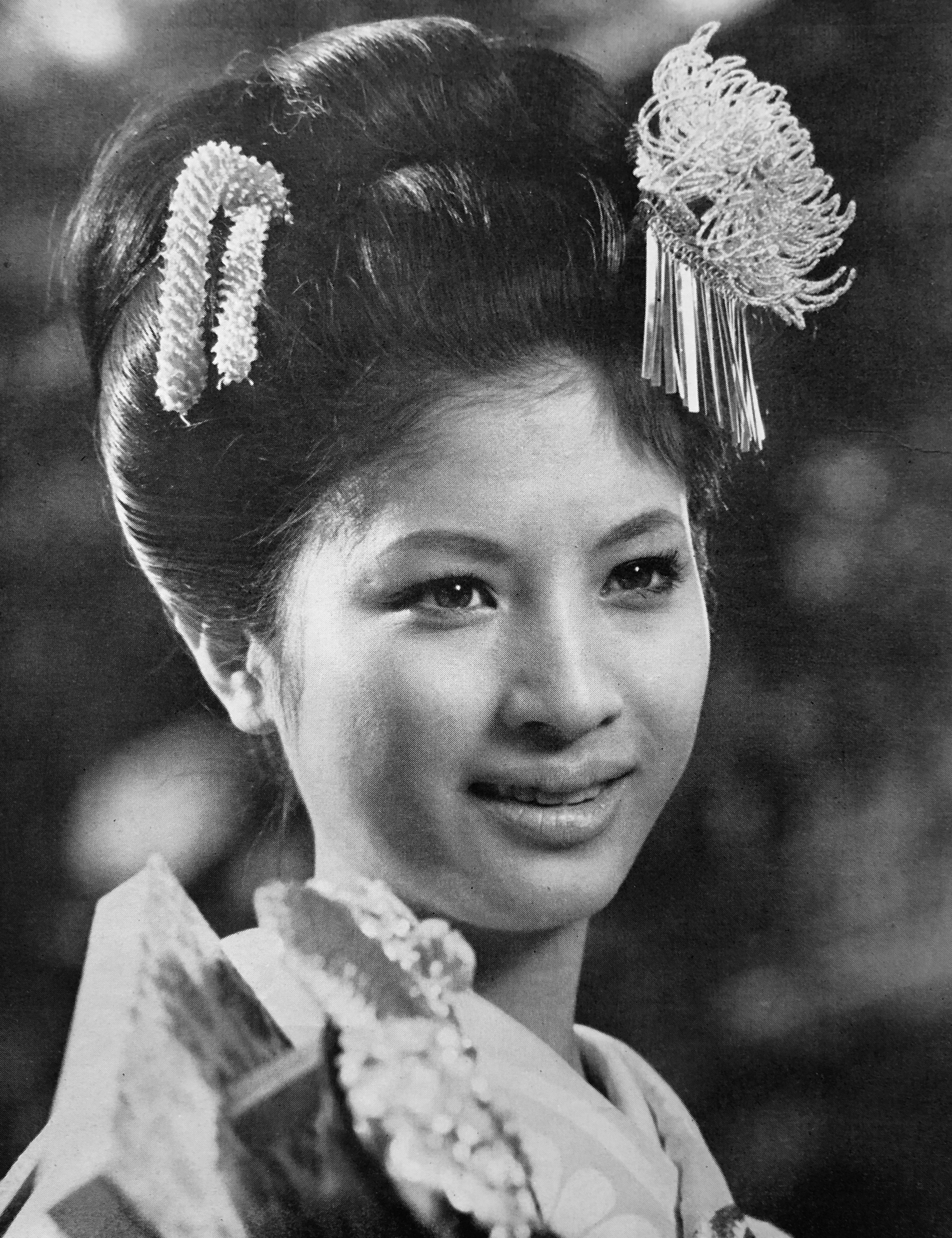
- Matsubara for the February 1965 issue of Movie Pictorial
- Born: 6 January 1945 (age 81); Nagoya, Japan
- Occupation: Actor
- Years active: 1961-present

Chieko Matsubara (松原 智恵子, Matsubara Chieko; born 6 January 1945) is a Japanese actress. She is best known for her roles in Tokyo Drifter (1966) and the Outlaw series.

Matsubara was born in Nagoya. Spotted at a beauty contest sponsored by the Nikkatsu studio, Matsubara made her debut in 1961 at age 16 in Yoru no chōsensha. Matsubara won popularity and became one of the representative actresses of the Nikkatsu. She appeared in over 100 films at Nikkatsu.

== Selected filmography ==
=== Film ===
Year	Title	Role	Notes
1963	Kanto Wanderer	Tokiko	
1964	The Flower and the Angry Waves	Oshige	
1964	Cruel Gun Story		
1964	Our Blood Will Not Forgive	Yasuko	
1965	Taking The Castle		
1965	Abare Kishidō		
1966	Tokyo Drifter		
1966	Tokyo Drifter 2: The Sea is Bright Red as the Color of Love		
1966	Black Tight Killers		
1968	Bonta No Kekkon Ya		
1968	Outlaw: Gangster VIP	Yukie Hashimoto	
1970	Men and War Part I	Motoko Takahata	
1976	New Battles Without Honor and Humanity: Last Days of the Boss	Asami Nakamichi	
1997	To Love	Yamagata	
2002	Dolls		
2004	Blooming Again		
2011	Made in Japan: Kora!		
2013	Kiiroi Zou		
2016	Yuzu no Ha Yurete		
2017	Our Meal for Tomorrow	Meiko Uemura	
2018	Kimi ga Mata Hashiridasu toki		
2019	Egao no Mukou ni		
2019	A Long Goodbye	Yōko Higashi	
2020	Sengoku Girl and Kendō Boy		
2021	Nishinari Goro's 400 Million Yen		
2023	Natchan's Little Secret	Keiko	
2024	Teppen no Ken		
2025	Akashi	Wakako	

=== Television ===
Year	Title	Role	Notes	Ref
1973	Kunitori Monogatari	Oichi	Taiga drama	
2010	Ryōmaden	Sakamoto Iyo	Taiga drama	
2022	Come Come Everybody	Old Kiyoko Akanishi	Asadora	

== Honours ==
- Kinuyo Tanaka Award (2016)
- Sochi Film Festival Best Actress Award (2016) : Yuzu no Ha Yurete
