= Daitsuiseki =

- Also known as: 大追跡
- Genre: Detective Drama
- Created by: Hirokichi Okada (NTV)
- Directed by: Yasuharu Hasebe; Toru Murakawa; Keiichi Ozawaetc
- Starring: Yūzō Kayama; Masaya Oki; Kyōhei Shibata; Naomi Hase; Tatsuya Fuji
- Music by: Yuji Ohno
- Country of origin: Japan
- Original language: Japanese
- No. of episodes: 26

Production
- Producers: Tsutomi Yamaguchi (NTV); Koichi Ishii (Toho)
- Running time: 46 minutes (per episode)
- Production company: Toho Co., Ltd.

Original release
- Network: NNS (NTV)
- Release: April 4, 1978 – September 26, 1981

Daitsuiseki (大追跡, , literally The Great Chase) was a Japanese comedy-action police TV series. It starred regulars Yūzō Kayama, Masaya Oki, Tatsuya Fuji, Naomi Hase, and Kyohei Shibata, with Fumio Watanabe as a semi-regular. It ran for twenty-six episodes in 1978 and won popularity. It is noted for the ad-libbing and jokes by the cast and staff, which became more frequent as the show wore on.

Kyohei Shibata appeared as regular cast for the first time in TV drama series.

The final episode was directed by Toru Murakawa who was simultaneously directing the film Satsujin Yūgi featuring Yūsaku Matsuda and Yutaka Nakajima, and thus pulled them in for cameo roles.

== Cast ==
- Yūzō Kayama as Eiichi Nitta
- Tatsuya Fuji as Shinsuke Mizuhara
- Masaya Oki as Shiro Yabuki
- Kyōhei Shibata (actor) as Minoru Takimoto
- Naomi Hase as Kayoko Yuki
- Fumio Watanabe as Iwao Takaoka

== Episodes ==
- 1. Haienaga Atsumatta directed by Yasuharu Hasebe
- 2. Snaipah no Megahikaku directed by Yasuharu Hasebe
- 3. Akujo ga Odoru directed by Tōru Murakawa
- 4. Dono wo Ute directed by Tōru Murakawa
- 5. Sennyu Keiji directed by Yasuharu Hasebe
- 6 .Waruwa Nemurasero directed by Yasuharu Hasebe
- 7. Satsutaba to Akaibara directed by Tōru Murakawa
- 8. Hissino Tsuiso directed by Tōru Murakawa
- 9. Genkin Yusousha Godatsu directed by Yukihiro Sawada
- 10. Mimi directed by Yukihiro Sawada
- 11. Mehyoga Tanda directed by Yukio Noda
- 12. Koroshiya ni Hakaganai directed by Yukio Noda
- 13. Yokohama Chinpirabugi directed by Tōru Murakawa
- 14. Daigyakuten directed by Tōru Murakawa
- 15. Kuroikage directed by Ken Matsumori
- 16. Bōkōma W directed by Kiyoshi Nishimura
- 17. Koroshiya directed by Kiyoshi Nishimura
- 18. Lady killer directed by Ken Matsumori
- 19. Gofuyona Teishu Shimatsushimasu directed by Kazutaka Sakurai
- 20. Hinomaru Gurentai directed by Kazutaka Sakurai
- 21. Kikenna Highway directed by Kiyoshi Nishimura
- 22. Jyunoko no Mystery zone directed by Kiyoshi Nishimura
- 23. Satsujin Wanted directed by Keiichi Ozawa
- 24. Bōsatsuma directed by Keiichi Ozawa
- 25. Yokohama connection directed by Yōnosuke Koike
- 26. Sayonara wa Dangande directed by Tōru Murakawa

== Links ==
- Information and episode guide (in Japanese)
