= Tetsuya Watari =

Japanese actor (1941–2020)

- 渡 哲也
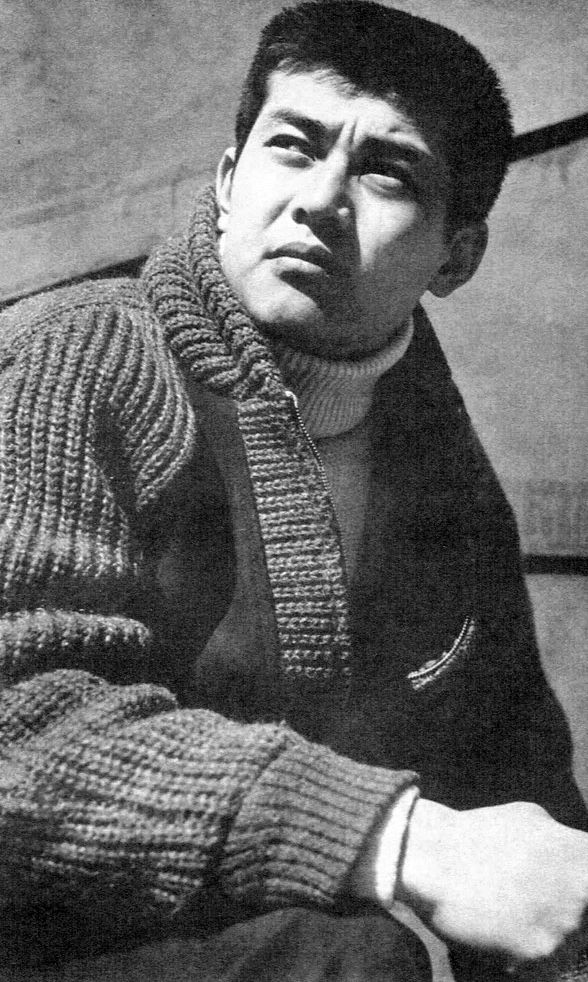
- Watari in 1965
- Born: Michihiko Watase (渡瀬 道彦); December 28, 1941; Awaji, Hyōgo, Japan
- Died: August 10, 2020 (aged 78); Tokyo, Japan
- Occupation: Actor
- Years active: 1964–2020
- Relatives: Tsunehiko Watase (brother)

Tetsuya Watari (渡 哲也, Watari Tetsuya) born Michihiko Watase (渡瀬 道彦, Watase Michihiko) (December 28, 1941 – August 10, 2020) was a Japanese film, stage, and television actor.

== Life ==
He graduated from Aoyama Gakuin University. Watari belonged to the karate club at university. He made his screen debut in 1964, in Isamu Kosugi's Abare Kishidō, and received one of the Elan d'or Awards. At Nikkatsu, Watari starred in such films as Seijun Suzuki's Tokyo Drifter and Toshio Masuda's Outlaw series.

Watari was mentored at Nikkatsu by Yujiro Ishihara. When Nikkatsu shifted to focusing on Roman Porno films in the early seventies, Watari was one of many actors who left the studio.

Watari was due to play the main role in Kinji Fukasaku’s film Battles Without Honor and Humanity, but because of illness he was not able to appear. In 1974, he was forced to step down from the lead role of Katsu Kaishū in the Taiga drama Katsu Kaishū on NHK, again because of illness, after appearing in only nine episodes. In 1976, Watari won best actor of Blue Ribbon Award for his role in Kinji Fukasaku`s film Yakuza Graveyard.

In Japan, Watari is probably still best known for his role as Keisuke Daiomon in the detective series "Seibu Keisatsu" on TV Asahi. He also appeared in the popular detective drama "Taiyō ni Hoero!" as a replacement for Yujiro Ishihara in 1986.

Watari became the president of Ishihara Promotion after Yujiro's death in 1987 but in 2011 he resigned due to his declining health.

On June 10, 2015 he was hospitalised after suffering a heart attack and underwent surgery. Seven days later it was announced that he was in rehabilitation and would be discharged from hospital in about a month.

He had a younger brother, Tsunehiko Watase, who was also an actor. As a singer, Watari is known for his hit song "Kuchinashi no Hana" and he appeared in the Kōhaku Uta Gassen in 1974 and 1993.

He died of pneumonia on August 10, 2020, at the age of 78.

== Selected filmography ==
=== Films ===
Year	Title	Role	Other notes	Ref.
1965	Abare Kishidō (あばれ騎士道)	Tetsuya	Lead role	
1965	Nakaseruze			
1966	Tokyo Drifter	Tetsuya "Phoenix Tetsu" Hondo	Lead role	
1966	Tokyo Drifter 2: The Sea is Bright Red as the Color of Love	Tetsuya "Phoenix Tetsu" Hondo	Lead role	
1966	The Hearth of Hiroshima		Lead role	
1967	Kurenai no Nagareboshi		Lead role	
1968	Outlaw: Gangster VIP	Gorō Fujikawa	Lead role	
1968	Moeru Tairiku	Keiichi Isomura	Lead role	
1968	Higashi Shinakai	Naoyuki		
1969	The Wild Sea	Yōji Kitami	Lead role	
1969	Daikanbu Nagurikomi	Tetsu	Lead role	
1969	Savage Wolf Pack	Asai Tetsuya	Lead role	
1970	Shinjuku outlaw: Step On the Gas	Yuji Nishigami (Shinigami)	Lead role	
1970	Fuji sanchō			
1971	Kantō Exile		Lead role	
1973	Gokiburi Keiji	Detective Narugami	Lead role	
1973	Za Gokiburi	Detective Narugami	Lead role	
1973	Ningen Kakumei	Kumichō Shimatani		
1975	Graveyard of Honor	Rikio Ishikawa	Lead role	
1976	Yakuza Graveyard	Detective Kuroiwa	Lead role	
1986	Tokei – Adieu l'hiver		Special appearance	
1993	Kinchan no Cinema Jack "Minato"			
1996	Waga Kokoro no Ginga Tetsudō Miyazawa Kenji Monogatari	Seijirō		
1997	Yūkai	Inspector Tsunami	Lead role	
1998	Diary of Early Winter Shower		Lead role	
2000	Nagasaki Burabura bushi	Gakusha (Koga, Jûjirô)	Lead role	
2001	Brother	Jinseikai Kumichō		
2002	Shura no Mure	Old Hiroyuki Inahara		
2004	Lady Joker	Seizo Monoi	Lead role	
2005	Yamato	Vice-Admiral Seiichi Itō		

=== Television ===
Year	Title	Role	Other notes	Ref.
1971	Daichūshingura	Horibe Yasubei		
1974	Katsu Kaishū	Katsu Kaishū	Lead role, Taiga drama	
1976–1979	Daitokai Series	Raisuke Kuroiwa	Lead role	
1978	Haguregumo	Kumo	Lead role	
1979–1984	Seibu Keisatsu	Keisuke Daimon	Lead role	
1986	Taiyō ni Hoero!	Hyōgo Tachibana		
1996	Hideyoshi	Oda Nobunaga	Taiga drama	
1998	Shinsengumi Keppūroku	Isami Kondō	Lead role	
2004	Seibu Keisatsu Special	Keisuke Daimon		
2005	Yoshitsune	Taira no Kiyomori	Taiga drama	
2009–2011	Clouds Over the Hill	Tōgō Heihachirō		
2013	No Dropping Out: Back to School at 35	Yukinobu Asada		

=== Video games ===
Year	Title	Role	Other notes	Ref.
2005	Ryū ga Gotoku	Shintaro Kazama		
2006	Ryū ga Gotoku 2	Shintaro Kazama		
2009	Ryū ga Gotoku 3	Jōji Kazama	Known as "Joji Fuma" in Western PS3 release	
2015	Ryū ga Gotoku 0: Chikai no Basho	Shintaro Kazama		
2016	Ryū ga Gotoku: Kiwami	Shintaro Kazama		
2017	Ryū ga Gotoku: Kiwami 2	Shintaro Kazama		

== Honours ==
- Medal with Purple Ribbon (2005)
- Order of the Rising Sun, 4th Class, Gold Rays with Rosette (2013)
