= Tōru Murakawa =

Japanese film director (born 1937)

- Born: 1937 (age 88–89); Japan
- Occupation: Film director

Tōru Murakawa (村川透, Murakawa Tōru; born March 1937 in Yamagata Prefecture) is a Japanese film director. He is most famous for his collaborations with the actor Yūsaku Matsuda in both film and television.

== Filmography ==
=== Film ===
- The Most Dangerous Game (1978)
- The Killing Game (1978)
- The Resurrection of the Golden Wolf (1979)
- The Execution Game (1979)
- The Beast To Die (1980)
- Lucky 13 (Li ti Shi san mei, 1986)
- Mottomo Abunai Deka (1989)
- Best Guy (1990)
- Abunai Deka Returns (1996)
- Dangerous Cops: Final 5 Days (2016)
- Last Dance (2027)

=== Television ===
- Daitokai (1976–79)
- Daitsuiseki (1978) (ep. 3, 4, 7, 8, 13, 14, 26)
- Tantei Monogatari (ep. 1, 2, 15, 16, 20, 21)
- Seibu Keisatsu series
- Shōgun no Onmitsu! Kage Jūhachi (1996)
- Seibu Keisatsu Special (2004)
