= Seibu Keisatsu =

Television series

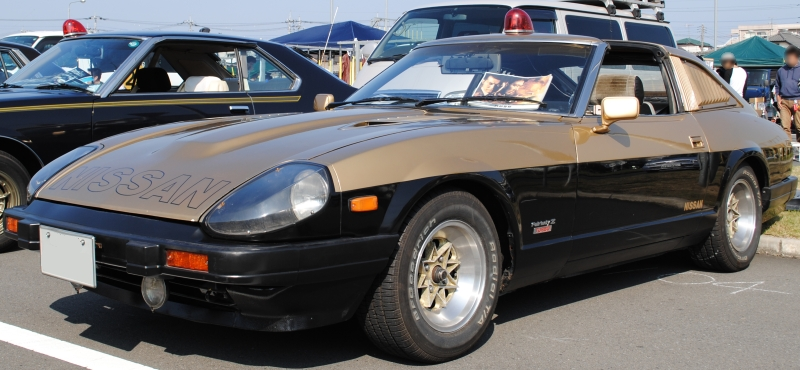
- Replica of Super Z (スーパーZ)
- Directed by: Keiichi Ozawa; Yasuharu Hasebe; Toru Murakawa
- Starring: Tetsuya Watari; Hiroshi Tachi; Tomokazu Miura; Akira Terao; Akiji Kobayashi; Jūkei Fujioka; Shunsuke Kariya; Takayuki Godai; Yūko Kotegawa; Yujiro Ishihara; Yoshizumi Ishihara; Toshio Shiba; Shōbun Inoue; Eiken Shōji; Ryuta Mine; Ryu Kano; Hiroshi Miki; Kenji Sahara; Shosei Muto; Hisayuki Yamane; Junichi Takagi
- Narrated by: Kiyoshi Kobayashi
- Country of origin: Japan
- No. of seasons: 3 TV series, 1 Special
- No. of episodes: 238

Production
- Running time: 54 minutes

Original release
- Network: ANN (TV Asahi)
- Release: October 10, 1979 – October 22, 1984

Seibu Keisatsu (Japanese: 西部警察; lit. Western Police) is a Japanese television drama series produced by Ishihara Promotions (石原プロモーション, Ishihara puromōshon) and broadcast on TV Asahi and its affiliates.

== Plot ==
The series portrays the Western Police Headquarters Criminal Investigation Division's Sergeant Keisuke Daimon, played by Tetsuya Watari and his subordinates, dubbed the Daimon Force (大門軍団, Daimon Gundan), and their superior, Section Chief Kogure, played by Yujiro Ishihara, as they fight against Tokyo's underworld.

With its flashy, over-the-top explosion scenes, and car stunts, this series gained a reputation as a macho drama. It is representative of the police & detective dramas of the 1980s.

== Series ==
- Seibu Keisatsu (10/14/1979 – 4/18/1982)
- Seibu Keisatsu Part II (5/30/1982 – 3/20/1983)
- Seibu Keisatsu Part III (4/3/1983 – 10/22/1984)
- Seibu Keisatsu Special (10/31/2004)

== Cast ==
- Tetsuya Watari : Keisuke Daimon
- Akiji Kobayashi : Chotaro Minami
- Akira Terao : Takeshi Matsuda
- Hiroshi Tachi : Sotaro Tatsumi / Eiji Hatamura
- Tomokazu Miura : Goro Okita
- Yoshizumi Ishihara : Jun Godai
- Toshio Shiba : Shinnosuke Yamagata
- Shunsuke Kariya : Hiroshi Genda
- Shōbun Inoue : Gentaro Hama
- Eiken Shōji : Takeshi Ninomiya
- Jūkei Fujioka : Daisaku Tani
- Akifumu Inoue : Gentaro Hama
- Akiji Kobayashi : Chotaro Minami
- Ryuta Mine : Ippei Hirao
- Yuko Kotegawa : Akiko Daimon
- Yujiro Ishihara : Kenzo Kogure
- Takayuki Godai : Hitoshi Kaneko
- Ryu Kano : Kazuma Kiryu
- Hiroshi Miki : Taku Hojo
- Kenji Sahara : Asahina, the bartender
- Shosei Muto : Senior uniformed police officer
- Hisayuki Yamane : Club member
- Junichi Takagi : Kanichi Sagawa

== Statistics ==
During the 5-year course of the show, a total of 238 episodes were filmed, with roughly 4,680 vehicles of all types being destroyed during the course of filming, 4.8 tons of explosives being used as well as close to 320 buildings destroyed. Surprisingly, no deaths were recorded, though there were six injured staff and crew members. The average viewer rating was at 14.5% in the Kanto Area.

== Vehicles ==
=== Daimon Force ===
Nissan provided a wide variety of vehicles for the show, most notably for use as police vehicles as well as villain vehicles. The majority of the patrol cars in the show are a mix of Nissan Laurel, Gloria, Cedric as well as Skyline sedans. For vehicle wrecking scenes the 230 and 330 model Cedrics, Glorias and Laurels were mainly used; as the filming staff had strict orders not to damage any of the 430 model Cedric marked patrol cars.

The series also had several notable cars used by the main heroes, including RS Machines 1 to 3, all of which were based on the Nissan Skyline DR30 Turbo RS; as well as Machine-X, a modified Nissan Skyline 2000 TURBO GT-E (HGC211) used primarily by Chief Daimon. There was also Super-Z: a modified Nissan 280ZX 2+2 with gull-wing doors, turbocharger, nitrous, computers, and also quad 20mm guns mounted on the hood. More noteworthy vehicles include a 1980 Nissan Safari which was also heavily modified with a radar camera, computer and also a water cannon with a water pressure so high it was shown to be able to flip a car; three modified Nissan Skylines, dubbed RS vehicles (all modified for special use by the Daimon Force) and a 1980 Nissan Gazelle convertible, which was Section Chief Kogure's personal vehicle. Being a motorcycle cop from the beginning of the series Eiji Hatomura (played by Hiroshi Tachi) used modified Suzuki motorcycles; in particular a GSX1100 Katana, which was his character's favourite bike in the series.

Almost all of the special vehicles are as of today, preserved by Ishihara Promotion.

Daimon Force automobiles

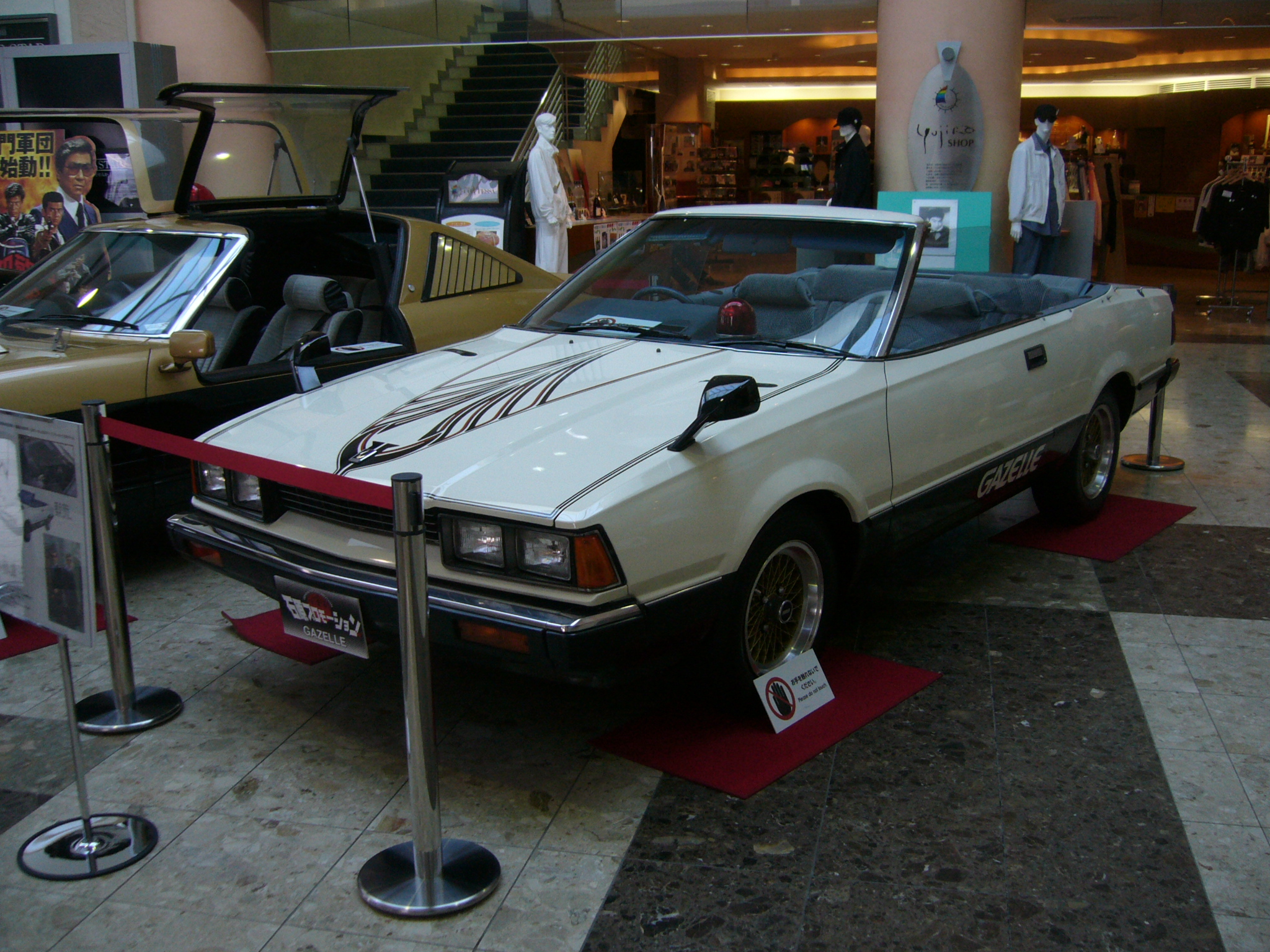
Kogure's Nissan Gazelle, modified to a convertible

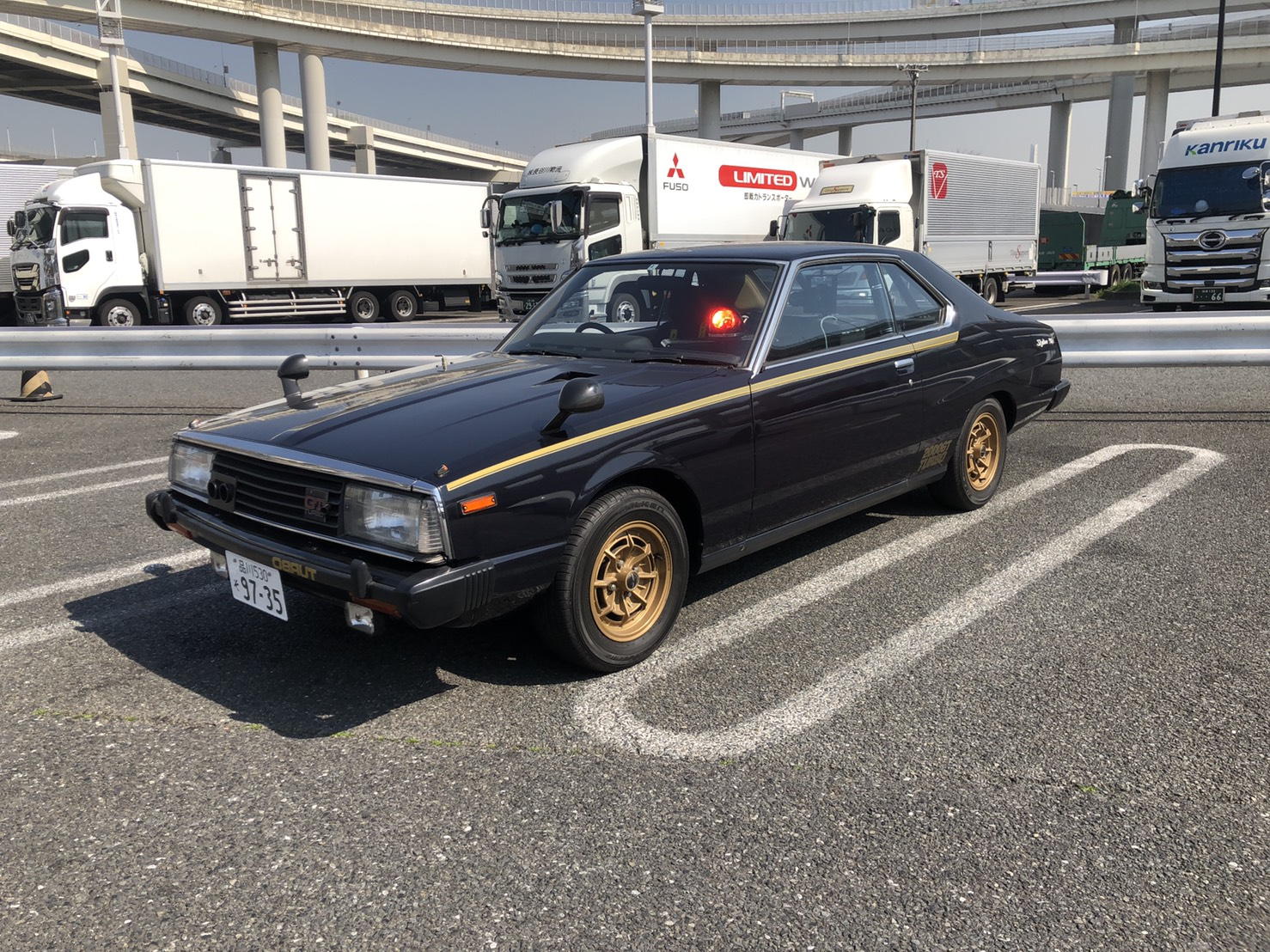
Daimon's Machine X, a modified Nissan Skyline (C211) 2000 Turbo GT-E

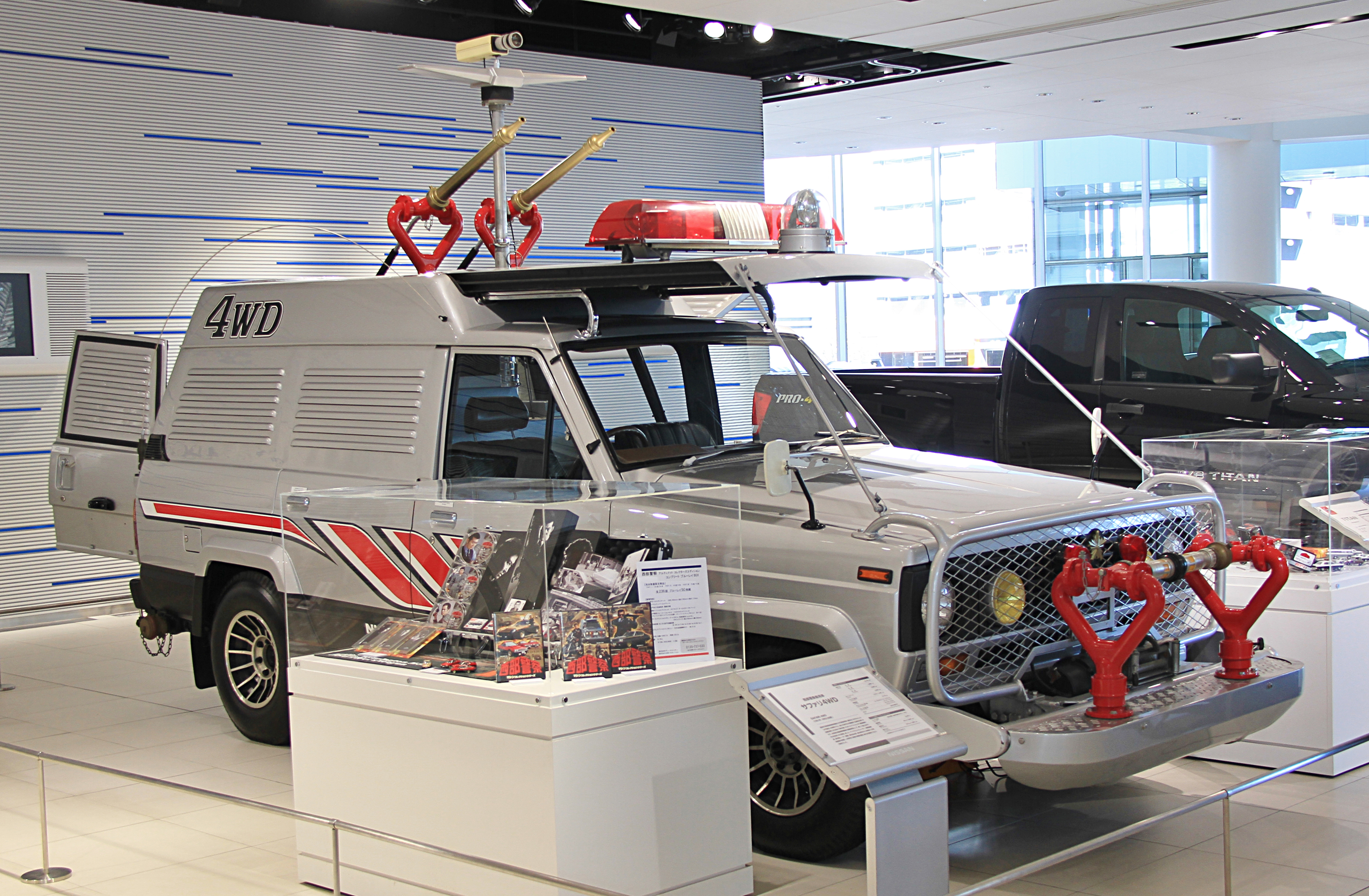
Nissan Safari, equipped with water cannons

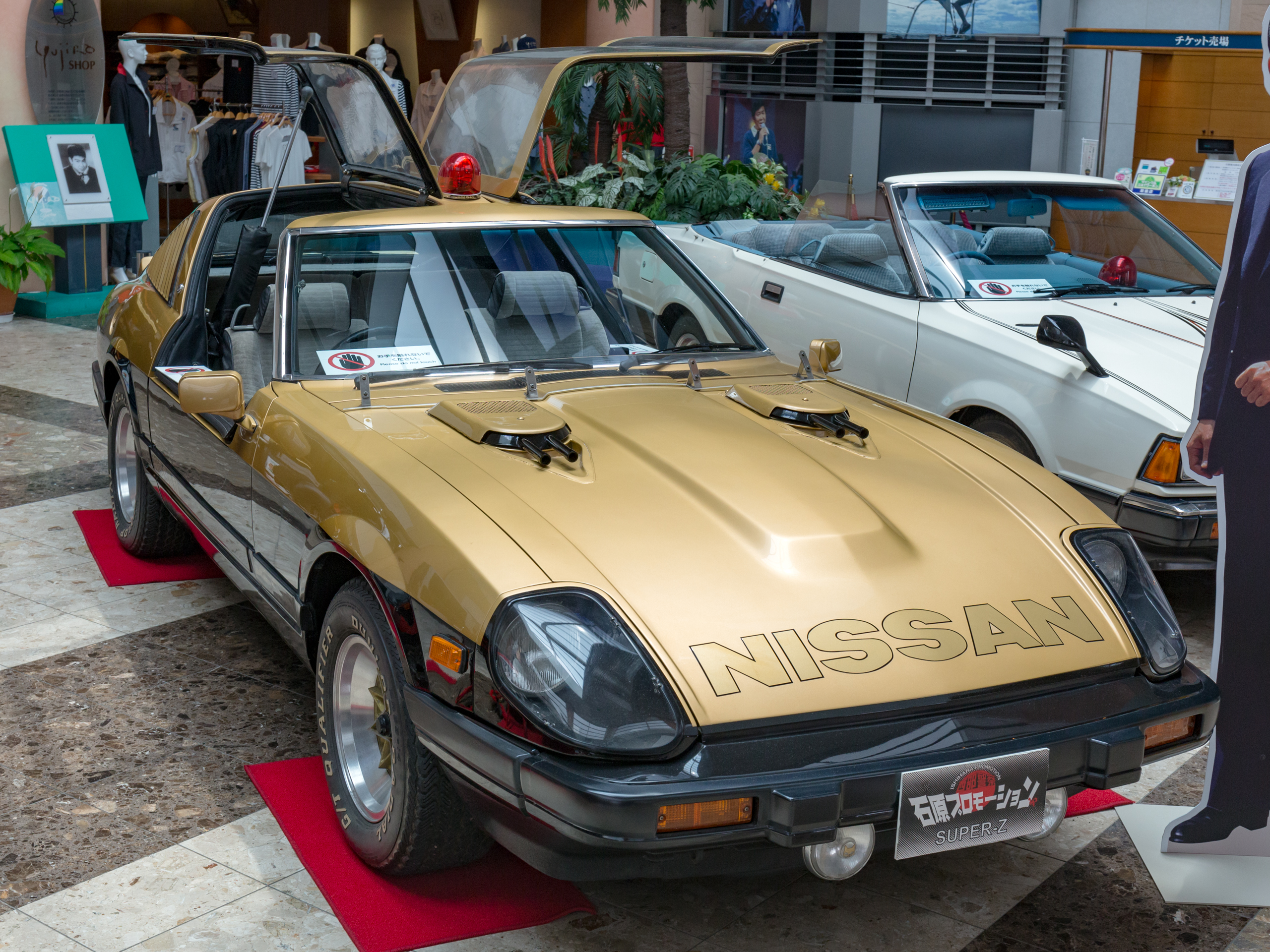
Daimon's Super Z, a modified Nissan Fairlady Z (S130) / 280ZX

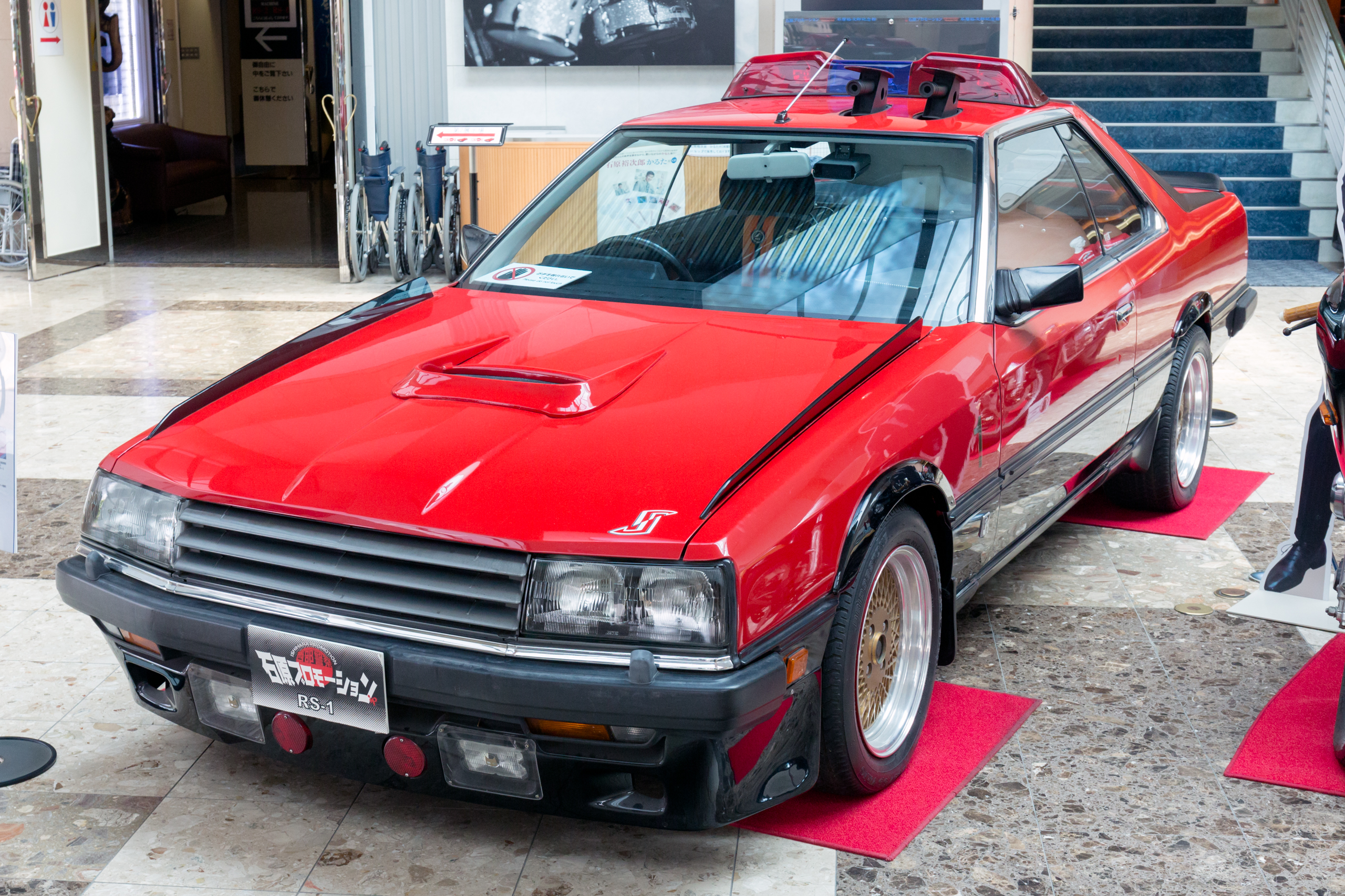
Machine RS-1, a modified Nissan Skyline (R30) 2000 Turbo RS

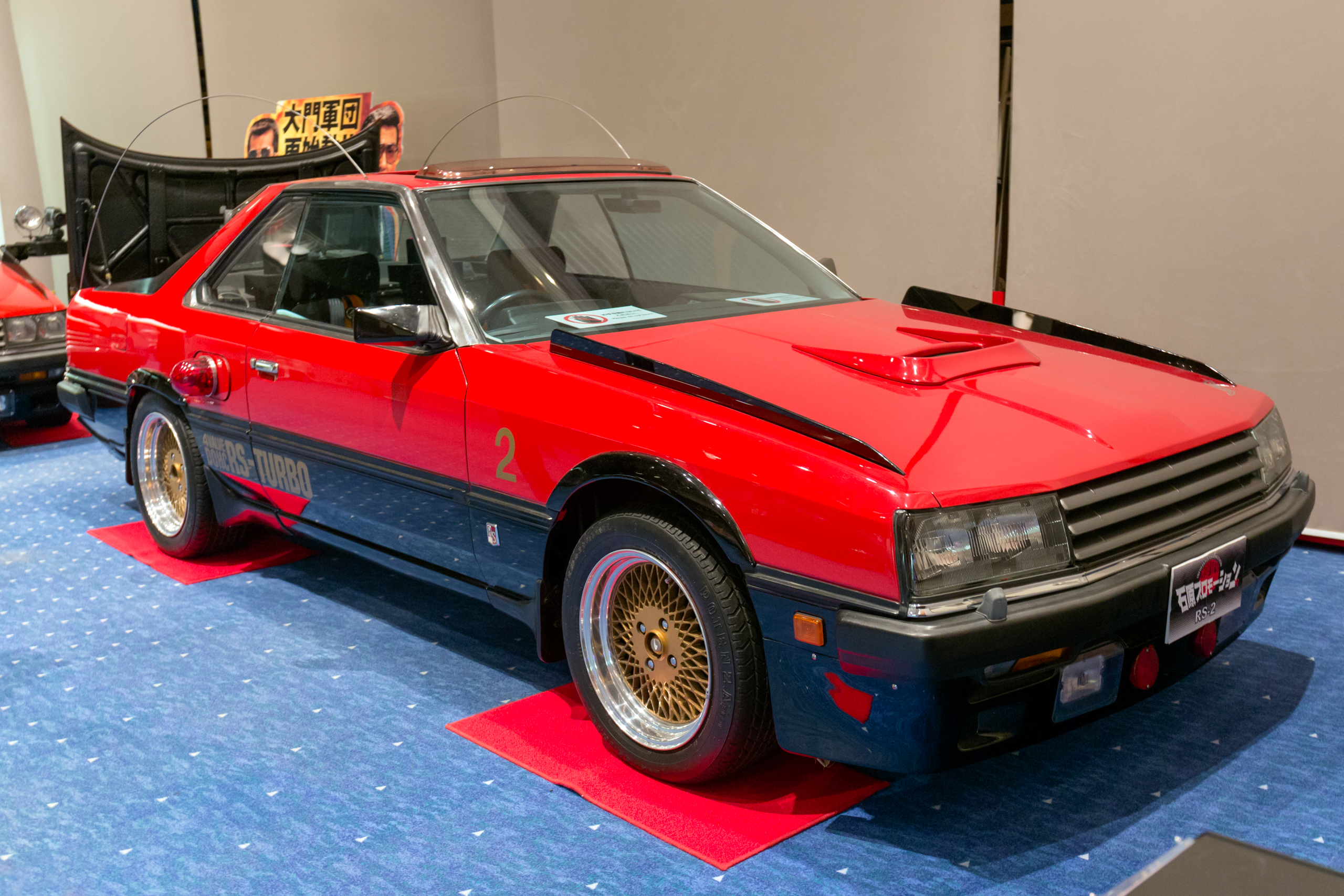
Machine RS-2, a modified Nissan Skyline (R30) 2000 Turbo RS

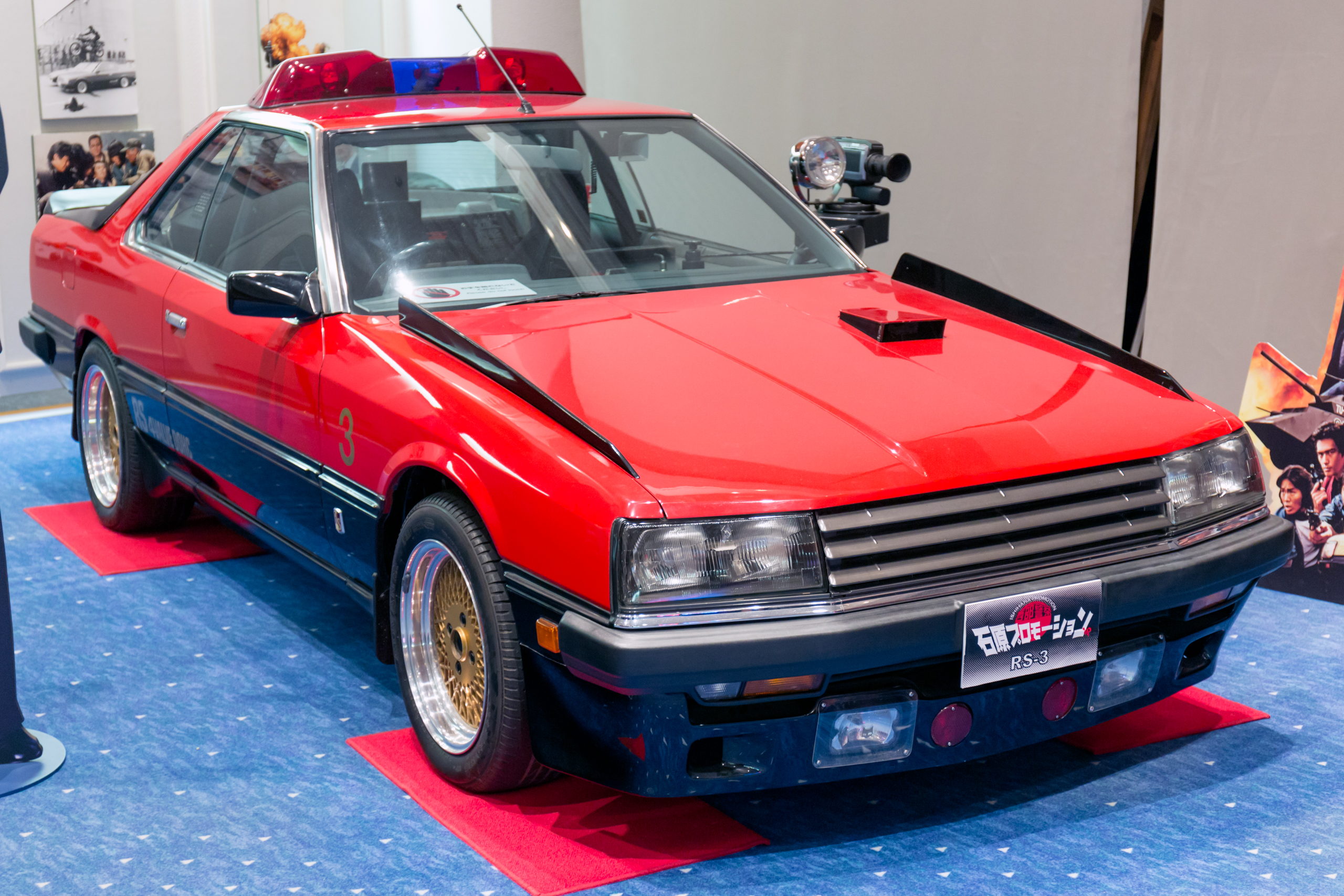
Machine RS-3, a modified Nissan Skyline (R30) 2000 RS

Hatomura's motorcycles

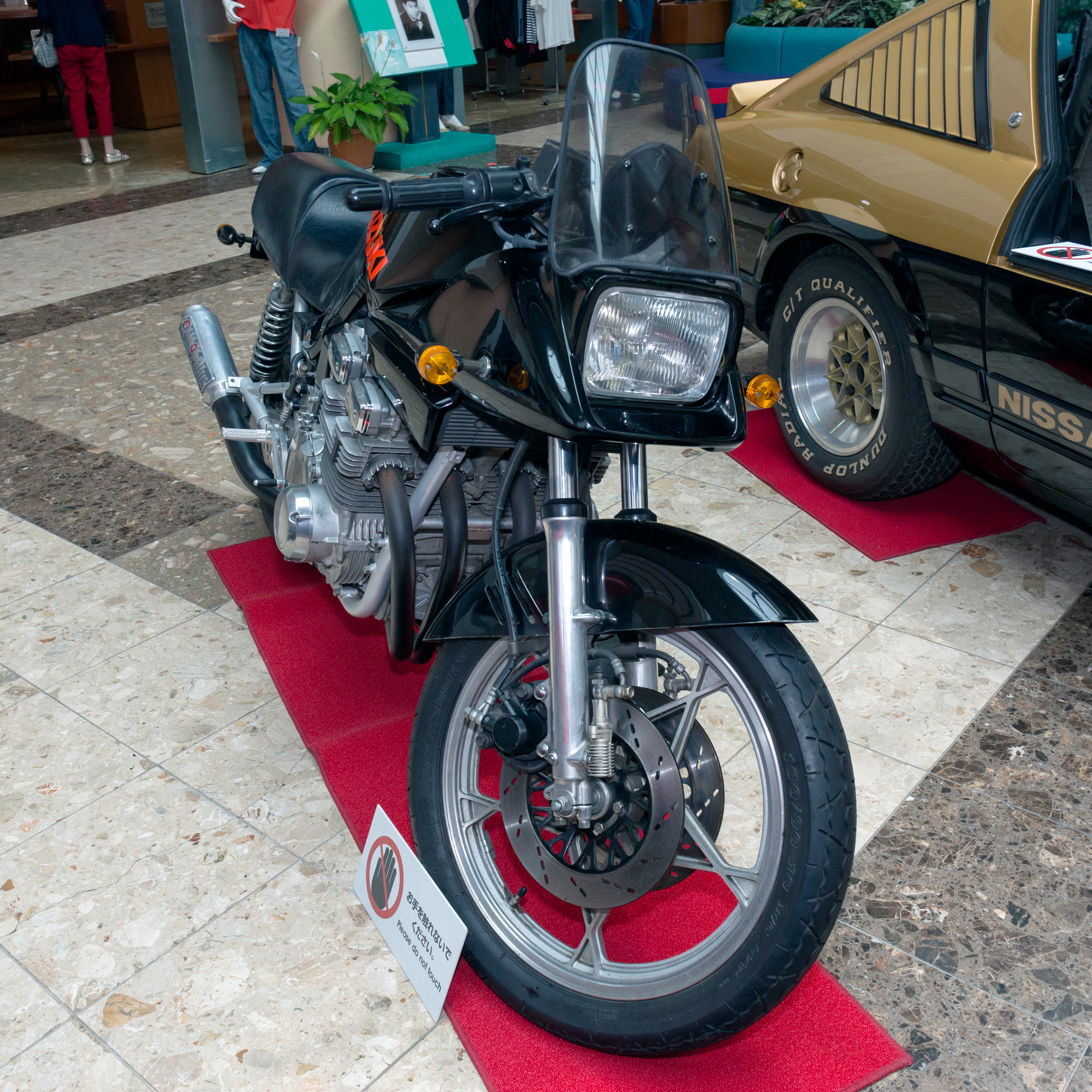
Black Katana, a modified Suzuki GSX-1000S Katana

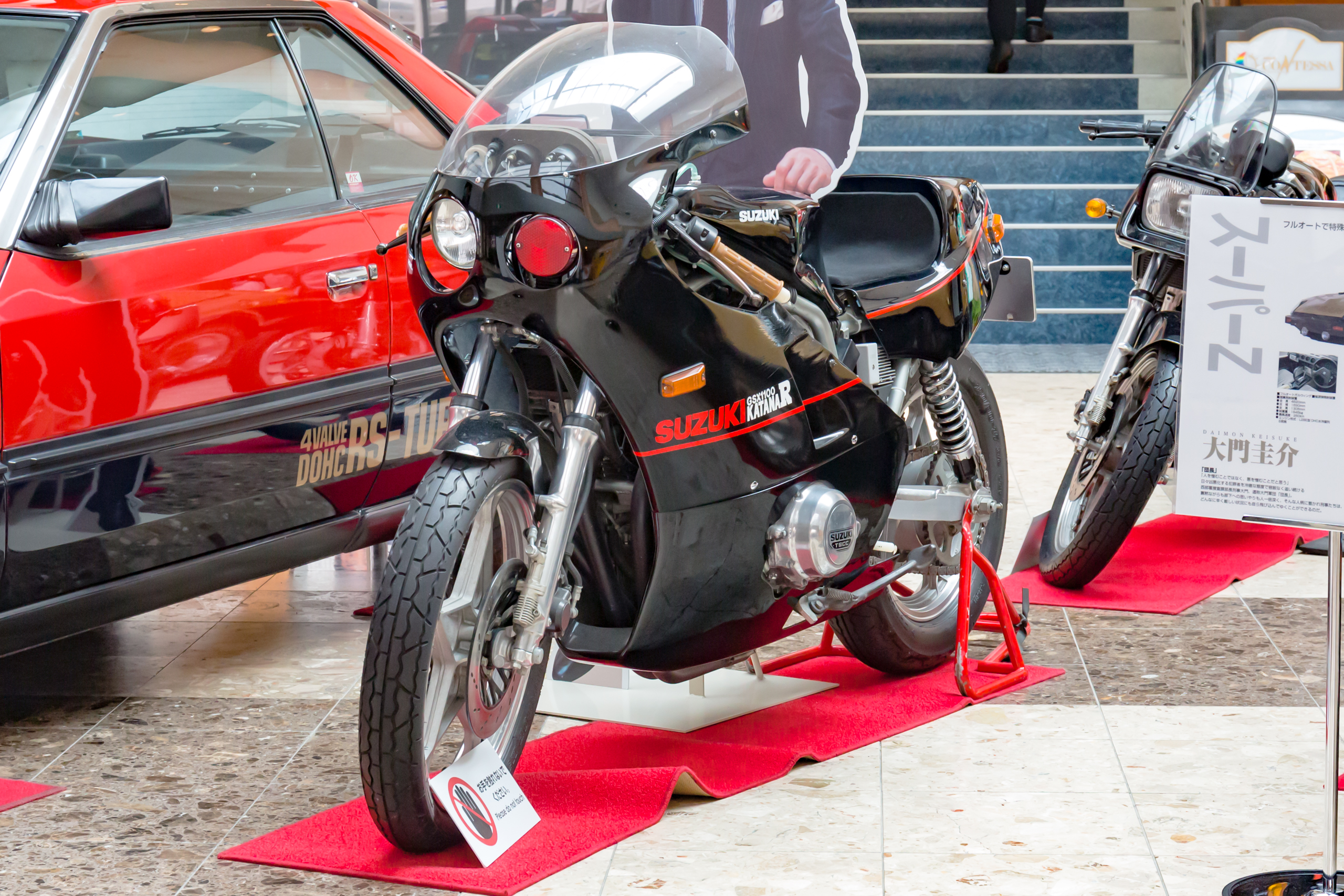
Katana-R, a café racer-modified GSX-1000S Katana

=== Antagonists ===
The series' antagonists used a wide variety of vehicles, some of the most notable including:

- a massive armored car, the TU-89 355 Ladybird used in episode 1 and 2 of Part I by a hired right-wing mercenary and his henchmen aiming for a national coup d'etat and revenge against Daimon
- an illegally-modified Mercury Cougar used by bank robbers in episode 45 of Part I
- a stolen Ford Torino, used in episode 47 of Part I
- a hijacked Hiroshima Electric Railway 750 tram in episode 18 of Part II
- a Hamana Lake pleasure boat used in episode 11 of Part II by gold smugglers
- an Isuzu Elf in episode 26 of Part II
- a disguised Nissan Cedric van used by jewel smugglers in Episode 39
- a fishing boat used in episode 19 of Part III by weapons smugglers
- a fake Super Z used by a rival of Daimon's in episode 14 of Part III
- a train carrying the MX-83, a tactical ballistic missile used in episode 23 of Part III with the specific use of destroying a ship carrying exiled African politicians
- a tanker truck made by Hino Motors in episode 30 of Part III
- a hijacked Nissan Diesel tour bus used in episode 39 of Part III

== See also ==
- Daitokai Series (1976–79) similar detective drama on NTV.
