= List of Japanese films of 1970 =

A list of films released in Japan in 1970 (see 1970 in film).

Title	Director	Cast	Genre	Notes
The All-Out Game	Akira Okazaki	Kimisaburo Onogawa, Saburo Shindo, Kei Wakakura	—	
Alleycat Rock: Female Boss	Yasuharu Hasebe	Meiko Kaji, Akiko Wada, Kōji Wada	—	
The Ambitious	Daisuke Ito	Kinnosuke Nakaura, Toshiro Mifune, Keiju Kobayashi	—	
Atakku No. 1	Eiji Okabe, Fumio Kurokawa	—	—	Animated feature
Atakku No. 1 - Namida no kaiten resibu	Eiji Okabe, Fumio Kurokawa	—	—	Animated feature
Atakku No. 1 - Namida no sekai senshuken	Masaaki Okuma	—	—	Animated feature
Batsugun joshi kousei-16 sai wa kanjichau	Takeshi Matsumori	Yoko Naito, Kyoko Yoshizawa, Toshio Kurosawa	Melodrama	
Batsugun joshikousei-Sotto shitoite 16 sai	Takeshi Matsumori	Kyoko Yoshizawa, Toshio Kurosawa, Yosuke Natsuki	Comedy	
Blind Woman's Curse	Teruo Ishii	Meiko Kaji, Hoki Tokuda, Makoto Satō	Crime	
City of Beasts	Jun Fukuda	Toshio Kurosawa, Rentarō Mikuni, Noriko Takahashi	—	
The Creature Called Man	Kiyoshi Nishimura	Yūzō Kayama, Jiro Tamiya, Mariko Kaga	—	
Crimson Bat - Oichi: Wanted, Dead or Alive	Hirokazu Ichimura	Yoko Matsuyama, Yuki Meguro, Shinji Hotta	—	
Cruel Female Love Suicide	Shōgorō Nishimura	Annu Mari, Sanae Ohori, Jirō Okazaki	—	
Dodes'ka-den	Akira Kurosawa	Yoshitaka Zushi, Kin Sugai, Kazuo Kato	Drama	
Duel at Ezo	Kengo Furusawa	Yūzō Kayama, Rentarō Mikuni, Mitsuko Baisho	—	
Five Gents Fly to Taiwan	Shue Matsubayashi	Hisaya Morishige, Daisuke Katō, Hiroshi Sekiguchi	—	
Five Gents and a Kuniang	Shue Matsubayashi	Hisaya Morishige, Keiju Kobayashi, Daisuke Katō	—	
Forbidden Affair	Masanobu Deme	Shima Iwashita, Shiro Mifune, Takashi Kanda	—	
Gamera vs. Jiger	Noriaki Yuasa	Tsutomu Takakuwa, Kelly Varis, Katherine Murphy	Action, science fiction	
Gakuensai no yoru-Amai keikun	Hiromichi Horikawa	Keiko Torii, Naoki Tachibana, Yoshiro Uchida	Drama	
Get Your Sky! Young Guy!	Tsugunobu Kotani	Yūzō Kayama, Wakako Sakai, Kunie Tanaka	Musical romance	
Hira hira shain-Yuhi-kun	Katsushin Ishida	Osami Nabe, Toshio Kurosawa, Mie Hama	Comedy	
Hira hira shain-Yuhi-kun-Garu hanto no maki	Katsushin Ishida	Osami Nabe, Yuki Shirono, Tonpei Hidari	—	
History of Postwar Japan as Told by a Bar Hostess	Shohei Imamura	Emiko Akaza, Etusko Akaza, Chieko Akaza	Documentary	
Kigeki dokkiri daitoso	Katsumi Iwauchi	Masaaki Sakai, Noriyuki Inoue, Bunjaku Han	Comedy	
Kigeki ganbare! Nihon danji	Katsushin Ishida	Takuya Fujioka, Shoichi Ozawa, Yumi Shirakawa	Comedy	
Kigeki makete tamakura	Takashi Tsuboshima	Kei Tani, Mie Hama, Hideo Sunazuka	Comedy	
Kigeki migimuke hidari!	Yoichi Maeda	Masaaki Sakai, Noriyuki Inoue, The Tigers	Comedy	
Kigeki otoko urimasu	Kiyoshi Nishimura	Takuya Fujioka, Mitsuko Kusabue, Sanae Nakahara	Comedy	
Konchyu monogatari-Minashigo Hattchi	Ippei Kuri	—	—	Animated short
Kureejii no nagurikomi shimizu minato	Takashi Tsuboshima	Hitoshi Ueki, Kei Tani, Hajime Hana	—	
Kyojin no Hoshi-Dairigu boru	Tadao Nagahama	—	—	Animated feature
Kyojin no Hoshi-Shuku mei no taiketsu	Tadao Nagasawa	—	—	Animated feature
Live Today, Die Tomorrow!	Kaneto Shindo	Daijiro Harada, Nobuko Otowa, Kiwako Taichi	—	
Love's Great Risk	Susumu Hani	Pinky and Killers, Shigeru Oya, Naomi Sagara	Musical comedy	
Machibuse	Hiroshi Inagaki	Toshiro Mifune, Shintaro Katsu, Kinnosuke Nakamura	—	
The Militarists	Hiromichi Horikawa	Keiju Kobayashi, Yūzō Kayama, Toshiro Mifune	—	
Minikui ahiro no ko	Kazuhiko Watanabe	—	—	Puppet animated short film
Nippon ichi no no warunori otoko	Takashi Tsuboshima	Hitoshi Ueki, Cha Kato, Kei Tani	—	
Nippon ichi no yakuza otoko	Kengo Furusawa	Hitoshi Ueki, Yoko Tsukasa, Yukiko Kobayashi	Comedy	
Odd Affinity	Kaneto Shindo	Nobuko Otowa, Kiwako Taichi, Jiro Omaru	—	
Oiroke dochu-Kimyo na Nakama	Susumu Kodama	Yosuke Natsuki, Yoichi Hayashi, Reiko Dan	Comedy	
Oiroke konikku-Fushigina nakama	Susumu Kodama	Yosuke Natsuki, Yoichi Hayashi, Judy Ong	Comedy	
Rebel Against Glory	Ko Nakahira	Toshio Kurosawa, Chieko Matsubara, Kunie Tanaka	Action	
Sain wa V	Susumu Takebayashi	Kaai Okada, Jin Nakayama, Mari Nakayama	Melodrama	
Santa Claus Is Comin' to Town	Arthur Rankin Jr., Jules Bass	Fred Astaire, Mickey Rooney, Keenan Wynn, Paul Frees, Joan Gardner, Robie Lester	Christmas	
The Scandalous Adventures of Buraikan	Masahiro Shinoda	Tatsuya Nakadai, Shima Iwashita, Shōichi Ozawa	—	
Sex Jack	Kōji Wakamatsu	Michio Akiyama, Mizako Kaga, Tamaki Katori		
Sore ga otoko no ikiru michi	Jun Fukuda	Makoto Fujita, Takuya Fujioka, Chitose Kobayashi	Comedy	
Space Amoeba	Ishirō Honda	Akira Kubo, Atsuko Takahashi, Yukiko Kobayashi	—	
Stray Cat Rock: Sex Hunter	Yasuharu Hasebe	Meiko Kaji, Rikiya Yasuoka, Tatsuya Fuji	Crime	
Stray Cat Rock: Wild Jumbo	Toshiya Fujita	Meiko Kaji, Bunjaku Han, Takeo Chii	—	
Take Care, Little Red Riding Hood	Shiro Moritani	Yusuke Okada, Kazuyo Mori, Tetsuo Tomigawa	Drama	Puppet animated short film
Terror in the Streets	Michio Yamamoto	Wakako Sakai, Katsutoshi Arata, Kenji Imai	Horror	
Tora! Tora! Tora!	Richard Fleischer, Toshio Masuda, Kinji Fukasaku	Martin Balsam, Jason Robards, Sō Yamamura	War	Japanese-American co-production
Tora-san, His Tender Love	Azuma Morisaki	Kiyoshi Atsumi, Michiyo Aratama, Shin Morikawa	—	
Tora-san's Grand Scheme	Shun'ichi Kobayashi	Kiyoshi Atsumi, Chieko Baisho, Komaki Kurihara	—	
Tora-san's Runaway	Yoji Yamada	Kiyoshi Atsumi, Chieko Baisho, Aiko Nagayama	—	
Two Halves	Yukio Aoshima	Yukio Aoshima, Chinatsu Nakayama, Jiro Sakagami	Comedy	
The Vampire Doll	Michio Yamamoto	Kayo Matsuo, Yukiko Kobayashi	Horror	
Where Spring Comes Late	Yoji Yamada	Chieko Baisho, Hisashi Igawa, Chishū Ryū	—	
Will to Conquer	Seiji Maruayama	Kinnosuke Yorozuya, Yoshiko Sakuma, Tatsuya Nakadai	—	
Women Smell of Night	Takashi Nomura	Akira Kobayashi, Ryohei Uchida, Noriko Maki	—	
Yasashii raion	Takashi Yanase	—	—	Animated short
Yawara no hoshi	Tatsuo Yamada	Kenichi Sakuragi, Yukiko Kimura, Yoko Hayama	Melodrama	
Zatoichi at the Fire Festival	Kenji Misumi	Shintaro Katsu, Tatsuya Nakadai, Reiko Ohara	—	
Zatoichi Meets Yojimbo	Kihachi Okamoto	Shintaro Katsu, Toshiro Mifune, Shin Kishida	Action, adventure	
Zeni Geba	Yoshinori Wada	KaraJuro, Kenbo Kaminarimon, Takeshi Katō	—	

== See also ==
- 1970 in Japan
- 1970 in Japanese television
