= Lady Snowblood =

Lady Snowblood may refer to:

- Lady Snowblood (manga), 1972–1973 serialized manga
- Lady Snowblood (film), 1973 film adaptation of the manga
  - Lady Snowblood: Love Song of Vengeance, the 1974 sequel to the film
