= Broken Oath =

1977 Hong Kong film by Jeong Chang-hwa

- Broken Oath DVD cover
- Traditional Chinese: 破戒
- Hanyu Pinyin: Po jie
- Directed by: Jeong Chang-hwa
- Written by: Jeong Chang-hwa
- Based on: Lady Snowblood by; Norio Osada; Toshiya Fujita; Lady Snowblood by; Kazuo Koike; Kazuo Kamimura
- Produced by: Raymond Chow
- Starring: Angela Mao; Chan Wai-Man; Dean Shek; Sammo Hung
- Cinematography: Wang Yung-lung
- Edited by: Peter Cheung
- Music by: Joseph Koo
- Distributed by: Golden Harvest
- Release date: 3 December 1977 (Hong Kong)
- Running time: 98 minutes
- Country: Hong Kong
- Language: Mandarin

Broken Oath (Chinese: 破戒; pinyin: Po jie) is a 1977 Hong Kong Mandarin-language kung fu film directed by Jeong Chang-hwa, a South Korean director. The film was produced by Golden Harvest. It is an unofficial remake of the 1973 film Lady Snowblood, itself an adaptation of the manga series of the same name by Kazuo Koike and Kazuo Kamimura.

== Plot ==
A woman lies dying in a women's prison after giving birth and recounts to a pickpocket how she ended up there after her husband was murdered by thugs, one of whom also raped her. The pickpocket agrees to raise her daughter to seek revenge, but in hopes of breaking the cycle of violence she hands the infant girl over to a Shaolin monastery for women. 'Pure Lotus' Liu (Angela Mao) grows up to be a troubled young woman who skips out on Buddhist lessons, but excels at kung fu. She's kicked out after killing several thugs and rejoins the pickpocket, where she discovers the truth about her parents. Using her kung fu and deadly scorpions, Lotus begins a systematic hunt for each of the men who assaulted her family and ends up joining forces with government agents to uproot rebels, two of whom are her targets.

== Cast ==
This is a partial list of cast.

- Angela Mao as Liu Chieh Lien, Lotus.
- Michael Chan as Zhao Cai, Chao Tsai.
- Bruce Leung as Chen Bang, Chang Pang.
- Kuo Cheng-Yu as Imperial undercover agent
- Guan Shan as Liu Da Xiong, General Liu.
- Chao Hsiung as Hao Shi, Hao Chi.
- Fong Yau as Dou Qi, To Chi.
- Chang Pei-Shan as Chou Kui, General Tiu
- Ha Yue as Ah Shu
- Tony Lou Chun-Ku as Chou's assistant
- Sze-Ma Wah-Lung as Mr Wong
- Wang Lai as Thousand Hands
- Lee Wan-Chung as Hao's assistant
- Dean Shek as Brothel manager
- Ho Mei as Mrs Liu Yee Mei
- Sammo Hung as Starknife bodyguard
- Han Ying-chieh as Fire-breathing bodyguard
- Yeung Wai as Imperial undercover agent
- Yuen Wah as One of Hao's men/One of Chou's guards
- San Kuai as One of Hao's men
- Wong Mei as One of Hao's men
- Corey Yuen as One of Chou's guards / Hao's bodyguard
- Mars as One of Chou's guards
- Yuen Biao as One of Qi's men
- Alan Chui Chung-San as One of Qi's men
- Alan Chan Kwok-Kuen as One of Qi's men
- Chin Yuet-Sang as One of Chou's guards
- Hsu Hsia as One of Qi's men
- Chin Chun as Guard leader
- Lee Hang as One of Hao's men
- Chu Yau-Ko as Hungry man at inn

== See also ==
- Lady Snowblood
