= Naked Seven =

- Theatrical poster for Naked Seven (1972)
- Directed by: Yasuharu Hasebe
- Written by: Atsushi Yamatoya; Yasuharu Hasebe
- Starring: Mari Tanaka
- Cinematography: Masaru Mori
- Edited by: Akira Suzuki
- Music by: Hajime Kaburagi
- Distributed by: Nikkatsu
- Release date: December 27, 1972
- Running time: 80 min.
- Country: Japan
- Language: Japanese

Naked Seven (戦国ロック 疾風の女たち, Sengoku rokku nayate no onnatachi) aka Sengoku Rock: Female Warriors and Warring States Rock: Gale-Force Women is a 1972 Japanese film in Nikkatsu's Roman porno series, directed by Yasuharu Hasebe and starring Mari Tanaka.

== Synopsis ==
A gang consisting of seven women roams around the country to steal and resell everything that makes money. When the gang leader falls in love with a samurai and agrees to steal guns for him, he betrays her and soon the women are chased by many enemies.

== Cast ==
- Mari Tanaka: Wan
- Keiko Tsuzuki: Shino
- Yuri Yamashina: Nene
- Shō Munakata: Yayoi
- Setsuko Ōyama: Sakura
- Sayori Shima: Suzume: Suzume
- Keiko Aikawa: Ume
- Kenji Kaji: Tarō Tenma
- Hyōe Enoki: Jizō Rokkaku
- Genjirō Arato: Nojirō Nitta
- Hiroshi Gojō: Saburō of Santo
- Machiyo Mako: 於寧
- Genshū Hanayagi: Mother of Yayoi

== Background ==
The screenplay to Naked Seven was written by the cult film director Atsushi Yamatoya, who had helped write the screenplay to Seijun Suzuki's cult classic Branded to Kill (1967). Yamatoya is best known for his own noir crime-thriller-cum pink film Inflatable Sex Doll of the Wastelands (1967). The plot of Naked Seven is an obvious take-off on Akira Kurosawa's Seven Samurai (1954), which it satirizes. American arthouse audiences could appreciate the parody of Kurosawa, but to Japanese audiences the film also served as a reference to director Yasuharu Hasebe's own popular Alleycat Rock series (1970–71) from the pre-Roman Porno era. This series featured actress Meiko Kaji in stories about a female motorcycle gang.

Having been a director at Nikkatsu since before the Roman Porno days, Hasebe was uncomfortable with the pink film genre, and mixed his first two Roman Pornos with other genres to create interest. Besides the historical-adventure style of Naked Seven, he departed from standard pink style with his next film, Sukeban Deka: Dirty Mary (1974), a tribute to the Dirty Harry films. Naked Seven was successful at the time of its release, and, in their Japanese Cinema Encyclopedia: The Sex Films (1998), the Weissers give the film three points out of four. Because Naked Seven and Dirty Mary, Hasebe's first two films in the Roman Porno series, had both departed from standard pink themes, Hasebe did not consider them to be Pink Films. After departing Nikkatsu for television, he returned to the studio to direct controversial rape-themed films in the "Violent Pink" genre. Hasebe considered the first of these films, Rape! (1976), to be his first true sex film. Through the "violent pink" genre, Hasebe had the creative freedom from the strict sex formula, and created such controversial films as Assault! Jack the Ripper (1976) and Rape! 13th Hour (1977). Though Hasebe's films in this genre are generally considered his best work, they remain controversial.

Naked Seven was a showcase for Nikkatsu's top starlets of the time. Mari Tanaka, as leader of the gang, had made news headlines through her association with the controversial and persecuted Love Hunter (1972) and its sequel, and was an idol of the anti-establishment. Genshū Hanayagi was a classical ballerina who came to Nikkatsu's attention through appearance in a television commercial. Her major role in director Noboru Tanaka's later Nikkatsu Roman Porno Secret Chronicles: She-Beast Market (1974) created news in Japan.

== Availability ==
Naked Seven was released theatrically in Japan on December 27, 1972, and played in U.S. arthouse theaters in the 1970s. It was released on DVD in Japan on December 21, 2007, as part of Geneon's tenth wave of Nikkatsu Roman porno series.

== Bibliography ==
=== English ===
- "SENGOKU ROKKU HAYATE NO ONNATACHI". Complete Index to World Film.
- Sengoku rokku hayate no onnatachi (1974) at IMDb
- Sharp, Jasper (2008). Behind the Pink Curtain: The Complete History of Japanese Sex Cinema. Guildford: FAB Press. ISBN 978-1-903254-54-7.
- Weisser, Thomas; Yuko Mihara Weisser (1998). Japanese Cinema Encyclopedia: The Sex Films. Miami: Vital Books : Asian Cult Cinema Publications. ISBN 1-889288-52-7.

=== Japanese ===
- 戦国ロック 疾風の女たち(1972) (in Japanese). allcinema.net.
- 戦国ロック 疾風の女たち (in Japanese). Japanese Cinema Database (Agency for Cultural Affairs). Archived from the original on 2011-10-08.
- 戦国ロック 疾風の女たち (in Japanese). Japanese Movie Database.
- 戦国ロック 疾風の女たち(邦画) (in Japanese). Kinema Junpo. Archived from the original on 2011-10-07.
