= Attacked!! =

1978 film

- Theatrical poster
- Directed by: Yasuharu Hasebe
- Written by: Hideichi Nagahara
- Starring: Asami Ogawa; Yōko Azusa
- Cinematography: Shōhei Andō
- Edited by: Osamu Inoue
- Distributed by: Nikkatsu
- Release date: February 4, 1978
- Running time: 72 minutes
- Country: Japan
- Language: Japanese

Attacked!! (襲う！！, Osō!!), also known as Attack!!, is a 1978 Japanese film in the "violent pink" style of Nikkatsu's Roman Porno series, directed by Yasuharu Hasebe and starring Asami Ogawa and Yōko Azusa.

== Synopsis ==
A policewoman is attacked, handcuffed and raped while on night patrol. Rather than report the incident, she determines to find and punish the rapist herself. After the same attacker again rapes her in the police restroom, she becomes terrified of another encounter, and develops a victim mentality. The criminal is neither caught nor identified at the end of the film, leaving the policewoman's feelings of terror and desire for vengeance unresolved.

== Cast ==
- Asami Ogawa (小川亜佐美) as Kumiko Kawai
- Yōko Azusa (梓ようこ) as Eiko Yano
- Shigeru Ichiki (市来秀) as Tamura
- Kai Abe (阿藤海) as Ōkubo
- Atsushi Takahashi (高橋淳) as Ejima
- Kunio Shimizu (清水国雄) as Shingo Kanai
- Yuri Risa (梨沙ゆり) as Mayumi
- Noboru Migaki (磨のぼる) as Male gangster A
- Toshikatsu Matsukaze (松風敏勝) as Male gangster B
- Tomoko Sakurai (桜井とも子) as Female gangster A
- Fumie Akira (章文栄) as Fembale gangster B
- Jun Todoki (十時じゅん) as Yasugi's wife

== Critical appraisal ==
The film's ending, in which the attacker's identity remains a mystery, has generated the most polarizing comment from critics. Some consider this a suspenseful, unusual plot strategy, while others dismiss it as teasing the audience. In their Japanese Cinema Encyclopedia: The Sex Films, the Weissers write, "the unsettling nature of this denouement generates considerably more tension than the standard thriller, as the viewer can't shake the feeling that the story hasn't ended at all. The fear continues long after the credits insist it's The End".

The Weissers judge Attacked!! to be a step back in the brutality Hasebe portrayed in his "offensively appalling" Rape! 13th Hour (1977), writing, "The film is still deplorable, but not nearly as repulsive as the former notorious entry". Allmovie also notes that this film is less extreme than Rape! 13th Hour, but that Hasebe nevertheless creates tension through the suspenseful plot. Of the attacker never being revealed, Allmovie comments, "The ending feels a bit like a cheat to those viewers attempting to guess the rapist's identity, but the film holds together as a solid thriller nonetheless".

== Release ==
Attacked!! was released theatrically in Japan on February 4, 1978.

== Home media ==
It was released on DVD in Japan on March 24, 2006, as part of Geneon's third wave of Nikkatsu Roman Porno series.

== Bibliography ==
=== English ===
- "OSOU!". Complete Index to World Film.
- Osou! (1978) at IMDb
- Sharp, Jasper (2008). Behind the Pink Curtain: The Complete History of Japanese Sex Cinema. Guildford: FAB Press. pp. 229, 344. ISBN 978-1-903254-54-7.
- Weisser, Thomas; Yuko Mihara Weisser (1998). Japanese Cinema Encyclopedia: The Sex Films. Miami: Vital Books : Asian Cult Cinema Publications. pp. 53–54. ISBN 1-889288-52-7.

=== Japanese ===
- 襲う！(1978) (in Japanese). allcinema.net.
- 襲う！！ (in Japanese). Japanese Cinema Database (Agency for Cultural Affairs). Archived from the original on 2012-03-11.
- 襲う！！ (in Japanese). Japanese Movie Database.
- 襲う！！(邦画 ) (in Japanese). Kinema Junpo. Archived from the original on 2012-03-24.
