= Yasuharu Hasebe =

Japanese film director

- Yasuharu Hasebe during his 1999 interview with Asian Cult Cinema
- Born: April 4, 1932; Tokyo, Japan
- Died: June 14, 2009 (aged 77); Kawasaki, Kanagawa Prefecture, Japan
- Occupation: Film director
- Years active: 1966–2008

Yasuharu Hasebe (長谷部安春, Hasebe Yasuharu; April 4, 1932 – June 14, 2009) was a Japanese film director best known for his movies in the "Violent pink" subgenre of the Pink film, such as Assault! Jack the Ripper (1976), Rape! (1976), Rape! 13th Hour (1977) and Raping! (1978). Earlier genre films directed by Hasebe include Black Tight Killers (1966) and the Alleycat Rock series (1970).

== Life and career ==
=== Early life ===
Hasebe recalled a trusting relationship with his father, whom he considered the biggest influence on his life. In the post-war years, Hasebe was influenced strongly by American and French films, particularly American "B" movies, and the films of John Huston and Samuel Fuller. After studying French literature at Waseda University, he began working at Nikkatsu studios in 1958. For eight years he worked as an assistant director, including a lengthy apprenticeship under Seijun Suzuki. He was given his first chance to direct in 1966 with Black Tight Killers. He directed more action genre films in the 1960s including the fourth film in the Singing Gunman series, starring Akira Kobayashi, and Massacre Gun with Jo Shishido.

=== Alleycat Rock ===
In 1970, Nikkatsu wanted to create a youth-oriented series and chose Hasebe to supervise the first film in what would be the popular Alleycat Rock series. The studio gave him considerable freedom in the direction of the first film, Alleycat Rock: Female Boss (1970), and, under the pseudonym "Takashi Fujii", Hasebe co-wrote the story as well. Meiko Kaji was the supporting actress in the first entry in the series, but became the star of the remaining films. Though mainly known for his later "violent pink" films, some call this series Hasebe's best work, "ultra-chic, yet surprisingly grim."

The Alleycat Rock series came to an end when Kaji left Nikkatsu to join Toei studios and star in the Female Prisoner: Scorpion series and Lady Snowblood (1973). Hasebe also left Nikkatsu in late 1971, when the studio decided to compete with the Pink film genre, and produce almost nothing but softcore pornographic films which Nikkatsu labeled "Roman Porno". Hasebe later commented, "to be honest, I am not good at making sex films."

Hasebe worked mainly in television in the early 1970s, including the series Spectreman. He returned to Nikkatsu to make Naked Seven (1974), a financially and critically successful parody of Kurosawa's Seven Samurai, and an informal sequel to the Alleycat Rock series. Also in 1974, he directed an homage to Clint Eastwood's Dirty Harry character in Sukeban Deka: Dirty Mary. Though well-regarded today, this film was a major financial failure at the time, and damaged Hasebe's reputation for a couple of years.

=== "Violent pink" ===
When Nikkatsu offered him a chance to leave TV and create a new genre of pink film in 1976, Hasebe was at first reluctant. Not interested in directing typical sex films, Hasebe instead conceived of the "Violent pink" genre. The Weissers, in their Japanese Cinema Encyclopedia: The Sex Films describe the Violent pink" films as "vicious and mean-spirited productions, without delving into the more traditional whip-n-bondage aspects of the S&M genre", and compare the genre to the American "roughies." Warning the studio about his intentions, Hasebe asked "Are you sure you want me? You must be aware--my craft is very bloody." Nikkatsu, desperate at the time for a new direction for their Roman porno films, agreed to give him creative freedom. Though "highly controversial and recommended with some obvious reservations", most critics judge Hasebe's "violent pink" films the best of his career.

Hasebe's first true Roman porno, the "violent pink" Rape! (1976) became a hit, and Nikkatsu let him continue making similar films. Hasebe recalled, "In '76, I made three genre films back to back, Rape!, Assault! Jack The Ripper and Rape! 13th Hour. I'm not sure these were great films, but the ticket sales were remarkable. It was wonderful to be a busy, successful director again."

The last of these three films has been called, "the pinnacle of this genre, a movie long-considered the most offensive, the most grotesque movie of all time." Nikkatsu, fearful of governmental action if Hasebe continued becoming more extreme in his films, assigned producer Ryoji Ito to watch him on the set. Recalling this situation later, Hasebe laughed and said, "Rape! 13th Hour... remains one of Producer Ito's favorites. Ultimately, I guess the company misjudged our tagteam effect."

Some contemporary critics interpreted these films as commentaries and satires on the state of film-making in Japan at the time. Hasebe denied such intentions on his part, but did not rule out the possibility that producer Ito and the script-writer may have had this in mind. Hasebe rejected the idea that cinematic violence incites violence in the audience, saying, "I believe [film violence] has no effect on an audience. Personally, I can attest to this fact. I do not become aggressive when I watch a violent movie. I can not imagine such a correlation... When I was very young, we admired Humphrey Bogart for his dandyism, but not for his killing. We did not accept the formula. We knew that killing somebody wouldn't make us become him. Why? Because we knew it was just a goddamn movie and he was just an actor and none of his victims were really dead."

Though the controversial Rape! 13th Hour had been a box-office hit, Nikkatsu decided to curtail the ultra-violence in their Roman porno films after its release. Kōyū Ohara's Zoom Up: Rape Site (1980) would later begin another wave of "Violent pink" Nikkatsu Roman porno films. Hasebe softened his touch for his next film, Secret Honeymoon: Rape Train (1977), which was more typical of Nikkatsu's Roman porno style, and called an "erotic film emphasizing warmth and human drama." His next film, Attacked!! (1978), compared to Rape! 13th Hour, has been judged "still deplorable, but not nearly as repulsive as the former notorious entry." Also in 1978, Hasebe directed Erotic Liaisons, a modern adaptation of Choderlos de Laclos's 18th-century epistolary novel Les Liaisons dangereuses, which pink film director, Kōji Wakamatsu would also film in 1992.

After leaving Nikkatsu in the late 1970s, Hasebe worked for Toei, where he directed several V-cinema films in the 1990s. When interviewed in 1999, Hasebe was a grandfather, living in comfortable semi-retirement in Tokyo. Hasebe died of pneumonia on June 14, 2009.

== Filmography ==
=== Films ===
Title	Studio	Release date
Black Tight Killers 俺にさわると危ないぜ; Ore ni sawaru to abunaize	Nikkatsu	February 12, 1966
The Singing Gunman 爆弾男といわれるあいつ; Bakudan-Otoko to Iwareru Aitsu	Nikkatsu	June 28, 1967
Slaughter Gun みな殺しの拳銃; Minagoroshi no Kenju	Nikkatsu	September 6, 1967
Retaliation 縄張はもらった; Shima wa moratta	Nikkatsu	October 5, 1968
Savage Wolf Pack 野獣を消せ; Yaju o kese	Nikkatsu	February 22, 1969
Roughneck あらくれ; Arakure	Nikkatsu	June 14, 1969
Bloody Territories 広域暴力団 流血の縄張; Kōiki bōryoku: ryūketsu no shima	Nikkatsu	July 2, 1969
A Gangster's Morals 盛り場仁義; Sakariba Jingi	Nikkatsu	January 24, 1970
Alleycat Rock: Female Boss 女番長野良猫ロック; Onna banchō nora-neko rokku	Nikkatsu	May 2, 1970
Tomorrow's Joe あしたのジョー; Ashita no Joe	Nikkatsu	July 22, 1970
Alleycat Rock: Sex Hunter 野良猫ロック セックスハンター; Nora-neko rokku: sekkusu hantaa	Nikkatsu	September 1, 1970
Alleycat Rock: Machine Animal 野良猫ロック マシン・アニマル; Nora-neko rokku: mashin animaru	Nikkatsu	November 22, 1970
A Man′s World 男の世界; Otoko no sekai	Nikkatsu	January 13, 1971
Blood for Blood 渡世人 命の捨て場; Ryuketsu No Koso	Nikkatsu	June 10, 1971
Naked Seven 戦国ロック 疾風の女たち; Sengoku rokku hayate no onnatachi	Nikkatsu	December 27, 1972
Female Convict Scorpion: Grudge Song 女囚さそり ７０１号怨み節; Joshū sasori: 701-gō urami-bushi	Toei	December 29, 1973
Sukeban Deka: Dirty Mary すけばん刑事 ダーティ・マリー; Sukeban deka: daati Marii	Nikkatsu	April 20, 1974
Rape! 犯す！ Okasu!	Nikkatsu	February 7, 1976
Assault! Jack the Ripper 暴行切り裂きジャック; Bōkō Kirisaki Jakku	Nikkatsu	July 7, 1976
Rape! 13th Hour レイプ２５時 暴姦; Rape! 25-ji bokan	Nikkatsu	January 22, 1977
Secret Honeymoon: Rape Train （秘）ハネムーン 暴行列車; Maruhi honeymoon: boko ressha	Nikkatsu	October 15, 1977
Attacked!! 襲う！！ Osō!	Nikkatsu	February 4, 1978
Erotic Liaisons エロチックな関係; Eroticna kankei	Nikkatsu	July 8, 1978
Raping! 暴る！ Yaru!	Nikkatsu	November 18, 1978
The Leather Jack / The Young Animals 皮ジャン反抗族; Kawajyan hankô zoku	Toei	December 2, 1978
Fossilized Wilderness 化石の荒野; Kaseki no kōya	Toei	April 17, 1982
Dangerous Cop あぶない刑事; Abunai Deka	Toei	December 12, 1987
悪人専用	Toei Video	December 14, 1990
傷だらけのライセンス	Toei Video	January 11, 1991
ベイサイド・バイオレンス 群狼	Back In Video	June 28, 1991
ＤＡＮＧＥＲ ＰＯＩＮＴ 地獄への道	Toei Video	October 11, 1991
ろくでなし ＬＡＳＴ ＤＯＷＮ ＴＥＮ	Toei Video	February 12, 1993
ろくでなし２ ＬＡＳＴ ＤＯＷＮ ＴＥＮ	Toei Video	May 21, 1994
Lesson レッスン; Ressun	製作委員会	June 25, 1994
チンピラ仁義 新・極楽とんぼ	Toei Video	November 8, 1996
チンピラ人生 むしむしころころ	Toei Video	February 13, 1998
組織暴力 流血の抗争	Toei Video	January 8, 1999
組織暴力 流血の抗争	Toei Video	March 12, 1999
組織暴力 流血の仁義	Toei Video	March 12, 1999
組織暴力 流血の仁義２	Toei Video	November 12, 1999
Aibo series Kanshiki Yonezawa Mamoru no Jikenbo 相棒シリーズ 鑑識・米沢守の事件簿	Toei	2009

=== Television series ===
- Spectreman (Supekutoruman aka Uchû enjin gori) (1971)
- Tokusō Saizensen (1977)
- Daitsuiseki (1978) (episodes 1, 2, 5, 6)
- Tantei Monogatari (1979) (episodes 8 and 10)
- Pro Hunter (1980) (episodes 2, 4, 11, 12, 21 and 22)
- Abunai Deka (1986)
- Aibō (2000)

== Sources ==
- "長谷部安春 (Hasebe Yasuharu)" (in Japanese). Japanese Movie Database.
- Hasebe, Yasuharu. (1998). Interviewed by Thomas and Yuko Mihara Weisser in Tokyo, 1999, in Asian Cult Cinema, #25, 4th Quarter, 1999, p. 32-42.
- Mes, Tom (August 4, 2004). "Stray Cat Rock: Sex Hunter (DVD review)". Midnight Eye.
- Sharp, Jasper (May 10, 2001). "Black Tight Killers (DVD review)". Midnight Eye.
- Yasuharu Hasebe at IMDb
