= Black Tight Killers =

- Japanese theatrical poster
- Directed by: Yasuharu Hasebe
- Written by: Ryūzō Nakanishi; Michio Tsuzuki
- Starring: Akira Kobayashi; Chieko Matsubara
- Cinematography: Kazue Nagatsuka
- Edited by: Akira Suzuki
- Music by: Naozumi Yamamoto
- Distributed by: Nikkatsu
- Release date: February 12, 1966 (Japan)
- Running time: 86 minutes
- Country: Japan
- Language: Japanese

Black Tight Killers (Japanese: 俺にさわると危ないぜ, Hepburn: Ore ni Sawaru to Abunaize; lit. Touching Me is Dangerous) is a 1966 Japanese film directed by Yasuharu Hasebe and based on the novel 三重露出 by Michio Tsuzuki.

== Synopsis ==
Daisuke Honda, a war photographer in Vietnam, meets Yuriko Sawanouchi, a stewardess on his plane back to Japan. After drinking with her at a Tokyo bar, he becomes involved in saving Yuriko from assassination by female ninjas. When trying to rescue Yuriko from kidnappers, Daisuke discovers a group of foreigners are hunting for a World War II-era treasure hidden on an island by Yuriko's father.

== Cast ==
- Akira Kobayashi as Daisuke Honda
- Chieko Matsubara as Yuriko Sawanouchi
- Mieko Nishio as Fuyuko
- Kozue Kamo as Yoshie
- Tomoko Hamakawa as Natsuko
- Akemi Kita as Akiko
- Archie Hays, Jr. as American Gangster
- Keisuke Noro as Man A
- Shuntarō Tamamura as Man 1

== Release ==
Black Tight Killers was released on February 12, 1966. It was released in the U.S. during this era. It was released in DVD format in Japan in 2005. Image Entertainment released the film on DVD in the United States. This DVD has the burned-in subtitles which were part of the film's original U.S. release. It was released on Blu-ray by Radiance Films on February 27, 2024.

== Critical appraisal ==
Jonathan Crow of Allmovie notes that the influence of Hasebe's mentor Seijun Suzuki can be seen in Black Tight Killers. Like Suzuki, he uses the tropes of the gangster genre to create "a pop-art dreamscape" with "tail fins, flawless fashion, sudden and unexpected go-go dancing, cool jazz, and freakish violence". Hasebe's quirky use of gaudy color is singled out for comment in the review, which judges the film to be "wild, decadent fun".

In his survey of the pink film genre, Steve Fentone sums up Black Tight Killers with, "Chix with guns. What more do ya need?" Jasper Sharp writes that the plot is not especially impressive, but of Hasebe's visuals, he comments, "there is not a single individual sequence here that fails to deliver enough great dollops of saccharine-coated eye candy to satisfy even the most jaded visual gourmand". He concludes, "this simply magical film is a hoot from start to finish".

== Bibliography ==
=== English ===
- Ore ni sawaru to abunaize (1966) at IMDb
- "ORENI SAWARUTO ABUNAIZE". Complete Index to World Film.
- Sharp, Jasper (2001-05-10). "Black Tight Killers". midnighteye.com.

=== Japanese ===
- 俺にさわると危ないぜ(1966) (in Japanese). allcinema.net.
- 俺にさわると危ないぜ (in Japanese). Japanese Movie Database.
- "俺にさわると危ないぜ". Japanese Cinema Database (Agency for Cultural Affairs).
- 俺にさわると危ないぜ(邦画 ) (in Japanese). Kinema Junpo. Archived from the original on 2012-03-24.
