= Rape! 13th Hour =

- Theatrical poster for Rape! 13th Hour (1977)
- Directed by: Yasuharu Hasebe
- Written by: Yoshio Shirasaka; Chiho Katsura
- Produced by: Ryōji Itō
- Starring: Akira Takahashi; Yuri Yamashina; Yūdai Ishiyama
- Cinematography: Masaru Mori
- Edited by: Akira Suzuki
- Music by: Yamanashi Taichi
- Distributed by: Nikkatsu
- Release date: January 22, 1977 (Japan)
- Running time: 73 minutes
- Country: Japan
- Language: Japanese

Rape! 13th Hour (Japanese: レイプ２５時暴姦, Hepburn: Reipu ! 25-ji Bōkan) is a 1977 Japanese film in Nikkatsu's Roman Porno series, directed by Yasuharu Hasebe and starring Yuri Yamashina.

== Synopsis ==
A man sporting a red jacket seeks shelter at the gas station where he works. He is an anonymous serial rapist known as "Crimson" and is fleeing a vigilante group which has been pursuing him. "Crimson" and the younger gas station attendant later leave together and attack and rape a young ballerina. The incident has a life-altering effect on the younger man, who has now become addicted to rape. He also goes on a raping spree, and is joined with "Crimson" for further attacks. Together the men rape waitresses in an abandoned movie theater. Due to the inability of the police to catch the criminals, vigilante groups have been pursuing "Crimson". Eventually the duo are tracked down, captured, and taken to an empty swimming pool by a homosexual gang. There the gang sodomizes "Crimson", bashes out his teeth with a hammer, and forces him to perform fellatio on them.

== Background ==
Nikkatsu had started its SM line of Roman porno films in 1974 with the hits Flower and Snake and Wife to Be Sacrificed both featuring actress Naomi Tani and directed by Masaru Konuma. After this first highly successful venture into sexual violence, the studio's output became increasingly rougher. According to director Yasuharu Hasebe, by 1976 the studio was looking for a new direction, and contacted him to develop films in a new style to be called "Violent Pink". These would be comparable to the U.S. "roughies" film genre, violent and misogynistic, but without the whips, bondage and other traditional accoutrements of the S&M genre. Hasebe had worked with the studio in the 1960s during their "Nikkatsu Action" era, but was not comfortable with the pink film genre to which the studio had turned with the inception of the Roman porno series in 1971. Reluctant to work in the sex film genre, Hasebe later recalled warning the studio, "Are you sure you want me?... You must be aware-- my craft is very bloody."

Nikkatsu hired Hasebe, though, realizing that he might push the envelope of acceptability, the studio assigned producer Ryōji Itō to watch over him. Hasebe had known Itō from his days with Nikkatsu in the 1960s, and they had worked well together. Itō had been Hasebe's assistant director on the Alleycat Rock series. In 1976 Hasebe turned out the first two "Violent Pink" films, Rape! and Assault! Jack the Ripper. Due to the box-office success of these films, Nikkatsu assigned him more work in the genre. The third in Hasebe's "Violent Pink" films, Rape! 13th Hour has a reputation as the most extreme of the series. Nervous about the film's graphic violence, Nikkatsu re-edited it before giving it a theatrical release. Nevertheless, the Weissers write that the released version is "graphically disturbing", "incredibly savage", "offensively appalling", and that it was "long-considered the most offensive, the most grotesque movie of all time." Hasebe later recalled with amusement that the studio had made a mistake in assigning producer Itō to watch over him, as this most extreme of their trio of "Violent Pink" films was Itō's favorite.

In spite of the film's box-office success, it became highly controversial with the public and with critics. The controversy surrounding the film was similar to that in the U.S. following the release of I Spit on Your Grave a year later in 1978. Because of the outcry over the film, Nikkatsu ordered that the extreme violence in future "Violent Pink" films be curtailed. Two years later, the successful release of Kōyū Ohara's Zoom Up: Rape Site, late in 1979, returned the genre to Hasebe's original "ultra-violent" vision.

== Critical appraisal ==
In their Japanese Cinema Encyclopedia: The Sex Films, Thomas and Yuko Mihara Weisser give Rape! 13th Hour a rating of three-and-a-half out of four stars. They write that the film has allegorical meaning beyond the gratuitous on-screen violence. The film is said by some Japanese critics to be a commentary on the state of filmmaking in Japan at the time of its release. The brutalization of women in an abandoned movie theater, for example, is interpreted symbolically. Ruriko, the ballerina who is assaulted by the two men in the film, is said to have been named after the actress Ruriko Asaoka, one of Nikkatsu's stars during the pre-Roman porno "Nikkatsu action" period of the 1960s, and known at the time of the film's release as Tora-san's love interest Lily in the popular Otoko wa Tsurai yo series. Over twenty years after the first release of the film, Japanese critics held the film in high regard, with Kinema Jumpo placing it on their 1999 list of the 200 best Japanese films of the 20th century.

Some Japanese critics, however, found the film to be simply an exercise in cinematic sadism, and dismissed any claims of a message behind the mayhem. Allmovie similarly notes of the film, "any point which Rape! 25-ji Bokan may have is lost in the barrage of sickening violence". Director Hasebe denied any intention of allegory on his part, claiming that he did not use cinema in this way. He suggested that if such messages were in the film they had come from screenwriter Chiho Katsura and producer Ryōji Itō.

Jasper Sharp also gives the film a negative appraisal, calling it the poorest of Hasebe's films that he discusses in his Behind the Pink Curtain: The Complete History of Japanese Sex Cinema. He dismisses the film as a "preposterous red-blooded macho fantasy" which is little more than a series of attacks on women, and writes that the final scene in which the two rapists are attacked by the vigilante gang, "almost seems like an apology for the onscreen outrages committed in the name of entertainment". Sharp describes the film as a kind of "buddy movie" made for men who claim to be attracted by women, but are more comfortable with other men. According to Sharp, the film trivializes the psychological effects of violence on women to a ludicrous degree, showing the victims enjoying the attacks to the point where one actually gives her attacker money, and asks him to return. 10kbullets.com also judges this aspect of the film—in which the victims come to enjoy their assaults—to be quite disturbing. Set pieces which stand out, according to Sharp include car chases, fistfights, and the ballerina's rape, set to the music of Swan Lake, with pillow feathers flying around the nude woman as if they were snowflakes.

== Availability ==
Rape! 13th Hour was released theatrically in Japan on January 22, 1977. The film had not been released on video at the time of Yasuharu Hasebe's 1999 interview with Asian Cult Cinema. The director stated that it might be the film's controversial nature which caused the studio to hold back its release. Once released on videotape, it became a popular item. It was released on DVD in Japan on September 21, 2007, as part of Geneon's ninth wave of Nikkatsu Roman porno series. This release employed a new master struck from the original negative, with scratches and flaws corrected. Extras included the original theatrical trailer and a four-page booklet. English subtitles were not included on this release.

== Bibliography ==
=== English ===
- Den Boer, Michael (2008-04-18). "Rape! 13th Hour". 10kbullets.com. Archived from the original on 2010-01-04.
- Hasebe, Yasuharu. (1998). Interviewed by Thomas and Yuko Mihara Weisser in Tokyo, 1999, in Asian Cult Cinema, #25, 4th Quarter, 1999, p. 32-42.
- "RAPE! 25-JI BOKAN". Complete Index to World Film.
- Rape! 13th Hour (1977) at IMDb
- Sharp, Jasper (2008). Behind the Pink Curtain: The Complete History of Japanese Sex Cinema. Guildford: FAB Press. pp. 167, 229, 230, 344. ISBN 978-1-903254-54-7.
- Weisser, Thomas; Yuko Mihara Weisser (1998). Japanese Cinema Encyclopedia: The Sex Films. Miami: Vital Books : Asian Cult Cinema Publications. pp. 52, 53, 326, 327–328, 342, 368, 525. ISBN 1-889288-52-7.

=== Japanese ===
- レイプ２５時 暴姦(1977) (in Japanese). allcinema.net.
- レイプ２５時 暴姦 (in Japanese). Japanese Cinema Database (Agency for Cultural Affairs). Archived from the original on 2012-05-07.
- レイプ２５時 暴姦 (in Japanese). Japanese Movie Database.
- レイプ２５時 暴姦(邦画 ) (in Japanese). Kinema Junpo. Archived from the original on 2012-04-06.

== See also ==
- List of Nikkatsu Roman Porno films
