= The Princess Blade =

2001 film by Shinsuke Sato

- Film poster
- Directed by: Shinsuke Sato
- Written by: Kazuo Koike (manga); Kazuo Kamimura (manga); Kei Kunii; Shinsuke Sato
- Produced by: Taka Ichise
- Starring: Yumiko Shaku; Hideaki Itō; Yoichi Numata; Kyūsaku Shimada; Yōko Maki
- Cinematography: Taro Kawazu
- Edited by: Hirohide Abe
- Music by: Kenji Kawai
- Distributed by: ADV Films
- Release dates: December 15, 2001 (Japan); August 8, 2003 (U.S.)
- Running time: 92 minutes
- Country: Japan
- Language: Japanese

The Princess Blade (Japanese: 修羅雪姫, Hepburn: Shurayuki-hime; Lady Snowblood) is a 2001 Japanese action film directed by Shinsuke Sato in his feature directorial debut. It is a reimagining of the manga Lady Snowblood by Kazuo Koike and Kazuo Kamimura.

== Story ==
Yuki is the last surviving royal of the House of Takemikazuchi, who live in a futuristic post-apocalyptic isolationist world, where they use their skills as former Mikado guards to become hired assassins. The wise old sage Kuka, who was once Yuki's mother's bodyguard, gives Yuki information that changes her life—and her destiny. She discovers that the criminal Byakurai has a dangerous connection to her.

After learning this information, she chooses to leave the House of Takemikazuchi. She soon encounters Takashi, leader of the rebel movement, who offers Yuki a chance at revenge—and perhaps love. They soon discover similarities, for they are both trying to escape the past to start new lives.

== Cast ==
- Yumiko Shaku as Yuki
- Hideaki Itō as Takashi
- Shiro Sano as Kidokoro
- Yoichi Numata as Kuka
- Kyūsaku Shimada as Byakurai
- Yoko Chosokabe as Soma
- Yōko Maki as Aya
- Naomasa Musaka as Kiri
- Yutaka Matsushige as Anka
- Shintarō Sonooka as Chain Wielder
- Takashi Tsukamoto as Takashi's Friend
