= G-Men '75 =

Japanese detective television series (1975-1982)

- Gメン'75
- Genre: Police procedural Crime drama
- Created by: Teruo Kondô
- Starring: Tetsurō Tanba; Yosuke Natsuki; Gō Wakabayashi; Yū Fujiki; Maria Mori; Mari Natsuki; Hiroshi Miyauchi; Gō Ibuki; Takeshi Kaga; Bunjaku Han; Kyōko Enami; Daijiro Harada; Yusuke Kawazu; Yasuaki Kurata; Fujita Okamoto; Hiroshi Chiba; Toshihiko Yuki; Masahiko Tanimura; Kiyohiko Fujikawa
- Narrated by: Takayuki Akutagawa
- Theme music composer: Shunsuke Kikuchi (ep.1-306); Pierre Porte (ep.308-355, G-Men '82)
- Composers: Shunsuke Kikuchi (ep.1-306); Hiroaki Yoshino (ep.308-355, G-Men '82)
- Country of origin: Japan
- Original language: Japanese
- No. of episodes: 355

Production
- Executive producer: Teruo Kondô
- Production locations: Tokyo, Japan
- Running time: 54 minutes
- Production companies: Toei Company; TBS; Teruo Kondô

Original release
- Network: JNN (TBS)
- Release: May 24, 1975 – April 3, 1982

Related
- G-Men '82

G-Men '75 (Japanese: Gメン'75, Hepburn: G Men nanajūgo) was a Japanese crime drama television series, about a fictional undercover unit of the Tokyo Metropolitan Police Department. It was created by Teruo Kondô, who had previously created the detective show Key Hunter. Tetsurō Tamba starred as Detective Superintendent Tetsuya Kuroki, and was the only actor to appear in all 355 episodes. Other starring roles were played by Yosuke Natsuki, Yasuaki Kurata, Yū Fujiki, Gō Wakabayashi and Bunjaku Han.

G-Men aired on Saturday nights in the 9:00–9:54 p.m. time slot on the Tokyo Broadcasting System (TBS) network from May 24, 1975 to April 3, 1982. It was followed by a short-lived sequel series, premiering in 1982, along with several made-for-television films.

== Plot ==
The story revolved around a special detective agency, the eponymous G-Men. The principal character, who spanned the entire series (and continued into the sequel and specials), was Superintendent Tetsuya Kuroki, who was portrayed by Tetsurō Tamba. Kuroki directed the members of the group.

The original cast also included Yasuaki Kurata as Detective Yasuaki Kusano, trained in karate. Gō Wakabayashi joined in Episode 105, and remained to the end of the series (and the sequel). His character, Lieutenant Goro Tachibana, replaced a detective who was written out of the script.

The series tackled a number of contemporary issues, including police corruption, the US military presence in Okinawa, euthanasia, the Sanrizuka Struggle, the disputed exclusive economic zone, and the Lockheed bribery scandals. While most of the series was set in Tokyo, cases also took characters to other parts of Japan, as well as international locales like Hong Kong, Singapore, New Caledonia, Paris, Brussels, Madrid, and Copenhagen.

== Cast ==
- Tetsurō Tanba as Tetsuya Kuroki (ep.1-355)
- Yosuke Natsuki as Ken Odagiri (ep.1-223)
- Yasuaki Kurata as Yasuaki Kusano (ep.1-202)
- Yū Fujiki as Hachibei Yamada (ep.1-204)
- Daijiro Harada as Ichiro Sekiya (ep.1-33)
- Fujita Okamoto as Shinichi Tsusaka (ep.1-104)
- Mihoko Fujita as Keiko Hibiki (ep.1-103)
- Gō Wakabayashi as Goro Tachibana (ep.101-355)
- Maria Mori as Ryoko Hayami (ep.105-203)
- Go Ibuki as Takeshi Nakaya (ep.105-306)
- Mari Natsuki as Keiko Tsugawa (ep.205-251)
- Hiroshi Chiba as Akio Taguchi (ep.205-330)
- Toshihiko Yuki as Tatsuya Murai (ep.205-226)
- Yusuke Kawazu as Yoshiaki Nagumo (ep.227-305)
- Hiroshi Miyauchi as Kazuhiko Shimatani (ep.227-306)
- Harumi Nakajima as Kyoko Fubuki (ep.253-306)
- Takeshi Kaga as Shigeru Kusaka (ep.307-355)
- Kyoko Enami as Saeko Tsumura (ep.307-355)
- Bunjaku Han as Yoko Kagawa (ep.307-355)
- Sarah Lowell as Mariko Teraoka (ep.307-330)
- Masahiko Tanimura as Hajime Furuta (ep.331-355)
- Kiyohiko Fujikawa as Daichi Kazama (ep.331-355)

== Music ==
Shunsuke Kikuchi wrote the opening theme songs. Various artists, including some cast members, wrote and performed the closing songs. For most years, the lyrics were by Junya Sato, set to Kikuchi's music. Veteran announcer Takayuki Akutagawa narrated the series.

=== Ending songs ===
- "Omokage" by Yuri Shimazaki (Episode 1-58)
- "Tsuiso" by Yuri Shimazaki (Episode 59-144)
- "Michi" by Kaori Shima (Episode 145-174)
- "Omokage" by Yuri Shimazaki (Episode 175-204)
- "Requiem" by Isao Sasaki (Episode 205-229)
- "Requiem" by Yuri Shimazaki (Episode 230-233, 235)
- "Wing" by Mari Natsuki (Episode 234, 236-248)
- "Harukanaru Tabiji" by Popla (Episode 254-306)
- "Again" by Yuri Shimazaki (Episode 307-354)

== Opening sequence ==
The opening sequence featured the main cast walking along a runway with a "75" placed at the bottom, with an arrow beside it, as their characters were viewed in separate close-ups (with the name of their actors accompanying). The placement of the arrow and the "75" logo were changed as the series progressed. It was intended to film the opening at Haneda Airport, but permission was not granted, so it was filmed instead at Yashio, a district of Tokyo's Shinagawa ward, and later openings at the JMSDF Tateyama Air Base.

== Broadcast ==
The series aired on Saturday nights in the 9:00–9:54 p.m. time slot on the Tokyo Broadcasting System (TBS) network from May 24, 1975 to April 3, 1982. A sequel, G-Men '82, followed, as did the specials. It had also been broadcast in Hong Kong and Taiwan. Since Hong Kong was one of the filming locations, it was very popular there.

== Continuations ==
=== G-Men '82 cast ===
- Tetsurō Tamba as Tetsuya Kuroki
- Gō Wakabayashi as Gorō Tachibana
- Kyoko Enami as Saeko Tsumura
- Bunjaku Han as Yoko Kagawa
- Saburō Shinoda as Hayasaka
- Kentaro Shimizu as Sawada
- Koichi Miura as Shima

=== TV specials ===
- G-Men '75 Haru Dai Ikyou Satsujin no Onna (1993) Tetsuro Tamba, Masatoshi Nakamura, Mari Natsuki, Show Aikawa
- G-Men '75 Special Kaettekita Wakashishitachi (2000) Tetsuro Tamba, Nenji Kobayashi, Junichi Haruta
- G-Men '75 Special Tokyo-Hokkaido Trick Satsujinjiken (2000) Tetsuro Tamba, Nenji Kobayashi, Junichi Haruta, Raita Ryū
