= Shinjuku Outlaw: Step On the Gas =

1970 Japanese film directed by Toshiya Fujita

Shinjuku Outlaw: Step on the Gas
- Film poster
- Directed by: Toshiya Fujita
- Screenplay by: Toshiya Fujita; Shuichi Nagahara
- Starring: Tetsuya Watari; Yoshio Harada; Meiko Kaji; Mikio Narita; Kenji Imai; Masaya Oki
- Production company: Nikkatsu
- Release date: October 24, 1970 (Japan)
- Running time: 86 minutes
- Country: Japan
- Language: Japanese

Shinjuku Outlaw: Step on the Gas (Japanese: 新宿アウトロー ぶっ飛ばせ, Hepburn: Shinjuku autorō: Buttobase), also known as Step on the Gas!, is a 1970 Japanese film directed by Toshiya Fujita.

== Plot ==
Two years ago, Yuji Nishigami was in prison for an injury, and has now finally released on parole. A stranger(Nao Matsukata) is waiting for his return from prison. Nao recently failed in a deal, and was robbed Marijuana and his partner Shuhei. Nao asks Yuji to solve the incident together.

== Cast ==
- Tetsuya Watari as Yuji Nishigami
- Yoshio Harada as Nao Matsukata
- Meiko Kaji as Shoko
- Mikio Narita as Sasori
- Kenji Imai as Yuasa
- Masaya Oki as Rikiya
