= Stray Cat Rock: Sex Hunter =

- Film poster
- Directed by: Yasuharu Hasebe
- Written by: Atsushi Yamatoya; Yasuharu Hasebe
- Produced by: Masayuki Takagi
- Starring: Meiko Kaji; Rikiya Yasuoka; Tatsuya Fuji
- Cinematography: Muneo Ueda
- Edited by: Akira Suzuki
- Music by: Hajime Kaburagi
- Production company: Nikkatsu
- Distributed by: Nikkatsu
- Release date: September 1, 1970 (Japan)
- Running time: 93 minutes
- Country: Japan

Stray Cat Rock: Sex Hunter (Japanese: 野良猫ロック セックスハンター, Hepburn: Nora-neko rokku: sekkusu hantaa) or Alleycat Rock: Sex Hunter is a 1970 Japanese film directed by Yasuharu Hasebe. It is the third entry in the Stray Cat Rock or Alleycat Rock series of exploitation films initiated by Alleycat Rock: Female Boss.

== Plot ==
The plot revolves about the rivalry between a female gang (the Alleycats led by Mako) and the men of the Eagle gang run by Baron. When a member of the Alleycats turns down an advance from one of the Eagles (Susumu) in favor of her half-black boyfriend, the Eagle leader Baron, whose sister had been raped by a mixed-race individual, moves to rid the town of its racially mixed population. More problems ensue when a mixed-race stranger (Kazuma) finds favor with the Alleycats' leader Mako. The questions of race relations and nationality were especially pertinent since the film was shot near the U. S. Naval base at Yokosuka.

== Cast ==
- Meiko Kaji as Mako
- Rikiya Yasuoka as Kazuma
- Tatsuya Fuji as Baron
- Jirō Okazaki as Susumu

== Production ==
This film was shot at the same time as the previous sequel, Stray Cat Rock: Wild Jumbo. Since the female cast members were the same in the two movies, they were shuttled between the two filming locations.

== Release ==
The film was released with English subtitles on DVD by Home Vision Entertainment on June 22, 2004.
