= 1970 in Japanese television =

Events in 1970 in Japanese television.

== Debuts ==
Show	Station	Premiere Date	Genre	Original Run
Akaki Chi no Eleven	Nippon TV	April 13	anime	April 13, 1970 – April 5, 1971
Ashita no Joe	Fuji TV	April 1	anime	April 1, 1970 – September 29, 1971
Harenchi Gakuen	Tokyo Channel 12	October 1	anime	October 1, 1970 – April 1, 1971
Inakappe Taishō	Fuji TV	October 4	anime	October 4, 1970 – September 24, 1972
Mahō no Mako-chan	NET	November 2	anime	November 2, 1970 – September 9, 1971
Norakuro	Fuji TV	October 5	anime	October 5, 1970 – March 29, 1971
Ōedo Sōsamō	Tokyo Channel 12	October 3	jidaigeki	October 3, 1970 - September 29, 1984
Okusama wa 18-sai	TBS	September 29	drama	September 29, 1970 – September 28, 1971
Ōoka Echizen	TBS	March 16	jidaigeki	March 16, 1970 – March 15, 1999
The Adventures of Hutch the Honeybee	Fuji TV	April 7	anime	April 7, 1970 – December 28, 1971
Ultra Fight	TBS	September 28	drama	September 28, 1970 – September 24, 1971

== Ongoing shows ==
- Music Fair, music (1964–present)
- Key Hunter, drama (1968–1973)
- Tiger Mask, anime (1969–1971)
- Attack No. 1, anime (1969–1971)
- Hachiji da yo! Zen'in shūgō, comedy (1969-1985)
- Mito Kōmon, jidaigeki (1969–2011)
- Sazae-san, anime (1969–present)

== Endings ==
Show	Station	Ending Date	Genre	Original Run
Hakushon Daimaō	Fuji TV	September 27	anime	October 5, 1969 - September 27, 1970
Himitsu no Akko-chan	NET	October 26	anime	January 6, 1969 - October 26, 1970
Moomin	Fuji TV	December 27	anime	October 6, 1969 - December 27, 1970
Mōretsu Atarō	NET	December 25	anime	April 4, 1969 – December 25, 1970

== See also ==
- 1970 in anime
- 1970 in Japan
- List of Japanese films of 1970
