= Lady Snowblood: Love Song of Vengeance =

- Theatrical release poster
- Directed by: Toshiya Fujita
- Screenplay by: Norio Osada; Kiyohide Ohara
- Based on: Lady Snowblood by: Kazuo Koike; Kazuo Kamimura
- Produced by: Kikumaru Okuda
- Starring: Meiko Kaji; Yoshio Harada; Juzo Itami; Kazuko Yoshiyuki
- Cinematography: Tatsuo Suzuki
- Edited by: Osamu Inoue
- Music by: Kenjiro Hirose
- Production company: Tokyo Eiga
- Distributed by: Toho
- Release date: 15 June 1974 (Japan)
- Running time: 89 minutes
- Country: Japan
- Language: Japanese

Lady Snowblood: Love Song of Vengeance (Japanese: 修羅雪姫 怨み恋歌, Hepburn: Shurayuki-hime - Urami renka) is a 1974 Japanese film directed by Toshiya Fujita and starring Meiko Kaji. It is a sequel to the 1973 film Lady Snowblood, itself an adaptation of the manga series of the same name by Kazuo Koike and Kazuo Kamimura.

== Plot ==
Yuki Kashima is surrounded by policemen on a beach. She fights and kills several of them but is overwhelmed. She is quickly tried and sentenced to death by hanging, but suddenly rescued by the mysterious Seishiro Kikui, head of Secret Police. Inside his headquarters, he propositions Yuki to spy on an "enemy of the State", the anarchist Ransui Tokunaga. Ransui is in possession of a critical document which Seishiro seems quite obsessed with, deeming it highly dangerous to the stability of the government. If Yuki can obtain and deliver the document to Seishiro, he will grant her immunity from her charges.

Yuki infiltrates Ransui's home posing as a maid, and sets about looking for the document. But the more she observes Ransui, the more she questions the path Seishiro has put her on. When Ransui confides in Yuki, knowing full well who she is, asking her to deliver the document to his brother Shusuke, Yuki will be forced to decide her allegiance.

== Cast ==
- Meiko Kaji as Yuki Kashima, Lady Snowblood
- Juzo Itami as Ransui Tokunaga
- Kazuko Yoshiyuki as Aya Tokunaga
- Yoshio Harada as Shusuke Tokunaga
- Shin Kishida as Seishiro Kikui
- Toru Abe as Kendo Terauchi

== Staff ==
- Cinematography - Tatsuo Suzuki
- Sword fight arranger - Kunishirō Hayashi

== Production ==
Lady Snowblood: Love Song of Vengeance was greenlit after the moderate financial success of the first film. As screenwriter Norio Osada had approached the original film as a standalone adaptation, the second film freed him to write an original story not directly based on the manga. In later years, Osada deemed the script unsatisfactory, partly owing to different creative approaches between him, co-writer Kiyohide Ohara and director Toshiya Fujita; however, he felt that the script's shortcomings also enabled Fujita to make the film more in his own style, which he had not been able to do on the first film. The anarchist Ransui Tokunaga was based on Kōtoku Shūsui.

== Release ==
Lady Snowblood: Love Song of Vengeance was released theatrically in Japan on 15 June 1974 where it was distributed by Toho. The film was released on DVD in the United States by AnimEigo with English-language subtitles on March 24, 1998. The film was released on Blu-ray and DVD by the Criterion Collection along with its predecessor, Lady Snowblood (1973), as The Complete Lady Snowblood.
