= Stray Cat Rock: Machine Animal =

- Directed by: Yasuharu Hasebe
- Starring: Meiko Kaji; Tatsuya Fuji; Bunjaku Han
- Production company: Nikkatsu
- Release date: November 22, 1970
- Running time: 82 minutes
- Country: Japan
- Language: Japanese

Stray Cat Rock: Machine Animal (Japanese: 野良猫ロック マシン・アニマル, Hepburn: Nora-neko rokku: Mashin animaru), also known as Alleycat Rock: Machine Animal, is a 1970 Japanese film. It is the fourth entry in the Stray Cat Rock or Alleycat Rock series of exploitation films initiated by Alleycat Rock: Female Boss.

== Plot ==
A group of female bikers try to help an American Vietnam war deserter escape to Sweden by selling LSD.

== Cast ==
- Meiko Kaji
- Tatsuya Fuji
- Bunjaku Han as Yuri
