= Midnight Eagle =

- Theatrical release poster
- Directed by: Izuru Narushima
- Screenplay by: Yasuo Hasegawa; Kenzaburo Iida
- Based on: Midnight Eagle by Tetsuo Takashima
- Produced by: Michihiko Umezawa; Masakazu Yoda; Teruo Noguchi; Tomiyasu Moriya; Kei Fujiki
- Starring: Tatsuya Fuji; Yoshihiko Hakamada; Ken Ishiguro; Nao Ōmori; Takao Osawa; Yūko Takeuchi; Hiroshi Tamaki; A-Saku Yoshida
- Cinematography: Hideo Yamamoto
- Edited by: William M. Anderson
- Music by: Takeshi Kobayashi
- Production companies: Universal Pictures Japan; Shochiku; Geneon Entertainment; TV Asahi; Asahi Broadcasting Corporation; Nagoya Broadcasting Network; Hokkaido Television Broadcasting; The Niigata Television Network 21; Kyushu Asahi Broadcasting; IMAGICA; USEN; Destiny
- Distributed by: Shochiku Company; Shochiku Eizo Company; Universal Pictures; Strand Releasing
- Release date: October 2, 2007 (United States)
- Running time: 92 minutes
- Country: Japan
- Language: Japanese

Midnight Eagle (Japanese: ミッドナイト・イーグル, Hepburn: Middonaito Iiguru) is a 2007 action film directed by Izuru Narushima and written by Yasuo Hasegawa and Kenzaburo Iida, based on the novel by Tetsuo Takashima. Midnight Eagle is the third film directed by Izuru Narushima.

The film opened in the United States on October 2, 2007 in Los Angeles. It was also shown October 20, 2007 at the Tokyo International Film Festival. The film opened in limited release in the United States in New York City on November 23, 2007, and opened in Los Angeles on December 7, 2007.

== Production ==
Executive producers were Keiji Kameyama, Kazutaka Akimoto, Yasuhide Uno, Riki Takano, and Kanjiro Sakura. Producers were Michihiko Umezawa, Masakazu Yoda, Teruo Noguchi, Tomiyasu Moriya, and Kei Fujiki. The film was shot with the full cooperation of the Japan Ground Self Defense Force, Japan Air Self-Defense Force, and Ministry of Defense. Mountaineer Hirofumi Konishi was the special advisor for the scenes set in the Northern Alps. Before shooting started, the crew of the film was given training in snow-covered mountains. Midnight Eagle was the first mountain film set in Japan since The Precipice in 1958.

== Plot ==
A top secret American forces strategic bomber known as "Midnight Eagle" suddenly vanishes in the Japanese Hida Mountains.

== Cast ==
- Takao Osawa as Yuji Nishizaki
- Yūko Takeuchi as Keiko Arisawa
- Hiroshi Tamaki as Shinichiro Ochiai
- A-Saku Yoshida as Major Akihiko Saeki
- Yoshihiko Hakamada as Toshimitsu Fuyuki
- Nao Ōmori as Major Kensuke Saito
- Ken Ishiguro as Tadao Miyata
- Tatsuya Fuji as Prime Minister Watarase

== Critical reception ==
The film received mixed reviews by Western critics. As of November 24, 2007 on the review aggregator Rotten Tomatoes, 20% of critics gave the film positive reviews, based on 5 reviews. On Metacritic, the film had an average score of 48 out of 100, based on 6 reviews.
