= Kaerazaru hibi =

- DVD cover
- Directed by: Toshiya Fujita
- Written by: Toshiya Fujita; Kyohei Nakaoka
- Produced by: Hiroshi Okada
- Starring: Jun Etō; Toshiyuki Nagashima
- Production company: Nikkatsu
- Release date: August 19, 1978 (Japan)
- Running time: 99 minutes
- Country: Japan
- Language: Japanese

Kaerazaru hibi (Japanese: 帰らざる日々; lit. "Days Not Returning"), also known as The Days of No Return, is a 1978 Japanese film directed by Toshiya Fujita.

== Synopsis ==
The story is about a high school boy (Toshiyuki Nagashima) in Tokyo returning to his home town of Nagano upon the death of his father.

== Cast ==
- Jun Etō as Ryuzo Kuroiwa
- Toshiyuki Nagashima as Tatsuo Nozaki
- Mayumi Asano as Makiko Takemura
- Kaori Takeda as Yumi Hira

== Reception ==
Kaerazaru hibi was nominated for the Award of the Japanese Academy in 1979 for Best Director and Best Screenplay. Director Toshiya Fujita won the Readers' Choice Award given by Kinema Junpo in 1979 as Best Japanese Film Director for the film.

3rd Hochi Film Awards:

- Won: Best Newcomer - Toshiyuki Nagashima

== Availability ==
The film was released by Nikkatsu on DVD August 6, 2004.
