= Retaliation (film) =

- Directed by: Yasuharu Hasebe
- Written by: Yoshihiro Ishimatsu; Keiji Kubota
- Starring: Akira Kobayashi; Joe Shishido; Hideaki Nitani; Meiko Kaji
- Cinematography: Muneo Ueda
- Edited by: Mutsuo Tanji
- Music by: Hajime Kaburagi
- Production company: Nikkatsu
- Release date: October 5, 1968
- Running time: 94 minutes
- Country: Japan
- Language: Japanese

Retaliation (縄張はもらった, Shima wa moratta) is a 1968 Japanese yakuza film directed by Yasuharu Hasebe.

== Cast ==
- Akira Kobayashi as Jiro Sagae
- Jo Shishido as Hino
- Hideaki Nitani as Hakozaki
- Tamio Kawaji as Naruse
- Meiko Kaji (credited as Masako Ota) as Saeko Hayafune
- Tatsuya Fuji as Shinjo

== Production ==
Retaliation was Hasebe's third film as a director. It was filmed in Marunouchi and Sakura, Chiba.

== Release ==
The film premiered on October 5, 1968. It was re-released in 2012 as part of the Kawasaki Shinyuri Film Festival on 8 October 2012. Arrow Video released the film 2015 first time on Blu-ray Disc and DVD.

== Reception ==
Chris D., author of Outlaw Masters of Japanese Film described Retaliation as "a decent programmer" and that "staging is effective but occasionally it results in cluttered compositions that contribute to narrative confusion". The review concluded that 'Hasebe takes his story seriously, because the performances and realistically downbeat situations save the picture".

Sight & Sound compared the film to those of Seijun Suzuki who Hasebe had worked with previously as an assistant director. The review stated that Retaliation was "never be quite as visually or conceptually wild as Suzuki's, but they share something of the same breakneck cutting and tumultuous approach to staging action."

== Notes ==
=== Sources ===
- D., Chris (2005). Outlaw Masters of Japanese Film. I.B.Tauris. ISBN 085771547X.
