= Tetsuo Takashima =

Japanese writer

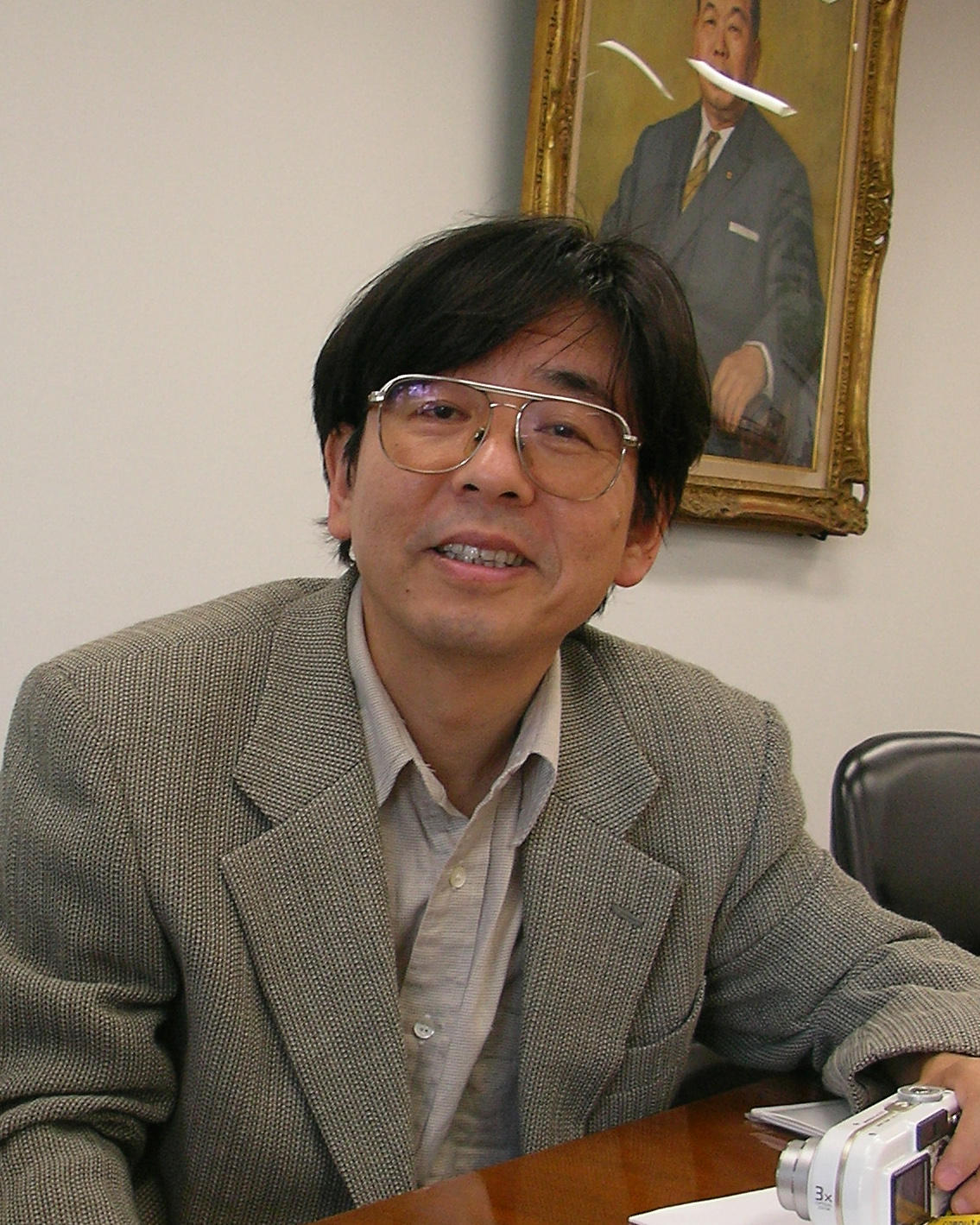

Tetsuo Takashima (高嶋 哲夫 Takashima Tetsuo, born July 7, 1949) is a contemporary Japanese author active in a number of genres that include science fiction, mystery fiction, historical fiction, social commentary, and juvenile fiction.

== Biography ==
- 1949 Okayama Birth
- 1973 Keio University Faculty-of-Technology Graduation
- 1975 Keio University Graduate School Engineering Graduate Course Master Course End
- 1975 Japan Atomic Energy Research Institute Research Worker
- 1978 University of California Studying Abroad
- 1995 Mystery Writers of Japan Member
- 2000 Japan Writer's Association Member
- 2001 National Coaching School Cooperative Society Director
- 2007 Filmize Midnight Eagle (Shochiku-Universal Pictures) reviewed by Matt Zoller Seitz in The New York Times (subscription required)(23 November 2007)).

== Works in English translation ==
- Fallout (original title: Merutodaun [Meltdown]), Vertical, 2013
- Megaquake: How Japan and the World Should Respond (original title: Kyodai Jishin No Hi [A day of Huge Earthquake]), Potomac Books, 2015
- TSUNAMI, Shueisha, 2016
- THE WALL: The Refugees' Path to a New Republic, Museyon, 2020
- THE GENE OF LIFE, Museyon, 2021

== Awards ==
- 1979 - Atomic Energy Society of Japan Technical Prize
- 1990 - North Japan Literary Prize: Homecoming (帰国, Kikoku)
- 1994 - Shosetsu Gendai Mystery Newcomer Award: Fallout
- 1999 - Suntory Mystery Award, Grand-prix and Reader Prize: Intruder
- 2006 - Iue Cultural Prize
- 2017 - Energy Forum Award Prize: Fukushima Dai-2 No Kiseki (福島第二の奇跡,Miracle of Fukushima II Nuclear Power Plant)

== Works ==
=== Novels ===
- 1999 Intruder (イントゥルーダー)
- 1999 Spica (スピカ 原発占拠)
- 2000 Dirty you (ダーティー・ユー)
- 2000 Midnight eagle (ミッドナイトイーグル)
- 2000 Friends: Sixteen (フレンズ シックスティーン)
- 2000 The captive of hell (冥府の虜, Meifu No Toriko)
- 2001 Petro bacteria can be followed (ペトロバクテリアを追え!, Petro bacteria o Oe!)
- 2001 Truman's letter (トルーマン・レター)
- 2001 Metropolitan Government Office blasting (都庁爆破, Tocho Bakuha)
- 2002 The Gene of Life (命の遺伝子, Inochi No Idenshi)
- 2002 The Wind of Afghanistan (アフガンの風, Afugan No Kaze)
- 2003 Merutodaun [Meltdown] (メルトダウン) (Fallout, Vertical, 2013)
- 2003 The False Finance (虚構金融, Kyoko Kin'yu)
- 2004 M8 (M8, Emu Eito)
  - Manga adaptation: Illustrated by Shinji Hiramatsu (2005)
- 2005 Tsunami (津波, Tsunami)
- 2008 Firefly (ファイアー・フライ)
- 2008 Jemini's Ark (ジェミニの方舟, Jemini No Hakobune)
- 2009 Catch The Wind (風をつかまえて, Kaze o Tsukamaete)
- 2009 Chase (追跡, Tsuiseki)
- 2009 The Wild God (乱神, Ran-shin)
- 2010 Pennies from Heaven (タナボタ, Tanabota)
- 2010 The Pandemic (首都感染, Shuto Kansen)
- 2011 Shinsai Kyaraban (震災キャラバン)
- 2011 Sazankurosu no Tsubasa (サザンクロスの翼)
- 2013 Fly Trap (フライ・トラップ)
- 2013 Rising Road (ライジング・ロード)
- 2014 Capital Collapse (首都崩壊, Shuto-Houkai)
- 2015 Eruption of Mt.Fuji (富士山噴火, Fujisan-Funka)
- 2016 Floating (浮遊, Fu-Yu)
- 2016 Okinawa Confidential (沖縄コンフィデンシャル 交錯捜査)
- 2017 Okinawa Confidential 2 "Blue Dragon" (沖縄コンフィデンシャル ブルードラゴン)
- 2018 Terrorism In The Official Residence (官邸襲撃)
- 2018 Hurricane (ハリケーン)
- 2019 Okinawa Confidential 3 "The Way of Life of Lekios" (沖縄コンフィデンシャル レキオスの生きる道)
- 2020 Red Sand (紅い砂, Akai Suna)
- 2021 EV (イブ)

=== Manga series ===
- 2006 Animato (アニマート) (Illustrated by Takanori Yasaka)

=== Essays ===
- 1982 " America No Gakko Seikatsu (アメリカの学校生活, U.S. School Life) "
- 1984 " California No Akane-chan (カリフォルニアのあかねちゃん, My Akane of California) "
- 2000 " Juku Wo Gakko Ni (塾を学校に, It is to a school about a private school) "(Collaboration)
- 2001 " Kouritsu Gakko Ga Nakunaru (公立学校がなくなる, A public school dies) "(Collaboration)
- 2005 " Kyodai Jishin No Ato Ni Osottekita Koto (巨大地震の後に襲ってきたこと, Be attacked by Huge Earthquake) "
- 2006 " Kyodai Jishin No Hi (巨大地震の日, A day of Huge Earthquake) (Megaquake: How Japan and the World Should Respond translate by Robert D. Eldridge, Potomac Books, 2015)"
- 2013 " Tokai Tonankai Nankai Kyodai Rendo Jisjin (東海・東南海・南海 巨大連動地震, Nankai Trough massive earthquake) "
- 2015 " Sekai Ni Warawareru Nihon No Genpatsu Senryaku (世界に嗤われる日本の原発戦略, World laugh nuclear power strategy of Japan) "
- 2016 " Fukushima Dai-2 No Kiseki (福島第二の奇跡, Miracle of Fukushima II Nuclear Power Plant) "
- 2020 " Shutokansengo no Nihon (「首都感染」後の日本, Japan after the "Capital Infection") "
- 2021 " Shuto Okayama (首都岡山, Capital City Okayama) "
