= Lady Snowblood (manga) =

Manga written by Kazuo Koike and illustrated by Kazuo Kamimura

- The cover of Vol. 1 of the Dark Horse Comics collection

修羅雪姫 (Shurayuki-hime)
- Manga
- Written by: Kazuo Koike
- Illustrated by: Kazuo Kamimura
- Published by: Shueisha
- English publisher: NA: Dark Horse Comics
- Imprint: Playboy Zōkan
- Magazine: Weekly Playboy
- Original run: 29 February 1972 – 6 March 1973
- Volumes: 2 (4 in English)

Lady Snowblood (Japanese: 修羅雪姫, Hepburn: Shurayuki-hime) is a Japanese manga series written by Kazuo Koike and illustrated by Kazuo Kamimura. It was serialized in Shueisha's Weekly Playboy magazine from February 1972 to March 1973. The series revolves around the title character, a female assassin who seeks vengeance against the bandits who murdered her stepfather and older half-brother and raped her mother.

Lady Snowblood was translated into English and published in four volumes by Dark Horse Comics between 2005 and 2006. The manga was adapted into a live-action film of the same name starring Meiko Kaji in 1973, which was followed by Lady Snowblood: Love Song of Vengeance in 1974. The manga and film adaptations have influenced a number of other works.

== Title ==
The Japanese title Shurayuki-hime is a pun on Snow White's Japanese name (白雪姫, Shirayuki-hime; "Princess Snow-White"). Additionally, shura nods to the Buddhist path of the asura, in which a devout follower is prepared to kill. The title was translated as Lady Snowblood because Asura is associated with the term shuraba "scene of a great battle" or "scene of carnage".

== Plot ==
Four bandits - Shokei Tokuichi, Okono Kitahama, Gishiro Tsukamoto, and Banzo Takemura - murder the husband and son of Sayo, a woman whom they also rape. Sayo kills Tokuichi, but is confined to a women's prison for life; she then seduces multiple men to conceive a child whom she wants to deliver her vengeance on the three remaining bandits. Months later on a cold snowy night in winter, Sayo gives birth to a baby girl, whom the other inmates name Oyuki after the snow. Sayo tells the midwife who had delivered Oyuki her story and makes her the girl's guardian before dying from childbirth complications.

Raised by the midwife, Oyuki is subjected to hellish training by a Buddhist priest. By the time she has grown into an adult, Oyuki has become the assassin known as Syura Yuki (transl. Lady Snowblood). With her sword concealed in the shaft of her umbrella, Oyuki travels around Japan to hunt down her mother's enemies and deliver her vengeance. Along the way, Oyuki does contract killings, seduces her male targets, dons disguises, and even has the pickpocket Kiku—who had served time at the same prison where Oyuki was born—train her to become an expert thief.

After Oyuki gets them a hojicho, an impoverished man named Matsuemon and his fellow beggars aid her by looking for the bandits and informing her of their whereabouts. Matsuemon even convinces Oyuki to recruit the writer Miyanara, whom she inspires to publish books about her life to draw out her mother's enemies and who becomes a father figure to her. With Miyanara and the beggars' help, Oyuki commits her acts of vengeance: she frames the mastermind Okono as a murderer so she will be convicted; when Tsukamoto discovers Oyuki's plan, he holds Miyanara hostage, only to be outsmarted and slain by her; when Takemura begs Oyuki for forgiveness, she kills him and sends his body falling into the sea, yet saves his young daughter, Kobue, from a life of prostitution.

Having avenged her family, Syura Yuki throws her umbrella sword into the sea.

== Characters ==
Oyuki, aka Syura Yuki

Oyuki/Syura Yuki (transl. Lady Snowblood)
Oyuki, also known as Syura Yuki, is the main protagonist of the manga. A calm and beautiful woman, she has formidable skills in using a sword hidden in her umbrella. She has been entrusted with a task of vengeance by her mother Sayo to kill the three surviving criminals who murdered her half-brother and stepfather. When necessary, she uses her sex appeal on men to distract her foes.
Miyanara-san
A writer who pens Oyuki's story in an effort to draw the final two tormentors out in the open. Although antagonistic at first, he comes to treat Oyuki as his daughter, even risking his life to assist in her quest. It is implied through their final interaction that Oyuki will return to take care of him, as he is the closest thing to a father that she has ever had.
Matsuemon-san
The leader of a band of beggars who assists Oyuki in discovering the location of her kill list in return for Oyuki stealing a hojicho for him.

== Production ==
Written by Kazuo Koike and illustrated by Kazuo Kamimura, Lady Snowblood was serialized in Shueisha's Weekly Playboy magazine between 29 February 1972, and 6 March 1973. The chapters were collected and published under the Playboy Zōkan imprint in two volumes on 10 December 1972, and 15 March 1973. Since then the manga has been republished in various editions by different publishers, including a 1976–1977 three volume edition by Akita Shoten, a five volume 1985 edition by Takeshobo, and a two volume 2001 edition by Kadokawa Shoten.

Lady Snowblood: Resurrection Chapter (修羅雪姫 復活之章, Shurayuki-hime: Fukkatsu no Shō) was serialized in Weekly Playboy from November 1973 to June 1974. In 2006, this sequel was collected and published in two volumes, in original Japanese and French-translated editions.

Lady Snowblood was translated and published in English between 2005 and 2006 by Dark Horse Comics as a series of four volumes, collected into more-or-less self-contained chapters.

== Media ==
=== English volumes ===
| No. | Title | Release date | ISBN |
|---|---|---|---|
| 1 | The Deep-Seated Grudge (Part 1) | 21 September 2005 | 1-59307-385-2 |
Chapter 1: Sumida River Loincloth Cutting Board; Chapter 2: Stylish Woman and Umbrella over rain of Blood; Chapter 3: Love, Hate, String of Blood, and Confession; Chapter 4: Dead Cherry Blossoms and the dance of short sleeve with white blade; Chapter 5: Rokumeikan Murder Panorama
In chapter 1, Lady Snowblood is contracted to assassinate the oyabun from a gambling den. She cheats using powdered dice to lure out the oyabun before killing him and the guards outside in the snow. In chapter 2, Lady Snowblood is hired to assassinate Jinba, a brothel owner and find out what makes his brothel so popular. She starts a fire on one of Jinba's buildings before helping to put it out to gain his trust. Upon learning the brothel's popularity is in a sex show, she kills Jinba. In chapter 3, a child is born in a women's prison. The mother suffers terribly while giving birth but before dying, she tells the tale of how her husband and son were murdered and she was brutally raped. She escaped their clutches by killing one of her tormentors, Tokuichi Shoei, but was caught by the police and sentenced to life imprisonment. This child, Oyuki, is cursed to carry out the vengeance her mother was unable to. This is where the reader learns Lady Snowblood's true name. In chapter 4, Oyuki is given a contract to slay Kotozo Shimaya, who runs a rickshaw business which preys on unaccompanied women. In chapter 5, Oyuki learns the skills of a pickpocket from an inmate friend of her mother. Using her newly acquired skills, she slays two women and two men and she frames corrupt high-ranking officials into shutting down a rokumeikan (Social Hall), which was for the westernization of Japan.
| 2 | The Deep-Seated Grudge (Part 2) | 28 December 2005 | 1-59307-443-3 |
Chapter 6: Hojicho and Precious Flowers; Chapter 7: Harsh Training and a Blooming Countenance; Chapter 8: Love, Pawnshop of Life and Merciless Disposal; Chapter 9: Blackmailer Genjirô and the song of the phantom, Part 1
In chapter 1, Oyuki makes a deal with Matsuemon, the leader of band of thieves / beggars. In return for Hojicho, a document containing the dates of people's deaths, he will find the current locations of her mother's tormentors. Chapter 2 recounts Oyuki's brutal sword training as a child to become Lady Snowblood. In chapter 3, Oyuki frames Okono Kitahama, one of her mother's four tormentors, with a fake life insurance business and for murder. Okono is the one on Oyuki's vengeance list who she does not kill. In chapter 4, Oyuki is contracted to find blackmailer Genjirô. It concludes in a cliffhanger, with Oyuki about to be raped by Genjirô.
| 3 | Retribution (Part 1) | 29 March 2006 | 1-59307-458-1 |
Chapter 9: Blackmailer Genjirô and the song of the phantom, Part 2; Chapter 10: Unveiling of a Pretty Woman and a Strange Story; Chapter 11: Master Crook, the Wanderer
Picking up from the previous chapter, Oyuki escapes Genjirô's clutches and deals a fatal blow to him. However, before he dies she decides to have sex with him. In chapter 2, Oyuki is contracted to kill a yakuza controlling an area, so that it can be developed into a museum. In chapter 3, Oyuki enlists the help of a writer to chronicle her life in a newspaper in an effort to locate the final two people on her assassination list.
| 4 | Retribution (Part 2) | 28 June 2006 | 1-59307-532-4 |
Chapter 12: Bloom of Youth, White Uniform, and Song of Tears; Chapter 13: Indecent Photographer's confession; Chapter 14: An Account of How Gishiro Strikes Back; Chapter 15: Bamboo's Tears
In chapter 12, Oyuki hides as a nurse in a mental health clinic to avoid capture. In chapter 13, a photographer uses men to rape his female clients. The photos of the rape are then used as blackmail. Oyuki is hired to destroy the photos and slay the photographer. In chapter 14, Gishiro captures Mr. Miyanara. Oyuki, disguised as an old lady, slips into Gishiro's house and murders him in cold blood, leaving only Hanzo Takameru. In chapter 15, Hanzo Takameru is now an old man with a young daughter supporting him. Oyuki kills Hanzo, but saves his young daughter from being sold as a prostitute. She lies to her that her father committed suicide. Finally obtaining retribution for her mother, the final panel shows an umbrella, which houses Oyuki's blade, being tossed into the sea and Yuki's marriage to a man.

=== Film adaptations ===
In 1973, the manga was adapted into a feature film of the same name by director Toshiya Fujita, starring Meiko Kaji. The film was followed by Lady Snowblood: Love Song of Vengeance in 1974. A science fiction remake titled The Princess Blade, starring Yumiko Shaku, was released in 2001.

Lady Snowblood and its 1973 adaptation are credited as major sources of inspiration behind Quentin Tarantino's Kill Bill: Volume One and Two and its protagonist The Bride (Beatrix Kiddo), as well as the Marvel Comics supervillainess Lady Bullseye (Maki Matsumoto), created by Ed Brubaker, Marko Djurdjevic, and Clay Mann, and voiced by Reiko Aylesworth in the animated series Hit-Monkey.

Additionally, the manga and film adaptation are an inspiration for the 2021 anime series Joran: The Princess of Snow and Blood.

=== Stage adaptations ===
In November 2021, the stage adaptation of the manga was performed at the CBGK Shibugeki theater in Tokyo, with Yui Imaizumi as the main character. A sequel titled Lady Snowblood – 50th Anniversary Revival – Lady Snowblood and the Eight Rogues (修羅雪姫-復活祭50th- 修羅雪と八人の悪党) was performed in February 2022.

=== Video game adaptations ===
Character of Setsuka from the SoulCalibur franchise (started as a "Soul Edge" in the first entry of the series) of fighting video games was heavily inspired by Oyuki, both in visuals and her fighting/fencing style. Setsuka uses a knife concealed in an umbrella, exactly the same way Oyuki does, and also has nearly identical backstory and motivations for her actions in all respective SoulCalibur games where she appears. Some of Setsuka's extra costumes and additional color palettes directly reference and mirror Oyuki's clothes in original Lady Snowblood manga and both movie adaptations.

== Reception ==
Tom Rosin from Manga Life considers Lady Snowblood "another cold-blooded revenge drama from the author of Lone Wolf", and says he enjoyed the mix of Western modernization and Japanese traditionalism. W .E. Wallo from Blogcritics.org finds the English translation weak compared to that of Lone Wolf and Cub, but recommends it to any fans of the latter series. Similarly to Tom Rosin, he praises the prevalent East–West dichotomy.
