= Assault! Jack the Ripper =

1976 film by Yasuharu Hasebe

- Theatrical poster for Assault! Jack the Ripper (1976)
- Directed by: Yasuharu Hasebe
- Written by: Chiho Katsura
- Produced by: Ryōji Itō
- Starring: Tamaki Katsura; Yutaka Hayashi
- Cinematography: Masaru Mori
- Music by: Hajime Kaburagi
- Distributed by: Nikkatsu
- Release date: July 7, 1976
- Running time: 71 minutes
- Country: Japan
- Language: Japanese

Assault! Jack the Ripper (暴行切り裂きジャック, Bōkō Kirisaki Jakku) is a 1976 Japanese film in Nikkatsu's Roman Porno series (in the "Violent Pink" subgenre). It was directed by Yasuharu Hasebe and has in the lead roles Tamaki Katsura and Yutaka Hayashi.

== Synopsis ==
A young couple engage in a rampage of murder, rape, and mayhem in order to stimulate their sexual appetites.

== Cast ==
- Tamaki Katsura as Yuri
- Yutaka Hayashi as Ken
- Yuri Yamashina as Girl in Straitjacket
- Natsuko Yashiro as Beautiful Girl
- Rei Okamoto as Matured Woman
- Naomi Oka as Call Girl
- Luna Takamura as Woman in Boutique

== Critical reception ==
Assault! Jack The Ripper! was the second of three "Violent Pink" films Yasuharu Hasebe directed in 1976, between Rape! and Rape! 13th Hour. Of the three, Hasebe, named Rape! as his favorite. Screenwriter Chiho Katsura, however, thought that Assault! Jack The Ripper! was the best, and this is the one that had the best critical reception. Some critics interpreted the film as an allegorical comment on the state of Japanese cinema in the mid-1970s. Hasebe recalled, "...it wasn't my intention. I don't like to play those games within cinema. If such a thing exists in the movie, then it was a conspiracy between Producer Itō and scripter Katsura."

Robert Firsching at Allmovie writes, "Hasebe strikes the perfect balance between blood and sex." He notes, however, that the director's next entry in the "Violent Pink" genre, Rape! 13th Hour would go too far, and almost single-handedly stop Nikkatsu from producing films of this sort.

Actress Tamaki Katsura had long hair before taking her role for this film. Hasebe told her that he wished for her character to sport an Afro perm. Realizing that this would limit her career choices for a time, Katsura nevertheless agreed to the change in hairstyle for the film. Usually playing secondary characters, it was Katsura's first starring role. For her performance in the film, she was nominated as Best Actress at the mainstream Japan Academy Prize. The Weissers, in their Japanese Cinema Encyclopedia: The Sex Films, write that Katsura was the critic's favorite to win, but that the extreme nature of the film and her performance alienated many voters.

== Availability ==
Assault! Jack the Ripper was released on DVD in Japan on March 21, 2007, as part of Geneon's seventh wave of Nikkatsu Roman porno series. Mondo Macabro released the film with English subtitles on Region 0 on October 28, 2008. Among the extras included on the disk are an interview with Japanese cinema writer Jasper Sharp, and the Roman Porno episode of the British television program Mondo Macabro.

== Bibliography ==
=== English ===
- Bôkô Kirisaki Jakku at IMDb
- "BOKO! KIRISAKI JACK". Complete Index to World Film.
- Hasebe, Yasuharu. (1998). Interviewed by Thomas and Yuko Mihara Weisser in Tokyo, 1999, in Asian Cult Cinema, #25, 4th Quarter, 1999, p. 32-42.
- Ketchum, Jack (1999). "Yasuharu Hasebe's Assault! Jack the Ripper; commentary on the film". Asian Cult Cinema (#25): 28–31.
- Sharp, Jasper (2008). Behind the Pink Curtain: The Complete History of Japanese Sex Cinema. Guildford: FAB Press. pp. 229, 344. ISBN 978-1-903254-54-7.
- Weisser, Thomas; Yuko Mihara Weisser (1998). Japanese Cinema Encyclopedia: The Sex Films. Miami: Vital Books : Asian Cult Cinema Publications. ISBN 1-889288-52-7.

=== Japanese ===
- 暴行切り裂きジャック (1976) (in Japanese). allcinema.net.
- 暴行切り裂きジャック (in Japanese). Japanese Movie Database.
- "暴行切り裂きジャック". Japanese Cinema Database (Agency for Cultural Affairs). Archived from the original on 2011-10-08.
- 暴行切り裂きジャック (in Japanese). www.nikkatsu-romanporno.com. Archived from the original on 2009-08-08.
- 暴行切り裂きジャック (in Japanese). www.walkerplus.com. Archived from the original on 2005-03-09.
