= Tatsuya Fuji =

Japanese actor (born 1941)

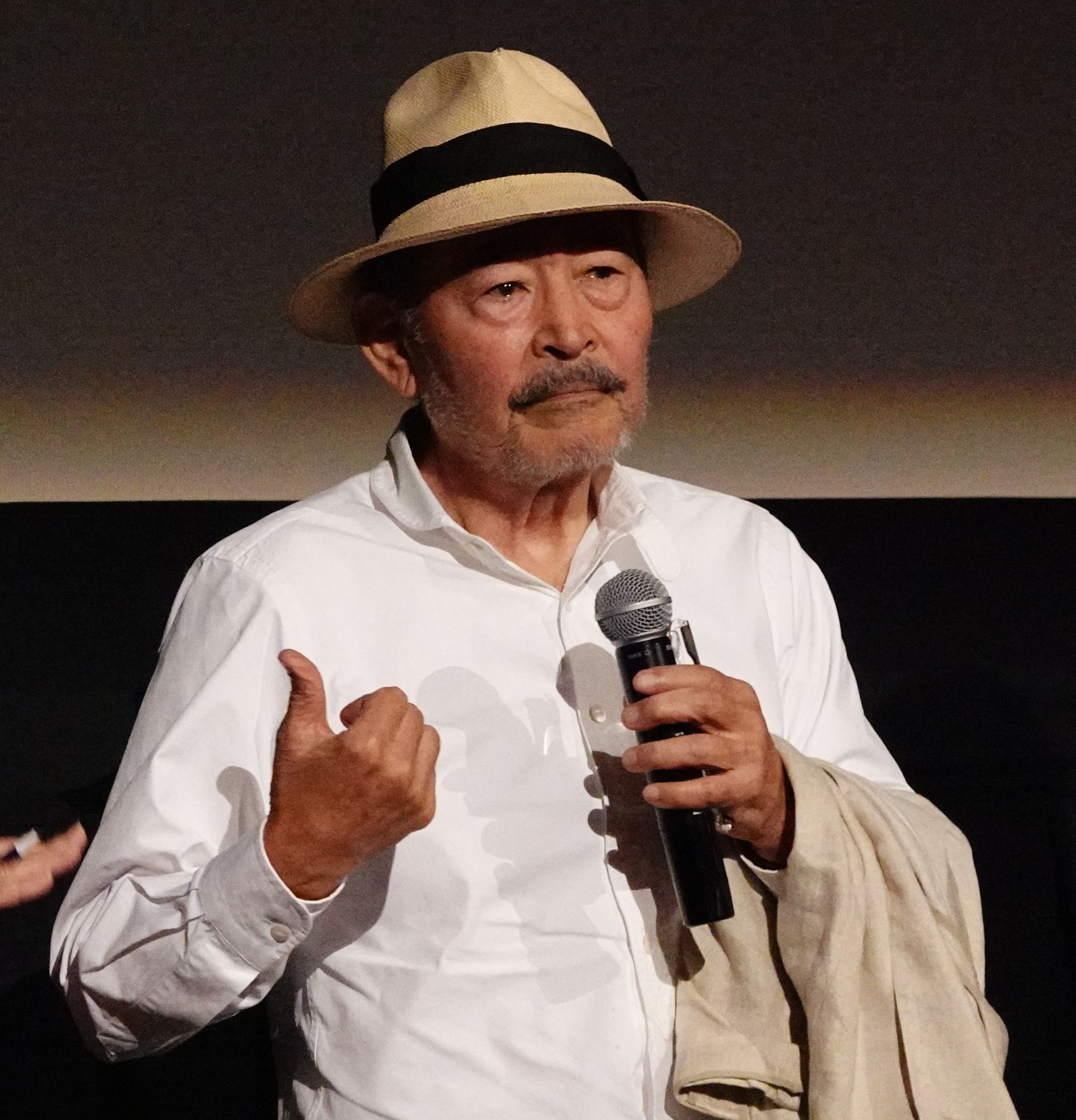
- Fuji in 2024
- Born: 27 August 1941 (age 85); Beijing, Republic of China
- Occupation: Actor
- Years active: 1962–present
- Spouse: Izumi Ashikawa (m. 1968)

Tatsuya Fuji (藤 竜也, Fuji Tatsuya; born 27 August 1941) is a Japanese actor. He was born in Beijing and raised in Yokohama. In 1962, Fuji joined Nikkatsu Company and began his acting career with small roles in Nikkatsu film. In 1968, Fuji married actress Izumi Ashikawa. He gained popularity through his role in Jikandesuyo on TBS. He played his first leading role in the 1974 film Ninkyō Hanaichirin.

He starred in two films (Empire of Passion and Bright Future) that were entered into the Cannes Film Festival.

Fuji co-starred in Kiyoshi Kurosawa's Bright Future with Tadanobu Asano and Joe Odagiri. In 2005, he won the Golden Goblet Award for Best Actor for his work in the Village Photobook. In 2015, Fuji won best actor award of Tokyo Sports Film Award for his work in the Ryuzo and the Seven Henchmen.

In 2023, he won the Silver Shell for Best Leading Performance at the 2023 San Sebastián Film Festival for his role in the Great Absence.

== Selected filmography ==
=== Film ===
- Black Sun (1964)
- Taking The Castle (1965)
- Massacre Gun (1967)
- Gappa: The Triphibian Monster (1967)
- Monument to the Girls' Corps (1968)
- Moeru Tairiku (1968)
- Daikanbu Nagurikomi (1969)
- Savage Wolf Pack (1969)
- Retaliation (1968)
- Alleycat Rock: Female Boss (1970)
- Stray Cat Rock: Sex Hunter (1970)
- Stray Cat Rock: Wild Jumbo (1970)
- Stray Cat Rock: Machine Animal (1970)
- Gyakuen Mitsusakazuki (1971)
- Ninkyō Hanaichirin (1974)
- In the Realm of the Senses (1976)
- Empire of Passion (1978)
- P.P. Rider (1983)
- Keshin (1986)
- Bright Future (2003)
- The Man in White (2003)
- Rikidōzan (2004)
- Umizaru (2004)
- Kamataki (2005)
- Village Photobook (2005)
- Midnight Eagle (2007)
- Shiawase no Kaori (2008)
- Pandemic (2009)
- Soup Opera (2010)
- Hoshi Mamoru Inu (2011)
- Ogawa no Hotori (2011)
- Hayabusa: Harukanaru Kikan (2012)
- Zakurozaka no Adauchi (2014)
- Ryuzo and the Seven Henchmen (2015), Ryuzo
- My Dad and Mr. Ito (2016), Aya's father
- Radiance (2017)
- Dad, Chibi is Gone (2019)
- Aircraft Carrier Ibuki (2019), Keiji Wakui
- The Stormy Family (2019), Ittetsu Suzuki
- Go! Go! Sakura Club (2023), Momojiro Oda
- Takano Tofu (2023)
- Great Absence (2024)

=== Television ===
- Taiyō ni Hoero! (1973)
- Katsu Kaishū (1974), Hijikata Toshizō
- Daitsuiseki (1978)
- Pro Hunter (1981)
- Hojo Tokimune (2001)
- Kazoku no Uta (2012)
- Kabukimono Keiji (2015), Maeda Keiji
- Yasuragi no Sato (2017), Takai
- Welcome Home, Monet (2021), Tatsumi Nagaura
- Rosanjin's Stove (2026), Rosanjin
