= Zoom Up: Rape Site =

Zoom Up Bōkō Gemba
- Directed by: Kōyū Ohara
- Starring: Erina Miyai
- Distributed by: Nikkatsu
- Release date: September 8, 1979
- Running time: 67 minutes
- Country: Japan
- Language: Japanese

Zoom Up Bōkō Gemba (ズームアップ 暴行現場) is a 1979 Japanese film in Nikkatsu's Roman porno series, directed by Kōyū Ohara. This film is the first in Nikkatsu's "Zoom Up" series and its success led to six more sequels in the same motif. It represented a return to the ultra-violent, misogynistic "Violent Pink" style which Nikkatsu had curtailed after the 1977 Rape! 13th Hour.

== Plot ==
Tomoko (Erina Miyai) is investigating a rapist who is terrorizing the city, but at the same time derails the search by grabbing the wrong suspects. In one scene, which the Weissers call "staggeringly repulsive", the rapist inserts a lightbulb into his female victim and starts kicking her stomach until it shatters inside her. The Weissers describe the film as misogynist and mean-spirited, but add that "the project is expertly handled by director extraordinaire Ohara."
