= Lady Snowblood (film) =

1973 Japanese jidaigeki film

- Theatrical release poster
- Directed by: Toshiya Fujita
- Screenplay by: Norio Osada
- Based on: Lady Snowblood by Kazuo Koike; Kazuo Kamimura
- Produced by: Kikumaru Okuda
- Starring: Meiko Kaji; Toshio Kurosawa; Masaaki Daimon; Miyoko Akaza; Kō Nishimura
- Cinematography: Masaki Tamura
- Edited by: Osamu Inoue
- Music by: Masaaki Hirao
- Production company: Tokyo Eiga
- Distributed by: Toho
- Release date: 1 December 1973 (Japan)
- Running time: 96 minutes
- Country: Japan
- Languages: Japanese; English

Lady Snowblood (Japanese: 修羅雪姫, Hepburn: Shurayuki-hime) is a 1973 Japanese jidaigeki film directed by Toshiya Fujita and starring Meiko Kaji. Based on the manga series of the same name by Kazuo Koike and Kazuo Kamimura, the film recounts the tale of Yuki (Kaji), a woman who seeks vengeance upon three of the people who raped her mother and killed her half brother. The film's narrative is told out of chronological order, jumping between present and past events. Alongside Kaji, the film's cast includes Toshio Kurosawa, Masaaki Daimon, Miyoko Akaza, and Kō Nishimura.

Lady Snowblood was released theatrically in Japan on 1 December 1973, and was distributed by Toho. It spawned a sequel, Love Song of Vengeance (1974). Lady Snowblood served as a major inspiration for the 2003 Quentin Tarantino film Kill Bill and its lead character, The Bride.

== Plot ==
In 1874, a woman named Sayo gives birth to a baby girl in a women's prison. Naming her daughter Yuki after the snow falling outside, Sayo confides to the inmates how four criminals murdered her husband and son a year ago, three of whom then brutally raped her. While she managed to stab her captor Shokei Tokuichi to death, she was arrested and imprisoned for life. She then seduced any prison guard or other man she could in order to conceive Yuki. Due to difficulties during the birth, she dies shortly after. Her final words are for the child to be raised to carry out vengeance against the three remaining tormentors. In Meiji 15 (1882), Yuki undergoes brutal training in sword fighting under the priest Dōkai to become her mother's wrath incarnate.

Yuki, now twenty and an assassin going by the name Shurayuki-hime, kills a group of men and their leader Shibayama. She visits a poor village looking for a man called Matsuemon, the leader of an underground organization of street beggars, and asks him to find her mother's surviving tormentors in return for having killed Shibayama for him. Matsuemon's intel leads her to Banzō Takemura, now an alcoholic with gambling debts whose daughter Kobue works as a prostitute to support him. Yuki kills him, then learns that the last of her mother's rapists, Gishirō Tsukamoto, is suspected dead after a shipwreck three years earlier when she first attempted to find him.

Yuki is followed by a reporter named Ashio Ryūrei, who learned of her story from Dōkai, who persuaded him to publish it as a means to draw out one of Sayo's tormentors, Okono Kitahama. Okono sends her henchmen to kidnap Ashio and torture Yuki's location out of him, but Ashio refuses to tell. Yuki enters Okono's estate and kills several of her men. Okono escapes, and Yuki and Ryūrei pursue and find her dying body hanged. An enraged Yuki slices her corpse in half.

Ashio tells her that Gishirō is his father, who faked his death when he learned of Yuki's mission. She tracks Gishirō to a masquerade ball and kills a man acting as his decoy. The real Gishirō shoots Ashio. Ashio stops him from shooting Yuki and she stabs through Ashio into Gishirō. She then cuts Gishirō's throat as he shoots her. He falls over a railing and onto the ballroom floor.

Yuki, wounded, is stabbed by a waiting Kobue, who has been pursuing Yuki to avenge her own father's murder. Yuki collapses in the snow, apparently dead. The following morning, however, she opens her eyes and rises from the bloody snow.

== Cast ==
- Meiko Kaji as Yuki Kashima ("Lady Snowblood")
  - Mayumi Maemura as young Yuki
- Kō Nishimura as Dōkai the priest
- Toshio Kurosawa as Ryūrei Ashio
- Masaaki Daimon as Gō Kashima
- Miyoko Akaza as Sayo Kashima
- Eiji Okada as Gishirō Tsukamoto
- Sanae Nakahara as Okono Kitahama
- Noboru Nakaya as Banzō Takemura
- Takeo Chii as Shokei Tokuichi
- Hitoshi Takagi as Matsuemon
- Akemi Negishi as Tajire no Okiku
- Yoshiko Nakada as Kobue Takemura
- Rinichi Yamamoto as Maruyama

== Production ==
Kikumaru Okuda, a producer from the Toho subsidiary Tokyo Eiga, wanted to make a film starring actress and singer Meiko Kaji, known at the time for her role in Toei's successful Female Prisoner Scorpion series. He felt that a film adaptation of the Lady Snowblood manga would be ideal for such a project, and contracted Norio Osada to write the script and Toshiya Fujita to direct. Although the two men were friends, they were aware of their differing creative approaches; it was also Osada's first manga adaptation and Fujita's first action-heavy film. According to Osada, Fujita usually preferred a less tight script so he could shape his own films, but Osada presented his first draft to his colleague Kinji Fukasaku, who told Fujita that he would make the film if Fujita was not willing; the director immediately relented. Osada wrote the film with the intention that it would serve as a standalone adaptation of the manga rather than a launching point for a series.

The film's production was first announced in the February 1973 issue of Kinema Junpo; although Fujita was stated to be the director, the announcement revealed that Tomoko Ogawa was the preferred choice for the title character of Kazuo Koike, the writer of the original manga. When Okuda approached Kaji for the role, she had become increasingly uninterested in the Female Prisoner Scorpion films, and was dissatisfied with playing roles in violent exploitation films, noting that the lead characters of both Female Prisoner Scorpion and Lady Snowblood were vengeful women. She accepted the role due to a desire to work again with Fujita, as they had developed a rapport when both were contracted to Nikkatsu, and after reading the manga. Kaji was also contracted to sing the film's theme song, "Shura no hana" (修羅の花, The Flower of Carnage), which would later be re-used in Quentin Tarantino's Kill Bill. Toei initially attempted to prevent Kaji from taking the role, although she would return to the studio to make her final Female Prisoner Scorpion film, 701's Grudge Song, after completing work on Lady Snowblood.

Lady Snowblood was produced on a relatively low budget, and filmed with a minimal length of film (20,000 feet). Yuki's sword was made from duralumin and weighed approximately 1.5 kg, and swinging it frequently hurt Kaji's arm. Kaji also recalled that at one point during production, a malfunctioning blood squib drenched her in fake blood.

== Release and reception ==
Lady Snowblood was released in Japan on 1 December 1973, where it was distributed by Toho.

On review aggregator website Rotten Tomatoes, the film has an approval rating of 100% based on 10 reviews. Metacritic, which uses a weighted average, assigned the film a score of 80 out of 100, based on 6 critics, indicating "generally favorable" reviews. TV Guide gave the film three out of five stars, calling it "certainly entertaining, but unnecessarily distancing".

== Sequel and influence ==
The moderate financial success of the first film spawned a sequel, Lady Snowblood: Love Song of Vengeance, released in 1974. Another adaptation of the original manga, titled The Princess Blade, was released in 2001.

A 1977 Hong Kong martial arts film, Broken Oath, directed by Jeong Chang-hwa and starring Angela Mao in the leading role is an unofficial remake of Lady Snowblood.

Lady Snowblood was a major inspiration for Quentin Tarantino's Kill Bill (2003–2004), which contains stylistic but also direct references to the movie, for example re-using Kaji's The Flower of Carnage at a moment itself very similar to Lady Snowblood's own last scene. According to Meiko Kaji, Tarantino made the cast and crew of Kill Bill watch DVDs of Lady Snowblood during filming breaks.

The 2017 music video for "rockstar" by Post Malone references scenes from Lady Snowblood.

In April 2018, electronic musician, Alice Glass embarked on her North American tour with American singer Zola Jesus with electronic musician Pictureplane opening on select dates. The tour paying homage to this film. Both singles were accompanied by music videos.

== Home media ==
Lady Snowblood was released on VHS in 1997, and was later released on DVD by AnimEigo in 2004. In 2012, the film was released in a box set with Lady Snowblood 2: Love Song of Vengeance on Blu-ray and DVD by Arrow Video. In January 2016, the film was again released with Love Song of Vengeance on Blu-ray and DVD by the Criterion Collection.
