= Bunjaku Han =

Taiwanese actress based in Japan (1948–2002)

- 范文雀
- Born: April 15, 1948; Taiwan
- Died: November 5, 2002 (aged 54)
- Resting place: Miura Reien, Miura Peninsula, Japan
- Occupation: Actress
- Spouse: Akira Terao (m. 1973; div. 1974)

Bunjaku Han (范文雀, Han Bunjaku) (Chinese: Fàn Wénquè) was a Japanese-speaking Taiwanese actress who lived and worked in Japan.

== Career ==
She was mostly known as a character actress. She became famous playing an unfortunate half-Japanese, half African-American volleyball player called Jun Sanders in a 1969 volleyball drama called Sain wa V. She went on to appear in films such as Alleycat Rock: Female Boss and the Playgirl TV detective series. In her later career, she provided the Japanese voice-over for the lead character in Dr. Quinn, Medicine Woman and appeared as the mother of Itsuki Fujii in Love Letter. She was also active in stage acting in the later part of her career, and was due to appear in a new production at the time of her unexpected death.

She had a brief career as a singer, releasing three singles in the 1970s.

== Personal life ==
She was a Taiwanese citizen, but did not speak Chinese.

She married Akira Terao in 1973 and retired, but they divorced in 1974.

She died of complications of cancer. Her grave is at Miura Reien on the Miura Peninsula. On the grave, her name is spelt in roman letters "Fuan Bunjaku". Ironically her most famous acting role, Jun Sanders, was of a girl who died prematurely due to cancer.

== Filmography ==
- Alleycat Rock: Female Boss (1970)
- Stray Cat Rock: Machine Animal (1970)
- Stray Cat Rock: Wild Jumbo (1970)
- Lill, My Darling Witch - original title Kawaii Akujo (可愛い悪女; "The pretty bitch") (1971)
- Kawaii Akujo: Koroshi no Mae ni Kuchizuke o (可愛い悪女 殺しの前にくちづけを; "The pretty bitch: kiss then kill") (1972)
- Proof of the Man (1977) - Naomi, the car accident victim
- White Love (1979) - Taeko Nogawa
- New Female Convict: Scorpion - original title Shin Joshū Sasori 701 Gō (新女囚さそり ７０１号) (1976) Nami Matsushima (Sasori)'s sister
- Kaseki no Koya (化石の荒野) (1982) Keiko Tayama
- Love Letter (1995)
- Innocent World - original title Innosento wārudo (イノセントワールド) (1998)

== Television ==
=== Regular ===
- Sain wa V as Jun Sanders
- Playgirl as Yumin Darowa
- Attention Please (1970-1971 version), as Sanae Tamura
- G-Men '82

=== Guest ===
- G-Men '75
- Tokyo Megure Keishi
- Tantei Monogatari (1979) - episode 14 Fukushū no Merodii (復讐のメロディー) as Akiko Osugi

== Discography ==
- Anata ga Nikumenai ("I can't hate you") / Saigo no Ichijikan ("The last hour") released by Warner Brothers Japan on 25 February 1971.
- Sasurai no Barokku / Nichiyō no Asa Ochiba released by Nihon Crown on 20 August 1972
- Kagerō / Kaerimichi released by Nihon Columbia on 1 March 1977

== Writings ==
- Han, Bunjaku (January 1992). ドント・タッチ・ミー (Donto Tatchi Mii) [Don't Touch Me]. Nurihiko. ISBN 978-4890540129. - Her memoirs
