= Blind Woman's Curse =

1970 film

- Film poster
- Directed by: Teruo Ishii
- Screenplay by: Teruo Ishii; Yoshida Sone
- Produced by: Hideo Koi; Shiro Sasaki
- Starring: Meiko Kaji; Hoki Tokuda; Makoto Sako
- Cinematography: Shigeru Kitazumi
- Edited by: Osamu Ionue
- Music by: Hajime Kaburagi
- Production company: Nikkatsu
- Distributed by: Dainichi Eihai
- Release date: 20 June 1970 (Japan)
- Running time: 84 minutes
- Country: Japan

Blind Woman's Curse (Japanese: 怪談昇り竜, Hepburn: Kaidan Nobori Ryū; lit. Ghost Story Rising Dragon) is a 1970 Japanese ero guro yakuza film directed by Teruo Ishii.

== Plot ==
Akemi (Kaji) is a dragon tattooed leader of the Tachibana yakuza clan. In a duel with a rival gang, Akemi slashes the eyes of an opponent and a black cat appears to lap the blood from the gushing wound. The cat and the victim of the slashing go on to seek revenge on Akemi's gang, leaving a trail of dead yakuza girls with their dragon tattoos skinned from their bodies.

== Cast ==
- Meiko Kaji - Akemi Tachibana
- Hoki Tokuda (ja:ホキ徳田) - Aiko Goda
- Makoto Satō - Tani
- Hideo Sunazuka - Kantaro
- Shirō Otsuji - Senba-tatsu
- Ryōhei Uchida as Aozora
- Toru Abe - Dobashi
- Tatsumi Hijikata - Ushimatsu, hunchback dancer

== Release ==
Blind Woman's Curse was released in Japan on 20 June 1970. It was distributed theatrically in the United States by Toho International on 6 August 1971.

=== Home Video ===
Blind Woman's Curse was released on DVD in Region One on 8 May 2007 by Discotech Media.

It was released on Blu-ray by Arrow Video in Region Two on 31 March 2014 and in Region One on 21 April 2015.
