= Toshiya Fujita (director) =

Japanese actor and director (1932–1997)

- Born: January 16, 1932; Heijō, Korea, Empire of Japan (present-day Pyongyang, North Korea)
- Died: August 30, 1997 (aged 65); Shinjuku, Tokyo, Japan
- Other names: Shigeya Fujita, Binpachi Fujita
- Years active: 1955–1997
- Spouse: Miyoko Akaza

Toshiya Fujita (藤田 敏八, Fujita Toshiya; January 16, 1932 – August 30, 1997), also known as Shigeya Fujita (藤田繁矢, Fujita Shigeya), was a Japanese film director, film actor, and screenwriter. He is well-regarded in Japan for his youth films but is best known abroad for Lady Snowblood and Lady Snowblood 2: Love Song of Vengeance, films not typical of his usual style.

== Life and career ==
Fujita was born in Heijō, Korea, which was then under the Empire of Japan (now Pyongyang, North Korea). After graduating from Tokyo University, he joined the Nikkatsu studio in 1955. At Nikkatsu, he worked as a publicist, screenwriter, cinematographer and assistant director until he made his debut as a director in 1967. His first film, about a juvenile delinquent, Hikō shōnen: Hinode no sakebi, won him the 1967 New Directors Award from the Directors Guild of Japan. After a successful sequel, Hikō shōnen: Wakamono no toride , Fujita was tapped by Nikkatsu to direct two installments in their youth-oriented Alleycat Rock series which had been initiated in 1970 by director Yasuharu Hasebe with Alleycat Rock: Female Boss. Fujita's two episodes, Stray Cat Rock: Wild Jumbo and Alleycat Rock: Crazy Riders '71, both starred actress Meiko Kaji.

Fujita's August 1971 film for Nikkatsu, Wet Sand in August, a melodramatic look at disenchanted youth in a beach setting, was both a popular hit and a major critical success. Three months later Nikkatsu inaugurated their Roman porno era of big budget softcore pink films. Fujita stayed on with Nikkatsu and his two sequels to Wet Sand in August, the 1972 Scent of Eros in August and the 1973 Sweet Smell of Eros were both produced as part of the Roman porno line. Fujita, however, was able to forge a compromise with the sex and nudity demands of the Roman porno genre to bring these films, especially Sweet Smell of Eros, close to mainstream acceptance.

In the 1970s, Nikkatsu was still producing non-adult films as well as Roman porno and Fujita made a number of realistic dramas about youth and the generation gap including the 1973 Did the Red Bird Escape? (Akai tori nigeta) and two works from 1974, Virgin Blues and The Red Lantern, the latter film having been described as a young couple's "futile attempt to escape from a restrictive society." The two films for which Fujita is best known outside Japan, Lady Snowblood (1973) and its sequel Lady Snowblood 2: Love Song of Vengeance (1974), were produced by an independent company during a short hiatus from Nikkatsu. These violent action movies, quite different from Fujita's usual style, reunited him with Meiko Kaji, the star of his earlier Alleycat Rock films.

Fujita continued directing Roman porno films for Nikkatsu in the mid and late 1970s but the studio seldom interfered as long as the requisite nude scenes were provided and Fujita was able to produce works about relationships with a deft feel for characterization. He returned to his early roots in juvenile delinquent dramas with Female Delinquent: A Docu-Drama (1977) based on the autobiography of real life bad girl Mako Minato. His 1978 film Kaerazaru hibi told the story of a teenaged boy returning to his home town after the death of his father. In 1979 Fujita directed two films focusing on the problems of family life. So Soft, So Cunning, considered one of Fujita's best films, is "a somber look at family life in contemporary Japan", while Tenshi o yūwaku is a serious portrayal of the problems faced by a young couple (Momoe Yamaguchi and Tomokazu Miura) in the suburbs.

Fujita made only a few movies in the 1980s including the 1981 romantic drama Play It, Boogie-Woogie for Kadokawa Pictures. He returned to Nikkatsu for the 1983 film Double Bed about a disillusioned group of friends in their thirties and their illicit affairs. Fujita had also established himself as an actor with appearances in director Seijun Suzuki's 1980 film Zigeunerweisen and Juzo Itami's Tampopo (1985). In 1984 Fujita directed the crime thriller The Miracle of Joe Petrel and his last film as a director was Revolver, where a single gun connects the lives of several people.

Fujita continued his acting career up to the time of his death in August 1997 at age 65.

== Awards ==
Toshiya Fujita was nominated twice for the Award of the Japanese Academy: in 1979 for Best Director and Best Screenplay for Kaerazaru hibi and 1981 as Best Supporting Actor for Zigeunerweisen. He also won the Readers' Choice Award given by Kinema Junpo in 1979 as Best Japanese Film Director for Kaerazaru hibi.

== Filmography ==
=== Director ===
- Hikō shōnen: Hinode no sakebi (非行少年 陽の出の叫び) (June 1967)
- Hikō shōnen: Wakamono no toride (非行少年 若者の砦) (April 1970)
- Stray Cat Rock: Wild Jumbo (野良猫ロック ワイルドジャンボ, Nora neko rokku: Wairudo janbo) (Aug. 1970)
- Shinjuku Outlaw: Step On the Gas (新宿アウトロー ぶっ飛ばせ, Shinjuku autorō: Buttobase) (Oct. 1970)
- Alleycat Rock: Crazy Riders '71 (野良猫ロック 暴走集団’７１, Nora neko rokku: Bōsōshūdan '71) (Jan. 1971)
- Wet Sand in August (八月の濡れた砂, Hachigatsu no nureta suna) (Aug. 1971)
- Scent of Eros in August (八月はエロスの匂い, Hachigatsu wa Erosu no nioi) (Aug. 1972)
- Seduction of Eros (エロスの誘惑, Erosu no yūwaku) (Oct. 1972)
- Did the Red Bird Escape? (赤い鳥逃げた？, Akai tori nigeta?) (Feb. 1973)
- Sweet Smell of Eros (エロスは甘き香り, Erosu wa amaki kaori) (Mar. 1973)
- Lady Snowblood (修羅雪姫, Shurayuki-hime) (Dec. 1973)
- The Red Lantern (赤ちょうちん, Aka chōchin) (Mar. 1974)
- Lady Snowblood 2: Love Song of Vengeance (修羅雪姫 怨み恋歌, Shurayuki-hime: Urami koiuta) (June 1974)
- Younger Sister (妹, Imōto) (Aug. 1974)
- Virgin Blues (バージンブルース, Bājin burūsu) (Nov. 1974)
- Honō no shōzō (炎の肖像) (Dec. 1974)
- Barefoot in Blue Jeans (裸足のブルージン, Hadashi no burūjin) (Dec. 1975)
- Girl's Pleasure: Man Hunting (横須賀男狩り 少女・悦楽, Yokosuka otokogari: Shōjo: Etsuraku) (May 1977)
- Female Delinquent: A Docu-Drama (実録不良少女 姦, Jitsuroku furyō shōjo: kan) (July 1977)
- Dangerous Liaisons (危険な関係, Kiken na kankei) (Mar. 1978)
- Kaerazaru hibi (Aug. 1978)
- So Soft, So Cunning (もっとしなやかに もっとしたたかに, Motto shinayaka ni, motto shitataka ni) (April 1979)
- Jūhassai, umi e (十八歳、海へ) (Aug. 1979)
- Tenshi o yūwaku (天使を誘惑) (Dec. 1979)
- Play It, Boogie-Woogie (スローなブギにしてくれ, Surōna bugi ni shite kure) (April 1981)
- Daiamondo wa kizutsukanai (ダイアモンドは傷つかない) (May 1982)
- Double Bed (ダブルベッド, Daburu beddo) (Aug. 1983)
- The Miracle of Joe Petrel (April 1984)
- Beyond the Shining Sea (波光きらめく果て, Hakō kirameku hate) (July 1986)
- Revolver (リボルバー, Riborubā) (Oct. 1988)

=== Actor ===
- Zigeunerweisen (1980)
- Haru no Kane (1985) as Tomio Murata
- Tampopo (1985)
- Sayonara Ri Kōran (1989) as Tomu Uchida
