= Stray Cat Rock: Wild Jumbo =

- Film poster
- Directed by: Toshiya Fujita
- Screenplay by: Toshiya Fujita; Shuichi Nagahara
- Starring: Bunjaku Han; Meiko Kaji; Tatsuya Fuji
- Production company: Nikkatsu
- Release date: August 1, 1970 (Japan)
- Running time: 84 minutes
- Country: Japan
- Language: Japanese

Stray Cat Rock: Wild Jumbo (Japanese: 野良猫ロック ワイルドジャンボ, Hepburn: Nora neko rokku wairudo janbo) or Alleycat Rock: Wild Jumbo is a 1970 Japanese film directed by Toshiya Fujita. It is the second of the five "Nora neko rokku" (Stray Cat Rock or Alleycat Rock) low budget exploitation films begun by Alleycat Rock: Female Boss.

== Plot ==
A group of wild young people, after enjoying antics in a jeep, kidnap a wealthy woman driver (Bunjaku Han) by shooting out her car tires. They set her free but she forms an attraction to a member of the group. They begin a romance and she tells him she is the mistress of the leader of a religious organization called Shinkyo Gakkai.

The group dig up a stash of weapons buried in a school courtyard at the end of the second world war. They plan to rob the organization.

== Cast ==
- Meiko Kaji as C-ko (c子)
- Bunjaku Han as Asako (アサ子)
- Takeo Chii as Taki (タキ)
- Tatsuya Fuji as Gani-shin (ガニ新)
- Yusuke Natsu as Jiro (ジロー)
- Soichiro Maeno as Debo (デボ)
- Mari Shiraki
- Akiko Wada
- Ryōhei Uchida as Officer

== Production ==
When the first film in the series Alleycat Rock: Female Boss proved to be a success, Nikkatsu released this sequel only three months later. Director Fujita had previously made teenage delinquent movies for the studio.

The weapons seen in the film are the Nambu pistol and the type 11 light machine gun, both WW2 era Japanese military weapons.
