= Meiko Kaji =

Japanese actress and singer (born 1947)

- 梶 芽衣子
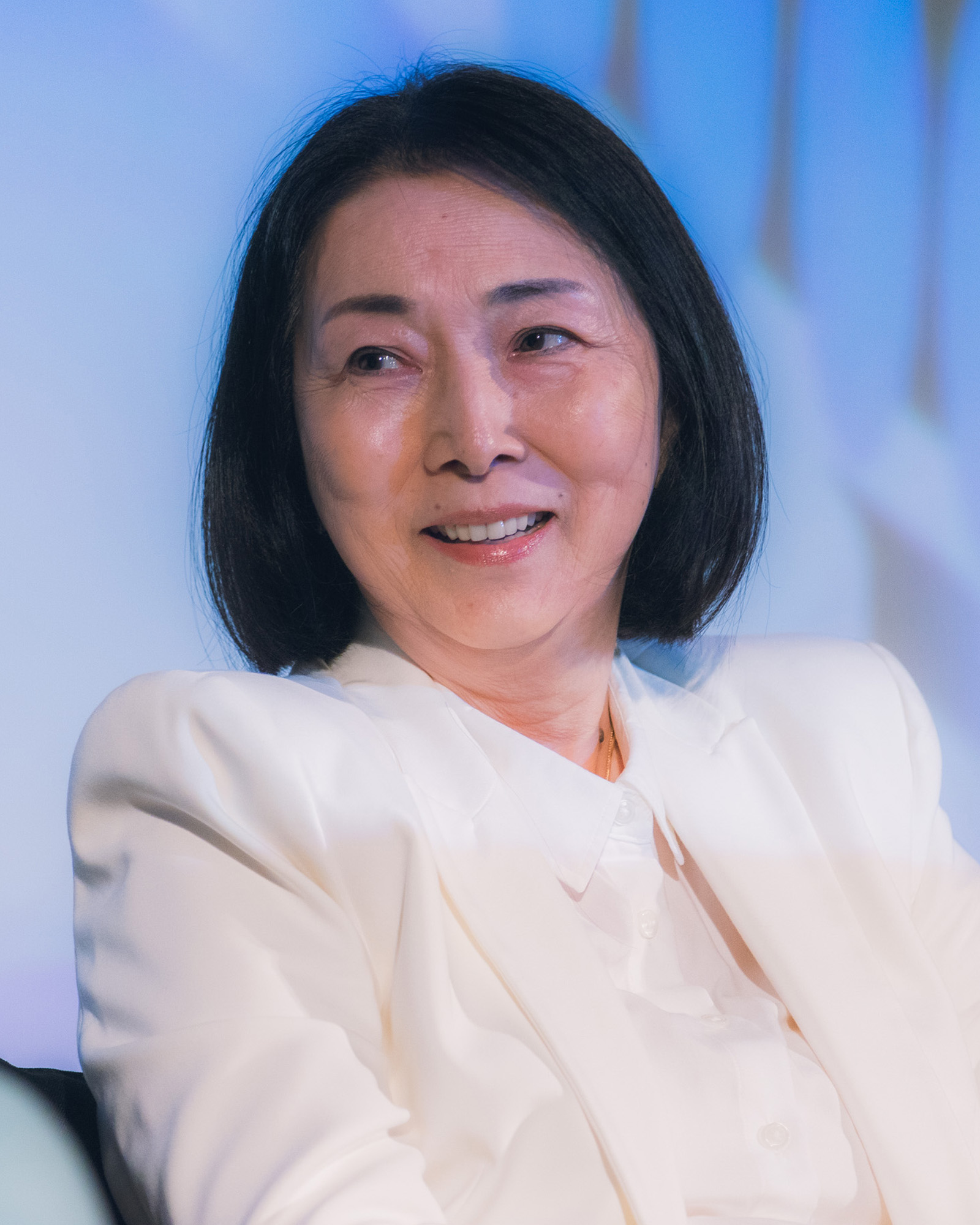
- Kaji in 2025
- Born: Masako Ohta; March 24, 1947 (age 79); Chiyoda, Tokyo, Japan
- Occupations: Actress, singer
- Years active: 1965–present
- Height: 163 cm (5 ft 4 in)
- Children: 1

Meiko Kaji (梶 芽衣子, Kaji Meiko; born March 24, 1947) is a Japanese actress and singer. With over 100 film and television credits since the 1960s, her most prolific period was the 1970s, when she achieved fame for her starring roles as outlaws and vengeful women in the film series Stray Cat Rock, Wandering Ginza Butterfly, Female Prisoner Scorpion and Lady Snowblood. Kaji also performed as a singer, releasing records concurrently with her film career and beyond, often performing the theme songs for the films in which she starred.

== Career ==
=== Acting career ===
Meiko Kaji was born Masako Ōta in the Kanda area of Tokyo and graduated from the Yakumo Academy high school in Meguro, Tokyo. She began to work in the film industry under her real name at Nikkatsu studio in 1965 after graduating from high school. Her first supporting film role was in 1968 in Retaliation. In 1969 she appeared in Nihon Zankyoden, one of a series of films directed by Masahiro Makino, who recognized her acting ability and provided her with the stage name of Meiko Kaji. In 1970 she had a starring role in Blind Woman's Curse directed by Teruo Ishii, and from 1970 to 1971 she appeared in the Noraneko Rokku (Stray cat/Alleycat Rock) series of films about delinquent and rebellious young people and gangs, appearing in all five films in different character roles.

In 1971, Nikkatsu would move more towards production in the pink film business, which were more overtly sexual; and to avoid roles in such films, Kaji moved to the Toei Company. There she starred in the four-part Female Prisoner 701: Scorpion series of women in prison revenge films as Nami Matsushima/"Matsu the Scorpion", a woman sent to prison for seeking revenge and her attempts to escape, and in 1972 she first starred in the Wandering Ginza Butterfly yakuza/gangster series as Higuchi Nami.

In 1973 she starred in Lady Snowblood directed by Toshiya Fujita and distributed by Toho, a revenge film set in late 1800s Japan based on the manga of the same name, where she played the deadly assassin Yuki. It is considered by many critics to be her most famous role, particularly outside of Japan, and would later go on to inspire other media, including Quentin Tarantino's Kill Bill films. A year later she reprised her role as Yuki in the sequel Lady Snowblood 2: Love Song of Vengeance in 1974. She went on to appear in several of Kinji Fukasaku's films, such as Yakuza Graveyard in 1976 and in 1978 starred in Sonezaki Shinjū, where she earned nominations for Best Actress at five different award shows, winning four of them.

By the end of the 1970s, Kaji left major film roles following a combination of overwork amidst rampant production schedules and underpayment, but had occasional film roles in the 1980s and 2010s, including Under the Open Sky in 2020. Kaji also worked in television since the 1980s, in 1989 portraying the informant Omasa in the television drama Onihei Hankachō, the Shochiku–Fuji Television version starring kabuki actor Nakamura Kichiemon II. In 2022, she appeared in the 2022 Amazon Prime Video anthology series Modern Love Tokyo for the episode "Nursing My Son, and Some Grievances". She was cast as Genkai in the Netflix television series YuYu Hakusho (2023), a live action adaptation of the YuYu Hakusho manga.

During her acting career Kaji received acting offers from non-Japanese film studios, including those from Hollywood, but declined them, as she felt she could not give a good performance in a language other than Japanese.

In March 2026, the Japan Society in New York hosted a retrospective of her films, where she appeared on the first three nights.

=== Music career ===
Kaji is also a singer. She sang the theme song to Lady Snowblood, "Shura no Hana" (修羅の花), and the theme song of the Female Convict Scorpion series, "Urami Bushi" (怨み節). When both these songs were used in the 2003 Quentin Tarantino film Kill Bill, there was a revival of interest in Kaji's music that encouraged her to resume her musical career. In 2009, she released a single, Onna wa yametai. In 2011, Kaji released her first new album in 31 years, Aitsu no suki-so-na burūsu (あいつの好きそなブルース) with songs written by Ryudo Uzaki and Yoko Aki.

In May 2020, Kaji launched her own channel on YouTube, as a way to both celebrate her work with fans all over the world, and to give back to everyone who had supported her.

In October 2025, Kaji made her first public appearance in the United States at Beyond Fest. In a panel moderated by Sean Baker, she reflected on her career, fans, and her legacy.

== Filmography ==
=== Films ===
- Retaliation (1968) (credited as Masako Ota)
- Outlaw:Gangster VIP 2 (1968)
- Blind Woman's Curse (June 1970, d. Teruo Ishii)
- Shinjuku Outlaw: Step On the Gas (新宿アウトロー ぶっ飛ばせ, Shinjuku Autorō – Buttobase) (Oct. 1970)
- The Stray Cat Rock series (1970–71)
  - Stray Cat Rock: Delinquent Girl Boss
  - Stray Cat Rock: Wild Jumbo
  - Stray Cat Rock: Sex Hunter
  - Stray Cat Rock: Machine Animal
  - Alleycat Rock: Crazy Riders '71 (野良猫ロック 暴走集団’７１, Nora Neko Rokku: Bōsōshūdan '71) (Jan. 1971, d. Toshiya Fujita)
- The Sasori series (1972–73)
  - Female Prisoner 701: Scorpion
  - Female Convict Scorpion: Jailhouse 41
  - Female Convict Scorpion: Beast Stable
  - Female Prisoner Scorpion: 701's Grudge Song
- The Gincho series (1972)
  - Wandering Ginza Butterfly
  - Wandering Ginza Butterfly 2: She-Cat Gambler
- Battles Without Honor and Humanity: Deadly Fight in Hiroshima (1973)
- Lady Snowblood (1973)
- Lady Snowblood 2: Love Song of Vengeance (1974)
- The Homeless (1974)
- New Battles Without Honor and Humanity: The Boss's Head (1975)
- Lullaby of the Earth (大地の子守唄, Daichi no Komoriuta) (June 1976, d. Yasuzo Masumura)
- Yakuza Graveyard (1976)
- Double Suicide of Sonezaki (1978)
- Tree Without Leaves (1986)
- Onihei Hankachō (1995)
- Oh! Oku (2006)
- Under the Open Sky (2020)
- The Voice of Sin (2020), Mayumi
- What Did You Eat Yesterday? (2021)

=== Television ===
- Ōedo Sōsamō (1970–71), Konami
- Ronin of the Wilderness (1972)
- Sasagawa Saho Matatabi Shirizu – Kuresakatouge e no Chisou (1972), Oshizu
- Terauchi Kantarō Ikka (1974), Shizue Terauchi
- Sorekara no Musashi (1981), Yuri-hime
- Ōoku (1983)
- Kaseifu wa Mita! 2 (1984)
- Aoi Hitomi no Seiraifu (1984)
- Sutaa Tanjō (1985)
- Tantei Kamizu Kyōsuke no Satsujin Suiri 8: Izu Shimoda-kaigan ni Akai Satsui ga Hashiru (1988), Shōko Hamano
- Aoi Sanmyaku '88 (1988), Umetaro
- Onihei Hankachō(1989–2016), Omasa
- Kenkaku Shōbai (1998–2010), Omon
- Kaseifu ha Mita! 21 (2003), Mayumi Hirao
- Anata no Tonari ni Dare ka Iru (2003), Shimako Matsumoto
- Kenkaku Shobai Sukedachi (2004)
- Onihei Hankacho Supesharu: Yamabukiya Okatsu (2005)
- Nogaremono Orin (2006)
- Hasshū Mawari Kuwayama Jūbei (2007)
- Kenkyaku Shobai: Haru no Arashi (2008)
- Kekkon Shinai (2012)
- Joiuchi: Hairyo zuma Shimatsu (2013)
- Taxi Driver no Suiri Nisschi 34 (2013)
- Samurai Rebellion (2013)
- Gokuaku Gambo (2014)
- Joshu Seven (2017)
- What Did You Eat Yesterday? (2019–23)
- Modern Love Tokyo (2022)
- YuYu Hakusho (2023), Genkai

== Discography ==
=== Singles ===
Title (romaji)	Title (Japanese)	Released	Notes
Jingi Komoriuta / Koi ni inochi o	仁義子守唄／恋に命を	July 5, 1970	
Inochi no Namida / Kanashii Egao	命の涙／悲しい笑顔	March 5, 1971	
Hamabe no Meruhen / Ai he no kitai	浜辺のメルヘン／愛への期待	July 5, 1971	
Gincho Wataridori / Gincho Buruusu	銀蝶渡り鳥／銀蝶ブルース	March 5, 1972	Theme song from Wandering Ginza Butterfly
Urami Bushi / Onna no Jumon	怨み節／女の呪文	December 1, 1972	Theme song from Female Convict 701: Scorpion. (Oricon number 6).
Kaji Meiko No Miryoku	梶芽衣子の魅力{A面「さそり」サントラ、B面「銀蝶」サントラ}	December 25, 1972	A-side: theme song from Female Convict 701: Scorpion, B-side: theme song from Wandering Ginza Butterfly
Meiko no Fute-Bushi / Onna Hagure Uta	芽衣子のふて節／おんなはぐれ唄	April 15, 1973	Oricon number 32
Yadokari / Kakioki	やどかり／かきおき	September 1, 1973	
Hagure-Bushi / Kiba no Ballad	はぐれ節／牙のバラード	July 10, 1973	
Shura no Hana / Hoo Yare Ho...	修羅の花／ほおやれほ･････	December 25, 1973	Theme song from Lady Snowblood
Jeans Blues / Ingabana	ジーンズぶるうす／因果花	March 25, 1974	Theme song from Jinzu burusu: Asu naki furaiha
Kono Atarashii Asa ni / Ame no Yoru Anata wa	この新しい朝に／雨の夜あなたは	November 25, 1974	
Meinichi / Akane Kumo	命日／あかね雲	September 21, 1975	
Hoshii Mono Wa / Imasara Nante Shikaranaide Kudasai	欲しいものは／今更叱らないでください～恋文～	February 21, 1977	
Fukurokouji Sanbancho / Nokoribi	袋小路三番町／残り火	September 21, 1977	
Akane Gumo / Motomachi Chanson	あかね雲／元町シャンソン	May 21, 1978	
Banka / Hiyoke Megane	晩夏／陽よけめがね	July 21, 1979	
Shuki No Uta / Aa Ii Osake	酒季の歌／ああ いいお酒	May 21, 1980	
Atsui Sake / Nagasaki wa Ajisai-Moyou no Aishu	熱い酒／長崎はアジサイ模様の哀愁	January 1980	
Kawaita Hana / Kirisame Hotel	乾いた華／霧雨ホテル	December 21, 1984	
Fushigi Ne / Fune Ni Yurarete	不思議ね／舟にゆられて	July 21, 1994	
Onna Wo Yametai / Omoide-Biyori	女をやめたい／思い出日和	June 24, 2009	

=== Albums ===
Title (romaji)	Title (Japanese)	Released	Notes
Gincho Wataridori	銀蝶渡り鳥	July 1, 1972	
Hajiki Shishu	はじき詩集	June 1, 1973	
Orijinaru Besuto 12: Yadokari	やどかり〈オリジナルベスト12〉	October 25, 1973	
Otoko Onna Kokoro No Aika	男・女・こころの哀歌	April 25, 1974	
Golden Star Twin Deluxe	ゴールデンスター・ツイン・デラックス	May 25, 1974	
Sareyo Sareyo Kanashimi No Shirabe	去れよ、去れよ、悲しみの調べ	November 25, 1974	
Kyou No Wagami Wa...	きょうの我が身は･････	December 21, 1975	
Akane Gumo	あかね雲	August 21, 1978	
Wakare Urami Namida Uta	別れ 怨み 涙うた	November 21, 1979	
Shuki No Uta	酒季の歌	October 28, 1980	
Zenkyoku Shu	全曲集	2004	
Meiko Kaji – Best Collection	梶芽衣子ベスト・コレクション	March 24, 2010	
Aitsu No Suki Sona Burusu	あいつの好きそなブルース	May 25, 2011	

== Awards and nominations ==
3rd Hochi Film Award

- Won: Best Actress for The Love Suicides at Sonezaki

75th Mainichi Film Awards

- Won: Kinuyo Tanaka Award for her career
