= Kazuo Kamimura =

Japanese manga artist

Kazuo Kamimura (上村 一夫, Kamimura Kazuo; March 7, 1940 in Yokosuka – January 11, 1986) was a Japanese manga artist born in Yokosuka, Kanagawa. He was best known as the illustrator of Lady Snowblood, which was adapted into film in 1973. Hitoshi Iwaaki, a manga artist was his assistant. He has been called "the ukiyo-e master of Shōwa-era manga."

Kamimura died on January 11, 1986, at age 45, of a pharynx tumor.
