= Alleycat Rock: Female Boss =

1970 film

- Theatrical poster
- Directed by: Yasuharu Hasebe
- Written by: Hideichi Nagahara
- Starring: Akiko Wada; Meiko Kaji
- Cinematography: Muneo Ueda
- Edited by: Akira Suzuki
- Music by: Kunihiko Suzuki
- Production company: Hori Kikaku
- Distributed by: Nikkatsu
- Release date: May 2, 1970
- Running time: 80 minutes
- Country: Japan
- Language: Japanese

Alleycat Rock: Female Boss (女番長野良猫ロック, Onna banchō nora-neko rokku) aka Stray Cat Rock: Delinquent Girl Boss, Female Juvenile Delinquent Leader: Alleycat Rock, Wildcat Rock is a 1970 Japanese outlaw biker film directed by Yasuharu Hasebe and starring Akiko Wada and Meiko Kaji. It is the first entry in the five-film Alleycat Rock or Stray Cat Rock series and was followed by Stray Cat Rock: Wild Jumbo, Stray Cat Rock: Sex Hunter, Stray Cat Rock: Machine Animal and Alleycat Rock: Crazy Riders '71.

== Plot ==
Tough girl biker Ako (pop singer Akiko Wada) comes across Mei (Meiko Kaji) and her girl gang (the Alleycats/Stray Cats) as they are about to have a knife fight in Shinjuku, Tokyo with another gang of girls. When the second gang calls in their boyfriends for help, Ako joins in and turns the tide for Mei and her gang and becomes a leader figure for the girls. Meanwhile, Mei's boyfriend Michio (Kōji Wada) wants to join some right-wing nationalists, the Seiyu Group. To prove himself, he induces an old friend Kelly (Ken Sanders) to throw a boxing match so the Seiyu Group can cash in betting against him. But when the boxer, encouraged by Ako and Mei, wins the fight, the Seiyu Group takes their anger out on Michio until Mei and the Alleycats rescue him. But Mei and the girls are now on the run from the powerful group. Michio and Mei are eventually killed and Ako leaves Shinjuku, roaring away on her bike.

== Cast ==
- Akiko Wada as Ako
- Meiko Kaji as Mei
- Kōji Wada as Michio Yagami
- Bunjaku Han as Yuriko
- Yuka Kemari (久万里由香) as Mari
- Hanako Tokachi (十勝花子) as Hanako
- Yūko Shimazu (島津ゆう子) as Yūko
- Yuka Ōhashi (大橋由香) as Yuka
- Miki Yanagi (柳美樹) as Miki
- Toshimitsu Shima (島敏光 as Maabō
- George Fujita (富田ジョージ) as Hiroshi
- Ken Sanders (ケン・サンダース) as Kelly Fujiyama
- Gorō Mutsumi as Hanada
- Tatsuya Fuji as Katsuya
- Yōsui Inoue (as Andre Candre) (アンドレ・カンドレ)

== Production ==
Alleycat Rock: Female Boss was designed by Nikkatsu to compete with Toei's Delinquent Boss series, which, in turn, had been inspired by Roger Corman's early outlaw biker film, The Wild Angels (1966). Nikkatsu also meant the film to showcase the popular singer Akiko Wada, and to appeal to her young audience. Co-star Meiko Kaji, however, attracted the most audience attention, and she became the star of the remaining episodes in the Alleycat Rock series. Nikkatsu regarded Alleycat Rock: Female Boss as a prototype for a new direction for the studio and its success ensured the studio's move towards youth-oriented action films.

Director Hasebe and cult screenwriter-director Atsushi Yamatoya wrote the script to Alleycat Rock: Female Boss. Because of the film's low budget, the studio gave Hasebe and Yamatoya more creative freedom than was generally the case for Nikkatsu's staff at this time. Of the distinctive look of Alleycat Rock: Female Boss, Hasebe recalled, "I tried to infuse those movies with the culture of the time. I spent a lot of time visiting places where people hung out. At the time, protest songs were popular, so I included them in the soundtrack. I remember, one day I noticed a big fuss near the west entrance of Shinjuku station. Activists were gathering and protesting against the US-Japanese Security Treaty. These people were like the hippies in the States. I found them interesting. Cinematic. I wanted my film to be this modern."

== Reception ==
The Weissers, in their Japanese Cinema Encyclopedia: The Sex Films, judge Alleycat Rock: Female Boss to be better than Toei's Delinquent Boss series, with which it was meant to compete, and call the series, "a prime example of sexually oriented-action movies, five excellent entries over a two year period". The style of the series, according to the Weissers, is "Ultra-chic, yet surprisingly grim". Allmovie writes that Alleycat Rock: Female Boss is "Good-looking and fast-paced".

== Home media ==
Alleycat Rock: Female Boss was released theatrically in Japan on May 2, 1970. It was released on DVD on December 8, 2006.

== Bibliography ==
=== English ===
- Hasebe, Yasuharu. (1998). Interviewed by Thomas and Yuko Mihara Weisser in Tokyo, 1999, in Asian Cult Cinema, #25, 4th Quarter, 1999, p. 32-42.
- "NORANEKO ROKKU: ONNA BANCHO". Complete Index to World Film.
- Alleycat Rock: Female Boss at IMDb
- Weisser, Thomas; Yuko Mihara Weisser (1998). Japanese Cinema Encyclopedia: The Sex Films. Miami: Vital Books : Asian Cult Cinema Publications. pp. 40–42. ISBN 1-889288-52-7.

=== Japanese ===
- 女番長 野良猫ロック(1970) (in Japanese). allcinema.net.
- 女番長 野良猫ロック (in Japanese). Japanese Cinema Database (Agency for Cultural Affairs). Archived from the original on 2011-10-08.
- 女番長野良猫ロック (in Japanese). Japanese Movie Database.
- 女番長 野良猫ロック(邦画 ) (in Japanese). Kinema Junpo. Archived from the original on 2012-03-24.
- 女番長 野良猫ロック. www.nikkatsu.com (in Japanese). Archived from the original on 30 January 2010.
