= Takeo Kimura filmography =

Filmography

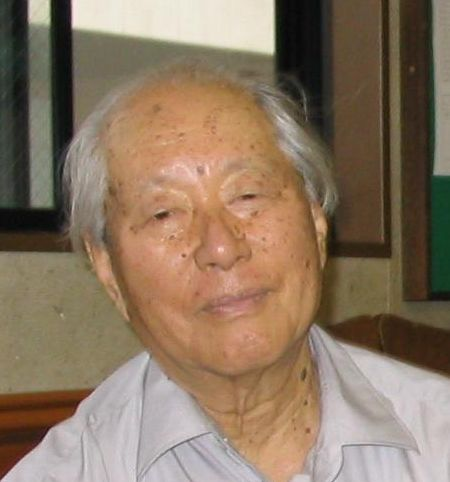
Takeo Kimura in 2007

The following is the filmography of Takeo Kimura, the Japanese art director, writer, and film director who has art-directed more than 200 films over a span of more than six decades and ranks among Japan's best-known art directors. His training began with the Nikkatsu Company in 1941, whose production division was merged into Daiei during the wartime industry reorganization, where he was promoted to art director in 1945. His debut film as such was Umi no yobu koe (1945). Nikkatsu re-opened its production studio in 1954 and Kimura moved there. He worked with several directors, including top action director Toshio Masuda on films such as Red Quay (1958) with top star Yujiro Ishihara and Gangster VIP (1968) starring Tetsuya Watari. However, his longest and most famous collaboration has been with director Seijun Suzuki, which began with The Bastard (1963). Together they developed a bold, expressive style exemplified in Gate of Flesh (1964) and Tokyo Drifter (1966). Suzuki often rewrote his scripts with Kimura, who was given his first screenwriting credit on The Flower and the Angry Waves (1964). Kimura was also a part of Guryū Hachirō, the pen name of the writing group that formed around Suzuki in the mid-1960s and wrote Branded to Kill (1967).

Kimura left Nikkatsu in 1973 to work freelance. He subsequently art-directed many films for director Kei Kumai over almost 20 years. This included Kumai's best-known film Sandakan No. 8 (1974), Love and Faith (1978) featuring Toshirō Mifune and The Sea Is Watching (2002) based on one of Akira Kurosawa's final scripts. Kimura's collaboration with director Kazuo Kuroki exceeded 20 years, including the Art Theatre Guild film Preparation for the Festival (1975) and The Face of Jizo (2004). He worked with Suzuki on several more films, including Zigeunerweisen (1980) and Pistol Opera (2001), a follow-up to Branded to Kill. Zigeunerweisen was voted best Japanese film of the 1980s by Japanese film critics. He art-directed on Fire Festival and Tampopo (both 1985), career highlights in the respective oeuvres of directors Mitsuo Yanagimachi and Juzo Itami. Kaizō Hayashi's best remembered and debut film To Sleep so as to Dream (1986) marked the beginning of another long collaboration which also encompassed his Maiku Hama trilogy: The Most Terrible Time in My Life (1994), Stairway to the Distant Past (1995) and The Trap (1996).

At age 86 Kimura directed the first of four short films with Mugen Sasurai (2004), which earned him the title for oldest directorial debut. The last was Matouqin Nocturne (2007) in which Suzuki appeared in a prominent role. Kimura then wrote and directed the feature-length film Dreaming Awake (2008) based on his own self-published novel. He was recognized by Guinness World Records for "the oldest debut as a feature film director" at age 90. Suzuki again appeared in the film. Kimura himself acted in a couple small roles for other directors.

== Filmography ==
=== Art director ===
Year	Title	Japanese	Romanization	Director
==== 1940s ====
1942	Path to the Mountain Shrine^{[H]}	山参道	Yama sandō	Kōji Shima
1943	The Tiger of Malaya^{[H]}	マライの虎	Marai no tora	Masato Koga
1943	You Shall Marry^{[H]}	結婚命令	Kekkon meirei	Isao Numanami
1945	Umi no yobu koe	海を呼ぶ声	Umi no yobu koe	Masanori Igayama
1946	A Brilliant Revenge	絢爛たる復讐	Kenrantaru fukushū	Eiichi Koishi; Ren Yoshimura
1946	Nusumare kaketa ongakukai	盗まれかけた音楽会	Nusumare kaketa ongakukai	Seiji Hisamatsu
1947	Yakō ressha no onna	夜行列車の女	Yakō ressha no onna	Shigeo Tanaka
1948	Orion seiza	オリオン星座	Orion seiza	Satoshi Taguchi
1948	Oyabaka taishō	親馬鹿大将	Oyabaka taishō	Masahisa Sunohara
1948	Yoru no platform	夜のプラットホーム	Yoru no purattohōmu	Satoshi Taguchi
1948	Jyōnetsu no ningyo	情熱の人魚	Jyōnetsu no ningyo	Satoshi Taguchi
1949	Kenji to onna kanju	検事と女看守	Kenji to onna kanju	Ren Yoshimura
1949	Bibō no kaoyaku	美貌の顔役	Bibō no kaoyaku	Ren Yoshimura
1949	Daitokai no ushimitsudoki	大都会の丑満時	Daitokai no ushimitsudoki	Motō Nishimura
1949	Namida no minato	涙の港	Namida no minato	Masahisa Sunohara
1949	Uta no myōjō	歌の明星	Uta no myōjō	Kōzō Saeki
==== 1950s ====
1950	Ippikiōkami	一匹狼	Ippikiōkami	Eiichi Koishi
1950	Watashi wa nerawarete iru	私は狙われている	Watashi wa nerawarete iru	Kazuo Mori
1950	Kumo no machi	蜘蛛の街	Kumo no machi	Hideo Suzuki
1950	Gozen reiji no shutsugoku	午前零時の出獄	Gozen reiji no shutsugoku	Eiichi Koishi
1950	San akunin to akanbō	三悪人と赤ん坊	San akunin to akanbō	Eiichi Koishi
1951	Koi no orandazaka	恋の阿蘭蛇坂	Koi no orandazaka	Hideo Suzuki
1951	Saijyōke no kyōen	西城家の饗宴	Saijyōke no kyōen	Hideo Suzuki
1951	Utau yakyū kozō	歌う野球小僧	Utau yakyū kozō	Kunio Watanabe
1951	Honō no hada	炎の肌	Honō no hada	Seiji Hisamatsu
1952	The Red Group of Asakusa	浅草紅団	Asakusa kurenai dan	Seiji Hisamatsu
1952	Iki nokotta Bentensama	生き残った弁天様	Iki nokotta Bentensama	Seiji Hisamatsu
1952	Mōjū tsukai no shōjo	猛獣使いの少女	Mōjū tsukai no shōjo	Kōzō Saeki
1952	Futatsu no shojosen	二つの処女線	Futatsu no shojosen	Seiji Hisamatsu
1952	Tomorrow Is Sunday	明日は日曜日	Asu wa nichiyōbi	Kōzō Saeki
1953	Gendai shojo	現代処女	Gendai shojo	Kōzō Saeki
1953	Hahanami	母波	Hahanami	Eiichi Koishi
1953	The Mistress	雁	Gan	Shirō Toyoda
1953	Asakusa monogatari	浅草物語	Asakusa monogatari	Kōji Shima
1953	Beni tsubaki	紅椿	Beni tsubaki	Ren Yoshimura
1953	Jūdai no yūwaku	十代の誘惑	Jūdai no yūwaku	Seiji Hisamatsu
1954	A Certain Woman	或る女	Aru onna	Shirō Toyoda
1954	The Story of Shunkin	春琴物語	Shunkin monogatari	Ito Daisuke
1954	Black Tide	黒い潮	Kuroi shio	Sō Yamamura
1955	Moonrise	月は上りぬ	Tsuki wa noborime	Kinuyo Tanaka
1955	Prince Surabaya	スラバヤ殿下	Surabaya denka	Takeshi Satō
1955	Diary of a Policeman	警察日記	Keisatsu nikki	Seiji Hisamatsu
1955	Mother	おふくろ	Ofukuro	Seiji Hisamatsu
1955	Beyond the Green	緑はるかに	Midori haruka ni	Umetsugu Inoue
1955	Our Grandma	うちのおばあちゃん	Uchi no obaachan	Masahisa Sunohara
1955	The Maid's Kid	女中ッ子	Jochūkko	Tomotaka Tasaka
1955	Sentenced to Death	少年死刑囚	Shōnen shikeishū	Ren Yoshimura
1955	Good Neighbours	月夜の傘	Tsukiyo no kasa	Seiji Hisamatsu
1955	A Hole of My Own Making	自分の穴の中で	Jibun no ana no naka de	Tomu Uchida
1955	Diary of a Policeman Continued	続・警察日記	Zoku keisatsu nikki	Seiji Hisamatsu
1956	Jazz Parade	裏町のお転婆娘	Uramachi no otenba musume	Umetsugu Inoue
1956	Cell No. 8	第８監房	Dai hachi kanbō	Yutaka Abe
1956	The Crime of Shirō Kamisaka	神阪四郎の犯罪	Kamisaka Shirō no hanzai	Seiji Hisamatsu
1956	Confession	色ざんげ	Irozange	Yutaka Abe
1956	Mixed Family	雑居家族	Zakkyo kazoku	Seiji Hisamatsu
1956	I'm All Alone: Third Part	続ただひとりの人	Zoku tada hitori no hito	Ren Yoshimura
1956	Drumbeat	ドラムと恋と夢	Doramu to koi to yume	Ren Yoshimura
1956	Tonari no yome	隣の嫁	Tonari no yome	Kiyoshi Horiike
1956	Nikutai no mitsuyu	肉体の密輸	Nikutai no mitsuyu	Yutaka Abe
1956	The Baby Carriage	乳母車	Ubaguruma	Tomotaka Tasaka
1957	Saigo no totsugeki	最後の突撃	Saigo no totsugeki	Yutaka Abe
1957	Joshiryōsai	女子寮祭	Joshiryōsai	Buichi Saitō
1957	Watashi wa zankamono de aru	私は前科者である	Watashi wa zankamono de aru	Takumi Furukawa
1957	A Jazz Singer Is Born	ジャズ娘誕生	Jazu musume tanjō	Masahisa Sunohara
1957	Madame	マダム	Madamu	Yutaka Abe
1957	This Day's Life	今日のいのち	Kyō no inochi	Tomotaka Tasaka
1957	Dangerous Age	危険な年齢	Kiken na nenrei	Kiyoshi Horiike
1957	Condemned	九人の死刑囚	Kunin no shikeishū	Takumi Furukawa
1957	The Awakening	雌花	Mebana	Yutaka Abe
1958	Story of a Nun	春泥尼	Shundeini	Yutaka Abe
1958	A Man in the Fog	霧の中の男	Kiri no naka no otoko	Koreyoshi Kurahara
1958	A Slope in the Sun	陽のあたる坂道	Hi no ataru sakamichi	Tomotaka Tasaka
1958	The Face of Death	死の壁の脱出	Shi no kabe no dasshutsu	Eisuke Takizawa
1958	Yarō to ōgon	野郎と黄金	Yarō to ōgon	Yōichi Ushihara
1958	The Flow	運河	Unga	Yutaka Abe
1958	Red Quay	赤い波止場	Akai hatoba	Toshio Masuda
1958	Showdown in the Storm	嵐の中を突っ走れ	Arashi no naka o tsuppashire	Koreyoshi Kurahara
1958	Kemono no iru machi	獣のいる街	Kemono no iru machi	Takumi Furukawa
1959	The Stream of Youth	若い川の流れ	Wakai kawa no nagare	Tomotaka Tasaka
1959	Mi imada aoshi	実いまだ青し	Mi imada aoshi	Yōichi Ushihara
1959	Kamen no onna	仮面の女	Kamen no onna	Yutaka Abe
1959	Tōbōsha	逃亡者	Tōbōsha	Takumi Furukawa
1959	Nirenjū no tetsu	二連銃の鉄	Nirenjū no tetsu	Yutaka Abe
1959	The Echo of Love	山と谷と雲	Yama to tani to kumo	Yōichi Ushihara
1959	Umi wa kurutte iru	海は狂っている	Umi wa kurutte iru	Takumi Furukawa
1959	Dynamite ni hi o tsukero	爆薬に火をつけろ	Dainamaito ni hi o tsukero	Koreyoshi Kurahara
1959	Dream a Young Man's Dream	男なら夢を見ろ	Otoko nara yume o miro	Yōichi Ushihara
1959	Uwaki no kisetsu	浮気の季節	Uwaki no kisetsu	Yutaka Abe
1959	Iwojima	硫黄島	Iōjima	Jūkichi Uno
1959	Daigaku no abarenbō	大学の暴れん坊	Daigaku no abarenbō	Takumi Furukawa
==== 1960s ====
1960	The Cards Will Tell	鉄火場の風	Tekkaba no kaze	Yōichi Ushihara
1960	Girls Without Return Tickets	俺は欺されない	Ore wa damasarenai	Takumi Furukawa
1960	Duel of Akiba	打倒	Nokku daun	Akinori Matsuo
1960	Volcano Wind	海を渡る波止場の風	Umi o wataru hatoba no kaze	Tokujirō Yamazaki
1960	Mutekiga Ore o Yondeiru	霧笛が俺を呼んでいる	Muteki ga ore o yondeiru	Tokujirō Yamazaki
1960	The Reformer	やくざ先生	Yakuza sensei	Akinori Matsuo
1960	Man at the Bullfight	闘牛に賭ける男	Tōgyū ni kakeru otoko	Toshio Masuda
1961	He Killed Dad	俺の血が騒ぐ	Ore no chi ga sawagu	Tokujirō Yamazaki
1961	Crimson Pistol	紅の拳銃	Kurenai no kenjū	Yōichi Ushihara
1961	Tugboat Gunman	大暴れマドロス野郎	Ōabare madorosu yarō	Tokujirō Yamazaki
1961	Rambling in the Wind	風に逆らう流れ者	Kaze ni sakarau nagaremono	Tokujirō Yamazaki
1961	Tokai no sora no hijōsen	都会の空の非常線	Tokai no sora no hijōsen	Takashi Nomura
1961	Gunmen's Alley	拳銃横丁	Kenjū yokochō	Tokujirō Yamazaki
1961	Daishinrin ni mukatte tatsu	大森林に向って立つ	Daishinrin ni mukatte tatsu	Takashi Nomura
1961	The Jet That Flew Into the Storm	嵐を突っ切るジェット機	Arashi o tsukkiru jettoki	Koreyoshi Kurahara
1961	The Black Scar	黒い傷あとのブルース	Kuroi kizuato no burūsu	Takashi Nomura
1962	Aniki	兄貴	Aniki	Tokujirō Yamazaki
1962	Walk with Your Chin Up	上を向いて歩こう	Ue o muite arukō	Toshio Masuda
1962	Facing the Clouds	雲に向かって起つ	Kumo ni mukatte tatsu	Eisuke Takizawa
1962	Dahil Sa Iyo: The Song of Sad Love	遥かなる国の歌	Harukanaru kuni no uta	Takashi Nomura
1962	The Rambler Returns Home	渡り鳥故郷へ帰る	Wataridori kokyō e kaeru	Yōichi Ushihara
1962	Glass Johnny: Looks Like a Beast	硝子のジョニー 野獣のように見えて	Garasu no Jonī: Yajū no yōni miete	Koreyoshi Kurahara
1963	Umi no taka	海の鷹	Umi no taka	Takumi Furukawa
1963	Full of Hope	いつでも夢を	Itsu demo yume o	Takashi Nomura
1963	Akumyō takaki rokudenashi	悪名高きろくでなし	Akumyō takaki rokudenashi	Buichi Saitō
1963	Gozen reiji no shutsugoku	午前零時の出獄	Gozen reiji no shutsugoku	Tokujirō Yamazaki
1963	Foggy Night Blues	夜霧のブルース	Yogiri no burūsu	Takashi Nomura
1963	Alibi	アリバイ	Aribai	Yōichi Ushihara
1963	The Bastard	悪太郎	Akutarō	Seijun Suzuki
1963	Kanto Wanderer	関東無宿	Kantō mushuku	Seijun Suzuki
1964	The Flower and the Angry Waves	花と怒涛	Hana to dotō	Seijun Suzuki
1964	Sunset Hill	夕陽の丘	Yūhi no oka	Akinori Matsuo
1964	Gate of Flesh	肉体の門	Nikutai no mon	Seijun Suzuki
1964	Our Blood Will Not Forgive	俺たちの血が許さない	Oretachi no chi ga yurusanai	Seijun Suzuki
1965	Story of a Prostitute	春婦伝	Shunpu den	Seijun Suzuki
1965	Ochiba no honō	落葉の炎	Ochiba no honō	Masuo Maeda
1965	Stories of Bastards: Born Under a Bad Star	悪太郎伝 悪い星の下でも	Akutarō den: Warui hoshi no shita demo	Seijun Suzuki
1965	Three Stray Dogs	三匹の野良犬	Sanbiki no nora inu	Yōichi Ushihara
1965	Kaitō X: Kubi no nai otoko	怪盗Ｘ 首のない男	Kaitō ekkusu: Kubi no nai otoko	Isamu Kosugi
1965	Tattooed Life	刺青一代	Irezumi ichidai	Seijun Suzuki
1965	Four Loves	四つの恋の物語	Yottsu no koi no monogatari	Katsumi Nishikawa
1966	Carmen of Kawachi	河内カルメン	Kawachi Karumen	Seijun Suzuki
1966	Tokyo Drifter	東京流れ者	Tōkyō nagaremono	Seijun Suzuki
1966	Kill the Night Rose	夜のバラを消せ	Yoru no bara o kese	Toshio Masuda
1966	Fighting Elegy	けんかえれじい	Kenka erejii	Seijun Suzuki
1966	Oyuki	おゆきさん	Oyukisan	Noboru Kaji
1967	Ginza for Two of Us	二人の銀座	Futari no Ginza	Noboru Kaji
1967	The Storm Comes and Goes	嵐来たり去る	Arashi kitari saru	Toshio Masuda
1967	Friendly Enemies	対決	Taiketsu	Toshio Masuda
1967	Slaughter Gun	みな殺しの拳銃	Minagoroshi no kenjū	Yasuharu Hasebe
1967	Velvet Hustler	紅の流れ星	Kurenai no Nagareboshi	Toshio Masuda
1967	The Endless Duel	血斗	Kettō	Toshio Masuda
1968	Gangster VIP	無頼より 大幹部	Burai yori: Daikanbu	Toshio Masuda
1968	Big Boss: Outlaw	大幹部 無頼	Daikanbu: Murai	Keiichi Ozawa
1968	Story of My Life	わが命の唄 艶歌	Waga inochi no uta: Enka	Toshio Masuda
1968	Stormy Era	昭和のいのち	Shōwa no inochi	Toshio Masuda
1968	Ah, Tower of Lillies	あゝひめゆりの塔	Aa himeyuri no tō	Toshio Masuda
1969	Exiled to Hell	地獄の破門状	Jigoku no hamonjō	Toshio Masuda
1969	Savage Wolf Pack	野獣を消せ	Yajū o kese	Yasuharu Hasebe
1969	The Friendly Killer	昇り竜鉄火肌	Noboriryū tekkahada	Teruo Ishii
1969	Zenka: Dosu arashi	前科・ドス嵐	Zenka: Dosu arashi	Keiichi Ozawa
1969	Big Boss: Attack!	大幹部 殴り込み	Daikanbu: Nagurikomi	Toshio Masuda
1969	Chivalrous Flower's Life Story: Gambling Heir	侠花列伝 襲名賭博	Kyōka retsuden: Shūmei toba	Keiichi Ozawa
1969	The Cleanup	嵐の勇者たち	Arashi no yūshatachi	Toshio Masuda
==== 1970s ====
1970	Profile of a Boss' Son	やくざの横顔	Yakuza no yokogao	Keiichi Ozawa
1970	Swirling Butterflies	女の警察 乱れ蝶	Onna no keisatsu: Midare chō	Keiichi Ozawa
1970	Pay off Your Debt!	大幹部 ケリをつけろ	Daikanbu: Keri o tsukeru	Keiichi Ozawa
1971	Kanto Exile	関東破門状	Kantō hamonjō	Keiichi Ozawa
1971	Bad Girl Mako	不良少女魔子	Furyō shōjo Mako	Koreyoshi Kurahara
1972	The Long Darkness	忍ぶ川	Shinobugawa	Kei Kumai
1973	The Black Rain of Sayama	狭山の黒い雨	Sayama no kuroi ame	Hisashi Sudō
1974	Karafuto 1945nen natsu: Hyōsatsu no mon	樺太１９４５年夏 氷雪の門	Karafuto sen kyūhyaku yonjū gonen natsu: Hyōsatsu no mon	Mitsuo Murayama
1974	Sandakan No. 8	サンダカン八番娼館 望郷	Sandakan hachiban shōkan: Bōkyō	Kei Kumai
1975	Days of My Youth	わが青春のとき	Waga seishun no toki	Tokihisa Morikawa
1975	Preparation for the Festival	祭りの準備	Matsuri no junbi	Kazuo Kuroki
1976	Cape of the North	北の岬	Kita no misaki	Kei Kumai
1976	Zōka no hanketsu	造花の判決	Zōka no hanketsu	Meijirō Umetsu
1976	The Youth Killer	青春の殺人者	Seishun no satsujin sha	Kazuhiko Hasegawa
1977	Barefoot Gen: Explosion of Tears	はだしのゲン 涙の爆発	Hadashi no Gen: Namida no bakuhatsu	Tengo Yamada
1977	The Sky Where Haruo Flew	春男の翔んだ空	Haruo no tonda sora	Tengo Yamada
1978	Ogin-sama	お吟さま	Oginsama	Kei Kumai
1979	Myōgamura kenbunki	茗荷村見聞記	Myōgamura kenbunki	Tengo Yamada
==== 1980s ====
1980	An Ocean to Cross	天平の甍	Tenpyō no iraka	Kei Kumai
1980	Zigeunerweisen	ツィゴイネルワイゼン	Tsigoineruwaizen	Seijun Suzuki
1980	Barefoot Gen: Battle of Hiroshima	はだしのゲン ＰＡＲＴ３ ヒロシマのたたかい	Hadashi no Gen pāto surī: Hiroshima no tatakai	Tengo Yamada
1980	A Long Way for a Motor Car	遥かなる走路	Harukanaru sōro	Junya Satō
1980	The Woman	ザ・ウーマン	Za ūman	Yoichi Takabayashi
1981	Toshishun^{[F]}	杜子春	Toshishun	Takeichi Saitō
1981	Kiyoshi Yamashita: Wandering Artist	裸の大将放浪記 山下清物語	Hadaka no taishō hōrōki: Yamashita Kiyoshi monogatari	Tengo Yamada
1981	Willful Murder	日本の熱い日々 謀殺・下山事件	Nihon no atsui hibi bōsatsu: Shimoyama jiken	Kei Kumai
1982	The Go Masters	未完の対局	Mikan no taikyoku	Junya Satō; Ji-shun Duan
1982	Yukko no okurimono: Cosmos no yō ni	ユッコの贈りもの コスモスのように	Yukko no okurimono: Kosumosu no yō ni	Tengo Yamada
1983	Rope and Breasts	縄と乳房	Nawa to chibusa	Masaru Konuma
1983	The Bridge of Tears	泪橋	Namidabashi	Kazuo Kuroki
1983	Sexual Crime	性的犯罪	Seiteki hanzai	Yōichi Sai
1985	Capone's Flood of Tears	カポネ大いに泣く	Kapone ōi ni naku	Seijun Suzuki
1985	Fire Festival	火まつり	Himatsuri	Mitsuo Yanagimachi
1985	Shiroi machi Hiroshima	白い町ヒロシマ	Shiroi machi Hiroshima	Tengo Yamada
1985	Tampopo	タンポポ	Tanpopo	Juzo Itami
1986	To Sleep so as to Dream	夢みるように眠りたい	Yume miru yō ni nemuritai	Kaizō Hayashi
1986	The Endless Sea	波光きらめく果て	Hakō kirameku hate	Toshiya Fujita
1986	Ghost Hero	妖怪天国	Yōkai tengoku	Macoto Tezka
1986	The Sea and Poison	海と毒薬	Umi to dokuyaku	Kei Kumai
1986	House of Wedlock	ウホッホ探険隊	Uhohho tankentai	Kichitarō Negishi
1987	Shinran: Path to Purity	親鸞 白い道	Shinran: Shiroi michi	Rentarō Mikuni
1988	Tokyo: The Last Megalopolis^{[A]}	帝都物語	Teito monogatari	Akio Jissōji
1988	Before the Dawn: Toyohiko Kagawa Story^{[A]}	死線を越えて 賀川豊彦物語	Shisen o koete: Kagawa Toyohiko monogatari	Tengo Yamada
1988	Dogura Magura	ドグラ・マグラ	Dogura magura	Toshio Matsumoto
1989	The Death of a Tea Master	千利休 本覺坊遺文	Sen no Rikyū: Honkakubō ibun	Kei Kumai
1989	Circus Boys	二十世紀少年読本	Nijūsseiki shōnen dokuhon	Kaizō Hayashi
==== 1990s ====
1990	Zipang	ＺＩＰＡＮＧ	Jipangu	Kaizō Hayashi
1990	Hong Kong Paradise^{[A]}	香港パラダイス	Honkon paradaisu	Shūsuke Kaneko
1990	Childhood Days	少年時代	Shōnen jidai	Masahiro Shinoda
1990	Mt. Aso's Passions	式部物語	Shikibu monogatari	Kei Kumai
1991	Figaro Story	フィガロ・ストーリー	Figaro sutōrī	Kaizō Hayashi; Alejandro Agresti; Claire Denis
1991	Fuzakero!	ふざけろ！	Fuzakero!	Chōta Tamagawa
1991	Gekisō trucker densetsu	激走トラッカー伝説	Gekisō torakkā densetsu	Tatsuoki Hosono
1991	Mandala	曼荼羅 若き日の弘法大師・空海	Mandara: Wakaki hi no Kōbō Daishi Kūkai	Teng Wenji
1992	Luminous Moss	ひかりごけ	Hikarigoke	Kei Kumai
1993	About Love, Tokyo	愛について、東京	Ai ni tsuite, Tōkyō	Mitsuo Yanagimachi
1993	Yearning	夢の女	Yume no Onna	Bandō Tamasaburō
1994	The Most Terrible Time in My Life^{[B]}	我が人生最悪の時	Waga jinsei saiaku no toki	Kaizō Hayashi
1994	The Terrifying Revelations of Nostradamus^{[B]}	ノストラダムス 戦慄の啓示	Nosutoradamusu: senritsu no keiji	Yumiko Awaya
1994	A Dedicated Life^{[D]}	全身小説家	Zenjin shōsetsuka	Kazuo Hara
1995	Stairway to the Distant Past^{[B]}	遥かな時代の階段を	Haruka na jidai no kaidan o	Kaizō Hayashi
1995	Deep River	深い河	Fukai kawa	Kei Kumai
1995	How Old Is the River?^{[A]}	冬の河童	Fuyu no kappa	Shiori Kazama
1996	The Trap^{[A]}	罠	Wana	Kaizō Hayashi
1996	The Breath^{[A]}	海ほおずき	Umihoozuki	Kaizō Hayashi
1996	Musashi^{[A]}	ＭＵＳＡＳＨＩ 外伝 ヤングムサシの秘密に迫る	Musashi gaiden: Yangu Musashi no himitsu ni semaru	Shō Nobushi
1997	Cat's Eye^{[A]}	ＣＡＴ’Ｓ ＥＹＥ	Kyattsu ai	Kaizō Hayashi
1997	To Love	愛する	Aisuru	Kei Kumai
==== 2000s ====
2000	"Crimson Pistol" Forever^{[A]}	「紅の拳銃」よ永遠に	"Kurenai no kenjū" yo eien ni	Oikawa Yoshihiro
2000	Pickpocket	スリ	Suri	Kazuo Kuroki
2001	Siberian Express 2^{[A]}	シベリア超特急２	Shiberia chōtokkyū tsū	Mike Mizno
2001	Darkness in the Light	日本の黒い夏 冤罪	Nippon no kuroi natsu: Enzai	Kei Kumai
2001	Closed Ward^{[A]}	いのちの海	Inochi no umi	Susumu Fukuhara
2001	Pistol Opera^{[A]}	ピストルオペラ	Pisutoru opera	Seijun Suzuki
2002	The Sea Is Watching	海は見ていた	Umi wa mite ita	Kei Kumai
2003	Siberian Express 3^{[A]}	シベリア超特急３	Shiberia chōtokkyū surī	Mike Mizno
2003	The Soul Odyssey^{[A]}	蒸発旅日記	Jōhatsu tabinikki	Isao Yamada
2004	Mugen Sasurai^{[C]}	夢幻彷徨 ＭＵＧＥＮ－ＳＡＳＵＲＡＩ	Mugenhōgō: Mugen-sasurai	Takeo Kimura
2004	The Face of Jizo^{[A]}	父と暮せば	Chichi to kuraseba	Kazuo Kuroki
2004	Thank You, Daddy Ishii^{[A]}	石井のおとうさんありがとう 石井十次の生涯	Ishii no otōsan arigatō: Ishii Jūji no shōkai	Hisako Yamada
2005	Siberian Express 5	シベリア超特急５	Shiberia chōtokkyū faibu	Mike Mizno
2005	Princess Raccoon^{[E]}	オペレッタ狸御殿	Operetta tanuki goten	Seijun Suzuki
2005	Portrait of the Wind^{[A]}	誰がために	Taga tameni	Hirō Hyūgaji
2006	Banished^{[B]}	るにん	Runin	Eiji Okuda
2006	Guts densetsu: Itoshi no pit bull^{[A]}	ガッツ伝説 愛しのピット・ブル	Gattsu densetsu: Itoshi no pitto buru	Shō Nobushi
2006	The Youth of Etsuko Kamiya^{[A]}	紙屋悦子の青春	Kamiya Etsuko no seishun	Kazuo Kuroki
2006	Faces of a Fig Tree^{[A]}	無花果の顔	Ichijiku no kao	Kaori Momoi
2007	Fudeko, Her Love & the Angel's Piano^{[A]}	筆子・その愛 天使のピアノ	Fudeko sono ai: Tenshi no piano	Hisako Yamada
2007	Matouqin Nocturne^{[C]}	馬頭琴夜想曲	Batōkin yasōkyoku	Takeo Kimura
2008	Don't Laugh at My Romance^{[A]}	人のセックスを笑うな	Hito no sekkusu o warauna	Nami Iguchi
2008	Tokyo daikūshū^{[G]}	東京大空襲	Tōkyō daikūshū	Kayoko Ebina
2008	Grave of the Fireflies^{[B]}	火垂るの墓	Hotaru no haka	Hirō Hyūgaji
2008	Serial Dad^{[A]}	小森生活向上クラブ	Komori seikatsu kōjō kurabu	Ikki Katashima
2009	The Clone Returns Home^{[B]}	クローンは故郷をめざす	Kurōn wa kokyō o mezasu	Kaji Nakajima
All credits are attributed as "art" unless otherwise noted. A. Art director B. Art supervisor C. Art consultant D. Image design E. Production design F. Art researcher G. Art producer H. Art assistant

=== Director ===
Year	Title	Japanese	Romanization
2004	Mugen Sasurai	夢幻彷徨 ＭＵＧＥＮ－ＳＡＳＵＲＡＩ	Mugenhōgō: Mugen-sasurai
2006	Old Salmon	ＯＬＤ ＳＡＬＭＯＮ 海をみつめて過ぎた時間	Ōrudo sāmon: Umi o mitsumete sugita jikan
2007	Michi	街	Michi
2007	Matouqin Nocturne	馬頭琴夜想曲	Batōkin yasōkyoku
2008	Dreaming Awake	夢のまにまに	Yume no mani mani
2009	The Golden Flower	黄金花	Ôgonka: Hisureba hana, shisureba chô

=== Writer ===
Year	Title	Japanese	Romanization	Director
1964	The Flower and the Angry Waves	花と怒涛	Hana to dotō	Seijun Suzuki
1967	Branded to Kill^{[I]}	殺しの烙印	Koroshi no rakuin	Seijun Suzuki
1985	Capone's Flood of Tears	カポネ大いに泣く	Kapone ōi ni naku	Seijun Suzuki
2006	Old Salmon^{[J]}	ＯＬＤ ＳＡＬＭＯＮ 海をみつめて過ぎた時間	Ōrudo sāmon: Umi o mitsumete sugita jikan	Takeo Kimura
2007	Matouqin Nocturne^{[J]}	馬頭琴夜想曲	Batōkin yasōkyoku	Takeo Kimura
2008	Dreaming Awake^{[K]}	夢のまにまに	Yume no mani mani	Takeo Kimura
All credits are attributed as screenwriter unless otherwise noted. I. Credited under joint pen name Hachirō Guryū J. Original concept K. Also original novel

=== Actor ===
Year	Title	Japanese	Romanization	Role	Director
1977	The Sky Where Haruo Flew	春男の翔んだ空	Haruo no tonda sora	Chef	Tengo Yamada
1992	I've Heard the Ammonite Murmur	アンモナイトのささやきを聞いた	Anmonaito no sasayaki o kiita	Professor	Isao Yamada
