= Seijun Suzuki filmography =

This is an incomplete filmography of Seijun Suzuki.

== Film work as director ==
Year	Title	Japanese	Romanization
1956	Victory Is Mine	港の乾杯 勝利をわが手に	Minato no kanpei: Shori o wagate ni
1956	Pure Emotions of the Sea	帆綱は唄う 海の純情	Hozuna wa utau: Umi no junjo
1956	Satan's Town	悪魔の街	Akuma no machi
1957	Inn of the Floating Weeds	浮草の宿	Ukigusa no yado
1957	Eight Hours of Terror	8時間の恐怖	Hachijikan no kyōfu
1957	The Naked Woman and the Gun	裸女と拳銃	Rajo to kenjū
1958	Underworld Beauty	暗黒街の美女	Ankokugai no bijo
1958	Spring Never Came	踏みはずした春	Fumihazushita haru
1958	Young Breasts	青い乳房	Aoi chibusa
1958	Voice Without a Shadow	影なき声	Kagenaki koe
1959	Love Letter	らぶれたあ	Rabu retaa
1959	Passport to Darkness	暗黒の旅券	Ankoku no ryoken
1959	Age of Nudity	素っ裸の年令	Suppadaka no nenrei
1960	Take Aim at the Police Van	13号待避線より その護送車を狙え	Jūsangō taihisen yori: Sono gosōsha o nerae
1960	Sleep of the Beast	けものの眠り	Kemono no nemuri
1960	0-Line Stowaway	密航0ライン	Mikkō zero rain
1960	Everything Goes Wrong	すべてが狂ってる	Subete ga kurutteru
1960	Go to Hell, Hoodlums!	くたばれ愚連隊	Kutabare gurentai
1961	Tokyo Knights	東京騎士隊	Tōkyō naito
1961	A Hell of a Guy or Living by Karate	無鉄砲大将	Muteppō taishō
1961	Man with a Shotgun	散弾銃の男	Shottogan no otoko or Sandanjū no otoko
1961	A New Wind Over the Mountain Pass	峠を渡る若い風	Tōge o wataru wakai kaze
1961	Blood Red Water in the Channel	海峡、血に染めて	Kaikyō, chi ni somete
1961	Million Dollar Smash and Grab	百万弗を叩き出せ	Hyakuman doru o tatakidase
1962	Teen Yakuza	ハイティーンやくざ	Hai tiin yakuza
1962	The Guys Who Put Money on Me	俺に賭けた奴ら	Ore ni kaketa yatsura
1963	Detective Bureau 23: Go to Hell, Bastards!	探偵事務所23 くたばれ悪党ども	Tantei jimusho 23: Kutabare akutōdomo
1963	Youth of the Beast	野獣の青春	Yaju no seishun
1963	The Bastard	悪太郎	Akutarō
1963	Kanto Wanderer	関東無宿	Kantō mushuku
1964	The Flower and the Angry Waves	花と怒濤	Hana to dotō
1964	Gate of Flesh	肉体の門	Nikutai no mon
1964	Our Blood Will Not Forgive	俺たちの血が許さない	Oretachi no chi ga yurusanai
1965	Story of a Prostitute	春婦伝	Shunpu den
1965	Stories of Bastards: Born Under a Bad Star (also known as Born Under Crossed Stars)	悪太郎伝 悪い星の下でも	Akutarō den: Warui hoshi no shita demo
1965	Tattooed Life	刺青一代	Irezumi ichidai
1966	Carmen from Kawachi	河内カルメン	Kawachi Karumen
1966	Tokyo Drifter	東京流れ者	Tōkyō nagaremono
1966	Fighting Elegy	けんかえれじい	Kenka erejii
1967	Branded to Kill	殺しの烙印	Koroshi no rakuin
1977	A Tale of Sorrow and Sadness	悲愁物語	Hishū monogatari
1980	Zigeunerweisen	ツィゴイネルワイゼン	Tsigoineruwaizen
1981	Kagero-za	陽炎座	Kagerō-za
1985	Capone Cries a Lot	カポネ大いに泣く	Kapone ōi ni naku
1985	Lupin III: Legend of the Gold of Babylon	ルパン三世 バビロンの黄金伝説	Rupan sansei: Babiron no ōgon densetsu
1991	Yumeji	夢二	Yumeji
1993	Marriage: Jinnai-Harada Family Chapter (segment)	結婚 陣内・原田御両家篇	Kekkon: Jinnai-Harada goryōke hen
2001	Pistol Opera	ピストルオペラ	Pisutoru opera
2005	Princess Raccoon	オペレッタ狸御殿	Operetta Tanuki Goten

== Partial television and video work as director ==
Year	Title	Japanese	Romanization
1968	Good Evening Dear Husband "A Duel"	愛妻くんこんばんは「ある決闘」	Aisaikun konban wa: Aru kettō
1969	There's a Bird Inside a Man	男の中には鳥がいる	Otoko no naka ni wa tori ga iru
1970	A Mummy's Love	木乃伊の恋	Miira no koi
1979	The Fang in the Hole	穴の牙	Ana no kiba
1980	Chin Shunshin's The Nail of the Holy Beast	陳舜臣の神獣の爪	Chin shushin no shinjū no tsume
1981	Storm of Falling Petals: Banner of a Fireman in the Flames	花吹雪炎に舞う一番纏	Hana fubuki: Honō ni mau ichiban matoi
1983	Cherry Blossoms in Spring aka Seijun's Different Stages of Cherry Blossoms	春桜 ジャパネスク	Karu sakura japanesuke
1983	The Choice of a Family: I'll Kill Your Husband For You	家族の選択・貴方の亭主を殺してあげる	Kazoku no sentaku: Anata no teishu o koroshite ageru
1984	Lupin III Part III	ルパン三世 PartIII	Rupan sansei: Pāto surii (Episode 13)

== Partial film work as actor ==
Year	Title	Japanese	Romanization	Role	Director
1975	I Can't Wait Until Dark!	暗くなるまで待てない！	Kuraku naru-made matenai!		Kazuki Ōmori
1980	Disciples of Hippocrates	ヒポクラテスたち	Hipokuratesutachi	Mysterious thief	Kazuki Ōmori
1995	Cold Fever	n/a	n/a	Grandfather	Friðrik Þór Friðriksson
1997	Grass Carp Up a Tree	樹の上の草魚	Ki no ue no sōgyo	Hospital director Komine	Atsushi Ishikawa
1998	The Story of PuPu	プープーの物語	Pūpū no monogatari	Old man	Kensaku Watanabe
1998	Sleepless Town	不夜城	Fuyajō		Chi-Ngai Lee
1999	EM Embalming	エンバーミング	Enbāmingu	Embalmer's assistant	Shinji Aoyama
2002	Blessing Bell	幸福の鐘	Kōfuku no kane	Old man's ghost	Sabu
2004	Hakenkreuz	ハーケンクロイツの翼	Hākenkuroitsu no tsubasa		Kazuki Katashima
2007	Matouqin Nocturne	馬頭琴夜想曲	Batōkin yasōkyoku		Takeo Kimura
