= List of Japanese films of 2007 =

== Highest-grossing films ==
Rank	Title	Gross
1	Hero	¥8.15 billion
2	Pokémon: The Rise of Darkrai	¥5.02 billion
3	Always: Sunset on Third Street 2	¥4.56 billion
4	Saiyūki	¥4.37 billion
5	Love and Honor	¥4.11 billion

== List of films ==
A list of films released in Japan in 2007 (see 2007 in film).

Title	Director	Cast	Genre	Notes
5 Centimeters Per Second	Makoto Shinkai		Anime	
Adultery Addiction: Sensual Daze	Yumi Yoshiyuki	Sakurako Kaoru; Yumi Yoshiyuki	Pink	Silver Prize & Best Actress, 2nd place, Pink Grand Prix
Anata wo Wasurenai	Hanadou Junji		Biopic	
Appleseed Ex Machina : The Movie	Shinji Aramaki		Anime/Computer animation	
BLEACH the Movie: The DiamondDust Rebellion	Noriyuki Abe	Voices of Masakazu Morita, Romi Park, Fumiko Orikasa, Kentarō Itō	Supernatural/action/anime	Based on a manga/anime series created by Tite Kubo/Sequel to Memories of Nobody
Bubble Fiction: Boom or Bust				
Crayon Shin-chan: The Singing Bomb				
Crows ZERO	Takashi Miike			
Dear Friends		Keiko Kitagawa; Yuika Motokariya		
Detective Conan: Jolly Roger in the Deep Azure			Anime	
Doraemon the Movie: Nobita's New Great Adventure into the Underworld - The Seven Magic Users				
Eiga De Tojo-Tamagotchi: Dokidoki! Uchuu no Maigotchi!?				
Evangelion: 1.0 You Are (Not) Alone			Anime	
Gakkō no Kaidan	Hirohisa Sasaki			
GeGeGe no Kitaro				
GoGo Sentai Boukenger vs. Super Sentai			Tokusatsu V-Cinema	30th anniversary film for Super Sentai franchise
Hero				
Jūken Sentai Gekiranger: Nei-Nei! Hō-Hō! Hong Kong Great Deciding Match	Shōjirō Nakazawa	Hiroki Suzuki, Mina Fukui, Manpei Takagi, Hirofumi Araki, Yuka Hirata, Mayumi Ono, Yinling		
JoJo's Bizarre Adventure: Phantom Blood	Jūnichi Hayama	Katsuyuki Konishi, Hikaru Midorikawa, Nana Mizuki, Rikiya Koyama, Tsutomu Isobe, Yoshisada Sakaguchi	Action, Fighting, Horror	Produced in commemoration of JoJo's Bizarre Adventure's 25th anniversary; never released on home video at the request of JoJo creator Hirohiko Araki.
Kamen Rider the Next	Ryuta Tasaki	Masaya Kikawada, Hassei Takano, Hiroshi Miyauchi, Eiji Wentz	Tokusatsu	Borrows elements of Kamen Rider V3/Sequel to Kamen Rider The First
Koizora	Aragaki Yui	[Haruma Miura]	Romance	
Maiko Haaaan!!!	Nobuo Mizuta	Sadao Abe	Comedy	
Matouqin Nocturne	Takeo Kimura	Yamaguchi Sayoko	Abstract film	
Master Of Thunder				
Megane	Naoko Ogigami			Won the Manfred Salzgeber Award at the 2008 Berlin International Film Festival
Molester's Train: Sensitive Fingers	Yoshikazu Katō	Miki Arakawa	Pink	Best Film of the year, Pink Grand Prix
Monkey Magic: The Movie
The Mourning Forest	Naomi Kawase			Won the Grand Prix at Cannes
Naruto: Shippūden the Movie			Anime	
One Piece the Movie: Episode of Alabasta: The Desert Princess and the Pirates		Mayumi Tanaka, Kazuya Nakai, Akemi Okamura, Kappei Yamaguchi, Hiroaki Hirata, Ikue Ōtani, Yuriko Yamaguchi, Misa Watanabe		
Piano no Mori	Masayuki Kojima		Anime	
Poketto Monsutā Daiyamondo to Pāru Diaruga VS Parukia VS Dākurai				10th movie of Pokémon
Shakugan no Shana : The Movie			Anime	
Shindō			Drama	
Summer Days with Coo	Keiichi Hara		Anime	
Sword of the Stranger	Masahiro Andō		Anime	
Tetsujin Nijūhachi-gō: Hakuchū no Zangetsu	Yasuhiro Imagawa		Anime	Based on a manga
Tokyo Tower: Mom and Me, and Sometimes Dad	Joji Matsuoka	Jō Odagiri		Japan Academy Prize for Best Film
Trigun X			Anime	
Tsukue no Nakami	Keisuke Yoshida	Kōji Abe, Mio Suzuki, Ai Higa, Sō Sakamoto, Natsumi Kiyoura, Yutaka Mishima		
Vexille	Fumihiko Sori		Computer animation	
Watching Fuckin' TV All Time Makes a Fool		Tōru Kamei	Honoka, Akifumi Miura	Based on a manga
Welcome to the Quiet Room			Drama/Comedy	
Yunagi no Machi, Sakura no Kuni (Town of Evening Calm, Country of Cherry Blossoms)'	Kiyoshi Sasabe	Kumiko Asō, Yû Yoshizawa, Mitsunori Isaki, Shiho Fujimura, Rina Koike, Asami Katsura, Rena Tanaka, Noriko Nakagoshi, Yuta Kanai, Masaaki Sakai, Urara Awata, Ryosei Tayama	History, Human	
