= Sunohara =

Sunohara (written: 春原) is a Japanese surname. Notable people with the surname include:

- Masahisa Sunohara (春原 政久, 1906–1997), Japanese film director
- Vicky Sunohara (born 1970), Canadian ice hockey player

Fictional characters:

- Youhei Sunohara (春原 陽平), a character in the visual novel Clannad
- Ayaka (春原 彩花) and Nana Sunohara (春原 菜々), characters from the manga and anime series Miss Caretaker of Sunohara-sou
