= The Young Rebel =

The Young Rebel may refer to

- The Young Rebel (1963 film), directed by Seijun Suzuki
- The Young Rebel (1967 film), directed by Vincent Sherman and it's about Miguel de Cervantes
- Prabhas (born 1979), Indian film actor, often nicknamed the Young Rebel
