= After Life (film) =

- Japanese book cover of the novelised version of the film
- Directed by: Hirokazu Kore-eda
- Written by: Hirokazu Kore-eda
- Produced by: Masayuki Akieda; Shiho Sato
- Starring: Arata; Erika Oda; Susumu Terajima; Sayaka Yoshino; Takashi Naito; Kei Tani
- Cinematography: Yutaka Yamazaki; Masayoshi Sukita
- Edited by: Hirokazu Kore-eda
- Music by: Yasuhiro Kasamatsu
- Production companies: Engine Film; TV Man Union
- Distributed by: Engine Film; TV Man Union
- Release dates: 11 September 1998 (Toronto Film Festival); 17 April 1999 (Japan)
- Running time: 118 minutes
- Country: Japan
- Language: Japanese
- Box office: $801,985

After Life (Japanese: ワンダフルライフ, Hepburn: Wandafuru Raifu; lit. 'Wonderful Life') is a 1998 Japanese film edited, written and directed by Hirokazu Kore-eda starring Arata, Erika Oda, Susumu Terajima, Sayaka Yoshino among other regarded cast members. It premiered on 11 September 1998 at the 1998 Toronto International Film Festival and distributed in over 30 countries, bringing international recognition to Kore-eda's work.

The film was also shown at the 1998 San Sebastián International Film Festival, where it won the FIPRESCI prize "for its universal theme, its empathy for nostalgia and its homage to cinema as transcending life". The film received seven awards and eight nominations worldwide.

In August 2021, The Criterion Collection announced a re-release of the film, in a 2K remaster together with interviews, deleted scenes, audio commentary and an essay by novelist Viet Thanh Nguyen.

== Plot ==
A small, mid-20th century social-service-style structure is a way station between life and death. Every Monday, a group of recently deceased people check-in: the social workers in the lodge ask them to go back over their life and choose one single memory to take into the afterlife. They are given just a couple of days to identify their happiest memory, after which the workers design, stage and film them. In this way, the souls will be able to re-experience this moment for eternity, forgetting the rest of their life. They will spend eternity within their happiest memory.

Twenty-two souls of different ages and backgrounds arrive and are received by the counsellors, who explain to them their situation. Lengthy interviews take place in the lodge, with each person having different perspectives of their lives. There is a gentle old woman whose fondest memory is cherry blossoms. There is an aviator whose happiest moments were spent flying through the clouds. There is also a teenager, Kana Yoshino (Sayaka Yoshino) whose happiest memory is Splash Mountain at Disneyland. Told that she's the thirtieth to choose Disneyland rides (most of the others were also teenage girls), she is gently coaxed into coming up with something more original from her childhood (the scent of fresh laundry and the feeling of her mother, whom she was cuddling against). A 78-year-old woman talks about a new dress her brother bought her for a childhood dance recital, a brother she loved and took care of "until the very end." A prostitute remembers a client who was kind; a potential suicide victim recalls what made him pull back from the brink; an old man remembers the breeze on his face when he rode a trolley to school. An older man incessantly talks about sex and prostitutes, but ultimately chooses the memory of his daughter handing him the bouquet at her wedding. A wild-haired 21-year-old wearing leather pants refuses point-blank to choose anything at all.

The story focuses on the two younger counsellors, Takashi (Arata) and Shiori (Erica Oda). Takashi has been assigned to help Ichiro Watanabe (Sadao Abe), a 70-year-old man who glumly remembers his dull, conventional life in an arranged marriage as unfulfilling. To jog his memory, Takashi plays back excerpts from a file of year-by-year videotapes recording Watanabe's life. Takashi learns from the films that Watanabe's wife, Kyoko, was also Takashi's fiancée, and that the two men are about the same age. Takashi died in his early twenties in the Philippines in World War II and had been working at different processing centers since then. Takashi requests Watanabe to be assigned to another counsellor, but his request is not granted.

Near the end of the week, Watanabe decides which memory to keep. Watanabe apologizes to Takashi for causing Takashi trouble and picking a memory so late. Takashi asks him not to apologize and reveals to Watanabe that all the counsellors staying in the lodge are souls who refused or were unable to choose a memory.

The social workers recreate the memories by filming on sets with basic stage props (cotton balls serve as clouds for the pilot; an audio recording of street noise is played while the old man stands in a trolley and social workers jostle the trolley to replicate movement). On Saturday, all the hosted souls except the wild-haired young man watch the films of their recreated memories in a screening room, and as soon as each person sees their own, they vanish.

Takashi, while putting away the videotapes from Watanabe's room, finds a letter from Watanabe saying Watanabe realized that his wife was Takashi's fiancée, and his wife had visited Takashi's grave every year, alone, during her and Watanabe's marriage. Watanabe writes in his letter that he appreciates Takashi's kindness in not mentioning that he was his wife's dead fiancé, and that it was only through his experience with Takashi and watching the videotapes that he was able to come to peace with his life and choose a memory with his wife.

Takashi talks to Shiori about his life, and Shiori finds his fiancée's selected memory from the archive. In watching his fiancée's selected memory, Takashi realizes she chose a memory with him, before his death. In discovering that he had figured in his fiancée's chosen moment to cherish, Takashi comes to the realization that "I have learnt I was part of someone else's happiness." He chooses that moment of realization as his sliver of life to be filmed and abandons the way station forever, spending eternity in this memory.

The next day, the remaining staff prepare for a new group of arrivals, and address the difficulties they will face in integrating the recalcitrant young man into the staff. The film ends with Shiori, now a full-fledged counsellor, practicing for an interview.

== Cast ==
- Arata as Takashi Mochizuki
- Erika Oda as Shiori Satonaka
- Susumu Terajima as Satoru Kawashima
- Taketoshi Naito as Ichiro Watanabe
- Takashi Naito as Takuro Sugie
- Hisako Hara as Kiyo Nishimura
- Kei Tani as Kennosuke Nakamura
- Kisuke Shoda as Toru Yuri
- Kazuko Shirakawa as Nobuko Amano
- Yūsuke Iseya as Yusuke Iseya
- Sayaka Yoshino as Kana Yoshino
- Kotaro Shiga as Kenji Yamamoto
- Kyōko Kagawa as Kyoko Watanabe (Takashi's ex-fiancée and Mr Watanabe's wife)
- Natsuo Ishido as Kyoko Watanabe (as a young woman)
- Sadao Abe as Ichiro Watanabe (as a young man)

== Themes and techniques ==
Kore-eda conceived the film from a childhood experience he had with his grandfather, who suffered from a neurodegenerative disease in a time when this kind of syndrome was yet not well known. Remembering his gradual loss of memory, which led him not to recognize the faces of his relatives and eventually his own, he commented that "I comprehended little of what I saw, but I remember thinking that people forgot everything when they died. I now understand how critical memories are to our identity, to a sense of self".

In the development phase of the script, the director interviewed over five hundred people from disparate social backgrounds, asking each to share their personal memories. This process extended into the audition stages, where eventual cast members were also invited to write down the memory they would take with them to their after life. Kore-eda was "intrigued by how often people chose upsetting experiences". The film alternates real footage of these interviews with acting, some based on improvisation, some on a specific script; the interviews were shot on 16 mm film stock by Yutaka Yamazaki, a recognized documentary cinematographer. With this method, Kore-eda combined documentary with a fictional narrative.

In the film, memories themselves are altered by people when they recall them and are subjectively revised, enhanced and reinterpreted when they are staged and recreated. About this ambiguous, fleeting nature of memory, Kore-eda reflects:

I saw that human emotions are the sparks that fly when "truth" and "fiction" collide. In this film, I wanted to explore the consequences of such collision by investigating the uncertain area between "objective record" and "recollection". Although the memories in After Life are presented as real experiences that are later reconstructed as film, you can't really distinguish the stories characters tell as "truth" and the recreations as "fiction". They intertwine with great complexity. Our memories are not fixed or static. They are dynamic, reflecting selves that are constantly changing. So the act of remembering, of looking back at the past, is by no means redundant or negative. Rather, it challenges us to evolve and mature.

For the memory sequences, shot both in colour and black and white on a mixture of 8 mm and 16 mm film, Kore-eda involved the still photographer Masayoshi Sukita (best known at the time for his work on the set of Mystery Train).

== Reception ==
After Life received positive reviews. On review aggregator website Rotten Tomatoes, the film holds an approval rating of 89% based on 35 reviews, with an average rating of 7.3/10. The site's critical consensus reads: "After Life is an offbeat and tender exploration of memory, love, and life after death". Metacritic assigned the film a weighted average score of 91 out of 100, based on 19 critics, indicating "universal acclaim".

On AllMovie, Keith Phipps gave the film five out of five stars, describing it as "a peculiar and uniquely moving examination of life after death" and observing how the film "almost incidentally serves as a meditation on filmmaking, both as an activity and as a means of representing human experience". "Its unhurried pace and lack of melodrama, like its subject, may linger in the memory long afterwards", adds Jonathan Crow in the same review.

Roger Ebert of the Chicago Sun-Times gave the film four out of four stars, calling it "a film that reaches out gently to the audience" and comparing it favorably to James Joyce's story "The Dead". He concluded that Kore-eda, with this and his previous film Maborosi, "has earned the right to be considered with Kurosawa, Bergman and other great humanists of the cinema".

== Stage adaptation ==
A stage play based on the film opened in the Dorfman Theatre at the National Theatre, London from 2 June 2021. The play is written by Jack Thorne, designed by Bunny Christie and directed by Jeremy Herrin, in a co-production with Headlong.
