= Inochi =

- Film poster
- Directed by: Shinohara Tetsuo
- Screenplay by: Sumio Ōmori
- Produced by: Hidenori Iyoda; Junichi Shindo
- Starring: Esumi Makiko; Etsushi Toyokawa
- Cinematography: Takeshi Hamada
- Edited by: Isao Tomita; Nobuko Tomita
- Music by: Tatsuya Murayama
- Distributed by: Toei Company
- Release date: September 14, 2002 (Japan)
- Running time: 111 minutes
- Country: Japan
- Language: Japanese

Inochi (Japanese: 命; lit. "Life") is a 2002 Japanese film directed by Shinohara Tetsuo starring Esumi Makiko and Etsushi Toyokawa. It is based on a memoir of the same title by the Korean-Japanese author Yu Miri.

== Plot ==
Yu Miri (Esumi) is a writer who's just become pregnant by her married lover. When she decides to keep the baby without his help, her ex-boyfriend Yutaka (Toyokawa), now struggling with terminal cancer, decides to help raise him, pledging to "live long enough to hear him say my name."
