= Makiko Esumi =

Japanese actor and writer

- Born: Makiko Esumi (江角 真紀子); 18 December 1966 (age 59); Izumo, Shimane, Japan
- Other name: Makiko Hirano （平野 真紀子）
- Occupations: Model; actress; writer; essayist; lyricist
- Years active: 1995–2017
- Spouses: Shin Hirano, Rowland Kirishima (divorced)
- Children: 2
- Website: https://web.archive.org/web/20090815065200/http://www.ken-on.co.jp/artist/html/esumi.html

Makiko Esumi (江角 マキコ, Esumi Makiko) (born 18 December 1966 in Izumo, Shimane Prefecture, Japan) is a former Japanese model, actress, writer, essayist, and lyricist. Esumi is most well known for her role as Chinatsu Tsuboi in the Japanese television drama series Shomuni.

Esumi won the 1995 Rookie of the Year Award at both the 19th Annual Japan Academy Prize ceremonies and at the 38th Blue Ribbon Awards for her role in the 1995 film Maborosi. She was nominated in 2002 for the Best Actress Award at the 26th Annual Japan Academy Prize ceremonies for her role in Inochi.

In 2000, she released her single, One Way Drive, featuring guitar work and production by Tomoyasu Hotei, who also co-wrote the song with Esumi. She wrote a children's book in 2005.

Esumi is married to Fuji TV director Shin Hirano and is distantly related to Koji Ezumi, a goalkeeper for Omiya Ardija. She was previously married to photographer Rowland Kirishima. She gave birth in 2005 to her first daughter, with her second due to be born in December 2009.

She is represented by the talent management firm Ken-On.

== Biography ==
While a high school student, Esumi worked as a miko at Izumo-taisha. After graduating from high school, she signed with the Japan Tobacco Women's Volleyball team (now the JT Marvelous in the V.League). She was injured in 1989 while playing and decided to pursue a career in show business after watching actress and singer Miki Imai on television while recovering in the hospital. She then focused on a career as a fashion model.

In 1995, Esumi made her acting debut as Yumiko in Maborosi, a film directed by Hirokazu Koreeda. Edward Guthmann of the San Francisco Chronicle gave her acting high praise, describing it as "extraordinary" and stating she played the role with "delicacy and physical grace". Esumi won the Rookie of the Year Award at both the 19th Annual Japan Academy Prize ceremonies and at the 38th Blue Ribbon Awards for her role in Maborosi. Esumi married photographer Rowland Kirishima in February 1996, though they divorced only nine months later.

She is probably best known for her leading role as the rebellious office lady Tsuboi Chinatsu in the Shomuni series of TV dramas, the first of which aired on Fuji TV from April to July 1998. A second series aired from April to June 2000, with a third airing from July to September 2002. Several specials were also produced. Esumi made her singing debut on 26 April 2000 with the release of her One Way Drive single. The title song was used as the ending theme to the second Shomuni series, with the lyrics by Esumi and the music by guitarist Tomoyasu Hotei.

Esumi was described as "stunning" in her lead role of Stray Cat in the 2001 Pistol Opera, one of Seijun Suzuki last films.

She was nominated in 2002 for the Best Actress Award at the 26th Annual Japan Academy Prize ceremonies for her role in Inochi.

Esumi and Fuji TV director Shin Hirano were married in 2003. That same year, she began appearing in Japanese government television and print advertisements encouraging the public to make their pension contributions, but started a small scandal in 2004 when it was reported that she was not making those same pension contributions herself. She stated that she thought she had been making the payments, and then corrected the issue by becoming current on her contributions. Esumi's image was removed from the ads at the direction of the Social Insurance Agency after the scandal broke.

Her eldest daughter was born in February 2005, and a second daughter was announced in July 2009 as due to be born in December. Esumi wrote a personal note about this announcement which her talent agency subsequently published on their site.

In a 20 May 2007 article in the Asahi Shimbun, Esumi revealed that her younger brother had died at the age of 36 the previous May of complications due to cancer.

== Filmography ==
=== Films ===
- Maborosi (Yumiko, 9 December 1995)
- Koi wa Maiorita. (Machiko, 17 May 1997)
- Dinosaur (voice of Neera, 19 May 2000)
- Pistol Opera (Miyuki Minazuki / Stray Cat / Killer No. 3, 27 October 2001)
- Inochi (Yu Miri, 14 September 2002)
- Tsuribaka Nisshi 15: Hama-chan ni Ashita wa nai!? (Kaori Hayakawa, 21 August 2004)
- Mushishi (Nui, 24 March 2006)
- Bolt (voice of Mittens, 1 August 2009)

=== Television drama ===
- Kagayake Rintarō (Mamiko Tsunoda, TBS, 6 October to 24 December 1995)
- Garasu no Kakera-tachi (Natsume Tamura, TBS, 12 July to 20 September 1996)
- Konna Watashi ni Dare ga Shita (Yōko Ōmatsu, Fuji TV, 15 October to 17 December 1996)
- Tsuki no Kagayaku Yoru Dakara (Tokiko Satonaka (first starring role in a drama), Fuji TV, 1 July to 16 September 1997)
- Koi no Katamichi Kippu (Narumi and Harumi Minamizaki, NTV, 15 October to 17 December 1997)
- GTO (friendly nurse, KTV, 7 July to 22 September 1998)
- Shomuni (Chinatsu Tsuboi, Fuji TV, 15 April to 1 July 1998)
- Shomuni Special 1 (Chinatsu Tsuboi, Fuji TV, 7 October 1998)
- Over Time (Natsuki Kasahara, Fuji TV, 4 January to 22 March 1999)
- Dokushin Seikatsu (Kyōko Ōzawa, TBS, 9 July to 17 September 1999)
- Kon'ya wa Eigyōchū (Junko Sakiyama, NTV, 18 September 1999)
- Yo ni mo Kimyō na Monogatari "Mosaic" (female producer, Fuji TV, 27 September 1999)
- Shomuni New Year Special (Chinatsu Tsuboi, Fuji TV, 2 January 2000)
- Omoide Kakurenbo (sister of Tetsuya Watari, TV Asahi, 4 March 2000)
- Shomuni 2 (Chinatsu Tsuboi, Fuji TV, 12 April to 28 June 2000)
- Love Revolution (Kyōko Asaoka, Fuji TV, 9 April to 25 June 2001)
- Number One (Yoshie Miyake, TBS, 27 December 2001)
- Shomuni Final (Chinatsu Tsuboi, Fuji TV, 3 July to 18 September 2002)
- Marusa!! Tokyo Kokuzei Kyokusa Satsubu (Kaneko Tsuburaya, KTV, 8 April to 24 June 2003)
- Shomuni Forever (Chinatsu Tsuboi, Fuji TV, 1 January 2003)
- Ruten no Ōhi: Saigo no Kōtei (Yoshiko Kawashima, TV Asahi, 29–30 November 2003)
- Sore wa, Totsuzen, Arashi no yō ni... (Kozue Ogawa, TBS, 14 January to 17 March 2004)
- Otōto (Takiko Mizunoe, TV Asahi, 17–25 November 2004)
- Saturday Drama Machiben (Ryōko Amachi, NHK-G, 8 April to 13 May 2006)
- Triple Kitchen (Kiriko Imaizumi, TBS, 1 August 2006)
- Jigoku no Sata mo Yome Shidai (Makoto (Morifuku) Tachibana, TBS, 5 July to 13 September 2007)
- Shomuni 2013 (Chinatsu Tsuboi, Fuji TV, 10 July to 18 September 2013)

== Books ==
Esumi has released two artistic nude photo books: Esumi in October 1996 (ISBN 4947648406, Little More); and E-Mode in November 1999 (ISBN 4898150128, Little More). She has also published two works of literature: an autobiography titled Moeru Gomi (燃えるゴミ; lit. "Burnable Trash"), published in December 1997 (ISBN 4048835149, Kadokawa Shoten) and reprinted in July 1999 (ISBN 4043488017, Kadokawa Shoten); and an essay titled Mō, Mayowanai Seikatsu (もう、迷わない生活; lit. No More Hesitation in Life), published in March 2006 (ISBN 4083330546, Shueisha).
