= Stories of Bastards: Born Under a Bad Star =

- Directed by: Seijun Suzuki
- Screenplay by: Ryozo Kasahara
- Based on: Born Under Crossed Stars by Toko Kon
- Produced by: Masayuki Takagi
- Starring: Yumiko Nogawa; Ruriko Ito; Chikako Miyagi; Michio Hino
- Cinematography: Kazue Nagatsuka
- Edited by: Akira Suzuki
- Music by: Hajime Okumura
- Distributed by: Nikkatsu
- Release date: August 25, 1965
- Running time: 98 minutes
- Country: Japan
- Language: Japanese

Stories of Bastards: Born Under a Bad Star (悪太郎伝 悪い星の下でも, Akutarō den: Warui hoshi no shita demo)—also known as Born Under Crossed Stars is a 1965 Japanese film directed by Seijun Suzuki for the Nikkatsu Corporation. It was adapted from a Toko Kon novel, as Suzuki had done with its predecessor The Bastard (1963) and would do again with Carmen from Kawachi the following year.
