= Power Office Girls =

Television series

- Screenshot of the title screen for the Japanese TV drama series Shomuni

ショムニ
- Genre: Comedy
- Manga
- Written by: Hiroyuki Yasuda
- Published by: Kodansha
- Magazine: Weekly Morning
- Original run: 1996 – 1997
- Volumes: 7
- Television drama
- Produced by: Funazu Koichi
- Original network: Fuji Television
- Original run: April 15, 1998 – July 1, 1998
- Episodes: 12 + 2 specials
- Television drama
- Produced by: Funazu Koichi, Kobayashi Hiroyuki
- Original network: Fuji Television
- Original run: April 12, 2000 – June 28, 2000
- Episodes: 12
- Television drama

Shomuni FINAL
- Produced by: Funazu Koichi, Miyamoto Rieko, Nakamura YUriko
- Original network: Fuji Television
- Original run: July 3, 2002 – September 18, 2002
- Episodes: 12 + 1 special
- Television drama

Shomuni 2013
- Produced by: Iwata Yuji
- Original network: Fuji Television
- Original run: July 10, 2013 – September 18, 2013
- Episodes: 10

Shomuni (ショムニ) (also called Power Office Girls) is a comedic TV drama serial based on the Japanese manga of the same name by Hiroyuki Yasuda (安田弘之, Yasuda Hiroyuki), though much of the details (all besides the company name and the characters) have departed from the comic. Released in 1998, Shomuni was a surprise winner of the ratings war for drama serials aired in Japan between April and June, despite being projected to finish a lowly thirteenth in a survey conducted by a major TV station.

== Story ==
The stories revolve around the office ladies (OL) of General Administration Section 2 (Shomu ni, or GA-2) in a large multinational company called Manpan Corporation.

GA-2 is called "the graveyard for female office ladies", simply because it is the place where female employees are dumped should they mess up big time elsewhere. Rarely is anyone ever allowed to leave for other more purposeful departments. Jobs include replacing used toilet rolls, changing light bulbs, organizing company outings, and other menial tasks. GA-2 is located in the basement, which is in fact a disused store room.

The purpose of GA-2 is to convince these errant – or simply useless – employees to quit (and typically people last three days at most) due to the monotonous and meaningless nature of the job, just so that the company, headed by sex-crazed executives and a Personnel Section willing to stoop to any means, will save on the costs of firing them.

However, the employees posted to GA-2 exhibit no intention to quit, to the chagrin of the Personnel Section Chief Torao Terasaki (寺崎寅男, Terasaki Torao) and his assistant Nonomura (野々村), since the people at Shomuni are happy their menial jobs give them more than enough time to pursue their other interests during office hours.

As the drama series progresses, it is evident that these seemingly lowly employees have their own pride despite them being the most despised employees in the company, and in every episode, they end up saving the company from a potential catastrophe, inadvertently or otherwise.

GA-2 has one male employee, the friendly and affable Section Chief Kōji Inoue (井上洸二, Inoue Kōji), whose role can at best be described as that of a nominal caretaker. Save for caring for a female tabby cat, he is an old man who appears to be only interested in waiting for his retirement age while idling in the GA-2 office.

== Characters ==
GA-2 was composed of four women from the start of the first episode, and is seen first through the eyes of Tsukahara Sawako (the fifth woman to join GA-2).

1. Chinatsu Tsuboi (坪井千夏, Tsuboi Chinatsu) is the tallest person in GA-2 and is also often their leader. She is responsible for carrying the ladder which GA-2 uses for fixing lightbulbs. Her uniform skirt is shorter than those of the other women in GA-2. Chinatsu believes that a woman's worth is determined by how many men she "conquers", or sleeps with (Episode 1). Before she entered Manpan Corporation, she used to work as a nightclub hostess (episode 1).
2. Kana Miyashita (宮下佳奈, Miyashita Kana) has a past which few people know about. She is often not seen having lunch with her fellow GA-2 colleagues in the company canteen, for she spends lunch hour with different male high-ranking executives of the company. In episode 6 of the first season, it is revealed that Kana was the tenth mistress of Manpan's late president, and that he sent her expensive gifts of jewelry
3. Azusa Tokunaga (徳永あずさ, Tokunaga Azusa) is the second oldest employee in GA-2, after Section Chief Inoue. Nobody in GA-2 seems to remember how she ended up in GA-2. She is responsible for making announcements as well as drawing up the daily company routines of GA-2. Highly interested in stock investments. Azusa is also trying to find a husband, and once slipped a personals ad into the folder of a high powered executive.
4. Rie Himukai (日向リエ, Himukai Rie) is the quirkiest of the GA-2 members. Her mother sells antiques and her father has a photocopy store. She has a night job as a fortune teller at night after work at GA-2 – and her predictions are never wrong. Her foresight often sparks an entire episode, depending on GA-2's interpretation on her prediction. Much of her comic appeal comes from her deadpan delivery.
5. Sawako Tsukahara (塚原佐和子, Tsukuhara Sawako) is the youngest (at age 21) employee in GA-2, and is very incompetent at getting the job done correctly due to her extremely simple and innocent manner. After knocking down the president of Manpan Corporation in an elevator lobby (as the result of a fight between her and a wronged wife in an elevator) she was posted to GA-2. She is in love with Mr. Ukyo, and Azusa labels her to be 'ambitious'.
6. Ume Maruhashi (丸橋梅, Maruhashi Ume) At the end of the third episode, she became the sixth member of GA-2. She attended elementary school with Chinatsu, and is one of the few people who can get Chinatsu visibly angry. In episode 7, Ume tells Sawako she remembers Chinatsu as "...a big crybaby who got nicknamed Gassy Chinatsu." Highly ambitious, she is learning several languages (such as Arabic) and aims to leave GA-2 as soon as she can. She is a computer analyst, and specializes in acquiring information.

Each of the twelve episodes usually focuses on the developments of one character of Shomuni. Each episode is independent of another, except for the season's finale.

== Sequel ==
Two sequels to Shomuni were made, as well as three Special movie editions. Shomuni was followed up by two TV movies: Shomuni Special 1 (aired on October 7, 1998), Shomuni Special 2 (aired on January 2, 2000), and two sequel drama serials: Shomuni 2 (aired April 12, 2000 – June 28, 2000) and Shomuni Final (July 3, 2002 – September 18, 2002). A third TV movie, Shomuni Forever, was aired on January 1, 2003, to round off the drama series.[2] In the end, each individual leave GA-2 2 months apart from one another. Tsukahara is last.

In 2013, another Shomuni was made since the previous season's departure in 2002, known as Shomuni 2013 or Shomuni 4/Power Office Girls 4, premiering on Fuji TV on July 10. Led by the same actress Esumi Makiko as the main protagonist, this season was completely backed up by a totally new supporting cast.

== Cast List ==
- Makiko Esumi (江角マキコ) as Chinatsu Tsuboi
- Mai Hōshō (宝生舞) as Ume Maruhashi
- Kotomi Kyono (京野ことみ) as Sawako Tsukahara
- Atsuko Sakurai (櫻井淳子) as Kana Miyashita
- Keiko Toda (戸田恵子) as Azusa Tokunaga
- Yumiko Takahashi (高橋由美子) as Rie Himukai
- Naho Toda (戸田菜穂) as Kaoru Sugita
- Ken Ishiguro (石黒賢) as Tomonori Ukyō
- Leo Morimoto (森本レオ) as Kouji Inoue
- Katsumi Takahashi (高橋克実) as Terasaki
- Toshihito Itō (伊藤俊人) as Nonomura
