= Taijiro Tamura =

Japanese novelist (1911–1983)

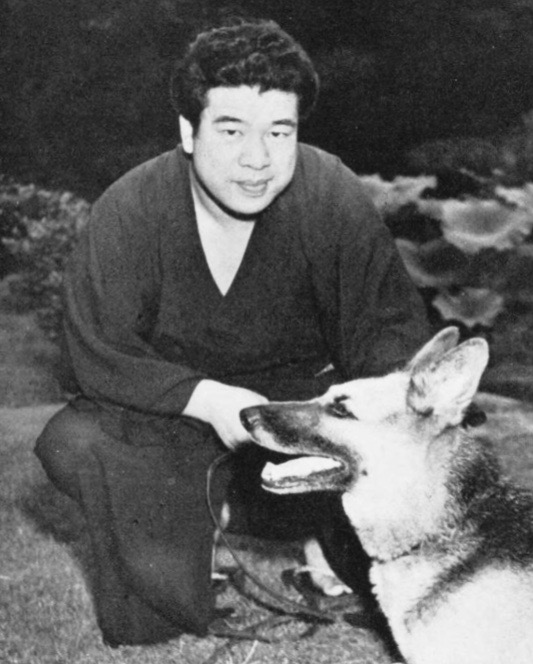
Taijiro-Tamura-1

Taijiro Tamura (田村 泰次郎, Tamura Taijirō; 30 November 1911 - 2 November 1983) was a Japanese novelist. He was born in Yokkaichi, Mie, and was educated at Waseda University in Tokyo where he studied literature. His most famous work is Gate of Flesh, which has been adapted into a movie four times and most recently in 2008 into a TV Asahi television series. His work is known for its emphasis on carnality and the physical body.

== Films ==
Gate of Flesh (Nikutai no mon) was first adapted by directors Masahiro Makino and Masafusa Ozaki in 1948, just one year after the publication of the novel. Later adaptions were by directors Seijun Suzuki (1964), Shōgorō Nishimura (1977), and Hideo Gosha (1988, as Carmen 1945).

Director Senkichi Taniguchi adapted another novel of Tamura in his film Escape at Dawn in 1950, which was remade by Seijun Suzuki as Story of a Prostitute in 1965.
