= Tomiko Ishii =

Japanese actress (1935–2022)

- Born: 12 January 1935; Osaka, Japan
- Died: 6 October 2022 (aged 87)
- Occupation: Actress
- Years active: 1950–2019
- Spouse: Yūichorō Yamane (m. 1963)
- Children: 1

Tomiko Ishii (石井 トミコ, Ishii Tomiko; 12 January 1935 – 6 October 2022) was a Japanese actress. She died on 6 October 2022, at the age of 87.

== Filmography ==
=== Film ===
- Gate of Flesh (1964), Roku
- Daimon Otokode Shinitai (1969)
- The Ramen Girl (2009), Megumi

=== Television ===
- Oshin (1983), Mrs. Sakuragi
- Kinpachi-sensei (1979), Miyo Tanaka
