= Daimon Otokode Shinitai =

- Film poster
- Directed by: Akinori Matsuo
- Written by: Seiji Hoshikawa
- Starring: Hideki Takahashi; Shigeru Tsuyuguchi; Yoko Machida; Yoshiro Aoki; Toru Abe
- Music by: Hajime Kaburagi
- Distributed by: Nikkatsu
- Release date: March 15, 1969 (Japan)
- Running time: 87 minutes
- Country: Japan
- Language: Japanese

Daimon Otokode Shinitai (Japanese: 代紋 男で死にたい), also known as Family Crest: Die Like a Man, is a 1969 Japanese yakuza film directed by Akinori Matsuo.

== Plot ==
The brothers of Tetsujirō and Tetsugorō, who lost their parents and home after the Great Kanto Earthquake, were picked up and grew up by a Yakuza Goi clan. One day, Tetsugorō fights the confronted yakuza Honma clan, and is expelled from Goi clan's Boss. Later, boss Goi is attacked by Honma clan's assassin and seriously injured. The assassin is Tetsutaōr, Tetsugorō's eldest brother, who had been missing after the Great Kanto Earthquake.

== Cast ==
- Hideki Takahashi as Nonaka Tetsugorō
- Shigeru Tsuyuguchi as Nonaka Tetsujirō
- Yumiko Nogawa as Ochō
- Yoshirō Aoki as Nonaka Tetsutarō
- Ryōhei Uchida as Obuse Keita
- Hei Enoki as Tamura Gunji
- Shouki Fukae as Honma Ginzō
- Tomiko Ishii as Shibata Chiyo
- Yoko Machida as Nonaka Shima
- Ichirō Sugai as Goi Kiichirō
- Toru Abe as Omori Giichirō
