= A Certain Killer =

1967 film directed by Kazuo Mori

- Film poster
- Directed by: Kazuo Mori
- Screenplay by: Yasuzo Masumura; Yoshihiro Ishimatsu
- Based on: Zenya by Shinji Fujiwara
- Starring: Raizō Ichikawa; Yumiko Nogawa; Mikio Narita
- Cinematography: Kazuo Miyagawa
- Edited by: Toshio Taniguchi
- Music by: Hajime Kaburagi
- Production company: Daiei Film
- Release date: April 29, 1967 (Japan)
- Running time: 88 minutes
- Country: Japan
- Language: Japanese

A Certain Killer (Japanese: ある殺し屋, Hepburn: Aru Koroshiya) is a 1967 Japanese crime suspense film directed by Kazuo Mori. Its screenplay was written by Yasuzo Masumura and Yoshihiro Ishimatsu. The film stars Raizō Ichikawa. It was adapted from the novel Zenya written by Shinji Fujiwara. A sequel, Aru Koroshiya no Kage, was released in the same year.

== Plot ==
Shoizawa is working as a chef at a small restaurant but it is a cover for who he really is. He is an assassin who takes charge of killing people with money. One day, he is asked to murder Owada, the boss of the yakuza clan, for 20 million yen.

== Cast ==
- Raizō Ichikawa as Shiozawa
- Yumiko Nogawa as Keiko
- Mikio Narita as Maeda
- Mayumi Nagisa as Shigeko
- Asao Koike as Kimura
- Saburo Date as Joe
- Sachiko Kobayashi as Midori
- Chikara Hashimoto as Guard
- Tatsuo Matsushita as Owada
