= Massacre Gun =

- Directed by: Yasuharu Hasebe
- Written by: Yasuharu Hasebe; Ryūzō Nakanishi
- Starring: Joe Shishido; Tatsuya Fuji; Jirō Okazaki
- Cinematography: Kazue Nagatsuka
- Music by: Naozumi Yamamoto
- Distributed by: Nikkatsu
- Release date: September 6, 1967
- Running time: 89 minutes
- Country: Japan
- Language: Japanese

Massacre Gun (みな殺しの拳銃, Minagoroshi no kenjū) is a 1967 Japanese yakuza film directed by Yasuharu Hasebe.

== Plot ==
Yakuza hitman Ryuichi Kuroda is forced into executing his lover on the orders of Boss Azakawa (Takashi Kanda). His brother, aspiring boxer Saburo Kuroda (Jirō Okazaki) in a failed attempt to confront Azakawa, ends up having his fists broken and potential boxing career destroyed. Ryuichi decides to break away from Azakawa, and has his bar raided in retaliation. Ryuichi decides to takes over some of Azakawa's smaller businesses by force.

Azakawa decides to strike back by killing a pachinko arcade operator who willingly went over to the Kurodas and sending his body in a coffin, which also contains a bomb that Ryuichi defuses. Following this, Azakawa blackmails a bowling alley operator now answering to the Kurodas into luring Ryuichi and the middle brother, Eiji into an ambush which they promptly escape from. After Kuroda spares the operator's life, Azakawa switches tactics and kidnaps Saburo. Ryuichi attempts to negotiate for his release by visiting Azakawa's manor, but he has Eiji sneak in and kill the guards just before the handover. However, just before the escape, Eiji kills Azakawa for good measure.

Later, when Eiji attempts to sleep with Azakawa's mistress, he is caught and killed by Azakawa's gunmen now under control of Azakawa's successor Ryuichi's old mentor, Shirasaka. Ryuichi then decides to face down Shirasaka and challenges him to a final showdown at an under-construction highway. During the attack, Ryuichi whittles down Shirasaki's accompanying gunman before facing Shirasaki man-to-man. Both men end up killing each other in the resulting firefight, as the film ends on Saburo running towards the site of the duel.

== Cast ==
- Joe Shishido as Ryūichi Kuroda
- Tatsuya Fuji as Eiji Kuroda
- Jirō Okazaki as Saburo Kuroda
- Hideaki Nitani as Shirasaka
- Tamaki Sawa as Shino
- Yoko Yamamoto as Aiko
- Takashi Kanda as Akazawa
- Ken Sanders as Chico
- Jūkei Fujioka as Kanayama
- Ryoji Hayama as Midorikawa

== Production ==
Massacre Gun was written by veteran studio screenwriter Ryūzō Nakanishi and credited to him and Takashii Fujii. Fujii was a pseudonym for director Yasuharu Hasebe.

== Release ==
Massacre Gun was released theatrically in Japan on September 6, 1967. The film has receive retrospective release at film festivals, such as the 2012 Fantasia Film Festival where the film received its North American premiere. Massacre Gun was released on DVD and blu-ray by Arrow Video on April 6, 2015.

== Reception ==
PopMatters gave Massacre Gun a five out of ten rating, noting that the film's story was "as formulaic as possible" and that the film was " all very stylish, and that’s what director Yasuharu Hasebe offers to make the predictable story at least worth looking at." In Video Librarian, a review noted that the film contains "stylish set pieces that don't make much sense but look great" and that Massacre Gun "is a film where style is the substance, an entertaining Japanese gangster noir that will likely be appreciated by fans of Quentin Tarantino."

== See also ==
- Takeo Kimura filmography
