= Kanto Wanderer =

- Directed by: Seijun Suzuki
- Written by: Yasutarō Yagi; Taiko Hirabayashi (Novel)
- Produced by: Kenzō Asada
- Starring: Akira Kobayashi; Chieko Matsubara; Daizaburo Hirata; Hiroko Itō
- Cinematography: Shigeyoshi Mine
- Edited by: Akira Suzuki
- Music by: Masayoshi Ikeda
- Distributed by: Nikkatsu
- Release date: November 16, 1963
- Running time: 92 minutes
- Country: Japan
- Language: Japanese

Kanto Wanderer (関東無宿, Kantō mushuku; aka The Woman Sharper and Kanto Vagabonds) is a 1963 Japanese yakuza film directed by Seijun Suzuki and starring Akira Kobayashi, Chieko Matsubara, Daizaburo Hirata and Hiroko Itō. It was a programme picture produced by the Nikkatsu Company to fill out the second half of a double bill with Shohei Imamura's The Insect Woman. The film was based on a novel by Taiko Hirabayashi and had been previously adapted to the screen as Song from the Underworld (1956) by Suzuki's mentor, Hiroshi Noguchi. The story involves Katsuta, a yakuza member who falls in love and is torn between giri (duty) and ninjo (humanity). The Kanto of the title refers to a large plain on which Tokyo is located.

== Plot ==
Three schoolgirls are infatuated with a yakuza, Katsuta, of the Izu Clan. They meet another yakuza, "Diamond" Fuyu, of the rival Yoshida clan. As he gets a tattoo, two of the girls become squeamish and run off but Hanako, the best friend of the daughter of Sota Izu, boss of the Izu clan, stays to watch. She is intrigued with the yakuza world. Fuyu takes her to an illegal gambling den where Tetsu, a dealer, takes a liking to her. The police raid the den and Hanako is arrested but let off with a warning. Later, Tetsu runs into Hanako on the street and convinces her to help him pull a variant of the badger game, a scam in which, with the promise of sex, she is to lure a man to a hotel room where Tetsu will extort money from him by threat of blackmail. The scam fails when the man chases Testu off and Hanako is left stranded with the man.

Katsuta chances upon Tatsuko, a con artist who he had encountered four years earlier when he had exposed her and her partner in a scam. Her partner had slashed him across the face in their escape and he bore the resulting scar in fond remembrance of her. Word that Hanako has gone missing reaches Katsuta and he inquires as to her whereabouts from Tetsu who feigns ignorance. They search for her without success and end up at a hotel. Katsuta suspects a gambling game there is fixed, but Tetsu insists on partaking and Katsuta follows. He again meets Tatsuko whose husband, Hachi Okaru, is winning the game by looking at the cards in the reflection of a cigarette case. When the others leave Okaru challenges Katsuta to a game and wins again by cheating.

Diamond, who was in hiding with Tatsuko, his sister, emerges and demands to know what happened to Hanako, but Katsuta cannot tell him. Katsuta and Tatsuko fight their feelings for one another. Tensions rise between the Izu and Yoshida clan and Sato Izu begins to suspect Katsuta of disloyalty. Katsuta murders a group of rude gambler parlor attendees. Realizing he has nothing left to lose, he slays his way to a rival boss, demanding he give his fealty to Izu. When Izu is killed by Fuyu making Katsuta's earlier actions moot, Katsuta states his actions were nonetheless honorable.

== Cast ==
- Akira Kobayashi as Mitsuo Katsuta
- Chieko Matsubara as Tokiko Izu
- Daizaburo Hirata as "Diamond" Fuyu
- Hiroko Itō as Tatsuko Iwata
- Sanae Nakahara as Hanako Yamada
- Chikako Shin as Matsue Ichikawa
- Taiji Tonoyama as Sota Izu
- Toru Abe as Dairyu Yoshida
- Keisuke Noro as Tetsu Bikkuri
- Yūnosuke Itō as Hachi Okaru

== Production ==
The Nikkatsu Company assigned Kanto Wanderer to contract director Seijun Suzuki. It was his first ninkyo eiga, or chivalry film. It was also a programme picture, a quickly made, low-budget film, designed to be screened after Shohei Imamura's The Insect Woman. Kanto Wanderer was based on a serial written by Taiko Hirabayashi published in the Asahi Shimbun. Hiroshi Noguchi, Suzuki's mentor, had previously adapted the story as Song from the Underworld (1956). Suzuki was apprehensive about remaking a film by Noguchi but his producer Kenzō Asada assured him that it was better a former assistant directed it.

Suzuki accepted the assignment on September 24, 1963, and began location scouting the same day. The studio also assigned matinée idol Akira Kobayashi and Chieko Matsubara to the lead roles. Suzuki and his collaborators had more sway with the remaining parts. They suggested many actress for the role of Tatsuko Iwata, such as Yoshie Mizutani and Yukiji Asaoka, but all were turned down. Suzuki argued frequently with the studio on the subject. The studio suggested Minako Osanai, a famous television star, but Suzuki warned them against it as he felt her small face would not carry over to the large screen format. Two days before filming was scheduled to begin, art director Takeo Kimura suggested Hiroko Itō to Suzuki and she was selected.

Shooting began on October 5, on location in Shinagawa. Kobayashi appeared on set wearing what Suzuki later described as Brezhnevian artificial eyebrows. A dismayed Asada told Suzuki, "Tell Akira to cut that out." Suzuki suggested they leave them so as not to immediately antagonize Kobayashi and the eyebrows remained. Since the film was to be shown immediately following the main feature, and Suzuki felt that all Nikkatsu films followed the same formula (the lead falls in love, kills the bad guy and "gets the girl"), he familiarized himself with The Insect Woman's actors, director and his approach and then approached similar scenes from a different angle in Kanto Wanderer. Filming was completed on November 10. The music was completed on the 12th and the dubbing was done over the 13th and 14th.
