= Sayaka Yoshino =

Japanese model and actress

- 吉野 紗香
- Born: Tokyo, Japan
- Occupations: Actress, model, media persona
- Years active: 1994–present
- Children: 1

Sayaka Yoshino (吉野 紗香, Yoshino Sayaka) is a Japanese award winning model, acclaimed actress, and media persona. Often regarded by the media as the original genre definer of the popular mixture of a teen fashion & high fashion model, media idol, actor and media persona originally known in Japan as "Chaidoru" (a word play on child and idol), she has appeared in numerous television drama's, hundreds of prime time shows, award-winning & cult classic films, roles in acclaimed theater and record setting internet drama productions.

== Early life ==
Born in Tokyo and raised in both Tokyo and Chiba, Yoshino as a child wondered how children appeared on TV programs, until she learnt that to be cast she would need to a talent agency / agent. Without her parents foreknowledge, she sent out applications (including a school yearbook photograph of herself) to agencies advertised in newspapers until one responded with a request to meet and interview in person. As a young girl not able to travel to the meeting alone, Yoshino informed her mother and was escorted to the agency interview of which she was later offered to join.

== Career ==
Yoshino began her career in 1994 after being selected in a public audition by a talent agency that she applied herself. After gaining popularity as a model appearing in fashion magazines, winning reader polled contests, and being cast in spoken roles for television commercials, she was cast in the first feature film Maborosi by film director Koreeda Hirokazu. At about the same time she began appearing as a guest actress on television drama's and started to take on more extended roles in other feature films. Yoshino was cast in character designer and director Keita Amemiya's fantasy - action film, Moon Over Tao and again in Koreeda's second feature film, After Life, of which garnered critical acclaim both in Japan and abroad. Yoshino's growing popularity defined a new phenomenon, as a young multi-faceted idol, which the media coined "Chaidol" (combining the words "child" and "idol").

== Personal life ==
Yoshino is known as an avid dog lover and animal rights advocate. She has participated in charity events promoting social awareness of dog shelters and independently promoted animal rights through her webcast show "Hello From Earth" focusing on dog shelters seeking to find foster families. Yoshino has also used her webcast show to focus on Fair Trade and has participated in public Fair Trade events. She has also shared that she is currently developing her own ethical / sustainable fashion brand.

Since Yoshino had not finished her high school studies due to difficulty juggling her commitments as an actress / TV personality and a student, she later worked to complete the requirements to receive the Certificate for Students Achieving the Proficiency Level of Upper Secondary School Graduates (similar to the GED in the United States). Throughout her studies, she publicly shared her progress and personal feelings on the subject on her internet blog, and successfully received the certificate of completion of Upper Secondary School Graduates (High School) and made news headlines.

In 2012, it was announced that Yoshino had married her partner / boyfriend (a U.S. citizen) in 2010.

In April 2017, it was announced Yoshino held a wedding ceremony after having registered her union with her husband 7 years before. Images of her as a bride and a message of gratitude was made public.

On 20 March 2021, she announced on her blog that she gave birth to their first child, a baby boy on 15 February.

== Filmography ==
=== Film ===
Year	Title	Role	Notes
1995	Maborosi	Young Yumiko (Teenage Girl)	
1996	Jigoku-do Reikai Tsushin	Kana Azuki (Teenager with pet sacred beast)	
1997	Moon Over Tao	Renge (Teenage Ninja Combatant)	
1998	After Life	Kana Yoshino (Teenage Girl)	
2000	Boogie Pop and Others	Touka Miyashita / Boogie Pop (School Girl/Grim Reeper)	
2002	Ninpuu Sentai Hurricaneger Shushutto The Movie	Princess Laina (Extraterrestrial Princess)	
2004	The Big Slaughter Club: The Final Slaughter	Misato (Telekinetic School Girl)	
2006	Tannka	Special Appearance / Cameo	
2007	trash words SKIP CITY INTERNATIONAL D-Cinema FESTIVAL, Short Film Nominee	Naomi (College Office Worker)	
2008	Wakuraba Nagarete (Rolling Stone)	Teco (Cafe Waitress)	
2008	Tokyo Neo Mahiya (1-3)	Sona (Korean Gang Member)	
2008	Aihyôka: Chimanako (Cursed Songs: The Bloodshot)	Kaya (Marine Researcher)	
2008	Immoral	Kaneko Kazuhara (Police Sergeant)	
2008	Kiseki no Umi (The Ocean of Miracles)	Akemi (School Teacher)	
2009	Aihyôka: Numeri (Cursed Songs: The Book Of The New Spawn)	Kaya (Marine Researcher)	
2010	The Coach: 40 Year-Old Figure Skater	Sanae Katagiri (Ice Skater)	
2013	Zeus no Houtei (Court of Zeus)	Zuzumoto (business woman / character witness)	
2014	Nôka no yome: Anata ni aitakute (Farmer's Bride: Wanting to See You)	Kei (Bar Hostess)	

=== Television ===
Year	Title	Role	Notes
1995	Juukou B-Fighter	Mina	Episode 16 / TV Asahi
1995	Papa Survival		TBS
1995	Heart ni S		Episode 19 "Doctor" / Fuji Televsision
1995	Mokuyono Kaidan・Kaiki Club		Fuji Televsision
1995	Ninshin desuyo 2		Fuji Televsision
1996	Shori no Megami	Ryoko Okamoto	Fuji Televsision
1996	Tokyo 23 Ku no Onna, Meguroku no Onnai		Fuji Televsision
1996	Yonimo Kimyona Monogatari, Autumn 96' Special: Kabe no Shosetsu		Fuji Televsision
1996	Fuyuno Hotaru		NHK
1997	Shin-D "Too Young!!		Nihon Televsision
1997	TV Novel: Aguri	Machiko Yamaoka	NHK
1997	Sorega Kotaeda!	Noriko Ishihara	Fuji Televsision
1998	Days	Yuriko Takeuchi	Fuji Televsision
1998	Shonen・15: Kireteshimatta Kokoro Sakebi		TV Asahi
1998	Shonentachi	Rika	NHK
1999	Seven Samurai, J-ke no hanran		Episode 7 / Asahi Broadcast
2000	Kino no Teki wa kyono Tomo	Miki Ogawa	NHK
2000-2001	Tekkouki Mikazuki	Luna Tical	Fuji Televsision
2001	Kochira Daisan Syakaibu	Mei Kikuhara	TBS
2002	Moshichino Jikenbo Fushigisoushi	Oshino	NHK
2002	Shio Karubi		Episode 2 / TV Kanagawa & Kyoto Broadcast
2003	Onyado Kawasemi		NHK
2004	Reikan Bus Guide Jikenbo	Yumi Toda	Episode 10 / TV Asahi
2005	Mito Kōmon		Episode 35 / TBS
2006	Tsunagareta Ashita	Akemi Nakamichi	NHK
2006	Kaikan Shokunin	Chiharu Harajima	Episode 5 / TV Asahi
2006	Tobosha Orin	Mai	Episode 4 / TV Tokyo
2007	Kagerō no Tsuji Inemuri Iwane Edo Zōshi	Okane	Episode 6 / NHK
2008	Mitsumei Kangetusumigiri	Oyu	Episode 2 & 5 / TV Tokyo
2008	Otome	Masayo	Episode 40 / TV Asahi
2008	Kippari!!	Kasumi Yamada	Episode 10-24 / TBS
2010	Hanchô: Jinnansho Azumihan	Saori Yuki	Season 3, Episode 7 / TBS
2012	Garo: Makai Senki	Spell Master Mio	Episode 19 / TBS
2012	Don't Shoot Me Mr! - Untold Stories of Gravure Models	Sayaka Yoshino	Episode 7 / TV Tokyo

=== Television Shows / Variety TV Programming ===
Oricon (notable / often among the most regarded media data sites / companies in Japan) displays a publicly available record of Sayaka Yoshino since the year 2000 appearing in over 400 television programs and drama's often prime time. https://www.oricon.co.jp/prof/200797/tv/

Oricon however, does not appear to account nor list regional and or later national broadcast through regional outlet programming such as those for Osaka, Fukuoka or other major regional broadcasting outlets including cable TV programming. Some notable regular prime time programs appearances and spot appearances are verified through Oricon and or listed on Japanese media, interviews or magazine photography bios of Ms. Yoshino are:

- Oha Suta (TV Tokyo, Oha Girl: Member Number 5)
- Animal Wonders (TBS)
- Discovery of the World’s Mysteries! (TBS)
- P-Stock (Fuji TV)
- Sotoroke (Yomiuri TV)
- Q-To Science (Osaka TV / TBS)
- Koi Boy Koi Girl (Fuji TV)
- Ai no Apron (Apron of Love) – TV Asahi
- TV Champion (TV Tokyo)
- Otoru Sanma Goten (NTV)
- Sekai Ururun Taizaiki (MBS / TBS)
- Hakkutu Aru Aru Daijiten(Fuji TV)
- Mayonaka No Oukoku (NHK)

Additionally, Ms. Yoshino is known to have been very prominent in television appearances in the mid-late 1990s, possibly more so than her appearances in the 2000s and to date as some of the above television above (such as Sotoroke, P-Stock, or Oha Suta when Ms. Yoshino appeared on Oha Suta when the show began in 1997).

While records of television show programming appearances previous to the year 2000 are not encompassing nor readily available in either English or Japanese media, nor available in online resources, nor television station programming records through searches within the station's sites. Additional verifiable sources for television programming appearances during the mid-late 1990s and or the 2000s and to date, would be valuable (note humbly to the Wikipedia community or greater web community or otherwise, if such we may be able to provide).

=== Video Games & animation ===
Year	Title	Role	Notes
1999	Momotarou Dentetsu V	Appears as herself	Hudson
2005	Grandia III	Dana (Voice)	Square Enix
2008	Michiko & Hatchin	Rita Ozzetti (Voice)	Fuji TV Affiliate

=== Theatre ===
Year	Title	Role	Notes
1998	Big -dreams come true-	Cynthia	a Fuji Television 40 Anniversary Production
1998	S.C.NANSHO Flag-Raising Performance: Funk-a-Step	Sayaka Yoshino (herself)	a Fuji Television & Nippon Broadcasting Production
2003	Netorare Sosuke	Suzuko	Written by Kōhei Tsuka, Directed by Ginnojô Yamazaki
2004	Akane Sora	Okimi	Shinbashi Enbujō Performance, Written by Ichiriki Yamamoto, Directed by Toru Emori
2006	Tokyo Toshindai -her daily extra-ordinaries-	Maiko	a Spacecraft Group Production
2006	Angel Gate -Premonition of Spring-	Mami	Written &, Directed by Yoshikazu Yokoyama, a Fuji TV & Tokyo FM Production
2007	Teo Agero! Kenko Gotoda	Asuka	Tsunku Town Theater 2nd Performance / a TNX Production
2007	Angel Gate	Mami	Written &, Directed by Sayaka Asai, a Fuji TV Production
2007	Arashi no Yoru ni	Mei	Written by Yuuichi Kimura, Directed by Yoshikazu Yokoyama, a Baku Enterprise Production
2008	Hanabana shiki Ichizoku	Kyoko Hiyoshi	Written by Kaoru Morimoto, Directed by Fukuko Ishii, a TV Asahi & CAT Production
2009	Romantic Life	Mariya Nakagami (a Transgender Female)	Written by Akie Yoshikawa, Directed by Hirokazu Yamaguchi, a Butchy Musha Production
2009	Tokyo Alice	Liliko Otoichi	Written by Chiya Toriko, Directed by Ayako Ooki, a Upfront & Spacecraft Production
2010	Hanabana shiki Ichizoku	Kyoko Hiyoshi	Director Fukuko Ishii, a Nippon Broadcasting & CAT Production
2011	Ekoda Sketch	Time Traveller	Writer & Director Kaoru Asakura, a Bunka Tsushin 60th Anniversary Production
2015	Kurokute Akai Hana	Akemi	Writer & Director Kazushige Itoh, Theater Green Production
