= Pistol Opera =

2001 film by Seijun Suzuki

- Directed by: Seijun Suzuki
- Written by: Kazunori Itō; Takeo Kimura
- Produced by: Ikki Katashima; Satoru Ogura
- Starring: Makiko Esumi; Sayoko Yamaguchi; Kirin Kiki; Mikijiro Hira; Masatoshi Nagase
- Cinematography: Yonezo Maeda
- Edited by: Akira Suzuki
- Music by: Kazufumi Kodama
- Production company: Branded to Kill: Pistol Opera Production Committee
- Distributed by: Shochiku
- Release date: October 27, 2001
- Running time: 112 minutes
- Country: Japan
- Language: Japanese

Pistol Opera (ピストルオペラ, Pisutoru Opera) is a 2001 Japanese film directed by Seijun Suzuki and starring Makiko Esumi.

== Cast ==
- Makiko Esumi as Miyuki Minazuki, a.k.a. Stray Cat, a.k.a. Killer No. 3
- Sayoko Yamaguchi as Sayoko Uekyo
- Kirin Kiki as Minazuki's grandmother
- Mikijiro Hira as Goro Hanada, a.k.a. The Champ, a.k.a. the former Killer No. 1
- Hanae Kan as Sayoko, the young girl
- Kenji Sawada as Assassin NO.2
- Jan Woudstra as Painless Surgeon, a.k.a. No. 5
- Masatoshi Nagase as the Man in Black, a.k.a. Dark Horse
- Haruko Kato as Shizuka Orikuchi

== Production ==
Hanada is not played by Joe Shishido this time, but by Mikijiro Hira; Suzuki has said that the original intent was for Shishido to play the character again, but that the film's producer, Satoru Ogura, wanted Hira to play the character instead. The reasons for this are still unclear.

== Reception ==
On the review aggregator website Rotten Tomatoes, 78% of 18 critics' reviews are positive, with an average rating of 6.7/10. Metacritic, which uses a weighted average, assigned the film a score of 75 out of 100, based on 8 critics, indicating "generally favorable" reviews.
