= Akatsuki no Dassō =

Escape at Dawn
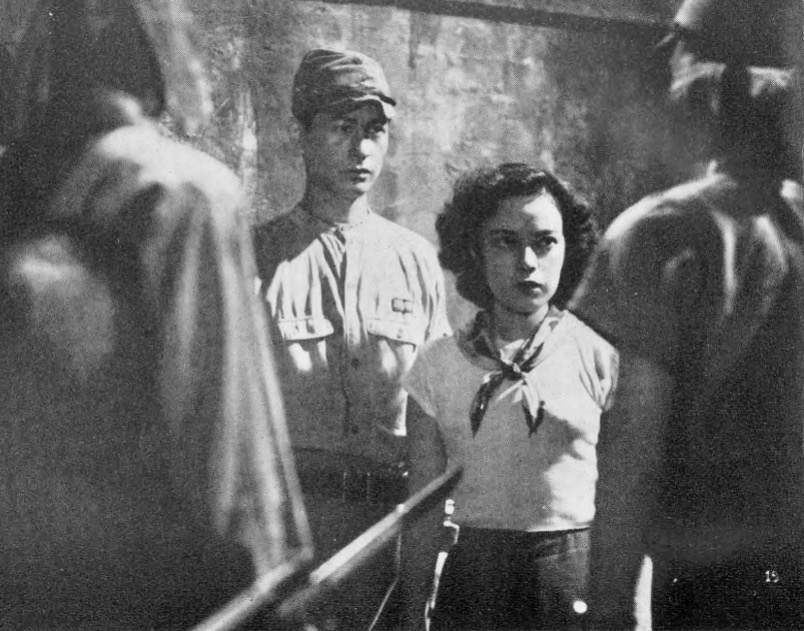
- Theatrical release poster
- Directed by: Senkichi Taniguchi
- Screenplay by: Senkichi Taniguchi; Akira Kurosawa
- Story by: Yasujiro Tamura
- Based on: Story of a Prostitute by Taijiro Tamura
- Produced by: Tomoyuki Tanaka
- Starring: Ryō Ikebe; Yoshiko "Shirley" Yamaguchi; Sakae Ozawa; Hajime Izu
- Cinematography: Akira Mimura
- Music by: Fumio Hayasaka
- Production companies: Shintoho; Toho
- Distributed by: Shintoho
- Release date: 8 January 1950 (Japan)
- Running time: 116 minutes
- Country: Japan
- Language: Japanese

Escape at Dawn (Japanese: 暁の脱走, Hepburn: Akatsuki no Dassō) is a 1950 Japanese anti-war film directed by Senkichi Taniguchi. Co-written by Taniguchi and Akira Kurosawa, the film is based on Story of a Prostitute by Taijiro Tamura. The film revolves around a tragic affair between a soldier involved in the Manchurian campaign and a prostitute.

The film received two awards at the Mainichi Film Concours and was later remade by Seijun Suzuki at Nikkatsu.

== Plot ==
Mikami, a Japanese soldier serving in China, is captured by Chinese forces. Although he is able to escape, he is treated with contempt by his peers. After falling in love with a prostitute named Harumi, she convinces him to desert the army and live with her.

== Cast ==
- Ryō Ikebe as Mikami
- Yoshiko Yamaguchi as Harumi
- Eitaro Ozawa as Adjutant
- Hajime Izu as Oda
- Haruo Tanaka as Noro
- Setsuko Wakayama as Kaoru

== Release ==
Escape at Dawn was released in Japan on 8 January 1950 where it was distributed by Shintoho.

== Reception ==
Escape at Dawn was ranked as the third-best Japanese film of 1950 by Kinema Junpo critics. The film received two awards at the Mainichi Film Concours: Best Cinematography and Best Sound.
