= Taiko Hirabayashi =

Japanese writer (1905-1972)

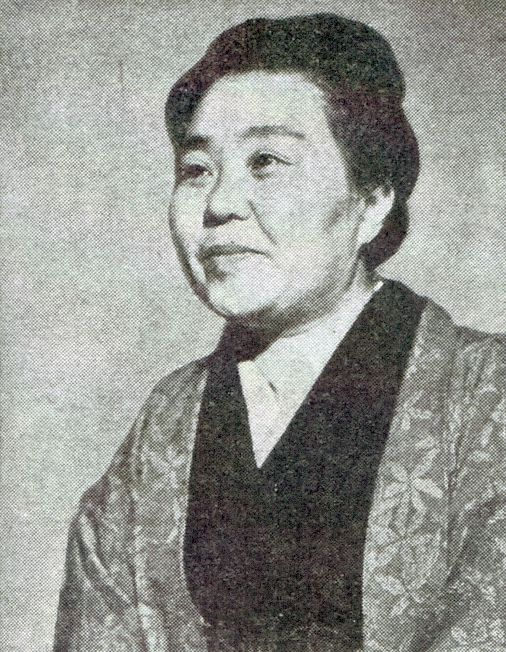
- Born: 3 October 1905; Suwa City, Nagano Prefecture, Japan
- Died: 17 February 1972 (aged 66)
- Occupation: Writer

Taiko Hirabayashi (平林 たい子, Hirabayashi Taiko; 3 October 1905 – 17 February 1972) was the pen-name of a Japanese writer. Her real name was Hirabayashi Tai.

== Biography ==
Hirabayashi resolved at the age of 12 to become a writer and also developed an interest in socialism at a young age. After graduating from the Suwa Women’s Higher School in 1922, she moved to Tokyo and began living with an anarchist named Torazo Yamamoto. They went to Korea together but returned after only one month. They were both arrested in the confusion and clampdowns following the 1923 Great Kantō earthquake and released on condition of leaving Tokyo. She eventually moved to Manchuria and was to give birth in a hospital in Dalian but the child lived for only twenty-four days, dying of malnutrition. Based on this personal experience, she wrote the short story In the Charity Hospital, which established her as a writer of proletarian literature.

She married the novelist and critic Jinji Kobori in 1927, but divorced him in 1955 after discovering that he had an illegitimate child. In 1946, she won the inaugural Women's Literature Prize with Kou iu onna.

After the war, she became a writer of "Tenko Bungaku" ("Conversion Literature", a controversial genre dealing with the renunciation of leftist beliefs) and showed conservative, anti-communist tendencies. Later, she was known to be a member of the Democratic Socialist Party.

Her writings were often modelled on her own life or contemporary authors but she also produced various social commentaries and essays. During the war, after receiving help from a gambler named Seiichi Ishiguro, she became interested in the world of the yakuza and also wrote novels with a chivalrous spirit such as Kokusatsu, Chitei no Uta and Nagurareru Aitsu. In 1967, she won the 7th Women's Literature Prize with Himitsu.

== Legacy ==
She was posthumously awarded the Japan Art Institute Prize and the Hirabayashi Taiko Prize was created in her honour.

There is a Hirabayashi Taiko Memorial Museum in Suwa City, Fukushima prefecture.

== Literary works ==
- Azakeru (嘲る, 1927) - Self-Mockery
- Seryoushitsu ni te (施療室にて, 1928) - In the Charity Hospital
- Shussen ni te (1946) - Diary of the End of the War
- Hitori yuku (一人行く, 1946) - I Walk Alone
- Mou chugoku hei (1946) - Blind Chinese Soldiers
- Kishi mojin (1946) - The Goddess of Children or Demon Goddess
- Kau iu onna (かういふ女, 1946) - This Kind of Woman
- Watashi ha ikiru (私は生きる, 1947) - I Mean to Live
- Kokusatsu (黒札) - Black Notes
- Chitei no uta (地底の歌, 1948) - Song from the Underworld
- Jinsei jikken (1948) - A Life Experiment
- Hito no inochi (1950) - A Man's Life
- Nagurareru aitsu (殴られるあいつ) - The Beaten Man
- Onigo bojin (鬼子母神) -
- Sabaku no hana (砂漠の花, 1957) - Flowers in a Desert
- Sono hito to tsuma (その人と妻) - The Man and His Wife
- Erudorado Akarushi (エルドラド明るし)
- Fumou (1962) - Sterility
- Kuroi Nenrei (1963) - The Black Age
- Haha to iu onna (1966) - A Woman to Call Mother
- Himitsu (秘密, 1967) - Secret -- won the Women's Literature Prize in 1968.

== See also ==
- Japanese literature
- List of Japanese authors
