= Isao Yamada =

Japanese Navy film director, graphic artist, and manga author

Isao Yamada (山田 勇男, Yamada Isao; born 1952 in Hokkaido) is a Japanese film director, graphic artist, and manga author.

== Career ==
Yamada started his artistic career by working at Shuji Terayama's theatre company, Tenjō Sajiki. In 1974, he was appointed as an artistic crew member in Terayama's feature-film, Denen ni Shisu (Pastoral: To Die in the Country, 1974). He also worked on Boxer (1977), Kusameikyu (Grass Labyrinth, 1979), Saraba Hakobune (Farewell to the Ark, 1982).

At the same time in Sapporo, Yamada started a film club, Gingagahou-sha Eiga Club, with his colleague Yumekichi Minatoya in 1977. Ever since his first 8mm film made for the club, Subaru no Yoru (An Incident of Night, 1977), was selected for the Pia Film Festival, he has been constantly working with 8mm films (and occasionally 16mm). Most of them are short 'private films' and named by himself 'Yamavicascope'. Since 1991, La Camera Gallery in Tokyo has produced regular duo-screenings of his films and the works by Yamazaki Mikio. In the filmography of Yamavicascope, the film-correspondences between Yamada and Yamazaki are titled as OUFUKU (Film Letter) I~V (1986~2006). In addition to screenings in Japan, Yamada's experimental art works have been featured at Cannes, Oberhausen, Stockholm and other film festivals. His feature-films are Anmonaito no sasayaki wo kiita (I've heard the Ammonite's Murmur:1992), Jouhatsu Tabinikki (The Soul Odyssey, 2003) based on the essay by Yoshiharu Tsuge, and Shutorumu unto Doranku (Sturm und Drang, 2014).

In addition to his work in cinema, Yamada works with the media of manga, painting and graphic design. His calligraphic font has been appointed for a number of publications and advertisement posters.

== Film works ==
There are more than one hundred short films produced by Yamada. The following is only a selected list and excludes the feature-films mentioned above, in chronological order.

- An Incident of Night (1977), 25min, colour, 8mm (selected for Pia Film Festival)
- Night Window (1978), 20min, colour, 8mm
- A Marine Barber (1980), 25min, colour, 8mm
- Way Home (1981), 25min, colour, 8mm (selected for the Berlin International Film Festival)
- Night of the Milky Way Railroad (1982), 45min, colour, 8mm
- The Fan of Spiral Shell (1983), 12min, colour, 16mm
- Sad Gadolf (1984), 20min, colour, 16mm
- All Alone (1985), 10min, colour, 8mm
- A Lion and Violet (1986), 65min, colour, 8mm (shot in USA)
- HINA (1987), 3min, colour, 8mm
- The Sketch of Snow (1988), 25min, colour, 8mm
- FLAMME (1989), 9min, colour, 8mm
- The Crown of Dreams (1990), 16min, colour, 16mm
- Recollect (1991), 17min, colour, 8mm
- Tokyo Dusk (1992), 33min, colour, 16mm
- A Moment Before both Eyes Memorize a Phenomenon (1993), 48min, colour, 8mm
- Tears of Socks (1994), 9min, colour, 8mm
- The Descendant of Androgynous (1995), 25min, colour, 8mm
- Fragmentation of Night (1996), 12min, B&W, 16mm
- Long Good-Bye (1997), 32min, B&W, 16mm
- I Have Been Looking at the Dream Continuously (1998), 20min, colour, 8mm
- Lemon (1999), 12min, colour, 8mm
- Moon Globe (2000), 28min, colour, 35mm (selected and bought by the 46th International Short Film Festival Oberhausen)
- PUZZLE (2001), 20min, B&W, 8mm,
- The Sun Which Shone Like a Pearl (2001), 15min, colour, 8mm (shot in France)
- Every Day (2002), 50min, colour, 8mm
- Suspicious Alley (2003), 22min, colour, 8mm
- Maiglöckchen (2004), 30min, B&W and colour, 8mm (shot in Germany)
- The North Glimmer (2004), 30min, colour, 8mm (shot in Sweden)
- Skeleton in the Boy's Arms (2005), 48min, colour, 8mm
- Fragilitat (2006), 25min, colour, 8mm (selected for the 52nd International Short Film Festival Oberhausen)
- Delicate Eyelashes (2007), 36min, B&W, 8mm (music by Simon Fisher Turner)
- Chocolate (2008), 20min, colour, 8mm
- Tokyo Nostalgia (2009), 32min, B&W, 8mm
- Winterreise / Winter Journey, (2010), 38min, B&W and colour, 8mm
- Despair Arabesque (2011), 34min, colour, 8mm
- Instant Memory (2012), 34min, colour, 8mm
- Looking for My Vision (2013), 32min, B&W and colour, 8mm
- Kioku / Reflection (2014), 23min, B&W, 8mm (selected and bought by the 61st International Short Film Festival Oberhausen)
- Mosaïque en Blanc (2015), 35min, B&W and colour, 8mm
- Strasse / Transient Passage (2016), 40min, B&W and colour, 8mm
- Apparition's Moment (2017), B&W, 8mm

== Art works ==
- Koutou Yakyoku - Aishuu no machi ni hoshi ga furu - Momoiro Tsukiyo hen / Red Gaslight Serenade - Stars Falling Down over the Nostalgic Town (1975)
- Aka Uogashi / Red Fish Riverside (1976)
- Hinata no Nioi / The Fragrance of Sunny Side (1992)
- Ukiyo / Floating World (1994)
- Tawamuro / À la Folie (1995)
- Utsubuse / Sur le Ventre (1998)
- Itazura / Mischief (2000)
- Michi kusa (2001)
- Midori kame / Green Turtle (2005)
- Fuyu no neko no nakigoe / The Creeping of A Winter Cat (2007)
- Dandizumu no namida / Tears of Dandyism (2008)
- Ningyo / Sirène (2009)
- Moeru youna orengi iro no senkou de kakomareta aoi yokogao / A Blue Profile Outlined by the Burning Orange Dim Light (2010)
- Watashi no Aoi Touno nakani Darega iruno / There is Someone in my Blue Tower (2011)
- Gozen sanjini rousoku no higa aozameru / The Candle Light Turning Blue at 3:00 am (2013)

== See also ==
- Shuji Terayama
- Tenjō Sajiki
- Akira Uno
- Yoshiharu Tsuge
- Morio Agata
- Tengai Amano
- Simon Fisher Turner
- International Short Film Festival Oberhausen
- Cannes Film Festival
