= Maborosi =

Maboroshi
- Directed by: Hirokazu Kore-eda
- Screenplay by: Yoshihisa Ogita
- Based on: Maboroshi no Hikari by Teru Miyamoto
- Produced by: Naoe Gozu
- Starring: Makiko Esumi; Tadanobu Asano; Akira Emoto; Sayaka Yoshino; Takashi Naito
- Cinematography: Masao Nakabori
- Edited by: Tomoyo Ōshima
- Music by: Chen Ming-chang
- Distributed by: Milestone Films
- Release dates: 1995 (Venice Film Festival); March 21, 1997 (Japan)
- Running time: 109 minutes
- Country: Japan
- Language: Japanese

Maborosi, known in Japan as Maboroshi no Hikari (Japanese: 幻の光; literally "phantasmic light", but best translated as 'a trick of the light'), is a 1995 Japanese drama film by director Hirokazu Kore-eda starring Makiko Esumi, Tadanobu Asano, and Takashi Naito. It is based on a novel by Teru Miyamoto.

Maborosi won a Golden Osella Award for Best Cinematography at the 1995 Venice Film Festival.

== Plot ==
Yumiko (Esumi) and Ikuo (Asano) are a young Osaka couple who have a new baby. One day Ikuo is walking along the railway tracks and is hit and killed by a train. It seems that he may have done this deliberately yet there is no apparent motive. A few years pass. Yumiko agrees to an arranged marriage with a widower, Tamio (Naitō), and she and Yuichi (her son, now played by Gohki Kashiyama) move to Tamio's house in a rustic village on the Sea of Japan coast.

A drunken spat over a bell Yumiko had given Ikuo just before he died causes Yumiko and Tamio to discuss their strong emotions for their lost loves. Shortly after, Yumiko follows a funeral procession and lingers at the crematorium, until Tamio arrives by car to pick her up, at which point she says she just wants to know why Ikuo killed himself. Tamio suggests that, like the will o' the wisps his father used to see, perhaps something just drew him away from life.

== Cast ==
- Makiko Esumi as Yumiko
- Takashi Naito as Tamio
- Tadanobu Asano as Ikuo
- Gohki Kashiyama as Yuichi
- Naomi Watanabe as Tomoko
- Midori Kiuchi as Michiko
- Akira Emoto as Yoshihiro
- Mutsuko Sakura as Tomeno
- Akai Hidekazu as Master
- Hiromi Ichida as Hatsuko
- Ren Osugi as Hiroshi, Yumiko's father
- Kikuko Hashimoto as Kiyo
- Sayaka Yoshino as young Yumiko
- Minori Terada as Detective
- Shuichi Harada as Cop
- Takashi Inoue as Driver

== Critical reception ==
On Rotten Tomatoes, Maborosi has a perfect approval rating of 100% based on 24 reviews, with an average score of 8.1/10. On Metacritic, the film is scored 92 out of a 100, based on 8 reviews. It garnered a positive reaction from critics upon its American release, and received two thumbs up from Siskel and Ebert on the April 12, 1997 episode of their program. Ebert further praised the film in his review for the Chicago Sun-Times, noting its "astonishing beauty and sadness" and the influence of Japanese filmmaker Yasujiro Ozu. It was later included on Siskel and Ebert's "Best Films of 1997" episode in January 1998.

== See also ==
- List of films with a 100% rating on Rotten Tomatoes, a film review aggregator website

== Bibliography ==
- Guthmann, Edward (1996-11-29). "FILM REVIEW -- The Delicate House of 'Maborosi': Japanese film a lovely meditation on meaning of life". San Francisco Chronicle. Archived from the original on November 22, 2011.
- Thomas, Kevin (1996-10-26). "Maborosi: 'Maborosi' Takes Powerful Journey of Spirit". The Hartford Courant. Archived from the original on 2011-06-12.
- Thompson, Nathaniel (2006) [2002]. DVD Delirium: The International Guide to Weird and Wonderful Films on DVD; Volume 1 Redux. Godalming, England: FAB Press. pp. 453–454. ISBN 1-903254-39-6.
