= Yumiko Nogawa =

Japanese actress

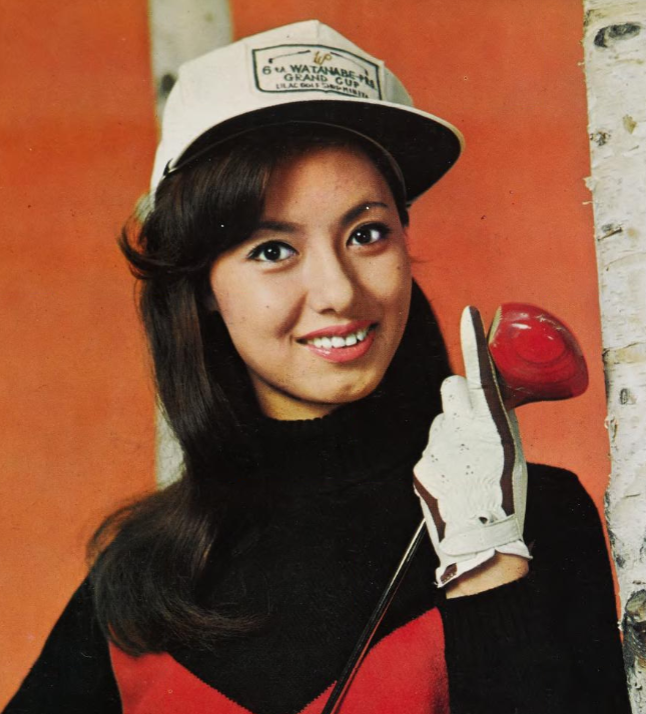
- Born: August 30, 1944 (age 81)
- Occupation: Actress

Yumiko Nogawa (野川由美子, Nogawa Yumiko; born August 30, 1944) is a Japanese actress born in Kyoto, Japan. She has starred in several movies, notably Gate of Flesh (1964), part of a trilogy of films she made with director Seijun Suzuki. Including Story of a Prostitute (1965) and Carmen from Kawachi (1966), these films are known as Nogawa's "Flesh Trilogy". Nogawa has appeared in numerous films in Japan, including director Nagisa Oshima's The Pleasures of the Flesh (1965) and Zatoichi and the Fugitives (1968), the eighteenth film in the Zatoichi series. She has also appeared in television series on Nippon Television, TV Tokyo, Fuji TV, and NHK.

== Filmography ==
- Gate of Flesh (1964) - Maya
- Kunoichi ninpō (1964) - Sen hime
- Story of a Prostitute (1965) - Harumi
- The Pleasures of the Flesh (1965) - Hitomi
- Carmen from Kawachi (1966) - Carmen
- A Certain Killer (1967) - Keiko
- Daimon Otokode Shinitai (1969)
- Battles Without Honor and Humanity: Final Episode (1974) - Kaoru Sugita
- Hokuriku Proxy War (1977)
- Okinawan Boys (1983)
- Ruten no umi (1990) - Fusae Matsuzaka
- The Geisha House (1999) - Michiko
- The Sea Is Watching (2002) - Omine
- The Book Peddler (2016) - Sachi Toda

== Television ==
- Hissatsu Shiokinin (1973) - Okin
- Tasukenin Hashiru (1974)
- Choshichiro Edo Nikki (1983–91)
- Dokuganryū Masamune (1987) - Asahi no kata
- Last Cinderella (2013) - Setsuko Takenouchi
