= Gate of Flesh =

1964 film by Seijun Suzuki

- Directed by: Seijun Suzuki
- Written by: Taijiro Tamura; Goro Tanada
- Produced by: Kaneo Iwai
- Starring: Joe Shishido; Satoko Kasai; Yumiko Nogawa
- Cinematography: Shigeyoshi Mine
- Music by: Naozumi Yamamoto
- Distributed by: Nikkatsu
- Release dates: 31 May 1964 (Japan); 11 December 1964 (U.S.)
- Running time: 119 minutes
- Country: Japan
- Languages: Japanese; English

Gate of Flesh (Japanese: 肉體の門, Hepburn: Nikutai no mon) is a 1964 Japanese film based on a novel by Taijiro Tamura and directed by Seijun Suzuki. The first of Suzuki's "flesh trilogy" (followed by Story of a Prostitute and Carmen from Kawachi), the series is considered the "crowning achievement" of his period working at the production house Nikkatsu. The film is viewed as a direct and allegorical critique of Japan's Occupation and subsequent development, which rather than breaking with the country's pre-war militaristic, authoritarian social structures only sees their reconstitution in the post-war period.

== Plot ==
In an impoverished and burnt out Tokyo ghetto of post-World War II Japan, a band of prostitutes defend their territory, squatting in a bombed-out building. Somehow they eke out a living together. Forming a sort of family in an environment where everyone (American soldiers and Japanese yakuza) is a potential antagonist, the girls cajole each other, and ruthlessly punish any of their group who violate the cardinal rule—no falling in love. A new girl, Maya (Yumiko Nogawa), joins their group and learns the trade. An ex-soldier, Shintaro Ibuki (Joe Shishido), is shot nearby and holes up with the girls. Each of them starts to crave Ibuki, placing strains on the group. Maya feels it worst, seeing him as replacement for her brother (who died in Borneo). She takes him for a night of drunken revelry, and both are ostracized. Agreeing to run away together, he is shot in a double-cross, and she is left as she was at the beginning of the film—alone and hopeless.

== Production ==
A conceptual sketch by production designer Takeo Kimura for Gate of Flesh (1964)

Planned as an "adult release" (Japanese films were classified by the country's film board as "general release" or "adult"), the usual pace of production at Nikkatsu (10 days pre-production, 25 days shooting, three days post-production) allowed Suzuki and his innovative production designer Takeo Kimura precious little time to construct sets to recreate post-war firebombed Tokyo. Sets were slapped together on the backlot using materials purloined from studio warehouses, and theatrical set design techniques which could compromise the film's "realism." The resulting production has been lauded for its resulting visual flair.

Most female actresses at Nikkatsu refused to work in the film due to the nudity and subject matter, so the cast's female roles were filled by actresses from outside the studio.

== Cast ==
- Joe Shishido as Shintaro Ibuki
- Yumiko Nogawa as Borneo Maya
- Kōji Wada as Abe
- Tomiko Ishii as Roku
- Kayo Matsuo as Mino
- Misako Tominaga as Machiko
- Keisuke Noro as Ishii
- Chico Lourant as Catholic Priest
- Isao Tamagawa as Horidome
- Satoko Kasai as Komasa Sen

== Other versions ==
There are three other film versions (1948), (1977), (1988 starring Katase Rino), and a recent 2008 TV drama series.
