= Ken Yamauchi =

Japanese actor

- Born: December 9, 1943; Tokyo, Japan
- Died: September 24, 2011 (aged 67)
- Occupation: Actor

Ken Yamauchi (山内賢, Yamauchi Ken) was a Japanese actor. He died of pneumonia in 2011.
