= Jazz Musume Tanjō =

Jazz musume tanjō
- Japanese movie poster
- Directed by: Masahisa Sunohara
- Starring: Chiemi Eri; Yujiro Ishihara; Taiji Tonoyama; Isamu Kosugi
- Distributed by: Nikkatsu
- Release date: April 3, 1957 (Japan)
- Running time: 77-78 minutes
- Country: Japan
- Language: Japanese

Jazz musume tanjō (Japanese: ジャズ娘誕生, Hepburn: Jazu musume tanjō), also known as Birth of a Jazz Maiden, is a 1957 Konicolor Japanese film directed by Masahisa Sunohara.

== Cast ==
- Chiemi Eri
- Yujiro Ishihara
- Taiji Tonoyama
- Isamu Kosugi
