= Sayoko Yamaguchi =

Japanese model and actress (1949–2007)

- Yamaguchi c. 2001
- Born: September 19, 1949; Yokohama, Japan
- Died: August 14, 2007 (aged 57); Tokyo, Japan
- Occupations: Model, actress

Sayoko Yamaguchi (Japanese: 山口小夜子, September 19, 1949 – August 14, 2007) was a Japanese model and actress. She was known for her black hair, distinctive makeup, white skin, red lip makeup and for her clothes inspired by Japanese culture.

== Early life ==
Yamaguchi was born in Yokohama and graduated from Sugino Gakuen's Dressmaker Gakuin design school in Tokyo.

== Career ==
Yamaguchi broke into the international modeling industry in the 1970s. She was one of the first Asian models to be featured in the world's top fashion shows and magazines. She made her debut in Paris in 1972, and went on to work in New York City and other international cities.

In 1977, Newsweek named her one of the world's top six fashion models. Also that year, she was featured on the cover of Steely Dan's Aja album, photographed by Hideki Fujii.

Yamaguchi went on to continue her career as a film and theater actress, as well as a costume designer.

== Death ==
Yamaguchi died aged 57, on August 14, 2007, of acute pneumonia. In 2015, she was the subject of a posthumous documentary, Kōri no hanabi Sayoko Yamaguchi (Ice Fireworks Sayoko Yamaguchi).

== Filmography ==
- Carol (1974, documentary) – Self
- ピーターソンの鳥 (Peterson's Bird) (1976) – Keiko
- 杳子 (Yuko) (1977) – Sayako
- Lost Love (1978) – Asuka Yamazaki
- 四季の追想 (Reminiscences of the Four Seasons) (1979, short)
- Fashion (1980, TV), "Kansai in New York" – Self
- Fruits of Passion (1981) – Sakuya
- Rikyū (1989) – Chacha
- 石の花 (Stone Flowers) (1989, documentary short) – Self
- T-CITY (1993, video short) – Woman
- Pistol Opera (2001) – Sayoko Uekyo
- Soundtrack (2002) – Red monster
- Matouqin Nocturne (2007) – Zarome
- Kōri no hanabi Sayoko Yamaguchi (Ice Fireworks Sayoko Yamaguchi) (2015, posthumous documentary) – Self
