= Masahisa Sunohara =

Japanese film director

Masahisa Sunohara (春原 政久, Sunohara Masahisa, 3 April 1906 – 31 May 1997) was a Japanese film director.

== Filmography ==
Title	Date
Ai no Ikka	1941
Umi no tora[2]	1945
Shichiiro no Hana	1950
Jazz Musume Tanjō	1957
Frankie Buchan no Ah Gunkanki	1957
Ijiwaru Basan	1967
Ken-chan Toko-chan	1970-1971
