= The Flower and the Angry Waves =

- Directed by: Seijun Suzuki
- Written by: Keiichi Abe; Kazuro Funabashi; Takeo Kimura
- Produced by: Takeo Yanagawa
- Starring: Akira Kobayashi; Tamio Kawaji; Chieko Matsubara; Osamu Takizawa
- Cinematography: Kazue Nagatsuka
- Edited by: Kō Suzuki
- Music by: Hajime Okumura
- Distributed by: Nikkatsu
- Release date: February 8, 1964
- Running time: 92 minutes
- Country: Japan
- Language: Japanese

The Flower and the Angry Waves (花と怒濤, Hana to dotō) is a 1964 Japanese film directed by Seijun Suzuki.

== Synopsis ==
A young yakuza in love with the girl who's to marry his clan oyabun, kidnaps the girl before fleeing with her. In Tokyo, he hides under the identity of a worker while the young woman becomes a waitress in a restaurant.

== Cast ==
- Akira Kobayashi – Kikuji Ogata
- Tamio Kawaji – Kenji Yoshimura
- Chieko Matsubara
- Naoko Kubo
- Kaku Takashina
- Shōki Fukae – Sakurada
- Osamu Takizawa
