= Carmen from Kawachi =

- Directed by: Seijun Suzuki
- Screenplay by: Katsumi Miki
- Based on: Carmen from Kawachi by Toko Kon
- Produced by: Shizuo Sakagami
- Starring: Yumiko Nogawa; Ruriko Ito; Chikako Miyagi; Michio Hino
- Cinematography: Shigeyoshi Mine
- Edited by: Akira Suzuki
- Music by: Taichirō Kosugi
- Distributed by: Nikkatsu
- Release date: February 5, 1966
- Running time: 89 minutes
- Country: Japan
- Language: Japanese

Carmen from Kawachi (河内カルメン, Kawachi Karumen) is a 1966 Japanese B movie directed by Seijun Suzuki for the Nikkatsu Corporation. It is Suzuki's third adaptation of a Toko Kon novel, following The Bastard and Stories of Bastards: Born Under a Bad Star.

== Cast ==
- Yumiko Nogawa as Tsuyuko Takeda
- Ruriko Ito as Senko Takeda
- Chikako Miyagi as Kiku Takeda
- Michio Hino as Yukichi Takeda
- Kayo Matsuo as Yukie
- Kōji Wada : Akira Sakata
