= Matouqin Nocturne =

2007 film by Takeo Kimura

- Theatrical poster
- Directed by: Takeo Kimura
- Starring: Yamaguchi Sayoko; Seijun Suzuki
- Production companies: Project Lamu; Airplane Label
- Distributed by: Airplane Label
- Release date: July 21, 2007
- Running time: 55 minutes
- Country: Japan
- Language: Japanese

Matouqin Nocturne (馬頭琴夜想曲, Batōkin yasōkyoku) is a 2007 Japanese film directed by Takeo Kimura and starring Yamaguchi Sayoko and Seijun Suzuki. It is an abstract film focused around the atomic bombing of Nagasaki.

== Cast ==
- Mitsuru Chiak ...Yohane
- Seijun Suzuki
- Sayoko Yamaguchi
