= Story of a Prostitute =

1965 film by Seijun Suzuki

- Directed by: Seijun Suzuki
- Written by: Hajime Takaiwa; Taijiro Tamura (novel)
- Produced by: Kaneo Iwai
- Starring: Tamio Kawachi; Yumiko Nogawa
- Cinematography: Kazue Nagatsuka
- Edited by: Akira Suzuki
- Music by: Naozumi Yamamoto
- Distributed by: Nikkatsu
- Release date: February 28, 1965
- Running time: 96 minutes
- Country: Japan
- Language: Japanese

Story of a Prostitute (春婦伝, Shunpuden) is a 1965 Japanese romantic war drama film directed by Seijun Suzuki. It is based on a story by Taijiro Tamura who, like Suzuki, had served as a soldier in the war.

== Plot ==
Disappointed by the marriage of her lover to a woman he does not love, prostitute Harumi drifts from the city to a remote Japanese outpost in Manchuria to work in a "comfort house," or brothel, during the Sino-Japanese War. The commanding adjutant there takes an immediate liking to the new girl, but she is fascinated by and comes to love Mikami, the officer's aide. At first he is naughty and indifferent to the girl, which enrages her, but they are eventually drawn together. Abused and manipulated by the adjutant, she grows to hate the officer and seeks solace in Mikami's arms. They carry on a clandestine affair, which is a dangerous breach of code for both of them.

Tragedy strikes when Chinese guerrillas attack the outpost and Mikami is severely wounded in a trench. Harumi runs to him and they are both captured by the enemy while he is unconscious. The Chinese dress his wounds and he is given the opportunity to withdraw with them as a prisoner of war. Mikami refuses their offer, stating he is duty-bound not to be captured at all, and only Harumi's intervention prevents him from killing himself. Once again in the custody of the Japanese, Harumi is sent back to the brothel, and Mikami is to be court-martialed and executed in disgrace. Harumi begs the adjutant for mercy, but he has none. During another attack on the outpost, Mikami escapes with Harumi's aid, but instead of fleeing with her, he decides to blow himself up to restore his and his battalion's honor. She leaps on him and they die together.

== Cast ==
- Yumiko Nogawa as Harumi
- Tamio Kawachi as Pvt. Shinkichi Mikami
- Isao Tamagawa as Lt. Narita
- Jūkei Fujioka as Kimura
- Shoichi Ozawa as Sgt. Akiyama

== Production ==
In 1950, Tamura's story was made into a more romantic film, Escape at Dawn, co-written by Akira Kurosawa and directed by Senkichi Taniguchi. For the Nikkatsu adaptation, Suzuki drew upon his firsthand experience at the wartime front to portray the conditions and behavior in a more realistic light. What was presented in the film and the actual conditions "probably aren't that different," Suzuki said in a 2005 interview. Most Japanese war movies portrayed the era with healthy doses of tragedy, but Suzuki infused an air of ludicrousness in his film. His own opinion of the wartime military experience was that beside the brutality, it was "extremely comical and absurd."

Suzuki could not film on location in China, so studio sets and lookalike locations in Japan were used.

== Reception ==
At this time, Suzuki was at regular odds with Nikkatsu, his studio. He would be given a project and expected to direct it in workmanlike fashion, but he consistently introduced stylistic nuances and levels of realism that the studio resented.

Suzuki didn't at first get critical attention as a "B-movie director." By 1965, some critics began to take note of his style, but this film had very mixed reviews, mostly disappointing. In this case, the first version of Tamura's story was chaste (the girls were "entertainers," not "comfort women") and romantically inclined, and Suzuki portrayed a far more realistic portrait of the ugly side of Japanese military life. Critic Tadao Sato noted that most films portray the very meditative and serene traditions that Japanese are known for, but Suzuki also dramatizes "another tradition that is the complete opposite ... very disorderly and grotesque." This and the realistic onscreen depiction of sexuality and sadism didn't win over audiences.

It's because in drama ... you need some kind of moral code or something binding that the characters either submit to or resist. You need to have that element in creating drama. When you watch a western, you see that its foundation is the spirit of sacrifice. The drama in a western develops from that foundation. In Japanese films we don't share that element. A code is the foundation for us. As an army has its own code, prostitutes have their own code. Characters bound by such a code either resist it or submit to it.

— Seijun Suzuki

== Release ==
=== Home media ===
Story of a Prostitute has been released on DVD as part of The Criterion Collection.
