= The Bastard (1963 film) =

- Film poster
- Directed by: Seijun Suzuki
- Screenplay by: Ryozo Kasahara
- Based on: The Incorrigible by Toko Kon
- Produced by: Masayuki Takagi
- Starring: Ken Yamanouchi; Masako Izumi; Midori Tashiro; Chiharu Kuri
- Cinematography: Shigeyoshi Mine
- Edited by: Akira Suzuki
- Music by: Hajime Okumura
- Distributed by: Nikkatsu
- Release date: September 21, 1963 (Japan)
- Running time: 95 minutes
- Country: Japan
- Language: Japanese

The Bastard (Japanese: 悪太郎, Hepburn: Akutarō), a.k.a. The Young Rebel, The Incorrigible, 'The Unimaginable One, Bad Boy or Bad Taro, is a 1963 Japanese youth film directed by Seijun Suzuki for the Nikkatsu Corporation. It is based on the loosely autobiographical novel of the same name by Toko Kon. Ken Yamauchi stars as Togo Konno, the titular bastard. The film marked Suzuki's first collaboration with production designer Takeo Kimura.

== Cast ==
- Ken Yamauchi
- Masako Izumi
- Midori Tashiro
- Chiharu Kuri

== Release ==
The Bastard was theatrically released in Japan on September 21, 1963.
