= The Face of Jizo =

Chichi to Kuraseba (The Face of Jizo)
- Original language: Japanese
- Written by: Hisashi Inoue

Premiere
- Date: September 3, 1994

Chichi to Kuraseba The Face of Jizo Die Tage mit Vater Mio Padre
- Chichi to Kuraseba (The Face of Jizo)
- Author: Hisashi Inoue
- Original title: Chichi to Kuraseba
- Translator: Roger Pulvers; Isolde Asai; Franco Gervasio, Ai Aoyama
- Language: Japanese
- Publisher: Shinchosha
- Publication date: January 2001
- Publication place: Japan
- English publication date: August 2004
- Pages: 126, 191
- ISBN: 978-4-10-116828-9; ISBN 978-4-9902115-0-9

The Face of Jizo (父と暮せば, Chichi to Kuraseba) is a Japanese play written by Hisashi Inoue.

== Plays ==
- It was performed at Japan Society New York on August 9, 2024, starring by Rino Aise and Eddy Toru Ohno, directed by Ryuma Matsuzaka.
- It was performed at Japan Society on August 8, 2023, starring by Rino Aise and Jun Suenaga.
- It was performed by Komatsuza as their 34th Play, from September 3 to 18, 1994, directed by Hitoshi Uyama, starring by Masayo Umezawa and Kei Suma. It has been performed frequently not only all over Japan but also overseas. Paris in 1997, Moscow in 2001, Hong Kong in 2004 and London in 2007.
- Now, the play is performed by Komatsuza and some theatrical companies.

== Books ==
The play Chichi to Kuraseba (Living with Father) is published by Shinchosha in 2001.

The play was translated into three languages and published by Komatsuza.

- The Face of Jizo in English by Roger Pulvers in 2004.
- Living with Father in English by Željko Cipriš in The Columbia Anthology of Modern Japanese Drama, 2017.
- Die Tage mit Vater (The Day with Father) in German by Isolde Asai in 2006.
- Mio Padre (My Father) in Italian by Franco Gervasio and Ai Aoyama in 2006,.

== CD ==
The play is recorded for a CD with starring Tomoko Saito and Kei Masu, published by Shinchosha, on April 25, 2003.

== Film ==
The play is adapted for a film Chichi to Kuraseba directed by Kazuo Kuroki, starring by Rie Miyazawa, Yoshio Harada and Tadanobu Asano, in 2004. It was filmed as the 3rd and concluding volume of Kazuo Kuroki's Trilogy works for War Requiem.

== See also ==
- Atomic bombings of Hiroshima and Nagasaki
