= The Face of Jizo (film) =

- The Face of Jizo DVD cover
- Directed by: Kazuo Kuroki
- Written by: Hisashi Inoue
- Based on: The Face of Jizo by Hisashi Inoue
- Starring: Rie Miyazawa; Yoshio Harada; Tadanobu Asano
- Cinematography: Tatsuo Suzuki
- Edited by: Yoshiyuki Okuhara
- Music by: Teizo Matsumura
- Release date: July 31, 2004 (Japan)
- Running time: 99 minutes
- Country: Japan
- Language: Japanese

The Face of Jizo (Japanese: 父と暮せば, Hepburn: Chichi to Kuraseba) is a 2004 Japanese war drama film directed by Kazuo Kuroki and starring Rie Miyazawa, Yoshio Harada and Tadanobu Asano. It is based on the play of the same name by Hisashi Inoue. It was the 3rd and final film of Kazuo Kuroki's War Requiem trilogy, following Tomorrow (1988) and A Boy's Summer in 1945 (2002).

The story follows a young woman, a survivor of the atomic bombing of Hiroshima, and her attempts to forge a relationship with a young man while mourning the death of her father in the atomic bombing.

== Plot ==
Three years after the atomic bombing, young librarian Mitsue lives alone, plagued by guilt and sorrow over the death in the bombing of her father, who was her only living relative. One day, a young man, Masa, visits her library to study and find the morgue of the atomic bombing. Mitsue and the young man find themselves attracted to each other, but Mitsue fears that her grief for her father will not permit her to be happy. When she tries to break things off with Masa, she is visited by the ghost of her father, who encourages her to embrace life and pursue her budding romance with the young man.

== Cast ==
- Rie Miyazawa as "Mitsue Fukuyoshi", a young lady.
- Yoshio Harada as "Takezo Fukuyoshi", a ghost of Mitsue's father.
- Tadanobu Asano as "Masa Kinoshita", a young man.

== Awards ==
- 2004, 28th Yamaji Fumiko Film Award to Kazuo Kuroki and 18th Yamaji Fumiko Actress Award to Rie Miyazawa by Yamaji Fumiko Cultural Foundation
- 2004 Nikkan Sports Film Award - Best Director to Kazuo Kuroki
- 2004 Hochi Film Award - Best Supporting Actor to Yoshio Harada
- 2004 Asahi Best Film Festival - 2nd Prize of Japanese Film
- 2004 Kinema Junpo - Best Actress to Rie Miyazawa
- 2004 Kinema Junpo - 4th Prize of Japanese Film
- 2004 Mainichi Film Award - Best Director to Kazuo Kuroki
- 2004, 47th Blue Ribbon Awards - Best Actress to Rie Miyazawa
- 2004 Japanese Film Pen Club Award - 1st Prize of Japanese Film
- 2005 Yokohama Film Festival - Special Prize to Kazuo Kuroki; 6th best film
