= Koishihama Station =

Railway station in Ōfunato, Iwate Prefecture, Japan

Koishihama Station 恋し浜駅
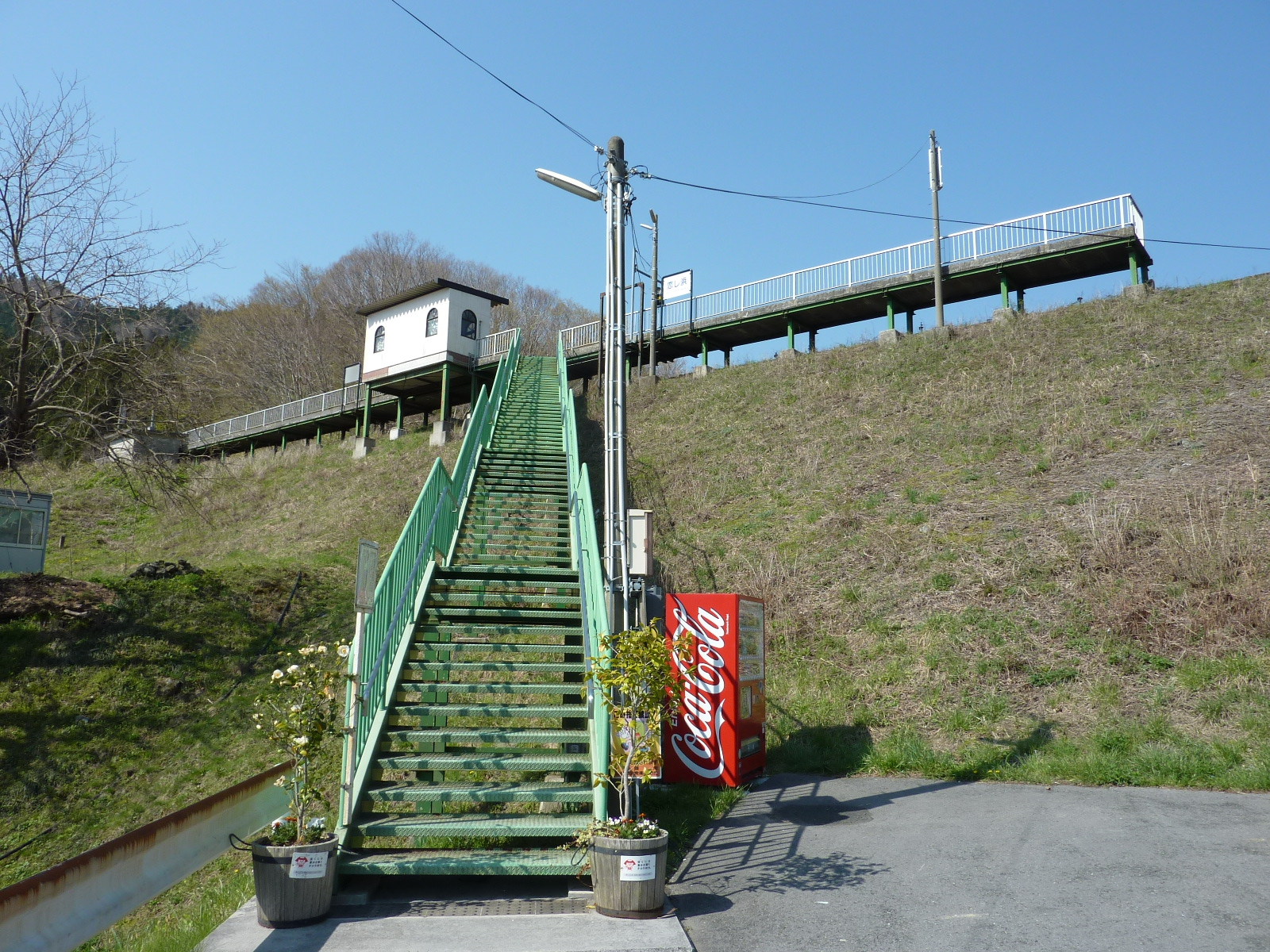
- Koishihama Station in May 2010

General information
- Location: Sanriku-cho Ryōri-aze Koishihama, Ōfunato-shi, Iwate-ken 022-0211; Japan
- Coordinates: 39°04′28.42″N 141°48′58.94″E
- Operator: Sanriku Railway
- Line: ■ Rias Line
- Distance: 12.0 km from Sakari
- Platforms: 1 side platform
- Tracks: 1

Other information
- Status: Unstaffed
- Website: Official website

History
- Opened: 16 October 1985
- Former names: 15
Location
- Location within Japan

Koishihama Station (恋し浜駅, Koishihama-eki) is a railway station on the Sanriku Railway Company’s Rias Line located in the city of Ōfunato, Iwate Prefecture, Japan. It is 12.0 rail kilometers from the terminus of the line at Sakari Station.

== Station layout ==
Koishihama Station has a single elevated side platform serving a single bi-directional track. There is no station building, but only a shelter on the platform. The station is unattended.

== History ==
Koishihama Station opened on 16 October 1985 using the kanji Koishihama Station (小石浜駅). The name was changed to its present form on 20 July 2009. During the 11 March 2011 Tōhoku earthquake and tsunami, part of the tracks on the Minami-Rias Line were swept away, thus suspending services. The line resumed operations on 3 April 2013 between Sakari and Yoshihama. Services between Yoshihama and Kamaishi resumed on 5 April 2014. Minami-Rias Line, a portion of Yamada Line, and Kita-Rias Line constitute Rias Line on 23 March 2019. Accordingly, this station became an intermediate station of Rias Line.

== Adjacent stations ==
←	Service	→
Sanriku Railway Company
Ryōri	Local	Horei

== Surrounding area ==
- Koishihama Fishing Port

== See also ==
- List of railway stations in Japan
