= Hashino iron mining and smelting site =

Hashino Iron Mining and Smelting Site
UNESCO World Heritage Site
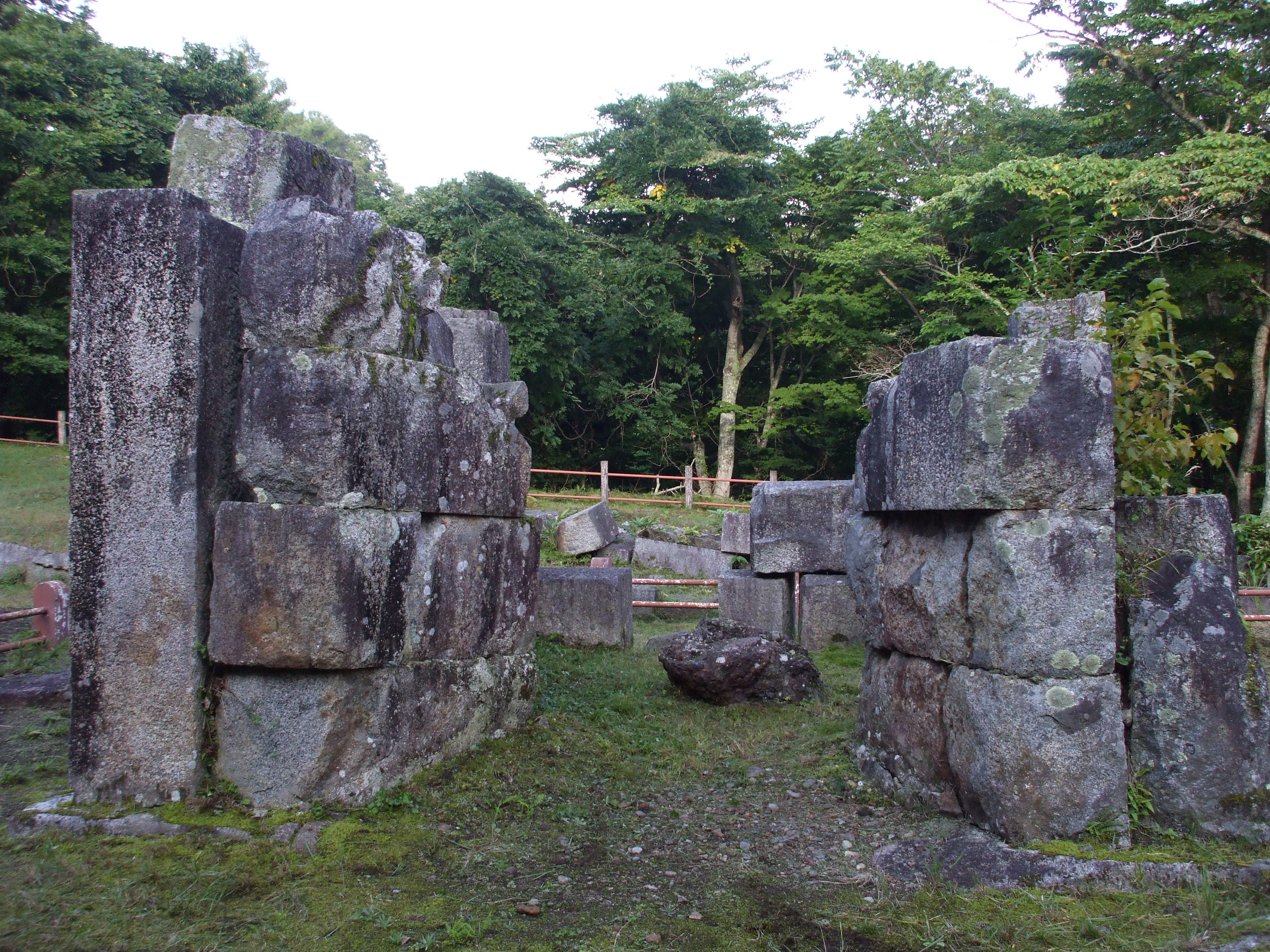
- Ruins of Hashino iron mining and smelting site

- Location within Iwate Prefecture Location within Japan
- Location: Kamaishi, Iwate Prefecture, Tōhoku region, Honshu, Japan
- Part of: Sites of Japan’s Meiji Industrial Revolution: Iron and Steel, Shipbuilding and Coal Mining
- Criteria: Cultural: (ii), (iv)
- Reference: 1484-010
- Inscription: 2015 (39th Session)
- Area: 39.55 ha (97.7 acres)
- Buffer zone: 523.73 ha (1,294.2 acres)
- Coordinates: 39°19′58″N 141°40′47″E
- National Historic Site of Japan

Hashino iron mining and smelting site (橋野高炉跡, Hashino kōro ato) is the ruins of an iron smelting and primitive blast furnace built by the Tokugawa shogunate during the final years of the Edo period in the Hashino neighborhood of the city of Kamaishi, Iwate in the Tohoku region of northern Japan. It has been recognized as the oldest western-style blast furnace in Japan, and is part of the UNESCO World Heritage List as one of the Sites of Japan’s Meiji Industrial Revolution: Iron and Steel, Shipbuilding and Coal Mining.

== History ==
During the Bakumatsu period, Ōshima Takatō, a samurai/engineer from Nanbu Domain, was hired by Mito Domain to construct modern western-style mortars. However, the project failed due to the inferior quality of iron produced by the reverberatory furnace he produced in Mito Domain in 1855. He returned to Morioka, and assisted by an engineer on loan from Satsuma Domain, built a new western-style blast furnace near local deposits of magnetite in 1857. The furnace was based on a design found in the Dutch engineering text Het Gietwezen in s' Rijks Ijzer-Geschutgieterij te Luik by Huguenin. Although the project was technically successful, the Tokugawa shogunate did not pursue further development due to the Mito rebellion and the suppression of western-style innovation during the Ansei Purge by the tairō Ii Naosuke.

The new Hashino blast furnace was turned by the shogunate to Morioka Domain in April 1859. Morioka Domain quickly expanded operations, constructing two more blast furnaces to produce 1125 tons of pig iron per year, using over 1000 workers, making it the largest smelter in Japan at the time. Although most of this iron was intended for weapons production, the domain also produced coinage on behalf of the government. When an order came from the government in 1868 to cease production, Morioka Domain continued to mint coins illegally on a large scale through 1869. This came to an end in 1871 after the Meiji restoration and the abolition of Morioka Domain, and the No.1 and No.2 blast furnaces were closed at that time. In 1894, the remaining blast furnace was absorbed into the Kamaishi Tanaka Metals Company and was later closed as well. The site fell into ruins, and was excavated in 1955. It received protection as a National Historic Site in 1957. The American Society of Metals recognized the site as a historical landmark in 1984, noting its contribution to the development of the Yawata Iron and Steel Works.

In 2015, it was included in the UNESCO World Heritage List.

== See also ==
- List of Historic Sites of Japan (Iwate)
