= 26th Yokohama Film Festival =

2005 film festival in Yokohama, Japan

- Location: Kannai Hall, Yokohama, Kanagawa, Japan
- Founded: 1980
- Festival date: 6 February 2005

The 26th Yokohama Film Festival (第26回ヨコハマ映画祭) was held on 6 February 2005 in Kannai Hall, Yokohama, Kanagawa, Japan.

== Awards ==
- Best Film: Kamikaze Girls
- Best Actor: Kōji Yakusho – Yudan Taiteki, Tokyo: Level One, Warai no Daigaku: University of Laughs
- Best Actress: Kyōko Fukada – Kamikaze Girls
- Best Supporting Actor: Akira Emoto – Yudan Taiteki, Niwatori wa Hadashida
- Best Supporting Actress: Kirin Kiki – Kamikaze Girls, Half a Confession, Fireflies: River of Light
- Best Director: Tetsuya Nakashima – Kamikaze Girls
- Best New Director: Izuru Narushima – Yudan Taiteki
- Best Screenplay: Shinobu Yaguchi – Swing Girls
- Best Cinematography: Takahide Shibanushi – Swing Girls, Shinkokyū no Hitsuyō, Gege
- Best New Talent:
  - Yūya Yagira – Nobody Knows
  - Anna Tsuchiya – Kamikaze Girls, The Taste of Tea
  - Juri Ueno – Swing Girls, Josee, the Tiger and the Fish, Chirusoku no Natsu
- Special Prize: Kazuo Kuroki – A Boy's Summer in 1945, The Face of Jizo

== Best 10 ==
1. Kamikaze Girls
2. Blood and Bones
3. Nobody Knows
4. Swing Girls
5. Josee, the Tiger and the Fish
6. The Face of Jizo
7. Yudan Taiteki
8. The Golden Cups: One More Time
9. Shinkokyū no Hitsuyō
10. Hana and Alice

runner-up: Niwatori wa Hadashida
