= Yoshio Harada =

Japanese actor (1940–2011)

- Born: 29 February 1940; Tokyo, Japan
- Died: 19 July 2011 (aged 71); Tokyo, Japan
- Occupation: Actor
- Years active: 1967–2011
- Height: 175 cm (5 ft 9 in)

Japanese name
- Kanji: 原田 芳雄
- Hiragana: はらだ よしお
Transcriptions
- Romanization: Harada Yoshio

Yoshio Harada (原田 芳雄, Harada Yoshio; 29 February 1940 – 19 July 2011) was a Japanese actor and singer, known for his portrayals of rugged and complex antiheroes. He received a variety of accolades, including a Japan Academy Film Prize, two Blue Ribbon Awards, two Hochi Film Awards, and five Kinema Junpo Awards.

Harada also was a blues musician, releasing a number of records throughout his career.

== Life and career ==
Born in Tokyo, Harada joined the Haiyuza Theatre Company in 1966 and made his television debut in 1967 with "Tenka no seinen" and his film debut in 1968 with Fukushū no uta ga kikoeru. He came to fame appearing in New Action films at Nikkatsu playing youthful rebels. Among his features for Nikkatsu was the 1971 exploitation film, Stray Cat Rock: Crazy Riders '71 (aka Alleycat Rock: Crazy Riders '71) for director Toshiya Fujita where he played the son of a yakuza boss.

Leaving the Haiyūza in 1971, he appeared in films made by many directors, including Seijun Suzuki, Shūji Terayama, Azuma Morisaki, Kihachi Okamoto, Rokurō Mochizuki, Jun Ichikawa, Hirokazu Koreeda and Kōji Wakamatsu, but he was particularly favored by Kazuo Kuroki and Junji Sakamoto. He starred in many independent films, including those of the Art Theatre Guild. According to the critic Mark Schilling, Harada was "a favorite of generations of Japanese helmers for his rugged features, low, rumbling voice and distinctive presence, with shades of darkness and wildness that made him a natural for antihero roles in his youth." Harada also appeared in many television dramas.

== Honours ==
- Medal with Purple Ribbon (2003)
- Order of the Rising Sun, 4th Class, Gold Rays with Rosette (2011)

== Death ==
He died on 19 July 2011 from colorectal cancer. His last starring film was Someday, and it was at a press conference for that film on 11 July that he made his last public appearance.

== Selected filmography ==
=== Film ===
- Fukushū no Uta ga Kikoeru (1968)
- Hangyaku no Melody (1970) – Tetsu Tsukada
- Shinjuku Outlaw: Step On the Gas (1970)
- Nora-neko rokku: Bôsô shûdan '71 (1971) – Pirania
- Kantō Exile (1971)
- Hachigatsu no nureta suna (1971) – Priest
- Kanto Kanbu-kai (1971)
- Mushukunin Mikogami no Jôkichi (1972–1973, part 1-3) – Jokichi of Mikogami
- Akai tori nigeta? (1973) – Hiroshi Bando
- Lady Snowblood 2: Love Song of Vengeance (1974) – Shusuke Tokunaga
- Ryoma Ansatsu (1974) – Ryoma Sakamoto
- Pastoral: To Die in the Country (1974) – Arashi
- Preparation for the Festival (1975) – Toshihiro Nakajima
- Yasagure Keiji (1976)
- Manhunt (1976) – Detective Yamura
- Yasagure deka (1976)
- Han gyakû no tabi (1976)
- A Tale of Sorrow and Sadness (1977) – Mr. Miyake
- Ballad of Orin (1977) – Big Man
- Shogun's Samurai (1978) – Sanza Nagoya (Flute Player)
- Genshiryoku sensô (1978) – Sakata
- Inubue (1978) – Kanji Mitsueda
- Orenji Rôdo kyûkô (1978)
- Mahiru nari (1978) – Man
- Yorû gaku zuretâ (1978)
- Hunter in the Dark (1979) – Yataro Tanigawa
- Ana no kiba (1979)
- Zigeunerweisen (1980) – Nakasago
- Yūgure made (1980) – Restaurant owner
- Disciples of Hippocrates (1980) – Tokumatsu
- Misuta, Misesu, Misu Ronri (1980) – Eisuke Misaki
- Slow na boogie ni shitekure (1981) – Teruo Miyazato
- Kagero-za (1981) – Wada
- Mizu no nai puuru (1982) – Owner
- Tattoo Ari (1982)
- Manji (1983) – Takeshi Kakeuchi
- Namidabashi (1983) – Shuzo
- Sukanpin walk (1984) – Tsutomu yahagi
- Umitsubame Jyo no kiseki (1984) – Yonamine
- Farewell to the Ark (1984) – Daisaki Tokito
- Ikiteru uchiga hana nanoyo shin-dara sore madeyo to sengen (1985) – Isamu Miyazato
- Tomo yo shizukani nemure (1985) – Jiro Takahata
- Tosha 1/250 Byo Out of Focus (1985)
- Kyabarê (1986) – Shirae
- Comic Magazine (1986) – Producer
- Birî za kiddo no atarashii yoake (1986) – Harry Callahan
- Aitsu ni Koishite
- Chōchin (1987)
- Kono aino monogatari (1987)
- Saraba itoshiki hito yo (1987) – Owner of Disco
- Tomorrow – ashita (1988) – Yamaguchi
- Hotaru (1989) – Hashimoto
- Yumemi-dôri no hitobito (1989)
- Nijisseiki shônen dokuhon (1989) – Yoshimoto
- Shucchou (1989)
- Dotsuitarunen (1989) – Makio Sajima
- Kiss yori kantan (1989)
- Ronin-gai (1990) – Gen'nai Aramaki
- Ready to Shoot (1990) – Katsuhiko Goda
- Tekken (1990)
- Shishiohtachi no natsu (1991)
- Rasuto Furankenshutain (1991)
- Yumeji (1991) – Wakiya
- Muno no Hito (1991) – Homeless
- Kiss yori kantan 2: hyoryuhen (1991)
- The Triple Cross (1992) – Noji
- Netorare Sosuke (1992) – Sosuke Kitamura
- Singapore Sling (1993)
- Rampo (1994) – Big Star
- The Hunted (1995) – Takeda Sensei
- The Girl of Silence (1995) – Shizuo Tanaka
- Umihoozuki (1995)
- Nemureru bijo (1995) – Yoshio Eguchi
- Kagerô II (1996) – Susumu Sawada
- Onibi (1997) – Noriyuki Kunihiro
- Koi gokudo (1997)
- The Story of PuPu (1998)
- Big show! Hawaii ni utaeba (1999) – Tashiro
- Anaza hevun (2000) – Detective Tobitaka
- Zawa-zawa Shimo-Kitazawa (2000) – Kyushiro
- Suri (2000)
- Party 7 (2000) – Captain Banana
- KT (2002) – Akikazu Kamikawa
- Onna kunishuu ikki (2002)
- Kyoki no sakura (2002) – Aota Shuzo
- Utsukushii natsu kirishima (2002) – Shigenori Hidaka
- Azumi (2003) – Gessai Obata
- 9 Souls (2003) – Torakichi Hasegawa
- Shôwa kayô daizenshû (2003) – Hirota – the Shop Owner in Gunma
- Kantoku kansen (2003)
- Tengoku no honya – koibi (2004) – Yamaki
- The Face of Jizo (2004) – Takezou
- Izo (2004)
- Heaven's Bookstore (2004) – Mamoru Ohama
- Drawing Restraint 9 (2005) – Flensing Deck Crew
- Azumi 2 (2005)
- Aegis (2005) – Koichiro Kajimoto
- Uôtâzu (2006) – Owner
- Hana (2006) – Junai Onodera
- Nightmare Detective (2006) – Keizo Oishi
- Nippon no jitensha dorobô (2006)
- Dororo (2007) – Jukai
- Jitsuroku Rengo Sekigun: Asama sanso e no michi (2007) – (voice)
- Orion-za kara no shôtaijô (2007) – Tomekichi Senba – old
- Little DJ: Chiisana koi no monogatari (2007) – Yuji Takasaki
- Tamio no shiawase (2008) – Nobuo Kanzaki
- Still Walking (2008) – Kyohei Yokoyama
- Hotaru no haka (2008) – Maichi Kaicho of Nishimiya
- Ultra Miracle Love Story (2009) – Dr. Misawa
- Ôgonka: Hisureba hana, shisureba chô (2009)
- Zatoichi: The Last (2010) – Genkichi
- Rosuto kuraimu: Senkô (2010)
- I Wish (2011) – Wataru (Grandfather's Friend)
- Someday (2011) – Yoshi Kazamatsuri (final film role)

=== Television ===
- Haru no Sakamichi (1971) – Yagyū Jūbei Mitsuyoshi
- Tsūkai! Kōchiyama Sōshun (1975–1976)
- Natsu ni Koisuru Onnatachi (1983) – Daisuke Mizushima
- Seibu Keisatsu PART-III Final Special Daimon Dies! Men Forever (1984) --Reiji Fujisaki
- Dokuganryū Masamune (1987) – Mogami Yoshiaki
- Suna no Utsuwa (2004) - Chiyokichi Motoura
- The Waste Land (2009) – Ichizō Daimon
- Hi no Sakana (2009) – Shozō Murata
- Kokosei Restaurant (2011) – Sadatoshi Muraki

== Awards and nominations ==
A veteran of over 80 films, Harada won the best actor award at the 1990 Blue Ribbon Awards for Ronin-gai and Ware ni Utsu Yōi Ari. He had earlier won the Blue Ribbon best supporting actor prize in 1975 for Matsuri no junbi. He also won the best actor prize at the Mainichi Film Awards in 1997 for Onibi, and the Hochi Film Award for best supporting actor in 1989 for Dotsuitarunen. He was twice nominated for the Best Actor Japanese Academy Award and won the award for best supporting actor at the 11th Yokohama Film Festival for Dotsuitarunen and Kiss yori kantan.

He received a Medal of Honor with Purple Ribbon from the Japanese government in 2003.
