= Novala Takemoto =

Japanese author and fashion designer

- 嶽本 野ばら
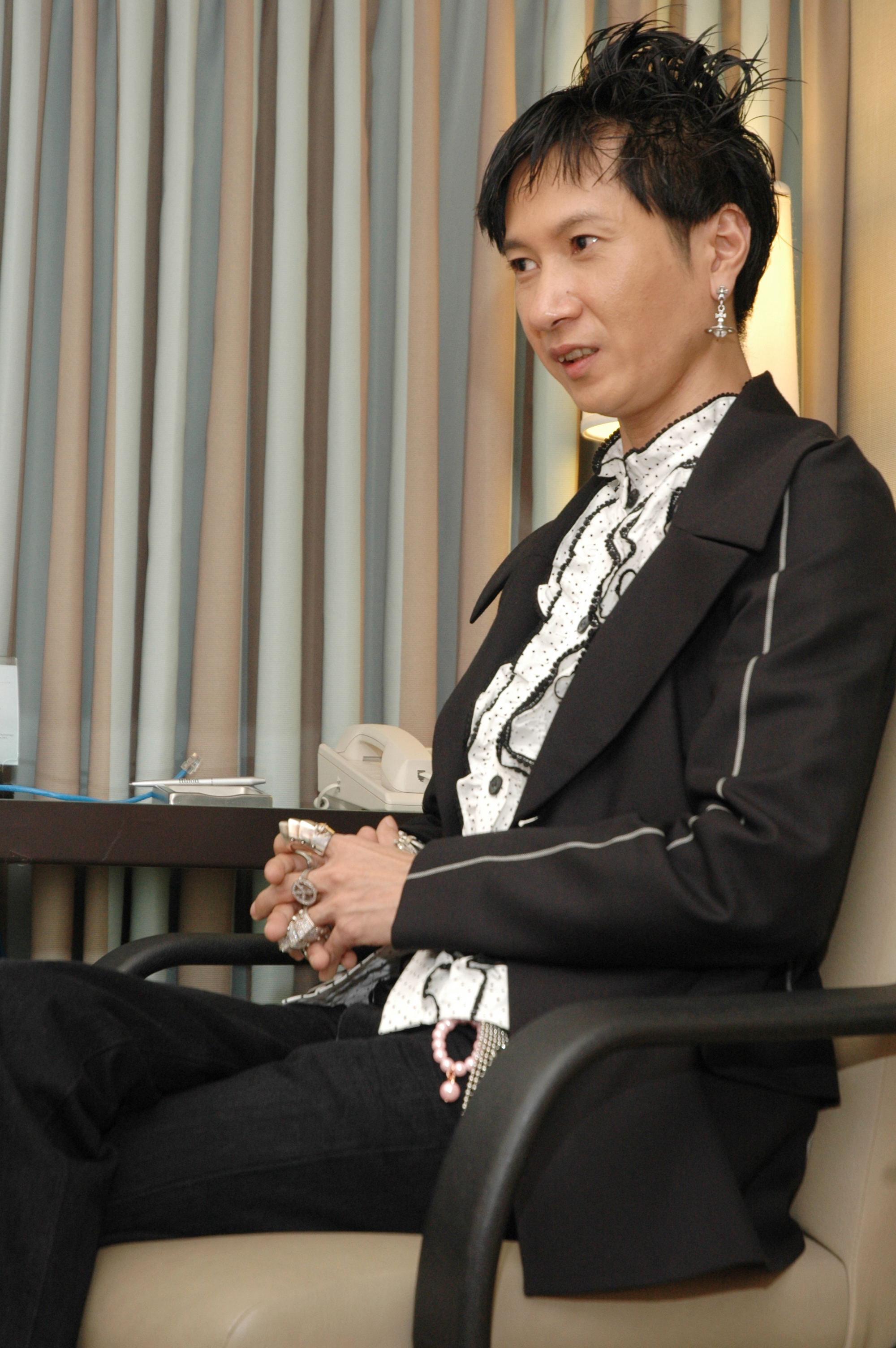
- Born: Toshiaki Takemoto; Uji, Kyoto Prefecture, Japan
- Occupations: writer, fashion designer
- Writing career
- Genres: essays, novels, short stories

Toshiaki Takemoto (嶽本 稔明, Takemoto Toshiaki), known professionally as Novala Takemoto (嶽本 野ばら, Takemoto Nobara), is a Japanese author, and fashion designer.

== Biography ==
Takemoto was born in Uji, south of Kyoto. As a child, he was shy and preferred drawing and reading (two of his favorite authors were Osamu Dazai and Yasunari Kawabata) to spending time with others, and was a big fan of the anime series Candy Candy, in the discovery of which he was "happy to finally find what [he] liked". He was also sometimes beaten by his father, which he says persuaded him to follow his own path in life. After dropping out of Osaka University of Arts in 1987, he participated in a variety of artistic, musical and theatrical activities. From 1992 to 1997, he made his literary debut contributing serial essays to Hanagata Bunka Tsūshin (花形文化通信), a Kansai free arts newspaper. These essays were collected and published in book format in 1998 as Soleilnuit: For Becoming a Proper Young Lady, and received wide recognition. These essays also increased the popularity of the Japanese term otome, referring to a young lady or young maiden. Shogakukan published his debut novel Missin' in 2000. He was nominated for the Yukio Mishima Literary Award twice, for his novels Emily (in 2003) and Lolita (in 2004).

Takemoto is best known for Shimotsuma Monogatari, titled Kamikaze Girls in English. The series was adapted to a manga and a film which was directed by Tetsuya Nakashima. Another of his novels, Twins: A Variety Store Named "The End of the World", was also adapted for film in 2001 by Kiseki Hamada.

Takemoto was arrested in September 2007 for violating the Cannabis Control Law and was later convicted of the crime. He was arrested again in 2015 after he was found to have two grams of contraband that are banned under the Narcotics Control Law in his possession.

== Works in English translation ==
- Kamikaze Girls (original title: Shimotsuma Monogatari), trans. Akemi Wegmüller (Viz Media, 2006)
- Missin' and Missin' 2: Kasako (original title: Mishin and Mishin 2: Kasako), trans. Anne Ishii (Viz Media, 2009)
  - Missin'
  - Little store called End of the World
  - Missin' 2: Kasako
- Emily (original title: Emirī), trans. Misa Dikengil Lindberg (Shueisha English Edition, 2013)
  - Emily
  - Corset
  - Readymade

== Works ==
=== Novels and short stories ===
- 2000 Missin' (ミシン)
- 2001 Twins: A Variety Store Named "The End of the World" (Twins: Zoku-Sekai no Owari to Iu Na no Zakkaten / ツインズ——続・世界の終わりという名の雑貨店)
- 2001 Café: A Collection of Literary Sketches (Café Shōhinshū / カフェー小品集)
- 2002 Emily (エミリー)
- 2002 Shimotsuma Story (Shimotsuma Monogatari / 下妻物語)
  (English title for the movie adaptation: Kamikaze Girls)
- 2003 Princess Scale (Uroko-hime / 鱗姫)
- 2003 Calps Alpis (カルプス・アルピス)
- 2003 A Child Abandoned by Deus (Deusu no Sutego / デウスの棄て児)
- 2004 Lolita. (ロリヰタ。)
- 2004 Missin' 2: Kasako (ミシン2/カサコ)
- 2005 SHIMOTSUMA STORY FINAL (Shimotsuma Monogatari Kan---Yankī-chan to Rorīta-chan to Satsujin Jiken / 下妻物語・完 ヤンキーちゃんとロリータちゃんと殺人事件)
- 2005 Sicilienne (シシリエンヌ)
- 2006 Happiness (ハピネス)
- 2007 ALL WORKS Fetish
- 2007 Metamorphosis (Henshin / 変身)
- 2007 Hallucinative Anthology (Gensō Shōhinshū / 幻想小品集)
- 2007 Arabian Nights (Sen'yaichiya Kishi--Arajin to Mahō no Okaimono / 千夜一夜騎士——アラジンと魔法のお買物)
- 2008 Cannabis (Taima / タイマ)
- 2008 Olochi, super remix ver. (Orochi, super remix ver. / おろち)
- 2008 ROCK'N'ROLL SWINDLE——How to Form a Proper Punk Band (ROCK'N'ROLL SWINDLE——Tadashii panku bando no tsukurikata / 正しいパンク・バンドの作り方)
- 2009 Unhallowed Kingdom (Shukufuku sarenai ōkoku / 祝福されない王国)
- 2009 Long-Distance Love at 14 Years Old (Jūyonsai no enkyori ren'ai / 十四歳の遠距離恋愛)

=== Essay collections ===
- 1998 Soleilnuit: For Becoming a Proper Young Lady (Soreinu---Tadashii Otome ni Naru Tame ni / それいぬ——正しい乙女になるために)
- 2002 Patchwork (パッチワーク)
- 2004 Alice's Adventures in Fantasy Land (Ren'ai no Kuni no Arisu / 恋愛の国のアリス)
- 2024 Lolita Fashion (ロリータ・ファッション)

=== Picture books ===
- 2004 Uloco-hime: Princess Scale (うろこひめ)

=== Photo books ===
- 2007 short hope (photography by Maki Miyashita)

=== Other ===
- I Love You
- 2009 Maidens' Trivia (Otome no toribia / 乙女のトリビア)
