= Roger Pulvers =

American born Australian playwright, theatre director and translator

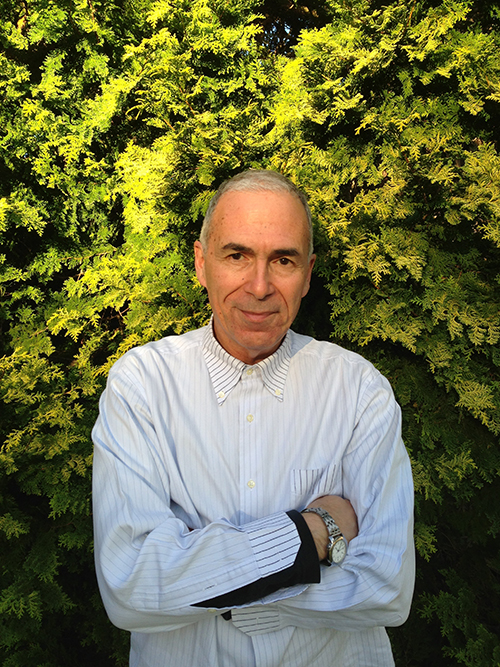
- Born: 4 May 1944 (age 82)
- Education: UCLA; Harvard University
- Occupations: Novelist, playwright, theatre director, translator

Roger Pulvers (born 4 May 1944) is an Australian playwright, theatre director and translator. He has published more than 45 books in English and Japanese, from novels to essays, plays, poetry and translations. He has written prolifically for the stage and has seen his plays produced at major theatres in Japan, Australia and the United States

Pulvers has also directed widely in Australia and Japan, both in English and Japanese. He has written original scripts for radio documentaries and dramas that have been produced by ABC (Australia), as well as television scripts for NHK (Japan) and screenplays for feature films.

== Early years ==
Pulvers was born into a Jewish-American family in Brooklyn, New York on 4 May 1944. Soon after birth, his family moved to Los Angeles, where he grew up, attending Burnside Ave. Elementary School, Louis Pasteur Junior High School (now LACES and Alexander Hamilton High School (1961), at which he was Student Body President.

Pulvers took part in the Democratic National Convention, held in Los Angeles in 1960, where John F. Kennedy was nominated for the presidency. His position was Head of Youth for Stuart Symington, senator from Missouri and also a candidate for the nomination.

Early exposure to show business came from annual trips in the 1950s to Las Vegas, where Pulvers saw dinner shows of The Ritz Brothers, Sammy Davis Jr. and other entertainers. Also, his father, Louis (1903–1993), had worked as a lighting technician at Warner Bros. during and after the war, bringing home piles of glossy enlargements of actors on set. His mother, Miriam (1912–2006), had been secretary to William S. Klein, lawyer for the Shubert brothers, owners of New York theatres. In her later years she became private secretary to Bette Davis.

== Education ==
Pulvers was an undergraduate at UCLA, completing the four-year course in three years with a major in Political Science, summa cum laude.

After graduation in June 1964, he went to Bloomington, Indiana to attend a Russian-language intensive course, going from there to Finland, the Soviet Union and Italy. In the Soviet Union he travelled extensively, visiting Moscow, Kyiv, Kharkiv, Yalta, Riga, Leningrad and Novgorod.

In September 1964 he entered the Russian Area Studies Program at Harvard University Graduate School, living on campus at Perkins Hall. He completed the two-year Master's Course in one year, receiving his MA with a thesis on "The Planning of Soviet Science."

Pulvers spent the summer of 1965 in the Soviet Union, Finland, Denmark and Switzerland, returning to UCLA to further his studies of Eastern Europe and to study Polish. In September 1966, he went to Poland to do post-graduate work at Warsaw University on a scholarship from the National Students' Association (NSA) of the United States. While there, his interests turned away from political science to film and theatre, thanks to almost daily visits to the theatres and cinemas of that city. In January 1967 he moved to Kraków but was soon to leave Poland due to a scandal involving the NSA and the CIA. Though he was entirely innocent of any connection with the latter organization, he felt that he would never be able to return to Poland or the Soviet Union. He spent three months in Paris attending classes at the Sorbonne until his return to Los Angeles in May 1967. In September of that year he left the United States for Japan.

== Career ==
In the late autumn of 1967, after spending four weeks in Korea to change his visa, Pulvers took up a lectureship in Russian and Polish at Kyoto Sangyo University. He spent five years in Kyoto teaching at that university and at Doshisha University, where he conducted a course in American poetry.

In 1969 he published his first book, a collection of short stories under the title "On the Edge of Kyoto." This was followed in August 1970 by the publication of a short play in Japanese translation, "The Perfect Crime of Mrs. Garigari", in the leading drama magazine, "Shingeki". In 1972 he was one of the winners of an essay contest sponsored by the Mainichi Shimbun. This led to the publication of the essay, "Kenji Isn't Here Now." This was Pulvers' first published work about Japanese author and poet Miyazawa Kenji; and it prompted a long association with the Mainichi Daily News.

In August 1972 Pulvers travelled to Australia for the first time to take up a lectureship in Japanese at the Australian National University in Canberra. It was not long before he was writing articles and stories for The Canberra Times, The Australian, The National Times, Newsweek and other publications, as well as doing regular radio broadcasts for a programs on the ABC. He also produced and directed plays in Canberra. His own plays were produced in Melbourne, Adelaide, Newcastle and Canberra. On 6 July 1976 he became an Australian citizen.

During the 1970s, Pulvers frequently went back to Japan to continue his involvement in Japanese arts and to be with his many friends who were their practitioners. He became particularly intimate with novelist/playwright Inoue Hisashi, at whose home he stayed. Pulvers also travelled to Europe, especially to Poland, where he was greeted in 1970 by film director Andrzej Wajda. His close friendship with Wajda has continued over the years.

In January 1980 Pulvers left the ANU to become Writer-in-Residence at the Playbox Theatre in Melbourne. It was at the Playbox that he directed his own work and that of other playwrights. In the summer of 1982, Pulvers went to Rarotonga in the Cook Islands to be assistant to director Nagisa Oshima on the film "Merry Christmas, Mr. Lawrence." After that he returned to Japan to take up the position of literary editor at the Mainichi Daily News in Tokyo.

Since the 1980s, Pulvers has published hundreds of articles in the Japanese and world press (the Far Eastern Economic Review, The New Scientist, etc.), as well as books of fiction, non-fiction and translations from Japanese. He has appeared frequently on Japanese television and radio, and acted in the NHK Taiga Drama, "Sanga Moyu."

Since the early 1990s, Pulvers has divided his time primarily between Tokyo and Sydney, with frequent trips to Europe, particularly Poland, Ireland and the U.K. From 1996 to 1999 he was a professor at Kyoto University of Art and Design; and from 1999, professor at Tokyo Institute of Technology, where he was Head of the Centre for World Civilizations. He retired in 2013 to devote himself entirely to his writing.

In Tokyo he continued to write articles, including his weekly column, Counterpoint, in The Japan Times, to publish books of fiction and non-fiction, to direct in the theatre, to write screenplays and to act in film. In Australia he most recently directed at the Roxy Theatre in Leeton his translation/adaptation of Nikolai Gogol's "The Government Inspector."

He wrote the script and directed the feature film of "STAR SAND" on location in Okinawa in 2016. The film was released in Japan in the summer of 2017.

== Awards ==
Awards and honors include the Crystal Simorgh Prize for Best Script at the 27th Fajr International Film Festival in Tehran for "Best Wishes for Tomorrow (Ashita e no Yuigon)" the Miyazawa Kenji Prize in 2008, the Noma Award for the Translation of Japanese Literature in 2013 and the Inoue Yasushi Prize in 2015. Pulvers was also an official member of Prime Minister Jun'ichiro Koizumi's Task Force on Public Diplomacy and in 2009 received the Award of Commendation from the Cultural Affairs Agency (Bunkacho) for contributing to the propagation of Japanese culture overseas. In 2018 he was awarded the Order of the Rising Sun, Gold Rays with Neck Ribbon for his contribution to foreign language education in Japan and to promoting students' understanding of science and technology. Also in 2019 he was appointed a Member of the Order of Australia (AM) for his significant service to Japanese literature and culture as a writer, translator and educator.

== Works in English ==
Novels

- The Death of Urashima Taro (Angus & Robertson, 1981)
- General Yamashita's Treasure (HarperCollins, 1993)
- The Honey and the Fires (ABC Books, 2004 / Balestier Press, 2019)
- The Dream of Lafcadio Hearn (Kurodahan Press, 2010 / Balestier Press, 2019)
- Star Sand (Amazon/Crossing, 2016)
- Liv (Balestier Press, 2018)
- Tokyo Performance (novella, Red Circle, 2018)
- Half of Each Other (Balestier Press, 2019)
- Peaceful Circumstances (Balestier Press, 2019)
- The Charter (short stories, Balestier Press, 2020)

Non-fiction

- If There Were No Japan: A Cultural Memoir (Japan Publishing Industry Foundation for Culture, 2015)
- The Unmaking of an American (Balestier Press, 2019)
- My Japan (Balestier Press, 2020)

Plays (first or major productions only)

- The Fat Lady (Garema Place, Canberra, 1973)
- Bones (LaMama, Melbourne 1973)
- Ice (LaMama, Melbourne 1974)
- The Covenant of the Rainbow (Childers St. Hall Theatre, Canberra 1974)
- Cedoona (South Australian Theatre Co., 1978)
- Yamashita (Playbox Theatre, Melbourne 1978, published by Currency Press, 1981)
- Bertolt Brecht Leaves Los Angeles (Playbox Theatre, Melbourne 1980)
- Australia Majestic (Playbox Theatre, Melbourne 1981)
- General MacArthur in Australia (Sydney Opera House Drama Theatre, Sydney 1981)
- Witold Gombrowicz in Buenos Aires (LaMama, Melbourne 1981)
- The Two-Headed Calf (trans. of the Witkiewicz play, Pram Factory Theatre, Melbourne 1981)
- News Unlimited (Stables Theatre, Sydney 1983)
- Joe's Encyclopedia (Stables Theatre, Sydney 1994)
- Dance of Death (trans. of the Strindberg play, The Royal Theatre, Adelaide 2000)
- Transit (LaMama Theatre, Melbourne, 2004)
- The Government Inspector (translation/adaptation of the Gogol play, Sydney Opera House and Australian tour 2007)

Published Translations of Plays

- The Red Demon (by Noda Hideki. Performed by the Young Vic Theatre Company, London, February 2003; published by Oberon Modern Plays, 2003)
- The Face of Jizo (by Inoue Hisashi, published by Komatsuza)
- The Water Letters (by Inoue Hisashi, published by The Japan P.E.N. Club)
- Once Upon a Time in Japan (folktales, published by Tuttle, 2015)

Radio and Television in Australia

- The Decline of the Japanese Male (ABC Radio National, Australia 1978)
- General MacArthur in Australia (ABC Radio National, Australia 1979)
- Crossing Over (ABC Television, concept, and script for first episode)
- The Covenant of the Rainbow (ABC Radio National and CBC, Canada 1982)
- The Diary of Lucy Gold (ABC Radio National, 1993)
- Coming Darling (SBS Television, 1994) [direction and script]

Film

- Merry Christmas, Mr. Lawrence (Shochiku Fuji, 1983) [assistant to director, dialogue coach]
- Seeing Red (1990) [script]
- The Diary of Anne Frank (Toei, 1995) [script]
- Best Wishes for Tomorrow (Ashita e no Yuigon) (Asmik Ace Entertainment, 2008) [co-writer of script]
- Do You Know What My Name Is? (Sendai Television/Kyodo, 2014) [co-writer of script]
- STAR SAND (The STAR SAND Team, 2017) [director, script]

Other Main Translated Titles

- My Friend Frois (by Inoue Hisashi, translation of novel, Komatsuza, 2009)
- Strong in the Rain (by Miyazawa Kenji, translation of poetry, Bloodaxe Books, 2007)
- Night on the Milky Way Train (by Miyazawa Kenji, translation of novel, Phasminda Publishing / Balestier Press, 2020)
- Strong in the Rain and The Nighthawk Star (by Miyazawa Kenji, translation of poem and story)

For those and other stories by Miyazawa Kenji see:

- Wholly Esenin (by Sergei Esenin, translation of poem, Balestier Press, 2020)
- Poems 2020 (Balestier Press, 2021)
- The Boy of the Winds (Balestier Press, 2022)

== Books in Japanese ==
- On the Edge of Kyoto 京のほとり (Kyou no hotori) (1969)
- ウラシマ・タロウの死 (Urashima Tarō no shi) (1980)
- 日本語インサイド・アウト 甦る方言・スラング・浪花節 (Nihongo insaido auto yomigaeru hougen surangu naniwabushi) (1982)
- ロジャー・パルバースの昭和・ドラマチック!! (Roger Pulvers no shouwa doramachikku!!) (1985)
- ヤマシタ将軍の宝 (Yamashita shōgun no takara = General Yamashita's Treasure) (1986)
- トラップドアが開閉する音 (Torappu doa ga kaihei suru oto) (1987)
- アメリカ人をやめた私 視線は地平をこえて (Amerika jin wo yameta watashi shisen wa chihei wo koete) (1988)
- 新聞を吸収した少女 (Shinbun wo kyūshū shita shoujyo) (1990)
- 戯曲:ドリームタイム (Gikyoku: Dorīmu taimu = Dream Time) (1992)
- 文通英語術 (Buntsū Eigojutsu) (1995)
- 英語で読む銀河鉄道の夜 (Eigo de yomu ginga tetsudō no yoru) (1996)
- 日本ひとめぼれ ユダヤ系作家の生活と意見 (Nihon hitomebore yudaya kei sakka no seikatsu to iken) (1997)
- 英語で読む宮沢賢治詩集 (Eigo de yomu Miyazawa Kenji shishū) (1997)
- 英語で読む桜の森の満開の下 (Eigo de yomu sakura no mori no mankai no shita) (1998)
- 旅する帽子 小説ラフカディオ・ハーン (Tabisuru boushi shousetsu Rafukadio Hān) (2000)
- ほんとうの英語がわかる 51の処方箋 (Hontou no eigo ga wakaru 51 no shohousen) (2001)
- 新ほんとうの英語がわかる ネイティブに「こころ」を伝えたい (Shin hontou no eigo ga wakaru neitibu ni "kokoro" wo tsutaetai) (2002)
- ほんとうの英会話がわかる ストーリーで学ぶ口語表現 (Hontou no eikaiwa ga wakaru sutōrī de manabu kougohyougen) (2003)
- キュート・デビルの魔法の英語 (Kyūto debiru no mahou no eigo) (2004)
- 五行でわかる日本文学 英日狂演滑稽五行詩 (5 gyō de wakaru nihon bungaku einichi kyouen kokkei gogyoushi) (2004)
- 父と暮せば 英文対訳 (Chichi to kuraseba) (2004)
- Setting the Stage : Articles and essays about the state of our world today (2005)
- 新バイブル・ストーリーズ (Shin baiburu sutōrīzu) (2007)
- わが友フロイス (Waga tomo Frois = My Friend Frois) (2007)
- 日めくり現代英語帳 (Himekuri gendai eigochō) (2007–2008)
- 英語で読み解く賢治の世界 (Eigo de yomitoku Kenji no sekai) (2008)
- Delighting in Cultures—世界の中の日本人と日本人の中の世界 (Sekai no nakano nihonjin to nihonjin no naka no sekai) (2009)
- 英語で味わう名言集 心に響く古今東西200の言葉 NHKギフト～E名言の世界～ (Eigo de ajiwau meigenshū kokoro ni hibiku kokon tōzai 200 no kotoba) (2011)
- もし、日本という国がなかったら (Moshi nihon to iu kuni ga nakattara = If There Were No Japan) (2011)
- 宮沢賢治『銀河鉄道の夜』 (NHK100分de名著) (Miyazawa Kenji "Ginga tetsudou no yoru") (2011)
- 賢治から、あなたへ 世界のすべてはつながっている (Kenji kara anatae sekai no subete wa tsunagatteiru) (2013)
- 驚くべき日本語 (Odorokubeki nihongo) (2014)
- ハーフ (Hāfu = Half) (2014)
- こんにちは、ユダヤ人です (Konnichiwa yudaya jin desu) (2014)
- 星砂物語 (Hoshizuna monogatari = STARSAND) (2015)
- 10年間勉強しても英語が上達しない日本人のための新英語学習法 (10 nenkan benkyou shitemo eigo ga jyotatsu shinai nihonjin no tameno shin eigo gakushūhou) (2015)
- 英語で読む啄木: 自己の幻想 (Eigo de yomu Takuboku: jiko no gensō) (2015)
- ぼくがアメリカ人をやめたワケ (Boku ga America jin wo yameta wake) (2020)

== Books in French ==
- Poussières d'étoiles ((Star Sand in French translation) Amazon/Crossing France 2017)
