= Horei Station =

Railway station in Ōfunato, Iwate Prefecture, Japan

Horei Station 甫嶺駅
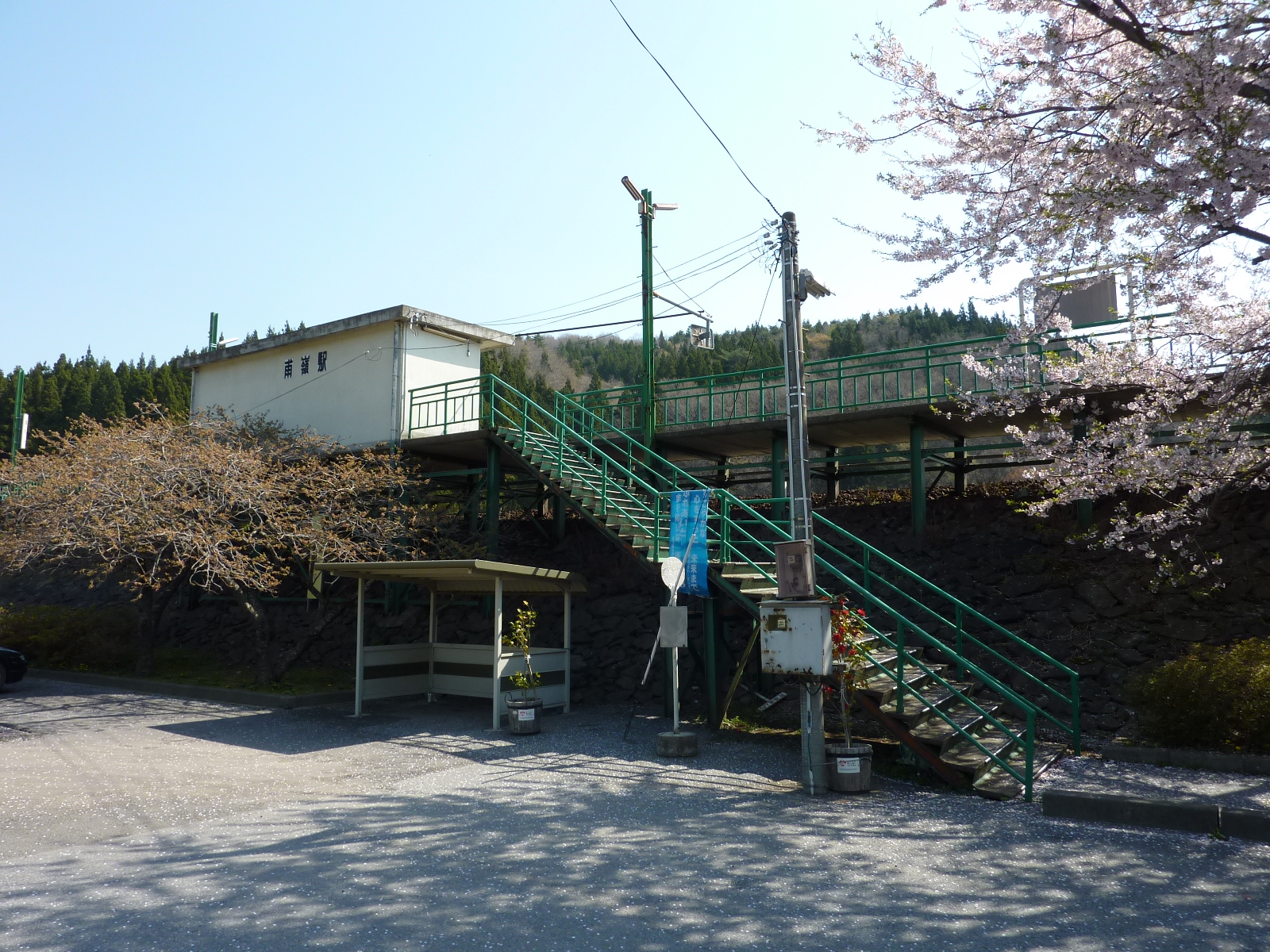
- Horei Station in May 2010

General information
- Location: Sanriku-cho Okirai-aze Horei, Ōfunato-shi, Iwate-ken 022-0101; Japan
- Coordinates: 39°05′36.3″N 141°48′23.5″E
- Operator: Sanriku Railway Company
- Line: ■ Rias Line
- Distance: 14.3 km from Sakari
- Platforms: 1 side platform
- Tracks: 1

Other information
- Status: Unstaffed
- Website: Official website

History
- Opened: 1 July 1973
- Former names: 8
Location
- Location within Japan

Horei Station (甫嶺駅, Horei-eki) is a railway station on the Sanriku Railway Company’s Rias Line located in the city of Ōfunato, Iwate Prefecture, Japan. It is 14.3 rail kilometers from the terminus of the line at Sakari Station.

== Station layout ==
Horei Station has a single elevated side platform serving one bi-directional track. There is no station building, just a shelter on the platform.

== History ==
Horei Station opened on 1 July 1973, as a station on the Japan National Railway (JNR). It was privatized on 1 April 1984, becoming a station on the Sanriku Railway. During the 11 March 2011 Tōhoku earthquake and tsunami, part of the tracks on the Minami-Rias Line were swept away, thus suspending services. The line resumed operations on 3 April 2013, between Sakari and Yoshihama. Services between Yoshihama and Kamaishi resumed on 5 April 2014. Minami-Rias Line, a portion of Yamada Line, and Kita-Rias Line constitute Rias Line on 23 March 2019. Accordingly, this station became an intermediate station of Rias Line.

== Adjacent stations ==
←	Service	→
Sanriku Railway Company
Koishihama	Local	Sanriku

== Surrounding area ==
- Horei Elementary School
- Onizawa Fishing Port

== See also ==
- List of railway stations in Japan
