= Heita Station =

Railway station in Kamaishi, Iwate Prefecture, Japan

Heita Station 平田駅
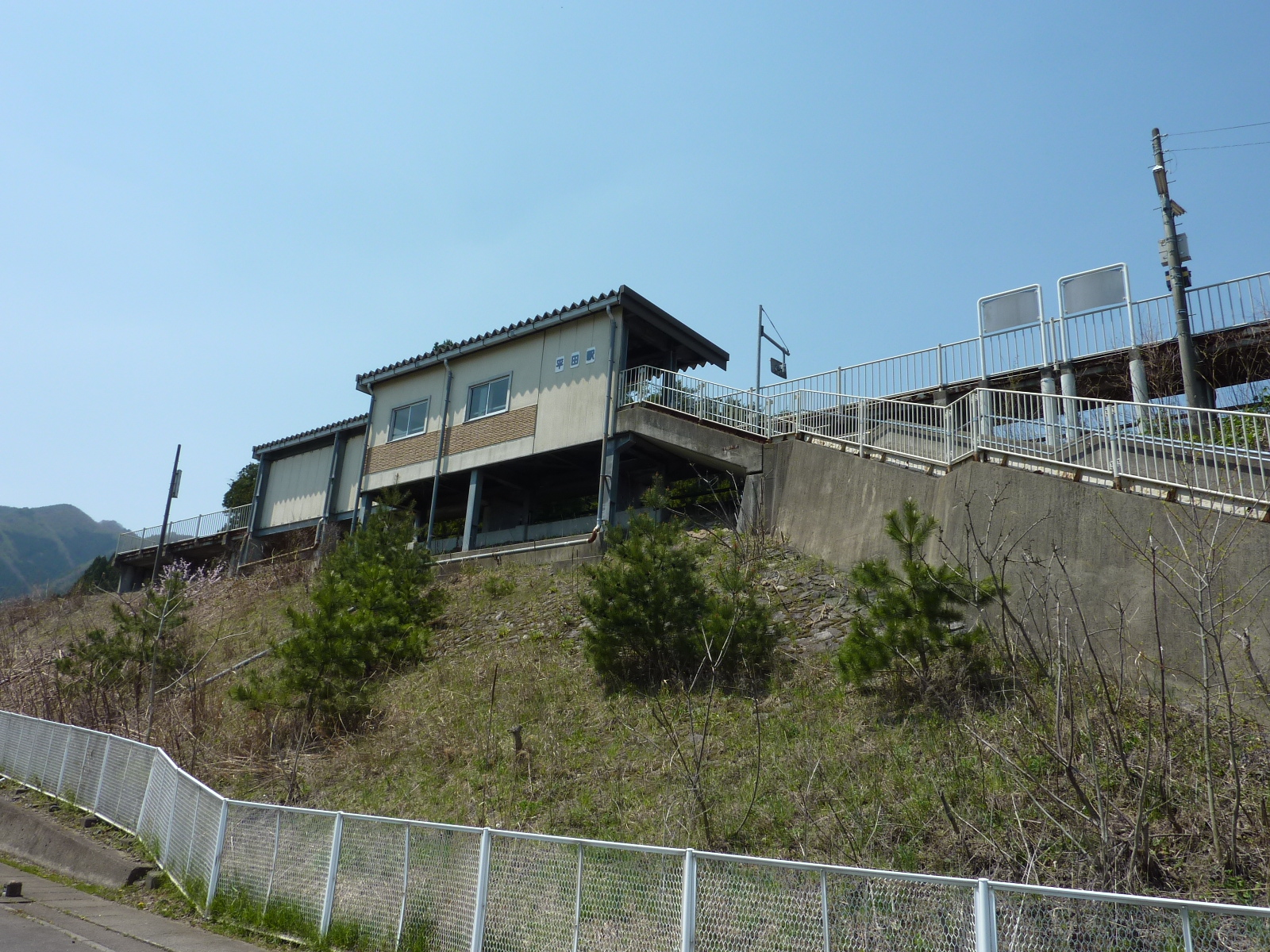
- Heita Station in May 2010

General information
- Location: Heita, Kamaishi-shi, Iwate-ken 026-0001; Japan
- Coordinates: 39°14′44.36″N 141°53′9.35″E
- Operator: Sanriku Railway Company
- Line: ■ Rias Line
- Distance: 33.1 km from Sakari
- Platforms: 1 side platform
- Tracks: 1

Construction
- Structure type: At grade

Other information
- Status: Untaffed
- Website: Official website

History
- Opened: 1 April 1984

Passengers
- FY2015: 6
Location
- Location within Japan

Heita Station (平田駅, Heita-eki) is a railway station located in the city of Kamaishi, Iwate Prefecture, Japan, operated by the third-sector railway operator Sanriku Railway Company.

== Lines ==
Heita Station is served by the Rias Line, and is 33.1 kilometers from the terminus of the line at Sakari Station.

== Station layout ==
Heita Station has a single elevated side platform serving a single bi-directional track. There is no station building, but only a weather shelter directly on the platform. The station is unattended.

== Adjacent stations ==
←	Service	→
Sanriku Railway Company
Tōni	Local	Kamaishi

== History ==
Heita Station opened on 1 April 1984. During the 11 March 2011 Tōhoku earthquake and tsunami, part of the tracks on the Minami-Rias Line were swept away, thus suspending services. The line resumed operations on 3 April 2013 between Sakari and Yoshihama. Services between Yoshihama and Kamaishi resumed on 5 April 2014. Minami-Rias Line, a portion of Yamada Line, and Kita-Rias Line constitute Rias Line on 23 March 2019. Accordingly, this station became an intermediate station of Rias Line.

== Surrounding area ==
- Heita Elementary School
- Heita Post Office
- Japan National Route 45

== See also ==
- List of railway stations in Japan
