= Ryoma Ansatsu =

Ryōma Ansatsu
- Film poster

Japanese name
- Kanji: 竜馬暗殺
Transcriptions
- Revised Hepburn: Ryōmaansatsu
- Directed by: Kazuo Kuroki
- Written by: Yasushi Tanabe; Kunio Shimizu
- Starring: Yoshio Harada; Renji Ishibashi; Yūsaku Matsuda
- Cinematography: Masaki Tamura
- Music by: Teizo Matsumura
- Production companies: Art Theatre Guild; Eiga Dōjinsha
- Distributed by: Art Theatre Guild
- Release date: August 3, 1974
- Running time: 118 minutes
- Country: Japan
- Language: Japanese

Ryōma Ansatsu (Japanese: 竜馬暗殺, Hepburn: Ryōmaansatsu; lit. 'Assassination of Ryoma') is a 1974 historical Japanese film starring Yoshio Harada, Yūsaku Matsuda, Renji Ishibashi, and Kaori Momoi, and directed by Kazuo Kuroki. It is based on the true story of the assassination of Sakamoto Ryōma.

== Plot ==
The film details the last three days in the life of Sakamoto Ryōma (1836-1867), the imperial loyalist who tried to unite the Chōshū and Satsuma clans and prepared the way for the Meiji Restoration of 1868.

== Production ==
The film is black and white.

== Cast ==
Role	Actor
Sakamoto Ryōma	Yoshio Harada
Yūta	Yūsaku Matsuda
Nakaoka Shintarō	Renji Ishibashi
	Kaori Momoi
	Rie Nakagawa
Ōkubo Toshimichi	Ryō Tamura
A Spy	Sei Hiraizumi
