= Tōni Station =

Railway station in Kamaishi, Iwate Prefecture, Japan

Tōni Station 唐丹駅
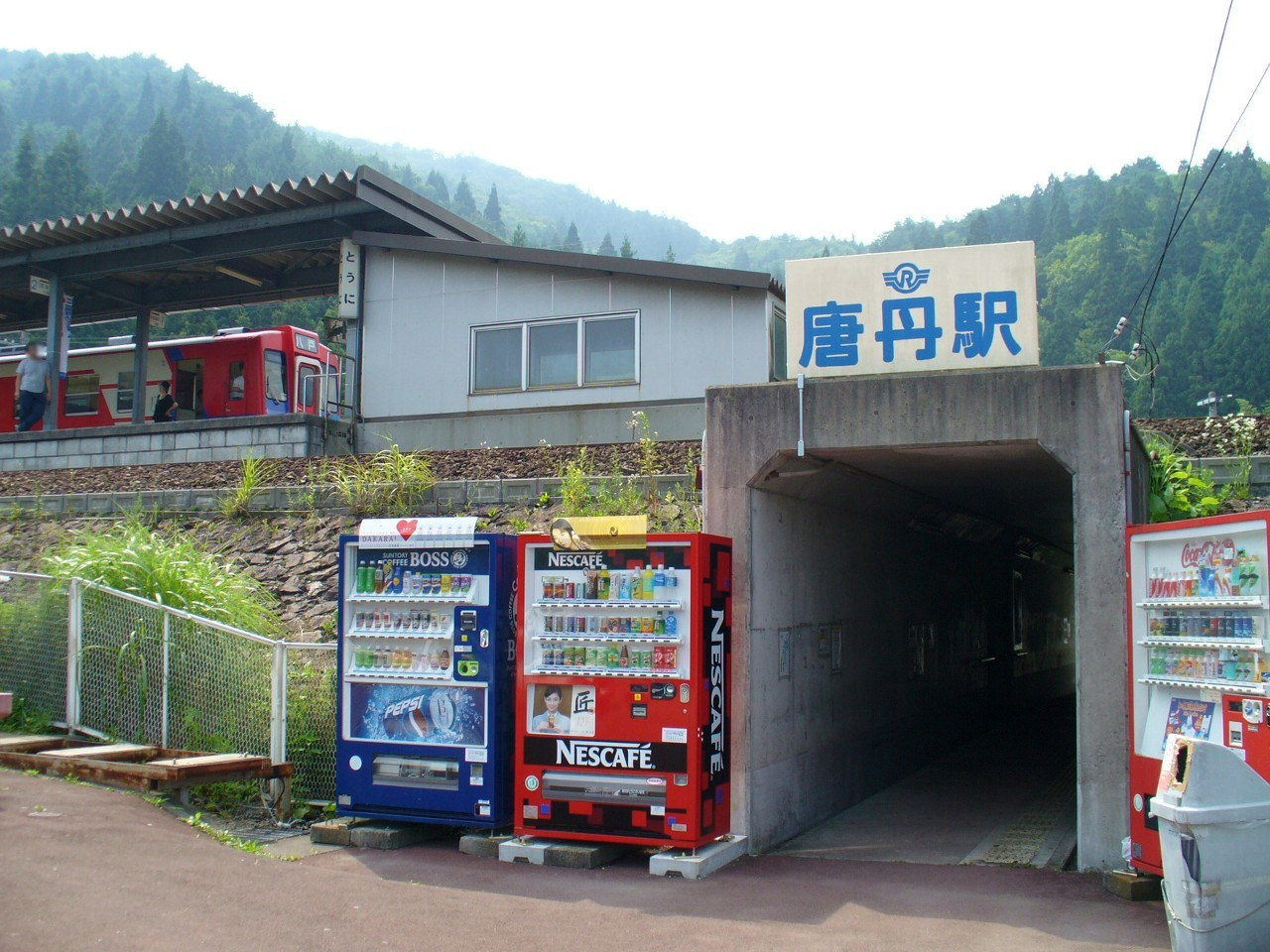
- Tōni Station in August 2005

General information
- Location: Tōni-cho, Kamaishi-shi, Iwate-ken 026-0121; Japan
- Coordinates: 39°12′7.13″N 141°51′40.68″E
- Operator: Sanriku Railway
- Line: ■ Rias Line
- Distance: 27.7 km from Sakari
- Platforms: 1 island platform
- Tracks: 2

Other information
- Status: Unstaffed
- Website: Official website

History
- Opened: 1 April 1984
- Former names: 12
Location
- Location within Japan

Tōni Station (唐丹駅, Tōni-eki) is a railway station on the Sanriku Railway Company’s Rias Line located in the city of Kamaishi, Iwate Prefecture, Japan. It is 27.7 rail kilometers from the terminus of the line at Sakari Station.

== Station layout ==
Tōni Station has a single elevated island platform. The station is unattended.

=== Platforms ===
1	■ Sanriku Railway	for Sakari
2	■ Sanriku Railway	for Kamaishi, Miyako and Kuji

== History ==
Tōni Station opened on 1 April 1984. During the 11 March 2011 Tōhoku earthquake and tsunami, part of the tracks on the Minami-Rias Line were swept away, thus suspending services. The line resumed operations on 3 April 2013 between Sakari and Yoshihama. Services between Yoshihama and Kamaishi resumed on 5 April 2014. Minami-Rias Line, a portion of Yamada Line, and Kita-Rias Line constitute Rias Line on 23 March 2019. Accordingly, this station became an intermediate station of Rias Line.

== Adjacent stations ==
←	Service	→
Sanriku Railway Company
Yoshihama	Local	Heita

== Surrounding area ==
- Tōni Elementary School
- Tōni Middle School
- Tōni Post Office
- Japan National Route 45
- List of railway stations in Japan
