= The Story of PuPu =

- Promotional card
- Directed by: Kensaku Watanabe
- Written by: Kensaku Watanabe
- Produced by: Masakazu Takei
- Starring: Sakura Uehara; Reiko Matsuo; Seijun Suzuki; Yoshio Harada
- Cinematography: Naoto Muraishi
- Edited by: Shinji Miura
- Music by: Jun Miyake
- Distributed by: Little More Co., Ltd
- Release date: April 4, 1998 (Japan)
- Running time: 73 minutes
- Country: Japan
- Language: Japanese

The Story of PuPu (Japanese: プープーの物語, Hepburn: PūPū no monogatari) is a 1998 Japanese film written and directed by Kensaku Watanabe and starring Sakura Uehara and Reiko Matsuo. The story follows two anarchistic girls on a road trip to visit the grave of a piglet named PuPu. It is Watanabe's directorial debut. Cult film director Seijun Suzuki appears in a small role.

== Cast ==
- Sakura Uehara as Suzu
- Jun Kunimura as Kijima
- Tatsushi Omori as Gesuo
- Reiko Matsuo as Fu
- Yoshio Harada as Joji
- Seijun Suzuki as the old man
- Rei Yamanaka as Trunk Man
- Mitsuaki Tuda as Iruka
- Daizo Sakurai as the golfer
