= Kamikaze Girls =

2002 Japanese novel series

- Cover of the English paperback version of the Kamikaze Girls novel

下妻物語 (Shimotsuma Monogatari)
- Genre: Comedy, drama
- Novel
- Written by: Novala Takemoto
- Published by: Shogakukan
- English publisher: Viz Media
- Published: September 2002
- Live-action film
- Directed by: Tetsuya Nakashima
- Written by: Tetsuya Nakashima
- Music by: Yoko Kanno
- Licensed by: NA: Discotek Media
- Released: May 13, 2004 (Cannes); May 29, 2004 (Japan)
- Runtime: 102 minutes
- Manga
- Written by: Novala Takemoto
- Illustrated by: Yukio Kanesada
- Published by: Shogakukan
- English publisher: Viz Media
- Imprint: Flower Comics
- Magazine: Betsucomi
- Published: 2004
- Volumes: 1

Kamikaze Girls (Japanese: 下妻物語 ヤンキーちゃんとロリータちゃん, Hepburn: Shimotsuma Monogatari: Yankī-chan to Rorīta-chan; lit. "Shimotsuma Story: Delinquent Girl and Lolita Girl"), is a 2002 Japanese novel written by Novala Takemoto. The story centers on the unlikely friendship between Momoko Ryugasaki, a Lolita, and Ichigo "Ichiko" Shirayuri, a yankī (juvenile delinquent). Kamikaze Girls was followed up with a sequel released on June 25, 2005.

A live-action film adaptation was released on May 13, 2004. In the same year, a manga adaptation by Yukio Kanesada was serialized in Betsucomi. Viz Media licensed the novel for an English-language release in North America in 2006.

== Plot ==
Momoko Ryugasaki is a high school student who admires the Rococo style and Lolita fashion. In contrast to her idyllic lifestyle, she is forced to flee her hometown Amagasaki to live in her grandmother's house in Shimotsuma, Ibaraki Prefecture, after her father, a former yakuza member, ran into legal trouble from selling counterfeit Versace apparel. Initially, Momoko is excited to move closer to Tokyo, where her favorite clothing brand Baby, the Stars Shine Bright is located, but she is dismayed at discovering Shimotsuma is a rural, countryside town. When she runs out of spending money, she resorts to selling her father's remaining merchandise. Ichigo Shirayuri, a member of the all-female biker gang Ponytails who goes by the name "Ichiko", visits Momoko frequently to purchase clothing for her gang. Despite their opposite personalities and interests, the girls develop an unlikely friendship.

When Momoko runs out of merchandise to sell, Ichiko takes her to pachinko parlors for more spending money. Momoko hits the jackpot, which draws the attention from the manager, but Ryuji comes to their defense. Ichiko falls in love with him, but she learns that he is the fiancé of Akimi, the Ponytails' leader. When Momoko tells Ichigo about her day trips to visit the Baby, the Stars Shine Bright store in Tokyo, Ichiko mentions that she would like to visit Emma, an embroidery service located in the same area, as she plans on getting her kamikaze coat embroidered to honor Akimi's marriage and retirement from the Ponytails. When the two visit Tokyo, Momoko's embroidery work catches the attention of Akinori Isobe, the founder of Baby, the Stars Shine Bright. Meanwhile, to Ichiko's disappointment, Emma has permanently closed, but Momoko offers to embroider her jacket instead.

Isobe later contacts Momoko and commissions her to embroider a jumper skirt for the store's display. She completes the embroidery on both the jumper skirt and Ichiko's jacket in three days. While visiting Baby, the Stars Shine Bright to drop off the jumper skirt, Ichiko is asked to model for the brand's catalog after one of their models is injured. At Isobe's advice, Ichiko pursues a part-time modeling career. Momoko, on the other hand, turns down Isobe's suggestion to work for Baby, the Stars Shine Bright but decides to become Ichigo's manager.

Under Miko's new leadership, the Ponytails are unhappy with Ichiko becoming a model. Likewise, Ichiko is unsatisfied with the direction of the Ponytails and decides to quit the gang. As punishment for deserting the Ponytails, they challenge her to a fight, which Momoko overhears Ichiko accepting over the phone. Concerned for Ichiko, Momoko locates their fight and causes the Ponytails to flee by throwing her grandmother's scooter and water balloons at them. The two girls ride home on Ichiko's motorbike.

== Media ==
=== Novels ===
Kamikaze Girls is written by Novala Takemoto. It is published by Shogakukan. In 2004, the novel was re-released in bunkoban paperback format. He followed up with a sequel, titled Shimotsuma Monogatari: Kan: Yankī-chan to Rorīta-chan to Satsujin Jijō in 2005. An audiobook of the second volume, narrated by Ayu Shoji, was released on April 23, 2025.

Viz Media licensed the first novel for English-language distribution in North America. They re-released the novel in 2008.

| No. | Title | Original release date | English release date |
|---|---|---|---|
| 1 | Kamikaze Girls; Shimotsuma Monogatari: Yankī-chan to Rorīta-chan (下妻物語 ヤンキーちゃんとロリータちゃん) | October 10, 2002 (hardcover); March 5, 2004 (paperback); 4093861129 (hardcover); 4094080236 (paperback) | February 7, 2006 (hardcover); January 15, 2008 (paperback); 1421502690 (hardcover); 9781421513959 (paperback) |
| 2 | Shimotsuma Monogatari: Kan: Yankī-chan to Rorīta-chan to Satsujin Jijō (下妻物語 完 ヤンキーちゃんとロリータちゃんと殺人事件) | June 25, 2005; 4093861536 | — |

=== Film ===
A live-action film adaptation of the novel directed by Tetsuya Nakashima premiered in Japan in May 2004. It starred Kyoko Fukada as Momoko and Anna Tsuchiya as Ichigo. It was filmed in the town of Shimotsuma in Ibaraki Prefecture in eastern Japan. Viz Media screened the film in select theaters in the United States in late 2005 under the title Kamikaze Girls. They released it on DVD with hardcoded English subtitles in January 2006. The DVD extras include the original Japanese film trailers, an interview with the lead actors, and a music video featuring Anna Tsuchiya. Third Window Films released Kamikaze Girls on Blu-ray in the United Kingdom in February 2010. The Blu-ray contains optional English subtitles, the same extras as the DVD, and the short film Birth of Unicorn Ryuji.

==== Cast ====
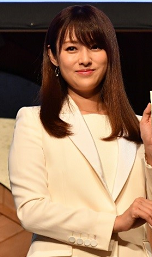
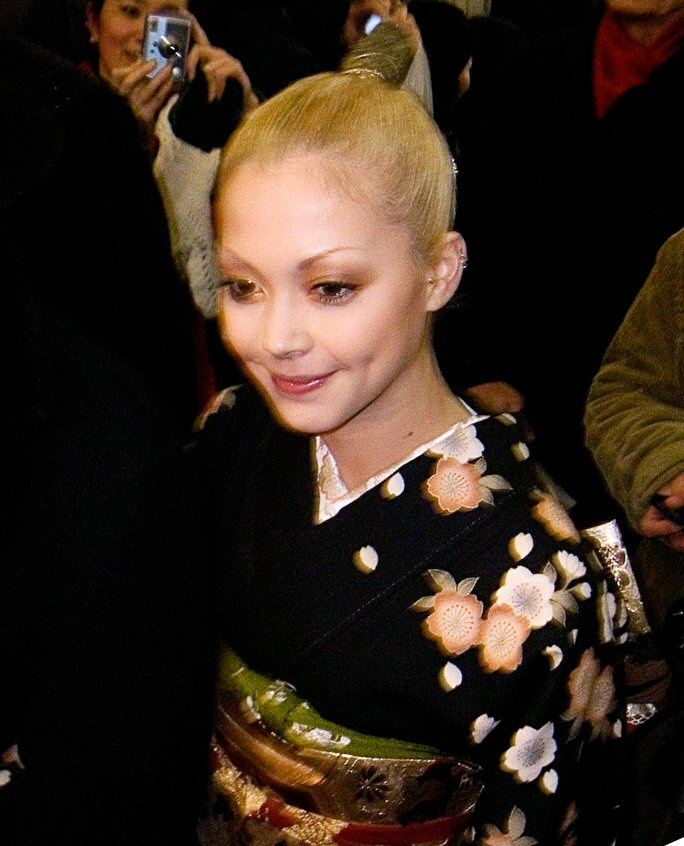
Kyoko Fukada (left, 2017) and Anna Tsuchiya (right, 2007) starred as Momoko and Ichigo in the live-action film adaptation respectively.
- Kyoko Fukada as Momoko Ryugasaki
- Anna Tsuchiya as Ichigo "Ichiko" Shirayuri
- Hiroyuki Miyasako as Momoko's father
- Ryoko Shinohara as Midori Saionji, Momoko's mother
- Sadawo Abe as "Unicorn" Ryuji
- Yoshinori Okada as Akinori Isobe
- Eiko Koike as Akimi, a gang member
- Shin Yazawa as Miko, a gang member
- Yoshiyoshi Arakawa as the grocery store manager
- Katsuhisa Namase as the pachinko parlor manager
- Hirotaro Honda as a yakuza boss
- Kirin Kiki as Momoko's grandmother

==== Crew ====
- Director – Tetsuya Nakashima
- Director of Photography – Shoichi Ato
- Production Designer – Towako Kuwashima
- Animation – Yojiro Nishimura (Studio 4°C)
- Music – Yoko Kanno

==== Reception ====
Kamikaze Girls was awarded Best Film, Best Director, Best Actress, and two other awards at the 26th Yokohama Film Festival. It also won Best Film and Best Director at the 14th Japan Film Professional Awards. For her performance in the film, Anna Tsuchiya was named Best New Actress at the Awards of the Japanese Academy, the Blue Ribbon Awards, and the Hochi Film Awards.

Review aggregation website Rotten Tomatoes gives Kamikaze Girls an approval rating of 62%, based on 29 reviews, with an average rating of 6.1/10. The film also has a 56/100 average ("mixed or average reviews") on the review aggregator Metacritic.

==== Box office ====
Released on May 29, 2004, Kamikaze Girls debuted at No. 4 on its opening weekend (behind Crimson Rivers II, Troy, and Crying Out Love in the Center of the World).

=== Manga ===
The manga adaptation of Kamikaze Girls was illustrated by Yukio Kanesada and serialized in Shogakukan's Betsucomi magazine in 2004. Shogakukan collected the chapters into a single tankōbon (bound volume) and published it in June 2004. The manga's storyline is a condensed version of the original novel and only takes up about half of the volume; the latter half contains a bonus story in which Ichigo falls in love with the twin brother of the boy she loved in the novel. Viz Media licensed the manga for an English-language release in North America. A preview first appeared in the November 2005 issue of their Shojo Beat magazine. Viz published the full volume on February 7, 2006.
