= 14th Japan Film Professional Awards =

Japanese film awards in 2005

- Date: 2005

The 14th Japan Film Professional Awards (第14回日本映画プロフェッショナル大賞) is the 14th edition of the Japan Film Professional Awards. Films of 2004 were eligible, with a focus on independent works not released by major distribution companies. An award ceremony did not take place.

== Awards ==
- Best Film: Kamikaze Girls
- Best Director: Hiroshi Takahashi (Sodom no Ichi)
- Best Director: Tetsuya Nakashima (Kamikaze Girls)
- Best Actress: Yū Aoi (Hana and Alice)
- Best Actor: Ryo Kase (Antenna)
- Best New Director: Izuru Narushima (Yudan Taiteki)

== 10 best films ==
1. Kamikaze Girls (Tetsuya Nakashima)
2. Ramblers (Nobuhiro Yamashita)
3. Swing Girls (Shinobu Yaguchi)
4. Sodom no Ichi (Hiroshi Takahashi)
5. Yudan Taiteki (Izuru Narushima)
6. Nobody Knows (Hirokazu Koreeda)
7. Inuneko (Nami Iguchi)
8. A Larva to Love (Noboru Iguchi)
9. Takada Wataru Teki (Yuki Tanada)
10. Tokyo: Level One (Gen Yamakawa)
