= The Blossoming of Kamiya Etsuko =

- Film poster
- Directed by: Kazuo Kuroki
- Written by: Kazuo Kuroki; Hideki Yamada; Masataka Matsuda (play)
- Starring: Tomoyo Harada; Masatoshi Nagase
- Cinematography: Koichi Kawakami
- Edited by: Yoshiyuki Okuhara
- Music by: Teizo Matsumura
- Production companies: Bandai Visual; AD-GEAR; TV Asahi; Wako; Pal Entertainments
- Distributed by: Pal Entertainments
- Release date: August 12, 2006 (Japan)
- Running time: 111 minutes
- Country: Japan
- Language: Japanese

The Blossoming of Kamiya Etsuko (Japanese: 紙屋悦子の青春, Hepburn: Kamiya Etsuko no Seishun) is a play written by Masataka Matsuda. A film adaptation, co-written and directed by Kazuo Kuroki and starring Tomoyo Harada and Masatoshi Nagase, was released in Japan on August 12, 2006. It was Kuroki's final film, as he died several months before its release.

== Plot ==
In Kagoshima, in the final days of World War II, an offer of marriage comes to Etsuko Kamiya, who lives with her brother and his wife. The offer comes from her boyfriend Nagayo, a lieutenant in a Special Attack Unit. However, Etsuko becomes attracted to his naval officer friend, Akashi. Before he takes off on a kamikaze suicide mission, Nagayo attempts to arrange a marriage between the two.

== Cast ==
- Tomoyo Harada as Etsuko Kamiya
- Masatoshi Nagase as Ensign Nagayo
- Shunsuke Matsuoka as Ensign Akashi
- Manami Honjo as Fusa Kamiya
- Kaoru Kobayashi as Yasutada Kamiya

== Awards ==
- 31st Hochi Movie Award as Special Prize
- 61st Mainichi Film Award as Cinematographic Award (Koichi Kawakami)
- 21st Takasaki Film Festival as Best Actress in a Supporting Role (Manami Honjo)
- Kinema Junpo Japanese Movie Best 10 in 2006 as 4th Place
- Japanese Film Pen Club in 2006 as 2nd Place in Japanese films
