= Kosano Station =

Railway station in Kamaishi, Iwate Prefecture, Japan

Kosano Station 小佐野駅
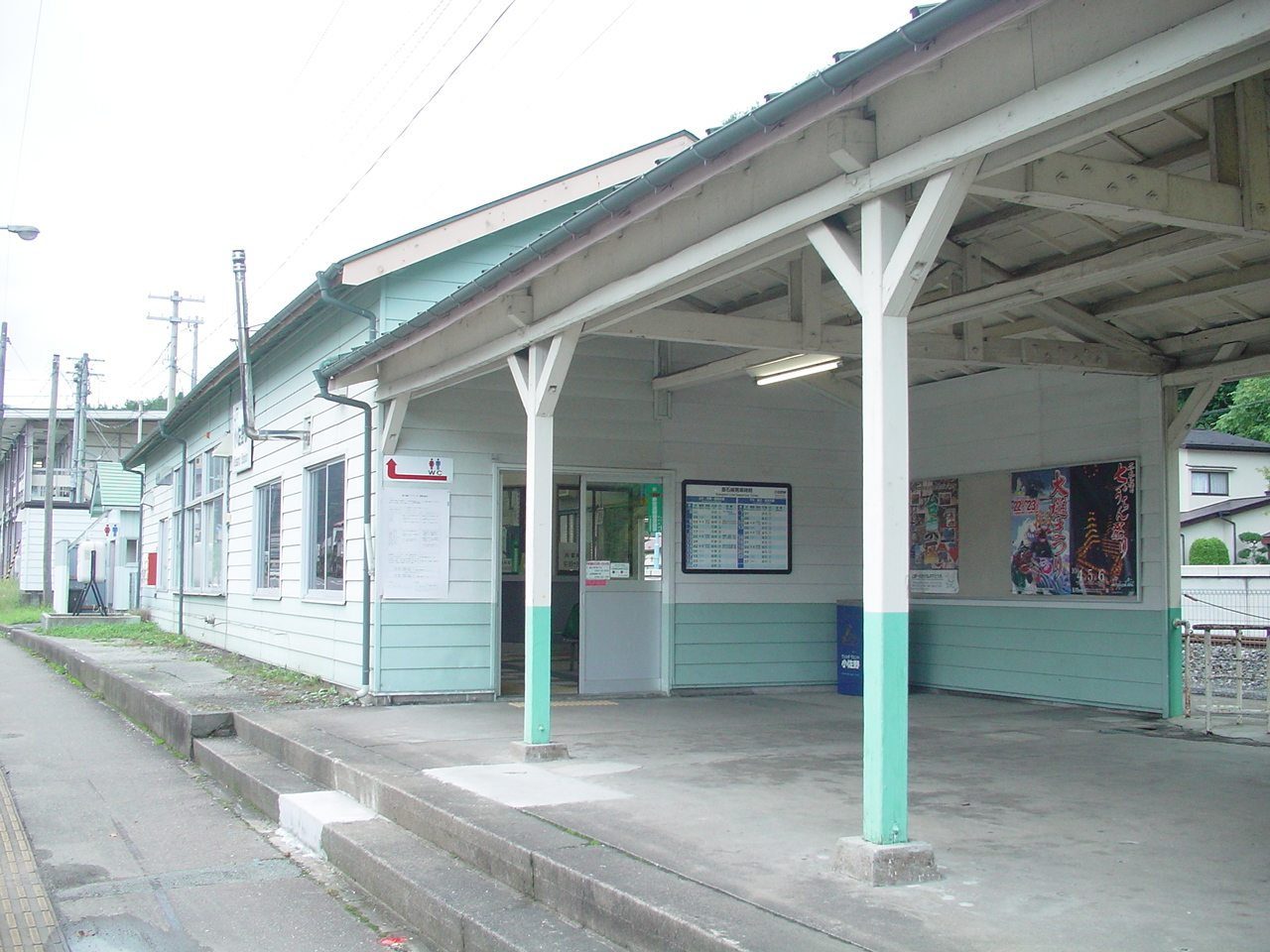
- Kosano Station in September 2007

General information
- Location: 1-6-1 Kosano, Kamaishi-shi, Iwate-ken 026-0052; Japan
- Coordinates: 39.2647°N 141.8367°E
- Operator: JR East
- Line: ■ Kamaishi Line
- Distance: 86.5 km from Hanamaki
- Platforms: 1 island platform
- Tracks: 2

Construction
- Structure type: At grade

Other information
- Status: Staffed (Midori no Madoguchi)
- Website: Official website

History
- Opened: 15 June 1945

Passengers
- FY2018: 46

Services
Preceding station	JR East	Following station
Matsukura (limited service) towards Hanamaki	Kamaishi Line Rapid Hamayuri	Kamaishi Terminus
Matsukura towards Hanamaki	Kamaishi Line Local	Kamaishi Terminus
Location
- Location within Iwate Prefecture Location within Japan

Kosano Station (小佐野駅, Kosano-eki) is a railway station in the city of Kamaishi, Iwate, Japan, operated by East Japan Railway Company (JR East).

== Lines ==
Kosano Station is served by the Kamaishi Line, and is located 86.5 kilometers from the starting point of the line at Hanamaki Station.

== Station layout ==
The station has a single island platform. The station has a Midori no Madoguchi staffed ticket office.

=== Platforms ===
1	■ Kamaishi Line	for Tōno, Hanamaki, and Morioka
2	■ Kamaishi Line	for Miyako and Kamaishi

== History ==
Kosano Station opened on 15 June 1945. The station was absorbed into the JR East network upon the privatization of the Japanese National Railways (JNR) on 1 April 1987.

== Passenger statistics ==
In fiscal 2018, the station was used by an average of 46 passenger daily (boarding passengers only).

== Surrounding area ==
- National Route 283
- Kosano Post Office
- Kamaishi City Library

== See also ==
- List of railway stations in Japan
