= Preparation for the Festival =

- Poster for Preparation for the Festival.

Japanese name
- Kanji: 祭りの準備
- Directed by: Kuroki Kazuo
- Written by: Takehiro Nakajima
- Produced by: Kazu Ôtsuka
- Starring: Jun Etô; Haruko Mabuchi; Hajime Hana; Yoshio Harada
- Cinematography: Tatsuo Suzuki
- Edited by: Hiroshi Asai
- Music by: Teizo Matsumura
- Distributed by: Art Theatre Guild
- Release date: November 8, 1975 (Japan)
- Running time: 117 minutes
- Country: Japan
- Language: Japanese

Preparation for the Festival (Japanese: 祭りの準備, Hepburn: Matsuri no junbi) is a 1975 Japanese film directed by Kuroki Kazuo.

== Plot ==
Tateo (Jun Etô), a mother-dominated young man who realizes that he must leave the place he loves, finding it too closed and constricting. With great affection and insight, Kuroki characterizes the villagers who surround Tateo: his neurotic mother and philandering father, who lives across town with his mistress; his grandfather, who is obsessed with the idea that he fathered a child by a promiscuous young girl; a drunken friend, etc.

== Cast ==
- Jun Eto
- Yoshio Harada
- Miki Sugimoto
- Hajime Hana
- Hiroshi Inuzuka
- Keiko Takeshita
- Jun Hamamura

== Awards and nominations ==
Blue Ribbon Awards

- Won: Best Supporting Actor - Yoshio Harada
