= Sanriku Station =

Railway station in Ōfunato, Iwate Prefecture, Japan

Sanriku Station 三陸駅
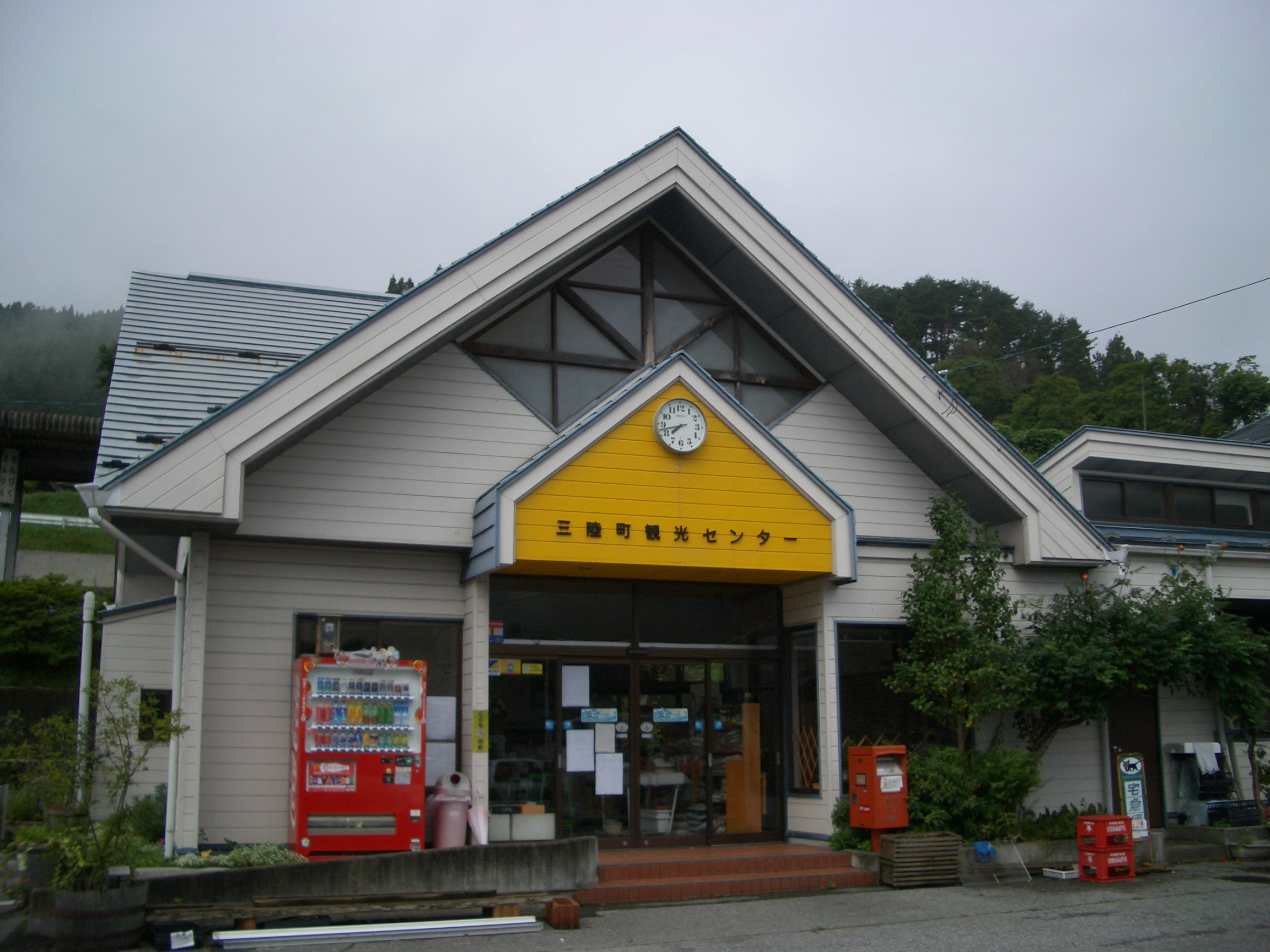
- Sanriku Station in September 2008

General information
- Location: Sanriku-cho Okirai, Ōfunato-shi, Iwate-ken 022-0101; Japan
- Coordinates: 39°07′20.9″N 141°48′36″E
- Operator: Sanriku Railway Company
- Line: ■Rias Line
- Distance: 17.0 km from Sakari
- Platforms: 1 island platform
- Tracks: 2

Other information
- Status: Staffed
- Website: Official website

History
- Opened: 1 July 1973
- Former names: 24
Location
- Location within Japan

Sanriku Station (三陸駅, Sanriku-eki) is a railway station on the Sanriku Railway Company’s Rias Line located in the city of Ōfunato, Iwate Prefecture, Japan. It is 17.0 rail kilometers from the terminus of the line at Sakari Station.

== Station layout ==
Sanriku Station has a single elevated island platform. The station is staffed.

=== Platforms ===
1	■ Sanriku Railway	for Sakari
2	■ Sanriku Railway	for Kamaishi, Miyako and Kuji

== History ==
Sanriku Station opened on 1 July 1973 as a station on the Japan National Railway (JNR). It was privatized on 1 April 1984, becoming a station on the Sanriku Railway. During the 11 March 2011 Tōhoku earthquake and tsunami, part of the tracks on the Minami-Rias Line were swept away, thus suspending services. The line resumed operations on 3 April 2013 between Sakari and Yoshihama. Services between Yoshihama and Kamaishi resumed on 5 April 2014. Minami-Rias Line, a portion of Yamada Line, and Kita-Rias Line constitute Rias Line on 23 March 2019. Accordingly, this station became an intermediate station of Rias Line.

== Adjacent stations ==
←	Service	→
Sanriku Railway Company
Horei	Local	Yoshihama

== Surrounding area ==
- former Sanriku Town Hall
- Sanriku Post Office
- Japan National Route 45

== See also ==
- List of railway stations in Japan
