= Kamaishi =

Kamaishi 釜石市
- City
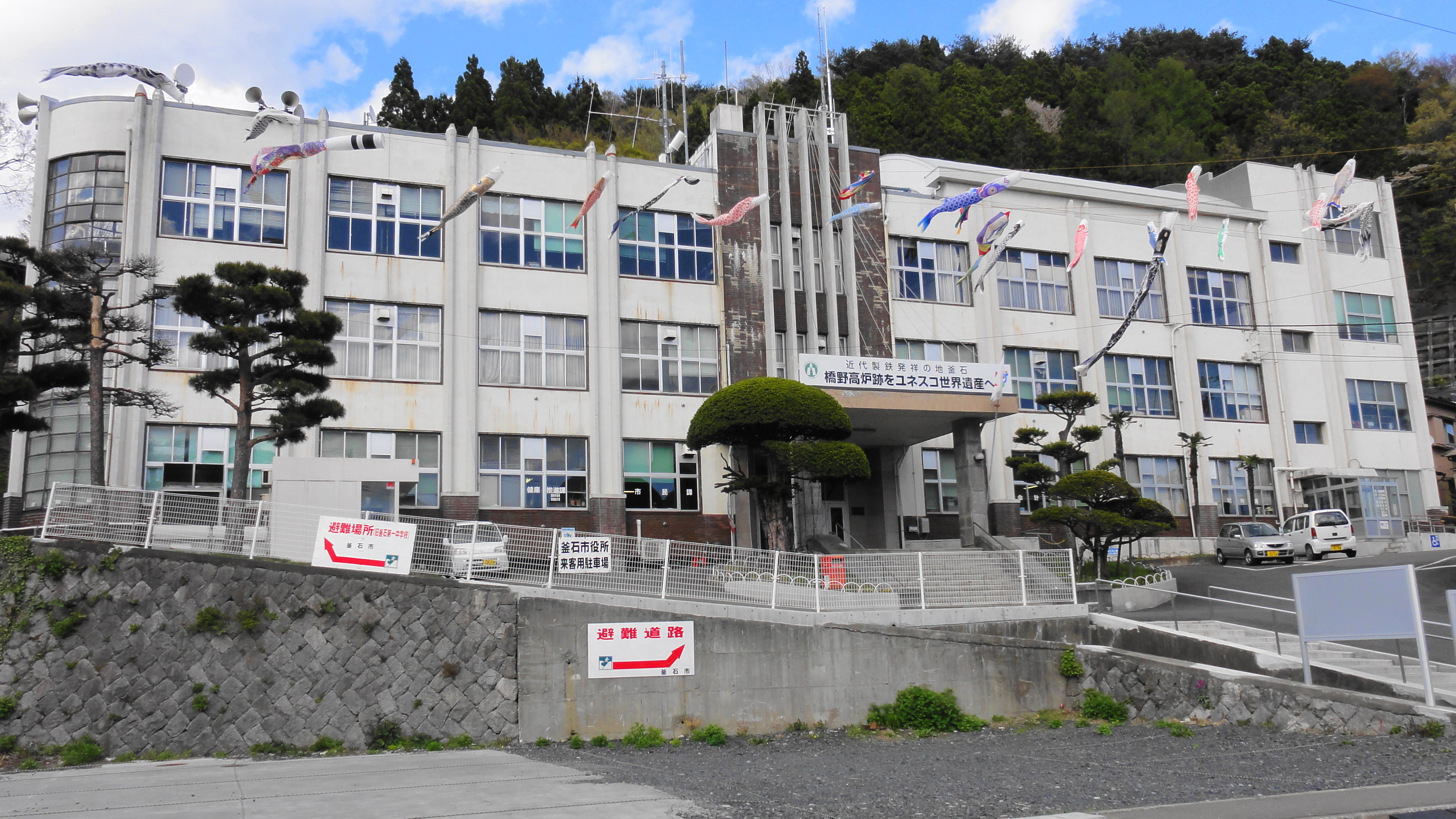
- Kamaishi City Hall, May 2013

- Flag Seal

- Location of Kamaishi in Iwate Prefecture

- Coordinates: 39°16′32.9″N 141°53′8.5″E
- Country: Japan
- Region: Tōhoku
- Prefecture: Iwate Prefecture

Government
  - Mayor: Takenori Noda

Area
  - Total: 440.34 km^{2} (170.02 sq mi)

Population (October 10, 2020)
  - Total: 32,078
  - Density: 72.848/km^{2} (188.68/sq mi)
- Time zone: UTC+9 (Japan Standard Time)
- Phone number: 0193-22-2111
- Address: 3-9-13, Tadakoechō, Kamaishi-shi, Iwate-ken; 026-8686
- Climate: Cfa
- Website: Official website
- Symbols
- Bird: Streaked shearwater
- Flower: Sukashiyuri (Lilium pseudolirion)
- Tree: Tabunoki (Machilus thunbergii)

Kamaishi (釜石市, Kamaishi-shi) is a city located on the Sanriku coast in Iwate Prefecture, Japan. As of 31 March 2020, the city had an estimated population of 32,609, and a population density of 74 persons per km^{2}, in 16,230 households. The total area of the city is 441.43 square kilometres (170.44 sq mi)

== Geography ==
Kamaishi is located in the Kitakami Mountains of south-central Iwate Prefecture, with the Pacific Ocean to the east. The spectacular, rugged coast of Kamaishi is entirely within the Sanriku Fukkō National Park. There are four large bays, Ōtsuchi Bay in the north, Ryōishi Bay, Kamaishi Bay and Tōni Bay in the south. Each is separated by large, rocky, pine-covered peninsulas which jut out into the Pacific Ocean. Immediately the rocky cliffs develop into hills rising to 400 or 500 metres (1,300 or 1,600 ft) along the coast and 1,200 or 1,300 metres (3,900 or 4,300 ft) farther inland.

The highest point in Kamaishi is Mount Goyōzan in the southwest at 1,341.3 meters in elevation. Most of the land is mountainous, allowing for little agriculture. The main rivers are the Kasshigawa River which empties into Kamaishi Bay and the Unosumai River which empties into Ōtsuchi Bay. Both have small floodplains that allow for development and agriculture.

=== Neighboring municipalities ===
Iwate Prefecture

- Ōfunato to the south
- Ōtsuchi to the north
- Sumita to the west
- Tōno to the west

=== Climate ===
Kamaishi has a humid subtropical climate (Köppen Cfa) characterized by mild summers and cold winters. The average annual temperature in Kamaishi is 10.1 °C. The average annual rainfall is 1453 mm with September as the wettest month and February as the driest month. The temperatures are highest on average in August, at around 22.5 °C, and lowest in January, at around -0.8 °C.

Climate data for Kamaishi (elevation 5 m, 1991–2020 normals, extremes 1976–present)
Month	Jan	Feb	Mar	Apr	May	Jun	Jul	Aug	Sep	Oct	Nov	Dec	Year
Record high °C (°F)	15.9 (60.6)	20.4 (68.7)	24.7 (76.5)	31.3 (88.3)	34.7 (94.5)	37.8 (100.0)	38.4 (101.1)	38.8 (101.8)	37.8 (100.0)	31.4 (88.5)	26.6 (79.9)	23.0 (73.4)	38.8 (101.8)
Mean daily maximum °C (°F)	5.3 (41.5)	5.9 (42.6)	9.3 (48.7)	14.9 (58.8)	19.6 (67.3)	22.1 (71.8)	25.5 (77.9)	27.5 (81.5)	24.4 (75.9)	19.4 (66.9)	14.0 (57.2)	8.1 (46.6)	16.4 (61.5)
Daily mean °C (°F)	1.3 (34.3)	1.6 (34.9)	4.5 (40.1)	9.6 (49.3)	14.4 (57.9)	17.6 (63.7)	21.4 (70.5)	23.2 (73.8)	19.9 (67.8)	14.3 (57.7)	8.8 (47.8)	3.8 (38.8)	11.7 (53.1)
Mean daily minimum °C (°F)	−2.4 (27.7)	−2.4 (27.7)	0.0 (32.0)	4.7 (40.5)	9.8 (49.6)	13.9 (57.0)	18.2 (64.8)	19.8 (67.6)	16.2 (61.2)	10.0 (50.0)	4.1 (39.4)	−0.1 (31.8)	7.7 (45.9)
Record low °C (°F)	−11.4 (11.5)	−12.9 (8.8)	−9.2 (15.4)	−4.2 (24.4)	0.3 (32.5)	3.1 (37.6)	8.3 (46.9)	9.9 (49.8)	6.2 (43.2)	0.0 (32.0)	−4.9 (23.2)	−10.1 (13.8)	−12.9 (8.8)
Average precipitation mm (inches)	63.1 (2.48)	52.0 (2.05)	112.3 (4.42)	128.0 (5.04)	153.3 (6.04)	177.6 (6.99)	180.9 (7.12)	205.1 (8.07)	253.9 (10.00)	197.4 (7.77)	91.6 (3.61)	71.8 (2.83)	1,687 (66.42)
Average precipitation days (≥ 1.0 mm)	5.4	5.9	8.4	9.1	9.7	10.4	12.6	11.4	11.9	9.2	6.9	5.9	106.9
Mean monthly sunshine hours	150.3	150.8	172.2	186.4	188.1	152.3	138.1	156.6	128.4	142.2	142.1	134.2	1,841.7
Source: Japan Meteorological Agency

== Demographics ==
According to Japanese census data, the population of Kamaishi peaked around the year 1960 has declined steadily over the past 60 years.

Historical population
Year	Pop.	±%
1920	33,392	—
1930	44,310	+32.7%
1940	62,136	+40.2%
1950	68,063	+9.5%
1960	87,511	+28.6%
1970	72,923	−16.7%
1980	65,250	−10.5%
1990	52,484	−19.6%
2000	46,521	−11.4%
2010	39,568	−14.9%
2020	32,078	−18.9%

== History ==
=== Pre-Meiji Kamaishi ===
The area of present-day Kamaishi was part of ancient Mutsu Province, and has been settled since at least the Jōmon period. The area was inhabited by the Emishi people, and came under the control of the imperial dynasty during the early Heian period. During the Sengoku period, the area was dominated by various samurai clans before coming under the control of the Nambu clan during the Edo period, who ruled Morioka Domain under the Tokugawa shogunate. Before the discovery of magnetite in 1727, Kamaishi was little different from any of the other small fishing communities along the coast. However, it was not until 1857, and the construction of the first small blast furnace, that any real changes could be seen. In the 1850s, the feudal domains of Japan were engaged in an arms race to develop the first Western-style armaments, particularly large guns. The Nanbu Domain constructed blast furnaces of a foreign design in Kamaishi under the direction of military engineer Takatō Ōshima. Ten furnaces were built in all but some were owned by private corporations. The first of these furnaces was lit on December 1, 1857; a day honored as the start of modern iron production in Japan.

=== Early modern Kamaishi ===
In the Meiji period establishment of the modern municipalities system, the town of Kamaishi was established within Minamihei District, Iwate on April 1, 1889. Minamihei and Nishihei Districts merged to form Kamihei District in 1896. Kamaishi attained city status on May 5, 1937, and expanded in 1955 with the absorption of the neighboring villages of Kasshi, Unosumai, Kurihashi from Kamihei District and the village of Tōni from Kesen District.

In 1875, the newly established Meiji government bought all of the furnaces and created the Kamaishi Iron Works. They also put Ōshima and a German engineer in charge of its modernization. The German director imported two large steam-driven blast furnaces of the latest design from Britain and set up a railway with 15 miles of track and a locomotive purchased from Manchester to deliver the ore. Production began in 1880 but had to be stopped soon after due to a lack of charcoal. An attempt to resume operations in 1882 by replacing charcoal with coke failed and the plant was closed.

There were cholera outbreaks in Kamaishi in July 1882 and April 1884. The first left 302 people dead and warnings about the drinking water were posted throughout the prefecture.

In 1885, a new foundry was established which used coal from Hokkaido and iron ore from China.

The 1896 Sanriku earthquake struck on June 15 at 7:32 pm while families were celebrating Boy's Festival on the beach. The earthquake measured magnitude 8.5 while the tsunami on the Iwate coast reached as high as 24 meters in places – the highest ever recorded in Japan at the time. The city of Kamaishi was completely destroyed. The French Catholic missionary Henri Lispard was also swept out to sea and died when the wave struck.

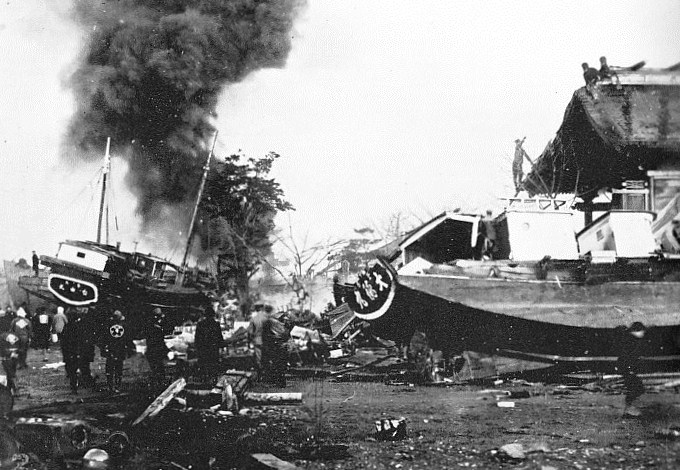
A devastating earthquake and tsunami affected Kamaishi in March 1933

=== Kamaishi in WWII ===
As an important foundry town, Kamaishi played a significant role in the Japanese war effort and was targeted by the U.S. Navy during World War II. On 14 July 1945, under the command of Rear Admiral John F. Shafroth Jr., the battleships USS South Dakota, Indiana, Massachusetts, and Alabama, the heavy cruisers Chicago and Quincy, and nine destroyers bombarded the Japan Ironworks and warehouses, along with nearby oil tanks and vessels, to great effect. This was the first naval bombardment of the Japanese mainland. Later, on 9 August 1945, the battleships & heavy cruisers of the same group attacked Kamaishi again, this time joined by a small detachment of Royal Navy ships, most notably light cruisers HMS Newfoundland and HMNZS Gambia.

The iron mill was also the site of the Sendai Prisoner of War Camp, and 32 Allied prisoners were killed in the raids. A total of 694 civilians and 30 Japanese military personnel were killed in the bombardment.

=== Kamaishi after WWII ===
Kamaishi played its part in Japan's post-war boom, continuing its reputation as a steel town, a reputation reflected in the name of its rugby team - the Kamaishi Nippon Steel Rugby Club. In 1960, the town was crippled by a tsunami generated by the Great Chilean Earthquake. However, following the closure of the steel mills in 1988, the economy of the city collapsed, and almost half its population moved away. Kamaishi is now known more for commercial fishing than heavy industry. On September 30, 2010, Foreign Policy magazine used Kamaishi as an example of Japan's relative decline in the Lost Decade.

=== 2011 Tōhoku earthquake and tsunami ===
Kamaishi was heavily damaged by the 2011 Tōhoku earthquake and tsunami, in which 1,250 city residents were killed or are missing; at least 4 of the town's 69 designated evacuation sites and three of the town's 14 schools were inundated. Of the 2,900 students who attended the town's schools, five elementary or junior high school students were killed or are missing.

Tsunami waves as tall as 14 ft (4.3 m) surmounted the 1,950 m (6,400 ft) long and 63 m (207 ft) deep Kamaishi Tsunami Protection Breakwater, which had been completed in March 2009, after three decades of construction, at a cost of $1.5 billion. It was once recognized by the Guinness World Records as the world's deepest breakwater. The subsequent decision to rebuild the breakwater at a cost of over $650 million was criticised as "a waste of money that aims to protect an area of rapidly declining population with technology that is a proven failure".

Numerous news videos were broadcast of the city, which can be recognized by a large green crane in the background and water rushing against tall buildings at the edge of the city.

== Government ==
Kamaishi has a mayor-council form of government with a directly elected mayor and a unicameral city legislature of 19 members. Kamaishi, together with the town of Ōtsuchi collectively contributes two seats to the Iwate Prefectural legislature. In terms of national politics, the city is part of Iwate 2nd district of the lower house of the Diet of Japan.

== Economy ==
Kamaishi was famous in modern times for its steel production, although after the closure of the blast furnace at Nippon Steel Kamaishi Iron and Steel Works and the scaling down of production in 1989, the local economy suffered greatly. The city has most recently made strong efforts towards promotion of eco-tourism. In 2015, the Hashino iron mining and smelting site was accepted as a UNESCO World Heritage Site as part of the Sites of Japan's Meiji Industrial Revolution: Iron and Steel, Shipbuilding and Coal Mining. Commercial fishing and shellfish production are also important economic activities.

== Education ==
Kamaishi has nine public elementary schools, five public junior high schools operated by the city board of education, and three public high schools operated by the Iwate Prefectural Board of Education. The prefecture also operates one special education school for the handicapped.

== Sports ==
Kamaishi was the home to one of Japan's most successful rugby union clubs, Nippon Steel Kamaishi, which existed from 1959 to 2001 and won several national titles during the 1970s and 1980s. The club was succeeded by the modern Kamaishi Seawaves. As part of the post-disaster recovery of the region, Kamaishi hosted part of the 2019 Rugby World Cup at a new stadium holding 16,000 spectators.

Kamaishi won the "Award for Character" of the Rugby World Cup 2019 awards.

The city also has a semi-professional association football club, Nippon Steel Corp. Kamaishi S.C., which plays in the 5th division Tohoku Soccer League.

== Transportation ==
=== Railway ===
East Japan Railway Company (JR East) - Kamaishi Line

- Rikuchū-Ōhashi - Dōsen - Matsukura - Kosano - Kamaishi

Sanriku Railway – Rias Line

- Tōni - Heita - Kamaishi

=== Highway ===
- Sanriku Expressway
- Kamaishi Expressway
- National Route 45
- National Route 283

=== Port ===
- Port of Kamaishi

== Local attractions ==
- Hashino iron mining and smelting site, a UNESCO World Heritage Site
- Sanriku Fukkō National Park

== International relations ==
- Digne-les-Bains, France since April 20, 1994

== Noted people from Kamaishi ==
- Toshiya Miura, professional soccer manager
- Makoto Sawaguchi, professional basketball player
- Yu Suzuki, video game creator
- Katsuhiko Takahashi, writer
