= Tetsuya Nakashima =

Japanese film director and screenwriter (born 1959)

- Born: September 2, 1959 (age 66); Fukuoka, Japan
- Occupation: Film director

Tetsuya Nakashima (中島哲也) (born 1959) is a Japanese film director and screenwriter.

He was born in Fukuoka, attending high school in Chikushino. His 2010 film Confessions was awarded Best Picture at the Japanese Academy Awards, where Nakashima was also awarded Director of the Year and Screenplay of the Year. At the Asian Film Awards, the film was nominated for Best Film and Best Director, among other categories. Confessions was also selected as the Japanese entry for Best Foreign Language Film at the 83rd Academy Awards and made the final shortlist in January 2011. Nakashima was given the Best Director award at the 2005 Yokohama Film Festival for his film Kamikaze Girls, which also won Best Film. For Kamikaze Girls, he also won Best Film and Best Director at the 14th Japan Film Professional Awards. His 2006 film Memories of Matsuko received 14 nominations at the 30th Japanese Academy Awards, including Picture of the Year and Director of the Year. In 2014, he was nominated for the Audience Choice Award at the Chicago International Film Festival, for his film The World of Kanako.

He was originally slated to direct an adaptation of the hit manga Attack on Titan, but in December 2012 he left the project due to differences with the rest of the production team.

== Filmography ==
- Bakayaro! I'm Plenty Mad (1988) (segment 2)
- Happy-Go-Lucky (1997)
- Beautiful Sunday (1998)
- Kamikaze Girls (2004)
- Rolling Bomber Special (2005)
- Memories of Matsuko (2006)
- Paco and the Magical Picture Book (2008)
- Confessions (2010)
- The World of Kanako (2014)
- It Comes (2018)
- The Brightest Sun (2026)
