= Yūgure made =

- Theatrical release poster
- Directed by: Kazuo Kuroki
- Screenplay by: Ichiro Hamachi; Yasushi Tanabe
- Story by: Junosuke Yoshiyuki
- Produced by: Kazuo Otsuka; Namio Miura
- Starring: Kaori Momoi; Juzo Itami; Morio Kazama
- Cinematography: Tatsuo Suzuki
- Music by: Ichiro Araki
- Production company: Art Center Production
- Distributed by: Toho
- Release date: 20 September 1980 (Japan)
- Running time: 109 minutes
- Country: Japan
- Language: Japanese

Yūgure made (Japanese: 夕暮まで), also known as Until Evening, is a 1980 Japanese film directed by Kazuo Kuroki.

== Release ==
Yūgure made was received a roadshow theatrical release in Japan on September 20, 1980 where it was distributed by Toho. It received a general release on October 4, 1980.

== Awards ==
2nd Yokohama Film Festival

- Won: Best Supporting Actor – Morio Kazama
