= Ōshima Takatō =

Japanese engineer

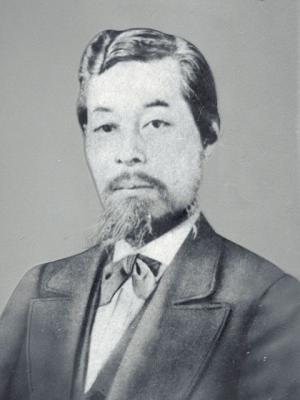

Ōshima Takatō (大島 高任, May 11, 1826–March 29, 1901) was a Japanese engineer who created the first reverberation blast furnace in Japan.

Ōshima was born of samurai status in Morioka City, Nanbu Domain which is now Iwate Prefecture in 1826.

Around this time, the feudal clans of Japan were competing to develop advanced Western-style guns. The government of Mito Domain hired Ōshima to make Western-style guns. In 1855, the first of two reverberation blast furnaces that he built in Mito was completed. This furnace was used to make four mortars over the next year. These mortars, however, failed due to the use of poor quality iron.

Ōshima returned to Nanbu-han where he built a new Western-style blast furnace at Kamaishi to produce a higher quality pig iron from the local magnetite mined there. For this work he was assisted by an engineer on loan from the Satsuma Domain. They used a design from a Dutch book Het Gietwezen In's Rijks Ijzer-geschutgieterij Te Luik by Huguenin. Their efforts were rewarded with success on December 1, 1857 when they fired the new furnace for the first time.

Returning to Mito the next year, Ōshima successfully produced three mortars and one cannon. In April, a large shipment of pig iron arrived from Kamaishi and he produced three more large cannons. After 1868, he helped in the development of Japan's mining operations.
