= Hisashi Inoue =

Japanese playwright and writer

- 井上 ひさし
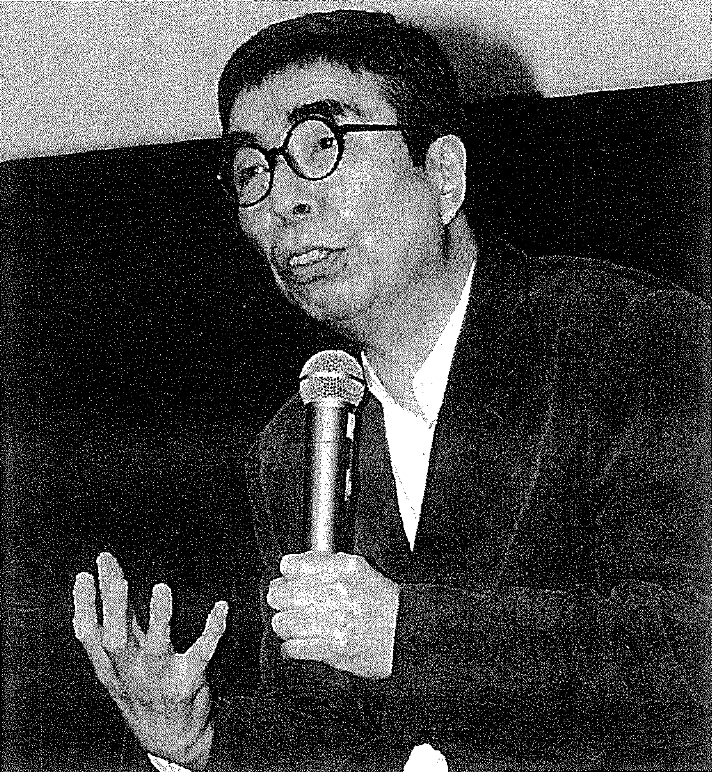
- Inoue in 2008
- Born: 16 November 1934; Kawanishi, Yamagata, Japan
- Died: 9 April 2010 (aged 75); Kamakura, Kanagawa, Japan
- Occupation: Writer
- Writing career
- Genres: Novels, stage plays

Hisashi Inoue (井上 ひさし, Inoue Hisashi; 16 November 1934 – 9 April 2010) was a Japanese playwright and writer of comic fiction. From 1961 to 1986, he used the pen name of Hisashi Uchiyama.

== Early life ==
Inoue was born in what is now part of Kawanishi in Yamagata Prefecture, where his father was a pharmacist. His father was involved in an agrarian reform movement and also managed a local drama troupe. A novel his father had written won a prize and he was offered a job as a scriptwriter in a film company. But when he was preparing to move to Tokyo, he became ill with spinal caries and, soon after, when Hisashi Inoue was 5 years old, he died at age 34. His father's sudden death influenced Hisashi to be a writer. After suffering from child abuse at the hands of his stepfather, he was subsequently sent off to a Lasallian orphanage in Sendai, where he received a Christian baptism. He graduated from Sophia University’s Facility of Letters, continuing on to graduate school in French literature, with a two-year hiatus in between to raise more money for his studies by working at a sanatorium in Kamaishi, Iwate.

World War II ended when Inoue was just 11 years old. The experience of war helped shape Inoue’s own writing style, and fostered an anti-war perspective.

== Literary career ==
Even before graduation, Inoue began his literary career by working as a stage manager and writing scripts for the Furansu-za striptease theater in Asakusa, Tokyo. It was common to have a one-hour vaudeville performance before and between strip acts, and many famous actors, including Kiyoshi Atsumi started their careers in such an environment. He wrote a semi-fictional account of his life during this period in Mokkinpotto Shi no Atoshimatsu ("The Fortunes of Father Mockinpott"). After graduation, he obtained a position as a script writer for a puppet drama Hyokkori Hyotanjima, which aired from April 1964 for a five-year period.

After an initial career in radio, he wrote his first stage play Nihonjin no Heso in 1969 for Theatre Echo. He first gained literary recognition for his satirical comic plays in the tradition of the Edo period gesaku genre. Inoue has won a very large number of literary awards in the course of his career, including the 67th Naoki Prize in 1972 for his novel Tegusari Shinju ("Handcuffed Double Suicide"). He followed on this success in 1981 with Kirikirijin ("The People of Kirikiri"), which was inspired by Leicester Hemingway's New Atlantis and was awarded both the Yomiuri Literary Prize and the 2nd Japan Science Fiction Award.

In 1983, Inoue established his own theatre troupe called "Komatsuza" to perform his own plays. Komatsuza gave its debut in 1984 with a play on writer Ichiyō Higuchi, Zutsuu katakori Higuchi Ichiyō. Another biographical work centered on Meiji period writer Ishikawa Takuboku, whom together with Higuchi Inoue had long admired. His 2002 play Taiko tataite, fue fuite, based on the late years of writer Fumiko Hayashi, received the Tsuruya Nanboku Drama Award.

In 1988, he completed a comic trilogy: Kirameku seiza, Yami ni saku hana, Yuki ya kon kon, depicting the lives of ordinary people in the Shōwa period. Despite his activity with the theatre, Inoue continued to write novels, winning the 1982 Seiun Award for Best Novel for Kirikirijin, the Yoshikawa Eiji Literary Prize for Treasury of Disloyal Retainers in 1986, the 27th Tanizaki Prize for Shanghai Moon in 1991, and the Kikuchi Kan Prize for Tokyo Seven Roses in 1999. In 1984, the Writer's Block Library was opened in Kawanishi, Yamagata, thanks to Inoue's donation of his 100,000 volume book collection. Inoue was awarded the Asahi Prize in the year 2000 and the Yomiuri Literary Prize again in 2010. In 2004, he was designated a Person of Cultural Merit by the Japanese government.

His career delves into the genre of science fiction. He started radio broadcasting with the play X-Man (1960). He also wrote for the daily children's television show Hyokkori Hyōtanjima ["Madcap Island"] (1964), which was a puppet show in which a volcanic eruption destroyed a whole community adrift. There were hints of adult and dark humor in the children's show.

Inoue's career was long and distinguished. He didn't only work as a writer, he also produced and wrote anime as a writer and lyricist. He created the theme songs for Himitsu no Akko-chan, Hans Christian Andersen Stories and Moomin (1969). He is also known for writing the lyrics and screenplay for The Wonderful World of Puss 'n Boots (1969).

Chichi to kuraseba, has been translated into the English by Roger Pulvers under the title The Face of Jizo.

== Style ==
Inoue had shown a self-reflective attitude about the war. His perspectives came from his early life. When he was young, he thought that he would die due to the war. However, the war was ended with the use of the atomic bomb, and it offered him a new chance to see the world. His experience during the war also made him see himself as just one man who alone who didn't have the power to create change.

In reflecting on Japan's experience during the war, he has written, "When I bring up the subject of Hiroshima and Nagasaki, an increasing number of people say, ‘It is wrong to dwell on having been victimized, because the Japanese of those days also victimized Asia.’ The second part of this view is certainly accurate. The Japanese did victimize all of Asia. However, I will never accept this first statement because I believe that the two atomic bombs were not merely dropped on the Japanese; they were dropped on the entire human existence . …modern world who cannot escape from the existence of nuclear weapons."

When compared with other modern Japanese writers, he shows a stronger influence of Japanese culture, particularly popular culture. His writing is for Japanese people, and his plays were usually have strong influenced from Japanese culture. In turn, he has influenced Japanese broadcast systems and his influence could be easily found in the Japanese modern theatre culture, other drama, and Japanese shows. He is also famous for using high quality Japanese words in his writing. As a result, translators find it hard to translate his plays and other writing. However, because of his play was influenced by Japanese culture a lot, it would be hard to translate it into different cultures, but his writing is considered to be helpful to understand a Japanese perspective. Inoue's novel Kirikirijin (Kirikiri People, 1981) shows Inoue's sharp humor and word play.

Inoue became famous as comedy writer. In his early literary career, he worked as broadcast writer and comedy writer in strip show. These early literary career influence him to be comedy writer. His suffered young life from the death of his father and World War II also influenced him to have interest about the life of ordinary people.

Inoue had warm and kind perspectives about poor or weak people, and it is shown in his plays. His play tries to give hope and show the kind side of society. His writing was based on Humanism, and this likely accounts for his popularity with the public. He also usually focused on showing how ordinary people's lives were destroyed by war or calamity and how they cured themselves.

== Personal life ==
Inoue lived in Ichikawa, Chiba in the 1970s, and moved to Kamakura, Kanagawa from 1989, where he lived until his death. He had three daughters by his first wife, Yoshiko Nishidate, who was a stage actress and political activist. His second wife, Lily, was the sister of essayist and translator Mari Yonehara, and the daughter of Arika Yonehara, a senior member of the Japan Communist Party. Together they had a son.

Inoue hated air travel, but was fascinated by the city of Bologna in Italy, which he visited in 2004. He had previously visited Australia in 1976, and had also visited New York City in the 1980s for discussion about a possible Broadway version of a story of Miyamoto Musashi he was planning to write.

Inoue served as president of the Japan P.E.N. Club from 2003 to 2007. He was also director of the Japan Association of Playwrights, and director of the Institute of Japanese Literature. An outspoken pacifist, Inoue established a political group in support of the Constitution of Japan with Kenzaburō Ōe in 2004.

A heavy smoker, Inoue was diagnosed with lung cancer in October 2009 and died at his home on 9 April 2010 at the age of 75.

== Selected works ==
=== Scripts ===
- Ame (雨), 1976.
- Buraun kangoku no shiki (ブラウン 監獄 の 四季), Tōkyō : Kōdansha, 1977.
- Jūninin no tegami (十二人 の 手紙), Tōkyō : Chūō Kōronsha, 1978.
- Tanin no chi (他人 の 血), Tōkyō : Kōdansha, 1979.
- Seibo no dōkeshi (聖母 の 道化師), 1981.
- Shikaban Nihongo bunpō (私家版 日本語 文法), Tokyo : Shinchōsha, 1981.
- Hon no makura no sōshi (本 の 枕 草子), Tōkyō : Bungei Shunjū, 1982.
- Kotoba o yomu (ことば を 読む), Tōkyō : Chūō Kōronsha, 1982.
- Shichinin no sakkatachi : intabyū-shū (七人 の 作家たち : インタビュー集), Tōkyō : Doyō Bijutsusha, 1983.
- Moto no mokuami (もと の 黙阿弥), Tōkyō : Bungei Shunjū, 1983.
- Nippon hakubutsushi (にっぽん 博物誌), Tōkyō : Asahi Shinbunsha, 1983.
- Inoue Hisashi zen shibai (井上 ひさし 全 芝居), Tōkyō : Shinchōsha, 1984.
- Jikasei bunshō-dokuhon (自家製 文章読本), Tōkyō : Shinchōsha, 1984.
- Fu Chūshingura (不 忠臣蔵), Tōkyō : Shūeisha, 1985.
- Kuni yutaka ni shite gi o wasure (国 ゆたか に して 義 を 忘れ), Tōkyō : Kadokawa Shoten, 1985.
- Fukkoki (腹鼓記), Tōkyō : Shinchōsha, 1985.
- Yonsenmanpo no otoko. Ezo hen (四千万步 の 男. 蝦夷 篇 ), Tōkyō : Kōdansha, 1986.
- Yonsenmanpo no otoko. Izu hen (四千万步 の 男. 伊豆 篇 ), Tōkyō : Kōdansha, 1989.
- Shanhai mūn (シャンハイ ムーン), Tōkyō : Shūeisha, 1991.
- Nihongo nikki (ニホン語 日記), Tōkyō : Bungei shunjū, 1993.
- Chichi to kuraseba (父と暮せば), Tōkyō: Shinchōsha, 1994.
- Besuto serā no sengoshi (ベスト セラー の 戦後史), Tōkyō : Bungei Shunjū, 1995.
- Hon no unmei (本 の 運命), Tōkyō : Bungei Shunjū, 1997.
- Yonsenmanpo no otoko, Chūkei no ikikata (四千万步 の 男・忠敬 の 生き方), Tōkyō : Kōdansha, 2003.
- Little Boy, Big Taifoon (リトル・ボーイ、ビッグ・タイフーン～少年口伝隊一九四五～), 2008.

=== Books ===
- Kirikirijin (Shinchosha, 1981, Japan SF Grand Prize, Yomiuri Prize for Literature)
- Yonsenmanpo no otoko (Kodansha, 1986–90, five volumes)
- Tokyo sebun rōzu (Bungeishunju, 1999, Kikuchi Kan Prize)
