= Yoshihama Station (Iwate) =

Railway station in Ōfunato, Iwate Prefecture, Japan

Yoshihama Station 吉浜駅
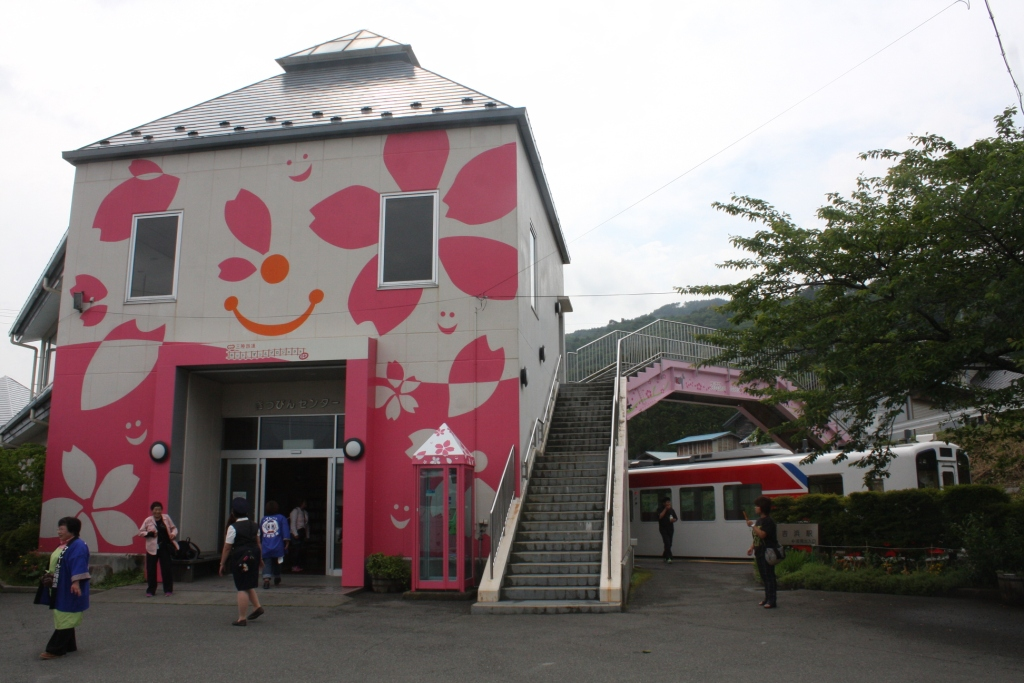
- Yoshihama Station in June 2013

General information
- Location: Sanriku-cho Yoshihama, Ōfunato-shi, Iwate-ken 022-0102; Japan
- Coordinates: 39°09′4″N 141°50′10.9″E
- Operator: Sanriku Railway
- Line: ■ Rias Line
- Distance: 21.6 km from Sakari
- Platforms: 1 side platform
- Tracks: 1

Construction
- Structure type: At grade

Other information
- Status: Unstaffed
- Website: Official website

History
- Opened: 1 July 1973
- Former names: 15
Location
- Location within Japan

Yoshihama Station (吉浜駅, Yoshihama-eki) is a railway station on the Sanriku Railway Company’s Rias Line located in the city of Ōfunato, Iwate Prefecture, Japan. It is 21.6 rail kilometers from the terminus of the line at Sakari Station.

== Station layout ==
Yoshihama Station has a single side platform serving a single bi-directional track. The station is unattended.

== History ==
Yoshihama Station opened on 1 July 1973 as a station on the Japan National Railway (JNR). It was privatized on 1 April 1984, becoming a station on the Sanriku Railway. During the 11 March 2011 Tōhoku earthquake and tsunami, part of the tracks on the Minami-Rias Line were swept away, thus suspending services. The line resumed operations on 3 April 2013 between Sakari and Yoshihama. Services between Yoshihama and Kamaishi resumed on 5 April 2014. Minami-Rias Line, a portion of Yamada Line, and Kita-Rias Line constitute Rias Line on 23 March 2019. Accordingly, this station became an intermediate station of Rias Line.

== Adjacent stations ==
←	Service	→
Sanriku Railway Company
Sanriku	Local	Tōni

== Surrounding area ==
- Yoshihama Elementary School
- Yoshihama Middle School
- Yoshihama Post Office
- Japan National Route 45

== See also ==
- List of railway stations in Japan
