= Kazuo Kuroki =

Japanese film director

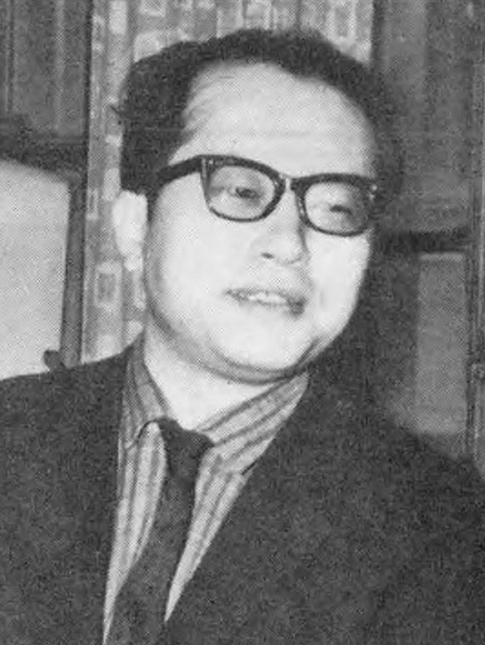
- Kazuo Kuroki in 1965
- Born: 10 November 1930; Matsuzaka, Mie
- Died: 12 April 2006 (aged 75); Tokyo
- Occupation: Film director

Kazuo Kuroki (黒木和雄, Kuroki Kazuo) was a Japanese film director who was particularly known for his films on World War II and the question of personal guilt.

== Career ==
While Kuroki was often listed as being born in Miyazaki Prefecture, he was actually born in Matsusaka, Mie. He attended Doshisha University, but left before graduating, instead finding employment at Iwanami Productions (Iwanami Eiga). There he directed PR films and documentary films, while also participating in the "Blue Group" (Ao no kai) with other Iwanami filmmakers such as Noriaki Tsuchimoto, Shinsuke Ogawa, and Yōichi Higashi, a group that was exploring new paths in documentary. Kuroki left Iwanami after experiencing conflicts with the sponsors of his Hokkaido, My Love (1960), and it was his Record of a Marathon Runner (1964) that helped spark changes in the Japanese documentary world.

Kuroki switched to fiction film, independently producing Silence Has No Wings (1966) and showing it at the Art Theatre Guild. He became one of the representative figures of ATG and independent Japanese cinema, and was particularly known for a series of works dealing with the atomic bombings of Japan, such as Tomorrow (1988) and The Face of Jizo (2004). These were in part spurred by his growing up near the city of Nagasaki. Kuroki's work also dealt with his own feelings of guilt from the war, as he felt responsible when some of his fellow students, who had been conscripted to work in a local factory, died in Allied bombings and he did not help.

== Awards ==
Kuroki won the best director award at the 2004 Mainichi Film Awards for The Face of Jizo and Utsukushii natsu Kirishima (2004).

== Selected filmography ==
- Hokkaido, My Love (1960)
- Record of a Marathon Runner (1964)
- Silence Has No Wings (1966)
- Cuban Lover (1969)
- Evil Spirits of Japan (1970)
- Ryoma Ansatsu (1975)
- Preparation for the Festival (1975)
- Yūgure made (1980)
- The Bridge of Tears (1983)
- Tomorrow (1988)
- Rōnin-gai (1990)
- Pickpocket (2000)
- A Boy's Summer in 1945 (2002)
- The Face of Jizo (2004)
- The Blossoming of Kamiya Etsuko (2006)
