= Sachio Sakai =

Japanese actor (1925–1998)

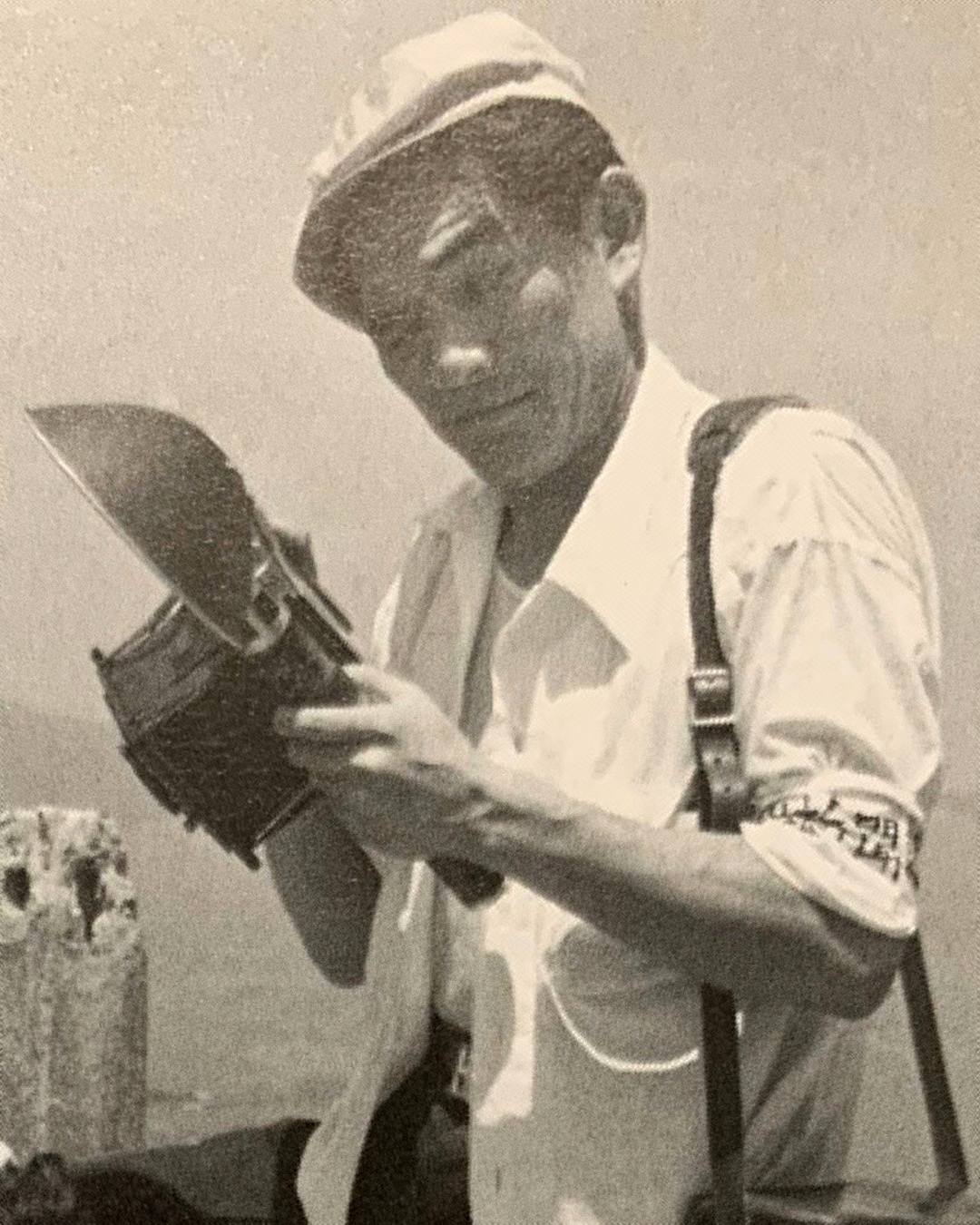
- Sakai on the set of Godzilla.
- Born: Yukio Abe; 8 September 1925; Tokyo, Japan
- Died: 11 March 1998 (aged 72)
- Occupation: Actor
- Years active: 1947–1994

Sachio Sakai (堺 左千夫, Sakai Sachio; 8 September 1925 – 11 March 1998), born Yukio Abe (阿部 幸男, Abe Yukio), was a Japanese actor. In 1947, he made his film debut with Akira Kurosawa's One Wonderful Sunday. He often worked with Akira Kurosawa and Kihachi Okamoto.

== Filmography ==
=== Films ===
- One Wonderful Sunday (1947) as Ticket seller
- Drunken Angel (1948) as Guitarist
- Stray Dog (1949) as Spectator of theater
- Aoi sanmyaku (1949)
- Bōryoku no Machi (1950)
- Aoi Shinju (1951) as Yanagiya
- Vendetta for a Samurai (1952)
- Nangoku no hada (1952)
- The Man Who Came to Port (1952)
- Ikiru (1952) as Gang
- Eagle of the Pacific (1953)
- Seven Samurai (1954) as a coolie
- Godzilla (1954) as Hagiwara
- Half Human (1955) as Nakata
- Samurai II: Duel at Ichijoji Temple (1955) as Matahachi Honiden
- Throne of Blood (1957) as Washizu's vassal
- Song for a Bride (1958) as Kurokawa
- The Hidden Fortress (1958) as Ashigaru
- Life of an Expert Swordsman (1959)
- The Secret of the Telegian (1960) as Taki
- Storm Over the Pacific (1960)
- The Story of Osaka Castle (1961) as Kai Hayami
- Yojimbo (1961) as Ashigaru
- Sanjuro (1961) as Ashigaru
- Gorath (1962) as Physician
- King Kong vs. Godzilla (1962) as Obayashi, Mr. Tako's Assistant
- King Kong Escapes (1967) as Kazuo Suzuki (Dr. Who's Henchmen)
- Japan's Longest Day (1967)
- All Monsters Attack (1969) as Kobayashi
- Samurai Banners (1969) as Yamagata Masakage
- Red Lion (1969) as Kesagi
- The Vampire Doll (1970) as Taxi driver
- Space Amoeba (1970) as the magazine editor
- Battle of Okinawa (1971)
- The Human Revolution (1973)
- Lupin III: Strange Psychokinetic Strategy (1974) as Security chief
- Blue Christmas (1978) as Taxi driver
- Zatoichi (1989)
- Dreams (1990)
- Rhapsody in August (1991)

=== Television ===
- Daichūshingura (1971) as Wasuke
- Hissatsu Shikakenin (1972) (ep.24) as Shinbei Tajima
- Hissatsu Shiokinin (1973) (ep.15) as Yasuke
- Shinsho Taikōki (1973) as Matsunaga Hisahide
- Taiyō ni Hoero! (1974) (ep.126) as Urabayashi
- Tasukenin Hashiru (1974) (ep.35) as Gunpei
- Kurayami Shitomenin (1975) (ep.26) as Matsugoro
- Hissatsu Shiokiya Kagyō (1975) (ep.6) as Kisuke
- Hissatsu Shiwazanin (1975) (ep.28) as Sanji
- Daitsuiseki (1978) (ep.8)
- Edo Professional Hissatsu Shōbainin (1978) (ep.10) as Tenmanya
- The Fierce Battles of Edo (1979) (ep.8) as Kamekichi
- Hissatsu Shigotonin (1982) (ep.10) as Matsug
- Hissatsu Shigotonin III (1980) (ep.45) as Rihei
- Onihei Hankachō (1990) (ep.22) as Kaneya Iemon
