= Mari Shiraki =

Japanese actress (1937–2023)

- 白木 万理
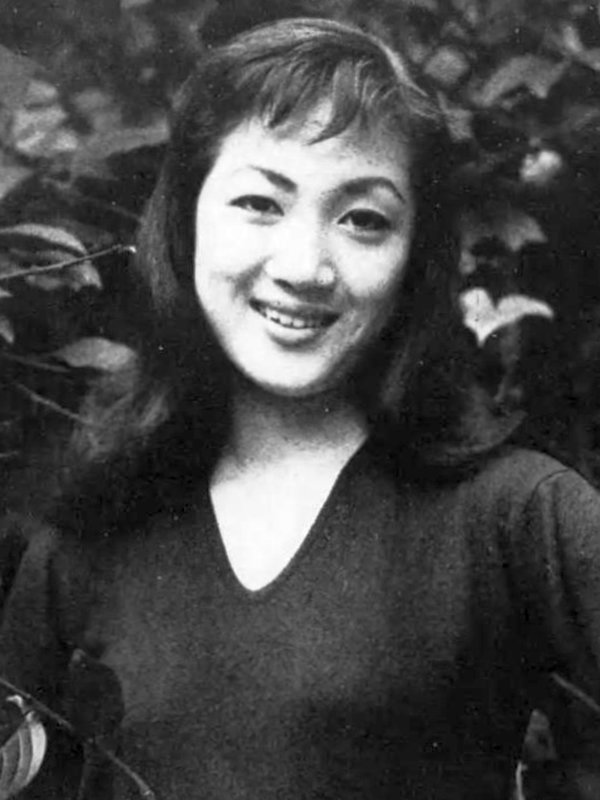
- Shiraki in 1957
- Born: 22 February 1937; Tokyo, Japan
- Died: 12 July 2023 (aged 86)
- Occupation: Actor
- Years active: 1957–2023

Mari Shiraki (白木 万理, Shiraki Mari; 22 February 1937 – 12 July 2023) was a Japanese actress. She joined the Nikkatsu studio and appeared in about 100 films at Nikkatsu. Shiraki is well known for her role of Ritsu Nakamura on the jidaigeki television series Hissatsu.

Shiraki died on 12 July 2023, at the age of 86. Her death was reported three years later, in September 2026.

== Selected filmography ==
=== Film ===
- The Naked Woman and the Gun (1957)
- Man Who Causes a Storm (1957)
- Underworld Beauty (1958)
- Rusty Knife (1958)
- Yoru no kiba (1958)
- Subarashiki dansei (1958)
- Arashi no naka o tsuppashire (1958)
- Take Aim at the Police Van (1960)
- Kenju burai-chō Denkō Setsuka no Otoko (1960)
- Kurenai no Kenju (1961)
- Tokyo Drifter 2: The Sea is Bright Red as the Color of Love (1966)
- Stray Cat Rock: Wild Jumbo (1970)
- Kage Gari Hoero taiho (1972)
- Hissatsu: Sure Death (1984)
- Hissatsu! III Ura ka Omote ka (1986)
- Sure Death 4: Revenge (1987)
- Hissatsu!5 Ōgon no Chi (1991)
- Hissatsu! Mondo Shisu (1996)

=== Television ===
==== Hissatsu series ====
- Ōedo Sōsamō (1970–84), Koharu
- Hissatsu Shiokinin (1973) as Ritsu Nakamura
- Kurayami Shitomenin (1974)
- Hissatsu Shiokiya Kagyō (1975)
- Hissatsu Shiwazanin (1976)
- Shin Hissatsu Shiokinin (1977)
- Edo Professional Hissatsu Shōbainin (1978)
- Hissatsu Shigotonin (1979–81)
- Shin Hissatsu Shigotonin (1981–82)
- Hissatsu Shigotonin III (1982–83)
- Hissatsu Shigotonin IV (1984)
- Hissatsu Shigotonin V (1985)
- Hissatsu Shigotonin V Gekitouhen (1985–86)
- Hissatsu Shigotonin V Senpuhen (1986–87)
- Hissatsu Shigotonin V Fuunryūkohen (1987)
- Hissatsu Shigotonin Gekitotsu (1991–92)
- Hissatsu Shigotonin 2009 (2009)
