= Rinichi Yamamoto =

Japanese actor

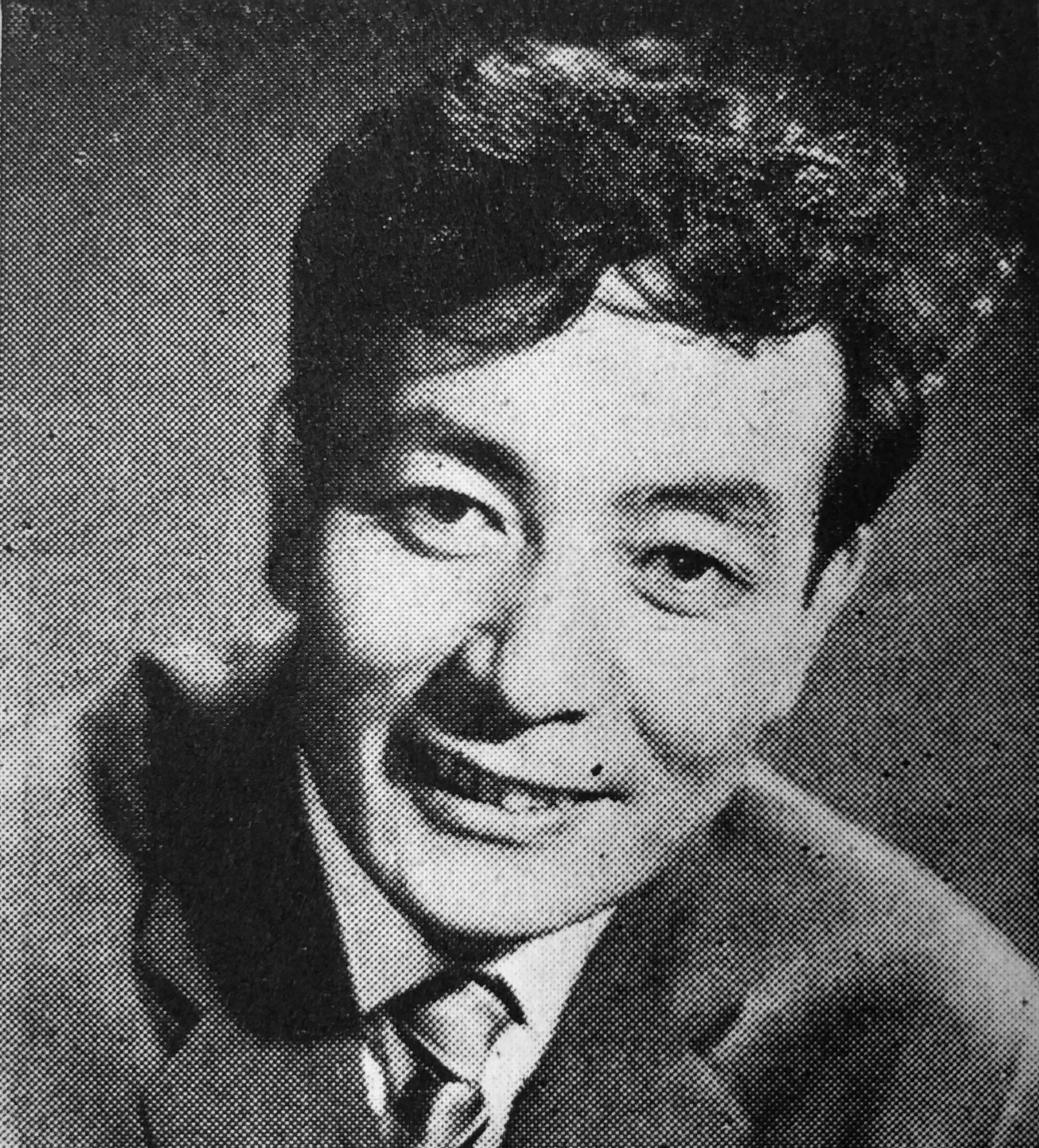
- Rinichi Yamamoto
- Born: January 16, 1927; Asahikawa, Hokkaido Japan
- Died: October 17, 1980 (aged 53)
- Occupation: Actor
- Years active: 1953-80

Rinichi Yamamoto (山本 麟一, Yamamoto Rin'ichi) was a Japanese actor from Hokkaido.

In 1953, he signed to the Toei Company and made his film debut in Gakusei Goninotoko. He is most famous for playing villains, and appeared more than 200 films. He also had many guest appearances as a villain in television dramas. His final role was Yoshinaka in the 1980 miniseries Shōgun.

== Selected filmography ==
=== Film ===
- Planet Prince (1959)
- The Mad Fox (1962)
- League of Gangsters (1963) as Kusunoki
- A Fugitive from the Past (1965) as Monk
- The Valiant Red Peony (1968)
- Onna Gokuakuchō (1970) as Akaza Matajūrō
- Battles Without Honor and Humanity: Proxy War (1973)
- Lady Snowblood (1973) as Maruyama
- The Street Fighter (1974)
- Lupin III: Strange Psychokinetic Strategy (1974)
- The Return of the Sister Street Fighter (1975) as Wang Long-Ming
- New Battles Without Honor and Humanity: Last Days of the Boss (1975) as Kurihara
- Karate Kiba (1976)
- Empire of Passion (1978)
- Bandits vs. Samurai Squadron (1978)
- Nichiren (1979) as Ichi Shigenao
- Barefoot Gen Part 3: Battle of Hiroshima (1980) as Okauchi
- Shōgun (1980) as Yoshinaka

=== Television ===
- Regular
  - Seven Color Mask (1959)
  - Ten to Chito (1969 Taiga drama) as Matano
  - Shin Heike Monogatari (1972 Taiga drama) as Jitsusōbō
- Guest
  - Key Hunter episodes 25 & 50
  - Kogarashi Monjirō (1972) episode 6
  - Nemuri Kyōshirō (1973) episode 26
  - Taiyō ni Hoero! episodes 26 & 162
  - Hissatsu Shiokinin episode 26
  - Tasukenin Hashiru episode 28
  - Kurayami Shitomenin episode 5
  - Hissatsu Shiokiya Kagyō episode 26
  - Shin Hissatsu Shiokinin episode 2
  - Edo Professional Hissatsu Shōbainin episode 26
  - Oshizamurai Kiichihōgan episode 7
  - Nagasaki Hangachōu episode 5
  - Daitsuiseki episodes 17 & 25
  - G-Men '75 episodes 185 & 186
  - Tantei Monogatari
