= Hissatsu series =

Japanese television series

The Hissatsu series (必殺シリーズ, Hissatsu series) is a long-running prime-time popular television Jidaigeki series about assassins in Japan, produced by ABC Television and Shochiku. Hissatsu Shikakenin is based on Shōtarō Ikenami's novel Shikakenin Fujieda Baian, but its sequels are only inspired by it. The series still continues as an annual two-hour special drama.

== List of TV series ==
#	Romanised Name	Start	End	Starring	Supporting cast	Additional Notes
1	Hissatsu Shikakenin	2 September 1972	14 April 1973	Yoichi Hayashi; Ken Ogata	So Yamamura; Tamao Nakamura	
2	Hissatsu Shiokinin	21 April 1972	13 October 1973	Tsutomu Yamazaki	Makoto Fujita; Masaya Oki; Yumiko Nogawa	
3	Tasukenin Hashiru	20 October 1973	22 June 1974	Takahiro Tamura	Ichirō Nakatani; So Yamamura; Hiroshi Miyauchi	
4	Kurayami Shitomenin	29 June 1974	28 December 1974	Koji Ishizaka	Makoto Fujita; Yosuke Kondō; Yumiko Nogawa	
5	Hissatsu Hitchū Shigotoya Kagyō	4 April 1975	27 June 1975	Ken Ogata	Ryuzo Hayashi; Mitsuko Kusabue	
6	Hissatsu Shiokiya Kagyō	4 July 1975	9 January 1976	Masaya Oki	Makoto Fujita; Katsutoshi Arata; Tamao Nakamura	
7	Hissatsu Shiwazanin	16 January 1976	23 July 1976	Atsuo Nakamura	Makoto Fujita; Shun Ode; Mie Nakao	
8	Hissatsu Karakurinin	30 July 1976	22 October 1976	Ken Ogata	Isuzu Yamada; Judy Ongg; Kensaku Morita	
9	Hissatsu Karakurinin Keppūhen	29 October 1976	14 January 1977	Tsutomu Yamazaki	Mitsuko Kusabue; Peter; Kenkichi Hamaike	
10	Shin Hissatsu Shiokinin	21 January 1977	4 November 1977	Makoto Fujita	Tsutomu Yamazaki; Katsuo Nakamura; Fumio Fujimura	
11	Shin Hissatsu Karakurinin	18 November 1977	2 February 1977	Masaomi Kondō	Isuzu Yamada; Gannosuke Ashiya; Ken Ogata	
12	Edo Professional Hissatsu Shōbainin	17 February 1978	18 August 1978	Makoto Fujita	Tatsuo Umemiya; Mitsuko Kusabue; Shōhei Hino	
13	Hissatsu Karakurinin Fugakuhyakkei Koroshitabi	25 August 1978	24 November 1978	Masaya Oki	Isuzu Yamada; Gannosuke Ashiya	
14	Tobe Hissatsu Uragoroshi	8 December 1978	11 May 1978	Atsuo Nakamura	Etsuko Ichihara; Akiko Wada; Shōhei Hino	
15	Hissatsu Shigotonin	18 May 1979	30 January 1981	Makoto Fujita	Kunihiko Mitamura; Goro Ibuki; Isuzu Yamada	
16	Hissatsu Shimainin			Machiko Kyō	Etsushi Takahashi; Hirotarō Honda	
17	Shin Hissatsu Shigotonin	1981	1982	Makoto Fujita	Kunihiko Mitamura; Kiyoshi Nakajō; Isuzu Yamada	
18	Hissatsu Shimainin	1981	1981	Machiko Kyō	Etsushi Takahashi; Hirotarō Honda	
19	Hissatsu Shigotonin III	1982	1983	Makoto Fujita	Kunihiko Mitamura; Kiyoshi Nakajō; Isuzu Yamada	
20	Hissatsu Watashinin	1983	1983	Masatoshi Nakamura	Mieko Takamine; Atsushi Watanabe	
21	Hissatsu Shigotonin IV	1983	1984	Makoto Fujita	Kunihiko Mitamura; Kiyoshi Nakajō; Isuzu Yamada	
22	Hissatsu Shikirinin	1984	1984	Kiyoshi Nakajō	Gannosuke Ashiya; Akira Onodera; Machiko Kyō	
23	Hissatsu Shigotonin V	1985	1985	Makoto Fujita	Hiroaki Murakami; Masaki Kyomoto; Isuzu Yamada	
24	Hissastu Hashikakenin	1985	1985	Masahiko Tsugawa	Shin Takuma; Hisako Manda	
25	Hissatsu Shigotonin V Gekitouhen	1986	1986	Makoto Fujita	Masaki Kyomoto; Hiroaki Murakami	
26	Hissatsu Masshigura!	1986	1986	Kunihiko Mitamura	Teruhiko Saigo; Yoko Akino	
27	Hissatsu Shigotonin V Senpuhen	1986	1987	Makoto Fujita	Hiroaki Murakami; Kin Sugai	
28	Hissatsu Shigotonin V Fuunryūkohen	1987	1987	Makoto Fujita	Hiroaki Murakami; Tomokazu Miura	
29	Hissatsu Kengekinin	1987	1987	Masaomi Kondō; Teruhiko Aoi; Ken Tanaka		
30	Hissatsu Shigotonin Gekitotsu	1991	1992	Makoto Fujita	Kunihiko Mitamura; Sakae Takita; Yuki Meguro	
31	Hissatsu Shigotonin 2009	2009	2009	Noriyuki Higashiyama	Makoto Fujita; Masahiro Matsuoka; Emi Wakui	

== List of TV special dramas ==
- Tokubetsuhen Hissatsu Shigotonin Kyofuno Ooshigoto Mito Owari Kishu (1981)
- Hissatsu series Jutsushunen Kinen specialShigotonin Daishūgoū (1982)
- Hissatsu Gendaiban Mondo no shison ga Kyotoni Arawareta (1982)
- Toshiwasure Hissatsu Special Shigotonin Ahensenso e Yuku (1983)
- Hissatsu Shigotonin Igaiden Mondo Dainana Kiheitaito Tatakau (1985)
- Shinshun Shigotonin Special HissatsuChoushingura (1987)
- Hissatsu Shigotonin waido Tairo Goroshi (1987)
- Hissatsu wide shinshun Hisashiburi Mondo Yume no Hatsushigoto Akunin Check! (1988)
- Hissatsu special Haru Yonimo Fushigina Ooshigoto (1991)
- Hissatsu special Shinshun Sen Ritsu Youkai sareru Mondo Dosuru? (1992)
- Hissatsu Shigotonin 2007
- Hissatsu Shigotonin 2010
- Hissatsu Shigotonin 2012
- Hissatsu Shigotonin 2013
- Hissatsu Shigotonin 2014
- Hissatsu Shigotonin 2015
- Hissatsu Shigotonin 2016
- Hissatsu Shigotonin 2018
- Hissatsu Shigotonin 2019
- Hissatsu Shigotonin 2020
- Hissatsu Shigotonin 2022
- Hissatsu Shigotonin 2023
- Hissatsu Shigotonin (2023)

== List of films ==
- Hissatsu Shikakenin (1973)
- Hissatsu Shikakenin Baian Arijigoku (1973)
- Hissatsu Shikakenin Shunsetsu shikakebari (1974)
- Hissatsu: Sure Death (1984)
- Hissatsu! Braunkan no Kaibutsutachi (1985)
- Hissatsu! III Ura ka Omote ka (1986), directed by Eiichi Kudo
- Sure Death 4: Revenge (1987), directed by Kinji Fukasaku
- Hissatsu! 5: Ōgon no Chi (1991), directed by Toshio Masuda
- Hissatsu! Mondo Shisu (1996)
- Hissatsu Shimatsunin (1998)
- Hissatsu! Shamisenya no Yuji (1999)
