= Hissatsu Karakurinin Fugakuhyakkei Koroshitabi =

1978 Japanese television period drama

- Also known as: 必殺からくり人・富嶽百景殺し旅
- Genre: Jidaigeki
- Directed by: Eiichi Kudo; Kazuo Kuroki
- Starring: Masaya Oki; Isuzu Yamada; Eitaro Ozawa; Hideko Yoshida; Kimie Shingyoji
- Country of origin: Japan
- Original language: Japanese
- No. of episodes: 14

Production
- Producers: Hisashi Yamauchi; Rikyū Nakagawa
- Running time: 45 minutes (per episode)
- Production companies: Asahi Broadcasting Corporation; Shochiku

Original release
- Network: ANN (ABC, TV Asahi)
- Release: 1978 – 1978

Hissatsu Karakurinin Fugakuhyakkei Koroshitabi (必殺からくり人・富嶽百景殺し旅) is a Japanese television jidaigeki or period drama that was broadcast in 1978. It is the 13th in the Hissatsu series, and was inspired by Hokusai's One Hundred Views of Mount Fuji. The lead star is Masaya Oki. Eitaro Ozawa played Hokusai.

== Cast ==
- Masaya Oki as Tōjurō
- Isuzu Yamada as Oen
- Gannosuke Ashiya
- Kimie Shingyoji as Usagi
- Hideko Yoshida
- Eiji Okada
- Eitaro Ozawa as Hokusai

== See also ==
- Hissatsu Shikakenin (first in the Hissatsu series)
- Hissatsu Shiokinin (second in the Hissatsu series)
- Shin Hissatsu Shiokinin (tenth in the Hissatsu series)
