= Hissatsu! 5: Ōgon no Chi =

1991 film directed by Toshio Masuda

Hissatsu! 5 Ōgon no Chi
- Film poster
- Directed by: Toshio Masuda
- Written by: Tsuyoshi Yoshida
- Starring: Makoto Fujita; Kunihiko Mitamura; Hiroaki Murakami; Yoko Yamamoto
- Music by: Masaaki Hirao
- Production company: Shôchiku Eiga
- Release date: November 23, 1991 (Japan)
- Running time: 104 minutes
- Country: Japan
- Language: Japanese

Hissatsu! 5: Ōgon no Chi (Japanese: 必殺!5 黄金の血), also known as Sure Death 5, is a 1991 Japanese film based on the jidaigeki Hissatsu Shigotonin television series. The film is an occasionally whimsical drama about assassins. The film was directed by Toshio Masuda.

== Cast ==
- Makoto Fujita as Mondo Nakamura
- Kunihiko Mitamura as Hide
- Hiroaki Murakami as Masa
- Yasuko Mitsumoto as Outa
- Youichi Yamamoto as Yumeji
- Kin Sugai as Sen Nakamura
- Mari Shiraki as Ritsu Nakamura
- Megumi Asaoka as Sada
- Noriko Sakai as Oasa
- Ittoku Kishibe
- Yoko Yamamoto as Goto Chitose
