= Hissatsu Shiwazanin =

- Also known as: 必殺仕業人
- Genre: Jidaigeki
- Directed by: Eiichi Kudo; Koreyoshi Kurahara
- Starring: Makoto Fujita; Atsuo Nakamura; Kin Sugai; Mie Nakao; Shun Ōide; Atsushi Watanabe
- Country of origin: Japan
- Original language: Japanese
- No. of episodes: 28

Production
- Producers: Hisashi Yamauchi; Rikyū Nakagawa
- Running time: 45 minutes (per episode)
- Production companies: Asahi Broadcasting Corporation; Shochiku

Original release
- Network: ANN (ABC, NET)
- Release: 1976 – 1976

Hissatsu Shiwazanin (必殺仕業人) is a Japanese television jidaigeki or period drama that was broadcast in prime-time in 1976. It is 7th in the Hissatsu series. The drama is sequel to Hissatsu Shiokiya Kagyō.

== Cast ==
- Atsuo Nakamura : Akai Kennosuke
- Makoto Fujita : Mondo Nakamura
- Shun Ōide: Yaitoya Mataemon
- Mie Nakao : Ote
- Atsushi Watanabe : Sutezō
- Kin Sugai : Sen Nakamura
- Mari Shiraki : Ritsu Nakamura
