= Jūkei Fujioka =

Japanese actor and seiyū

- Born: 19 November 1933; Kobe, Hyōgo Prefecture, Japan
- Died: 23 July 1991 (aged 57)
- Occupation: Actor
- Years active: 1955–1991

Jūkei Fujioka (藤岡 重慶, Fujioka Jūkei; 19 November 1933 – 23 July 1991) was a Japanese actor. He is known as an actor who often played villains, but is famous for playing the role of detective Daisaku Tani in the detective drama Seibu Keisatsu.

Fujioka started his acting career at the Haiyuza Theatre Company. His film debut was in the 1961 film A New Wind Over the Mountain Pass directed by Seijun Suzuki. Following year, he signed his contract with Nikkatsu film company.

In May 1991, while performing at the New Kabukiza in Osaka, he complained of poor health and was hospitalized at Kitasato University East Hospital in Sagamihara City, Kanagawa Prefecture. At 7:06 a.m. on July 23 of the same year, he died due to intracerebral hemorrhage (died at the age of 57).

== Filmography ==
=== Films ===
- A New Wind Over the Mountain Pass (1961)
- The Long Death (1964) as Oda
- Story of a Prostitute (1965) as Kimura
- Abare Kishidō (1965) as Shimizu
- Man Who Causes a Storm (1966) as Mochinaga
- Massacre Gun (1967) as Kanayama
- The Militarists (1970) as Nakata
- Men and War (1970) as Seishirō Itagaki
- Yakuza Deka (1970) as Chief Detective
- Yakuza Cop 3: Poison Gas Affair (1971) as Furuya
- Battle of Okinawa (1971) as major general Sanada
- Zatoichi in Desperation (1972) as Inokichi
- Yakuza tai G-men Otori (1973) as Matsuji Matsukawa
- Karafuto 1945 Summer Hyosetsu no Mon (1973) as Regimental Commander Shimizu
- The Last Samurai (1974) as Ikizō Murata
- Cops vs. Thugs (1975) as Ikeda
- The Gate of Youth (1975) as Kijima
- Fumō Chitai (1976) as Army Chief General of Kwantung Army
- Yakuza Graveyard (1976) as Investigative section manager Kojima
- Doberman Cop (1977) as Takeo Sano
- Ashita no Joe (1980) as Danpei Tange (voice)
- Yakyū-kyō no Uta (1988) as Tokyo Mets owner Matsukawa
- Theater of Life (1983) as Sugigen
- Fire Festival (1985) as Coolie
- The Second is a Christian (1985) as Hakamada
- Sure Death 4: Revenge (1987) as Minami-machi-bugyō
- 226/Four Days of Snow and Blood (1989) as Hisaichi Terauchi
- Under Aurora (1990)

=== Television drama ===
- Minamoto no Yoshitsune (1966) as Adachi Saburō Kiyotsune
- Moeyo Ken (1970) as Endō
- Kogarashi Monjirō (1972) (ep.5) as Gennosuke
- Nemuri Kyōshirō (1972) (ep.2)
- Lone Wolf and Cub (1973) (ep.9) as Tsunehei
- Oshizamurai Kiichihōgan (1973) (ep.1) as Jūbei
- The Water Margin (1973) (ep.3) as Shi Qian
- Zatoichi (1974) (ep.6) as Yasugorō
- Taiyō ni Hoero! (1974) (ep.119) as Fukushima, (1985) (ep.636) as Kōzō Nagata
- G-Men '75 (1975) (ep.27) as Chief of Investigation Headquarters Sapporo police station, (1977) (ep.105) as Nakahara
- Hissatsu Shiokiya Kagyō (1975) (ep.8) as Iseya
- Daitsuiseki (1978) (ep.2)
- Edo Professional Hissatsu Shōbainin (1978) (ep.9) as Okuraya
- Seibu Keisatsu (1979–82) as Daisaku Tani
- Hissatsu Shigotonin III (1983) (ep.29) as Dengorō
- Hissatsu Masshigura! (1986) as Mukojima Jinjurō
- Papa wa Newscaster (1987) as director of The Press
- Sanbiki ga Kiru! (1988) (ep.14)as kiheiji
- Onihei Hankachō (1989) as Sakizō
- Shogun Iemitsu Shinobi Tabi special (1990) as Fuyukichi
