= Hissatsu: Sure Death =

1984 Japanese film

- Film poster
- Directed by: Masahisa Sadanaga
- Written by: Tatsuo Nogami; Tsuyoshi Yoshida
- Starring: Makoto Fujita; Kunihiko Mitamura; Isuzu Yamada
- Production company: Shôchiku Eiga
- Release date: January 1, 1984 (Japan)
- Running time: 123 minutes
- Country: Japan
- Language: Japanese

Hissatsu: Sure Death (Japanese: 必殺! THE HISSATSU) is a 1984 Japanese film based on the jidaigeki television series Hissatsu Shigotonin. The film is an occasionally whimsical drama about assassins.

== Plot ==
Nakamura Mondo is an officer of the Minamimachi Bugyosho, but is also the head of the assassin group. When unidentified corpses are discovered one after another in the town of Edo, Mondo is ordered by his boss Tanaka to investigate a serial murder.

== Cast ==
- Makoto Fujita as Nakamura Mondo
- Kunihiko Mitamura as Hide
- Izumi Ayukawa as Kayo
- Kiyoshi Nakajō as Yuji
- Isuzu Yamada as Oriku
- Kin Sugai as Nakamura Sen
- Mari Shiraki as Nakamura Ritsu
- Toshio Yamauchi as Tanaka
- Gannosuke Ashiya as Masa
- Keiko Hayshi as Otami
- Shōhei Hino as Senta
- Kie Nakai as Oyō
- Yukiji Asaoka as Okō
- Naoko Ken as Oyone
- Fujio Akatsuka as Kasumi no Hankichi
- Takao Kataoka as Asanosuke

== Reception ==
- Japan Academy Film Prize for Outstanding Performance by an Actress in a Supporting Role : Kin Sugai
