= Shin Hissatsu Shigotonin =

Japanese TV drama series

- Also known as: 新・必殺仕事人
- Genre: Jidaigeki
- Directed by: Eiichi Kudo; Tokuzō Tanaka
- Starring: Makoto Fujita; Kunihiko Mitamura; Kiyoshi Nakajō; Izumi Ayukawa; Isuzu Yamada; Kin Sugai
- Country of origin: Japan
- Original language: Japanese
- No. of episodes: 55

Production
- Producers: Hisashi Yamauchi; Rikyū Nakagawa
- Running time: 45 minutes (per episode)
- Production companies: Asahi Broadcasting Corporation; Shochiku

Original release
- Network: ANN (ABC, TV Asahi)
- Release: 1981 – 1982

Shin Hissatsu Shigotonin (新・必殺仕事人) is a Japanese television jidaigeki or period drama that was broadcast in 1981 to 1982. It is the 17th in the Hissatsu series. The drama is a sequel to Hissatsu Shigotonin.

== Cast ==
- Makoto Fujita as Mondo Nakamura
- Kunihiko Mitamura as Kazarishokunin no Hide
- Kiyoshi Nakajō as Shamisenya no Yuji
- Izumi Ayukawa as Nandemoya no Kayo
- Isuzu Yamada as Oriku
- Kin Sugai as Sen Nakamura
- Mari Shiraki as Ritsu Nakamura
- Fujio Suga as Uchiyama
- Toshio Yamauchi as Chief Constable (Hittōdōshin) Kumagorō Tanaka
