= Hissatsu! III Ura ka Omote ka =

1986 Japanese film

- Film poster
- Directed by: Eiichi Kudo
- Written by: Tatsuo Nogami; Katsuyuki Nakamura
- Produced by: Shochiku Eiga
- Starring: Makoto Fujita; Kunihiko Mitamura; Hiroaki Murakami; Mikio Narita; Keiko Matsuzaka
- Cinematography: Shigeru Ishihara
- Edited by: Koichi Sonoi
- Music by: Masaaki Hirao
- Distributed by: Shochiku
- Release date: May 24, 1986 (Japan)
- Running time: 126 minutes
- Country: Japan
- Language: Japanese

Hissatsu! III Ura ka Omote ka (Japanese: 必殺! III 裏か表か), also known as Sure Death! 3, is a 1986 Japanese film directed by Eiichi Kudo based on the television jidaigeki Hissatsu series Hissatsu Shigotonin V Gekitouhen. The film is an occasionally whimsical Japanese drama about assassins. It was theatrically released by Shochiku on May 24, 1986, in Japan.

== Plot ==
One day, Mondo Nakamura's colleague (Kiyohara) of Minamimachi Bugyo-sho is killed. Kiyohara was blackmailing Masuya. When Mondo visits Masuya, he senses Masuya is something to do with Kiyohara's death.

== Cast ==
- Makoto Fujita as Mondo Nakamura
- Kunihiko Mitamura as Hide
- Hiroaki Murakami as Masa
- Masaki Kyomoto as Ryu
- Ayukawa Izumi as Kayo
- Toshio Shiba as Ichi
- Shōfukutei Tsurube II as San
- Toshio Yamauchi as Tanaka Sama
- Takuzo Kawatani as Kiyohara
- Kin Sugai as Sen Nakamura
- Mari Shiraki as Ritsu Nakamura
- Ittoku Kishibe as Hikomatsu
- Masatō Ibu
- Junkichi Orimoto as Kanō Heima
- Tatsuo Endō as Rusui
- Mikio Narita as Masuya
- Keiko Matsuzaka as Oko
