= Hiroaki Murakami =

Japanese actor

- Born: 村上弘明; December 22, 1956 (age 69); Rikuzentakata, Iwate Prefecture, Japan
- Occupation: Actor
- Years active: 1978 – Present

Hiroaki Murakami (村上 弘明, Murakami Hiroaki; born December 22, 1956) is a Japanese actor. He specializes in jidaigeki roles, and has also taken parts in tokusatsu and modern productions.

== Career ==
Born in Rikuzentakata, Iwate Prefecture, he enrolled in Hosei University but withdrew when he successfully auditioned for a part in Kamen Rider. He made his debut as Hiroshi Tsukuba in Skyrider.

Hiroaki appeared in a lot of jidaigeki television dramas. He appeared the NHK jidaigeki On'yado Kawasemi in 1980–81, and in a new series Shin On'yado Kawasemi in 1997. He appeared in the Hissatsu series drama Hissatsu Shigotonin V as the florist-turned-blacksmith named Masa, and as a repeating character in Series and popularity.

Five Taiga drama roles are among his credits. They are in Haru no Hatō (1985), Kōsaka Masanobu in Takeda Shingen (1988), Fujiwara no Kiyohira in Homura Tatsu (1993), Akechi Mitsuhide in Hideyoshi (1996), and Yanagisawa Yoshiyasu in Genroku Ryōran (1999). In the annual TV Tokyo New Year's spectacular, he portrayed Sasaki Kojirō in Miyamoto Musashi (1990), Kira no Nikichi in Jirōchō Sangokushi (1991), Yagyū Jūbei in Tokugawa Bugeichō Yagyū Sandai no Ken (1993), and Araki Mataemon in Tenka Sōran Tokugawa Sandai no Inbō (2006). Among the jidaigeki series he has starred in are Hatchōbori no Shichinin (2000–06), Zenigata Heiji (2004–05), Yagyū Jūbei Nanaban Shōbu (2005–07), and Shikaku Ukeoinin (2007). Additionally, he portrayed Oda Nobunaga in Taikōki Tenka o Neratta Otoko: Hideyoshi (2006).)

He has appeared in more than fifteen films, including several in the Kamen Rider and Hissatsu franchises. Further films to his credit include Gokudō no Onnatachi 2, Juliet Game, and Iron Maze (In a Grove).

== Filmography ==
=== Film ===
- No More Easy Life (1979)
- 8 Kamen Riders vs. Galaxy King (1980) as Sky Rider
- Jerashî gêmu (1982) as Eiji Haga
- P.P. Rider (1983) as Kinta
- Hissatsu! Buraun-kan no kaibutsutachi (1985) as Masa the florist
- Hissatsu! III Ura ka Omote ka (1986)
- Purushian burû no shôzô (1986)
- Let's Gôtoku-ji! (1987)
- Sure Death 4: Revenge (1987) as Masa
- Gokudo no onna-tachi 2 (1987) as Ryoji Kimoto
- Ikidomari no Banka: Brake out (1988) as Koji Nishimura
- Juliet Game (1989) as Masahiko
- Iron Maze (1991) as Sugita
- Hissatsu!5 Ōgon no Chi (1991)
- Hissatsu! Mondo Shisu (1996)
- 17sai tabidachi no futari (2003)
- Shibuya monogatari (2005) as Noboru Ando
- Tannka (2005) as M
- Daichi no uta (2011)
- Love for Beginners (2012) as Keita Tsubaki
- Kyôryû wo horô! (2013)
- Idainaru, Shurarabon (2014)
- Bannou kanteishi Q: Mona Riza no hitomi (2014)
- Usogui: Lie Eater (2022) as Hikoichi Yakō
- Kamaishi Ramen Monogatari (2023)
- Seppuku: The Sun Goes Down (2025)
- Shasen Henkō (TBA)

=== Television ===
- Kamen Rider Skyrider (1979) as Hiroshi Tsukuba / Sky Rider
- On'yado Kawasemi (1980-1983)
- Hissatsu Shigotonin V (1985) as Hanaya no Masa
- Hissatsu Shigotonin V Gekitouhen (1986) as Kajiya no Masa
- Hissatsu Shigotonin V Senpuhen (1986-1987) as Masa
- Hissatsu Shigotonin V Fuunryūkohen (1987) as Masa
- Takeda Shingen (1988) as Kōsaka Masanobu
- Homura Tatsu (1993) as Fujiwara no Kiyohira
- Hideyoshi (1996) as Akechi Mitsuhide
- Shinsengumi Keppūroku (1998) as Toshizo Hijikata
- Genroku Ryoran (1999) as Yanagisawa Yoshiyasu
- Nene: Onna Taikōki (2009)
- Yae's Sakura (2013)
- 24 Japan (2020) as Heisuke Satonaka
- Miss Kuroitsu from the Monster Development Department (2022) as Narrator (episode 2)
