= Hissatsu Shigotonin V =

Japanese TV drama series

- Also known as: 必殺仕事人V・激闘編
- Genre: Jidaigeki
- Directed by: Yoshiyuki Kuroda; Tokuzō Tanaka
- Starring: Makoto Fujita; Masaki Kyomoto; Hiroaki Murakami; Izumi Ayukawa; Isuzu Yamada; Kin Sugai
- Country of origin: Japan
- Original language: Japanese
- No. of episodes: 26

Production
- Producer: Hisashi Yamauchi
- Running time: 45 minutes (per episode)
- Production companies: Asahi, Shochiku

Original release
- Network: TV Asahi
- Release: January 11 – July 26, 1985

Hissatsu Shigotonin V (必殺仕事人V) is a Japanese television jidaigeki drama that was broadcast in 1985 to 1986. It is the 23rd in the Hissatsu series. Isuzu Yamada made her final appearance in the Hissatsu series.

== Plot ==
Kumihimoya no Ryu is a maker of cords used to tie obi and is an ex-ninja. Hanaya no Masa runs flower shop. They join Nakamura Mondo and Oriku's Shigotonin team replacing Hide and Yuji in the sequel to Hissatsu Shigotonin IV.

== Cast ==
- Makoto Fujita as Mondo Nakamura
- Masaki Kyomoto as Kumihimoya no Ryu
- Hiroaki Murakami as Hanaya no Masa
- Ayukawa Izumi as Nandemoya no Kayo
- Ippie Hikaru as Junnosuke Nishi
- Isuzu Yamada as Oriku (episode1-11)
- Kin Sugai as Sen Nakamura
- Mari Shiraki as Ritsu Nakamura
- Yoko Nada as Oshin
- Toshio Yamauchi as Chief Constable (Hittōdōshin) Kumagorō Tanaka
- Sakae Umezu as Tamasuke
