= Masaki Kyomoto =

Masaki Kyomoto 京本政樹
- Born: January 21, 1959 (age 67); Suita, Osaka Prefecture
- Origin: Japan
- Genres: Pop
- Occupations: Actor, guitarist, Singer-song writer
- Years active: 1979–present
- Website: https://la-cetzna.com/profile

Masaki Kyomoto (京本 政樹, Kyōmoto Masaki; January 21, 1959 –) is a Japanese actor, singer-song writer, and guitarist. He is famous for playing the role of Ryu on the television jidaigeki Hissatsu series.

He has appeared in films and television series including Legend of the Eight Samurai, Sukeban Deka, Kamen Rider Black,Kamen Rider Agito, Ultraman: Towards the Future (aka Ultraman Great), Cutie Honey, Chage and Aska, Ōedo Sōsamō, Mito Kōmon, Anmitsu Hime, Food Fight, Ultraman Tiga, Ultraman Dyna, Ii Hito, GARO, Tenchu:Yamino Shiokinin and most recently 81diver. He has performed on the soundtracks to GARO and Garo Special: Byakuya no Maju, performing the first two ending themes for the former, and producing GARO Project's performances of the final two ending themes for the series and the ending theme for the special.

Masaki got a role in a buster film Legend of the Eight Samurai as Inuzuka Shino and it became a sensation that lead to Masaki's break out role "Ryu" on a popular Japanese period piece samurai drama series Hissatsu Shigotonin where he played Japanese obi-belt maker who is ex-ninja turned to be an assassin (shigotonin) to kill bad guys. He became a big star by that role and since then has appeared in numerous period piece drama series. He often plays a role much younger than his actual age due to youthful appearance. His picture with his son Taiga Kyomoto (SixTONES) went viral in Asia and many thought he is Taiga's older brother instead of father. He is an established musician as well produced sound track for TV shows and music for himself and other singers.

== Discography ==
Albums

- Rabelais no 15-fun (ラブレーの15分, Raburē no Jūgofun; "Fifteen Minutes of Rabelais") - February 21, 1984
- Temptation - October 21, 1984
- Hisui no Kimochi ga Wakaru Yoru (翡翠の気持ちがわかる夜; "The Night of Knowing Beautiful Feelings") - June 21, 1985
- Party - November 21, 1985
- Kyoshoku no Cassanova (虚飾のカサノバ, Kyoshoku no Kasanoba; "The Affectionate Cassanova") - August 21, 1986
- My present - November 21, 1986
- Best Selection 20 (ベスト・セレクション20, Besuto Serekushon 20) - June 21, 1987
- Shōnen-tachi no Yoru (少年たちの夜; "Night of the Boys") - November 1, 1987
- Taiyō no Kakera (太陽のかけら; "Piece of the Sun") - November 1, 1987
- Ichi Oku no Koi (一億の恋; "One Hundred Million Loves") - May 1, 1988
- Kirameki ~ Jūni Seiza no Onnatachi~ (煌～十二星座の女達～; "Gleam ~ The Women of the Zodiac") - December 21, 1988
- LOVE IS ALL - December 23, 1998
- Peine (苦悩～Peine～; "Anguish") - May 26, 2004
- Boku ga Ai o Tsutaeteyuku (僕が愛を伝えてゆく; "I'll Keep Showing You My Love") - November 23, 2005
- Golden Best: Tokyo Blue ~Kodoku na Tenshi-tachi~ (ゴールデン☆ベスト Tokyo Blue～孤独な天使たち～, Gōruden Besuto Tōkyō Burū ~Kodoku na Tenshi-tachi~; "Golden Best: Tokyo Blue ~The Solitary Angels~) - March 20, 2013
- Masaki Kyomoto Music works 1982-2014 30th anniversary special Edition June 7, 2014

Singles

- "I Can't Say..." (I Can't say… 「とまどい……」, I Can't say... [Tomadoi......]) - March 5, 1984
- "Kanashimi Iro no..." (哀しみ色の…; "The Sad Color of...") - December 24, 1984
- "Kaze no Sarah" (風のセーラ, Kaze no Sēra; "Sarah's Wind") - November 1, 1987
- "Yumeningyō" (夢人形; "Dream Doll") - November 1, 1987
- "BLUE EYE'S MEMORY" - September 25, 1988
- "Marude Kanashimi ga Ame no Yō ni Kuchizukeru" (まるで悲しみが雨のように口づける; "A Kiss as Sad as the Rain") - April 25, 1997
- "Itoshikute..." (いとしくて…; "My Love...") - January 21, 2001
- "Sakurauta" (薄桜記（さくらうた）; "Sakura Song") - November 26, 2004
- "I LOVE YOU" - July 21, 2005
- "Yasashii Kotoba" (優しい言葉; "Kind Words") - February 8, 2006
- "Boku wa Mada Koi o Shite wa Ikenai" (僕はまだ恋をしてはいけない; "I Shouldn't Still Be Loving") - February 8, 2006
- Doubt -April 1, 2015

Soundtracks

- "Bokura no Great / Chikyū wa Kimi o Matteita" (ぼくらのグレート／地球は君を待っていた, Bokura no Gurēto / Chikyū wa Kimi o Matteita; "Our Great / The Earth Is Waiting For You") - December 1, 1990
  - For Ultraman Great
- "Mirai e Mukatte / The Earth is hurtin'" (未来へ向かって／The Earth is hurtin'; "Toward the Future / The Earth is Hurtin'") - December 21, 1990
  - For Ultraman Great
- "Ultraman Love For Children" (ウルトラマンLOVE FOR CHILDREN, Urutoraman LOVE FOR CHILDREN) - November 1, 1991
- Hissatsu Shigotonin IV/Hissatsu Shigotonin V/Hissatsu Hashikakenin Original Soundtrack Collection 15 (必殺仕事人IV / 必殺仕事人V / 必殺橋掛人 ― オリジナル・サウンドトラック全集 15) - May 22, 1996
- Hissatsu Shigotonin Gekitōhen/Senpūhen/Fūunryūkohen Original Soundtrack Collection 16 (必殺仕事人 激闘編 / 旋風編 / 風雲竜虎編 ― オリジナル・サウンドトラック全集 16) - May 22, 1996
- GARO: Original Sound Track (「牙狼〈GARO〉」音楽集, Garo Ongakushū) - April 26, 2006
- Hissatsu Sountra Collection: Pachinko Hissatsu Shigotonin III (必殺サントラ・コレクション ぱちんこ必殺仕事人III) - April 26, 2006

Production work

- "Yume no Tsuzuki" (夢の続き; "The Dream Continues") by Kouichi Uenoyama - October 21, 1984
- "Onna wa Umi" (女は海; "A Woman Is an Ocean") by Izumi Ayukawa - November 21, 1985
- "BLUE EYE'S MEMORY" by Kazunasa Ogata - August 21, 1988
- "GARO ~Boku ga Ai o Tsutaeteyuku~" by Garo Project - July 17, 2006
- "Akai Bara/Aurora no Shita de" (赤いバラ／オーロラの下で, Akai Bara/Ōrora no Shita de; "Red Rose/Beneath the Aurora") by Garo Project - November 22, 2006
- "Onna wa Umi" by Tsuyoshi Seto - February 6, 2008

== Filmography ==
=== Films ===
- Legend of the Eight Samurai (1983), Inuzuka Shino Moritaka
- Hissatsu! III Ura ka Omote ka (1986)
- Shogun's Shadow (1989), Tokugawa Iemitsu
- Fly Me to the Saitama (2019), Duke Saitama
- Homura (2026), Matsumoto Ujisuke

=== Television ===
- Kusa Moeru (1979), Komawaka-maru (later known as Miura Mitsumura)
- Hissatsu Shigotonin V (1985)
- Hissatsu Shigotonin V Gekitouhen (1985–86)
- Ōedo Sōsamō (1990–91),
- Kōkō Kyōshi (1993), Tomoki Fujimura
- Homeless Child (1994), Kazuhiko Kurosaki
- Mōri Motonari (1997), Kikkawa Okitsune
- The Sun Never Sets (2000), Etsushi Minami
- Kōkō Kyōshi (2003), Tomoki Fujimura
- Satomi Hakken-Den - The Legend of the Eight Dog Warriors (2006), Shigeuji Ashikaga
- Taira no Kiyomori (2012), Fujiwara no Hidehira
