= Hissatsu Shigotonin IV =

Japanese television program

- Also known as: 必殺仕事人IV
- Genre: Jidaigeki
- Directed by: Youichi Harada; Tokuzō Tanaka
- Starring: Makoto Fujita; Kunihiko Mitamura; Kiyoshi Nakajō; Izumi Ayukawa; Isuzu Yamada; Kin Sugai
- Country of origin: Japan
- Original language: Japanese
- No. of episodes: 43

Production
- Producers: Hisashi Yamauchi; Yozō Sakurai
- Running time: 45 minutes (per episode)
- Production companies: Asahi, Shochiku

Original release
- Network: TV Asahi
- Release: 1983 – 1984

Hissatsu Shigotonin IV (必殺仕事人IV) is a Japanese television jidaigeki or period drama that was broadcast in 1983 to 1984. It is the 21st in the Hissatsu series. The drama is a sequel to Hissatsu Shigotonin III.

== Cast ==
- Makoto Fujita as Mondo Nakamura
- Kunihiko Mitamura as Kazarishokunin no Hide
- Kiyoshi Nakajō as Shamisenya no Yuji
- Izumi Ayukawa as Nandemoya no Kayo
- Ippei Hikaru as Junnosuke Nishi
- Isuzu Yamada as Oriku
- Kin Sugai as Sen Nakamura
- Mari Shiraki as Ritsu Nakamura
- Toshio Yamauchi as Chief Constable (Hittōdōshin) Kumagorō Tanaka
- Keiko Hayashi as Otami
- Sakae Umezu as Tamasuke
