= Kurayami Shitomenin =

- Also known as: 暗闇仕留人
- Genre: Jidaigeki
- Directed by: Eiichi Kudo; Koreyoshi Kurahara; Kenji Misumi
- Starring: Koji Ishizaka; Makoto Fujita; Yousuke Kondo; Yumiko Nogawa; Yuriko Mishima; Taisaku Akino
- Theme music composer: Masaaki Hirao
- Ending theme: Midori Nishizaki "Ryoshu"
- Country of origin: Japan
- Original language: Japanese
- No. of episodes: 27

Production
- Producers: Hisashi Yamauchi; Rikyū Nakagawa
- Running time: 45 minutes (per episode)
- Production companies: Asahi Broadcasting Corporation; Shochiku

Original release
- Network: JNN (ABC, TBS)
- Release: 29 June – 28 December 1974

Kurayami Shitomenin (暗闇仕留人) is a Japanese television jidaigeki or period drama that was broadcast in 1974. It is the 4th in the Hissatsu series. The drama is a sequel to Hissatsu Shiokinin. This would ultimately become the last entry in the Hissatsu series to air on the TBS-run JNN network due to the Asahi Broadcasting Corporation the franchise's producer, switching to the NET-run ANN network.

== Plot ==
Itoi Mitsugu was a scholar of Rangaku but after Bansha no goku happened, he lives as a Shamisen player. He and Daikichi join Nakamura Monodo's team and kill bad guys.

== Cast ==
- Koji Ishizaka as Itoi Mitsugu
- Makoto Fujita as Nakamura Mondo
- Yosuke Kondo as Daikichi
- Yumiko Nogawaas Okin
- Masaaki Tsusaka as Hanji
- Mari Shiraki as Ritsu Nakamura
- Kin Sugai as Sen Nakamura

== See also ==
- Hissatsu Shikakenin (First in the Hissatsu series)
- Hissatsu Shiokinin (2nd in the Hissatsu series)
- Shin Hissatsu Shiokinin (10th in the Hissatsu series)
