= Lupin III: Strange Psychokinetic Strategy =

1974 Japanese action comedy film by Takashi Tsuboshima

- DVD cover
- Directed by: Takashi Tsuboshima
- Screenplay by: Hiroshi Nagano
- Based on: Lupin III by Monkey Punch
- Produced by: Yutaka Fujioka; Kameo Ōki
- Starring: Yūki Meguro; Eiko Ezaki; Maria Anzai; Shirō Itō; Kunie Tanaka; Rin'ichi Yamamoto; Minoru Uezu
- Cinematography: Kōji Ichihara
- Edited by: Sachiko Yamaji
- Music by: Masaru Sato
- Production companies: Toho; International Television Films
- Distributed by: Toho
- Release date: August 3, 1974 (Japan)
- Running time: 82 minutes
- Country: Japan
- Language: Japanese

Lupin III: Strange Psychokinetic Strategy (Japanese: ルパン三世 念力珍作戦, Hepburn: Rupan Sansei: Nenriki Chin Sakusen) is a 1974 Japanese action comedy film directed by Takashi Tsuboshima and based on the 1967–69 manga series Lupin III by Monkey Punch. It was the first film adaptation of the manga.

In the film, the grandson of the gentleman thief Arsène Lupin has no interest in reviving his family's crime organization, and lives as a vagabond. After breaking his love interest Fujiko Mine out of prison, Lupin III joins her in an ambitious jewel heist. The event allows his family's traditional enemies to locate him, and Lupin has to survive attacks by their assassins.

== Plot ==
Lupin III joyrides through Tokyo. Happening upon a prisoner transport van escorting beautiful thief Fujiko Mine to prison, a smitten Lupin resolves to help her escape and win her heart. Though he breaks her out of prison that night, Fujiko knocks him unconscious and flees. Lupin is arrested and interrogated by Inspector Zenigata but, with no evidence linking Lupin to the jailbreak, Zenigata must release him.

Lupin's grandfather was Arsène Lupin, a French gentleman thief. Arsène's son, Lupin II, expanded the criminal enterprise to the worldwide "Lupin Empire", an organization with tens of thousands of recruits; he was eventually betrayed and his organization was crushed by the rival Maccherone crime family. Marksman Daisuke Jigen, the sole survivor of this massacre, has since searched for any surviving members of the Lupin family who could revive the crime empire. Though Jigen is able to ally himself with Lupin III, he is disappointed to discover the young man prefers to live freely as a criminal vagabond and shows no interest in rebuilding the Lupin Empire.

Inspector Zenigata, accompanied by detectives Ooka (descendant of Ōoka Tadasuke) and Toyama (descendant of Tōyama Kagemoto), is assigned to investigate Lupin as the police department lacks any evidence with which to press charges. Though they come face-to-face with Lupin and Jigen at a scrap yard, the criminals are able to escape with ease while Zenigata suffers injuries from the chase. Later, at Fujiko's behest, Lupin attempts to steal 560 billion yen's worth of jewelry from an exhibition. A squad of policemen, led by Zenigata, are waiting in the exhibit's vault and give chase. Though Lupin and Jigen escape, they lose track of the jewels in the confusion; Fujiko, having eluded the police, takes them for herself.

The head of the Maccherone crime family, having learned that a descendant of Lupin is alive and active in Japan, is concerned that a revived Lupin Empire may again threaten their organization. He commands the organization to kill Jigen and Lupin, and hitmen are dispatched. Lupin is able to defeat the assassins – a cowboy, a sniper duo, and a sextet of dancers disguised as nuns – but decides to surrender himself to Zenigata for protection.

Assuming that the captive Lupin will soon be executed, the Maccherone boss turns his focus to a new mission: stealing a dogū figurine thought to contain psychokinetic energy, to be auctioned off on the black market. Fujiko, spying on the meeting and hoping to take the figure for herself, is discovered and captured. Though Lupin had been content to stay in prison, the news of Fujiko's capture spurs him into action and he breaks out to save her. Zenigata is taken off the Lupin case and reassigned to transport the psychokinetic figure to a national research facility.

Maccherone thugs ambush the police convoy on a mountain trail. Jigen, piloting a helicopter, takes advantage of the confusion to steal away the statue; meanwhile, Lupin moves to rescue Fujiko from her nearby confinement. Though Jigen retrieves Lupin and the freed Fujiko, a puncture in his helicopter's gasoline tank forces him to make an emergency landing. Ironically, the trio lands at the research facility: they have accidentally delivered the statue to its intended destination.

The police chief prepares an official certificate of thanks for Lupin for his efforts in saving a national treasure, and a frustrated Zenigata is assigned to hand-deliver the award. Lupin, Fujiko, and Jigen relax by the city docks, with Jigen reflecting that the reformation of the Lupin Empire is unlikely. When Zenigata arrives, the group mistakenly believes he is there to arrest them and a madcap chase ensues.

== Cast ==
- Yūki Meguro as Arsène Lupin III (Note: Unlike the manga, where the character is mononymously referred to as "Lupin", Strange Psychokinetic Strategy explicitly gives him the first name "Arsène".)
- Eizo Ezaki as Fujiko Mine
- Kunie Tanaka as Daisuke Jigen
- Shirō Itō as Inspector Heiji Zenigata VII
- Maria Anzai as The Girl at the Wharf
- Kiyoshi Maekawa as Marutakadai
- Hsiao Hui-mei as The Woman in Orange Dress
- "The Poppies" as The Dragon Sisters
- Akira Hitomi as Detective Ōoka
- Takashi Ebata as Detective Toyama
- Rinichi Yamamoto as Genkurobei
- Arihiro Fujimura as The Superintendent of the Metropolitan Police
- E.H. Erick as Sir Mokkinbat
- Hideyo Amamoto as Assassin at Orphanage
- Rena Natsuki as Yamako Asama
- Fujio Tokita as The Vagrant
- Akira Ōizumi as Ichiro Rokunawa, an Assassin
- Sachio Sakai as Security chief
- Toki Shiozawa
- Katsumi Ishiyama
- Jun'ichi Tanaka as Miroku Ōguchi
- Minoru Uezu as Gosaku Inakadori
- Shōzō Fukuyama
- Sanji Kojima
- Katsuo Unno
- Kyūji Aozora as Policeman at the Police Box
- Kōji Aozora as Motorcycle Policeman
- Tōru Ōhira
- Enver Altenbay as Big Boss (uncredited)
