= Hissatsu Karakurinin =

- Also known as: 必殺からくり人
- Genre: Jidaigeki
- Directed by: Eiichi Kudo; Koreyoshi Kurahara
- Starring: Ken Ogata; Judy Ongg; Isuzu Yamada; Kensaku Morita
- Country of origin: Japan
- Original language: Japanese
- No. of episodes: 13

Production
- Producers: Hisashi Yamauchi; Rikyū Nakagawa
- Running time: 45 minutes (per episode)
- Production companies: Asahi Broadcasting Corporation; Shochiku

Original release
- Network: ANN (ABC, NET)
- Release: 1976 – 1976

Hissatsu Karakurinin (必殺からくり人) is a Japanese television jidaigeki or period drama that was broadcast in prime-time in 1976. It is 8th in the Hissatsu series.

== Cast ==
- Ken Ogata as Tokiya Yumejirō
- Isuzu Yamada as Hananoya
- Gannosuke Ashiya as Tobei
- Kanppie Hazama as Heromatsu
- Judy Ongg as Tombo
- Kensaku Morita as Shikake no Tenppie
