= Hissatsu! Shamisenya no Yuji =

1999 film

- Directed by: Shigeru Ishihara
- Written by: Tatsuo Nogami
- Starring: Kiyoshi Nakajō; Hiroshi Abe; Yūki Amami; Shōhei Hino; Makoto Fujita
- Production company: Shôchiku Eiga
- Release date: February 11, 1999 (Japan)
- Running time: 102 minutes
- Country: Japan
- Language: Japanese

Hissatsu! Shamisenya no Yuji (Japanese: 必殺! 三味線屋・勇次; lit. Certain-Kill! Yuji of the Shamisen Shop) is a 1999 Japanese film based on the jidaigeki Hissatsu television series.

== Cast ==
- Kiyoshi Nakajō as Yuji
- Yūki Amami as Otoyo
- Hiroshi Abe as Yasuke
- Yuko Natori as Otaki
- Makoto Fujita as Denbei
- Akira Nakao as Tokiya Tōubei
- Renji Ishibashi as Itamaki
- Hirotarō Honda as Asakichi
- Kentaro Shimizu as Uchida Heinai
- Naoko Ken as Oseki
- Sachiyo Nomura
- Shōhei Hino as Karasuma no Kengyō
