= Kunihiko Mitamura =

Japanese actor (born 1953)

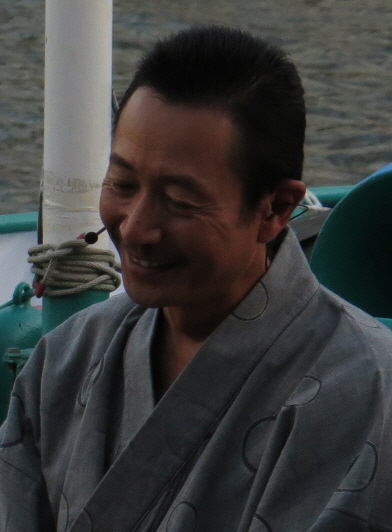
- Born: October 22, 1953 (age 72); Niigata, Japan
- Occupation: Actor
- Years active: 1979–present
- Spouse: Mari Nakayama (m. 1980; div. 1999)

Kunihiko Mitamura (Japanese: 三田村 邦彦, Hepburn: Mitamura Kunihiko; born October 22, 1953 in Niigata) is a Japanese actor and singer. He is well known for his role in Taiyō ni Hoero! and Hide in the Hissatsu series.

== Selected filmography ==
=== Film ===
- Almost Transparent Blue (1979) as Ryu
- Hissatsu: Sure Death (1984) as Hide
- W's Tragedy (1984) as Jun Godai
- Fireflies in the North (1984) as Denji Masaki
- Hissatsu! Braunkan no Kaibutsutachi (1985) as Hide
- Hissatsu! III Ura ka Omote ka (1986) as Hide
- Sure Death 4: Revenge (1987) as Hide
- Godzilla vs. Biollante (1989) as Kirishima Kazuhito
- Hissatsu!5 Ōgon no Chi (1991) as Hide
- Hissatsu! Mondo Shisu (1996) as Hide
- Taiyō no Futa (2016) as Naoto Kan

=== Television ===
- Hissatsu series
  - Hissatsu Shigotonin (1979–81) as Kazarushokunin no Hide
  - Shin Hissatsu Shigotonin (1981–82)
  - Hissatsu Shigotonin III (1982–83)
  - Hissatsu Shigotonin IV (1983–84)
  - Hissatsu Masshigura! (1986)
  - Hissatsu Shigotonin Gekitotsu (1991–92)
- Taiyō ni Hoero!(1982–84) as Masayuki Hara (Gypsy)
- Wataru Seken wa Oni Bakari (1991–Present)
- Shogun Iemitsu Shinobi Tabi (1991, 1992–93) as Tokugawa Iemitsu
- Shōgun no Onmitsu! Kage Jūhachi (1996)
- Gō (2011) as Katagiri Katsumoto

=== Culture Program ===
- Otona Machiaruki (2009–present)

== Selected discography ==
=== Singles ===
- Imahashire Imaikiru (1980) Insert song of Hissatsu Shigotonin
- Omoideno Itoguruma (1981) Ending song of Shin Hissatsu Shigotonin
- Requiem (1982)
- Kimu (1982)
- Sukitoru Kisetsu (1983)
- Unubore (1983)
- Hokubo (1985)
- Yureru Hitomi (1986) Ending song of Hissatsu Masshigura!
- Otokono Furusato (1990) Ending song of Shogun Iemitsu Shinobi Tabi
- Seishun Ikki (1992) Ending song of Shogun Iemitsu Shinobi Tabi2
- Reimei (1994)
- Love Song (2010)

=== Albums ===
- Yagatekimiwa Kisetsunonakahe (1982)
- Hissatsu no Hide (1982)
- Kazeno Akikara (1982)
- Vol.III (1983)
- Selection 12 (1984)
- My Favorite Songs (1984)
- DAY BY DAY (1985)
- MARIKO (1985)
- SOUND TRACK (1985)
- Mitamura Kunihiko Best Selection (1987)
- OLD/NEW (1987)
- Mitamura Kunihiko Zenkyokushu (1988)
