= Hissatsu Shigotonin V Fuunryūkohen =

Japanese TV drama series

- Also known as: 必殺仕事人V・風雲竜虎編
- Genre: Jidaigeki
- Directed by: Eiichi Kudo; Youichi Harada
- Starring: Makoto Fujita; Tomokazu Miura; Hiroaki Murakami
- Theme music composer: Masaaki Hirao
- Country of origin: Japan
- Original language: Japanese
- No. of episodes: 19

Production
- Producers: Hisashi Yamauchi; Yozō Sakurai
- Running time: 45 minutes (per episode)
- Production companies: Asahi, Shochiku

Original release
- Network: TV Asahi
- Release: March 13 – July 31, 1987

Hissatsu Shigotonin V Fuunryūkohen (必殺仕事人V・風雲竜虎編) is a Japanese television jidaigeki or period drama that was broadcast in 1987. It is the 28th in the Hissatsu series.

== Cast ==
- Makoto Fujita as Mondo Nakamura
- Hiroaki Murakami as Masa
- Tomokazu Miura as Kagetarō
- Kazuko Kato as Otama
- Ken Nishida as Yoriki Onizuka
- Toshio Yamauchi as Tanaka sama
- Kin Sugai as Sen Nakamura
- Mari Shiraki as Ritsu Nakamura
