= The Naked Woman and the Gun =

- Japanese movie poster
- Directed by: Seijun Suzuki
- Distributed by: Nikkatsu
- Release date: December 7, 1957 (Japan)
- Running time: 88 minutes
- Country: Japan
- Language: Japanese

The Naked Woman and the Gun (Japanese: 裸女と拳銃, Hepburn: Rajo to kenjū) is a 1957 black-and-white Japanese film directed by Seijun Suzuki.

== Cast ==
- Michitaro Mizushima : Kensaku Maki
- Hiroshi Kondō
- Joe Shishido : Mizoguchi(Detective)
- Mari Shiraki
- Shinsuke Ashida : Shozan Kanda
- Hideaki Nitani : Yuzo Sugawa
