= Yoko Yamamoto =

Japanese actress (1942–2024)

- 山本 陽子
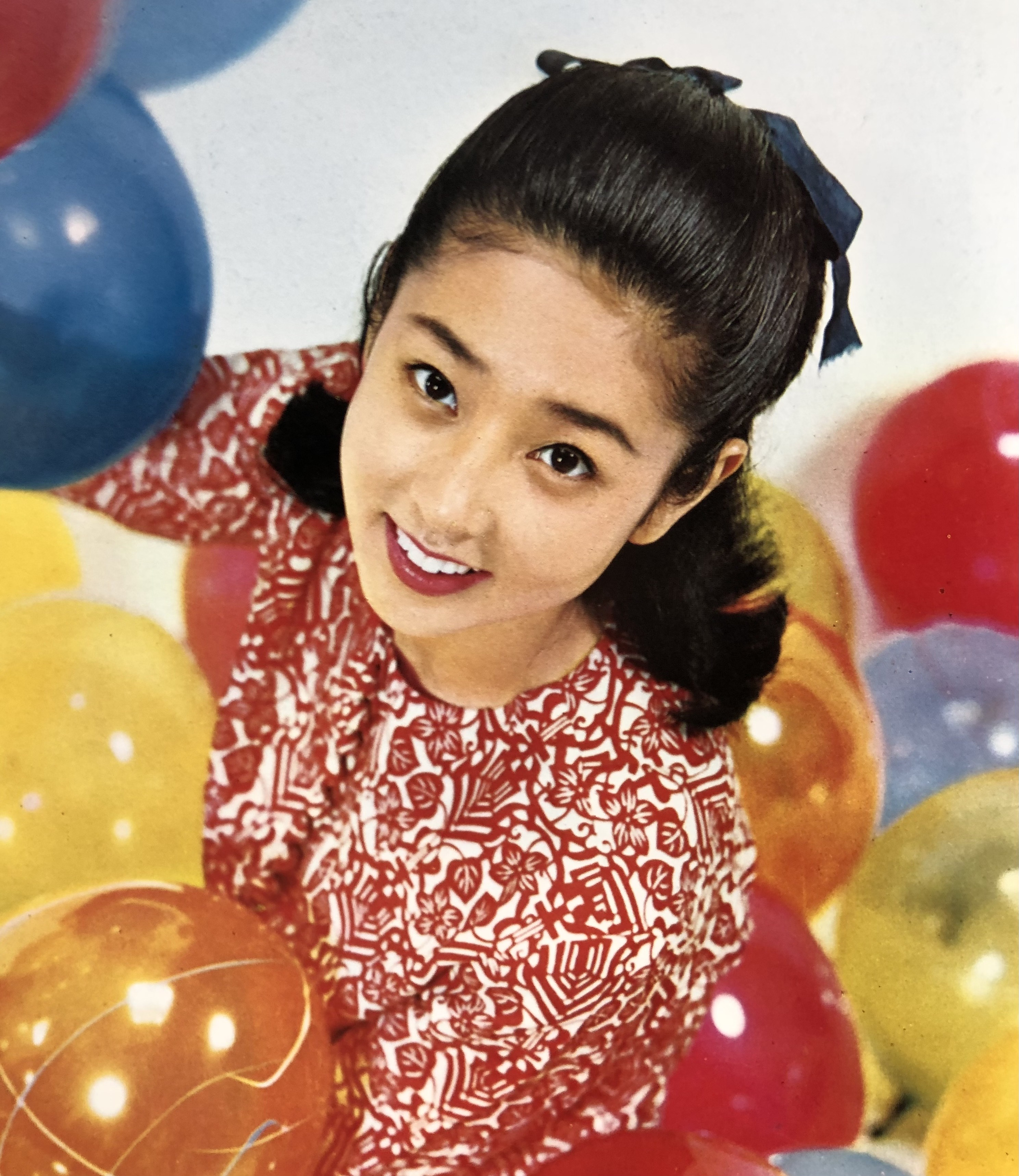
- Yamamoto in 1965
- Born: March 17, 1942; Nakano, Tokyo, Japan
- Died: February 20, 2024 (aged 81); Atami, Shizuoka Prefecture, Japan
- Education: Kokugakuin High School
- Occupation: Actress
- Years active: 1964–2024
- Known for: Tsuki Umaya Oen Jiken-chō
- Height: 1.55 m (5 ft 1 in)

Yoko Yamamoto (山本 陽子, Yamamoto Yōko; March 17, 1942 – February 20, 2024) was a Japanese actress represented by Kabushikigaisha Sanyō Kikaku. Yamamoto was born on March 17, 1942, and died on February 20, 2024, at the age of 81.

== Filmography ==
=== Films ===
Year	Title	Role	Notes	Ref.
1964	Red Handkerchief	Maid		
1964	Teigin Jiken Shikeishū			
1964	Ryōjin Nikki			
1965	Boku Dōshite Namida ga Deru no	Masako Ota		
1966	The Tale of Genji			
1967	Gappa: The Triphibian Monster			
1968	Hana no Koibito-tachi	Machiko Ibuki		
1969	Drifters-desu yo! Tokkun Tokkun Mata Tokkun			
1974	Karei-naru Ichizoku	Sanae Manpyo		
1977	Yattsu Haka-mura	Haruyo Tajimi		
1991	Hissatsu!5 Ōgon no Chi			
2016	Florence wa Nemuru	Sanae Makihane		
2019	Sorokin no mita Sakura	Kikue Takamiya		

=== TV dramas ===
NHK

Year	Title	Role	Notes
1966	Tarō		
1969	Kyūkei no Arano	Kumiko Nogami	
1973	Kunitori Monogatari	Omi no Kata	Taiga drama
1975	Seicho Matsumoto Series Jiko	Michiyo Yamanishi	
1976	Tonari no Shibafu		
1987	O Nyūgaku		
1990	Kyō, Futari		
1995	Fukagawa Ninjōmiodōri		
1998	Tokugawa Yoshinobu	Kangyōin	Taiga drama
2000	Ichigen no Koto		
2002	Han'nari Kikutarō		
2004	Koisuru Kyoto		
2010	Tomehane! Suzuri Kōkō Shodōbu		

Tokyo Broadcasting System

Year	Title	Role	Notes
1965	Zesshō		
1969	Nīzuma Kagami	Fumiyo Shichiri	
1969	Mito Kōmon		
1970	On'na to Misoshiru		Episode 16
1971	Taiyō no Namida		
1972	Shiranai Dōshi		
1973	Shiroi Kage		
1973	Utsukushiki Bon'nō		
1973	Yome Chanpon	Hiroko	
1974	Shiroi Kassōro	Satoko Kamijo	
1978	Ahiru Dai Gasshō	Natsuko Ibuki	
1979	Seicho Matsumoto On'na Series Yubi	Yumiko Fukue	
1979	Fumō Chitai	Keiko Iki	
1992	Byōin-zaka no Kubikukuri no Ie		
1993	Musume Kara no Shukudai		
1999	Akuryō Shima	Tomomi Osakabe	
2001	Battle Family: Watashi, Koi Shimasu!	Tono Yanagihara	
2012	Getsuyō Golden	Mariko Mikami	

Nippon TV

Year	Title	Notes
1972	Botchan	
1976	Yorokobi mo kanashimi mo ikutoshitsuki	Kiyoko
1987	Sarakin Gyōsha no Tsuma	

Fuji Television

Year	Title	Role	Notes
1967	Lion Okusamagekijō		
1969	Yoshida Shōin		
1970	Ōzakajō no On'na		
1971	Nyonin Musashi	Setsu	
1971	Tokugawa On'naemaki	Sayo	
1972	Nemuri Kyōshirō	Miho-dai	Episodes 1, 2, 22, and 26
1972	Ninpō Kagerō Kiri	Kaoru Chiyo	
1981	Kutsukake Tokijirō	Okinu	
1984	Oregon Kara Ai		
1989	Naokishō Sakka Suspense		
1991	Chūshingura Kaze no Maki Kumo no Maki	Riku	
1993	Hadaka no Taishō		
1993	Kin'yō Entertainment		
2013	Hakui no Namida	Mitsuko Ando	
2015	Iyashi-ya Kiriko no Yakusoku	Tsutako Takada	Episodes 30 and 31

TV Asahi

Year	Title	Role	Notes
1971	Daichūshingura	Okaru	
1973	Shinsho Taikōki	Nene	
1982	Seicho Matsumoto no Kurokawanotechō	Motoko Haraguchi	
1984	Getsuyō Wide Gekijō		
1986	The Hangman V		
1990	On'na Hangman		
1991	Kayō Mystery Gekijō		
1997	Kyoto no Geisha Bengoshi Jiken-bo	Eriko Fujinami	
1997	On'yado Kawasemi		
1998	Seizetsu! Yomeshūto Sensō Rasetsu no Ie	Ayano Ogura	
1999	Kasei-fu wa Mita!		
2000	2000-nen no Kanzen Hanzai ni Idomu Futarinoon'na		
2000	Nekketsu! Shūsaku ga Yuku		
2001	Hagure Keiji Junjō-ha		
2002	100 Oku no Akujo Futari		
2002	Kyōto Meikyū An'nai 4		Episode 9
2004	Seicho Matsumoto Kurokawanotechō	Akirako Iwamura	
2005	Shin Kasōken no Onna 2		
2007	Kyoto Satsujin An'nai		
2008	Puzzle		Episode 5
2010	100 no Shikaku o Motsu On'na	Eiko Takano	
2010	Misuterī Sakka Roku Nami ra Ikki No Suiri Hakkotsu no Goribu		
2010	Kyoto Chiken no On'na Dai 6 Series	Kikuko Hamada	Episode 1
2011	Sai Sōsa Keiji Yusuke Kataoka	Chitose Kogure	
2011	Tensai Keiji Noro Bon Roku	Sosei Rokuhana	
2012	Ikuzo Osaki no Jiken Sanpo	Yoshie Hamaguchi	
2012	Seinaru Kaibutsu-tachi	Hanko Hinata	Special appearance
2013	Hōigaku Kyōshitsu no Jiken File	Haruko Asakura	
2014	Keiji 110-kilo Dai 2 Series	Reika Kagami	Episode 4
2015	Kenji Yoko Asahina	Kimie Tashiro	

TV Tokyo

Year	Title	Role	Notes
1964	Shirobanba		
1970	Ano Musume ga ī na		
1975	Nokori no Yuki		
1987	Mikkoku		
1990	Tsuki Umaya Oen Jiken-chō		
1999	Wakaretara Sukinahito	Terumi Koizumi	
2001	Dangai		
2004	Ko Kyoto Hidatakayama Satsujin Jiken		
2013	Kaigo Helper Murasakiame-ko no Jiken-bo 2 Kako o Suteta Otoko	Fusako Narita	

=== Stage ===
Year	Title	Role	Notes
	Ohan		
	The Makioka Sisters		
	Like Asura		
	Ikite Iku Watashi		
	Hōrō-ki	Kyoko Hinatsu	
	Oshin		
	8 Women		
2012	Aru Jīsan ni Senkō o		
