= Hissatsu Shigotonin Gekitotsu =

Japanese TV drama series

- Also known as: 必殺仕事人・激突!
- Genre: Jidaigeki
- Directed by: Youichi Harada; Shigeru Ishihara
- Starring: Makoto Fujita; Kunihiko Mitamura; Sakae Takita; Yūki Meguro; Kin Sugai
- Music by: Masaaki Hiaro
- Country of origin: Japan
- Original language: Japanese
- No. of episodes: 21

Production
- Producers: Hisashi Yamauchi; Yozō Sakurai
- Running time: 45 minutes (per episode)
- Production companies: Asahi Broadcasting Corporation; Shochiku

Original release
- Network: ANN (ABC, TV Asahi)
- Release: October 8, 1991 – March 24, 1992

Hissatsu Shigotonin Gekitotsu (必殺仕事人・激突!) is a Japanese television jidaigeki or period drama that was broadcast from 1991 to 1992. It is the 30th in the Hissatsu series.

== Cast ==
- Makoto Fujita as Nakamura Mondo
- Kunihiko Mitamura as Hide
- Hashinosuke Nakamura as Yumeji
- Sakae Takita as Yamada Asaemon
- Wakako Sakai as Hatsuse
- Yūki Meguro as Narukawa
- Megumi Asaoka as Sada
- Kin Sugai as Nakamura Sen
- Mari Shiraki as Nakamura Ritsu
