= Hissastu Hashikakenin =

Japanese TV drama series

- Also known as: 必殺仕掛人
- Genre: Jidaigeki
- Directed by: Eiichi Kudo; Yoshiyuki Kuroda
- Starring: Masahiko Tsugawa; Shin Takuma; Hisako Manda; Midori Nishizaki
- Theme music composer: Masaaki Hirao
- Country of origin: Japan
- Original language: Japanese
- No. of episodes: 13

Production
- Producer: Hisashi Yamauchi
- Running time: 45 minutes (per episode)
- Production companies: Asahi, Shochiku

Original release
- Network: TV Asahi
- Release: August 2 – November 8, 1985

Hissastu Hashikakenin (必殺橋掛人) is a Japanese television jidaigeki or period drama that was broadcast in 1985. It is the 24th in the Hissatsu series. After appearing in several Hissatsu series as a guest villain actor, Masahiko Tsugawa won leading role in the Hissatsu series.

Ryūji used to be a famous professional killer but retired from it. His profession is a peddler (he sells kimono) now but one day he comes back from his retirement by his old friend's last words.

== Cast ==
- Masahiko Tsugawa: Ryūji
- Shin Takuma: Shinkichi
- Hisako Manda: Okura
- Machiko Washio : Ofuji
- Midori Nishizaki : Okō

== Directors ==
Eiichi Kudo directed episode 1,2,5
