= Legend of the Eight Samurai =

1983 film by Kinji Fukasaku

- Theatrical release poster
- Directed by: Kinji Fukasaku
- Written by: Toshio Kamata; Kinji Fukasaku
- Produced by: Haruki Kadokawa
- Starring: Hiroko Yakushimaru; Hiroyuki Sanada; Sonny Chiba
- Cinematography: Seizō Sengen
- Distributed by: Toei
- Release date: December 10, 1983 (Japan)
- Running time: 136 minutes
- Country: Japan
- Language: Japanese

Legend of the Eight Samurai (里見八犬伝, Satomi Hakken-den) is a 1983 Japanese fantasy film directed by Kinji Fukasaku. The script is adapted from Toshio Kamata's 1982 novel Shin Satomi Hakkenden (新・里見八犬伝), itself a loose reworking of the epic serial Nansō Satomi Hakkenden by Kyokutei Bakin.

== Synopsis ==
The story follows Princess Shizu (Hiroko Yakushimaru), her family slain and on the run from her enemies. As she escapes she is found by the vagabond Shinbei (Hiroyuki Sanada), before being rescued from her pursuers by Dōsetsu (Sonny Chiba). He tells her the legend of a curse on her family, and of eight beads that identify eight dog-warriors who can lift it, of which he and his companion are two. To defeat the evil queen Tamazusa (Mari Natsuki) who killed her family, they must find all eight. But Shinbei hears of Princess Shizu's identity, and vows to collect the reward for capturing her.

== Cast ==
- Hiroko Yakushimaru as Princess Shizu
- Hiroyuki Sanada as Inue Shinbei Masashi
- Sonny Chiba as Inuyama Dōsetsu Tadatomo
- Minori Terada as Inumura Daikaku Masanori
- Masaki Kyomoto as Inuzuka Shino Moritaka
- Etsuko Shihomi as Inusaka Keno Tanetomo
- Takuya Fukuhara as Inukawa Sōsuke Yoshitō
- Shunsuke Kariya as Inuta Kobungo Yasuyori
- Kenji Ohba as Inukai Genpachi Nobufuchi
- Keiko Matsuzaka as Princess Fuse
- Mari Natsuki as Tamazusa
- Yūki Meguro as Hikita Gonnokami Motofuji
- Nagare Hagiwara as Yōnosuke
- Mamako Yoneyama as Funamushi
- Akira Shioji as Genjin
- Tatsuo Endō as Mayuroku
- Nana Okada as Hamaji
- Akira Hamada as Akushirō

== Production ==
Legend of the Eight Samurai was influenced by Star Wars.

=== Adaptation ===
The film preserves little of the plot or characterization, and none of the feel of the Bakin original. Instead it builds on the basic template – collecting a band of warriors together to accomplish a task, better known from films such as Kurosawa's Seven Samurai. While some of the back story and key elements like the beads remain, even the eight dog brothers are substantially changed, to the extent of Keno's feminine disguise becoming actual womanhood.

=== Effects ===
Fantastical elements in the film are brought to life with a combination of props, wire work, and post-production special effects. The sequences were the work of the Tokusatsu Laboratory effects team, led by director Nobuo Yajima, who previously had worked on another adaptation of the Hakkenden story, Message From Space. Optical animation was handled by Toho Eizo Bijuitsu and Den Film Effect - the company co-founded by Toho and Tsuburaya alum Sadao Iizuka. The film version maintains the ero-guro elements of Kamata's book, including a nude blood-bathing rejuvenation scene.

=== Score ===
The colorful film score features a mixture of synthesizers and "real" strings produced by Nobody, and a couple of power ballads performed by John O'Banion: Satomi Hakkenden, composed by Joey Carbone and written by Kathi Pinto, and Hakkenshi no Tēma (White Light) (八剣士のテーマ), composed by Joey Carbone and Richie Zito, written by David Palmer. An LP of the music was released by Eastworld.

== Reception ==
Legend of the Eight Samurai was the number one Japanese film on the domestic market in 1984, earning ¥2.3 billion in distribution income.

The film was praised by Mark Woods in 2024.

=== Awards and nominations ===
The film won the silver prize at the 2nd Golden Gross Awards.

The film was nominated for the 8th Japan Academy Film Prize (awarded in 1985) for Director of the Year (Kinji Fukasaku), Outstanding Performance by an Actor in a Leading Role (Hiroyuki Sanada) and Outstanding Performance by an Actress in a Supporting Role (Mari Natsuki).

== Versions ==
Various English releases have been sold since the 1980s under the title Legend of the Eight Samurai, or Legend of Eight Samurai. An English dubbed version was released with some script modifications; and in 2005 an uncut, English subtitled version of the film was released. In 2012 the film was released on Blu-ray in Japan as part of the "Kadokawa Blu-ray Collection". In 2005, Digiview Entertainment released an English dub version of the film on DVD.

== See also ==
- Sorcerer's Orb, a 1954 adaptation
