= Hirotarō Honda =

Japanese actor (born 1951)

- 本田 博太郎
- Born: February 8, 1951 (age 75); Mito, Ibaraki Prefecture, Japan
- Education: Nihon University
- Occupations: Actor, Narrator
- Years active: 1975-present

Hirotarō Honda (本田 博太郎, Honda Hirotarō; born February 8, 1951) is a Japanese actor from Mito, Ibaraki Prefecture.

He started his acting career at the Bungakuza Theatre Company's acting school. His first film appearance was in the Nikkatsu Roman Porno film Sei to Ai no Korider in 1977.

== Filmography ==
=== Film ===
- Lost Chapter of Snow: Passion (1985)
- Shiki Natsuko (1980), Nakagaki
- Dixieland Daimyo (1986), Suzukawa Kadonosuke
- Sure Death 4: Revenge (1987), Sugie Iori
- Rainbow Kids (1991), Takano
- No Worries on the Recruit Front (1991)
- Lone Wolf and Cub: Final Conflict (1992), Samurai to be executed by Ogami Ittō
- Shall We Dance? (1996)
- Gamera: Guardian of the Universe (1995), Masaaki Saitō
- Lie Lie Lie (1997), Deputy Director Kaito
- Daikaijū Tōkyō ni arawaru (1998), Tsuguo Tadokoro
- Gamera 3: Revenge of Iris (1999), Masaaki Saitō
- Poppoya (1999), Miner
- Hissatsu! Shamisenya no Yuji (1999), Asakichi
- Dora-heita (2000), Denkichi
- Sennen no Koi Story of Genji (2001)
- Vengeance for Sale (2002), Hotta
- Dvilman (2004), Asuka
- Kamen Rider: The First (2005), The Private Secretary
- Yamato (2005), Rear Admiral Keizō Komura
- Kamen Rider Kabuto: God Speed Love (2006), Riku Kagami
- Oh! Oku (2006), Arai Hakuseki
- I Just Didn't Do It (2007)
- Heaven's Flower The Legend of Arcana (2011)
- Shield of Straw (2013)
- Kamen Rider × Super Sentai × Space Sheriff: Super Hero Taisen Z (2013), Strategist Raider
- Kikaider Reboot (2014), Sōgorō Honda
- Tōkyō Mukokuseki Shōjo (2015)
- Your Lie in April (2016)
- Alivehoon (2022), Ryūji Kasai
- The Broken Commandment (2022)
- Natchan's Little Secret (2023)
- The Legend and Butterfly (2023), Oda Nobuhide
- Salary Man Kintaro 2 (2025), Mita
- Samurai Vengeance (2026)

=== Television ===
- Taiyō ni Hoero! (1977, ep.282), (1979, ep.339)
- Daitokai Part II (1977) (ep.27)
- Hissatsu Shimainin (1981), Naojiro
- ShinHissatsu Shimainin (1982), Naojiro
- Tokugawa Ieyasu (1983), Honda Masazumi
- Sanada Taiheiki (1985), Asano Yoshinaga
- Byakkotai (1986), Sagawa Kanbei
- Tabaruzaka (1987), Sagawa Kanbei
- Nemuri Kyoshiro: Conspiracy at Edo Castle (1993), Mibu Chushō
- Kumokiri Nizaemon (1995), Kumagoro
- Kamen Rider Kabuto (2006), Riku Kagami
- Ryōmaden (2010), Kozone
- Man of Destiny (2012), Yasuhiro Sonegawa
- Burning Flower (2015), Tominaga Yūrin
- Naotora: The Lady Warlord (2017), Nakamura Yodayū
- Tengu no Daidokoro (2023), Rentarō Atago
- Baby Assassins Everyday! (2024), Yukio Miyahara
- Did Someone Happen to Mention Me? (2026)
