= Iron Maze =

1991 film directed by Hiroaki Yoshida

- Directed by: Hiroaki Yoshida
- Screenplay by: Tim Metcalfe
- Story by: Hiroaki Yoshida; Tim Metcalfe
- Based on: In a Grove by Ryūnosuke Akutagawa
- Starring: Jeff Fahey; Bridget Fonda; Hiroaki Murakami; J. T. Walsh
- Cinematography: Morio Saegusa
- Edited by: Bonnie Koehler
- Production companies: J&M Entertainment, Kitty Films, TYO Productions
- Release date: October 10, 1991
- Running time: 104 minutes
- Countries: Japan, United States
- Language: English
- Budget: $9 million

Iron Maze is a 1991 Japanese and American film directed by Hiroaki Yoshida and executive produced by Oliver Stone, starring Jeff Fahey, Bridget Fonda, Hiroaki Murakami, and J.T. Walsh.

Based on Ryūnosuke Akutagawa's story In a Grove (the same short story that was used for Kurosawa's Rashomon), this contemporary re-telling shifts the action to a Pennsylvania 'Rust Belt' town.

== Plot ==
The son of a Japanese billionaire is injured in an abandoned steel mill he bought in a Pennsylvania town. The police discover it might not be an accident when they start questioning the people in the town.

== Cast ==
- Jeff Fahey as Barry Mikowski
- Bridget Fonda as Chris Sugita
- Hiroaki Murakami as Junichi Sugita
- J.T. Walsh as Jack Ruhle
- Carmen Filpi as Charlie
- Gabriel Damon as Mikey

== Reception ==
Kevin Thomas of the Los Angeles Times called it "Rashomon in the Rust Belt". Vincent Canby of The New York Times said it was a "leading entry in the looniest movie of the year sweepstakes."
