= Hissatsu Watashinin =

Japanese TV drama series

- Also known as: 必殺渡し人
- Genre: Jidaigeki
- Directed by: Tokuzō Tanaka
- Starring: Masatoshi Nakamura; Mieko Takamine; Atsushi Watanabe
- Theme music composer: Masaaki Hirao
- Country of origin: Japan
- Original language: Japanese
- No. of episodes: 13

Production
- Producer: Hisashi Yamauchi
- Running time: 45 minutes (per episode)
- Production companies: Asahi, Shochiku

Original release
- Network: TV Asahi
- Release: July 8 – October 14, 1983

Hissatsu Watashinin (必殺渡し人) is a Japanese television jidaigeki or period drama that was broadcast in 1983. It is the 20th in the Hissatsu series. Atsushi Watanabe appeared in the Hissatsu series twice in past but in the drama he played professional killer for the first time.

== Cast ==
- Masatoshi Nakamura: Sota
- Mieko Takamine: Narutaki Shinobu
- Atsushi Watanabe: Daikichi
- Midori Nishizaki : Osawa
- Naomi Fujiyama : Onao
