= Hissatsu Shigotonin V Senpuhen =

Japanese TV drama series

- Also known as: 必殺仕事人V・旋風編
- Genre: Jidaigeki
- Directed by: Eiichi Kudo; Tokuzō Tanaka; Shigeru Ishihara
- Starring: Makoto Fujita; Hiroaki Murakami; Kin Sugai
- Theme music composer: Masaaki Hirao
- Country of origin: Japan
- Original language: Japanese
- No. of episodes: 14

Production
- Producers: Hisashi Yamauchi; Yozō Sakurai
- Running time: 45 minutes (per episode)
- Production companies: Asahi, Shochiku

Original release
- Network: TV Asahi
- Release: November 7, 1986 – March 6, 1987

Hissatsu Shigotonin V Senpuhen (必殺仕事人V・旋風編) is a Japanese television jidaigeki or period drama that was broadcast in 1987. It is the 27th in the Hissatsu series.

== Cast ==
- Makoto Fujita as Mondo Nakamura
- Hiroaki Murakami as Masa
- Hide Demon as Yotsuru no Ginppie
- Kazuko Kato as Benriya Otama
- Ippie Hikaru as Junnosuke Nishi
- Ken Nishida as Yoriki Onizuka
- Toshio Yamauchi as Tanaka sama
- Kin Sugai as Sen Nakamura
- Mari Shiraki as Ritsu Nakamura
