= Makoto Fujita =

Japanese actor (1933–2010)

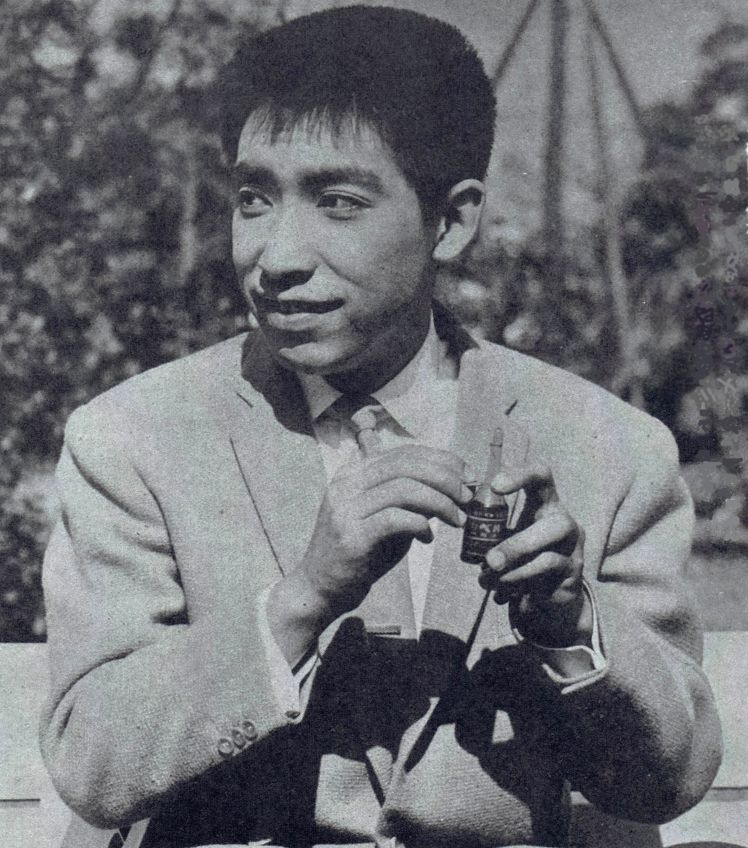
- Fujita in 1961
- Born: Makoto Harada; April 13, 1933; Ikebukuro, Toshima, Tokyo City, Tokyo Prefecture (now Tokyo), Empire of Japan)
- Died: February 17, 2010 (aged 76); Suita, Osaka, Japan
- Occupations: Actor, singer, comedian
- Years active: 1950–2010

Makoto Fujita (藤田まこと, Fujita Makoto), born Makoto Harada (April 13, 1933 – February 17, 2010), was a Japanese actor. He was born in Ikebukuro, Tokyo, the son of silent-film actor Rintarō Fujima, and started his career as a comedian in 1952.

== Acting Roles ==
Fujita appeared in both jidaigeki and contemporary roles. He starred as Nakamura Mondo, a samurai, in sixteen Hissatsu series on Asahi Broadcasting Corporation from 1973. He also portrayed Nakamura on stage and in film; for example, the 1984 film Hissatsu: Sure Death, the 1987 film Sure Death! Brown, You Bounder!, the (also released in 1987) film Sure Death 4: Revenge, the 1991 film Sure Death 5, and the 1996 film Hissatsu! Mondo Shisu. Fujita's last appearance was in 2009 Hissatsu Shigotonin 2009, although in January 2010 he had returned to the Hissatsu series as a narrator.

He also starred in the contemporary detective drama series Hagure Keiji Junjōha ("Rogue but Pure-Minded Detective"), also on the Asahi network.

Returning to jidaigeki he played the lead role in the remake of Kenkaku Shōbai with Megumi Ōji. He also took the role of Sen no Rikyū and in 2008 Tokugawa Mitsukuni.

Makoto's film credits number at least 57 and he also starred in a number of TV commercials.

== Singing and writing ==
Makoto's talents extended beyond acting. He also sang, and released nine recordings, including a duet with Azusa Mano, and with The Peanuts twins. He also published several essays, the last of which was Saigo (2006).

== Pacifism ==
A committed pacifist, Fujita always carried a letter from his elder brother, who died in the Battle of Okinawa during World War II. It took him over 60 years, Fujita revealed, before he could finally visit Okinawa, where he threw rice balls into the ocean as an offering to the war victims.

To convey his antiwar message, Fujita devoted all his energy into the 2007 movie Best Wishes for Tomorrow (Ashita he no Yuigon), in which he portrayed a class-B war criminal sentenced to death following Japan's surrender.

== Death ==
On February 16, 2010, at approximately 9:00 P.M. in his home in Minoh, Osaka, Fujita suddenly vomited blood and was transported to the Osaka University Hospital in Suita. The following day at 7:25 am, Fujita suffered an aortic aneurysm, resulting in his death. He was 76 years old.

== Honours ==
- Medal with Purple Ribbon (2002)

== Film ==
- Hymn to a Tired Man (1968)
- Hunter in the Dark (1979)
- Yaju-deka (1982)
- Hissatsu: Sure Death (1984)
- Hissatsu! III Ura ka Omote ka (1986)
- Sure Death 4: Revenge (1987)
- Hissatsu! Mondo Shisu (1996)
- Hissatsu! Shamisenya no Yuji (1999)
- Oh! Oku(2006)
- Best Wishes for Tomorrow(2008)

== Television ==
- Ten to Chito (1969) as Naya
- Shin Heike Monogatari (1972), Akehana no Banboku
- Kenkaku Shōbai (1998–2010)
- Ōoku (2004), Tokugawa Ieyasu
- Tokugawa Fūunroku Hachidai Shōgun Yoshimune (2008), Tokugawa Mitsukuni

=== Hissatsu series ===
- Hissatsu Shiokinin (1973) as Mondo Nakamura
- Kurayami Shitomenin (1974)
- Hissatsu Shiokiya Kagyō (1975)
- Hissatsu Shiwazanin (1976)
- Shin Hissatsu Shiokinin (1977)
- Edo Professional Hissatsu Shōbainin (1978)
- Hissatsu Shigotonin (1979–81)
- Shin Hissatsu Shigotonin (1981–82)
- Hissatsu Shigotonin III (1982–83)
- Hissatsu Shigotonin IV (1984)
- Hissatsu Shigotonin V (1985)
- Hissatsu Shigotonin V Gekitouhen (1985–86)
- Hissatsu Shigotonin V Senpuhen (1986–87)
- Hissatsu Shigotonin V Fuunryūkohen (1987)
- Hissatsu Shigotonin Gekitotsu (1991–92)
- Hissatsu Shigotonin 2009 (2009)
