= Hissatsu Shigotonin V Gekitouhen =

Japanese TV drama series

- Also known as: 必殺仕事人V・激闘編
- Genre: Jidaigeki
- Directed by: Eiichi Kudo; Tokuzo Tanaka
- Starring: Makoto Fujita; Masaki Kyomoto; Hiroaki Murakami; Izumi Ayukawa; Shōfukutei Tsurube II; Kin Sugai
- Country of origin: Japan
- Original language: Japanese
- No. of episodes: 33

Production
- Producer: Hisashi Yamauchi
- Running time: 45 minutes (per episode)
- Production companies: Asahi, Shochiku

Original release
- Network: TV Asahi
- Release: 1985 – 1986

Hissatsu Shigotonin V Gekitouhen (必殺仕事人V・激闘編) is a Japanese television jidaigeki or period drama that was broadcast in 1985 to 1986. It is the 25th in the Hissatsu series.

== Cast ==
- Makoto Fujita as Mondo Nakamura
- Masaki Kyomoto as Kumihimoya no Ryu
- Hiroaki Murakami as Kajiya no Masa
- Ayukawa Izumi as Nandemoya no Kayo
- Toshio Shiba as Ichi
- Tomio Umezawa as Ni
- Shōfukutei Tsurube II as San
- Kin Sugai as Sen Nakamura
- Mari Shiraki as Ritsu Nakamura
- Toshio Yamauchi as Tanaka sama
