= Hissatsu Shiokiya Kagyō =

- Also known as: 必殺仕置屋稼業
- Genre: Jidaigeki
- Directed by: Eiichi Kudo; Koreyoshi Kurahara; Tokuzō Tanaka
- Starring: Masaya Oki; Makoto Fujita; Katsutoshi Arata; Kin Sugai; Tamao Nakamura; Atsushi Watanabe
- Theme music composer: Masaaki Hirao
- Country of origin: Japan
- Original language: Japanese
- No. of episodes: 28

Production
- Producers: Hisashi Yamauchi; Rikyū Nakagawa
- Running time: 45 minutes (per episode)
- Production companies: Asahi Broadcasting Corporation; Shochiku

Original release
- Network: ANN (ABC, NET)
- Release: July 1975 – January 1976

Hissatsu Shiokiya Kagyō (必殺仕置屋稼業) is a Japanese television jidaigeki or period drama that was broadcast in 1975–1976. It is the 6th in the Hissatsu series. Kenji Misumi was hospitalized while directing episode 13 where he later died.

== Plot ==
Nakamura Mondo retired from professional killer's job but a woman(Okō) suddenly visits Mondo and urges him to withdraw his retirement. He refuses once but he finally decides to come back from his retirement.

Mondo coincidentally witnessed murder during his patrol. The man who committed murder was a lonely assassin, Ichimatsu. Ichimatsu is a bamboo craftsman but he is also a professional killer. Ichimatsu thought of killing Mondo because he was witnessed his murder by Mondo. One day Nakamura Mondo suddenly visits Ichimatsu to ask him to kill a man. In the final episode of Kurayami Shitomenin Itoi Mitsugu was killed so Mondo has been looking for someone. Ichimatsu and Mondo never trust each other but in the end they start killing villains together. Former monk Ingen also joins them and starts his career as a professional assassin.

== Cast ==
=== Shiokiya group ===
- Masaya Oki : Ichimatsu (He was raised by Tobitatsu who killed Ichimatsu's father.)
- Makoto Fujita : Nakamura Mondo
- Katsutoshi Arata : Ingen
- Atsushi Watanabe : Sutezō
- Tamao Nakamura : Okō (She runs a barber in Shintomicho.)

=== Mondo′s family ===
- Mari Shiraki : Ritsu Nakamura
- Kin Sugai : Sen Nakamura

=== People of Minami Machi Bugyosho ===
- Katsumi Munakata : Murano (Mondo's superior)
- Masao Komatsu : Kamekichi (Mondo's subordinate)

== Directors ==
- Koreyoshi Kurahara Episode1,6,7,12,15,18,28
- Kenji Misumi Episode13
- Eiichi Kudo Episode19
- Tokuzō Tanaka Episode24

== Episode list ==
Episode	Title	Directed by	Guest starrings	Original airdate
1	"Ippetsu Keijō Jigokuga Mieta"	Koreyoshi Kurahara	Masahiko Tanimura, Hitoshi Takagi	July 4, 1975
2	"Ippetsu Keijō Wanaga Mieta"	Akira Matsumoto	Masahiko Tsugawa	July 11, 1975
3	"Ippetsu Keijō Himoga Mieta"	Hiroki Matsuno	Akira Nakao, Ebata Takashi	July 18, 1975
4	"Ippetsu Keijō Shikakega Mieta"	Kuniya Ōkuma	Hideji Ōtaki, Keiko Takeshita, Gaku Yamamoto	July 25, 1975
5	"Ippetsu Keijō Yukiga Mieta"	Hiroki Matsuno	Nobuo Kawai, Kantarō Suga, Sayoko Ninomiya	August 1, 1975
6	"Ippetsu Keijō Onryōga Mieta"	Koreyoshi Kurahara	Koji Wada	August 8, 1975
7	"Ippetsu Keijō Jashinga Mieta"	Koreyoshi Kurahara	Kenji Imai	August 15, 1975
8	"Ippetsu Keijō Shōtaiga Mieta"	Kuniya Ōkuma	Kazuko Yoshiyuki, Kei Taguchi, Junkichi Orimoto, Jūkei Fujioka	August 22, 1975
9	"Ippetsu Keijō Gizenga Mieta"	Hiriki Matsuno	Minori Terada, Akio Hasegawa, Kyoko Tsuda	August 29, 1975
10	"Ippetsu Keijō Kankeiga Mieta"	Akira Matsumoto	Tadashi Yokouchi, Kriko Yumi, Takao Ito	September 5, 1975
11	"Ippetsu Keijō Akuyoga Mieta"	Hiroki Matsuno	Minoru Ōki, Sei Hiraizumi, Rumi Matsumoto, Shinobu Tsuruta	September 12, 1975
12	"Ippetsu Keijō Mashōga Mieta"	Koreyoshi Kurahara	Shin Kishida, Eri Nakagawa,	September 19, 1975
13	"Ippetsu Keijō Kakoga Mieta"	Kenji Misumi	Tatsuo Endo, Eiko Takehara	September 26, 1975
14	"Ippetsu Keijō Fugiga Mieta"	Hiroki Matsuno	Tsuyoshi Sasaki, Masakane Yonekura, Reiko Tajima	October 3, 1975
15	"Ippetsu Keijō Gimanga Mieta"	Koreyoshi Kurahara	Isuzu Yamada, Katsuhiko Watabiki, Takashi Toyama	October 10, 1975
16	"Ippetsu Keijō Muhōga Mieta"	Kuniya Ōkuma	Kantarō Suga, Yoko Akino, Takanobu Hozumi	October 17, 1975
17	"Ippetsu Keijō Urageiga Mieta"	Akira Matsumoto	Kōichi Kaminoyama, Torahiko Hamada	October 24, 1975
18	"Ippetsu Keijō Fujitsuga Mieta"	Koreyoshi Kurahara	Renji Ishibashi	October 31, 1975
19	"Ippetsu Keijō Gyōkuga Mieta"	Eiichi Kudo	Kei Satō, Masashi Ishibashi	November 7, 1975
20	"Ippetsu Keijō Tedarega Mieta"	Yusuke Watanabe	Atsuo Nakamura, Kai Atō, Eizō Kitamura	November 14, 1975
21	"Ippetsu Keijō Giyakumuga Mieta"	Kuniya Ōkuma	Takashi Shimura, Katsumasa Uchida	November 21, 1975
22	"Ippetsu Keijō Kyōgenga Mieta"	Hiroki Matsuno	Yoshio Inaba, Keizō Kanie, Yuko Ozeki	November 28, 1975
23	"Ippetsu Keijō Boketsuga Mieta"	Hiroki Matsuno	Rokkō Toura, Kyōko Yoshizawa,	December 5, 1975
24	"Ippetsu Keijō Ketsuenga Mieta"	Tokuzō Tanaka	Akio Hasegawa	December 12, 1975
25	"Ippetsu Keijō Furinga Mieta"	Kuniya Ōkuma	Etsuko Ichihara, Minori Terada	December 19, 1975
26	"Ippetsu Keijō Kyōhakuga Mieta"	Hiroki Matsuno	Rinichi Yamamoto	December 26, 1975
27	"Ippetsu Keijō Ōokuga Mieta"	Yūsuke Watanabe	Keiko Takeshita, Shūko Honami	January 2, 1976
28	"Ippetsu Keijō Hōkaiga Mieta"	Koreyoshi Kurahara	Hideo Kanze, Takeshi Obayashi	January 9, 1976

== See also ==
- Hissatsu Shikakenin (First in the Hissatsu series)
- Hissatsu Shiokinin (2nd in the Hissatsu series)
- Shin Hissatsu Shiokinin (10th in the Hissatsu series)
