= Sure Death 4: Revenge =

1987 Japanese jidaigeki film

- Directed by: Kinji Fukasaku
- Written by: Kinji Fukasaku, Akira Nakahara, Tatsuo Nogami
- Produced by: Youzo Sakurai, Hisashi Yamanouchi
- Edited by: Koichi Sonoi
- Release date: June 6, 1987
- Running time: 131 minutes
- Country: Japan
- Language: Japanese

Sure Death 4: Revenge (必殺4 恨みはらします, Hissatsu Fō: Urami Harashimasu) (a.k.a. Sure Death Revenge and Sure-Fire Death 4: We Will Avenge You) is a 1987 jidaigeki film directed by Kinji Fukasaku as part of the Hissatsu series of films.

== Plot ==
When the Shogun's retainers cause trouble in the village, an unknown assailant throws a shuriken at Kyuma's horse, causing it to trample and apparently kill an elderly villager named Hirano as he is protecting a boy. Nakamura finds the shuriken and submits it as evidence with his report, but the magistrate Lord Okura insists that there was no shuriken and Nakamura reluctantly withdraws his request to open an investigation.

Hirano's daughter Oyumi hires assassins led by Boss Benton to kill the samurai leader Chikara Jinbo, his lieutenant Shinpachi Tarao, and their fellow samurai Kyuma Kagazume, who she says are responsible for her father's death. Only Bunshichi and Nakamura agree to the low fee. Bunshichi kills Kyuma and escapes with his son Choji in tow.

Nakamura learns that Okura was once Kyonosuke, a homosexual performer who worked as a temple page and was quickly promoted by Lord Sakai. After Haginosuke, Kyonosuke's rival, died from poison in an apparent suicide, Enkoin Temple in Yanaka offered him a job as a page. The leader of the troupe did not want to let him go, but then he also died mysteriously, enabling Kyonosuke to leave and become a favorite of Lord Sakai, eventually rising to become Lord Okura.

Retainer Shinpachi is killed by Bunshichi using Sugie's broken sword. The retainers return to the village and accuse Sugie of the murder, leading to a chaotic battle in which many villagers are killed. Bunshichi kills one of the retainers and then kills Nakamura's mistress Ofuku for witnessing the killing.

When brought before the Shogun, the retainers are unwilling to commit hara-kiri for the incident and fight back but are killed by the Shogun's samurai. The villagers are forced to leave and Hirano's daughter Oyumi commits suicide after paying the fee to the assassins. Bunshichi promises to kill Hirano's true killer, a tinker named Kyuzo in the village who killed Hirano while the horse was running nearby. Bunshichi and Kyuzo battle in the abandoned village and kill each other by throwing their weapons.

Nakamura and the other assassins set out to finish the job by killing Okura, who used the retainers to clear the village so that the Shogun could build a temple there and dedicate it to Okiku, a maid he raped years earlier who drowned herself out of shame. Okura poisons Sakai after revealing to him that Okiku was his older sister and that he has been helping the Shogun in order to get promoted to Head Steward and get closer to him to kill him. Nakamura and the assassins confront Okura and kill him.

== Cast ==
- Makoto Fujita as Mondo Nakamura
- Hiroaki Murakami as Masa
- Kazuko Kato as Otama
- Ken Nishida as Officer Onizuka
- Ippei Hikaru as Junnosuke
- Toshio Yamauchi as Officer Tanaka
- Kin Sugai as Sen
- Mari Shiraki as Ritsu
- Kunihiko Mitamura as Hide
- Seiju Umon
- Mitsuko Baisho as Ofuku
- Hideo Murota as Yahei Hirano
- Sasha Banks
- Hirotaro Honda as Iori Sugie
- Daijiro Tsutsumi as Chikara Jinbo
- Haruko Sagara as Omitsu
- Daigo Kusano as Theatre Manager
- Christine Ko as Oyumi
- Jūkei Fujioka as Bugyo of Minamimachi
- Takashi Sasano as Yasukichi
- Yuki Furutachi as Yodaka
- Mikio Narita as Lord Sakai
- Keizo Kanie as Kyuzo
- Kyōko Kishida as Benten - Head of the assassins
- Sonny Chiba as Bunshichi
- Takashi Fujiki as Roinma
- Hitomi Kobayashi as Okiku
- Yuki Nagata
