= Atsushi Watanabe (actor, born 1947) =

Japanese actor

- Born: 28 November 1947 (age 78); Ibaragi, Japan
- Occupation: Actor
- Years active: 1960–present

Atsushi Watanabe (Japanese: 渡辺篤史, Hepburn: Atsushi Watanabe; born 28 November 1947, in Ibaragi) is a Japanese actor. Watanabe has been hosting a report-type programme "Watanabe Atsushi no Tatemono Tanbō" on TV Asahi since 1989.

== Selected filmography ==
=== Films ===
- Saigono Tokotai (1970)
- New Abashiri Prison (1970)
- Bakumatsu (1973)
- The Burmese Harp (1985)
- The Million Ryo Pot (2004)

=== Television Drama ===
- The Water Margin (1973),
- Shinsho Taikōki (1973),
- Unmeitōge (1974)
- Hissatsu Shiokiya Kagyō (1975)
- Hissatsu Shiwazanin (1976)
- Oretachi wa Tenshi da! (1979)
- Shin Edo no Kaze (1980)
- Edo no Asayake (1980)
- Tokugawa Ieyasu (Taiga drama) (1983)
- Hissatsu Watashinin (1984)
- Tokusō Saizensen (1985–87)
- The Unfettered Shogun4 (1991–92)

=== Other Television appearances ===
- Watanabe Atsushi no Tatemono Tanbō (1989 – present)
