= Yūki Meguro =

Japanese actor

- Born: 15 August 1947 (age 79); Tokyo, Japan
- Occupations: Actor, singer
- Years active: 1952–60, 1968-present

Yūki Meguro (Japanese: 目黒祐樹) is a Japanese actor. He is the son of jidaigeki actor Jūshirō Konoe and had an older brother Hiroki Matsukata. He was nominated for a Primetime Emmy Award for Outstanding Supporting Actor in a Limited Series or a Special for his work in Shōgun in 1981.

== Filmography ==
=== Film ===
- Karei-naru Ichizoku (1974) as Ginpei Manpyo
- Lupin III: Strange Psychokinetic Strategy (1974) as Arsène Lupin III
- Legend of the Eight Samurai (1983)
- Baby Elephant Story: The Angel Who Descended to Earth (1986)
- Orochi, the Eight-Headed Dragon (1994)
- Musashi (2019)

=== Television ===
- Kunitori Monogatari (1973) as Maeda Toshiie
- The Yagyu Conspiracy (1978) as Samon Tomonori Yagyū
- Akō Rōshi (1979) as Uesugi Noritsuna
- Shōgun (1980) as Omi
- Papa wa Newscaster (1987) as Hyuga
- Hissatsu Shigotonin Gekitotsu (1991) as Narikawa
- Come Come Everybody (2022) as Old Isamu Kijima
