= Mie Nakao =

Japanese actress and singer (born 1946)

Mie Nakao (Japanese: 中尾 ミエ; born 6 June 1946 in Kokura) is a Japanese actress and singer. With Yukari Itō and Mari Sono she co-starred in the hit 1963 teen movie Hai, Hai Sannin Musume ("Yes, Yes, The Three Girls"). The three actresses became the latest incarnation of the long-running series of "Three Girls" acts during the 1950s, 60s and 70s, under their manager Watanabe as the Watanabe-Pro Sannin musume (渡辺プロ三人娘). Nakao has continued to appear on television and produce music.

Nakao debuted as a singer at the age of 16. In May 1962, her debut single was "Kawaii Baby" (可愛いベイビー), a cover of the song "Pretty Little Baby" by Connie Francis (from the 1962 album Connie Francis Sings "Second Hand Love"), was released. The song sold over a million copies.

== Filmography ==
- Hissatsu Hitchū Shigotoya Kagyō (1975)
- Hissatsu Shiwazanin (1976)
- Shin Hissatsu Shiokinin (1977)
- A Stitch of Life (2015)
- Encanto (2021) – Abuela Alma Madrigal (Japanese voice)
- The Grimm Variations (2024)
- Hoshi no Kyoshitsu (2026)
- Akiramemasen! (2027), Misao Ichikawa
