= Hissatsu! Mondo Shisu =

1996 film directed by Masahisa Sadanaga

- Film poster
- Directed by: Masahisa Sadanaga
- Written by: Tsuyoshi Yoshida
- Starring: Makoto Fujita; Kunihiko Mitamura; Kiyoshi Nakajō; Masahiko Tsugawa; Akira Takarada
- Music by: Masaaki Hirao
- Production company: Shôchiku Eiga
- Release date: May 25, 1996 (Japan)
- Running time: 100 minutes
- Country: Japan
- Language: Japanese

Hissatsu! Mondo Shisu (Japanese: 必殺! 主水死す THE HISSATSU), also known as Sure Death 6, is a 1996 Japanese film based on the jidaigeki Hissatsu television series. The film depicts popular character Nakamura Mondo's death. Mondo is involved in the Tokugawa Shogunate's conflict.

== Cast ==
- Makoto Fujita as Mondo Nakamura
- Kunihiko Mitamura as Hide
- Kiyoshi Nakajō as Yuji
- Chizuru Azuma as Okei
- Kin Sugai as Sen Nakamura
- Mari Shiraki as Ritsu Nakamura
- Masahiko Tsugawa as Seikichi
- Yuko Natori as Oyume
- Akira Takarada as Mizuno Tadakuni
- Seijun Suzuki as Hokusai
