= Tasukenin Hashiru =

- Also known as: 助け人走る
- Genre: Jidaigeki
- Directed by: Eiichi Kudo; Koreyoshi Kurahara; Tokuzō Tanaka
- Starring: Takahiro Tamura; Ichirō Nakatani; So Yamamura; Hiroshi Miyauchi; Yumiko Nogawa
- Theme music composer: Masaaki Hirao
- Ending theme: "Bōkyō no Tabi" was sung by Morimoto Tarō to Superstar
- Country of origin: Japan
- Original language: Japanese
- No. of episodes: 36

Production
- Producers: Hisashi Yamauchi; Rikyū Nakagawa
- Running time: 45 minutes (per episode)
- Production companies: Asahi Broadcasting Corporation; Shochiku

Original release
- Network: JNN (ABC, TBS)
- Release: November 1973 – June 1974

Tasukenin Hashiru (助け人走る) is a Japanese television jidaigeki or period drama, that was broadcast in 1973–1974. It is the third in the Hissatsu series and is based on Saga Sen's Seibei-ryū Gokui.

== Plot ==
Seibie used to be a famous bandit. Now Seibie's official job is an employment agency but also he takes charge of killing villains with money. Seibie's targets are always villains who escape justice despite their crimes.

Skilled swordsman Nakayama Bunjuro and Tsji Heinai work for him. At first Ryu tries to kill Seibie but he also starts working for him.

== Cast ==
- Takahiro Tamura as Nakayama Bunjurō
- Ichirō Nakatani as Tsuji Heinai
- Sō Yamamura as Daiku no Seibe
- Hiroshi Miyauchi as Ryu (From episode 20)
- Yumiko Nogawa as Okichi
- Masahiro Sumiyoshi as Tamekichi
- Masaaki Tsusaka as Rikichi
- Atsuko Sano as Nakayama Shino

== Directors ==
- Koreyoshi Kurahara Episode1,6,13,14,21,22,35,36
- Kenji Misumi Episode3,7,8,12,33
- Eiichi Kudo Episode4,11,29,30
- Tokuzō Tanaka Episode18,19,23,24,28,31,34

== See also ==
- Hissatsu Shikakenin (First in the Hissatsu series)
- Hissatsu Shiokinin (2nd in the Hissatsu series)
- Hissatsu Shiokiya Kagyō (6th in the Hissatsu series)
- Shin Hissatsu Shiokinin (10th in the Hissatsu series)
