= Hissatsu Shigotonin III =

Japanese television program

- Also known as: 必殺仕事人III
- Genre: Jidaigeki
- Directed by: Masahiro Sadakata; Tokuzō Tanaka
- Starring: Makoto Fujita; Kunihiko Mitamura; Kiyoshi Nakajō; Izumi Ayukawa; Isuzu Yamada; Kin Sugai
- Country of origin: Japan
- Original language: Japanese
- No. of episodes: 38

Production
- Producers: Hisashi Yamauchi; Rikyū Nakagawa
- Running time: 45 minutes (per episode)
- Production companies: Asahi, Shochiku

Original release
- Network: TV Asahi
- Release: 1982 – 1983

Hissatsu Shigotonin III (必殺仕事人III) is a Japanese television jidaigeki or period drama that was broadcast in 1982 to 1983. It is the 19th in the Hissatsu series. The drama is a sequel to Shin Hissatsu Shigotonin.

== Cast ==
- Makoto Fujita as Mondo Nakamura
- Kunihiko Mitamura as Kazarishokunin no Hide
- Kiyoshi Nakajō as Shamisenya no Yuji
- Izumi Ayukawa as Nandemoya no Kayo
- Ippei Hikaru as Junnosuke Nishi
- Isuzu Yamada as Oriku
- Kin Sugai as Sen Nakamura
- Mari Shiraki as Ritsu Nakamura
- Toshio Yamauchi as Chief Constable (Hittōdōshin) Kumagorō Tanaka
