= Edo Professional Hissatsu Shōbainin =

- Also known as: 江戸プロフェショナル 必殺商売人
- Genre: Jidaigeki
- Directed by: Eiichi Kudo; Shigeru Ishihara
- Starring: Makoto Fujita; Mitsuko Kusabue; Tatsuo Umemiya; Shōhei Hino; Kin Sugai; Mari Siraki
- Ending theme: Yumenn naka sang by Akira Kobayashi
- Country of origin: Japan
- Original language: Japanese
- No. of episodes: 26

Production
- Producers: Hisashi Yamauchi; Rikyū Nakagawa
- Running time: 45 minutes (per episode)
- Production companies: Asahi Broadcasting Corporation; Shochiku

Original release
- Network: ANN (ABC, TV Asahi)
- Release: 1978 – 1978

Edo Professional Hissatsu Shōbainin (江戸プロフェショナル 必殺商売人, Edo Purofeshonaru Hissatsu Shōbainin) is a Japanese television jidaigeki or period drama that was broadcast in 1978. It is the 11th in the Hissatsu series. The drama is a sequel to Shin Hissatsu Shiokinin. Mitsuko Kusabue plays same role as she played in Hissatsu Hitchū Shigotoya Kagyō.

== Plot ==
Osie and Sinji are former couple but they are still killing villains with money together.

== Cast ==
- Makoto Fujita as Nakamura Mondo
- Tatsuo Umemiya as Shinji
- Mitsuko Kusabue as Osei
- Shōhei Hino as Shōuhachi
- Izumi Ayukawa
- Mari Shiraki as Nakamura Ritsu
- Kin Sugai as Nakamura Sen
