= Hissatsu Shikakenin =

Japanese TV drama

- Also known as: 必殺仕掛人
- Genre: Jidaigeki
- Directed by: Kinji Fukasaku; Kenji Misumi
- Starring: Ken Ogata; Yoichi Hayashi; So Yamamura; Tamao Nakamura; Yumiko Nogawa
- Theme music composer: Masaaki Hirao
- Ending theme: "Koya no Hateni" was sung by Yuzo Yamashita
- Country of origin: Japan
- Original language: Japanese
- No. of episodes: 33

Production
- Producers: Hisashi Yamauchi; Rikyū Nakagawa
- Running time: 45 minutes (per episode)
- Production companies: Asahi Broadcasting Corporation; Shochiku

Original release
- Network: JNN (ABC, TBS)
- Release: September 1972 – April 1973

Hissatsu Shikakenin (必殺仕掛人) is a Japanese television jidaigeki or period drama that was broadcast in 1972–1973. It was the first in the Hissatsu series and is based on Shōtarō Ikenami's novel Shiokinin Fujieda Baian. Ken Ogata played Fujieda Baian.

Episode 1,2 and 24 were directed by Kinji Fukasaku.

== Plot ==
Otowaya's official job is an employment agency but also he takes charge of killing villains with money. Otowaya's targets are always villains who escape justice despite their crimes. Fujieda Baian is a doctor but also a professional killer who works for Boss Otowaya in the Edo Underworld.

Nishimura Sanai is a ronin. One day Otowaya Hanemon hires him as a professional killer and he starts working for Otowaya as well as Baian. Baian and Sanai help each other to kill villains.

== Cast ==
- Ken Ogata: Fujieda Baian
- Yoichi Hayashi: Nishimura Sanai
- So Yamamura: Otowaya Hanemon
- Tamao Nakamura: Okura (Hanemon's wife)
- Yumiko Nogawa: Gin
- Rumi Matsumoto: Nishimura Miyo (Nishimura Sanaie's wife)
- Masaaki Tsusaka: Misaki no Senzō
- Hiroyuki Ota : Mankichi
- Takahiro Tamura: Kamiya episode 21,31

== Directors ==
- Kinji Fukasaku Episode1,2,24
- Kenji Misumi Episode3,4,9,12,21,33
- Kazuo Hase Episode18,22,26,29,31

== Films ==
- Hissatsu Shikakenin (必殺仕掛人) (1973) Directed by Yousuke Watanabe, screenplay by Yousuke Watanabe and Tetsuro Abe (running time 87 minutes)
  - Jiro Tamiya as Fujieda Baian
  - Koji Takahashi as Nishimura Sanai
  - So Yamamura as Otowaya Hanemon
  - Masaaki Tsusaka as Misaki no Senzo
  - Yoko Nogiwa as Kichi
  - Tamio Kawachi as Mogohachi
- Hissatsu Shikakenin Baian Arijigoku (必殺仕掛人 梅安蟻地獄) (1973) Directed by Yousuke Watanabe, screenplay by Ichiro Miyagawa (running time 91 minutes)
  - Ken Ogata as Fujieda Baian
  - Yoichi Hayashi as Kosugi Jugoro
  - So Yamamura as Otowaya Hanemon
  - Masaaki Tsusaka as Misaki no Senzo
  - Kei Satō as Izuya Choubei
  - Kayo Matsuo as Rin
  - Asao Koike as Yamazaki Sohaku
- Hissatsu Shikakenin Shunsetsu shikakebari (必殺仕掛人 春雪仕掛針) (1974) Directed by Masahiro Sadakata, screenplay by Tetsuro Abe (running time 89 minutes)
  - Ken Ogata as Fujieda Baian
  - Yoichi Hayashi as Kosugi Jugoro
  - So Yamamura as Otowaya Hanemon
  - Shima Iwashita as Chiyo
  - Isao Natsuyagi as Katsushiro
  - Takeo Chii
  - Kunio Murai

== See also ==
- Hissatsu Shiokinin (2nd in the Hissatsu series)
- Tasukenin Hashiru (3rd in the Hissatsu series)
- Hissatsu Shiokiya Kagyō (6th in the Hissatsu series)
- Shin Hissatsu Shiokinin (10th in the Hissatsu series)
