= Shin Hissatsu Shiokinin =

- Also known as: 新・必殺仕置人
- Genre: Jidaigeki
- Directed by: Eiichi Kudo
- Starring: Makoto Fujita; Tsutomu Yamazaki; Katsuo Nakamura; Shôhei Hino; Fumio Fujimura
- Theme music composer: Masaaki Hirao
- Ending theme: "Akanegumo" was sung by Tomoko Kawada.
- Country of origin: Japan
- Original language: Japanese
- No. of episodes: 41

Production
- Producers: Hisashi Yamauchi; Rikyū Nakagawa
- Running time: 45 minutes (per episode)
- Production companies: Asahi Broadcasting Corporation; Shochiku

Original release
- Network: ANN (ABC, TV Asahi)
- Release: January 1977 – November 1977

Shin Hissatsu Shiokinin (新・必殺仕置人) is a Japanese jidaigeki or period television drama. It is the tenth in the Hissatsu series. The drama is a sequel to Hissatsu Shiokinin. Shin Hissatsu Shiokinin is one of the most popular Jidaigeki dramas in Japan. Former professional Baseball player Fumio Fujimura made his first appearance as an actor.

== Plot ==
In the final episode of Hissatsu Shiokinin, Nenbutsu no Tetsu left Edo but he returned and became a member of Tora no kai.

One day he is surprised that Nakamura Mondo's name was mentioned and that he was targeted for murder in Tora no kai. Tetsu breaks the rule of Tora no kai and helps Mondo. Tetsu and Mondo reunite for the first time in four years. They start killing villains again under the rule of Tora no Kai.

== Cast ==
=== Shiokinin group ===
- Makoto Fujita: Nakamura Mondo is a dōshin(Policeman of edo period) but he is also professional killer who takes charge of killing bad people with money. He hides his master level sword skills under a mask of incompetence and buffoonery.
- Tsutomu Yamazaki: Nenbutsu no Tetsu is a former monk but now he is a chiropractor, but he is also a professional killer. He uses his extremely tough fingers to dislocate the ribs of his targets. In some episodes he uses his skills as a chiropractor to cripple targets.
- Katsuo Nakamura: Miyomatsu is a tinker but he is also aprofessional killer.
- Shōhei Hino: Shōuhachi. He returns in Edo Professional Hissatsu Shōbainin.
- Mie Nakao: Otei

=== Tora no kai ===
- Fumio Fujimura: Motojime Tora, Tora is boss of Tora no Kai. He seldom kills villains by himself but sometimes he does. He uses baseball bat to kill villains.
- Kenzo Kawarazaki: Shinigami, Motojime Tora's subordinate

=== Mondo's family ===
- Kin Sugai: Nakamura Sen
- Mari Shiraki: Nakamura Ritsu

== Directors ==
- Eiichi Kudo Episode1,2,5,19,27,36,39
- Youichi Harada Episode34,38,41

== See also ==
- Hissatsu Shikakenin (First in the Hissatsu series)
- Hissatsu Shiokinin (2nd in the Hissatsu series)
- Tasukenin Hashiru (3rd in the Hissatsu series)
- Hissatsu Shiokiya Kagyō (6th in the Hissatsu series)
