= Hissatsu Shiokinin =

- Also known as: 必殺仕置人
- Genre: Jidaigeki
- Directed by: Eiichi Kudo; Kenji Misumi; Tokuzō Tanaka
- Starring: Tsutomu Yamazaki; Makoto Fujita; Masaya Oki; Kin Sugai; Yumiko Nogawa
- Theme music composer: Masaaki Hirao
- Country of origin: Japan
- Original language: Japanese
- No. of episodes: 26

Production
- Producers: Hisashi Yamauchi; Rikyū Nakagawa
- Running time: 45 minutes (per episode)
- Production companies: Asahi Broadcasting Corporation; Shochiku

Original release
- Network: JNN (ABC, TBS)
- Release: April 1973 – October 1973

Hissatsu Shiokinin (必殺仕置人) is a Japanese television jidaigeki or period drama that was broadcast in 1973. It is the 2nd in the Hissatsu series. Hissatsu Shiokinin is one of the most popular jidaigeki dramas in Japan.

== Plot ==
A group of merchants in Edo city (Tokyo) in the mid-1800s is actually a band of assassins available for hire. Each assassin has his own killing style. People of Edo city called them Shiokinin.

== Cast ==
=== Shiokinin group ===
- Nenbutsu no Tetsu: (Tsutomu Yamazaki) is a former monk but now he is a chiropractor, but he is also a professional killer. He uses his extremely tough fingers to dislocate the ribs of his targets. In some episodes he uses his skills as a chiropractor to cripple targets. Tetsu returns in Shin Hissatsu Shiokinin in 1977.
- Mondo Nakamura: (Makoto Fujita) is a dōshin (Policeman of Edo period) but he is also professional killer who takes charge of killing bad people with money. He hides his master level sword skills under a mask of incompetence and buffoonery.
- Kanoke no Joe: (Masaya Oki) is a Coffin craftsman but he is also professional killer. Joe is a master of the Okinawan martial arts and his weapon of choice is a spear shaped chisel. Joe returns in special drama Hissatsu Shigotonin Daishugō (1982) and Hissatsu Shigotonin ahensensō ni iku (1983).
- Ohirome no Hanji : Masaaki Tsusaka
- Okin: Yumiko Nogawa
- Tenji no Koroku: Hideo Takamatsu

=== Mondo's Family ===
- Nakamura Ritsu : Mari Shiraki (Mondo Nakamura's Wife)
- Nakamura Sen : Kin Sugai (Mondo Nakamura's mother-in-law)

== Directors ==
- Eiichi Kudo Episode7,12,16,25,26
- Kenji Misumi Episode4
- Koreyoshi Kurahara Episode15,19
- Tokuzō Tanaka Episode20

== See also ==
- Hissatsu Shikakenin (First in the Hissatsu series)
- Tasukenin Hashiru (3rd in the Hissatsu series)
- Hissatsu Shiokiya Kagyō(6th in the Hissatsu series)
- Shin Hissatsu Shiokinin (10st in the Hissatsu series)
