= Hissatsu Shigotonin =

Japanese TV drama series

- Also known as: 必殺仕事人
- Genre: Jidaigeki
- Directed by: Eiichi Kudo; Tokuzō Tanaka
- Starring: Makoto Fujita; Kunihiko Mitamura; Goro Ibuki; Izumi Ayukawa; Isuzu Yamada; Kin Sugai
- Country of origin: Japan
- Original language: Japanese
- No. of episodes: 84

Production
- Producers: Hisashi Yamauchi; Rikyū Nakagawa
- Running time: 45 minutes (per episode)
- Production companies: Asahi Broadcasting Corporation; Shochiku

Original release
- Network: ANN (ABC, TV Asahi)
- Release: 1979 – 1981

Hissatsu Shigotonin (必殺仕事人) is a Japanese television jidaigeki or period drama, that was broadcast from 1979 to 1981. It is the 15th in the Hissatsu series. The drama was set to end after episode 26 with Nakamura Mondo's death, but won great popularity so the broadcast period was extended.

== Plot ==
Nakamura Mondo was relegated to a post in Hachioji from the Minamimachi Bugyōsho and he has retired from being a professional assassin. But one day he was ordered to return to the Minamimachi Bugyōsho. Shikazō worked behind the scenes to get Mondo back to the Minamimachi Bugyōsho. Shikazō asks Nakamura Mondo to kill a man, Mondo initially refuses but he is blinded by big money and eventually takes the offer. Mondo restarts killing villains again with Kazarishokunin no Hide and Nawate Samon.

== Cast ==
- Makoto Fujita as Mondo Nakamura
- Kunihiko Mitamura as Kazarishokunin no Hide, a craftsman but also professional assassin.
- Goro Ibuki as Nawate Samon, a ronin.
- Izumi Ayukawa as Kayo
- Yuriko Mishima as Oshima
- Takao Yamada as Hankichi
- Isuzu Yamada as Otowa
- Ganjirō Nakamura as Motojime Shikazō, the boss of Shigotonin team.
- Kin Sugai as Sen Nakamura
- Mari Shiraki as Ritsu Nakamura
