= Kin Sugai =

Japanese actress (1926–2018)

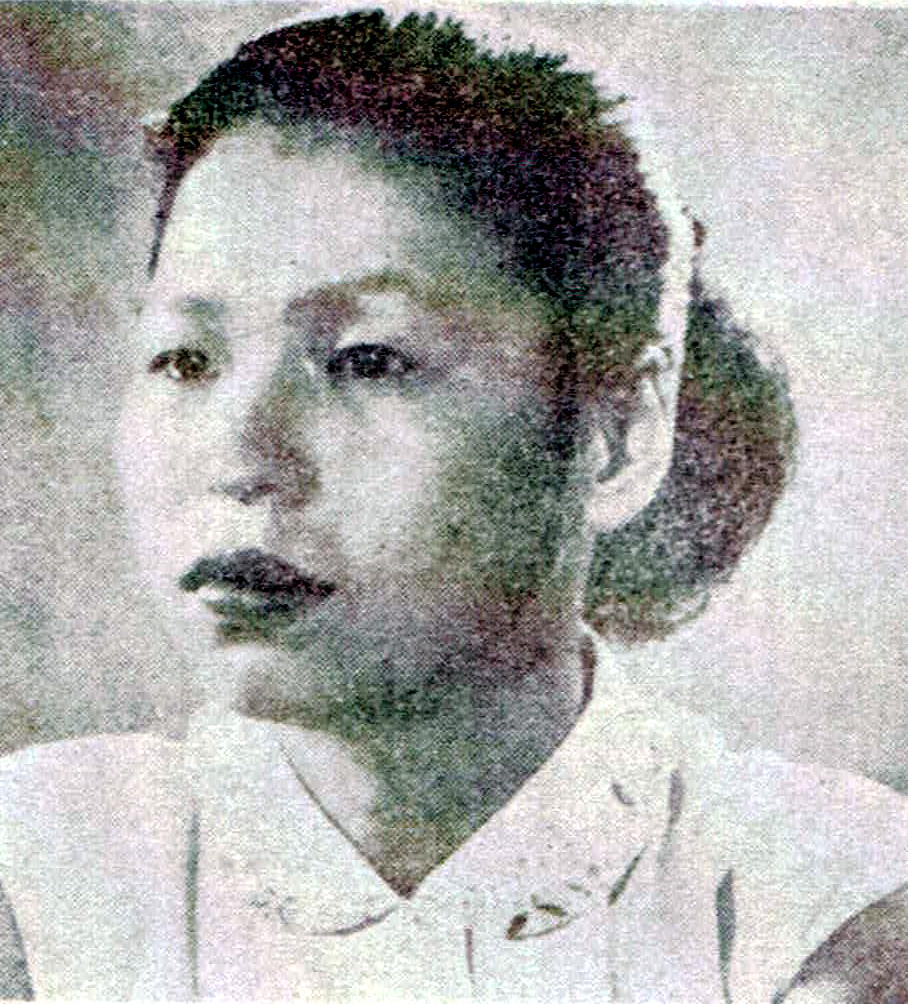
- Born: 28 February 1926; Tokyo, Japan
- Died: 10 August 2018 (aged 92); Tokyo, Japan
- Occupation: Actress
- Years active: 1951–2010

Kin Sugai (菅井きん, Sugai Kin) (28 February 1926 – 10 August 2018) was a Japanese actress. She won the award for best supporting actress at the 9th Hochi Film Award for The Funeral. Sugai is famous for her role as Sen Nakamura in the jidaigeki drama Hissatsu series.

She won the Best Supporting Actress award at the 8th Japan Academy Film Prize for her role in The Funeral. In 2008, she landed lead role for the first time in the Hideo Sakai film ぼくのおばあちゃん (Hepburn: Boku no Obaachan) at the age of 82, and was certified as Guinness as "the world's oldest movie starring actress".

== Filmography ==
Film

Year	Title	Role	Notes
1952	Ikiru	Housewife	
1954	Godzilla	Ozawa	
1955	Ai no onimotsu		
1955	Wolf		
1956	Godzilla, King of the Monsters!		Uncredited
1957	Sun in the Last Days of the Shogunate	Okuma	
1957	Kuroi kawa		
1958	Onna de aru koto	Yoshiko	
1958	Stakeout	Mrs. Shimooka	
1958	Stolen Desire	Osen Yamamura	
1958	Tsuzurikata kyodai	Toki Kawahara	
1959	Karatachi nikki		
1959	Dansei shiikuhô		
1959	Ningen no kabe		
1960	Haru no yume	Tetsu	
1960	When a Woman Ascends the Stairs		
1960	Kuroi hanabira		
1960	Kuroi gashû: Aru sarariman no shôgen		
1960	Shiroi gake		
1960	Robo no ishi	Akitaro And Kinu's Mother	
1960	Daigaku no sanzôkutachi	Madam at General store	
1960	The Bad Sleep Well	Tomoko Wada	
1960	Autumn Has Already Started	The Aunt	
1960	'Akasaka no shimai' yori: yoru no hada	Okin Yoshikawa	
1961	Pigs and Battleships	Haruko's mother	
1961	A Soldier's Prayer	Dôro no Hinanmin	
1961	Wakai ôkami	Yoshiko Kawamoto	
1961	Minami no kaze to nami	Matsuyo	
1961	Wakarete ikiru toki mo		
1961	Koi no gashû		
1961	Daigaku no wakadaishô		
1961	Kusa wo karu musume	Chie	
1961	Girls of the Night		
1961	Keishichô monogatari: jûni-nin no keiji	Ume Shinohara	
1961	Gen to fudômyô-ô		
1961	Hadakakko	Okimi	
1962	Gan no tera	Kan Horinouchi	
1962	Karami-ai		
1962	Musume to watashi	Nun	
1962	Foundry Town	Miyo	
1962	Kigeki ekimae onsen		
1962	Hôrô-ki		
1962	Burari Bura-bura Monogatari		
1962	Futari de aruita iku haru aki	Mrs. Mochizuki	
1962	Varan the Unbelievable	Medium	
1963	High and Low	Female Drug Addict	
1963	Tokyo aantachibiru: dasso	Saku, Kirinoe's mother	
1963	Ame no naka ni kiete	Chiyo Takahata	
1963	Shiro to kuro		
1963	Shitamachi no taiyô	Nobue	
1963	Tokubetsu kidô sôsatai: Tokyo eki ni harikome	Sada	
1963	Gendaikko	Masako	
1963	Hiken		
1963	Onna no rekishi	Tsune (Nobuko's mother)	
1964	Ware hitotsubu no mugi naredo		
1964	Kwaidan	Village woman	(segment "Yuki-Onna")
1965	Red Beard	Chôji's Mother	
1965	Miseinen - Zoku cupola no aru machi	Miyo Kanayama	
1965	Kemonomichi		
1965	Hana no o-Edo no hôkaibô	Okuma	
1965	An Innocent Witch	Kikuno	
1966	The Pornographers		
1966	Dark the Mountain Snow		
1967	Zoku izuko e	Torako	
1967	Sasori		
1967	Moero! Taiyô		
1968	Meguri-ai	Kiyo Etô	
1968	Fushin no toki	Yamakawa	
1968	Kokosei geisha	Toki Kajiwara	
1968	The Human Bullet		
1968	I, the Executioner	Misa	
1969	Yotarô senki	Head Nurse Kanzaki	
1969	Konto 55go: Jinrui no daijakuten		
1969	Dai Nippon suri shûdan		
1970	Beast Capital		
1970	Mujô	mother	
1970	Dodes'ka-den	Okuni	
1971	Maboroshi no satsui		
1972	The Long Darkness	Wellwisher on train	
1972	Kuro no honryu	Toku Sugiyama	
1972	Hito-kiri Yota: Kyoken San-kyodai		
1973	Sukeban: Kankain dassô		
1973	Nihon kyôka den	Okin	
1974	Castle of Sand	Yamashita	
1974	Sandakan No. 8	Woman came back from Penang	
1974	New Battles Without Honor and Humanity	Tadashi's mother	
1975	Kobe Kokusai Gang	Chiyo	
1975	Zesshô	Servant	
1977	Mount Hakkoda		
1977	Edogawa Rampo no injû		
1977	Godzilla		Uncredited
1978	Oyomeni yukimasu	Mineko	
1979	Vengeance Is Mine	Defendant's mother	
1979	Gassan	Kane	
1981	Hono-o no gotoku		
1981	Willful Murder	Fusa	
1984	Jo no mai	Asa	
1984	The Funeral	Kikue Amamiya	
1985	Kanashii kibun de joke	Primary school teacher	
1985	Hissatsu! Buraun-kan no kaibutsutachi	Sen	
1985	Fire Festival	Tatsuo's Mother	
1985	Usugeshô	Toyo	
1986	Uemura Naomi monogatari	Yoshi Ogawa	
1986	Hissatsu! III Ura ka Omote ka	Sen	
1987	Sure Death 4: Revenge	Sen	
1987	Hachiko Monogatari	Owner's wife at inn	
1988	Chichi	Matsu	
1990	Tales of a Golden Geisha	Foster mother	
1990	Suki!		
1991	Kamigata Kugaizoshi		
1991	Kojika monogatari	Kana Osaki	
1991	Chōshōjo Reiko	Mitsurei Kurou, Reiko's Grandmother	
1991	Shimanto-gawa	Haru	
1994	Ie naki ko		
1995	Deep River	Tsukada's wife	
1996	Hissatsu! Mondo Shisu	Sen Nakamura	
1997	Kikansha sensei		Voice
1999	Ano natsu no hi	Yuta's grandmother	
1999	Sentakuki wa ore ni makasero	Old lady	
2001	Kewaishi	Tome	
2003	Tegami	Izumi Sugino	
2004	Riyû	Taeko Katakura	
2007	Kiiroi namida	Yone	
2010	Matataki	Old woman	
2010	Haru's Journey	Keiko Kanemoto	
2014	Trick The Movie: Last Stage		

=== Television ===
- Hissatsu series
  - Hissatsu Shiokinin (1973) as Sen Nakamura
  - Kurayami Shitomenin (1974) as Sen Nakamura
  - Hissatsu Shiokiya Kagyō (1975–1976) as Sen Nakamura
  - Shin Hissatsu Shiokinin (1977) as Sen Nakamura
  - Edo Professional Hissatsu Shōbainin (1978) as Sen Nakamura
  - Hissatsu Shigotonin (1979–1981) as Sen Nakamura
  - Shin Hissatsu Shigotonin (1981–1982) as Sen Nakamura
  - Hissatsu Shigotonin III (1982–1983) as Sen Nakamura
  - Hissatsu Shigotonin V Gekitouhen (1985–1986) as Sen Nakamura
  - Hissatsu Shigotonin V Senpuhen (1986–1987) as Sen Nakamura
  - Hissatsu Shigotonin V Fuunryūkohen (1987) as Sen Nakamura
  - Hissatsu Shigotonin Gekitotsu (1991–1992) as Sen Nakamura
- Taiyo ni Hoero! (1973–1974) as Taki Shibata
- The Water Margin (1973)
- Uchi no Ko ni Kagitte... (1985) Teacher Aramaki
- Kōmyō ga Tsuji (2006) as Naka

== Honours ==
- Medal with Purple Ribbon (1990)
- Order of the Precious Crown, 4th Class, Wisteria (1996)
