= Eiichi Kudo =

Japanese film director (1929–2000)

- Born: 17 July 1929; Tomakomai, Hokkaido, Japan
- Died: 23 September 2000 (aged 71); Kyoto, Japan
- Occupation: Film director
- Years active: 1956-1998

Eiichi Kudo (工藤 栄一, Kudō Eiichi; 17 July 1929 – 23 September 2000) was a Japanese film director. Kudo directed 30 films between 1956 and 1998, the most notable being 13 Assassins (1963) and The Great Killing (1964). He joined the Toei film company in 1952 and made his film director debut with Fukaku hichō in 1959. His 1982 film Yaju-deka was entered into the 33rd Berlin International Film Festival.

Kudo directed many television dramas, notably more than 50 episodes of the popular television jidaigeki Hissatsu series.

He died of intracerebral hemorrhage on September 23, 2000.

== Filmography ==
- Fukaku hichō (1959)
- Fukaku hichō: kanketsuhen (1959)
- Jirochō kesshōki: Akiba no taiketsu (1960)
- Jirochō kesshōki: Nagurikomi dōchū (1960)
- Hebigami maden (1960)
- Hibari torimonochō: orizuru kago (1960)
- Jirochō kesshōki: Fujimitōge no taiketsu (1960)
- Jirochō kesshōki: Nagurikomi kōjinyama (1960)
- Heavenly Dragon (1960)
- Flowers on the Road (1961)
- Woman of the Ghostly Lantern (1961)
- The Foreign Shark (1961)
- Kashi no onna Ishimatsu (1961)
- Hakko ryukitai (1961)
- Revenge for His Lover (1962)
- 13 Assassins (1963)
- Castle of Owls (1963)
- The Great Killing (1964)
- Yakuza G-men: Meiji ankokugai (1965)
- Convicted Woman (1966)
- Eleven Samurai (1967)
- Nihon ānkokushi: chī no koso (1967)
- Sangyo supai (1968)
- Nippon ankokushi: nasake muyō (1968)
- The Fort of Death (1969)
- Yakuza tai G-men (1973)
- Mamushi no kyōdai: Futari awasete sanjuppan (1974)
- Aftermath of Battles Without Honor and Humanity (1979)
- Kage no Gundan: Hattori Hanzo (1980)
- Yokohama BJ Blues (1981)
- Yaju-deka (1982)
- Nogare no machi (1983)
- Ansatsu shirei (1984)
- Love Letter (1985) (actor only)
- Sure Death 3 (1986)
- Chronicle of the Town Magistrate (1987)
- Takasebune (1988)
- Water Moon (1989)
- Nakibokuro (1991)
- Bloody Passion (1992)
- Ring! Ring! Ring! The Champion Belt of Tears (1993)
- Gunro no keifu (1998)

== Television ==
- Hissatsu series
  - Hissatsu Shiokinin (1972) episodes 7, 12, 16, 25, and 26
  - Tasukenin Hashiru (1973–74) episodes 4, 11, 29, and 30
  - Kurayami Shitomenin (1974)
  - Hissatsu Karakurinin (1975)
  - Hissatsu Karakurinin Keppūhen (1976) episodes 2and 3
  - Shin Hissatsu Shiokinin (1977) episodes 1, 2, 5, 19, 27, 36, and 39
  - Edo Professional Hissatsu Shōbainin (1978) episodes 1, 2, and 26
  - Hissastu Hashikakenin (1985) episodes 1, 2, and 5
- Tsūkai! Kōchiyama Sōshun (1975–76)
- Fûfu tabi nikki saraba ronin (1976)
- Shi no dangai (TV movie) (1982)
- Sengoku Ransei no Abarenbo Saito Dosan Doto no Tenka Tori (TV movie) (1991)
- Taira no Kiyomori (TV movie) (1992)
- Shinsengumi Keppū Roku (1998) episode 1
- Kagemusha Tokugawa Ieyasu (TV miniseries) (1998)
