= List of films set during the Sengoku and Azuchi–Momoyama periods =

Below is an incomplete list of feature films, television films or television series which include events of the Sengoku and Azuchi–Momoyama periods. This list does not include documentaries, short films.

== 1930s ==
Year	Country	Main title (Alternative title)	Original title (Original script)	Director	Subject
1930	Empire of Japan	Ranmaru Mori	森蘭丸	Tetsuroku Hoshi	Mori Ranmaru
1931	Empire of Japan	The 26 Martyrs of Japan	殉教血史 日本二十六聖人	Tomiyasu Ikeda	26 Martyrs of Japan
1935	Empire of Japan	Rare Story of the Era of the Warring States: The Whimsical Youth	戦国奇譚 気まぐれ冠者	Mansaku Itami	Drama.
1935	Empire of Japan	Taikoki: The Story of Tokichirō the Runner	太閤記 藤吉郎走卒の巻	Eisuke Takizawa	Based on the novel Shinsho Taikoki. Toyotomi Hideyoshi
1936	Empire of Japan	Taikoki: Fujikichiro's career advancement volume	太閤記 藤吉郎出世飛躍の巻	Shintaro Watanabe	Based on the novel Shinsho Taikoki. Toyotomi Hideyoshi
1936	Empire of Japan	Miyamoto Musashi: The Earth	宮本武蔵 地の巻	Eisuke Takizawa	Based on the novel Musashi. Miyamoto Musashi
1937	Empire of Japan	Miyamoto Musashi: Wind Scroll	宮本武蔵 風の巻	Tamizō Ishida	Based on the novel Musashi. Miyamoto Musashi
1937	Empire of Japan	Miyamoto Musashi: Wind Scroll	宮本武蔵 風の巻	Jun Ozaki	Based on the novel Musashi. Miyamoto Musashi
1938	Empire of Japan	The Tale of the Successful Taiko	出世太閤記	Hiroshi Inagaki	Based on the novel Shinsho Taikoki. Toyotomi Hideyoshi

== 1940s ==
Year	Country	Main title (Alternative title)	Original title (Original script)	Director	Subject
1940	Empire of Japan	Miyamoto Musashi Part 1: Pioneers	宮本武蔵 第一部 草分けの人々	Hiroshi Inagaki	Based on the novel Musashi. Miyamoto Musashi
1940	Empire of Japan	Miyamoto Musashi Part 2: The Gate of Success	宮本武蔵 第二部 栄達の門	Hiroshi Inagaki	Based on the novel Musashi. Miyamoto Musashi
1940	Empire of Japan	Miyamoto Musashi Part 3: Kenshin's Path	宮本武蔵 第三部 剣心一路	Hiroshi Inagaki	Based on the novel Musashi. Miyamoto Musashi
1940	Empire of Japan	Oda Nobunaga	織田信長	Masahiro Makino	Oda Nobunaga
1942	Empire of Japan	Miyamoto Musashi Ichijoji Duel	宮本武蔵 一乗寺決闘	Hiroshi Inagaki	Based on the novel Musashi. Miyamoto Musashi
1942	Empire of Japan	The Hawk of the North	獨眼龍政宗	Hiroshi Inagaki	Biography, Drama, History. Based on the novel Little Dictator. Date Masamune
1942	Empire of Japan	Miyamoto Musashi: The Battle of Hannyazaka	宮本武蔵 決戦般若坂	Kozo Saeki	Based on the novel Musashi. Miyamoto Musashi
1943	Empire of Japan	Miyamoto Musashi: Awakening to Dual Sword Style	宮本武蔵 二刀流開眼	Daisuke Itō	Based on the novel Musashi. Miyamoto Musashi
1943	Empire of Japan	Miyamoto Musashi Duel at Hannyazaka	宮本武蔵 決闘般若坂	Daisuke Itō	Based on the novel Musashi. Miyamoto Musashi
1945	Empire of Japan	The Tale of the Bridegroom Taiko	花婿太閤記	Santarô Marune	Based on the novel Shinsho Taikoki. Toyotomi Hideyoshi

== 1950s ==
Year	Country	Main title (Alternative title)	Original title (Original script)	Director	Subject
1952	Japan	Shinshu Tenmakyo	神州天馬侠	Katsuhiko Tasaka	Based on the novel Shinshu Tenmakyo.
1952	Japan	Sword for Hire	戦国無頼	Hiroshi Inagaki	Action, Drama, Adventure. Based on the novel Sengoku Burai.
1953	Japan	New Book Taikoki: The Wandering Hiyoshimaru	新書太閤記 流転日吉丸	Ryō Hagiwara	Based on the novel Shinsho Taikoki. Toyotomi Hideyoshi
1953	Japan	New Book Taikoki: Sudden Attack on Okehazama	新書太閤記 急襲桶狭間	Sadatsugu Matsuda	Based on the novel Shinsho Taikoki. Toyotomi Hideyoshi
1953	Japan	Uneven Taikoki	凸凹太閤記	Bin Kato	Based on the novel Shinsho Taikoki. Toyotomi Hideyoshi
1954	Japan	Sanada Ten Braves Ninjutsu Sarutobi Sasuke Ninjutsu Kirigakure Saizo Ninjutsu Skills Comparison	真田十勇士 忍術猿飛佐助 忍術霧隠才蔵 忍術腕くらべ	Toshikazu Kôno	Sanada Ten Braves
1954	Japan	Shinshu Tenmakyo Part 1 Inamaru Takeda	神州天馬侠 第一部 武田伊奈丸	Akira Hagiwara	Based on the novel Shinshu Tenmakyo.
1954	Japan	Seven Samurai	七人の侍	Akira Kurosawa	Action, Drama.
1954	Japan	Samurai I: Musashi Miyamoto	宮本武蔵	Hiroshi Inagaki	Action, Adventure, Biography, Drama, History, Romance. Based on the novel Musashi. Miyamoto Musashi
1954	Japan	New Nations Story: Red Peacock: Nachi's Little Tengu	新諸国物語 紅孔雀:那智の小天狗	Ryô Hagiwara	Based on the novel Red Peacock.
1955	Japan	Tenheidoji Part 1 Young Samurai of Waves	天兵童子 第一篇 波濤の若武者	Kokichi Uchide	Based on the novel Tenpeidoji.
1955	Japan	Tenpei Doji, Part 2: The Secret Envoy of Takamatsu Castle	天兵童子 第二篇 高松城の密使	Kokichi Uchide	Based on the novel Tenpeidoji.
1955	Japan	Tenheidoji Final Chapter Hinomaru First Battle	天兵童子 完結篇 日の丸初陣	Kokichi Uchide	Based on the novel Tenpeidoji.
1955	Japan	Red-faced young warrior Oda Nobunaga	紅顔の若武者 織田信長	Toshikazu Kôno	Adventure, Biography, Drama. Based on the novel Oda Nobunaga. Oda Nobunaga
1955	Japan	Samurai II: Duel at Ichijoji Temple	続宮本武蔵 一乗寺の決闘	Hiroshi Inagaki	Action, Adventure, Biography. Based on the novel Musashi. Miyamoto Musashi
1955	Japan	Shinshu Tenmakyo Part 2 Genjutsu Hyakki	神州天馬侠 第二部 幻術百鬼	Akira Hagiwara	Based on the novel Shinshu Tenmakyo.
1955	Japan	Shinshu Tenmakyo Part 3 Fire Sesame Water Sesame	神州天馬侠 第三部 火ごま水ごま	Akira Hagiwara	Based on the novel Shinshu Tenmakyo.
1955	Japan	Shinshu Tenmakyo Part 4 Tenchihen	神州天馬侠 第四部 天動地変	Akira Hagiwara	Based on the novel Shinshu Tenmakyo.
1955	Japan	New Nations Story: Red Peacock: The Cursed Magic Flute	新諸国物語 紅孔雀:呪いの魔笛	Ryô Hagiwara	Based on the novel Red Peacock.
1955	Japan	New Nations Story: Red Peacock: White Bone Castle on the Moon	新諸国物語 紅孔雀:月の白骨城	Ryô Hagiwara	Based on the novel Red Peacock.
1955	Japan	New Nations Story: Red Peacock: Kenbaku Ukinemaru	新諸国物語 紅孔雀:剣盲浮寝丸	Ryô Hagiwara	Based on the novel Red Peacock.
1955	Japan	New Nations Story: Red Peacock: Treasure of the Ruins	新諸国物語 紅孔雀:廃墟の秘宝	Ryô Hagiwara	Based on the novel Red Peacock.
1956	Japan	Samurai III: Duel at Ganryu Island	宮本武蔵完結編 決闘巌流島	Hiroshi Inagaki	Action, Adventure, Drama, Romance. Based on the novel Musashi. Miyamoto Musashi
1957	Japan	Fengyun suddenly becomes Osaka Castle, Ten Warriors of Sanada	風雲急なり大阪城 真田十勇士総進軍	Nobuo Nakagawa	Sanada Ten Braves
1957	Japan	Throne of Blood	蜘蛛巣城	Akira Kurosawa	Drama. Based on the play Macbeth.
1958	Japan	Taikoki	太閤記	Tatsuo Ōsone	Based on the novel Shinsho Taikoki. Toyotomi Hideyoshi
1958	Japan	Shinshu Tenmakyo	神州天馬侠	Hideaki Ônishi	Based on the novel Shinshu Tenmakyo.
1958	Japan	The Hidden Fortress	隠し砦の三悪人	Akira Kurosawa	Action, Adventure, Drama.
1958	Japan	Shinshu Tenmakyo Final Edition	神州天馬侠 完結篇	Hideaki Onishi	Based on the novel Shinshu Tenmakyo.
1959	Japan	Hawk of the North	独眼竜政宗	Toshikazu Kôno	Action, Biography, Drama, History. Date Masamune
1959	Japan	Young Nobunaga	若き日の信長	Kazuo Mori	Based on kabuki Nobunaga in his younger days. Oda Nobunaga
1959	Japan	Fuunji Oda Nobunaga	風雲児 織田信長	Toshikazu Kôno	Drama, History. Oda Nobunaga
1959	Japan	Life of an Expert Swordsman	或る剣豪の生涯	Hiroshi Inagaki	Action, Drama, Romance. Based on the play Cyrano de Bergerac.

== 1960s ==
Year	Country	Main title (Alternative title)	Original title (Original script)	Director	Subject
1960	Japan	Alcohol, women and spears	酒と女と槍	Tomu Uchida	Drama, History, Romance, War. Based on the novel Alcohol, Women and Spears.
1960	Japan	The enemy is at Honnoji Temple	敵は本能寺にあり	Tatsuo Osone	Biography, Drama, History. Oda Nobunaga, Akechi Mitsuhide
1960	Japan	Wind Boy Fuun Nijigaya	風小僧 風雲虹ヶ谷		Based on the novel Red Peacock.
1960	Japan	Wind Boy Furyu Kappa Sword	風小僧 風流河童剣		Based on the novel Red Peacock.
1960	Japan	Wind Boy Meteor Sword Dance	風小僧 流星剣の舞		Based on the novel Red Peacock.
1960	Japan	The River Fuefuki	笛吹川	Keisuke Kinoshita	Drama, History, War. Based on the novel Fuefuki River.
1961	Japan	Bandits on the Wind	野盗風の中を走る	Hiroshi Inagaki	Drama.
1961	Japan	Zen and Sword	宮本武蔵	Tomu Uchida	Action, Drama, History. Based on the novel Musashi. Miyamoto Musashi
1961	Japan	Wind, clouds and fortress	風と雲と砦	Kazuo Mori	Based on the novel Wind, Clouds and Fortress.
1961	Japan	The Conspirator	反逆児	Daisuke Itō	Action, Drama. Based on kabuki Tsukiyamadono Shimatsu.
1962	Japan	Miyamoto Musashi II: Duel at Hannya Hill	宮本武蔵 般若坂の決斗	Tomu Uchida	Drama. Based on the novel Musashi. Miyamoto Musashi
1962	Japan	Ninja, a Band of Assassins	忍びの者	Satsuo Yamamoto	Action, Drama. Based on the Shinobi no Mono novels.
1962	Japan	Love Under the Crucifix	お吟さま	Kinuyo Tanaka	Drama. Based on the novel Ogin-sama. Sen no Rikyū, Justo Takayama
1963	Japan	Two-Sword Fencing Is Born	宮本武蔵 二刀流開眼	Tomu Uchida	Drama. Based on the novel Musashi. Miyamoto Musashi
1963	Japan	The Third Shadow	第三の影武者	Umetsugu Inoue	Action, Drama. Based on the novel The Third Double.
1963	Japan	Castle of Owls	忍者秘帖 梟の城	Eiichi Kudo	Action, Drama. Based on the novel Fukurō no Shiro.
1963	Japan	Shinobi No Mono 2: Vengeance	続・忍びの者	Satsuo Yamamoto	Action, Drama. Based on the Shinobi no Mono novels.
1963	Japan	Shinobi No Mono 3: Resurrection	新・忍びの者	Kazuo Mori	Drama, Crime, Action. Based on the Shinobi no Mono novels.
1963	Japan	Warring Clans	戦国野郎	Kihachi Okamoto	Adventure, Drama.
1964	Japan	Miyamoto Musashi: The Duel at Ichijoji	宮本武蔵 一乗寺の決斗	Tomu Uchida	Action, Drama. Based on the novel Musashi. Miyamoto Musashi
1964	Japan	Ninja law breaking special	忍法破り 必殺	Meijiro Umezu	
1964	Japan	Horafuki Taikoki	ホラ吹き太閤記	Kengo Furusawa	Based on the novel Shinsho Taikoki. Toyotomi Hideyoshi
1965	Japan	Miyamoto Musashi V: Duel at Ganryu Island	宮本武蔵 巌流島の決斗	Tomu Uchida	Action, Drama. Based on the novel Musashi. Miyamoto Musashi
1965	Japan	Tokugawa Ieyasu	徳川家康	Daisuke Itō	Biography, Drama. Based on the novel Tokugawa Ieyasu. Tokugawa Ieyasu
1965	Japan	Taking The Castle	城取り	Toshio Masuda	Action, History, War. Based on the novel Taking the Castle.
1965	Japan	Samurai Spy	異聞猿飛佐助	Masahiro Shinoda	Action, Drama. Based on the novel The Alternative Story of Sarutobi Sasuke.
1966	Japan	Shinobi No Mono 8	新書・忍びの者	Kazuo Ikehiro	Action, Drama. Based on the Shinobi no Mono novels.
1968	Japan	The Saga of Tanegashima	鉄砲伝来記	Kazuo Mori	Drama. Yaita Kinbei, Wakasa
1969	Japan	Samurai Banners	風林火山	Hiroshi Inagaki	Action, Adventure, Drama, History, War. Based on the novel Fuurinkazan. Yamamoto Kansuke, Takeda Shingen
1969	Japan	Butt-talking Magoichi	尻啖え孫市	Kenji Misumi	Action. Based on the novel Butt-talking Magoichi. Suzuki Magoichi

== 1970s ==
Year	Country	Main title (Alternative title)	Original title (Original script)	Director	Subject
1970	Japan	Mission: Iron Castle	忍びの衆	Kazuo Mori	Action, Drama. Based on the Shinobi no Mono novels.
1971	Japan	Miyamoto Musashi VI	真剣勝負	Tomu Uchida	Action, Drama. Based on the novel Musashi. Miyamoto Musashi, Shishido
1972	Japan	Naked Seven	戦国ロック 疾風の女たち	Yasuharu Hasebe	Action, Drama, Thriller.
1973	Japan	Musashi Miyamoto	宮本武蔵	Tai Kato	Action, Drama. Based on the novel Musashi. Miyamoto Musashi
1978	Japan	Lady Ogin	お吟さま	Kei Kumai	Drama. Based on the novel Ogin-sama. Sen no Rikyū, Justo Takayama
1979	Japan	The Shogun Assassins	真田幸村の謀略	Sadao Nakajima	Action, Drama. Tokugawa Ieyasu, Sanada Ten Braves

== 1980s ==
Year	Country	Main title (Alternative title)	Original title (Original script)	Director	Subject
1980	Japan; United States	Shadow Warrior	影武者	Akira Kurosawa	Drama, History, War. Takeda Shingen
1980	Japan	Shogun's Ninja	忍者武芸帖 百地三太夫	Norifumi Suzuki	Action, Adventure, Drama.
1981	Japan	Manzai Taikoki	マンザイ太閤記	Takaharu Sawada; Hideo Takayashiki	Based on the novel Shinsho Taikoki. Toyotomi Hideyoshi
1985	Japan; France	Ran	乱	Akira Kurosawa	Action, Drama, War. Based on the tragedy King Lear. Based on the document Letter of Instruction to Three Children.
1989	Japan	Death of a Tea Master	千利休 本覺坊遺文	Kei Kumai	Biography, Drama, History. Based on the novel The Remains of Honkakubo. Sen no Rikyū, Oda Nagamasu
1989	Japan	Rikyu	利休	Hiroshi Teshigahara	Biography, Drama, History. Based on the novel Hideyoshi and Rikyu. Sen no Rikyū

== 1990s ==
Year	Country	Main title (Alternative title)	Original title (Original script)	Director	Subject
1990	Japan	Heaven and Earth	天と地と	Haruki Kadokawa	Action, Adventure, Drama, War. Based on the novel Heaven and Earth. Uesugi Kenshin
1992	Japan	Princess Goh	豪姫	Hiroshi Teshigahara	Drama, History. Based on the novel Princess Gohime. Gōhime
1992	Japan	Adventure Roman	東方見聞録	Kazuyuki Izutsu	Action, Drama.
1996	Japan	Movie Nintama Rantaro	映画 忍たま乱太郎	Tsutomu Shibayama; Tsuneo Kobayashi	Animation, Action, Adventure, Comedy, Family. Based on the anime Nintama Rantarō.
1999	Japan	Owls' Castle	梟の城	Masahiro Shinoda	Action, Drama. Based on the novel Fukurō no Shiro.

== 2000s ==
Year	Country	Main title (Alternative title)	Original title (Original script)	Director	Subject
2001	Japan	Red Shadow	赤影	Hiroyuki Nakano	Action, Adventure, Comedy. Based on the manga Ninja Akakage.
2002	Japan	Crayon Shin-chan: Fierceness That Invites Storm! The Battle of the Warring States	クレヨンしんちゃん 嵐を呼ぶ アッパレ!戦国大合戦	Keiichi Hara	Animation, History. Based on the manga Crayon Shin-chan.
2002	Japan	Inuyasha the Movie: The Castle Beyond the Looking Glass	映画犬夜叉 鏡の中の夢幻城	Toshiya Shinohara	Animation, Action, Comedy, Romance. Based on the manga Inuyasha.
2004	Japan	Inuyasha the Movie: Fire on the Mystic Island	映画犬夜叉 紅蓮の蓬莱島	Toshiya Shinohara	Animation, Action, Adventure, Comedy. Based on the manga Inuyasha.
2005	Japan	Tensho Iga Rebellion	天正伊賀の乱	Seiji Chiba	First Tenshō Iga War
2007	Japan	Chacha: The Princess of Heaven	茶々 天涯の貴妃	Hajime Hashimoto	Drama, History. Based on the novel Yodo's Diary. Yodo-dono
2007	Japan	Sword of the Stranger	ストレンヂア 無皇刃譚	Masahiro Andō	Animation, Action, Adventure.
2008	Japan	Hidden Fortress: The Last Princess	隠し砦の三悪人	Shinji Higuchi	Action, Adventure, Drama. Remake of The Hidden Fortress.
2009	Japan	Goemon	五右衛門	Kazuaki Kiriya	Action, Drama, History. Ishikawa Goemon
2009	Japan	Ballad	BALLAD 名もなき恋のうた	Takashi Yamazaki	Action, Drama, Romance.
2009	Japan	Castle Under Fiery Skies	火天の城	Mitsutoshi Tanaka	Drama, History. Based on the novel Castle of Fire and Heaven. Azuchi Castle

== 2010s ==
Year	Country	Main title (Alternative title)	Original title (Original script)	Director	Subject
2011	Japan	Anime movie Nintama Rantaro Ninjutsu Academy Everyone is on the move!	劇場版アニメ 忍たま乱太郎 忍術学園 全員出動!の段	Masaya Fujimori	Animation. Based on the manga Rakudai Ninja Rantarō. Based on the anime Nintama Rantarō.
2011	Japan	Ninja Kids!!!	忍たま乱太郎	Takashi Miike	Action, Adventure, Comedy. Based on the manga Rakudai Ninja Rantarō. Based on the anime Nintama Rantarō.
2011	Japan; United States	Sengoku Basara: The Last Party	劇場版 戦国	Kazuya Nomura	Animation, Action, Adventure, History. Based on the game series Sengoku Basara.
2012	Japan	The Floating Castle	のぼうの城	Shinji Higuchi	Comedy, Drama, History. Based on the novel Nobou's Castle. Toyotomi Hideyoshi, Nagachika Narita, Siege of Oshi
2013	Japan	NINJA KIDS!!! Summer Mission Impossible	忍たま乱太郎 夏休み宿題大作戦!の段	Ryuta Tasaki	Action, Comedy. Based on the manga Rakudai Ninja Rantarō. Based on the anime Nintama Rantarō.
2013	Japan	The Kiyosu Conference	清須会議	Kōki Mitani	Comedy, History. Based on the novel Kiyosu Conference. Kiyosu Conference
2013	Japan	Ask This of Rikyu	利休にたずねよ	Mitsutoshi Tanaka	Biography, Drama, History. Based on the novel Ask Rikyu. Sen no Rikyū
2016	Japan	Sanada 10 Braves	真田十勇士	Yukihiko Tsutsumi	Action, Comedy. Based on the play The Ten Braves of Sanada. Sanada Ten Braves
2017	Japan	Tatara Samurai	たたら侍	Yoshinari Nishikôri	Action, Comedy, Drama, History, War.
2017	Japan	Mumon: The Land of Stealth	忍びの国	Yoshihiro Nakamura	Action, Romance. Based on the novel Shinobi no Kuni.
2017	Japan	Flower and Sword	花戦さ	Tetsuo Shinohara	Comedy, Drama. Based on the novel Flower War.
2017	Japan	Sekigahara	関ヶ原	Masato Harada	Drama, History, War. Based on the novel Sekigahara. Battle of Sekigahara
2019	Japan	Three Nobunagas	3人の信長	Kei Watanabe	Comedy, Drama, History. Oda Nobunaga
2019	Japan	MUSASHI	武蔵 -むさし-	Yasuo Mikami	Action, History. Miyamoto Musashi

== 2020s ==
Year	Country	Main title (Alternative title)	Original title (Original script)	Director	Subject
2021	Japan	Nobutora	信虎	Shusuke Kaneko; Genha Miyashita	Drama. Takeda Nobutora, Takeda Shingen, Anayama Nobutada, Takeda Katsuyori, Encirclement of Nobunaga
2023	Japan	The Legend & Butterfly	レジェンド&バタフライ	Keishi Ōtomo	Drama, History, Romance. Oda Nobunaga, Nōhime
2023	Japan	Kubi	首	Takeshi Kitano	Action, Drama, History, Thriller. Based on the novel Kubi. Toyotomi Hideyoshi, Honnō-ji Incident
2024	Japan	Nintama Rantarō: Invincible Master of the Dokutake Ninja	劇場版 忍たま乱太郎 ドクタケ忍者隊最強の軍師	Masaya Fujimori	Animation, Action, Adventure, Comedy, Family. Based on the novel Failed Ninja Rantaro, the Strongest Strategist of the Dokutake Ninja Corps

== Science fiction, fantasy, and horror ==
Year	Country	Main title (Alternative title)	Original title (Original script)	Director	Subject
1953	Japan	Ugetsu	雨月物語	Kenji Mizoguchi	Drama, Fantasy, War.
1958	Japan	Black Cat Mansion	亡霊怪猫屋敷	Nobuo Nakagawa	Drama, Horror.
1963	Japan	Brave Records of the Sanada Clan	真田風雲録	Tai Kato	Comedy, Fantasy, History.
1966	Japan	Daimajin	大魔神	Kimiyoshi Yasuda	Drama, Fantasy, Horror.
1966	Japan	Return of Daimajin	大魔神怒る	Kenji Misumi	Drama, Fantasy.
1966	Japan	Daimajin Strikes Again	大魔神逆襲	Kazuo Mori	Fantasy.
1969	Japan	Ninja Scope	飛びだす冒険映画 赤影	Junji Kurata; Tetsuya Yamanouchi	Action, Fantasy.
1979	Japan	G.I. Samurai	戦国自衛隊	Kōsei Saitō	Action, Adventure, Sci-Fi. Based on the novel Sengoku Self-Defense Forces.
1982	Japan	Ninja Wars	伊賀忍法帖	Kōsei Saitō	Action, Adventure, Fantasy. Based on the novel Iga Ninja Scrolls. Koji Kashin
1985	Japan	Rumic World: Fire Tripper	るーみっくわーるど 炎トリッパー	Motosuke Takahashi	Animation, Adventure, Drama, Fantasy, History. Based on the manga Flame Tripper.
1986	Japan	Toki no Tabibito: Time Stranger	時空の旅人	Mori Masaki	Animation, Fantasy. Based on the novel Time Traveler.
1986	United States	Ghost Warrior	SFソードキル	J. Larry Carroll	Action, Sci-Fi.
1989	Japan	Wrath of the Ninja: The Yotoden Movie	妖刀伝	Toshiyuki Sakurai; Osamu Yamasaki	Animation, Action, Adventure, Fantasy.
1995	Japan	Crayon Shin-chan: Unkokusai's Ambition	クレヨンしんちゃん 雲黒斎の野望	Mitsuru Hongo	Animation, Action, Adventure, Comedy, Sci-Fi, Thriller. Based on the manga Crayon Shin-chan.
1997	Japan	Moon Over Tao: Makaraga	タオの月	Keita Amemiya	Action, Fantasy.
2001	Japan	Inuyasha the Movie: Affections Touching Across Time	映画犬夜叉 時代を越える想い	Toshiya Shinohara	Animation, Action, Adventure, Fantasy. Based on the manga Inuyasha.
2003	Japan	Inuyasha the Movie: Swords of an Honorable Ruler	映画犬夜叉 天下覇道の剣	Toshiya Shinohara	Animation, Action, Adventure, Fantasy, Thriller. Based on the manga Inuyasha.
2005	Japan	Samurai Commando: Mission 1549	戦国自衛隊1549	Masaaki Tezuka	Action, Sci-Fi. Based on the novel Sengoku Self-Defense Forces 1549.
2005	Japan	Kamen Rider Hibiki & The Seven Senki	劇場版 仮面ライダー響鬼と7人の戦鬼	Taro Sakamoto	Action, Fantasy.
2007	Japan	The Sword of Alexander	大帝の剣	Yukihiko Tsutsumi	Action, Comedy, Fantasy. Based on the novel Emperor's Sword.
2011	Japan	Gal Basara: Sengoku Jidai wa Kengai Desu	ギャルバサラ 戦国時代は圏外です	Futoshi Sato	Comedy, Sci-Fi.
2015	Japan	Samurai Rock	サムライ・ロック	Ryô Nakajima	Action, Sci-Fi. Oda Nobunaga, Toyotomi Hideyoshi
2016	Japan	Nobunaga Concerto	信長協奏曲	Hiroaki Matsuyama	Adventure, Comedy, Sci-Fi. Based on the manga Nobunaga Concerto.
2017	Japan	Honnōji Hotel	本能寺ホテル	Masayuki Suzuki	Action, Comedy, Fantasy. Oda Nobunaga
2019	Japan	Touken Ranbu	映画刀剣乱舞-継承-	Saiji Yakumo	Action, Drama, Fantasy, History. Based on the game series Touken Ranbu.
2019	Japan	Kamen Rider Zi-O the Movie: Over Quartzer	劇場版 仮面ライダージオウ	Ryuta Tasaki	Action, Adventure, Comedy, Fantasy, Sci-Fi.
2021	Japan	Brave: Gunjyo Senki	ブレイブ -群青戦記-	Katsuyuki Motohiro	Adventure, Fantasy, History. Based on the manga Gunjō Senki.

== Television films ==
Year	Country	Main title (Alternative title)	Original title (Original script)	Director	Subject
1961	Japan	Young Nobunaga	若き日の信長		Based on kabuki Nobunaga in his younger days. Oda Nobunaga
1982	Japan	Young Miyamoto Musashi Naughty Dual Wielding	少年宮本武蔵 わんぱく二刀流	Yûgo Serikawa	Based on the novel Duelist Miyamoto Musashi: Boyhood Edition. Miyamoto Musashi
1983	Japan	Women's Osaka Castle	女たちの大坂城		
1987	Japan	Taikoki	太閤記	Kihachi Okamoto	Based on the novel Shinsho Taikoki. Toyotomi Hideyoshi, Oda Nobunaga, Akechi Mitsuhide
1987	Japan	Wild Wind Flute, Demon Sword, Matsudaira Tadateru, Slays the World!	野風の笛 鬼の剣 松平忠輝天下を斬る!	Takeichi Saito	Based on the musical Wild Wind Flute.
1988	Japan	Tokugawa Ieyasu	徳川家康	Yasuo Furuhata	Tokugawa Ieyasu, Toyotomi Hideyoshi, Oda Nobunaga, Ishikawa Kazumasa
1988	Japan	Women of the Warring States Period Passionate in Love - From the Toyotomi Clan	愛に燃える戦国の女－豊臣家の人々より－	Shin'ichi Kamoshita	Based on the novel People of the Toyotomi family. Toyotomi clan
1989	Japan	Oda Nobunaga	織田信長	Sadao Nakajima	Oda Nobunaga
1990	Japan	Miyamoto Musashi	宮本武蔵		Based on the novel Musashi. Miyamoto Musashi
1990	Japan	Sen no Rikyu ~Like snowy grass waiting for spring~	千利休 〜春を待つ雪間草のごとく〜	Haruyuki Suzuki	Sen no Rikyū
1991	Japan	Takeda Shingen	武田信玄	Sadao Nakajima	Drama. Takeda Shingen
1991	Japan	The violent man of the Sengoku period, Dosan Saito, the turbulent conqueror of the world	戦国乱世の暴れん坊 齋藤道三 怒涛の天下取り	Eiichi Kudo	Based on the novels Sengoku Shiki - Saito Dosan and Saito Dosan. Saitō Dōsan
1992	Japan	Furin Volcano	風林火山	Kazuo Ikehiro	Based on the novel Fuurinkazan. Yamamoto Kansuke, Takeda Shingen
1992	Japan	The last victor of the Sengoku period! Tokugawa Ieyasu	戦国最後の勝利者!徳川家康	Toshio Masuda; Yoshiharu Nishigaki	Tokugawa Ieyasu
1993	Japan	The man who conquered the world, Toyotomi Hideyoshi	天下を獲った男 豊臣秀吉	Sadao Nakajima	Toyotomi Hideyoshi
1993	Japan	Legend of Tsuruhime - Rise and Fall of the Seto Inland Sea Army -	鶴姫伝奇 -興亡瀬戸内水軍-	Keiichi Ozawa	Ōhōri Tsuruhime
1993	Japan	The One-Eyed Dragon's Ambition Date Masamune	独眼竜の野望 伊達政宗	Toshio Masuda; Yoshiharu Nishigaki	Date Masamune
1993	Japan	Ranmaru Mori ~A young lion who ran through the Sengoku period~	森蘭丸〜戦国を駆け抜けた若獅子〜	Yasuhiko Igawa	Mori Ranmaru
1995	Japan	You go beyond time	君は時のかなたへ		Tokugawa Ieyasu
1995	Japan	Date Masamune, the One-Eyed Dragon of Love and Ambition	愛と野望の独眼竜 伊達政宗	Yasuo Furuhata	Date Masamune
1998	Japan	Oda Nobunaga: The idiot who took over the world	織田信長 天下を取ったバカ		Oda Nobunaga
1999	Japan	Kerori no Doton: The man who competed with Hideyoshi for women.	けろりの道頓 秀吉と女を争った男		Based on the novel Calm Doton. Seian Doton
1999	Japan	Kaga Hyakumangoku - Sengoku Survival of Mother and Child	加賀百万石〜母と子の戦国サバイバル	Yoshio Mochizuki	Based on the novels Maeda Toshiie and Kaga Hyakumangoku. Maeda Matsu, Maeda Toshiie, Jufuku-in Temple
2001	Japan	Miyamoto Musashi	宮本武蔵	Akimitsu Sasaki; Takashi Fujio	Based on the novel Musashi. Miyamoto Musashi
2003	Japan	Taikoki: The Man Called Monkey	太閤記 サルと呼ばれた男	Masayuki Suzuki	Based on the novel Shinsho Taikoki. Toyotomi Hideyoshi
2003	Japan	Otomo Sorin ~ In search of the kingdom of the heart	大友宗麟〜心の王国を求めて	Yoshio Mochizuki	Based on the novel King's Elegy. Ōtomo Sōrin
2005	Japan	Country theft story	国盗り物語		Based on the novel The Story of the Conquest of the Country. Saitō Dōsan
2006	Japan	Furin Volcano	風林火山	Mitsumasa Saito	Based on the novel Fuurinkazan. Yamamoto Kansuke, Takeda Shingen
2006	Japan	Nobunaga's coffin	信長の棺	Haruhiko Mimura	Based on the novel Nobunaga's coffin. Gyuichi Ota, Toyotomi Hideyoshi
2007	Japan	The enemy is at Honnoji Temple	敵は本能寺にあり	Haruhiko Mimura	Based on the novel Akechi Samanosuke's Love. Akechi Hidemitsu, Oda Nobunaga
2007	Japan	Mitsuhide Akechi ~The man who was not loved by God~	明智光秀〜神に愛されなかった男〜	Hiroshi Nishitani	Akechi Mitsuhide, Tsumaki Hiroko, Toyotomi Hideyoshi
2008	Japan	Tokugawa Ieyasu and the three women	徳川家康と三人の女	Kōsei Saitō	Tokugawa Ieyasu
2011	Japan	Sengoku Shippuden: Two Military Masters: The Men Who Made Hideyoshi Conquer the World	戦国疾風伝 二人の軍師 秀吉に天下を獲らせた男たち	Hiroshi Akabane	Based on the novel Hanbei Takenaka and Kanbei Kuroda, Two Military Strategists. Takenaka Shigeharu, Kuroda Yoshitaka
2012	Japan	The Heaven of the Lying Dragon - Date Masamune, the man known as the One-Eyed Dragon	臥竜の天〜伊達政宗 独眼竜と呼ばれた男〜		
2014	Japan	Kagemusha Tokugawa Ieyasu	影武者徳川家康	Toshihiko Shigemitsu	Drama, History. Based on the novel Body double Tokugawa Ieyasu. Tokugawa Ieyasu
2016	Japan	Nobunaga Burning	信長燃ゆ		Based on the novel Nobunaga Burns.
2017	Japan	Father, Nobunaga.	父、ノブナガ。		
2018	Japan	Ashigaru SP ~Super space-time romantic comedy again~	アシガールSP 〜超時空ラブコメ再び〜	Kodai Morimoto	Based on the manga Ashi-Girl.
2021	Japan	OKEHAZAMA ~Oda Nobunaga~	桶狭間 OKEHAZAMA〜織田信長〜		Oda Nobunaga, Imagawa Yoshimoto, Battle of Okehazama

== Television series ==
Year	Country	Main title (Alternative title)	Original title (Original script)	Director	Subject
1958-59	Japan	Wind Boy	風小僧		Based on the novel Red Peacock.
1959	Japan	Shinsho Taikōki	新書太閤記	Noboru Ono	Based on the novel Shinsho Taikoki. Toyotomi Hideyoshi
1959	Japan	Furinkazan	風林火山		Based on the novel Fuurinkazan. Yamamoto Kansuke, Takeda Shingen
1960	Japan	Castle of Owls	梟の城		Based on the novel Fukurō no Shiro.
1961	Japan	Shinshu Tenmakyo	神州天馬侠		Based on the novel Shinshu Tenmakyo.
1961-62	Japan	New Nations Story: Red Peacock	新諸国物語 紅孔雀		Based on the novel Red Peacock.
1962-63	Japan	Oda Nobunaga	織田信長	Ryô Hagiwara; Asaji Sumida	Oda Nobunaga
1963	Japan	Sengoku President	戦国大統領		Toyotomi Hideyoshi
1964	Japan	Tokugawa Ieyasu	徳川家康		Based on the novel Tokugawa Ieyasu. Tokugawa Ieyasu
1964	Japan	Ichikawa Ennosuke Hour Young Nobunaga	市川猿之助アワー 若き日の信長		Based on kabuki Nobunaga in his younger days. Oda Nobunaga
1964-5	Japan	Fuun Sanada Castle	風雲真田城		Sanada Ten Braves
1964-5	Japan	Ninja	忍びの者		Based on the Shinobi no Mono novels.
1965	Japan	Taikōki	太閤記		Based on the novel Shinsho Taikoki. Toyotomi Hideyoshi
1965	Japan	Female Musashi	女人武蔵		Based on the novel Female Musashi. Miyamoto Musashi
1966-7	Japan	Takeda Shingen	武田信玄		Takeda Shingen
1966-7	Japan	Naughty Fort	わんぱく砦		Based on the original work by Nakajima Tawo.
1967	Japan	Shinshu Tenmakyo	神州天馬侠		Based on the novel Shinshu Tenmakyo.
1967-8	Japan	Masked Ninja Akakage	仮面の忍者 赤影		Action, Adventure, Fantasy, Sci-Fi. Based on the manga Ninja Akakage.
1968	Japan	Invincible! Naughty	無敵!わんぱく		
1969	Japan	Dororo	どろろ	Gisaburō Sugii	Based on the manga Dororo.
1969	Japan	Tokugawa Hidetada's wife	徳川秀忠の妻		The Asai Sisters, Oeyo
1969	Japan	Ten to Chi to	天と地と		Based on the novel Heaven and Earth. Uesugi Kenshin
1969	Japan	Furinkazan	風林火山		Based on the novel Fuurinkazan. Yamamoto Kansuke, Takeda Shingen
1969-70	Japan	Sengoku Atsushi Monogatari	戦国艶物語		Oichi, Yodo-dono, Senhime
1970	Japan	Takechiyo and his mother	竹千代と母		Based on the novel Tokugawa Ieyasu. Tokugawa Ieyasu
1970	Japan	Seishun Taikoki Watch it now!	青春太閤記 いまにみておれ!		Based on the novel Shinsho Taikoki. Toyotomi Hideyoshi
1970	Japan	Woman of Osaka Castle	大坂城の女		
1970-71	Japan	Miyamoto Musashi	宮本武蔵		Based on the novel Musashi. Miyamoto Musashi
1971	Japan	Haru no Sakamichi	春の坂道		Based on the novels Spring Slope (Munenori Yagyu) and Tokugawa Ieyasu. Yagyū Munenori
1971-3	Japan	Everyone stay tuned	みんなよっといで		
1972-3	Japan	Swift Hero Lion Maru	快傑ライオン丸		Action, Fantasy.
1973	Japan	Okuni in Izumo	出雲の阿国		Based on the novel Okuni of Izumo. Izumo no Okuni
1973	Japan	Storm Cloud Lion Maru	風雲ライオン丸		Adventure, History.
1973	Japan	Kunitori Monogatari	国盗り物語		Based on the novels The Story of the Conquest of the Country, New History of the Taiko, Achievement, Butt-talking Magoichi, and Owls' Castle. Saitō Dōsan, Oda Nobunaga
1973	Japan	Shinsho Taikōki	新書太閤記	Yasuo Furuhata; Daisuke Yamazaki	Based on the novel Shinsho Taikoki. Toyotomi Hideyoshi
1975	Japan	Young Tokugawa Ieyasu	少年徳川家康	Kimio Yabuki; Takeshi Tamiya	Based on the novel Tokugawa Ieyasu. Tokugawa Ieyasu
1975-6	Japan	Miyamoto Musashi	宮本武蔵		Based on the novel Musashi. Miyamoto Musashi
1978	Japan	Golden Days	黄金の日日		Based on the novel Golden Days. Luzon Sukezaemon, Sugitani Zenjūbō, Ishikawa Goemon
1979-80	Japan	Manga Sarutobi Sasuke	まんが猿飛佐助	Shohei Tôjô	Animation, Action, Adventure, Fantasy. Sarutobi Sasuke, Sanada Ten Braves
1980	United States; Japan	Shōgun		Jerry London	Adventure, Drama, History, War. Based on the novel Shōgun.
1980	Japan	Hojo Soun in his younger days	若き日の北條早雲		Based on the novel Hojo Soun. Hōjō Sōun
1980	Japan	Sarutobi Sasuke	猿飛佐助		Sarutobi Sasuke, Sanada Ten Braves
1980	Japan	Wind God's Gate	風神の門		Based on the novel Wind God's Gate. Sanada Ten Braves
1981	Japan	Onna Taikoki	おんな太閤記		Based on the novel Shinsho Taikoki. Kōdai-in
1981	Japan	Sekigahara	関ヶ原		Based on the novel Sekigahara.
1983	Japan	Ōoku	大奥		Oeyo
1983	Japan	Tokugawa Ieyasu	徳川 家康		Drama, History. Based on the novel Tokugawa Ieyasu. Tokugawa Ieyasu
1984-5	Japan	Miyamoto Musashi	宮本武蔵		Based on the novel Musashi. Miyamoto Musashi
1985	Japan	Masked Ninja Akakage	仮面の忍者 赤影		Based on the manga Ninja Akakage.
1985-86	Japan	Sanada Taiheiki	真田太平記		Based on the novel Sanada Taiheiki. Sanada Masayuki, Sanada Nobuyuki, Sanada Yukimura
1986-7	Japan	Onnafuurinkazan	おんな風林火山		Oda Nobutada, Matsuhime
1987-92	Japan	Sengoku Warlords Series	戦国武将シリーズ	Yuichi Harada; Yonosuke Minamoto	
1987-8	Japan	Masked Ninja Akakage	仮面の忍者赤影		Based on the manga Ninja Akakage.
1987	Japan	Dokuganryū Masamune	独眼竜政宗		Biography, Drama, History, Romance, War. Based on the novel Date Masamune. Date Masamune
1988	Japan	Women's Hyakumangoku	女たちの百万石		
1988	Japan	Takeda Shingen	武田信玄		Drama. Based on the novels Takeda Shingen and Three Generations of the Takeda Clan. Takeda Shingen
1989	Japan	Demon	妖魔	Takashi Anno	Based on the manga Demon.
1989	Japan	Kasuga station	春日局		Lady Kasuga
1989	Japan	Fuun! Yukimura Sanada	風雲!真田幸村		Sanada Yukimura, Tokugawa Ieyasu, Sanada Ten Braves
1989	Japan	Yotoden: Chronicle of the Warlord Period	戦国奇譚妖刀伝		Animation, Drama, Fantasy.
1989	Japan	Void War History MIROKU	虚無戦史MIROKU	Hiroo Takeuchi	Based on the manga History of the Void War MIROKU.
1990	Japan	Sengoku Warlords: Blast Boy Hissatsuman	戦国武将列伝 爆風童子ヒッサツマン	Hiroshi Sasagawa	
1992	Japan	Nobunaga KING OF ZIPANGU	信長 KING OF ZIPANGU		Oda Nobunaga, Luís Fróis, Christianity in Japan
1992-3	Japan	Salad Ten Braves Tomatoman	サラダ十勇士トマトマン	Jyohei Matsuura	Sanada Ten Braves
1993	Japan	Ryukyu wind	琉球の風		Based on the novel Ryukyu Wind. Ryukyu Kingdom
1994	Japan	Oda Nobunaga	織田信長		Based on the novel Oda Nobunaga. Oda Nobunaga
1994	Japan	Paid vacation for Sengoku samurai	戦国武士の有給休暇	Yoshio Mochizuki	
1994	Japan	Hana no Ran	花の乱		Heian-kyō, Hino Tomiko, Ashikaga Yoshimasa, Ōnin War
1994-5	Japan	Ninja Sentai Kakuranger	忍者戦隊カクレンジャー	Yoshiaki Kobayashi	Action, Adventure, Comedy, Drama, Fantasy, Mystery, Sci-Fi.
1994-5	Japan	Rai: Galactic Civil War Chronicle	銀河戦国群雄伝ライ	Seiji Okuda	Animation, Action, Adventure, Romance, Sci-Fi, War. Based on the manga Ginga Sengoku Gun'yūden Rai.
1995	Japan	Toyotomi Hideyoshi conquers the world!	豊臣秀吉 天下を獲る!		Toyotomi Hideyoshi
1996	Japan	Hideyoshi	秀吉		Action, Adventure, Drama, History, War. Based on the novels Hideyoshi: The Man Who Surpassed His Dreams, Toyotomi Hidenaga, and Demons and People: Nobunaga and Mitsuhide. Toyotomi Hideyoshi
1997	Japan	Motonari Mori	毛利元就		Based on the novel Yamagiri, Wife of Motonari Mori. Mōri Motonari
1997	Japan	Princess likes sailor suit	姫はセーラー服がお好き		
1998	Japan	Yukimura Sanada, the man Ieyasu feared the most	家康が最も恐れた男 真田幸村		Sanada Yukimura, Yodo-dono, Tokugawa Ieyasu
1998	Japan	Kagemusha Tokugawa Ieyasu	影武者徳川家康		Drama, History. Based on the novel Body double Tokugawa Ieyasu. Tokugawa Ieyasu
2000	Japan	Aoi	葵 徳川三代		Drama, History. Tokugawa Ieyasu, Tokugawa Hidetada, Tokugawa Iemitsu, Battle of Sekigahara, Toyotomi government
2000-4	Japan	Inuyasha	犬夜叉		Animation, Action, Adventure, Comedy, Drama, Fantasy, Romance. Based on the manga Inuyasha.
2002	Japan	Toshiie and Matsu ~ Kaga Hyakumangoku Story ~	利家とまつ〜加賀百万石物語〜		Based on the manga Toshiie and Matsu. Maeda Toshiie, Maeda Matsu
2002	Japan	Samurai Deeper Kyo		Junji Nishimura	Based on the manga Samurai Deeper Kyo.
2003	Japan	Musashi	武蔵 MUSASHI		Based on the novel Musashi. Miyamoto Musashi
2003/5	Japan	New Shadow Army Series	新 影の軍団シリーズ	Takeshi Miyasaka; Bunmei Kato	
2004	Japan	Shura no Toki – Age of Chaos	陸奥圓明流外伝 修羅の刻	Shin Misawa	Animation, Action, Comedy, Drama, History. Based on the manga Shura no Mon.
2005	Japan	New interpretation Sanada Ten Braves	新釈 眞田十勇士		Sanada Ten Braves
2006	Japan	Taikoki ~ Hideyoshi, the man who conquered the world	太閤記〜天下を獲った男・秀吉		Based on the novel Shinsho Taikoki. Toyotomi Hideyoshi
2006	Japan	Okuni in Izumo	出雲の阿国		Based on the novel Okuni of Izumo. Izumo no Okuni
2006	Japan	Kōmyō ga Tsuji	功名が辻		Drama. Based on the novel Achievement.
2006	Japan	Warring States JSDF Battle of Sekigahara	戦国自衛隊 関ケ原の戦い		Action, Drama, History. Based on the novel Sengoku Self-Defense Forces.
2007	Japan	The Trusted Confidant	風林火山		Drama, History. Based on the novel Fuurinkazan. Yamamoto Kansuke, Takeda Shingen
2009	Japan	Nene: Onna Taikōki	寧々〜おんな太閤記		Based on the novel Shinsho Taikoki. Kōdai-in
2009	Japan	Heart of a Samurai	天地人		Drama, History. Based on the novel Heaven, earth and people. Naoe Kanetsugu
2009-10	Japan	Inuyasha: The Final Act	犬夜叉 完結編		Animation, Action, Adventure, Comedy, Drama, Fantasy, Romance. Based on the manga Inuyasha.
2009-10	Japan	Sengoku Basara: Samurai Kings	戦国BASARA		Animation, Action, Drama, War. Based on the game series Sengoku Basara.
2010-11	Japan	With my lord	殿といっしょ		Based on the manga Tono to Issho.
2011	Japan	Tsukahara Bokuden	塚原卜伝		Based on the novel Tsukahara Bokuden's 12-Match Series.
2011	Japan	Princess Go	江〜姫たちの戦国〜		Drama, History. Based on the novel Princesses of the Warring States Period. Oeyo
2011	Japan	Battle Girls: Time Paradox	戦国乙女～桃色パラドックス～	Hideki Okamoto	Animation, Sci-Fi. Based on pachinko CR Sengoku Otome.
2011-12	Japan	Sengoku☆Paradise -Kiwami-	戦国☆パラダイス -極-	Katsuya Kikuchi	Based on the mobile game Sengoku Paradise.
2011-12	Japan	Monsters	へうげもの	Kōichi Mashimo	Based on the manga Hyouge Mono. Furuta Oribe
2012	Japan	Brave 10		Kiyoko Sayama	Based on the manga Brave 10. Sanada Ten Braves
2012	Japan		戦国BASARA -MOONLIGHT PARTY-	Keita Matsuda; Abeyūichi	Based on the game series Sengoku Basara.
2012	Japan		戦国BASARA-MOONLIGHT PARTY- Remix 前篇・後篇	Keita Matsuda; Abeyūichi	Based on the game series Sengoku Basara.
2012	Japan	The Ambition of Oda Nobuna	織田信奈の野望	Yûji Kumazawa	Animation, Action, Comedy, History, Romance, War. Based on the light novel The Ambition of Oda Nobuna.
2012-3	Japan	Nohime	濃姫	Tatsuzo Inohara	Nōhime
2013	Japan	Female Nobunaga	女信長		Based on the novel Female Nobunaga. Oda Nobunaga
2013	Japan	Righteous and dignified!! Kanetsugu and Keiji	義風堂々!! 兼続と慶次		Based on the manga The Righteous and Dignified Naoe Kanetsugu - Maeda Keiji's Monthly Tale -.
2013-14	Japan	A Chef of Nobunaga (The Knife and the Sword)	信長のシェフ		Drama. Based on the manga A Chef of Nobunaga.
2014	Japan	Nobunaga Concerto	信長協奏曲		Based on the manga Nobunaga Concerto.
2014	Japan	Nobunaga Concerto	信長協奏曲		Based on the manga Nobunaga Concerto.
2014	Japan	Sengoku Basara: End of Judgement	戦国BASARA Judge End	Takashi Sano	Action. Based on the game series Sengoku Basara.
2014	Japan	Gunshi Kanbei	軍師官兵衛		Drama, History. Kuroda Yoshitaka
2014	Japan	Miyamoto Musashi	宮本武蔵	Ryosuke Kanesaki	Based on the novel Musashi. Miyamoto Musashi
2016	Japan	Sanada Maru	真田丸		Drama, History. Sanada Yukimura
2016	Japan	Ishikawa Goemon	石川五右衛門		Drama, History. Based on the play Ishikawa Goemon. Ishikawa Goemon
2016-17	Japan	Sengoku Choju Giga	戦国鳥獣戯画	Takashi Sumita	Based on paintings Chōjū-jinbutsu-giga.
2016-18	Japan	Anime: Nobunaga's Shinobi	アニメ：信長の忍び	Akitaro Daichi	Based on the manga Ninja Girl & Samurai Master. Oda Nobunaga
2017	Japan	Fantasy Taiga Drama Nobuo Oda	空想大河ドラマ 小田信夫		
2017	Japan	Ashigaru	アシガール	Kodai Morimoto	Based on the manga Ashi-Girl.
2017	Japan	Naotora: The Lady Warlord	おんな城主 直虎		Drama, History. Ii Naotora
2018-21	Japan	Anime produced by Ogaki City, Gifu Prefecture	岐阜県大垣市プロデュースアニメ		
2019	Japan	Kochoki	胡蝶綺 〜若き信長〜	Noriyuki Abe	Animation. Oda Nobunaga
2019	Japan	Dororo	どろろ	Kazuhiro Furuhashi	Based on the manga Dororo.
2019	Japan	New Year period drama Ieyasu builds Edo	正月時代劇 家康、江戸を建てる		Based on the novel Ieyasu builds Edo. Tokugawa Ieyasu
2020-21	Japan	Awaiting Kirin	麒麟がくる		Drama. Akechi Mitsuhide
2020-22	Japan	Yashahime: Princess Half-Demon	半妖の夜叉姫	Teruo Sato; Masakazu Hishida	Animation, Action, Adventure, Comedy, Drama, Family, Fantasy.
2021	Japan; United States	Yasuke		LeSean Thomas; Takeru Satō	Animation, Action, Adventure, Drama, Fantasy, Thriller. Yasuke
2022	Japan	A samurai became a clerk at Mac.	武士が、マックで店員になった件。	Masaya Kakei	
2022	Japan	Orient	オリエント	Tetsuya Yanagisawa	Animation, Adventure, Fantasy. Based on the manga Orient.
2023	Japan	What Will You Do, Ieyasu?	どうする家康		Drama, History. Tokugawa Ieyasu
2024	United States	Shōgun			Adventure, Drama, History, War. Based on the novel Shōgun.
2024	Japan	Sengoku Youko	戦国妖狐	Masahiro Aizawa	Animation, Adventure, Drama, Fantasy. Based on the manga Sengoku Youko.
2025	Japan	Turkey! Time to Strike	Turkey!	Susumu Kudo	Animation, Drama, Sport.
2025	Japan	Masked Ninja Akakage	仮面の忍者 赤影	Takashi Miike	Action, Adventure, Fantasy. Based on the manga Ninja Akakage.
2026	Japan	Brothers in Arms	豊臣兄弟!	Yoshio Watanabe, Tadashi Tanaka, Tetsuya Watanabe	Biography, Drama, History. Toyotomi Hideyoshi, Toyotomi Hidenaga

== Imjin War ==
=== Films ===
Year	Country	Main title (Alternative title)	Original title (Original script)	Director	Subject
1962	South Korea	Pyongyang Gisaeng Gyewolhyang	평양 기생 계월향	Taehwan Lee	Gyewolhyang
1962	South Korea	The Great Hero, Lee Sun-shin	성웅 이순신	Yu Hyun-mok	Yi Sun-sin
1968	South Korea	Winds and Clouds	풍운 - 임란야화	Kwon Young-soon	
1971	South Korea	Admiral Lee Sun-shin	성웅 이순신	Gyu-woong Lee	Drama, War. Based on the diary Nanjung ilgi. Yi Sun-sin
1973	South Korea	The General in Red Robes	홍의 장군	Lee Doo-yong	War. Kwak Chaeu
1977	South Korea	Persistence	집념	Inhyeon Choi	Hŏ Chun
1977	South Korea	Madame Kye in the Imjin War	임진왜란과 계월향	Im Kwon-taek	Gyewolhyang
1978	South Korea	Diary of Korean-Japanese War	난중일기	Jang Il-ho	Drama, War. Yi Sun-sin
1997	South Korea	Admiral's Diary	난중일기	Byeon Gangmun	Yi Sun-sin
2014	South Korea	The Admiral: Roaring Currents	명량	Kim Han-min	Action, Drama, History, War. Yi Sun-sin, Battle of Myeongnyang
2017	South Korea	Warriors of the Dawn	대립군	Jeong Yoon-cheol	Adventure, Drama, History, War. Gwanghaegun of Joseon
2022	South Korea	Hansan: Rising Dragon	한산: 용의 출현	Kim Han-min	Action, Drama, History, War. Yi Sun-sin, Battle of Hansan Island
2023	South Korea	Noryang: Deadly Sea	노량: 죽음의 바다	Kim Han-min	Action, Biography, History, War. Yi Sun-sin, Battle of Noryang
2024	South Korea	Uprising	전,란	Kim Sang-man	Action, Drama, History, Thriller, War.

=== Television series ===
Year	Country	Main title (Alternative title)	Original title (Original script)	Director	Subject
1968	South Korea	War diary	난중일기		Based on the diary Nanjung ilgi. Yi Sun-sin
1972-3	South Korea	Imjin War	임진왜란		
1975-6	South Korea	Persistence	집념		Hŏ Chun
1981	South Korea	Women's country	여인들의 타국 女たちの他国		
1983-90	South Korea	500 years of Joseon Dynasty	조선왕조 오백년		Joseon
1985-6	South Korea	Imjin War	임진왜란		
1986-7	South Korea	I'm leaving for Ewha	이화에 월백하고		Based on the novel The Chronicles of the Famous Gi.
1991	South Korea	Donguibogam	동의보감		Based on the novel Donguibogam.
1999-2000	South Korea	Hur Jun	허준		Drama. Hŏ Chun
2003-4	South Korea	King's woman	왕의 여자		Based on the novel Oh, That Cloud That's Sleeping. Gwanghaegun of Joseon, Kim Kaesi
2004-5	South Korea	Immortal Admiral Yi Sun-sin	불멸의 이순신		Action, Biography, Drama, History, War. Based on the novels Song of the Sword and Imperishability. Yi Sun-sin
2013	South Korea	Gu Family Book	구가의 서	Shin Woo-chul; Kim Jung-hyun	Action, Comedy, Fantasy, Romance.
2013	South Korea	Goddess of Fire	불의 여신 정이		Drama, History, Romance.
2013	South Korea	Hur Jun, The Original Story	구암 허준		Drama. Hŏ Chun
2014-5	South Korea	The King's Face	왕의 얼굴		Action, Drama, Romance, Thriller.
2015	South Korea	The Jingbirok: A Memoir of Imjin War	징비록	Jung Hyung-soo; Jung Ji-yeon	Drama, History, War. Based on the book Jingbirok.
2016	South Korea	Imjin War 1592	임진왜란 1592		
2017	South Korea	Live Up to Your Name	명불허전	Hong Jong-chan	Drama, Fantasy, Romance. Heo Im
202X	South Korea	Seven years' war	7년 전쟁	Kim Han-min	
