= Kumokiri Nizaemon =

Kumokiri Nizaemon may refer to:

- Bandits vs. Samurai Squadron or Kumokiri Nizaemon, a 1978 Japanese film
- Kumokiri Nizaemon (novel), a historical novel by Shōtarō Ikenami.
- Kumokiri Nizaemon (TV series), a 1995 Japanese television period drama on Fuji TV
- Kumokiri Nizaemon (TV series 2013), a 2013 Japanese television period drama on NHK
