= Yūko Kotegawa =

Japanese actress

Yūko Kotegawa (古手川祐子, Kotegawa Yūko; born July 16, 1959) is a Japanese actress from the city of Ōita.

== Biography ==
Yūko graduated from high school in the city of Ōita. She placed first in the 1976 Miss Salad Girl contest (the runner-up was Yūko Natori). She landed a part in a Kanebo cosmetics commercial and joined Toho Entertainment. Her sister Nobuko is also in acting.

Yūko made her film debut in 1976 in Hoshi to Arashi and in 1979 appeared in Ah! Nomugi Toge. She was cast in the 1983 Toho adaptation of the novel The Makioka Sisters. In 1991 the Japan Academy recognized her as the Outstanding Performance by an Actress in a Leading Role for portraying Noriko Kai in the 1989 Toho film Hana no Furu Gogo (or Afternoon when Flowers Fell). She played Aguri (later Yōzei-in), the wife of Asano Naganori, in the 1994 Chūshingura Shijū-shichinin no Shikaku.

She appeared on television in 1977 as the female lead in Bakumatsu Miraijin on NHK. Her 1984 portrayal of Otsū, the love interest of Miyamoto Musashi in NHK's 45-part prime-time series based on the Eiji Yoshikawa novel, was a major high point of her career. She also took the female lead in the 1993 Taiga drama Homura Tatsu opposite Ken Watanabe. In 2004 NHK cast her as the leading lady in Jīji: Mago to ita Natsu with Toshiyuki Nishida.

Meanwhile, she appeared on privately owned networks in many prominent roles. On Tokyo Broadcasting System, Yūko played characters in series in 1980, '81, and '82, including the female lead in Totsuzen no Ashita. Asahi TV cast her in the lead role in two 90 minute specials in the Onyado Kawasemi jidaigeki series (1988–89); Yasuko Sawaguchi, Reiko Takashima and others have played the same character. Nippon Television gave her the lead in the 1990 Ikenai Joshikō Monogatari and second billing in Omoide-zukuri in the following year. She returned to Asahi and jidaigeki in the title role in two series with the title Tōyama no Kin-san vs. Onna Nezumi opposite Hiroki Matsukata (1997 and 1998). A decade later, the network paired the two again, and Yūko portrayed Kikyō, the leading lady, in Surōnin Tsukikage Hyōgo.

A versatile actress, Kotegawa has appeared in many other formats. She is a frequent guest star, playing contemporary and period roles. She has taken the part of the criminal in shows such as Keibuho Furuhata Ninzaburō. Yūko has also appeared in several two-hour dramas. In one of these, in the G.I. Samurai (Sengoku Jietai) franchise, she portrayed Nene, the wife of Toyotomi Hideyoshi. She has done voice acting, taking the part of Yolda in Origin: Spirits of the Past. Yūko counts Subaru, Tiger Corporation, and Lion among her commercial clients.

== Filmography ==
=== Films ===
- Imperial Navy (1981), Yōko Hongō
- The Makioka Sisters (1983), Taeko Makioka
- Haru no Kane (1985), Tae Ishimoto
- Hana no Furu Gogo (1989), Noriko Kai
- Kozure Ōkami: Sono Chiisaki Te ni (1993)
- 47 Ronin (1994), Yōzen-in
- Onmyōji 2 (2003)
- The Homeless Student (2008)

=== Television ===
- Sekigahara (1981), Natsu
- The Women of Osaka Castle (1983), Senhime
- Miyamoto Musashi (1984–85), Otsū
- Furuhata Ninzaburō (1994), Ari Sasayama
- Sengoku Jieitai: Sekigahara no Tatakai (2006), Kōdai-in
- GeGeGe no Nyōbō (2010), Miyako Iida

== Awards ==
Year	Award	Category	Work(s)	Result	Ref.
1980	4th Elan d'or Awards	Newcomer of the Year	Herself	Won	
1990	13th Japan Academy Film Prize	Best Actress	Hana no Furu Gogo	Nominated	

== Sources ==
This article incorporates material from 古手川祐子 (Kotegawa Yūko) in the Japanese Wikipedia, retrieved on March 9, 2008.
