= James Erwin =

James Erwin may refer to:

- James Erwin (politician) (1920–2005), American politician and attorney from Maine
- James Erwin (author) (born 1974), American author
- James Brailsford Erwin (1856–1924), U.S. Army general
