= Hana no Furu Gogo =

Japanese novel by Teru Miyamoto

- Author: Teru Miyamoto
- Original title: 花の降る午後
- Language: Japanese
- Set in: 1980s
- Published: 1988
- Publisher: Kadokawa Shoten (1988), Kondansha Bunko (1995)
- Pages: 320–476

Hana no Furu Gogo (Japanese: 花の降る午後, Hepburn: Hana no furu gogo) is a novel by Japanese author Teru Miyamoto. Serialized in local newspapers from 1985 to 1986 and published by Kadokawa Shoten, it follows Noriko Kai as she manages the French restaurant Avignon in Kobe after her husband's death. A painter named Masamichi Takami later discovers a letter revealing Noriko's late husband had a hidden child. As the restaurant faces scandals and threats from a criminal couple, Noriko enlists the help of a private detective and her staff to save Avignon. Noriko later confronts the criminals and embraces her husband's secret child.

In 1989, the story was adapted into a television drama that aired on NHK General TV, starring Shima Iwashita, Hideaki Nitani, and Toshiyuki Nagashima. That same year, Kadokawa Eiga released a film adaptation of the story, which premiered on October 7, 1989. It features Yūko Kotegawa as Noriko Kai and Junko Sakurada as Misa Araki, both of whom received accolades at the 13th Japan Academy Awards. The film had an early release in the Kansai region on September 15, 1989. Additionally, the Japanese band Carlos Toshiki & Omega Tribe released the single "Hana no Furu Gogo" on September 5, 1989, as a tie-in for the film.

== Biographical background and publication ==
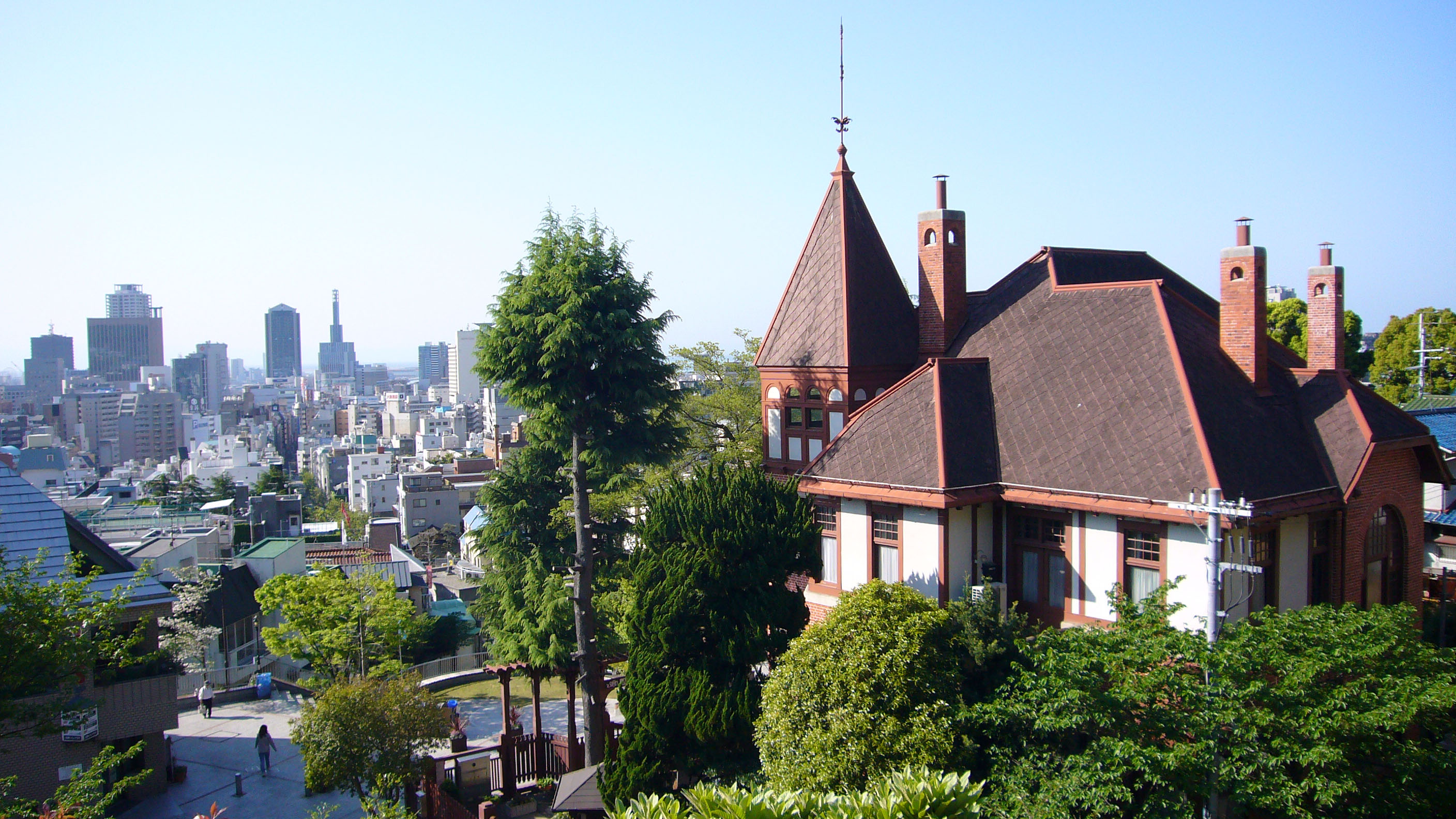
Hana no Furu Gogo is set in Kobe, where Miyamoto was born and set several of his works in.

Teru Miyamoto was born and raised in Kobe, and several of his works are set in the city. This story, in particular, is set in the uptown area of Kobe. The story was serialized in local newspapers, including the Minami-Nihon Shimbun, the Niigata Nippo, the Tokushima Shimbun, and the Kita-Nihon Shimbun, from 1985 to 1986. In the afterword to Miyamoto Teru Zenshū dai 8-kan, he wrote that the reason for writing this work was his desire to see the good people in the story find happiness after a series of accidents and misfortunes involving friends, acquaintances, and family members.

== Plot summary ==
After the death of her husband, Yoshinao, in 1981, Noriko Kai manages the French restaurant Avignon in Kobe, which Yoshinao had left behind. Four years later, Masamichi Takami, a young painter, visits the restaurant and offers Noriko a painting called White House and proposes holding his own exhibition there. However, a letter from Yoshinao was discovered on the back of the painting, revealing to Noriko that he had a hidden child.

Around the same time, waiters Shuichi Akitsu, Toshihiro Mizuno, and manager Naoe Hayama quit their jobs at Avignon due to a scandal. Consulting her acquaintance, Doctor Wong Kin Ming, Noriko learns that Yukio and Misa Araki, a couple involved in gambling and diamond smuggling, were attempting to take over Avignon. Noriko enlists Yoshinao's best friend, private detective Kenichi Kudo, to investigate the Araki couple. During this period, the driver Koshiba and chef Katsuro Kaga were attacked and injured, forcing Avignon to close temporarily.

Encouraged by Takami and with the efforts of Kaga, Avignon soon reopened. However, Misa Araki plans to take Jill, the daughter of her neighbor Reed Brown, as a hostage to seize the land. Noriko infiltrated the Araki couple's cruiser party and rescue Jill. Misa then attempted to reach out to Mika, Yoshinao's secret child, but Noriko confronts Misa and persuaded her to abandon her plan, empathizing with her sadness. Later, Mika unexpectedly visits Avignon, and Noriko warmly welcome her, watching over her with care.

== Media ==
Poster of the Hana no Furu Gogo film adaptation. Actresses Yūko Kotegawa (left) and Junko Sakurada (right) won awards at the 13th Japan Academy Film Prizes for their performances.

=== Television drama ===
In 1989, a television drama adaptation of the book aired on NHK General TV. The drama starred Shima Iwashita, Hideaki Nitani, and Toshiyuki Nagashima. It was written by Hata Mineaki and directed by Hiroyuki Eguchi, with the theme song "Hitori Botchi no Dimanshe (Nichiyōbi)" by Yasuko Ōki.

=== Film ===
On October 7, 1989, Kadokawa Eiga released a film adaptation at the Miyukiza and other Toho foreign film theaters. This version was written and directed by Kazuki Ōmori. Yūko Kotegawa (portraying Noriko Kai) won the Best Actress award at the 13th Japan Academy Awards, while Junko Sakurada (portraying Misa Araki) won the Best Supporting Actress award. Filming took place in Kitano-chō, a district within Kobe. Because it was set and filmed in Kobe, it was released a month early on September 15 in the Kansai region. The official soundtrack was produced by Haruki Kadokawa and featured songs mostly composed by Kazuhiko Katō, along with three songs by Carlos Toshiki & Omega Tribe, including an original song used as the theme. The film grossed 300 million yen at the box office.

==== Awards and nominations ====
Japan Academy Film Prize
Category	Recipient(s)	Result
Best Actress	Yūko Kotegawa	Won
Best Supporting Actress	Junko Sakurada	Won

=== Music ===
On September 5, 1989, the Japanese band Carlos Toshiki & Omega Tribe released the single "Hana no Furu Gogo" as a tie-in for the film. The song was included in the soundtrack, which was released on September 10. "Hana no Furu Gogo" serves as the theme song and was the last single and single cassette released by VAP before the band moved to the Warner Pioneer label. The B-side, "Bad Girl," was composed by Yasuharu Konishi and Carlos Toshiki and is from the album of the same name. Written by Masao Urino and Tetsuji Hayashi, "Hana no Furu Gogo" peaked at number 26 on the Oricon Singles Chart. The song was later included in the 2022 re-release of Bad Girl, alongside other tracks that were not part of the original album.
