= Endless Thread =

Endless Thread is a podcast from Boston-based WBUR, in partnership with Reddit, that focuses on stories relating to Reddit posts. The hosts are Ben Brock Johnson (the former host of Marketplace Tech) and Amory Sivertson (who formerly worked on Modern Love: The Podcast).

The show has covered a large variety of topics, including R/wallstreetbets, QAnon, Geedis, "Rome, Sweet Rome", wrestling, and homelessness.

Endless Thread premiered on January 12, 2018.

== Reviews ==
Ajibabi O. Oloko, writing for The Harvard Crimson in February 2018, called Endless Thread "addictively captivating".

Eliana Dockterman, writing for Time in April 2018, said, "[The hosts] add new depth to these Internet-famous fables with interviews, narrative arcs and, crucially, their fact-checking abilities. So far, they've covered everything from Reddit love stories to the opioid epidemic. The show promises to develop into a worthy rival of Reply All and This American Life."

In April 2020, The Irish Times included Endless Thread on its list of "50 of the Best Podcasts to Listen to Right Now".
