= Sengoku Jieitai: Sekigahara no Tatakai =

Japanese television series

- Promotional picture
- Created by: Kōsei Saitō
- Starring: Takashi Sorimachi; Tatsuya Fujiwara; Atsuro Watabe; Eriko Sato; Emiri Henmi; Masahiko Tsugawa
- Narrated by: Akira Kamiya
- Country of origin: Japan
- No. of seasons: 1
- No. of episodes: 2

Original release
- Network: NTV
- Release: January 31 – February 7, 2006

Sengoku Jieitai: Sekigahara no Tatakai (Japanese: 戦国自衛隊 関ケ原の戦い; lit. Warring States JSDF: Battle of Sekigahara) is a 2006 Japanese television series mainly based on the Sengoku Jieitai movie in 1979 and the 2005 film Sengoku Jieitai 1549. Its director, Kōsei Saitō, also directed the 1979 film.

== Plot ==
After war games were completed in the Fuji Training Ground, a mysterious storm sends First Lieutenant Akiyoshi Iba and his subordinates to the Warring States period, 400 years from the present time. Stranded, Iba wants to return to the present with the rest of his units. However another officer by the name of First Lieutenant Takuya Shimamura had wanted to alter the past in order to change the modern times when they head back. But as the days go on, the platoons find themselves under constant threats from the Samurai, with most of the soldiers being killed individually in ambushes and surprise attacks by the former and later, by Ninjas. The rest were wiped out in a surprise attack against Iba's camp, after Shimamura had been executed by decapitation, by a combination of Archers and Arquebusers.

In the end of movie, there only 2 survivor left . Miyashita from the Shimamura platoon live with his lover and the child together in the past time meanwhile another survivor, Sergeant Fukami Moe, had been able to return to the present after the same storm had brought her back from the Sengoku period. Unfortunately, she had lost most of her memory due to the traumatic experience that she had seen since most of her fellow soldiers and First Lieutenants Shimamura and Iba were killed in the Sengoku period, as well as being the only survivor when police had found her. Sergeant Moe, in the end, is seen to be a mute, wandering about the streets of Tokyo. Iba's wife mourns his death after his daughter discovers Iba's JGSDF Dog tags in a temple.

== Cast ==
=== Heisei period characters ===
==== Iba Platoon ====
- Takashi Sorimachi: First Lieutenant Akiyoshi Iba
- Eriko Sato:Sergeant (Medical Sergeant) Moe Fukami, who fell in love with Mitsuo Yamase
- Ken Kaido:Sergeant First Class Mitsuo Yamase
- Hiroyuki Ikeuchi:Master Sergeant Mamoru Kano who sides with Shimamura first and later join Iba, killed by Honda's forces
- Shunsuke Nakamura:Sergeant First Class (Reconnaissance Sergeant) Keiichi Kajimoto, killed while he was rescuing Omaki's family with Shimizu
- Shou Tomota:Sergeant (Reconnaissance Sergeant) Toru Shimizu, killed by Honda's forces
- Yasufumi Hayashi:Sergeant Yasuyuki Koda who sides with Shimamura first and later join Iba, killed by Honda's forces

==== Shimamura Platoon ====
- Atsurou Watabe:First Lieutenant Takuya Shimamura/ Ishida Jibu Shouyuu Mitsunari
- Hiroshi Fuse:Sergeant Shinichi Miyashita, who fell in love with Oaki
- Emiri Henmi:Sergeant First Class Yoko Naoi, killed while she was covering Shimamura's retreat
- Daijiro Kawaoka:Sergeant Hideo Ukita, killed by Fukushima Masanori(?) forces
- Kouta Kusano:Master Sergeant Michitaka Hayashi, killed while he was covering Shimamura's retreat
- :Arai
- :Kiriyama
- :Asada
- :Sergeant Toshio Kumazawa

==== On the tank ====
- Osamu Bonchi:Sergeant Major (Chief Tankman) Takeshi Inagaki, sides with Shimamura
- :Wakisaka, sides with Shimamura

==== On the helicopter ====
- :1st Lieutenant (Pilot) Toyohiko Egawa, sides with Shimamura and killed by Tasuke special forces
- :2nd Lieutenant (Copilot) Kengo Hiyama, sides with Iba, killed by Honda's forces
- :Sergeant First Class (Ground man) Minoru Kawagoe, sides with Shimamura and killed by Tasuke special forces

==== Other characters ====
- Ayako Kawahara:Kaoru Iba
- Yuuki Yagi:Yu Iba / O-rin
- :Koba killed with another fellow by Kobayakawa force's under Fukushima Masanori(?)'s leadership
- Kento Handa:Sergeant Masaya Kuroki, the 2nd soldier to die, killed by Fukushima Masanori's soldiers
- :Sergeant First Class Takayuki Matsumura, the first soldier to be killed by Ukita Hideie's(?) soldiers
- Asaharu Hasegawa:Sergeant Koji Muto, the 3rd to die in ambush

=== Keichō era of the Sengoku period characters ===
- Tatsuya Fujiwara: Kobayakawa Hideaki, the lord of Chikuzen, nephew of Kōdai-in
- Miho Shiraishi: O-shino, elder sister of Kobayakawa, niece of Kōdai-in
- :Yohei
- :Oyone
- Taro Ishida:Hiraoka Yorikatsu
- Noboru Mitsuya: Old man

==== The Western people ====
- Naoto Takenaka: Ishida Mitsunari, the fox
- Kumiko Akiyoshi: Lady Yodo
- : Toyotomi Hideyori
- Hiroki Matsukata: Shima Sakon Kazutake, Ishida Mitsunari's chief retainer
- :Mōri Terumoto
- :Ukita Hideie
- :Ōtani Yoshitsugu
- :Shimazu Yoshihiro
- Ai Maeda:O-maki, who fell in love with Keiichi Kajimoto
- Mayuko Iwasa:O-sen, who fell in love with Koji Muto
- Chikako kaku:O-aki, who fell in love with Shinichi Miyashita

==== The Eastern people ====
- Masahiko Tsugawa:Tokugawa Ieyasu/Tokugawa Naifu/Old racoon
- Yuko Kotegawa: Kōdai-in (Nene), lady Toyotomi, the regent's wife Tokugawa's concubine
- Hiroyuki Nagato:Honda Masanobu/ Namu Namu
- Kaneko Sayaka:Tasuke, a woman ninja/shinobi
- Keiko Oginome: Acha no Tsubone
- Kataoka Jyouzaemon

== Theme Songs ==
- Love to Say and Yesterday by Satomi (Aozora Records)

== Media Release ==
A DVD based on the show was released to the public on June 21, 2006. Aside from the inclusion of the series, it also had deleted scenes in it.

== See also ==
- Sengoku Jietai
- Sengoku Jieitai 1549
