= Rome, Sweet Rome =

Alternative history, military science fiction story

- Short story by James Erwin (under the alias Prufrock451)
- Country: United States
- Language: English
- Genres: Alternative history; Military science fiction

Publication
- Published in: Reddit post
- Publication type: Online
- Publisher: Self via Reddit
- Media type: Online
- Publication date: August 21, 2011

Chronology
—	Acadia

"Rome, Sweet Rome" is an alternative history and military science fiction short story by James Erwin, an American freelance writer and military historian. Posted online on Reddit under his handle Prufrock451 on August 21, 2011, it describes what might happen if a expeditionary unit of the United States Marine Corps were somehow transported back to the time of the Roman Empire under Augustus Caesar. The first few installments were published on Reddit, corresponding to the first eight days of the Marines' arrival.

Several years later, the hosts of the National Public Radio program Endless Thread call the short story "one of the most famous creative anachronism ever made by the Internet... an anachronism that was going to be huge, like a Ridley Scott movie huge,... plucked from obscurity, optioned by Hollywood, and then never to be heard from again."

== Background ==
The story was inspired by a hypothetical question Erwin had read on the social news website Reddit about whether or not a modern U.S. Marine battalion could completely wipe out the entire Roman Empire. Erwin, an author from Cedar Rapids, Iowa, and two-time Jeopardy! champion, responded to the question by offering online a short fiction account about how a unit of Marines accidentally traveled back in time and ended up battling with Roman legions during the reign of Augustus. Respondents to his post dubbed his story "Rome, Sweet Rome" and "demanded" more details. Erwin responded to their wishes and expanded on his original story, and with input from other Reddit users, eventually completed a short story. A growing fan base mocked up book covers, movie posters, and posted related music videos to YouTube. Others have created dramatic readings.

== Plot ==
The story is a fictional account of what might happen if a Marine Expeditionary Unit (MEU) of 2,200 men were to be somehow transported through time from their base in modern-day Kabul, Afghanistan to the time of the Roman Empire when being ruled by Augustus Caesar, appearing near the Tiber River in 23 BC with their full allotment of equipment - M1 Abrams battle tanks, bulletproof vests, M249 SAW light machine guns, M16A4 rifles, and grenades, but with no way to resupply with fuel or ammunition when depleted.

=== Plot analysis ===
Popular Mechanics spoke with Erwin about his story concept of a modern Marine unit confronting Roman legions in battle, and then discussed the concept with Adrian Goldsworthy, an expert on Roman military history. In comparing a Marine Mechanized Infantry Unit, typically containing about 2,200 troops, along with associated artillery and vehicles, to that of the Roman legions, which at that time consisted of nearly 330,000 men armored in either heavy leather or in metal, carrying swords and javelins as weapons, and operating ballistae and crossbows as their long distance weapons, Goldsworthy noted that Roman armor would be useless against rifle rounds and grenades:

Obviously, there is a massive difference in firepower." He expanded that, while Marines would begin with a huge advantage, their inability to be resupplied as they depleted their ammunition and fuel would result, after a few days of devastating the Romans, in a complete reversal of fortune. The original advantage of superior technology would vanish and the Marines would then have to deal with a massively superior opposing force after themselves being reduced to that force's level of weapon technology. Goldsworthy concluded in his analysis, that without resupply and in lacking access to modern navigation aids such as GPS, the Marines would lose over the long term. He granted, however, that modern knowledge of strategy and tactics could allow a knowledgeable, mobile, and quickly-moving Marine force to "destabilize the Roman Empire, encourage civil war, and initiate regional fracturing.

Since they nonetheless would lack the necessary manpower, the Marines could not expect to "control Rome itself—with a population of a million or so—let alone the wider empire."

== Film adaptation ==
Among those who read the story online was Adam Kolbrenner of Beverly Hills-based production company Madhouse Entertainment. Liking the story concept, he made a deal to represent Erwin and then optioned the movie rights to Warner Bros. Erwin was hired to write the first version of the screenplay. Gianni Nunnari, founder and owner of Hollywood Gang Productions and producer of the action adventure motion pictures 300 and Immortals, had been announced as co-producer of the project.

The film was to be produced by Kolbrenner and Nunnari, with Robyn Meisinger as executive producer. John Ridley, also of Hollywood Gang, was slated to oversee the project for the company.

In 2013, Warner Brothers hired screenwriter Brian Miller to rewrite the script. Miller was the writer for the film Apollo 18, his most significant writing and production credit at that time. Other than the general concept, Miller did not use Erwin's work as the basis for his script. In Miller's version of the story, U.S. Special Forces would replace the Marine unit as the modern time-traveling fighting force.

By 2018, the screenplay had been languishing in development hell for five years since the most recent script rewrite of 2013 and has yet to be picked up for further development.

=== Licensing issues ===
Techdirt reported that due to Reddit's licensing terms, Erwin may not have had full ownership of the story he wrote, and may not have been able to fully transfer those rights to Warner Bros. Concerns were raised due to Erwin's creation of the story in the Reddit forums occurring with and through participation and input from other Reddit users. The issues then became those of whether or not Erwin had the right to grant exclusivity to Warner, and that Reddit may own rights to those portions of the story created and shared on their website. While the concept of modern military forces involving themselves in conflicts with less advanced cultures is a common theme in science fiction (e.g., G.I. Samurai), in order to claim exclusivity, Erwin may have been required to rewrite the story to remove those portions created through input of Reddit users.

On October 21, 2011, Reddit administrators explained that the licensing terms were designed to protect the site from potential legal action, and that they did not intend to block the production of the movie.

== See also ==
Time travel and warfare:

- The Guns of the South – 1992 novel by Harry Turtledove
- Nantucket series – Alternate history trilogy written by S. M. Stirling
- Lest Darkness Fall – 1941 novel by L. Sprague de Camp
- Les Visiteurs – 1993 fantasy film by Jean-Marie Poiré
- Timeline (novel) – 1999 novel by Michael Crichton
- Pax Romana (comics) – 2012 comic book by Jonathan Hickman
- 1632 (novel) – 2000 novel by Eric Flint
- The Final Countdown (film) – 1980 film by Don Taylor
- Zipang (manga) – Japanese manga series
- Time's Eye (novel) – 2003 novel by Arthur C. Clarke

Other literary works that were distributed free on the Internet prior to being discovered by Hollywood:

- The Martian (Weir novel) – 2011 novel by Andy Weir
