= Ninja Wars =

- Film poster
- Directed by: Kōsei Saitō
- Screenplay by: Ei Ogawa
- Based on: Iga Ninpocho by Futaro Yamada
- Produced by: Haruki Kadokawa
- Starring: Hiroyuki Sanada; Noriko Watanabe; Mikio Narita; Akira Nakao; Sonny Chiba
- Music by: Toshiaki Yokota
- Production company: Toei
- Distributed by: Toei
- Release date: December 18, 1982 (Japan)
- Running time: 100 minutes
- Country: Japan
- Language: Japanese

Ninja Wars (Japanese: 伊賀忍法帖, Hepburn: Iga Ninpocho) is a 1982 Japanese jidaigeki film directed by Kōsei Saitō. It is based on Futaro Yamada's novel of the same title.

== Cast ==
- Hiroyuki Sanada as Fuefuki Jotaro
- Noriko Watanabe as Kagaribi
- Mikio Narita as Kashin Koji
- Akira Nakao as Matsunaga Danjo
- Jun Miho as Isaribi
- Seizo Fukumoto as Sensei
- Sonny Chiba as Yagyū Shinzaemon
- Strong Kobayashi as Kongobo
