= Adaptations of Shinsho Taikōki =

Shinsho Taikōki (新書太閤記), a Japanese historical novel by Eiji Yoshikawa, has been made into a film, a TV drama and a stage play several times.

== Films ==
- Shinsho Taikouki: Ruten Hiyoshimaru (1953, dir. Ryo Hagiwara, starring Utaemon Ichikawa)
- Shinsho Taikouki: Kyūshū Okehazama (1953, Director: Sadatsugu Matsuda, Starring: Utaemon Ichikawa)
- Taikoki (film) (1958, Director: Tatsuo Osone, Starring: Kokichi Takada)

== TV series ==
=== 1959 version ===
A TV series with the same title as the novel was broadcast in 1959. It was broadcast in the Kanto region on NET (now TV Asahi) and in the Kansai region on Mainichi Broadcasting, produced by Mainichi Broadcasting.

=== 1973 version ===
Adaptations of Shinsho Taikōki
- Also known as: 新書太閤記
- Genre: Jidaigeki
- Directed by: Yasuo Furuhata
- Starring: Takashi Yamaguchi; Masakazu Tamura; Masahiko Tsugawa; Yoko Yamamoto
- Theme music composer: Naozumi Yamamoto
- Country of origin: Japan
- Original language: Japanese
- No. of episodes: 22

Production
- Producer: Kozuki Shinji
- Running time: 55 minutes (per episode)

Original release
- Network: NET
- Release: May 2, 1973 – September 26, 1974

This jidaigeki or period drama that was broadcast in prime-time in 1973. It is based on Eiji Yoshikawa's novel of the same title. The lead star is Takashi Yamaguchi.

==== Plot ====
The drama depicts the story chronicles the life of Toyotomi Hideyoshi and the people around him.

==== Cast ====
- Takashi Yamaguchi as Toyotomi Hideyoshi
- Estushi Takahashi as Oda Nobunaga
- Jin Nakayama as Akechi Mitsuhide
- Masakazu Tamura as Takenaka Hanbei
- Yoko Yamamoto as Kōdai-in
- Masahiko Tsugawa as Asai Nagamasa
- Kawarazaki Choichiro as Tokugawa Ieyasu
- Hajime Hana as Hachisuka Masakatsu
- Asao Koike as Shibata Katsuie
- Atsushi Watanabe as Watanabe Tenzo
- Hiroko Fuji as Oichi
- Sadako Sawamura as Ōmandokoro
- Yutaka Mizutani as Akechi Hidemitsu
- Kantarō Suga as Ashikaga Yoshiaki
- Akihiko Hirata as Hosokawa Fujitaka
- Joe Shishido as Nakagawa Kiyohide
- Juzo Itami as Araki Murashige
- Keizo Kanie as Katō Kiyomasa
- Daijiro Harada as Fukushima Masanori
- Nobuo Kaneko as Ankokuji Ekei
- Shinjirō Ehara as Takeda Katsuyori
- Goro Mutsumi as Hatano Hideharu
- Ryunosuke Kaneda as Saito Toshimitsu
- Sachio Sakai as Matsunaga Hisahide
- Kohji Moritsugu as Amago Katsuhisa
- Isao Natsuyagi as Yamanaka Yukimori
- Ryūtarō Ōtomo as Shimizu Muneharu
- Tomisaburo Wakayama as Torii Suneemon
