= Koji Kashin =

Japanese folkloric character

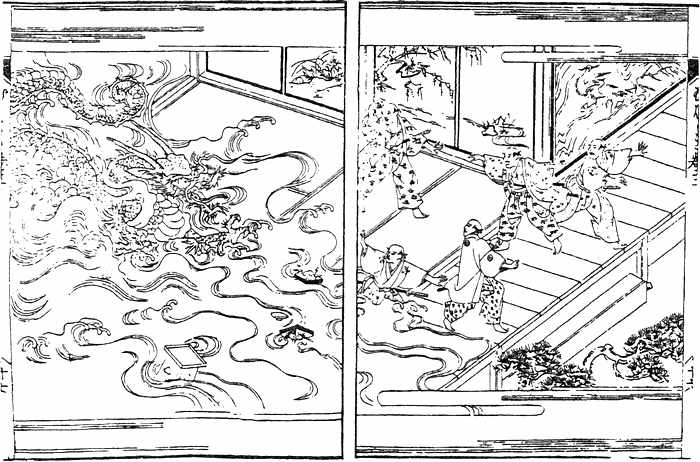
"Kashin Koji's magic", illustration from the Tamahahaki (玉箒木)

Kashin Koji (果心居士), also called Shippo Gyoja (七宝行者, Pilgrim of the Seven Treasures), is a Japanese folkloric/legendary character of a late Muromachi period magician. There are stories of him performing magic before Nobunaga Oda, Hideyoshi Toyotomi, Mitsuhide Akechi, Hisahide Matsunaga, and others, but his historicity is questioned.

== Life ==
According to the "Gizankokaku" (a book of desultory gossip stories) from the end of the Azuchi–Momoyama period, Koji was born in Echigo Province. Although he was initially a Buddhist priest at the Kōfuku-ji Temple in Yamato Province (or on Mount Kōya), due to his prowess in non-Buddhist magic, he was exiled.

One of his famous magical arts was throwing away bamboo leaves on the water surface (Sarusawa Pond in Nara Park), where the leaves would turn into fish and swim. When a man did not believe this magic, he used a toothpick to stroke the man's tooth, which dangled as if it would fall out.

Koji was especially close with Hisahide Matsunaga. Hisahide challenged Koji by asking: "I have experienced many dreadful scenes [on the] battlefield, but can you still make me feel scared?" Koji conjured the phantom of Hisahide's wife, who had died several years before, and frightened Hisahide.

In 1574 Koji attracted the attention of Nobunaga Oda with a lifelike kakemono. Oda wanted to buy it, while Kashin refused, naming the painting "priceless". After long negotiations Kashin sold the scroll for 100 ryō, and to the disappointment of Oda the painting disappeared off the scroll, because according to Kashin it was "no longer priceless".

A Japanese Miscellany by Lafcadio Hearn contains "The Story of Kashin Koji", in which some time after tricking Oda with the kakemono, Koji is invited to a party by Mitsuhide Akechi, drinks ten bowls of sake, summons a ship to come out of a drawing, and he boards the ship and disappears into the drawing.

In another version of Koji Kashin's disappearance, in June of 1584 he was called upon by Hideyoshi Toyotomi, and enraged the daimyo by exposing his never-told-anyone secret. This provoked Toyotomi, who ordered the crucifixion of the mage. According to a legend, at that time Koji transformed himself into a mouse and escaped, and an eagle carried him away in its beaks.

According to "Old Man's Tea Talk" (古老茶話), an essay by Ei Kashiwazaki (柏崎永以), during the Edo period, in July of 1612, someone named Koji Inshin (因心居士, the first character different from the one in Koji Kashin's name) appeared before Ieyasu Tokugawa in Shizuoka. Ieyasu, who already knew Koji, asked, "How old are you now?"and Koji replied he was eighty-eight years old. If this person was Koji Kashin, then it means that he was born in 1524.

According to the modern stage magician and wazuma practitioner Shintaro Fujiyama, the stories of Koji's tricks can be explained by the principles of modern stage illusion.

== In popular culture ==
Despite the historicity of Koji being questioned, he often appears in modern fantasy stories, as a hermit who waded through the troubled times of the Sengoku period, or a mysterious person like ninja. Some of the examples include:

- Blade of the Immortal manga.
- 1982 action film Ninja Wars, with Mikio Narita as Koji.
- Debuted as an Assassin-class Servant in Fate/Grand Order in 2023's "Fuun Karakuri Illya's Castle" event, bearing the appearance of a feminine mechanical doll. According to the game, Kashin Koji transformed Sugitani Zenjūbō into a woman to help him escape after Sugitani's historical assassination attempt against Oda Nobunaga failed, hence why Sugitani appears female in the game.
- A homonymous character in Boruto: Naruto Next Generations, a clone of (also homonymous with a folkloric figure) Jiraiya.
- The main antagonist in the 2020 video game Nioh 2.
- The Knife and the Sword manga.
