= Kumokiri Nizaemon (TV series) =

- Also known as: 雲霧仁左衛門
- Genre: Jidaigeki
- Directed by: Eiichi Kudo; Kōsei Saitō
- Starring: Tsutomu Yamazaki; Atsuo Nakamura; Renji Ishibashi; Shigeru Kōyama; Ken Nishida; Tetsurō Tamba; Sei Hiraizumi
- Narrated by: Masane Tsukayama
- Theme music composer: Shigeru Umebayashi
- Ending theme: Shigeru Umebayashi
- Country of origin: Japan
- Original language: Japanese
- No. of episodes: 15

Production
- Running time: 45 minutes (per episode)
- Production companies: Fuji TV, Shochiku

Original release
- Network: Fuji TV
- Release: November 29, 1995 – March 1995

Kumokiri Nizaemon (雲霧仁左衛門) is a Japanese television jidaigeki or period drama that was broadcast in prime-time in 1995 on Fuji TV. It is based on Shōtarō Ikenami's novel of the same title. It stars Tsutomu Yamazaki.

== Plot ==
In the Kyōhō period, there was a group of bandits called Kumokiri from the people of Edo. Tokugawa shogunate appoints Abe Shikibu a head post of the Hitsuke Tōzoku Aratamegata to arrest Kumokiri clan.

== Cast ==
- Tsutomu Yamazaki : Kumokiri Nizaemon
- Renji Ishibashi : Kinezumi no Kichigorō
- Atsuo Nakamura : Abe Shikibu
- Tetsurō Tamba : Tsuji Kuranosuke
- Hirotarō Honda : Kumagorō
- Naomasa Musaka : Tominoichi
- Takehiko Ono : Fukuemon
- Kōjirō Kusanagi : Echigoya Zenemon
- Kimiko Ikegami : Nanabake no Ochiyo
- Ken Nishida : Yamada
- Sei Hiraizumi : Okada
- Shigeru Kōyama : Matsuya Denbei

== Other adaptation ==
- Bandits vs. Samurai Squadron
