= Kōsei Saitō =

Japanese film director

- Born: 15 July 1932; Shimonoseki, Yamaguchi, Japan
- Died: 25 November 2012 (aged 80); Tokyo, Japan
- Occupation: Film director
- Years active: 1958-2010

Kōsei Saitō (斎藤 光正, Saitō Kōsei; 17 July 1932 – 25 November 2012) was a Japanese film director. He is known for directing the film G.I. Samurai.

== Selected filmography ==
=== Film ===
- Shayō no Omokage aka The Lonely Life (1967) (First work as a director)
- Sannin no Onna Yoru no Chō aka Night Butterflies (1967)
- Onna no Iji (1971)
- Akumaga kitarite fue wo fuku (1979)
- G.I. Samurai (1979)
- Ninja Wars (1982)
- Tsumiki Kuzushi (1983)
- Kizudarake no Kunshō aka Desperate Pursuit (1986)

=== Television ===
- Taiyō ni Hoero!
- Oretachino Tabi (1976)
- Lone Wolf and Cub (Second season)
- Choshichiro Edo Nikki (1983–1991)
- Unmeitōge (1993)
- Kumokiri Nizaemon (1995)
- Mito Kōmon series
- Sengoku Jieitai: Sekigahara no Tatakai (2006)
- Chushingura Sono Otoko Ōishi Kuranosuke (2010)
