= Sugitani Zenjūbō =

Japanese sniper

Sugitani Zenjūbō (杉谷 善住坊, d. October 5, 1573) was a Japanese sniper who is well-known for the assassination attempt on Oda Nobunaga during the Sengoku period.

== Life ==
=== Background ===
Little is known about Zenjūbō's origins, except that he was an expert gunner. Various theories exist based on his name and location. Among these theories are that he was a ninja of the Sugitani family, belonging to one of the Kōga's 53 Families (甲賀五十三家), which served the Rokkaku clan and allied with them during the Chōkyō-Entoku Rebellion (長享・延徳の乱) against the Ashikaga shogunate in 1487 and 1491. Other theories suggest he might have been the lord of Sugitani Castle in Komono, Ise Province (modern-day Mie Prefecture), a warrior monk of the Saika Ikki, or a bounty hunter of Negoro-shū.

It is said that he was skilled at shooting down flying birds according to legend during the late Edo period.

==== Events leading up to the incident ====
In the mid to late 1560s, Ashikaga Yoshiaki, the younger brother of the deceased 13th shōgun Ashikaga Yoshiteru, who was murdered in 1565, sought assistance from Asakura Yoshikage of Echizen and Rokkaku Yoshikata of southern Ōmi, but both refused to provide aid.

Then, in 1568, Oda Nobunaga responded to Yoshiaki's request in escorting him safely to Kyoto to become the 15th Ashikaga shōgun.

As Nobunaga's forces advanced toward Kyoto, they engaged in battles with several clans in southern Ōmi, including the Rokkaku clan. Yoshikata and his sons fled to Iga Province. Within two months, Nobunaga successfully removed opposition from the central region, ensuring the safety of the capital for the newly enthroned shōgun, Yoshiaki, before returning to his domain at Gifu Castle in Mino Province (modern-day Gifu Prefecture).

=== Assassination plot ===
In early 1570, Nobunaga launched a campaign to address the threat posed by Asakura Yoshikage. He headed north to Echizen Province (present-day Fukui Prefecture) from the capital. However, shortly thereafter, his ally, the Azai clan, who ruled over northern Ōmi, unexpectedly turned against Oda Nobunaga from the rear. This forced him to hastily retreat back to Kyoto, his Echizen campaign interrupted for the time being with the intention of regrouping at Gifu before the Azai-Asakura Alliance could gain momentum. Azai Nagamasa, his brother-in-law, obstructed the route through Ōmi Province, preventing Nobunaga's return to his home domains in Owari Province (present-day eastern Aichi Prefecture) and Mino Province.

With his retreat blocked, Nobunaga had no choice but to head westward into Ise Province by way of Chikusa Mountain, a province he had subjugated and pacified a year earlier, which bordered Owari.

Meanwhile, Rokkaku Yoshikata, under the alias of Sasaki Jōtei, had hired Sugitani Zenjūbō for the task of assassinating Nobunaga. It is said that this plot was purportedly devised by the Rokkaku clan to hinder Nobunaga's main route and lure him into a trap using the Chikusa Pass where the assassin was stationed.

On the 22nd of June, the sniper concealed himself by the wayside in the mountain as Nobunaga, accompanied by escorts, traversed Chikusa Pass. Zenjūbō took aim with an arquebus and fired a double shot from over twenty meters away. Remarkably, it resulted in only a scratch, and Nobunaga safely returned to Gifu Castle two days later.

=== Aftermath and execution ===
After the failed assassination, Zenjūbō went into hiding. He eventually sought refuge at Amida-ji in Takashima, Ōmi. In 1573, Isono Kazumasa captured him, and on October 5, he was brought to Gifu. There, he underwent a thorough interrogation before facing an unusual method of capital punishment.

Zenjūbō was buried upright by the roadside, with only his head and neck exposed. A blunt-edged bamboo saw was placed nearby for anyone who might pass by and cut away at his neck, resulting in a slow execution by beheading.

As an indirect consequence of the earlier mentioned incident, Oda Nobutada, Nobunaga's eldest son and heir, condemned Erin-ji, located in the Takeda clan's territory, for the crime of harboring Rokkaku Yoshikata's son, Rokkaku Katanaga (under the alias Sasaki Jirō), in 1582. On April 25, the temple was set ablaze, burning 150 people to death, as punishment for the offense that still echoed over a decade later.

== Impact ==
While assassinations were not unheard of in 16th century Japan, direct sniping was still exceedingly rare during that period. The first recorded assassination involving the use of a gun in Japan occurred several years earlier in 1566 when Ukita Naoie hired two rōnin brothers to kill the daimyō Mimura Iechika by shooting him to death in Bicchū Province.

Similarly, beheading by sawing was an exceptionally severe and uncommon execution method throughout Japanese history.

Both of these topics have attracted significant interest in various forms of media.

== Works featured in ==
- Ōgon no Hibi, 21st episode of the 16th NHK taiga drama (1978), role performed by Takuzo Kawatani.
- "Shūdōshi no Kubi" (1987), written by Motohiko Izawa.
- "The Man Who Shot Nobunaga" (2005), written by Mikio Nanbara (南原 幹雄).
- Ninja Girl & Samurai Master (2008), written by Naoki Shigeno (重野 なおき). In the 2016's anime adaptation, he was voiced by Eiji Takemoto.
- Debuts in volume 3 of The Ambition of Oda Nobuna (2010), written by Mikage Kasuga (春日 みかげ). He is voiced by Kenji Hamada in the 2012 anime.
- Appears in the first volume of "Sengoku Sniper" (2012) out of five volumes, written by Takumi Yanai (柳内 たくみ).
- "Shirakomaki: Sengoku no Kumo" (2015), written by Hiroshi Saitō (斉藤 洋). It tells of a story about Sugitani Zenjūbō's apprentice who takes revenge on Nobunaga.
- NHK's "Nobunaga's Smartphone" (2023) of the Smartphone series, played by Sugi-chan.
- Appears as an Archer-class Servant in the mobile game Fate/Grand Order (2023), voiced by Yūko Gotō and illustrated by Hideo Takenaka (武中 英雄). According to the game, Kashin Koji transformed Sugitani into a woman to help him escape after the assassination attempt against Oda Nobunaga failed, hence why Sugitani appears female in the game; however, he still thinks of himself as male.
- He appears as a character in the Nobunaga's Ambition series.
- Appears in the video game Assassin's Creed Shadows.
