= Rakudai Ninja Rantarō =

Japanese manga series

- Cover of the first volume

落第忍者乱太郎
- Genre: Comedy
- Manga
- Written by: Sōbē Amako
- Published by: The Asahi Shimbun Company
- Magazine: Asahi Shogakusei Shinbun
- Original run: January 7, 1986 – December 2018
- Volumes: 65
- Anime television series
- Nintama Rantarō
- icon

Rakudai Ninja Rantarō (Japanese: 落第忍者乱太郎; lit. "Failure Ninja Rantarō"; generally abbreviated as Rakuran) is a Japanese comedy ninja manga series created by Sōbē Amako in 1986. The anime adaptation, Nintama Rantarō, began broadcasting on NHK in 1993 and a side-story anime film Eiga Nintama Rantarō premiered in 1996. Several Nintama Rantarō video games have also been published since 1995.

== Plot ==
The series is set near the end of the Muromachi period. It is during the Sengoku period that the story takes place. By his father's recommendation, Rantarō enters the Ninjutsu Gakuen in order to study and become an elite ninja, but since joining and befriending Kirimaru and Shinbee, everything for him usually results in failure.

Ninjutsu Gakuen is an educational institution established in the mountains of the Kansai region. Because it is a ninja school, the exact location is kept a secret (which is really because the author had not thought of one). Students attend in grades 1 through 6, which are divided up into three classes: I-gumi, Ro-gumi, and Ha-gumi, based on the old order of kana (the Iroha). Male and female students attend separate classes.

Despite its detail in historical accuracies, there are also a considerable amount of deliberate anachronisms to provide humor, such as speech using katakana or the appearance of a vending machine, radio or a wristwatch. There are also many instances of breaking the fourth wall, in which a character will turn back or tear though a page to interrupt a scene or refer to specific volumes or pages, or sometimes interact with the author herself.

=== Characters ===
Many of the characters' names have been taken from names of places in the Kansai region, especially Amagasaki of the Hyogo prefecture, where the author lives, as well as the names of real people.

The main characters are:

Rantarō Inadera (猪名寺 乱太郎, Inadera Rantarō)
Age: 10, lives in Settsu province, Health Committee
An obedient and energetic boy with reddish hair and glasses. Despite being born into a line of poor, second-class ninjas, he is determined and constantly strives to be top of his class, though the opposite always tends to be the case. Although he has an awful astigmatism and must wear glasses, he is an exceptionally swift runner, having been able to run 100 meters in 10 seconds. Being a member of the health committee, he is often called "Fuun Kozou" (lit. bad luck boy) since this committee in particular is deemed unlucky and any student in it, as a rule, is said to suffer constant mishaps.
Kirimaru Settsuno (摂津 の きり丸, Settsu no Kirimaru)
Age 10, lives in Settsu province, Books Committee
One of Rantarō's friends, he is a boy obsessed with money, and will try to gain any amount, no matter how small. This often results in his amassing as many part-time jobs as he possibly can, which are sometimes more than he can handle and has to have Doi-sensei help him, with less than favorable results. He's also very thrifty because of this. He dislikes words such as "give" and "pay". One of the reasons for this is that he is an orphan, having lost his parents after his village burned down, leaving him with no other living relatives. He managed to pay his entrance fees with money earned selling bento boxes. He lives with Doi-sensei during breaks.
Shinbē Fukutomi (福富 しんべヱ, Fukutomi Shinbē)
Age 10, lives in Sakai, Tools Committee
Another one of Rantarō's friends, he is a short, pudgy boy with a constantly runny nose who loves to eat. In fact, his weight seems to increase after every break. In the beginning, he started out as a crybaby, but gradually grew accustomed to the lifestyle. He is not good at schoolwork. The reason he was made to attend Ninjutsu Gakuen was to help with his success as an heir, being the son of a rich merchant, but he does have advantageous qualities. In addition to being unusually strong, his sense of smell is greater than that of any dog. Under certain circumstances, his hair stands up straight and is stiff and sharp enough to be used as a lethal weapon.

== Publication history ==
Rakudai Ninja Rantaro was serialized in the children's newspaper Asahi Shogakusei Shinbun from January 7, 1986 to December 2018. Due to Sōbē Amako suffering a stroke in January 2019, a planned "Part 64" that was set to be serialized the following April was postponed and eventually cancelled. A "Mastepiece Selection" (傑作選) series consisting of past chapters was run by the newspaper in hopes the author would resume work, but she found daily serialization to be too difficult and the series ultimately ended. The 65th compiled tankōbon volume containing the last new chapters was released in November 2019 and the last "Masterpiece Selection" chapter appeared in Asahi Shogakusei Shinbun the following December 28.

JManga released an English-language version of the manga online.
