= List of The Ambition of Oda Nobuna episodes =

The Ambition of Oda Nobuna (織田信奈の野望, Oda Nobuna no Yabō) is a 2012 anime series based on the light novels written by Mikage Kasuga and illustrated by Miyama-Zero. The series follows high school student Yoshiharu Sagara, who finds himself in an alternative timeline during the Sengoku period. Having rescued Nobuna Oda, a teenaged girl version of his world's Oda Nobunaga, he helps Nobuna in her ambition to conquer and unite Japan under her rule.

The anime aired from July 9, 2012, to September 24, 2012, at 1:05 a.m. on TV Tokyo. The anime is jointly produced by Studio Gokumi and Madhouse and directed by Yūji Kumazawa, scripted and produced by Masami Suzuki and music by Yasuharu Takanashi.

The opening theme song is "Link" by Aimi and the closing theme song is "Hikari" (ヒカリ; "Light") by Makino Mizuta.

Names in this article are re-written in Western format, i.e. the given name appears before the clan name. In Japanese format, however, family name appears before the given name, a fact that English dub of the series (Sentai Filmworks) did not take into proper consideration.

== Episode list ==
| No. | Title | Original release date |
|---|---|---|
| 1 | "Nobuna and Monkey"; Transliteration: "Nobuna to Saru" (Japanese: 信奈とサル) | July 9, 2012 |
Yoshiharu Sagara finds himself in an alternate timeline in the Sengoku era, where some of the well-known warlords are female. Because of him, Hideyoshi Toyotomi dies, but he saves the life of a female version of Nobunaga Oda, named Nobuna Oda. As a reward, Nobuna makes Yoshiharu her retainer. But his claims of coming from the future brands him as crazy. Meanwhile, the lord of Mino, Dōsan Saitō, calls for a negotiation with Nobuna. Dōsan's servant, Mitsuhide "Jubei" Akechi, attempts an ambush which is foiled by Yoshiharu's foreknowledge. During the meeting, Yoshiharu convinces Dōsan to ally with the Oda clan by making Nobuna his heir. Nobuna, nonetheless, chases Yoshiharu with an unsheathed sword.
| 2 | "Intrigue in the House of Oda"; Transliteration: "Oda-ke, Oie Sōdō" (Japanese: 織田家、お家騒動) | July 16, 2012 |
Yoshiharu must purchase 8,000 koku of rice in a week with only 3,000 kan, or lose his head to Nobukatsu Oda, Nobuna's younger brother, who threatens to rebel if he does not receive the head. Using his foreknowledge of market prices, and with the help of Toshiie "Inuchiyo" Maeda, Goemon and Goemon's men, he manages to buy 30,000 koku instead. For the first time, Nobuna shows signs of having feelings for Yoshiharu. Nobukatsu rebels anyway, but Yoshiharu's guidance of troops subdues the rebellion peacefully by scaring Nobukatsu. Yoshiharu also prevents the execution of Nobukatsu, fearing that Nobuna would become a similarly ruthless ruler like Nobunaga. A grateful Nobukatsu changes his name to Nobusumi Tsuda and surrenders all claims on the Oda clan.
| 3 | "Upheaval in Mino"; Transliteration: "Mino Dōran" (Japanese: 美濃動乱) | July 23, 2012 |
Dōsan's three lieutenants and his son Yoshitatsu launch a coup d'etat. Nobuna cannot send military aid as the forces of Yoshimoto Imagawa are threatening Nobuna's borders. Nagamasa Asai proposes an alliance and reinforcement in exchange for a political marriage to Nobuna, which would undermine all Nobuna's dreams of unifying Japan. Ultimately, Nobuna's generals (Yoshiharu, Katsuie Shibata, Nagahide Niwa and Inuchiyo) in unison turn the offer down. Later, Jubei arrives with Dōsan's daughter, informing that Dōsan is preparing for his last stand. Yoshiharu and Goemon undertake a very dangerous rescue mission that after heavy casualties, would have failed had it not been for the arrival of Nobuna and her forces. As Nobuna berates Yoshiharu for his foolishness, everyone is soon informed that Yoshimoto and her army have invaded.
| 4 | "Winds of War: Okehazama"; Transliteration: "Fūun! Okehazama!" (Japanese: 風雲！桶狭間！) | July 30, 2012 |
Following the invasion of Yoshimoto's overwhelming forces, Yoshiharu attempts to locate her base camp and trigger the Battle of Okehazama, with the aid of Goemon, Inuchiyo, Nobusumi and Nobusumi's many female bodyguards. At the base camp site, however, ninjas led by Hanzō Hattori attack Yoshiharu's entourage. Hanzō severely wounds Yoshiharu, but he convinces Hanzō that his master, lady Motoyasu Matsudaira, need not serve Yoshimoto. After receiving Yoshiharu's information, Nobuna's forces launch a surprise attack on the drunk forces of Yoshimoto. Yoshiharu prevents the death of Yoshimoto by groping Katsuie, and then charms Yoshimoto into surrendering. Later, when Nobuna's troops cheer for their victory, Nobuna and Katsuie beat Yoshiharu and exclude him from the cheer.
| 5 | "Recruiting a Genius Strategist!"; Transliteration: "Tensai Gunshi Chōryaku!" (Japanese: 天才軍師調略！) | August 6, 2012 |
Nobuna's attempts to reclaim Mino is repeatedly foiled by Yoshitatsu's strategist, Hanbē. Yoshiharu, Jubei, Goemon and Inuchiyo are sent to recruit her. They find themselves in competition with Nagamasa. Meanwhile, the reclusive Hanbē is forced to appear before Yoshitatsu, who wants to make her his own concubine. To force her hand, Yoshitatsu keeps her uncle hostage. Yoshiharu and Nagamasa accompany Hanbē to Yoshitatsu's castle to buy time while Goemon and Inuchiyo rescue the uncle. After receiving notice from Goemon that her uncle is safe, Hanbē invokes magical creatures to defeat Yoshitatsu and his men. Having escaped, Hanbē, who is impressed by Yoshiharu's kindness and bravery, swears loyalty to him instead of Nobuna.
| 6 | "Sunomata: One-Night Castle"; Transliteration: "Sunomata Ichiya Jō" (Japanese: 墨俣一夜城) | August 13, 2012 |
Conquering Mino requires building a fort at Sunomata but Nobuna's generals repeatedly attempt and fail because of the nearby enemy garrison. Finally, the task is given to Yoshiharu, who has the foreknowledge of how Hideyoshi did it. Nobuna and Katsuie leads most of the Oda army to Kisogawa. Yoshitatsu's generals lure Nobuna's forces to a valley. Unbeknownst to them, however, Yoshitatsu has rigged the valley with explosives. Nobuna, however, manages to escape the death trap along with Yoshitatu's forces who feel betrayed and have defected to her. Meanwhile, Yoshitatsu discovers that Nobuna's action was a diversion tactic, as Yoshiharu, Hanbē, Jubei, Goemon, Inuchiyo and small force have set up a fort at Sunomata overnight. They barely manage to withstand Yoshitatsu's siege until Nobuna's forces relieve them. Nagamasa and his army try to interfere, but Nobuna's forces under Nagahide ambush him. Yoshitatsu is captured and Mino is taken. Nobuna spares Yoshitatsu's life, but unlike Nobusumi, he swears vengeance.
| 7 | "Nobuna Heads to the Capital"; Transliteration: "Nobuna Jraku" (Japanese: 信奈上洛) | August 20, 2012 |
Nagamasa returns begging Nobuna to marry him. After promising an alliance, Nobuna permits her sister "Oichi" to be Nagamasa's bride; except "Oichi" is Nobusumi dress up as a girl. Nobuna is sure that the disguise will not collapse by nightfall. Nobuna then starts her historic conquest of Kyoto, intending to install Yoshimoto as a figurehead shogun. Yoshiharu, Hanbē, Goemon and Inuchiyo are sent to scout the city ahead of time. The city is in the state of chaos. Most buildings are damaged or razed, and crime and disease are widespread. The palace is in control of the Miyoshi Three: Sakihisa Konoe, Sōkyū Tsuda and Gōsei Shōkakuin. Yoshiharu's entourage chances upon bandits who have kidnapped the Empress, Himiko, and rescues her. They also help protect Portuguese missionary Louis Frois and her bodyguard Bontenmaru from more bandits. During a tour of the city, Yoshiharu and Inuchiyo are stunned by a magic spell of Hisahide "Danjō" Matsunaga, who demands Himiko return to the palace. Himiko promises to comply in exchange for the lives of Yoshiharu and Inuchiyo being spared. Nobuna's army finally arrives, bringing order to Kyoto.
| 8 | "Sakai: city of Freedom and Riches"; Transliteration: "Ōgon no Jiyū Toshi Sakai" (Japanese: 黄金の自由都市・堺) | August 27, 2012 |
Konoe demands 120,000 kan for the imperial court to recognize Yoshimoto as the new shogun. As such, Nobuna and Yoshiharu travel to the neutral merchant city of Sakai to ask its trade union to contribute to their cause. However, Sōkyū Tsuda, convinces other union member to contribute only under one condition: Yoshiharu and Jubei must compete in a cooking competition. The winner takes the 120,000 kan. Nobuna achieves what she is after anyway, but Sōkyū Tsuda and the union leader, Sōkyū Imai, respectively bet on Jubei and Yoshiharu, the stake being Imai's monopoly on the city's takoyaki stands. Imai and Nobuna both expect Tsuda to bribe other merchants and rig the competition in favor of Jubei. Indeed, Jubei is announced winner even though the judges are impressed with Yoshiharu who uses mayonnaise on his takoyaki but finds Jubei's horrible as she cooked it too quickly. Imai feels the event went better than what he hoped as he has the better recipe. Jubei, however, who had taken the competition more seriously than she should, demonstrates too much arrogance and is surprised to see Nobuna's cold disgusted reaction.
| 9 | "Face-Off at Kiyomizu Temple"; Transliteration: "Kiyomizudera Kōbō" (Japanese: 清水寺攻防) | September 3, 2012 |
The Miyoshi Three orchestrate an elaborate plan against Nobuna and Yoshimoto. First, their counterintelligence compels Nobuna to send out her army to deal with a nonexistent threat, despite Yoshiharu's foreknowledge of its falseness. Then, a sniper kidnaps Yoshiharu to lure Nobuna into his crosshair and assassinate her. Meanwhile, Miyoshi troops attack Kyoto. Their leader, Danjō, teleports into Kiyomizu Temple and attacks Jubei. Despite being a swordsmaster, Jubei is no match for Danjō's magic. However, Yoshiharu's smartphone foils the sniper and Jubei manages to hold her ground until military relief arrives: Yoshiharu shields Jubei, Nobuna pins Danjō down, Hanbei counteracts her magic and an angry Bontemaru blasts away her recently arrived escort, while troops under Kirishitan lords and Louis rout the Miyoshi invaders. Fully defeated, and impressed with the persecuted Japanese sharing Nobuna's vision, Danjō defects. Later, Nobuna meets Himiko, a psychic who had read Yoshiharu's mind earlier when he took her hand. She knows about his time displacement, his loyalty, and also his soft spot for women.
| 10 | "Nobuna's Dire Peril"; Transliteration: "Nobuna Zettai Zetsumei" (Japanese: 信奈絶体絶命) | September 10, 2012 |
Nobusumi discovers Nagamasa is a woman. She had to hide her gender to become a ruler. She suspects that Nobuna knew this. Meanwhile, Yoshiharu is relieved when Nobuna departs to conquer Wakasa, which would scare the troublesome Asakura without forcing Asai to choose between loyalty to Oda or Asakura. He explains that Nobunaga made the mistake of attacking Asakura instead, and Asai betrayed him, bringing about the frightening events of the 1570 siege of Kanegasaki. Hanbē, however, reveals that this might be exactly what's happening as she sensed Nobuna lying to Yoshiharu. As Yoshiaru sets out to confirm that and warn Nobuna, Hisamasa Asai imprisons Nagamasa and takes over the clan, rallying troops against Oda. Sandwiched between two clans, Nobuna realizes that one of her retainers must sacrifice a rear guard to facilitate her retreat through the Kutski valley. Against Nobuna's wishes, Yoshiharu, Hanzō, Goemon's men and 500 soldiers form that rear guard and successfully rout the enemy advance guard. But as Nobuna rides to retreat, she is shot by the sniper.
| 11 | "Retreat of Kanegasaki"; Transliteration: "Kanegasaki no Nokiguchi" (Japanese: 金ヶ崎の退き口) | September 17, 2012 |
The bullet strikes Yoshiharu's smartphone, only stunning Nobuna. Yoshiharu's rear guard, however, is decimated. To deny the enemy Yoshiharu's head, Hanzō detonates a bomb on him. As such, when Danjō brings Nobuna out of coma, she is told that Yoshiharu and Jubei are pulverized. To keep her alive, Danjō gives her a motive: Revenge. Scaring away the Asai and Asakura in the battle of Anegawa, Nobuna comes very close to becoming the monster against which Yoshiharu warned, as she has Tennōji burned down to force out the Miyoshi conspirators. Her plan to attack the religious site of Mount Hiei, to hunt down the Miyoshi Three and Asakura, is met with heavy opposition from her generals, as such a sacrilege would anger the populace. However, when Konoe sends her the severed head of a Kikazaru statue and an insulting letter, Nobuna charges onward to kill Konoe on horseback while her generals and allies scramble after her.
| 12 | "Unify the Nation by Force"; Transliteration: "Tenka Fubu" (Japanese: 天下布武) | September 24, 2012 |
Nobuna's reckless charge starts a full-scale invasion of Mount Hiei from several directions with participation from all her allies. Konoe has explosives detonated to set Mount Hiei on fire, something he wants the public to see as Oda's military sacrilege. But his plan backfires, as the sacrilege shatters the Miyoshi Three alliance, leaving nothing between Nobuna and Konoe expect an abortive Yoshitatsu. Tsuda and Shōkakuin join force with Imai and Louis, and provide Hanbē with funds and support for a magic ritual. With Konoe dead, Nobuna has a romantic reunion with Yoshiharu, whom the bomb had never harmed. Jubei, also alive, had found him shot, nursed him and had coitus with him (something that Nene infers from her cocky attitude). Finally, Hanbē invokes a heavy rain on Mount Hiei, extinguishing the fire. Nobuna and her forces are welcomed by joyous citizens.
