= James Erwin (author) =

American author

- Born: Cedar Rapids, Iowa, United States
- Occupation: Author
- Writing career
- Pen name: Prufrock451
- Genres: history, science fiction

James Erwin is an American author. He has written several works of history and science fiction. He came to public notice by creating Rome Sweet Rome, a short story on Reddit which went viral and became the basis of a Warner Brothers screenplay.

== Personal life ==
Erwin was born in Cedar Rapids, Iowa. He attended the University of Iowa. He currently lives in Des Moines, Iowa. In 2009, Erwin was a two-time Jeopardy! champion.

== As an author ==
Erwin's first book, a historical encyclopedia about secessionist movements in the United States titled Declarations of Independence, was published in 2007. He worked as a technical writer. He wrote a second historical encyclopedia in 2010 but it was never published due to the sale of the publisher, Facts on File.

He came to public notice when he created the story Rome Sweet Rome, under the alias Prufrock451, in response to a question on Reddit. The story quickly went viral. Featured in national media, the story came to the attention of producer Gianni Nunnari, as well as the motion picture studio Warner Brothers. Warner Brothers bought a screenplay based on the short story, and Erwin became the subject of profiles and interviews in Wired Magazine, Time, FT, Popular Mechanics, and other media.

In 2013, it was revealed that Apollo 18 screenwriter Brian Miller had been hired by Warner Brothers to write a second draft of the screenplay. By 2018, the screenplay had been languishing in development hell for five years since the most recent script rewrite of 2013 and has yet to be picked up for further development.

Erwin parlayed his success into a Kickstarter campaign for his first novel Acadia.

== Bibliography ==
=== Novels ===
- (2014) Acadia, ISBN 978-0978501686

=== Nonfiction ===
- (2007) Declarations of Independence: Encyclopedia of American Autonomous and Secessionist Movements, ISBN 978-0313332678
- (2012) Facts on File Encyclopedia of U.S. Military Actions, ISBN 978-0816078424

=== Short stories ===
- (2011) Rome Sweet Rome
- (2013) Rising Sun, in Europa Universalis IV: What If? the Anthology of Alternate History, ISBN 978-9187687440
- (2014) The Khan, the Caliph, and the King, in Crusader Kings II: Tales of Treachery, ISBN 978-9187687570

=== Screenplays ===
- (2012) Rome Sweet Rome
