= Bandits vs. Samurai Squadron =

1978 film

- Theatrical release poster

Japanese name
- Kanji: 雲霧仁左衛門
Transcriptions
- Revised Hepburn: Kumokiri Nizaemon
- Directed by: Hideo Gosha
- Screenplay by: Kaneo Ikegami
- Based on: Kumokiri Nizaemon by Shōtarō Ikenami
- Produced by: Gin'ichi Kishimoto; Masayuki Satō; Shigemi Sugisaki
- Starring: Tatsuya Nakadai; Shima Iwashita; Kōshirō Matsumoto
- Cinematography: Masao Kosugi; Tadashi Sakai
- Edited by: Michio Suwa
- Music by: Toshiaki Tsushima
- Distributed by: Shochiku
- Release date: July 1, 1978 (Japan)
- Running time: 160 minutes
- Country: Japan
- Language: Japanese

Bandits vs. Samurai Squadron (Japanese: 雲霧仁左衛門, Hepburn: Kumokiri Nizaemon) is a 1978 Japanese film directed by Hideo Gosha. It is based on the novel Kumokiri Nizaemon written by Shōtarō Ikenami.

== Plot ==
Kumokiri Nizaemon, a former samurai, turns away from his warrior background and becomes the head of a band of thieves. He subsequently leads the group in a scheme to plunder the castle belonging to the clan he once served.

== Cast ==
- Tatsuya Nakadai as Kumokiri Nizaemon
- Shima Iwashita as Chiyo
- Kōshirō Matsumoto as Shikubu Abe
- Takashi Yamaguchi as Tsugutomo Owari
- Isao Natsuyagi as Kumagorô
- Hiroyuki Nagato as Kichigorô
- Rinichi Yamamoto as Shôzaemon
- Kunie Tanaka as Rikichi Komadera
- Shingo Yamashiro
- Tatsuo Umemiya
- Takuzo Kawatani
- Hideo Takamatsu as Yamada Tobei
- Tappie Shimokawa as Jihei
- Tetsurō Tamba as Kichibei
- Keiko Matsuzaka as Shino
- Junko Miyashita as Menbiki Okyo
- Ryōhei Uchida as Yomohichi Chiaki
- Mitsuko Baishō as Omatsu
- Mikio Narita
- Go Kato

== Production ==
- Yoshinobu Nishioka – Art direction

== Reception ==
Jason Buchanan at AllMovie says that director Hideo Gosha makes a "triumphant return to the samurai genre with this plot twisting, nerve shredding tale", but critic Alexander Jacoby calls it "a bland chanbara".

== Awards and nominations ==
21st Blue Ribbon Awards

- Won: Best Supporting Actress - Junko Miyashita

== Other adaptation ==
- Kumokiri Nizaemon
