= Samurai Commando: Mission 1549 =

2005 film by Masaaki Tezuka

- Theatrical release poster

戦国自衛隊1549 (Sengoku Jietai 1549)
- Created by: Ryō Hanmura (novel Sengoku Jieitai)
- Manga
- Written by: Harutoshi Fukui
- Illustrated by: Ark Performance
- Published by: Kadokawa Shoten
- English publisher: NA: CMX Manga
- Magazine: Monthly Shōnen Ace
- Original run: May 26, 2005 – December 26, 2005
- Volumes: 2
- Live-action film
- Directed by: Masaaki Tezuka
- Produced by: Kadokawa Eiga K.K.
- Written by: Harutoshi Fukui; Yasushi Matsuura; Kiyoto Takeuchi
- Music by: shezoo
- Studio: Toho
- Released: June 11, 2005
- Runtime: 120 minutes

Samurai Commando: Mission 1549, known in Japan as Sengoku Self-Defense Forces 1549 (Japanese: 戦国自衛隊1549, Hepburn: Sengoku Jieitai 1549), is a 2005 Japanese feature-length film and manga series focusing on the adventures of a modern-day Japan Ground Self-Defense Force (JGSDF) element that accidentally travels through time to the Warring States period of Japanese history.

Both the film and manga are based on Sengoku Jieitai (aka "Time-Slip" or "G.I. Samurai", 1979), an action film which starred Sonny Chiba as the leader of a JGSDF platoon sent back to feudal Japan.

The manga series was drawn by manga artist group Ark Performance. The scenario was written by Fukui Harutoshi, based on Ryo Hanmura's original novel.

== Plot summary ==
On March 10, 2003, the Japanese Self Defense Force conducts an experiment which is meant to shield military equipment from the effects of solar flares and EMPs with the use of electromagnetic shields. But something goes wrong, and all soldiers assigned to the test suddenly find themselves stranded on a battlefield in the Sengoku period (the year 1549) and under attack by a samurai army. When the first men are killed, the unit retaliates with its formidable arsenal. 74 hours later, a reverse effect occurs, and a wounded samurai warrior suddenly appears in the 21st century.

Two years later, former JSDF First Lieutenant and now world-weary restaurant owner Yusuke Kashima (Yōsuke Eguchi) is approached by Major Mori (Katsuhisa Namase) and First Lieutenant Rei Kanzaki (Kyōka Suzuki), who inform him that his lost superior, Colonel Tsuyoshi Matoba (Takeshi Kaga), is actually stranded in the past and ask for his help. All over Japan, black holes have formed which threaten to devour the present; Mori and Kanzaki are sure that Matoba is altering history. Using the same conditions as before, a second team under Mori's and Kanzaki's leadership is to be sent into the past and recover Matoba's unit; Kashima is to act as an observer and liaison to Matoba. Kashima refuses to participate, but then Iinuma Shichibei (Kazuki Kitamura), the samurai who had appeared after Matoba's unit had been sent back in time, seeks him out and asks him what he is actually living for when he is not interested in saving the world. This challenge rekindles Kashima's interest, and he agrees to come along.

As the recovery team arrives, they rescue a youth by the name of Tosuke (Akiyoshi Nakao), but also come under attack by both samurai and modern weapons, and, with some help from Shichibei (whose lord, Saitō Dōsan, had allied himself with the attackers) they are quickly captured. The survivors are brought to nearby Mount Anmo, where a castle has been erected which bears somewhat improvised, but clearly anachronistic features like an oil refinery. Soon, they meet the leader of the army, Oda Nobunaga – who is actually Matoba, who has grown resentful of his own time period and intends to write Japan's history anew. Matoba has established himself as a warlord and assumed Nobunaga's identity after having killed him during one of his first battles. Now, using a battery from the magnetic shield as a kit-bashed nuclear device, he plans to make Mount Fuji erupt, thereby eradicating the Kansai region and establishing himself as supreme Shōgun. He approaches Kashima with the offer to participate, but the latter firmly refuses.

In the meantime, Shichibei learns that his lord has wed his daughter, Nōhime (for whom the young samurai seems to feel more than respectful reverence) to the warlord and that the new arrivals are to be executed. While Shichibei is wracked with self-doubt about the fate of his benefactors, his own experiences in the future and the duty to his lord, Tosuke manages to sneak inside the fortress, where he comes in contact with Nōhime. When she learns of his resolve, she encourages Shichibei to follow his own heart and secretly prepares to free the prisoners.

The next morning, Kashima is to fight Shichibei for the freedom of himself and his men, but before a deadly blow can be struck, Shichibei tries to convince his lord to turn away from Matoba. Just as Saitō Dōsan orders Shichibei's death, Tosuke uses a commandeered APC to provide the soldiers a route of escape and their weapons. They manage to snatch the majority of their equipment, but Major Mori is killed covering Kashima's and Kanzaki's escape, and Kanzaki herself is recaptured. With just about 21 hours left to return to their own time period, the surviving JSDF soldiers nevertheless decide to return to Anmo to stop Matoba. In the course of their planning, Kashima learns that Tosuke is actually Toyotomi Hideyoshi – a name which gives him hope for the future again. Soon, Shichibei returns to plead to his lord one final time and finally succeeds by appealing to a father's love for his daughter, while Tosuke is sent to the emperor for an official authorization to declare Nobunaga a traitor.

The next morning, Saitō Dōsan returns to Anmo with fake news that Kashima and the remaining soldiers are headed for Kyoto to ask the emperor for assistance. Taking the bait, Matoba has the majority of his forces move out. As soon as this is done, Kashima and a group of his men, assisted by Dōsan's samurai, conduct acts of sabotage and attack the castle guards. Kashima fights his way to Matoba, who is just about to launch the bomb, and finally manages to kill him, but the bomb is still set to explode.

As the oil refinery is destroyed, the explosion triggers an earthquake which destroys the castle. Kashima and Kanzaki are – along with the bomb – evacuated by helicopter and quickly brought to the point of entry, where Kashima hopes that the electromagnetic effects created by the time shift will cause the timer to stop. With only seconds to spare, they manage to return to their point of entry and are transported back to their own time; the time bomb is stopped and the present restored.

== Reception ==
The film is considered an example of a fiction based on "the violent creation of an alternate future out of an altered past", or, in another approach, of a "weird war story", with its blend of supernatural and sci-fi.

== See also ==
- Boshin War
