= G.I. Samurai =

- Japanese theatrical release poster
- Directed by: Kōsei Saitō
- Written by: Toshio Kamata
- Based on: Sengoku Jieitai by Ryō Hanmura
- Produced by: Haruki Kadokawa; Takeshi Motomura
- Starring: Sonny Chiba
- Cinematography: Iwao Isayama
- Edited by: Shinya Inoue
- Music by: Kentaro Haneda
- Production company: Kadokawa Haruki Corporation
- Distributed by: Toho
- Release date: September 17, 1979 (Japan)
- Running time: 139 minutes
- Country: Japan
- Language: Japanese
- Budget: $9 million

G.I. Samurai (Japanese: 戦国自衛隊, Hepburn: Sengoku jieitai; lit. Sengoku Self Defense Force), also known as Time Slip, is a 1979 Japanese science fiction/action film focusing on the adventures of a modern-day Japan Ground Self-Defense Force (JGSDF) and Japan Maritime Self-Defense Force (JMSDF) team that accidentally travels in time to the Warring States period (戦国時代, Sengoku jidai). The film stars Sonny Chiba, one of the top male Japanese actors of the time, and was based on a novel by Ryo Hanmura, a well-known writer of historical novels and science fiction. A remake was theatrically released in Japan in 2005 under the title Samurai Commando: Mission 1549.

== Plot ==
During a defensive exercise, a wildly mixed group of Japanese SDF forces with a tank, an APC, a patrol boat and a helicopter suddenly find themselves stranded 400 years in the past through a sudden time slip effect and under attack by samurai forces. Their acting commanding officer, Second Lieutenant Yoshiaki Iba, befriends and joins forces with Nagao Kagetora, the war leader of lord Koizumi. Seeing the SDF weaponry in action, Kagetora persuades Iba to aid him in his struggle for supremacy in feudal Japan.

In the meantime, however, Iba finds himself faced with the desperation of his men who want to return to their own time. Some make contact with the locals – one, Private First Class Mimura, even finds himself a consort who keeps following him – whilst others freak out, running away in a desperate attempt to return home, or rebelling against rules and restrictions and try to live as pirates. Finally, his force shrunk from 21 men to 11, Iba manages to calm his troops by telling them that by fighting history and thus creating a time paradox they might be able to return home. Iba joins Kagetora and fights by his side.

Finally, Iba and the members face Takeda Shingen's forces in battle. But their trust in their advanced weaponry costs them dearly: Shingen's forces outmanoeuvre them at every turn, the soldiers lose all their vehicles and major weapons, and five of them die on the battlefield. In a desperate attempt, Iba forces his way to Shingen's command post and kills him in a sword duel.

As Iba and his remaining men go to join Kagetora in Kyoto, the latter is put under pressure by his family and the Shōgun Ashikaga Yoshiaki to get rid of Iba. Reluctantly conceding, Kagetora intercepts Iba's group at an old temple. But as Iba prepares to kill Kagetora for his betrayal, Kagetora shoots him. The other soldiers are killed by Kagetora's archers, and Mimura's consort delivers the fatal blow to her lover.

Kagetora remorsefully buries Iba and his men with honors. In the end, only one of the members, Private Mokichi Nemoto, survives, who had left the group to help a boy and his family, whose father had been killed.

== Cast ==
=== Shōwa period characters ===
Commissioned Officers

- Sonny Chiba as Second Lieutenant Yoshiaki Iba (Commanding Officer of the brigade)
- Kazunaga Tsuji as Ensign Shōichirō Ono (Commanding Officer of the patrol boat)

Non-Commissioned Officers and Enlisted Personnel

- Raita Ryū as Sergeant Haruhisa Kimura
- Shinichiro Mikami as Sergeant Goichi Shimada
- Tadashi Kato as Sergeant First Class Hideo Shimizu (Pilot-In-Command of the helicopter)
- Tsunehiko Watase as Leading Private Hayato Yano
- Hiroshi Kamayatsu as Private Mokichi Nemoto
- Jinya Sato as Private Osamu Seki
- Kokontei Shinkoma as Private Kenji Hori
- Jun Eto as Private First Class Nobuhiko Ken
- Yoichi Miura as Private First Class Manabu Nonaka
- Akira Nishikino as Private First Class Koji Kikuchi
- Hiromitsu Suzuki as Private First Class Gō Nishizawa
- Koji Naka as Private First Class Taisuke Mimura
- Ryo Hayami as Private First Class Kazumichi Morishita
- Takuzo Kadono as Seaman Toshishige Suga
- Isao Kuraishi as Private First Class Masao Maruoka
- Kenzo Kawarazaki as Private First Class Koji Kano
- Ken Takahashi as Private First Class Masayoshi Hirai
- Akihiro Shimizu as Private First Class Satoshi Ōnishi
- Toshitaka Ito as Seaman Harumi Takashima
- Nana Okada as Kazuko Arai
- Hiroshi Katsuno as Track Coach

=== Sengoku period characters ===
- Isao Natsuyagi as Nagao Kagetora
- Haruki Kadokawa as Sanada Masayuki
- Hitoshi Omae as Kuribayashi Magoichi
- Kentaro Kudo as Ishiba Takehide
- Katsumasa Uchida as Asaba Yorichika
- Goro Kataoka as Tategawa Katsuzō
- Asao Koike as Koizumi Yukinaga
- Shin Kishida as Naoe Bungo
- Hirohisa Nakata as Kuroda Naoharu
- Hiroshi Tanaka as Takeda Shingen
- Hiroyuki Sanada as Takeda Katsuyori
- Hiroko Yakushimaru as Young Takeda Samurai
- Gajiro Sato as Foot Soldier
- Mikio Narita as Kōsa
- Mizuho Suzuki as Shōgun Ashikaga Yoshiaki
- Masashi Ishibashi as Hosokawa Fujitaka
- Miyuki Ono as Miwa
- Masao Kusakari as Masakichi
- Ryudo Uzaki as Ochimusha
- Ayako Honma as Old Woman
- Koji Iizuka as Shokichi
- Maiko Ōtsuka as Mai
- Kaori Taniguchi as Shokichi & Mai's Mother
- Noboru Nakaya as Yoshitaka Kujo
- Moeko Ezawa as Widow Yui

== Equipment ==
Initially, the producers approached the Japan Ground Self-Defense Force (JGSDF) for props and vehicles, but the army cut their support after reading that the soldiers went AWOL in the script. For that reason, old and sometimes out-dated equipment (like M3 submachine guns) had to be used. The tank featured in the movie was even built entirely from scratch.

The vehicles, including a tank Type 61 and a helicopter Sea King, continue to run despite there being no replenishing fuel supply in the 16th century – a logical problem which was resolved in the remake.

== Adaptations ==
- A film remake in 2005 was titled Sengoku Jieitai 1549.
- A four-episode TV miniseries called Sengoku Jieitai: Sekigahara no Tatakai was aired in 2006 by NTV, directed by Kōsei Saitō.

== Name of the movie in different languages ==
- Japanese: Sengoku Jieitai
- English: G.I. Samurai
- French: Les Guerriers de l'Apocalypse
- Spanish: Eclipse En El Tiempo
- Croatian: Vrijeme je stalo u 5 i 18
- German: Time Slip – Tag der Apokalypse
- Norwegian: Tidsstorm
- Russian: Провал во времени
- Cantonese: Zin3 Gwok3 Zi6 Wai6 Deoi6
- Polish: W Pułapce Czasu

== Home video ==
In the UK, the film was bundled with Golgo 13: Assignment Kowloon and The Bullet Train in The Sonny Chiba Collection Vol. 2 Region 2 DVD set by Optimum Home Releasing.

== In popular culture ==
- The film is indirectly referenced in the Japanese light novel series Gate as research material for JSDF countermeasures against the Special Region's Imperial forces, and fire rams and ambush trenches (both of which appear during the battle against Shingen's forces in the film) are made use of by Zorzal's forces during the later Imperial civil war.

== See also ==
- The Final Countdown (film)
- Axis of Time
- Zipang (anime)
- Red Shift (novel)
- The Guns of the South
- Heaven's Soldiers
- Rome, Sweet Rome
- Gate: Jieitai Kano Chi nite, Kaku Tatakaeri
- Kingmakers
