= Omura =

Omura (小村) or Ōmura (大村) are Japanese surnames, but may also refer to:

- Ōmura, Nagasaki, a city located in Nagasaki Prefecture, Japan
- Ōmura clan, a clan of samurai of Medieval Japan of the province of Hizen
- Omura's whale (Balaenoptera omurai), a species of rorqual about which very little is known
- Dacun, renamed Ōmura during Japanese rule, a rural township in Changhua County, Taiwan

== People ==
- Ōmura Masujirō (大村 益次郎, 1824–1869), a Japanese military leader and theorist in Bakumatsu period Japan
- Ōmura Sumihiro (大村 純熈, 1830–1882), the 13th and final daimyō of Ōmura Domain in Hizen Province, Kyūshū, Japan
- Ōmura Sumitada (大村 純忠, 1533–1587), a Japanese daimyō lord of the Sengoku period
- Ōmura Yoshiaki, a ruling head of the clan of Omura throughout the latter Sengoku Period of Feudal Japan
- Hideaki Ōmura (大村 秀章, born 1960), a Japanese politician and the governor of Aichi Prefecture
- Jim K. Omura (born 1940), an electrical engineer and information theorist
- Masanari Omura (大村 真也; born 1984), Japanese footballer
- Norio Omura (小村 徳男, born 1969), a former Japanese football defender
- Satoshi Omura (大村 智, born 1935), a Japanese microbiologist
- Seiichi Ōmura (大村 清一, 1892–1968), politician and cabinet minister
