= Ashura no Gotoku =

Ashura no Gotoku may refer to:

- Ashura no Gotoku (TV series), a 1979 Japanese drama series
- Like Asura, or Ashura no Gotoku, a 2003 Japanese film, a remake of the TV series
- Asura (TV series), a 2025 Japanese drama series
