= Ōmura Domain =

Japanese feudal domain located in Hizen Province

Ōmura Domain 大村藩
- Domain of Japan
- 1587–1871
- Mon of the Ōmura clan

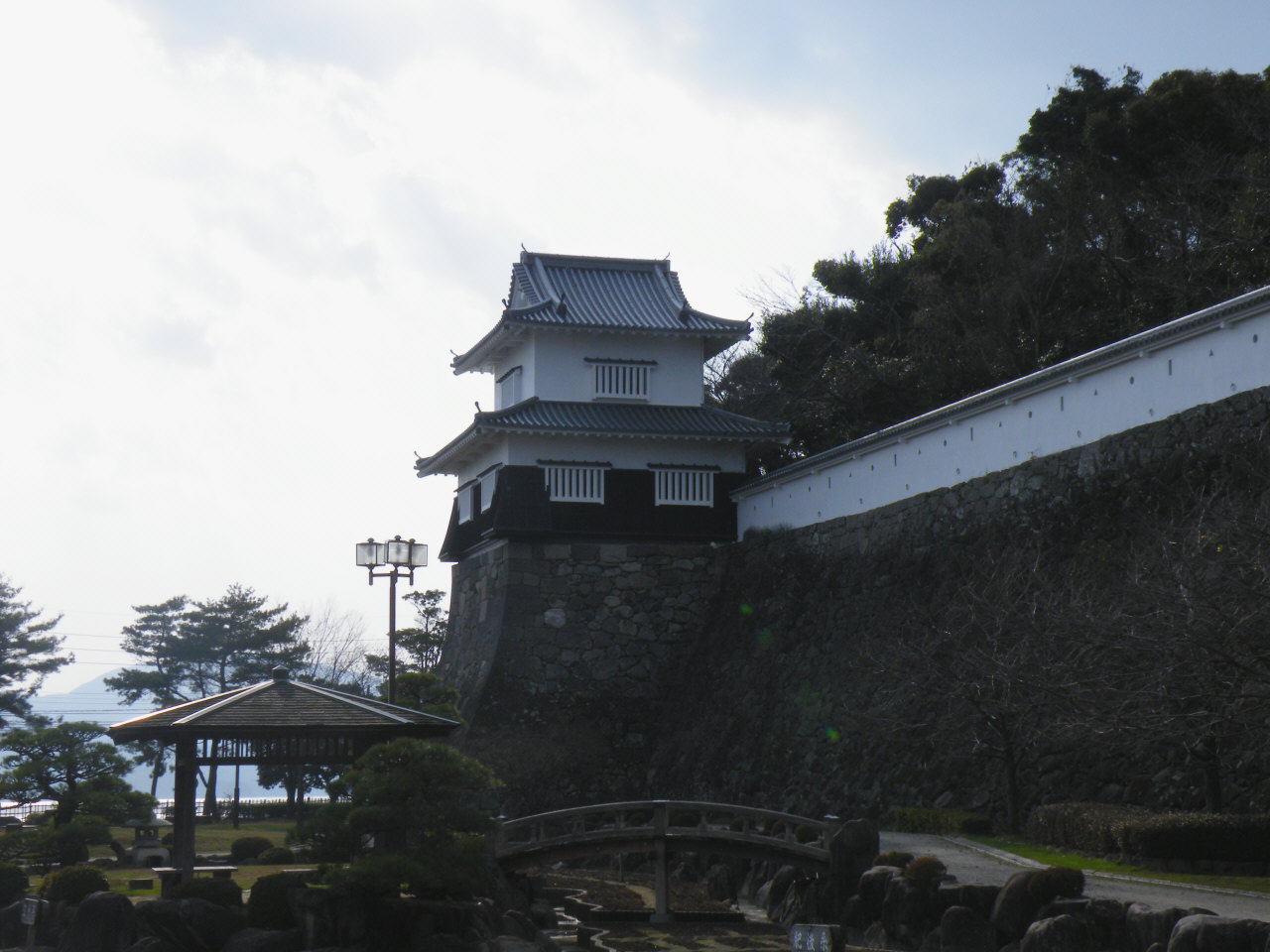
- Reconstructed yagura of Kushima Castle
- Capital: Kushima Castle
  - Type: Daimyō
- Historical era: Edo period
  - Established: 1587
  - Disestablished: 1871
- Today part of: Nagasaki Prefecture
- Location of Kushima Castle Ōmura Domain (Japan)

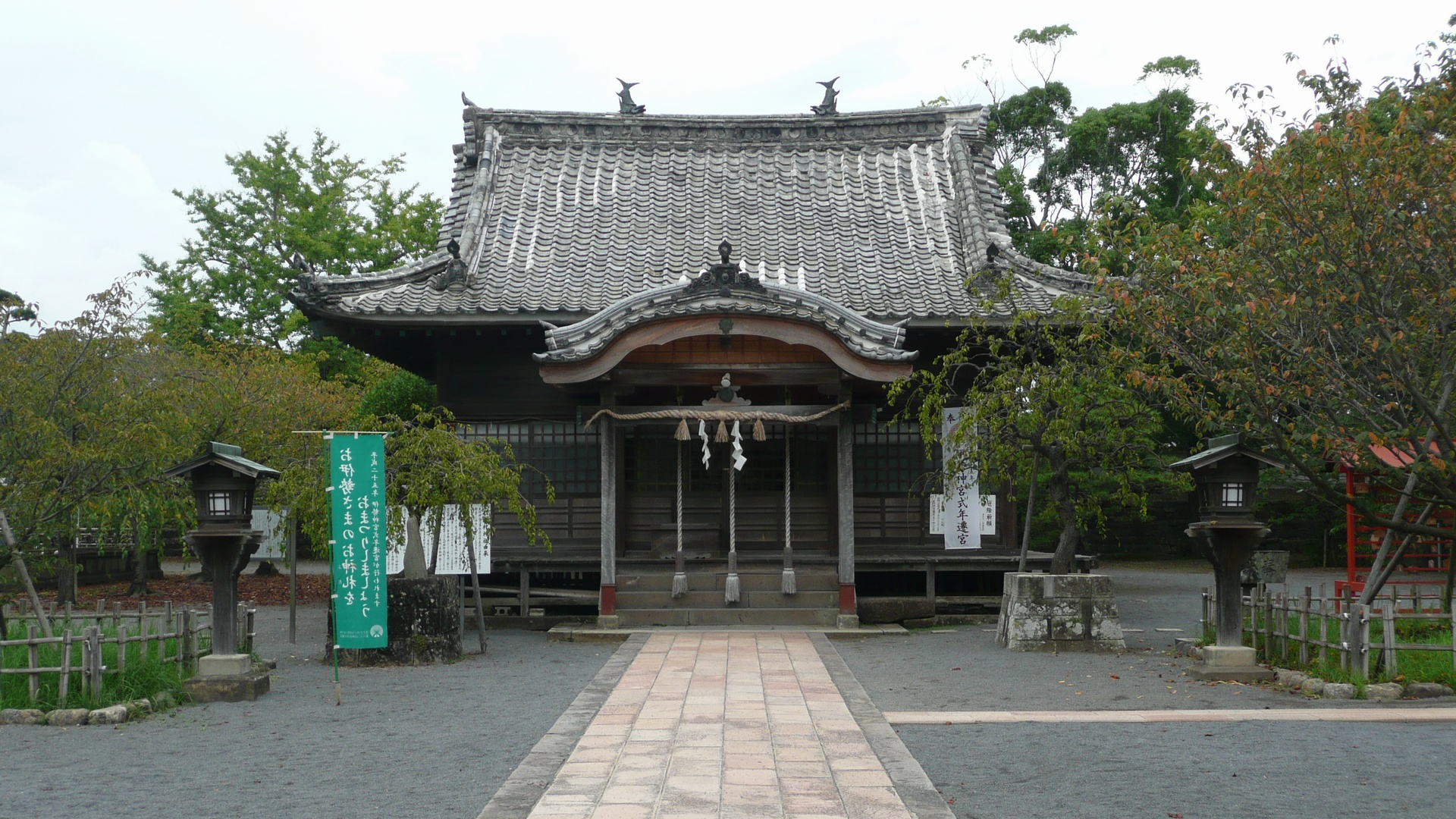
Front view of Ōmura Shrine.

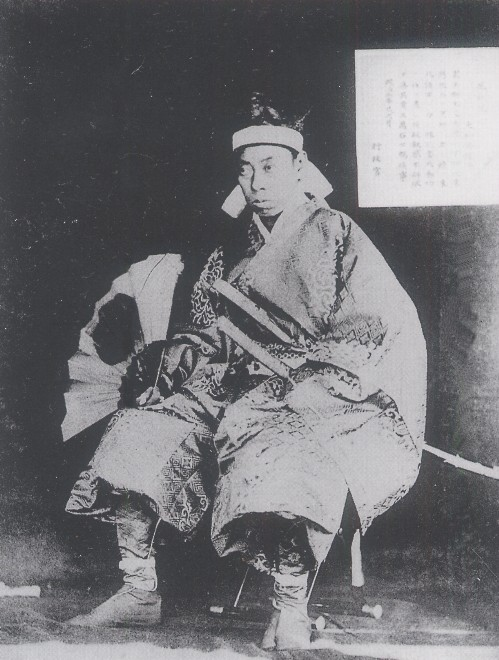
Ōmura Sumihiro, final daimyo of Ōmura Domain

Ōmura Domain (大村藩, Ōmura-han) was a Japanese domain of the Edo period. It was centered around Kushima Castle in what is now the city of Ōmura, Nagasaki and was ruled by the tozama daimyō Ōmura clan for all of its history.

== History ==
The lineage of the Ōmura clan, who ruled over this region, is somewhat obscure, although the clan claimed to have descended from Fujiwara no Sumitomo (died 941). From the late Heian or Kamakura period, they were one of several military families that had roots in the 11th century in Hizen Province on the island of Kyushu. The clan is notable for being the first daimyo family in Japan to convert to Christianity in 1562.

Ōmura Sumitada, believed to be the 12th head of the clan, offered Yokoseura (now Saikai, Nagasaki) to the Portuguese in 1561, and Nagasaki in 1570, and Nagasaki developed into a center of Nanban trade, which was a major source of the clan's revenues. In 1580, he donated the area around Nagasaki Port to the Society of Jesus as an ecclesiastical territory, further solidifying the clan's ties to the Church. He sent his eldest son Ōmura Yoshiaki to aid Toyotomi Hideyoshi's subjugation of Kyushu in 1587. However, although the Toyotomi regime confirmed him in the majority of his territories in northern Kyushu, it took the port of Nagasaki under direct control, and the clan lost its trade profits. Yoshiaki fought on the side of the Eastern Army at the 1600 Battle of Sekigahara against the Toyotomi, and was reconfirmed in his holdings by the Tokugawa shogunate. The domain is thus one of the few domains which managed to retain its territorial status from ancient times and was not subject to any transfers until the Meiji Restoration. Consequently, during the Edo period, it had many vassals in relation to its nominal kokudaka of 27,500 koku. These vassals were not concentrated in the castle town, and approximately two-thirds of them resided in various villages rather than in Ōmura itself.

Ōmura Yoshiaki's son Sumiyori died suddenly at the age of 28 in 1619, and the clan was in danger of attainder as he had no heir. Sumiyori did have an illegitimate son, but for unknown reasons, he ordered the child to be aborted. However, his chief retainer secretly allowed the child, Matsuchiyo, to survive. The Ōmura clan pretended that Sumiyori had adopted Matsuchiyo as his official heir. In the land survey of 1631, the actual kokudaka was calculated to be 42,730 koku, although its the domain's direct kokudaka was 23,322 koku. However, the domain was also required to pay for garrisoning Nagasaki, and the domain's finances were also strained due to expenses in Edo.

In 1657, many Kakure Kirishitan were discovered and arrested in three villages in the northern part of the domain. This incident occurred 45 years after the official ban on Christianity, and was a major incident that threatened the survival of the domain. However, the domain was not punished because it immediately reported the incident to the shogunate.

Ōmura, which has a lot of terrain that is not suitable for paddy field cultivation, introduced sweet potatoes as a daily food ingredient in the first half of the 18th century, along with Satsuma Domain. As a result, the damage caused by the Great Kyōhō famine was relatively minor. In 1721, the population of the Ōmura Domain was around 65,000, but by 1856, the population had increased 1.8 times to 117,300.

During the Bakumatsu period, Ōmura Domain was largely divided between those who supported the shogunate and those who supported the emperor. In 1862, when the final daimyō, Ōmura Sumihiro became the Nagasaki bugyō, the pro-shogunate faction rose to power, while the pro-imperial faction formed the "Reformist Alliance". In 1864, Sumiyoshi resigned from his position as Nagasaki bugyō, and the pro-imperial faction rose to power instead. In 1867, Matsubayashi Iiyama, the leader of the Reformist Alliance, was assassinated, and Hario Kuzaemon was seriously injured. This incident unified the domain's opinion in favor of pro-imperial and anti-shogunate faction, and an anti-shogunate army was formed. Afterwards, along with Satsuma and Chōshū, Ōmura played an active role as one of the central clans in the overthrow of the shogunate. In particular, just before the Battle of Toba-Fushimi, Ōmura Domain was the first to send troops to Ōtsu in Ōmi Province. Although the small number of only 50 men, this force prevented the shogunate's reinforcements from invading Kyoto. After the Meiji restoration, Ōmura Sumiyoshi received an increase 30,000 koku, which was second only to the 100,000 koku of the Satsuma and Chōshū domains and the 40,000 Chōshū of Tosa Domain. However, soon afterwards, with the abolition of the han system, Ōmura became "Ōmura Prefecture", which was later incorporated into Nagasaki Prefecture. The Ōmura clan was made a viscount in 1884 under the kazoku peerage system. Later, in recognition of their contributions to the overthrow of the shogunate, they were promoted to count in 1891.

== Holdings at the end of the Edo period ==
As with most domains in the han system, Ōmura Domain consisted of several discontinuous territories calculated to provide the assigned kokudaka, based on periodic cadastral surveys and projected agricultural yields.

- Hizen Province
  - 37 villages in Sonogi District
  - 1 villages in Takaki District

== List of daimyo ==
| | Name | Tenure | Courtesy title | Court Rank | kokudaka |
|---|---|---|---|---|---|
Ōmura clan, 1587–1871 (fudai daimyo)
| 1 | Ōmura Yoshiaki (大村喜前) | 1587–1616 | Tangō-no-kami (丹後守) | Junior 5th Lower Grade (従五位下) | 27,500 koku |
| 2 | Ōmura Sumiyori (大村純頼) | 1616–1619 | Minbu-daisuke (民部大輔) | Junior 5th Lower Grade (従五位下) | 27,500 koku |
| 3 | Ōmura Suminobu (大村純信) | 1620–1651 | Tangō-no-kami (丹後守) | Junior 5th Lower Grade (従五位下) | 27,500 koku |
| 4 | Ōmura Suminaga (大村純長) | 1651–1706 | Inaba-no-kami (因幡守) | Junior 5th Lower Grade (従五位下) | 27,500 koku |
| 5 | Ōmura Sumimasa (大村純尹}) | 1706–1712 | Chikugo-no-kami (筑後守) | Junior 5th Lower Grade (従五位下) | 27,500 koku |
| 6 | Ōmura Sumitsune (大村純庸) | 1712–1727 | Ise-no-kami (伊勢守) | Junior 5th Lower Grade (従五位下) | 27,500 koku |
| 7 | Ōmura Sumihisa (大村純富) | 1727–1748 | Kawachi-no-kami (河内守) | Junior 5th Lower Grade (従五位下) | 27,500 koku |
| 8 | Ōmura Sumimori (大村純保) | 1748–1761 | Danjō-shōsuke (弾正少弼) | Junior 5th Lower Grade (従五位下) | 27,500 koku |
| 9 | Ōmura Sumiyasu (大村純鎮) | 1761–1803 | Shinano-no-kami (信濃守) | Junior 5th Lower Grade (従五位下) | 27,500 koku |
| 10 | Ōmura Sumiyoshi (大村純昌) | 1803–1836 | Tangō-no-kami (丹後守) | Junior 5th Lower Grade (従五位下) | 27,500 koku |
| 11 | Ōmura Sumiaki (大村純顕) | 1835.–1847 | Tangō-no-kami (丹後守) | Junior 5th Lower Grade (従五位下) | 27,500 koku |
| 12 | Ōmura Sumihiro (大村純熈)) | 1847–1871 | Tangō-no-kami (丹後守) | Junior 5th Lower Grade (従五位下) | 27,500 koku |

== Ōmura Domain Ōmura clan cemetery ==
The bodaiji of the Ōmura clan is the Nichiren sect temple of Honkyō-ji (本経寺), located in the Furumachi neighborhood of the city of Ōmura, on the right bank of the Daijogo River that flows into Ōmura Bay, along the Nagasaki Kaidō road north of the castle town of Kushima. The Ōmura clan under Ōmura Sumitada was one of the first clans to convert to Christianity, and together with his son Ōmura Yoshiaki destroyed Buddhist temples and Shinto shrines throughout his domain. He also sponsored the Tenshō embassy to Europe in 1582. However, due to the Tokugawa shogunate's banning of the Christian religion and increasingly draconian punishments for remaining believers, Ōmura Yoshiaki apostatised, and ordered the construction of this temple in 1605. It was completed in 1608. Following his death in 1615, he was buried in the graveyard located on the southwest side of the main hall. This graveyard expanded to contain the graves of every daimyō of Ōmura Domain through the 11th, Ōmura Sumiaki, along with the graves of their wives, concubines and children, as well as the graves of many of members of the Matsura clan, who served as the karō of the domain. The graves of Ōmura Yoshiaki and Ōmura Sumiyori were built facing southeast in the northeast part of the cemetery, while the graves of the third to sixth daimyō were constructed to face these two graves across an open plaza in the center; however, by the 19th century there was no more room, so the open plaza was filled in with the graves of the ninth, tenth and eleventh daimyō. The cemetery is noted for its large number and large variation in grave markers. including kasatōba, gorintō and other styles. It was designated a National Historic Site in 2004 as the Ōmura Domain Ōmura clan cemetery (大村藩主大村家墓所, Ōmura-han-shu Ōmura-ke bosho). It is located is about five minutes by car from Suwa Station on the JR Kyushu Ōmura Line.

== See also ==
- List of Han
- Abolition of the han system
