= Sanshō Shinsui =

Japanese actor

Sansho Shinsui
- 深水 三章
- Born: May 5, 1947; Kumamoto Prefecture, Japan
- Died: December 30, 2017 (aged 70)
- Occupation: Actor
- Years active: 1978–2017
- Known for: Eijanaika; The Ballad of Narayama
- Height: 175 cm (5 ft 9 in)
- Spouse: Midori Hagio (divorced)
- Relatives: Ryūsaku Shinsui (older brother)

Sanshō Shinsui (深水 三章, Shinsui Sanshō; May 5, 1947 – December 30, 2017) was a Japanese actor.

== Biography ==
Shinsui's ex-wife was Midori Hagio. His older brother was director and actor Ryusaku Shinsui.

Shinsui once belonged to Tokyo Kid Brothers. After he left that, he launched the theatrical troupe Mr. Slim Company in 1975.

On 1978, he debuted in Nikkatsu's Roman Porno film, Jokōsei Tenshi no Harawata, which was scripted his brother. Shinsui appeared in many film noir.

He regularly acted in films by Shohei Imamura such as The Ballad of Narayama, Black Rain, and The Eel.

== Filmography ==
=== Dramas ===
==== NHK ====
Year	Title	Role	Notes
1979	Like Asura	Hidemitsu Jinnai	
1987	Dokuganryū Masamune	Kimura Shigenari	
1989	Kasuganotsubone	Katō Tadahiro	
1992	Onna wa Dokyō		
1992	Ude ni Oboe ari	Saegusafuji	
1994	Homura Tatsu	Mongaku	
1994	Jū-jihan Nemu Jiken jō	Mokubee Yoshida	
1994	Keyaki-dōri no Hitobito	Yoshiharu Maruyama	
1999	Genroku Ryōran	Tsuchiya Masanao	
2003	On'yado Kawasemi	Tatsuyoshi	
2011	Saka no Ue no Kumo	Tomoyasu chief	
2014	Dark Suit	Sohei Kaga	

==== Nippon TV ====
Year	Title	Role	Notes
1980	Taiyō ni Hoero!		Episodes 395, 420, 454, 490, 585, and 683
1994	Ienakiko	Keiji	
1999	The Resurrection of the Golden Wolf	Tetsuji Yuki	
2010	Hidarime Tantei Eye	Kozo Hira	
2013	Kumo no Kaidan	Norio Aikawa	
2013	Town Doctor Jumbo!!	Kenji Taizo	
2014	Tokkō Jimuin Minowa	Daisaku Minowa	

==== Tokyo Broadcasting System ====
Year	Title	Role	Notes
1988	Kitsui Yatsura		
1989	I Love You Kara Hajimeyou		
1991	AD Bugi		
1992	Zutto Anata ga Sukidatta		
1997	Enka Shōtarō no Ninjō Jiken Nisshi		
2000	Munakata Kyōju Series	Ryoko Iza	
2001	Tengoku ni Ichiban Chikai Otoko	Ayumi's father	
2002	Kochira Hon Ikegami-sho	Hideo Tozawa	
2002	Dai san no Jikō	Tadayuki Furusawa	
2002	Totsukawa Keibu Series	Miura	
2003	Nagareboshi o Gin! Jiken Kaiketsu Itashimasu	Koji Omachi	
2003	Gekai Reiko	Minoru Kuroda	
2003	Card G-men Akane Kobayakawa	Hitoshi Furuya	
2004	Manbiki G-men Yuki Nikaido	Iwao Iguchi	
2005	Dragon Zakura		
2008	Mitsuhiko Asami Series	Eiichi Takeuchi	
2009	Jin	Misumi Shunhitoshi	
2010	Mito Kōmon	Narumiya	Part 42, Episodes 1 and 5
2010	Kekkon Keikaken Aiko Yukawa no Kantei	Keiji Yamagishi	
2010	Obasan Kaichō Murasaki no Hanzai Seisō Nikki Gomi wa Koroshi o Shitte iru Series	Shinichi Otsuka	
2010	Tantei Susumu Samonji	Kunihiko Sasahara	
2011	Keiji Shoot Shūto & Muco no Jiken Nisshi	Haruki Sendo	
2013	Shugoshin Bodyguard Teru Shindo	Seiji Tonoyama	
2014	Alice no Toge	Shigeo Yokoyama	

==== Fuji Television ====
Year	Title	Role	Notes
1990	Onihei Hankachō		Series 2, Episode 4 and Series 9, Episode 1
1991	Zenigata Heiji		Series 1, Episode 5 and Series 4, Episodes 4 and 12
1992	Ni jū-sai no Yakusoku	Kenji Hasumi	
1996	Pure	Kunio Oya	
1996	Bijin Sanshimai on Senge Isha ga Yuku!	Jiro Kanai	
1996	Yonimo Kimyōna Monogatari	Keiji Shimazaki	
1998	Odorudaisōsasen Aki no Hanzai Bokumetsu	Manager	
1999	Emergency Room 24hours	Keiji Nikaido	
2001	Kenkaku Shōbai	Jindayu Noguchi	Series 3, Episode 1
2002	Hitoniyasashiku	Ken's father	
2003	Itsumo Futari de	Yasuo Mizoguchi	
2003	Mitsuhiko Asami Series	Eiji Inoue	
2003	sugarukaikyō Mystery Kōro	Ryoji Nishizaki	
2004	*At Home Dad		
2004	Rikon Bengoshi	Koichi Sonoda	
2006	Kurenai no Monshō	Masatoshi Kitahara	
2008	Ataka-ka no Hitobito	Hideo Udagawa	
2009	Arashi ga Kureta Mono	Daikichi Kanzaki	
2010	Hanayome Noren	Hiroshi Ishikura	
2010	Shokatsu Deka	Masaru Ishida	
2013	Oh, My Dad!!	Keiichiro Tsukui	
2013	Momeru Mon ni wa Fuku Kitaru	Hajime Yoneda	
2013	Hanshin Awaji Daishinsai Kara 15-nen Kobeshinbun no 7-kakan: Inochi to Mukiatta Hisai Kisha-tachi no Tatakai	Yoshiyuki Yamauchi	

==== TV Asahi ====
Year	Title	Role	Notes
1983	Tokusō Saizensen		Episodes 339, and 419
1984	Seibu Keisatsu Part-III		Episode 57 and Final Episode
1987	Bay City Keiji		
1995	Taxi Driver's Mystery Diary	Takashi Muto	
1997	Hamidashi Keiji Jōnetsu-kei	Makoto Yokoyama	
1999	Dōkyo Hito Couple no Satsujin Suiri Ryokō	Yohei Tamura	
2000	Gekka no Kishi	Jubei Koike	
2000	Trick	Kazuhiko Matsui	
2002	Hatchōbori no Nana-ri	Kenmotsu Sugito	
2003	Tokumei Kakarichō Hitoshi Tadano	Kimitsu	
2004	Sky High		
2004	Omiya-san	Yoshihiko Yamaoka	
2004	Ā Tantei Jimusho	Ando	
2004	Mystery Minzoku Gakusha Yakumoitsuki	Tadao Maenaka	
2004	Aibō	Hikoroku Furuya	
2004	Hagure Keiji Junjō-ha	Shuichi Nakagawa	
2004	Kenji Yoko Asahina	Takuji Nishimura	
2004	Omatsuri Bengoshi Goro Sawada	Haruo Tatsumi	
2006	Keishichō Sōsaikka 9 Kakari		
2007	Moto Rōnin Tsukikage Hyōgo	Iwane Mashiba	
2007	Seicho Matsumoto Ten to Sen	Keiji Hattori	
2007	Han'ochi	Tokihiko Katagiri	
2008	Inpei Sōsa	Ryoji Sekimoto	
2009	Seicho Matsumoto Seitan 100-nen Special Yakō no Kaidan	Bar master	
2009	Meitantei no Okite	Mana's father	
2009	Keiji Kazuyo Hiratsuka Hachibee no Shōwa Jiken-shi	Masaru Honda	
2009	Sono Otoko, Fuku Shochō	Shuji Narita	
2009	Untouchable	Ichiro Toyama	
2009	Onsen (Hi) Dai Sakusen	Keigo Satake	
2010	Rinjō	Koichiro Iwase	
2010	Kasai Chōsakan Jiro Guren	Hisho Iwaida	
2011	Kokuhatsu: Kokusen Bengo Hito	Nobuo Nakazato	
2011	Kariyachichi Musume	Shunpei Soda	
2012	Iryū Sōsa	Tamotsu Sagawa	
2012	Gyakuten Hōdō no Onna	Tatsuo Tanabe	
2012	Jiken	Mitamura	
2013	Onsen Waka Okami no Satsujin Suiri	Tatsuo Oshige	
2014	Otorisōsa-kan Shiho Kitami	Shosuke Someya	
2015	Kasōken no Onna	Kibun Tokiwa	
2015	Keiji 7-ri	Daisuke Kondo	

==== TV Tokyo ====
Year	Title	Role	Notes
2007	Vengeance Is Mine	Koichiro Sakomaru	

=== Films ===
Year	Title	Role	Notes
1978	Jo Takao Tenshi no Harawata	Tetsuro Kawashima	
1981	Eijanaika	Densuke	
1983	Karajishi Kabushikigaisha		
1983	The Ballad of Narayama	Chuyan	
1986	Kimi wa Hadashi no Kami o Mita ka		
1986	Kizu-darake no Kunshō	Hiroshi Kawahara	
1989	Black Rain	Nojima	
1991	My Soul Is Slashed		
1997	Parasite Eve	Shigenori Anzai	
1997	Kagerō 3		
1997	The Eel		
1998	Dr. Akagi		
1999	Coquille	Satoshi Kuroda	
2000	Colorful	Dr. Sawada	
2002	Totsunyū seyo! Asama Sansō Jiken	Suzuki	
2002	Sensen Fukoku	Akihiko Honma	
2003	13 Kaidan	Toshio Mikami	
2005	The Samurai I Loved	Sakamoto	
2010	Sakuradamon-gai no Hen		

=== Direct-to-video ===
Title	Notes
Shin Mājanhōrōki Series - Hengan	
Ma Suzumeoni Series	

=== Albums ===
Title	Notes
Rokudenashi no Sam	

=== Variety series ===
Year	Title	Network	Notes
1983	What a Fantastic Night!	NTV	
	Star Bakushō Q&A	NTV	
	Quiz Omoshiro Seminar	NHK G	
	Move	TBS	
