= Tokei – Adieu l'hiver =

Tokei - Adieu l'hiver
- Film poster
- Directed by: Sō Kuramoto
- Written by: Sō Kuramoto
- Produced by: Shigeaki Usami
- Starring: Ayumi Ishida; Tomoko Nakajima; Tetsuya Watari; Masumi Okada; Toshiyuki Nagashima
- Cinematography: Yonezô Maeda
- Edited by: Akira Suzuki
- Music by: Yukari Kaneko
- Production company: Fuji Television
- Distributed by: Nippon Herald Films
- Release date: October 10, 1986 (Japan)
- Running time: 116 minutes
- Country: Japan
- Language: Japanese

Tokei - Adieu l'hiver (Japanese: 時計 Adieu l'Hiver; lit. Clockwork - Goodbye Winter) is a 1986 Japanese film written and directed by Sō Kuramoto. Its plot concerns a five-year period in the life of a young girl whose parents were Japanese ice hockey and figure skating athletes at the Grenoble Olympics. It was Kuramoto's directorial debut and, to date, his only film as director. Fuji Television released the film on October 10, 1986. It stars Ayumi Ishida as the top-billed performer, in addition to Tomoko Nakajima as the protagonist. Ishida's performance earned her several major Japanese film awards.

== Premise ==
Tokei - Adieu l'hiver depicts five years (from age 9 to 14) in the life of Yuko Hayami (Tomoko Nakajima), a young girl whose parents were Japanese ice hockey and figure skating athletes at the 1968 Winter Olympics. The film shows Yuko's growth as a figure skater during this formative period of her life, aided by her mother Reiko (Ayumi Ishida).

== Cast ==
- Ayumi Ishida as Reiko Hayami
- Tomoko Nakajima as Yuko Hayami
- Tetsuya Watari as Jiro Takamatsu
- Kunie Tanaka as Master of Elegy
- Hideo Murota as Shinichi Kawai
- Minori Terada
- Masumi Okada as Satoru Koyama
- Toshiyuki Nagashima as Daisuke Kitani
- Eri Ishida as Fuyumi Akiyama
- Takanori Jinnai as Tatsuya Asakawa
- Midori Satsuki as Momo's mother
- Tomiko Ishii as Accompanying mother
- Guts Ishimatsu as Guard

== Production ==
The film itself took five years to make, in order to realistically depict the growth of Tomoko Nakajima, who played the lead character. The story's course was changed midway through filming because Nakajima's figure skating skills did not improve as expected.

This was Kuramoto's first and only film as a director. When it came to filming, Kuramoto was so worried about making passersby wait during outdoor shoots that he ended up urinating blood. Due to the stress involved, Kuramoto said he was determined never to direct again.

== Release ==
Fuji Television released the film on October 10, 1986. It was advertised using a series of three-line newspaper ads, usually reserved for missing persons advertisements, which sparked much discussion and debate.

== Awards ==
29th Blue Ribbon Awards

- Won: Best Actress - Ayumi Ishida

11th Hochi Film Award

- Won: Best Actress - Ayumi Ishida

10th Japan Academy Film Prize

- Won: Best Actress - Ayumi Ishida (also awarded for her performance in House on Fire)

== Home media ==
The film was released on VHS, but has never been distributed on any other physical format as of 2025.
