= Asura (TV series) =

2025 Japanese television series

- Release poster

Japanese name
- Kanji: 阿修羅のごとく
Transcriptions
- Revised Hepburn: Ashura no Gotoku
- Genre: Drama
- Based on: Ashura no Gotoku by Kuniko Mukōda
- Written by: Hirokazu Kore-eda
- Directed by: Hirokazu Kore-eda
- Starring: Rie Miyazawa; Machiko Ono; Yū Aoi; Suzu Hirose
- Music by: Fox Capture Plan
- Country of origin: Japan
- Original language: Japanese
- No. of episodes: 7

Production
- Executive producer: Hirokazu Kore-eda
- Producer: Yasuo Yagi
- Production location: Tokyo
- Cinematography: Mikiya Takimoto
- Editor: Hirokazu Kore-eda
- Camera setup: Multi-camera
- Running time: 55–67 min
- Production company: Bunbuku

Original release
- Network: Netflix
- Release: January 9, 2025

Related
- Like Asura

Asura (Japanese: 阿修羅のごとく, Hepburn: Ashura no Gotoku) is a Japanese streaming drama television series directed by Hirokazu Kore-eda. It is an adaptation of the 1979 series Ashura no Gotoku and stars Rie Miyazawa, Machiko Ono, Yū Aoi and Suzu Hirose. The series premiered on Netflix on January 9, 2025, to widespread acclaim.

== Cast ==
- Rie Miyazawa as Tsunako Mitamura, the oldest sister
- Machiko Ono as Makiko Satomi, the second sister
- Yū Aoi as Takiko Takezawa, the third sister
- Suzu Hirose as Sakiko Takezawa, the youngest sister
- Masahiro Motoki as Takao Satomi, Makiko's husband
- Ryuhei Matsuda as Shizuo Katsumata, a private detective
- Kisetsu Fujiwara as Hidemitsu Jinnai, Sakiko's boyfriend
- Seiyō Uchino as Sadaharu Masukawa, Tsunako's lover
- Jun Kunimura as Kotaro Takezawa, the four sisters' father
- Keiko Matsuzaka as Fuji Takezawa, the four sisters' mother
- Yui Natsukawa as Sadaharu's wife
- Naho Toda as Kotaro's mistress
- Kumi Takiuchi as Keiko Akagi, Takao's subordinate
- Kairi Jo as Hiro Satomi, Makiko and Takao's son
- Maru Nouchi as Yoko, Makiko and Takao's daughter
- Atsuko Takahata as Hidemitsu's mother

== Production ==
In November 2024, the series was announced on Netflix. Principal photography was concluded in 2024. The trailer of the series was released on December 16, 2024.

== Reception ==
Asura received unanimous acclaim, with reviewers from The Guardian and The New York Times calling it "the best Netflix drama in years," and "so good it makes other shows look bad."

On the review aggregator website Rotten Tomatoes, 100% of 12 critics' reviews are positive. Joly Herman of Common Sense Media gave the series a grade of five out of five stars.
