= Sanshō =

Sanshō may refer to:

- Sanshō (sumo) (Japanese: 三賞), three special prizes awarded at official sumo tournaments
- Sanshō (spice) (Japanese: 山椒), name of a plant, Zanthoxylum piperitum, also known as "Japanese pepper" or "Korean pepper"
- Sansho the Bailiff (山椒大夫, Sanshō Dayū), a 1954 film directed by Kenji Mizoguchi

People with the given name Sanshō include:

- Kawarazaki Sanshō (1838–1903), Japanese kabuki actor
- Sansho Shinsui (1947–2017), Japanese film and television actor

== See also ==
- Acmella oleracea, species of flowering herb sometimes called "Sanshō buttons"
- Sichuan pepper, Zanthoxylum bungeanum, not to be confused with the Japanese spice sanshō
- Sanshou, Chinese self-defense system and combat sport
