= Kushima Castle =

Kushima Castle 玖島城
- Ōmura, Nagasaki Prefecture, Japan
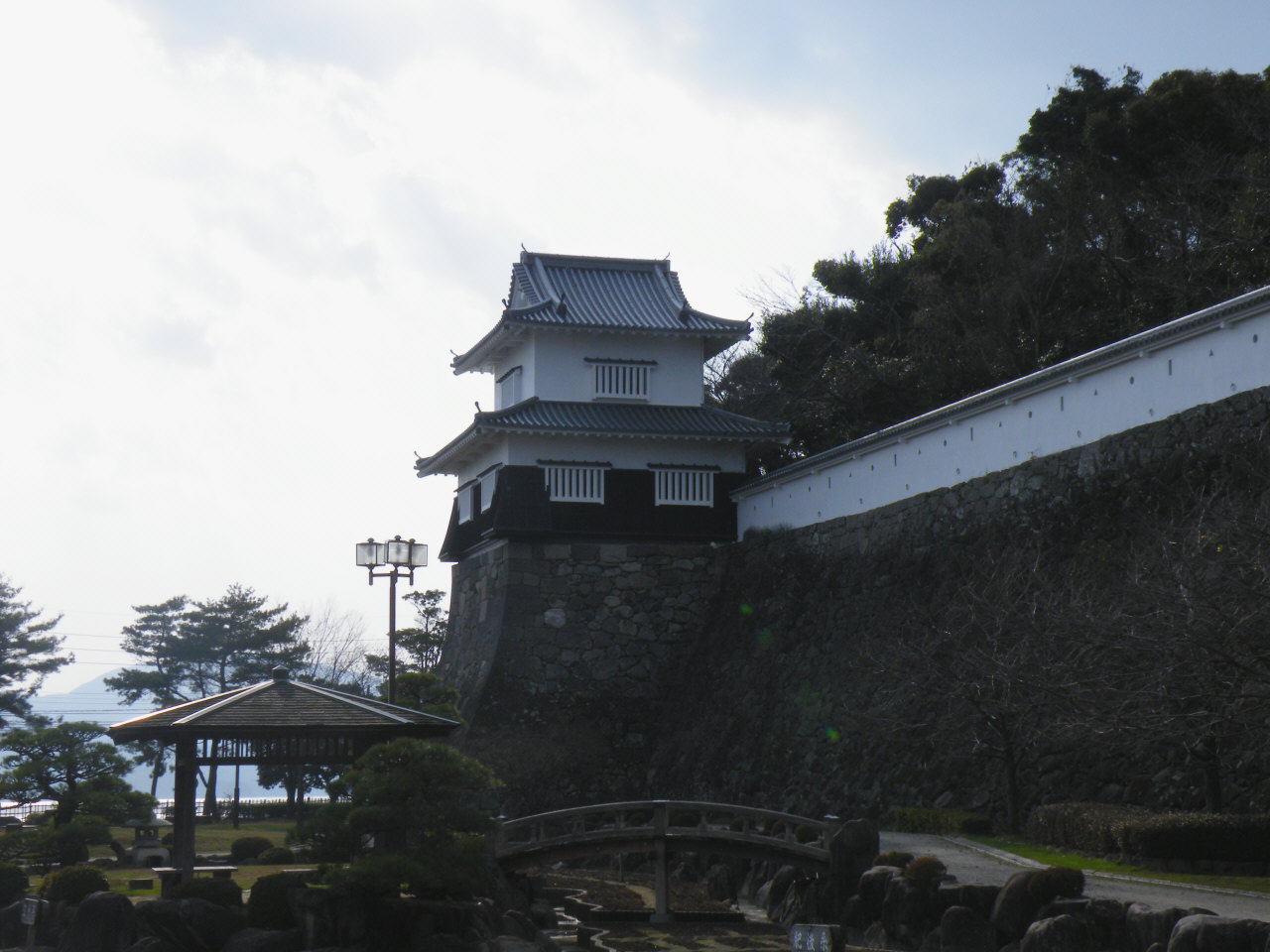
- Reconstructed yagura of Kushima Castle

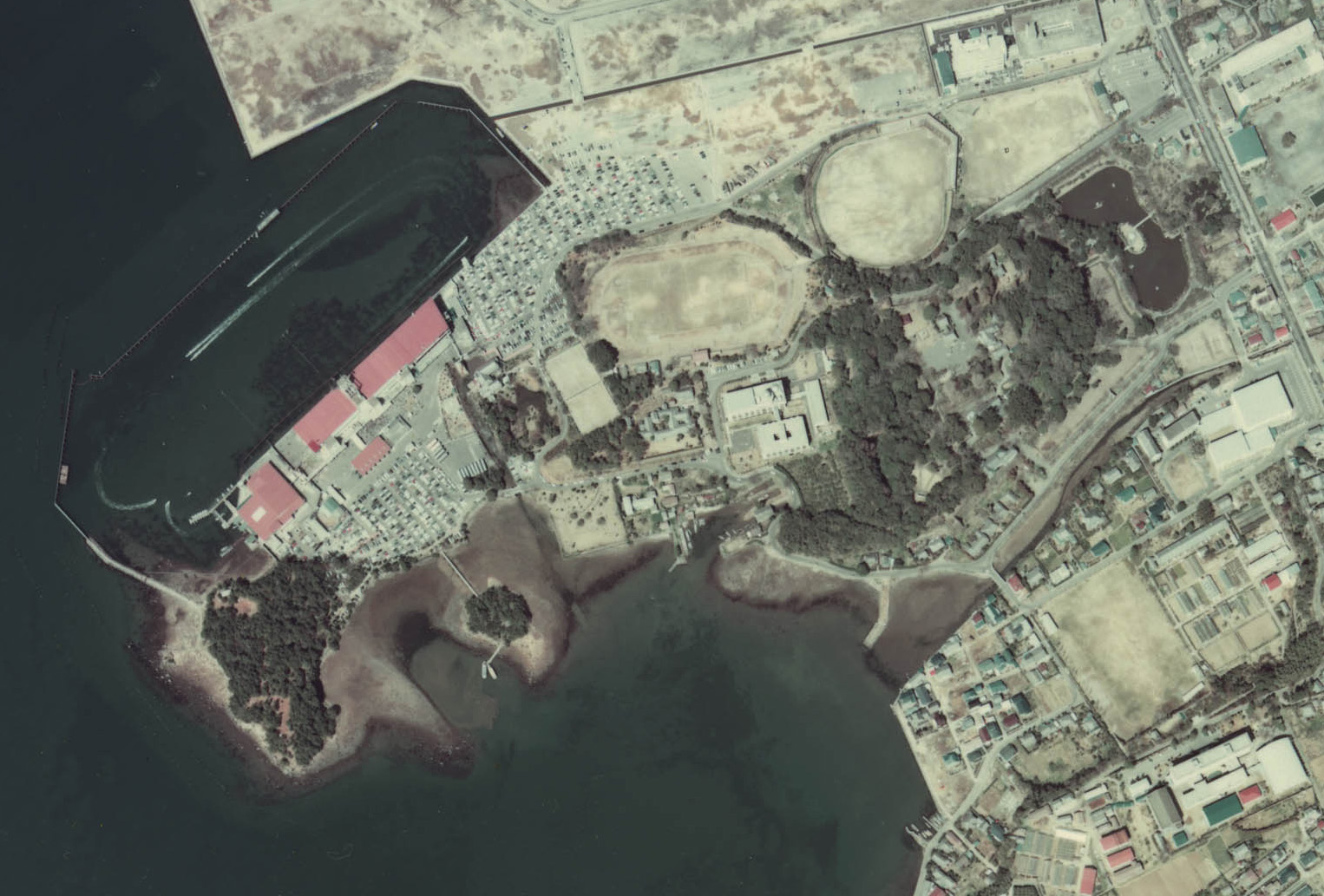
- Kushima Castle from the air

Site information
- Type: Hirayama-style Japanese castle
- Open to the public: yes
- Condition: ruins

Location
- Coordinates: 32°53′49″N 129°57′28″E

Site history
- Built: 1599, rebuilt 1614
- Built by: Ōmura Yoshiaki
- In use: Edo period
- Demolished: 1871

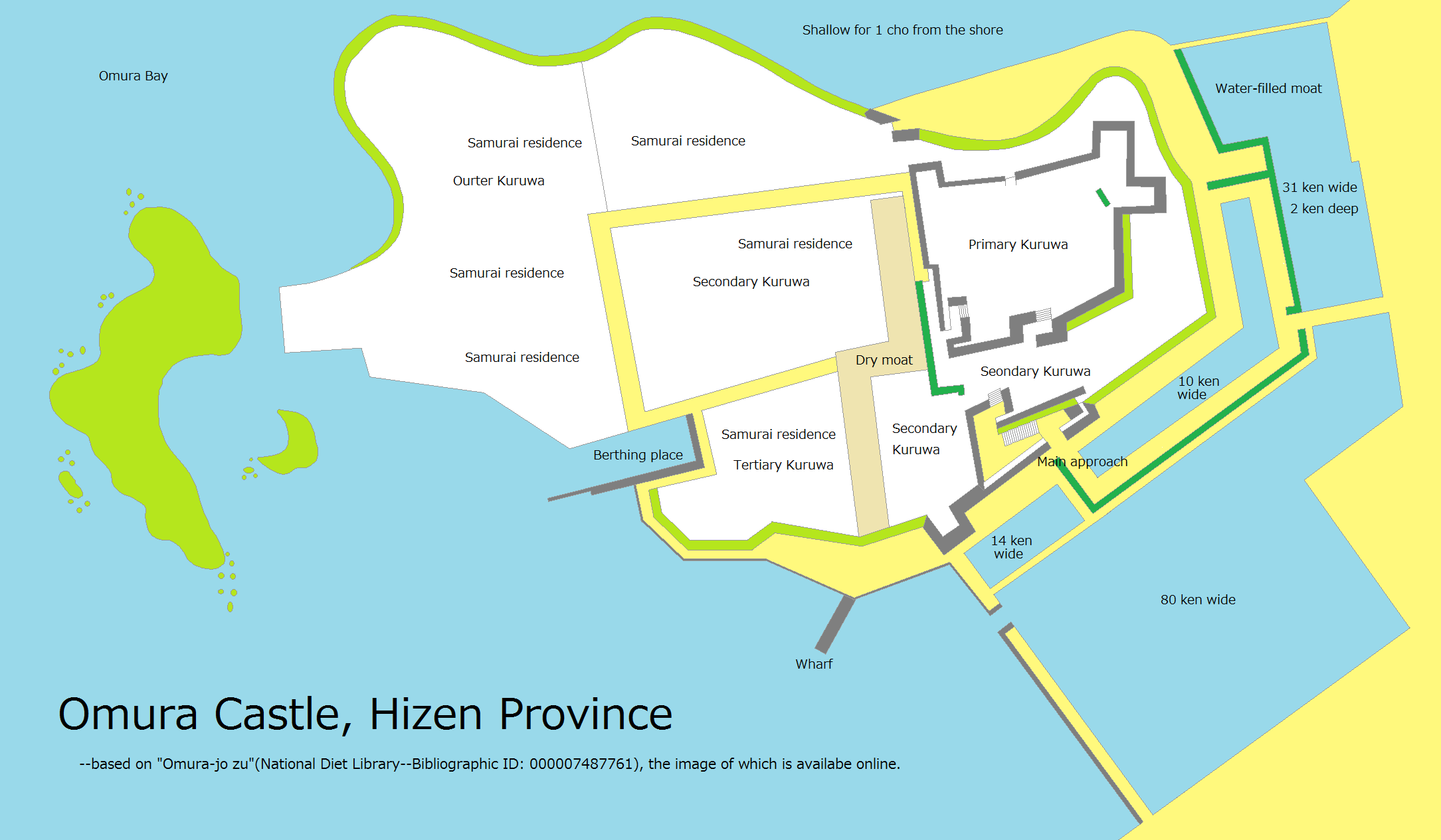
Omura Castle, Japan

Kushima Castle (玖島城, Kushima-jō), also known as Ōmura Castle (大村城, Ōmura-jō) from its location, is a Japanese castle located in Ōmura, Nagasaki Prefecture, Japan.

== History ==
Kushima castle is built on a peninsula extending into Ōmura Bay. Kushima Castle was the ancestral home of the Ōmura clan, having first been constructed in the Kamakura period by descendants of Fujiwara no Sumitomo. It was the base of Kirishitan daimyō Ōmura Yoshiaki (1568–1615), who assisted Toyotomi Hideyoshi in securing control of Kyūshū. After Hideyoshi's death and the Battle of Sekigahara, the Ōmura clan was confirmed by shōgun Tokugawa Ieyasu as a tozama han with revenues of 27,000 koku in their ancestral territories. The Sengoku period castle of 1598 was rebuilt in 1614 by Ōmura Sumiyori per plans draw up by noted castle designer Katō Kiyomasa. After the start of the national isolation policy and the persecution of the Japanese Christians, many local Christians were herded into the grounds of Ōmura Castle and forced to take poison in 1616. Ōmura Sumiyori himself was poisoned in 1619.

The Ōmura daimyō remained in residence at Kushima Castle until the Meiji Restoration of 1868. It was the seat of the local government until 1871, when the former Ōmura Domain was merged into the new Nagasaki Prefecture. The donjon was pulled down in 1871, as were all of the supporting structures. Today, only the moat and portions of stone walls remain.

In 1884, a Shinto shrine was erected on the foundations of the former keep, in honor of the spirits of the generations of Ōmura daimyō. In 1981, one of the yagura and some earthen walls were reconstructed. The site of the castle now forms Ōmura Park, which contains a number of protected plant species, including many examples of the Ōmura sakura and extensive public gardens.
