= Ken Ogata =

Japanese actor (1937–2008)

- 緒形 拳
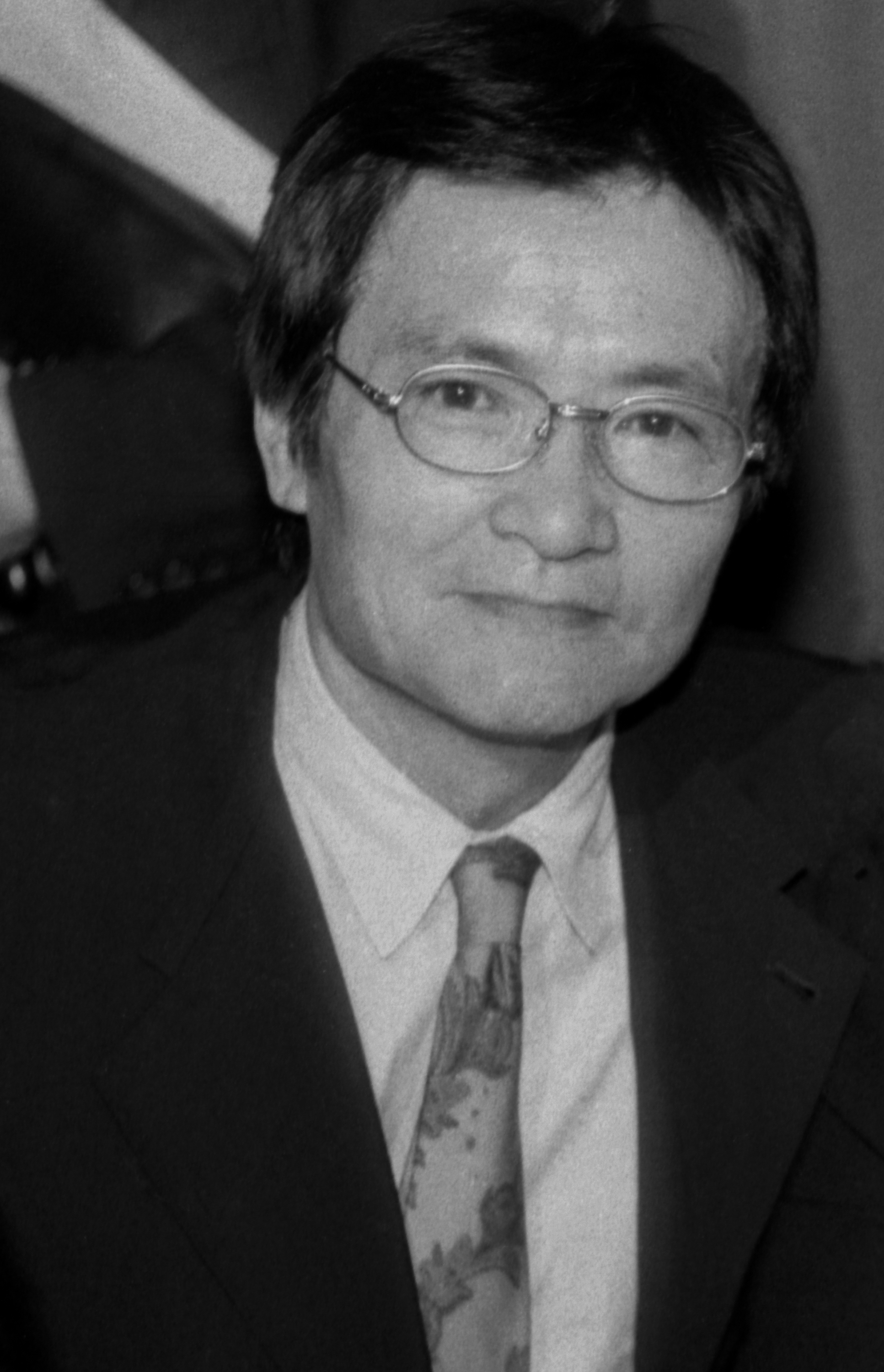
- Born: 緒形 明伸 (Akinobu Ogata); July 20, 1937; Shinjuku, Tokyo, Japan
- Died: October 5, 2008 (aged 71); Mibu, Tochigi, Japan
- Occupation: Actor
- Years active: 1960–2008
- Awards: Japan Academy Prize; Best Actor; 1979 The Demon; 1984 The Ballad of Narayama; 1987 House on Fire

Akinobu Ogata (緒形 明伸, Ogata Akinobu; 20 July 1937 – 5 October 2008), better known by his stage name Ken Ogata (緒形 拳, Ogata Ken), was a Japanese actor. He appeared in more than 50 movies and 25 television series. For his merits and contribution to arts in 2000 received Japan's Medal of Honor with Purple Ribbon.

Among many movie awards and nominations, he received three times Japan Academy Film Prize award for Best Actor for The Demon (1978), The Ballad of Narayama (1983) and House on Fire (1986), and in addition Blue Ribbon Award for Best Actor for The Catch and Okinawan Boys (1983). Other notable roles were in Shohei Imamura's Vengeance Is Mine (1979), Paul Schrader's Mishima: A Life in Four Chapters (1985), Peter Greenaway's The Pillow Book (1996).

== Life ==
Ogata was born on July 20, 1937 in Tokyo, Japan. He started his acting career in 1958 as part of the Shinkokugeki theater troupe.

His movie debut was 1960s Tooi Hitotsu No Michi, but his starring role as Toyotomi Hideyoshi in the 1965 NHK Taiga drama Taikōki catapulted him to fame. Ken went on to many prominent roles in subsequent programs. The following year, he portrayed Benkei in Minamoto no Yoshitsune. The network tapped him again for the role of Fujiwara no Sumitomo in the 1976 Kaze to Kumo to Niji to. He returned to playing Hideyoshi in the 1978 Ōgon no Hibi, and returned to the lead as Ōishi Kuranosuke in Tōge no Gunzō, the 1982 Chūshingura. Another featured appearance in a Taiga drama was in Taiheiki (1991, as Ashikaga Sadauji, father of Takauji). His final appearance in the taiga drama was Fūrin Kazan in 2007. Besides the taiga drama series, Ogata portrayed Fujieda Baian in the Hissatsu series Hissatsu Shikakenin, he reprised the character twice in the film series later.

His last lead role was in A Long Walk (2006). Mr. Ogata died of liver cancer on October 5, 2008, just days after finishing his role in the production of the Fuji TV drama Kaze no Garden (Garden of the Winds).

Ogata was a talented calligrapher and held a public exhibition in 1991. His sons Kanta and Naoto are actors as well.

== Filmography ==
=== Film ===
Year	Title	Role	Notes	Ref(s)
1968	The Sex Check			
1969	Samurai Banners			
1969	Farewell, My Beloved			
1969	Lady with Seven Faces			
1973	Professional Killers: Assassin’s Quarry	Fujieda Baian	Lead role, Hissatsu series	
1974	Hissatsu Shikakenin Shunsetsu shikakebari	Fujieda Baian	Lead role, Hissatsu series	
1974	Castle of Sand	Ken'ichi Miki		
1974	The Last Samurai			
1977	Mount Hakkoda			
1978	The Demon		Lead role	
1979	Vengeance Is Mine		Lead role	
1980	Virus			
1981	Samurai Reincarnation	Miyamoto Musashi		
1981	Eijanaika			
1981	Edo Porn	Tetsuzō	Lead role	
1982	Yaju-deka		Lead role	
1983	The Ballad of Narayama		Lead role	
1983	The Catch		Lead role	
1983	Okinawan Boys			
1983	The Geisha		Lead role	
1985	Mishima: A Life in Four Chapters	Yukio Mishima	Lead role	
1985	Oar		Lead role	
1985	Tracked		Lead role	
1986	House on Fire		Lead role	
1987	Zegen		Lead role	
1988	A Chaos of Flowers			
1988	Oracion			
1989	Shogun's Shadow		Lead role	
1989	Shaso		Lead role	
1989	Zatoichi, Darkness Is His Ally	Rônin/Masterless samurai		
1991	Rainbow Kids	Daigoro Igari		
1991	My Soul Is Slashed		Lead role	
1992	Dreams of Russia	Daikokuya Kōdayū	Lead role	
1996	The Pillow Book			
1999	Shooting Star	Kikujirō Yamamoto	Lead role	
2000	Film Noir	Ichihara		
2001	Man Walking on Snow	Nobuo Honma	Lead role	
2002	11'09"01 September 11		Episode 11: "Japan"	
2004	The Hidden Blade			
2004	Izo			
2004	Last Quarter of the Moon			
2004	The Man Who Wipes Mirrors		Lead role	
2005	The Samurai I Loved	Maki Sukezaemon		
2006	Love and Honor			
2006	A Long Walk		Lead role	
2008	Kitaro and the Millennium Curse	Nurarihyon	Final film role	

=== Television ===
Year	Title	Role	Notes	Ref(s)
1965	Taikōki	Toyotomi Hideyoshi	Lead role, Taiga drama	
1966	Minamoto no Yoshitsune	Benkei	Taiga drama	
1972	Shin Heike Monogatari	Dr. Abe no Asadori	Taiga drama	
1972	Hissatsu Shikakenin	Fujieda Baian	Lead role, Hissatsu series	
1975	Hissatsu Hitchuu Shigotoya Kagyō	Hanbei	Lead role, Hissatsu series	
1975	Tsūkai! Kōchiyama Sōshun	Chōji	Episode 15	
1976	Kaze to Kumo to Niji to	Fujiwara no Sumitomo	Taiga drama	
1976	Hissatsu Karakurinin	Yumeya Tokijirō	Lead role, Hissatsu series	
1976	Zatoichi Season 2	Gonnosuke	Episode 12 "Money And Hell"	
1977–78	Shin Hissatsu Karakurinin	Hiroshige, narrator	Hissatsu series	
1978	Ōgon no Hibi	Toyotomi Hideyoshi	Taiga drama	
1979	Ashura no Gotoku Part 1	Satomi Takao		
1979	Zatoichi Season 4	Hikotarō	Episode 6 "The Spinning Wheel"	
1982	Tōge no Gunzō	Ōishi Kuranosuke	Lead role, Taiga drama	
1985	Hagoku	Seitarō Sakuma	Lead role, television film	
1988	Tokugawa Ieyasu	Toyotomi Hideyoshi	Television film	
1991	Taiheiki	Ashikaga Sadauji	Taiga drama	
1997	Mōri Motonari	Amago Tsunehisa	Taiga drama	
1997	Gift	Yujiro Kishiwada	The final episode	
1998	The Scorching Silk Road		Documentary	
1999	Furuhata Ninzaburō	Kengo Kuroiwa	Episode 27	
1999	Dear Friend	Kiichi Satake	Television film	
2003	Say Hello to Black Jack	Osamu Hattori		
2005	Ruri's Island	Yūzō Nakama		
2006	Sailor Suit and Machine Gun	Hajime Sandaiji	Special appearance	
2007	Fūrin Kazan	Usami Sadamitsu	Taiga drama	
2008	Bōshi	Shunpei Takayama	Lead role	
2008	Garden of Breeze	Teizō Shiratori		

=== Japanese dub ===
- The Golden Compass – Iorek Byrnison (2008)

== Honours ==
- Medal with Purple Ribbon (2000)
- Order of the Rising Sun, 4th Class, Gold Rays with Rosette (2008)
