= Coquille (film) =

- Film poster
- Directed by: Shun Nakahara
- Screenplay by: Kota Yamada
- Based on: Kokiiyū kaigara by Osamu Yamamoto
- Produced by: Naoya Narita; Nozomi Enoki
- Starring: Kaoru Kobayashi; Jun Fubuki; Toru Masuoka; Jitsuko Yoshimura; Yasufumi Hayashi
- Cinematography: Shōgo Ueno
- Edited by: Isao Tomita; Nobuko Tomita
- Music by: Takehiko Yamada
- Production company: Shochiku
- Distributed by: Nippon Herald Films
- Release date: March 27, 1999 (Japan)
- Running time: 95 minutes
- Country: Japan
- Language: Japanese

Coquille (Japanese: コキーユ 貝殻, Hepburn: Kokiiyū kaigara; lit. Coquille Seashell) is a 1999 Japanese romantic drama film directed by Shun Nakahara and written by Kota Yamada, based on a manga of the same name by Osamu Yamamoto. The film's title refers to the French word for "shell". Coquille stars Kaoru Kobayashi and Jun Fubuki as a former couple who meet again at their class reunion. The cast also includes Toru Masuoka, Jitsuko Yoshimura and Yasufumi Hayashi. Takehiko Yamada composed the film's soundtrack. Coquille was shown in competition at the 11th Tokyo International Film Festival, where it was nominated for the Tokyo Grand Prix, before being theatrically released by Nippon Herald Films on March 27, 1999, in Japan.

== Plot ==
The film tells a bittersweet love story between two middle-aged people. Thirty years after graduating from Hiroseyama Junior High School, Tatsuya Urayama attends his class reunion. He is married and works at a factory. At the reunion he meets Naoko, a former classmate whom he once had a crush on. They lost touch after she got married and moved to Tokyo. She has since divorced and returned with her teenage daughter Kaori (who looks exactly like Naoko did when she was a teenager). Naoko now runs a bar called "Coquille", which she named after a line from a Jean Cocteau poem: "My ears are shells, longing for the sound of the sea." The line was inscribed inside a poetry book that young Tatsuya gave her as a graduation present (he also gave her a white shell). Naoko treasured both presents, as she too had a crush on Tatsuya when she was young, though the two were never together. Naoko recognizes Tatsuya instantly, but Tatsuya initially struggles to remember her.

A few days after the reunion, Tatsuya decides to visit Coquille with his friend and boss Satoshi Kuroda, who was recently demoted. As Tatsuya and Naoko share stories, they hit it off and grow closer. Soon Tatsuya is visiting the bar frequently just to talk to Naoko. However, one day, Satoshi, stressed about his demotion and pending transfer to Tokyo, attempts suicide. He survives but is hospitalized. Tatsuya visits him, and Satoshi, delirious, speaks of his first love, a woman who had participated in the Anpo protests with him. He speaks of how he is still in love with her. Satoshi's wife is shocked to hear her husband say this. After Satoshi gets out of the hospital, Tatsuya watches as his friend's family falls apart.

Tatsuya bumps into an old classmate, Jiro Tanikawa. He learns that Jiro once had a physical relationship with Naoko. He begins to avoid the Coquille bar and plans to move to Tokyo with his wife. Unaware of this, Naoko makes pomegranate wine and waits for Tatsuya. After several days, she visits the factory where Tatsuya works. There Naoko confesses that, on the day before their junior high graduation ceremony, she had whispered to Tatsuya to come to Kurakakebashi Bridge. She planned to tell him how she felt about him, but Tatsuya never arrived. However, Tatsuya says he lost the use of his right ear due to a childhood illness. As Naoko had whispered in his right ear, he was unable to understand what she said. Naoko confesses that she has thought about Tatsuya ever since that day, even after she got married. Realizing that he, too, is still attracted to Naoko, Tatsuya takes off work, pretending to be on a business trip, and goes hiking with her. While hiking, the two reminisce about the past. They recall hiking the same mountain as teenagers, as well as memories of a school marathon.

The two become lost and miss the last bus back to town. They decide to stay at an inn. After dinner, they go to bed together and have sex. When the two wake the next morning, they bathe in an onsen together. Naoko's dreams have finally come true, but Tatsuya feels immense guilt for cheating. On the way back to town, Tatsuya promises to confess to his wife about everything that has happened. Naoko stops him. She says that she does not want to ruin his happiness, and though she has found true love with him, she will cut off the relationship.

Tatsuya moves to Tokyo with his wife. Later, in winter, after he has settled into his new home, Tatsuya learns from Jiro that Naoko was killed by a truck that skidded on ice. Tatsuya returns to his hometown and visits Naoko's grave, where he finds Kaori. Kaori says that, as she drew her last breath, Naoko uttered "Urayama-kun", her nickname for Tatsuya.

At the next class reunion, a moment of silence is held for Naoko. A person is heard sobbing from the corner of the room. It is Tatsuya, quietly crying to himself.

== Cast ==
- Kaoru Kobayashi as Tatsuya Urayama
- Jun Fubuki as Naoko Hayase
  - Maya Hamaoka as Young Naoko/Kaori Hayase
- Toru Masuoka as Jiro Tanikawa
- Jitsuko Yoshimura as Kimie Fujisaki
- Yasufumi Hayashi as Kazuo Nakamura
- Ryō Iwamatsu as Naoyuki Goda
- Kumija Kim as Etsuko Urayama (credited as Kumiko Kim)
- Kōichi Nihei as Igarashi Sensei
- Sanshō Shinsui as Satoshi Kuroda
- Yukiko Tachibana as Michiyo Sonoda
- Haruna Takase as Kuroda's wife
- Ryōko Tateishi as Classmate
- Shinshō Nakamaru as Masaki Yonenaga

== Music ==
The film's soundtrack was composed and arranged by Takehiko Yamada. It features a small chamber-style ensemble centered around Yamada's piano solos. The soundtrack was released to CD on January 21, 1999 by Epic/Sony, ahead of the film's premiere.

All music is composed by Takehiko Yamada:

No.	Title	Length
1.	"La Coquille (album version) (アルバム・ヴァージョン)"
2.	"Lost Time ~ Distant People (失われた時間～遠い人)"
3.	"Shell (貝殻)"
4.	"Coquilles et Conquillages"
5.	"Night (夜)"
6.	"Walking"
7.	"Crystal Tune"
8.	"Flower Market ~ Lost Time (Flower Market～失われた時間)"
9.	"About That Day... (あの日のこと...)"
10.	"Children's Landscape (子供の風景)"
11.	"Shadow of the Mountain (山の影)"
12.	"Memories of the Tide (潮の追憶)"
13.	"Two People with the Autumn Sky (秋空と二人)"
14.	"Whisky Glass"
15.	"Morning Riverbank (朝の河原)"
16.	"The Water Surface of the Heart (心の水面)"
17.	"Distant Person (遠い人)"
18.	"Alumni Association (同窓会)"
Total length:		40:34

== Release ==
Coquille was shown in competition at the 11th Tokyo International Film Festival, where it was nominated for the Tokyo Grand Prix. It was then theatrically released by Nippon Herald Films on March 27, 1999, in Japan. Shochiku later released the film to DVD on March 28, 2012.

== Awards and nominations ==
24th Hochi Film Awards

- Won: Best Actress (Jun Fubuki, also won for Jubaku: Spellbound)

11th Tokyo International Film Festival

- Nominated: Tokyo Grand Prix (Shun Nakahara)

9th Japanese Movie Critics Awards

- Won: Best Picture

23rd Japan Academy Awards

- Nominated: Outstanding Performance by an Actor in a Leading Role (Kaoru Kobayashi, also nominated for Himitsu)
