= Jun Fubuki =

Japanese actress (born 1952)

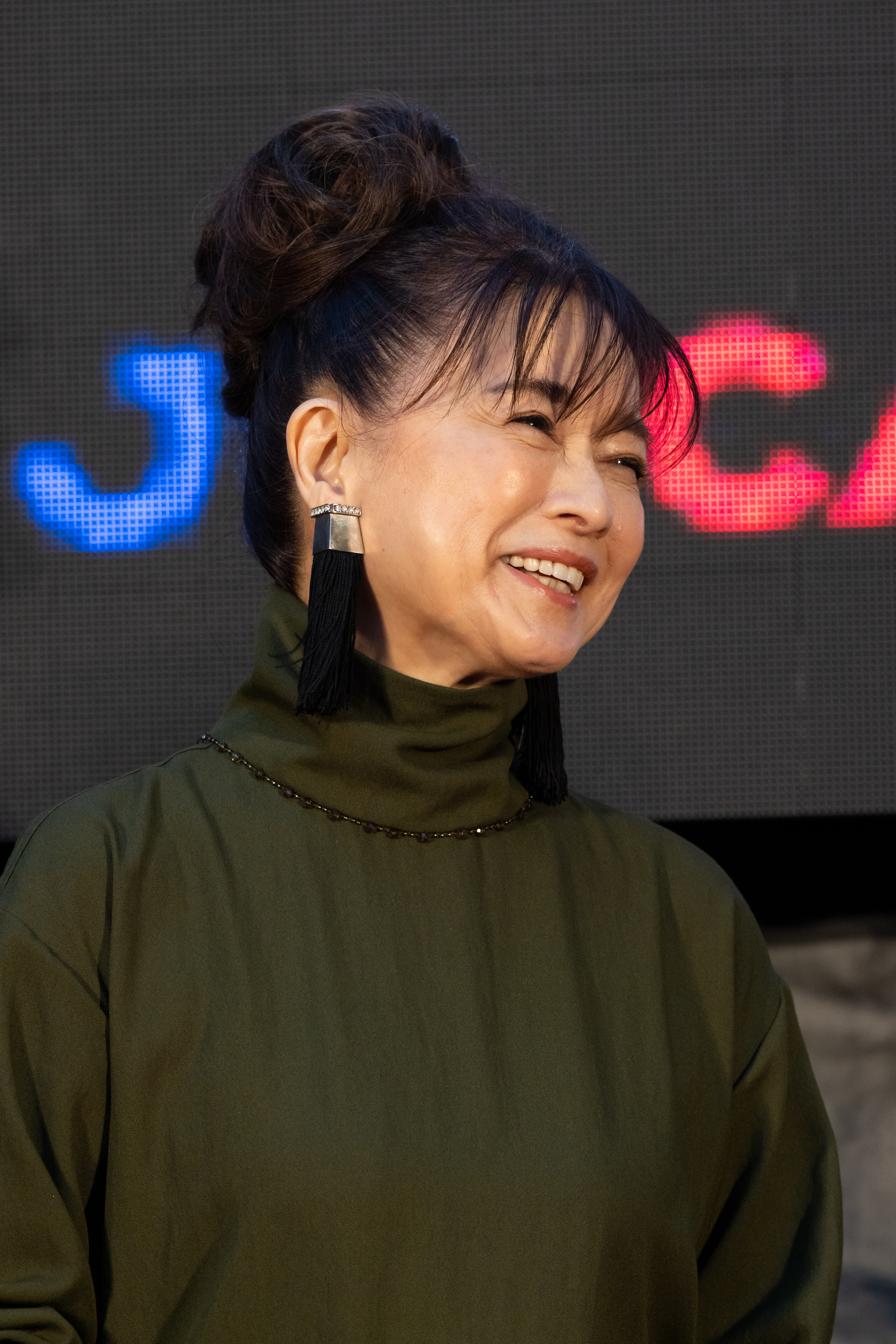
- 2024
- Born: May 12, 1952 (age 74); Toyama City, Toyama prefecture, Japan
- Occupation: Actress
- Years active: 1973–present
- Spouse: Shōrō Kawazoe (m. 1981; div. 1992)
- Children: 2

Jun Fubuki (風吹 ジュン, Fubuki Jun; born May 12, 1952 in Toyama prefecture, Japan) is a Japanese actress.

== Career ==
Jun Fubuki received a Japanese Academy Award Best Supporting Actress nomination for her role in Muno no Hito, and won at the Hochi Film Awards. This role also won Fubuki the "Best Actress" award at the Yokohama Film Festival. She also won the award for best actress at the 24th Hochi Film Award for Coquille and Spellbound.

She has appeared in Kiyoshi Kurosawa's films such as Seance, Charisma, and Pulse.

== Filmography ==
=== Film ===
- Hi no Tori (1978)
- The Resurrection of the Golden Wolf (1979)
- Kemono Tachi no Atsui Nemuri (1981)
- Space Adventure Cobra (1982)
- The Tale of Genji (1987)
- Muno no Hito (1991)
- The Games Teachers Play (1992)
- Tora-San Makes Excuses (1992)
- Samurai Kids (1993)
- It's a Summer Vacation Everyday (1994)
- Goodbye for Tomorrow (1995)
- Koi to Hanabi to Kanransha (1997)
- Tsuribaka Nisshi 9 (1997)
- The Stupid Teacher (1998)
- Coquille (1999)
- Charisma (1999)
- Jubaku: Spellbound (1999)
- Seance (2000) (television film)
- Pickpocket (2000)
- Pulse (2001)
- Through the Night (2002)
- Tegami (2003)
- Pretty Woman (2003)
- Guzen nimo Saiaku na Shonen (2003)
- Kamachi (2004)
- Riyuu (2004)
- Tatchi (2005)
- Tobi ga Kururi to (2005)
- Veronika Decides to Die (2005)
- Island of Light (2006)
- Tales from Earthsea (2006)
- The Summer of Stickleback (2006)
- Awakening (2007)
- From Up on Poppy Hill (2011)
- Rebirth (2011)
- Bunny Drop (2011)
- Tokyo Family (2013), Kayo
- Like Father, Like Son (2013)
- Our Little Sister (2015)
- What a Wonderful Family! (2016), Kayo
- Mukoku (2017)
- What a Wonderful Family! 2 (2017), Kayo
- What a Wonderful Family! 3: My Wife, My Life (2018), Kayo
- Restaurant from the Sky (2018)
- At the End of the Matinee (2019), Nobuko Komine
- Your Eyes Tell (2020)
- The Asadas (2020)
- Arc (2021)
- Sensei, Would You Sit Beside Me? (2021)
- Let Me Hear It Barefoot (2022)
- Fullmetal Alchemist: The Revenge of Scar (2022), Pinako Rockbell
- Fullmetal Alchemist: The Final Alchemy (2022), Pinako Rockbell
- Call Me Chihiro (2023), Tae
- Yoko (2023), Shizue
- The Boy and the Heron (2023), Utako (voice)
- Rude to Love (2024), Teruko
- Aimitagai (2024)
- Spirit World (2024)
- My Beloved Stranger (2025), Kazue Maezono
- Dollhouse (2025), Toshiko Suzuki
- The Silent Service: Battle of the Arctic Ocean (2025), Machiko Kaito
- Shadow Work (2026), Akie
- Guilt (2026), Yoko Asaba
- Beasts Clutching at Straws (2026)

=== Television ===
- Tokyo Megure Keishi (1978)
- Tantei Monogatari (1980)
- Ashura no Gotoku (1979,1980)
- Sailor Suit and Machine Gun (1982)
- Under the Same Roof (1993)
- Kono Ai ni Ikite (1994)
- Saikou no Kataomoi (1995)
- Pure (1996)
- Hitotsu Yane no Shita 2 (1997)
- Riso no Joshi (1997)
- Ao no Jidai (1998)
- Shin Oretachi no Tabi (1999)
- Honmamon (2001)
- Satorare (2002)
- Shoro Nagashi (2002)
- Toshishita no Otoko (2003)
- Tokio (2004)
- Orange Days (2004)
- Minna Mukashi wa Kodomo Datta (2005)
- Walkers (2006)
- Rondo (2006)
- Furin Kazan (2007) – Lady Ōi
- Yae's Sakura (2013) – Yamamoto Saku
- Asa ga Kita (2015) – Yono Shirooka
- Half Blue Sky (2018)
- Mikazuki (2019)
- A Day-Off of Kasumi Arimura (2020) – Kasumi's mother
- Japan Sinks: People of Hope (2021) – Yoshie Amami
- 1122: For a Happy Marriage (2024) – Ichiko's mother
- In Lilac Bloom, The Path to a Veterinarian (2025) – Chidori Ushiku

== Honours ==
- Kinuyo Tanaka Award (2020)
