= Ōmura Suminobu =

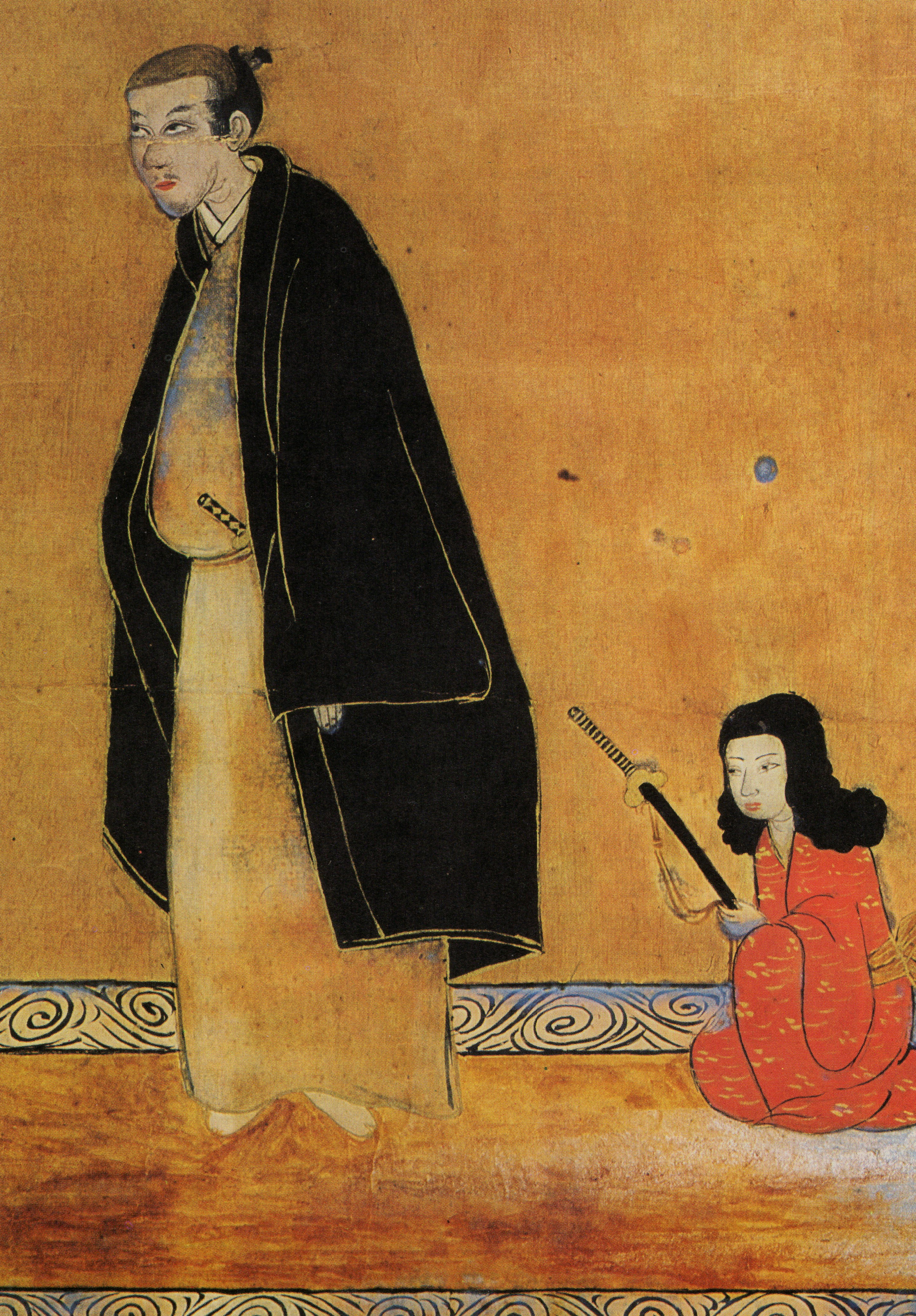
Ōmura Suminobu

Ōmura Suminobu (大村 純信; 1618–1650) (baptized as Dom Lino) was a daimyō of the early Edo period. He was the third lord of Ōmura Domain in Hizen Province. His court rank was Junior Fifth Rank, Lower Grade, and he held the title of Tango no Kami.
