= Okinawan Boys =

- Theatrical release poster

Japanese name
- Kanji: オキナワの少年
- Directed by: Taku Shinjō
- Written by: Shinichiro Nakata; Taku Shinjō; Kazuo Takagiwa
- Based on: Okinawa no shōnen by Mineo Higashi
- Starring: Ken Ogata; Mitsuko Baisho; Keiju Kobayashi
- Cinematography: Shinsaku Himeda
- Edited by: Jun Nabeshima
- Music by: Shin'ichirō Ikebe
- Release date: September 10, 1983 (Japan)
- Running time: 117 minutes
- Country: Japan
- Language: Japanese

Okinawan Boys (Japanese: オキナワの少年) is a 1983 Japanese film directed by Taku Shinjō, based on a novel by Mineo Higashi.

== Cast ==
- Ippo Fujikawa as Higa
- Takashi Naito as Ishigaki
- Miyuki Ono as Mariko
- Ken Ogata as Mr. Higa
- Imari Tsuji as Moshi Higa
- Keiju Kobayashi as
- Nana Okada as Kinuko
- Yumiko Nogawa as Satoko Higa
- Mitsuko Baisho as Ohya
- Jirō Sakagami as Production chief

== Awards and nominations ==
26th Blue Ribbon Awards

- Won: Best Actor - Ken Ogata
