= Ashura no Gotoku (TV series) =

- Genre: Drama
- Written by: Kuniko Mukōda
- Directed by: Ben Wada
- Starring: Kaoru Yachigusa; Haruko Kato; Ken Ogata; Shigeru Tsuyuguchi; Ayumi Ishida; Jun Fubuki; Shin Saburi
- Country of origin: Japan
- Original language: Japanese
- No. of episodes: 7

Production
- Running time: 70 minutes per episode
- Production company: NHK

Original release
- Network: NHK
- Release: January 13, 1979 – February 9, 1980

Related
- Like Asura; Asura

Ashura no Gotoku (阿修羅のごとく) is a Japanese drama series that first aired on NHK in 1979. It is based on Kuniko Mukōda's novel of the same title.

Ken Ogata played the role of Satomi Takao in Part 1 and Shigeru Tsuyuguchi played the role in part 2.

== Cast ==
- Kaoru Yachigusa as Satomi Makiko
- Haruko Kato as Mitamura Tsunako
- Ken Ogata(Part1) / Shigeru Tsuyuguchi(Part2) as Satomi Takao
- Ayumi Ishida as Takezawa Takoko
- Jun Fubuki as Takezawa Sakiko
- Ryudo Uzaki as Katsumata Shizuo
- Shin Saburi as Kotaro Takezawa
- Sanshō Shinsui as Jinnai Hidemitsu
- Ittoku Kishibe(Part2) as Takuma

== Episodes ==
=== Part1 ===
- 1, Onna Shougatsu (January 13, 1979)
- 2, Sando Mame (January 20, 1979)
- 3, Soubijinsou (January 27, 1979)

=== Part2 ===
- 1, Hana Ikusa (January 19, 1980)
- 2, Ura Kimon (January 26, 1980)
- 3, Jyaran (February 2, 1980)
- 4, Otafuku (February 9, 1980)

== Remakes ==
Ashura no Gotoku was adapted as the 2003 Toho film Like Asura.

In 2025, Hirokazu Kore-eda remade the series for Netflix, titled Asura.
