= Ben Wada =

Ben Wada (和田 勉 Wada Ben), born Tsutomu Wada, (June 3, 1930 – January 14, 2011) was a producer for the Japanese TV channel NHK. He was the husband of the costume designer Emi Wada.

== Biography ==
Ben Wada was born in Matsusaka, Mie Prefecture. After attending Sugamo Middle School and Senior High School, Wada graduated from the Drama department of the Literature Faculty at Waseda University. He joined NHK in 1953 and worked as a freelance director. His contemporaries include Hisanori Isomura and Naoya Yoshida. Working primarily as a director/producer, Wada was in charge of projects such as Ashura no gotoku, Za Shōsha and numerous TV dramas. He retired in 1987 and continued to make advances in his field even after retirement. Harimao was Wada's debut as a film director.

Wada published a collection of memoirs and writings entitled TV Autobiography—Farewell My Love in 2003.

Wada died from esophageal cancer on January 14, 2011. Wada's widow, Emi Wada, was a fashion designer.

== Partial filmography ==
- The Perfect Education (1999)
- Harimao (1989)
