= Ayumi Ishida (actress) =

Japanese actress and singer (1948–2025)

Ayumi Ishida いしだ あゆみ
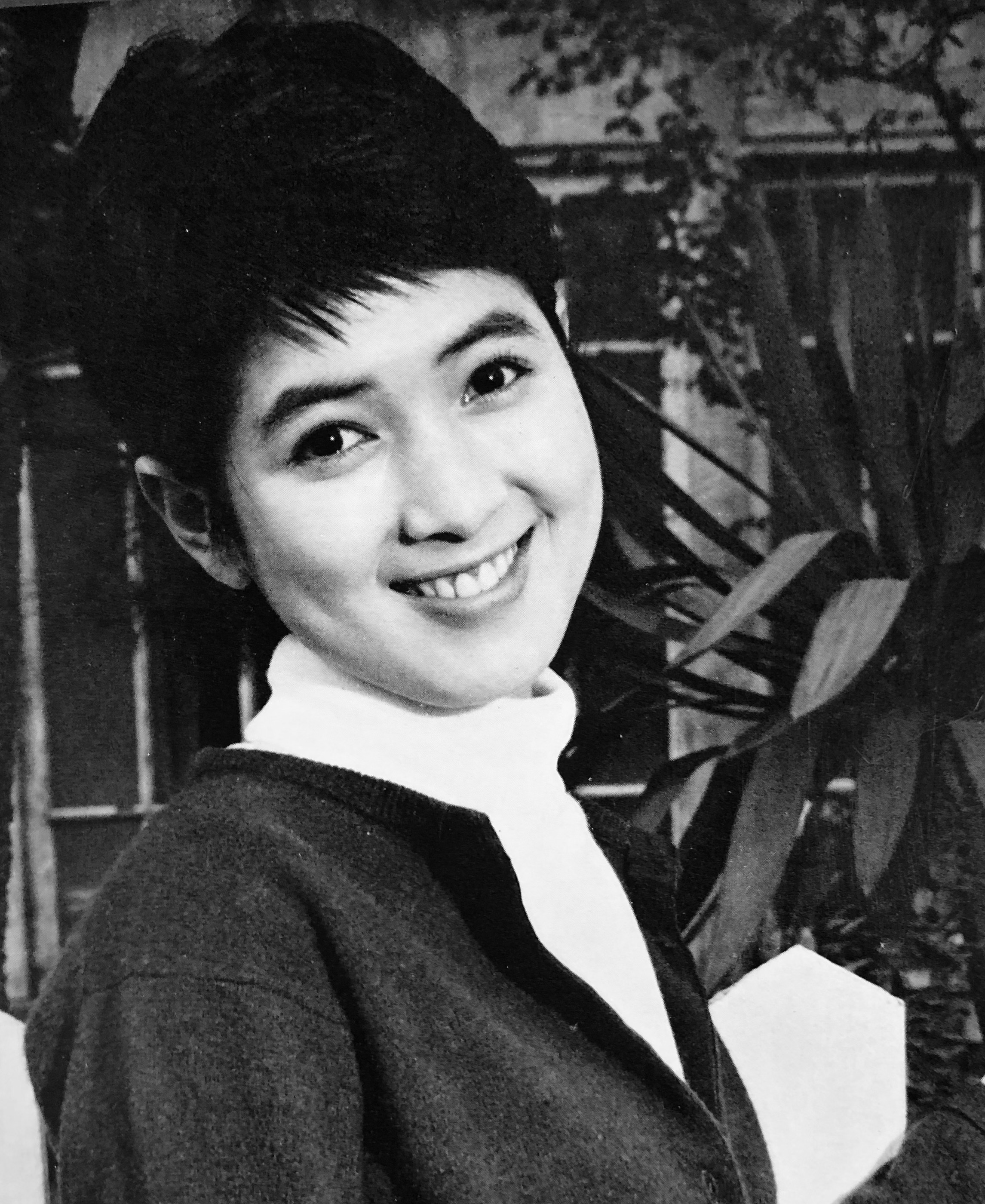
- Ishida, 1965

Background information
- Birth name: Yoshiko Ishida (石田 良子)
- Born: March 26, 1948; Sasebo, Nagasaki, Japan
- Origin: Ikeda, Osaka, Japan
- Died: March 11, 2025 (aged 76); Tokyo, Japan
- Genres: Enka, kayōkyoku
- Occupation(s): Idol, singer, actress
- Labels: Victor Entertainment (1964–1968); Nippon Columbia (1968–1980); Alfa Records (1981–1984); Sony Music Records (1985); Taurus Records (1986)
- Website: izawaoffice.jp/artist/ishida.php

Ayumi Ishida (いしだ あゆみ, Ishida Ayumi, March 26, 1948 – March 11, 2025) was a Japanese actress and singer, whose real name was Yoshiko Ishida (石田 良子, Ishida Yoshiko). She was the second among four daughters. She won the award for Best Actress at the 4th Yokohama Film Festival for Yajūdeka. She also won the awards for best actress at the 29th Blue Ribbon Awards and the 11th Hochi Film Award for House on Fire and Tokei - Adieu l'hiver.

As for her musical career, she was best known for the singles "BLUE LIGHT Yokohama" (which topped the charts in 1968/1969 at #1), "Anata nara Dō Suru (#2), and "Sabaku no You na Tokyo de" (#3).

On March 17, 2025, her agency announced that she had died from hypothyroidism on March 11. She was 76.

== Filmography ==
=== Film ===
- 1973 – Submersion of Japan
- 1977 – Seishun no mon: Jiritsu hen
- 1979 – Hunter in the Dark
- 1981 – Station
- 1982 – Hearts and Flowers for Tora-san
- 1982 – Yajū-deka
- 1986 – Tokei - Adieu l'hiver
- 1986 – House on Fire
- 1988 – Umi e, See You
- 1996 – Gakko II
- 1998 – Puraido: Unmei no Toki
- 2011 – Eclair
- 2024 – Shinji Muroi: Not Defeated
- 2024 – Shinji Muroi: Stay Alive

=== Television drama ===
- Ashura no Gotoku (1979–1980)
- Oda Nobunaga: Tenka wo Totta Baka (1998), Dota Gozen
- Saiyūki (2006)
- Smile (2009)

== Discography ==
=== Singles ===
- "Taiyō wa Naiteru" (1968) (#18 Oricon charts)
- "Futari dake no Shiro" (1968)
- "BLUE LIGHT Yokohama" (1968) (#1)
- "Namida no Naka o Aruiteru" (1969) (#10)
- "Kyō kara Anata o" (1969) (#7)
- "Kenka no Aoto de Kuchizuke o" (1969) (#7)
- "Anata nara Dō Suru" (1970) (#2)
- "Kinō no Onna" (1970) (#8)
- "Nani ga Anata o Sōsaseta" (1970) (#12)
- "Tomenaide" (1971) (#20)
- "Sabaku no Yō na Tokyo de" (1971) (#3)
- "Omoide no Nagasaki" (1971) (#10)
- "Sasurai no Tenshi" (1972) (#18)
- "Marude Tobenai Kotori no Yō ni" (1972) (#45)
- "Umare Kawareru Mono Naraba" (1972) (#43)
- "Ai Shū" (1973) (#51)
- "Nagisa Nite" (1973) (#52)
- "Ai no Hyōga" (1973) (#42)
- "Shiawase Datta wa Arigato" (1974) (#42)
- "Koi wa Hatsukoi" (1974) (#54)
- "Utsukushii Wakare" (1974) (#74)
- "Ieji" (1974)
- "Machiwabite mo" (1975)
- "Toki ni wa Hitori de" (1975) (#83)
- "Tomadoi" (1976)
- "Chotto Sabishii Haru Desu ne" (1977)
- "Kō Sakamichi Ijinkan" (1977)
- "Konya wa Hoshizora" (1978)
- "Osaka no Onna" (1978)
- "MILD NIGHT" (1979) (#86)
- "MILD WOMAN ROCK" (1980)
- "Akai Giyaman" (1981)
- "Hagoromo Tennyo" (1985) (#78)
- "Wakare Michi" (1986)

=== Albums ===
- Blue Light Yokohama (1969)
- Lonely Night With Ayumi Ishida (1970)
- My First Recital (1970)
- Fantasy (1972)
- Ayumi Ishida Sings Her Best Hits (1972)
- Our Connection (with Tin Pan Alley, 1977)
- Ayumi Ishida (1981)

== Kōhaku Uta Gassen Appearances ==
Year	#	Song	No.	VS	Remarks
1969 (Showa 44)/20th	1	Blue Light Yokohama (ブルー・ライト・ヨコハマ)	2/23	Masao Sen	
1970 (Showa 45)/21st	2	Anata Naradousuru (あなたならどうする)	19/24	Kazuo Funaki	
1971 (Showa 46)/22nd	3	Sabaku No Youna Tokyou (砂漠のような東京で)	16/25	Hideo Murata	
1972 (Showa 47)/23rd	4	Umarekawarumononaraba (生まれかわるものならば)	9/23	Aoi Sankaku Jyougi	
1973 (Showa 48)/24th	5	Blue Light Yokohama (2)	2/22	Teruhiko Saigō	
1974 (Showa 49)/25th	6	Utsukushiki Wakare (美しい別れ)	21/25	Hachiro Kasuga	
1975 (Showa 50)/26th	7	Nagisanite (渚にて)	21/24	Hachiro Kasuga (2)	
1976 (Showa 51)/27th	8	Tokiniwa Hitoride (時には一人で)	12/24	Yukio Hashi	
1977 (Showa 52)/28th	9	Minato Sakamichi Ijinyakata (港・坂道・異人館)	16/24	Frank Nagai	
1993 (Heisei 5)/44th	10	Blue Light Yokohama (3)	8/26	Tetsuya Watari	First Half Finale, returned after 16 years.

== In other media ==
Ayumi Ishida is mentioned in the 2017 crime/mystery novel Blue Light Yokohama by Nicolás Obregón to be printed in the United Kingdom by Michael Joseph and Minotaur in the USA.

Ayumi Ishida is mentioned in Haruki Murakami's Norwegian Wood.

== Honours ==
- Order of the Rising Sun, 4th Class, Gold Rays with Rosette (2021)
