= Ōmura clan =

Japanese clan

Ōmura 大村氏
- The emblem (mon) of the Ōmura clan
- Home province: Fujiwara Clan
- Titles: Kampaku; Daijō-daijin
- Founder: Ōmura Yoshiaki
- Final ruler: Ōmura Sumihiro
- Founding year: c. 1600
- Dissolution: c. 1871

The Ōmura clan (大村氏, Ōmura-shi) was a clan of samurai of Medieval Japan of the province of Hizen descended from Fujiwara no Sumitomo (died 941). The clan is notable for being the first daimyo family in Japan to convert to Christianity in 1562.

== Notable clan members ==
- Ōmura Tadazumi (大村 忠澄) An eighth-generation descendant of Sumimoto, he was the first to take the surname Ōmura, named after a village in Hizen Province where he lived.
- Ōmura Sumitada (大村純忠; 1532–1587) son of Arima Haruzumi, was chosen to succeed Ōmura Sumiaki. Baptized in 1562 with the name Bartholomew he was the first daimyō to remain faithful to the religion until his death. It was he who in 1568 opened the port of Fukae to foreign trade, which later became the city of Nagasaki.
- Ōmura Yoshiaki (大村 喜前; 1568–1615) son of Sumitada, he was also a Christian and received the name Sanche. In 1600, he remained neutral during the Sekigahara Campaign and had to pass his own domain to his son. He spent the rest of his life in debauchery.
- Ōmura Sumiyori (大村 純頼; 1592–1619) son of Yoshiaki. He was baptized and received the name Bartholomew , like his grandfather. However towards the end of his life he persecuted the Christians of his fiefdom.
- Ōmura Sumihiro (大村 純熈; 1831–1882) received the title of count after the abolition of the han system.

== See also ==
- Ōmura Domain

== Externial connections ==
- "Mr. Omura su Harimaya.com" (in Japanese).
- "Omura clan". Archived from the original on August 11, 2016.
