= Mineo Higashi =

Japanese writer

- Born: 1938 (age 87–88)
- Awards: Akutagawa Prize (1971)

Mineo Higashi (born 1938) is a Japanese writer. He was awarded the Akutagawa Prize in 1971 for his novel An Okinawan Boy (Okinawa no shonen, 1971). The novel's setting is the city of Koza (later Okinawa City) in the 1950s, where the main character grows up in a family whose business is to arrange meetings between American soldiers and Okinawan girls in the family's apartment. The novel was adapted into the 1983 film Okinawan Boys by director Taku Shinjō.
