= Yaju-deka =

1982 film

- DVD cover
- Directed by: Eiichi Kudo
- Written by: Fumio Kōnami
- Produced by: Goro Kusakabe
- Starring: Ken Ogata; Ayumi Ishida; Shigeru Izumiya; Gannosuke Ashiya; Kai Atō
- Cinematography: Seizō Sengen
- Edited by: Isamu Ichida
- Music by: Katsuo Ohno
- Distributed by: Toei Company
- Release date: 2 October 1982 (Japan)
- Running time: 122 minutes
- Country: Japan
- Language: Japanese

Yaju-deka (Japanese: 野獣刑事, Hepburn: Yajū deka), known in English as The Dropout, is a 1982 Japanese drama film directed by Eiichi Kudo. It was entered into the 33rd Berlin International Film Festival, and theatrically released in Japan on October 2, 1982 by Toei Company.

== Cast ==
- Ken Ogata as Seiji Ōtaki
- Ayumi Ishida as Keiko Yamane
- Shigeru Izumiya as Toshiaki Sakagami
- Gannosuke Ashiya as Seiji Shimamura
- Kai Atō as Kita
- Tatsuo Endō as Kitou
- Moeko Ezawa as Noriko's mother
- Makoto Fujita as Kawabata
- Masataka Iwao as Shoji
- Keizō Kanie as Yakuza
- Kaoru Kobayashi as Miura
- Akaji Maro as Painter
- Tōru Masuoka as Teruichi Tanaka
- Mikio Narita as Kuroki
- Tadashi Naruse as Sunakawa
