= Jubaku: Spellbound =

- DVD cover

Japanese name
- Kanji: 金融腐蝕列島 呪縛
- Directed by: Masato Harada
- Written by: Ryo Takasugi; Satoshi Suzuki; Mugita Kinoshita
- Produced by: Masato Hara
- Starring: Kōji Yakusho; Kippei Shiina; Jun Fubuki; Mayumi Wakamura; Kenichi Yajima; Ikuji Nakamura; Kenichi Endō; Hitomi Kuroki; Yumi Takigawa; Jinpachi Nezu; Kei Satō; Tatsuya Nakadai
- Cinematography: Yoshitaka Sakamoto
- Edited by: Akimasa Kawashima
- Music by: Masahiro Kawasaki
- Production company: Toei Tokyo
- Distributed by: Toei Inc.
- Release date: September 18, 1999 (Japan)
- Running time: 116 minutes
- Country: Japan
- Language: Japanese

Jubaku: Spellbound (Japanese: 金融腐蝕列島 呪縛) is a 1999 Japanese film directed by Masato Harada.

== Cast ==
- Kōji Yakusho as Hiroshi Kitano
- Tatsuya Nakadai as Hideaki Sasaki
- Kippei Shiina as Akio Katayama
- Jun Fubuki as Kyoko Kitano
- Jinpachi Nezu as Kohei Nakayama
- Mayumi Wakamura as Miho Wada
- Kei Satō as Takashi Hisayama
- Kenichi Endō as Ōnogi
- Hitomi Kuroki as Hiroko Sato
- Tetsurō Tamba (special appearance) as Tajiro Kawakami
- Renji Ishibashi
- Taketoshi Naitō
- Nobuyuki Katsube
- Haruma Miura
- Joe Odagiri
- Yumi Takigawa
- Kenichi Yajima
- Ikuji Nakamura

== Awards and nominations ==
24th Hochi Film Award

- Won: Best Film
- Won: Best Actress - Jun Fubuki (also won for Coquille)
- Won: Best Supporting Actor - Kippei Shiina

23rd Japan Academy Prize

- Won: Best Film Editing
- Nominated: Best Film
- Nominated: Best Director
- Nominated: Best Actor - Kōji Yakusho
- Nominated: Best Supporting Actor - Kippei Shiina
- Nominated: Best Supporting Actress - Mayumi Wakamura
- Nominated: Best Screenplay
- Nominated: Best Cinematography
- Nominated: Best Lighting
- Nominated: Best Music Score
- Nominated: Best Art Direction
- Nominated: Best Sound

54th Mainichi Film Awards

- Won: Best Cinematography
- Won: Best Editing

12th Nikkan Sports Film Award

- Won: Best Supporting Actor - Kippei Shiina
