= Nagasaki bugyō =

Officials of the Tokugawa shogunate

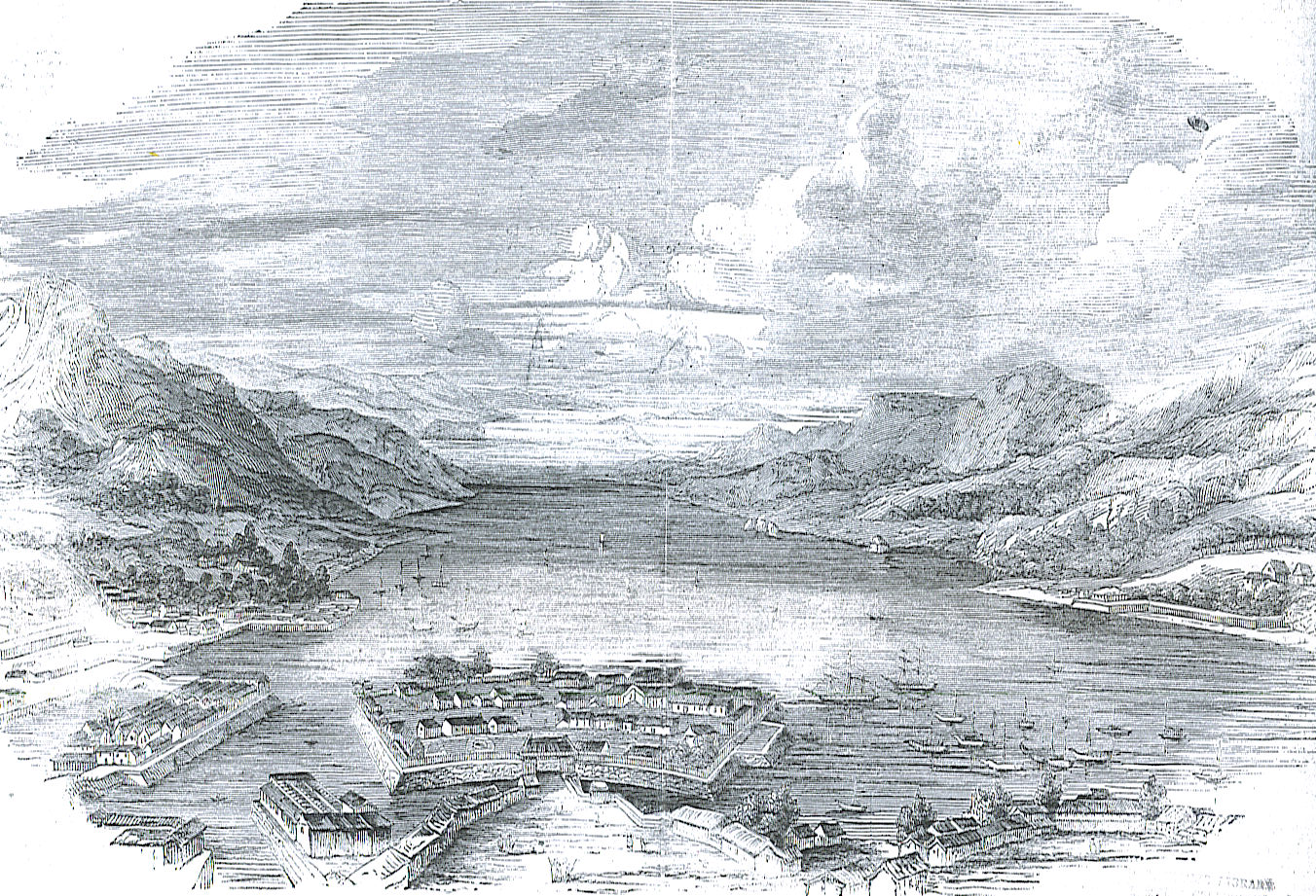
A bird's-eye view of Nagasaki harbor as published in the Illustrated London News (March 23, 1853). In the center – the fan-shape of the Dutch traders' Dejima island compound and the Chinese compound is shown just to the left, separated from each other by narrow stretch of water. Bakufu supervision of these foreigners was under the control of the Nagasaki bugyō.

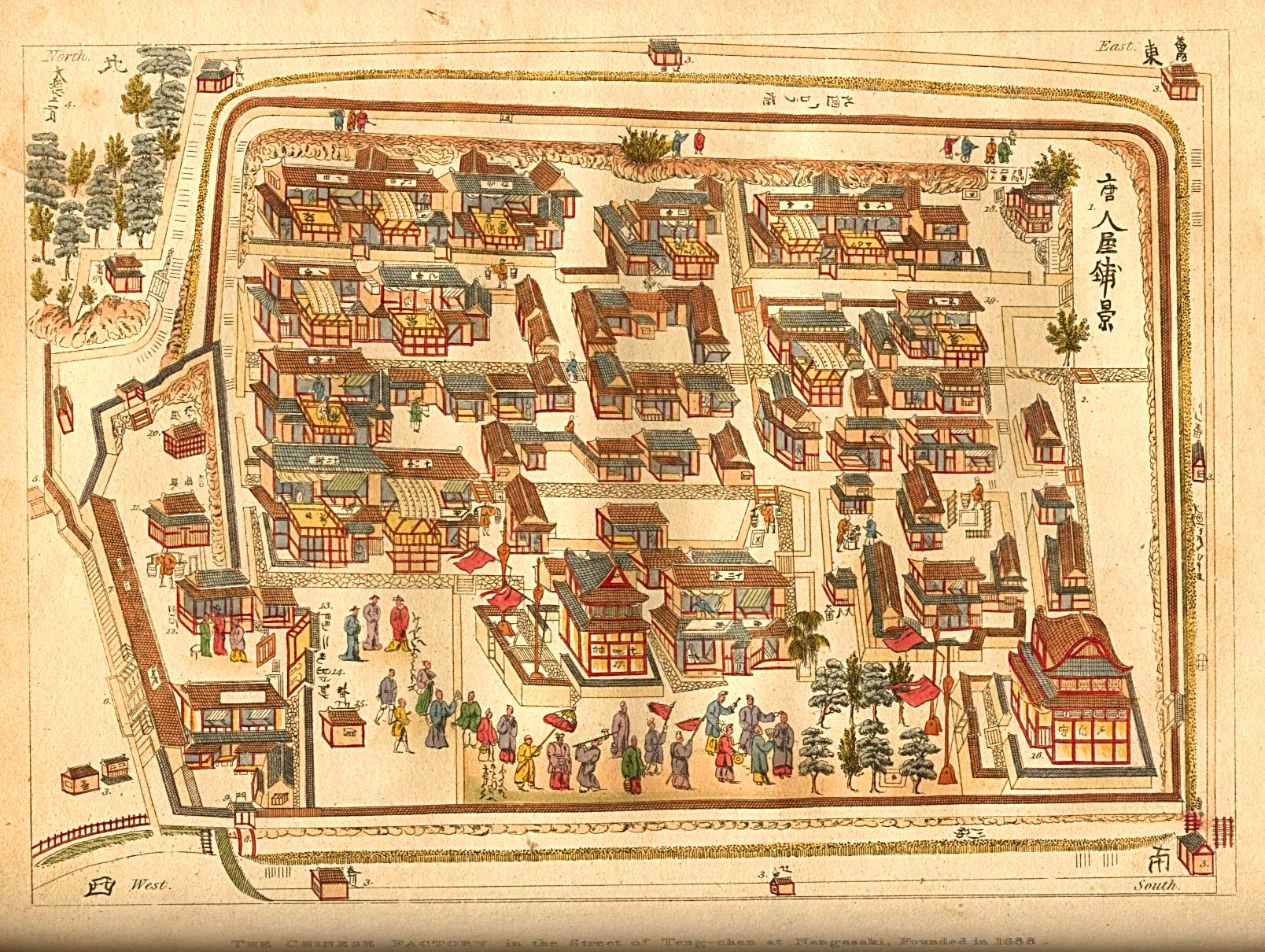
The Chinese traders at Nagasaki were confined to a walled compound (Tōjin yashiki) which was located in the same vicinity as Dejima island; and the activities of the Chinese, though less strictly controlled than the Dutch, were closely monitored by the Nagasaki bugyō.

Nagasaki bugyō (長崎奉行) were officials of the Tokugawa shogunate in Edo period Japan. Appointments to this prominent office were usually fudai daimyōs, but this was amongst the senior administrative posts open to those who were not daimyōs. Conventional interpretations have construed these Japanese titles as "commissioner", "overseer" or "governor".

== Responsibilities ==
This bakufu title identifies an official responsible for administration of the port of Nagasaki, including the Chinese and Dutch settlements located there. This bugyō was also responsible for overseeing the port's commercial activities. The numbers of men holding the title concurrently would vary during the years of this period. At any given time, one would normally be in residence at Nagasaki, and the other would be in Edo as part of an alternating pattern.

Other duties of the Nagasaki bugyō included monitoring news and scientific developments in the West as information became available in the course of trade. For example, the Nagasaki City Museum preserves letters from the Dutch opperhoofd to the Nagasaki bugyō about the two-year-long sales negotiations and the purchase price of a portable Dutch astronomical quadrant imported into Japan in 1792, implying that the instrument was seen as important by both the Japanese and the Dutch. The details of the instrument, along with some elaborate drawings, were provided in the Kansei Rekisho (Compendium of the Kansei Calendar), which was completed around 1844. The compendium records the names of the instrument’s manufacturers, as inscribed on the telescope and on the pendulum box—G. Hulst van Keulen and J. Marten Kleman (1758–1845). Although that instrument once owned by the Astronomical Office of the shogunal government is now lost, drawings of a quadrant equipped with a telescope (Gensho Kansei-kyo zu) have been reported by the National Astronomical Observatory of Japan.

== Shogunal city ==
During this period, Nagasaki was designated a "shogunal city". The number of such cities rose from three to eleven under Tokugawa administration.

== List of Nagasaki bugyō ==
- Ogasawara Tamemune (1603–1604)
- Hasegawa Shigeyoshi (1604–1605)
- Hasegawa Fujihiro (1605–1614)
- Hasegawa Fujimasa (1605–1614)
- Takenaka Umene (1626–1631)
- Mizuno Morinobu (1626–1629)
- Takenaka Shigeyoshi (1629–1634)
- Imamura Masanaga (1633–1634)
- Sakakibara Motonao (1634–1640)
- Kamio Motokatsu (1634–1638)
- Ōkōchi Masakatsu (1638–1640)
- Tsuge Masatoki (1640–1642)
- Baba Toshishige (1642–1650)
- Yamazaki Masanobu (1642–1650)
- Kurokawa Masanao (1650–1665)
- Kaijō Masanobu (1651–1660)
- Ushigome Chūzaemon Shigenori (1671–1681).
- Yamaoka Kagesuke (1687–1694)
- Miyagi Masazumi (1687–1696)
- Niwa Nagamori (1699–1702)
- Ōshima Yoshinari (1699–1703)
- Sakuma Nobunari (1703–1713)
- Hisamatsu Sadamochi (1710–1715)
- Ōoka Kiyosuke (1711–1717)
- Ōmori Tokinaga (1732–1734)
- Hagiwara Yoshimasa (1736–1743)
- Matsunami Heizaemon (1744)
- Kondō Jūzō (1747).

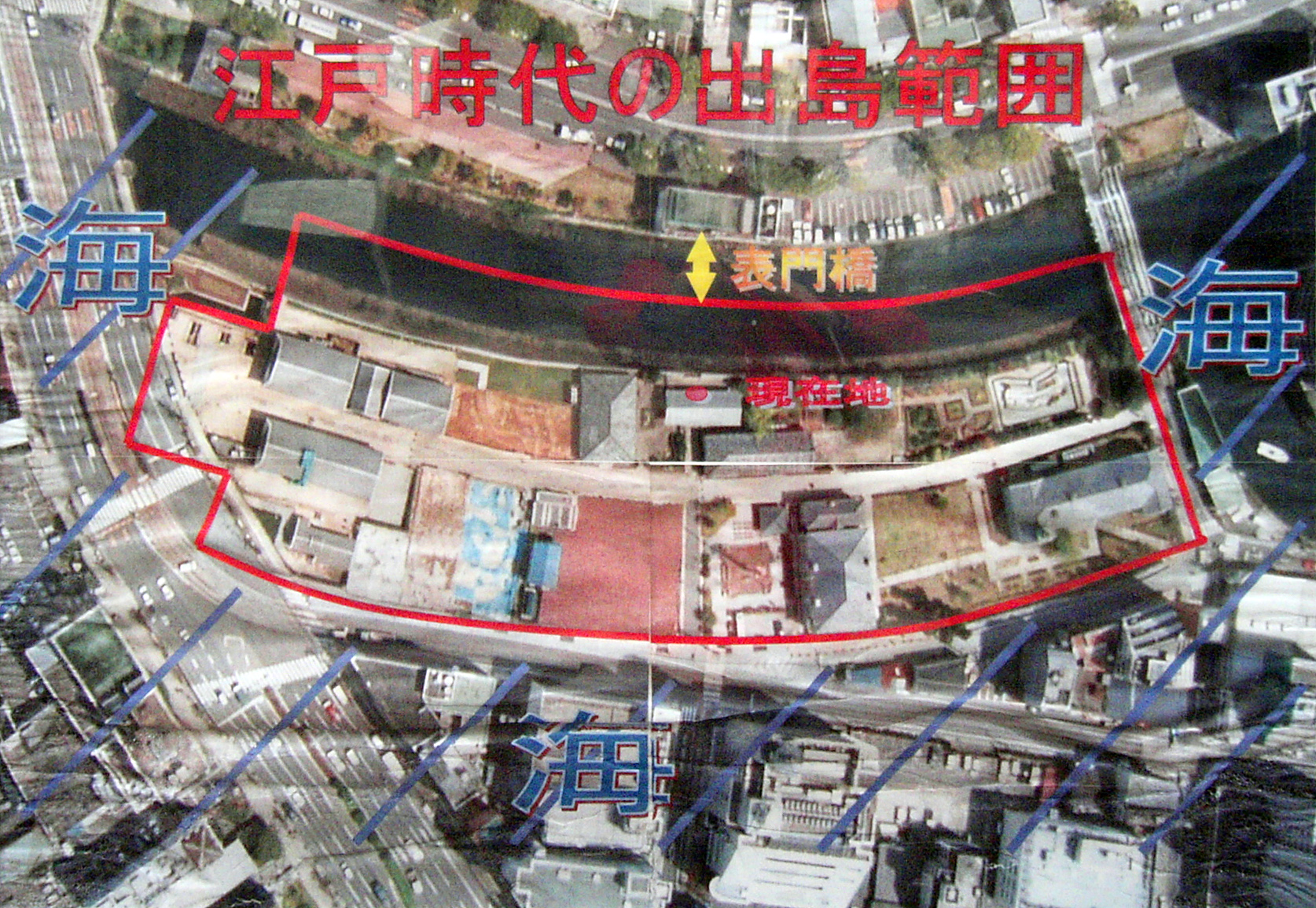
Edo-era boundaries of Dejima island (outlined in red) within the modern city of Nagasaki. What happened on this tiny piece of land became the central focus of attention for each of the serial Nagasaki bugyō. The post-Pacific War city enveloped and surrounded the former island; and a portion of the former island was demolished to widen the riverside transportation artery at the top of the picture. This photograph is taken from a sign posted at Dejima in 2004, showing the reconstruction work as Dutch-era buildings were in the process of being recreated one-by-one based upon old pictures and models. This revival of interest in Dejima re-animates the need to know more about the Nagasaki administrators -- their work, their problems, their lives.

- Ōoka Tadayori (1763–1764)
- Kurihara Morisada (1773–1775)
- Kuze Hirotami (1775–1784).
- Tsuge Masakore (1781-17__).
- Tsuchiya Morinao (1783–1784).
- Tsuchiya Masanobu (1784–1785).
- Toda Ujiharu (1784–1786),
- Tsuge Hirotami (1786).
- _________________ (1793).
- Matsudaira Yasuhide (1807–1808)
- Tōyama Kagekuni (1812–1816)
- Matsuyama Naoyoshi (1815–1817)
- Kanezawa Chiaki (1816–1818)
- Tsutsui Masanori (1817–1821)
- Izawa Masayoshi (1842–1845).
- Ido Satohiro (1845–1849).
- Mizuno Tadanori (1853–1854, 1857–1858).
- Arao Narimasa (1854–1859).
- Arao Shigemitsu(1854–1859)
- Takahashi Kazunuki (1862).
- Sugiura Katsukiyo (1863)
- Kyōgoku Takaakira (1863)
- Ōmura Sumihiro (1863)
- Hattori Tsunezumi (1863–1866)
- Asagara Masahiro (1864–1866)
- Kawazu Sukekuni (1867–1868).

== See also ==
- Bugyō
