= Ōmura Sumihiro =

Ōmura Sumihiro 大村 純熈
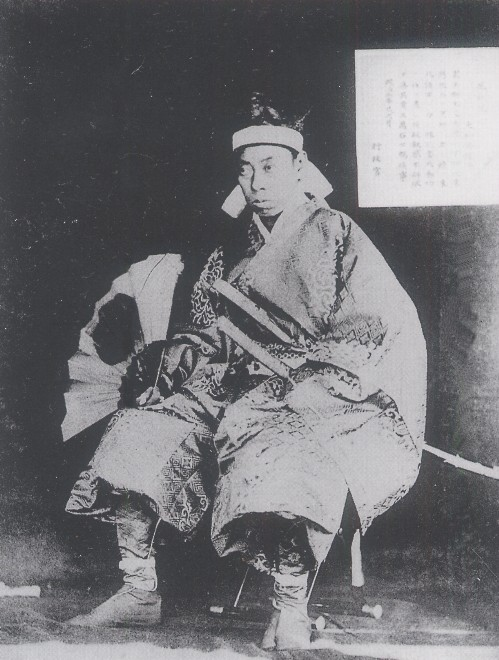
- Ōmura Sumihiro c. 1870, at end of Boshin War

Daimyō of Ōmura
- In office 1846–1871
- Preceded by: Ōmura Sumiaki
- Succeeded by: none

Personal details
- Born: January 5, 1830 Ōmura, Japan
- Died: January 13, 1882 (aged 52) Tokyo, Japan

Ōmura Sumihiro (大村 純熈; January 4, 1830 – January 13, 1882) was the 12th and final daimyō of Ōmura Domain in Hizen Province, Kyūshū, Japan. His courtesy title was Tango-no-kami.

== Biography ==
Sumihiro was born at Kushima Castle, the ancestral Ōmura residence in Hizen, as the 10th son of Ōmura Sumiyoshi, the 10th daimyo of Ōmura. When his elder brother, Ōmura Sumiaki became 11th daimyo of Ōmura in 1846, Sumihiro was officially adopted as his son and heir. Sumiaki was sickly, and retired from his duties in December 1846, and Sumihiro became the 12th daimyo of Ōmura on February 21, 1847.

Sumihiro was an active ruler, interested in both rangaku and classical learning, and concerned with the direction the country was taking into the unsettled Bakumatsu period. In 1862, he formed an alliance with neighboring Hirado Domain. Sumihiro was considered a strong Tokugawa loyalist, and in 1863 was entrusted with the important position of Nagasaki bugyō, but defected after only a year to become a supporter of the Sonnō jōi movement.

During the Boshin War of the Meiji Restoration, he commanded his forces as part of the Satchō Alliance in support of Emperor Meiji, and fought against the Tokugawa remnants of the Ōuetsu Reppan Dōmei in northern Japan.

In June 1868, in return for his loyalty to the new government, the revenues of Ōmura domain were raised to 30,000 koku. However, with the abolition of the han system later that year, he surrendered his office to the central government and was appointed domain governor until Ōmura domain was absorbed into Nagasaki Prefecture in July 1871.

He was awarded Third Court rank on his deathbed in January 1882, and was posthumously raised to Second Court rank in 1903. His grave is at Aoyama Cemetery in Tokyo.

His son, Ōmura Sumio was elevated to the rank of viscount (shishaku) in the new kazoku peerage system in 1884, and further elevated to count (hakushaku) in 1891. However, as he had no son, he adopted his son-in-law, the son of Shimazu Tadahiro to be his heir.

Preceded by Ōmura Sumiaki	10th Daimyō of Ōmura; 1846–1871	Succeeded by none
