= The Resurrection of the Golden Wolf =

- Theatrical release poster
- Directed by: Tōru Murakawa
- Screenplay by: Hideichi Nagahara
- Based on: Yomigaeru Kinrō by Haruhiko Oyabu
- Starring: Yūsaku Matsuda; Jun Fubuki; Sonny Chiba
- Cinematography: Seizō Sengen
- Edited by: Akira Suzuki
- Distributed by: Toei Company
- Release date: August 25, 1979 (Japan)
- Running time: 131 minutes
- Country: Japan
- Language: Japanese
- Box office: ¥1.042 billion (distributor rentals)

The Resurrection of the Golden Wolf (Japanese: 蘇る金狼, Hepburn: Yomigaeru Kinrō) is a 1979 Japanese crime thriller film directed by Tōru Murakawa, based on a novel of the same name by Haruhiko Oyabu. It stars Yūsaku Matsuda as a criminal who disguises himself as a salaryman, and Jun Fubuki as his girlfriend. The film was theatrically released by Toei Company on August 25, 1979, in Japan.

== Plot ==
Tetsuya Asakura, a mild-mannered accountant works for an oil company by day and as a bank-robbing assassin by night. Hell-bent on bringing his corporation down, he finds he's not the only one as another criminal blackmails the top officials from the corporation. As loyalties are tested and double-crossed, Asakura soon finds himself in a deadly battle with the mafia.

== Cast ==
- Yūsaku Matsuda as Tetsuya Asakura
- Jun Fubuki
- Kei Satō
- Koichi Iwaki
- Kyosuke Machida
- Asao Koike
- Mikio Narita
- Yutaka Nakajima
- Sonny Chiba as Mitsuhiko Sakurai
- Kimie Shingyoji as Eriko Shimizu
