= House on Fire (film) =

1986 film by Kinji Fukasaku

- Theatrical release poster
- Directed by: Kinji Fukasaku
- Screenplay by: Fumio Konami
- Based on: House on Fire by Kazuo Dan
- Starring: Ken Ogata; Ayumi Ishida
- Cinematography: Daisaku Kimura
- Edited by: Isamu Ichida
- Music by: Takayuki Inoue
- Distributed by: Toei Company
- Release date: April 12, 1986 (Japan)
- Running time: 132 minutes
- Country: Japan
- Language: Japanese

House on Fire (Japanese: 火宅の人, Hepburn: Kataku no hito) is a 1986 Japanese drama film directed by Kinji Fukasaku. It was chosen as Best Film at the Japan Academy Prize ceremony. The film grossed ¥1.010 billion in Japan.

== Plot ==
Kazuo's parents split up when he is young and he later experiences difficulties in his own relationships. Kazuo grows up to be a writer who wins the Naoki Prize for his literature. His son Jiro develops meningitis, leaving him paralyzed and mentally disabled. His wife Yoriko turns to spiritual religion and their marriage breaks down. He is invited to the construction of a memorial to his old friend Dazai in Aomori on August 9, the day his son fell ill, and Yoriko says that the spirits tell her that evil will ensue that day at the hand of a woman. Kazuo takes his young assistant Keiko with him to Aomori and they consummate their affair. When he returns, he confesses to Yoriko that he was with Keiko in Aomori and she says that she knows because she knows everything he does. Yoriko leaves him and threatens a costly divorce, while his children reject Keiko. Kazuo considers selling his house but one stormy evening Yoriko returns and comforts the children. She tells Kazuo that she will stay with the children and he can leave.

Kazuo rents an apartment for himself and Keiko in Asakusa. One day a year later, they find that it has been burgled by Kazuo's eldest son Ichiro from his first wife Ritsuko. Ichiro admits that he read Kazuo's book about his adultery and asks if he will write about the burglary. Keiko becomes pregnant but when Kazuo won't marry her she angrily says that she will have it aborted to continue her acting career and storms out. Mr. Nakajima from the publishing house tells Kazuo a rumor that Keiko has been sleeping with the power broker Mr. Shimamura, a man with underworld connections who may kill Kazuo. Despite the fact that his next manuscript is due the next day, Kazuo drowns his sorrows in alcohol and gets into a series of fistfights, waking up with his writing hand bandaged in the apartment of a helpful girl who calls herself Yoko. Without Keiko to help him, Kazuo asks Yoriko to type what he dictates in order to finish his manuscript by the pending deadline. The two then sorrowfully put Jiro in a care facility in order to simplify their own lives. Keiko has an abortion and returns to Kazuo, but when she learns that he had Yoriko help him with his manuscript she becomes incensed. Kazuo slaps her and she fights back. The neighbors break down the door because of the noise and ultimately Keiko kicks Kazuo out of the apartment.

Kazuo leaves Tokyo with cracked ribs and sails aimlessly across Japan while writing a serial about his journey. On the boat he encounters Yoko and accompanies her to her home on Nozaki Island, where he learns that her real name is Tokuko and that she was impregnated by her stepfather and had a stillborn child. As he is departing for Nagasaki, she jumps aboard his boat and runs away with him as her mother cries. They wander for three months living from fishing until Christmas, when she tells him that she is leaving him to accept a marriage proposal from a rich man from Singapore.

Kazuo goes to Keiko's apartment but finds that she is not there. He brings a yellowtail as a gift to Yoriko on New Year's Eve but must ask for money to pay for the taxi. On New Year's Day he finds his publishers gathered at his home to celebrate with Yoriko. During the celebrations he rushes out to visit Keiko but she has entered into a new love affair with her castmate Sasako. Yoriko calls Kazuo at Keiko's apartment to tell him that Jiro has died. Kazuo rushes to the hospital, where the doctor explains that Jiro dove headfirst into a wall imitating swimmers on television. Keiko sends Kazuo's possessions from their apartment back to his family home but keeps an old pair of shoes as a pretext to ask him to visit one last time. Keiko has emptied their old apartment and packed to leave. She gives him a photo they took of themselves in front of a waterfall in Aomori, then they drink one last glass of beer together. He suggests another but she says that she has an engagement. On the walk home, Kazuo throws away the shoes and tears up the photo. His wife finds him there while on her way to go shopping and his children attempt to identify the other person in the photo but she stops them. Kazuo asks her to buy some Chinese cabbage to pickle because he will be staying a while. She says that she thought he would say that because she knows everything he does. Kazuo lets all of his children climb on him and he happily carries them home.

== Cast ==
- Ken Ogata as Katsura Kazuo
- Ayumi Ishida as Katsura Yoriko
- Mieko Harada as Yajima Keiko
- Keiko Matsuzaka as Tanayoshi Tokuko
- Chu Arai
- Fumi Dan as Kazuo's mother
- Hisashi Igawa
- Renji Ishibashi
- Atomu Shimojō
- Hatsuo Yamatani
- Hiroyuki Sanada as Chuya Nakahara
