= My Soul Is Slashed =

1991 Japanese film

- Theatrical release poster
- Directed by: Shūsuke Kaneko
- Written by: Shūsuke Kaneko; Chigusa Shiota
- Produced by: Shohei Kota; Mistuo Sato; Nobuaki Murooka
- Starring: Ken Ogata
- Cinematography: Koichi Kawakami
- Edited by: Isao Tomita
- Music by: Kow Otani
- Distributed by: Toho
- Release date: 1991
- Running time: 98 minutes
- Country: Japan
- Language: Japanese

My Soul Is Slashed (咬みつきたい, Kamitsukitai; lit. 'I want to bite'), also known as From Dracula with Love, is a 1991 Japanese comedy horror film directed by Shūsuke Kaneko. It stars Ken Ogata as a pharmaceutical company employee who finds himself in intensive care after a critical injury. During a transfusion, he is given the blood of Count Dracula.

== Plot ==
After the complete destruction of Count Dracula, his vampiric blood arrives in Japan, where a young scientist who is researching vampires hides it in a hospital for later experiments.

At the same time, Shutaro Ishikawa, who works for a pharmaceutical company, discovers a scandal, but is killed before he can make it public. In the hospital, he accidentally receives some of Dracula's blood. The young scientist tells the daughter of Shutaro to drop blood on his ashes to allow him to revive.

One year later, Shutaro is reborn as a vampire. After some familiarization with his situation and help from his daughter and the scientist, his goal is to avenge his murder by feasting on the blood of the strong and virile.

== Cast ==
- Ken Ogata as Shutaro Ishikawa
- Hideyo Amamoto as Servant
- Harumi Harada as Takeda
- Sumiyo Hasegawa as Enokida
- Hikari Ishida as Saeko
- Narumi Yasuda as Yuzuko

== Reception ==
Hikari Ishida won seven awards for Best New Actress: Japan Academy Awards, Blue Ribbon Awards, Hochi Film Awards, Kinema Junpo Awards, Mainichi Film Concours, Nikkan Sports Film Award, Yokohama Film Festival.

Ken Ogata was nominated as Best Actor for the 1992 Japan Academy Awards, but did not win.
