= Kuniko Mukōda =

Japanese television screenwriter

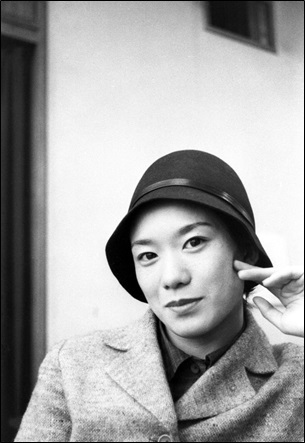
- Born: Kuniko Mukōda; November 28, 1929; Wakabayashi, Setagaya, Ebara-gun, Tokyo Prefecture, Japan
- Died: August 22, 1981 (aged 51); Sanyi, Miaoli, Taiwan
- Occupations: Screenwriter, novelist, essayist
- Years active: 1952–1981

Kuniko Mukōda (向田 邦子, Mukōda Kuniko; November 28, 1929 – August 22, 1981) was a Japanese TV screenwriter. Most of her scripts focus on day-to-day family life and relationships. She won the 83rd Naoki Prize (1980上) for her short stories "Hanano Namae", "Kawauso" and "Inugoya."

== Life ==
Mukōda was born in Tokyo, and moved around Japan in her early life due to her father's job. After she graduated from Jissen Women's College (Jissen Women's University), she got a job at Ondori Company, a film publicity company, in 1952. In 1960, she left the company and became a screenwriter and radiowriter. On August 22, 1981, she died on Far Eastern Air Transport Flight 103 when it crashed in Taiwan.

== Works ==
Mukōda is the author of the novel A, Un which she adapted from her screenplay of the same name. The trio of stories for which she was awarded the Naoki prize were later published in the collection Omoide toranpu. Other short stories by Mukōda include:

- Small Change
- I Doubt It
- Manhattan
- Beef Shoulder
- The Fake Egg
- Triangular Chop
- Mr. Carp
- Ears
- Half-Moon
- The Window
- Meeting Again
- Ashura no Gotoku – Aired as a 2-part TV series in 1979. A film remake directed by Yoshimitsu Morita was released in 2003, as well as a 7-episode remake directed by Hirokazu Kore-eda that aired in January 2025, titled Asura.
