= Ōmura Yoshiaki =

Japanese leader in the feudal era

- 大村 喜前

Daimyō of Ōmura
- In office 1587–1615
- Preceded by: Ōmura Sumitada
- Succeeded by: Ōmura Sumiyori

Personal details
- Born: c. 1568
- Died: September 18, 1615
- Resting place: Honkyoji Temple (Omura City)
- Parent: Ōmura Sumitada (father)

Ōmura Yoshiaki (大村 喜前; 1568 – 18 September 1615) was a ruling head of the clan of Ōmura throughout the latter Sengoku period of Feudal Japan. As Yoshiaki was the respective son of Ōmura Sumitada, he followed his father in succession at some variable time, at which relations with the Jesuits and trade with the Portuguese had been already firmly developed.

In 1570, Yoshiaki was baptised into Christianity and given the name Dom Sancho. Following Ryūzōji Takanobu's suppression of the Omura in the year of 1580, it can be surmised that Yoshiaki then followed with support beneath the former, at which he would retain the lowly position of vassal up until the Toyotomis' rise to prominence after 1584. Supporting Toyotomi Hideyoshi initially during the Korean campaign of 1592, Yoshiaki's mutual support following this scenario is relatively unknown, but it is recorded that he at least chose to remain as a neutral power by the year 1600, when he declined the proposal to attend the Sekigahara Campaign.

Though Yoshiaki was subsequently forced to stand down in favour of his son, Sumitada, as a consequence of his failure to support the Tokugawa's Eastern Army in Sekigahara, Yoshiaki still entered the Edo period with a level of authority over the Omura, which he justified by means of expelling the Jesuits from his domain after a show of defiance at Nagasaki port.

Around 1606, Yoshiaki apostatised from Christianity. Initially following this, Yoshiaki persecuted Christianity in his domain and enforced Buddhism, possibly to appear favourably to Tokugawa Ieyasu and potentially redeem rank that could benefit his social position. As his Christian name "Dom Sancho" was additionally discarded, Yoshiaki's life following this period in time is unknown. He died by the year 1615.
