= Like Asura =

- Poster
- Directed by: Yoshimitsu Morita
- Screenplay by: Tomomi Tsutsui
- Based on: Ashura no Gotoku by Kuniko Mukōda
- Produced by: Kei Haruna; Minami Ichikawa; Kazuko Misawa
- Starring: Shinobu Otake; Eri Fukatsu; Kaoru Yachigusa; Shidou Nakamura; Hitomi Kuroki
- Cinematography: Nobuyasu Kita
- Edited by: Shinji Tanaka
- Music by: Kow Otani; Michiru Ōshima; Brigitte Fontaine
- Production companies: Mainichi Shimbun; Nippan Group Holdings; Hakuhodo; Toho
- Distributed by: Toho
- Release date: 8 November 2003 (Japan)
- Running time: 135 minutes
- Country: Japan
- Language: Japanese

Like Asura (Japanese: 阿修羅のごとく, Hepburn: Ashura no Gotoku) is a 2003 Japanese drama film directed by Yoshimitsu Morita. At the 27th Japan Academy Film Prizes, it won three awards and received ten other nominations. The film is a remake of the TV miniseries Ashura no Gotoku on NHK.

== Synopsis ==
The film follows four sisters who discover that their elderly father is having an affair. When a letter is published in the newspaper detailing the affair, they try to hide it from their mother, while suspecting each other of having written it.

== Cast ==
- Shinobu Otake
- Eri Fukatsu
- Kaoru Yachigusa
- Shidou Nakamura
- Hitomi Kuroki
- Kyoko Fukada
- Kaoru Kobayashi
- Nakamura Shidō II
- Misako Konno
- Tatsuya Nakadai

== Awards and nominations ==
27th Japan Academy Film Prizes.

- Won: Best Director - Yoshimitsu Morita
- Won: Best Screenplay - Tomomi Tsutsui
- Won: Best Actress in a Supporting Role - Eri Fukatsu
- Nominated: Best Picture
- Nominated: Best Actress - Shinobu Otake
- Nominated: Best Actress in a Supporting Role - Kaoru Yachigusa
- Nominated: Best Actor in a Supporting Role - Nakamura Shidō II
- Nominated: Best Music - Michiru Ōshima, Kow Otani
- Nominated: Best Cinematography - Nobuyasu Kita
- Nominated: Best Lighting Direction - Koichi Watanabe
- Nominated: Best Art Direction - Hidemitsu Yamasaki
- Nominated: Best Sound Recording - Fumio Hashimoto
- Nominated: Best Film Editing - Shinji Tanaka
