= Fujiwara no Sumitomo =

Japanese Heian era court noble and warrior

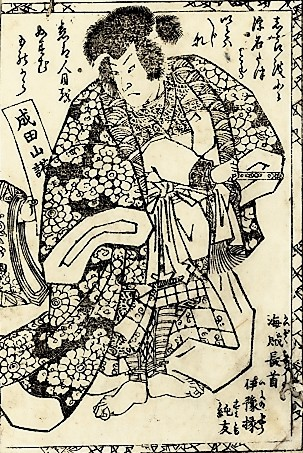
Fujiwara no Sumitomo

Fujiwara no Sumitomo (藤原 純友; died 941) was a Japanese Heian era court noble and warrior. From 939 to 941, he aided the Taira clan in a series of revolts.

Sumitomo built his power base in Northern Kyushu. After making a secret agreement with Taira no Masakado, who was leading a revolt in Shimōsa Province, Sumitomo led his own revolt in Iyo province in 939, and soon afterwards invaded the provinces of Harima and Bizen. The revolt quickly spread throughout the whole San'yō region.

Pursued by imperial forces led by Ono no Yoshifuru and Minamoto no Tsunemoto, Sumitomo fled to Dazaifu, burning down the Dazaifu headquarters before he was defeated in battle at Hakata Bay. He then fled back to Iyo province, where he was captured. He was executed shortly afterwards, in 941, by Tachibana no Tōyasu.

His father was Fujiwara no Yoshinori, and he was the ancestor of the Arima clan of Hizen province.
