= Jiraiya (disambiguation) =

Jiraiya is the title character of the Japanese folk tale Jiraiya Gōketsu Monogatari.

Jiraiya may also refer to:

- Jiraiya (Naruto), character from the manga and anime series Naruto
- Jiraiya (artist) (b. 1967), Japanese gay manga artist
- Ikazuchi-Maru/Jiraiya, character in The Magic Serpent (1966)
- Touha Yamaji/Jiraiya, character in Sekai Ninja Sen Jiraiya (1988)
- Jiraiya/Ninja Black, character in Ninja Sentai Kakuranger (1994)
