= Amigasa Jūbei =

Japanese television series

- Japanese: 編笠十兵衛
- Genre: Jidaigeki
- Directed by: Tokuzō Tanaka; Kazuo Ikehiro
- Starring: Hideki Takahashi; Shigeru Tsuyuguchi; Mikio Narita; Ryūtarō Ōtomo; Yūnosuke Itō; Yoshi Katō; Chiezō Kataoka
- Theme music composer: Takeo Watanabe
- Country of origin: Japan
- Original language: Japanese
- No. of episodes: 26

Production
- Running time: 45 minutes (per episode)
- Production companies: Fuji TV, TOEI

Original release
- Network: Fuji TV
- Release: October 1974 – April 1975

Amigasa Jūbei (編笠十兵衛) is a Japanese television jidaigeki or period drama that was broadcast from 1974 to 1975. It is based on Shōtarō Ikenami's novel by the same title. It depicts the stories of Tsukimori Jūbei and the Forty-seven rōnin. A remake was aired in 1997 on Fuji television.

== Plot ==
Tsukimori Jūbei is an Onmitsu(Oniwaban). He and Masafuyu Nakane help Forty-seven rōnin′s revenge. On the other hand, Kobayashi Haihachi attempts to stop it and protect Kira Yoshinaka in various ways by Uesugi Noritsuna's(Kira Yoshinaka's son.) order.

In addition, Funazu challenges Jūbei to a duel again and again, and tries to kill Jūbei persistently.

== Characters ==
- Hideki Takahashi : Tsukimori Jūbei (Amigasa Jūbei)
- Shigeru Tsuyuguchi : Heyhachi kobayashi
- Mikio Narita : Funazu Yakurō is a ruthless ronin.
- Yutaka Nakajima : Senya
- Goichi Yamada as Horibe Yasubei
- Takeya Nakamura : Ōishi Yoshio
- Go Wakabayashi : Fuwa Kazuemon
- Yoichi Hayashi : Kayano Sanpei
- Yumiko Nogawa : Kaoru
- Susumu Kurobe :Nagai/Osu
- Taeko Hattori : Yae
- Isamu Nagato : Tawaraboshi Genba
- Yuko Hama : Minae
- Jūkei Fujioka : Nagao Kanbei
- Tatsuo Endō : Kajikawa Yoriteru
- Yoko Hayama : Oshun
- Yoshio Inaba : Uchida Saburozaemon
- Akira Nakao : Tada Dempachiro
- Hiroko Fuji : Shizue
- Yoshi Katō : Kayano Hichirozaemon
- Eiji Okada : Yanagisawa Yoshiyasu
- Yūnosuke Itō : Kira Yoshinaka
- Ryūtarō Ōtomo : Okuda Magodayou
- Chiezō Kataoka : Nakane Masafuyu

== Episodes ==
- 1, Tosho directed by Tokuzō Tanaka
- 2, Seppuku directed by Tokuzō Tanaka
- 3, Ketsudan directed by Masatake Matsuo
- 4, Shugeki directed by Masatake Mastuo
- 5, Zansatsu directed by Masahiko Izawa
- 6, Tsuioku directed by Masahiko Izawa
- 7, Shikyaku directed by Masatake Matsuo
- 8, Shuppu directed by Masatake Matsuo
- 9, Enjō directed by Kazuo Ikehiro
- 10, Bojō directed by Kazuo Ikehiro
- 11, Datsuraku directed by Masatake Matsuo
- 12, Danatsu directed by Masatake Matsuo
- 13, Kuromaku directed by Masatake Matsuo
- 14, Sennyu directed by Masatake Matsuo
- 15, Giwaku directed by Masatake Matsuo
- 16, Tsuiseki directed by Tokuzō Tanaka
- 17, Kenshin directed by Tokuzō Tanaka
- 18, Bōky directed by Tokuzō Tanaka
- 19, Hidō directed by Masatake Matsuo
- 20, Shikon directed by Masatake Matsuo
- 21, Bōryaku directed by Masahiko Izawa
- 22, Chusedtsu directed by Masahiko Izawa
- 23, Kansei directed by Buichi Saitō
- 24, Zenya directed by Masahiko Izawa
- 25, Uchiiri directed by Masatake Matsuo
- 26, Ketsubetsu directed by Masatake Matsuo
