= Charles Sanford Terry =

Charles Sanford Terry may refer to:

- Charles Sanford Terry (historian) (1864–1936), English historian and authority on Johann Sebastian Bach
- Charles Sanford Terry (translator) (1926–1982), American translator of Japanese literature
