= Kajikawa =

Kajikawa (written: 梶川) is a Japanese surname. Notable people with the surname include:

- Bill Kajikawa (1912–2010), American basketball coach
- Hiroshi Kajikawa (梶川 博, born 1949), Japanese archer
- Ryota Kajikawa (梶川 諒太, born 1989), Japanese footballer
- Takayoshi Kajikawa (梶川 孝義, born 1934), Japanese swimmer
- Takeshi Kajikawa (梶川 武志, born 1971), Japanese golfer
- Kajikawa Yoriteru (梶川 頼照, 1647–1722), Japanese samurai
