= Yoshikawa (crater) =

Crater on Mercury

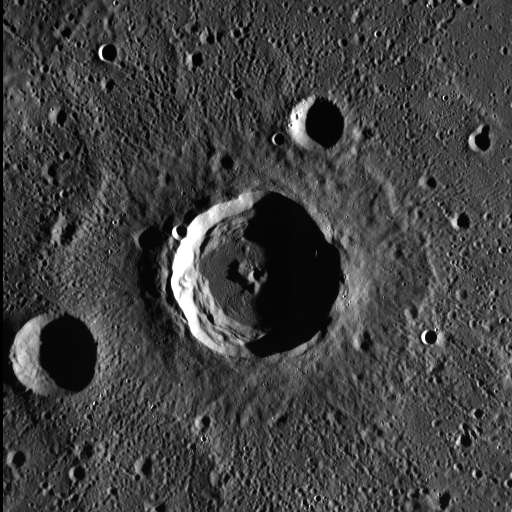
- MESSENGER image
- Planet: Mercury
- Coordinates: 81.21°N 253.97°W
- Quadrangle: Borealis
- Diameter: 30 km (19 mi)
- Eponym: Eiji Yoshikawa

Yoshikawa is a crater on Mercury, near the north pole. It was named by the IAU in 2012 after the Japanese novelist Eiji Yoshikawa.

S band radar data from the Arecibo Observatory collected between 1999 and 2005 indicates a radar-bright area along the southern interior of Yoshikawa, which is probably indicative of a water ice deposit, and lies within the permanently shadowed part of the crater.

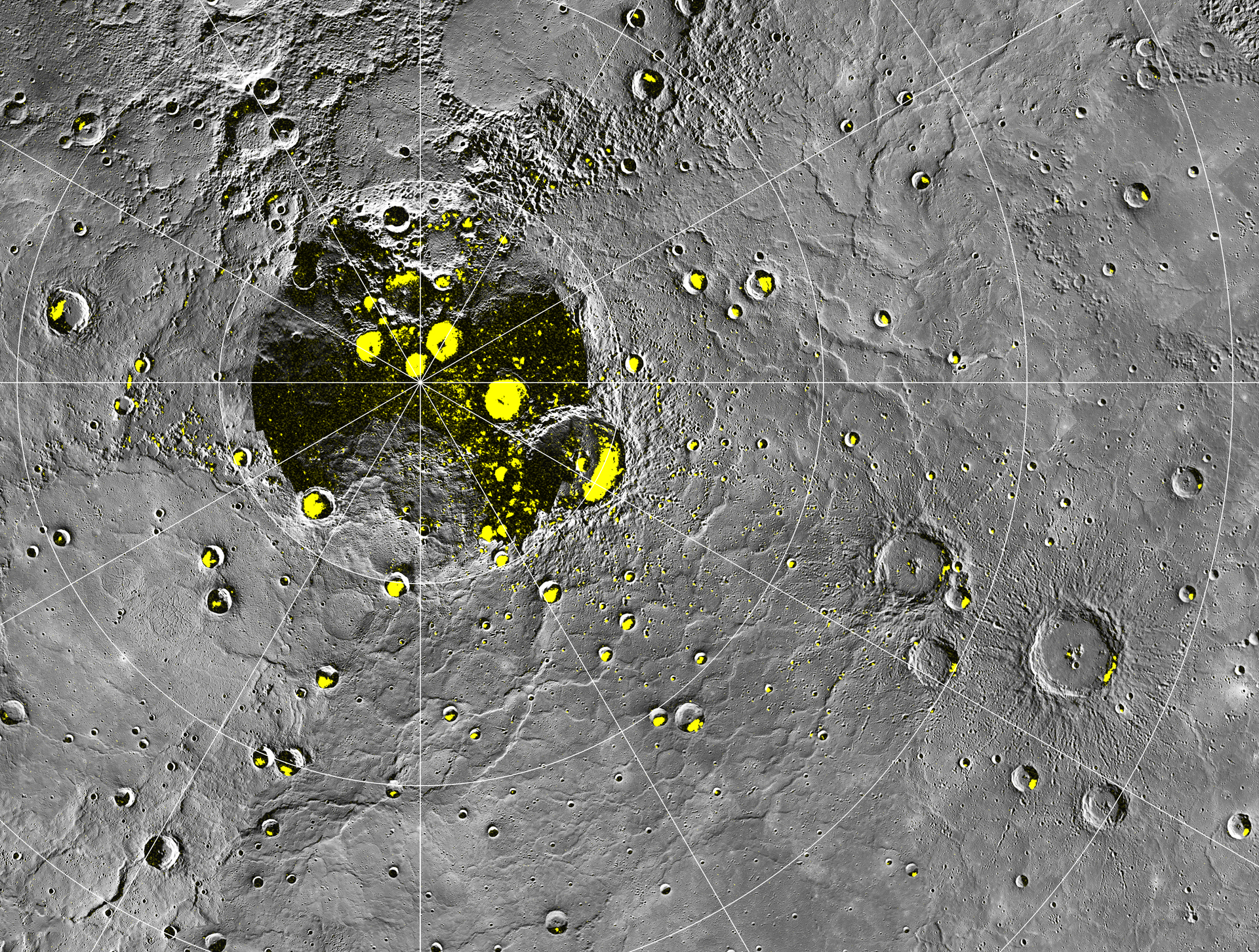
Radar-bright deposits near the north pole. Yoshikawa is above center.

Yoshikawa is south of the slightly smaller Vonnegut crater.
