= Hissatsu Shimainin =

Japanese TV drama series

- Also known as: 必殺仕舞人
- Genre: Jidaigeki
- Directed by: Tokuzō Tanaka; Umetsugu Inoue; Eiichi Kudo
- Starring: Machiko Kyō; Etsushi Takahashi; Hirotaro Honda; Midori Nishizaki
- Country of origin: Japan
- Original language: Japanese
- No. of episodes: 13

Production
- Producers: Hisashi Yamauchi; Rikyū Nakagawa
- Running time: 45 minutes (per episode)
- Production companies: Asahi Broadcasting Corporation; Shochiku

Original release
- Network: ANN (ABC, TV Asahi)
- Release: 1981 – 1981

Hissatsu Shimainin (必殺仕舞人) is a Japanese television jidaigeki or period drama that was broadcast in 1981. It is the 16th in the Hissatsu series. In 1982 the sequel drama Shin Hissatsu Shimainin (18th in the Hissatsu series) was produced by the same cast. The drama features several aikido-based action scenes choreographed by Steven Seagal under the name of 武榮道, prior to the start of his own film career.

== Cast ==
- Machiko Kyō as Bantokyozan
- Etsushi Takahashi as Shinmatsu
- Hirotarō Honda as Naojiro
- Midori Nishizaki as Ohana

Hissatsu Shimainin
- Also known as: Shin・Hissatsu Shimainin
- 新・必殺仕舞人
- Genre: Jidaigeki
- Directed by: Tokuzō Tanaka; Umetsugu Inoue
- Starring: Machiko Kyō; Etsushi Takahashi; Hirotaro Honda; Midori Nishizaki
- Country of origin: Japan
- Original language: Japanese
- No. of episodes: 13

Production
- Producers: Hisashi Yamauchi; Rikyū Nakagawa
- Running time: 45 minutes (per episode)
- Production companies: Asahi Broadcasting Corporation; Shochiku

Original release
- Network: ANN (ABC, TV Asahi)
- Release: July 2 – September 24, 1982
