= The Magic Serpent =

- Theatrical release poster
- Directed by: Tetsuya Yamanochi
- Screenplay by: Masaru Igami
- Story by: Mokuami Kawatake
- Produced by: Shigeru Okawa
- Starring: Hiroki Matsukata; Ryūtarō Ōtomo; Nobuo Kaneko
- Cinematography: Motonari Washio
- Edited by: Tadao Kanda
- Music by: Toshiaki Tsushima
- Production company: Toei
- Distributed by: Toei (Japan); American International Television (United States)
- Release date: 21 December 1966 (Japan)
- Running time: 86 minutes
- Country: Japan
- Language: Japanese

The Magic Serpent (怪竜大決戦, Kairyū daikessen; lit. 'Great Dragon Battle') is a 1966 tokusatsu fantasy film directed by Tetsuya Yamanochi, with special effects by Shigeru Akatsuka and Kunio Kunisada. Produced and distributed by Toei Company, it loosely adapts the story of Jiraiya. In the film, a young prince returns to reclaim his father's throne from the tyrannical despot and dragon-summoning samurai that usurped him.

== Plot ==
In the Ōmi Province of Japan, the castle of Lord Ogata Samanosuke is besieged by ninjas. He learns that his subordinate Yuki Daijo is leading the coup and is murdered by him, while Daijo's partner Orochimaru kills Lady Ogata to stop her from escaping. A few servants loyal to Lord Ogata help his son Ikazuchimaru escape, but they are attacked by a serpent-like dragon. An eagle appears and injures the dragon long enough to save Ikazuchimaru, who takes him to an old sorcerer, Gama Dojin, in Gamagatake in Hida Province.

Dojin raises and trains Ikazuchimaru for the next fourteen years, until ninjas arrive to assassinate them. Ikazuchimaru emerges victorious against the ninjas and attempts to chase the last one, only to discover it is a harmless young woman named Tsunade; the two become smitten with each other instantly. She explains she came to the mountain to find her long-lost father, who was last seen in the area years ago. Ikazuchimaru agrees to take her to Dojin, who is visited by Orochimaru. A former student of Dojin, Orochimaru begs for absolution after running off with the Rising Dragon scroll. However, Dojin sees through his deceit, noting the scar on Orochimaru's forehead — the same scar inflicted on the dragon by the eagle that saved Ikazuchimaru. Orochimaru then kills Dojin to stop him from aiding Ikazuchimaru further. Later, Ikazuchimaru and Tsunade find Dojin dying in his hut. Before his death, Dojin reveals to Ikazuchimaru his royal heritage, his parents' murder, and bequeaths to him a scroll that grants transformation into a giant toad; Dojin recognizes Tsunade moments before death. Before parting with Tsunade, they bury Dojin and Ikazuchimaru vows vengeance. Tsunade's grandmother, the Spider Witch, pays her final respects to Dojin and tries to convince Tsunade to abandon her search for her father. Tsunade refuses and is gifted a hair-pin that summons a giant spider to aid her.

Ikazuchimaru reaches Omni province where he befriends a farmer, Zenbei and his two kids, Koshirota and Saki. With guards on the lookout for Ikazuchimaru, the family is apprehended by Daijo, who kills Zenbei for aiding Ikazuchimaru for crossing into the province. Ikazuchimaru arrives to save Koshirota and Saki. As Ikazuchimaru attempts to kill Daijo, his thwarted by Orochimaru. Ikazuchimaru is forced to escape with Koshirota, leaving Saki behind. As they recover, Orochimaru uses bandits to spread news of Ikazuchimaru's return. He plans to steal Ikazuchimaru's identity and usurp Daijo. Ikazuchimaru and Koshirota later reunite with Tsunade, who is now accompanied by Momobei, one of Orochimaru's bandits who saved her from assault. They take refuge in a temple after Koshirota catches a fever, however, Tsunade is captured by another bandit and taken to Ogata Castle.

Orochimaru plans to use Tsunade as bait but learns, from Momobei, that she is his daughter. She proves this by revealing a piece of fabric that Orochimaru once gifted to a woman he had an affair with years ago. Orochimaru takes advantage of her emotional state by asking her to assassinate Ikazuchimaru; she reluctantly agrees. Tsunade and Momobei succeed in drugging Ikazuchimaru and Tsunade prepares to stab him but refuses at the last minute. Momobei swings his sword, but kills one of Orochimaru's spies instead. Tsunade and Momobei agree to aid Ikazuchimaru by luring Orochimaru to the temple, while Ikazuchimaru attacks the castle with a giant toad. Orochimaru learns from his dying spy that Tsunade and Momobei betrayed him. He kills Momobei and leaves Tsunade tied-up; Koshirota sets her and reunites his Saki at Ogata Castle.

After killing Daijo, Ikazuchimaru and Orochimaru duel in their beast forms, destroying the castle in the process. Orochimaru's dragon gets the upper hand, but is defeated after Tsunade summons a giant spider to help. Ikazuchimaru and Orochimaru continue their battle on the beach in their human forms, where Orochimaru is defeated. Ikazuchimaru refuses to reinstate the Ogata clan, instead leaving the land to farmers and citizens and choosing to live happily with Tsunade.

== Cast ==
- Hiroki Matsukata as Ikazuchimaru/Jiraiya
- Tomoko Ogawa as Tsunade
- Yumi Suzumura as Saki
- Bin Amatsu as Yuki Daijo
- Shinichiro Hayashi as Lord Ogata Samanosuke
- Nobuo Kaneko as Gama Dojin
- Kenji Kusumoto as a Bandit
- Toshio Chiba as Momobei
- Ryūtarō Ōtomo as Orochimaru
- Izumi Hara as Spider Witch
- Takao Iwamura as Koshirota

== Release ==
The Magic Serpent was released in Japan on December 21, 1966. The film was never released theatrically in the United States, but released directly to television by American International Television in 1968. Shout! Studios released the film, as Dragon Showdown, on Blu-ray for the first time on February 27, 2024; part of their "Classic Tokusatsu Collection" set.

== Footnotes ==
=== References ===
- Galbraith IV, Stuart (1996). The Japanese Filmography: 1900 through 1994. McFarland. ISBN 0-7864-0032-3.
