= Ryūtarō Ōtomo =

Japanese actor (1912–1985)

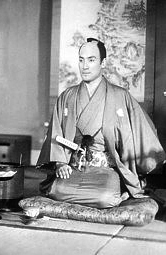
- Ryūtarō Ōtomo as Ogasawara Nagato-no-kami in the motion picture Tanosuke Beni (1947)
- Born: June 5, 1912; Hiroshima, Hiroshima, Japan
- Died: September 27, 1985 (aged 73); Minato, Tokyo, Japan
- Occupation: Actor
- Years active: 1937–1985

Ryūtarō Ōtomo (大友柳太朗, Ōtomo Ryūtarō) (5 June 1912 – 27 September 1985) was a Japanese film and television actor most famous for his starring roles in jidaigeki. In 1936, he made his debut in movies with the film Aozura Roshi. Overall Ryūtarō Ōtomo appeared in more than 100 movies.

He ended his life by leaping from the top of a building in 1985. His final appearance in the film was Tampopo directed by Juzo Itami in 1985.

== Filmography ==
=== Films ===
- Yoshida Palace (青空浪士 - Aozora rōshi - Blue Sky Roshi) (1937)
- (仇討崇禅寺馬場 Adauchi sōzenji baba) (1957)
- Akō Rōshi (赤穂浪士 Akō Rōshi) (1961)
- Castle of Owls (1963)
- The Magic Serpent (怪竜大決戦 Kairyū Daikessen) (1966)
- Eleven Samurai (1967) : Chief Retainer Akiyoshi Gyobu
- Yakuza's Law: Yakuza Keibatsushi: Rinchi (1969) : Tomozo
- Kagero-za (1981) : Shishō
- Tampopo (1985) : Noodle professor

=== Television ===
- Akō Roshi (1964) : Horiuchi
- Minamoto no Yoshitsune (1966)
- Ten to Chi to (1969) – Itagaki Nobukata
- Kunitori Monogatari (1973) – Takeda Shingen
- Shinsho Taikōki (1973) – Shimizu Muneharu
- Amigasa Jūbei (1974-75) - Okuda Magodayu
- Oshin (1983) as Eizo
