= Jiraiya the Hero =

1921 film

- full movie
- Directed by: Shōzō Makino
- Starring: See below
- Cinematography: Minoru Miki
- Release date: 1921
- Running time: 21 minutes (16 frame/s) (extant part)
- Country: Japan
- Language: Japanese

Jiraiya the Hero is a 1921 Japanese silent trick film directed by Shōzō Makino. The film is also known as Gōketsu Jiraiya (豪傑児雷也, original title).

== Cast ==
- Matsunosuke Onoe as Jiraiya
- Suminojo Ichikawa as Orochimaru
- Kijaku Otani as Tsukikagegunryo Miyukinosuke
- Chosei Kataoka as Tsunatehime
- Shoen Kataoka as Takasago Yuminosuke
- Enichiro Jitsukawa
- Ichitaro Kataoka
- Masatada Makino
