= William Scott Wilson =

Japanese-English translator (born 1944)

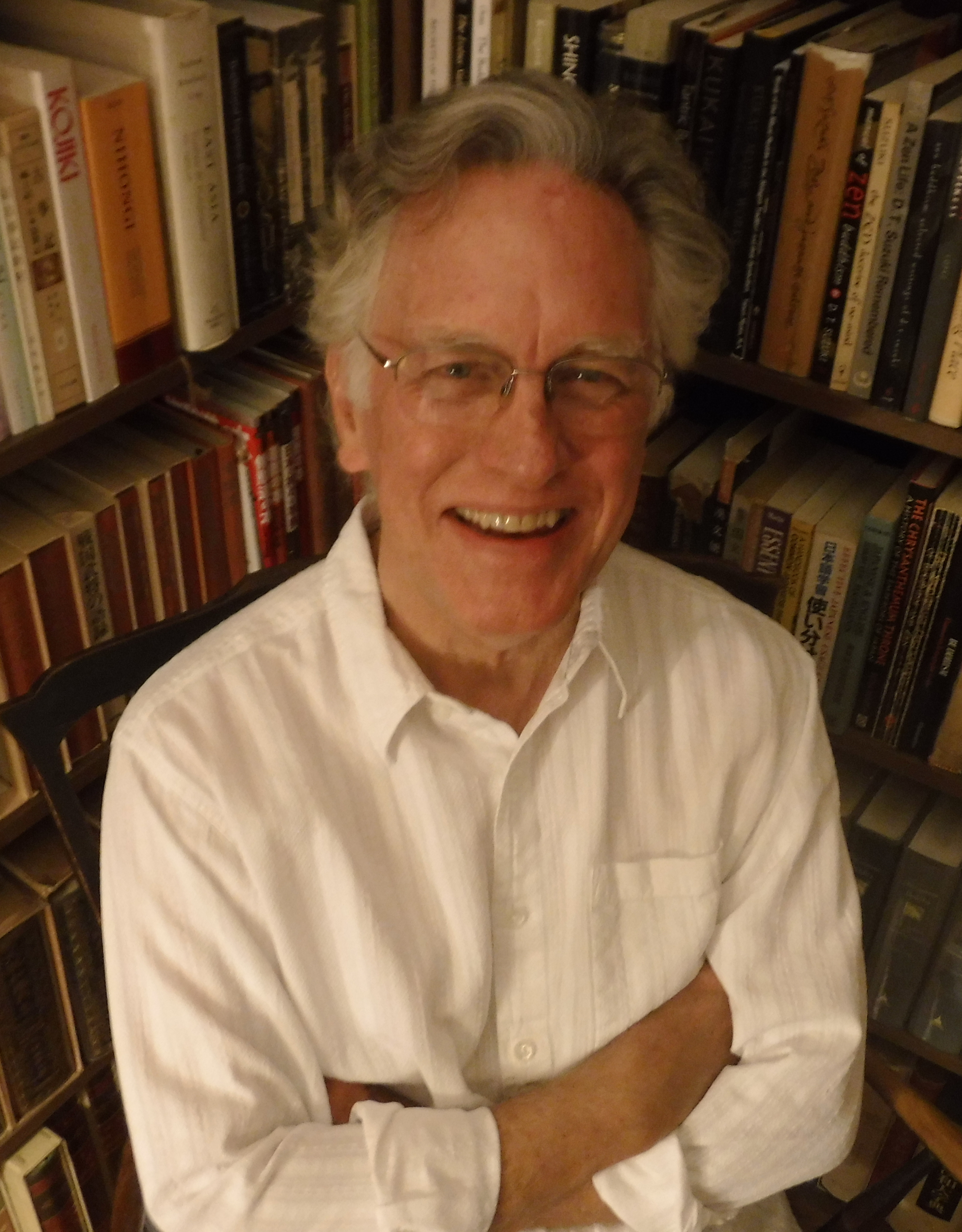
- Wilson in 2018
- Born: 1944 (age 81–82) Nashville, Tennessee, U.S.
- Occupation: Translator
- Education: Dartmouth College; Monterey Institute of Foreign Studies; Aichi Prefectural University; University of Washington
- Subject: Ancient Japanese literature
- Notable awards: Order of the Rising Sun

William Scott Wilson (born 1944) is an American translator, author and historian known for translating several works of Japanese literature, mostly those relating to the martial tradition of that country. Wilson has brought historical Chinese and Japanese thought, philosophy, and tactics to the West in his translations of famous East Asian literature.

Wilson's most notable translations include Hidden Leaves by Yamamoto Tsunetomo, which was featured in the film Ghost Dog: The Way of the Samurai (1999), The Book of Five Rings by Miyamoto Musashi, Taiko by Eiji Yoshikawa, and The Unfettered Mind by Takuan Sōhō.

== Early life ==
Prior to his career as a translator, Wilson received a Bachelor of Arts degree in Political Science at Dartmouth College.

In 1966, Wilson participated in a kayaking expedition from Shimonoseki to Tokyo and immediately began to appreciate Japanese culture. The following year, Wilson returned to Japan as a language teacher and lived in a 250-year-old farm house. In the two years he worked in Japan, Wilson began to read about Japanese literature from authors such as R. H. Blyth. Upon returning to the United States in 1969, Wilson went on to earn a second Bachelor of Arts in Japanese Language and Literature at the Monterey Institute of Foreign Studies.

In 1975, Wilson traveled to Nagoya to study Edo period philosophy at the Aichi Prefectural University, before heading back to Seattle in 1979 to earn a Master's Degree in Japanese Language and Literature at the University of Washington.

== Awards ==
On November 3, 2015, Wilson was awarded the Order of the Rising Sun, Gold Rays with Rosette, for "promoting understanding of Japan through the introduction of Japanese Literature in the United States."

Wilson received a commendation from Japan's Foreign Ministry in Miami on November 15, 2005. The award is "conferred upon individuals or groups that have rendered especially distinguished service in strengthening the relationship between Japan and other countries. Through his literary works and translations, Mr. Wilson has contributed greatly to increased cultural understanding and friendship between the US and Japan."

== Bibliography ==
=== Original works ===
- The Lone Samurai: The Life of Miyamoto Musashi, Kodansha International (October, 2004) ISBN 4-7700-2942-X
- Walking the Kiso Road, Shambhala Publications, 2015 ISBN 9781611801255

=== Translations ===
- Roots of Wisdom (Saikontan) (1984) ISBN 978-0870117015
- Ideals of the Samurai: Writings of Japanese Warriors (October 1982) ISBN 978-0897500814
- Hagakure (Hidden Leaves) by Yamamoto Tsunetomo (03/01/1983) ISBN 978-1937981419
- Budoshinshu: The Warrior's Primer by Daidōji Yuzan (04/01/1984) ISBN 978-0897500968
- The Unfettered Mind by Takuan Sōhō (12/01/1987) ISBN 978-1590309865
- Taiko: An Epic Novel of War and Glory in Feudal Japan by Eiji Yoshikawa (10/27/2000) ISBN 978-1568364285
- Go Rin no Sho (The Book of Five Rings) by Miyamoto Musashi (01/18/2002) ISBN 978-1419121906
- The Life-Giving Sword: Secret Teachings from the House of the Shogun (The Living Sword) by Yagyu Munenori (February 2004) ISBN 978-1590309902
- The Flowering Spirit: Classic Teachings on the Art of No by Zeami. Kodansha (release date: May 19, 2006) ISBN 4-7700-2499-1
- The Demon's Sermon on the Martial Arts by Issai Chozanshi. Kodansha International (release date: November 2006) ISBN 4-7700-3018-5
- The 36 Secret Strategies of the Martial Arts by Hiroshi Moriya (March 2008) ISBN 978-1590309926
- Yojokun: Life Lessons from a Samurai (The Way of the Warrior Series) by Kaibara Ekiken, Kodansha International (January 1, 2009) ISBN 978-4-7700-3077-1
- The Unencumbered Spirit: Reflections of a Chinese Sage, 2010, Kodansha International ISBN 4-7700-3097-5
- Tao Te Ching: A New Translation by Lao Tzu, Shambhala Publications, 2012 ISBN 159030991X
- Afoot in Japan by Yasumi Roan, 2015 ISBN 9781535503297
- The Life and Zen Haiku Poetry of Santoka Taneda by Sumita Oyama, Tuttle Publishing, 2021 [352 pp. 300 haiku and translator's introduction] ISBN 978-4-805316-55-9
