= Shōgun no Onmitsu! Kage Jūhachi =

- Also known as: 将軍の隠密!影十八
- Genre: Jidaigeki
- Directed by: Toru Murakawa; Shinichiro Sawai
- Starring: Kunihiko Mitamura; Yoko Minamino; Kōtarō Satomi; Takashi Sasano
- Country of origin: Japan
- Original language: Japanese
- No. of episodes: 19

Production
- Producer: Masaki Takahashi
- Running time: 54 minutes
- Production companies: TV Asahi; Toei Company

Original release
- Network: ANN (TV Asahi)
- Release: January 27 – June 29, 1996

Shōgun no Onmitsu! Kage Jūhachi (将軍の隠密!影十八) is a television jidaigeki series. It ran in prime time on the TV Asahi network in Japan. The first episode aired on January 27, 1996, and the 19th and final installment was broadcast on June 29 of that year. The series starred Kunihiko Mitamura with Yoko Minamino, Yūji Kishimoto, and Bengal as the team of secret agents working under the leadership of Kōtarō Satomi. Kyōko Tsujisawa also appeared regularly.

The series is set during the Edo period of the history of Japan. The eighth Tokugawa shōgun, Yoshimune, had officially had 17 families of oniwaban, his private ninja guards. The title group was the secret 18th group. The series begins some months after Yoshimune's death as his fourth son Hitotsubashi Munetada (Satomi) brings the group back together. The team leader is Kanō Ametarō (Mitamura), a hairdresser. The other members are Miki (Minamino), a doctor; Otojirō (a chef); and Inokichi (an acrobat). Oharu (Tsujisawa) owns the small restaurant where her brother Otojirō works.

Many actors and actresses appeared in guest roles. Among them were Hiroshi Arikawa, Yoriko Douguchi, Saiko Isshiki, Shun Ōide, Mitsutaka Tachikawa, Naoya Uchida, Kenichi Endō, Seizō Fukumoto, Ken Nishida, Shun'ya Wazaki, Yuki Ninagawa, Kenta Satoi, Hiroshi Miyauchi, Kei Taguchi, Susumu Kurobe, Seiichirō Kameishi, Shinsuke Mikimoto, Tsutomu Isobe, and Gorō Mutsumi. Three guests had portrayed oniwaban on the television series Abarenbō Shōgun, including the versions that preceded and followed Shōgun no Onmitsu! Kage Jūhachi in the same time slot on TV Asahi.

The closing theme is the song Utakata, sung by Mayumi Itsuwa.

The series originally appeared in the Saturday 8:00–8:54 p.m. prime-time slot on the TV Asahi network. It aired during the hiatus between the sixth and seventh versions of the jidaigeki Abarenbō Shōgun. The Jidaigeki Channel rebroadcast the series via satellite and cable.

== Sources ==
This article incorporates material found in 将軍の隠密!影十八 (Shōgun no Onmitsu! Kage Jūhachi) in the Japanese Wikipedia, retrieved on May 10, 2009.
