= Tokuzō Tanaka =

Japanese writer and director

Tokuzo Tanaka
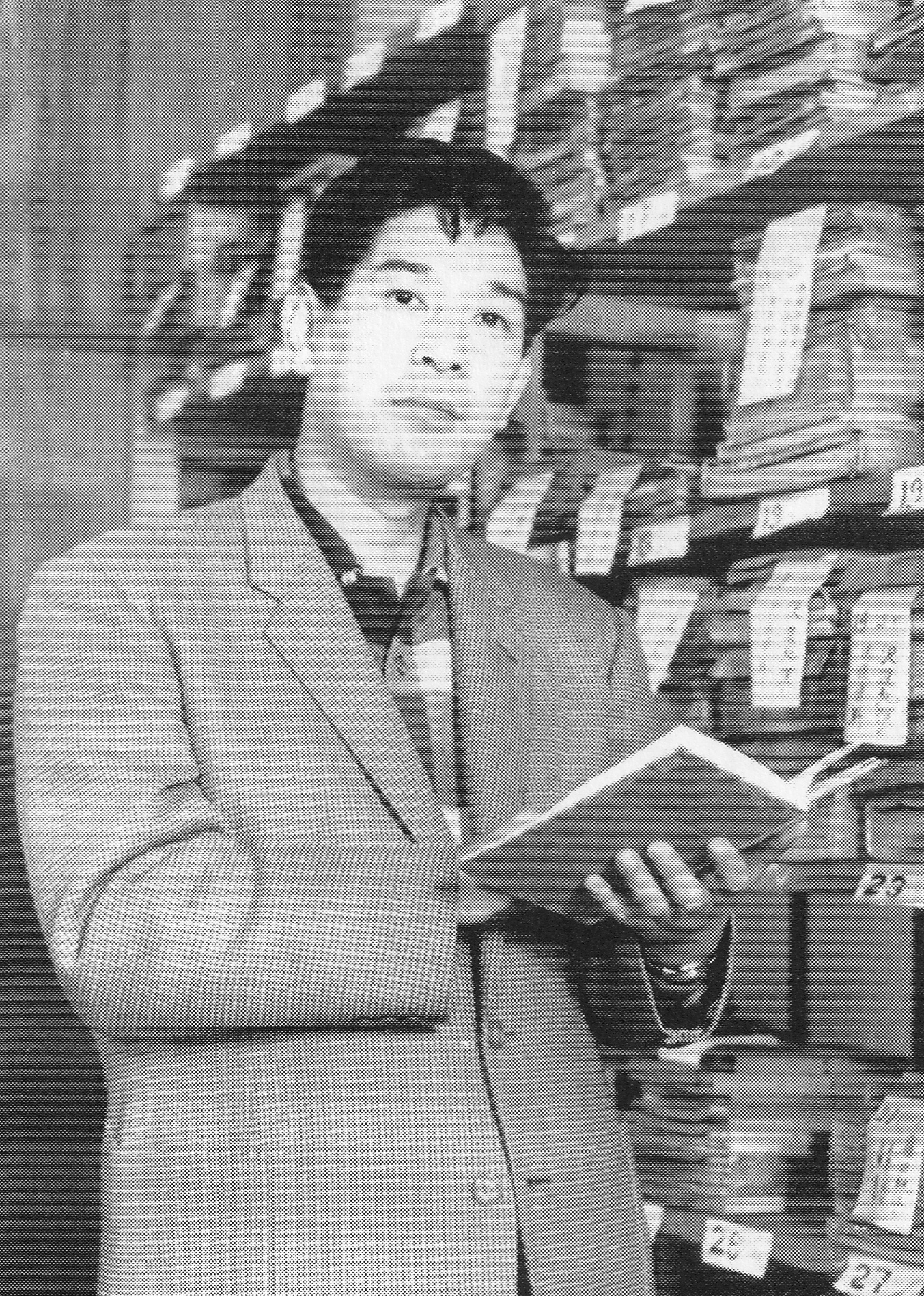
- Born: 15 September 1920; Osaka, Japan
- Died: 20 December 2007 (aged 87)
- Occupation: Film director
- Years active: 1959–2007
- Known for: Zatoichi series Nemuri Kyōshirō series

Tokuzō Tanaka (田中徳三, Tanaka Tokuzō; 15 September 1920 – 20 December 2007) was a Japanese film director. He is well known for directing several installments of the Zatoichi and Nemuri Kyōshirō film series.

== Biography ==
Tanaka graduated from Kwansei Gakuin University. In 1948, he joined the Daiei studio and started working as an assistant director under Kon Ichikawa, Kenji Mizoguchi and Kazuo Mori etc. In 1958, Tanaka was promoted to director and debuted with Bakeneko Goyōda. Tanaka received the Japan Directors Guild Special award for his Akumyō series films. In 1971, he was released from his contract with Daiei and become a freelance director when the studio shut down film production. As a freelance director he directed a lot of jidaigeki television dramas such as Hissatsu series.

His final work was in the 2007 short film Shonen Kawachiondotori Monogatari. In December 2007, he died of Intracranial hemorrhage.

== Selected filmography ==
Title	Release date	Notes
Rashomon 羅生門	1950	Assistant director
The Tales of the Wave after the Rain Moon 雨月物語	1953	Assistant director
Sansho the Bailiff 山椒大夫	1954	Assistant director
The Crucified Lovers 近松物語	1954	Assistant director
Bakeneko Goyōda 化け猫御用だ	1958	
Ukare Sandogasa 浮かれ三度笠	1959	
The Demon of Mount Oe 大江山酒天童子; Oe-yama Shutendōshi	1960	
Nuregami Botan 濡れ髪牡丹	1961	
Akumyō 悪名	1961	
Hanakurabe Tanuki Dōchu 花くらべ狸道中	1961	
Ken ni Kakeru 剣に賭ける	1962	
The Whale God 鯨神	1962	
Enter Kyōshirō Nemuri the Swordman 眠狂四郎殺法帖; Nemuri Kyōshirō Sappōjō	1963	
New Tale of Zatoichi 新・座頭市物語; Shin Zatōichi Monogatari	1963	
Shutō 手討	1963	
Zatoichi the Fugitive 座頭市兇状旅; Zatōichi Kyōjōtabi	1963	
Shinobi no Mono 4: Siege 忍びの者 霧隠才蔵; Shinobi no Mono Kirigakure Saizō	1963	
Yadonashi Inu 宿無し犬	1964	
Kojiki Taishō 乞食大将	1964	
Hoodlum Soldier and the C.O. 続・兵隊やくざ	1965	
Akai Shuriken 赤い手裏剣	1965	
The Betrayal 大殺陣 雄呂血; Daisatsujin Orochi	1966	Remake of the 1925 silent film Orochi
Zatoichi's Vengeance 座頭市の歌が聞える	1966	
Assignment Dragon No.3 陸軍中野学校 竜三号指令	1966	
Hoodlum Soldier on the Attack 兵隊やくざ殴り込み; Heitai Yakuza Nagurikomi	1967	
Heitai Yakuza Ore ni Makasero 兵隊やくざ 俺にまかせろ	1967	
The Night Flying ひき裂かれた盛装; Hikisakareta Shōsō	1967	
Sleepy Eyes of Death 10: Hell Is a Woman 眠狂四郎女地獄; Nemuri Kyōshirō Jorōjigoku	1967	
The Snow Woman 怪談雪女郎; Kaidan Yukijorō	1968	
Secrets of a Women's Temple 秘録おんな寺; Hiroku Onnadera	1969	
Tejō Muyō 手錠無用	1969	
Haunted Castle 秘録怪猫伝; Hiroku Kaibōden	1969	
Tobira wa Hirakareta 扉はひらかれた	1975	
Shōnen Kawachiond Monogatari 少年河内音頭取り物語	2007	

=== Television ===
- Ronin of the Wilderness (1972–74)
- Nemuri Kyōshirō (1972) (ep. 2, 4, 13, 14, 19 and 20)
- Hissatsu Shiokinin (1973) (ep. 20)
- Tasukenin Hashiru (1973–74) (ep. 18, 19, 23, 24, 28, 31 and 34)
- Kurayami Shitomenin (1974) (ep. 5, 6, 15 and 20)
- Kenkaku Shōbai (ep. 2, 4, 12 and 13)
- Amigasa Jūbei (1974–75) (ep. 1, 2, 16, 17 and 18)
- Nagasaki Hangachōu (1975) (ep. 9, 10 and 16)
- Hissatsu Shiokiya Kagyō (1975) (ep. 24)
- Zatoichi (1974–78) Season 1 Episode 6, 7, and 10 (1974) S2 Episode 9, 12 (1976) S4 Episode 20 (1979)
- Akō Rōshi (1979) (ep. 3, 4, 9, 10 and 11)
- Hissatsu Shigotonin (1979–81) (ep. 19, 21, 28, 42, 43, 47, 48, 52, 53, 58, 59, 66, 69, 70, 75, 77 and 80)
- Shin Hissatsu Shigotonin (1981–82) (ep. 3, 9, 10, 14, 15, 20, 29, 30, 35, 37, 43, 47, 52 and 53)
- Hissatsu Shigotonin III (1982–83) (ep. 1, 3, 6, 12, 16, 24, 25 and 32)
- Hissatsu Watashinin (1983) (ep. 1, 2 and 6)
- Hissatsu Shigotonin IV (1983–84) (ep. 1, 2, 4, 8, 9, 15, 21, 29, 32 and 38)
- Hissatsu Shikirinin (1984) (ep. 13 and 15)
- Hissatsu Shigotonin V (1985) (ep. 3, 6 and 11)
- Hissatsu Shigotonin V Gekitouhen (ep. 5)
- Hissatsu Shigotonin V Senpuhen (1986–87) (ep. 3, 6 and 9)
- Nemuri Kyōshirō (1989) (TV Movie)
- Abare Hasshū Goyō Tabi (1990–91) (Season 1 ep. 1, 3 and 6), (Season 2, ep. 10, 12, 22 and 23)
