= Adauchi sōzenji baba =

- Film poster
- Directed by: Masahiro Makino
- Screenplay by: Yoshikata Yoda
- Story by: Itarō Yamagami
- Starring: Ryūtarō Ōtomo; Masao Mishima; Akiko Kazami; Yūji Hori; Kanji Koshiba
- Cinematography: Takeo Itō
- Edited by: Shintarō Miyamoto
- Music by: Seiichi Suzuki
- Distributed by: Toei Company
- Release date: June 25, 1957 (Japan)
- Running time: 93 minutes
- Country: Japan
- Language: Japanese

Adauchi sōzenji baba (Japanese: 仇討崇禅寺馬場), also known as Temple of Revenge, is a 1957 black-and-white jidaigeki Japanese film directed by Masahiro Makino.

== Cast ==
- Ryūtarō Ōtomo
- Masao Mishima
- Akiko Kazami
- Yūji Hori
- Kanji Koshiba
