= Yoko Akino =

Japanese actress (born 1957)

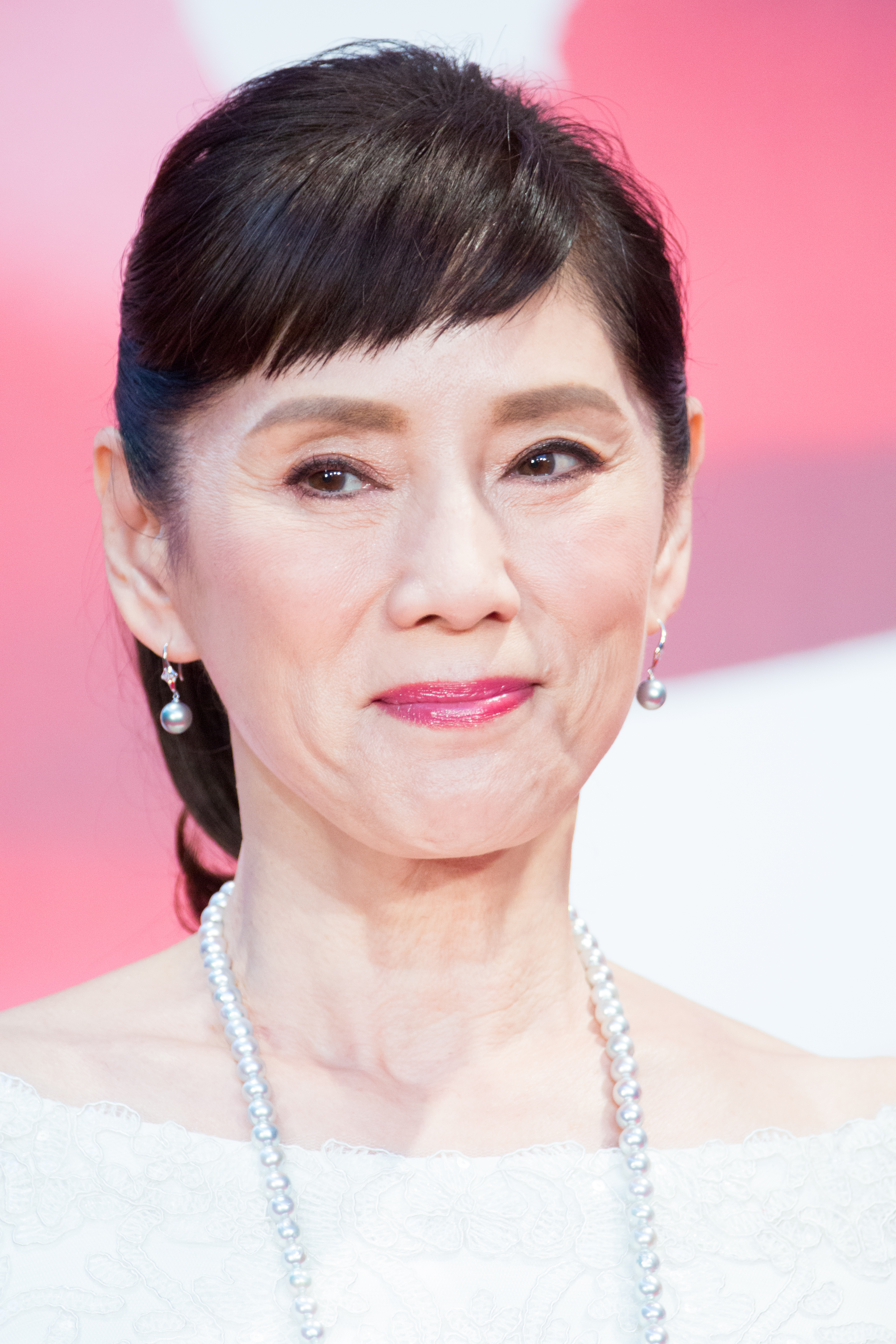
- Akino at opening ceremony of the Tokyo International Film Festival, 2017
- Born: Akino Yōko; 18 January 1957 (age 69)
- Occupation: Actress

Yōko Akino (秋野 暢子 Akino Yōko, born Yōko Tashiro, 田代 暢子 Tashiro Yōko, born 18 January 1957 in Osaka, Japan) is a Japanese actress.

== Selected filmography ==
=== Film ===
Year	Title	Role	Notes	Ref.
2001	Hush!	Yōko Kurita		
2014	The Snow White Murder Case	Miki's mother		
2017	Shashin Kōshien	Eiko		
2022	School Lunch of Ashiya City			
2024	A Day Begins			

=== Television ===
Year	Title	Role	Notes	Ref.
1975–76	Ohayōsan	Ayuko Tonomura	Lead role; Asadora	
1986	Hissatsu Masshigura!	Keima no Ogin		
2016	Daddy Sister	Matsu Morita	Asadora	
