= The Unfettered Mind =

Buddhist treatise by Takuan Sōhō

The Unfettered Mind is a book containing translations from Japanese by William Scott Wilson of three short texts by Takuan Sōhō (1573–1645), a notable monk of the Rinzai sect of Zen Buddhism. Addressed to samurai, the principles expounded in the texts are also applicable to anyone who desires an introduction to Zen philosophy—various kinds of situations are first described, and then commented upon. The book's contents apply Zen Buddhist understandings to martial arts.

== Contents ==
All three texts are addressed to the samurai class, and seek to unify the spirit of Zen with the spirit of the sword:

- "The Mysterious Record of Immovable Wisdom" (不動智神妙録 Fudōchi Shinmyōroku), a letter written to Yagyū Munenori, head of the Yagyū Shinkage-ryū school of swordsmanship and teacher to two generations of shōguns
- "The Clear Sound of Jewels" (玲瓏集 Reirōshū), an essay dealing with the fundamental nature of humans: how a swordsman, daimyō—or any person, for that matter—can know the difference between what is right and what is mere selfishness, and can understand the basic question of knowing when and how to die.
- "Annals of the Sword Taia" (太阿記 Taia Ki), a letter written perhaps to Munenori, or possibly to Ono Tadaaki, head of the Ittō school of swordsmanship and an official instructor to the shōgun's family and close retainers.

Broadly speaking, "The Mysterious Record of Immovable Wisdom" deals with technique: how the self is related to the Self during confrontation, and how an individual may become a unified whole, while "Annals of the Sword Taia" deals more with the psychological aspects of the relationship between the self and the other.

"The Mysterious Record of Immovable Wisdom" is divided into the following sections:

- The Affliction of Abiding in Ignorance
- The Immovable Wisdom of All Buddhas
- The Interval into Which Not Even a Hair Can Be Entered
- The Action of Spark and Stone
- Where One Puts the Mind
- The Right Mind and the Confused Mind
- The Mind of the Existent Mind and the Mind of No-Mind
- Throw the Gourd into the Water Push It Down and It Will Spin
- Engender the Mind with No Place to Abide (應無所住而生其心【おうむしょじゅうじじょうごしん】ōmusho jūji jōgoshin)
- Seek the Lost Mind
- Throw a Ball into a Swift Current and It Will Never Stop
- Sever The Edge Between Before and After
- Water Scorches Heaven, Fire Cleanses Clouds

== Citations ==
Takuan refers to many poems and sayings, including those of:

- Bukkoku Kokushi (1256–1316): A Buddhist priest
- Saigyō (1118–90): A Shingon priest of the late Heian period famous for his wanderings and highly admired as a poet
- Mencius (372–289 BC): A Chinese philosopher, the most famous Confucian after Confucius himself
- Jien (1155–1225): Also widely known by the name Jichin; a poet and monk of the Tendai sect
- Mugaku (1226–86): A Chinese priest of the Linchi (Rinzai) sect, invited to Japan by Hojo Tokimune in 1278
- Shao K'ang-chieh (1011–77): A scholar of the Northern Sung Dynasty
- Zhongfeng Mingben (1263–1323): A Chinese Zen priest of the Yuan Dynasty
- The Pi Yen Lu, a collection of Zen problems, sayings and stories of the patriarchs
- The Ise Monogatari, a work of the ninth century
- The Doctrine of the Mean
- The Golden Light Sutra
- Li Po (Li T'ai Po, 701–62): One of the great poets of T'ang period China
- Ippen Shonin (1239–89): Founder of the Jodo sect of Pure Land Buddhism
- Hotto Kokushi (1207–98): A monk of the Rinzai sect who traveled to Sung China in 1249
- The Namu Amida Butsu, "Homage to the Buddha Amitābha"
- Kogaku Osho (1465–1548): An Arinzai monk who taught Zen to the Emperor Go-Nara
- The Fan-i Ming-i Chi, a Sung Dynasty Sanskrit-Chinese dictionary
- Bodhidharma: The first patriarch of Ch'an (Zen) Buddhism in China; he is said to have arrived in that country from India in either A.D. 470 or 520
- Ta Chien (637–713): Commonly known as Hui Neng; a pivotal figure in the development of Zen
- Daio Kokushi (1234–1308): A monk of the Rinzai sect who studied Buddhism in China
- Daito Kokushi (1282–1337): A follower of Daio Kokushi regarded to be the founder of Zen at Daitokuji
- Nai Chi Hsu T'ang (1185–1269): Also known as Hsu T'ang Chih Yu; a Chinese monk of Linchi Buddhism
- The Cheng Tao Ko, an early treatise on Zen
