= Shogun Iemitsu Shinobi Tabi =

Japanese television series

Shogun Iemitsu's Secret Journey (将軍家光忍び旅, Shōgun Iemitsu Shinobi Tabi) was a pair of television jidaigeki series on TV Asahi in Japan. The first aired in 1990–1991 and the sequel in 1992–1993. Kunihiko Mitamura portrayed Tokugawa Iemitsu in both series.

The show premiered on October 13, 1990, as an off-season replacement for the popular Abarenbo Shogun. It shared several cast members with Abarenbo Shogun, including Reiko Takashima, Ayako Tanaka and some minor guest actors. The final episode aired on March 30, 1991. The sequel ran during the same months of 1992–1993.

== Story ==
In 1634, the third Tokugawa shogun Iemitsu visited Kyoto in a lavish procession, accompanied by more than 300,000 followers. The premise of the television series is that he refused to ride in the palanquin. Instead, he walked in disguise as Tokuyama Takenoshin, a ronin. Accompanying him were Yagyū Jūbei, Isshin Tasuke, a pickpocket named Otsuta, and male and female ninja. Riding in the palanquin was a kagemusha, an actor named Shinkichi. His entourage included Ōkubo Hikozaemon, Lady Kasuga, Matsudaira Nobutsuna, and various ladies-in-waiting. Going to Kyoto, the entourage followed the Tōkaidō. At various places along the way, a (fictional) half-brother of Iemitsu, Tsuzuki, attempted to assassinate him, with the assistance of Fūma ninja.

The sequel, Shogun Iemitsu Shinobi Tabi Part II, depicts the return to Edo. This time the group travels along the Nakasendō, passing through territory that had recently been held by the Sanada clan. Takenoshin rescues a princess (Shizu, in disguise under the name Isuzu), who, viewers later learn, is a daughter of Ishida Mitsunari in league with Mugensai, formerly the chief ninja of the late Ishida Mitsunari. Mugensai has lied to the princess in order to get her to assassinate Iemitsu.

== Cast ==
- Kunihiko Mitamura as Tokugawa Iemitsu disguised as Tokuyama Takenoshin
- Korokke as Shinkichi
- Hisako Manda as Otsuta
- Toyokazu Minami as Isshin Tasuke
- Hiroshi Katsuno as Yagyū Jūbei
- Shigeru Kōyama as Ōkubo Hikozaemon
- Ryō Tamura as Matsudaira Izu no Kami Nobutsuna (original series)
- Reiko Takashima as Kaede, a lady-in-waiting (original series); Makiko Yamada (Part II)
- Ayako Tanaka as Aya, a lady-in-waiting
- Ken Nishida as Mugensai (Part II)
- Yoshimi Ashikawa as Princess Shizu, disguised as Lady Isuzu (Part II)
- Yuki Yukie as Kikue, her attendant
- Kyōko Tsujisawa as Okaru, lead actress of the traveling company
