= Minamoto no Yoshitsune (TV series) =

- Genre: Taiga drama
- Written by: Genzō Murakami
- Directed by: Naoya Yoshida etc
- Starring: Onoe Kikunosuke VII; Ken Ogata; Junko Fuji; Takashi Yamaguchi; Mayumi Ogawa; Masakazu Tamura; Ryūtarō Ōtomo; Osamu Takizawa; Isuzu Yamada
- Theme music composer: Toru Takemitsu
- Opening theme: NHK Symphony Orchestra
- Country of origin: Japan
- Original language: Japanese
- No. of episodes: 52

Production
- Running time: 45 minutes

Original release
- Network: NHK
- Release: January 2 – December 25, 1966

Related
- Yoshitsune (TV series)

Minamoto no Yoshitsune (源義経) is a 1966 Japanese television series. It is the 4th NHK taiga drama.

First viewing rating: 32.5%. Highest audience rating: 32.5%. Average audience rating: 23.5%.

Although only episodes 1, 33, and 52 still exist, it is the most surviving footage of the 1960s Taiga dramas.

== Story ==
The drama deals with the Genpei War during late Heian period. Based on Genzō Murakami's novels "Minamoto no Yoshitsune".

The story chronicles the life of Minamoto no Yoshitsune.

== Production ==
- Kunishirō Hayashi - Sword fight arranger

== Cast ==
=== Yoshitsune and people around him ===
- Onoe Kikunosuke VII as Minamoto no Yoshitsune
- Ken Ogata as Benkei
- Junko Fuji as Shizuka Gozen
- Isuzu Yamada as Tokiwa Gozen
- Hiroshi Akutagawa as Minamoto no Yoritomo
- Michiko Otsuka as Hojo Masako
- Kazuo Kitamura as Ōe no Hiromoto
- Jun Tazaki as Tosano bo Soshun
- Shin Kishida as Onuki Jiro
- Isao Hashizume

=== Taira clan ===
- Ryutaro Tashumi as Taira no Kiyomori
- Chiyonosuke Azuma as Taira no Munemori
- Kazuo Funaki as Taira no Atsumori
- Takashi Yamaguchi as Taira no Noritsune
- Shōbun Inoue as Taira no Moritsugu
- Takeshi Katō as Taira no Kagekiyo
- Chikao Ohtsuka as Fujiwara no Tadakiyo

=== Fujiwara clan ===
- Osamu Takizawa as Fujiwara no Hidehira
- Mayumi Ogawa as Shinobu
- Masakazu Tamura as Fujiwara no Tadahira
- Masao Shimizu as Fujiwara no Motonari
- Daisuke Katō as Kaneuri Kichiji
- Misako Watanabe as Akane

=== Others ===
- Bandō Mitsugorō IX as Takashina no Yasutsune
- Fumio Watanabe as Inoie Hachiro
- Machiko Washio as Ku
- Kenji Utsumi as Toraus
- Jūkei Fujioka as Adachi Saburō Kiyotsune
- Ryūtarō Ōtomo as Togashi Yasuie
- Shūichirō Moriyama as Aiko Sanjuro
