= Musashi (novel) =

1935–39 novel by Eiji Yoshikawa

- US edition cover
- Author: Eiji Yoshikawa
- Original title: 宮本武蔵
- Translator: Charles S. Terry
- Cover artist: Noriyoshi Ohrai
- Language: Japanese
- Genre: Epic, historical novel, martial arts
- Publisher: Asahi Shimbun
- Publication date: 1935
- Publication place: Japan
- English publication date: 1981
- Media type: Print (newspaper serial)
- Pages: 984 (US hardback edition)
- ISBN: 4-7700-1957-2 (US hardback edition)
- OCLC: 32830390

Musashi (Japanese: 宮本武蔵, Hepburn: Miyamoto Musashi), also listed as Musashi: An Epic Novel of the Samurai Era, is a Japanese epic novel written by Eiji Yoshikawa, about the life and deeds of legendary Japanese swordsman Miyamoto Musashi.

The book follows Shinmen Takezō shortly after the Battle of Sekigahara. A narrative starts when the monk Takuan forces the aimless warrior to reinvent himself as Miyamoto Musashi. He wanders around Japan training young pupils, getting involved in feuds with samurai and martial arts schools, and finding his way through his romantic life.

It was originally released as a serial in the Japanese newspaper Asahi Shimbun, between 1935 and 1939. It has been re-released in book format (first fully-compiled publication by Fumiko Yoshikawa in 1971), most of which are collections of several volumes, which compile the many newspaper strips. With an estimated 120 million copies sold, it is one of the best-selling book series in history.

An English translation was done by Charles S. Terry and features a foreword by Edwin O. Reischauer. It was first published in 1981 by Kodansha International Ltd., and Kodansha America, Inc.. Publication was assisted by a grant from the Japan Foundation. It was distributed in the United States by Kodansha America, Inc., and in the United Kingdom and continental Europe by Kodansha Europe Ltd..

== Introduction ==
It is a fictionalized account of the life of Miyamoto Musashi, author of The Book of Five Rings and arguably the most renowned Japanese swordsman who ever lived.

The novel has been translated into English by Charles S. Terry, with a foreword by Edwin O. Reischauer, published by Kodansha International.

The long epic (over 900 pages, abridged, in the English version) comprises seven "books" detailing the exploits of Miyamoto Musashi, beginning just after the battle of Sekigahara, following his journeys and the many people who become important in his life, and leading up to his climactic duel with Sasaki Kojiro on Ganryujima (Ganryu or Funa Island). Kojiro's cruelty contrasts with Musashi's reflective and selfless nature. Musashi becomes famous during the course of the novel as he searches for both perfection in swordsmanship and in consciousness. Innovating Japanese swordsmanship, he invents the style of simultaneously wielding both the katana and the wakizashi, something unheard of at that time in Japanese history. Chance, as well as the characters' very different life decisions, give to the book a philosophical dimension that is revealed in its ending.

== Release details ==
- Yoshikawa, Eiji (1935), Musashi (newspaper serial), Japan: Asahi Shimbun.
- ——— (July 1981), Musashi (hardcover), Trans. Charles S. Terry, United States: HarperCollins, ISBN 978-0-06-859851-0
- ——— (1993) [1981], Musashi (paperback), Trans. Charles S. Terry, Tokyo: Kodansha.
- ——— (May 1995), Musashi (hardcover), Trans. Charles S. Terry, Japan: Kodansha, ISBN 978-4-7700-1957-8.
- ——— (April 2026), Musashi - The Novel, books one to three (paperback), Trans. Alexander Bennett, UK: Tuttle, ISBN 978-4-8053-1841-6.

== See also ==
- Samurai Trilogy — film adaptation of the novel
- Vagabond — manga adaptation of the novel
