= Vonnegut (crater) =

Crater on Mercury

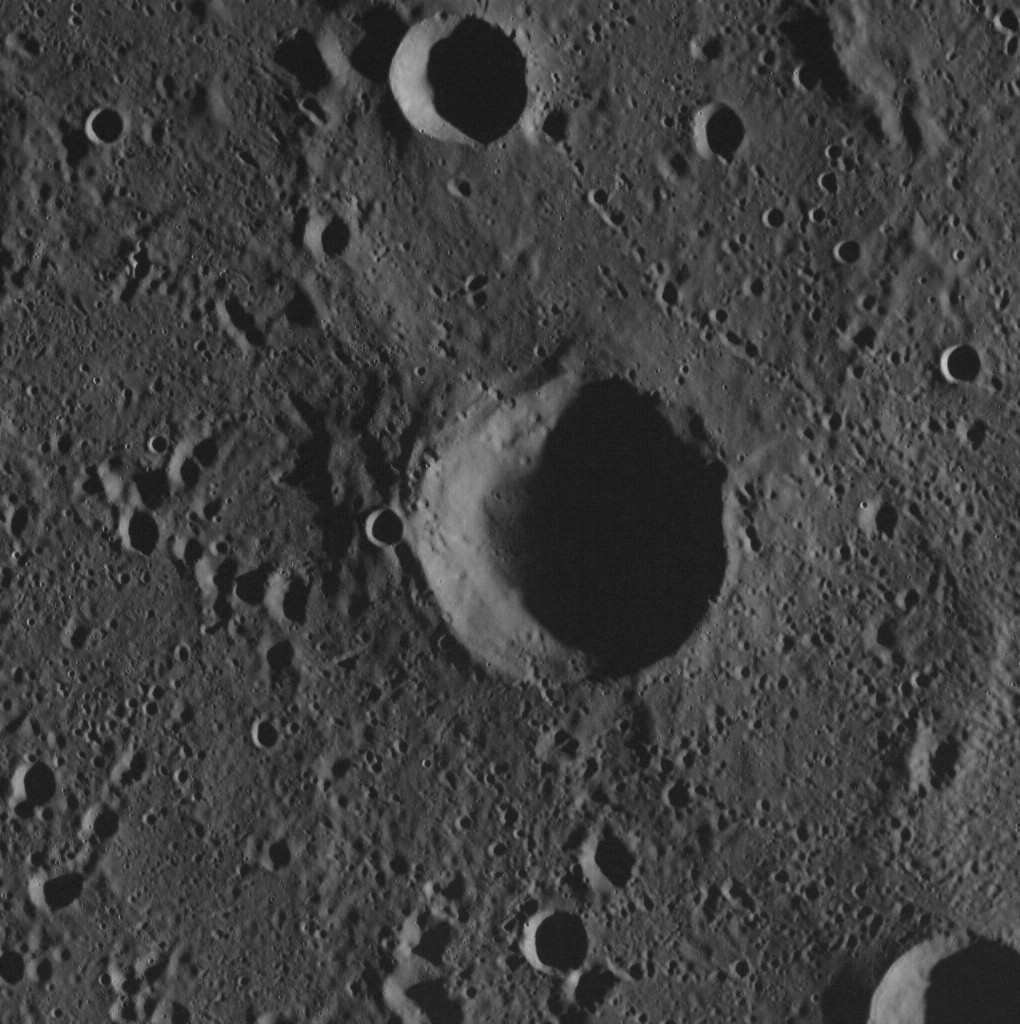
- MESSENGER image
- Planet: Mercury
- Coordinates: 82.72°N 249.91°W
- Quadrangle: Borealis
- Diameter: 26.61 km (16.53 mi)
- Eponym: Kurt Vonnegut

Vonnegut is a crater on Mercury, near the north pole. It was named by the IAU in 2017 after the American author Kurt Vonnegut. Part of Vonnegut's 1959 novel The Sirens of Titan takes place on Mercury. The crater was referred to as e5 in scientific literature prior to naming.

S band radar data from the Arecibo Observatory collected between 1999 and 2005 indicates a radar-bright area along the southern interior of Vonnegut, which is probably indicative of a water ice deposit, and lies within the permanently shadowed part of the crater. MESSENGER's Mercury Laser Altimeter (MLA) was used to measure surface reflectance of the surface of the planet, and the radar-bright material is covered by low-reflectance material.

Vonnegut is north of the slightly larger Yoshikawa crater.
