= Hissatsu Masshigura! =

Japanese TV drama series

- Also known as: 必殺まっしぐら!
- Genre: Jidaigeki
- Directed by: Eiichi Kudo; Youichi Harada
- Starring: Kunihiko Mitamura; Yoko Akino; Shōfukutei Tsurube II
- Theme music composer: Masaaki Hirao
- Country of origin: Japan
- Original language: Japanese
- No. of episodes: 12

Production
- Producers: Hisashi Yamauchi; Yozō Sakurai
- Running time: 45 minutes (per episode)
- Production companies: Asahi, Shochiku

Original release
- Network: TV Asahi
- Release: August 8 – October 31, 1986

Hissatsu Masshigura! (必殺まっしぐら!) is a Japanese television jidaigeki or period drama that was broadcast in 1986. It is the 26th in the Hissatsu series. Inspired by Video game Super Mario Bros.

== Cast ==
- Kunihiko Mitamura as Hide
- Yoko Akino as Keima no Ogin
- Shōfukutei Tsurube II as Ayamaro
- Teruhiko Saigō as Toukichi
- Mikio Osawa as Sabu
- Masako Sugawara as Wakamurasaki
- Gorō Mutsumi as Kagurazaka Soemon
- Jūkei Fujioka as Mukojima Jinjurō
