= Etsushi Takahashi =

Japanese actor and seiyū (1935–1996)

- Born: 2 August 1935; Kishiwada, Osaka, Osaka Prefecture, Japan
- Died: 19 May 1996 (aged 60)
- Occupation: Actor
- Years active: 1960–1995

Etsushi Takahashi (高橋 悦史, Takahashi Etsushi; 2 August 1935 – 19 May 1996) was a Japanese actor from Kishiwada, Osaka Prefecture. Takahashi often worked with Kihachi Okamoto and Satsuo Yamamoto.

After graduating from Rikkyo University, Takahashi joined NHK acting school. In 1964, he joined Bungakuza Theatre Company's acting school and became an official member in 1967. In the same year, he gave his film debut with Watashi Machigatterukashira?. He received the Elan d'or Award for Newcomer of the Year in 1968.

He appeared in Onihei's Detective Records, although he was fighting against cancer, and the film became his final film appearance.

== Selected filmography ==
=== Film ===
- Watashi Machigatterukashira? (1966), Koike
- Japan's Longest Day (1967), Masataka Ida
- The Human Bullet (1967)
- The Affair (1967)
- Kill! (1968), Hanji
- One Day at Summer's End (1968), tetsuya
- Red Lion (1969), Ichinose
- Eros + Massacre (1970), Jun Tsuji
- Men and War (1979), Godai
- Battle of Okinawa (1971), Yokichi Kaya
- Zatoichi at Large (1972), Denjuro Sagara
- Tabi no Omosa (1972), Daizo Kimura
- Hanzo the Razor: Who's Got the Gold? (1974)
- Kinkanshoku (1975), Jotaro Furugaki
- Fumō Chitai (1976)
- Shogun's Samurai (1978), Izu-no-kami Matsudaira Nobutsuna
- Der Kaiser ist Nicht am August (1978)
- Blue Christmas (1979), Sawaki
- Nihon no Fixer (1979), Masaki Kaga
- Shosetsu Yoshida Gakko (1983), Hayato Ikeda
- Return from the River Kwai (1989), Ozawa
- The River with No Bridge (1992), Iseda
- East Meets West (1995), Kimura Settsu no Kami
- Onihei's Detective Records (1995), Sashima Tadasuke

=== Television dramas ===
- Ten to Chi to (1969), Usami Sadakatsu
- Haru no Sakamichi (1971), Kuroda Nagamasa
- Key Hunter (1972) (ep.221), Himuro
- Shinsho Taikōki (1973), Oda Nobunaga
- G-Men '75 (1975, ep.15), (1976 ep.44) (1977, ep,115)
- Daitokai Tatakai no Hibi (1976) (ep.17), Maejima
- The Yagyu Conspiracy (1978), Izu-no-kami Matsudaira Nobutsuna
- Hissatsu Shimainin (1981), Shinmatsu
- The Unfettered Shogun (1981) (ep.144), Saigu Keisai
- Oshin (1983), Tanokura Hitoshi
- Taiyō ni Hoero! (1984) (ep.610)
- Hissatsu Shikirinin (1984), Toranosuke
- Sanbiki ga Kiru! (1987) (ep.3), Hirata Kanbei
- Asami Mitsuhiko Series (1987–90)
- Onihei Hankachō (1989–95), Sashima Tadasuke
- Kasaga no Tsubone (1989), Sanada Yukimura
- Taiheiki (1991), Momonoi Tadatsune
