= Akumyō =

- Directed by: Tokuzō Tanaka
- Written by: Yoshikata Yoda
- Starring: Shintarō Katsu; Jirō Tamiya; Tamao Nakamura
- Cinematography: Kazuo Miyagawa
- Music by: Akira Ifukube
- Production company: Daiei
- Distributed by: Daiei
- Release date: September 30, 1961
- Running time: 94
- Country: Japan
- Language: Japanese

The Akumyō (悪名; "bad name") series consists of seventeen yakuza films based on the novel by Tōkō Kon. starring Shintarō Katsu and Jirō Tamiya, produced between 1960 and 1974.

== Films ==
=== Shintaro Katsu series ===
- Tough Guy (悪名, Akumyō) (1961) directed by Tokuzō Tanaka
- Zoku Akumyō (続悪名) (1961) directed by Tokuzō Tanaka
- Shin Akumyō (新悪名) (1962) directed by Kazuo Mori
- Zoku Shin Akumyō (続新悪名) (1962) directed by Tokuzō Tanaka
- Daisan no Akumyō (第三の悪名) (1963) directed by Tokuzō Tanaka
- Akumyō Ichiba (悪名市場) (1963) directed by Kazuo Mori
- Akumyō Hatoba (悪名波止場) (1963) directed by Kazuo Mori
- Akumyō Ichiban (悪名一番) (1963) directed by Tokuzō Tanaka
- Akumyō Daiko (悪名太鼓) (1964) directed by Kazuo Mori
- Akumyō Nobori (悪名幟) (1965) directed by Tokuzō Tanaka
- Akumyō Muteki (悪名無敵) (1965) directed by Tokuzō Tanaka
- Akumyō Zakura (悪名桜) (1966) directed by Tokuzō Tanaka
- Akumyō Ichidai (悪名一代) (1967) directed by Kimiyoshi Yasuda
- Akumyō Juhachi-ban (悪名十八番) (1968) directed by Kazuo Mori
- Akumyō Ichiban Shobu (悪名一番勝負) (1969) directed by Masahiro Makino
- Akumyō: Shima Arashiaka (悪名縄張（しま）荒らし) (1974) directed by Yasuzo Masumura

=== Koji Matoba series ===
- Akumyō (悪名) (2001)
- Akumyō 2: Araburu Kenkadamashī (悪名2 荒ぶる喧嘩魂) (2001)
