= Sanada Taiheiki =

Sanada Taiheiki may refer to:

- Sanada Taiheiki (novel), a novel by Shōtarō Ikenami
- Sanada Taiheiki (TV series), a Japanese TV series, based on the novel
