= Orochimaru =

Fictional ninja

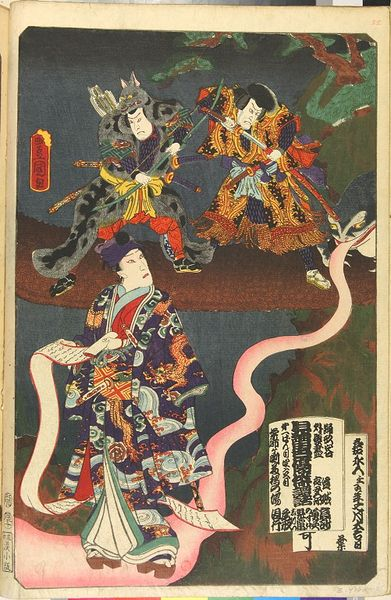

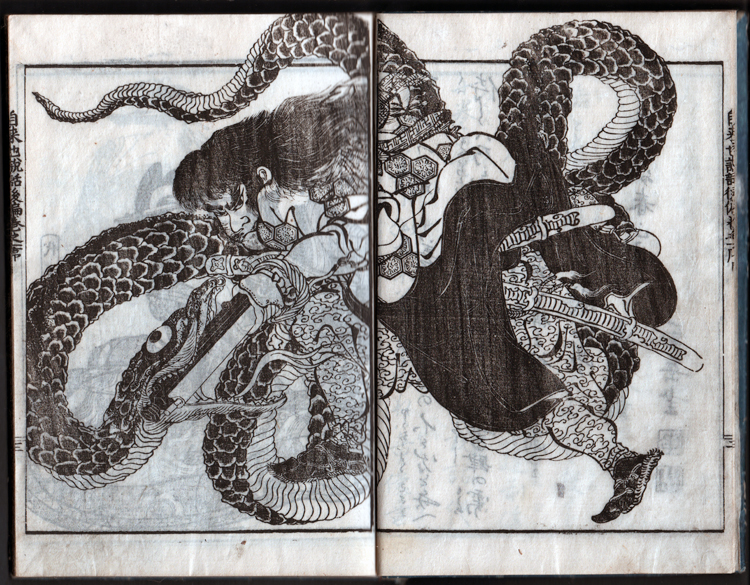

Orochimaru (大蛇丸), featured in the Japanese folktale Jiraiya Gōketsu Monogatari (The Tale of the Gallant Jiraiya), is the archenemy of the ninja Jiraiya. He was once named Yashagorō (夜叉五郎) and was one of Jiraiya's followers but was overtaken by serpent magic. Having changed his name to Orochimaru, he gained the ability to turn himself into a giant serpent. He poisoned Jiraiya and Tsunade the slug princess by pouring his venom on them as they slept, only for another follower to save the couple's lives afterwards. "The story, first recorded in 1806, was adapted into a mid-19th-century serialized novel (43 installments, 1839–1868) and a kabuki drama, based on the first 10 installments, by Kawatake Mokuami, in 1852. In the 20th-century, the story was adapted in several films, in video games, and in a manga."

Orochi means "big snake" or "serpent".

== Popular culture ==
The manga and anime franchise Naruto features the characters Jiraiya, Orochimaru and Tsunade, where Orochimaru is portrayed to be the legendary ninja with the power of the snakes..

In the 2013 video game Muramasa Rebirth, one of the alternate endings has the Iga ninja Arashimaru getting possessed by his final opponent's spirit and taking on the name "Orochimaru". In a desperate act of defiance, Arashimaru's ally Shirohebi has the ninja's former master Shiranui spirit away a rival clan's last surviving heir during Orochimaru's attack who, when grown, takes on the name "Jiraiya" to fight Orochimaru.

== See also ==
- Susanoo
- Yamata no Orochi
