= Taiko (novel) =

Epic novel by Eiji Yoshikawa

Taiko: An Epic Novel of War and Glory in Feudal Japan
- US edition cover
- Author: Eiji Yoshikawa
- Original title: 新書太閤記
- Translator: William Scott Wilson
- Cover artist: Noriyoshi Ohrai
- Language: Japanese
- Subject: Toyotomi Hideyoshi
- Genre: Epic; historical novel; war fiction
- Published: 1937
- Publisher: Yomiuri Shimbun
- Publication place: Japan
- English publication date: September 23, 1992
- Media type: Print (newspaper serial)
- Pages: 926 (US edition)
- ISBN: 9784770015709 (US edition)
- OCLC: 471053215

Taiko (Japanese: 新書太閤記, Hepburn: Shinsho Taikōki), also known as Taiko: An Epic Novel of War and Glory in Feudal Japan, is a Japanese epic novel written by Eiji Yoshikawa about the life and rise to power of Toyotomi Hideyoshi during the Sengoku and Azuchi-Momoyama periods of Feudal Japan.

The book is a semi-biographical work depicted through the style of an epic fiction novel, and follows Hideyoshi from his childhood to his death. Taiko consists of eleven newspaper serials originally published in the Japanese newspaper Yomiuri Shimbun throughout the late 1930s. In 1967, the volumes were compiled by Yoshikawa's wife, Fumiko (née Ikedo) and published under the name Shinsho Taikōki.

In 1992, Shinsho Taikōki was translated and abridged into English with consent from the author's estate by William Scott Wilson. It was released in the United States, the United Kingdom and continental Europe as Taiko: An Epic Novel of War and Glory in Feudal Japan by Kodansha International. The localized name, Taiko, is a reference to the Japanese word Taikō (太閤), the title of a retired Kampaku (関白, Imperial Regent) which is commonly used as an endonym for Hideyoshi.

== Reception ==
Rosemary Edghill of the Historical Novel Society pointed out Taiko's epic length, noting "even in this abridgement, the book is over 900 pages of very small type, and the book seems at times to consist of little more than the iteration of an endless series of nearly-identical battles, whose stakes and outcome are opaque to the reader." Edghill praised Taiko for its interesting story, yet criticized the "extremely literal translation [by Wilson] that makes no concession to readers unfamiliar with medieval Japanese culture."

Taiko received a spike in popularity following both the 1975 release of Shōgun by James Clavell and again in 2024 with the TV series adaptation of Clavell's novel. The Washington Post, in reviewing Taiko, mentioned how it serves to "fill in some historical gaps in Clavell's bestseller", yet described Yoshikawa as "obsessed with battles" and added that Wilson's translation "could easily have lopped off a couple hundred pages".

In the August 1992 issue of Kirkus Reviews, the magazine also compares Taiko to Clavell's novel, mentioning how Yoshikawa's work features "no helpful western interpreters, only a couple of references to missionaries and the Portuguese". Similar to other contemporary reviews, the magazine described Taiko as "episodic, bloody, prim, and quite long", but pointing out that "determined readers will find—buried under the hundreds of decapitated warriors— the roots of the present Japanese international business success, and the country's attitudes towards women, unions, etiquette, and suicide".

== Adaptations ==
=== Television ===
In 1965, NHK produced Taikōki (太閤記), a Taiga drama based on Yoshikawa's original serials, starring Ken Ogata as Toyotomi Hideyoshi and Kōji Takahashi as Oda Nobunaga.

In 1973, NET adapted Shinsho Taikōki into a jidaigeki series sharing the same title, starring Takashi Yamaguchi as Hideyoshi and Etsushi Takahashi as Nobunaga.
