= Eiji Yoshikawa =

Japanese historical novelist (1892–1962)

Eiji Yoshikawa 吉川 英治 OOC
- 吉川 英治
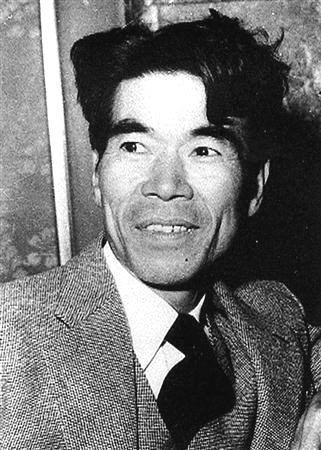
- Born: Hidetsugu Yoshikawa; August 11, 1892; Kanagawa Prefecture, Japan
- Died: September 7, 1962 (aged 70); Tokyo, Japan
- Citizenship: Japanese
- Occupation: Novelist
- Spouses: Yasu Akazawa (m. 1923) Fumiko Ikedo (m. 1937)
- Writing career
- Genre: Historical drama
- Subject: Japanese history
- Notable works: Musashi; Taiko

Eiji Yoshikawa (吉川 英治, Yoshikawa Eiji; Japanese pronunciation: [jo.ɕi̥.kaꜜ.wa | eꜜi.(d)ʑi, -ka.wa eꜜi-, -eꜜː.(d)ʑi], August 11, 1892 – September 7, 1962) was a Japanese historical novelist, best known for his revisions of classics and retelling of historical events through the lens of semi-biographical fiction books.

He was mainly influenced by classics such as The Tale of the Heike, Tale of Genji, Water Margin and Romance of the Three Kingdoms, many of which he retold in his own style. As an example, Yoshikawa took up Taiko's original manuscript in 15 volumes to retell it in a more accessible tone and reduce it to only two volumes.

His other books also serve similar purposes and, although most of his novels are not original works, he created a huge amount of work and a renewed interest in the past. He was awarded the Cultural Order of Merit in 1960 (the highest award for a man of letters in Japan), the Order of the Sacred Treasure and the Mainichi Art Award just before his death from lung cancer in 1962.

== Early life ==
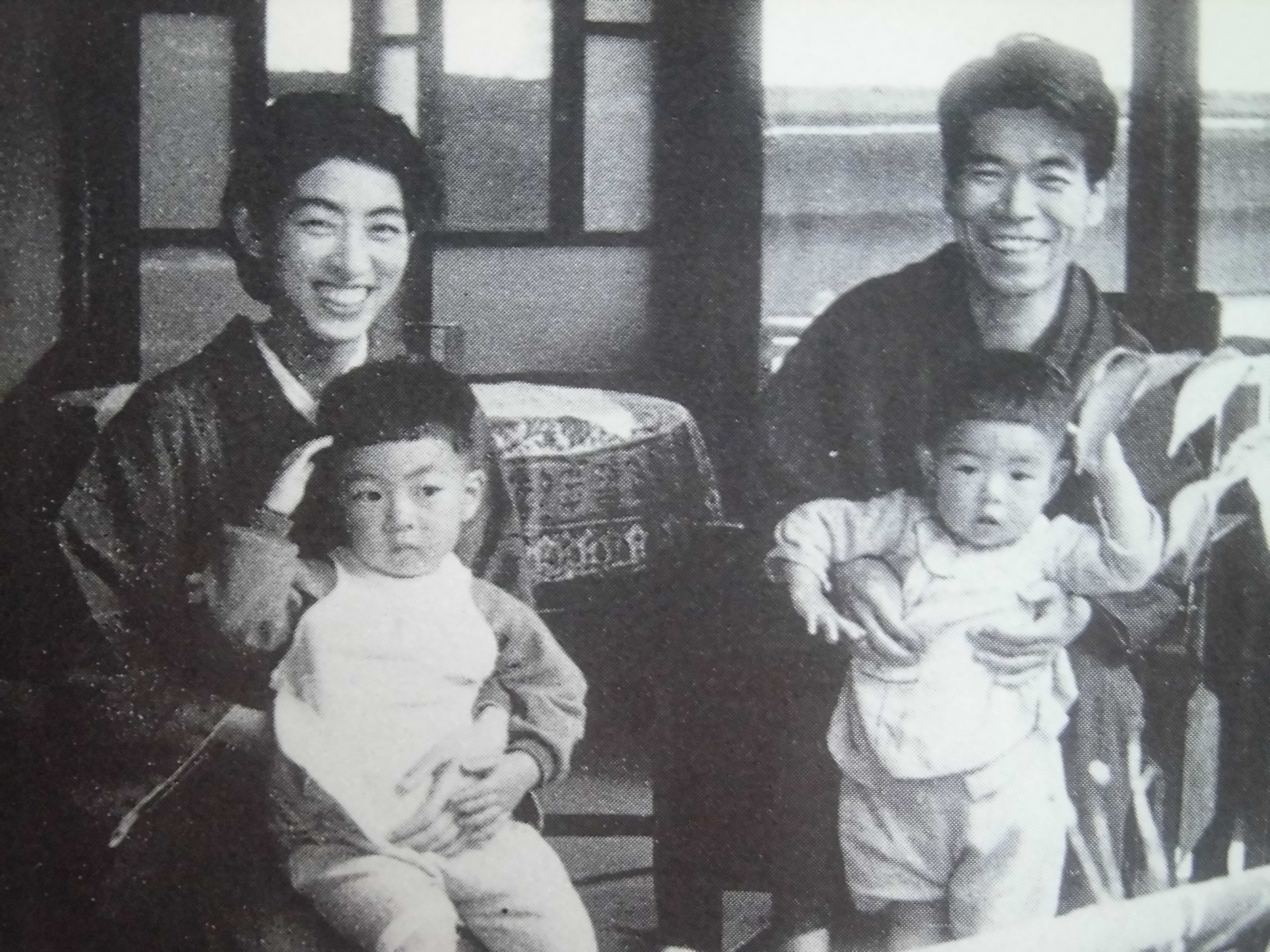
Yoshikawa family. Fumiko Ikedo holds her first son Hideaki and Eiji Yoshikawa holds his second son Hideho.

He was born Hidetsugu Yoshikawa (吉川英次, Yoshikawa Hidetsugu) in Kanagawa Prefecture, in what is now a part of Yokohama. Because of his father's failed business, he had to drop out of primary school to work. When he was 18, after a near-fatal accident working at the Yokohama docks, he moved to Tokyo and became an apprentice in a gold lacquer workshop. Around this time, he became interested in comic haiku. He joined a poetry society and started writing comic haiku under the pseudonym "Kijiro".

In 1914, with The Tale of Enoshima, he won first prize in a novel-writing contest sponsored by the publisher Kodansha. He joined the newspaper Maiyu Shimbun in 1921, and in the following year he began publishing serializations, starting with Life of Shinran.

He married Yasu Akazawa in 1923, the year of the Great Kantō earthquake. His experiences in the earthquake strengthened his resolve to make writing his career. In the following years he published stories in various periodicals published by Kodansha, who recognized him as their number one author. He used 19 pen names before settling on Eiji Yoshikawa. He first used this pen name with the serialization of Sword Trouble, Woman Trouble. His name became a household word after Secret Record of Naruto was serialized in the Osaka Mainichi Shimbun; from then on his writing became much more popular.

In the early 1930s, his writing became introspective, reflecting growing troubles in his personal life. But in 1935, with the serialization of Musashi, about famed swordsman Miyamoto Musashi, in the Asahi Shimbun, his writing settled firmly into the genre of historical adventure fiction.

Upon the outbreak of war with China in 1937 the Asahi Shimbun sent him into the field as a special correspondent. At this time he divorced Yasu Akazawa and married Fumiko Ikedo. In 1938, Yoshikawa joined the Pen butai (lit. "Pen corps"), a government organisation which consisted of authors who travelled the front during the Second Sino-Japanese War to write favourably of Japan's war efforts in China. During the war he continued writing novels, and became more influenced by Chinese culture. Among the works of this period are Taiko and his re-telling of the Romance of the Three Kingdoms.

At the end of the war he stopped writing for a while and settled down to enjoy a quiet retirement in Yoshino (present-day Oumeshi) on the outskirts of Tokyo, but by 1947 he had started writing again. His post-war works include New Tale of the Heike, published in the Asahi Weekly (1950), and A Private Record of the Pacific War (1958).

On September 7, 1962, he died from cancer-related complications.

== English translations ==
Four of his books have been translated into English. They are:

=== Miyamoto Musashi, translated as Musashi ===
Translated by Charles S. Terry

- (1981) Musashi. New York: HarperCollins. ISBN 978-0-06-859851-0 (cloth)
- (1989) Musashi Book I: The Way of the Samurai. New York: Pocket Books. ISBN 0-671-73483-0 (paper)
- (1989) Musashi Book II: The Art of War. New York: Pocket Books ISBN 978-0671677206 (paper)
- (1989) Musashi Book III: The Way of the Sword. New York: Pocket Books. ISBN 0-671-67721-7 (paper)
- (1989) Musashi Book IV: The Bushido Code. New York: Pocket Books. ISBN 0-671-72991-8 (paper)
- (1989) Musashi Book V: The Way of Life and Death. New York: Pocket Books. ISBN 0-671-67723-3 (paper)
- (1995) Musashi. Tokyo: Kodansha International. ISBN 978-4-7700-1957-8 (cloth)

=== Shinsho Taikōki, translated as Taiko: An Epic Novel of War and Glory in Feudal Japan ===
Translated by William Scott Wilson

- (1992) Taiko: An Epic Novel of War and Glory in Feudal Japan. Tokyo: Kodansha. ISBN 978-4-7700-1570-9 (cloth)
- (2000) Taiko: An Epic Novel of War and Glory in Feudal Japan. Tokyo: Kodansha. ISBN 978-4-7700-2609-5 (cloth)

=== Shin Heike monogatari, translated as The Heike Story: A Modern Translation of the Classic Tale of Love and War ===
Translated by Fuki Wooyenaka Uramatsu

- (1956) The Heike Story: A Modern Translation of the Classic Tale of Love and War. New York: Alfred A. Knopf. ASIN B0007BR0W8 (cloth)
- (1981) The Heike Story: A Modern Translation of the Classic Tale of Love and War. Tokyo: Tuttle Publishing. ISBN 978-0-8048-1376-1 (paper)
- (2002) The Heike Story: A Modern Translation of the Classic Tale of Love and War. Tokyo: Tuttle Publishing. ISBN 978-0-8048-3318-9 (paper)

=== Wasurenokori no ki, translated as Fragments of a Past: A Memoir ===
Translated by Edwin McClellan

- Fragments of a Past: A Memoir (cloth), Tokyo: Kodansha, 1993, ISBN 978-4-7700-1732-1; ISBN 978-4-7700-2064-2 (paper)

== Works in print in Japanese ==
The Japanese publisher Kodansha currently publishes an 80-volume series: Yoshikawa Eiji Rekishi Jidai Bunko (吉川英治歴史時代文庫), or Eiji Yoshikawa's Historical Fiction in Paperback. Kodansha numbers the series from 1 to 80.

- 1 — 剣難女難 (Kennan Jonan) – Sword Trouble, Woman Trouble
- 2–4 (in three volumes) – 鳴門秘帖 (Naruto Hichō) – Secret Record of Naruto
- 5–7 (in three volumes) – 江戸三國志 (Edo Sangoku-shi) – The Three Kingdoms of Edo
- 8 – かんかん虫は唄う (Kankan Mushi wa Utau) – "The rustbeater (dockworker that beats rust off steamships, boilers etc) sings" and other stories
- 9 – 牢獄の花嫁 (Rougoku no Hanayome) – The Jail Bride
- 10 – 松の露八 (Matsu no Rohachi) – Rohachi of the Pines
- 11–13 (in three volumes) – 親鸞 (Shinran)
- 14–21 (in eight volumes) – 宮本武蔵 (Miyamoto Musashi)
- 22–32 (in eleven volumes) – 新書太閣記 (Shinsho Taikōki) – paperback Life of the Taiko
- 33–40 (in eight volumes) – 三國志 (Sangoku shi) – Romance of the Three Kingdoms
- 41–42 (in two volumes) – 源頼朝 (Minamoto no Yoritomo)
- 43 – 上杉謙信 (Uesugi Kenshin)
- 44 – 黒田如水 (Kuroda Josui)
- 45 – 大岡越前 (Ooka Echizen)
- 46 – 平の将門 (Taira no Masakado)
- 47–62 (in sixteen volumes) – 新平家物語 (Shin Heike monogatari) – New Tale of the Heike
- 63–70 (in eight volumes) – 私本太平記 (Shihon Taihei ki) – Private Version of the Grand Peace Chronicle
- 71–74 (in four volumes) – 新水滸伝 (Shin Suikoden) – New Tales from the Water Margin
- 75 – 治朗吉格子 (Jirokichi Goshi) – "Jirokichi Goshi" and other stories
- 76 – 柳生月影抄 (Yagyu Tsukikage sho) – "The Papers of Yagyu Tsukikage" and other stories
- 77 – 忘れ残りの記 (Wasurenokori no ki) – Record of Things Left Unforgotten
- 78–80 (in three volumes) – 神州天馬侠 (Shinshu Tenma Kyo) - The Godly State of the Heroic Pegasus
