= Hissatsu Shikirinin =

Japanese TV drama series

- Also known as: 必殺仕切人
- Genre: Jidaigeki
- Directed by: Tokuzo Tanaka
- Starring: Machiko Kyō; Akira Onodera; Kiyoshi Nakajō
- Theme music composer: Masaaki Hirao
- Country of origin: Japan
- Original language: Japanese
- No. of episodes: 18

Production
- Producers: Hisashi Yamauchi; Yozo Sakurai
- Running time: 45 minutes (per episode)
- Production companies: Asahi, Shochiku

Original release
- Network: TV Asahi
- Release: August 31 – December 28, 1984

Hissatsu Watashinin (必殺仕切人) is a Japanese television jidaigeki or period drama that was broadcast in 1984. It is the 22nd in the Hissatsu series.

== Cast ==
- Machiko Kyō as Okuni
- Akira Onodera as Shinkichi
- Midori Nishizaki
- Gannosuke Ashiya as Kanppie
- Etsushi Takahashi as Toranosuke
- Yuriko Hishimi as Okatsu
- Kiyoshi Nakajō as Yuji
