= Taeko Hattori =

Japanese actress

- Born: 23 June 1949 (age 77); Nagoya
- Citizenship: Japan
- Occupations: stage, film, and television actress

Taeko Hattori (服部 妙子, Hattori Taeko; born June 23, 1949) is a Japanese stage, film, and television actress. She is from Nagoya, and graduated from high school there. She then joined the Dreamy 7 agency, and then M.M.P, to which she belongs.

Her film appearances include Sotsugyō ryokō (1970), Submersion of Japan (1973), Cape Erimo and Zesshō (1975), Ganpeki no Haha (1976), Ōjō Anraku-koku (1978), Tokugawa no Jotei: Ōoku (1988), Baburu to neta onna-tachi (1998), Quartet and Sennen no koi - Hikaru Genji monogatari (2001), Aruku Chikara (2004), and Koharu Komachi (2005). On television, Taeko is a frequent guest star in jidaigeki roles, including Zenigata Heiji, Gokenin Zankurō, Kakushi Metsuki Sanjō and the Hissatsu series. She often appeared on Abarenbō Shōgun (for example, Series 2 #13; 3 #12, 128). In contemporary roles, her appearances include Niji-iro Teikibin on the NHK Educational network (on which she was a semi-regular), Ten made Todoke (as a regular), and Hagure Keiji Junjōha.

Taeko has also made commercials. Among her clients are American Home Assurance Company and Kao.

== Sources ==
- This article includes material from 服部妙子 (Hattori Taeko) in the Japanese Wikipedia, retrieved on February 19, 2008.
- Taeko Hattori at IMDb
- 服部妙子 at JMDB
- 服部妙子 at M.M.P agency official page
- Abarenbō Shōgun II guest list
- Abarenbō Shōgun III guest list
