= Jiraiya =

Figure in Japanese folklore

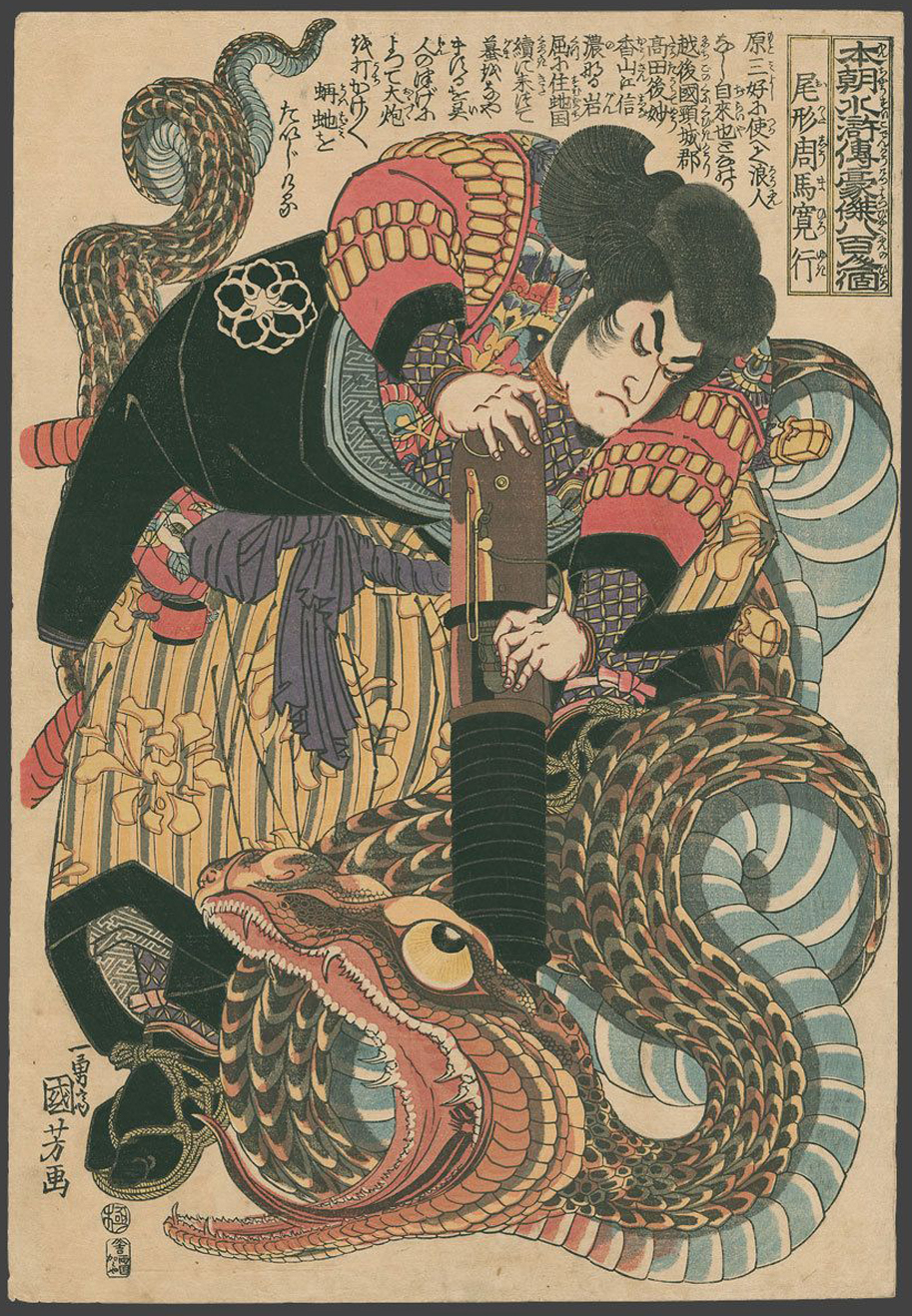
Shuma Hiroyuki, later known as Jiraiya, using a heavy gun to defeat a huge snake that preyed on his toads.

Jiraiya (自来也 or 児雷也, literally "Young Thunder"), originally known as Ogata Shuma Hiroyuki (尾形周馬寛行), is the toad-riding protagonist of the Japanese folk tale Katakiuchi Kidan Jiraiya Monogatari (報仇奇談自来也説話, The Tale of the Gallant Jiraiya). The tale was originally a Yomihon that was published in 1806–1807, and was adapted into a serialized novel that was written by different authors and published in 43 installments from 1839 to 1868; one of its illustrators was woodblock artist Kunisada. Kawatake Mokuami then wrote a kabuki drama based on the first ten parts of the novel, which premiered in Edo in 1852, starring Ichikawa Danjūrō VIII in the leading role. Since then the story has been adapted into several films, video games, manga, and has also influenced various other works.

== Classic tale – Katakiuchi Kidan Jiraiya Monogatari ==
Katakiuchi Kidan Jiraiya Monogatari (報仇奇談自来也説話) is considered the first novel or Yomihon to be adapted into a kabuki play, the novel was written by Kanwatei Onitake (感和亭鬼武) and was published between 1806 and 1807. The story was later adapted many more times with variations in the story.

=== Part 1: (books 1–5) ===
The tale of Jiraiya starts with a poor, masterless samurai named Isami Gentaro, who's wrongfully jailed because he could not afford the rent for his farm. His family manages to get the money to pay his bail so Isami's father, Kirakusai, travels alongside his grandson, Tomokichi, to pay Isami's bail. However, on the way to free Isami, Kirakusai is attacked and killed by Master Rokuyaon Gun who kidnaps the two-year-old Tomokichi and abandons him in a valley. During this time, a masterless samurai of the Miyoshi House, Ogata Shuma Hiroyuki, better known as "Jiraiya", happens upon the young Tomokichi and decides to raise him as his son.

Gentaro is later released with the help of other villagers and becomes a vassal of Shiizu Kunihisa after proving his courage as a samurai at the same time as Master Gun. Gentaro and Master Gun then begin working together to capture Jiraiya as he is a wanted criminal. Fortunately, though caught, Jiraiya manages to scheme his way out of jail. Gentaro eventually meets his wife, Soe (who now goes by "Seino"), and they discuss the former's hatred for whoever killed his father and son, both unaware the latter is alive. Master Gun eavesdrops on this conversation and decides to steal their Amulet of Protection, also known as the "Seitensō" (西天草), and proceeds to kill both Gentaro and Soe. Tomokichi—whilst engaged in a duel with Master Gun for Midori, the stepdaughter of Gentaro—learns that it was he who murdered his family. While this allows Tomokichi a chance to exact his revenge, he is unable to take it as Master Gun uses the Amulet of Protection to escape.

Master Gun is chased to Mt. Miyoko by Tomokichi and, upon reaching the mountain, is accosted by the spirits of the dead until he arrives to a grotto where the Immortal Toad Ascetic lives. They converse, and the immortal sees all of Master Guns' sins and even tells him that, since there are dead souls haunting him, he must be a murderer and that he'll die from his sins. Terrified, Master Gun begs the immortal to save him, to which he agrees but saying he will only help him once. The immortal then uses his magic arts to send Master Gun down the mountain before warning him if he tells anyone of this encounter he will die. However, later that night, after getting drunk with one of Jiraiya's followers, Master Gun tells him of the events at Mt. Miyoko. The morning after Master Gun leaves, Jiraiya goes to Mt. Miyoko to visit the Immortal. The Toad Ascetic then appears in front of Jiraiya and tells him that, even though he is a bandit who committed innumerable sins, he'll teach him one magic art as he admires Jiraiya's loyalty. While Master Gun and Jiraiya are visiting the immortal, Tomokichi sets out to find them and, upon finally locating Jiraiya, recounts to his stepfather of what has happened to his family. Jiraiya vows to assist Tomokichi in his revenge and will be there to help when he is needed, sending his troops to steal the Seitenso from Master Gun so as to lure him out in order to kill him.

After luring Master Gun to a place called Kagamigaura, Tomokichi and Master Gun then engage in battle. While Tomokichi almost fails, he is able to turn the tide thanks to Jiraiya's encouragement, announces he'll avenge his grandfather and parents, and finally cuts off Master Guns' head, ending part one and the first revenge story.

==== Part 2: (books 5–10) ====
The second part opens up with the immortal on Mt. Miyoko appearing to Jiraiya in his dreams asking for his assistance in return for teaching him more magic arts. Jiraiya sets off towards the mountain to save his master and, when he arrives, sees a monstrous snake fighting his master, who's taken on the form of a giant toad. Jiraiya manages to kill the snake and is rewarded by the immortal with more magic arts, which he then uses to rob a wealthy man right after learning them. Since Jiraiya is wanted by the government, he became a pirate and started plundering commercial ships, until one night at sea the ghost of his former lord, Miyoshi Nagashige asks him to take revenge on the Ishido family, more specifically Ishido Haruchika. Jiraiya agrees and he soon after saves a vassal of Ishido named Agawa Uneo, and his companion Nagisa, the younger sister of another vassal named Madeno Hamanosuke, to which he tosses Agawa Uneo into the sea and takes Nagisa hostage. Agawa Uneo is then saved by a former member of his group and begins to pursue Jiraiya immediately after recovering. During this time, Madeno Hamanosuke goes to Mt. Kinki to pray to Benzaiten, a god related to snakes, for the safety of his lord. He is answered by a goddess who appears before him and gives him the Stone Conch, otherwise known as the "Ishihara" (石螺), which holds the power to negate magic arts and repel evil.

Meanwhile, Tomokichi has become a vassal of Shiizu Kunihisa after taking revenge on Master Gun and is ordered to take back the Amulet of Protection from Jiraiya, to which he sets off in search of his adoptive father. After finding Jiraiya, Tomokichi asks him to return the Amulet of Protection to which the former agrees, but only after the next six months as he needs it to complete his revenge. In order to keep this meeting a secret, Jiraiya summons a powerful tsunami to kill all of Tomokichi's troops despite the latter's pleads for mercy to his men. After all is said and done, Jiraiya invites Tomokichi to go with him on his revenge quest so that he would not be punished.

Jiraiya then begins his plan, first by robbing betrothal gifts for Ishido Haruchika's daughter, Tamahitohime, which leads to the death of Nagisa. After sneaking into the Nitsuki House, Jiraiya summons a tsunami to kill all of the servants in order for his troops to pose as them and sneak into the Ishido residence. Jiraiya then finds a mountain hermit who was going to treat one of Ishido Haruchika's sick daughters and kills him, he then pretends to be the mountain hermit in order to sneak into the Ishido House. After sneaking into Ishido Haruchikas's room, Jiraiya then cuts off his head.

Afterwards, Jiraiya calls on Tomokichi to return the Amulet of Protection as promised. However, Madeno Hamanosuke shows up and announces the head of the man Jiraiya cut off actually belonged to Agawa Uneo and all of his troops were captured because a member of the Jiraiya's group, Asazuma was a vassal of Ishido and warned the Ishido house of his plan. Jiraiya tries to use his magic arts to defeat Madeno Hamanosuke, however, Madeno uses the Stone Conch that was given to him by Benzaiten to negate Jiraiya's magic arts. Jiraiya finally realizes that his death is at hand as he lived a sinful life and this is his justice so, before anyone can kill him, he commits suicide and turns to stone.

=== Characters ===
Isami Gentaro – Tomokichis's father who is imprisoned at the beginning of the story, and later becomes a vassal of Shiizu Kunihisa. He hunts down the bandit Jiraiya, but is killed by Master Rokuyaon Gun as part of his plot to steal the Amulet of Protection.

Kirakusai Gentaro – Isamis's father and the grandfather of Tomokichi, who is killed by Master Rokuyaon Gun whilst on his way to pay his son's bail.

Soe Gentaro – Isami's wife and Tomokichis mother, sells herself to a brothel to pay for her husband's bail. She is later reunited with her husband but is killed alongside him by Master Rokuyaon Gun as part of his plan to steal the Amulet of Protection.

Master Rokuyaon Gun – One of the story's main antagonists who seeks the Amulet of Protection, he is killed by Tomokichi as part of the first revenge plot that makes up the story.

Tomokichi Gentaro – Jiraiya's adopted son, he is kidnapped by Master Rokuyaon Gun as a child and left to die but is found by Jiraiya. He grows up and takes revenge on Master Rokuyaon Gun for killing his family.

Ogata Shuma Hiroyuki – Otherwise known as "Jiraiya", he is the titular protagonist of the story.

Shiizu Kunihisa – The head of the Kunihisa household who Master Rokuyaon Gun and Isami Gentaro served before their deaths and who Tomokichi later serves after taking his revenge on Master Rokuyaon Gun.

The Immortal Toad Ascetic – The Immortal Toad Ascetic that lives on Mt. Miyoko and helps Master Rokuyaon Gun escape, he teaches Jiraiya several magic arts throughout the story.

Miyoshi Nagashige – Ogata Shuma Hiroyuki's late lord, he appears to Jiraiya as a ghost and asks him to take vengeance on the Ishido House, but more specifically on Ishido Haruchika.

Ishido Haruchika – The head of the Haruchika family, he is the second antagonist of the story as he is the one that Jiraiya is asked to kill by his late lord, Miyoshi Nagashige.

Agawa Uneo – A vassal of Ishido Haruchika, he is captured by Jiraiya and tossed into the sea before later being used as a decoy for lord Ishido during Jiraiya's plan to take revenge.

Madeno Hamanosuke – Another vassal of Ishido Haruchika, whose sister is captured by Jiraiya and later on dies, so he plans to take revenge on Jiraiya. He is also given the Stone Conch, otherwise known as the "Ishihara" (石螺), which was given to him by the god Benzaiten in order to negate Jiraiya's magic arts.

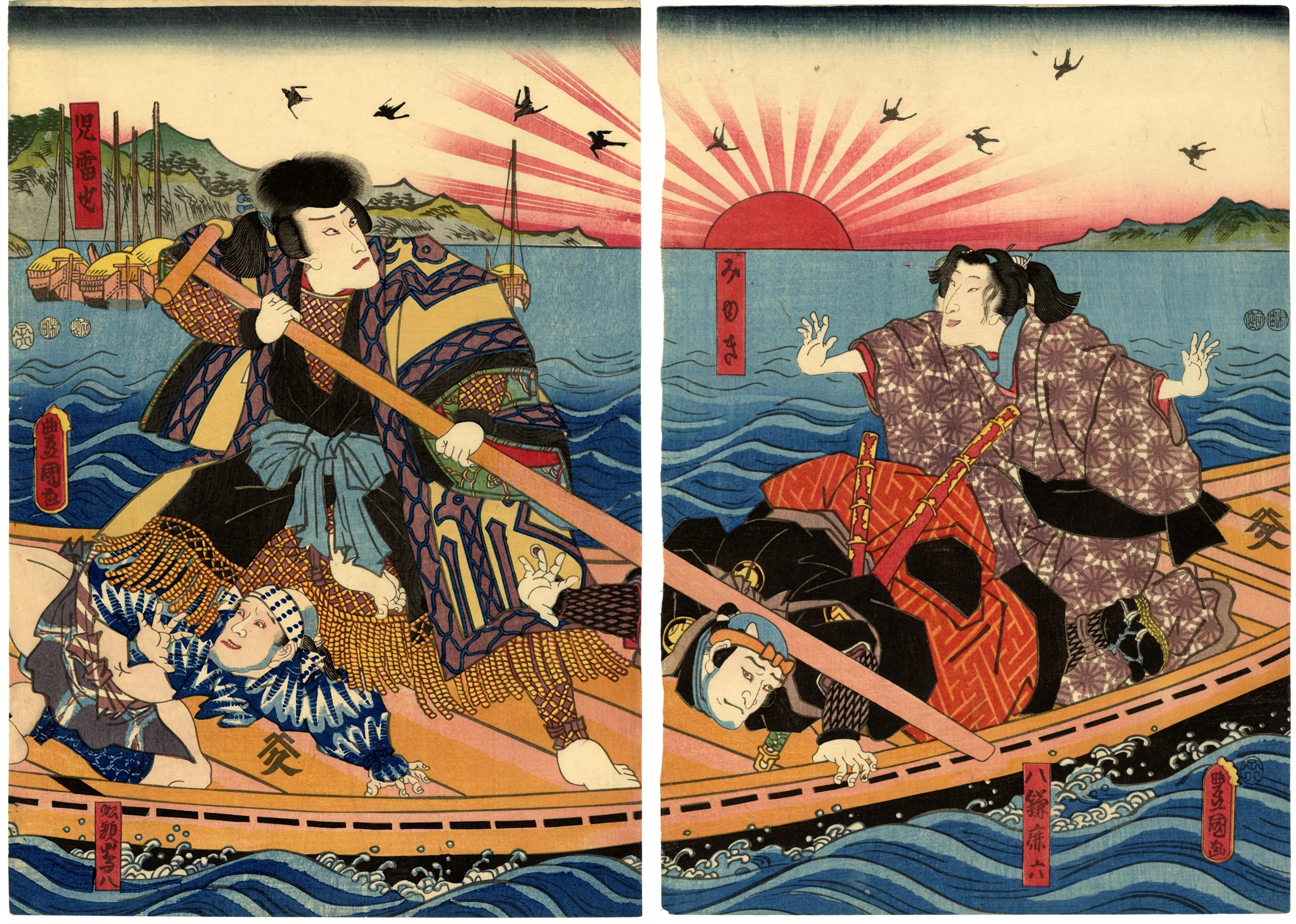
Jiraiya, Sunrise and Boat, Ukiyo-e by Utagawa Kunisada (1852).

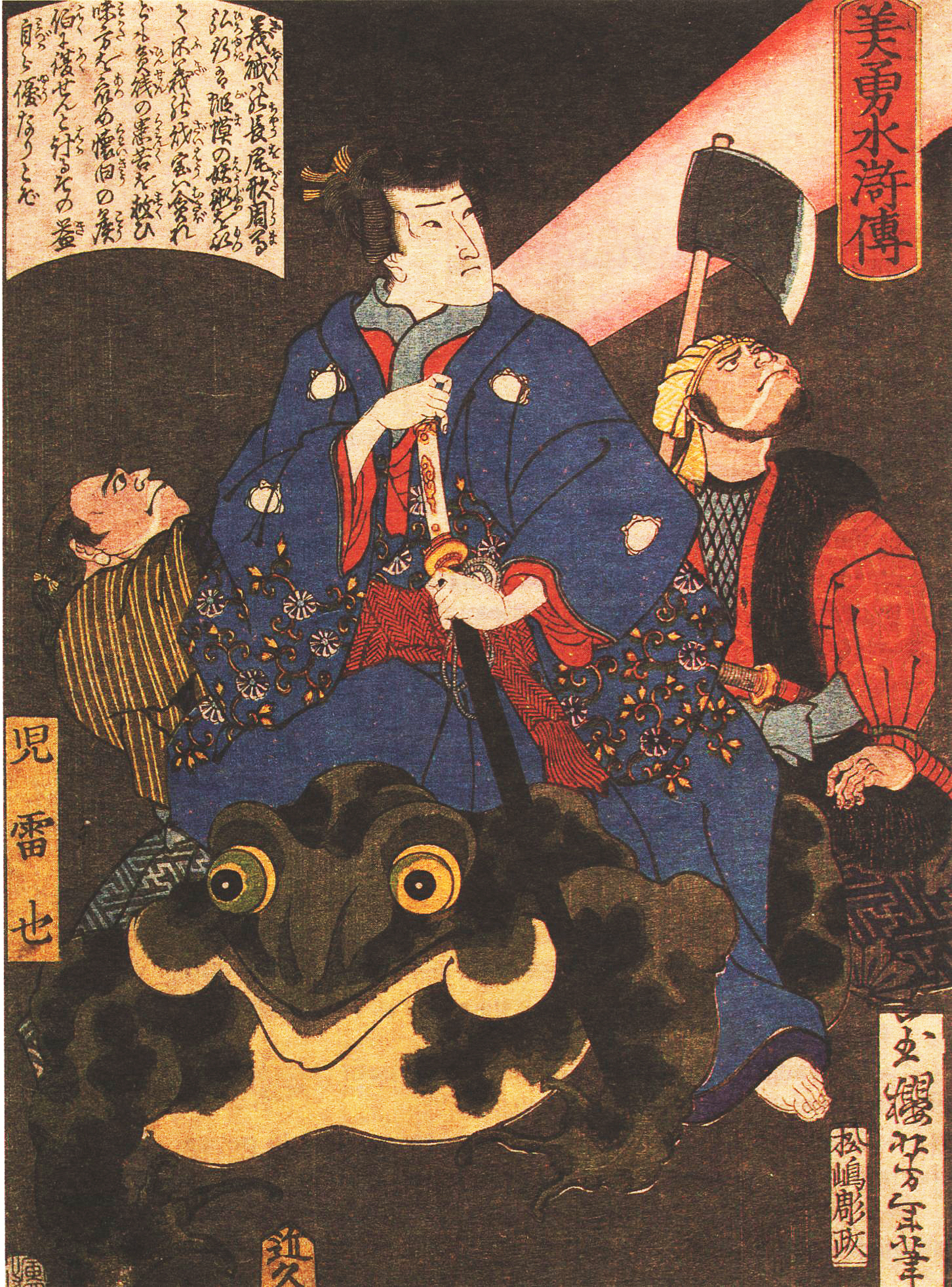
Jiraiya riding a giant toad, depicted in an 1866 print by Yoshitoshi

== English translation – Jiraiya, or the Magic Frog ==
=== Plot ===
A popular version of the story was translated by William Elliot Griffis. The story starts with Jiraiya's father, who was a castle lord, but was killed during one of many civil wars. After he is killed, young Jiraiya is hidden by a retainer and is able to escape, but they are attacked by a band of robbers and the retainer is killed after resisting. Jiraiya goes to a place called Echigo where he spent the rest of his childhood. Jiraiya now led a wandering life in several provinces but wished to restore his family name. His swordsmanship talent and exceptional bravery allowed Jiraiya to soon become a chief of his own band of robbers, where he would sneak in disguise to places he robbed in order to learn where the treasure was stored. He would then come back and steal said treasure later.

One day, Jiraiya heard of an old man who lived in Shinano and so he started off to rob him. The land was a place full of mountains and was full of snow in the winter. During the journey, he was beset by a great snowstorm and he took refuge in a small house that he happened upon, inside was a beautiful woman who treated him with great kindness. This did not change Jiraiya's nature as a robber though and after midnight he went to kill her with his sword while she was reading. However, in a flash, her body changed to a very old man who grabbed the heavy steel blade and easily broke it into pieces. He then announces his name as Senso Dojin, and that he is a giant frog that has lived on the mountain for hundreds of years. He pardons Jiraiya after telling him he could kill him easily and then teaches him magic arts. Jiraiya stayed with Senso Dojin for several weeks learning the magic arts of the mountain sprites in order to control the weather as well as to control frogs and change their shape and size at will. After Senso teaches him he forbids him from robbing or injuring the poor and helpless and to instead take from those who use and acquire money dishonestly and to help the needy and suffering. He then turns into a giant frog and hops away.

After this Jiraiya sets out on his journey to help the poor and needy by helping a poor farmer whose crops failed and he could not pay his rent or loan on time. As well whenever a miser was robbed they would say that the young thunder had struck, as Jiraiya was very popular with the poor people of the time.

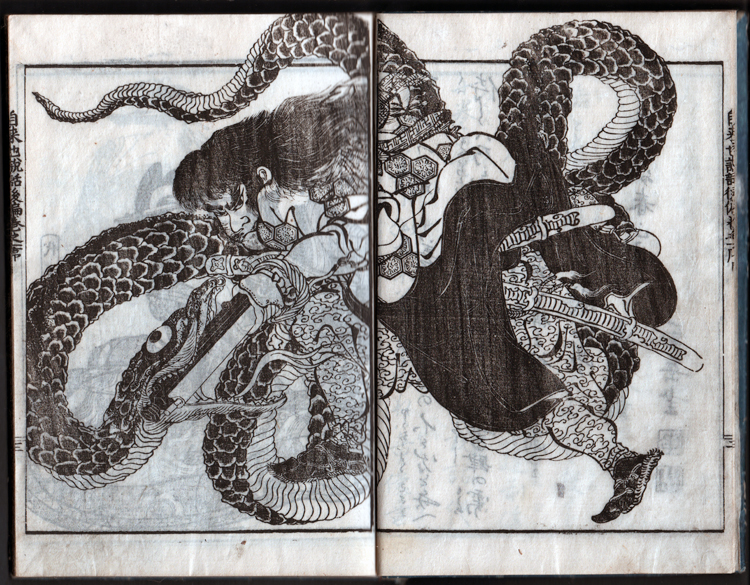
The image above is of Jiraiya wrestling with Yashagorō

During this time when Jiraiya was helping the poor and needy, a young maiden named Tsunade also lived in the same province of Kiushiu. She was a model daughter and was always obedient and kind. One day during her trip into the mountains for firewood she met a very old man who approached her and told her he had lived in the mountains for hundreds of years and that his body was really that of a snail. He then offers to teach Tsunade the powers of magic he possesses. She gladly accepted and began training daily with the old man. Once she had mastered the magic, she was advised to use her powers to defend the poor and destroy wicked robbers, and to join her powers with Jiraiya in the form of marriage. The old man then turns into a snail and crawls away. Tsunade then remarks that she and Jiraiya with the combination of slug magic and frog magic would be able to destroy a robber named Orochimaru, who was the son of a serpent. Tsunade and Jiraiya eventually met and were married soon after.

Soon after Jiraiya and Tsunade were married war broke out in Japan between the Tsukikage and the Inukage. In the war, the Tsukikage sought out the help of Jiraiya and Tsunade who agreed to help them with the war, while the other clan the Inukage sought the help of Orochimaru otherwise known as Dragon-coil. Orochimaru was known as a very wicked robber whose father was a man and mother was a serpent that lived at the bottom of lake Takura, he was skilled in the magic of the serpent and would spew venom on the strongest of warriors to destroy them.

During a respite between the conflicts, Jiraiya and Tsunade were resting in a monastery. In the monastery, there was also a princess named Tagoto that had fled from Orochimaru as he wanted her to be his bride. She hated Orochimaru and did not want to marry him, however, when Orochimaru upon hearing that Tagoto and Jiraiya were in the same monastery, immediately made his way to the monastery. He then kidnapped the princess Tagoto and poured poisonous venom onto the sleeping Jiraiya and Tsunade. After they are poisoned one of Jiraiya's pages, Rikimatsu, volunteers to go to India to retrieve the only antidote to cure Jiraiya and Tsunade. Rikimatsu then uses the magic he learned from the Tengus of the mountains to fly to India and back in one day and one night to deliver the antidote. After Jiraiya and his wife recovered the war broke out again, and in a great battle Orochimaru was killed and Tagoto was rescued. Jiraiya was rewarded by being made a daimyo of Idzu.

At this point, Jiraiya had grown tired of war and the hardships that an active life brought, and he was glad to settle down to a peaceful life in Idzu. He spent the remainder of his day in peace and tranquility among his children and his grandchildren.

=== Characters ===
Ogata - Jiraiyas's late father was a castle lord in Kyushu and was slain during a civil war.

Jiraiya – otherwise known as “young thunder”, is the protagonist of the story. His father was a castle lord in Kisushiu, but was killed when he was young. He then becomes a bandit who uses his frog magic arts to help the poor and needy.

Tsunade – Jiraiya's wife, who is taught slug magic by an old man whose real body turns out to be a slug. Her magic is strong against snake magic.

Senso Dojin – he appears as an old man who teaches Jiraiya frog magic, and later reveals himself to be a giant frog.

Orochimaru – otherwise known as 'Dragon Coil', is the son of a snake and is able to use snake magic, which is strong against frog magic. He is the main antagonist of the story.

Rikimatsu – One of Jiraiya's pages, he learns tengu magic and is instrumental in saving Jiraiya and Tsunade when they are poisoned by Orochimaru.

== Popular culture ==
=== Manga and anime ===
In episode 179 of the Urusei Yatsura anime series, Cherry summons a giant slug and a giant toad to fight the spirit of a giant snake that possessed Sakura.

The story of Jiraiya inspired three homonymous characters in the Naruto franchise. Several names in Naruto, such as the Tsuchikage—used as the title for the leader of the Stone Village—also draw from this folklore. During the Jiraiya Arc and his death scene, the phrase "Tale of the Gallant Jiraiya" is prominently referenced. Many pivotal characters and narrative elements throughout the Naruto manga are heavily influenced by The Tale of the Gallant Jiraiya.

=== Television shows ===
The eighteenth Super Sentai season, Ninja Sentai Kakuranger, features a character named Jiraiya (played by Kane Kosugi) who summons a giant black toad mecha. In the Kamen Rider franchise, both ninja-motif Kamen Riders Tycoon and Shinobi, from Kamen Rider Geats and Kamen Rider Zi-O respectively, have frogs as their mentors and supporters.

The seventh installment of the Metal Hero Series, Sekai Ninja Sen Jiraiya, features ninja student Toha Yamaji who identifies himself as Jiraiya to combat The Sorcerers Clan.

=== Video games ===
A Persona representing the spirit of Jiraiya in the form of a red-scarved humanoid whose head vaguely resembles that of a cartoon ninja frog decked with shuriken on his hands, as well as bell-bottoms is summoned by the character Yosuke Hanamura in the video game Persona 4.

In the video game franchise Pokémon, Greninja is a Water/Dark-type Pokémon, the evolved form of Frogadier, and the final evolved form of Froakie, the Water-type starter of the Kalos region. It has the appearance and abilities of both a frog and a ninja, pulling inspiration from Jiraiya.

In the 2013 video game Muramasa Rebirth, one of the alternate endings has the Iga ninja Arashimaru getting possessed by his final opponent's spirit and taking on the name "Orochimaru". In a desperate act of defiance, Arashimaru's ally Shirohebi has the ninja's former master Shiranui spirit away a rival clan's last surviving heir during Orochimaru's attack who, when grown, takes on the name "Jiraiya" to fight Orochimaru.

== See also ==
- Japanese folklore
- Jiraiya the Hero
- The Magic Serpent
- Sekai Ninja Sen Jiraiya
- Susanoo
- Yamata no Orochi
