= Charles Sanford Terry (translator) =

American academic (1926–1982)

- Born: 1926; Laurel, Mississippi
- Died: 1982 (aged 55–56)
- Education: Duke University; Columbia University
- Occupation: translator

Charles Sanford Terry (1926–1982) was an American translator and academic in the fields of Japanese history, art, and literature.

== Life and career ==
Born in Laurel, Mississippi, in 1926, Terry would go on to graduate from Duke University. He first began to study Japanese while serving in the United States Navy during World War II. After the war he continued with his studies and eventually earned a Master's Degree from Columbia University in the field of Japanese history. Terry earned a second master's degree in Chinese history from the University of Tokyo and went on to be a translator in numerous fields dealing with Japan. Among his many translations, Terry provided the English translation for Eiji Yoshikawa's historical novel Musashi of the renowned Japanese swordsman Miyamoto Musashi.

For many years, Terry was employed as the representative in Tokyo of publisher Harry N. Abrams, Inc.
