= Kajikawa Yoriteru =

Kajikawa Yoriteru (梶川 頼照, 1647 – September 7, 1722) was a Japanese samurai of the Edo period, who served as a lesser official in the Tokugawa shogunate. He was also known as Kajikawa Yosōbei (梶川 与惣兵衛). Kajikawa served on guard duty in Edo Castle.

Upon inheriting family headship, he became hatamoto (the direct vassal of a shōgun) and his annual stipend was 700 koku.

In 1701, he witnessed Asano Naganori injuring Kira Yoshinaka, and he arrested Asano. The action was evaluated and his annual salary was raised to 1200 koku. He later described the details of the incident in the Kajikawa Yosōbei diary (梶川与惣兵衛, Kajikawa Yosōbei nikki).

His grave is at Kanryūzan Tentokuin (乾竜山天徳院), in Nakano, Tokyo.

== See also ==
- Forty-seven rōnin
