= Tsunade =

Japanese folktale heroine

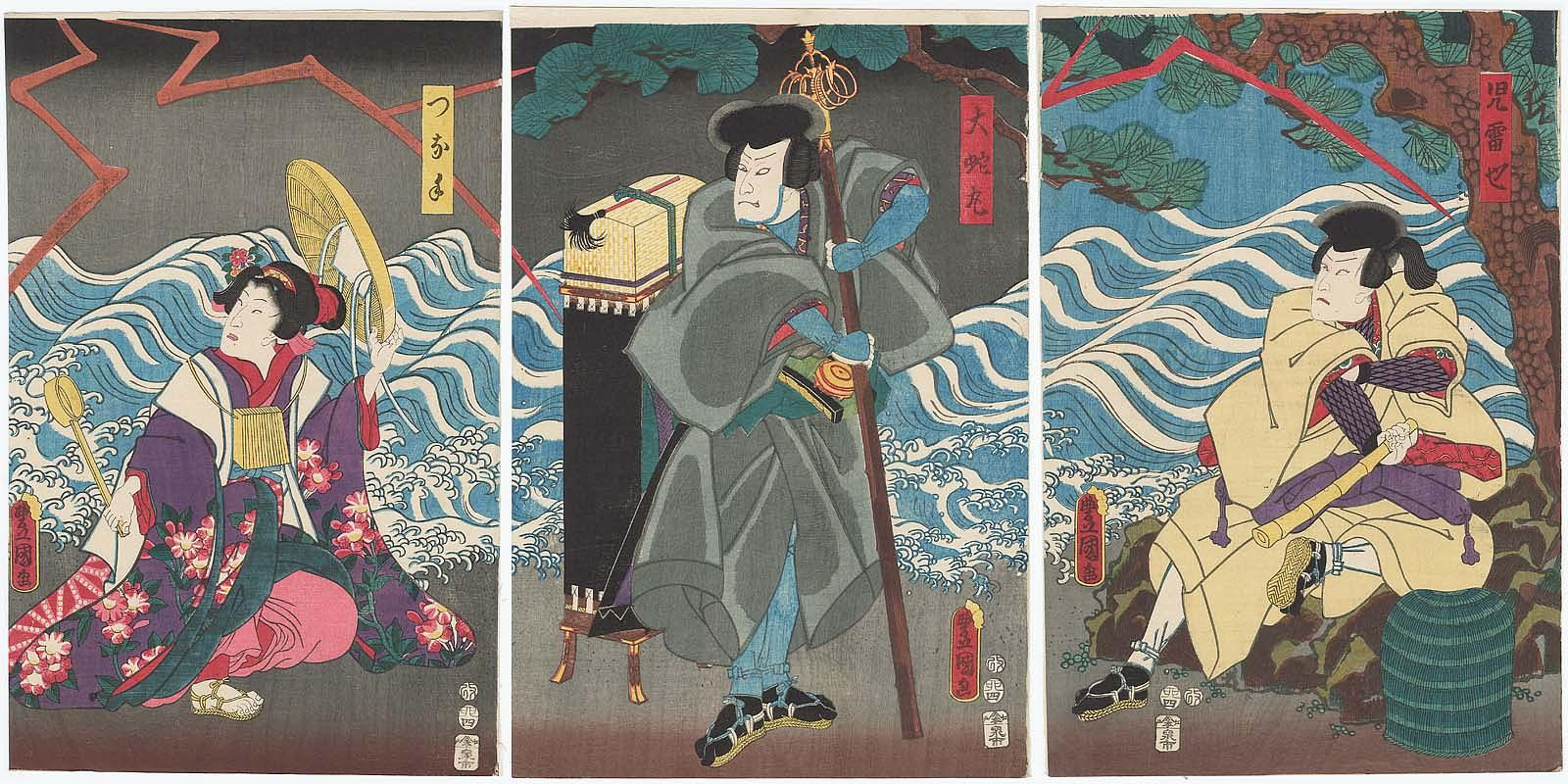
Actors Bandô Takesaburô I as Tsunade (L), Arashi Kichisaburô III as Orochimaru (C), and Kawarazaki Gonjûrô I as Jiraiya (R)

Tsunade (綱手), featured in the Japanese folktale Jiraiya Gōketsu Monogatari (児雷也豪傑物語; "The Tale of the Gallant Jiraiya"), is Jiraiya's wife and is taught slug magic by an old man whose real body turns out to be a slug. Her magic is strong against snake magic.

== English translation – Jiraiya, or the Magic Frog ==
=== Plot ===
A popular version of the story was translated by William Elliot Griffis. In his version, a young maiden named Tsunade lived in a province of Kyushu. She was a model daughter, always obedient and kind. One day, during her trip into the mountains for firewood, she met a very old man who approached her and told her he had lived in the mountains for hundreds of years and that his body was, in fact, that of a snail. He then offers to teach Tsunade the powers of magic he possesses. She gladly accepted and began training daily with the old man. Once she had mastered the magic, she was advised to use her powers to defend the poor and destroy wicked robbers, and to join her powers with Jiraiya in the form of marriage. The old man then turns into a snail and crawls away. Tsunade then remarks that she and Jiraiya, with the combination of slug magic and frog magic, would be able to destroy a robber named Orochimaru, who was the son of a serpent. Tsunade and Jiraiya eventually met and were married soon after.

Soon after Jiraiya and Tsunade were married, war broke out in Japan between the Tsukikage and the Inukage. In the war, the Tsukikage sought out the help of Jiraiya and Tsunade, who agreed to help them with the war, while the other clan, the Inukage, sought the help of Orochimaru, otherwise known as Dragon-coil. Orochimaru was known as a very wicked robber whose father was a man and his mother was a serpent that lived at the bottom of Lake Takura. He was skilled in the magic of the serpent and would spew venom on the strongest of warriors to destroy them.

During a respite between the conflicts, Jiraiya and Tsunade were resting in a monastery. In the monastery, there was also a princess named Tagoto who had fled from Orochimaru as he wanted her to be his bride. She hated Orochimaru and did not want to marry him. However, when Orochimaru heard that Tagoto and Jiraiya were in the same monastery, he immediately made his way there. He then kidnapped the princess Tagoto and poured poisonous venom onto the sleeping Jiraiya and Tsunade. After they are poisoned by one of Jiraiya's pages, Rikimatsu volunteers to go to India to retrieve the only antidote to cure Jiraiya and Tsunade. Rikimatsu then uses the magic he learned from the tengus of the mountains, and he flies to India and back in one day and one night to deliver the antidote. After Jiraiya and his wife recovered, the war broke out again. In a great battle, Orochimaru was killed, and Tagoto was rescued. Jiraiya was rewarded by being made a daimyo of Izu Province.

At this point, Jiraiya had grown tired of war and the hardships that an active life brought, and he and Tsunade settled down to a peaceful life in Izu. They spent the remainder of their days in peace and tranquillity among their children and grandchildren.

== Influences on fiction ==
In the manga and anime series Naruto, characters named Tsunade, Jiraiya, and Orochimaru appear as three legendary ninja known as the Densetsu no Sannin (伝説の三忍).
