= The Human Condition I: No Greater Love =

No Greater Love
- Theatrical release poster
- Directed by: Masaki Kobayashi
- Written by: Masaki Kobayashi; Zenzo Matsuyama
- Based on: The Human Condition by Junpei Gomikawa
- Produced by: Shigeru Wakatsuki
- Starring: Tatsuya Nakadai; Michiyo Aratama
- Cinematography: Yoshio Miyajima
- Edited by: Keiichi Uraoka
- Music by: Chuji Kinoshita
- Production company: Ninjin Club
- Distributed by: Shochiku
- Release date: 15 January 1959
- Running time: 206 minutes
- Country: Japan
- Language: Japanese
- Box office: Japan rentals: ¥304.04 million

The Human Condition I: No Greater Love (第一部 純愛篇／第二部 激怒篇) is a 1959 Japanese epic war drama film directed by Masaki Kobayashi. It is the first part of The Human Condition trilogy.

== Plot ==
In World War II-era Japan, Kaji marries his sweetheart Michiko despite his misgivings about the future. To gain exemption from military service, he moves with his wife to a large mining operation in Japanese-colonized Manchuria, where he serves as a labor chief assigned to a workforce of Chinese prisoners.

Kaji aggravates the camp bureaucracy by implementing humane practices to improve both labor conditions and productivity, clashing with foremen, administrators, and the Kenpeitai military police. Ultimately his efforts to grant autonomy to the POWs are undermined by scheming officials, resulting in the electrocution of several prisoners and the beheading of others accused of attempted escape. When Kaji protests the brutality, he is tortured and then drafted into the army to relieve the camp supervisors of his disruptive presence.

== Cast ==
- Tatsuya Nakadai as Kaji
- Michiyo Aratama as Michiko
- Chikage Awashima as Tōfuku Kin
- Ineko Arima as Shunran Yō
- Sō Yamamura as Okishima
- Keiji Sada as Kageyama
- Kōji Nanbara as Kao (as Shinji Nanbara)
- Akira Ishihama as Chen
- Kōji Mitsui as Furuya
- Seiji Miyaguchi as Wang Heng Li
- Eitaro Ozawa as Okazaki
- Toru Abe as Sergeant Watai
- Junkichi Orimoto as Sai
- Masao Mishima as Manager Kuroki
- Kyū Sazanka as Cho Meisan

== Reception ==
On the review aggregator website Rotten Tomatoes, 73% of 15 critics' reviews are positive. At the 14th Mainichi Film Awards, Giyū Miyajima won Best Cinematography for both this film and The Human Condition II: Road to Eternity.
