= The Human Condition II: Road to Eternity =

Road to Eternity
- Theatrical release poster
- Directed by: Masaki Kobayashi
- Screenplay by: Masaki Kobayashi
- Story by: Junpei Gomikawa
- Based on: The Human Condition by Junpei Gomikawa
- Produced by: Shigeru Wakatsuki
- Starring: Tatsuya Nakadai
- Production companies: Ninjin Club; Shochiku
- Distributed by: Shochiku
- Release date: November 20, 1959 (Japan)
- Running time: 178 minutes
- Country: Japan
- Language: Japanese

Road to Eternity (Japanese: 第四部戦雲篇) is a 1959 Japanese film co-written and directed by Masaki Kobayashi. It is the second part of The Human Condition trilogy.

Stephen Prince states that "Kobayashi makes "The Road to Eternity" into an excoriation of the Imperial Army. The film is focused, as he said, on "a theme of resistance to the inhumane military organization."

== Plot ==
Kaji, having lost his exemption from military service by protecting Chinese prisoners from unjust punishment, has now been conscripted into the Japanese Kwantung Army. Under suspicion of leftist sympathies, Kaji is assigned the toughest duties in his military recruiting class despite his excellent marksmanship and strong barracks discipline. His wife Michiko pleads for understanding in a letter to his commanding officer and later pays Kaji a highly unorthodox visit to his military facility to express her love and solidarity. Kaji considers escaping across the front with his friend Shinjo, who is similarly under suspicion due to his brother's arrest for communist activities. Distrusting the idea that desertion will lead to freedom, and being faithful to his wife, Kaji ultimately commits to continued military service despite his hardships.

When Obara, a poor-sighted, weak soldier in Kaji's unit, kills himself after troubles from home are compounded by ceaseless punishment and humiliation from other soldiers, Kaji demands disciplinary action from his superiors for PFC Yoshida, the ring leader of the troops who pushed Obara over the brink. While Yoshida is not disciplined, Kaji helps to seal his fate by refusing to rescue the vicious soldier when both men are trapped in quicksand while in pursuit of Shinjo, who finally seized the opportunity to desert. Kaji is released from hospitalization related to the quicksand incident and is transported to the front with his unit.

Kaji is asked to lead a group of recruits and promoted to private first class. He accepts his assignment with the condition that his men will be separated from a group of veteran artillerymen, who practice intense cruelty as punishment for the slightest offenses. Often taking the punishment for his men, Kaji is personally beaten many times by these veterans, despite his relationship with Second Lieutenant Kageyama. Demoralized by the fall of Okinawa and continually battling with the veterans, Kaji and most of his men are sent on a month-long trench digging work detail. Their work is interrupted by a Soviet army onslaught that produces heavy Japanese casualties and the death of Kageyama. Forced to defend flat terrain with little fortification and a light armament, the Japanese troops are overrun by Soviet tanks, and many men are killed. Kaji survives the battle but is forced to kill a maddened Japanese soldier with his bare hands to prevent Soviet soldiers from discovering his position. The film ends with Kaji uttering "I'm a monster, but I'm going to stay alive!" and running and screaming in desperate search of any other Japanese survivors .

== Cast ==
- Tatsuya Nakadai as Kaji
- Michiyo Aratama as Michiko
- Keiji Sada as Second Lieutenant Kageyama
- Kokinji Katsura as Private 2nd class Sasa
- Jun Tatara as Warrant Officer Hino
- Michirō Minami as Senior Private Yoshida
- Kei Satō as PFC Shinjō
- Kunie Tanaka as Private 2nd class Obara
- Ryōhei Uchida as Sergeant Hashiya
- Shōbun Inoue as PFC Akahoshi
- Taketoshi Naitō as PFC Tange
- Yūsuke Kawazu as Private 2nd class Terada
- Susumu Fujita as Private 2nd class Naruto
- Minoru Chiaki as Corporal Onodera
- Shōji Yasui as apprentice officer
- Fumio Watanabe as staff officer
- Jun Hamamura as First Lieutenant Toi
- Akiji Kobayashi as Second Lieutenant Nonaka
- Hisashi Igawa as PFC Masui
