= Mainichi Film Award for Best Cinematography =

Annual Japanese film awards

- Awarded for: Best cinematography of the year
- Country: Japan
- First award: 1946

The Mainichi Film Award for Best Cinematography is a film award given at the Mainichi Film Awards.

Year	Cinematographer	Film
1946	Mikiya Tachibana	Hinoki Butai
1947	Mitsuo Miura	Ima Hitotabi no
1948	Takeo Itō	Drunken Angel
1949	Asakazu Nakai	Aoi sanmyaku Stray Dog
1950	Akira Mimura	Escape at Dawn
1951	Masao Tamai	Repast
1952	Kazuo Miyagawa	Nishijin no Shimai; Thousand Cranes
1953	Yoshio Miyajima	Before the Dawn; Kanikōsen
1954	Jōji Obara	Ai to Shi no Tanima; Niwatori wa Futatabi Naku
1955	Hiroshi Kusuda	She Was Like a Wild Chrysanthemum; Tōi Kumo
1956	Mitsuo Miura	The Legend of the White Serpent; Neko to Shōzō to Futari no Onna
1957	Hiroyuki Nagaoka	Kichigai Buraku; Seigiha
1958	Saburō Isayama	Hi no Ataru Sakamichi
1959	Yoshio Miyajima	The Human Condition
1960	Kazuo Miyagawa	Her Brother
1961	Yoshio Miyajima	A Soldier's Prayer
1962	Yūharu Atsuta	An Autumn Afternoon
1963	Tōichirō Narushima	Twin Sisters of Kyoto
1964	Shinsaku Himeda	Unholy Desire
1965	Yoshio Miyajima	Kwaidan
1966	Masahiko Iimura	Umi no Koto; Ichiman Sanzen-nin no Yōgisha
1967	Hiroshi Takemura	Sekishun; Portrait of Chieko
1968	Kiyomi Kuroda	Kuroneko; Tsuyomushi Onna to Yowamushi Otoko
1969	Kōzō Okazaki	Goyokin
1970	Asakazu Nakai	Akazukin Chan Ki o Tsukete
1971	Kōzō Okazaki	Inn of Evil
1972	Noritaka Sakamoto	The Rendezvous; Tabi no Omosa
1973	Noritaka Sakamoto	Tsugaru Jongara Bushi
1974	Kōzō Okazaki	Karei Naru Ichizoku; Nemu no Ki no Uta
1975	Kōzō Okazaki	Kaseki; I Am a Cat
1976	Kiyoshi Hasegawa	The Inugami Family
1977	Kazuo Miyagawa	Ballad of Orin
1978	Takashi Kawamata	The Incident; The Demon
1979	Setsuo Kobayashi	Nomugi Pass
1980	Kazue Nagatsuka	Zigeunerweisen
1981	Daisaku Kimura	Station
1982	Masaki Tamura	Farewell to the Land
1983	Akira Shiizuka	Antarctica
1984	Kazuo Miyagawa	MacArthur's Children
1985	Yonezō Maeda	Sorekara; Checkers in Tan Tan Tanuki; Yabanjin no Yō ni
1986	Yoshihiro Yamazaki	A Promise; Rikon Shinai Onna
1987	Yukio Isohata	Eiga Joyū
1988	Junichirō Hayashi	Wuthering Heights; Kyōshū
1989	Fujio Morita	Rikyu
1990	Takao Saito; Shōji Ueda	Dreams
1991	Tetsuo Takaha	My Sons
1992	Kōichi Kawakami	The River with No Bridge
1993	Takeshi Hamada	We Are Not Alone
1994	Naoki Kayano	800 Two Lap Runners
1995	Tatsuo Suzuki	Sharaku
1996	Osame Maruike	Sleeping Man
1997	Daisaku Kimura	Yūkai
1997	Masaki Tamura	Suzaku; 2/Duo
1998	Hideo Yamamoto	Hana-bi; The Bird People in China
1999	Yoshitaka Sakamoto	Jubaku: Spellbound
2000	Shōji Ueda	After the Rain
2001	Masakazu Fujisawa	Inugami; Turn; Koko ni Irukoto
2002	Mutsuo Naganuma	The Twilight Samurai
2003	Norimichi Kasamatsu	My House; Sayonara, Kuro; Akame 48 Waterfalls
2004	Kazuhiro Suzuki	Vibrator; Kikansha Sensei; Girlfriend; Kokoro to Karada
2005	Kōzō Shibasaki	Always Sanchōme no Yūhi
2006	Kōichi Kawakami	The Blossoming of Kamiya Etsuko
2007	Hideo Nakano	The Mourning Forest
2008	Tomohiko Tsuji	United Red Army
2009	Daisaku Kimura	Mt. Tsurugidake
2010	Ryūto Kondō	Sketches of Kaitan City
2011	Nobuyasu Kita	Hara-Kiri: Death of a Samurai
2012	Akiko Ashizawa	Chronicle of My Mother
2013	Takahiro Imai	The Backwater
2014	Shiguma Makoto	Pale Moon
2015	Masakazu Fujisawa	Solomon's Perjury
2016	Kōichi Saitō	64: Part I & 64: Part II
2017	Yōichi Kamakari	The Tokyo Night Sky Is Always the Densest Shade of Blue
2018	Yūta Tsukinaga	Mori, The Artist's Habitat
2019	Christopher Doyle	They Say Nothing Stays the Same
2020	Hiromitsu Nishimura	Underdog
2021	Norimichi Kasamatsu	Under the Open Sky
2022	Yūta Tsukinaga	Small, Slow But Steady
2023	Yōichi Kamakari	The Moon
2024	Naoya Ikeda	11 Rebels
2025	Sofian El Fani	Kokuho
