= Men and War =

1970–73 Japanese war film series

- Theatrical release poster for Part III
- 戦争と人間
- Directed by: Satsuo Yamamoto
- Screenplay by: Nobuo Yamada; Atsushi Takeda (II & III)
- Based on: Men and War by Junpei Gomikawa
- Cinematography: Shinsaku Himeda
- Music by: Masaru Sato
- Production company: Nikkatsu
- Distributed by: Dainichi Eihai (I); Nikkatsu
- Release dates: 14 August 1970 (I); 12 June 1971 (II); 11 August 1973 (III)
- Running time: 197 minutes (I); 179 minutes (II); 187 minutes (III)
- Country: Japan
- Languages: Japanese; Mandarin; Korean; Russian

Men and War (Japanese: 戦争と人間, Hepburn: Sensō to ningen) is a trilogy of epic war films directed by Satsuo Yamamoto, based on the novel of the same name by Junpei Gomikawa. The films are subtitled Prelude to Destiny (1970), Land of Love and Sorrow (1971), and The Final Chapter (1973). Part I was also released internationally under the title The Battle of Manchuria.

The trilogy follows the rise of the Godai family conglomerate and its involvement in the Second Sino-Japanese War, from the Jinan incident in 1928 to the Nomonhan incident in 1939. Yamamoto had conceived a five-part series, and the story was to continue through the Pacific War to the Tokyo Trials, but Nikkatsu reduced the series to a trilogy after the release of the second film for financial reasons.

== Synopsis ==
=== Part I ===
Shimegi Kohei's brother, suborbinate to an engineer at a factory owned by the upstart Godai zaibatsu, is arrested during the March 15 police raids. Kohei is adopted by the engineer and introduced to the Godai family. In the family salon, Yusuke Godai, the head of the family, confers with his eldest son Eisuke, and his brother Kyosuke, who has returned from Manchuria and established contacts in the Kwantung Army. The younger son Shunsuke befriends Kohei, who introduces him to Haiyama, a left-wing artist. The elder Godai sister, Yukiko, falls in love with Lieutenant Tsuge.

When the National Army of Chiang Kai-shek displace the forces of warlord Zhang Zuolin, Shigata Komijiro, an operative for the Godai company, provokes a clash between the Nationalists and the Japanese Army stationed at Jinan. An order to attack Zhang's army is expected from the Emperor, but it never arrives. Regardless, The Kwantung Army assassinates Zhang Zuolin. Takahata, also working for the Godai company, is abducted from a remote outpost by bandits, and offers to smuggle supplies to them in exchange for his freedom. During a communist guerrilla uprising, he is taken hostage by a band of Korean guerrillas led by Xu Zailin, whose family members were killed by the Japanese for their part in the Sam-il movement, but he is freed without ransom on the orders of the Communist Party. Takahata's arrangement is ended when a Japanese agent is spotted on one of his shipments, his post is destroyed, and his wife Motoko abducted. He traces his wife to the Korean guerrillas and pays them ransom, but he is told that she committed suicide after being raped.

Despite protests from the Japanese consulate, the Kwantung Army initiates the invasion of Manchuria. Kohei's brother, drafted into the army, is killed in an attack at Changchun. Tsuge leaves for Taiwan to take part in an investigation into the Musha incident but after criticizing colonial policy, he is also ordered to Manchuria.

=== Part II ===
After the invasion of Manchuria, the state of Manchukuo is formed by Japan. There is a struggle between the militarist Imperial Way Faction and Control Faction in the Japanese government, as well as a wave of political repression. Shunsuke is refused permission to see Haiyama, who has been imprisoned with other dissident artists, and begins meeting with Sato Atsuko, a married woman who had previously been set to marry Eisuke. Kohei, having left the Godai household behind, refuses the advances of Yoriko, the young Godai sister, and is later imprisoned for protesting the war.

The Godai company assists in Japanese encroachment into Hubei, but Yusuke, fearing the militarists will interfere with his business in Manchukuo, seeks assistance from Cho Daifuku, a wealthy comprador, but Cho refuses to hand over his mine. In Harbin, Tsuge, working for the Kempeitai, arrests Shigata for dealing in opium, but he is released due to his association with Godai. Takahata's guide Haku Eisho is outed as a spy of the communist guerrillas but Takahata aids in his escape, and is sent away by Godai so that he is not arrested by the Kempeitai. When Xu Zailin threatens to break from a Chinese guerrilla camp, Haku reads a party announcement that all people of China must stop fighting and unite to fight the Japanese. Xu still leaves to join the Korean resistance, but turns back and sacrifices his band to divert a Japanese column away from the camp.

The Control Faction is effectively destroyed in the February 26 incident. Disillusioned, Shunshuke moves to Manchuria after finishing school, in part to avoid seeing Atsuko, but he is confronted by Atsuko's husband Kano, who dares Shunsuke to have an affair. Atsuko arrives in Manchukuo and Shunsuke makes arrangements with Kyosuke to pay off Kano and elope with her as a Godai company employee. However, knowing Shunsuke will be harassed as long as they are together, Atsuko leaves voluntarily with her husband. Cho Daifuku is labelled an enemy of the state and his mine is confiscated. After the Xi'an incident, the Chinese form a united front against the Japanese and the full-scale war between China and Japan begins. Yuriko meets Tsuge, who is engaged to another woman but plans to make her wait until the war has finished.

=== Part III ===
The Godai family gather for Yuriko's marriage into the prosperous Amemiya family, headed by Koichiro Amemiya, head of the East Asia Bank. After Kohei receives his draft papers, Shunsuke forges a marriage certificate for Kohei and Yoriko. Yoriko admits to her father that she married Kohei and lived with him under the guise of a week-long trip, and is told to leave the household. Yusuke and Kyosuke are informed by Amemiya of an upcoming bill for general mobilization and concur that the government is preparing for war not only with China, but with the Soviet Union or United States.

Kohei and his fellow recruits are subject to abuse. When his unit is ordered to practice bayonet thrusts on Chinese prisoners, Kohei hesitates and is beaten unconscious by lance-corporal Taneda. While Kohei is still recovering, Taneda takes him on guard duty along a railway and confides that he would have been beaten more severely had he been properly punished for insubordination. Exempt from the draft, Shunsuke speaks openly in his office about the unlikelihood of Japan's victory. He is barred from publishing an essay on Manchurian labor conditions in an economic journal, but meets with the publisher Tajima, who understands the struggle of working under the Kempaitai. The two pool their data and make a report to a boardroom of Kwantung Army officers, which ends disastrously. They are both imprisoned by the Kempaitai, but Shunsuke is released shortly after. Taneda is killed on patrol, and Kohei's unit attacks a Chinese village, killing civilians indiscriminately. Again, Kohei refuses to kill and is beaten near to death by an officer. Chinese soldiers appear and repel the Japanese attackers. Yoriko, now a social worker, receives news of Kohei's death. However, when Kempaitai arrive to search her room for letters, she realizes that Kohei is still alive and has defected to the Chinese resistance.

Shunsuke is enlisted in the military against his will and placed under the command of Tsuge, now a major, who informs him that he will be stationed on the Soviet border. The Kwantung Army clashes with Soviet forces without orders, but the Minister of War does not intervene. The army launch a full-scale assault across the Khalkin Gol River, which ends in disaster, and Soviet advances also make no progress. The Japanese dig in, with dwindling supplies. The Soviet Army finally attacks, obliterating the Kwantung Army. Tsuge is killed. His unit destroyed, Shunsuke wanders aimlessly and comes across the wounded Haiyama, who he carries on his back. He is confronted by an officer riding in a sidecar who chastises him for retreating, but runs when Shunsuke threatens to shoot him. A ceasefire is signed. Surviving commanders are shown committing suicide or being ordered to commit suicide. War breaks out in Europe.

== Cast ==
- Osamu Takizawa as Yusuke Godai
- Shinsuke Ashida as Keisuke Godai
- Etsushi Takahashi as Eisuke Godai
- Kinya Kitaoji as Shunsuke Godai
  - Nakamura Kanzaburō XVIII as young Shunsuke Godai
- Ruriko Asaoka as Yukiko Godai
- Sayuri Yoshinaga as Yoriko Godai
  - Mari Sato as young Yoriko Godai
- Kei Yamamoto as Kohei Shimegi
  - Tsuguaki Yoshida as young Kohei Shimegi
- Mitsuko Mito as Otaki
- Hideki Takahashi as Shintaro Tsuge
- Rentaro Mikuni as Shigata Komijiro
- Koji Takahashi as Masanori Takanata
- Gaku Yamamoto as Haku Eisho
- Shinjirō Ehara as Haiyama
- Gō Katō as Tatsuo Hattori
- Kyōko Kishida as Sanko Otori
- Takeo Chii as Xu Zailin
- Komaki Kurihara as Cho Zuiho
- Shin Tatsuoka as Cho Daifuku
- Nobutada Iwasaki as Cho Ennen
- Yoshiko Sakuma as Atsuko Sato
- Ken Hatano as Takei Hiromichi
- Kazunaga Tsuji as Raita Oshio
  - Kazuhiro Fukuzaki as young Raita Oshio
- Masako Izumi as Kuni Umetani
  - Harumi Hirota as Kuni Umetani
- Zenji Yamada as Shokichi Umetani
- Kōji Nanbara as Shiro Jinnai
- Akira Yamanouchi as Kanji Ishihara
- Jūkei Fujioka as Seishirō Itagaki

=== Part I ===
- Yūjirō Ishihara as Shinozaki Ryoki
- Tetsurō Tamba as Bandit leader
- Shobun Inoue as Goro Araki
- Hideaki Nitani as Yatsugi Shofu
- Yasuko Sanjo as Yatsugi Ryoko
- Takahiro Tamura as Fuba Manabu
- Chieko Matsubara as Takahata Motoko
- Takao Ito as Takuro Shimegi
- Yoshiro Aoki as Major Segawa
- Masao Shimizu as Ichirai Zenba
- Masaaki Yana as Ichirai Shingo
- Ichiro Nakatani as Daisaku Komoto
- Genki Koyama as Commander Muraoka
- Yūsuke Takita as Morishima Morito
- Kyoichi Sato as Tadashi Hanaya
- Shōbun Inoue as Goro Araki
- Yasuyasu Umeno as Yamakawa

=== Part II ===
- Kō Nishimura as Ichiro Kano
- Natsue Kimura as Min-buk
- Michiko Yoshinaga as Togoshi Yuki
- Hisashi Igawa as Park
- Ulf Otsuki as Ivanov
- Isao Tamagawa as Saburo Aizawa
- Masaaki Maeda as Liang Ensheng
- Shin Saito as Shimazu

=== Part III ===
- Yoshi Katō as Koichiro Amemiya
- Junko Natsu as Toma
- Kamatari Fujiwara as Toma's father
- Fudeko Tanaka as Toma's mother
- Mizuho Suzuki as Shunichiro Tanaka
- Masafumi Sato as Shoichi Kojima
- Masahiro Yoshihara as Sato Kenryo
- Rinichi Yamamoto as Masanobu Tsuji

== Production ==
Satsuo Yamamoto had viewed the Vietnamese film Kim Đồng at the 1964 Afro-Asian Film Festival in Jakarta, as well as multiple documentaries produced by the Liberation Front, and subsequently acted as supervisor in the production of the documentary film Vietnam, shot by Japanese filmmakers on location from the perspective of the North Vietnam. In his autobiography, Yamamoto recalled that his experience of imperialist aggression against Vietnam made him embrace the goal of depicting Japanese imperialist aggression against China in the form of an adaptation of the novel Men and War by Junpei Gomikawa.

Men and War began production before the re-establishment of China-Japan relations in 1972. Consequently, the sequences of the film set in Northeast China were shot in Hokkaido and elaborate interior sets at Nikkatsu studios. The end of the third film, depicting the battle between the Japanese and Soviets at Nomonhan, was shot with the participation of Mosfilm on location in Volgograd, using several companies of soldiers and tanks from the Soviet Armed Forces.

Gomikawa had been displeased by the Chinese dialogue as spoken by Japanese actors in the adaptation of his novel The Human Condition and requested that Yamamoto not use the Chinese language at all in adapting Men and War, but the request was disregarded. Scenes of Mandarin Chinese dialogue in the film were often awkward or unintelligible to native speakers, as were scenes of Russian dialogue.

== Reception ==
Men and War Parts I and II were ranked among the top films of 1970 and 1971 respectively in Kinema Junpo. Part I was awarded the Mainichi Film Awards for Best Art Direction and Sound Recording and Yamamoto was awarded Best Director. The trilogy was praised in the Soviet Union for "the clarity of its conception, demonstrating not only the catastrophe of war but its ideology", but was denounced by Yao Wenyuan of the Gang of Four as "an extremely reactionary film that goes so far as to glorify fascists and aggressors".

== See also ==
- The Human Condition (film series)
- Political dissidence in the Empire of Japan
