= The Human Condition III: A Soldier's Prayer =

A Soldier's Prayer
- Theatrical release poster
- Directed by: Masaki Kobayashi
- Screenplay by: Masaki Kobayashi
- Story by: Junpei Gomikawa
- Based on: The Human Condition by Junpei Gomikawa
- Produced by: Shigeru Wakatsuki
- Starring: Tatsuya Nakadai
- Production companies: Ninjin Club; Shochiku
- Distributed by: Shochiku
- Release date: January 28, 1961
- Running time: 190 minutes
- Country: Japan
- Language: Japanese

A Soldier's Prayer (Japanese: 人間の條件 完結篇) is a 1961 Japanese film co-written and directed by Masaki Kobayashi. It is the third part of The Human Condition trilogy.

== Plot ==
The Japanese forces having been shattered during the events of the second film (Road to Eternity), Kaji and some comrades attempt to elude capture by Soviet forces and find the remnants of the Kwantung army in South Manchuria. Following the bayonetting of a Russian soldier, however, Kaji is increasingly sick of combat and decides to abandon any pretense of rejoining the army. Instead, he leads fellow soldiers and a growing number of civilian refugees as they attempt to flee the warzone and return to their homes. Lost in a dense forest, the Japanese begin to infight and eventually many die of hunger, poisonous mushrooms and suicide. Emerging from the forest on their last legs, Kaji and the refugees encounter regular Japanese army troops, who deny them food as if they were deserters. Carrying on further south, Kaji and his associates find a well-stocked farmhouse which is soon ambushed by Chinese peasant fighters. A prostitute to whom Kaji had shown kindness is killed by these partisans, and Kaji vows to fight them rather to escape. However, overpowered by these newly armed Chinese forces, Kaji and his fellow soldiers are nearly killed and are forced to run through a flaming wheat field to survive. Kaji then encounters a group of fifty Japanese army holdouts who are attempting to resume combat in alliance with Chiang Kai-shek, whom they believe will be supported by American forces, in a civil war against Russian-backed Communist Chinese. Kaji, a believer in pacifism and socialism, rejects this strategy as misguided and doomed to failure. Eventually, Kaji and a group of Japanese soldiers, whose number has grown to fifteen, fight through Russian patrols and find an encampment of women and old men who seek their protection. Kaji is driven to continue moving in search of his wife, but decides to surrender to Soviet forces when the encampment is besieged.

Captured by the Red Army and subjected to treatment that echoes the violence meted out to the Chinese in the first film, Kaji and his protégé Terada resist the Japanese officers who run their work camp in cooperation with Soviet forces. While such resistance amounts to no more than picking through the Russians' garbage for scraps of food and wearing gunnysacks to protect them from increasingly colder weather, Kaji is branded a saboteur and judged by a Soviet tribunal to harsh labor. With a corrupt translator and no other means of talking to the Russian officers with whom he feels ideological sympathies, Kaji becomes increasingly disillusioned by conditions in the camp and with Communist orthodoxy. When Terada is driven to exhaustion and death by harsh treatment from the collaborating officer Kirihara, Kaji decides to kill the man and then escape the camp alone. Still dreaming of finding his wife and abused as a worthless beggar and as a "Japanese devil" by the Chinese peasants of whom he begs mercy, Kaji eventually succumbs to the cold and dies in the vast winter wasteland covered in snow.

== Cast ==
- Tatsuya Nakadai as Kaji
- Kin Sugai
- Kyoko Kishida as Ryuko
- Yūsuke Kawazu as Terada
- Nobuo Kaneko
- Akira Yamauchi
- Michiyo Aratama as Michiko
- Chishū Ryū
- Hideko Takamine
- Tatsuya Ishiguro as Cave Captain

== Release ==
The film was released in 1961, while shown at various film festivals internationally. All-night marathons of the film were occasionally shown in Japan; screenings with Tatsuya Nakadai in attendance typically sold out. In 1999, Image Entertainment released A Soldier's Prayer (as well as the rest of the trilogy) on region 0 DVDs. These discs were noted for their poor image quality, cropped aspect ratio, lackluster sound, paraphrased English subtitle translation, and absence of extras. On September 8, 2009, The Criterion Collection released the film (again with the rest of the trilogy) with a brand new restoration, improved translation, a bonus disc with interviews, and a 12-page supplementary booklet. Arrow Video released a dual-format (Blu-ray and DVD) edition of the film and the rest of the trilogy in September 2016. The six-disc set includes an introduction and select scene commentary by film critic Philip Kemp, theatrical trailers, and a booklet with a new writing by David Desser.

== Awards ==
16th Mainichi Film Award

- Won: Best Film
