= Shigeru Wakatsuki =

Japanese film producer (died 1987)

- 若槻 繁
- Wakatsuki in 1963
- Born: Shigeru Yoneyama (米山 繁, Yoneyama Shigeru); 1914 or 1915; Niigata Prefecture, Empire of Japan
- Died: December 10, 1987 (aged 72–73)
- Other name: Shun Morishita
- Education: Chuo University
- Occupations: Film producer, journalist, reporter
- Years active: 1954–1978 (film)
- Title: Representative director and president of Ninjin Club
- Relatives: Keiko Kishi (cousin-in-law)

Shigeru Wakatsuki (若槻 繁, Wakatsuki Shigeru; 1914 or 1915 – December 10, 1987) was a Japanese film producer and journalist who served as the representative director and president of Ninjin Club. His film credits included the epic war trilogy The Human Condition (1959–1961), The Inheritance, Love Under the Crucifix (both 1962), Pale Flower, Kwaidan (both 1964), and Empire of Passion (1978). Wakatsuki also worked for several publications prior to his film career, and was arrested and tortured in 1944 as a suspected communist in connection with the Yokohama incident.

== Biography ==
Wakatsuki was born Shigeru Yoneyama (米山 繁, Yoneyama Shigeru) between 1914 and 1915 in Niigata Prefecture. As a student, he was involved in student activism and became interested in making a film adaptation after reading Kwaidan: Stories and Studies of Strange Things. After graduating from Chuo University, he worked as the editor-in-chief of several publications, including Kamakura Bunko and Chuokoron-Shinsha. During World War II, he was a reporter and journalist for Kaizō. He also wrote under the pen name Shun Morishita (森下 俊, Morishita Shun). On January 29, 1944, Wakatsuki and three of his colleagues at Kaizōsha were arrested by the Special Higher Police for printing communist essays. They suffered government oppression regarding free speech in what became known as the Yokohama incident. As a suspected communist, he was subsequently tortured by the Special Higher Police.

After the war, he worked as a journalist before transitoning to film in 1954, as the representative director and president of Ninjin Club, a company co-founded by his cousin-in-law, actress Keiko Kishi; Wakatsuki became a film producer in 1955. He attempted to fulfill his longtime dream of making Kwaidan: Stories and Studies of Strange Things into a film, eventually succeeding in 1964 after a decade of development hell, with Kwaidan. His other producing credits included the epic war trilogy The Human Condition (1959–1961), The Inheritance, Love Under the Crucifix (both 1962), and Pale Flower (1964); his final credit was for Empire of Passion (1978).

Wakatsuki died on December 10, 1987, at the age of 72 or 73.

== Filmography ==
=== Producer ===
- So Deep in My Heart (1955) [with Reiji Miwa] - debut
- Mune yori mune ni (1955)
- Rikidozan otoko no tamashi (1956)
- The Human Condition I: No Greater Love (1959)
- Road to Eternity (1959)
- Shiroi gake (1960)
- A Soldier's Prayer (1961)
- The Shrikes (1961)
- Hadakakko (1961)
- A Full Life (1962)
- The Inheritance (1962) [with Masaki Kobayashi]
- Love Under the Crucifix (1962)
- Tears on the Lion's Mane (1962)
- Pale Flower (1964) [with Masao Shirai]
- Kwaidan (1964)
- The Adolescents (La Fleur de l'âge, ou Les adolescentes) - 1964
- Waga toso (1968)
- Empire of Passion (1978)
