= Ogin-sama =

Fictional samurai novel

- Author: Tōkō Kon
- Original title: お吟さま (Ogin-sama)
- Language: Japanese
- Publisher: Tankosha
- Publication date: 1957
- Publication place: Japan
- Awards: Naoki Prize

Ogin-sama (お吟さま, Ogin-sama) is a jidaigeki novel written by Tōkō Kon and published in 1956. Kon won the Naoki Prize for the novel.

The novel deals with Sen no Rikyū's daughter Ogin and Takayama Ukon. The novel was adapted into film twice.

== Adaptation ==
- Love Under the Crucifix (1962), a Bungei pro production, directed by Kinuyo Tanaka. It stars Ineko Arima.
- Ogin-sama aka Love and Faith (1978), a Takarazuka Eiga production, directed by Kei Kumai and screenplay by Yoshikata Yoda. It stars Takashi Shimura.
