= Kwaidan (film) =

1964 Japanese horror anthology film by Masaki Kobayashi

- Theatrical release poster
- Directed by: Masaki Kobayashi
- Screenplay by: Yoko Mizuki
- Based on: Kwaidan: Stories and Studies of Strange Things and other stories by Yakumo Koizumi
- Produced by: Shigeru Wakatsuki
- Starring: Tatsuya Nakadai; Tetsurō Tamba; Yoichi Hayashi; Katsuo Nakamura; Rentarō Mikuni; Keiko Kishi; Misako Watanabe; Michiyo Aratama; Osamu Takizawa; Noboru Nakaya; Seiji Miyaguchi; Takashi Shimura; Yūko Mochizuki; Haruko Sugimura; Kan'emon Nakamura; Nakamura Ganjirō II
- Cinematography: Yoshio Miyajima
- Edited by: Hisashi Sagara
- Music by: Tōru Takemitsu
- Production company: Ninjin Club
- Distributed by: Toho
- Release dates: December 29, 1964 (Yurakuza); February 27, 1965 (Japan)
- Running time: 183 minutes
- Country: Japan
- Language: Japanese
- Budget: ¥318.7 million
- Box office: ¥225 million

Kwaidan (Japanese: 怪談, Hepburn: Kaidan; lit. 'Ghost Stories') is a 1964 Japanese horror anthology film directed by Masaki Kobayashi from a screenplay by Yoko Mizuki. It consists of four separate stories adapted from Lafcadio Hearn's collections of Japanese folktales, including two from his 1904 book Kwaidan: Stories and Studies of Strange Things, the film's namesake. Set mostly in feudal Japan, the segments feature vengeful spirits enforcing moral retribution, while portraying the supernatural realm as largely indifferent to human suffering. The cast includes Tatsuya Nakadai, Tetsurō Tamba, Yoichi Hayashi, Katsuo Nakamura, Rentarō Mikuni, and Keiko Kishi; no actors appear in more than one segment.

The concept of adapting Hearn's Kwaidan into a film originated with producer Shigeru Wakatsuki during his student years. Upon the formation of Ninjin Club's film production division, Wakatsuki pitched the idea to Kobayashi, who had once contemplated the same adaptation, prompting the project to advance. It subsequently languished in development hell for a decade; Shochiku initially planned to fund and distribute, but canceled. Toho then took over, accelerating progress. Principal photography began in March 1964, scheduled to end in July, but overran budget and schedule, wrapping in December.

Kwaidan premiered at the Yurakuza theater on December 29, 1964, followed by a roadshow theatrical release in Japan beginning January 6, 1965, and a wide release on February 27, 1965. Escalating production costs pushed the final budget to approximately ¥318–380 million, making it one of the most expensive Japanese films of its time. Despite ranking as the ninth-highest-grossing Japanese film release of 1965, Kwaidan earned only ¥225 million at the domestic box office, resulting in a substantial financial loss. Thus, it exacerbated debts for the film's production company Ninjin Club, leading to its bankruptcy shortly after release. Receiving critical acclaim, the film won the Special Jury Prize at the 1965 Cannes Film Festival, and received an Academy Award nomination for Best Foreign Language Film. It is now regarded as one of the greatest horror films and among the most visually beautiful films ever made.

== Plot ==
=== "The Black Hair" ===
An impoverished swordsman in Kyoto divorces his wife, a weaver, and leaves her for a woman from a wealthy family to attain greater social status. However, despite his new wealthy status, the swordsman's second marriage proves to be unhappy. His new wife is shown to be callous and selfish. The swordsman regrets leaving his more devoted and patient ex-wife.

The second wife is furious when she realizes that the swordsman not only married her to obtain her family's wealth, but also still longs for his old life in Kyoto. When he is told to go into the chambers to reconcile with her, the swordsman refuses, stating his intent to return home and reconcile with his former wife. He points out his foolish behavior and poverty as the reasons why he reacted the way he did. The swordsman informs his lady-in-waiting to tell his second wife that their marriage is over and she can return to her parents in shame.

After a few years, the swordsman returns to find his home, and his wife, largely unchanged. He reconciles with his ex-wife, who refuses to let him punish himself. She mentions that Kyoto has "changed" and that they only have "a moment" together, but does not elaborate further. She assures him that she understood that he only left her in order to bring income to their home. The two happily exchange wonderful stories about the past and the future until the swordsman falls asleep. He wakes up the following day only to discover that he had been sleeping next to his ex-wife's rotted corpse, the corpse also rapidly decays into a skeleton on the next appearance. Rapidly aging, the swordsman stumbles through the house, finding that it actually is in ruins and overgrown with weeds. He manages to escape, only to be attacked by his ex-wife's black hair.

=== "The Woman of the Snow" ===
Two woodcutters from Musashi Province, 18-year-old Minokichi and his elderly mentor Mosaku, take refuge in a boatman's hut during a snowstorm. Mosaku is killed by a yuki-onna- a "snow woman". When the yuki-onna turns to Minokichi, she sympathetically remarks that he is a handsome boy and spares him because of his youth, warning him never to mention what happened or she will kill him. Minokichi returns home and never mentions that night.

One day, while cutting wood, Minokichi meets Yuki, a beautiful young woman traveling at sunset. She tells him she lost her family and that she has relatives in Edo who can secure her a job as a lady-in-waiting. Minokichi offers to let her spend the night at his house with his mother. The mother takes a liking to Yuki and asks her to stay. She never leaves for Edo, and Minokichi falls in love with her. The two marry and have children, living happily. The older women in the town are in awe over Yuki maintaining her youth even after having three children.

One night, Minokichi gives Yuki a set of sandals he has made. When she asks why he always gives her red ribbons on her sandals, he tells her of her youthful appearance. Yuki accepts the sandals and tries them on. She is stitching a kimono in the candlelight. In the light, Minokichi recalls the yuki-onna and sees a resemblance between them. He tells her about the strange encounter. It is then that Yuki reveals herself to be the yuki-onna, and a snowstorm comes over the home. Even though he broke his word, she cannot bring herself to kill him because of her love for him and their children. Yuki then spares Minokichi and leaves on the condition that he treats their children well. As Yuki disappears into the snowstorm, a heartbroken Minokichi places her sandals outside in the snow. After he goes back inside, the snow covers the sandals, implying that Yuki took them with her.

=== "Hoichi the Earless" ===
Hoichi is a young blind musician who plays the biwa. His specialty is singing the chant of The Tale of the Heike about the Battle of Dan-no-ura fought between the Taira and Minamoto clans during the last phase of the Genpei War. Hoichi is an attendant at a temple and is looked after by the others there. One night he hears a sound and decides to play his instrument in the garden courtyard. A spectral samurai appears and tells him that his lord wishes to have a performance at his house. The samurai leads Hoichi to a mysterious and ancient court. Another attendant notices that he went missing for the night as his dinner was not touched. The samurai re-appears on the next night to take Hoichi and affirms that he has not told anyone. Afterwards, the priest asks Hoichi why he goes out at night but Hoichi will not tell him. One night, Hoichi leaves in a storm and his friends follow him and discover he has been going to a graveyard and reciting the Tale of Heike to the court of the dead Emperor. Hoichi informs the court that it takes many nights to chant the entire epic. They direct him to chant the final battle: the battle of Dan-no-ura. His friends drag him home as he refuses to leave before his performance is completed.

The priest tells Hoichi he is in great danger and that this was a vast illusion from the spirits of the dead, who plan to kill Hoichi if he obeys them again. Concerned for Hoichi's safety, a priest and his acolyte write the text of the Heart Sutra on his entire body including his face to make him invisible to the ghosts and instruct him to meditate. The ghostly samurai re-appears and calls out for Hoichi, who does not answer. Hoichi's ears are visible to the samurai as they forgot to write the text on his ears. The samurai, wanting to bring back as much of Hoichi as possible, rips his ears off to show his lord his commands have been obeyed.

The next morning, the priest and the attendants see a trail of blood leading from the temple. The priest and the acolyte realize their error and believe the ears were a trade for Hoichi's life. They believe the spirits will now leave him alone. A local lord arrives at the temple with a full retinue. They have heard the story of Hoichi the earless and wish to hear him play his biwa. Hoichi is brought before the lord and says he will play to console the sorrowful spirits. The narrator states that many wealthy nobles came to the temple with large gifts of money, making Hoichi a rich man.

=== "In a Cup of Tea" ===
Anticipating a visit from his publisher, a writer relates an old tale of an attendant of Lord Nakagawa Sadono named Kannai. While Lord Nakagawa is on his way to make a New Year's visit, he halts with his train at a teahouse in Hakusan. While the party is resting there, Kannai sees the face of a strange man in a cup of tea. Despite being perturbed, he drinks the cup.

Later, while Kannai is guarding his Lord, the man whose face appeared in the tea reappears, calling himself Heinai Shikibu. Kannai runs to tell the other attendants, but they laugh and tell him he is seeing things. Later that night at his own residence, Kannai is visited by three ghostly attendants of Heinai Shikibu. He duels them and is nearly defeated, but the author notes the tale ends before things are resolved. He suggests that he could write a complete ending, but prefers to leave the ending to the reader's imagination.

The publisher soon arrives and asks the Madame for the author, who is nowhere to be found. They both flee the scene in terror when they discover the author trapped inside a large jar of water.

== Cast ==
"The Black Hair"

- Rentarō Mikuni as the samurai
- Michiyo Aratama as the first wife
- Misako Watanabe as the second wife
- Kenjirō Ishiyama as the father
- Ranko Akagi as the mother
- Fumie Kitahara as the wet nurse
- Kappei Matsumoto as the manager
- Yoshiko Ieda as the maid
- Otome Tsukimiya as the caretaker
- Kenzo Tanaka as the servant
- Kiyoshi Nakano as the daimyo

"The Woman of the Snow"

- Tatsuya Nakadai as Minokichi
- Keiko Kishi as the yuki-onna
- Yūko Mochizuki as Minokichi's mother
- Kin Sugai as a village woman
- Noriko Sengoku as a village woman
- Akiko Nomura as a village woman
- Torahiko Hamada as the boatman
- Jun Hamamura as Mosaku

"Hoichi the Earless"

- Katsuo Nakamura as Hoichi the Earless
- Tetsurō Tamba as the samurai in armor
- Takashi Shimura as the chief priest
- Yoichi Hayashi as Minamoto no Yoshitsune
- Eiko Muramatsu as Kenreimon-in
- Kunie Tanaka as Yasaku, the fletcher
- Kazuo Kitamura as Taira no Tomomori
- Ichirō Nakatani as a nobleman
- Masanori Tomotake as Donkai
- Tokue Hanazawa as Matsuzo
- Shizue Natsukawa as Taira no Tokiko (Lady Nii)
- Shin Tatsuoka as Taira no Norimori
- Makiko Kitashiro as a noblewoman
- Shoichi Kuwayama as a fisherman
- Mutsuhiko Tsurumaru as Taira no Tsunemori
- Akira Tani as a fisherman
- Yousuke Kondou as Benkei
- Kiyoshi Yamamoto as Taira no Munemori
- Kinji Omino as Hideto Yamaga
- Atsuo Nakamura as Taira no Noritsune
- Ginzo Sekiguchi as a Genji warrior
- Akio Miyabe as Taro of Aki
- Gen'ya Nagai as a fisherman
- Toru Uchida as Kawano Michinobu
- Hikaru Kamino as Gen'ya Hirotsuna
- Toshio Fukuhara as a Genji warrior
- Kiro Abe as Satō Tadanobu
- Toshiro Yagi as Taira no Arimori
- Yuriko Abe
- Yuri Sato as Emperor Antoku
- Kyoichi Sato as Taira no Kagekiyo
- Nobuo Aikawa as Ise Yoshimori
- Taiji Kodama as Taira no Yukimori
- Nobuaki Maeda as Taira no Sukemori
- Teruhiko Shibata as Taira no Kiyomune
- Haruo Kaji as a warlord
- Michio Gina as Aki no Jiro
- Seiji Tabe as Aki no Jiro's servant
- Mitsuko Narita as a lady-in-waiting
- Noriko Mikura as a lady-in-waiting
- Aiko Nagayama as a lady-in-waiting
- Michiko Nakahata as a noblewoman
- Kyōko Kishida as a noblewoman (uncredited)

"In a Cup of Tea"

- Kan'emon Nakamura as Kannai, the samurai
- Osamu Takizawa as the author/narrator
- Haruko Sugimura as the landlady (the author's wife)
- Nakamura Ganjirō II as the publisher
- Noboru Nakaya as Heinai Shikibu
- Seiji Miyaguchi as the old man
- Kei Satō as Matsuoka Bungo, one of Heinai's retainers
- Tomoko Naraoka as Suzue, Kannai's younger sister
- Shigeru Kōyama as a co-worker of Kannai's
- Jun Tazaki as a co-worker of Kannai's
- Junkichi Orimoto as a co-worker of Kannai's
- Akiji Kobayashi as a co-worker of Kannai's
- Yoshiro Aoki as a co-worker of Kannai's
- Hideyo Amamoto as Dobashi Kyuzo, one of Heinai's retainers
- Isao Tamagawa as Okamura Heiroku, one of Heinai's retainers

== Production ==
=== Development and pre-production ===
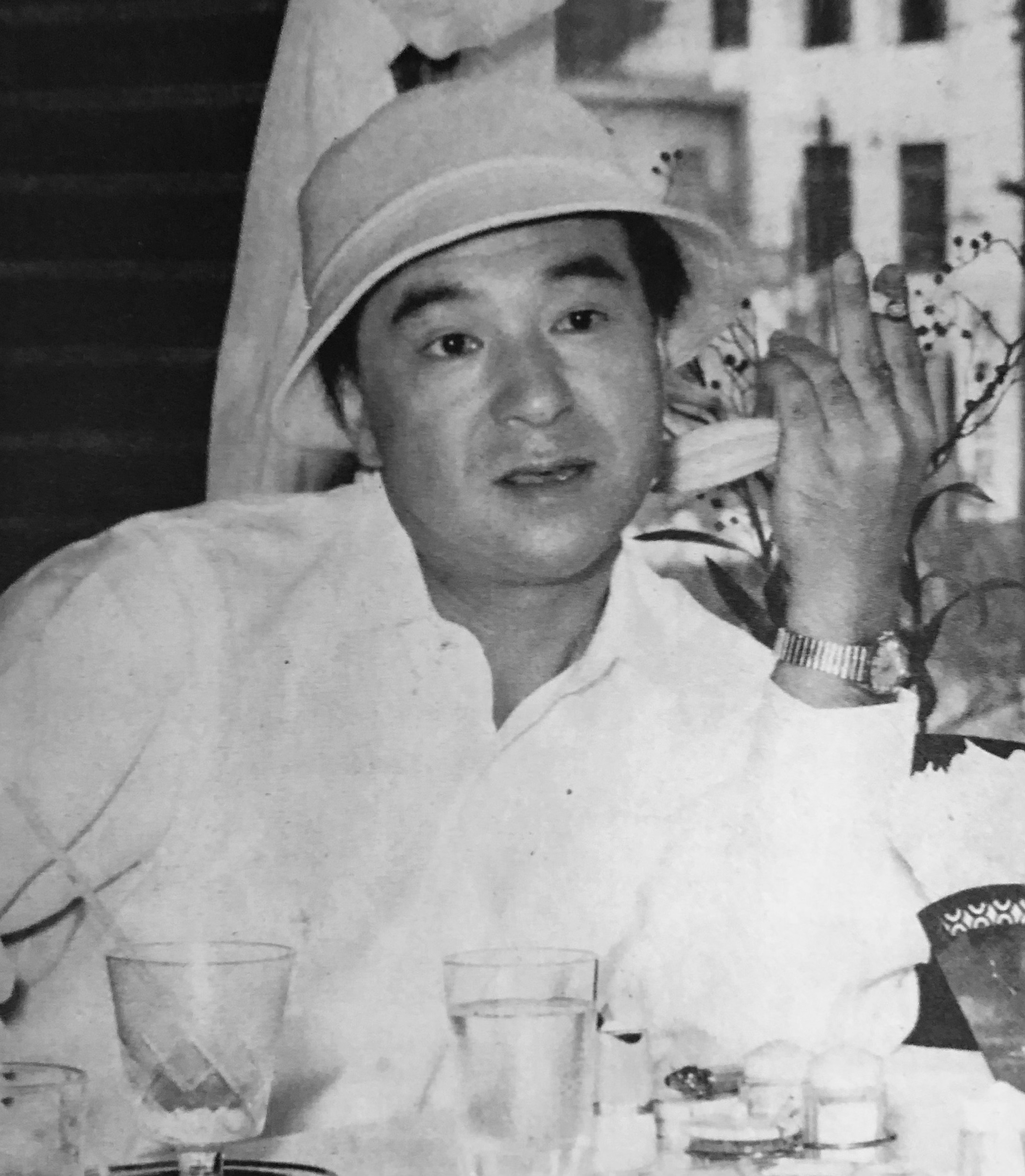
Director Masaki Kobayashi in 1960

While he was a student, producer Shigeru Wakatsuki, later the president of Ninjin Club, had the idea of a film adaptation of Lafcadio Hearn's Kwaidan: Stories and Studies of Strange Things. Upon the formation of Ninjin Club's film production division in 1954, Wakatsuki pitched an adaptation of Lafcadio Hearn's Kwaidan to director Masaki Kobayashi, who had also previously thought of adapting it. The project quickly gained momentum but soon languished in development hell for roughly a decade. Shochiku initially committed to funding and distribution but ultimately withdrew. Toho stepped in as partner and distributor, injecting the resources needed to push forward. Thus, Toho also began a three-film deal with director Masaki Kobayashi that concluded with the production of Kwaidan.

Screenwriter Yoko Mizuki made the decision herself of which four of Hearn's stories to adapt. The opening segment, "The Black Hair" (黒髪, Kurokami), is adapted from "The Reconciliation", which appeared in Hearn's collection Shadowings (1900); the second and third segments, "The Woman of the Snow" (雪女, Yukionna), and "Hoichi the Earless" (耳無し芳一の話, Miminashi Hōichi no Hanashi) are based on stories from Hearn's Kwaidan: Stories and Studies of Strange Things. The fourth and final segment, "In a Cup of Tea" (茶碗の中, Chawan no Naka), is adapted from Hearn's Kottō: Being Japanese Curios, with Sundry Cobwebs (1902).

Kobayashi pursued the project following the critical success of Harakiri (1962) at the Cannes Film Festival, where he decided to advance further in stylization on his next film. Kwaidan also served as a personal homage to his late teacher Aizu Yaichi, who had introduced Kobayashi to Hearn's writings.

During pre-production, Kobayashi discovered that the studio's sound stages were too small for the elaborate sets he envisioned. Therefore, he built the stages in an airplane hangar in Uji, Kyoto. Kobayashi worked with composer Toru Takemitsu for six months to produce the film's score. The film exhausted its budget three-quarters of the way through production, which led Kobayashi to sell his house.

Though known for hard-edged contemporary dramas, Kobayashi prioritized aesthetic reclamation with the film. During the 1930s–1940s, militarists had co-opted traditional arts for propaganda; Kwaidan sought to "reclaim the arts from this dark period", according to Stephen Prince.

=== Filming ===
Filming began on March 22, 1964. Nearly all scenes were shot on vast indoor soundstages converted from a former military barracks—ironic given Kobayashi's pacifism and wartime trauma (drafted 1941, Kwantung Army near Unit 731, brief POW detention). This enabled stylized, uncanny landscapes.

The film was one of the most expensive Japanese films ever at the time, with most money spent on the sets, nearly bankrupting Ninjin Club during filming; a loan from mentor Keisuke Kinoshita sustained it. The exact budget is disputed in reports, though it is generally agreed to have been over ¥300 million. Some sources list the budget as ¥320 million, while the film's trailer states it to have cost ¥350 million (US$970,000). According to Asaka Wakayama, widow of the film's composer, Tōru Takemitsu, the initial budget was ¥100 million with ¥2 million set to be spent on Takemitsu's music, escalating to ¥317 million for the film and ¥3.36 million for the score by the end of production. The Honolulu Star-Bulletin in September 1964 reported the budget as US$361,000, though filming was still ongoing at that time. Wakatsuki provided a detailed description of the costs in the March 1965 issue of Kinema Junpo, citing the exact production budget as ¥318,661,704 by January 20, 1965, excluding marketing. The film's theater program stated that the total cost was ¥380 million (just over $1 million) for the film. The New York Daily News claimed that the budget exceeded $1 million, adding that it was "peanuts for color and wide screen in Hollywood but the most expensive film ever made in Japan".

Cinematographer Yoshio Miyajima (a communist who made wartime propaganda before anti-militarist collaborations with Kobayashi) used fluid traveling shots, high-angle views (from Kobayashi's Otaru mountain climbs for solace, and 12th-century emakimono scrolls, explicitly cited in "Hoichi"), and oblique perspectives minimizing depth for two-dimensional surface design. Kobayashi rejected realism, honoring Zeami Motokiyo's Noh theory despising "appearance." Color (his first film in color) was theatrical—gelled lights, painted backdrops, translights. Sets emphasized artificiality; outdoor archery in "The Black Hair" used exaggerated reverberant hoofbeats.

=== Music and sound effects ===
Tōru Takemitsu composed the film's score and co-created its sound effects, both of which are considered revolutionary. This marked his third of ten collaborations with Kobayashi. Kobayashi said his films had "too much music" until Takemitsu, who parsed to essentials. Takemitsu, a self-taught composer known for blending Eastern and Western musical traditions, was drawn to film scoring due to the medium's inherent "eroticism" and "violence," which he believed grounded it in physical reality. Influenced by John Cage, Takemitsu used prepared piano (screws/bolts/wool), electronic alteration, and Japanese ma (charged silence). Sounds decoupled from visuals—creaking bamboo, ripping wood as metaphor, no ambient rustling.

== Thematic analysis ==
Kwaidan explores the uncanny (kaidan—Edo-period tales of strange encounters, not Western horror/morality). Central is mujō (transience)—life's brevity, inevitable decay, illusion of permanence. High angles evoke Buddha-like detachment; oblique compositions reference emakimono, flattening reality. Anti-militarism permeates subtly: angry ghosts unify episodes; eyes symbolize imperial surveillance ("thought police"); Heike suicide critiques ritualized death (echoing Harakiri); biwa reclaimed from wartime propaganda. Kobayashi, a pacifist conscript, saw war as "culmination of human evil." Sound and image experiment—decoupled audio, prepared piano, silence—point to a spiritual domain beyond empiricism, confounding perception to reveal "force behind surfaces."

Although Kwaidan is typically classified as a horror film, Kobayashi rejected this interpretation. In a 1975 interview with Joan Mellen, he called the horror label merely a "shorthand description" of the film. He emphasized his primary aim was to explore the opposition between humanity's material existence and the spiritual realm, including dreams and aspirations, and to focus on the profound spiritual meaning of life. He said he enjoyed portraying the beauty of traditional Japan, but was dissatisfied with the horror classification, maintaining that the film's essence lay in its spiritual concerns.

== Release ==
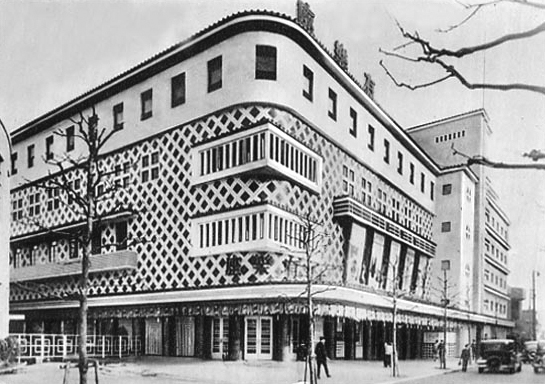
The Toho-operated Yurakuza theater (pictured c. 1930s) in Tokyo's Yūrakuchō district, where Kwaidan premiered in December 1964.

Kwaidan premiered at the Yurakuza, the most prestigious theater in central Tokyo, on December 29, 1964. The film opened in Japan as a roadshow theatrical release on 6 January 1965, distributed by Toho, with a simultaneous release in Taipei. The Japanese general wide release followed on February 27, 1965. To promote the film, stars Nakadai and Aratama visited Hearn's grave.

Despite high expectations, Kwaidan underperformed commercially in Japan. Toho had projected at least ¥100 million in roadshow revenue, and early reports from the Tokyo Scala Theater noted attendance comparable to The Miracle Worker and Mondo Cane (both 1962). The film ultimately earned ¥84.6 million during its Tokyo and Osaka roadshow engagements (January 6–February 12, 1965). Despite this, its roadshow release alone was reportedly considered a success, leading Toho to start a new roadshow policy with the 1965 remake of Akira Kurosawa's Sanshiro Sugata (1943). In total, domestic rentals reached ¥225 million, placing it ninth among Japanese-produced films released in 1965. With its final cost—including marketing—of ¥380 million, the film failed to break even. This shortfall, in turn, contributed heavily to the financial collapse of its production company, Ninjin Club, which declared bankruptcy shortly after release.

A 161-minute version screened in competition at the 1965 Cannes Film Festival, with Kobayashi and Takemitsu in attendance, giving them a sense of relief and accomplishment after the arduous production. Upon returning from Cannes, Kobayashi was promptly dismissed by Shochiku president Kido Shiro, who had begun to dislike Kobayashi and attributed the decision to the film's excessive costs. This ended Kobayashi's longstanding relationship with Shochiku and marked his transition to a more independent, "lone wolf" career.

Kwaidan then became one of the most popular and acclaimed foreign films ever released in the United States, according to The Union. The film was released in the U.S. on 15 July 1965 by Continental Distributing in a 125-minute version that omitted the entire "The Woman of the Snow" segment after its Los Angeles premiere, reportedly with Kobayashi's approval. A screening of Kwaidan was arranged for Princess Grace Kelly around November 1965 at her request. The film, with all Its four segments intact, was also shown at Toho's La Brea Theatre in Los Angeles in July 1965; and in San Francisco from November 29-December 1, 1970.

Some contemporary sources claim that the excised "Woman of the Snow" segment was later released overseas as a standalone short subject. However, film historian Stuart Galbraith IV found no evidence of a standalone theatrical release in the United States or elsewhere. Nevertheless, there are indications of its exhibition in England. The British Board of Film Classification gave an A rating to a 36-minute film titled "The Woman of the Snow" on December 10, 1967, listing Orb Films Ltd. as distributor; this company also handled the UK releases of Matango (1963) and Onibaba (1964). In October 1968, according to a listing and review, "The Woman of the Snow" was screened alongside The Dress (1964) at the Academy 1-2-3 in London. The segment was subsequently shown in Derby with Onibaba in January 1969, and in June 1969 at the Electric Cinema Club in June 1969 alongside several other short films.

Kwaidan was re-released theatrically in Japan on November 29, 1982, as part of Toho's fiftieth anniversary. For several decades the original 183-minute Japanese cut was believed lost, and home-video releases (including laserdisc and early DVDs) were sourced from the 161-minute Cannes print. Toho later rediscovered the 183-minute cut and released it on DVD in 2003.

== Reception ==
=== Critical response ===
Japanese critics considered Kwaidan one of the best Japanese films of 1964 or 1965, but the latter year was mostly disregarded, as the film premiered in 1964 and was thus considered a 1964 film; only a few votes in a 1965 survey of Japanese film critics mentioned it as such. Kinema Junpo ranked it the second best Japanese film of 1964, after Woman in the Dunes, and The Japan Times placed it sixth. Yoko Mizuki also won the Kinema Junpo award for Best Screenplay. It also won awards for Best Cinematography and Best Art Direction at the Mainichi Film Concours. The film won international awards, including Special Jury Prize at the Cannes Film Festival and was nominated for the Best Foreign Language Film at the Academy Awards. Despite its success at Cannes, its initial reception there was reportedly mixed. To meet international distribution demands, the film underwent significant running-time edits following its initial Japanese premiere. While the original Japanese roadshow version ran 182 minutes and the Japanese general release ran 163 minutes, American distributor Continental Distributing re-edited the film down to 125 minutes following its Los Angeles premiere by entirely removing "The Woman of the Snow" segment. Despite being omitted from initial Western theatrical prints, "The Woman of the Snow" was reinstated in subsequent reissues and home video releases, where it received widespread acclaim as one of the film's standout episodes. It also remains the only horror movie ever to be nominated for the Academy Award for Best Foreign Language Film.

In a 1967 review, the Monthly Film Bulletin commented on the use of colors in the film, stating that "it is not so much that the colour in Kwaidan is ravishing...as the way Kobayashi uses it to give these stories something of the quality of a legend." The review concluded that the Kwaidan was a film "whose details stay on in the mind long after one has seen it." Bosley Crowther, in a 1965 New York Times review, stated that director Kobayashi "merits excited acclaim for his distinctly oriental cinematic artistry. So do the many designers and cameramen who worked with him. Kwaidan is a symphony of color and sound that is truly past compare." Furthermore, Crowther singled out Katsuo Nakamura's performance as the "most conspicuous and memorable." He later listed it among the Top 10 films released in 1965 and recognized Katsuo's performance as one of the best in a film of that year. Variety described the film as "done in measured cadence and intense feeling" and that it was "a visually impressive tour-de-force."

=== Accolades ===
Award	Date of ceremony	Category	Recipient(s)	Result	Ref.
Academy Awards	April 18, 1966	Best Foreign Language Film	Kwaidan (Japan)	Nominated	
Cannes Film Festival	May 1965	Special Jury Prize	Kwaidan	Won	
International Film Awards	January 21, 1966	Joseph Burstyn Award	Kwaidan	Nominated	
Japan Film Technical Awards	1965	Best Lighting	Akira Aomatsu	Won	
Kinema Junpo	March 1965	Best Japanese Films of 1964	Kwaidan	2nd Place	
Kinema Junpo	March 1965	Best Screenplay	Yoko Mizuki	Won	
Mainichi Film Awards	1965	Best Cinematography	Yoshio Miyajima	Won	
Mainichi Film Awards	1965	Best Art Direction	Shigemasa Toda	Won	
New York Film Critics Circle	January 29, 1966	Best Foreign Language Film	Kwaidan	Runner-up	

== Legacy ==
=== Modern reception ===
Kwaidan is now considered one of the greatest horror films and among the "most beautiful" movies of all time. On the review aggregator website Rotten Tomatoes, 91% of 46 critics' reviews are positive, with an average rating of 7.9/10. The website's consensus reads: "Exquisitely designed and fastidiously ornate, Masaki Kobayashi's ambitious anthology operates less as a frightening example of horror and more as a meditative tribute to Japanese folklore."

Though he never wrote a dedicated review of Kwaidan, Roger Ebert frequently expressed high admiration for the film, describing it in his 2012 Great Movies essay on Harakiri as "an assembly of ghost stories that is among the most beautiful films I've seen." He also called it one of the greatest films of all time when mentioning films featuring Takashi Shimura, and often highlighted its deliberate use of artificial studio sets and painted backdrops, citing it favorably in reviews of films such as The Night of the Hunter (1955), The Scent of Green Papaya (1993), and Fear(s) of the Dark (2007).

Philip Kemp wrote in Sight & Sound that Kwaidan was "almost too beautiful to be scary" and that "each tale sustains its own individual mood; but all are unforgettably, hauntingly beautiful." /Film called it "one of the absolute high points of the Japanese New Wave".

=== Cultural influence ===
The film has been noted for its significant influence. Several filmmakers have spoken of their appreciation for Kwaidan or cited its influence on their own work, including Guillermo del Toro, John Milius, Ari Aster, Peter Greenaway, Clive Barker, Marco Brambilla, Amir Naderi, Bill Hader, John Landis, and Wang Toon. In addition, Hideo Kojima, Jack Reynor, Kate and Laura Mulleavy, Zola Jesus, Scott Morse, Barnaby Clay, Rodrigo Prieto, Tracy Letts, Nicolas Winding Refn, Bruce Wagner, and Ernest Dickerson have mentioned it among their favorite films. Films specifically inspired by Kwaidan include Conan the Barbarian (1982), Mishima: A Life in Four Chapters (1985), Bram Stoker's Dracula (1992), Bedevil (1993), The Pillow Book (1996), Bedeviled (2016), Aamis, Bainne (both 2019), A Haunting in Venice (2023), and The Legend of Ochi (2025), as well as The Ring, Ju-On, and Tomie film franchises. The film is credited with establishing the long, black-haired ghost as a recurring motif in contemporary Japanese horror cinema. It also had a major impact on Taiwanese horror cinema.

The episode "The Curse of Frank Black" of Millennium was also inspired by the film. Joel Rose cited it as an influence on his and Anthony Bourdain's graphic novel Hungry Ghosts. Postman Blues (1997) and The Terror: Infamy pay homage to Kwaidan. Mike Patton of Faith No More selected Kwaidan's soundtrack as one of his favorite horror scores. Theatre director Ping Chong cited the film as inspiring his adaptation of Hearn's Kwaidan for the stage.

The "Woman of the Snow" segment from the film was remade as the final story, "Lover's Vow", in the 1990 horror anthology Tales from the Darkside: The Movie. This made Kwaidan the first Japanese horror film to be remade in the United States.

Stephen Prince suggests that the giant cosmic eyes in the skies of "The Woman of the Snow" episode influenced Akira Kurosawa's depiction of the Nagasaki atomic bombing in Rhapsody in August (1991), where a massive eye opens in the sky as a surreal representation of the blast.

In 2024, filmmaker Quan Zhang released the video essay kwAIdan for the academic journal MAI: Feminism & Visual Culture, reinterpreting the film's "Black Hair" segment using AI-generated female figures to explore guilt, subvert female madness tropes, and critique AI objectification of women. Two reviewers in Sight and Sound praised it as a standout AI reworking and one of 2024's best video essays.

The Asian-owned luxury womenswear fashion label Kwaidan Editions is named after the film.

== See also ==
- List of ghost films
- Kuroneko – a 1968 Japanese horror film with similar plot elements
- List of submissions to the 38th Academy Awards for Best Foreign Language Film
- List of Japanese submissions for the Academy Award for Best Foreign Language Film

== Works cited ==
- Barrett, Michael S. (2018). Foreign Language Films and the Oscar: The Nominees and Winners, 1948-2017. McFarland. p. 45. ISBN 978-1476674209.
- Barrin, Arnold (July 19, 1965). "Kwaidan: Noteworthy Film at Toho La Brea". Citizen-News. p. 10.
- Derry, Charles (November 2009). Dark Dreams 2.0: A Psychological History of the Modern Horror Film from the 1950s to the 21st Century. McFarland & Company. pp. 284–285. ISBN 9780786433971.
- Eswaran, Swarnavel (2021). "Kobayashi's Kwaidan: Horror, History, and Culture". Mise-en-scène: The Journal of Film & Visual Narration. 6 (2). ISSN 2369-5056.
- Galbraith IV, Stuart (1994). Japanese Science Fiction, Fantasy and Horror Films. McFarland. ISBN 0-89950-853-7.
- Galbraith IV, Stuart (2008). The Toho Studios Story: A History and Complete Filmography. Scarecrow Press. ISBN 978-1461673743.
- Gima, Dick (September 26, 1964). "Japanese Entertainment News Briefs". Honolulu Star-Bulletin. p. 9 – via Newspapers.com.
- Gima, Dick (January 16, 1965). "Japanese Entertainment News Briefs". Honolulu Star-Bulletin. p. 9 – via Newspapers.com.
- Gima, Dick (March 13, 1965). "Japanese Entertainment News Briefs". Honolulu Star-Bulletin. p. 9 – via Newspapers.com.
- Gima, Dick (May 29, 1965). "Japanese Entertainment News Briefs". Honolulu Star-Bulletin. p. 13 – via Newspapers.com.
- Hale, Wanda (November 23, 1965). "Kwaidan, a Beautiful Japanese Color Film". New York Daily News. p. 57 – via Newspapers.com.
- Hoshino, Tomoyuki (2012). We, the Children of Cats. Found in Translation. Translated by Bergstrom, Brian. PM Press. p. 224. ISBN 978-1-60486-591-2.
- Huang, Ren (2008). 日本電影在臺灣 [Japanese Movies in Taiwan] (in Chinese). 秀威出版. p. 111. ISBN 978-986-221-120-5 – via Google Books.
- Imamura, Shōhei (1987). 日本映画の模索 [Searching for Japanese Cinema] (in Japanese). Iwanami Shoten. ISBN 978-4000102568.
- Kemp, Phillip (2020). "Kwaidan". Sight & Sound. Vol. 30, no. 6.
- Lévesque, François [in French] (January 11, 2016). "Kwaïdan, de Masaki Kobayashi". Le Devoir (in French). p. 15 – via Newspapers.com.
- Malina, Martin (February 3, 1969). "Vampires, cannibals spice Japanese films". The Montreal Star. p. 33.
- Mellen, Joan (1975). Voices from the Japanese Cinema. Liveright Publishing Corporation. p. 148. ISBN 978-0-87140-604-0.
- Motoyama, Sho; Matsunomoto, Kazuhiro; Asai, Kazuyasu; Suzuki, Nobutaka; Kato, Masashi (September 28, 2012). Toho Special Effects Movie Complete Works (in Japanese). villagebooks. ISBN 978-4864910132.
- Newman, Kim (2011). Nightmare Movies: Horror on Screen Since the 1960s. A&C Black. p. 445. ISBN 978-1-4088-0503-9.
- Nikaido, Takuya [in Japanese] (February 5, 2020). 日本映画裏返史 [The Inside-Out History of Japanese Cinema] (in Japanese). Sairyūsha. p. 35. ISBN 9784779151835.
- Prince, Stephen (November 16, 2017). A Dream of Resistance: The Cinema of Kobayashi Masaki. Rutgers University Press. ISBN 978-0-8135-9235-0.
- Prince, Stephen (2015). Kwaidan Audio Commentary (Blu-ray). The Criterion Collection.
- Takemitsu, Asaka (2006). 作曲家・武満徹との日々を語る [Talking about My Days with Composer Tōru Takemitsu]. Shogakukan. p. 101. ISBN 9784093876131.
- Thomas, Kevin (July 20, 1965). "Kwaidan, Supernatural Tales Told in Superlative Way". Los Angeles Times. p. 49.
- 怪談 [Kwaidan] (theater program) (in Japanese). Toho. January 1965. Archived from the original on 21 June 2023.
- "特集レポート 独立プロ 〈その現実と大企業との関係〉 「怪談」製作白書序説" [Special Report on Independent Productions: Their Reality and Relationship with Large Corporations - Introduction to the Kwaidan Production White Paper]. Kinema Junpo (in Japanese). Vol. 1202, no. 387. March 1965. p. 19.
- 『東宝特撮映画DVDコレクション』第61号 [Toho Special Effects Movie DVD Collection No. 61] (in Japanese). De Agostini. 2012. p. 12. Archived from the original on 10 November 2025.
- "Issues 1-6". Engekikai. Vol. 23. 1965. p. 72 – via Google Books.
- "Japanese film depicts 4 tales of spirit world". The Union. November 5, 1982. p. 8 – via Newspapers.com.
- "Honolulu and Other Hawaiian Areas". Boxoffice. August 9, 1965. p. W-7 – via Yumpu.com.
- "Academy Cinema Two". Evening Standard. October 11, 1968. p. 18.
- "Kinema Junpo Best Ten 85th Complete History 1924-2011". Kinema Junpo (in Japanese). May 17, 2012. ISBN 9784873767550.
- "Classics of the Japanese Film". San Francisco Chronicle. October 25, 1970. p. 233 – via Newspapers.com.
- "Japan's Ten Best Films of 1965". Film Society Review. 1966. p. 6 – via Google Books.
- "Olympic Film..." Guam Daily News. May 21, 1965. p. 14 – via Newspapers.com.
- D.W. (1967). "Kwaidan". Monthly Film Bulletin. Vol. 34, no. 396. London: British Film Institute. pp. 135–136.
- "IFIDA Sets Nominations For Annual Awards Jan. 21". Boxoffice. January 24, 1966. p. SE-7 – via Yumpu.com.
