= Love Under the Crucifix =

1962 Japanese film

- Film poster
- Directed by: Kinuyo Tanaka
- Screenplay by: Masashige Narusawa
- Based on: Ogin-sama; by Tōkō Kon
- Produced by: Sennosuke Tsukimori; Shigeru Wakatsuki
- Starring: Ineko Arima; Tatsuya Nakadai; Nakamura Ganjirō II; Mieko Takamine; Osamu Takizawa; Keiko Kishi
- Cinematography: Yoshio Miyajima
- Edited by: Hisashi Sagara
- Music by: Hikaru Hayashi
- Production companies: Ninjin Club; Shochiku (Note: According to the Kinema Junpo and Tanaka Kinuyo Memorial Association websites, Love Under the Crucifix was produced by Bungei Production Ninjin Club in conjunction with Shochiku studios, while the Japanese Movie Database and the National Film Archive of Japan list Shochiku solely as distributor. Tanaka biographer Irene Gonzalez-Lopez writes that the film was produced by Bungei Production Ninjin Club alone, planned by former Shochiku employee Hisako Nagashima.)
- Distributed by: Shochiku
- Release date: 3 June 1962 (Japan)
- Running time: 101 minutes
- Country: Japan
- Language: Japanese

Love Under the Crucifix (Japanese: お吟さま, Hepburn: Ogin-sama; lit. "Lady Ogin") is a 1962 Japanese historical drama film directed by Kinuyo Tanaka, based on Tōkō Kon's novel Ogin-sama. It was the last film Tanaka directed.

== Plot ==
Set in late 16th century Japan, the film tells the tragic love story between Ogin, daughter of tea ceremony master Sen no Rikyū, and Christian daimyō Takayama Ukon. Friends since their childhood days, Ukon first introduced her to the Christian faith when she was sixteen. During Ukon's visit to her father's house, Ogin confesses her feelings for him, but his marriage makes it impossible to return them. Soon afterwards, merchant Shintaro of the powerful local Mozuya family proposes to Ogin. Because her mother reminds her that refusing the proposal might result in consequences for her father, and Ukon does not show any sign of opposition, Ogin reluctantly accepts.

Two years later. Ogin's husband Shintaro blames her for still loving Ukon while rejecting his own advances. Due to the government's increasingly Anti-Christian politics, Ukon, who refuses to renounce his faith, is sent into exile. Ogin and Shintaro meet him one last time before his departure, because Shintaro secretly wants to maintain business with Ukon. After bidding him farewell, Ogin witnesses a young woman taken to her execution for refusing to become daimyō Hidetsugu's mistress. The young woman shows no sign of fear but rather fulfilment for having followed her own heart.

During a tea ceremony at the residence of daimyō Hideyoshi, Shintaro is approached by military commander Ishida. Ishida wants to prevent Ukon's rehabilitation and participation in a planned military campaign and proposes a meeting between Ogin and Ukon which could be used to prosecute both. Ogin and Ukon are tricked into the meeting, but manage to escape before they can be arrested. While taking shelter in a farmer's hut, Ogin learns that Ukon's wife has died in the meantime, and they spend the night together. Upon her return to Shintaro, she asks for a divorce.

Hideyoshi, intent on making Ogin his mistress, invites her to his palace. When she refuses his advances, he gives her two days to reconsider, declaring that otherwise he will claim her father's life. After her return to her family, Rikyū makes preparations to help Ogin escape to Ukon and commit suicide himself, but the house has already been surrounded by soldiers. Ogin makes preparations to take her own life, ordering her maid to take a fan with her farewell note written on it to Ukon who has taken refuge in Kaga.

== Cast ==
- Ineko Arima as Ogin
- Tatsuya Nakadai as Takayama Ukon
- Mieko Takamine as Riki
- Masakazu Tamura as Ogin's younger brother
- Minoru Chiaki
- Ryūji Kita
- Kuniko Miyake
- Tatsuo Endō
- Yoshi Katō
- Ryosuke Kagawa
- Manami Fuji as Uno
- Yumeji Tsukioka as Lady Yodo
- Kōji Nanbara as Ishida Mitsunari
- Chishū Ryū as Sokei
- Nakamura Ganjirō II as Sen no Rikyū
- Osamu Takizawa as Toyotomi Hideyoshi
- Keiko Kishi as prosecuted woman
- Hisaya Itō as Mozuya Soan

== Legacy ==
A 4K restored version of the film was presented at the Tokyo International Film Festival in 2021, at Film at Lincoln Center in 2022 and at the Harvard Film Archive in 2023.

Tōkō Kon's novel was again adapted for the 1978 film Love and Faith, directed by Kei Kumai.
