= The Human Condition (film series) =

1959–1961 trilogy of films by Masaki Kobayashi

- Criterion Collection DVD cover art
- Directed by: Masaki Kobayashi
- Screenplay by: Masaki Kobayashi; Zenzo Matsuyama (all parts); Koichi Inagaki (III only)
- Based on: The Human Condition by Junpei Gomikawa
- Produced by: Shigeru Wakatsuki (all parts); Masaki Kobayashi (II and III only)
- Starring: Tatsuya Nakadai; Michiyo Aratama
- Cinematography: Yoshio Miyajima
- Edited by: Keiichi Uraoka
- Music by: Chuji Kinoshita
- Production company: Ninjin Club
- Distributed by: Shochiku
- Release dates: 15 January 1959 (I); 20 November 1959 (II); 28 January 1961 (III)
- Running time: 579 minutes (all parts); 208 minutes (I); 181 minutes (II); 190 minutes (III)
- Country: Japan
- Languages: Japanese; Mandarin; Russian
- Budget: >¥300 million (all parts)
- Box office: Japan rentals: ¥304.04 million (I) ¥234.79 million (II)

The Human Condition (Japanese: 人間の條件, Hepburn: Ningen no Jōken) is a trilogy of Japanese epic war drama films co-written and directed by Masaki Kobayashi, based on the novel of the same name by Junpei Gomikawa. The films are subtitled No Greater Love (1959), Road to Eternity (1959), and A Soldier's Prayer (1961).

Starring Tatsuya Nakadai in his first major leading role as Japanese pacifist and socialist Kaji, the trilogy follows his journey through the totalitarian and oppressive world of World War II-era Japan and Manchukuo. Kaji begins as a labor camp supervisor seeking to implement more humane treatment of Chinese prisoners, is later conscripted into the Imperial Japanese Army, and ultimately becomes a prisoner of war. Constantly trying to uphold his ideals in a corrupt system, he repeatedly finds his morals an impediment rather than an advantage. Michiyo Aratama co-stars as his wife, Michiko.

Shot back-to-back, the trilogy was a massive undertaking with a then-staggering budget of over ¥300 million. It took approximately three years to produce and involved over 20,000 actors. Each film is divided into two parts, with the trilogy having six parts altogether and a combined running time of 579 minutes (approximately 9 hours and 39 minutes), making it one of the longest narrative films ever made.

Released by Shochiku between 1959 and 1961, the trilogy was controversial in Japan at the time for its critical portrayal of Japanese militarism and wartime conduct, yet it received critical acclaim, won several international awards (including prizes at the Venice Film Festival), and established Kobayashi as one of the most important Japanese directors of his generation. It has since been widely regarded as a monumental anti-war epic and a landmark of Japanese and world cinema.

== Plot summaries ==
The Criterion Collection website summarises the plot of the film thus: "The Human Condition follows the journey of the well-intentioned, yet naïve Kaji who transitions from being a labor camp supervisor to an Imperial Army soldier and eventually Soviet POW. Constantly trying to rise above a corrupt system, Kaji time and time again finds his morals an impediment rather than an advantage."

=== No Greater Love (1959) ===
In World War II-era Japan, Kaji marries his sweetheart Michiko despite his misgivings about the future. To gain exemption from military service, he moves his wife to a large mining operation in Manchukuo, a Japanese puppet state, where he serves as a labor chief assigned to a workforce of Chinese prisoners.

Kaji aggravates the camp bureaucracy by implementing humane practices to improve both labor conditions and productivity, clashing with foremen, administrators, and the Kenpeitai military police. Ultimately his efforts to grant autonomy to the POWs are undermined by scheming officials, resulting in the electrocution of several prisoners and the beheading of others accused of attempted escape. When Kaji protests the brutality, he is tortured and then drafted into the army to relieve the camp supervisors of his disruptive presence.

=== Road to Eternity (1959) ===
Kaji, having lost his exemption from military service by protecting Chinese prisoners from unjust punishment, has now been conscripted into the Japanese Kwantung Army. Under suspicion of leftist sympathies, Kaji is assigned the toughest duties in his military recruiting class despite his excellent marksmanship and strong barracks discipline. His wife Michiko pleads for understanding in a letter to his commanding officer and later pays Kaji a highly unorthodox visit to his military facility to express her love and solidarity. Kaji considers escaping across the front with his friend Shinjo, who is similarly under suspicion due to his brother's arrest for communist activities. Distrusting the idea that desertion will lead to freedom, and being faithful to his wife, Kaji ultimately commits to continued military service despite his hardships.

When Obara, a poor-sighted, weak soldier in Kaji's unit, kills himself after troubles from home are compounded by ceaseless punishment and humiliation from other soldiers, Kaji demands disciplinary action from his superiors for PFC Yoshida, the ring leader of the troops who pushed Obara over the brink. While Yoshida is not disciplined, Kaji helps to seal his fate by refusing to rescue the vicious soldier when both men are trapped in quicksand while in pursuit of Shinjo, who finally seized the opportunity to desert. Kaji is released from hospitalization related to the quicksand incident and is transported to the front with his unit.

Kaji is asked to lead a group of recruits and promoted to private first class. He accepts his assignment with the condition that his men will be separated from a group of veteran artillerymen, who practice intense cruelty as punishment for the slightest offenses. Often taking the punishment for his men, Kaji is personally beaten many times by these veterans, despite his relationship with Second Lieutenant Kageyama. Demoralized by the fall of Okinawa and continually battling with the veterans, Kaji and most of his men are sent on a month-long trench digging work detail. Their work is interrupted by a Soviet army onslaught that produces heavy Japanese casualties and the death of Kageyama. Forced to defend flat terrain with little fortification and a light armament, the Japanese troops are overrun by Soviet tanks, and many men are killed. Kaji survives the battle but is forced to kill a maddened Japanese soldier with his bare hands to prevent Soviet soldiers from discovering his position. The film ends with Kaji uttering "I'm a monster, but I'm going to stay alive!" and running and screaming in desperate search of any other Japanese survivors.

=== A Soldier's Prayer (1961) ===
The Japanese forces having been shattered during the events of the second film, Kaji and some comrades attempt to elude capture by Soviet forces and find the remnants of the Kwantung Army in South Manchuria. Following the bayonetting of a Russian soldier, however, Kaji is increasingly sick of combat and decides to abandon any pretense of rejoining the army. Instead, he leads fellow soldiers and a growing number of civilian refugees as they attempt to flee the warzone and return to their homes. Lost in a dense forest, the Japanese begin to infight, and eventually many die of hunger, poisonous mushrooms, and suicide. Emerging from the forest on their last legs, Kaji and the surviving soldiers and refugees encounter regular Japanese army troops, who deny them food as if they were deserters. Carrying on further south, Kaji and his associates find a well-stocked farmhouse that is soon ambushed by Chinese peasant partisans. A prostitute to whom Kaji had shown kindness is killed by the partisans, and Kaji vows to fight them rather than escape. However, overpowered by these newly armed Chinese forces, Kaji and his fellow soldiers are nearly killed and are forced to run through a flaming wheat field to survive. Kaji then encounters a group of fifty Japanese army holdouts who are attempting to resume combat in alliance with the Chinese Nationalists, whom they believe will be supported by American forces, in a civil war against the Russian-backed Communist Chinese. Kaji, a believer in pacifism and socialism, rejects this strategy as misguided and doomed to failure. Eventually, Kaji and a group of Japanese soldiers, whose number has grown to fifteen, fight through Russian patrols and find an encampment of women and old men who seek their protection. Kaji is driven to continue moving in search of his wife but decides to surrender to Soviet forces when the encampment is besieged.

Captured by the Red Army and subjected to treatment that echoes the violence meted out to the Chinese in the first film, Kaji and his protégé Terada resist the Japanese officers who run their work camp in cooperation with the Soviet occupiers. While such resistance amounts to no more than picking through the Russians' garbage for scraps of food and wearing gunnysacks to protect them from increasingly colder weather, Kaji is branded a saboteur and judged by a Soviet tribunal to harsh labor. With a corrupt translator and no other means of talking to the Russian officers with whom he feels ideological sympathies, Kaji becomes increasingly disillusioned by conditions in the camp and with Communist orthodoxy. When Terada is driven to exhaustion and death by harsh treatment from the collaborating officer Kirihara, Kaji decides to kill the man and then escape the camp alone. Still dreaming of finding his wife and abused as a worthless beggar and as a "Japanese devil" by the Chinese peasants of whom he begs mercy, Kaji eventually succumbs to the cold and dies in the vast winter wasteland covered in snow.

== Cast ==
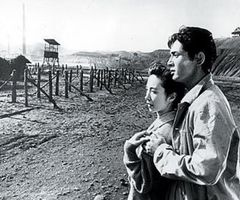
Tatsuya Nakadai and Michiyo Aratama in 1959.

- Tatsuya Nakadai as Kaji
- Michiyo Aratama as Michiko

=== No Greater Love ===
- Chikage Awashima as Tōfuku Kin
- Ineko Arima as Shunran Yō
- Sō Yamamura as Okishima
- Keiji Sada as Kageyama
- Kōji Nanbara as Kao (as Shinji Nanbara)
- Akira Ishihama as Chen
- Kōji Mitsui as Furuya
- Seiji Miyaguchi as Wang Heng Li
- Eitaro Ozawa as Okazaki
- Toru Abe as Sergeant Watai
- Junkichi Orimoto as Sai
- Masao Mishima as Manager Kuroki
- Kyū Sazanka as Cho Meisan
- Eijirō Tōno as manjū shop proprietor
- Yasushi Nagata as Muta
- Yoshio Kosugi as Kawashima
- Shinsuke Ashida as Matsuda
- Toshiko Kobayashi as Yasuko
- Taiji Tonoyama as Huang
- Ryūji Kita as Liu

=== Road to Eternity ===
- Keiji Sada as Second Lieutenant Kageyama
- Kokinji Katsura as Private 2nd class Sasa
- Jun Tatara as Warrant Officer Hino
- Michirō Minami as Senior Private Yoshida
- Kei Satō as PFC Shinjō
- Kunie Tanaka as Private 2nd class Obara
- Ryōhei Uchida as Sergeant Hashiya
- Shōbun Inoue as PFC Akahoshi
- Taketoshi Naitō as PFC Tange
- Yūsuke Kawazu as Private 2nd class Terada
- Susumu Fujita as Private 2nd class Naruto
- Minoru Chiaki as Corporal Onodera
- Shōji Yasui as apprentice officer
- Fumio Watanabe as staff officer
- Jun Hamamura as First Lieutenant Toi
- Akiji Kobayashi as Second Lieutenant Nonaka
- Hisashi Igawa as PFC Masui

=== A Soldier's Prayer ===
- Tamao Nakamura as refugee girl
- Yūsuke Kawazu as Private 2nd class Terada
- Chishū Ryū as refugee elder
- Taketoshi Naitō as PFC Tange
- Kyōko Kishida as Ryūko
- Ed Keene as Russian officer
- Ronald Self as Chapayev
- Nobuo Kaneko as Corporal Kirihara
- Kazuo Kitamura as Sergeant Major Kitago
- Toshio Takahara as corporal going to Korea
- Kin Sugai as refugee on the road
- Hideko Takamine as a refugee

== Production ==
The film was based upon Junpei Gomikawa's six-part autobiographical novel of the same name, which strongly resonated with the director Masaki Kobayashi. Like the novel's protagonist, he was drafted into the Imperial Japanese Army during World War II and stationed in Japan-occupied Manchuria. Self-described as a pacifist and socialist, he had refused to rise above the rank of a private, feeling opposed to both the war and Japan's imperialist ideology at the time. Kobayashi adhered to such views for the rest of his life, always remaining critical of Japan's conformist culture. He later recalled in his autobiography:

We [Gomikawa and Kobayashi] have many regrets from our youth. Scars. We wish we could have done things this way or that way. In our hearts we wanted so much to resist the army, that inhuman institution; but we couldn't do a thing about that either. Gomikawa couldn't either, no doubt. After the war, we were able to get that all off our chests for the first time in Human Condition. That's why I think of it as a dream we couldn't realize, a romanticization of resistance during our youth.

Remembering his own experiences in the war and feeling connected to the novel's events, Kobayashi secured the rights from Gomikawa and petitioned Shochiku to approve the project. Due to the subject matter directly criticizing the actions of Japan during World War II, the studio was initially unenthusiastic about the film and only relented when Kobayashi threatened to quit. During filming, Kobayashi aimed to be as faithful to Gomikawa's work as possible; he had a copy of the original novel on hand to help in this regard. If any scenes were in the book, but not the script, they would be added in when possible. The actors were usually notified of these changes a day in advance to memorize their new lines. Because of this striving for accuracy, Gomikawa was reportedly very pleased with the adaptation.

Tatsuya Nakadai, who had previously appeared in Kobayashi's The Thick-Walled Room and Black River, was specifically chosen by the director to play the protagonist Kaji. Much of the supporting cast were veteran film and stage actors who had previously worked with Kobayashi on other projects, or who would later become regulars with the director. The film marked Nakadai's first leading role, and he later recalled his performance as being exceptionally challenging. Certain fight scenes called for actual contact, leading to the actor's face becoming swollen. The final sequence additionally involved Nakadai lying face-down in a field, the cameras not stopping until he was completely covered in a mound of snow.

As opposed to hiring Shochiku staff, the crew from the independent studio Ninjin Club were used instead. Kobayashi utilized cinematographer Yoshio Miyajima for the film, having been an admirer of his work for director Fumio Kamei. Despite featuring extensive dialogue in Mandarin, none of the actors were actually Chinese. These lines were spoken phonetically with accompanying burnt-in Japanese subtitles on all prints. Non-Japanese and Russians were seemingly used for the roles of Soviet soldiers, though only Ed Keene and Ronald Self are credited. Due to the non-existent China–Japan relations at the time, Kobayashi scouted out filming locations in Hokkaido for the Manchurian setting over two months. Including pre-production, The Human Condition took four years to complete.

== Release ==
Noted for its length, The Human Condition runs at nine hours, and thirty-nine minutes (579 minutes) and would be the longest film in Kobayashi's career.

The film was released as a trilogy in Japan between 1959 and 1961, while shown at various film festivals internationally. All-night marathons of the entire trilogy were occasionally shown in Japan; screenings with Tatsuya Nakadai in attendance typically sold out. In 1999, Image Entertainment released The Human Condition on three separate Region 0 DVDs. These discs were criticised for their image and sound quality and translation. On 8 September 2009, The Criterion Collection released the entire trilogy with restored image, new translation and supplements. Arrow Video released a dual-format (Blu-ray and DVD) edition of The Human Condition in September 2016. This release included an introduction and select scene commentary by film critic Philip Kemp and supplements, including a booklet with new writing by film scholar David Desser.

== Reception and legacy ==
While the trilogy sparked considerable controversy at the time of its release in Japan, The Human Condition was critically acclaimed, won several international awards, and established Kobayashi as one of the most important Japanese directors of the generation.

At the 21st Venice International Film Festival (1960), the film won the San Giorgio Prize and Pasinetti Award.

The British film critic David Shipman described the trilogy in his 1984 book, The Story of Cinema, as "unequivocally the greatest film ever made".

In his review for The New York Times in 2008, A. O. Scott declared: "Kobayashi's monumental film can clarify and enrich your understanding of what it is to be alive".

Critic Philip Kemp, in his 2009 essay written for The Criterion Collection's release of the trilogy, argues that while "the film suffers from its sheer magnitude [and] from the almost unrelieved somberness of its prevailing mood ... The Human Condition stands as an achievement of extraordinary power and emotional resonance: at once a celebration of the resilience of the individual conscience and a purging of forced complicity in guilt (of a nation and, as the title implies, of the whole human race)".

In 2021, David Mermelstein of Wall Street Journal writes positively of the trilogy: "What's astonishing is the way that Kobayashi juggles the complicated narrative, with its panoply of incidents and significant characters (friends, nemeses and everything in between), so that clarity is never compromised".

== See also ==
- Men and War (film series)
