= Mitasareta seikatsu =

1962 film

- Theatrical release poster
- Directed by: Susumu Hani
- Written by: Susumu Hani; Kunio Shimizu
- Based on: Mitasareta seikatsu by Tatsuzō Ishikawa
- Starring: Joji Ai; Ineko Arima; Koshiro Harada; Yukari Ohba; Takahiro Tamura
- Cinematography: Shigekazu Nagano (as Shigeichi Nagano)
- Edited by: Susumu Hani
- Music by: Tōru Takemitsu
- Production company: Ninjin Club
- Release date: January 14, 1962 (Japan)
- Running time: 102 minutes
- Country: Japan
- Language: Japanese

Mitasareta seikatsu (Japanese: 充たされた生活), also known as A Full Life, is a 1962 Japanese drama film directed by Susumu Hani. It was entered into the 12th Berlin International Film Festival.

== Cast ==
- Joji Ai (as I. George)
- Ineko Arima as Junko
- Koshiro Harada as Ishiguro
- Yukari Ohba
- Takahiro Tamura
