= Isao Tamagawa =

Japanese actor (1922–2004)

Isao Tamagawa (玉川 伊佐男; January 11, 1922 – January 1, 2004) was a Japanese actor. He appeared in the Japanese film Branded to Kill, as Michihiko Yabuhara: the yakuza boss that hires Hanada and seduces his wife. Upon the discovery that his diamond smuggling operation has been burgled, he employs Hanada to execute the guilty parties then adds him to the list when he flubs the job. His final appearance is with a bullet hole in his head.

Tamagawa is also known for his role as the bumbling, but skilled Inspector Ippei Kumano in Super Robot Red Baron, which ran from 1973 to 1974.

On January 1, 2004, Tamagawa died at the age of 81. He was a native of Tokyo.

== Partial filmography ==
- Taiyo no nai machi (1954)
- Tôkyô wan (1962)
- Hidarikî ki no sôgekishâ-Tôkyô wan (1962)
- Shitamachi no taiyô (1963) - Detective
- Rikugun zangyaku monogatari (1963)
- Pale Flower (1964)
- Gate of Flesh (1964) - Horidome
- Kikyô (1964) - Gô Ushiki
- Sâtsu rarete tama ruka (II) (1964)
- Kwaidan (1964) - (segment "Chawan no naka")
- Story of a Prostitute (1965) - Narita
- Kono niji no kieru toki ni mo (1966)
- Tokyo Drifter (1966) - Umetani
- Chimatsuri kenkajo (1966)
- Zero faita dai kûsen (1966)
- Fighting Elegy (1966) - Principal
- Sâsurai ha ore no ûnmei (1966)
- Branded to Kill (1967) - Michihiko Yabuhara
- Japan's Longest Day (1967) - Colonel Okitsugu Arao - Chief of Military Affairs Section
- Taiketsu (1967)
- Ogon no yaro-domo (1967)
- Âa Kimi ga Ai (1967) - Ryôsuke, Iwasa
- Kurobe no taiyo (1968) - Sayama
- Burai hijô (1968) - Gôhara
- Wasureru monoka (1968)
- Arakure (1969)
- Fuji sanchô (1970)
- Gekido no showashi 'Gunbatsu' (1970) - Sukamoto (uncredited)
- Joshi gakuen: Yabai sotsugyô (1970)
- Yomigaeru daichi (1971) - Katsuzo
- Kage gari (1972)
- Graveyard of Honor (1975)
- Shen quan fei long (1975)
- Utareru mae-ni ute! (1976) - Inspector Tomoda
- Utamaro: Yume to shiriseba (1977)
- Hakkodasan (1977) - Captain Okitsu
- Furimukeba ai (1978) - Shintaro Ishiguro
- Jûdai: Keiko no baai (1979) - Tomio Takano
- Tsigoineruwaizen (1980) - Doctor Amaki
- Kagerô-za (1981) - Clerk (final film role)
