= Junpei Gomikawa =

Japanese novelist (1916–1995)

- 五味川純平
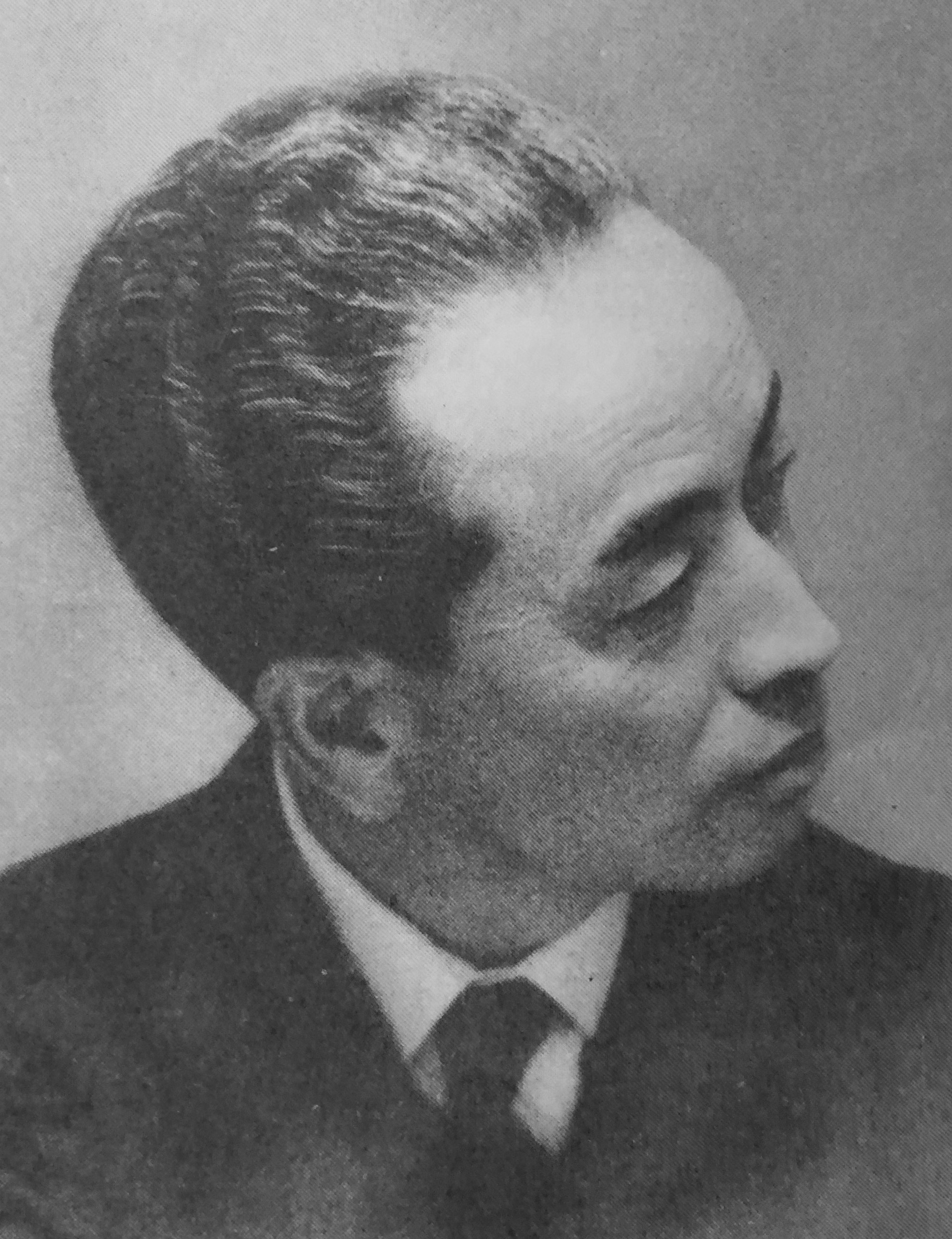
- Gomikawa in 1959
- Born: March 15, 1916; Dalian, Manchukuo
- Died: March 8, 1995 (aged 78)
- Writing career
- Pen name: Junpei Gomikawa
- Notable work: The Human Condition

Shigeru Kurita (栗田 茂, Kurita Shigeru; March 15, 1916 – March 8, 1995), known by his pen name Junpei Gomikawa (五味川 純平, Gomikawa Junpei), was a Japanese novelist. He is best known for his 1958 World War II novel The Human Condition (Ningen no joken), which became a best seller. The novel became the basis for Masaki Kobayashi's film trilogy The Human Condition as well as a radio drama. His eighteen-volume novel Men and War (Senso to ningen), formed the basis for Satsuo Yamamoto's 1970–1973 film trilogy of the same name.

== Biography ==
Gomikawa was born and raised in Dalian in colonial Manchuria, referring to himself as a "second generation Manchurian-Japanese". He enrolled in the Tokyo College of Commerce (today Hitotsubashi University) in 1933 but dropped out and entered the Tokyo University of Foreign Languages in 1936. In 1940, Gomikawa was arrested under suspicion of violating the Peace Preservation Law but nevertheless graduated and returned to Manchuria to take a job at the Anshan Ironworks Company, where he noted that the economic conditions were attractive for Japanese living in Manchuria, compared to Koreans, Chinese, and recent graduates living in Japan. He was eventually drafted in 1942. Gomikawa was a soldier in the Kwantung Army, a unit of the Imperial Japanese Army, stationed on the border of the Soviet Union and Manchukuo. Holding a below-officer rank, he survived a Soviet tank attack in which 154 men of his 158-person unit died. According to Kobayashi, Gomikawa had worked as a labor supervisor in a mine where he witnessed executions. After surviving the Soviet offensive in August 1945, he returned to Japan in October 1947.

=== The Human Condition ===
Prior to the publication of The Human Condition, a semi-autobiographical novel, Gomikawa had only published one short story and staged one play. He began working on The Human Condition in 1955 with the first volume released in August 1956 and immediately followed by the second. The final volume was published in February 1958, by which point it had sold millions of copies. The volumes were published by San’ichi shobō (三一書房), a small publishing company part of the mutual support organization Mokuyōkai (木曜会, The Thursday Association) that was sympathetic to the Japanese Communist Party and were on the forefront of moderate left-wing publishing. San’ichi Shobō was the most active member of the Mokuyōkai in the late 1950s but struggled financially until the commercial success of The Human Condition.

The six-part novel was adapted into film by Masaki Kobayashi, with whom Gomikawa shared political and life experiences. Both had been stationed in Manchukuo, served in the Kwantung Army, and both were taken prisoner at the end of the war (Gomikawa by the Soviets, whereas Kobayashi was held in an American POW camp in Okinawa). Kobayashi, part of the Ninjin Club (Carrot Club) production company, first heard of the novel from actress and club member Ineko Arima. Arima was the first one in the group to have read the novel before it became widely popular and soon convinced other members to read it. The company acted swiftly to buy the rights for a film adaptation, a week before the Shukan Asahi, a weekly publication, released a special issue on "hidden bestsellers" that paid special attention to Gomikawa's novel. The weekly noted that although Gomikawa was an unknown author and the novel was unserialized, unadvertised, and not broadcast on radio or television, it was avidly read across Japan in both rural and urban areas and was frequently passed around in labor union reading groups.

In an interview, Gomikawa commented that the principal character of the novel, Kaji, had many characteristics that were absent in the real members of the Japanese left, such as decisiveness, strength, and bravery; he also noted that real intellectuals are not as weak as people think. Kaji, who was not repatriated, resonated strongly with tens of thousands of families who were waiting for the return of their loved ones into the late 1950s. In James Orr's book on postwar Japan, Gomikawa received hundreds of letters from women asking if his writings reflected experiences their husbands and sons had lived through.

=== Later work ===
After the publication of the final volume of The Human Condition, Gomikawa published and serialized The Historical Experiment (歴史の実験) in the monthly magazine Chūōkōron about a soldier in a defense unit on the Soviet-Manchuria border who barely survived a scene of carnage.

In June 1963 Gomikawa visited East Africa with the writer Noma Kanjirō, a key figure in the early anti-apartheid movement in Japan where they attended a South Africa Freedom Day in Dar es Salaam.

Following the publication of The Human Condition, Gomikawa continued writing about the events of the war, including a widely read book on the history of the Nomonhan Incident following the lifting of the ban on its reportage.

== Works ==
=== Novels ===
- Gomikawa, Junpei (1956–1958), 人間の條件 (Ningen no joken) (in Japanese), 三一書房
- Gomikawa, Junpei (1959), The Historical Experiment (歴史の実験), 中央公論社, OCLC 55658037
- Gomikawa, Junpei (1964), 人間の朝; 東アフリカ記行 (Morning of Human Beings: On Travels in East Africa), 河出書房新社, OCLC 22445834
- Gomikawa, Junpei (1978), ノモンハン (Nomonhan) (in Japanese), 文芸春秋, OCLC 10753683
- Gomikawa, Junpei (1983–1984), 戦争と人間 (Senso to ningen) (in Japanese), OCLC 10753683

=== Essays ===
- The collapse of the 'myth': the ambitions and dissolution of the Kwantung Army (Shinwa’ no hōkai: Kantōgun no yabō to hatan), 1988
