= Yokohama incident =

1943-1945 Japanese arrests of suspected communists

The Yokohama incident (横浜事件, Yokohama Jiken) took place in Imperial Japan during World War II. Between 1943 and 1945, the Yokohama Special Higher Police arrested nearly three-dozen intellectuals for charges of attempting to revive the Communist Party. Suspects included editors of the Chuo Koron, Kaizō, and Nippon Hyoron magazines. Suspects were subjected to physical violence, and three died as a result of mistreatment.

In 2010, the Yokohama District Court ordered the government to pay compensation to the relatives of five deceased men for falsely imprisoning them.

== See also ==
- Popular Front Incident
- Red Scare in Japan
- Political repression in Imperial Japan
- Peace Preservation Law
