= Yumpu =

Swiss online magazine

- Company type: AG
- Industry: Electronic Publishing
- Founded: 2011
- Founder: Norbert Rom
- Headquarters: Diepoldsau, Switzerland
- Website: www.yumpu.com

Yumpu is an electronic publishing platform of i-Magazine AG, based in Diepoldsau (Switzerland).

== History ==
Yumpu was launched in 2011 as a self-publishing service for B2B by Norbert Rom's i-magazine AG (founded 2006). I-magazine AG, in turn, is a subsidiary of adRom Holding AG, which was also founded by Norbert Rom. In 2016, Yummy Publishing GmbH was founded in Austria as a subsidiary of i-Magazine AG, which supports the parent company with various services.

In January 2020, in addition to the B2B-service Yumpu Publishing, the YumpuNews service launched in Germany, Austria and Switzerland as a B2C-service, with newspapers in the German language available. Since February 2021, it has beend including UK newspapers. The company calls Yumpu News the "Spotify for publishers" and includes a revenue-sharing business model.

In the global Alexa website ranking of 2019, Yumpu is among the top 3.000 websites in the world. In 2020, publishers included approximately 24.000 educational institutions, 26.000 government institutions, and 1.200 institutional publishers. Yumpu had more than 15 million readers per month in 2020.

== Corporate structure ==
Yumpu is the platform of i-Magazine AG, a subsidiary of adRom Holding AG. I-Magazine is also the parent company of Yummy Publishing GmbH.

The headquarters of i-Magazine is in Diepoldsau (Switzerland). The managing director of the company is Norbert Rom.

== Functions ==
Yumpu Publishing offers digital page-turning software for publishers. Since 2020, it has been using its proprietary software to build a "digital newsstand". The service is also offered as a mobile app, the Yumpu Publishing AppKiosk.

With Yumpu, an interactive publication can be created from a PDF, which can then be embedded and offered for sale on websites, blogs or on social networks. While the publisher decides on the content type of their publication, Yumpu Publishing converts any PDF into a page-turning ePaper. This ePaper can be provided with multimedia elements such as sound, video, images and links. The PDFs are readable by search engines like Google.

The Yumpu Publishing service can be used for free or through a paid subscription. The paid subscription comes at four different levels, where publishers also have the option to gain access to data about their publications.

Yumpu News is a subscription-based platform through which users can read various news publications. Its service can initially be used for 30 days in a free trial subscription; after that, a paid registration is necessary. It is available on desktop and mobile apps.

== Awards ==
- 2022: VAMP Award Austria – Bronze in the category "The most attractive sales promotion"
- 2022: EFFIE Award Austria – Bronze with the project "Yumpu – the digital kiosk“ in the "Newcomer" category
