= Keiko Kishi =

Japanese actress and writer (1932–2026)

- 岸 惠子
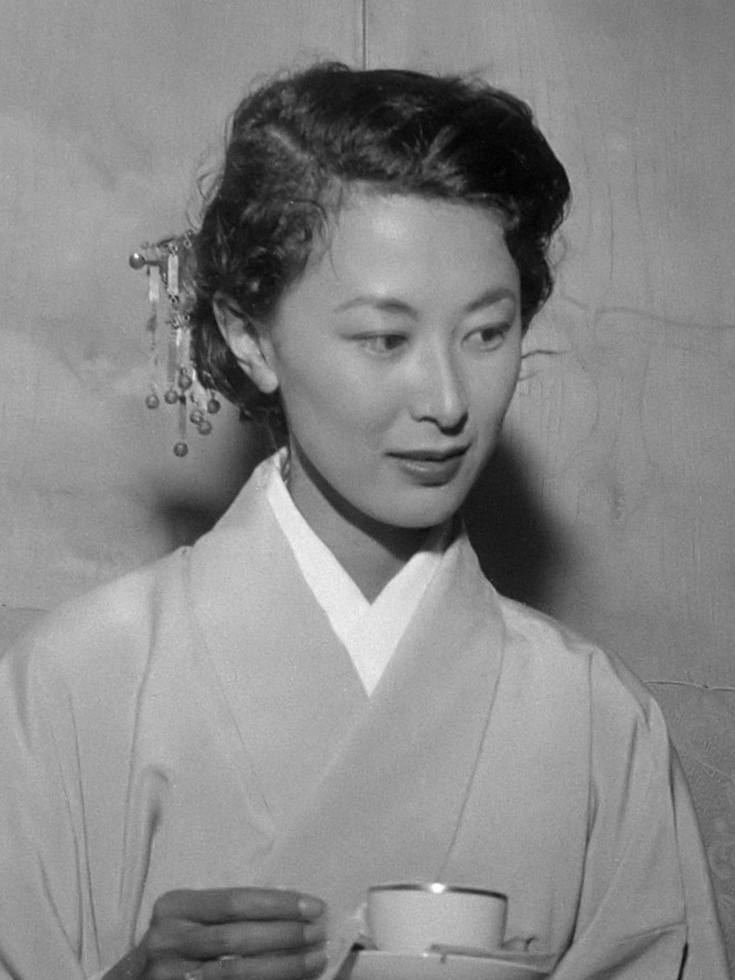
- Kishi in 1957
- Born: 11 August 1932; Yokohama, Japan
- Died: 7 August 2026 (aged 93)
- Occupations: Actress; writer
- Years active: 1951–2026
- Spouse: Yves Ciampi (m. 1957; div. 1975)
- Children: 1

Keiko Kishi (岸 惠子, Kishi Keiko; 11 August 1932 – 7 August 2026) was a Japanese actress, writer and UNFPA Goodwill Ambassador. She was a Japan Academy Film Prize winner, out of three total nominations.

== Early life and career ==
Kishi was born in Yokohama on 11 August 1932, and studied ballet as a child. She aspired to be a novelist, as an admirer of Yasunari Kawabata.

She made her acting debut in 1951 in Noboru Nakamura's film Home Sweet Home.

Kishi co-founded the production company Ninjin Club, with Yoshiko Kuga and Ineko Arima in 1954.

In the 1950s, David Lean proposed her for the main role in The Wind Cannot Read, which is about a Japanese language instructor in India circa 1943 who falls in love with a British officer, but that idea fell through and Yoko Tani was eventually cast in the role.

From 1996 she was a Goodwill Ambassador for the United Nations Population Fund (UNFPA).

In 2002, she won the Japan Academy Prize for best actress for her role in the film Kah-chan.

== Personal life and death ==
Kishi married the French director Yves Ciampi in 1957, and commuted for a while between Paris and Japan to continue her acting career. In 1963 a daughter was born. She divorced her husband in 1975. Kishi had two grandchildren by her daughter.

Kishi died on 7 August 2026, four days before her 94th birthday.

== Filmography (selected) ==
=== Film ===
- Home Sweet Home (1951)
- The Idiot (1951)
- Hibari no Sākasu Kanashiki Kobato (1952)
- The Thick-Walled Room (1953, rel. 1956)
- The Garden of Women (1954)
- Takekurabe (1955)
- Early Spring (1956)
- I Will Buy You (1956)
- Typhoon Over Nagasaki (1957)
- Untamed (1957)
- Snow Country (1957)
- The Snow Flurry (1959)
- Her Brother (1960)
- Ten Dark Women (1961)
- The Inheritance (1962)
- Love Under the Crucifix (1962)
- Rififi in Tokyo (1963)
- Kwaidan (1964)
- Mastermind (1969)
- The Rendezvous (1972)
- Tora-san Loves an Artist (1973)
- The Yakuza (1974)
- The Fossil (1975)
- Two in the Amsterdam Rain (1975)
- The Devil's Ballad (1977)
- Queen Bee (1978)
- Hunter in the Dark (1979)
- Koto (1980)
- The Makioka Sisters (1983)
- Shikibu Monogatari (1990)
- Kah-chan (2001)
- The Twilight Samurai (2002)
- Autumn in Warsaw (2003)
- Grave of the Fireflies (2005)
- Snow Prince (2009)

=== Television ===
- Vol 272, Miki
- Taikōki (1965), Oichi
- The Eldest Boy and His Three Elder Sisters (2003), Satoko Kashiwakura
- Mango no Ki no Shita de (2019), Rinko

== Honours ==
- Kinuyo Tanaka Award (1990)
- Order of the Rising Sun, 4th Class, Gold Rays with Rosette (2004)
