= Pale Flower =

1964 film noir by Masahiro Shinoda

- Film poster
- Directed by: Masahiro Shinoda
- Screenplay by: Masaru Baba; Masahiro Shinoda
- Story by: Shintaro Ishihara
- Produced by: Masao Shirai; Shigeru Wakatsuki
- Starring: Ryō Ikebe; Mariko Kaga; Isao Sasaki; Takashi Fujiki; Chisako Hara
- Cinematography: Masao Kosugi
- Edited by: Yoshi Sugihara
- Music by: Toru Takemitsu
- Production company: Ninjin Club
- Distributed by: Shochiku
- Release date: March 1, 1964 (Japan)
- Running time: 96 minutes
- Country: Japan
- Language: Japanese

Pale Flower (Japanese: 乾いた花, Hepburn: Kawaita hana) is a 1964 Japanese film noir directed by Masahiro Shinoda. The film is about Muraki (Ryō Ikebe), a Yakuza hitman just released from prison. At an illegal gambling parlor, he finds himself drawn to a mysterious young woman named Saeko (Mariko Kaga). Though Saeko loses large sums of money, she asks Muraki to find games with larger and larger stakes. The two become involved in an intense mutually destructive relationship. Film critic Roger Ebert gave Pale Flower four stars and placed it on his list of Great Movies.

== Plot ==
Muraki, a hard-boiled yakuza, has been released from prison after serving a sentence for murdering a Funada gang member, only to learn his gang and the Funada gang have since merged. At an illegal gambling parlor, he bets a large sum of money and loses to the mysterious Saeko, a young upper class thrill-seeker. Later that night, he reconnects with Shinko Furuta, his former lover.

The next day at a horse race, Muraki learns that the Yakuza have made peace with the Funada gang to counter an incursion by the Imai gang from Osaka. A week later, Saeko asks Muraki to take her somewhere she can play for higher stakes.

A co-worker from her office proposes marriage to Shinko, but she rejects him. She tells Muraki she still loves him, but he tells her to marry the co-worker.

Muraki takes Saeko to a high-stakes gambling den at Aikawa's Inn in Tsunamachi, Tokyo, where she wins another large sum of money. Muraki notices a man who sits in the corner staring at him. Muraki learns the man is Yoh, a heroin addict who fled Hong Kong after committing two murders. Muraki tells Saeko that he hates drug addicts, but Saeko is drawn to Yoh and the thrill of illegal drug use. With Muraki as a passenger, Saeko challenges another driver to a high-speed drag race, and laughs in delight after it ends.

The gang leaders consider sending Muraki to kill the head of the Imai gang. After another night of high-stakes gambling, Muraki is ambushed on the street by an unknown knife-wielding assailant.

Out of gambling money, Muraki goes days without seeing Saeko. He later tells his friend Reiji about a recurring nightmare in which Yoh gives Saeko a drug injection. Waking from the nightmare, he learns that Tamaki, a member of the Funada gang, has been killed by the Imai gang. Reiji offers to avenge Tamaki's death, but Funada turns him down. Muraki volunteers to kill Imai, and Funada gives him all the time he needs to prepare, suggesting that he use a knife instead of a gun.

At his apartment, Shinko demands to know about Saeko and threatens to stalk them. Muraki again encourages her to marry because he will be returning to prison soon. Shinko reveals a message from Saeko asking Muraki to meet her at their usual place.

Muraki meets Saeko, and she tells him she experimented with heroin. Angered, Muraki tells her to stop and offers a bigger thrill: to watch him kill a man. He takes her to the café where Imai is eating with friends and brutally stabs him to death in front of the patrons.

Two years later, while imprisoned for the murder, Muraki is visited by his friend Jiro. Jiro tells him that Saeko was killed by Yoh in a crime of passion. Jiro says he discovered Saeko's true identity, but Muraki is hastened back to his cell before Jiro can continue. Muraki reflects that her real identity doesn't matter, and even in death he still hungers for her.

== Cast ==
- Ryō Ikebe as Muraki
- Mariko Kaga as Saeko
- Takashi Fujiki as Yoh
- Naoki Sugiura as Aikawa
- Shinichiro Mikami as Reiji
- Isao Sasaki as Jiro
- Kôji Nakahara as Tamaki
- Chisako Hara as Yazuka's Lover
- Seiji Miyaguchi as Gang leader Funada
- Eijirô Tôno as Gang Leader Yasuoka

== Production ==
Director Shinoda was influenced by Charles Baudelaire's Les Fleurs du mal while making the film. Shinoda chose the subject of yakuza as he felt the yakuza world is the only place where a Japanese ceremonial structure is sustained. The movie was adapted from a novel by Shintaro Ishihara, with Shinoda and Masaru Baba splitting the script for the film (the former doing the first half and the latter doing the second half). Apparently, Baba was most displeased with the film in terms of it not being what he wrote. This led to months of delay in releasing the movie. It was Shinoda who cast Ryō Ikebe in the lead role, specifically wanting an actor "who had fallen on hard times" as opposed to using an actor already on contract such as Keiji Sada. Ikebe had been at home when Shinoda approached him due to flubs he made on the theater stage for Toho when he couldn't deliver long lines. In fact, Ikebe even thought he was joking with the offer, stating he was a "ham actor." Shinoda pointed out that the actor (who had acted in films for Ozu) had been cast for films because "you walk very gracefully", stating that he had a "very erotic and graceful presence." Shinoda equated the dynamic between the two main actors to being akin to the poem Tristan and Iseult.

== Release ==
The film's focus on visuals and sound over dialogue prompted screenwriter Masaru Baba to complain to managers at Shochiku. His accusation that Shinoda had made an "anarchistic" film led to a nine-month delay of the film's release.

=== Home video ===
Homevision released a Region 1 DVD of Pale Flower on November 18, 2003. The Criterion Collection released a DVD and Blu-ray edition of the film that features a video interview with Masahiro Shinoda as well as commentary by film scholar Peter Grilli.

== Reception ==
On the review aggregator website Rotten Tomatoes, 92% of 12 critics' reviews are positive, with an average rating of 8.4/10. Roger Ebert of The Chicago Sun-Times gave the film four out of four stars and wrote, "Pale Flower is one of the most haunting noirs I've seen, and something more; in 1964 it was an important work in an emerging Japanese New Wave of independent filmmakers, an exercise in existential cool." He later placed it on his list of Great Movies.

== Legacy ==
In 2012, filmmaker Ashim Ahluwalia included the film in his personal top ten (for The Sight & Sound Top 50 Greatest Films of All Time poll), writing: "Why can’t all film noir be like Pale Flower?" In 2022, filmmaker Michael Mann included the film in his personal top ten for Sight and Sound, writing: "For its incredible opening scenes alone."

Has been shown on the Turner Classic Movies show 'Noir Alley' with Eddie Muller.
