= Yoshio Miyajima =

Japanese cinematographer (1909–1998)

- 宮島義勇
- Born: February 3, 1909; Nagano, Empire of Japan
- Died: February 21, 1998 (aged 89)
- Occupation: Cinematographer
- Years active: 1929–1998
- Notable work: Harakiri; The Human Condition trilogy; Kwaidan

Yoshio Miyajima (宮島義勇, Miyajima Yoshio; February 3, 1909 – February 21, 1998) was a Japanese cinematographer during the 20th century. Notable works include Harakiri, The Human Condition trilogy, and Kwaidan.

== Filmography ==
- Utano yononaka (The Singing World) (1936)
- Bushido orakanarishi (When the Bushido is Big-Hearted) (1936)
- Nihon josei dokuhon (Japanese Women's Textbook) (1937)
- Minamikaze no oka (Hill of the South Wind) (1937)
- Edo no shirasagi (White Egret in Edo) (1937)
- Kaminari oyaji (Tough Dad) (1937)
- Jinsei Keiba (Life Is a Horse Race) (1938)
- Katei niki (zen) (Family Diary, Part One) (1938)
- Katei niki (go) (Family Diary, Part One) (1938)
- Den'en kôkyôgaku (Pastoral Symphony) (1939)
- Uruwashiki shupatu (Beautiful Departure) (1939)
- Machi (Town) (1939)
- Roppa no shinkon ryoko (Roppa's Honeymoon) (1940)
- Ribbon o musubu fujin (The Lady Ties a Ribbon) (1939)
- Moyuru ōzora (The Burning Sky) (1940)
- Shidô monogatari (1941)
- Ani no hanayome (A Brother's Bride) (1941)
- Kaiketsu (The Solution) (1941)
- Ano hata o ute (Fire on the Flag!) (1944)
- War and Peace (Sensô to heiwa) (1947)
- Onna no issho (1949)
- And Yet We Live (Dokkoi ikiteru)(1951)
- Boryoku (1952)
- Mura hachibu (1953)
- Kani Kōsen (1953)
- Before Dawn (Yoake mae) (1953)
- Wakai hitotachi (1954)
- Ashizuri misaki (1954)
- Aisureba koso (1955) - (segment "1")
- Ginza no onna (1955)
- Bijo to kairyū (1955)
- An Actress (Joyu) (1956)
- Yellow Crow (Kiiroi karasu) (1957)
- Umi no yarodomo (1957)
- Hotarubi (1958)
- Kisetsufu no kanatani (1958)
- Naked Sun (1958)
- The Human Condition I: No Greater Love (1959)
- Karatachi nikki (1959)
- The Human Condition II: Road to Eternity (1959)
- Onna no saka (1960)
- Lover Under the Crucifix (Ogin sama) (1960)
- The Human Condition III: A Soldier's Prayer (1961)
- Harakiri (1962)
- Love Under the Crucifix (1962)
- Kwaidan (1964)
- Live Your Own Way (Wakamono tachi) (1967)
- Zoku otoshimae (1968)
- Forward Ever Forward (Wakamono wa yuku) (1969)
- Empire of Passion (1978)
- The Fall of Ako Castle (1978)
- Shikake-nin Baian (1981)

== Awards and nominations ==
Year	Group	Award	Result	Film
1954	Mainichi Film Award	Best Cinematography	Won	Before Dawn (1953); Kanikosen (1953)
1960	Mainichi Film Award	Best Cinematography	Won	The Human Condition I: No Greater Love (1959); The Human Condition II: Road to Eternity (1959)
1962	Mainichi Film Award	Best Cinematography	Won	The Human Condition III: A Soldier's Prayer (1961)
1966	Mainichi Film Award	Best Cinematography	Won	Kwaidan (1964)
1979	Japanese Academy Prize	Best Cinematography	Nominated	Empire of Passion (1978); The Fall of Ako Castle (1978)
1999	Mainichi Film Award	Special Award	Won	For his work
