= Kōji Nanbara =

Japanese actor (1927–2001)

Koji Nanbara
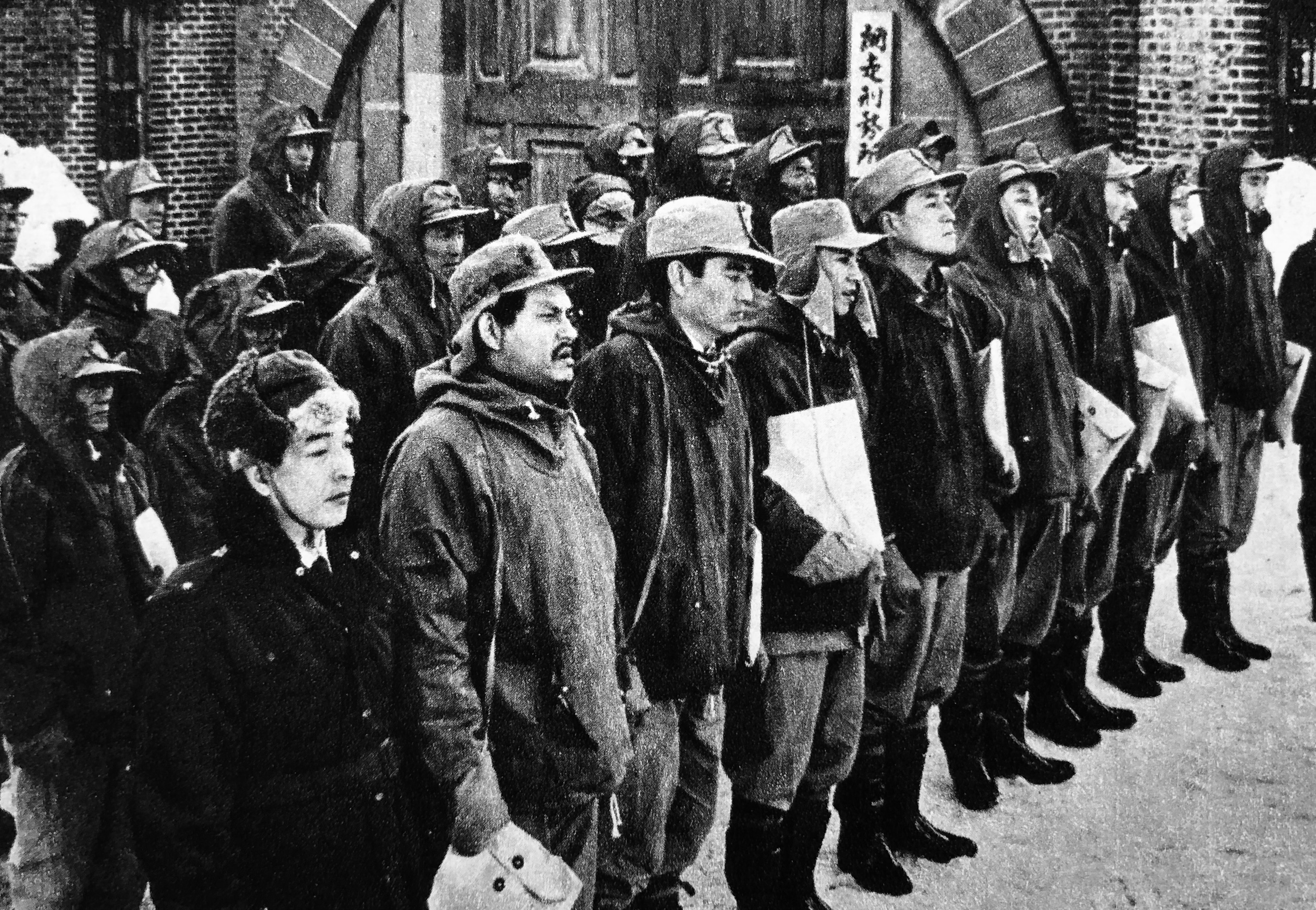
- Nanbara, second from left in front row, in Abashiri Prison
- Born: June 7, 1927; Yokohama, Kanagawa, Japan
- Died: December 20, 2001 (aged 74); Chōfu, Tokyo, Japan
- Other name: Shinji Nanbara (南原伸二)
- Years active: 1951–2001

Koji Nanbara (南原 宏治, Nanbara Kōji; June 7, 1927 – December 20, 2001) was a Japanese actor. He was born in Yokohama, Kanagawa, Japan. In 1951, he signed with Daiei film company. and made his film debut with Kamikaze Tokkotai. Mostly famous later in his career for playing villains, he began acting in the 1950s under the name Shinji Nanbara. He died of a myocardial infarction in Chōfu, Tokyo at age 74.

== Selected filmography ==
=== Films ===
- Danger Stalks Near (1957) – Akama
- The Human Condition (1959) – Gao
- The Bad Sleep Well (1960) – Horiuchi
- Zero Focus (1961) – Kenichi Uhara
- Love Under the Crucifix (1962) -
- Abashiri Prison (1965) – Gonda
- Branded to Kill (1967) – the Number One Killer
- Eleven Samurai (1967) – Chief Retainer Tatewaki
- Samurai Banners (1969) – Aoki
- Zatoichi and the One-Armed Swordsman (1971) – Kakuzen
- Kantō Exile (1971)
- Wandering Ginza Butterfly (1972) – Ōwada
- Za Gokiburi - Shimura
- Female Convict Scorpion: Beast Stable
- Lady Snowblood 2: Love Song of Vengeance (1974)
- The Resurrection of the Golden Wolf (1979) – Isokawa
- A Taxing Woman's Return (1988) – Yoneda
- Sakura no Sono (1990) – Nakamura

=== Television ===
- Katsu Kaishū (TV series) (1974)(Taiga Drama)
- G-Men '75 (1977) – Guest, Kimishima
- Daitsuiseki (1978) – Guest’ Genda, Okazaki
- The Yagyu Conspiracy (1978)

=== Dubbing ===
- Escape from Zahrain – Sharif (Yul Brynner)
- Judd, for the Defense – Clinton Judd (Carl Betz)
- Sherlock Holmes (1984) – Professor Moriarty (Eric Porter)
- Star Wars Episode IV: A New Hope (Movie theater edition) – Darth Vader
- Star Wars Episode V: The Empire Strikes Back (Movie theater edition) – Darth Vader
