= Ninjin Club =

Japanese film production company

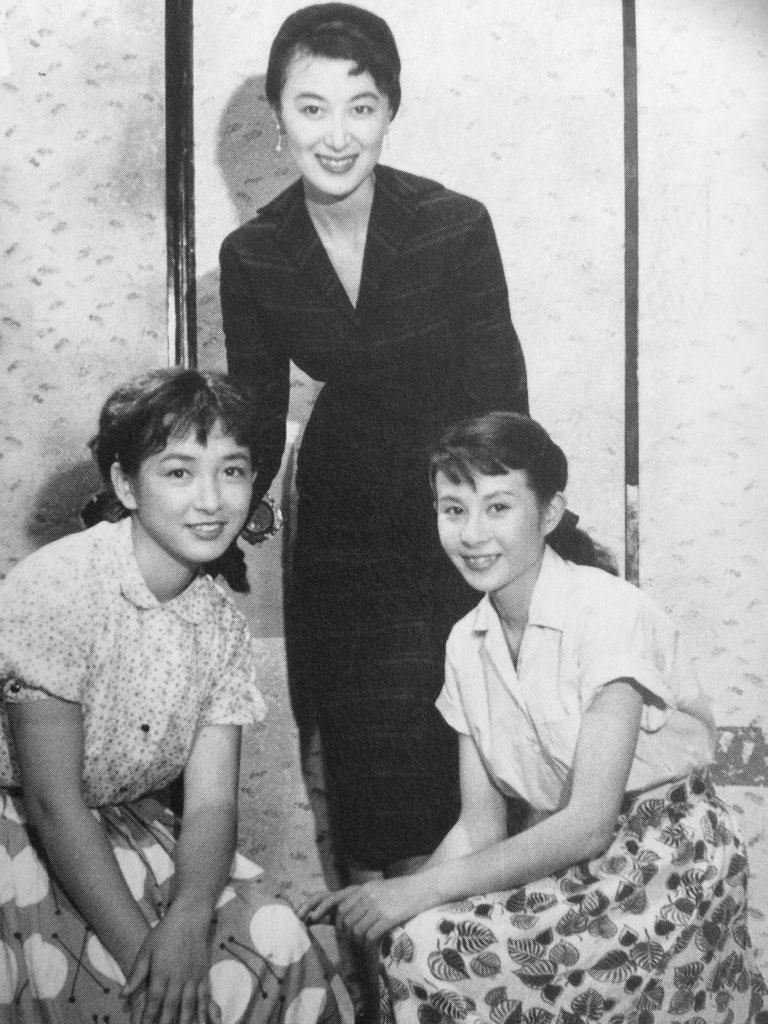
- Ninjin Club founders in 1954: Ineko Arima, Keiko Kishi, Yoshiko Kuga (left to right).
- Native name: 文芸プロダクションにんじんくらぶ
- Romanized name: Bungei Purodakushon Ninjin Kurabu
- Company type: Private
- Industry: Film
- Founded: April 16, 1954
- Founder: Keiko Kishi; Yoshiko Kuga; Ineko Arima
- Defunct: 1965
- Successor: Ninjin Productions
- Headquarters: Japan
- Key people: Shigeru Wakatsuki (representative director and president)

Ninjin Club (文芸プロダクションにんじんくらぶ, Bungei Purodakushon Ninjin Kurabu; lit. 'Literary Production Carrot Club') was a Japanese independent film production company founded on April 16, 1954, by actresses Keiko Kishi, Yoshiko Kuga, and Ineko Arima. The company aimed to circumvent the restrictive Japanese studio system and enable creative freedom for actors, particularly women. It collaborated with major studios like Shochiku and Toho and produced many acclaimed films, but declared bankruptcy in 1965 after the costly epic Kwaidan failed commercially. In 1966, the company's president Shigeru Wakatsuki founded a successor, Ninjin Productions, to produce Kamikaze Man: Duel at Noon.

== Selected films ==
- Mune yori mune ni (1955) - debut
- Black River (1957)
- The Human Condition I: No Greater Love (1959)
- Road to Eternity (1959)
- A Soldier's Prayer (1961)
- Mitasareta seikatsu (1962)
- Love Under the Crucifix (1962)
- Pale Flower (1964)
- Kwaidan (1964)
