= Michiyo Aratama =

Japanese actress (1930–2001)

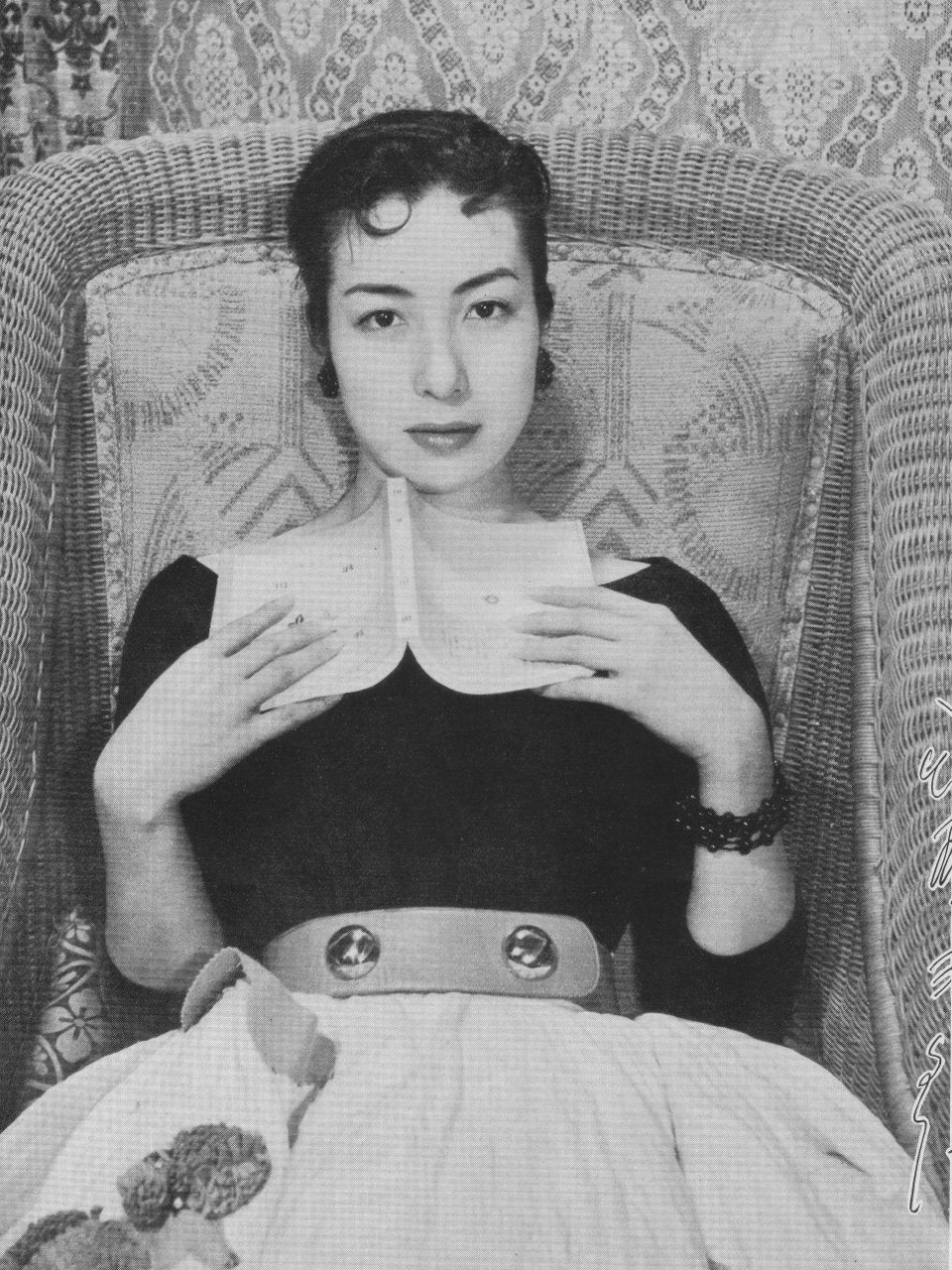
- Michiyo Aratama in 1955
- Born: Kyoko Toda; 15 January 1930; Nara, Japan
- Died: 17 March 2001 (aged 71); Tokyo, Japan
- Occupation: Actress
- Years active: 1946–2001

Michiyo Aratama (新珠三千代, Aratama Michiyo; 15 January 1930 – 17 March 2001) was a Japanese film and stage actress.

== Biography ==
After graduating from the Takarazuka Music and Dance School, Aratama joined the Takarazuka Revue in 1945. She gave her film debut in 1951, but it was not before 1955 that she left the Takarazuka Revue, signing first with Nikkatsu film studios, then, after her contract expired, with Toho. She worked for directors such as Mikio Naruse, Yasujirō Ozu and Masaki Kobayashi, appearing in films like The Human Condition, The End of Summer, Kwaidan and 47 Ronin.

From the late 1970s on she concentrated solely on stage and television work. Due to health problems, she reduced her appearances after 1994. She died of heart failure in 2001. Aratama never married.

== Selected filmography ==
=== Films ===
Year	Title	Role	Directed by
1953	Wife	Yoshimi	Mikio Naruse
1955	The Heart	Shizu	Kon Ichikawa
1956	The Balloon		Yūzō Kawashima
1956	Suzaki Paradise: Red Light	Tsutae	Yūzō Kawashima
1958	A Holiday in Tokyo		Kajirō Yamamoto
1958	Conflagration		Kon Ichikawa
1958	Summer Clouds	Chie	Mikio Naruse
1959	The Human Condition	Michiko	Masaki Kobayashi
1960	The Twilight Story	Mitsuko Taneda	Shirō Toyoda
1961	The End of Summer	Fumiko	Yasujirō Ozu
1962	47 Ronin		Hiroshi Inagaki
1963	The Elegant Life of Mr. Everyman	Natsuko	Kihachi Okamoto
1964	Kwaidan		Masaki Kobayashi
1965	Samurai Assassin		Kihachi Okamoto
1966	The Stranger Within a Woman	Masako Tashiro	Mikio Naruse
1966	The Sword of Doom	Hama	Kihachi Okamoto
1967	Lost Spring		Noboru Nakamura
1968	Hymn to a Tired Man		Masaki Kobayashi
1969	Chōkōsō no Akebono	Sachiko	Hideo Sekigawa

=== Television ===
Year	Title	Role	Network	Notes
1969	Ten to Chi to	Kesa Gozen	NHK	Taiga drama
1972	Shin Heike Monogatari	Gion no Nyogo	NHK	Taiga drama
1976	Kaze to Kumo to Niji to	Masako	NHK	Taiga drama

== Awards ==
- 1959 Blue Ribbon Award for Best Supporting Actress for The Human Condition and Watashi wa kai ni naritai
- 1959 Kinema Junpo Award for Best Actress for The Human Condition
- 1961 Mainichi Film Concour for Best Supporting Actress for The End of Summer and Minami no kaze to nami
