= Ineko Arima =

Japanese film actress

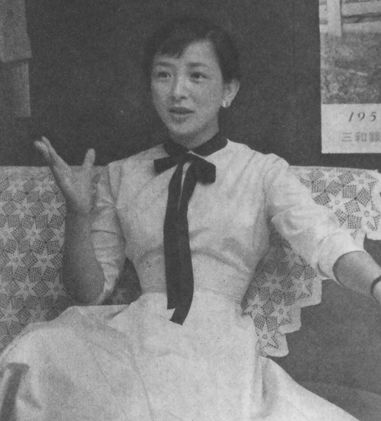
- Ineko Arima in 1955
- Born: Moriko Nakanishi; 3 April 1932 (age 93); Ikeda, Osaka, Japan
- Occupation: Actress
- Years active: 1949-present
- Spouses: Nakamura Kinnosuke (m. 1961–1965); Saburō Kawamura (m. 1969–1983)

Ineko Arima (有馬稲子, Arima Ineko; born 3 April 1932) is a Japanese stage and film actress. She has appeared in films of directors such as Yasujirō Ozu, Mikio Naruse and Kon Ichikawa. In 1954, Arima co-founded Ninjin Club with Keiko Kishi and Yoshiko Kuga.

== Personal life ==
Born as Moriko Nakanishi, she is the youngest of six siblings. Her parents were labor activists who went into hiding, which led to her aunt and her husband adopting her. After the war ended, she returned to her family in Osaka, where her father turned out to be abusive and eventually left. Influenced by her adoptive mother, who was once a Takarazuka Revue actress, she joined the troupe and became known as Ineko Anima the Second, performing male roles, before joining the film industry.

She had extramarital affair with Kon Ichikawa.

== Selected filmography ==
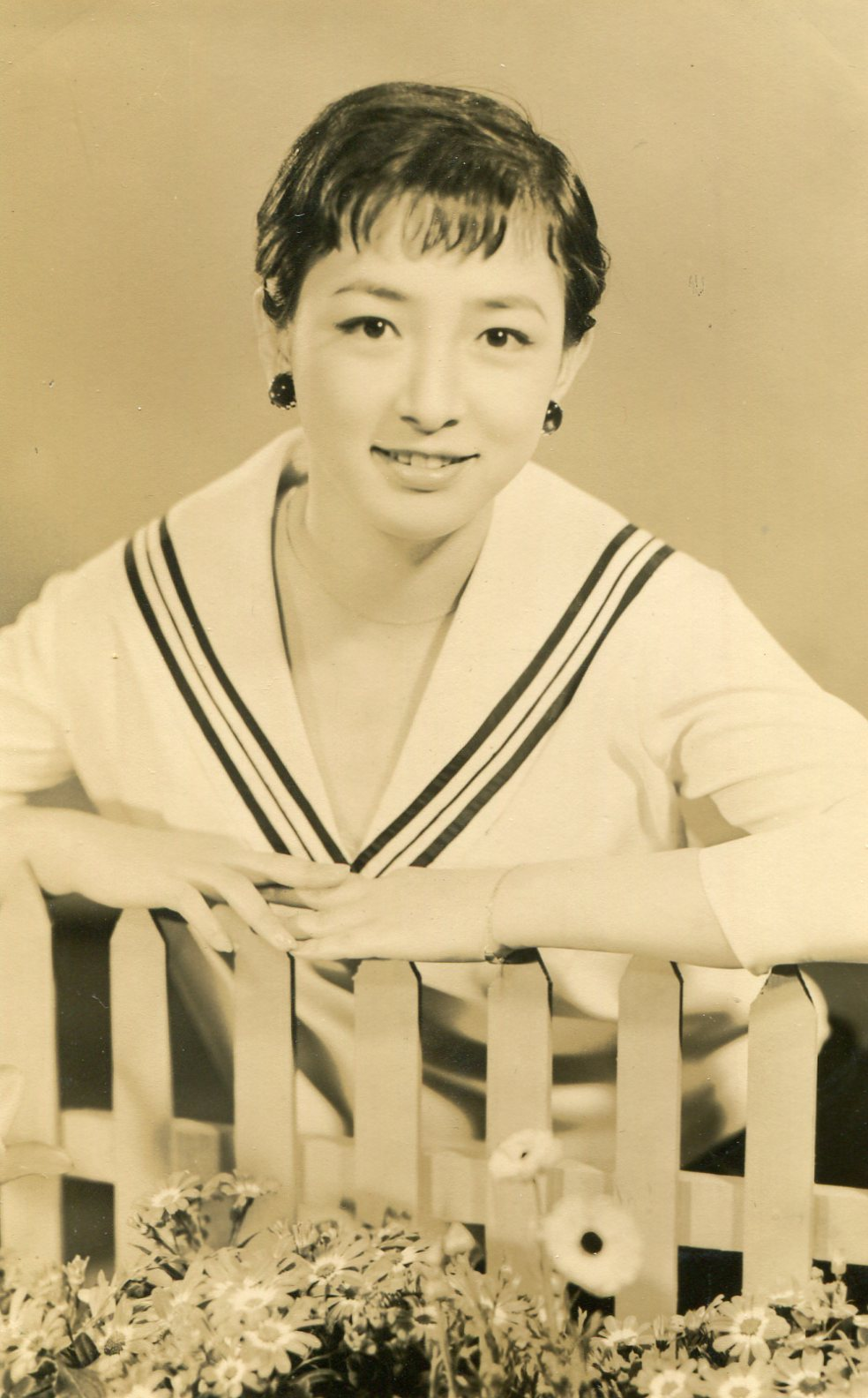
Ineko Arima (1950s)

=== Film ===
Year	Title	Role	Director	Ref
1954	Late Chrysanthemums	Sachiko	Mikio Naruse	
1957	Black River	Shizuko	Masaki Kobayashi	
1957	Tokyo Twilight	Akiko Sugiyama	Yasujirō Ozu	
1958	Night Drum	Otane Ogura	Tadashi Imai	
1958	Equinox Flower	Setsuko Hirayama	Yasujirō Ozu	
1959	Farewell to Spring		Keisuke Kinoshita	
1959	The Human Condition	Yang Chunlan	Masaki Kobayashi	
1961	Zero Focus	Hisako Tanuma	Yoshitarō Nomura	
1962	Love Under the Crucifix	Ogin	Kinuyo Tanaka	
1962	Mitasareta seikatsu	Junko Asakura	Susumu Hani	
1963	Bushido, Samurai Saga	Maki	Tadashi Imai	
1965	Tokugawa Ieyasu	Odai no Kata	Daisuke Itō	
2001	Closed Ward	Dr. Takase	Susumu Fukuhara	
2008	Dreaming Awake	Emiko	Takeo Kimura	
2019	The Master of Funerals		Naofumi Higuchi	

=== Television ===
Year	Title	Role	Network	Notes	Ref
1969	Ten to Chi to	Matsue	NHK	Taiga drama	
1998	Tokugawa Yoshinobu		NHK	Taiga drama	
1999	Asuka		NHK	Asadora	
2017	Yasuragi no Sato	Shinobu Oikawa	TV Asahi		

== Honours ==
- Medal with Purple Ribbon (1995)
- Order of the Precious Crown, 4th Class, Wisteria (2003)
