= The Human Condition (Gomikawa novel) =

Japanese six-part novel

- Author: Junpei Gomikawa
- Language: Japanese
- Genre: Autobiographical novel
- Publication date: 1958
- Publication place: Japan

The Human Condition (人間の條件, Ningen no jōken) is a six-part novel written by Junpei Gomikawa. It was first published in Japan in 1958. The novel was an immediate bestseller and sold 2.4 million copies within its first three years after being published.

The novel is about the experience of the protagonist during World War II and is partly autobiographical. The novel is critical of Japan's role in the war. According to Naoko Shimazu, the novel is unique in that it portrays Japan as the aggressor during the war, and how the Chinese, Korean, and Japanese people themselves were victimized by those actions. Shimazu said that the novel was important for "purify[ing] the Japanese from their polluted past, by expressing their deeply held anger".

Right-wing critics in Japan criticized the novel's "sentimental humanism".

== Adaptations ==
The novel was the basis for Masaki Kobayashi's film trilogy The Human Condition, released between 1959 and 1961. It was also adapted for radio in 1958, and twice for television, first in 1962 and again in 1979, and received two manga adaptations: the first in 1983 by Seitarō Tachibana, and the second in 1988 by Shōtarō Ishinomori.

Currently, no English translation of the novel exists.
