= Masaki Kobayashi filmography =

Cataloging of published films by Masaki Kobayashi

Masaki Kobayashi was a Japanese film director, screenwriter and producer who has directed twenty films in a career spanning 33 years. He is best known for The Human Condition Trilogy, the Academy Award–nominated horror film Kwaidan and the jidaigeki films Harakiri and Samurai Rebellion.

== List of feature films ==
Year	Title	Original title	Director	Writer	Producer	Notes
1949	The Yotsuya Ghost Story	Shin'yaku Yotsuya kaidan	No	Uncredited	No	
1949	Broken Drum	Yabure-daiko	No	Yes	No	
1952	Youth of the Son	Musuko no seishun	Yes	No	No	Medium-Length film
1953	Sincere Heart	Magokoro	Yes	No	No	Completed in 1953
1954	Three Loves	Mittsu no ai	Yes	Yes	No	
1954	Somewhere Under The Broad Sky	Kono hiroi sora no dokoka ni	Yes	No	No	
1955	Beautiful Days	Uruwashiki saigetsu	Yes	No	No	
1956	The Thick-Walled Room	Kabe atsuki heya	Yes	No	No	
1956	Fountainhead (also known as The Spring)	Izumi	Yes	No	No	
1956	I Will Buy You	Anata kaimasu	Yes	No	No	
1957	Black River	Kuroi kawa	Yes	No	No	
1959	No Greater Love	Kore ijō no ai wanai	Yes	Yes	No	Part of The Human Condition: Film Series
1959	Road to Eternity	Eien e no michi	Yes	Yes	Yes	Part of The Human Condition: Film Series
1961	A Soldier's Prayer	Heishi no inori	Yes	Yes	Yes	Part of The Human Condition: Film Series
1962	The Inheritance	Karami-ai	Yes	No	Yes	
1962	Harakiri	Seppuku	Yes	No	No	
1964	Kwaidan	Kaidan	Yes	No	No	
1967	Samurai Rebellion	Jōi-uchi: Hairyō-tsuma shimatsu	Yes	No	No	
1968	Hymn to a Tired Man	Nihon no seishun	Yes	No	No	
1971	Inn of Evil	Inōchi bō ni furō	Yes	No	No	
1975	The Fossil	Kaseki	Yes	No	No	
1979	Glowing Autumn	Moeruaki	Yes	No	No	One remaining copy, kept in the National Film Archive of Japan
1983	Tokyo Trial	Tōkyō Saiban	Yes	Yes	No	Documentary film
1985	The Empty Table	Shokutaku no Nai Ie	Yes	Yes	No	Final directed film
2000	Dora-heita		No	Yes	No	Posthumous release From a screenplay written in 1969 with Kon Ichikawa, Akira Kurosawa and Keisuke Kinoshita at Yonki-no-kai Productions

=== As assistant director ===
No.	Title	Year of release	Original Title
1.	The Portrait	1948	Shōzō
2.	Apostasy	1948	Hakai
3.	The Yotsuda-Phantom (uncredited)	1949	Shinshaku Yotsuya kaidan
4.	Broken Drum	1949	Yabure daiko
5.	Carmen Comes Home	1951	Karumen kokyō ni kaeru
6.	Fireworks Over the Sea	1951	Umi no hanabi
