= Shigeru Kōyama =

Japanese actor

- 神山 繁
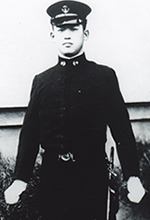
- Shigeru Kōyama at the Imperial Japanese Naval Paymaster Academy during the Second World War
- Born: 16 January 1929; Kure, Hiroshima, Japan
- Died: 3 January 2017 (aged 87); Kyoto Prefecture, Japan
- Occupation: Actor
- Years active: 1952–2015
- Spouse: Tomoko Fumino (deceased)

Shigeru Kōyama (神山 繁, Kōyama Shigeru; 16 January 1929 – 3 January 2017) was a Japanese actor.

== Career ==
Born in Kure, Hiroshima, Kōyama joined the Bungakuza theatre troupe in 1952, first as a directorial assistant and then as an actor. He made his film debut in 1953 in Tadashi Imai's An Inlet of Muddy Water. He left Bungakuza in 1963 and participated in other troupes such as Gekidan Kumo and Engeki Shūdan En. He was also well known for his role in the hit TV show The Guardman. He died in Kyoto Prefecture from pneumonia on 3 January 2017, 13 days before his 88th birthday.

== Filmography ==
=== Film ===
Year	Title	Role	Director	Notes
1953	An Inlet of Muddy Water	Unknown	Tadashi Imai	Uncredited
1958	Akujo no kisetsu	Terauchi, Assistant Professor	Minoru Shibuya	
1959	High Teen	Shinsaku, Sanae's Brother	Kazuo Inoue	
1959	Yuganda tsuki	Yura	Akinori Matsuo	
1960	Afraid to Die	Masa	Yasuzo Masumura	
1960	Kenka Tarô	Goi	Toshio Masuda	
1961	Koi ni inochi o	Li	Yasuzô Masumura	
1961	Yûhi ni akai ore no kao	Unknown	Masahiro Shinoda	
1962	Akitsu Springs	Tsuda	Yoshishige Yoshida	
1962	Namida o shishi no tategami ni	Kogure	Masahiro Shinoda	
1963	Kuro no hôkokusho	Hitomi	Yasuzô Masumura	
1963	Kyojin Ôkuma Shigenobu	Azusa Ono	Kenji Misumi	
1964	Otoko girai	Paul Okamura	Ryô Kinoshita	
1964	Adauchi	Okuno Magodayū	Tadashi Imai	
1964	Kwaidan	Unknown	Masaki Kobayashi	(segment "Chawan no naka")
1965	Nikutai no gakko	Otowa	Ryô Kinoshita	
1965	Chichi to musume no uta	Unknown	Buichi Saitô	
1966	Dark the Mountain Snow	Unknown	Zenzô Matsuyama	
1967	Samurai Rebellion	Geki Takahashi	Masaki Kobayashi	
1967	Japan's Longest Day	Susumu Katō	Kihachi Okamoto	
1968	Kubi	Tashiro	Shirô Moritani	
1968	Kill!	Tamiya Ayuzawa	Kihachi Okamoto	
1968	Saraba Mosukuwa gurentai	Unknown	Hiromichi Horikawa	
1969	Red Lion	Staff Chief Aragaki	Kihachi Okamoto	
1969	Tengu-tô	Mizuki	Satsuo Yamamoto	
1970	The Militarists	Fumimaro Konoe	Hiromichi Horikawa	
1970	Zatoichi Meets Yojimbo	Jinzaburō Wakiya	Kihachi Okamoto	
1970	Bakumatsu	Katsu Kaishū	Daisuke Itō	
1970	Fuji sanchō	Unknown	Tetsutaro Murano	
1970	Jaga wa hashitta	Unknown	Kiyoshi Nishimura	
1971	Battle of Okinawa	Akira Shimada	Kihachi Okamoto / Teruyoshi Nakano	
1971	Inn of Evil	Kaneko, Hacchôbori Officer	Masaki Kobayashi	
1973	Gokiburi deka	Mita	Tsugunobu Kotani	
1973	Japan Sinks	Hideo Yoshimura	Shirō Moritani / Teruyoshi Nakano	
1974	Karei-naru ichizoku	Wajima	Satsuo Yamamoto	
1974	Datsugoku Hiroshima satsujinshû	Unknown	Sadao Nakajima	
1974	Kaseki	Kihara	Masaki Kobayashi	
1975	Graveyard of Honor	Unknown	Kinji Fukasaku	
1975	Wagahai wa neko de aru	Tojuro Suzuki	Kon Ichikawa	
1975	Kinkanshoku	Leader of Construction Firm	Satsuo Yamamoto	
1976	Fumō Chitai	Satoi	Satsuo Yamamoto	
1976	Taiyô wa nakanai	Unknown	Jirô Iizuka	
1977	Mount Hakkoda	Major Kinomiya	Shirō Moritani	
1977	Kiri-no-hata	Tanimura, Editor	Katsumi Nishikawa	
1978	Queen Bee	Tsukumo	Kon Ichikawa	
1978	Inubue	Maekawa	Sadao Nakajima	
1978	Kôtei no inai hachigatsu	Masagaki	Satsuo Yamamoto	
1978	Blue Christmas	Unknown	Kihachi Okamoto	
1979	Taiyō o Nusunda Otoko	Nakayama	Kazuhiko Hasegawa	
1979	Tooi ashita	Chief Public Prosecutor Suda	Tatsumi Kumashiro	
1980	The Battle of Port Arthur	Yamagata Aritomo	Toshio Masuda	
1981	Willful Murder	Unknown	Kei Kumai	
1981	Imperial Navy	Takeo Kaizuka	Shūe Matsubayashi	
1982	Asuka e, soshite mada minu ko e	Unknown	Ryô Kinoshita	
1982	Kyôdan	Shuzo Morishita	Tôru Murakawa	
1982	Kono ko no nanatsu no oiwai ni	Kashiwabara	Yasuzô Masumura	
1983	Antarctica	Yūji Horigome	Kei Kumai	
1984	Sukanpin walk	Toshikazu Tamikawa	Kazuki Ohmori	
1984	Zerosen moyu	Unknown	Toshio Masuda	
1985	Ma no toki	Keiichiro, Ryoko's Husband	Yasuo Furuhata	
1985	Gray Sunset	The Doctor	Shunya Itō	
1986	Rokumeikan	Unknown	Kon Ichikawa	
1986	The Sea and Poison	Gondō	Kei Kumai	
1986	Baby Elephant Story: The Angel Who Descended to Earth	Masahiro Murakami	Ryô Kinoshita	
1987	Too Much	Police Chief	Éric Rochat	
1987	Gokudo no onna-tachi 2	Iwaki	Toru Dobashi	
1989	Daireikai: Shindara dou naru	Unknown	Akira Ishida	
1989	Black Rain	Chief Inspector Ōhashi	Ridley Scott	American film
1990	Haruka naru koshien	Unknown	Yutaka Osaka	
1990	Isan sôzoku	Tadayoshi Torii	Yasuo Furuhata	
1991	Rainbow Kids	Kunijirō Yanagawa	Kihachi Okamoto	
1991	Edo Jō Tairan	Tokugawa Mitsusada	Toshio Masuda	
1991	Kagerô	Yoneyama	Hideo Gosha	
1991	Tenkawa densetsu satsujin jiken	Yoshinori Takazaki	Kon Ichikawa	
1991	Gubbai Mama	Unknown	Yasushi Akimoto	
1992	Kantsubaki	Unknown	Yasuo Furuhata	
1992	Yamai wa kikara: Byôin e ikô 2	Kotaro Katakura	Yôjirô Takita	
1993	Bloom in the Moonlight	Rokushirō Uehara	Shinichiro Sawai	
1993	Waga ai no uta - Taki Rentaro monogatari	Unknown	Shinichiro Sawai	
1993	Sono kido o tootte	Kajima	Kon Ichikawa	
1993	Kaettekite Kogarashi Monjirô	Unknown	Kon Ichikawa	
1994	47 Ronin	Onodera Hidekazu	Kon Ichikawa	
1995	Himeyuri no Tô	Schoolmaster Noguchi	Seijirō Kōyama	
1995	Kura	Unknown	Yasuo Furuhata	
1995	Onihei hankachô	Unknown	Yoshiki Onoda	
1995	Godzilla vs. Destoroyah	Army General Gotō	Takao Okawara	
1996	Yatsuhaka Mura	Dr. Kuno	Kon Ichikawa	
1998	Dr. Akagi	Unknown	Shohei Imamura	
1998	Bayside Shakedown: The Movie	Toshiaki Yoshida	Katsuyuki Motohiro	
1998	Diary of Early Winter Shower	Nomura	Shin'ichirô Sawai	
1999	Niji no misaki	Unknown	Masahiko Okumura	
2000	Dora-heita	Honda Ikki	Kon Ichikawa	
2001	Red Shadow	Kanemitsu Kyougoku	Hiroyuki Nakano	
2001	Sennen no Koi Story of Genji	Fujiwara no Tametoki	Tonkō Horikawa	
2002	Misutâ rûkî	Narita	Satoshi Isaka	
2003	Bayside Shakedown 2	Toshiaki Yoshida	Katsuyuki Motohiro	
2003	The Man in White	Unknown	Takashi Miike	
2005	Azumi 2: Death or Love	Tenkai	Shusuke Kaneko	
2006	I Am Nipponjin	Unknown	Takashi Tsukinoki	
2007	Hokushin naname ni sasu tokoro	Honda	Seijirô Kôyama	
2009	Shizumanu Taiyō	President Hiyama	Setsurō Wakamatsu	
2012	Beyond Outrage	Fuse	Takeshi Kitano	

=== Television ===
Year	Title	Role	Network	Notes
1965	Taikōki	Yamanaka Shikanosuke	NHK	Taiga drama
1965	The Guardman (TV series)	NHK		
1970	Mominoki wa Nokotta	Mizuno Jūrōzaemon	NHK	Taiga drama
1978	Ōgon no Hibi	Ankokuji Ekei	NHK	Taiga drama
1980	Shishi no Jidai	Iwashita Michihira	NHK	Taiga drama
1981	Onna Taikōki	Honda Masanobu	NHK	Taiga drama
1981	Sekigahara	Ankokuji Ekei	TBS	
1987	Dokuganryū Masamune	Endō Motonobu	NHK	Taiga drama
1988	Sanbiki ga Kiru!	Bessho Tanomo	TV Asahi	
1990	Tobu ga Gotoku	Ii Naosuke	NHK	Taiga drama
1990-93	Shogun Iemitsu Shinobi Tabi	Okubo Hikozaemon	TV Asahi	
2000	Aoi Tokugawa Sandai	Honda Masanobu	NHK	Taiga drama
2002	Hero	Sakanoue	Fuji TV	
2006	Fugo Keiji	Ryūzō Katayama	TV Asahi	
2008	Change	Sakae Nihei	Fuji TV	
2008	Kachō Kōsaku Shima	Tomabechi	NTV	
2009	Fumō Chitai	Mishima	Fuji TV	
2009	Tenchijin	Sen no Rikyū	NHK	Taiga drama
