= The Tokyo Trial (disambiguation) =

The Tokyo Trial, or the International Military Tribunal for the Far East, was a military tribunal after World War II.

The Tokyo Trial may also refer to:

- The Tokyo Trial (film), a 2006 Chinese film
- Tokyo Trial (miniseries), a 2016 Japanese miniseries
- International Military Tribunal for the Far East (film), a 1983 Japanese documentary film
