= Blue Ribbon Award for Best Film =

Annual award from Association of Tokyo Film Journalists

- Awarded for: Best Performance by a Film
- Country: Japan
- Presented by: The Association of Tokyo Film Journalists
- First award: 1950

The Blue Ribbon Award for Best Film is a prize recognizing excellence in Japanese film. It is awarded annually by the Association of Tokyo Film Journalists as one of the Blue Ribbon Awards. Filmmakers Akira Kurosawa, Tadashi Imai and Mikio Naruse are among those who have received the award. Best Film winners Kagemusha (1980) and The Twilight Samurai (2002) also received an Academy Award nomination in the category of Best Foreign Language Film.

== List of winners ==
No.	Year	Film	Director
1	1950	Until We Meet Again	Tadashi Imai
2	1951	Repast	Mikio Naruse
3	1952	Lightning	Mikio Naruse
4	1953	An Inlet of Muddy Water	Tadashi Imai
5	1954	Twenty-Four Eyes	Keisuke Kinoshita
6	1955	Floating Clouds	Mikio Naruse
7	1956	Mahiru no ankoku	Tadashi Imai
8	1957	The Rice People	Tadashi Imai
9	1958	The Hidden Fortress	Akira Kurosawa
10	1959	Kiku to Isamu	Tadashi Imai
11	1960	Her Brother	Kon Ichikawa
12	1961	Pigs and Battleships	Shohei Imamura
13	1962	Foundry Town	Kirio Urayama
14	1963	The Insect Woman	Shohei Imamura
15	1964	The Woman in the Dunes	Hiroshi Teshigahara
16	1965	Red Beard	Akira Kurosawa
17	1966	Shiroi Kyotō	Satsuo Yamamoto
18	1975	The Fossil	Masaki Kobayashi
19	1976	Lullaby of the Earth	Yasuzo Masumura
20	1977	The Yellow Handkerchief	Yoji Yamada
21	1978	Third Base	Yōichi Higashi
22	1979	Vengeance Is Mine	Shōhei Imamura
23	1980	Kagemusha	Akira Kurosawa
24	1981	Muddy River	Kōhei Oguri
25	1982	Fall Guy	Kinji Fukasaku
26	1983	Tokyo Trial	Masaki Kobayashi
27	1984	MacArthur's Children	Masahiro Shinoda
28	1985	Ran	Akira Kurosawa
29	1986	House of Wedlock	Kichitaro Negishi
30	1987	A Taxing Woman	Juzo Itami
31	1988	The Silk Road	Junya Satō
32	1989	Dotsuitarunen	Junji Sakamoto
33	1990	Childhood Days	Masahiro Shinoda
34	1991	A Scene at the Sea	Takeshi Kitano
35	1992	Sumo Do, Sumo Don't	Masayuki Suo
36	1993	All Under the Moon	Yōichi Sai
37	1994	Like a Rolling Stone	Tatsumi Kumashiro
38	1995	A Last Note	Kaneto Shindo
39	1996	Boys Be Ambitious	Kazuyuki Izutsu
40	1997	Bounce Ko Gals	Masato Harada
41	1998	Hana-bi	Takeshi Kitano
42	1999	Gohatto	Nagisa Oshima
43	2000	Battle Royale	Kinji Fukasaku
44	2001	Spirited Away	Hayao Miyazaki
45	2002	The Twilight Samurai	Yōji Yamada
46	2003	Akame 48 Waterfalls	Genjiro Arato
47	2004	Nobody Knows	Hirokazu Koreeda
48	2005	Break Through!	Kazuyuki Izutsu
49	2006	Hula Girls	Lee Sang-il
50	2007	Kisaragi	Yūichi Satō
51	2008	Climber's High	Masato Harada
52	2009	Mt. Tsurugidake	Daisaku Kimura
53	2010	Confessions	Tetsuya Nakashima
54	2011	Cold Fish	Sion Sono
55	2012	Our Homeland	Yang Yong-hi
56	2013	The Story of Yonosuke	Shūichi Okita
57	2014	Samurai Hustle	Katsuhide Motoki
58	2015	The Emperor in August	Masato Harada
59	2016	Shin Godzilla	Hideaki Anno and Shinji Higuchi
60	2017	Wilderness	Yoshiyuki Kishi
61	2018	One Cut of the Dead	Shinichiro Ueda
62	2019	Fly Me to the Saitama	Hideki Takeuchi
63	2020	Fukushima 50	Setsurō Wakamatsu
64	2021	Last of the Wolves	Kazuya Shiraishi
65	2022	A Man	Kei Ishikawa
66	2023	Godzilla Minus One	Takashi Yamazaki
67	2024	A Samurai in Time	Jun'ichi Yasuda
68	2025	Kokuho	Lee Sang-il
