= Yūsuke Takita =

Japanese actor

- 滝田 裕介
- Born: Susumu Takita; 29 November 1930; Kitazawa, Setagaya (now Kitazawa, Setagaya, Tokyo), Ehara, Tokyo Prefecture, Japan
- Died: 3 May 2015 (aged 84); Naka-ku, Yokohama, Kanagawa Prefecture, Japan
- Occupation: Actor
- Years active: 1953–2015
- Notable work: Films; Tidal Wave; Double Suicide; Stage; Inōtadataka Monogatari; Carousel
- Television: Dramas; Jiken Kisha; Hosou de Hanjōki; Ōoka Echizen; Dramas (dubbed); Ben Casey; ER

Susumu Takita (滝田 進, Takita Susumu; 29 November 1930 – 3 May 2015), known by the stage name Yūsuke Takita (滝田 裕介, 祐介, Takita Yūsuke), was a Japanese actor. He was born in Kitazawa, Setagaya (now Kitazawa, Setagaya, Tokyo), Ehara, Tokyo Prefecture. He formerly belonged to Gekidan Haiyūza.

== Biography ==
After dropping out of Waseda University's department of theater, Takita debuted in 1953 as a second-grader training institute for Gekidan Haiyūza. His synchronization included Akiji Kobayashi, Akio Satake, Toru Takeuchi, Yoshio Tsuchiya, Hisashi Yokomori, etc. Takita became popular in the TV drama Jiken Kisha who appeared from 1956 to 1964. In the period dramas such as Mito Kōmon and The Unfettered Shogun, he often played villains, but in recent years there were many opportunities to play the role of good people. In addition, Takita was also active as a voice actor, voice of neurosurgeon Ben Casey of hero in overseas drama Ben Casey, and the films Star Wars, Haunted Mansion, Jaws and many hit the main characters and important characters' voices in hits.

Takita was diagnosed with ureter cancer in the summer of 2014 and had surgery. Takita's metastasis was discovered in April 2015. He died at a hospital in Naka Ward, Yokohama City on 3 May, the same year at 11:34 am, from cancer. Takita was 84 when he died.

== Filmography (acting) ==
=== TV dramas ===
Year	Title	Role	Network
1958	Mammoth Tower		KR
1958	Jiken Kisha	Ina (Ina-chan)	NHK
1963	Hakuchū no Shikaku		CX
1965	The Guard Man		TBS
1966	Ultra Q	Hayama	TBS
1966	Aru Yūki no Kiroku	Miyaguchi Cap	NET
1970	Key Hunter		TBS
1970	Hosou de Hanjōki	Shogo Harada	YTV
1971	Opal to Sapphire		NTV
1971	Daichūshingura	Tsujimura Heizaemon	NET
1971	Mizu no Honō		TBS, CBC
1971	Ki ni naru Yome-san	Hanaoka	NTV
1971	Ōoka Echizen		TBS
1972	Mito Kōmon		TBS
1972	Kōya no Surōnin		NET
1972	Hasegawa Shin Series	Tatsusaburo	NET
1973	Edo o Kiru		TBS
1973	Oshizamurai: Kiichihōgen	Denjiro Sakaki	NTV
1974	Kizudarake no Tenshi	Isozaki	NTV
1975	Birdie Dai Sakusen		TBS
1975	Kagedōshin		MBS
1976	Fūfu Tabi Nikki: Saraba Rōnin		CX
1976	Hi no Michi		NHK
1976	Dai Tokai: Tatakai no Hibi	Hiroshi Yamanobe	NTV
1977	Otokotachi no Tabiji		NHK
1977	G-Men '75		TBS
1977	Tokusō Saizensen		ANB
1977	Dai Tokai Part II	Kiyosato Yamamoto	NTV
1978	Momotarō-zamurai	Kisoya	NTV
1978	Hissatsu Series		ABC
1978	Kyūkei no Arano		CX
1978	Abarenbō Shōgun		ANB
1979	Ashita no Keiji		TBS
1979	Taiyō ni Hoero!		NTV
1979	Yabure Shinkurō	Judayu Morikawa	ANB
1979	Yūrei Series 3: Zennin-mura no Yūrei matsuri	Osawa	ANB
1981	Musuko Koroshi		ANB
1981	Keishichō Satsujin-ka		ANB
1982	Tōge no Gunzō	Murata Kanuemon	NHK
1982	Seicho Matsumoto no Usugeshō no Otoko		ANB
1983	Tokugawa Ieyasu	Ankokuji Ekei	NHK
1983	Umi ni kakeru Niji: Yamamoto Isoroku to Nippon Kaigun		TX
1983	Medaka no Uta		TBS
1983	Zenigata Heiji	Morikawa	CX
1985	Tantei Kyosuke Kamizu no Satsujin Suiri 2 Kage Naki Onna		ANB
1986	Murder at Mt. Fuji	Shige Kazutsuji	CX
1988	Takeda Shingen	Uesugi Norimasa	NHK
1988	Jun Ai		TBS
1988	New Jungle	Senmu Onuki	NTV
1989	Kasuga Notsubone	Torii Mototada	NHK
1989	Sanbiki ga Kiru!	Tamesada Gojo	ANB
1989	Ki Heitai	Kikkawa Tsunemasa	NTV
1990	Edo Nakamachi Bugyōsho	Rokubee Kasai	TX
1990	Kamiya Genjirōtorimonohikae	Uhee Nagatoya	CX
1990	Happyaku Yachōyume Nikki	Kenmotsu Katakura	NTV
1991	Hagure Keijijunjōha		ANB, EX
1992	Nobunaga King Of Zipangu	Torii Tadayoshi	NHK
1992	Sasurai Keiji Ryojō-hen V		ANB
1992	Shuhei Asahina Mystery 3 Tango-ji Satsujin Jiken	Toshiyuki Urabe	NTV
1993	Yami o Kiru! Ōedo Hanka-chō	Hidarinaka Hotta	NTV
1993	Mei Bugyō: Tōyama no Kin-san	Genzaemon Owariya	ANB
1994	Oda Nobunaga	Azai Hisamasa	TX
1995	Hachidai Shōgun Yoshimune	Akimoto Takatomo	NHK
1995	Onihei Hankachō	Shingorō Haraguchi	CX
1997	Ultraman Tiga	Eiji Tsuburaya	MBS
1998	Minami Machibugyō Jiken Jō: Okore! Motome		TBS
1998	Tokugawa Yoshinobu	Nagahara Jinshichirō	NHK
1998	Keibuho: Jiro Tsukuda 6 Kobin ni Tsumeta shi	Sotaro Tanno	NTV
1999	Shiori Densetsu: Star Tanjō		CBC
2000	Strangers in the City		ANB
2013	Tada's Do-It-All House	Landlord	TX
2013	Sasurai Shochō Shohei Kazama 10 Sumida Narihirabashi Satsujin Jiken	Yoshitaro Ichikawa	TX

=== Films ===
Year	Title	Role
1955	Kakinoki no aru Ie	Teacher
1956	Mori wa Ikiteiru	Security captain
1959	The Beast to Die	Reporter Endo
1960	Robō no Ishi	Yasukichi
1963	Kaze no Shisen	Tamotsu Nagaoki
1967	Nakano School	Motohiro So
1968	Sex Check: Daini no Sei	Masao Mineshige
1969	Double Suicide	Magoemon
1969	Hitokiri	Geki Hiramatsu
1970	Kage no Kuruma	Hamajima's uncle
1970	Men and War: Part I	Morito Morishima
1971	Battle of Okinawa	Kyoyu Nakazone
1971	Kuro no Shamen	Toyama
1971	Inn of Evil	Nadaya no Kodaira
1971	Silence	Ichizou
1972	The Long Darkness	Yukifusa Kimura
1973	Shiogaritōge	Kazuma Iki
1973	Submersion of Japan	Associate Professor Nobuhiko Yukinaga
1976	Fumō Chitai	Textile Department Manager Yamamoto
1976	Yoake no Hata: Jiichiro Matsumoto Den	Jinana Matsumoto
1979	Gassan	Tasuke
1979	Haitatsu sa renai San-tsū no Tegami	Director Kashiwabara
1980	Jishin Rettō	Middle-aged office worker
1980	Warui yatsu-ra	Bank manager
1981	Willful Murder	Kenji Kawase
1981	Chikagoro naze ka Charleston	Police chief
1982	Kyōdan	Director Tsunoda
1982	Kaikyō	Associate Professor
1982	Tōno Monogatari	Tokutaro
1984	Kūkai	Fujiwara no Tadanushi
2007	Hokushin Naname ni sasutokoro	Satoshi Murata

=== Stage ===
Title
Inōtadataka Monogatari
Oliver!
Carousel
And Then There Were None
German
Mori wa Ikiteiru
Broadway kara 45-byō

=== Advertisements ===
Brand	Product
Myojo Foods	

== Voice acting ==
=== Dubbing ===
==== Actors ====
Roy Scheider

Title	Role
Jaws	Martin Brody
Jaws 2	Martin Brody
Jaws: The Revenge	Martin Brody
The Peacekeeper	Robert Baker

==== Films, dramas ====
Title	Role	Actor
ER	David Green	John Cullum
Gone with the Wind	Ashley Wilkes	Leslie Howard
Gran Torino	Walt Kowalski	Clint Eastwood
Columbo	Dexter Paris / Norman Paris	Martin Landau
12 Angry Men	Juror #8	Jack Lemmon
Star Wars	Obi-Wan Kenobi	Alec Guinness
The Empire Strikes Back	Obi-Wan Kenobi	Alec Guinness
Return of the Jedi	Obi-Wan Kenobi	Alec Guinness
On Golden Pond	Norman Sear Jr.	Henry Fonda
To Catch a Thief	John Lobby	Cary Grant
National Treasure	John Adams Gates	Christopher Plummer
No Escape	Father	Lance Henriksen
The Haunted Mansion	Ramsley	Terence Stamp
Hamlet	Hamlet	Laurence Olivier
Ben Casey	Ben Casey	Vince Edwards
Hidalgo	Sheikh Riyadh	Omar Sharif

=== Anime films ===
Year	Title	Role
1995	Anne no Nikki	Albert Dussel

=== Radio dramas ===
Year	Title	Network
2001	FM Theater "Tsuyukusa"	NHK-FM

=== Narration ===
Year	Title	Network
1979	Bungotori Monochō	TV Asahi
1997	Kusakari Jūjigun	
