= Hisashi Sagara =

Japanese film editor (died 1980)

- 相良 久
- Born: Hisashi Takahashi (高橋 久, Takahashi Hisashi)
- Died: December 14, 1980
- Occupation: Film editor
- Years active: 1937–1971

Hisashi Sagara (相良 久, Sagara Hisashi; died December 14, 1980), born Hisashi Takahashi (高橋 久, Takahashi Hisashi), was a Japanese film editor. He is best remembered for his five collaborations with director Masaki Kobayashi: Love Under the Crucifix, Harakiri (both 1962), Kwaidan (1964), Samurai Rebellion (1967), and Inn of Evil (1971). Active from 1937 to 1971, his other credits included Apostasy (1948), Battle of Roses, Sakon torimonochō: senketsu no tegata (both 1950), and Twin Sisters of Kyoto (1963).

== Filmography ==
- Boko no hanagata (1937) - Editor
- Hadaka no machi (1937)
- Etchan butai (1938) - Story
- Sugikyo no saiminjutsu (1938)
- Roadside Stone (1938)
- Bakuon (1939)
- The Power of Women (1939)
- Apostasy (1948)
- Ishimatsu of the Forest (1949)
- Yotsuya Kaidan Part 1 (1949)
- Yotsuya Kaidan Part 2 (1949)
- A Broken Drum (1949)
- Fūun Konpira-san (1950)
- Battle of Roses (1950)
- Sakon torimonochō: senketsu no tegata (1950)
- The Foster Mother (1951)
- Kedamono no yado (1951)
- Hana fuku kaze (1953)
- Hana fubuki: Gozonji shichinin otoko (1954)
- Shichihenge tanuki goten (1954)
- Gokumoncho (1955)
- Ejima Ikushima (1955)
- Ruten (1956)
- Tsuruhachi Tsurujiro (1956)
- Utau yajikita ogon dochu (1957)
- Kao (1957)
- A Tale of Dung and Urine (1957)
- Dai Chushingura (1957)
- Akagi no komori-uta (1957)
- Suttobi gojûsan tsugi (1958)
- Taikoki (1958)
- Dai Tokyo tanjo - Oedo no kane (1958)
- Rakka kenko-roku (1958)
- Hana wa nagekazu dai 1, 2, 3-bu (1958)
- Edo yumin den (1959)
- Shura zakura (1959)
- Yajikita minyo dochu: Oshu kaido no maki (1959)
- Shiroi kiba (1960)
- Waga ai (1960)
- One After Another (1961)
- The Country Boss (1962)
- Love Under the Crucifix (1962)
- Harakiri (1962)
- Twin Sisters of Kyoto (1963)
- Zangiku monogatari (1963)
- Kwaidan (1964)
- Samurai Rebellion (1967)
- Maboroshi no satsui (1971)
- Inn of Evil (1971)
