= Battle of Roses =

1950 Japanese film

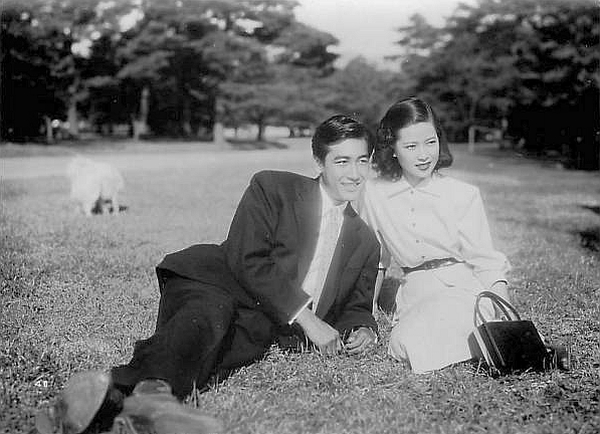
- 薔薇合戦
- Directed by: Mikio Naruse
- Written by: Motosada Nishiki; Fumio Niwa {novel)
- Produced by: Shigeki Sugiyama
- Cinematography: Haruo Takeno
- Edited by: Hisashi Sagara
- Music by: Seiichi Suzuki
- Production companies: Shochiku; Eiga Geijutsu Kyōkai (Note: The Eiga Geijutsu Kyōkai ("Film Art Association") was a film production company founded by Naruse, Akira Kurosawa, Kajirō Yamamoto and Senkichi Taniguchi, which existed from 1948 to 1951.)
- Distributed by: Shochiku
- Release date: 28 October 1950 (Japan)
- Running time: 98 minutes
- Country: Japan
- Language: Japanese

Battle of Roses (Japanese: 薔薇合戦, romanized: Bara kassen) is a 1950 Japanese drama film directed by Mikio Naruse. It is based on the pre-war novel Bara kassen by Fumio Niwa.

== Cast ==
- Kuniko Miyake
- Setsuko Wakayama
- Yōko Katsuragi
- Kōji Tsuruta
- Tōru Abe
- Mitsuo Nagata
- Yōko Wakasugi
- Shirō Ōsaka
- Noriko Sengoku
- Hanshiro Iwai
- Eitarō Shindō
- Toshiko Ayukawa
- Haruo Inoue
- Shigeo Shizuyama
- Hiroshi Aoyama

== Reception ==
Naruse biographer Catherine Russell rated Battle of Roses a lesser work by its director, which seemed "to have been hastily put together, with some surprisingly abrupt editing and a rather poor script […] drawing on the sensationalism of the “liberated” woman.
