= Ichirō Nakatani =

Japanese actor (1930–2004)

- Born: April 1, 1930; Hokkaido, Empire of Japan
- Died: April 1, 2004 (aged 74)
- Occupation: Actor
- Years active: 1956–1999

Ichirō Nakatani (Japanese: 中谷 一郎, Hepburn: Nakatani Ichirō; born April 1, 1930) was a Japanese actor. He attended Waseda University, but withdrew before completing his degree and joined the Haiyuza Theatre Company. In 1959, Nakatani won Elan d'or Award for Newcomer of the Year. Nakatani was well known for his role as Ninja Kazaguruma no Yahichi in the jidaigeki drama Mito Kōmon.

== Selected filmography ==
=== Film ===
- Shujinsen (1956)
- Rodan (1956) - Senkichi, miner, killed by Meganuron (uncredited)
- Sanjûrokunin no jôkyaku (1957) - Yamaoka
- Kampai! Miai kekkon (1958)
- Lucky Dragon No. 5 (1959) - Squad Leader
- The Last Gunfight (1960) - Tsugiseki Mochizuki
- Seppun dorobô (1960)
- Aoi yaju (1960) - Goda
- Fundoshi isha (1960) - Genta
- Dokuritsu gurentai nishi-e (1960)
- Kane-dukuri taikô-ki (1960) - Yûji Hirayama
- Ankokugai no dankon (1961) - Shizuo Komatsu
- Nasake muyo no wana (1961) - Izaki, police detective
- Kaoyaku akatsukini shisu (1961)
- Atomic no obon: Surimasuwayo no maki (1961)
- Yojimbo (1961) - First Samurai
- Atomic no obon, onna oyabuntaiketsu no maki (1961)
- Ankokugai gekimetsu meirei (1961) - Kamiya
- Josei jishin (1962) - Shinkichi Sakagami
- Dobunezumi sakusen (1962)
- Harakiri (1962) - Hayato Yazaki
- Yama-neko sakusen (1962)
- Ankokugai no kiba (1962)
- Attack Squadron! (1963)
- Sengoku yarô (1963)
- Otoko no monshô (1963)
- Hiken (1963)
- Zokû otoko no monshô (1963)
- Aa bakudan (1964) - Yasaburo Yatou
- Nemuri Kyôshirô: Joyôken (1964) - Takebe
- Kwaidan (1964) - (segment "Miminashi Hôichi no hanashi")
- Yuhi no okâ (1964)
- Otoko no monshô - fuun futatsu ryu (1964)
- Otoko no monsho: hana to nagadosu (1964)
- Kuroi kaikyo (1964) - Tetsuji Onuki
- Zoku Abashiri bangaichi (1965)
- Abashiri bangaichi: Bôkyô hen (1965)
- Supai (1965)
- Gohiki no shinshi (1966)
- The Sword of Doom (1966) - Bunnojo Utsuki
- Nemuri Kyôshirô: Tajôken (1966)
- By a Man's Face Shall You Know Him (1966)
- The Betrayal (1966)
- Heitai yakuza datsugoku (1966)
- Nihon ânkokugai (1966)
- 'Kûhaku no kiten' yori: Onna wa fukushû suru (1966) - Detective Takarai
- Tonogata goyôjin (1966)
- Futeki na âitsu (1966)
- Samurai Wolf II (1967) - Ikkaku
- Japan's Longest Day (1967) - First Lieutnenant Kuroda
- Aru koroshiya no kagi (1967)
- Abashiri bangaichi: Fubuki no tôsô (1967) - Nankai
- Taiketsu (1967)
- Teppô denraiki (1968) - Sakuji
- Isoroku (1968) - (uncredited)
- Ama-kuzure (1968) - Goro
- The Human Bullet (1968)
- Kanto onna yakuza (1968)
- Outlaw:Black Dagger (1968)
- Boruneo taisho: Akamichi ni tokero (1969)
- Hitokiri (1969)
- Red Lion (1969) - Narrator (voice)
- Tengu-tô (1969) - Chôgorô
- Shinsengumi (1969) - Moribe Tani
- Gonin no Shôkin Kasegi (1969) - Mondo Shibaike
- Kanto onna do konjo (1969)
- Nemuri Kyōshirō manji giri (1969)
- Fuji sanchō (1970)
- Gekido no showashi 'Gunbatsu' (1970) - Sano (uncredited)
- Wakamono no hata (1970)
- Koroshiya ninbetsucho (1970)
- Gokuaku bozu nenbutsu sandangiri (1970)
- Deka monogatari (1971)
- Zubekô banchô: Zange no neuchi mo nai (1971) - Mari's poor husband
- Kitsune no kureta akanbô (1971) - Ushigoro Umakata
- Battle of Okinawa (1971)
- Inn of Evil (1971) - Hacchôbori officer, Okajima
- Lone Wolf and Cub: Baby Cart to Hades (1972) - Yagyu Samurai
- Shinobu-ito (1973)
- The Homeless (1974)
- Orenochi wa Taninnochi (1974) - Itami
- Sandakan No. 8 (1974) - Yamamoto
- New Battles Without Honor and Humanity (1974) - Nanba
- The Fossil (1975) - Taisuke, Tajihei's brother
- Tokkan (1975) - Narrator
- Kinkanshoku (1975)
- Bodo shimane keimusho (1975)
- Zoku ningen kakumei (1976)
- Shin joshû Sasori: 701-gô (1976) - Dietman Miura
- Fumō Chitai (1976)
- Hokuriku Proxy War (1977)
- Sugata Sanshiro (1977)
- Shogun's Samurai (1978) - Gyobu Amano (Masterless Samurai)
- Dainamaito don don (1978) - Yuichi
- Blue Christmas (1978)
- Mito Kōmon (1978)
- Eireitachi no oenka: saigo no sôkeisen (1979)
- Nihon no Fixer (1979)
- Nichiren (1979)
- Imperial Navy (1981)
- Willful Murder (1981) - Toyama
- Jirô monogatari (1987)
- Rainbow Kids (1991) - President of Wakayama TV (final film role)

=== Television ===
- Sanshimai (1967)
- Mito Kōmon (1969-1999) - Kazaguruma no Yahichi
- Tasukenin Hashiru (1973) - Tsuji Hainai
- Taiyō ni Hoero! (1975 EP.149) (1986 EP.687)
- G-Men '75 (1975 EP.18) (1977 EP.111)
- Onihei Hankachō (1975)
- Edo o Kiru (1975–1976) - Chiba Shūsaku
- Tabaruzaka (1987) - Kawaji Toshiyoshi
