= The Blue Beast =

1960 film

- Theatrical poster
- Directed by: Hiromichi Horikawa
- Screenplay by: Yoshio Shirasaka
- Produced by: Sanezumi Fujimoto; Masakatsu Kaneko
- Starring: Tatsuya Nakadai; Yoko Tsukasa; Koreya Senda; Ichico Nakaya
- Cinematography: Asakazu Nakai
- Music by: Shigeru Ikeno
- Production company: Toho
- Distributed by: Toho
- Release date: 26 June 1960 (Japan)
- Country: Japan

The Blue Beast (青い野獣, Aoi Yajū) is a 1960 Japanese film directed by Hiromichi Horikawa. The film is about a former leftist activist Yashuhiko Kuroki (Tatsuya Nakadai) who becomes a right wing opportunist by betraying his co-workers and friends during a strike.

== Release ==
The Blue Beast was distributed in Japan by Toho on 26 June 1960. The film was released in the United States by Toho International with English subtitles on January 29, 1965.

== Reception ==
"Robe." of Variety described the film as a Japanese variation of A Room at the Top. The review praised Nakadai in the role while noting "impressive performances" by Yoko Tsukasa and Keiko Awaji and Koreya Senda.

== Footnotes ==
=== References ===
- Galbraith IV, Stuart (2008). The Toho Studios Story: A History and Complete Filmography. Scarecrow Press. ISBN 978-1461673743.
