= King in Limbo =

Japanese manga series

- First tankōbon volume cover
- Genre: Adventure; Science fiction; Thriller
- Manga
- Written by: Ai Tanaka
- Published by: Kodansha
- English publisher: NA: Kodansha USA
- Imprint: KCx
- Magazine: Itan (2016–2018); Comic Days (2018–2019)
- Original run: June 7, 2016 – August 9, 2019
- Volumes: 6
- icon

King in Limbo, known in Japan as Limbo the King (stylized in all caps), is a Japanese manga series written and illustrated by Ai Tanaka. It was first serialized in Kodansha's josei manga magazine Itan from June 2016 to June 2018, and Comic Days app from August 2018 to August 2019; its chapters were collected in six tankōbon volumes.

== Publication ==
Written and illustrated by Ai Tanaka, King in Limbo was first serialized in Kodansha's josei manga magazine Itan from June 7, 2016, to June 7, 2018. It was later serialized on Kodansha's online platform Comic Days from August 7, 2018, to August 9, 2019. Kodansha collected its chapters in six tankōbon volumes, released from March 1, 2018, to September 20, 2019.

In North America, the manga has been licensed for English release by Kodansha USA. It was published in three 2-in-1 omnibus volumes from January 16 to July 23, 2024.

== Reception ==
On Takarajimasha's Kono Manga ga Sugoi! list of best manga of 2018 for female readers, the series ranked 16th, tied alongside Nireko's Sketch by Masane Kamoi. The American Library Association named the first omnibus volume of King in Limbo as one of the best graphic novels for adults of 2024.

Reviewing the first omnibus volume, Merve Giray of Comics Beat praised the intricacies of the depiction of entering someone else's mind as "smart and thought-provoking". She also noted the variety in the characters' physical features and in the female characters' occupations. She described the art as having intricate backgrounds that give a clear sense of space and "clean with slick lines".

== See also ==
- Apple Children of Aeon, another manga series by the same author
- Tengu no Daidokoro, another manga series by the same author
