= Tengu no Daidokoro =

Japanese manga series and its adaptation

- First tankōbon volume cover, featuring (from left to right) On Iizuna, Mugi, and Motoi Iizuna

天狗の台所
- Genre: Cooking; Fantasy
- Manga
- Written by: Ai Tanaka
- Published by: Kodansha
- Imprint: Afternoon KC
- Magazine: Monthly Afternoon
- Original run: September 25, 2021 – present
- Volumes: 8
- Television drama
- Directed by: Kakeru Nagashima; Hikota Shimoda; Hirokawa Hayashida; Hayato Kawai
- Written by: Yukiko Sode; Yoshitatsu Yamada; Chihiro Amano; Hiromu Kumamoto; Miharu Nara
- Music by: VaVa
- Original network: BS-TBS, BS-TBS 4K
- Original run: October 5, 2023 – present
- Episodes: 20
- icon

Tengu no Daidokoro (Japanese: 天狗の台所; lit. 'Tengu's Kitchen') is a Japanese manga series written and illustrated by Ai Tanaka. It has been serialized in Kodansha's seinen manga magazine Monthly Afternoon since September 2021. A ten-episode television drama adaptation aired from October to December 2023; a second ten-episode season aired from October to December 2024, and a third season premiered in October 2026.

== Plot ==
Just before his 14th birthday, On Iizuna learns from his parents that he is descended from the legendary Tengu, and that he must follow their custom of living in seclusion for one year once he turns 14. Traveling from New York City to Japan, On meets his older brother and fellow Tengu, Motoi, who lives in a rural farm away from civilization despite being located in the middle of Tokyo. Together, with a mystical talking family dog named Mugi, On adapts to his new agricultural way of life.

== Characters ==
On Iizuna (飯綱 オン, Iizuna On)
Portrayed by: Keitatsu Koshiyama
Motoi Iizuna (飯綱 基, Iizuna Motoi)
Portrayed by: Kiita Komagine; Haruto Shiratori (age 14)
Mugi (むぎ)
Portrayed by: Akihiro Kakuta (voice)
Yui Atago (愛宕 有意, Atago Yui)
Portrayed by: Akihisa Shiono; Yūta Ichimura (age 14)
Shikiko Iizuna (飯綱 式子, Iizuna Shikiko)
Portrayed by: Yōko Asaji
Ellis Wilson (エリス・ウィルソン, Erisu Wiruson)
Portrayed by: Taizo Harada
Ichino Iizuna Wilson (一乃・飯綱・ウィルソン, Ichino Iizuna Wiruson)
Portrayed by: Makiko Watanabe
Rentarō Atago (愛宕 連太郎, Atago Rentarō)
Portrayed by: Hirotarō Honda
Tamao Hirayama (比良山 珠緒, Hirayama Tamao)
Portrayed by: Kirari Murayama

== Media ==
=== Manga ===
Written and illustrated by Ai Tanaka, Tengu no Daidokoro started in Kodansha's seinen manga magazine Monthly Afternoon on September 25, 2021. Kodansha has collected its chapters into individual tankōbon volumes. The first volume was released on September 22, 2022. As of October 22, 2026, eight volumes have been released.

==== Volumes ====
No.	Release date	ISBN
1	September 22, 2022	978-4-06-529151-1
2	February 21, 2023	978-4-06-530561-4
3	September 22, 2023	978-4-06-532974-0
4	May 22, 2024	978-4-06-535461-2
5	October 22, 2024	978-4-06-537538-9
6	July 23, 2025	978-4-06-540027-2
7	April 23, 2026	978-4-06-543098-9
8	October 22, 2026	978-4-06-545161-8

=== Drama ===
In August 2023, a ten-episode television drama adaptation was announced. It was broadcast on BS-TBS and BS-TBS 4K from October 5 to December 7 of the same year. It was directed by Kakeru Nagashima, Hikota Shimoda, Hirokawa Hayashida, and Hayato Kawai, with scripts by Yukiko Sode, Yoshitatsu Yamada, Chihiro Amano, Hiromu Kumamoto, and Miharu Nara, and music composed by VaVa.

In June 2024, it was announced that the series was renewed for a second ten-episode season, which aired from October 22 to December 24 of the same year.

In April 2026, it was announced that the series would receive a third season. The season will tell an original story (not previously told in the manga) with supervision by Tanaka. It premiered on October 1, 2026.

== See also ==
- Apple Children of Aeon, another manga series by the same author
- King in Limbo, another manga series by the same author
