= Tatsuya Nakadai =

Japanese actor (1932–2025)

Junior Third Rank Tatsuya Nakadai
- 仲代 達矢
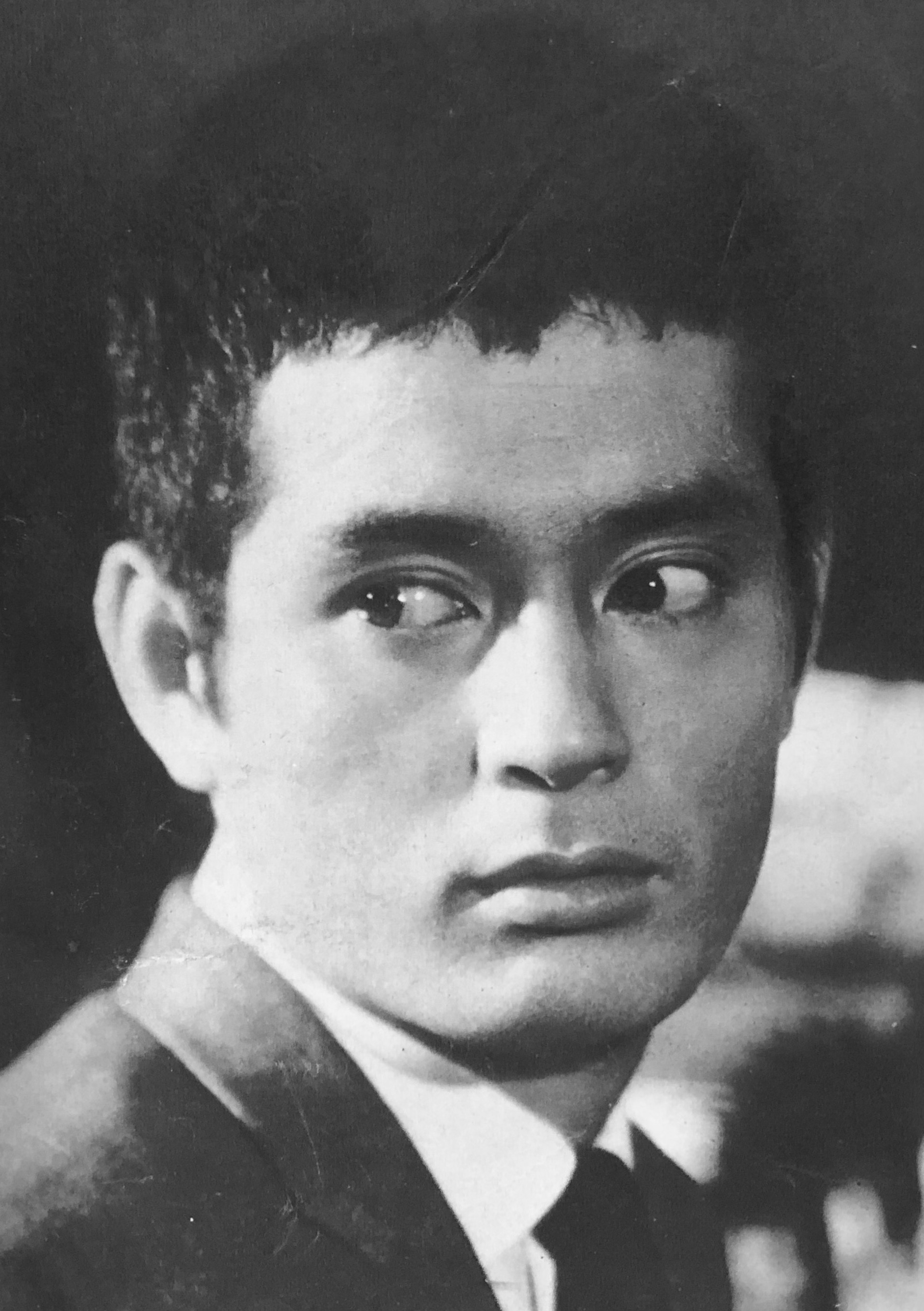
- Born: Motohisa Nakadai (仲代 元久, Nakadai Motohisa); December 13, 1932; Meguro, Tokyo, Empire of Japan
- Died: November 8, 2025 (aged 92); Tokyo, Japan
- Occupation: Actor
- Years active: 1952–2025
- Spouse: Yasuko Miyazaki (m. 1957; died 1996)
- Children: 1
- Honours: Medal with Purple Ribbon (1996); Order of Culture (2015)

Tatsuya Nakadai (仲代 達矢, Nakadai Tatsuya; born Motohisa Nakadai; December 13, 1932 – November 8, 2025) was a Japanese actor. Widely regarded as one of the greatest actors in the history of cinema, he collaborated extensively with many of Japan's best-known and acclaimed directors. In his over seven decade career, he appeared in more than 160 films, and received numerous accolades. He was honored with a Medal with Purple Ribbon in 1996 and Japan's Order of Culture in 2015.

Discovered on the streets of Tokyo by director Masaki Kobayashi, Nakadai rose to prominence starring in Kobayashi's films, with his breakthrough being in the epic anti-war trilogy The Human Condition (1959–1961). He won the Blue Ribbon Award for Best Actor for his performance as the vengeful ronin in Harakiri (1962), a role he considered his finest. Nakadai collaborated on eleven films with Kobayashi—including Kwaidan (1964) and Samurai Rebellion (1967)—and five with Akira Kurosawa, most notably as the doomed warlord in Ran (1985), a performance that earned global acclaim. His other notable credits include Seven Samurai (1954), Conflagration (1958), When a Woman Ascends the Stairs (1960), Yojimbo (1961), Sanjuro (1962), High and Low (1963), The Sword of Doom, The Face of Another (both 1966), Kill! (1968), Goyokin (1969), Kagemusha (1980), and The Tale of the Princess Kaguya (2013).

A lifelong stage actor, he founded the acting school Mumeijuku in 1975 and continued performing on stage into his nineties.

== Early life ==
Tatsuya Nakadai was born on December 13, 1932, in Tokyo as the second of four children and was raised in Chiba. His father worked as a bus driver, and after his death in 1941 due to tuberculosis, the family moved to Aoyama. His mother eventually began working as a live-in employee at a law firm in the Aoyama area of Akasaka Ward (now Minato Ward, Tokyo), and he transferred to Seinan Elementary School in Aoyama Minamimachi. During the war, he left his mother in Aoyama and evacuated to Daijisan Eikyuin Shoo-ji Temple in Sengawa, Chofu City. He often expressed his dissatisfaction with this situation. He later moved to Chitose-Karasuyama in the neighboring Setagaya Ward.

== Career ==
As a young man, Nakadai took up acting as a student at the Haiyuza Training School. He made a brief and uncredited cameo in Akira Kurosawa's Seven Samurai where he is seen for a few seconds as a samurai walking through town. Nakadai's role in Seven Samurai was technically his debut as The Thick-Walled Room's release was delayed for three years due to controversial subject matter. His major breakthrough as an actor came when he was given the part of Jo, a young yakuza in Black River, another film directed by Kobayashi. Nakadai continued to work with Kobayashi into the 1960s and won his first Blue Ribbon Award for his role in Harakiri (his personal favorite among his own films) as the aging rōnin Hanshiro Tsugumo.

He appeared in the Italian film Today We Kill... Tomorrow We Die! (1968), playing an American villain of Mexican-Indian descent rather than Asian descent. In the 1960s, he became a representative of the declining film industry and established himself in the theater world as a leading actor for the Haiyuza Theatre Company.

Nakadai appeared in two more Kurosawa films in the 1980s. In Kagemusha, Nakadai plays both the titular thief turned body-double and the famous daimyō Takeda Shingen whom the thief is tasked with impersonating. This dual role helped him win his second Blue Ribbon Award for Best Actor. In Ran, Nakadai plays another daimyō, Hidetora Ichimonji (loosely based on King Lear from Shakespeare's play King Lear and inspired by the historical daimyō Mōri Motonari).

He was also active in stage. His final performance was in May 2025 in Noto, Ishikawa, as part of a stage tour.

In 1975, he founded the acting school Mumeijuku with his wife Yasuko Miyazaki. There, he taught and trained promising young actors including Kōji Yakusho, Mayumi Wakamura, Azusa Watanabe, and Kenichi Takitō, among others. In 1996, he received the Medal with Purple Ribbon, and in 2015, he received the Order of Culture.

== Personal life ==
Nakadai and his wife experienced loss of a stillborn child in 1962. In 1978, he and Yasuko adopted Yasuko's niece Nao as a daughter because of the divorce of his sister-in-law Fusako and Fuji Television announcer Takeo Yamakawa.

== Death ==
Nakadai died from pneumonia in a Tokyo hospital on November 8, 2025, at the age of 92. His death was disclosed three days later, on November 11. Some sources erroneously claimed that he died on November 11, however, according to his talent agency, he died at 12:25 a.m. on November 8 (Japan Standard Time). He had been hospitalized two weeks prior to his death due to injuries. His daughter was at his side at the time of his death. It was announced that his funeral and memorial service would be held over the coming days, and that it would only be open to close relatives.

== Filmography ==
=== Film ===
Year	Title	Role	Director	Notes	Ref.
1953	The Thick-Walled Room	Prisoner	Masaki Kobayashi	Released 1956; uncredited	
1954	Seven Samurai	Samurai Wandering Through Town	Akira Kurosawa	Uncredited	
1956	Hi no tori	Keiichi Naganuma	Umetsugu Inoue		
1956	Hadashi no Seishun	Yūji Wada	Senkichi Taniguchi		
1956	Sazae-san	Norisuke Namino	Nobuo Aoyagi		
1956	Oshidori no Ma	Andō	Keigo Kimura		
1957	Black River	Joe	Masaki Kobayashi		
1957	Oban	Shin-don	Yasuki Chiba		
1957	Untamed	Kimura	Mikio Naruse		
1957	Hikage no Musume	Motohashi	Shūe Matsubayashi		
1957	Zoku Oban: Fuun hen	Shin-don	Yasuki Chiba		
1957	A Dangerous Hero (Kiken na eiyu)	Imamura	Hideo Suzuki		
1957	Zokuzoku Oban: Dotou hen	Shin-don	Yasuki Chiba		
1957	Sazae's Youth (Sazae-san no seishun)	Norisuke Namino	Nobuo Aoyagi		
1958	A Boy and Three Mothers	Kensaku	Seiji Hisamatsu		
1958	All About Marriage (Kekkon no subete)	Akira Nakayama	Kihachi Okamoto		
1958	Go and Get It (Buttsuke honban)	Hara	Kozo Saeki		
1958	Conflagration (Enjō)	Togari	Kon Ichikawa		
1958	Naked Sun	Jirō Maeda	Miyoji Ieki		
1959	The Human Condition: No Greater Love	Kaji	Masaki Kobayashi	Lead role	
1959	Odd Obsession	Kimura	Kon Ichikawa		
1959	The Human Condition: Road to Eternity	Kaji	Masaki Kobayashi	Lead role	
1959	Yaju shisubeshi	Kunihiko Date	Eizo Sugawa	Lead role	
1959	Three Dolls in Ginza (Ginza no onéchan)	Kyōsuke Tamura	Toshio Sugie		
1959	An'ya Kōro	Kaname	Shirō Toyoda		
1960	When a Woman Ascends the Stairs (Onna ga Kaidan wo Noboru Toki)	Kenichi Komatsu	Mikio Naruse		
1960	Daughters, Wives, and a Mother (Musume tsuma haha)	Shingo Kuroki	Mikio Naruse		
1960	The Blue Beast (Aoi yaju)	Yasuhiko Kuroki	Hiromichi Horikawa		
1960	Get 'em All ("Minagoroshi no uta" yori kenju-yo saraba!)	Tsubota	Eizō Sugawa		
1961	As a Wife, As a Woman (Tsuma to shite onna to shite)	Minami	Mikio Naruse		
1961	Yōjimbō	Unosuke	Akira Kurosawa		
1961	The Human Condition: A Soldier's Prayer	Kaji	Masaki Kobayashi	Lead role	
1961	Kumo ga chigieru toki	James Kimura	Heinosuke Gosho		
1961	Immortal Love	Heibei	Keisuke Kinoshita		
1962	Sanjuro	Muroto Hanbei	Akira Kurosawa		
1962	Love Under the Crucifix (Oginsama)	Takayama Ukon	Kinuyo Tanaka	Lead role	
1962	The Inheritance (Karami-ai)	Kikuo Furukawa	Masaki Kobayashi		
1962	Harakiri	Tsugumo Hanshirō	Masaki Kobayashi	Lead role	
1962	Madame Aki	Uojirō Tatsumi	Shirō Toyoda		
1963	High and Low	Chief Detective Tokura	Akira Kurosawa		
1963	Pressure of Guilt (Shiro to kuro)	Ichirō Hamano	Hiromichi Horikawa	Lead role	
1963	Legacy of the 500,000	Mitsuru Gunji	Toshiro Mifune		
1963	Miren	Ryōta Kinoshita	Yasuki Chiba		
1963	A Woman's Life (Onna no rekishi)	Takashi Akimoto	Mikio Naruse		
1964	Arijigoku sakusen	Ishiki	Takashi Tsuboshima	Lead role	
1964	Kwaidan	Minokichi	Masaki Kobayashi	Lead role	
1965	Saigo no shinpan	Jirō	Hiromichi Horikawa	Lead role	
1965	Fort Graveyard (Chi to suna)	Sakuma	Kihachi Okamoto		
1965	Illusion of Blood	Iemon	Shirō Toyoda	Lead role	
1966	Cash Calls Hell (Gohiki no shinshi)	Oida	Hideo Gosha	Lead role	
1966	The Sword of Doom	Ryunosuke Tsukue	Kihachi Okamoto	Lead role	
1966	The Face of Another	Mr. Okuyama	Hiroshi Teshigahara	Lead role	
1966	The Daphne (Jinchoge)	Professor Kanahira	Yasuki Chiba		
1967	The Age of Assassins (Satsujin kyo jidai)	Shinji Kikyo	Kihachi Okamoto	Lead role	
1967	Kojiro	Miyamoto Musashi	Hiroshi Inagaki		
1967	Samurai Rebellion	Asano Tatewaki	Masaki Kobayashi		
1967	Japan's Longest Day	Narrator	Kihachi Okamoto		
1968	Today We Kill, Tomorrow We Die!	James Elfego	Tonino Cervi		
1968	Kill!	Genta	Kihachi Okamoto	Lead role	
1968	Admiral Yamamoto	Narrator	Seiji Maruyama		
1968	The Human Bullet	Narrator	Kihachi Okamoto		
1969	Goyokin	Magobei	Hideo Gosha	Lead role	
1969	Eiko's 5000 Kilograms (Eiko e no 5,000 kiro)	Takeuchi	Koreyoshi Kurahara		
1969	Battle of the Japan Sea	Akashi Motojiro	Seiji Maruyama		
1969	Hitokiri	Takechi Hanpeita	Hideo Gosha		
1969	Blood End (Tengu-to)	Sentarō	Satsuo Yamamoto	Lead role	
1969	Portrait of Hell	Yoshihide	Shirō Toyoda	Lead role	
1970	Duel at Ezo (Ezo yakata no ketto)	Daizennokami Honjo	Kengo Furusawa		
1970	Bakumatsu	Nakaoka Shintarō	Daisuke Itō		
1970	The Scandalous Adventures of Buraikan	Kataoka Naojirō	Masahiro Shinoda		
1970	Zatoichi Goes to the Fire Festival	Ronin	Kenji Misumi		
1970	Will to Conquer (Tenka no abarembo)	Yoshida Tōyō	Seiji Maruyama		
1971	Inn of Evil (Inochi boni furo)	Sadashichi	Masaki Kobayashi	Lead role	
1971	Battle of Okinawa	Colonel Hiromichi Yahara	Kihachi Okamoto	Lead role	
1971	The Wolves (Shussho Iwai)	Seji Iwahashi	Hideo Gosha	Lead role	
1973	Osho	Sekine	Hiromichi Horikawa		
1973	The Human Revolution	Nichiren	Toshio Masuda		
1973	Rise, Fair Sun	Sakuzo	Kei Kumai	Lead role	
1974	Karei-naru Ichizoku	Teppei Manpyō	Satsuo Yamamoto	Lead role	
1975	The Gate of Youth (Seishun no mon)	Jūzō Ibuki	Kirio Urayama		
1975	Tokkan	Hijikata Toshizō	Kihachi Okamoto		
1975	I Am a Cat (Wagahai wa neko de aru)	Kushami Chin'no	Kon Ichikawa	Lead role	
1975	Kinkanshoku	Yasuo Hoshino	Satsuo Yamamoto	Lead role	
1976	Banka	Setsuo Katsuragi	Yoshisuke Kawasaki		
1976	Zoku ningen kakumei	Nichiren	Toshio Masuda		
1976	Fumō Chitai	Tadashi Iki	Satsuo Yamamoto	Lead role	
1977	Sugata Sanshiro	Shōgorō Yano	Kihachi Okamoto		
1978	Blue Christmas	Minami	Kihachi Okamoto		
1978	Queen Bee (Jo-oh-bachi)	Ginzo Daidoji	Kon Ichikawa		
1978	Bandits vs. Samurai Squadron	Kumokiri Nizaemon	Hideo Gosha	Lead role	
1978	Hi no Tori (Hi no tori)	Ninigi	Kon Ichikawa		
1979	Hunter in the Dark (Yami no karyudo)	Gomyo Kiyoemon	Hideo Gosha	Lead role	
1980	Kagemusha	Takeda Shingen / Kagemusha	Akira Kurosawa	Lead role	
1980	The Battle of Port Arthur (also known as 203 kochi)	General Nogi Maresuke	Toshio Masuda	Lead role	
1981	Willful Murder	Yashiro	Kei Kumai	Lead role	
1982	Onimasa	Masagoro Kiryuin	Hideo Gosha	Lead role	
1984	Fireflies in the North	Takeshi Tsukigata	Hideo Gosha	Lead role	
1985	Ran	Lord Hidetora Ichimonji	Akira Kurosawa	Lead role	
1985	The Empty Table (Shokutaku no nai ie)	Nobuyuki Kidoji	Masaki Kobayashi	Lead role	
1986	Atami satsujin jiken	Denbei Nikaido	Kazuo Takahashi	Lead role	
1986	Michi	Seiji Tajima	Koreyoshi Kurahara	Lead role	
1987	Hachiko Monogatari	Hidejiro Ueno	Seijirō Kōyama	Lead role	
1988	Return from the River Kwai	Major Harada	Andrew V. McLaglen		
1988	Oracion (Yushun)	Heihachiro Wagu	Shigemichi Sugita		
1989	Four Days of Snow and Blood (Ni-ni-roku)	Hajime Sugiyama	Hideo Gosha		
1991	Heat Wave (Kagero)	Tsunejiro Murai	Hideo Gosha		
1991	Florence My Love	Sakazaki	Seiji Izumi		
1992	The Wicked City	Daishu (Yuen Tai Chung)	Mak Tai-Kit		
1992	Basara – The Princess Goh (Goh-hime)	Furuta Oribe	Hiroshi Teshigahara		
1992	Tōki Rakujitsu	Sakae Kobayashi	Seijirō Kōyama		
1993	Lone Wolf and Cub: Final Conflict	Yagyu Retsudo	Akira Inoue		
1993	Summer of the Moonlight Sonata (Gekko no natsu)	Kazama (postwar)	Seijirō Kōyama		
1995	East Meets West	Katsu Rintarō	Kihachi Okamoto		
1996	Miyazawa Kenji sono ai	Seijirō Miyazawa	Seijirō Kōyama		
1999	After the Rain	Tsuji Gettan	Takashi Koizumi		
1999	Spellbound	Hideaki Sasaki	Masato Harada		
2001	Vengeance for Sale (Sukedachi-ya Sukeroku)	Umetaro Katakura	Kihachi Okamoto		
2002	To Dance With the White Dog (Shiroi inu to Waltz wo)	Eisuke Nakamoto	Takashi Tsukinoki	Lead role	
2002	Dawn of a New Day: The Man Behind VHS	Konosuke Matsushita	Kiyoshi Sasabe		
2003	Like Asura	Kotaro Takezawa	Yoshimitsu Morita		
2005	Yamato	Katsumi Kamio (75 years old)	Junya Sato		
2006	The Inugamis	Sahei Inugami	Kon Ichikawa		
2009	Listen to My Heart	Kyozo Hayami	Shinichi Mishiro		
2010	Haru's Journey	Tadao Nakai	Masahiro Kobayashi	Lead role	
2010	Zatoichi: The Last	Tendo	Junji Sakamoto		
2012	Until The Break Of Dawn	Sadayuki Akiyama	Yūichirō Hirakawa		
2013	Human Trust	Nobuhiko Sasakura	Junji Sakamoto		
2015	Yuzuriha no koro	Kenichiro Miya	Mineko Okamoto		
2015	A Duel Tale (Hatashiai)	Shoji Sanosuke	Shigemichi Sugita	Lead role	
2017	Lear on the Shore	Chōkitsu Kuwabatake	Masahiro Kobayashi	Lead role	
2018	The Negotiator: Behind The Reversion of Okinawa	Narrator	Tsuyoshi Yanagawa		
2019	Kikyo – The Return	Unokichi	Shigemichi Sugita	Lead role	
2020	The Pass: Last Days of the Samurai	Makino Tadayuki	Takashi Koizumi		

=== Animated film ===
Year	Title	Role	Director	Notes	Ref.
1973	Kanashimi no Belladonna	The Devil	Eiichi Yamamoto		
1983	Final Yamato	Narrator	Tomoharu Katsumata / Yoshinobu Nishizaki / Takeshi Shirado / Toshio Masuda		
2013	The Tale of the Princess Kaguya	Sumiyaki no Roujini	Isao Takahata		
2014	Giovanni's Island	Junpei Senō (Old)	Mizuho Nishikubo		

=== Theater ===
Year	Title	Role	Director	Notes	Ref.
1964	Hamlet	Hamlet	Koreya Senda		
1968	Yotsuya Kaidan	Tamiya Iemon	Eitaro Ozawa		
1971	Othello	Othello	Koreya Senda		
1974	Richard III	Richard	Toshikiyo Masumi		
1975	The Lower Depths	Satine	Toshikiyo Masumi		
1978	Oedipus Rex	Oedipus	Tomoe Ryu (Yasuko Miyazaki)		
1982	Macbeth	Macbeth	Tomoe Ryu (Yasuko Miyazaki)		
1990	Cyrano de Bergerac	Cyrano de Bergerac	Tomoe Ryu (Yasuko Miyazaki)		
2000	Death of a Salesman	William "Willy" Loman	Kiyoto Hayashi		
2001	The Merry Wives of Windsor	John Falstaff	Kiyoto Hayashi		
2005	Driving Miss Daisy	Hoke	Ikumi Tanno		
2008	Don Quixote	Miguel de Cervantes	Ikumi Tanno		
2010	John Gabriel Borkman	John Gabriel Borkman	Tamiya Kuriyama		
2013	Bluebeard's Castle	The Bard	Michiyoshi Inoue		
2014	Barrymore	John Barrymore	Ikumi Tanno		
2014	Romeo and Juliet	Father Lawrence	Ikumi Tanno		

=== Television ===
Year	Title	Role	Notes	Ref.
1971	Shin Heike Monogatari	Taira no Kiyomori	Lead role, Taiga drama	
1977	Castle of Sand	Eitaro Imanishi	Lead role	
1990	13 Assassins (Jusan-nin no Shikaku)	Shimada Shinzaemon	Lead role	
1995	Daichi no Ko	Kōji Matsumoto	Lead role	
1996	Hideyoshi	Sen no Rikyū	Taiga drama	
2004	Socrates in Love	Kentarō Matsumoto	Special appearance	
2007	Fūrin Kazan	Takeda Nobutora	Taiga drama	
2014	Zainin no Uso	Kenzō Haneda		
2015	Haretsu	Kuraki		
2015	Hatashiai	Sanosuke	Lead role, TV movie	
2016	Kyoaku wa Nemurasenai	Yōhei Tachibana		
2016	Cold Case			
2017	Henkan Kōshōnin	Narrator	TV movie	

== Honours ==
- Chevalier De L’Ordre des Arts et des Lettres (1992)
- Medal with Purple Ribbon (1996)
- Order of the Rising Sun, 4th Class, Gold Rays with Rosette (2003)
- Person of Cultural Merit (2007)
- Asahi Prize (2013)
- Kawakita Award (2013)
- Toshiro Mifune Award (2015)
- Order of Culture (2015)
- Honorary citizen of Tokyo (2024)
- Junior Third Rank (2025, posthumous award)
