= Harakiri (1962 film) =

Japanese jidaigeki film

- Theatrical release poster
- Directed by: Masaki Kobayashi
- Screenplay by: Shinobu Hashimoto
- Based on: "Ibunronin ki" by Yasuhiko Takiguchi
- Produced by: Tatsuo Hosoya
- Starring: Tatsuya Nakadai; Rentarō Mikuni; Akira Ishihama; Shima Iwashita; Tetsurō Tamba
- Cinematography: Yoshio Miyajima
- Edited by: Hisashi Sagara
- Music by: Tōru Takemitsu
- Production company: Shochiku
- Distributed by: Shochiku
- Release date: 16 September 1962 (Japan)
- Running time: 133 minutes
- Country: Japan
- Language: Japanese

Harakiri (Japanese: 切腹, Hepburn: Seppuku) is a 1962 Japanese jidaigeki film directed by Masaki Kobayashi. The story takes place between 1619 and 1630 during the Edo period and the rule of the Tokugawa shogunate. It tells the story of the rōnin Hanshirō Tsugumo, who requests to commit seppuku (harakiri) within the manor of a local feudal lord, using the opportunity to explain the events that drove him to ask for death before an audience of samurai. The film continues to receive critical acclaim, often considered one of the greatest films of all time.

== Plot ==
The film takes place in Edo in the year 1630. A rōnin called Tsugumo Hanshirō arrives at the estate of the Iyi clan and says that he wishes to commit seppuku within the courtyard of the palace. To deter him, Saitō Kageyu, the daimyō's senior counselor, tells Hanshirō the story of another rōnin, Chijiiwa Motome — formerly of the same clan as Hanshirō.

Saitō scornfully recalls the practice of rōnin requesting the chance to commit seppuku on the clan's land, but in fact hoping to be turned away and given alms. Motome had arrived at the palace a few months earlier and made the same request as Hanshirō. Infuriated by the rising number of "suicide bluffs", the three most senior samurai of the clan—Yazaki Hayato, Kawabe Umenosuke, and Omodaka Hikokuro—persuaded Saitō to force Motome to follow through and kill himself, ignoring his request for a couple of days delay. Upon examining Motome's swords, his blades were found to be made of bamboo. Enraged that any samurai would "pawn his soul", the House of Iyi forced Motome to disembowel himself with his own bamboo blade, making his death slow, agonizingly painful, and deeply humiliating.

Despite this warning, Hanshirō insists that he has never heard of Motome and says that he is sincere in wanting to commit seppuku. Just as the ceremony is about to begin, Hanshirō is asked to name the samurai who shall behead him when the ritual is complete. To the shock of Saitō and the Iyi retainers, Hanshirō successively names Hayato, Umenosuke, and Hikokuro — the three samurai who coerced the suicide of Motome. When messengers are dispatched to summon them, all three decline to come, with each claiming to be too ill to attend.

While waiting for the messengers to return, Hanshirō recounts his life story to the assembled samurai, starting with the admission that he did know Motome. In 1619, his clan was abolished by the Shōgun. His lord decided to commit seppuku and, as his most senior samurai, Hanshirō planned to die alongside him. To prevent this, Hanshirō's closest friend took his place instead, leaving Hanshirō responsible for his teenage son, Motome. In order to support Motome and his own daughter Miho, Hanshirō rented a hovel in the slums of Edo, taking up work as a fan and umbrella craftsman while Motome became a teacher. Realizing the love between Motome and Miho, Hanshirō arranged for them to marry. Soon after, they had a son, Kingo.

When Miho became ill with tuberculosis, Motome could not bear the thought of losing her and did everything to raise money to hire a doctor. When Kingo also fell ill, Motome left one morning, saying he planned to take out a loan from a moneylender. Later that evening, Hayato, Umenosuke, and Hikokuro brought home Motome's mutilated body, and described and mocked his death before leaving. It is now clear that Motome had requested a delay so he could visit his family and put his affairs in order. A few days later, Kingo died, and Miho lost the will to live and died, leaving Hanshirō with nothing. Finishing his story, Hanshirō explains that his sole desire is to join Motome, Miho, and Kingo in death. He explains, however, that they have every right to ask him whether justice has been exacted for their deaths. Therefore, Hanshirō asks Saitō if he has any statement of regret to convey to Motome, Miho, and Kingo. He explains that, if Saitō does so, he will die without saying another word. Saitō refuses, calling Motome an "extortionist" who deserved to die.

After provoking Saitō's laughter by calling the samurai moral code bushido a facade, Hanshirō reveals the last part of his story. Before coming to the Iyi estate, he tracked down Hayato and Umenosuke and cut off their topknots. Hikokuro then visited Hanshirō's hovel and, with great respect, challenged him to a duel. After a brief but tense sword fight, Hikokuro suffers a double disgrace: his sword is broken and his topknot is taken as well. As proof, Hanshirō removes their labelled topknots from his kimono and casts them upon the palace courtyard. He mocks the Iyi clan, saying that if the men he humiliated were true samurai, they would not be hiding out of shame. He also questions the clan's honor and bushido itself, pointing out that they should not have ignored Motome's request for a delay to his seppuku without investigating the reason why he asked, but they were too preoccupied with their supposed honor to care.

Having badly lost face, an enraged Saitō calls Hanshirō a madman and orders the retainers to kill him. In a fierce battle, Hanshirō kills four samurai, wounds eight, and contemptuously smashes into pieces the antique suit of armor which symbolizes the glorious history of the House of Iyi. Finally, the clan corners Hanshirō and prepares to kill him not with swords, but with three matchlock guns. As Hanshirō commits seppuku, he is simultaneously shot by all three gunmen.

Terrified that the Iyi clan will be abolished if word gets out that "a half starved rōnin" killed so many of their retainers, Saitō announces that all deaths caused by Hanshirō shall be explained by "illness". At the same time, a messenger returns reporting that Hikokuro had killed himself the day before, while Hayato and Umenosuke are both faking illness. Saitō angrily orders that Hayato and Umenosuke be forced to commit seppuku as atonement for losing their topknots. Those three deaths are also to be attributed to "illness".

As the suit of armor is cleaned and re-erected, a new entry in the official records of the House of Iyi is read by a voiceover. Hanshirō is declared to have been mentally unstable, and he and Motome are both listed as having died through harakiri. The Shōgun is said to have issued a personal commendation to the lord of the Iyi clan for how his councilors handled the suicide bluffs of Motome and Hanshirō. At the end of his letter, the Shōgun praises the House of Iyi and their samurai as exemplars of bushido. As workers scrub the blood from the ground of the clan's estate, one of them finds a severed topknot and places it in his work bucket.

== Cast ==
- Tatsuya Nakadai – Tsugumo Hanshirō (津雲 半四郎)
- Rentarō Mikuni – Saitō Kageyu (斎藤 勘解由)
- Akira Ishihama – Chijiiwa Motome (千々岩 求女)
- Shima Iwashita – Tsugumo Miho (津雲 美保)
- Tetsurō Tamba – Omodaka Hikokuro (沢潟 彦九郎)
- Ichirō Nakatani – Yazaki Hayato (矢崎 隼人)
- Masao Mishima – Inaba Tango (稲葉 丹後)
- Kei Satō – Fukushima Masakatsu (福島 正勝)
- Yoshio Inaba – Chijiiwa Jinai (千々岩 陣内)
- Yoshiro Aoki – Kawabe Umenosuke (川辺 右馬介)

== Themes ==
When asked about the theme of his film, Kobayashi said: "All of my pictures ... are concerned with resisting an entrenched power. That's what Harakiri is about, of course, and Rebellion as well. I suppose I've always challenged authority".

Audie Bock describes the theme of Harakiri as "the inhumanity of this requirement for those who dutifully adhered to it, and the hypocrisy of those who enforced this practice". The movie doesn't so much challenge the practice of seppuku; rather, it highlights an instance when it occurred in a punitive and hypocritical environment. The notions of honor and bravery associated with it can be a false front, as the protagonist puts it, serving more as a means of preserving reputations than of actually atoning for a crime or misdeed.

The empty suit of armor, shown in the beginning, symbolizes the past glory of the Iyi clan, and is treated by them with reverence. However, the samurai of the Iyi house behave like cowards in the fight with Hanshirō, who mockingly tries to use the armor as a shield before smashing it on the ground. Kobayashi makes a point here that this symbol of military prowess turns out to be an empty one.

Kobayashi also attacks two other important attributes of the samurai rank: the sword and the topknot. Motome finds out that his swords are of no use to him if he cannot provide for his family and so he sells them to pay for his son's medical care. When Hanshirō takes his revenge on the three men complicit in Motome's death, he prefers divesting them of their topknots rather than killing them. At the time, losing one's topknot was the same as losing one's sword, and death would be preferable to such dishonor. However, only one of the three samurai, Omodaka, actually commits seppuku, with the other two being forced by the clan to take their own lives at swordpoint. Thus, the way Hanshirō takes revenge is subtle: he makes the clan live by the rules they claim to uphold and which they used to punish Motome.

The daily record book of the clan that appears in the beginning and the end of the film "represents the recorded lies of history". Hanshirō's death is falsely labeled as suicide, the three samurai and the men he killed are said to have died of natural causes rather than violence, and the entire story of his challenge to the clan is swept under the rug to protect the façade of "the unjust power structure" that the Iyi clan represents.

== Release ==
Harakiri was released in Japan in 1962. The film was released by Shochiku Film of America with English subtitles in the United States in December 1963.

== Reception ==
In a contemporary review, the Monthly Film Bulletin stated that Masaki Kobayashi's "slow, measured cadence perfectly matches his subject" and that the "story itself is beautifully constructed". The review praised Tatsuya Nakadai's "brilliant, Mifune-like performance" and noted that the film was "on occasion brutal, particularly in the young samurai's terrible agony with his bamboo sword" and that although "some critics have remarked [...] that being gory is not the best way to deplore wanton bloodshed, Harakiri still looks splendid with its measured tracking shots, its slow zooms, its reflective overhead shots of the courtyard, and its frequent poised immobility". The New York Times reviewer Bosley Crowther was unimpressed with "the tortured human drama in this film" but added that "Mr. Kobayashi does superb things with architectural compositions, moving forms and occasionally turbulent gyrations of struggling figures in the CinemaScope-size screen. He achieves a sort of visual mesmerization that is suitable to the curious nightmare mood". Cid Corman wrote in Film Quarterly that "the beauty of the film seems largely due to Kobayashi's underlying firmness of conception and prevailing spirit, by an unevasive concern for cinematic values".

Donald Richie called it the director's "single finest picture" and quoted Kobayashi's mentor Keisuke Kinoshita who named it among the top five greatest Japanese films of all time. Audie Bock wrote: "Harakiri avoids the sentimentality of some of his earlier films, such as The Human Condition, through a new emphasis on visual-auditory aesthetics with the cold formality of compositions and Takemitsu's electronic score. But none of Kobayashi's social protests is diminished in the film's construction – it's Mizoguchi-like circularity that bitterly denies any hope for human progress". Roger Ebert included Harakiri in his list of "Great Movies", writing in his 2012 review: "Samurai films, like westerns, need not be familiar genre stories. They can expand to contain stories of ethical challenges and human tragedy. Harakiri, one of the best of them, is about an older wandering samurai who takes his time to create an unanswerable dilemma for the elder of a powerful clan. By playing strictly within the rules of Bushido Code which governs the conduct of all samurai, he lures the powerful leader into a situation where sheer naked logic leaves him humiliated before his retainers".

On Rotten Tomatoes, the film has a 100% rating based on 11 critic reviews, with an average rating of 8.40/10.

== Awards ==
The film was entered in the competition category at the 1963 Cannes Film Festival. It lost the Palme d'Or to The Leopard, but received the Special Jury Award.

== Remake ==
The film was remade by Japanese director Takashi Miike as a 3D film titled Hara-Kiri: Death of a Samurai. It premiered at the 2011 Cannes Film Festival.
