= Battle of Okinawa (film) =

- Film poster
- Directed by: Kihachi Okamoto
- Screenplay by: Kaneto Shindo; Ryōzō Kasahara
- Produced by: Sanezumi Fujimoto; Hiroshi Haryu
- Starring: Keiju Kobayashi; Tetsurō Tamba; Tatsuya Nakadai; Wakako Sakai; Mayumi Ōzora; Yūzō Kayama; Ryō Ikebe
- Narrated by: Kiyoshi Kobayashi
- Cinematography: Hiroshi Murai
- Edited by: Yoshitami Kuroiwa
- Music by: Masaru Sato
- Production company: Toho
- Release date: 17 July 1971 (Japan)
- Running time: 149 minutes
- Country: Japan

Battle of Okinawa (Japanese: 激動の昭和史 沖縄決戦, Hepburn: Gekidō no Shōwashi: Okinawa Kessen) is a 1971 Japanese war film directed by Kihachi Okamoto from a screenplay by Kaneto Shindo and Ryōzō Kasahara, with effects by Teruyoshi Nakano.

== Release ==
Battle of Okinawa received a roadshow theatrical release released on 17 July 1971 in Japan. It received a general release in Japan on 14 August 1971. The film was Toho's highest-grossing film of the year, and the fourth highest grossing domestic release of the year in Japan.

The film was released theatrically in the United States by Min-On of America with a 149-minute running time on 11 September 1973.

== Cast ==
- Keijyu Kobayashi as Mitsuru Ushijima
- Tetsuro Tamba as Isamu Chō
- Tatsuya Nakadai as Hiromichi Yahara
- Yūsuke Kawazu as Jin
- Jūkei Fujioka as Sanada
- Ichirō Nakatani as Ueno
- Akira Yamanouchi as Shūichi Miyazaki
- Wakako Sakai as Tokashiki
- Jun Hamamura as Shuki Izumi
- Shigeru Kōyama as Akira Shimada
- Sachio Sakai
- Ryosuke Kagawa
- Kamatari Fujiwara
- Yūsuke Takita as Seizen Nakasone
- Minori Terada as Mitsuru Yoshida
- Hisashi Igawa as Itō
- Kunie Tanaka as Higa
- Gorō Mutsumi as Yakumaru
- Katsuhiko Sasaki as Miyake
- Mizuho Suzuki as Nakajima
- Shin Kishida as Meguro
- Etsushi Takahashi as Yokichi Kaya
- Takeo Chii as Ogura
- Eijirō Tōno as Yoshijirō Umezu
- Yūzō Kayama as Dr. Higa
- Kōji Mitsui as Old Man
- Ryō Ikebe as Minoru Ōta

== See also ==
- List of Japanese films of 1971

== Sources ==
- Galbraith IV, Stuart (2008). The Toho Studios Story: A History and Complete Filmography. Scarecrow Press. ISBN 978-1461673743.
