= Sakon torimonochō: senketsu no tegata =

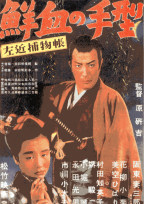
- Japanese movie poster
- Directed by: Kenkichi Hara
- Produced by: Shochiku
- Edited by: Hisashi Sagara
- Release date: 2 December 1950
- Running time: 91 minutes
- Country: Japan
- Language: Japanese

Sakon torimonochō: senketsu no tegata (左近捕物帖 鮮血の手型; literally "Sakon Detective Story: The Fresh Blood Handprint) is a 1950 black-and-white Japanese film directed by Hara Kenkichi.

== Cast ==
- Kodayū Ichikawa (市川小太夫)
- Hibari Misora
- and others
