= Dora-heita =

2000 film by Kon Ichikawa

- Theatrical poster
- Directed by: Kon Ichikawa
- Screenplay by: Kon Ichikawa; Akira Kurosawa; Keisuke Kinoshita; Masaki Kobayashi
- Based on: Dora-heita by Shūgorō Yamamoto
- Starring: Kōji Yakusho; Yūko Asano; Bunta Sugawara; Ryudo Uzaki; Tsurutaro Kataoka
- Cinematography: Yukio Isohata
- Production company: Nikkatsu
- Distributed by: Toho
- Release date: 10 May 2000 (Japan)
- Running time: 110 minutes
- Country: Japan
- Language: Japanese

Dora-heita (Japanese: どら平太; English: Alley Cat) is a 2000 Japanese film by director Kon Ichikawa. It was the 74th film made by Ichikawa.

== Plot ==
A new magistrate (played by Kōji Yakusho) in the town of Horisoto—widely reputed to be the most lawless township in Japan, uses guile and his opponents' own misperceptions and prejudices to defeat his enemies and uproot corruption.

== Cast ==
- Kōji Yakusho
- Yūko Asano
- Bunta Sugawara
- Ryudo Uzaki
- Tsurutaro Kataoka
- Hirotarō Honda as Denkichi

== Production ==
The film was planned and written by the Yonki-no-kai, a group of four of Japan's most notable directors: Kon Ichikawa, Masaki Kobayashi, Keisuke Kinoshita, and Akira Kurosawa in 1969. The commercial failure of Dodes'ka-den meant that funds were not available for filming Dora-heita.

Many years later, after the deaths of the other three partners, Ichikawa was able to produce the film. The film includes cinematography by Yukio Isohata and a musical score by Kensaku Tanikawa.

The film was screened at the Berlin International Film Festival in 2000 and the Japanese Film Festival.

== Reception ==
Variety gave a mixed review and said the film lacks energy and muscularity of samurai classics of the 1950s and 60s but noted the solid production, efficient camerawork, and striking musical score. The Times Online called it "a witty, mellow period film".
