= Mayumi Ogawa =

Japanese actress (1939–2026)

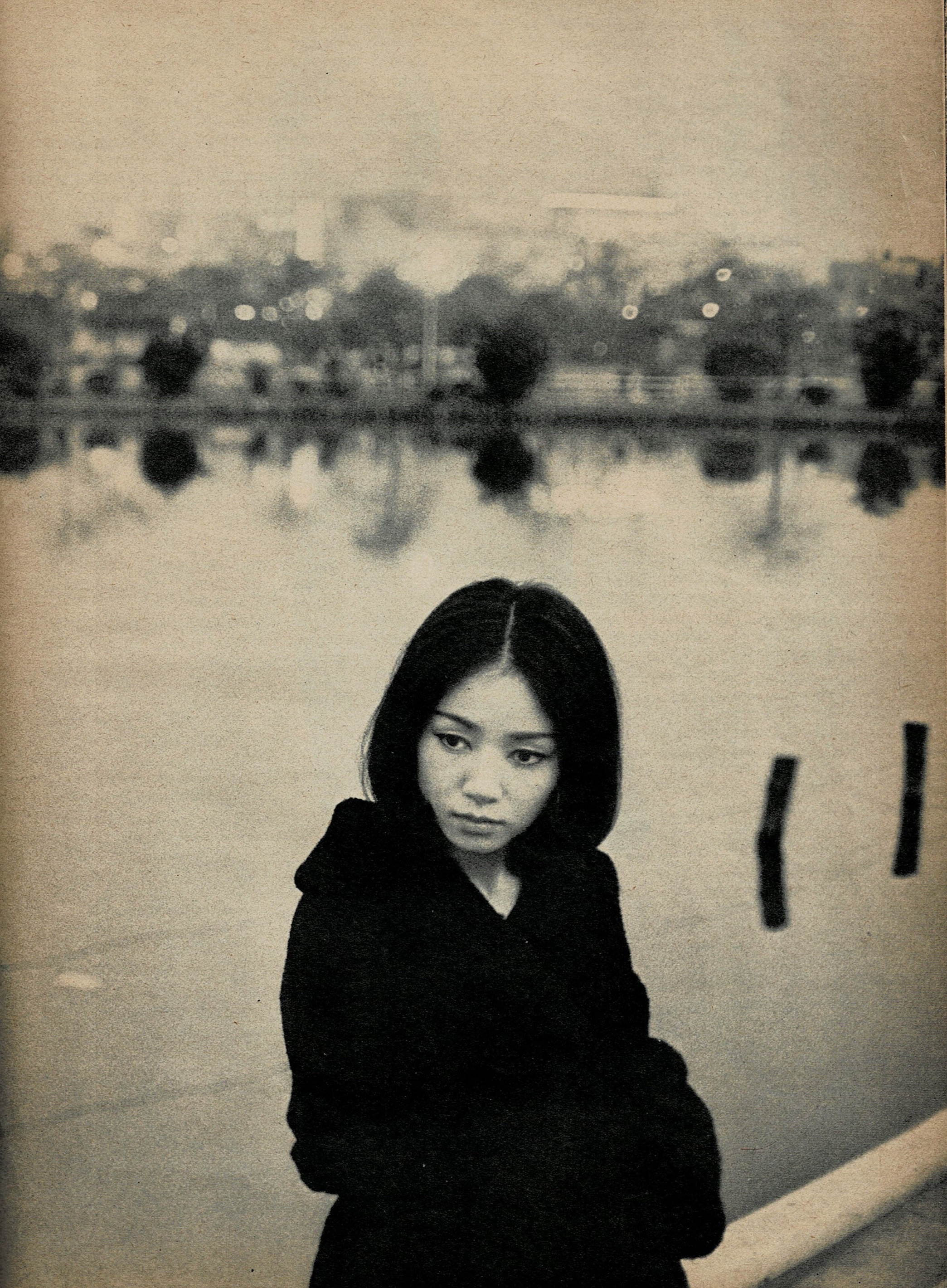
- Born: December 11, 1939; Adachi, Tokyo, Japan
- Died: March 26, 2026 (aged 86)
- Occupation: Actress
- Years active: 1961–2026
- Spouse: Toshiyuki Hosokawa (1967–1973)

Mayumi Ogawa (小川眞由美; December 11, 1939 – March 26, 2026) was a Japanese actress. She won the award for best supporting actress at the 3rd Japan Academy Prize and at the 4th Hochi Film Award for Vengeance Is Mine and The Three Undelivered Letters.

In 2008, Ogawa got ordained as a Shingon Buddhist nun. In an interview with J-Cast News, she mentioned that during her tonsure ceremony, only one strand of hair was pulled out. Ogawa remained involved in the entertainment industry in later life.

Ogawa died from coronary artery disease on March 26, 2026, at the age of 86. Her death was not announced publicly until August 9.

== Filmography ==
=== Film ===
- Mother (1963)
- Night Ladies (1964)
- Night Scandal (1964)
- Convicted Woman (1966)
- Nakano Spy School (1966)
- Shiroi Kyotō (1966)
- Zatoichi's Vengeance (1966)
- Flame and Women (1967)
- If You Were Young: Rage (1970)
- 300 Million Thief: Statute of Limitations (1975)
- The Fossil (1975)
- The Demon (1978)
- Vengeance Is Mine (1979)
- Glowing Autumn (1979)
- The Three Undelivered Letters (1979)
- Shikake-nin Baian (1981)
- The Go Masters (1983)
- Farewell to the Ark (1984)
- The Empty Table (1985)
- The Political Game (1989)
- Woman of Water (2002)

=== Television ===
- Minamoto no Yoshitsune (1966) – Shiobu
- Three Outlaw Samurai (1966) – Oshima
- Karei-naru Ichizoku (1974–75) – Aiko Takasu / Narrator
- Akō Rōshi (1979) – Yūgiri Tayū
- Takeda Shingen (1988) – Yae
- Aoi Tokugawa Sandai (2000) – Yodo-dono

=== Dubbing roles ===
- Cleopatra (1975 NTV edition) – Cleopatra (Elizabeth Taylor)
