= Yōko Asaji =

Japanese actress

Yōko Asaji 浅茅 陽子
- Born: April 2, 1951 (age 75); Shizuoka, Japan
- Occupations: Actress, singer
- Years active: 1974–present

Yōko Asaji (浅茅 陽子, Asaji Yōko) (born April 2, 1951) is a Japanese actress from Shimizu (now part of the city of Shizuoka), Shizuoka Prefecture, Japan.

Yōko starred in the NHK morning drama Kumo no Jūtan, achieving widespread popularity. Since then she has appeared in various television, film, and stage productions. In addition to contemporary roles, Yōko has taken parts in jidaigeki. She portrayed Yaya in the 1987 NHK Taiga drama Onna Taikōki, and from 1988 to 1994 she played Osai, the wife of the fire captain, in Abarenbo Shogun (the second of three actresses for that character). Yōko voiced Maddie Hayes, the Cybill Shepherd role, in the dubbed version of Moonlighting.

== Filmography ==
=== Television ===
- Kumo no Jūtan (1976), Makoto
- Onna Taikōki (1981), Yaya
- Oshin (1983–84), Michiko Takura
- Ohisama (2011), Saki Sakurai
- Tengu no Daidokoro (2023–), Shikiko Izuna

=== Film ===
- Willful Murder (1981), Kawada
- The Voice of Sin (2020), Mitsuko Ōshima
- Hold Your Hand (2023)

== Awards ==
Year	Award	Category	Work(s)	Result	Ref.
1977	1st Elan d'or Awards	Newcomer of the Year	Herself	Won	

== External references ==
- Yôko Asaji at IMDB
