= Apple Children of Aeon =

Japanese manga series

- First tankōbon volume cover

千年万年りんごの子 (Sennen Mannen Ringo no Ko)
- Genre: Supernatural
- Manga
- Written by: Ai Tanaka
- Published by: Kodansha
- English publisher: NA: Kodansha USA (digital)
- Magazine: Itan
- Original run: December 22, 2011 – February 7, 2014
- Volumes: 3
- icon

Apple Children of Aeon (Japanese: 千年万年りんごの子, Hepburn: Sennen Mannen Ringo no Ko) is a Japanese manga series written and illustrated by Ai Tanaka. It was serialized in Kodansha's Kodansha's josei manga magazine Itan from December 2011 to February 2014, with its chapters collected in three tankōbon volumes.

== Publication ==
Written and illustrated by Ai Tanaka, Apple Children of Aeon was serialized in Kodansha's josei manga magazine Itan from December 22, 2011, to December 7, 2013; an extra chapter was published in the magazine on February 7, 2014. Kodansha collected its chapters in three tankōbon volumes, released from July 6, 2012, to March 7, 2014.

The manga has been licensed for English digital release in North America by Kodansha USA. The three volumes were released from March 8 to May 10, 2022.

=== Volumes ===
No.	Original release date	Original ISBN	English release date	English ISBN
1	July 6, 2012	978-4-06-380578-9	March 8, 2022	978-1-63699-622-6
2	May 7, 2013	978-4-06-380625-0	April 12, 2022	978-1-63699-666-0
3	March 7, 2014	978-4-06-380678-6	May 10, 2022	978-1-68491-146-2

== Reception ==
The series ranked seventh on Takarajimasha's Kono Manga ga Sugoi! list of best manga of 2013 for female readers, and twelfth in the 2014 edition. It received the New Face Award at the 16th Japan Media Arts Festival in 2012.

== See also ==
- King in Limbo, another manga series by the same author
- Tengu no Daidokoro, another manga series by the same author
