= The Empty Table =

1985 film by Masaki Kobayashi

- Directed by: Masaki Kobayashi
- Written by: Masaki Kobayashi; Fumiko Enchi
- Starring: Tatsuya Nakadai; Mayumi Ogawa; Kie Nakai; Kiichi Nakai; Shima Iwashita
- Cinematography: Kōzō Okazaki
- Edited by: Nobuo Ogawa
- Music by: Tōru Takemitsu
- Release date: 1985
- Country: Japan
- Language: Japanese

The Empty Table (Japanese: 食卓のない家, romanized: Shokutaku no nai ie), also known as Family Without a Dinner Table, is a 1985 Japanese drama film co-written and directed by Masaki Kobayashi, at his final film. Based on the novel with the same name by Fumiko Enchi, it was entered into the main competition at the 42nd Venice International Film Festival. At the 1986 Japan Academy Film Prizes, it received nominations for Best Actress and Best Art Direction, and won the award for Best Score.

== Cast ==
- Tatsuya Nakadai as Nabayuki Kidoji
- Mayumi Ogawa as Yamiko Kidoji
- Kie Nakai as Tamae Kidoji
- Kiichi Nakai as Otohiko Kidoji
- Takayuki Takemoto (ja) as Osamu Kidoji
- Shima Iwashita as Kiwa Nakahara
- Mikijiro Hira as Kawabe
- Azusa Mano as Kanae Sawaki
- Shinobu Otake as Miyoko Asano
