= Willful Murder =

1981 film

- DVD cover
- Directed by: Kei Kumai
- Written by: Kimio Yada; Ryūzō Kikushima
- Produced by: Masayuki Satō
- Starring: Tatsuya Nakadai; Kei Yamamoto; Yōko Asaji
- Cinematography: Shunichiro Nakao
- Edited by: Osamu Inoue
- Music by: Masaru Sato
- Production company: Haiyuza Eiga Hoso Company
- Release date: 7 November 1981 (Japan)
- Running time: 132 minutes
- Country: Japan
- Language: Japanese

Willful Murder (Japanese: 日本の熱い日々 謀殺・下山事件, Hepburn: Nihon no Atsui Hibi Bōsatsu: Shimoyama Jiken) is a 1981 Japanese drama film directed by Kei Kumai. It dramatizes a journalist's investigation into the Shimoyama incident. It was entered into the 32nd Berlin International Film Festival.

== Cast ==
- Tatsuya Nakadai
- Kei Yamamoto
- Yōko Asaji
- Kaneko Iwasaki
- Ichirō Nakatani
- Junkichi Orimoto
- Daisuke Ryū
- Kōji Yakusho
- Kinzō Shin
- Noboru Nakaya
