= Yonki-no-kai Productions =

Defunct company

Yonki-no-kai Productions (四騎の会 The Four Horsemen Productions) was a Japanese entertainment company formed by leading Japanese directors Akira Kurosawa, Masaki Kobayashi, Keisuke Kinoshita, and Kon Ichikawa in 1969.

In the five years since Kurosawa's last film in 1965, he had a public falling out with Toshiro Mifune. He was appointed co-director of the Japanese-American production Tora! Tora! Tora!, working on script development and pre-production for two years, only to be replaced by Toshio Masuda and Kinji Fukasaku two weeks after shooting had commenced. The Japanese film industry was also going through a turbulent time, with TV viewership rising and the increasing popularity of Hollywood films among the younger audience. There was a 40% decrease in theatres that played only Japanese movies during the same period. Many production houses had either shut down or were forced to produce pink films for revenue. In these circumstances, Kurosawa formed the Yonki-no-kai production company with three other leading directors of the era to finance his next project with the aim of producing "films that would rejuvenate the flagging industry", as noted by Stuart Galbraith.

The directors had planned to direct a film each in turn, initially deciding on a period drama Dora-heita as their first film, but it was deemed too expensive. They later settled on the idea of making Dodes'ka-den, based on the 1962 novel A City Without Seasons by Shūgorō Yamamoto. It was also Kurosawa's first color film and was shot in nine weeks for a budget of $300,000. It was released in October 1970 to a commercial failure in Japan but received praise abroad, including a nomination for the Academy Award for Best Foreign Language Film at the 44th Academy Awards.

The company was dissolved soon afterward. The failure of Dodes'ka-den meant that funds were not available for filming Dora-heita. Many years later, after the deaths of the other three partners, Ichikawa was able to produce the film adapted from the 1969 screenplay.
