= Black River (1957 film) =

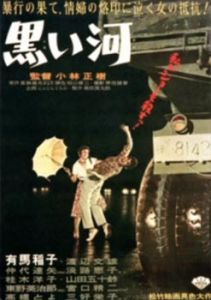
- Theatrical release poster
- Directed by: Masaki Kobayashi
- Written by: Zenzo Matsuyama; Takeo Tomishima (novel)
- Produced by: Ryotaro Kuwata
- Starring: Ineko Arima; Fumio Watanabe; Tatsuya Nakadai; Tomo Nagai; Keiko Awaji
- Cinematography: Yuharu Atsuta
- Edited by: Yoshiyasu Hamamura
- Music by: Chuji Kinoshita
- Production companies: Ninjin Club; Shochiku
- Distributed by: Shochiku
- Release date: 23 October 1957 (Japan)
- Running time: 114 minutes
- Country: Japan
- Language: Japanese

Black River (Japanese: 黒い河, Hepburn: Kuroi kawa) is a 1957 Japanese drama film directed by Masaki Kobayashi. (Note: Various sources alternately put the year of release in 1956 or 1957. Sources which list 1957 include Kinema Junpo, Donald Richie, David Desser, The New York Times, and Shochiku Online. Sources which list 1956 include the Japanese Movie Database, Shochiku, and The Criterion Collection. Kinema Junpo also lists a number of print articles on the film on its website, all published in late 1957.)

== Plot ==
University student Nishida moves into a rundown area near a US military base, where he gets acquainted with waitress Shizuko. Shizuko is raped by local gangster boss Joe and forced to be his girlfriend. Although she despises him, Shizuko is unable to put an end to their subsequent affair. Joe also helps Nishida's landlady to throw Nishida and the other tenants out of their flats in a scheme to make room for a new hotel, leaving them homeless. After a confrontation between Joe and Nishida, who has fallen in love with Shizuko as she has with him, Shizuko kills the drunken Joe by pushing him in front of a passing army truck.

== Cast ==
- Ineko Arima as Shizuko
- Fumio Watanabe as Nishida
- Tatsuya Nakadai as Joe
- Asao Sano as Sakazaki
- Tomo Nagai as Okada
- Keiko Awaji as Yasuko
- Seiji Miyaguchi as Kin
- Isuzu Yamada as Landlady
- Eijirō Tōno as Kurihara
- Yōko Katsuragi as Sachiko
- Masao Shimizu as Kuroki
- Eiko Miyoshi as Procuress
- Natsuko Kahara
- Toyo Takahashi
- Yasushi Nagata

== Legacy ==
Black River was screened at the 2005 New York Film Festival in a theatrical retrospective celebrating the Shochiku Company's 110th year.
