= The Thick-Walled Room =

1956 Japanese film

- Theatrical poster
- 壁あつき部屋
- Directed by: Masaki Kobayashi
- Screenplay by: Kōbō Abe
- Produced by: Takeshi Ogura
- Starring: Kō Mishima; Torahiko Hamada; Keiko Kishi; Tatsuya Nakadai
- Cinematography: Hiroyuki Kusuda
- Music by: Chūji Kinoshita
- Production company: Shin-ei Kurabu Pro
- Distributed by: Shochiku
- Release date: 31 October 1956 (Japan)
- Running time: 110 minutes
- Country: Japan
- Language: Japanese

The Thick-Walled Room (壁あつき部屋, Kabe atsuki heya) is a 1953 Japanese war drama film directed by Masaki Kobayashi. The film was completed in 1953, but not released before 1956.

== Plot ==
A group of former Japanese World War II soldiers, interned in Sugamo Prison as Class B and C war criminals, memorise their past. Yamashita had shot an Indonesian civilian by command of his superior Hamada and, after violent interrogations by U.S. military personnel following his arrest, was blamed by Hamada for acting without instructions at his trial. Yokota served as an interpreter in a prisoner-of-war camp and was ordered to participate in the flagellation of a prisoner, who later died of the maltreatment. He clings to memories of a young woman named Yoshiko, who now earns her money as a prostitute in Shinjuku. Kawanashi is haunted by images of killing a prisoner with a bayonet and eventually hangs himself in his cell.

When Yamashita learns that his mother and sister have fallen victim to Hamada's profiteering schemes, he attempts to break out to seek revenge, but is caught. Yokota tells his communist activist brother about Yamashita's fate, who publishes the story in a newspaper. As a result, Yamashita refuses to speak with Yokota.

With the help of an appeal by his fellow prisoners, Yamashita is allowed to visit his home after his mother's death. Still intent on killing Hamada despite his sister's pleas, he goes to see his former superior, but, confronted with Hamada's cowardice, lets go of his plan and returns to Sugamo in time. He gives Yokota a package of sweets which he bought on the way, indicating that he has forgiven him.

== Cast ==
- Kō Mishima as Yokota
- Torahiko Hamada as Yamashita
- Tsutomu Shimomoto as Kimura
- Kinzō Shin as Kawanishi
- Ryōhei Uchida as Yokota's brother
- Toshiko Kobayashi as Yamashita's sister
- Keiko Kishi as Yoshiko
- Eitarō Ozawa as Hamada (credited as Sakae Ozawa)
- Yūko Mochizuki as Hamada's wife
- Ryūji Kita
- Kōji Mitsui
- Yūnosuke Itō as Korean
- Tatsuya Nakadai (uncredited)

== Production ==
The Thick-Walled Room was produced by Shin-ei Kurabu Pro, an independent company affiliated with the Shochiku studio. The screenplay was written by Kōbō Abe, based on actual diaries of jailed Japanese soldiers which had been published in book form in 1953. Filming of The Thick-Walled Room was completed the same year. The film marked the screen debut of actor Tatsuya Nakadai who appeared in a small role.

== Release ==
Due to the film's subject matter, the imprisonment of Japanese soldiers for committed war crimes and their mistreatment by members of the American forces, Shochiku shelved its release for three years. An article published in the Asahi Shimbun newspaper on 2 December 1953 stated that the studio board's decision had been made because of the film's anti-American content. According to film critic Michael Koresky, the Japanese Government was concerned that the film would offend the United States and demanded cuts which Kobayashi refused, resulting in the delay of the release. Shirō Kido, head of the Shochku studios and war criminal, publicly declared that motion pictures were "a vehicle for the expression of emotion and not theory".

== Reception ==
Reviewing the film in their 1959 book The Japanese Film – Art & Industry, Donald Richie and Joseph L. Anderson found the presentation of the imprisoned soldiers as innocents and of the war trials as unjust debatable, but acknowledged that it was one of the few Japanese motion pictures at the time which brought up the question of responsibility for the war.

In her 2013 essay "Film and Soldier: Japanese War Movies in the 1950s", Sandra Wilson expressed an even more critical view, arguing that Kobayashi, contrary to his "deeply principled" The Human Condition, took the "clear view that such ordinary soldiers should not be considered criminals in any normal sense of the word", thus joining in a series of films (the others being Sugamo no haha and Yamashita Tomoyuki) that "attempted to influence the general view of war criminals at a time when public opinion on the subject was still evolving".

In his 2017 book on director Kobayashi, author Stephen Prince titled The Thick-Walled Room the director's "true debut film, the first picture that shows fully the artistic profile that he would make his own" and "the first of his mature works of social criticism". Still, Prince joined in the canon that Kobayashi's film suggested that the depicted war crimes were "occasional rather than systematic" and that the Japanese prisoners were held unfairly, suffering from the oppression imposed by a foreign power.
