= Inn of Evil =

- Film poster
- Directed by: Masaki Kobayashi
- Screenplay by: Kyoko Miyazaki
- Based on: Fukagawa anrakutei by Shugoro Yamamoto
- Produced by: Masayuki Sato; Ginichi Kishimoto; Hieyuki Shiino
- Starring: Tatsuya Nakadai; Komaki Kurihara; Wakako Sakai; Kei Yamamoto; Kei Satō; Nakamura Kanemon; Shintaro Katsu
- Cinematography: Kozo Okazaki
- Edited by: Hisashi Sagara
- Music by: Toru Takemitsu
- Production companies: Haiyu-za Film; Toho
- Distributed by: Toho
- Release date: 11 September 1971 (Japan)
- Running time: 120 minutes
- Country: Japan
- Language: Japanese

Inn of Evil (Japanese: いのちぼうにふろう, Hepburn: Inochi bonifuro) is a 1971 Japanese film directed by Masaki Kobayashi. The film set during the Tokugawa Shogunate and is about a tavern in Edo which smugglers use as a base of operations. The film was adapted from the novel Fukagawa anarakutei (transl. Fukagawa Comfort Restaurant) by Shugoro Yamamoto. The film received four awards at the Mainichi Film Concours, including Best Actor and Best Score.

== Cast ==
- Tatsuya Nakadai as Sadahichi
- Komaki Kurihara as Omitsu
- Wakako Sakai as Okiwa
- Kei Yamamoto
- Kei Satō as Yohei
- Shigeru Koyama as Officer Kanedo
- Yūsuke Takita
- Shin Kishida
- Ichirō Nakatani
- Nakamura Kanemon III as Ikuzo
- Shintaro Katsu as the nameless wanderer

== Release ==
Inn of Evil received a roadshow theatrical release in Japan on 11 September 1971 where it was distributed by Toho. It received a general release 16 October 1971.

The film was released theatrically in the United States by Toho International with English subtitles. It was released in March 1972, with a 120-minute running time.

== Reception ==
The film received many awards at the Mainichi Film Concours. These included Shintaro Katsu for Best actor (along with his work in Zatoichi Meets the One-Armed Swordsman and Kitsune no kureta akanbo.) The second was Best Score for Toru Takemitsu (along with his scores for The Ceremony and Silence). The final award were for Best Cinematography and Best Art Direction.

== See also ==
- List of Japanese films of 1971

== Footnotes ==
=== References ===
- Galbraith IV, Stuart (2008). The Toho Studios Story: A History and Complete Filmography. Scarecrow Press. ISBN 978-1461673743.
