= Haruo Inoue =

Japanese film director

Haruo Inoue (井上春生 Inoue Haruo, born January 3, 1963, in Nara, Japan) is a Japanese film director artist.

== Life and career ==
In 1991, Haruo Inoue started his career by directing a short film titled "An Expressed Messenger and a Wandering Samurai", a samurai period drama modeled after Steven Spielberg`s "Duel", which was invited at Yubari International Fantastic Adventure Film Festival 1991. Through the subsequent years, Haruo Inoue wrote and directed numerous TV documentaries and dramas, such as "Impala and Lion" and "Cinderella Rings Twice", along with several music videos and commercial films.

Haruo Inoue has received several awards from All Japan Radio & Television Commercial Confederation and Japan Advertisers Association Inc. for many of his projects.

In 2005, Haruo Inoue triggered a cutting-edge phenomenon of short films distributed through collaboration with a cellular phone company, au, to achieve theatrical release, with films such as "Tameiki no Riyu" and "Bird Call" starting top fashion models.

In 2006, Haruo Inoue continued to break new ground with another collaborative project, this time with EPIC Records Japan, with EPIC Records Japan's first promotional movie series as a recording studio called Cinemusica. He released films such as "Cherry Pie", "Tokyo no uso", "White Mexico", and "Onpu to Konbu (The musical note and the seaweed)" as a part of Cinemusica series, by featuring EPIC Records Japan's artists with MTV Japan in partnership.

In January 2008, all of Haruo Inoue's films, along with Cinemusica series, were featured in Shibuya box film festival in Tokyo and lala Yokohama movie festival. In September 2008, "Onpu to Konbu", His cinematic treatment of Asperger syndrome, was invited to The 2nd Chungmuro International Film Festival in Seoul, Korea.

Haruo Inoue's interest in making the co-project movies with International film creators has led him to establish an NPO and a general incorporated association Peace Cuisine Film Initiative, in order to assist re-construction of movie-culture in Afghanistan. Through them, He has been holding annual Afghanistan movie festival in Tokyo since 2005, and has been organizing to make feature films with Afghanistan's film makers, such as "Kabul Triangle" by students of Department of Arts in Kabul University, and "The Roots" by Eng. Latif, CEO of Afghan Film, while inviting several creators of Japanese TV commercial industry as collaborators.

== Filmography ==
1. An Expressed Messenger and a Wandering Samurai (1991)
  shown at the 1991 Yubari International Fantastic Film Festival
2. Tameiki no Riyu (2005)
3. Bird Call (2005)
4. Kabul Triangle (2005) (Japan Afghanistan collaboration documentary movie)
5. Cherry Pie (2006)
6. Tokyo no Uso (2006)
7. White Mexico (2007)
8. The Roots (2008), Composer:Shinichi Osawa, (Executive Producer) (Japan Afghanistan collaboration movie)
  2009-The Kabul International Documentary & Short Film Festival
  2009-South Asian Film Festival in India
9. Onpu to Konbu (The musical note and the seaweed) (2008)
  2008-The 2nd Chungmuro International Film Festival In Seoul
10. Mugonka, Romances sans paroles (2009), (Executive Producer)
11. Toku no Sora (2010), (Japan Korean collaboration movie)

== Awards ==
1. Shiesido Commercial Film
  2001- Japan Advertisers Association Inc.
  2006- All Japan Radio & Television Commercial Confederation

== See also ==
- Cinema of Japan
