= Hymn to a Tired Man =

1968 film

- Film poster
- Directed by: Masaki Kobayashi
- Screenplay by: Sakae Hirosawa
- Based on: Dokkoisho by Shusaku Endo
- Produced by: Ichirô Satô; Hidenori Shiino; Masanori Sato
- Starring: Makoto Fujita; Michiyo Aratama; Toshio Kurosawa
- Cinematography: Kozo Okazaki
- Edited by: Michio Suwa
- Music by: Toru Takemitsu
- Production company: Tokyo Eiga
- Distributed by: Toho
- Release date: 8 June 1968 (Japan)
- Running time: 130 minutes
- Country: Japan
- Language: Japanese

Hymn to a Tired Man (Japanese: 日本の青春, Hepburn: Nihon no Seishun; lit. 'Youth of Japan') is a 1968 Japanese drama film directed by Masaki Kobayashi.

== Cast ==
- Michiyo Aratama as Yoshiko
- Makoto Fujita
- Toshio Kurosawa as Zensaku's son
- Tomoko Naraoka as Zensaku's wife
- Wakako Sakai
- Kei Satō as Suzuki
- Masao Mishima as narrator

== Release ==
Hymn to a Tired Man was released theatrically in Japan on 8 June 1968 where it was distributed by Toho. The film was released theatrically in the United States by Toho International with English subtitles. It was entered into the 1969 Cannes Film Festival.
