= Kei Yamamoto =

Japanese actor (1940–2022)

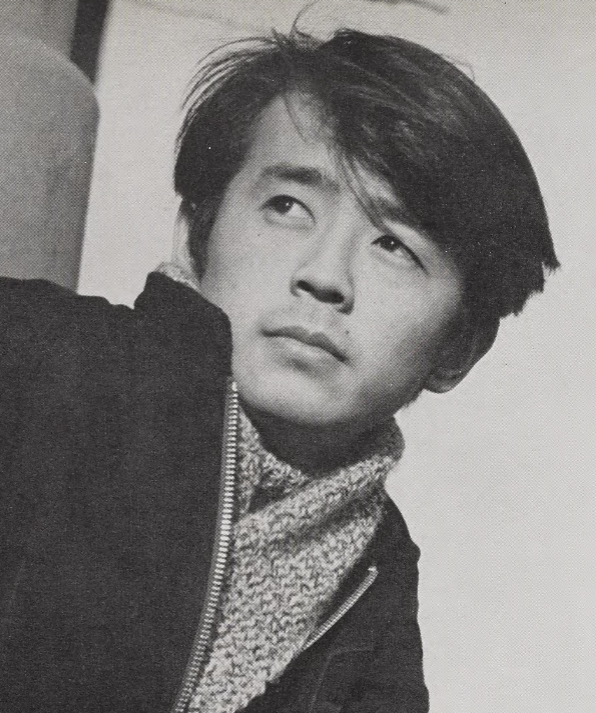
- Born: July 1, 1940; Osaka, Japan
- Died: 31 March 2022 (aged 81)
- Occupation: Actor
- Years active: 1962–2017
- Relatives: Gaku Yamamoto (Brother); Satsuo Yamamoto (Uncle)

Kei Yamamoto (山本 圭, Yamamoto Kei) (July 1, 1940 – March 31, 2022) was a Japanese actor.

== Filmography ==
=== Film ===
Date	Work	Role	Notes	Ref.
1962	Ningen	Sankichi		
1963	Bushido, Samurai Saga	Kazuma Noda		
1967	Tales of the Ninja			
1971	Inn of Evil			
1975	The Bullet Train	Masaru Koga		
1978	Never Give Up	Professor Furuhashi		
1982	Onimasa	Kyōsuke Tanabe		
1986	Lost in the Wilderness	Wakita		
1987	Hachiko Monogatari	Serizawa		
2010	Sp: The Motion Picture	Yūzō Asada		
2011	SP: The Motion Picture II	Yūzō Asada		
2013	Sweetheart Chocolate	Yūsaku Katō		

=== Television ===
Date	Work	Role	Notes	Ref.
1993–97	Under the Same Roof	Hirose	2 seasons	
2002	Doremisora	Shunsuke Enomoto		
2006	Kōmyō ga Tsuji	Azai Hisamasa	Taiga drama	
2007	SP	Yūzō Asada		
2009	Tenchijin	Yoshie Munenobu	Taiga drama	
2013	Yae's Sakura	Yamakawa Shigehide	Taiga drama	
2016	Shizumanu Taiyō			
2017	Yasuragi no Sato	Iwakura		
