= The Inheritance (1962 film) =

- Theatrical release poster
- からみ合い
- Directed by: Masaki Kobayashi
- Written by: Koichi Inagaki
- Screenplay by: Koichi Inagaki
- Based on: The Inheritance by Norio Nanjo
- Produced by: Masaki Kobayashi; Shigeru Wakatsuki
- Starring: Tatsuya Nakadai, Keiko Kishi
- Cinematography: Takashi Kawamata
- Music by: Tōru Takemitsu
- Release date: February 17, 1962 (Japan)
- Running time: 97 minutes
- Country: Japan
- Language: Japanese

The Inheritance (Japanese: からみ合い) is a 1962 Japanese drama film directed by Masaki Kobayashi. The plot centres around a struggle between associates of a dying businessman for his fortune which he intends to leave for his three illegitimate children.

The film was nominated for and won the 1964 BAFTA United Nations Award.

== Summary ==
Senzo Kawahara is a wealthy businessman who discovers that he has cancer and only six months to live. He reveals to his associates that he has three missing illegitimate children and tasks them with finding them so that his wealth can be divided among whichever of the three descendants he deems worthy, while his wife will also receive her legally guaranteed portion. This sets off a struggle of scheming and deception as they attempt to appropriate all the money for themselves.

== Reception ==
Alexander Jacoby considered it to be an "uncharacteristically sardonic film, reminiscent of a Kon Ichikawa or Yasuzo Masumura satire, which exposed the purely commercial values of the selfish rich." Stephen Prince states:

There is no pathos of any kind in The Inheritance. It is a savage film, almost cruel in its unflinching gaze at these monstrous characters, and neither Kawahara nor anyone else transforms their lives, except in one sense only. Yasuko perpetrates a cunning and successful swindle that makes her rich. She exchanges a cramped, single-room apartment that she hates and thinks of as a tomb for wealth and leisure and a life unencumbered by obligations to others. That is the only personal transformation the film allows.

The film received praise from Jacob Siskind in The Montreal Star.

The film was nominated for and won the 1964 BAFTA United Nations Award.

== Cast ==
- Keiko Kishi as Yasuko, Kawahara's secretary
- Tatsuya Nakadai as Kikuo Furukawa, Yoshida's assistant
- Minoru Chiaki as Fujii, Kawahara's chief secretary
- Sō Yamamura as Senzo Kawahara, the dying businessman
- Misako Watanabe as Satoe, Kawahara's wife
- Seiji Miyaguchi as Yoshida, Kawahara's counsel
- Yūsuke Kawazu as Sadao, Kawahara's son
- Mari Yoshimura as Mariko, Kawahara's daughter
- Osamu Takizawa as Kyoichiro Kurayama, Attorney at Law
- Kōji Mitsui as photo studio customer (cameo)
- Tōru Abe as detective
- Jun Hamamura as Mariko's stepfather
- Kinzō Shin as Dr. Ishimado
- Noriko Sengoku as Sayo, former lover of Kawahara
- Kin Sugai as Sayo's friend
- Fumie Kitahara as Sadao's mother
- Ryūji Kita as Sadao's stepfather
- Fusako Maki as Mariko's mother
- Kei Satō as policeman
- Kunie Tanaka as thug
