= International Military Tribunal for the Far East (film) =

Tokyo Trial
- Film poster
- Kanji: 東京裁判
- Literal meaning: Tokyo Trial
- Revised Hepburn: Tōkyō Saiban
- Directed by: Masaki Kobayashi
- Written by: Masaki Kobayashi; Kiyoshi Ogasawara; Shun Inagaki (story)
- Narrated by: Kei Satō
- Edited by: Keiichi Uraoka
- Music by: Toru Takemitsu
- Release date: June 4, 1983 (Japan)
- Running time: 277 minutes
- Country: Japan
- Language: Japanese

Tokyo Trial (Japanese: 東京裁判, Hepburn: Tōkyō Saiban) is a 1983 Japanese documentary film on the International Military Tribunal for the Far East, directed by Masaki Kobayashi.

== Awards and nominations ==
26th Blue Ribbon Awards

- Won: Best Film
