= Samurai Rebellion =

- Theatrical poster for Samurai Rebellion
- Directed by: Masaki Kobayashi
- Screenplay by: Shinobu Hashimoto
- Based on: Hairyozuma shimatsu by Yasuhiko Takiguchi
- Produced by: Tomoyuki Tanaka; Toshiro Mifune
- Starring: Toshiro Mifune; Yoko Tsukasa; Go Kato; Tatsuya Nakadai
- Cinematography: Kazuo Yamada
- Edited by: Hisashi Sagara
- Music by: Toru Takemitsu
- Production companies: Toho; Mifune Productions
- Distributed by: Toho
- Release date: 27 May 1967 (Japan)
- Running time: 128 minutes
- Country: Japan

Samurai Rebellion (Japanese: 上意討ち 拝領妻始末, Hepburn: Jōi-uchi: Hairyō zuma shimatsu) is a 1967 Japanese jidaigeki film directed by Masaki Kobayashi. The film is based on a short story of the same name by Yasuhiko Takiguchi. Its screenplay was written by Shinobu Hashimoto.

Film historian Donald Richie suggests an approximate translation for its original Japanese title: Rebellion: Receive the Wife.

== Plot ==
In 1725, during the Edo period of Japan, Isaburo Sasahara (Toshiro Mifune) is a vassal of the daimyo of the Aizu clan, Masakata Matsudaira. Isaburo is one of the most skilled swordsmen in the land, whose main rival is his good friend Tatewaki Asano (Tatsuya Nakadai). One day, one of the daimyo's advisors orders Isaburo's elder son Yogoro (Go Kato) to marry the daimyo's ex-concubine, Ichi (Yoko Tsukasa), even though she is the mother to one of the daimyo's sons. With much trepidation, the family agrees. Ichi and Yogoro fall in love, marry, and give birth to a daughter, Tomi.

However, the daimyo's primary heir dies, and he orders Ichi to rejoin his household to care for their son and heir. The family refuses, but Ichi is coerced to return by Isaburo's younger son, as otherwise her husband and father-in-law will be ordered to commit seppuku for their insolence and insubordination. Isaburo counters that he will comply only if the heads of the daimyo and his two primary advisors are brought to him first. Isaburo sends his younger son and wife away and dismisses his household servants.

The daimyo's steward, accompanied by a platoon of 20 samurai, brings Ichi to the Sasahara house and tries to force her at spearpoint to renounce her marriage to Yogoro and join the daimyo's household. The daimyo also offers to commute Isaburo and Yogoro's sentences to life confinement in a shrine outside his castle. Instead of abandoning her husband and rejoining the daimyo, she throws herself onto a spear. Yogoro goes to her side and is killed with her in his arms. Enraged, Isaburo kills the steward's entire party, leaving the steward for last as he attempts to flee.

Burying the dead couple, Isaburo now decides to take his case to the shogun in Edo accompanied by Tomi. Tatewaki, who is guarding the gate, cannot permit Isaburo to pass, and a climactic duel between the friends follows. Isaburo is the victor, but assassins hidden nearby cut Isaburo down with musket fire. As Isaburo dies, Tomi's wet nurse comforts the baby.

== Cast ==
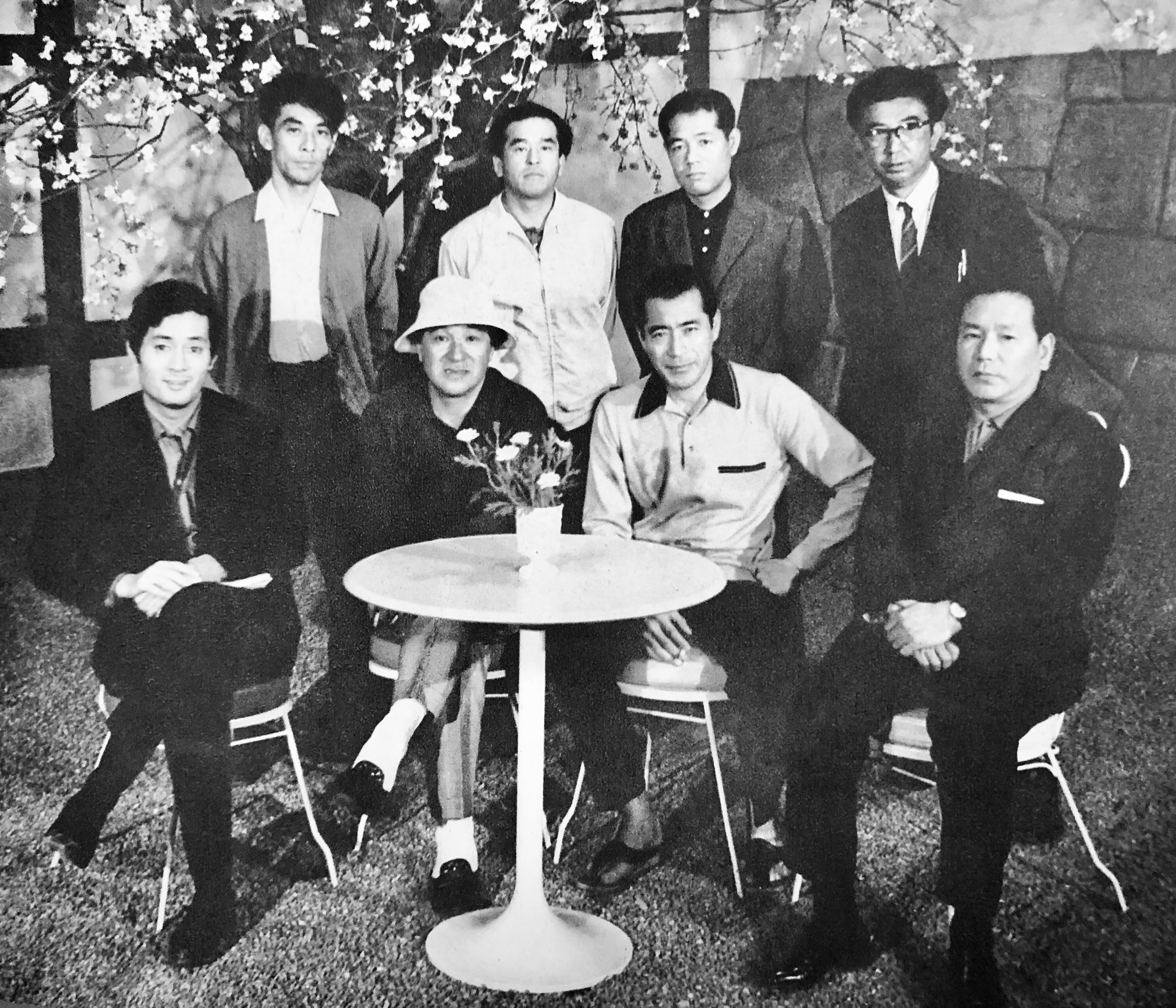
Staff and cast of Samurai Rebellion. Front row, from left: Tatsuya Nakadai, Masaki Kobayashi, Toshiro Mifune, Tomoyuki Tanaka. Back row, from left, Yoichi Matsue, Kazuo Yamada, Shigenosuke Okuyama, Yasuyoshi Tami.

- Toshiro Mifune as Isaburo Sasahara
- Yoko Tsukasa as Ichi Sasahara
- Go Kato as Yogoro Sasahara
- Tatsuya Nakadai as Tatewaki Asano
- Shigeru Koyama as Geki Takahashi
- Masao Mishima as Sanzaemon Yanase
- Isao Yamagata as Shobei Tsuchiya
- Tatsuyoshi Ehara as Bunzo Sasahara
- Etsuko Ichihara as Kiku
- Tatsuo Matsumura as Masakata Matsudaira
- Takamaru Sasaki as Kenmotsu Sasahara
- Jun Hamamura as Hyoemon Shiomi

== Music ==
The music was composed by Tōru Takemitsu, and is performed almost exclusively on traditional Japanese instruments, including shakuhachi, biwa, and taiko.

== Release ==
Samurai Rebellion received a roadshow release in Japan on 27 May 1967 where it was distributed by Toho. The film received a wide theatrical release in Japan on 3 June 1967 and was released by Toho International in December 1967, with English-subtitles and a 120-minute running time. It has been released to home video as Samurai Rebellion.

== Awards ==
Samurai Rebellion received awards in Japan. Kinema Junpo recognized it for Best Film, Best Director, and Best Screenplay (alongside Japan's Longest Day). Mainichi Film Concours awarded it as Best Film of the year. Along with China is Near, it won the FIPRESCI Prize at the Venice Film Festival.

== Other adaptations ==
A TV movie remake starring Masakazu Tamura as Isaburo Sasahara and Yukie Nakama as Ichi Sasahara aired on TV Asahi in 2013. The screenplay was written by Shinobu Hashimoto.

- Naoto Ogata as Yoichiro Sasahara
- Masahiko Tsugawa as Kenmotsu Sasahara
- Ren Osugi as Masakata Matsudaira
- Takashi Sasano as Shobei Tanimura
- Meiko Kaji as Suga Sasahara
- Ken Matsudaira as Tatewaki Asano
