= Masaki Kobayashi =

Japanese film director (1916–1996)

- 小林 正樹
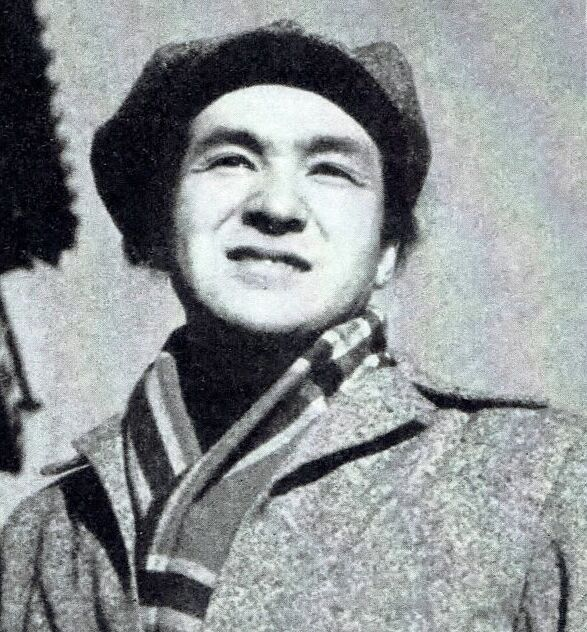
- Kobayashi in 1953
- Born: February 14, 1916; Otaru, Empire of Japan
- Died: October 4, 1996 (aged 80); Tokyo, Japan
- Education: Waseda University
- Occupations: Film director, screenwriter
- Years active: 1941, 1946–1985
- Notable work: The Human Condition trilogy (1959-1961); Harakiri (1962); Kwaidan (1964); Samurai Rebellion (1967)
- Spouse: Chiyoko Fumiya (m. 1952)
- Relatives: Kinuyo Tanaka (second cousin)
- Military career
- Allegiance: Empire of Japan
- Branch: Imperial Japanese Army
- Service years: 1942–1945
- Rank: Private
- Units: Azabu Third Regiment

Masaki Kobayashi (小林 正樹, Kobayashi Masaki; February 14, 1916 – October 4, 1996) was a Japanese filmmaker. He is best remembered for directing the epic war trilogy The Human Condition (1959–1961), the samurai films Harakiri (1962) and Samurai Rebellion (1967), and the horror anthology epic Kwaidan (1964). Senses of Cinema described him as "one of the finest depicters of Japanese society in the 1950s and 1960s." Although overshadowed by other Japanese filmmakers like Akira Kurosawa and Yasujirō Ozu in his lifetime, his work has gained wider traction in the 21st century with several of his films being ranked as some of the greatest films ever made.

== Biography ==
=== Early life (1916–1946) ===
==== Childhood and schooling (1916–1942) ====
Kobayashi was born on February 14, 1916, in Otaru, a port city on the island of Hokkaido. Kobayashi's family was a part of the upper-middle class, as his father, Yuichi, worked for Mitsui & Co., and his mother, Hisako, was part of a merchant family. He had two older brothers and a younger sister. He was also a second cousin of the actress and director Kinuyo Tanaka. The Kobayashi family descends from a samurai from Shimonoseki. Kobayashi lived in Tokyo while in elementary school, but otherwise lived in Otaru until he was 17 years-old. Kobayashi's household was warm and tolerant, and his parents encouraged the exploration of the arts. He saw a movie for the first time when he was 7 years-old, and he frequently watched movies and visited art exhibitions, concerts, and theatre performances with his mother. Kobayashi's older brother, Yasuhiko, who attended film study groups while in university, also helped further Kobayashi's understanding of film.

In 1938, Kobayashi enrolled in Waseda University in Tokyo. At the university, Kobayashi was taught by Aizu Yaichi, a poet and historian who became a mentor of Kobayashi and influenced Kobayashi's perspectives on life and art. Aizu specialized in Buddhist art, particularly that of the Nara period, and frequently brought his class to Buddhist temples. Outside of class, Kobayashi accompanied Aizu on trips to Nara and often visited Aizu's house. Due in part to Aizu's influence, Kobayashi decided to study East Asian art and philosophy. Kobayashi wrote his thesis on Murō-ji, a Buddhist temple located in Nara. He spent a month living at Murō-ji while researching its history for his thesis. Kobayashi would later work on a documentary about Aizu released in 1996.

While attending Waseda University, Kobayashi would visit Shochiku Studio to watch Kinuyo Tanaka, his second cousin, while she worked. It was during his time at Waseda University that Kobayashi began to want to become a film director.

After graduating from Waseda University in 1941, Kobayashi worked at Shochiku as a director in training for eight months. While at Shochiku, Kobayashi assisted Hiroshi Shimizu on Dawn Chorus and Hideo Ōba on Kaze kaoru niwa. During this time, Kobayashi began writing a book set in Nara, about an Oriental art scholar who enlisted in the army.

==== Wartime (1942–1946) ====
In January 1942, Kobayashi was drafted into the Azabu Third Regiment of the Imperial Japanese Army. After three months of training as a heavy machine gunner, Kobayashi was sent near Harbin in Manchuria. In September 1943, Kobayashi's squad was sent to patrol along the Ussuri river. In June 1944, his regiment returned to Japan, from which they were to be transferred to the Philippines. However, Allied submarines prevented the Azabu Third Regiment from reaching the Philippines, so they headed for Okinawa Island instead. While traveling to Okinawa, Kobayashi's group diverted to Miyako-jima in the Ryukyu Islands, where they remained until the end of the war. During that time, his group worked towards building an airfield. Kobayashi's time on the island was difficult, with his group frequently resorting to eating grasshoppers and dogs to survive. He kept a diary during his time on Miyako-jima, which documented his experience in the war and included an I-novel about the loss of his youth. In his diary, Kobayashi shows support for the Japanese war effort, but laments the death and destruction that the war caused. Kobayashi never participated in frontline fighting during his time in the army. Kobayashi regarded himself as a pacifist and a socialist, and resisted by refusing promotion to a rank higher than private.

After the war ended, Kobayashi spent nearly a year in a prisoner of war labor camp in Kadena, Okinawa. At the camp, Kobayashi ran a theater company with other inmates, and produced several shows. Kobayashi was released from the labor camp in November 1946. Upon returning home, he learned that his father had died in 1945 and that his older brother, Yasuhiko, died in battle in China in 1944.

=== Film career (1946–1996) ===
==== Assisting Kinoshita (1946–1953) ====
After returning to Japan in 1946, Kobayashi rejoined Shochiku as assistant. He was initially assigned to assist Keisuke Sasaki, but then was assigned to Keisuke Kinoshita. During his time helping Kinoshita, Kobayashi grew to admire the compassion, intelligence and skill in directing of Kinoshita. The two bonded over shared experiences in the war and in the deaths of their mothers. Kobayashi's first job under Kinoshita was as a second assistant director on Phoenix in 1947. In 1948, Kobayashi was promoted to the position of chief assistant director on Apostasy. He remained as a chief assistant director for the rest of his time spent as an assistant to Kinoshita. In 1949, Kobayashi co-scripted Broken Drum with Kinoshita. The final Kinoshita film that Kobayashi assisted with was A Japanese Tragedy, released in 1953. In 1953, Kinoshita began looking for material that could be adapted for Kobayashi's debut film. Kinoshita had Shochiku purchase the rights to the Jinkō Teien novel, with the intent of the novel being used for Kobayashi's debut film. Kinoshita would end up adapting the novel himself in the 1954 film The Garden of Women.

==== Early films (1953–1959) ====
Kobayashi's directorial debut was in 1952 with My Son's Youth. This film was part of an initiative by Shochiku to release short films, called "sister films", that were intended as introductions to new directors. On April 1, 1952, Kobayashi married Chiyoko Fumiya, an actress at Shochiku. In 1953, Sincerity was released, which was Kobayashi's first feature length film. The film was written by Kobayashi's mentor, Keisuke Kinoshita. Both My Son's Youth and Sincerity drew inspiration from Kobayashi's family and childhood, with some of the characters being modeled after members of his family.

In 1953, Kobayashi finished filming The Thick-Walled Room, about Class B and Class C war criminals being held in Sugamo Prison. The film was based on the diaries of real war criminals and was a substantial departure from the type of films Shochiku typically made at that time. Shochiku initially refused to release The Thick-Walled Room without alteration, due to the Japan government's fear that the film's criticism of the Allied occupation of Japan would upset the United States. Kobayashi refused to cut any content, so the film was not released until 1956. The Thick-Walled Room hurt Kobayashi's reputation within Shochiku, so he attempted to reestablish himself by making his next four films more similar to the typical style of Shochiku.

In 1954, Three Loves was released. This film features scenes shot inside the same church that Kobayashi and Chiyoko Fumiya were married in. Later in 1954, Somewhere Under the Broad Sky was released. This film included the first appearance of Keiji Sada in a Kobayashi-directed film, who was close friends with Kobayashi and would go on to appear in 6 of Kobayashi's films. In 1956, Fountainhead was released, which was the last of Kobayashi's films that strongly resembled the typical Shochiku style.

In 1956, The Thick-Walled Room was released to the public. Later that year, I Will Buy You was released, about corruption in baseball scouting. In 1957, Black River was released, about the crime and prostitution that arose around US bases in Japan during and after the American occupation. This was the first of Kobayashi's films to star Tatsuya Nakadai in a major role. Nakadai would become a mainstay of Kobayashi's film, starring in 9 of Kobayashi's next 13 films.

==== Peak of recognition (1959–1967) ====
From 1959 to 1961, Kobayashi directed The Human Condition (1959–1961), a trilogy on the effects of World War II on a Japanese pacifist and socialist. The total length of the films is almost ten hours, which makes it one of the longest fiction films ever made for theatrical release.

In 1962 he directed Harakiri, which won the Jury Prize at the 1963 Cannes Film Festival. The same year, he also directed The Inheritance which won the BAFTA United Nations award in 1964.

In 1964, Kobayashi made Kwaidan (1964), his first color film, a collection of four ghost stories drawn from books by Lafcadio Hearn. Kwaidan won the Special Jury Prize at the 1965 Cannes Film Festival, and received an Academy Award nomination for Best Foreign Language Film.

==== Later films (1967–1996) ====
In 1968, Akira Kurosawa, Keisuke Kinoshita, Kon Ichikawa and Kobayashi founded the directors group, Shiki no kai-The Four Horsemen Club, in an attempt to create movies for younger generations.

In 1969, he was a member of the jury at the 19th Berlin International Film Festival.

He was also a candidate for directing the Japanese sequences for Tora! Tora! Tora! after Akira Kurosawa left the film. But instead Kinji Fukasaku and Toshio Masuda were chosen. In 1985, he directed his last film, The Empty Table, which was entered in the main competition at the 42nd Venice International Film Festival.

In 1990, Kobayashi was awarded the Order of the Rising Sun by the Japanese government and the Order of Arts and Letters by the French government.

One of his grand projects was a film on Yasushi Inoue's novel about Buddhist China, Tun Huang, which never came to fruition.

== Selected filmography ==
The following is only a selection of significant films directed by Kobayashi; a more comprehensive list of movies featuring his contributions is covered in a separate article.

- The Thick-Walled Room (released in 1956)
- I Will Buy You (1956)
- Black River (1957)
- No Greater Love (1959)
- Road to Eternity (1959)
- A Soldier's Prayer (1961)
- The Inheritance (1962)
- Harakiri (1962)
- Kwaidan (1964)
- Samurai Rebellion (1967)
- Hymn to a Tired Man (1968)
- Inn of Evil (1971)
- The Fossil (1975)
- Tokyo Trial (1983)
- The Empty Table (1985)

== Awards and honors ==
Year of award or honor	Name of award or honor	Awarding organization	Country of Origin	Film title (if applicable)
1960	San Giorgio Prize	Venice Film Festival	Italy	The Human Condition
1960	Pasinetti Award	Venice Film Festival	Italy	The Human Condition
1961	Best Film	Mainichi Film Awards	Japan	A Soldier's Prayer
1961	Best Director	Mainichi Film Awards	Japan	A Soldier's Prayer
1962	Best Film	Mainichi Film Awards	Japan	Harakiri
1963	Special Jury Prize	Cannes Film Festival	France	Harakiri
1965	Special Jury Prize	Cannes Film Festival	France	Kwaidan
1967	Best Film of the Year	Kinema Junpo	Japan	Samurai Rebellion
1967	Best Director	Kinema Junpo	Japan	Samurai Rebellion
1967	FIPRESCI Prize	International Federation of Film Critics		Samurai Rebellion
1967	Best Film	Mainichi Film Awards	Japan	Samurai Rebellion
1975	Best Film	Mainichi Film Awards	Japan	The Fossil
1983	Best Film	Blue Ribbon Awards	Japan	Tokyo Trials
1990	Order of Arts and Letters	French government	France	
1990	Order of the Rising Sun	Japanese government	Japan	
1996	Special Award	Mainichi Film Awards	Japan	
