= The Fossil (film) =

- DVD cover
- Kanji: 化石
- Revised Hepburn: Kaseki
- Directed by: Masaki Kobayashi
- Screenplay by: Shun Inagaki; Takeshi Yoshida
- Based on: Kaseki by Yasushi Inoue
- Produced by: Masayuki Sato; Gin'ichi Kishimoto
- Starring: Shin Saburi; Mayumi Ogawa; Keiko Kishi
- Cinematography: Kōzō Okazaki
- Edited by: Keiichi Uraoka
- Music by: Tōru Takemitsu
- Production companies: Haiyuza Theatre Company; Shiki no kai
- Distributed by: Toho (theatrical)
- Release dates: 1972 (TV); October 4, 1975 (theatrical)
- Running time: 450 minutes (TV); 200 minutes (theatrical)
- Country: Japan
- Language: Japanese

The Fossil (Japanese: 化石, Hepburn: Kaseki) is a Japanese TV miniseries which screened in eight parts between 31 January and 20 March 1972. It was directed by Masaki Kobayashi and based on a novel by Yasushi Inoue. The series received the same year's Nippon Television Technology Award for photography.

A re-edited version was released theatrically in 1975. The theatrical version was Japan's submission to the 47th Academy Awards for the Academy Award for Best International Feature Film, but was not accepted as a nominee.

== Plot ==
Tokyo business tycoon Tajihei Kazuki is given a diagnosis of terminal cancer and must now re-assess his life and values.

== Cast ==
- Shin Saburi as Tajihei Kazuki
- Mayumi Ogawa as Akiko Kazuki
- Keiko Kishi as Madame Marcelin/Woman (Death)
- Komaki Kurihara as Kiyoko Kazuki
- Haruko Sugimura as Mother-in-law
- Hisashi Igawa as Funazu

== See also ==
- List of submissions to the 47th Academy Awards for Best Foreign Language Film
- List of Japanese submissions for the Academy Award for Best Foreign Language Film
