= Isao Natsuyagi =

Japanese actor (1939–2013)

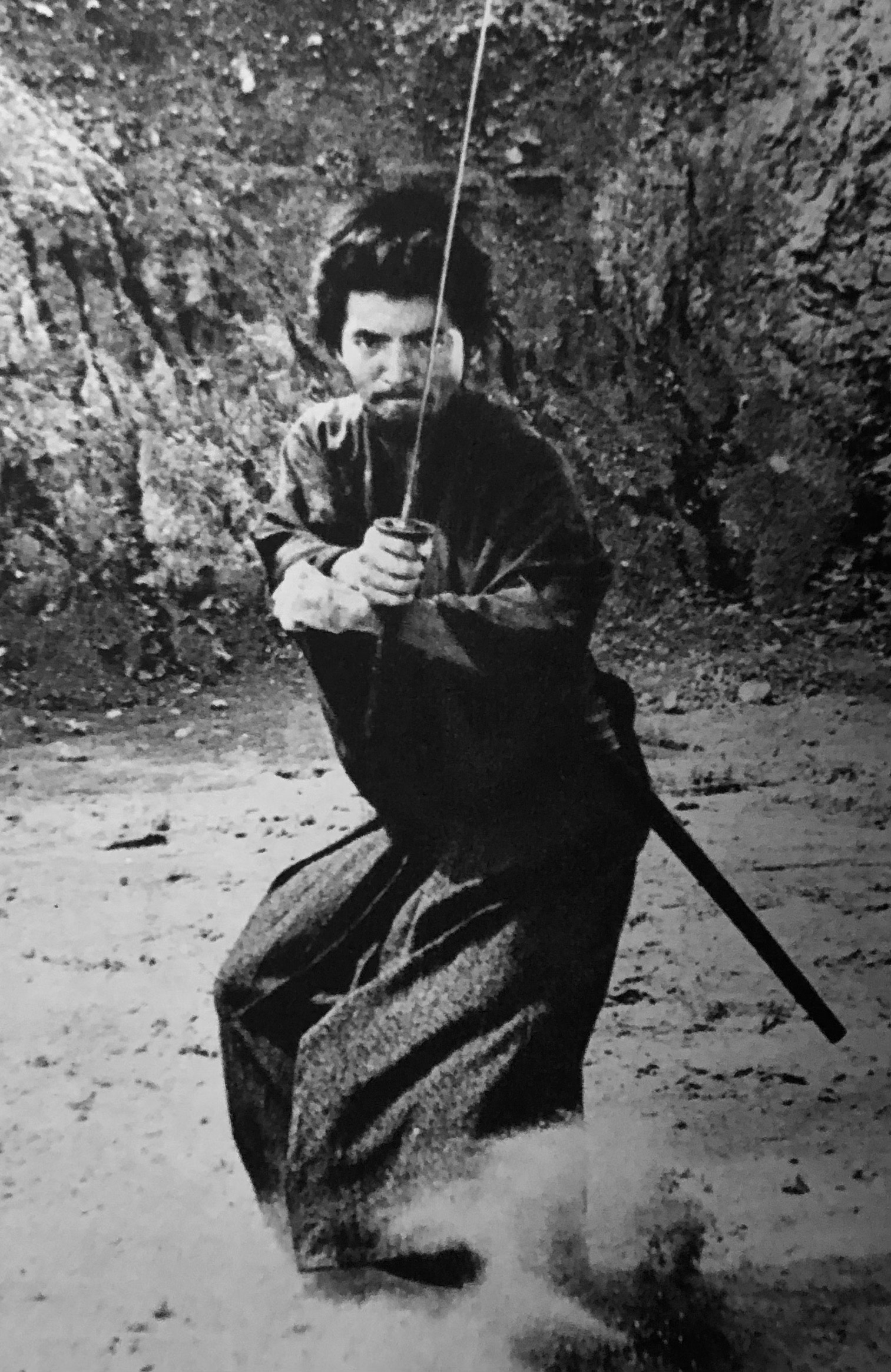
- Born: 25 December 1939; Tokyo, Japan
- Died: 11 May 2013 (aged 73); Kamakura, Kanagawa, Japan
- Occupation: Actor
- Years active: 1963–2013
- Height: 176 cm (5 ft 9 1/2 in)

Isao Natsuyagi (夏八木 勲, Natsuyagi Isao; 25 December 1939 – 11 May 2013) was a Japanese film actor. He appeared in more than 100 films from 1963 to 2013.

== Career ==
In 1960, Natsuyagi began attending the Bungakuza actors school while attending Keio University. He eventually left Keio before graduating and entered the Haiyuza actors school. After graduating in 1966, he joined the Toei studio and made his film debut with Hone made shaburu. His first starring role was in Hideo Gosha's Kiba Ōkaminosuke (1966).

== Filmography ==
=== Film ===
Year	Title	Role	Notes
1963	Jûsan-nin no shikaku		Uncredited
1966	Samurai Wolf	Ôkaminosuke	
1966	Hone-made shaburu		
1967	Samurai Wolf II	Kiba Ôkaminosuke	
1967	Eleven Samurai	Senroku Hayato	Leading role, Uncredited
1967	Âa dôki no sakura	Second Sublieutenant Nanjô	
1968	Shinobi no manji	Shinoshu Toma	
1968	Shin irezumi muzan tekka no jingi		
1968	Waga toso		
1968	Heitai yakuza godatsu		
1969	Goyokin	Kunai	
1970	Kaze no tengu		
1971	Shadow of Deception	Hase, reporter	
1971	Yakuza deka: Oretachi ni haka wa nai		
1971	The Wolves	Tetsunosuke Sakaki	
1972	Under the Flag of the Rising Sun		
1972	Female Convict 701: Scorpion	Tsugio Sugimi	
1973	Gendai ninkyô-shi	Funaoka	
1973	Mushukunin mikogami no jôkichi: Tasogare ni senko ga tonda		
1974	Battles Without Honor and Humanity: Police Tactics	Hiroshi Nakamoto	
1974	Hissatsu shikakenin: Shunsetsu shikake bari	Katsushirô	
1974	Violent Streets	Hama	
1974	Lubang tô no kiseki: Rikugun Nakano gakkô		
1974	Nihon Chinbotsu	Yuuki	
1974	Yoi-machi-gusa	Genji Hirata	
1974	Mutsugorô no kekkonki		
1975	Kobe Kokusai Gang	Yutaka Nakao	
1976	Kozure satsujin ken		
1976	Hiroshima jingi: Hitojichi dakkai sakusen	Takemori	
1977	Arasuka monogatari	Tachanga	
1977	Piranha-gundan: Daboshatsu no ten	Kinzo	
1977	Proof of the Man	Takashi Niimi	
1977	Yatsuhaka-mura	Yoshitaka Amako	
1978	Shogun's Samurai	Shōzaemon Bekki	
1978	Fuyu no hana	Michio Tachibana	
1978	Kumokiri Nizaemon	Kumagorô	
1978	Never Give Up	Detective Kitano	
1978	Yorû gaku zuretâ		
1979	Akuma ga kitarite fue o fuku	Lt. Todoroki	
1979	Hakuchyu no shikaku	Shichiro Tsuruoka	
1979	Ôgon no inu	Yukichi Nagayama	
1979	Hunter in the Dark	Sharaku	
1979	Kindaichi Kosuke no boken	Kouichi Sumida	
1979	G.I. Samurai	Nagao Kagetora	
1980	Virus	Dr. Nakanishi	
1980	Shogun's Ninja	Hattori Hanzo	
1982	Kaseki no kouya	Katsuaki Nakaomi	
1982	Onimasa	Kanematsu	
1983	Ushimitsu no mura	Yuzo Akagi	
1983	Nogare no machi	Detective Kuroki	
1983	Hakujasho	Inspector Murai	
1984	Irodori-gawa	Hideo Takayanagi	
1984	Fireflies in the North	Kakumu	
1984	Shanghai Rhapsody	Shirai	
1984	Ansatsu shirei	Nakatsugawa Shumei	
1985	Seijo densetsu	Moriyama	
1985	Kiken na onnatachi		
1986	Kyabarê	Bar owner	
1986	Rikon shinai onna	Seisaku Yamakawa	
1986	Bokuno onna ni teodasuna	Michio Tsuyama	
1987	Tokyo Blackout	Eiji Sakuma	
1987	Uerutaa		
1988	Tokugawa no Jotei: Ôoku	Kiyoshige Nakano	
1990	Rimeinzu: Utsukushiki yuusha-tachi	Asakichi	
1990	Gekido no 1750 nichi		
1990	Heaven and Earth	Yamamoto Kansuke	
1991	Kagerô	Tadao Kiyono	
1991	Shin gokudo no onna-tachi	Takahito Sumiya	
1992	Shura no densetsu	Yasuhiro Shibayama	
1994	Don o totta otoko		
1996	Kindaichi shonen no jikenbo		
1998	Ginga tetsudô Three-Nine: Eternal Fantasy	Narration	
1998	Kizuna	Kunihiro Sasaki	
1998	Tsuribaka Nisshi 10	Kosaku Iwashita	
1999	Niji no misaki	Sannosuke Mori, Shoko's husband	
2000	Shin otokogi: Kanketsu-hen		
2001	Desert Moon	Tsuyoshi's father	
2001	Warm Water Under a Red Bridge	Masayuki Uomi	
2001	Hotaru	Takemoto	
2002	Hi wa mata noboru	Takeda (President of Nippon Victor)	
2002	Sensen fukoku	Moriyoshi Segawa	
2003	T.R.Y.		
2003	Hitokiri Ginji	Ginji Sonezaki (2003)	
2004	Amoretto		
2005	Mata no Hi no Chika		
2005	Hinagon	Hora-ken	
2005	Kâten-kôru	Tatsuya Hashimoto	
2006	Simsons	Tamotsu Ishigami	
2006	Limit of Love: Umizaru	Kotaro Katsuta	
2007	Bizan	Kojiro Shinozaki	
2007	Futô fukutsu		
2008	Shin atsui kabe		
2009	Tsurugidake: Ten no ki		
2009	Katen no shiro	Tonami Sebe	
2010	Rosuto kuraimu: Senkô	Kôzô ogata	
2010	Pâtonâzu		
2011	Andalucia: Revenge of the Goddess	Seijuro Murakami	
2011	Kochira Katsushika-ku Kameari kouenmae hashutsujo the Movie: Kachidokibashi o heisa seyo!		
2011	My Way	Tatsuo's grandfather	South Korean film
2012	Land of Hope	Yasuhiko ono	Leading role
2012	Emperor	Teizaburō Sekiya	American film
2012	Himawari to koinu no 7-kakan	Takao Nagatomo, farmer, Himawari's first owner	
2012	Nobô no shiro		
2013	Nô Otoko		
2013	Like Father, Like Son	Ryosuke Nonomiya	
2013	Sango renjâ		
2013	Present for You	Boss	
2013	The Eternal Zero	Old Kenichiro	
2014	Haru wo seotte		
2015	Soman kokkyô 15 sai no natsu		(final film role)

=== Television ===
Year	Title	Role	Network	Notes
1968	Ryōma ga Yuku	Nagaoka Kenkichi, Kiyooka michinosuke	NHK	Taiga drama
1970-1976	Ōedo Sōsamō		TV Tokyo	
1973	Shinsho Taikōki	Yamanaka Shikanosuke	NET	
1974	Hatoko no umi	Hino Arimitsu	NHK	Asadora
1977	Kashin	Sakamoto Ryōma	NHK	Taiga drama
1985	Sanada Taiheiki	Tsubuya Matagoro	NHK	
1986	Byakkotai	Kondō Isami	NTV	
1993	Unmeitōge	Katō Sōjurō	Fuji TV	
1994	Hana no Ran	Hino Arimitsu	NHK	Taiga drama
1995	The Kindaichi Case Files	Kazuma Kurosawa	NTV	Episode 3
1997	Mōri Motonari	Sue Okifusa	NHK	Taiga drama
1998	Nemureru Mori	Naomi Itō	Fuji TV	
1998	Oda Nobunaga: Tenka wo Totta Baka	Oda Nobuhide	TBS	Special appearance, TV movie
1999	Suzuran	Ryūzō Tachibana	NHK	Asadora
2000	Aoi Tokugawa Sandai	Shima Sakon	NHK	Taiga drama
2003	Musashi	Hosokawa Tadaoki	NHK	Taiga drama
2004	Suna no Utsuwa	Shigeo Tadokoro	TBS	
2005	Fugo Keiji	Kikuemon Kambe	TV Asahi	
2007	Dondo Hare	Kishimoto	NHK	Asadora
2008-2009	Dandan	Takayasu Ichijō	NHK	Asadora
2010	Last Money: Ai no Nedan	Toshirō Mizutani	NHK	
2010	Ryōmaden	Matsudaira Shungaku	NHK	Taiga drama

=== Anime ===
Year	Title	Official Title	Role	Notes
1996	Young Kindaichi Case File: The Opera House - A New Murder	金田一少年の事件 ・ 簿オペラ座館 ・ 新たなる殺人	Isamu Kenmochi	Film
1997	Young Kindaichi Case Files: The Opera House Murder Case (File 3)	金田一少年の事件簿「オペラ座間殺人事件」ファイル3	School's teacher (guest app.)	TV series
1998	Galaxy Express 999: Eternal Fantasy	銀河鉄道999 ・ エターナル ・ ファンタジー	Narrator	Film

=== Dubbing ===
- The Bridges of Madison County – Robert Kincaid (Clint Eastwood)
- A Fistful of Dollars (1974 TBS edition) – Joe (Clint Eastwood)
- Nighthawks (1984 Fuji TV edition) – Deke DaSilva (Sylvester Stallone)

== Awards and prizes ==
Year	Award	Category	Film	Result
1979	2nd Japan Academy Prize	Best Supporting Actor	Never Give Up, Winter Flower	Nominated
1980	3rd Japan Academy Prize	Best Supporting Actor	G.I. Samurai, Hunter in the Dark, The Golden Dog	Nominated
2012	67th Mainichi Film Award	Best Actor	Land of Hope	Won
