= Masako Natsume =

Japanese actress (1957–1985)

- 夏目 雅子
- Masako Natsume on the cover of a 1997 calendar
- Born: Masako Odate; November 17, 1957; Shibuya, Tokyo, Japan
- Died: September 11, 1985 (aged 27); Shinjuku, Tokyo, Japan
- Resting place: Hōfu, Yamaguchi
- Occupation: Actress
- Years active: 1976–1985
- Height: 1.64 m (5 ft 4 1/2 in)
- Spouse: Shizuka Ijūin (1984–1985)
- Awards: Best actress, 8th Hochi Film Award (1983)

Masako Natsume (夏目 雅子, Natsume Masako; November 17, 1957 – September 11, 1985) was a Japanese actress from Tokyo. Widely popular in Japan, she gained worldwide recognition for her portrayal of Tripitaka in the TV series Monkey, which is now considered a cult classic.

== Early life ==
Masako was born Masako Odate at Japanese Red Cross Medical Center in Hiroo, Shibuya, Tokyo, the only daughter of Sue and Kazu Odate. Raised in Naka-ku, Yokohama, while in junior college in 1976 she auditioned for the lead role in Nihon TV's drama Ai ga miemasu ka ("Can you see love?"). Chosen from 4,000 applicants, she dropped out of school to pursue an acting career, playing the part under her real name Masako Odate. Masako's mother initially objected to her choice of career and requested that she not use the Odate family name if she gained further work. In 1977, she changed her name to Natsume.

In 1977, she was chosen to represent Kanebo Cosmetics, achieving great popularity after appearing topless as the "Kooky Face" girl in an ad for sunscreen. This popularity led to her recording a song later that year called "Oh! Cookie Face." Many bit parts and a few leads in movies followed, but she continued in television.

== Acting ==
In 1978-79, she played the male part of Tripitaka (Sanzō-hōshi, Japanese translation of Sanzang-fashi) in the 1970s Japanese TV program Saiyūki, which proved popular in many English-speaking countries in the 1980s, when dubbed by the BBC and titled Monkey. Masako won the part as she had matched contemporary descriptions of Sanzō-hōshi's appearance more closely than male actors who auditioned.

Specialising as well-bred but shy heroines in her movies, she was regularly criticized by the public and media for her poor acting. However, this changed in 1982 after appearing as an ambitious and immoral woman in the TV drama Shousha and as the daughter of a yakuza leader in the movie Onimasa. One of her lines from this movie, "Don't you look down on me!" (なめたらいかんぜよ, nametara ikan ze yo; literally "if you look down [on me], it would be regrettable"), became a very popular catchphrase in Japan.

She won the award for best actress at the 8th Hochi Film Award for The Catch and Time and Tide.

== Death ==
In 1984, she married Japanese author Tadaki Nishiyama, known under the pen name Shizuka Ijūin. But after only a year, she died from acute leukemia at the age of 27 in 1985, and is buried in Hōfu, Yamaguchi under the married name Masako Nishiyama.

== Legacy ==
In 1997, Canon produced a television commercial for a copy machine, featuring her photocopied images, which offered 100 free compilations of the images in a book. Canon received 230,000 applications. Masako Natsume picture books and calendars are still popular in Japan today.

In 2007, TBS broadcast a documentary on Masako's life entitled Himawari – Natsume Masako 27-nen no shōgai to haha no ai ("Sunflower: Masako Natsume, a 27-year life and a mother's love") based on the book Futari no Masako written by her mother, Sue Odate. Yagi Yūki played the part of the young Masako and Nakama Yukie portrayed her as an adult.

== Filmography ==
=== Films ===
Year	Title	Role	Director	Notes
1977	Ore no Sora (My Sky)		Masashi Matsumoto	
1977	Truck Yaro: Otoko Ippiki Momojiro The title Torakku Yaro means "truck guys" or "truck rascals"{translation required}	Masako	Norifumi Suzuki	The title Torakku Yaro means "truck guys" or "truck rascals", and the films involve two truckers and their various escapades as they travel around Japan in highly decorated trucks. The plot formula is similar to the Otoko wa Tsurai yo films. Each time Momojiro falls in love with a woman (the "Madonna") and then ends up having to help her romance with another man. The stories end with Momojiro having to race his truck to meet a deadline to rejoin the couple.
1980	The Battle of Port Arthur	Sachi Matsuo	Toshio Masuda	A Russo-Japanese War Drama about the Siege of Port Arthur. Masako plays the role of an Imperial Japanese Army officer's girlfriend who stays in Japan.
1981	Masho no Natsu (The Summer of Evil Spirits)	Sode	Yukio Ninagawa	
1982	Onimasa	Matsue Kiryuin	Hideo Gosha	It was Japan's submission to the 55th Academy Awards for the Academy Award for Best Foreign Language Film but was not accepted as a nominee.
1982	Dai Nippon Teikoku (The Great Japanese Empire)	Kyōko / Maria	Toshio Masuda	A WW2 drama where Masako plays two roles. A terminally ill Japanese student striving to become a painter and a Filipino woman.
1982	Future War 198X	Laura Gain	Tomoharu Katsumata / Toshio Masuda	Voice, An animated film with Masako providing the voice for a pilot in the United States Airforce.
1983	Time and Tide	Mayumi / Misato	Azuma Morisaki	Jidai-ya is the name of a shop. Masako plays two roles. The wife of the shops owner who walks out on him and the customer he falls in love with because she looks like his wife.
1983	Antarctica	Keiko Kitazawa	Koreyoshi Kurahara	
1983	Shōsetsu Yoshida Gakkō (Yoshida School)	Kazuko Asō	Shirō Moritani	
1983	The Catch	Tokiko Kohama	Shinji Sōmai	
1984	MacArthur's Children	Komako Nakai	Masahiro Shinoda	
1984	Fireflies in the North	Narrator	Hideo Gosha	(final film role)

=== Television ===
Year	Title	Role	Network	Notes	Ref(s)
1976	Ai Ga Miemasu Ka (Can you see love?)	Michiyo	NTV	Lead role	
1977	Akuma no Temariuta (Devil)		TBS		
1978	Ōgon no Hibi	Monica	NHK	Taiga drama	
1978	Y no Higeki (Tragedy of Y)		Fuji TV		
1978–80	Monkey	Tripitaka	NTV		
1979	Kaze no Hayato		NHK		
1980	Nijiko no Bouken (Adventures of Nijiko)	Nijiko	TV Asahi	Lead role	
1980	The Shousha		NHK		
1981	Downtown monogatari		NTV		
1981	Nonomurabyouin Monogatari	Noriko Kitami	TBS		
1981	Onna Taikōki	Oichi	NHK	Taiga drama	
1982	Bakumatsu Seishun Graffiti: Sakamoto Ryōma	Oryō	NTV		
1983	Dokkiri Tenma-sensei 2		Fuji TV		
1983	Tokugawa Ieyasu	Yodo-dono	NHK	Taiga drama	

== Awards ==
Year	Award	Category	Work(s)	Result
1981	4th Japan Academy Prize	Best Supporting Actress	Port Arthur	Nominated
1982	6th Elan d'or Awards	Newcomer of the Year	Herself	Won
1983	4th Yokohama Film Festival	Best Supporting Actress	Dai Nippon Teikoku	Won
1983	25th Blue Ribbon Awards	Best Actress	Onimasa	Won
1983	8th Hochi Film Award	Best Actress	The Catch and Time and Tide	Won
1984	7th Japan Academy Prize	Best Actress	The Catch and Time and Tide	Nominated
1985	8th Japan Academy Prize	Best Actress	MacArthur's Children	Nominated

== Notes ==
Both of Masako's brothers, Kazuo and Toshiaki Odate are professional golfers. Toshiaki won the 1993 Woodone Open and the 2001 JCB Classic. Masako's sister-in-law, Yoshiko Odate, an actress and former member of the popular 1970s pop group Candies died on April 21, 2011, of breast cancer. Her niece is an actress in the all-female theater company Takarazuka Revue under the stage name Yuno Kazama.

Mawaru-Penguindrum, a 2011 Japanese anime series produced by Brain's Base has a character named Masako Natsume.
