= Atsuhime (TV series) =

2008 taiga drama about Tenshō-in

- Genre: Historical, Jidaigeki
- Based on: Tenshō-in Atsuhime (天璋院篤姫) by Miyao Tomiko
- Written by: Kumiko Tabuchi
- Directed by: Motohiko Sano
- Starring: Aoi Miyazaki; Eita; Masato Sakai; Yukiyoshi Ozawa; Taizo Harada; Maki Horikita; Shota Matsuda; Kyōzō Nagatsuka; Kanako Higuchi; Yoshinori Okada; Hiroshi Tamaki; Sumie Sasaki; Ikki Sawamura; Aiko Satō; Rie Tomosaka; Yumi Iwai; Takehiro Hira; Shunpūtei Koasa; Atsuko Takahata; Masao Kusakari; Tsurutaro Kataoka; Nakamura Baijaku II; Yūichirō Yamaguchi; Hiroyuki Nagato; Izumi Inamori; Meiko Nakamura; Tōru Emori; Keiko Matsuzaka; Mikijirō Hira; Hideki Takahashi; Kin'ya Kitaōji
- Narrated by: Naraoka Tomoko
- Theme music composer: Yoshimata Ryō
- Opening theme: "Atsuhime (Main Theme)" (「篤姫（メインテーマ）」)
- Country of origin: Japan
- Original language: Japanese
- No. of episodes: 50

Production
- Producer: Motohiko Sano
- Production location: Japan
- Running time: 45 minutes

Original release
- Network: NHK
- Release: January 6 – December 14, 2008

Atsuhime (篤姫; "Princess Atsu") is a 2008 Japanese historical drama television series. It is the 47th NHK taiga drama. It aired from January 6 to December 14, 2008, and ran a total of 50 episodes. The drama chronicles the life of Tenshō-in, based on Tomiko Miyao's 1984 novel Tenshō-in Atsuhime (天璋院篤姫). Viewership for Atsuhime was high; the series received an average rating of 24.5%, the highest rating received by a taiga drama since Hideyoshi in 1996.

== Background ==
The taiga drama is based on Tomiko Miyao's novel Tenshō-in Atsuhime. The protagonist is Tenshō-in (Princess Atsu), the wife of Tokugawa Iesada, the thirteenth shōgun of the Edo shogunate. It is the seventh taiga drama to feature a female lead, coming just two years after Kōmyō ga Tsuji in 2006.

Following Yoshitsune in 2005, this is Miyao's second work to be turned into a taiga drama. Following Shinsengumi!, it is also the second taiga drama taking place at the end of the Edo shogunate.

The character of Tenshō-in was previously taken up in the 2003 Fuji Television series Ōoku (starring Kanno Miho).

The lead role is performed by Aoi Miyazaki, for which it is her first Taiga drama lead. She is also the youngest to play the lead role. In May 2008, she won a Galaxy Award for her work in this role.

The first half of the story predominantly takes place in Kagoshima prefecture, and as such many of the actors and music coordinators are from Kagoshima.

== Cast ==
- Okatsu – Atsuhime – Tenshōin: Honoka Nagai – Chinami Iwamoto – Aoi Miyazaki

=== Shimazu clan ===
- Hideki Takahashi as Shimazu Nariakira
- Yūichirō Yamaguchi as Shimazu Tadayuki/ Shimazu Hisamitsu
- Hiroyuki Nagato as Shimazu Narioki
- Mayo Suzukaze as Oyura (Narioki's concubine, mother of Hisamitsu)
- Kimiko Yo as Hisahime
- Nakagawa Shingo as Shimazu Tadayoshi (2nd)
- Yuriko Yoshitaka as Otetsu
- Masaki Kaji as Shimazu Ukon
- Kondo Takatada as Shimazu Hironosuke
- Motokawa Ransho as Shimazu Tokunosuke
- Aka Marino as Osada
- Ebisu Reina as Ohiro
- Watanabe Takuto as Shimazu Torajumaru (Chujiro)
- Iida Shion as Teruhime

=== Imaizumi Shimazu family ===
- Kyōzō Nagatsuka as Shimazu Tadatake
- Kanako Higuchi as Oyuki
- Yoshinori Okada as Shimazu Tadayuki
  - Sakai Kazuhisa as Tadayuki (child)
- Sumie Sasaki as Kikumoto
- Yasukiyo Umeno as Kurikawa Mochitsune
- Yūsuke Shōji as Takuma Harumichi
- Tanahashi Chiyo as Mine
- Kobayashi Asako as Shino
- Kono Yasuro as Shimazu Tadafuyu
  - Fujisaki Go as Tadafuyu (child)

=== Shōgun's clan ===
- Masato Sakai as Tokugawa Iesachi/ Tokugawa Iesada, the 13th shōgun
- Shōta Matsuda as Tokugawa Yoshitomi/ Tokugawa Iemochi, the 14th shōgun
- Takehiro Hira as Hitotsubashi Yoshinobu/ Tokugawa Yoshinobu, the last shōgun
- Shigeru Saiki as Tokugawa Ieyoshi, the 12th shōgun
- Reo Yoshitake as Tayasu Kamenosuke/ Tokugawa Iesato
  - Kisaichi Yuta as Iesato (young)
    - Kobayashi Kaito as Kamenosuke (child)

=== Daimyōs ===
- Tōru Emori as Tokugawa Nariaki
- Kenichi Yajima as Matsudaira Yoshinaga

=== Elite members of Shimazu clan ===
- Eita as Kimotsuki Naogorō / Komatsu Tatewaki
- Mikijirō Hira as Zusho Hirosato
- Ikki Sawamura as Komatsu Kiyomichi
- Rie Tomosaka as Ochika
- Natsuki Harada as Okoto, Komatsu Tatewaki's concubine
- Takaaki Enoki as Kimotsuki Kaneyoshi
- Takahashi Taira as Komatsu Kiyonao
  - Nakamura Shunga as Yasuchiyo (Kiyonao as Child)
- Nakayama Katsumi as Shimazu Bungo
  - Asanuma Shinpei as Shimazu Bungo
- Tengenji Ryu as Shimazu Shosho
- Ito Hiromu as Komatsu Kiyoatsu
- Minami Kazue as Masa
- Misawa Akemi as Kinu
- Nagasawa Dari as Shimazu Hoki
- Okamoto Kotaro as Kawakami Chikugo
- Ryuji Yamamoto as Tateyama Buhee
- Sakabe Fumiaki as Shimazu Hisakaze
- Honda Kiyozumi as Niro Hisanori
- Uehara Kensuke as Tanimura Masatake

=== Low members of Shimazu clan ===
- Yukiyoshi Ozawa as Saigō Kichinosuke / Saigō Takamori
- Taizo Harada as Ōkubo Shōsuke / Ōkubo Toshimichi
- Koji Matoba as Arima Shinshichi
- Kyoko Maya as Fuku
- Shinya Owada as Okubo Toshiya
- Hiroki Miyake as Izachi Masaharu
- Hiroyuki Hirayama as Arima Shunsai
- Momosuke Mizutani as Saigo Judo
- Mitsutoshi Shundo as Oyama Tsunayoshi
- Koukichi Tanoue as Arimura Yusuke
- Yuya Endo as Arimura Jizaemon
- Kenji Takechi as Narahara Kihachiro

=== Ōoku 大奥 ===
- Keiko Matsuzaka as Ikushima 幾島, the tutor of Atsuhime
- Izumi Inamori as Takiyama 瀧山
- Atsuko Takahata as Honjuin
- Tomoko Nakajima as Shigeno
- Yumiko Takahashi as Karahashi
- Yumi Iwai as Utahashi
- Mayu Tsuruta as Oshiga

=== Ladies-in-waiting ===
- Yuka Itaya as Hirokawa
- Aiko Sato as Onoshima
- Tokie Hidari as Takayama
- Sawako Kitahara as Fujino
- Miho Matsuda as Yuki
- Yoshimi Oishi as Hisa

=== Shōgun's advisors ===
- Masao Kusakari as Abe Masahiro
- Takurō Tatsumi as Hotta Masayoshi
- Nakamura Baijaku II as Ii Naosuke
- Akira Shirai as Andō Nobumasa
- Kazuyuki Matsuzawa as Matsudaira Tadakata
- Seishirō Nishida as Itakura Katsukiyo
- Tōgo Shimura as Matsudaira Katamori

=== Shogunate retainers ===
- Kinya Kitaōji as Katsu Kaishū
- Ryō Katsuji as John Manjiro

=== Imperial family ===
- Hideki Tōgi as Emperor Kōmei
- Terunosuke Takezai as Prince Arisugawa Taruhito
- Maki Horikita as Kazunomiya Chikako
- Mayumi Wakamura as Kangyōin

=== Kugyōs ===
- Shumpūtei Koasa as Konoe Tadahiro
- Tsurutarō Kataoka as Iwakura Tomomi

=== Others ===
- Hiroshi Tamaki as Sakamoto Ryōma
- Jumpei Suzuki as Katsura Kogorō

== Production ==
Production Credits

- Original – Tomiko Miyao (Tenshō-in Atsuhime, Kōdansha, 1984)

The author of the original story, Tomiko Miyao, was born in Kōchi. She received the New Female Writer Award (女流新人賞) in 1962 with her work Ren. In 1973, she received the Dazai Osamu Award with “Kai”. In 1979, her work Ichigen no koto won the renowned Naoki Prize. The novel Tenshōin Atsuhime depicts the life of Atsuhime, who had been lost in the flow of history, and was discovered through Miyao's own research. The work Tenshōin Atsuhime is considered to be monumental among her works. This is the second time for NHK to create a taiga drama series after Yoshitsune in 2005.

- Script – Kumiko Tabuchi

Kumiko Tabuchi was born in Shimane Prefecture. She has produced scripts for Sakura, Tsuma no Sotsugyōshiki, and Diamond no Koi, among others. She is known for vividly illustrating women who positively face their lives. She offers scripts in a wide range of areas such as films, musicals, rakugo, play, and kyōgen. This is her first script for Taiga drama.

- Music – Ryō Yoshimata

In the process of creating the music for this drama, Yoshimata went back after 30 years to his hometown Kagoshima and stayed there for three weeks. While meeting his old friends and watching Sakurajima, he was touched by the warmness, toughness, and generosity of the homeland. His deep feelings for his homeland became the basis of the 47 songs created for this drama.

- Titling – Kinko Kikuchi
- Historical research – Manabu Ōishi
- Narrator – Tomoko Naraoka
- Production coordinator – Motohiko Sano
- Casting – Mineyo Satō

The usual procedure of a taiga drama production would have one-third of the expected number of scripts finished before shooting begins. Afterwards, audience reception is taken into account as the rest of the series is written.

One of the sources used for an accurate portrayal of Atsuhime and life in the Ōoku was the Kyūji Shimonroku (旧事諮問錄), a series of interviews with bakufu officials in the late-19th century.

== Plot ==
The episodes largely fall into two parts. The first half of the series revolves around Atsuhime's life in Satsuma. The latter half mainly proceeds with the politics around the Tokugawa Shogunate after she moved to Edo to marry Tokugawa Iesada.

=== Episode 1: Child of Destiny (1/6/2008) ===
The episode starts off in Satsuma in 1835, 20 years prior to the arrival of the Black Ships led by Matthew C. Perry. People in Satsuma are excited by the arrival of the heir to the domain, Shimazu Nariakira, from Edo. Meanwhile, a long-awaited daughter is born in one of the cadet families of Shimazu clan, the Imaizumi Shimazu family. The father of the girl, Shimazu Tadatake, and the mother, Oyuki, name her "Katsu", wishing the child's happiness. Okatsu grew up as a tomboy, much stronger than her brothers, yet is warm-hearted and full of curiosity.

Before long, the Satsuma Domain picks up its efforts at strict financial reform under the guidance of Karō Zusho Hirosato. Saigō Kichinosuke (Saigō Takamori), witnessing the farmers' harsh life, appeals to Tadatake. Hirosato receives this news and punishes Tadatake for allowing farmers to express their dissent, for it suggests lenient treatment of farmers on Tadatake's part. Okatsu, unable to comprehend Hirosato's action of punishing those who support farmers, recklessly decides to charge over to Hirosato's house with her close friend Kimotsuke Naogorō (Komatsu Tatewaki) to demand a reason.

=== Episode 2: Vow at Sakurajima (1/13/2008) ===
By restraining himself and devoting his effort to the domain's financial reform, Tadatake manages to avoid punishment. With Karō Zusho Hirosato's reform steadily gaining results, the domain's debt, which at one point reached 5 million Ryō (Japanese coin), is cleared. Meanwhile, the lives of farmers and samurai become extremely difficult, and their plight fuels animosity among young samurai like Saigō Kichnosuke and Ōkubo Shōsuke (Ōkubo Toshimichi) toward Daimyō Shimazu Narioki, who employed Zusho and his concubine, Oyura. Amid hostilities, Shimazu Nariakira's children have died one after another. What is more, a doll, supposedly used for a curse, is found under the room of these children. The hatred toward Oyura and Zusho peaks within the domain. With this as a backdrop, Okatsu is invited by Zusho to his house. She visits him with Kimotsuki Naogorō. In his house, Zusho tells Okatsu that he wants to share ideas with her before he goes off to Edo. Subsequently, Zusho goes to Edo but is suspected by Rōjū Abe Masahiro of illegal trade. To protect Satsuma from repercussions, he kills himself by taking poison.

=== Episode 3: Satsuma Divide (1/20/2008) ===
In Satsuma, Oyura—Narioki's concubine—is trying to make her son heir to the clan and antagonizing the group that stood by Nariakira. Okatsu is curious about the domain's politics, but Tadatake chides her that politics is not something children should be involved in. In connection with the family quarrel, Ōkubo Tadasuke (Toshimichi) is punished by the domain. Okatsu, who heard the news from Naogorō, worries about Tadasuke's family and starts to bring in food to the family from her home. Tadasuke is deeply moved by the kindness of Okatsu, Naogorō, and Saigō. Having seen Tadasuke's sisters busy with their side jobs, Okatsu tries to give her expensive comb and hair ornament to Tadasuke's mother, Fuku. Fuku, however, flatly refuses to accept them. To Okatsu, who is worried if her kindness hurt Fuku, Oyuki explains about the pride of women in Satsuma. Meanwhile, Nariakira, who succeeded as the head of the clan with the help of rōjū Abe, enters Satsuma with huge ambitions.

=== Episode 4: A Wise Lord Angered (1/27/2008) ===
In the wake of the family quarrel, the new clan head Nariakira arrives at Satsuma from Edo and takes the lead in the reform of rice prices. The group who sided with Tadayuki (Shimazu Hisamitsu) fears how Nariakira is going to punish its members, but he does not punish anybody. Saigō and other young samurai become frustrated because Ōkubo, who should have been pardoned right away, has not received clemency. Okatsu and Naogorō go over to Komatsu Kiyomichi and Ochika's place and ask about Nariakira's true intention. Kiyomichi, however, says that faith in Nariakira is the only way of loyalty, but this does not convince Okatsu. Meanwhile, Nariakira invites the Imaizumi family to the castle to meet members of branch families. Tadatake subjects Okatsu to practice in a ladylike manner to avoid embarrassment in the meeting. On the day of Okatsu's visit, Okatsu intensely presses Nariakira on why Ōkubo has not been pardoned. Nariakira, who has a different purpose for the meeting, is amused by Okatsu's honest yet serious attitude and comes to have an interest in her.

=== Episode 5: The Best Man in Japan (2/3/2008) ===
Japanese history books have been sent to Okatsu's place from Nariakira. Kikumoto tells Okatsu, who were overjoyed and busily reading the books, that the happiness of women lies in marriage. Meanwhile, Shimazu Tadayuki comes with news to Tadatake that his son fell in love at first sight with Okatsu and that he wants to marry her. Fearing the risk that Nariakira might misunderstand the connection between his family and Tadayuki's family, Tadatake, however, could not view the marriage proposal in a positive light.

Naogorō, who heard the story from Tadayuki, is gravely shaken. He asks Okatsu her thoughts on marriage, but she only tells him that she wishes to marry the best man in Japan. In the meantime, John Manjirō, who has just returned from the US, is invited to Satsuma. Naogorō meets him and is inspired by his story that marriage in the US is based on the agreement between the individuals, unlike in Japan, where it is decided by the two families. This gives him courage to openly tell Tadatake about his feelings for Okatsu. But the next day finds Tadatake called up to the castle. Against his fear that the proposal news might have reached Nariakira, he is informed of Nariakira's plan for adopting Okatsu.

=== Episode 6: Women’s Path (2/10/2008) ===
Nariakira's plan to adopt Okatsu has stirred Tadatake. Kikumoto, who had raised her since she was little, is overjoyed by this honor. Taken by surprised, Okatsu, however, is hesitant, not knowing what to do. It is only certain that she could not turn down the offer. Naogorō, who has learned the news, grows desperate, for it would be impossible to marry Okatsu once she is adopted. Emotionally charged, he starts to cry at Saigō's home, but Saigō's compassion cheers him up.

In the overjoyed Imaizumi family, Oyuki detects strangeness in Kikumoto's behavior. Okatsu, in the meantime, implores Tadatake for permission to have an audience with Nariakira to plead for explanations. On the morning of Okatsu's visit to the castle, Kikumoto presses on Okatsu saying “A woman’s life is like walking on a long one-way path. It is a dishonor to turn back the path."

In response to Okatsu's straightforward question, Nariakira explains that he wants to adopt her because she reminds him of his mother. Having learned his brimming affection for her, Okatsu finally comes to a decision to become his daughter. When she returns home, however, there is news waiting that Kikumoto has killed herself.

=== Episode 7: The Father's Tears (2/17/2008) ===
Okatsu is gravely shaken from Kikumoto's taking her own life. What is more, she starts to hold ill feelings for her father, for he got rid of Kikumoto's body as if treating criminals. That night, Okatsu learns from Oyuki that Kikumoto left a will. In it, she wrote that her choice to kill herself was motivated by her wish to erase the blemish that someone of a low status like herself raised Okatsu, who is now facing a bright future. Okatsu realized Kikumoto's considerations and expectations for her future and learned the true meaning of becoming Nariakira's daughter.

Meanwhile, news from Nagasaki Dejima comes into Edo that an American naval fleet demanding trade with Japan is approaching. Leaders in the Tokugawa shogunate face difficulty in how it should be dealt. Nariaki supports the sweeping expulsion of foreigners from Japan and does not yield. Facing this, Nariakira comes to a realization the urgency of adopting Okatsu to implement his political scheme in this political turmoil.

While the day Okatsu moves to Tsurumaru Castle closes in, Tadatake all of a sudden started to devote himself to constructing batteries for guarding the coastlines, behaving as if he has no interest in the adoption affair. Finally, the day for Okatsu to leave for the castle arrives.

=== Episode 8: How to be a Princess (2/24/2008) ===
Okatsu moves into Tsurumaru Castle, but has a hard time fitting into its restrictive customs. She is belittled by Hirokawa and other women serving under her as a girl from a branch family and starts to take a negligent attitude.

Okubo Shōsuke is released from the house arrest of three years, and this makes Naogorō and Saigō feel relieved. Okatsu wants to share the joy but feels lonely when she finds herself at a high, distant social rank which prohibits them to even exchange words with her.

=== Episode 36: Satsuma or Tokugawa (9/7/2008) ===
While the Edo group and the Kyōto group inside the Ōoku continue to antagonize to each other, little by little Kazunomiya and Iemochi became closer. Tensho-in was finally feeling relieved.

Then, commanding a force of a few thousand soldiers, Hisamitsu left for Kyōto with the intention of receiving the Emperor's approval for reforming the Tokugawa Shōgunate. Meanwhile, suspicion that Tenshō-in might be involved in the plot mounted in Edo.

The message that the Satsuma force headed to Edo reached Ōoku, and distrust directed to Tenshō-in further deepened. Amid this, even Iemochi, who had been on Tenshō-in's side, came to suspect her. Crushed from everyone's distrust, Tenshō-in started to burn her personal items that she brought with her from Satsuma. Seeing this, Iemochi realized how much she is hurt by his distrust and apologized to her that he would not doubt her from now on.

=== Episode 37: Parting of Friendship (9/14/2008) ===
The Satsuma force led by Hisamitsu entered Edo accompanying an Imperial envoy. His aim was to reform the Tokugawa Shogunate. Meanwhile, Tenshō-in was anxious if Tatewaki also came to Edo accompanying Hisamitsu. Against Hisamitsu's wish, the negotiation between the envoy and Rōjū came to a dead end. Hisamitsu became extremely impatient and ordered Ōkubo to threaten the Rōjū side by force. While Tatewaki felt awkward toward such a forceful approach taken by his comrades, Satsuma succeeded in pressing on the reform plan. Tenshō-in, who was upset at Satsuma's cowardly move, sought an audience with Hisamitsu to ascertain his true intentions. With her unsuccessful meeting with Hisamitsu, she failed to exchange words with Tatewaki, who was in the company of Hisamitsu. Regretting this sour reunion with Tatewaki, Tenshō-in asked Iemochi to invite Tatewaki to Ōoku. Playing igo like when they were still in Satsuma, Tenshō-in and Tatewaki engaged in friendly conversation and promised to each other that each would try their best to defend their own people: the Tokugawa clan for Tenshō-in and the people of Satsuma for Tatewaki.

=== Episode 38: Heart of the Mother-In-Law, Heart of the Wife (9/21/2008) ===
A letter from Tatewaki recounting what really took place in Namamugi Incident reached Tenshō-in. Having learned the truth, she maintained that the Shogunate, together with Satsuma, needed to apologize to Britain. Meanwhile, in Kyoto, the Chōshū group came to dominate the political scene, defeating the Satsuma group and its leaders Shimazu Hisamitsu and Iwakura Tomomi.

Amid this confusion, an Imperial Envoy came from Kyoto to Edo, demanding Iemochi to visit the capital and to implement a policy that would exclude foreigners. Upon discussing the matter with Tenshō-in, he made up his mind to tell the emperor in person that the implementation of such a policy would be unattainable. Princess Kazu, however, strongly opposed Iemochi's decision.

Sakamoto Ryōma visited Katsu Rintarō. Although he initially intended to kill Lintarō, after discussion, he changed his mind and asked Lintarō to become his mentor. In the meantime in Satsuma, Tatewaki got promoted to the position of Karō.

In Edo castle, where Iemochi's departure was looming close, Tenshō-in and Lintaro argued with each other whether Iemochi should take a land route or a sea route. Meanwhile, Kazunomiya, who learned that Tenshō-in pushed Iemochi to visit the capital, came to harbor strong hostility toward Tenshō-in.

=== Episode 39: Buring Satsuma (9/28/2008) ===
The news that Shōgun Iemochi arrived at Kyoto came to Ōoku and lightened her mind. Kazunomiya, on the other hand, worried about Iemochi and became more restless. Her fear became true when radicals led by a Chōshū Domain group supporting the expulsion of foreigners dominated the Imperial Court in Kyoto. Mired in the quandary, Iemochi was forced to promise to the court the enforcement of expelling foreigners.

Tenshōin, who blamed herself for urging Iemochi's visit to Kyoto, asked Kazunomiya to convince his brother, Emperor Kōmei to arrange Iemochi's return to Edo, but Kazunomiya adamantly refused it. Tenshōin sent Katsu Kaishū to Iemochi, who fell ill from the exhaustion from the trip to Kyōto. Through the conversation with Katsu, Iemochi regained his spirits and learned his board perspective on the matter.

In the meantime, Chōshū Domain carried out the expulsion of foreigners, and word reached Satsuma. Hisamitsu and Tatewaki realized that war was imminent.

In Kyōto, Iemochi was permitted to return to Edo with Kazunomiya's plea to the emperor. Tenshōin expressed her gratitude to Kazunomiya. Then, the news came in that the British Royal Navy staying in Yokohama headed to Satsuma. The Anglo-Satsuma War was about to start.

=== Episode 40: Son Taking the Field (10/05/08) ===
Saigō, who had been exiled, came back. At the gathering where Saigō and his old friends reunited, Tatewaki met a geisho, Okoto. The Chōshū domain, which is bent on regaining its political leverage in the capital, suddenly attacked the Imperial Palace. This is known as the Kinmon Incident. Tatewaki, who led the Satsuma forces, joined forces with the Shōgunate, along with Yoshinobu, and defeat the enemy forces. In the meantime, in Ōoku, Takiyama advised Tenshōin to let the shōgun have a concubine who could bear his heir, for she was purely concerned with the future of the Tokugawa clan and desired to consolidate the foundations of the Shugunate's rule. Tenshōin, however, did not want to tear up the intimate relationship between Kazunomiya and Iemochi and flatly rejected the idea.

The Naval School established by Katsu Kaishū was about to be shut down by the shōgunate, suffering the repercussions of the Kinmon Incident. Katsu sent his disciple Sakamoto Ryōma to Tatewaki, who was the karo of the Satsuma domain, to ask him to take care of the students. Meanwhile, in Edo Castle, Kazunomiya showed signs of pregnancy, and the entire Ōoku was delighted with the news. Kangyōin—Kazunomiya's mother—and Tenshōin both shared the excitement of expecting a grandchild. As it turned out, however, Kazunomiya's pregnancy proved false.

== Atsuhime Travel Sketches (篤姫紀行) ==
Atsuhime Travel Sketches is a series of sketches that is assigned to the last few minutes of each episode. In each sketch, a few historical sites relevant to the drama are introduced with a short video clip and brief comment.

=== Sketch 1: Atsuhime’s Homeland ===
- The Imaizumi Shimazu Family Residence Historical Site (今和泉島津家別邸跡) <Kagoshima City>

Kagoshima City, Kagoshima Prefecture, is the hometown of Atsuhime. It was a castle town of the 770, 000 koku Satsuma Domain. In 1835, Okatsu (later Atsuhime) was born in one of the Shimazu branch families, the Imaizumi Shimazu family, as the eldest daughter. Her birthhouse was located in the area close to Kagoshima Castle, where upper-class samurai lived.
Ibusuki, Kagoshima is located 40 km south of Kagoshima City. The northern section of the city was the Imaizumi Shimazu family’s territory. In the Imaizumi family’s residence site still remains a chōzubachi that is known to have been used by Atsuhime.
Direction to the Imaizumi family’s residence site: JR Satsuma-Imaizumi Station

=== Sketch 2: Naogorō’s Homeland ===
- Komatsu Tatewaki Statue <Kagoshima City>

Kagoshima City, Kagoshima Prefecture is the hometown of Kimotsuki Naogorō (later Komatsu Tatewaki). Naogorō was born in 1835, the same year as Atsuhime was born. He was the third son of Kimotsuki Kaneyoshi and grew up close to the birthhouse of Atsuhime.
At the age of 23, Naogorō was adopted by the Komatsu family and afterwards became politically influential in the tumultuous period prior to the Meiji Restoration as karō of the Satsuma Domain.

=== Sketch 3: The Strongest Samuraihood ===
Izumi, Kagoshima, is the birthplace of the Shimazu clan. The first head of the clan, Shimazu Tadahisa, established the castle in the Kamakura period and built the clan’s foundation. In Kannōji Temple, the first five heads of the clan are resting peacefully. During that time, travelers and shipments passing through Izumi were strictly searched, for the location was on the border between Satsuma and Higo. On the foot of the hills still remain numerous residences of samurai.

=== Sketch 4: Nariakira’s Achievements ===
Shimazu Nariakira established the first modern factories at a location called Iso 5 km northeast of central Kagoshima city. With the incorporation of western technology, great efforts were made at the development of ironworks and shipbuilding, along with the foundation of the glass handcraft industry and the cotton mill industry. In Senganen, Shimzau’s villa, Nariakira succeeded in lighting a gas lamp. He was enshrined in Terukuni Shrine (照国神社, Terukuni jinja) and is still known by many.

=== Sketch 5: Manjirō’s Homeland ===
Nakahama (Tosashimizu, Kōchi), located on the eastside of Ashizuri Peninsula, is the homeland of Nakahama Manjirō. Manjirō, who lost his father when he was young, started working early to make ends meet. It was at the age of 14, when he was cast away during his fishing trip. He was saved by an American whaling ship and spent 10 years in the foreign land of America. The knowledge that Manjirō brought from abroad gave a significant impact on later developments in Japan.

=== Sketch 6: Satsuma’s Gojū Education (郷中教育) ===
Kajiya Town, located on Kōtsuki River in Kagoshima, produced many leaders of the new Meiji government such as Saigō Takamori and Ōkubo Toshimichi. The Satsuma Domain had a unique educational system named Gojū Education (郷中教育). The territory was divided roughly into 30 areas, and within each area the senior educated the junior. Saigō and Ōkubo were also educated by teachings of their seniors.

=== Sketch 7: The Port Town Deeply Connected to Atsuhime ===
Ibusuki, Kagoshima is renowned for sunamushi hot spring (砂蒸し温泉), a hot spring that requires the body to be covered with hot, steamy sand. The town has a good natural port and was busy in trade with China and Ryūkyū in the past. As a consequence, however, the town was exposed to the threat of foreign ships many times. Lord Nariakira reinforced battery fortifications around the area to strengthen its defense.

=== Sketch 8: The Arrival of the Black Ships ===
During the Edo period, Uraga was an entrance for many ships which visited the country. Back then, the port was lined with ship merchants. Many Inari shrines built for business success still remain in the city. In 1853, four black ships commanded by Commodore Matthew C. Perry appeared in Uraga Bay. Seeking the opening of Japan, he lands on Kuri Beach. The arrival of the Black Ships heralded the beginning of the turmoil leading up to the Meiji Restoration and also radically changed the fate of Atsuhime.

=== Sketch 9: The Castle where Atsuhime was Born ===
Kagoshima Castle is called "Crane Castle" and has been cherished by many, for it is formed in a shape that appears like a crane spreading its wings. The front side has the main gate called Gorō Gate. Passing through the gate, a modestly constructed main palace used to welcomed visitors. It's been said that one corner of the building was assigned to Ōoku. The stone foundations still contain traces of bullets from the Satsuma Rebellion. In the castle that witnessed the tumultuous period of Japan, Okatsu took the name Atsuhime.

=== Sketch 10: Achievements of Tokugawa Nariaki ===
Mito flourished during the Edo period as the castle town of the Mito Han, one of the Tokugawa Gosanke. The 9th daimyō of the domain, Tokugawa Nariaki aggressively carried out reform. He also encouraged both literary and military arts and established the school Kōdōkan and the relaxing place for samurai Kairakuen. Even after the family headship was handed over to his son, he remained on the political scene as a leading figure of the Jōi (攘夷) group, which supported the expulsion of foreigners from Japan.

=== Sketch 11: The Town with a Flagrance of Antiquity ===
Located at the southeast of Satsuma Peninsula, in current Minamisatsuma, Kagoshima, Bōnotsu Town had been known, inside and outside of the country, as a sea entrance to Japan. It is said that Ganjin, a renowned Buddhist monk, arrived here in 753f from China and passed on knowledge about incense. There is a historical record recounting that merchants of Bōnotsu brought in the incense called Jinkō (沈香) from Agarwood to the Shimazu clan.
It has been said that the activity to burn incense for entertainment caught on and expanded to the four corners of the country during the Edo period.

=== Sketch 12: My Homeland, Sakurajima ===
Sakurajima is one of the most active volcanoes in the world. In particular, the eruption in 1914 caused enormous damage to the region. Due to thermal effects created in the volcanic area, public bathhouses in Kagoshima, Kagoshima use hot spring water. At the foothills of Sakurajima grow local produce such as Sakurajima Daikon and Sakurajima Small Mikan. The volcano that Atsuhime adored is the homeland for people of Kagoshima across time.

=== Sketch 13: Atsuhime’s Journey to Edo ===
In the fall of 1853, Atsuhime dropped by Kyoto on the way to Edo. During her stay, she met with Konoe Tadahiro. Konoe, a Kuge, had a strong tie with Satsuma, since he married Nariakira’s elder sister as his primary wife. Tōfuku-ji Sokusōin, where Atsuhime visited for worshiping, was the temple where the Shimazu clan worshiped their ancestors tracing back to the Muromachi period. After spending roughly one week, she left for Edo with full of expectations and worries.

=== Sketch 14: Ii Naosuke's Homeland ===
- Hikone, Shiga

Ii Naosuke, who later played a significant role as a Tairō in the late Edo period, was born in 1815 as a son of the head of the Hikone domain. Although he was the 14th boy, coupled with his brothers’ untimely deaths, he was surprisingly chosen to head the domain at the age of 36. It was the Hikone domain that was guarding Uraga Bay when Commodore Perry came to demand Japan’s opening. Ii, who recognized the immense military power of the US, asserted the importance of opening the country. Afterwards, he antagonized with Tokugawa Nariaki over foreign policy.

=== Sketch 15: The Temple Remembered in Connection with Saigō Takamori ===
- Meguro Fudōson Ryūsen-ji (目黒不動尊瀧泉寺) <Meguro, Tokyo>

Ryūsenji, also known as Meguro Fudōson, is a temple that is closely connected to Saigō Takamori. According to the temple’s historical recount, it was established in the Heian period and was bustled with visitors during the Edo period. In 1854, the Satsuma domain met with an unfortunate turn of events, Nariakira's illness and his fifth son’s sudden death. Saigō wrote in a letter to his friend that he paid homage at the temple for Nariakira’s health. Under Nariakira, who recovered his health, Saigō lived through the tumult years of the late Edo period.

=== Sketch 16: Birth Place of Yoshinobu ===
- The Mito Domain Edo Residence Historical Site (Koishikawa Kōrakuen Garden) <Chiyoda, Tokyo>

Koishikawa Kōrakuen Garden is a place where the Mito Tokugawa family had their Edo residence up till the beginning of the Meiji period. In 1938, one boy was born in this residence, later known as 15th Tokugawa Shogun Yoshinobu. He was a smart boy, and it caught Tokugawa Ieyoshi's eyes and was adopted to the Hitotsubashi Tokugawa House, one of the Gosankyō. Yoshinobu, whom even Nariakira was pushing for the next Shogun, was later going to run into Atsuhime.

=== Sketch 17: The Satsuma Domain Residence in Edo ===
- The Satsuma Domain Residence Historic Site <Shibuya, Tokyo and Minato, Tokyo>

It has been said that central Edo has five residences of the Satsuma Domain during the final years of the Edo period. The place located in current Shiba in Minato-ward was the center of the domain's activity. Atsuhime also stayed here for close to two years. In the aftermath of the Ansei great earthquakes, however, the residence was destroyed, and Atsuhime was relocated to a residence in Shibuya. The following year, she moved to Edo castle to marry the shogun.

=== Sketch 18: The Port Town where Harris Stayed ===
- Gyokusen-ji (玉泉寺) <Shimoda, Shizuoka>

Townsend Harris visited Shimoda as the first Consul General of the US to secure trade between Japan and the US in 1856, three years after Commodore Perry's arrival to the country. He opened the first U.S. Consulate at Gyokusen-ji, which is located close to the port and worked on negotiating the "Treaty of Peace and Commerce,” or the Harris Treaty, signed in 1858. Having stayed in Shimoda for nearly three years, Harris left his traces, the “Harris path,” where he used to take a walk, and a stone tablet that commemorates his stay.

=== Sketch 19: The Castle where Atsuhime Stayed ===
- Kōkyo Higashigoen and Ōtemon <Chiyoda, Tokyo>

Kōkyo Higashigoen was the location where the donjon of Edo castle was located. It’s been said that the guard of the castle was tight with the main entrance, Ōtemon, and other three gates leading to the donjon. Ōoku, where Atsuhime was staying, was located within this donjon whose area covered 40,000 tsubo. Atsuhime faced the tumultuous end of the Tokugawa shogunate in this castle.

=== Sketch 40: Hamaguri Gate ===
- The Hamaguri Gate (蛤御門) <Kyoto City>

On July 19th, 1864, the Chōshū domain attacked the Kyoto Imperial Palace. Later, this rebellion later became known as the Jinmon Incident. The Shogunate force guarding the palace was, at one point, overwhelmed by the Chōshū forces. The Satsuma forces led by Saigō Takamori came for reinforcement and turned the tables.
It was said that Komatsu Tatewaki, who attacked Tenryū-ji, where the Chōshū forces’ headquarters was located, distributed to commoners who suffered from fires from the war the rice that was left in the temple by the enemy forces. In the wake of this battle, Satsuma’s influence in Kyoto became further strengthened.

=== Sketch 41: Satchō Alliance ===
- The Nihonmatsu Satsuma Domain Residence Historic Site <Kyoto, Kyoto>

It has been said that the place where the Satsuma-Chōshū Alliance was formed was this house in Kyoto owned by the Komatsu family. Since the Chōshū Domain, which fought with the Tokugawa shogunate in the Kinmon Incident, was unable to purchase weapons from the western powers, it sought assistance to the Satsuma domain in supplying weapons. Tatewaki's acceptance of this plea led to obtaining the trust of Katsura Kogorō and other Chōshū samurai. In the end, the alliance was formed between the two domains.

== TV schedule ==
Episode	Title	Directed by	Original airdate	Rating
1	"Tenmei no Ko" (天命の子, Child of Destiny)	Mineyo Satō	January 6, 2008	20.3%
2	"Sakurajima no Chikai" (桜島の誓い, Vow at Sakurajima)	Mineyo Satō	January 13, 2008	20.4%
3	"Satsuma Bunretsu" (薩摩分裂, Satsuma Divide)	Takeshi Okada	January 20, 2008	21.4%
4	"Meikun Okoru" (名君怒る, A Wise Lord Angered)	Takeshi Okada	January 27, 2008	22.7%
5	"Nihon-ichi no Otoko" (日本一の男, The Best Man in Japan)	Kentarō Horikirizono	February 3, 2008	24.0%
6	"Onna no Michi" (女の道, Women’s Path)	Kentarō Horikirizono	February 10, 2008	22.7%
7	"Chichi no Namida" (父の涙, The Father's Tears)	Mineyo Satō	February 17, 2008	21.6%
8	"Ohimesama Kyōiku" (お姫様教育, How to be a Princess)	Mineyo Satō	February 24, 2008	22.4%
9	"Atsuhime Tanjō" (篤姫誕生, Atsuhime is Born)	Takeshi Okada	March 2, 2008	25.3%
10	"Midaidokoro eno Kesshin" (御台所への決心, Determined to Become the Shogun's Wife)	Takeshi Okada	March 9, 2008	23.8%
11	"Tanabata no Saikai" (七夕の再会, Reunion on the Tanabata)	Yoshio Watanabe	March 16, 2008	24.7%
12	"Saraba Sakurajima" (さらば桜島, Farewell, Sakurajima)	Yoshio Watanabe	March 23, 2008	23.5%
13	"Edo no Hahagimi" (江戸の母君, The Mother in Edo)	Mineyo Satō	March 30, 2008	21.6%
14	"Chichi no Negai" (父の願い, The Father's Wish)	Mineyo Satō	April 6, 2008	22.3%
15	"Hime, Shutsujin" (姫、出陣, The Princess Goes to Battle)	Takeshi Okada	April 13, 2008	23.7%
16	"Haran no Hanami" (波乱の花見, Cherry Blossoms Amidst Tumult)	Takeshi Okada	April 20, 2008	22.4%
17	"Yoki senu Engumi" (予期せぬ縁組み, An Unexpected Marriage)	Yoshio Watanabe	April 27, 2008	23.1%
18	"Nariakira no Mitsumei" (斉彬の密命, Nariakira's Secret Orders)	Yoshio Watanabe	May 4, 2008	20.9%
19	"Ōoku Nyūjō" (大奥入城, The Wedding Night)	Mineyo Satō	May 11, 2008	24.6%
20	"Konrei no Yoru" (婚礼の夜, The Wedding Night)	Mineyo Satō	May 18, 2008	24.2%
21	"Tsuma no Ikusa" (妻の戦, Battle of the Wives)	Kentarō Horikirizono	May 25, 2008	24.4%
22	"Shōgun no Himitsu" (将軍の秘密, The Shogun's Secret)	Kentarō Horikirizono	June 1, 2008	24.8%
23	"Utsuwa-kurabe" (器くらべ, The Better Man)	Takeshi Okada	June 8, 2008	24.8%
24	"Yurusumaji, Atsuhime" (許すまじ、篤姫, It's Unforgivable, Atsu-hime)	Takeshi Okada	June 15, 2008	25.7%
25	"Haha no Aizō" (母の愛憎, A Mother's Love and Hate)	Yoshio Watanabe	June 22, 2008	22.6%
26	"Arashi no Kenpakusho" (嵐の建白書, A Hell-Raising Petition)	Yoshio Watanabe	June 29, 2008	24.7%
27	"Tokugawa no Tsuma" (徳川の妻, Wife of the Tokugawa)	Kentarō Horikirizono	July 6, 2008	26.0%
28	"Futatsu no Yuigon" (ふたつの遺言, Two Wills)	Kentarō Horikirizono	July 13, 2008	26.2%
29	"Tenshō-in Atsuhime" (天璋院篤姫)	Takeshi Okada	July 20, 2008	24.3%
30	"Shōgun no Haha" (将軍の母, The Shogun's Mother)	Mineyo Satō	July 27, 2008	25.8%
31	"Saraba Ikushima" (さらば幾島, Farewell, Ikushima)	Yoshio Watanabe	August 3, 2008	24.6%
32	"Sakuradamon-gai no Hen" (桜田門外の変, The Incident Outside Sakuradamon Gate)	Kentarō Horikirizono	August 10, 2008	26.4%
33	"Kōjo Kazunomiya" (皇女和宮, Princess Kazu)	Kentarō Horikirizono	August 17, 2008	27.7%
34	"Kuge to Buke" (公家と武家, Imperial Court and Feudal Clan)	Mineyo Satō	August 24, 2008	26.4%
35	"Giwaku no Kaiken" (疑惑の懐剣, Dagger of Doubt)	Tadashi Uesugi	August 31, 2008	23.3%
36	"Satsuma ka Tokugawa ka" (薩摩か徳川か, Satsuma or Tokugawa)	Takeshi Okada	September 7, 2008	27.7%
37	"Yūjō to Ketsubetsu" (友情と決別, Parting of Friendship)	Yoshio Watanabe	September 14, 2008	26.1%
38	"Shūto no Kokoro Yome no Kokoro" (姑の心 嫁の心, Heart of the Mother-In-Law, Heart of the Wife)	Mineyo Satō	September 21, 2008	26.1%
39	"Satsuma Moyu" (薩摩燃ゆ, Buring Satsuma)	Hirotaka Matsukawa	September 28, 2008	24.7%
40	"Musuko no Shutsujin" (息子の出陣, Son Taking the Field)	Takeshi Okada	October 5, 2008	28.1%
41	"Satcho Dōmei" (薩長同盟, Satcho Alliance)	Yoshio Watanabe	October 12, 2008	24.2%
42	"Musuko no Shi" (息子の死, The Death of the Son)	Mineyo Satō	October 19, 2008	26.3%
43	"Yome no Kesshin" (嫁の決心, The Determination of the Wife)	Takeshi Okada	October 26, 2008	24.5%
44	"Ryōma Shisu tomo" (龍馬死すとも, Ryoma Dies)	Yoshio Watanabe	November 2, 2008	23.5%
45	"Haha kara no Fumi" (母からの文, A Letter from Mother)	Yoshio Watanabe	November 9, 2008	22.6%
46	"Yoshinobu Kyūshutsu" (慶喜救出, Yoshinobu Rescued)	Takeshi Okada	November 16, 2008	24.3%
47	"Ōoku no Shisha" (大奥の使者, Ooku's Messenger)	Mineyo Satō	November 23, 2008	25.1%
48	"Muketsu-Kaijō" (無血開城, Bloodless Surrender)	Yoshio Watanabe	November 30, 2008	29.2%
49	"Meiji-zen'ya no Saikai" (明治前夜の再会, Reunion on the Eve of Meiji)	Takeshi Okada	December 7, 2008	27.8%
50	"Ippon no Michi" (一本の道, One Path)	Mineyo Satō	December 14, 2008	28.7%
Average rating 24.5% - Rating is based on Japanese Video Research (Kantō region).

=== Highlight ===
Episode	Title	Original airdate	Original airtime
1	"Midaidokoro eno Kesshin" (御台所への決心, Determined to Become the Shogun's Wife)	December 26, 2008	19:30 - 20:43
2	"Ōoku Nyūjō" (大奥入城, The Wedding Night)	December 27, 2008	19:30 - 20:43
3	"Tenshō-in Atsuhime" (天璋院篤姫)	December 27, 2008	21:00 - 21:58
4	"Tokugawa no Haha" (徳川の母, Mother of the Tokugawa)	December 28, 2008	19:30 - 20:43
5	"Muketsu-Kaijō" (無血開城, Bloodless Surrender)	December 28, 2008	21:00 - 21:58

== Home media ==
The first 27 episodes of the Atsuhime series were released by Geneon Entertainment in a 7-disc DVD box set on December 19, 2008. A second DVD box set for the remaining episodes was later released by the same company (renamed Geneon Universal) on March 25, 2009.

== Soundtrack and books ==
=== Soundtrack ===
- Atsuhime NHK Taiga Drama Original Soundtrack (Release date: February 20, 2008)
- Atsuhime NHK Taiga Drama Original Soundtrack Vol. 2 (Release date: October 29, 2008)
- Best Soundtracks 〜篤姫BEST and More〜 (Release date: August 5, 2009)

=== Books ===
Official guide

- NHK Taiga Drama Story Atsuhime First part ISBN 978-4-14-923347-5 (December 20, 2007)
- NHK Taiga Drama Story Atsuhime Latter part ISBN 978-4-14-923348-2 (June 30, 2008)
- NHK Taiga Drama Story Atsuhime Last part ISBN 978-4-14-923349-9 (October 2008)
- NHK Taiga Drama, Historical handbook, Atsuhime ISBN 978-4-14-910655-7 (December 2007)
- NHK Taiga Drama, Atsuhime Complete Guidebook ISBN 978-4-92456691-0 (December 20, 2007)

== International broadcast ==
It aired in Thailand on TPBS from August 13 to December 4, 2009, with reruns on same channel from January 30 to July 30, 2011.
