= The Catch (1983 film) =

- DVD cover
- Gyoei no Mure (魚影の群れ)
- Directed by: Shinji Sōmai
- Screenplay by: Yōzō Tanaka
- Based on: 魚影の群れ by Akira Yoshimura
- Produced by: Hideshi Miyajima; Kanji Nakagawa; Akira Oda
- Starring: Ken Ogata; Kōichi Satō; Masako Natsume; Tappei Shimokawa
- Cinematography: Mutsuo Naganuma
- Edited by: Sachiko Yamaji
- Music by: Shigeaki Saegusa
- Distributed by: Shochiku
- Release date: October 29, 1983 (Japan)
- Running time: 141 minutes
- Country: Japan
- Language: Japanese

The Catch (Japanese: 魚影の群れ, Hepburn: Gyoei no mure) is a 1983 Japanese film directed by Shinji Sōmai.

== Cast ==
- Ken Ogata as Fusajiro
- Kōichi Satō as Shunichi
- Masako Natsume as Tokiko
- Tappei Shimokawa as Asami
- Shigeru Yazaki as Shinichi
- Minori Terada as Fisherman
- Ryō Kinomoto as Fisherman
- Masato Ise
- Yuhei Ito
- Nodoka Kawai
- Shinji Ishikawa
- Leonard Kuma as Kumagai
- Eiichi Kudo as Bar Owner
- Saburo Ishikura as Kishimoto
- Enraku Sanyutei V as Eisuke
- Yukiyo Toake as Aya

== Awards and nominations ==
26th Blue Ribbon Awards

- Won: Best Actor – Ken Ogata (also won for The Ballad of Narayama, The Geisha and Okinawan Boys)

57th Kinema Junpo Best Ten Awards

- Best Ten List: 7th place
- Readers' Choice Top 10 Japanese Films of the Year: 8th place

7th Japan Academy Awards

- Won: Outstanding Performance by an Actor in a Leading Role – Ken Ogata (also won for The Ballad of Narayama and The Geisha)
- Nominated: Outstanding Performance by an Actress in a Leading Role – Masako Natsume (also nominated for Time and Tide)
- Nominated: Outstanding Performance by an Actor in a Supporting Role – Kōichi Satō (also nominated for Battle Anthem)
- Nominated: Outstanding Performance by an Actress in a Supporting Role – Yukiyo Toake (also nominated for Children of Nagasaki)
- Nominated: Screenplay of the Year – Yōzō Tanaka

8th Hochi Film Awards

- Won: Best Actress – Masako Natsume (also won for Time and Tide)

38th Mainichi Film Awards

- Won: Best Actor – Ken Ogata (also won for The Ballad of Narayama and The Geisha)
