= The Geisha (1983 film) =

- Film poster
- Directed by: Hideo Gosha
- Screenplay by: Kōji Takada
- Based on: Yōkirō by Tomiko Miyao
- Produced by: Takeshi Endō; Kyô Namura
- Starring: Ken Ogata; Kimiko Ikegami; Atsuko Asano; Mitsuko Baisho; Noriko Hayami; Asao Koike
- Cinematography: Fujio Morita
- Edited by: Isamu Ichida
- Music by: Masaru Sato
- Production company: Toei Company
- Distributed by: Toei Company
- Release date: September 10, 1983 (Japan)
- Running time: 144 minutes
- Country: Japan
- Language: Japanese

The Geisha (Japanese: 陽暉楼, Hepburn: Yōkirō) is a 1983 Japanese period drama film directed by Hideo Gosha, with a screenplay written by Kōji Takada. It is based on the novel Yōkirō by Tomiko Miyao. The film was theatrically released on September 10, 1983, by Toei Company, in Japan.

== Premise ==
The film follows the loves and losses of a geisha in 1933 Imperial Japan.

20 years prior, in 1913, a man named Katsuzo is in love with a young geisha. She bears him a daughter. They attempt to run away together, but they are caught, and Katsuzo's lover is killed in front of him.

Decades later, Katsuzo has become a zegen (a pimp) who sells girls to Yōkirō, the largest and most successful geisha house in Western Japan. Yōkirō is home to over 200 geisha and is run by Osode, Katsuzo's former mistress. Katsuzo sells his daughter to Yōkirō when she is only 12 years old. She is raised by Osode and the other geisha, with Osode giving her the name Momowaka. Though Momowaka lives glamorously as Osode's top geisha, her life and relationships are turbulent.

Katsuzo's current girlfriend, Tamako, wants to become a geisha too, as Momowaka falls in love with one of her clients. Meanwhile, various factions vie for Yōkirō, including one of Osaka's yakuza clans, which moves to take control of the establishment.

== Cast ==
- Ken Ogata as Katsuzo
- Kimiko Ikegami as Momowaka
- Atsuko Asano as Tamako
- Mitsuko Baisho as Osode
- Noriko Hayami
- Asao Koike
- Tetsurō Tamba as Kochi Notable
- Morio Kazama as Hidetsugu of Niō

== Awards and nominations ==
8th Hochi Film Awards

- Won: Best Supporting Actress (Mitsuko Baisho)

7th Japan Academy Awards

- Won: Director of the Year (Hideo Gosha)
- Won: Outstanding Performance by an Actor in a Supporting Role (Morio Kazama, also won for Theater of Life)

38th Mainichi Film Awards

- Won: Best Actor (Ken Ogata, also won for The Ballad of Narayama and The Catch)
