= Kondō Chōjirō =

Japanese politician (1838–1866)

Kondō Chōjirō 近藤長次郎
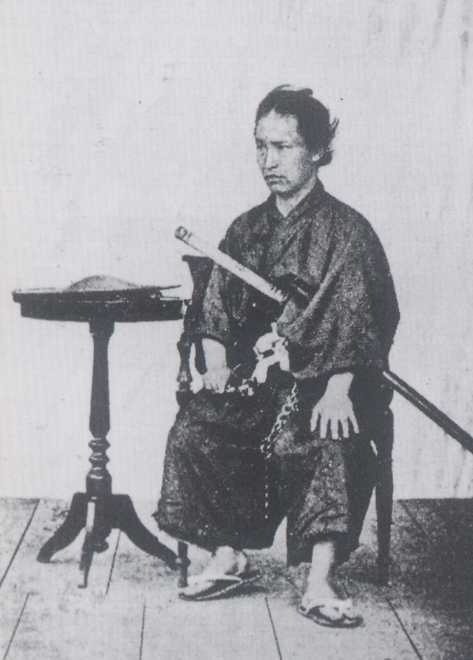
- Kondō Chōjirō
- Born: 1 April 1838; Kōchi, Tosa Province, Tokugawa Shogunate
- Died: 28 February 1866 (aged 27); Nagasaki, Hizen Province, Tokugawa Shogunate
- Cause of death: Seppuku
- Other names: Uesugi Sōjirō, Kondō Chōjirō, Baikadōjin, Manjuya Chōjirō
- Occupations: Samurai, politician
- Spouse: O-Toku (daughter of Yamatoya Yahichi)

Japanese name
- Kyūjitai: 近藤 長次郎

Kondō Chōjirō (近藤長次郎; 1 April 1838 – 28 February 1866) was a Japanese politician of the Bakumatsu period. His given name was Harumune. He was also known by the aliases Uesugi Sōjirō, Kondō Chōjirō (written with the variant character 昶), and Baikadōjin.

== Early life ==
Kondō Chōjirō was born on 1 April 1838 in the castle town of Kōchi in the han (domain) of Tosa, located in Tosa Province (present-day Kōchi Prefecture) on the island of Shikoku. By the Japanese calendar, Kondō was born on the 7th day of the 3rd month of the ninth year of Tenpō. He was the son of a manju merchant, and Chōjirō himself also sold manju. As his family had no surname, he was initially called Manjuya Chōjirō.

Intelligent from an early age, Kondō entered the school of Kawada Shōryū in Tosa and later studied under Iwasaki Yatarō. In 1859, he traveled to Edo as a servant of Tosa domain senior official Yui Inai, where he studied Confucianism under Asaka Gonsai, Western learning under Tezuka Genkai, and gunnery under Takashima Shūhan.

In 1862, Kondō became a student of Katsu Kaishū. His talent was recognized by domain lord Yamauchi Yōdō, and in 1863 he was granted the right to bear a surname and wear swords. In June of the same year, he enrolled at Katsu's private school in Kobe to study navigation. When the Kobe Naval Training Center was established in May 1864, Kondō enrolled as an auditing student under the designation "retainer of Katsu Awanokami." Afterward, when Katsu fell from power, Kondō lost his place and left the domain without authorization.

During this period, in September 1863, Kondō married O-Toku, daughter of Yamatoya Yahichi in Osaka, and their first son was born in July of the following year.

== Career ==
=== With Satsuma ===
Katsu requested support from the Satsuma Domain, which was itself short of warship crew members, so Kondō and others were taken in by the Satsuma Domain. In February 1865, they traveled to Kagoshima and came under the wing of Komatsu Tatewaki, serving in ship operations. They became a group of rōnin centered on former Tosa domain men who called themselves the shachū (the Company). At this stage, Kondō had no connection with Sakamoto Ryōma.

On 21 July 1865 (lunar calendar), a historic meeting between Komatsu Tatewaki, Inoue Bunta, and Itō Shunsuke resulted in the decision for Satsuma to lend its name to allow Chōshū to purchase weapons. When Inoue accompanied Komatsu to Kagoshima to lay the groundwork for a warship purchase, Kondō provided support. According to a biography of Inoue published in 1907 (Inoue-haku Den, vol. 4, by Nakahara Kunihira), Kondō argued to Satsuma domain samurai for the importance of Satsuma–Chōshū cooperation in order to overthrow the Tokugawa shogunate.

=== Arms trade and the Union-go ===
Kondō led the transport of weapons from Nagasaki to the Chōshū Domain, and was granted an audience with the Chōshū domain lord Mōri Takachika, who entrusted him with the purchase of the steamship Union-go and expressed gratitude for his efforts in procuring and transporting arms. Kondō was presented with a set of three ceremonial sword fittings (mitokoromono) and was entrusted with letters of thanks from the Chōshū lord and his father addressed to Shimazu Hisamitsu and Shimazu Mochihisa. He was regarded by the Chōshū domain not as a Tosa rōnin but as a Satsuma samurai.

Kondō was on familiar terms with Iwasaki Yatarō, who gave him a sword as a farewell gift when he left Tosa. Together with fellow Tosa native Sakamoto Ryōma, Kondō co-founded the Kameyama Shachū, which later became the Kaientai. He also traveled to Chōshū on Ryōma's orders to sell rifles, receiving personal words of thanks from lord Mōri Takachika.

Kondō purchased the steamship Union-go, but a dispute arose with the Chōshū domain over the terms of its handover. However, because Ryōma mediated, it is said that Chōshū paid a gratuity.

== Death ==
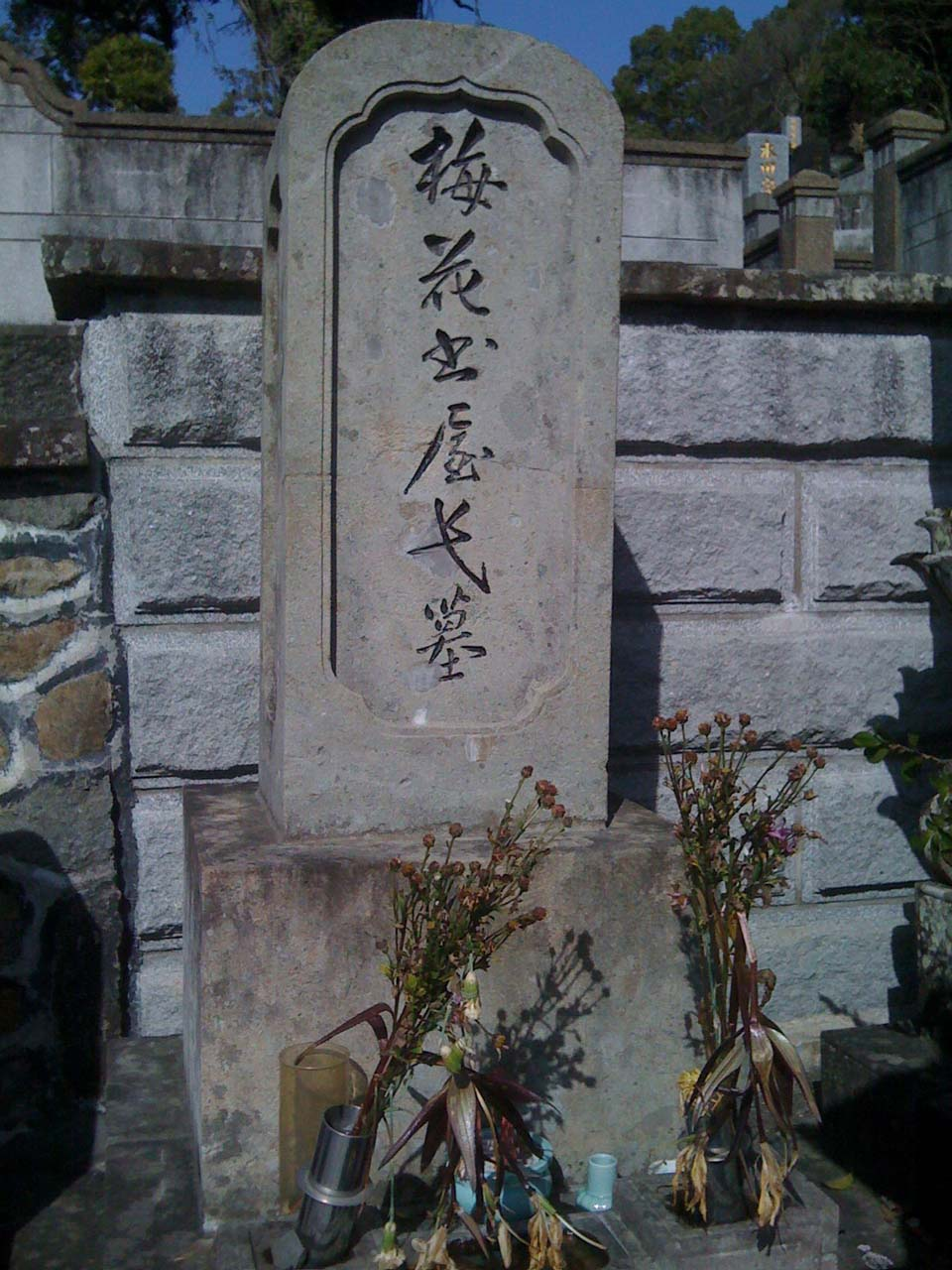
Grave of Kondō Chōjirō, Nagasaki

Kondō had arranged to travel to Great Britain for study abroad, with costs covered by Satsuma domain elder Komatsu Tatewaki and passage arranged by British merchant Thomas Blake Glover. However, he was accused by fellow members of the shachū, including Sawamura Sonojō, of violating the organization's code of conduct. He subsequently took responsibility by committing seppuku at the residence of Kosone Kendō in Nagasaki on 28 February 1866. He was 29 years old.

A theory holds that Sakamoto Ryōma personally ordered the seppuku, but Ryōma was in Kyoto at the time working to forge the Satchō Alliance and was not present in Nagasaki. It is highly probable that the decision was made by members of the shachū in his absence.

Ryōma's wife Oryō later recalled in her memoir Senri no Koma Gojitsu no Hanashi that upon hearing of Kondō's death, Ryōma lamented: "If I had been there, I would not have let them kill him." In Ryōma's own notebook there is a critical entry about "Uesugi" — Kondō's alias — reading: "He had an excess of cunning and a lack of sincerity. That is why Uesugi brought about his own ruin."

His funeral was held by fellow members of the shachū. His grave was originally built quietly behind that of Takashima Shūhan, a Bakumatsu-era artillery expert, in the Kōdai-ji cemetery, but has since been relocated to the family cemetery of the Kosone family, who supported the loyalist samurai alongside Oura Kei. The gravestone bears the inscription "Tomb of the Baikashooku" (梅花書屋氏墓), taken from the name of the detached Kosone residence. The calligraphy is attributed to Sakamoto Ryōma.

In 1898, Kondō was posthumously awarded the Senior Fifth Rank (Shō-go-i).

== In popular culture ==
=== Television ===
- Ryōma ga Yuku (1968, NHK Taiga drama; portrayed by Noriaki Kitaura)
- Tennō no Seiki Part 2, Episode 11 "Nagasaki to Kameyama Shachū" (1973, ABC TV; portrayed by Shun'ichirō Okita)
- Katsu Kaishū (1974, NHK Taiga drama; portrayed by Sōichirō Kitamura)
- Ryōma ga Yuku (1982, TV Tokyo; portrayed by Daijirō Harada)
- Bakumatsu Seishun Graffiti: Sakamoto Ryōma (1982, NTV; portrayed by Hikaru Murozumi)
- Sakamoto Ryōma (1989, TBS; portrayed by Teruyuki Kagawa)
- Yabō no Kuni: Arashi no Shō (1989, NTV; portrayed by Teruyuki Kagawa)
- Katsu Kaishū (1990, NTV; portrayed by Jun'ichi Ōkura)
- Ryōma ni Omakase! (1996, NTV; portrayed by Masaki Kitahara)
- Ryōma ga Yuku (2004, TV Tokyo; portrayed by Asahi Hasegawa)
- Ryōmaden (2010, NHK Taiga drama; portrayed by Yo Oizumi)

=== Film ===
- Bakumatsu (1970; portrayed by Katsuo Nakamura)
- Bakumatsu Seishun Graffiti: Ronin Sakamoto Ryōma (1986; portrayed by Seiji Kurasaki)

=== Anime ===
- O~i! Ryōma (1992–1993, NHK; voiced by Shōko Suzuki (young), Shin-ichiro Miki (adult))

=== Manga ===
- O~i! Ryōma (original story by Tetsuya Takeda, art by Yū Koyama)
- Ryōma ga Yuku (original story by Ryōtarō Shiba, art by Yū Suzuki)
