= Shigenaga =

- Gender: Male

Origin
- Origin: Japanese
- Meaning: Different meanings depending on the kanji used

Shigenaga (written: 重長, 重永 or 繁長) is a masculine Japanese given name. Notable people with the name include:

- Atomu Shigenaga (重永 亜斗夢; born 1988), Japanese golfer
- Edo Shigenaga, Japanese noble
- Honjō Shigenaga (本庄 繁長; 1540–1614), Japanese samurai
- Katakura Shigenaga (片倉 重長; 1585–1659), Japanese samurai
- Nejime Shigenaga (禰寝 重長; 1536–1580), Japanese samurai
- Nishimura Shigenaga (西村 重長; 1697–1756), Japanese ukiyo-e artist
