= Pecoross' Mother and Her Days =

- Theatrical release poster
- Directed by: Azuma Morisaki
- Written by: Tomoaki Akune
- Based on: Pekorosu no Haha ni Ai ni Iku by Yuichi Okano
- Produced by: Katsuhiko Muraoka
- Starring: Harue Akagi
- Cinematography: Takeshi Hamada
- Edited by: Sozo Morisaki
- Music by: Katsu Hoshi; Yuzo Hayashi
- Release date: November 16, 2013 (Japan)
- Running time: 113 minutes
- Country: Japan
- Language: Japanese

Pecoross' Mother and Her Days (Japanese: ペコロスの母に会いに行く, Hepburn: Pekorosu no Haha ni Ai ni Iku) is a 2013 Japanese drama film directed by Azuma Morisaki and based on a manga by Yuichi Okano. It was released in Japan on November 16. The film focuses on the treatment of the elderly in Japan, which suffers from a serious problem of aging population.

== Plot ==
The movie narrates the daily life full of humor and melancholy of Yuichi Okano, born and raised in Nagasaki, who due to his baldness is known as "pecoros" (small onion) by his mother, Mitsue. Widowed and suffering from dementia for 10 years, she is transitioning to an elderly facility. With many flashbacks to the past, the film depicts their daily life that is full of humor and sweet sorrow.

== Cast ==
- Harue Akagi as Mitsue Okano
- Ryo Iwamatsu as Yuichi Okano
- Kiwako Harada as Young Mitsue Okano
- Ryo Kase as Satoru Okano
- Kensuke Owada as Masaki Okano
- Tomoyo Harada as Chieko
- Naoto Takenaka as Honda
- Sumie Sasaki as Matsu
- Yoichi Nukumizu as Cafe owner
- Ryudo Uzaki as Conductor
- Wakana Matsumoto as Nursing home staff
- Nao Nagasawa as Nursing home staff

== Reception ==
=== Accolades ===
It was chosen as the best Japanese film of 2013 by the film magazines Eiga Geijutsu and Kinema Junpo.

Awards
Award	Date of ceremony	Category	Recipients and nominees	Result
Mainichi Film Award	January, 2014	Award of Excellence		Won
Mainichi Film Award	January, 2014	Best Actress	Harue Akagi	Won
