= Goyokin =

1969 Japanese jidaigeki film by Hideo Gosha

- Theatrical release poster
- Directed by: Hideo Gosha
- Screenplay by: Hideo Gosha; Kei Tasaka
- Produced by: Sanezumi Fujimoto; Hideo Fukuda; Hideyuki Shiino; Masayuki Sato
- Starring: Tatsuya Nakadai; Tetsurō Tamba; Yōko Tsukasa; Ruriko Asaoka; Nakamura Kinnosuke
- Cinematography: Kozo Okazaki
- Edited by: Michio Suwa
- Music by: Masaru Sato
- Production companies: Fuji Television; Tokyo Eiga
- Distributed by: Toho
- Release date: 1 May 1969 (Japan)
- Running time: 124 minutes
- Country: Japan
- Budget: ¥200 million

Goyokin (Japanese: 御用金, Hepburn: Goyōkin; lit. "Official Gold") is a 1969 Japanese jidaigeki film directed by Hideo Gosha. Set during the late Tokugawa period, the story follows a reclusive rōnin who is trying to atone for past transgressions.

== Plot ==
Magobei Wakizaka is a samurai for the Sabai clan. A nearby island, Sado, boasts a rich gold mine which provides plentiful riches for the Tokugawa clan. When one of the gold ships sinks, the local fishermen recover some of the gold, intending to return it to the Tokugawa clan. However, Magobei's clan master, Rokugo Tatewaki, takes the gold and slaughters the fishermen so they cannot report the gold stolen. Magobei is appalled. He promises not to report Rokugo to the shogunate in exchange for Rokugo's promise to never do so again.

However, three years later, assassins sent by Rokugo's retainer, Kunai, come for Magobei, who is living in Edo. He realizes that Rokugo intends to steal more gold and slaughter more innocents. So Magobei returns to Sabai to face his former master. Rokugo hires another ronin, Samon Fujimaki, to kill Magobei, but as he is a spy for the Shogun, he joins forces with Magobei. Also, along the way, Magobei meets a young woman, Oriha, who survived the original slaughter. She and her brother, Rokuzo, join him on his way to Sabai.

At Sabai they learn that Rokugo intends to move a bonfire, which serves as a warning to passing ships against dangerous rocks, so that a gold ship will hit the rocks and sink. After recovering the gold, Rokugo intends to slaughter the peasants who help him in this endeavor. The combined efforts of Magobei, Samon, Oriha, and Rokuzo result in the correct bonfire being lit, the fake bonfire being put out, and the innocent peasants' lives being saved. Thus the gold-bearing ship evades the rocks. In a final showdown, amid falling snow, Magobei slays Rokugo, but is wounded by one of Rokugo's throwing knives. As the villagers and Oriha celebrate surviving their brush with death, Magobei leaves his sword at Rokugo's grave and wordlessly walks off into the snow.

== Cast ==
- Tatsuya Nakadai as Magobei Wakizaka
- Kinnosuke Nakamura as Samon Fujimaki
- Tetsurō Tamba as Rokugo Tatewaki, Magobei's childhood friend, brother-in-law, and clan master
- Yoko Tsukasa as Shino, Rokugo's sister and Magobei's wife
- Ruriko Asaoka as Oriha
- Isao Natsuyagi as Kunai
- Ben Hiura as Rokuzo
- Kunie Tanaka as Hirosuke
- Susumu Kurobe as Omura Sobei
- Kō Nishimura as Ryu Ichigaku
- Hisashi Igawa as Takeuchi
- Eijirō Tōno as a Chief retainer

== Production ==
Goyokin was the first Japanese production shot in Panavision. Initially, Toshiro Mifune was cast in Kinnosuke Nakamura's role, but was replaced several weeks into filming.

== Release ==
Goyokin was released as a roadshow theatrical release in Japan on 1 May 1969 where it was distributed by Toho. The film received a general release in Japan on 17 May 1969.

The film was released in the United States by Toho International with English subtitles in September 1969. It was reissued in the United States with an English-language dub and a running time of 85 minutes under the title The Steel Edge of Revenge in September 1974.

== Reception ==
Goyokin won the awards for Best Cinematography and Best Art Direction (Motoji Kojima) at the Mainichi Film Concours.

== See also ==
- Sabae Domain, of which Goyokin's "Sabai Domain" is a fictionalized version
