= Hunter in the Dark (film) =

- Film poster
- Directed by: Hideo Gosha
- Screenplay by: Kaneo Ikegami
- Based on: Yami no Karyudo by Shōtarō Ikenami
- Produced by: Gin'ichi Kishimoto; Masayuki Satō; Shigemi Sugisaki
- Starring: Tatsuya Nakadai; Yoshio Harada; Tetsuro Tamba; Mikio Narita; Keiko Kishi; Ayumi Ishida; Sonny Chiba
- Cinematography: Tadashi Sakai
- Edited by: Michio Suwa
- Music by: Masaru Sato
- Distributed by: Shochiku
- Release date: June 17, 1979 (Japan)
- Running time: 125 minutes
- Country: Japan
- Language: Japanese

Hunter in the Dark (Japanese: 闇の狩人, Hepburn: Yami no Karyudo) is a 1979 Japanese jidaigeki film directed by Hideo Gosha. It is based on Shōtarō Ikenami's novel of the same title.

== Plot ==
Sasaio Heizaburo is a skilled samurai with amnesia. One day, he meets Gomyo Kiyoemon. Kiyoemon gives him the name Tanigawa Yataro and starts using him as a hit man.

== Cast ==
- Tatsuya Nakadai as Gomyo Kiyoemon
- Yoshio Harada as Tanigawa Yataro(Sasao Heizaburo)
- Tetsuro Tamba as Tanuma Ogitsugu
- Mikio Narita as Toramatsu
- Makoto Fujita as Kasuke
- Hajime Hana as Sukegorō
- Tatsuo Umemiya as Yaichi
- Kōji Yakusho as Kuwano
- Hideo Murota as Sakimatsu
- Hideji Otaki as Jihei
- Eijirō Tōno as Shōgen
- Daisuke Ryu as Bunkichi
- Keiko Kishi as Omon
- Ayumi Ishida as Oriha
- Isao Natsuyagi as Matsu
- Sonny Chiba as Shimoguni Samon

== Production ==
- Yoshinobu Nishioka - Art direction
