= Harue Akagi =

Japanese actress (1924–2018)

- Born: March 14, 1924; Changchun, China
- Died: November 29, 2018 (aged 94); Fuchū, Tokyo
- Occupation: Actress
- Years active: 1940–2018

Harue Akagi (赤木春恵, Akagi Harue; March 14, 1924 – November 29, 2018) was a Japanese actress.

== Filmography ==
=== Films ===
- Akō Rōshi: Ten no Maki, Chi no Maki (1956)
- Magic Boy (1959)
- Bushido, Samurai Saga (1963)
- Karafuto 1945 Summer Hyosetsu no Mon (1974)
- Nichiren (1979)
- Pecoross' Mother and Her Days (2013)

=== Television ===
- Taikōki (1965)
- Kinpachi-sensei (1979–2011)
- Onna Taikōki (1981), as Naka (Hideyoshi's mother)
- Oshin (1983), as Hisa Kamiyama
- Toshiie to Matsu (2002), as Ume

== Honours ==
- Medal with Purple Ribbon (1993)
- Order of the Precious Crown, 4th Class, Wisteria (1998)
