= Tora-san, His Tender Love =

- Theatrical poster
- Directed by: Azuma Morisaki
- Written by: Yoji Yamada; Shun'ichi Kobayashi; Akira Miyazaki
- Starring: Kiyoshi Atsumi; Michiyo Aratama
- Cinematography: Tetsuo Takaba
- Edited by: Yoshi Sugihara
- Music by: Naozumi Yamamoto
- Distributed by: Shochiku
- Release date: January 15, 1970 (Japan)
- Running time: 90 minutes
- Country: Japan
- Language: Japanese

Tora-san, His Tender Love (Japanese: 男はつらいよ フーテンの寅, Hepburn: Otoko wa Tsurai yo: Fūten no Tora) is a 1970 Japanese comedy film directed by Azuma Morisaki, instead of the usual director Yoji Yamada. It stars Kiyoshi Atsumi as Kuruma Torajirō (Tora-san), and Michiyo Aratama as his love interest or "Madonna". Tora-san, His Tender Love is the third entry in the popular, long-running Otoko wa Tsurai yo series, and the first of only two in the series not directed by Yoji Yamada.

== Plot ==
Set in 1969, the sick Torajiro ("Tora") meets a girl living at the accommodating house where Tora is staying. At this point, they exchange info about their family (though Tora lies), where we learn that the girl has no place to stay.

Tora comes back shortly after. At dinnertime the family (except Sakura, not present at the scene) converse about the matter of Tora arranging a matchmaking meeting (Miai), and eventually getting a wife. Eventually he puts a lot of requests on the table before eventually going to bed.

The next day, Tora and his family go out to participate in the Miai. However, the Miai partner, Komako, whom Tora had already met while travelling, recognize each other. Komako states that she had a husband and was pregnant, but he ended up finding another woman, leaving her pregnant and alone. Komako's husband was brought to Toraya, and the two apologize. There is then a wedding celebration at Toraya. Then, Tora orders an overseas car to come over and escort the couple to a honeymoon. Unsurprisingly, however, the uncle, aunt, and Hiroshi get into an argument with Tora about the taxi-bill. Things end up getting physical, and Tora ends up leaving the house.

A month passes. Tora is staying and working at a hotel in Yunoyama Onsen, after being found selling products, while also having abnormal health. He was allowed into a hotel for free, and develops a love interest for Shizu (called Oshizu by Tora), the mistress of the hotel. Eventually he also started working for the hotel. Sometime later, he also meets Nobuo, who at first treats Tora badly. It is eventually found that Nobuo also has a love for a geisha named Someko, and that love is causing mental trouble for him.

Not long later, Nobuo tries commit suicide with his motorcycle, only to have Tora come along. He stops by at Someko's house, finally allowing for him to start a relationship with Someko. Not long after, Oshizu also decides to marry a man named Mr. Yoshii. Not long after, however, while Tora was hanging out with Oshizu's child, he gets sick. At this point there are many attempts to tell Tora that Oshizu would now remarry Mr. Yoshii, with much difficulty. Eventually, when Tora finally finds out, he leaves with a letter.

It is the New Years at Toraya, and Komako (and her husband) come over to Toraya. As the Tora family is eating Toshikoshi-soba while watching TV, Tora, at Kirishima Shrine, appears on TV. Tora stupidly answers questions on TV before also trying to get Oshizu's attention.

However, by the epilogue scene, we can still see Tora's smile and laugh as he heads to Sakurajima.

== Cast ==
- Kiyoshi Atsumi as Torajiro
- Michiyo Aratama as Oshizu
- Shin Morikawa as Ryūzō Azuma
- Chieko Misaki as Tsune Kuruma (Torajiro's aunt)
- Gin Maeda as Hiroshi Suwa
- Chieko Baisho as Sakura Suwa

== Critical appraisal ==
The German-language site molodezhnaja gives Tora-san, His Tender Love three and a half out of five stars.

== Availability ==
Tora-san, His Tender Love was released theatrically on January 15, 1970. In Japan, the film was released on videotape in 1989 and 1995, and in DVD format in 2000, 2005 and 2008. AnimEigo released the film on DVD in the US along with the other first four films in the Otoko wa Tsurai yo series on November 24, 2009.

== Bibliography ==
=== English ===
- "OTOKO WA TSURAI YU FUTEN NO TORA (1969)". British Film Institute. Archived from the original on 2012-10-17.
- "OTOKO WA TSURAIYO -FUTEN NO TORA". Complete Index to World Film.
- Otoko wa Tsurai yo: Fûten no Tora (1970) at IMDb
- Rich, Jamie S. (2009-12-21). "Tora-San: Collector's Set 1". DVD Talk.

=== German ===
- "Tora-San, His Tender Love" (in German). www.molodezhnaja.ch.

=== Japanese ===
- 男はつらいよ フーテンの寅(1970) (in Japanese). allcinema.net.
- "男はつらいよ フーテンの寅". Japanese Cinema Database (Agency for Cultural Affairs). Archived from the original on 2011-10-08.
- 男はつらいよ フーテンの寅 (in Japanese). Japanese Movie Database.
- 男はつらいよ フーテンの寅 (in Japanese). Kinema Junpo. Archived from the original on 2012-03-09.
