= Fireflies in the North =

- DVD cover
- Directed by: Hideo Gosha
- Written by: Kōji Takada
- Produced by: Takeshi Endō; Kazuyuki Satō; Mineo Zushi
- Starring: Tatsuya Nakadai; Shima Iwashita; Shigeru Tsuyuguchi; Mikio Narita; Kōichi Satō; Kunihiko Mitamura
- Cinematography: Fujiro Morita
- Edited by: Isamu Ichida
- Music by: Masaru Sato
- Distributed by: Toei Company
- Release date: September 1, 1984 (Japan)
- Running time: 125 minutes
- Country: Japan
- Language: Japanese

Fireflies in the North (Japanese: 北の螢, Hepburn: Kita no hotaru) is a 1984 Japanese film directed by Hideo Gosha. The lead star is Tatsuya Nakadai.

== Plot ==
The film depicts the conflict between the prisoners forced to work as manpower of Hokkaido settlers and the administrators of the Kabato district as well as the love and hate of the women who gathered there during the Meiji era.

== Cast ==
- Tatsuya Nakadai as Takeshi Tsukigata
- Shima Iwashita as Yu Nakamura
- Mari Natsuki as Suma
- Isao Natsuyagi as Kakumu
- Kōichi Satō as Yakichi
- Kunihiko Mitamura as Denji Masaki
- Masanari Nihei as Kumagai
- Hiroshi Miyauchi as Unno
- Reiko Nakamura as Hamagiku
- Junko Takazawa
- Shunsuke Kariya as Tsuyoshi
- Arase Nagahide as Yoshida Susumu
- Naruse Tadashi as Nakajima Senkichi
- Hatsuo Yamane as Marutoku
- Kai Atō as Ryuzo
- Seizo Fukumoto
- Arase Nagahide as Susumu Yoshida
- Toru Masuoka as Kanda
- Ai Saotome as Setsu Furuya
- Yoshio Inaba as Besho Ken
- Daisuke Ryu as Nagakura Shinpachi
- Asao Koike as Yuhara Tadayoshi
- Tetsuro Tamba as Ishikura
- Mikio Narita as Kanbei kido
- Shigeru Tsuyuguchi as Kōnoshin Oga

== Production ==
- Yoshinobu Nishioka - Art direction
