= Nejime Shigenaga =

Nejime Shigenaga (禰寝 重長, 1536 – 1580)

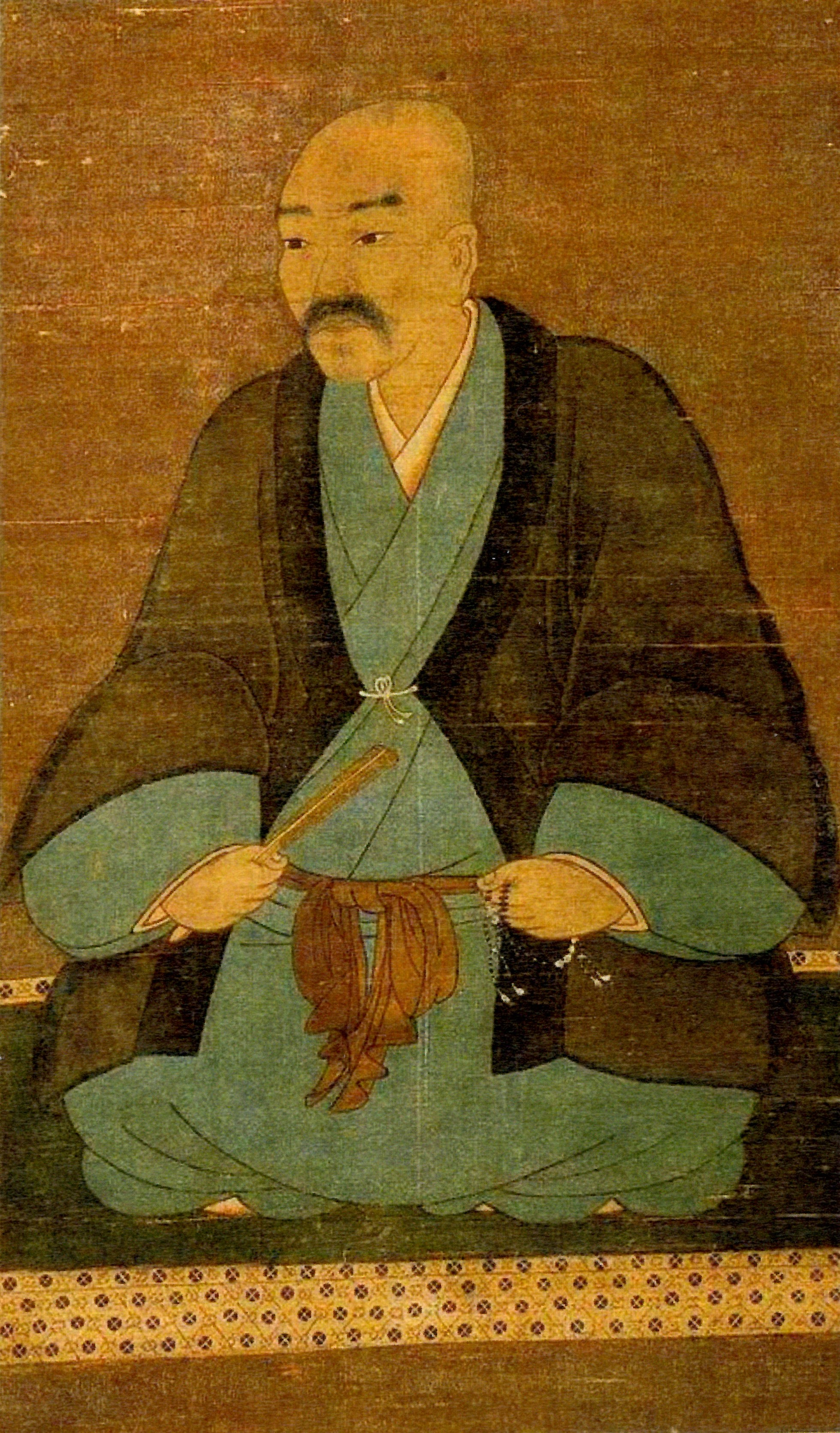
Nejime Shigenaga

was a Japanese samurai of the Sengoku period through Azuchi-Momoyama period. The son of Nejime Kiyotoshi, Shigenaga was a retainer of the Kimotsuki clan, and the 16th generation head of his family. He joined Kimotsuki Kanetsugu in the fight against the Shimazu in Ōsumi Province. However, following the Kimotsuki clan's defeat, Shigenaga saw that the family's position was untenable, so he independently concluded a peace agreement with Shimazu Yoshihisa. This incurred the wrath of Kimotsuki Kanesuke, who attacked him; however, the Shimazu were able to save Shigenaga from death. Later, Shigenaga became a retainer under Shimazu Yoshihisa, and assisted the Shimazu clan in issues of trade. Shigenaga is said to be the first person who encouraged the cultivation of mandarin oranges in Japan.

Shigenaga was the ancestor of Komatsu Tatewaki, the famous Bakumatsu-era senior councilor of Satsuma han.
