= Onimasa =

1982 Japanese yakuza film

- AnimEigo DVD cover

Japanese name
- Kanji: 鬼龍院花子の生涯
Transcriptions
- Revised Hepburn: Kiryūin Hanako no Shōgai
- Directed by: Hideo Gosha
- Screenplay by: Koji Takada
- Based on: Kiryūin Hanako no Shōgai by Tomiko Miyao
- Starring: Tatsuya Nakadai; Masako Natsume
- Cinematography: Fujiro Morita
- Edited by: Isamu Ichida
- Music by: Mitsuteru Kanno
- Production companies: Toei; Haiyuza Theatre Company
- Distributed by: Toei
- Release date: June 5, 1982 (Japan)
- Running time: 146 minutes
- Country: Japan
- Language: Japanese
- Box office: ¥1.1 billion

Onimasa, known in Japan as Kiryūin Hanako no Shōgai (Japanese: 鬼龍院花子の生涯; lit. 'The Life of Hanako Kiryuin'), is a 1982 Japanese yakuza film directed by Hideo Gosha. Based on Tomiko Miyao's 1980 novel Kiryūin Hanako no Shōgai. It was Japan's submission to the 55th Academy Awards for the Academy Award for Best Foreign Language Film, but was not accepted as a nominee.

== Cast ==
- Tatsuya Nakadai as Masagoro Kiryuin a.k.a Onimasa
- Masako Natsume as adult Matsue Kiryuin
- Nobuko Sendō as child Matsue Kiryuin
- Shima Iwashita as Uta Kiryuin
- Hideo Murota as Sagara
- Kaori Tagasugi as Hanako Kiryuin
- Akiko Kana as Tsuru, Onimasa's mistress and Hinako's mother
- Emi Shindō as Emiwaka, Onimasa's Mistress
- Akiko Nakamura as Botan, Onimasa's Mistress
- Ryōhei Uchida as Suenaga
- Mari Natsuki as Akio, Suenaga's wife
- Kei Yamamoto as Kyosuke Tanabe
- Tetsuro Tanba as Uichi Suda, "The Big Boss" in some English credits
- Tatsuo Umemiya as Masaru Yamane
- Kōji Yakusho as Kondo
- Masahiko Tanimura as Shirai Zenhichi, Matsue's biological father
- Torahiko Hamada as Dr. Katō
- Naoya Makoto as Tetsuo Gondo
- Eitaro Ozawa as Genichiro Tanabe, Kyosuke's father
- Mikio Narita as Tsujihara
- Seizō Fukumoto as an assassin

== Production ==
After seeing Tomiko Miyao's 1980 novel Kiryūin Hanako no Shōgai in a bookstore, actress Meiko Kaji wished to make a film adaptation. Imagining herself in the lead role of Matsue and Tomisaburo Wakayama as Onimasa, Kaji pitched the movie to Toei. After several months without hearing anything, Toei publicly announced that they would be adapting the novel. When she inquired about it, Kaji was offered any role in the film, except the lead, so she refused. She later described the incident as having the project "stolen" from her.

Producer Goro Kusakabe described the events differently, stating that Kaji simply handed him the book and expressed interest in playing the lead in what was already a project under consideration for adaptation. He also explained that he decided against her playing Matsue because she was too mature for a role that followed a character from childhood to adulthood. Despite Toei president Shigeru Okada tasking Kusakabe with creating a film that would attract female movie-goers, Okada turned down Kiryūin Hanako no Shōgai several times, so Kusakabe re-framed his pitch as a film following a yakuza boss who lives with his wife and mistresses and "has sex whenever he wants".

At the time, Hideo Gosha was struggling financially after suffering hardships in his personal and family life. A longtime fan of Miyao who wanted to adapt one of her works for some time, he got the job directing thanks to one of his friends suggesting Okada give him a comeback film. Shinobu Otake was offered the lead role of Matsue, but refused to work with Toei's Kyoto studio. After six months of looking, the lead role was ultimately given to young actress and former model Masako Natsume. Kusakabe cast "serious actor" Tatsuya Nakadai as Onimasa in order to give the film a different impression from those of the studio's typical yakuza films. After Gosha pleaded, Okada pulled some strings in order to get Shima Iwashita, who was known for working at rival studio Shochiku, in the role of Uta.

Filming was halted for a month while Natsume underwent thyroid surgery for Graves' disease.

== Release ==
Onimasa earned 1.1 billion yen at the Japanese box office.

It was distributed in the United States in October 1985 with English-subtitles.

== Awards and nominations ==
At the Japanese Academy Awards, Onimasa was nominated for Best Picture, Best Actor (Nakadai), Best Actress (Natsume) and Best Director (Gosho).

25th Blue Ribbon Awards

- Won: Best Actress - Masako Natsume

== See also ==
- Cinema of Japan
- List of submissions to the 55th Academy Awards for Best Foreign Language Film
- List of Japanese submissions for the Academy Award for Best Foreign Language Film
