= The Wolves (1971 film) =

1971 Japanese film by Hideo Gosha

- Film poster
- Directed by: Hideo Gosha
- Screenplay by: Kei Tasaka; Hideo Gosha
- Produced by: Sanezumi Fujimoto; Eiji Shiino
- Starring: Tatsuya Nakadai; Noboru Ando; Toshio Kurosawa; Komaki Kurihara
- Cinematography: Kozo Okazaki
- Edited by: Michio Suwa
- Music by: Masaru Sato
- Production company: Tokyo Eiga
- Distributed by: Toho
- Release date: 30 October 1971 (Japan)
- Running time: 130 minutes
- Country: Japan

The Wolves (Japanese: 出所祝い, Hepburn: Shussho iwai; lit. Celebration of a Prisoner's Release) is a 1971 Japanese crime film directed by Hideo Gosha.

== Release ==
The film was released theatrically in Japan on 30 October 1971 by Toho. The film was released by Toho International in the United States with English subtitles on 7 June 1972.

== Reception ==
Vincent Canby of the New York Times reviewed the film in 1982, describing it as "a rather enjoyable if often mysterious and esoteric entertainment for someone coming upon the genre for the first time." Canby concluded that the film was "resolutely sentimental and picturesque" and "a most peculiar mixture of stylized prettiness and blood and gore, which is, I suspect, the film's main purpose" and "makes a feeble stab at social criticism" and that a viewer may "not understand everything that's going on in The Wolves, but I doubt that you'll be bored." Time Out declared that, while "Hideo Gosha is virtually unknown in the West", The Wolves is "a yakuza movie in a class of its own" and "a stunningly realised thriller", concluding that "Gosha's muscular, Expressionist colour imagery blazes through the screen."

== Cast ==
- Tatsuya Nakadai
- Noboru Ando
- Toshio Kurosawa as Tsutomu Onodera

== See also ==
- List of Japanese films of 1971

== Footnotes ==
=== References ===
- Galbraith IV, Stuart (2008). The Toho Studios Story: A History and Complete Filmography. Scarecrow Press. ISBN 978-1461673743.
