= Yoshitsune (TV series) =

- Genre: Taiga drama
- Directed by: Mayuzumi Rintaro
- Starring: Hideaki Takizawa; Ken Matsudaira; Aya Ueto; Satomi Ishihara; Kiyotaka Nanbara; Tsuyoshi Ujiki; Atsushi Itō; Ken Kaitō; Hiroshi Abe; Yukiyoshi Ozawa; Kazushige Nagashima; Ikkei Watanabe; Kayoko Shiraishi; Ren Osugi; Masanobu Katsumura; Shingo Tsurumi; Masaya Kato; Masao Kusakari; Akihiro Miwa; Mari Natsuki; Akira Nakao; Ichikawa Sadanji IV; Naomi Zaizen; Izumi Inamori; Nenji Kobayashi; Keiko Matsuzaka; Tetsurō Tamba; Mikijirō Hira; Kiichi Nakai; Hideki Takahashi; Tetsuya Watari
- Narrated by: Kayoko Shiraishi
- Theme music composer: Taro Iwashiro
- Country of origin: Japan
- Original language: Japanese
- No. of episodes: 49

Original release
- Network: NHK
- Release: January 9 – December 11, 2005

Yoshitsune (義経) is a Japanese television drama series originally broadcast between 9 January and 11 December 2005, with a three-part special compilation being aired from 24 December to 25 December 2005. The 44th Taiga Drama, the original work is by Miyao Tomiko, screenplay by Kaneko Narito and starring Hideaki Takizawa.

== Plot ==
In the Heiji Rebellion, Taira no Kiyomori defeats Minamoto no Yoshitomo. Yoshitomo flees the battle but is betrayed by his own vassal and killed in Owari province. Yoritomo (one of Yoshitomo's sons) is captured, but Kiyomori decides to spare him and banishes him to Izu. Yoshitomo's beloved concubine Tokiwa Gozen flees to Kyoto with their three children. After learning that Kiyomori has arrested her own mother, Tokiwa goes to him to plead for mercy. Kiyomori spares the lives of the children, sending the older two to temples, and brings the youngest boy, Ushiwaka, and Tokiwa into his household. Treating him as his own child, Kiyomori receives criticism of his generous behavior towards Ushiwaka, the son of his enemy. Soon, he sends Ushiwaka to the Kurama temple where he is renamed Shanao. Shanao frequently escapes the temple at night, and this behavior makes it clear that he will not enter the priesthood. After learning the true identity of his father, of his Genji lineage, and of Kiyomori's plans to move against him he bids his mother farewell and travels northeast to Oshu.

While Kiyomori starts to build a dream city and international port in Fukuhara, he also starts to work his way into the Imperial Court, eventually marrying his daughter Tokiko to the Emperor. With this new power the Heike grow fierce and unpopular with the court and people of Kyoto. Shanao, now named Yoshitsune after his rite of manhood, is living under the guardianship of Fujiwara no Hidehira and decides to join his exiled older brother Minamoto no Yoritomo and throws himself into the feud between the Heike and Genji.

== Production credit ==
- Sword fight arranger - Kunishirō Hayashi

== Cast ==
=== Minamoto clan (Genji) ===
- Hideaki Takizawa as Minamoto no Yoshitsune
  - Ryunosuke Kamiki as young Yoshitsune (aka Ushiwakamaru)
- Kiichi Nakai as Minamoto no Yoritomo
  - Sosuke Ikematsu as young Yoritomo
- Ken Matsudaira as Benkei
- Aya Ueto as Utsubo
- Ren Ôsugi as Minamoto no Yukiie
- Masaya Kato as Minamoto no Yoshitomo
- Izumi Inamori as Tokiwa Gozen
- Satomi Ishihara as Shizuka Gozen
- Eiko Koike as Tomoe Gozen
- Naomi Zaizen as Hōjō Masako
- Nenji Kobayashi as Hōjō Tokimasa
- Noboru Kimura as Hōjō Yoshitoki
- Tetsurō Tamba as Minamoto no Yorimasa
- Tsubasa Imai as Nasu no Yoichi
- Akira Nakao as Kajiwara Kagetoki
- Shun Oguri as Kajiwara Kagesue
- Junpei Kusami as Adachi Morinaga
- Takashi Matsuo as Ōe no Hiromoto
- Mao Noguchi as Ōhime
- Yukiyoshi Ozawa as Minamoto no Yoshinaka

=== Taira clan (Heike) ===
- Tetsuya Watari as Taira no Kiyomori
- Keiko Matsuzaka as Taira no Tokiko, Kiyomori's wife
- Masanobu Katsumura as Taira no Shigemori
- Shingo Tsurumi as Taira no Munemori
  - Takahiro Itō as young Munemori
- Shigeki Hosokawa as Taira no Shigehira
- Hiroshi Abe as Taira no Tomomori
- Noriko Nakagoshi as Taira no Tokuko
- Toshiki Kashu as Taira no Koremori
- Kotaro Koizumi as Taira no Sukemori
- Maki Goto as Yoshiko
- Yōko Minamikaze as Ikenozenni
- Yuri Nakae as "Kenshunmon-in" Shigeko
- Tadahiko Hirano as Taira no Morikuni
- Binpachi Itō as Ōba Kagechika

=== Northern Fujiwara ===
- Hideki Takahashi as Fujiwara no Hidehira
- Ikkei Watanabe as Fujiwara no Yasuhira
- Kazushige Nagashima as Fujiwara no Kunihira

=== Imperial family ===
- Mikijirō Hira as Emperor Go-Shirakawa
- Mari Natsuki as Tango no Tsubone
- Tōru Baba as Emperor Takakura
- Ichikawa Otora VII as Emperor Antoku
- Masao Kusakari as Taira no Tomoyasu

== Accolades ==
8th Nikkan Sports Drama Grand Prix

- Won: Best Drama
- Won: Best Actor - Hideaki Takizawa
