= Time and Tide (1983 film) =

- Blu-ray cover

Japanese name
- Kanji: 時代屋の女房
- Kana: じだいやのにょうぼう
Transcriptions
- Revised Hepburn: Jidaiya no nyōbo
- Directed by: Azuma Morisaki
- Screenplay by: Azuma Morisaki; Haruhiko Arai
- Based on: Jidaiya no nyōbo by Tomomi Muramatsu
- Produced by: Kanji Nakagawa; Shigemi Sugisaki
- Starring: Tsunehiko Watase; Masako Natsume; Masahiko Tsugawa
- Music by: Toshiyuki Kimori
- Distributed by: Shochiku
- Release date: March 18, 1983 (Japan)
- Running time: 97 minutes
- Country: Japan
- Language: Japanese

Time and Tide (Japanese: 時代屋の女房, Hepburn: Jidaiya no nyōbo) is a 1983 Japanese film directed by Azuma Morisaki and based on a novel by Muramatsu Tomomi.

== Cast ==
- Tsunehiko Watase as Yasu-san
- Masako Natsume as Mayumi / Misato
- Masahiko Tsugawa as Sanrise no Master
- Kimiko Nakayama as Yuki-chan
- Hiroyuki Okita as Wakamono
- Shirō Ōsaka as Imai-san
- Kotoe Hatsui as Imai-san no Oku-san
- Yū Fujiki as Tonkichi no Oyaji
- Yumiko Fujita as Tonkichi no Okami
- Yukiji Asaoka as Kikuchi Matsue
- Cho Bang-ho as Watanabe-kun
- Mitsuru Hirata as Suzuki Ken-Ichi
- Sachiko Murase
- Akira Nagoya

== Awards and nominations ==
8th Hochi Film Award

- Won: Best Actress - Masako Natsume
