= Tomiko Miyao =

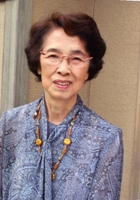
Miyao in 2009

Tomiko Miyao (宮尾 登美子; April 13, 1926 – December 30, 2014) was a Japanese novelist best known for writing historical fiction. Many of her works were adapted into television dramas and films, most notably Onimasa, Atsuhime, and Yoshitsune.

== Early life and education ==
Miyao was born in Kochi, Japan on April 13, 1926. She graduated from middle school in 1943, then dropped out of high school to get away from her father, a gambler who worked as an agent for prostitutes. She moved to a new town and became a substitute teacher, and later married her coworker, a teacher named Kaoru Maeda, in 1944. They had a daughter and briefly moved to Manchuria. When World War II ended in 1945, the family was held in an internment camp until 1946, when they returned to Japan and lived with her husband's family in Kochi prefecture.

== Career ==
Miyao's writing career first gained attention when her short story "Ren" won the Fujin Kōron prize for new women writers in 1962. She then moved to Tokyo in 1966 and became a magazine editor. She continued writing for women's magazines and won the Osamu Dazai prize in 1974. Though she hated her father's profession, she wrote a story about it, Kantsubaki, and went on to win the Women's Literature Prize in 1977. She also won the Naoki prize for her novel Ichigen no koto in 1978. She went on to write prolifically throughout the rest of her career, winning several other awards such as the Kikuchi Kan prize and the Elan d'or. She was named a Person of Cultural Merit in 2008.

Miyao died on December 30, 2014.

== Style ==
Miyao's novels typically center around women going through hardship. She often writes about them compassionately and sensitively.

== Bibliography ==
- 櫂. Kai. 1972.
- Kantsubaki 寒椿. 1977.
- Ichigen no koto 一絃の琴. 1978.
- Kiryuin Hanako no Shogai 鬼龍院花子の生涯. 1980.
- Tenshoin Atsuhime 天璋院篤姫. 1984.
- Kikutei Yaozen no Hitobito 菊亭八百善の人びと. 1991.
- Kura 藏. 1993.
- Tofukumonin Masako no namida 東福門院和子の涙. 1993.
- Tengai no Hana 天涯の花. 1998.
