= Azuma Morisaki =

Japanese film director (1927–2020)

- Born: 19 November 1927; Nagasaki Prefecture, Japan
- Died: 16 July 2020 (aged 92); Chigasaki, Kanagawa
- Occupations: Film director, screenwriter

Azuma Morisaki (森崎 東, Morisaki Azuma; 19 November 1927 – 16 July 2020) was a Japanese film director and screenwriter.

== Career ==
Morisaki was born in Nagasaki Prefecture and graduated from Kyoto University. After editing the film magazine Jidai Eiga, he joined the Shochiku studio in 1956.

Moving from the Kyoto to Ofuna Studio, he wrote screenplays for Yoji Yamada's comedies and made his directorial debut in 1969 with Woman Can't Be Beaten. Known for his earthy, acerbic comedy, he also directed one episode of the Otoko wa Tsurai yo series. Turning freelance in 1975, he continued to make films. His last film, Pecoross' Mother and Her Days (2013), was made when he was 86 years old. He died on 16 July 2020 of a stroke at a hospital in Chigasaki, Kanagawa.

== Awards ==
Morisaki was given a best new artist award in the film category of the Agency for Cultural Affairs's Geijutsu Senshō art awards for 1970, and then received the Minister of Education's award in the 2004 Geijutsu Senshō. He also received a special grand award for his career at the 25th Yokohama Film Festival in 1994. Pecoross' Mother and Her Days was selected as the best film of 2013 in the critics' polls conducted by both the Kinema Junpo and Eiga Geijutsu magazines.

== Filmography ==
- Woman Can't Be Beaten (1969)
- Tora-san, His Tender Love (1970)
- Charming Men (1970)
- Follow the Girls (1971)
- Kigeki: Onna ikitemasu (1971)
- High-School Outcasts (1971)
- Umarekawatta Tamegorō (1972)
- Kigeki: Onna Uridashimasu (1972)
- Onna ikitemasu: Sakariba wataridori (1972)
- Ai Yori Aoku (1972–1973 TV series)
- Stray Dog (1973)
- Machi no Hi (1974)
- Comedy: Special Feature - Gigolo's Paradise aka Pimp Heaven (1975)
- Dark Magistrate (1975 TV series, 3 episodes)
- Hagure Keiji (1975 TV series)
- The Love and Adventures of Kuroki Taro (1977)
- Edo no Taka: Goyōbeya Hankachō (1978 TV series, 3 episodes)
- Tobe! Hissatsu ura goroshi (1978 TV series, 1 episode)
- Aokiōkami Narukichiomoase no Shōgai (1980, TV movie)
- Tennou no Ryouriban (1980 TV series, 1 episode)
- Time and Tide (1983)
- Location (1984)
- The Nuclear Gypsies (1985)
- Guys Who Never Learn (1987)
- The Great Department Store Robbery (1987)
- Kikyo (1988, TV movie)
- Dream Street (1989)
- Chihō Kisha Tachibana Yōsuke 1: Izu Shimoda Tsushinkyoku (1993, TV movie)
- Chihō Kisha Tachibana Yōsuke 2: Iga Ueno Tsushinkyoku (1993, TV movie)
- Tsuribaka Nisshi Special (1994)
- Oishinbo (1996)
- Love Letter (1998)
- Yonaoshi Kōmuin the Kōshōnin 1 (2002, TV movie)
- Chicken Is Barefoot (2004)
- Pecoross' Mother and Her Days (2013)

== Bibliography ==
- Morisaki, Azuma (2004). Atama wa Hitotsuzutsu Haikyūsarete Iru. Tokyo: Papirusu Ai. ISBN 478459101X. OCLC 169959171.
- Morisaki, Azuma (1984). Nippon no Kigeki Eiga. Tokyo: Eiga Shobō. OCLC 30388884.
- Fujii, Jinshi, ed. (2013). Morisaki Azuma-tō Sengen! = Azuma Morisaki: Films of Laughter, Tears, and Anger. Tokyo: Inscript. ISBN 978-4900997400.
