= Hideo Gosha =

Japanese film director (1929–1992)

- Born: Eiyū Gosha; February 26, 1929; Nishigahara, Tokyo Prefecture, Empire of Japan
- Died: August 30, 1992 (aged 63); Nishikyō-ku, Kyoto, Japan
- Education: Meiji University
- Occupations: Director; screenwriter
- Years active: 1959–1992
- Awards: Japan Academy Film Prize for Director of the Year (1984)

Hideo Gosha (Japanese: 五社 英雄, Hepburn: Gosha Hideo; February 26, 1929 – August 30, 1992) was a Japanese director and screenwriter. He was the first Japanese director to make the transition from television to theatrical films, and is best known for his jidaigeki and yakuza films. Beginning with Three Outlaw Samurai in 1964, Gosha directed 24 films in his career, including The Geisha (1983), which earned him the Japan Academy Film Prize for Director of the Year. His last, The Oil-Hell Murder, was released three months before his death in August 1992. His works have influenced directors such as Takashi Miike and Yoshiaki Kawajiri.

== Biography ==
Born in Nishigahara, Tokyo Prefecture (present-day Kita, Tokyo), Gosha graduated from high school and served in the Imperial Japanese Navy as an aviator during World War II. After earning a business degree at Meiji University, he joined Nippon Broadcasting System as a reporter in 1953. In 1957 he moved on to the newly founded Fuji Television and rose through the ranks as a producer and director. One of his television shows, the chambara Three Outlaw Samurai, so impressed the heads of the Shochiku film studio that he was offered the chance to adapt it as a feature film in 1964. Following this film's financial success, he directed a string of equally successful chambara productions through the end of the 1960s. His two most critical and popular successes of the period are Goyokin and Hitokiri (also known as Tenchu), both released in 1969 and both considered to be two of the finest examples of the chambara genre. In The Samurai Film, the first book-length study of the genre in English, film historian Alain Silver devoted an entire chapter to Gosha's work and noted that "Tenchu/Hitokiri may, with some justice, be cited as one of the most accomplished examples of the samurai genre since World War II."

During the 1970s, Gosha abandoned pure chambara and turned his productive energies toward films in the yakuza genre but he still produced period sword films such as The Wolves (1971), Bandits vs. Samurai Squadron (1978), and Hunter in the Dark (1979).

In 1979, Gosha's wife disappeared while leaving behind a large amount of debt. The following year, Gosha was arrested on suspicion of illegally possessing a handgun; he was released after being fined. Forced to leave Fuji TV, Gosha's first film as a freelancer was Onimasa. It was a commercial success, grossing two billion yen at the box office. By the early 1980s, Gosha began making period films with prostitutes as protagonists that featured realism, violence, and overt sexuality. The Geisha earned him the Japan Academy Film Prize for Director of the Year in 1984.

In 1985, the director founded Gosha Production. The following year, Yakuza Wives was a box office success that spawned what Mark Schilling called the most successful yakuza film series of 1980s.

== Filmography ==
=== Feature films ===
- 1964 Three Outlaw Samurai (三匹の侍, Sanbiki no Samurai)
- 1965 Sword of the Beast (獣の剣, Kedamono no Ken)
- 1966 Cash Calls Hell (五匹の紳士, Gohiki no Shinshi)
- 1966 The Secret of the Urn (丹下左膳 飛燕居合斬り, Tange Sazen Hien Iaigiri)
- 1966 Samurai Wolf (牙狼之介, Kiba Ōkaminosuke)
- 1967 Samurai Wolf II (牙狼之介 地獄斬り, Kiba Ōkaminosuke Jigoku Kiri)
- 1969 Goyokin (御用金, Goyōkin)
- 1969 Hitokiri (人斬り; a.k.a. Tenchu)
- 1971 The Wolves (出所祝い, Shussho Iwai)
- 1974 Violent Streets (暴力街, Bōryoku-gai)
- 1978 Bandits vs. Samurai Squadron (雲霧仁左衛門, Kumokiri Nizaemon)
- 1979 Hunter in the Dark (闇の狩人, Yami no Karyudo)
- 1982 Onimasa (鬼龍院花子の生涯, Kiryūin Hanako no Shōgai)
- 1983 The Geisha (陽暉楼, Yōkirō)
- 1984 Fireflies in the North (北の螢, Kita no Hotaru)
- 1985 Oar (櫂, Kai)
- 1985 Tracked (薄化粧, Usugeshō)
- 1986 Death Shadows (十手舞, Jittemai)
- 1986 Yakuza Wives (極道の妻たち, Gokudō no Onna-tachi)
- 1987 Tokyo Bordello (吉原炎上, Yoshiwara Enjō)
- 1988 Gate of Flesh (肉体の門, Nikutai no Mon; a.k.a. Carmen 1945)
- 1989 226 (a.k.a. Four Days of Snow and Blood)
- 1991 Heat Wave (陽炎, Kagerō)
- 1992 The Oil-Hell Murder (女殺油地獄, Onna Goroshi Abura no Jigoku)
