= Komatsu Kiyokado =

Japanese samurai

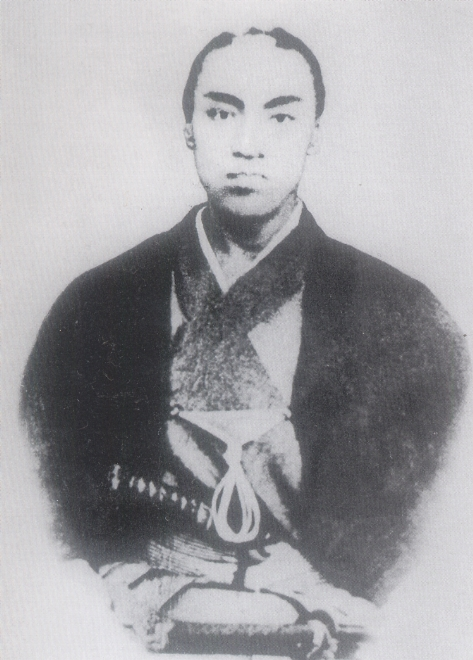
- Komatsu Kiyokado (Tatewaki)
- Born: December 3, 1835; Kagoshima, Satsuma Domain, Japan
- Died: August 16, 1870; Kagoshima, Japan
- Occupation: Karō of the Satsuma Domain

Komatsu Kiyokado (小松 清廉; December 3, 1835 – August 16, 1870) was a Japanese samurai of the late Edo period, who served the Shimazu clan of Satsuma, and went on to become a government official of the early Meiji period. He was also commonly known as Komatsu Tatewaki (小松帯刀). Komatsu ruled the fief of Yoshitoshi, which was a part of the Satsuma Domain. Appointed karō in 1862, he held high office in the Satsuma domain until its dissolution in 1871. Komatsu was also a descendant of the Sengoku-era samurai Nejime Shigenaga.

== Early life and adoption ==
Komatsu Tatewaki was born the third son of Kimotsuki Kaneyoshi of Kiire (5500 koku) who were high-ranking Satsuma retainers. His birth name was Kimotsuki Kaneshige He was adopted by Komatsu Kiyomichi as a young man and married Komatsu Ochika, and inherited the headship in 1856, immediately after his adoption and became Komatsu Kiyokado (Tatewaki)

== Satsuma career ==
Komatsu became a karō in the service of Shimazu Tadayoshi, the daimyō of Satsuma, in 1862. He was the official advocate of low-ranking men such as Ōkubo Toshimichi. He also helped shelter Sakamoto Ryōma.

== Meiji era ==
In the first few years of the Meiji era, Komatsu served as an official in the Imperial government.

== Later life and death ==
While in Kagoshima, Komatsu fell ill and died in 1870.

Before he died he wrote a letter to Okoto, his concubine in Kyoto, directing her to give their son Komatsu Kiyonao to his wife Ochika to be raised as the head of the Komatsu family. He was buried in the Komatsu family shrine beside both Ochika and Okoto. The Komatsu family shrine is located in the city of Hiyoki, known in modern-day as the Kagoshima Prefecture.

== Notes ==
Preceded by Komatsu Kiyomichi	28th Lord of Yoshitoshi (part of Satsuma domain); 1856-1870	Succeeded by Komatsu Kiyonao
