= 1971 in Japan =

- Decades: 1950s; 1960s; 1970s; 1980s; 1990s
- See also: Other events of 1971; History of Japan; Timeline; Years

Events in the year 1971 in Japan. It corresponds to Shōwa 46 (昭和46年) in the Japanese calendar.

== Incumbents ==
- Emperor: Hirohito
- Prime minister: Eisaku Satō (Liberal Democratic)
- Chief Cabinet Secretary: Shigeru Hori until July 5, Noboru Takeshita
- Chief Justice of the Supreme Court: Kazuto Ishida
- President of the House of Representatives: Naka Funada
- President of the House of Councillors: Yūzō Shigemune until July 17, Kenzō Kōno

=== Governors ===
- Aichi Prefecture: Mikine Kuwahara
- Akita Prefecture: Yūjirō Obata
- Aomori Prefecture: Shunkichi Takeuchi
- Chiba Prefecture: Taketo Tomonō
- Ehime Prefecture: Sadatake Hisamatsu (until 27 January); Haruki Shiraishi (starting 28 January)
- Fukui Prefecture: Heidayū Nakagawa
- Fukuoka Prefecture: Hikaru Kamei
- Fukushima Prefecture: Morie Kimura
- Gifu Prefecture: Saburō Hirano
- Gunma Prefecture: Konroku Kanda
- Hiroshima Prefecture: Iduo Nagano
- Hokkaido: Kingo Machimura (until 23 April); Naohiro Dōgakinai (starting 23 April)
- Hyogo Prefecture: Tokitada Sakai
- Ibaraki Prefecture: Nirō Iwakami
- Ishikawa Prefecture: Yōichi Nakanishi
- Iwate Prefecture: Tadashi Chida
- Kagawa Prefecture: Masanori Kaneko
- Kagoshima Prefecture: Saburō Kanemaru
- Kanagawa Prefecture: Bunwa Tsuda
- Kochi Prefecture: Masumi Mizobuchi
- Kumamoto Prefecture: Kōsaku Teramoto (until 10 February); Issei Sawada (starting 11 February)
- Kyoto Prefecture: Torazō Ninagawa
- Mie Prefecture: Satoru Tanaka
- Miyagi Prefecture: Sōichirō Yamamoto
- Miyazaki Prefecture: Hiroshi Kuroki
- Nagano Prefecture: Gon'ichirō Nishizawa
- Nagasaki Prefecture: Kan'ichi Kubo
- Nara Prefecture: Ryozo Okuda
- Niigata Prefecture: Shiro Watari
- Oita Prefecture: Kaoru Kinoshita (until 27 April); Masaru Taki (starting 28 April)
- Okayama Prefecture: Takenori Kato
- Osaka Prefecture: Gisen Satō (until 22 April); Ryōichi Kuroda (starting 23 April)
- Saga Prefecture: Sunao Ikeda
- Saitama Prefecture: Hiroshi Kurihara
- Shiga Prefecture: Kinichiro Nozaki
- Shiname Prefecture: Choemon Tanabe (until 29 April); Seiji Tsunematsu (starting 30 April)
- Shizuoka Prefecture: Yūtarō Takeyama
- Tochigi Prefecture: Nobuo Yokokawa
- Tokushima Prefecture: Yasunobu Takeichi
- Tokyo: Ryōkichi Minobe
- Tottori Prefecture: Jirō Ishiba
- Toyama Prefecture: Kokichi Nakada
- Wakayama Prefecture: Masao Ohashi
- Yamagata Prefecture: Tōkichi Abiko
- Yamaguchi Prefecture: Masayuki Hashimoto
- Yamanashi Prefecture: Kunio Tanabe

== Events ==
- January 2 – A ryokan fire in Wakayama kills 16 people and injures 15.
- March Unknown date – Nagase Upbright Cram School, as predecessor of Nagase Brothers Group was founded in Mitaka, Tokyo.
- March 4 – A Lake Kawaguchi to Otsuki local train collision with truck in Fujikyu Line, Fujiyoshida, Yamanashi Prefecture, according to Japan Transport Ministry official confirmed report, 17 person were lost to lives, with 69 person were wounded.
- April 1 – Apa Group founded, as predecessor name was Shinkin Developer in Komatsu, Ishikawa Prefecture.
- April 27 – A massive forest fire in Kure, Hiroshima Prefecture, according to Fire and Disaster Management Agency confirmed report, 18 firefighter were lost their lives.
- July 3 – Toa Domestic Airlines Flight 63 crash into Mount Yokotsu, Hakodate, Hokkaido, according to Japan Transport Ministry official confirmed report, all 68 person were lost to lives.
- July 18 – A heavy torrential rain, wide range affective landslide, debris flow, bridge collapse around Aioi and Sayo, Hyogo Prefecture, 19 person were lost to lives, 26 persons were wounded, according to Japan Fire and Disaster Management Agency official confirmed report.
- July 20 – A first McDonald's fast food outlet open in Japan at Ginza, Tokyo.
- July 30 – An All Nippon Airways Boeing 727 collides with a Japanese fighter jet, resulting in a loss of 162 lives.
- October 25 – Collision of two limited express trains on the Kintetsu Osaka Line in Hakusan (now Tsu) in Mie Prefecture. Casualties include 25 dead and 227 wounded.
- November 11 – A slope failure field site collapsed during an experiment in Tama-ku, Kawasaki, Kanagawa Prefecture. According to a Japan Fire and Disaster Management Agency confirmed report, 15 persons lost their lives, 10 persons were wounded.

== Births ==
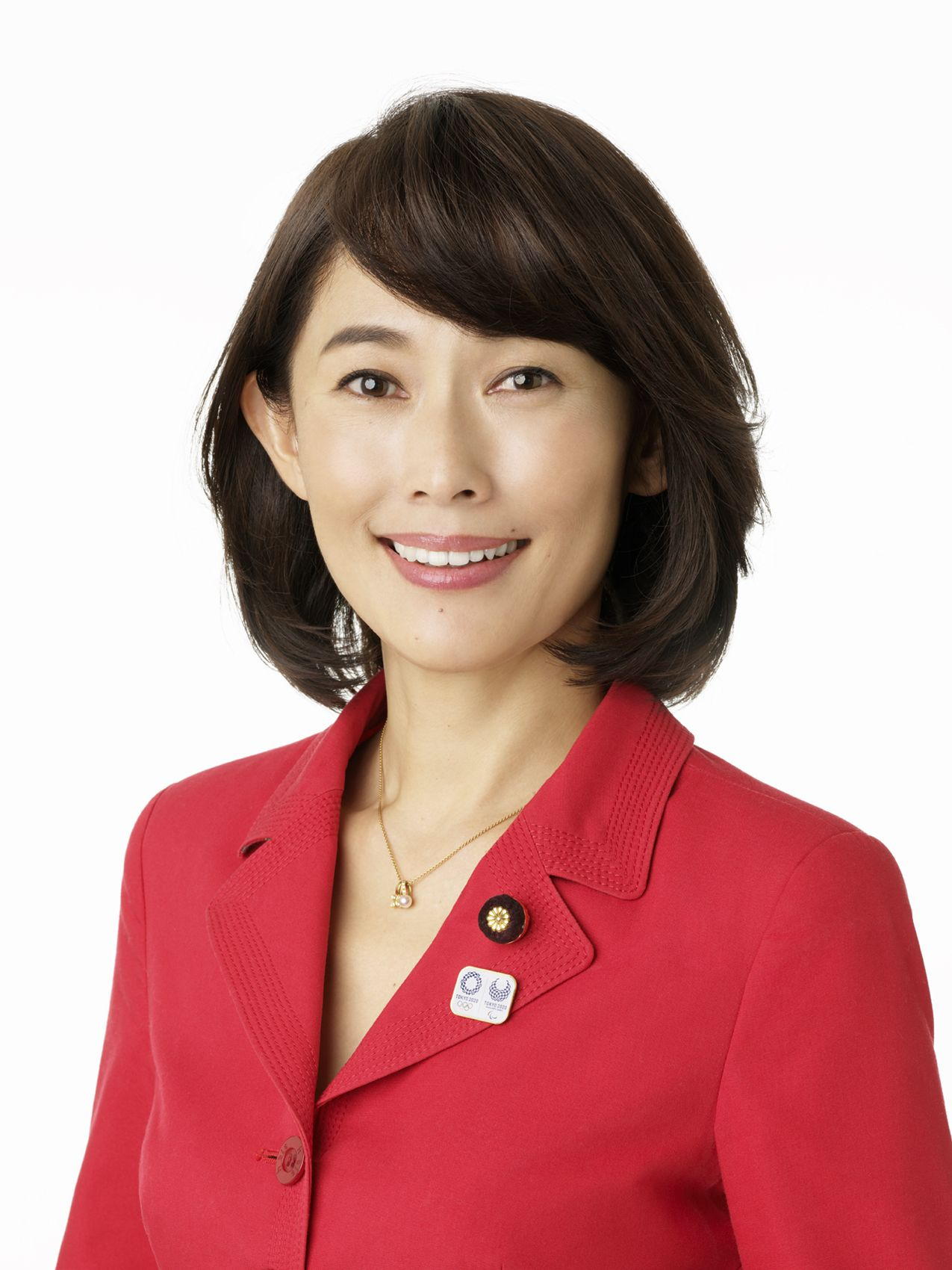
Tamayo Marukawa

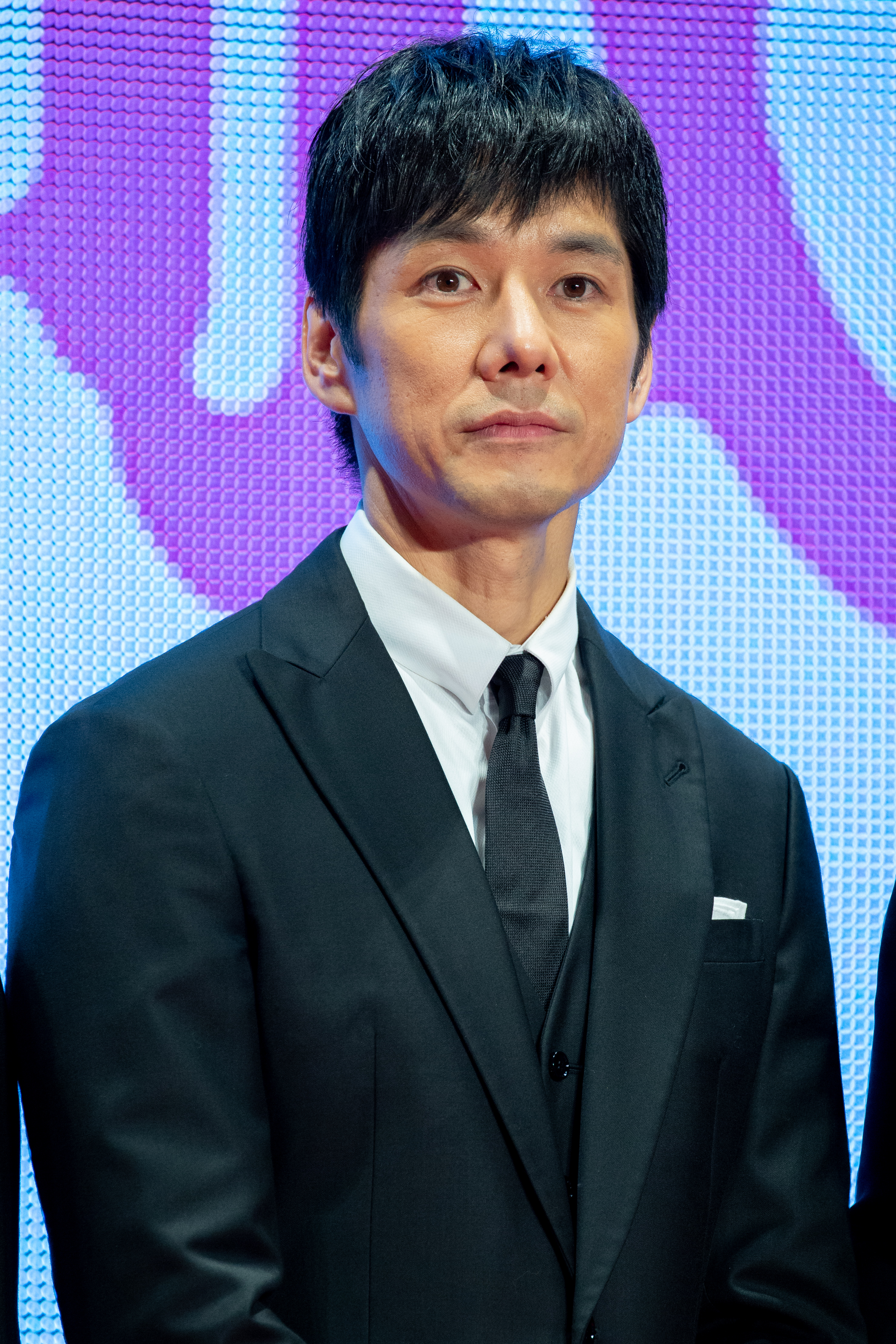
Hidetoshi Nishijima

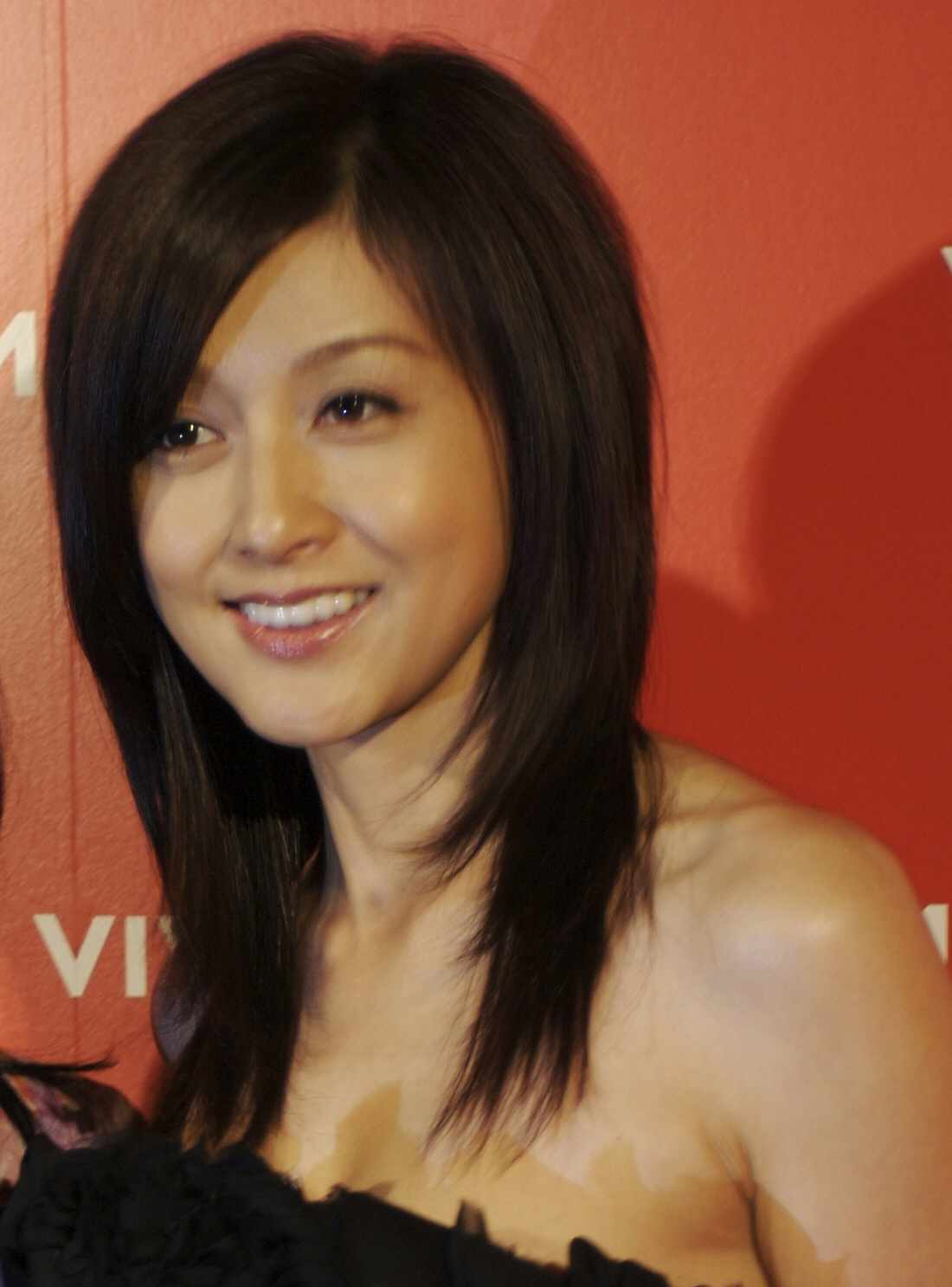
Norika Fujiwara

- January 2 – Yutaka Takenouchi, actor
- January 4
  - Junichi Kakizaki, botanist and floral designer
  - Hiroyuki Sato, professional baseball player
  - Futoshi Yamabe, professional baseball player
- January 5 – Mayuko Takata, actress
- January 6 – Mitsuru Manaka, professional baseball player
- January 8 – Kenjiro Kawasaki, professional baseball player
- January 17 – Youki Kudo, actress
- January 18 – Junko Furuta, torture and murder victim (d. 1989)
- January 19 – Tamayo Marukawa, politician, cabinet minister, representative and former TV announcer
- January 20 – Masaru Hanada, sumo, 66th generation Yokozuna
- January 23
  - Kaori Kawamura, singer (d. 2009)
  - Akira Ota, professional baseball player
- January 27 – Tomoefuji Toshihide, sumo,
- January 31 – Yasuo Manaka, soccer player
- February 2 – Kiyoshi Toyoda, former professional baseball pitcher
- February 14
  - Risa Hirako, model
  - Noriko Sakai, pop singer and actress
- February 22 – Etsuko Kozakura, voice actress
- March 2 – Manami Toyota, professional wrestler
- March 4 – Satoshi Motoyama, professional racing driver
- March 6 – Maguro Fujita, manga artist
- March 10
  - Ryu Fujisaki, manga artist
  - Tsubuyaki Shirō, comedian
- March 13 – Tsutomu Nishino, football player
- March 15 – Risa Junna, actress and singer
- March 16 – Tae Kimura, actress
- March 17 – Masataka Gōda, professional shogi player
- March 20 – Shinichiro Ohta, voice actor and TV announcer
- March 24 – Shinichi Hatori, free announcer, tarento, and TV presenter
- March 26 – Moyoco Anno, manga artist
- March 29
  - Shizuka Ishikawa, voice actress
  - Hidetoshi Nishijima, actor
- April 2
  - Makoto Hasegawa, basketball player
  - Cunning Takeyama comedian and actor.
  - Zeebra, rapper
- April 5
  - Takami Itō, author
  - Ayako Nishikawa, cosmetic surgeon
- April 8 – Yoshinobu Ohga, musician
- April 12 – Takako Katō, basketball player
- April 18 – Junya Ogawa, politician
- April 22 – Daisuke Enomoto, would-be first Japanese space tourist
- April 23 – Shigetoshi Hasebe, football player and manager
- April 26 – Naoki Tanaka, comedian, actor and presenter
- May 2
  - Musashimaru Kōyō, sumo wrestler
  - Shu Takumi, creator of Ace Attorney
- May 3 – Ryo Kawano, baseball player
- May 9 – Hiroki Azuma, cultural critic, novelist, and philosopher
- May 11 – Tsutomu Iwamoto, former professional baseball pitcher
- May 12
  - Kayoko Okubo, comedian, tarento and actress
  - Nao Nagasawa, voice actress
- May 14 – Takashi Kashiwada, baseball player
- May 20 – Yasuko Mitsuura, comedian
- May 21 – Yoshikazu Mera, countertenor
- May 24 – Taizō Mikazuki, politician and governor
- May 25 – Kōtarō Isaka, author
- May 26 – Takuro, musician
- May 28 – Miho Otani, JMSDF officer
- June 5
  - Miyuki Komatsu, actress
  - Tomoko Nakajima, actress
- June 8 – Teru, musician and singer
- June 10 – Tadashi Nakamura, footballer
- June 11 – Kenjiro Tsuda, voice actor
- June 14 – Ken Maeda, comedian, impressionist, and actor
- June 18 – Yoshiyuki Shinoda, footballer and manager
- June 23 – Katsuhiro Maeda, baseball player
- June 24 – Toshihiro Noguchi, baseball player
- June 27 – Shizuka Ochi, actress
- June 28 – Norika Fujiwara, actress and television personality
- June 29 – Junko Noda, voice actress
- July 1 – Yusuke Torigoe, baseball player
- July 17 – Ritsuko Tanaka, actress and singer.
- July 19 – Naoki Soma, footballer
- July 23 – Noriko Mizoguchi, judoka
- July 24 – Tetsuji Nakamura, politician
- July 26 – Kazuki Sakuraba, author
- August 25 – Ayumi Miyazaki, singer
- September 2 – Fumie Hosokawa, actress
- September 7 – Tomomi Okazaki, speed skater
- September 10 – Tomo Sakurai, voice actress (d. 2025)
- September 12 – Atsuko Wakai, karateka
- October 1 – Tatsuya Ide, baseball player
- October 4 – Toshihisa Nishi, former professional baseball player
- October 6 – GaaSyy, businessman and politician
- October 8 – Hiroki Kokubo, baseball player
- October 25 – Midori Gotō, violinist
- November 12 – Yasuo Aiuchi, snowboarder
- November 29 – Naoko Mori, actress
- December 2 – Mine Yoshizaki, Manga artist
- December 28 – Machiko Toyoshima, voice actress
- December 30 – Daisuke Motoki, former professional baseball player

== Deaths ==
- February 26 – Yahei Miura, athlete (b. 1891)
- April 20 – Hyakken Uchida, author, writer and academic (b. 1889)
- October 6 – Hankyu Sasaki, admiral (b. 1896)
- October 21 – Naoya Shiga, novelist and short story writer (b. 1883)

== See also ==
- 1971 in Japanese football
- 1971 in Japanese television
- List of Japanese films of 1971
- 1971 in Japanese music
