= List of Japanese films of 1971 =

A list of films released in Japan in 1971 (see 1971 in film).

Japanese films released in 1971
Title	Director	Cast	Genre	Notes
3000 kiro no wana	Jun Fukuda	Jiro Tamiya, Mie Hama, Kaori Taniguchi	—	
Ame wa shitte ita	Michio Yamamoto	Keiko Torii, Yoko Minamikaze, Toshio Kurosawa	—	
Animal Treasure Island	Hiroshi Ikeda	Minori Matsushima, Asao Koike, Hitoshi Takagi	Anime	Adapted from Robert Louis Stevenson's Treasure Island
Apartment Wife: Affair In the Afternoon	Shōgorō Nishimura	Kazuko Shirakawa	—	
Atakku No.1–Namida no fuschichyo	Fumio Kurokawa	—	—	Animated feature film
The Battle of Okinawa	Kihachi Okamoto	Keiju Kobayashi, Tetsuro Tamba, Tatsuya Nakadai	War	
Beat '71	Toshiya Fujita	Meiko Kaji, Takeo Chii, Yoshio Inaba	—	
Castle Orgies	Isao Hayashi	Setsuko Ogawa	—	
Chimimoryo: A Soul of Demons	Ko Nakahara	Akaji Maro, Hiroko Ogi, Kazuko Ineno	—	
Choeki Taro: Mamushi no Kyodai				
The Ceremony	Nagisa Oshima	Kenzo Kawarasaki, Kei Satō, Atsuko Kaku		
Coed Report: Yuko's White Breasts	Yukihiko Kondo	Yuko Katagiri	—	
Damasarete noraiurasu	Takashi Tsuboshima	Hitoshi Ueki, Hajime Hana, Cha Kato	—	
Dare no tame ni aisuruka	Masanobu Deme	Wakako Sakai, Yūzō Kayama, Mitsuko Mori	—	
Emperor Tomato Ketchup	Shuji Terayama	Goro Abashiri, Tarō Apollo, Shiro Demaemochi		
Futari dake no asa	Takeshi Matsumori	Yusuke Okada, Shiro Mifune, Ryoko Nakano	—	
Gamera vs. Zigra	Noriaki Yuasa	Gloria Zoellner, Arlene Zoellner, Koji Fujiyama	—	
Go! Go! Kamen Rider	Hidetoshi Kitamura	Hiroshi Fujioka	Tokusatsu	Movie version of Kamen Rider episode 13
Godzilla vs. Hedorah	Yoshimitsu Banno	Akira Yamauchi, Toshie Kimura, Hiroyuki Kawase	—	
Hajimete no tabi	Shiro Moritani	Yusuke Okada, Choei Takahashi, Kazuyo Mori	—	
Hashire! Kotaro-Otoko dakara nakusa	Kunihiko Yamamoto	Shunji Fujimura, Chigusa Go, Tonpei Hidari	Comedy	
Hibari no subete	Umetsugu Inoue	Hibari Misora, Takahiro Tamura, Kazuro Nakagawa	Documentary	
Inakappe taisho	Hiroshi Sasagawa	—	—	Animated short film
Inakappe taisho–Neko no arukeba suzume ni ataru dasu–Ataru mo ataru mo toki no un dasu	Hiroshi Sasagawa	—	—	
Inn of Evil	Masaki Kobayashi	Kanemon Nakamura, Komaki Kurihara, Kei Satō	—	
Kaette kita Urutoraman	Yoshiharu Tomita	Jiro Dan, Shin Kishida, Nobuo Tsukamoto	—	
Kaette kita Urutoraman–Tatsumaki kaiju no kyofu	Kauzo Sagawa	Jiro Dan, Shin Kishida, Nobuo Tsukamoto	—	
Kamui gaiden	Kesuke Kondo	—	Documentary	Animated film
Kaoyaku				
Keiji monogatari–Kyodai no okite	Shun Inagaki	Kunie Tanaka, Yūzō Kayama, Senri Kurihara	—	
Kigeki Omedetai yatsu	Kobako Hanato	Kon Omura, Hiroshi Tachibana, Tadao Takashima	Comedy	
Kigeki Kinow no teki wa kyo mo teki	Yoichi Maeda	Masaaki Sakai, Chosuke Ikariya, Kyoko Yoshizawa	—	
Kigeki San oku en saisakusen	Katsushin Ishida	Jiro Tamiya, Norihei Miki, Haruko Wanibuchi	Comedy	
Kitsune no kureta akanbo				
Koibitotte yabasete	Kunihiko Watanabe	Kyoko Yoshizawa, Isao Natsuyagi, Hiroshi Ishikawa	—	
Konchyu monogatari–Minashigo Hattchi–Otsuki sama no mama	Ippei Kuri	—	—	Animated short film
Konchyu monogatari–Minashigo Hattchi–Wassure nagosa ni negai o komete	Kihei Tomino	—	—	Animated short
Lake of Dracula	Michio Yamamoto	Midori Fujita, Sanae Emi, Choei Takahashi	Horror	
Maboroshi no satsui	Tadashi Sawajima	Keiju Kobayashi, Ayako Wakao, Kankuro Nakamura	—	
Macchi uro no shyojo	Kazuhiko Watanabe	—	—	Short puppet animation
Minamata: The Victims and Their World	Noriaki Tsuchimoto		Documentary	
Muumin	Masaaki Osumi	—	—	Animated short film
Nippon ichi no shokku otoko	Takashi Tsuboshima	Hitoshi Ueki, Wakako Sakai, Kei Tani	—	
Okite koronde mata okite	Yoichi Maeda	Masaaki Sakai, Chosuke Ikariya, Kyoko Yoshizawa	—	
Okusama wa 18 sai–Shinkon kyoshitsu	Kunihiko Yamamoto	Yuki Okazaki, Tetsuo Ishidate, Jo Shishido	—	
Onna no hanamichi	Tadashi Sawajima	Hibari Misora, Takahiro Tamura, Kazuo Nakagawa	—	
Saredo warera ga hibi–Wakare no uta	Shiro Moritani	Tomoko Ogawa, Takashi Yamaguchi, Midori Fujita	—	
Shiosai	Shiro Moritani	Itsuto Asahina, Midori Onozato, Miki Odagiri	—	
Showa hitoketa shacho tai futaketa shacho–Getsu Getsu Ka Sui Moku Kin Kin	Katsushin Ishida	Keiju Kobayashi, Wakako Sakai, Eijirō Tōno	—	
Showa hitoketa shacho tai futaketa shacho	Katsushin Ishida	Keiju Kobayashi, Wakako Sakai, Toshio Kurosawa	—	
Silence	Masahiro Shinoda	Shima Iwashita, Tetsuro Tamba, David Lampson	—	
Sogoi yatsura	Kiyoshi Nakamura	Yosuke Natsuki, Toshio Kurosawa, Reiko Dan	—	
A Soul to Devils	Ko Nakahira	Nobuko Tashiro	Drama	Entered into the 1971 Cannes Film Festival
Swords of Death	Tomu Uchida	Kinnosuke Yorozuya, Rentarō Mikuni, Hideko Okiyama	—	
Sympathy for the Underdog	Kinji Fukasaku	Kōji Tsuruta, Noboru Ando	Crime	
To Love Again	Kon Ichikawa	Renaud Verley, Ruriko Asaoka, Tetsuo Ishidate	—	
Tora-san's Shattered Romance	Yoji Yamada	Kiyoshi Atsumi	Comedy	6th in the Otoko wa Tsurai yo series
Tora-san, the Good Samaritan	Yoji Yamada	Kiyoshi Atsumi	Comedy	7th in the Otoko wa Tsurai yo series
Tora-san's Love Call	Yoji Yamada	Kiyoshi Atsumi	Comedy	8th in the Otoko wa Tsurai yo series
The Wolves	Hideo Gosha	Tatsuya Nakadai, Noboru Ando, Toshio Kurosawa	Crime	
Young Guy, The Ace Rider	Katsumi Iwauchi	Yūzō Kayama, Shigeru Oya, Kunie Tanaka	—	
Yuhi-kun–Sarariiman oashutsu	Tsugunobu Kotani	Osami Nabe, Junzaburo Ban, Hiroko Nori	—	
Zatoichi Meets the One Armed Swordsman	Kimiyoshi Yasuda	Shintaro Katsu, Jimmy Wang Yu, Yuko Hamada	—	Japanese-Hong Kong co-production

== See also ==
- 1971 in Japan
- 1971 in Japanese television

== Footnotes ==
=== References ===
- Galbraith IV, Stuart (1994). Japanese Science Fiction, Fantasy and Horror Films. McFarland. ISBN 0-89950-853-7.
- Galbraith IV, Stuart (1996). The Japanese Filmography: 1900 through 1994. McFarland. ISBN 0-7864-0032-3.
- Galbraith IV, Stuart (2008). The Toho Studios Story: A History and Complete Filmography. Scarecrow Press. ISBN 978-1461673743.
