= Aiuchi =

Aiuchi (written: 愛内 or 相内) is a Japanese surname. Notable people with the surname include:

- Rina Aiuchi (愛内 里菜, born 1980), Japanese singer and songwriter
- Yasuo Aiuchi (相内 康夫, born 1971), Japanese snowboarder
