= Tsutomu =

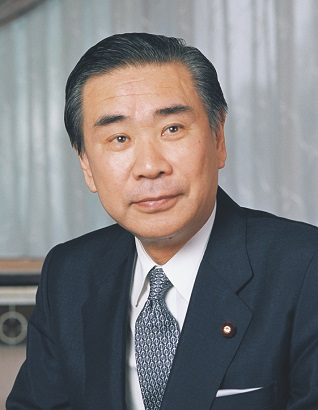
- Tsutomu Hata (1935–2017), Japanese politician and Prime Minister of Japan
- Pronunciation: tsɯtomɯ (IPA)
- Gender: Male

Origin
- Origin: Japanese
- Meaning: Different meanings depending on the kanji used

Other names
- Alternative spelling: Tutomu (Kunrei-shiki) Tutomu (Nihon-shiki) Tsutomu (Hepburn)

Tsutomu is a masculine Japanese given name.

== Written forms ==
Tsutomu' can be written using different kanji characters. Here are some examples:

- 勉, "make effort"
- 務, "affairs"
- 勤, "diligence"
- 努, "strive"
- 力, "power"

The name can also be written in hiragana つとむ or katakana ツトム.

== Notable people with the name ==
- Tsutomu Adachi (あだち 勉; 1947–2004), Japanese manga artist
- Tsutomu Akinaga (秋永 力; 1894–1978), Japanese general in the Imperial Japanese Army
- Tsutomu Aragaki (新垣 勉; born 1952), Japanese tenor
- Tsutomu Chida (千田 務; born 1950), former Japanese shihan
- Tsutomu Fujimura (藤村 勉; born 1982), Japanese Greco-Roman wrestler
- Tsutomu Hanabusa (英 勉), Japanese film director
- Tsutomu Hanahara (花原 勉; born 1940), Japanese wrestler
- Tsutomu Hanzawa (榛沢 務; born 1948), Japanese ice hockey player
- Tsutomu Hata (羽田 孜; 1935–2017), Japanese politician and Prime Minister of Japan
- Tsutomu Hirose (広瀬 務; born 1963), Japanese rugby union player
- Tsutomu Irie (入江 勉; born 1948), Japanese professional golfer
- Tsutomu Isa (伊佐 勉; born 1969), Japanese head coach of the Sun Rockers Shibuya
- Tsutomu Isobe (磯部 勉; born 1950), Japanese actor and voice actor
- Tsutomu Itō (伊東 勤; born 1962), Japanese former manager
- Tsutomu Iwamoto (岩本 勉; born 1971), Japanese former Nippon Professional Baseball pitcher
- Tsutomu Kashiwakura (カシワクラ ツトム; born 1966), Japanese voice actor
- Tsutomu Kawabuchi (河渕 務; 1925–2014), Japanese ice hockey player, coach and administrator
- Tsutomu Kawasaki (川崎 努; born 1969), Japanese short track speed skater
- Tsutomu Katsuki (香月 勗; 1946–2014), Japanese organic chemist
- Tsutomu Kitade (北出 勉; born 1976), Japanese football player
- Tsutomu Kitagawa (喜多川 務; born 1957), Japanese actor and stuntman
- Tsutomu Koyama (小山 勉; 1936–2012), Japanese volleyball player
- Tsutomu Minakami (水上 勉; 1919–2004), Japanese writer
- Tsutomu Miura (三浦 つとむ; 1911-1989), Japanese linguist
- Tsutomu Miyasaka (宮坂 力; born 1953), Japanese engineer
- Tsutomu Miyazaki (宮﨑 勤; 1962-2008), Japanese cannibalistic serial killer and necrophile
- Tsutomu Mitsudome (満留 勉; 1914-1945), Japanese rower
- Tsutomu Mizushima (水島 努; born 1965), Japanese animation and sound director
- Tsutomu Nakano (中野 勉; born 1973), Japanese freestyle swimmer
- Tsutomu Nagata (永田 務; born 1984), Japanese Paralympic athlete
- Tsutomu Nihei (弐瓶 勉; born 1971), Japanese manga artist
- Tsutomu Nishino (西野 努; born 1971), Japanese football player
- Tsutomu Nishioka (西岡 力; born 1956), Japanese professor of International Christian Studies
- Tsutomu Ogura (小倉 勉; born 1966), Japanese footballer and manager
- Tsutomu Ohshima (大島 劼; born 1930), Japanese master of Shotokan karate
- Tsutomu Oosugi (大杉 勉; born 1985), Japanese professional wrestler
- Tsutomu Okabori (岡堀 勉; born 1957), Japanese former cyclist
- Tsutomu Okubo (大久保 勉; born 1961), Japanese politician
- Tsutomu Sakamoto (坂本 勉; born 1962), Japanese racing cyclist
- Tsutomu Sakuma (佐久間 勉; 1879–1910), Japanese career naval officer
- Tsutomu Sato (politician) (佐藤 勉; born 1952), Japanese politician
- Tsutomu Sato (ophthalmologist) (1902–1960), Japanese ophthalmologist
- Tsutomu Sato (windsurfer) (佐藤 務; born 1960), Japanese windsurfer
- Tsutomu Seki (関 勉; born 1930), Japanese astronomer
- Tsutomu Sekido (関戸 力; 1915–1987), Japanese alpine
- Tsutomu Sekine (関根 勤; born 1953), Japanese comedian and television presenter
- Tsutomu Shibayama (芝山 努; born 1941), Japanese anime director
- Tsutomu Shimomura (下村 努; born 1964), Japanese-born American physicist and computer security expert
- Tsutomu Sonobe (園部 勉; born 1958), Japanese football player
- Tsutomu Takahashi (高橋 ツトム; born 1965), Japanese manga artist
- Tsutomu Takahata (高畠 勉; born 1968), Japanese former football
- Tsutomu Takebe (武部 勤; born 1941), Japanese secretary general of Japan's Liberal Democratic Party
- Tsutomu Tanaka (田中 勉; born 1939), Japanese baseball player
- Tsutomu Tomioka (冨岡 勉; born 1948), Japanese doctor and politician
- Tsutomu Tomita (冨田 務; born 1943), Japanese president of Fuji Speedway
- Tsutomu Wakamatsu (若松 勉; born 1947), Japanese former baseball player, coach, and manager
- Tsutomu Yamaguchi (山口 彊; 1916–2010), Japanese marine engineer
- Tsutomu Yamazaki (山崎 努; born 1936), Japanese actor
- Tsutomu Yanagida (柳田 勉; born 1949), Japanese physicist
- Tsutomu Yukawa (湯川 勉; 1911–1942), Japanese aikidoka
- Tsutomu Ōhashi (大橋 力; born 1933), Japanese artist and scientist
- Tsutomu Ōyokota (大横田 勉; 1913–1970), Japanese freestyle swimmer

== Fictional characters ==
- Tsutomu Goshiki (五色 工), a character from the manga and anime Haikyu!! with the position of wing spiker from Shiratorizawa Academy
- Tsutomu Ryuuzaki (竜崎 勤), a character from Tenjo Tenge

== See also ==
- 7713 Tsutomu
- Tsutomu Kanai Award
