= List of submissions to the 52nd Academy Awards for Best Foreign Language Film =

1979 Best Foreign Language Film submissions

Highlights
- Oscar winner: (West Germany) The Tin Drum
- Submissions: 23
- Debuts: 1

This is a list of submissions to the 52nd Academy Awards for Best Foreign Language Film. The Academy Award for Best Foreign Language Film was created in 1956 by the Academy of Motion Picture Arts and Sciences to honour non-English-speaking films produced outside the United States. The award is handed out annually, and is accepted by the winning film's director, although it is considered an award for the submitting country as a whole. Countries are invited by the Academy to submit their best films for competition according to strict rules, with only one film being accepted from each country.

For the 52nd Academy Awards, twenty-three films were submitted in the category Academy Award for Best Foreign Language Film. China submitted a film for the first time. The five nominated films came from France, Italy, Poland, Spain.

West Germany won for the first time with The Tin Drum by Volker Schlöndorff.

== Submissions ==
Submitting country	Film title used in nomination	Original title	Language(s)	Director(s)	Result
Argentina	The Island	La isla	Spanish	Alejandro Doria	Not nominated
Austria	Tales from the Vienna Woods	Geschichten aus dem Wienerwald	German	Maximilian Schell	Not nominated
Belgium	Woman in a Twilight Garden	Een vrouw tussen hond en wolf	Dutch	André Delvaux	Not nominated
Bulgaria	The Barrier	Бариерата	Bulgarian	Christo Christov	Not nominated
Canada	A Scream from Silence	Mourir à tue-tête	French	Anne Claire Poirier	Not nominated
China	Effendi	阿凡提	Mandarin	Lang Xiao	Not nominated
Czechoslovakia	Those Wonderful Men With A Crank	Báječní muži s klikou	Czech	Jiří Menzel	Not nominated
Denmark	Johnny Larsen		Danish	Morten Arnfred	Not nominated
Egypt	Alexandria... Why?	إسكندرية... ليه؟	Arabic	Youssef Chahine	Not nominated
France	A Simple Story	Une histoire simple	French, English	Claude Sautet	Nominated
West Germany	The Tin Drum	Die Blechtrommel	German	Volker Schlöndorff	Won Academy Award
Hong Kong	Raining in the Mountain	空山灵雨	Mandarin	King Hu	Not nominated
Hungary	Angi Vera		Hungarian	Pál Gábor	Not nominated
Israel	Moments	רגעים	Hebrew, French	Michal Bat-Adam	Not nominated
Italy	To Forget Venice	Dimenticare Venezia	Italian	Franco Brusati	Nominated
Japan	Gassan	月山	Japanese	Tetsutaro Murano	Not nominated
Netherlands	A Woman Like Eve	Een Vrouw als Eva	Dutch, English	Nouchka van Brakel	Not nominated
Poland	The Maids of Wilko	Panny z Wilka	Polish	Andrzej Wajda	Nominated
Soviet Union	Autumn Marathon	Осенний марафон	Russian	Georgiy Daneliya	Not nominated
Spain	Mama Turns A Hundred	Mamá cumple cien años	Spanish	Carlos Saura	Nominated
Sweden	A Respectable Life	Ett anständigt liv	Swedish	Stefan Jarl	Not nominated
Switzerland	Les petites fugues		French	Yves Yersin	Not nominated
Yugoslavia	The Man to Destroy	Čovjek koga treba ubiti	Serbo-Croatian	Veljko Bulajić	Not nominated

== Sources ==
- Margaret Herrick Library, Academy of Motion Picture Arts and Sciences
