= Fuji sanchō =

1970 film directed by Tetsutaro Murano

- DVD cover
- Directed by: Tetsutaro Murano
- Screenplay by: Takeo Kunihiro
- Based on: Jirō Nitta "Fuji sanchō"
- Produced by: Yūjirō Ishihara
- Starring: Yūjirō Ishihara; Tetsuya Watari; Tsutomu Yamazaki; Jukichi Uno; Shigeru Tsuyuguchi; Makoto Sato; Etsuko Ichihara; Shintaro Katsu
- Cinematography: Mitsuji Kanau
- Music by: Ichirō Higo; Toshiro Mayuzumi
- Production company: Ishihara Promotion
- Distributed by: Nikkatsu
- Release date: February 28, 1970 (Japan)
- Running time: 126 minutes
- Country: Japan
- Language: Japanese

Fuji sanchō (Japanese: 富士山頂), also known as The Summit of Mt. Fuji, is a 1970 Japanese film directed by Tetsutaro Murano. based on Jirō Nitta`s novel of the same title. The film depicts the construction of Mount Fuji Radar System on the top of Mount Fuji.

== Cast ==
- Yūjirō Ishihara as Gorō Umehara
- Tetsuya Watari as Youhei Kada
- Tsutomu Yamazaki as Takeshi Ishizuka
- Ichirō Nakatani as Okada
- Shinsuke Ashida as Tatsukichi
- Makoto Sato as Morita
- Eijirō Tōno
- Kunie Tanaka
- Takeshi Katō
- Shigeru Kōyama
- Ben Hiura as A young man
- Akira Yamauchi as Nakabayashi
- Mizuho Suzuki as Uchimura
- Shigeru Tsuyuguchi as Tomizawa
- Etsuko Ichihara as Shigeko
- Mitsuo Hamada
- Masao Shimizu as Isayama
- Yuriko Hoshi as Mitsuko
- Jukichi Uno as Muraoki
- Shintaro Katsu as Asakichi
