= 1971 in Japanese football =

1971 season

Japanese football in 1971

== Japan Soccer League ==
Pos	Team	Pld	W	D	L	GF	GA	GD	Pts	Qualification
1	Yanmar Diesel	14	9	4	1	32	13	+19	22	Champions
2	Mitsubishi Motors	14	7	4	3	32	12	+20	18	
3	Nippon Steel	14	8	2	4	34	23	+11	18	
4	Hitachi	14	7	4	3	18	17	+1	18	
5	Furukawa Electric	14	5	5	4	24	24	0	15	
6	Toyo Industries	14	3	4	7	11	17	−6	10	
7	Nippon Kokan	14	2	4	8	11	23	−12	8	To promotion/relegation series
8	Nagoya Mutual Bank	14	0	3	11	10	43	−33	3	To promotion/relegation series

== Emperor's Cup ==
January 1, 1972

Mitsubishi Motors	3–1	Yanmar Diesel
? (?) ? (?) ? (?)		? (?)

National Stadium

== National team ==
=== Results ===
1971.07.28	Japan	2–3	Denmark	Copenhagen, Denmark
	Kamamoto 35', 55'	JFA	? (?) ? (?) ? (?)

1971.08.13	Japan	2–0	Iceland	Reykjavík, Iceland
	Sugiyama 64', 66'	JFA		Attendance: 5,847

1971.09.23	Japan	0–3	Malaysia	Seoul, South Korea
		JFA	? (?) ? (?) ? (?)	Attendance: 15,000

1971.09.27	Japan	8–1	Philippines	Seoul, South Korea
	Ogi 9', 41'; Kamamoto 12', 53', 73'; Tomizawa 42', 44'; Yoshimura 61'	JFA	? (?)	Attendance: 8,000

1971.09.29	Japan	5–1	Chinese Taipei	Seoul, South Korea
	Kamamoto 14', 71', 81'; Yoshimura 48'; T. Miyamoto 61'	JFA	? (?)	Attendance: 5,000

1971.10.02	Japan	1–2	South Korea	Seoul, South Korea
	Nagai 52'	JFA	? (?) ? (?)	Attendance: 30,000

=== Players statistics ===
Player	-1970	07.28	08.13	09.23	09.27	09.29	10.02	1971	Total
Teruki Miyamoto	52(18)	O	O	O	O	O(1)	O	6(1)	58(19)
Ryuichi Sugiyama	50(13)	O	O(2)	O	O	O	O	6(2)	56(15)
Masakatsu Miyamoto	40(1)	-	-	O	O	O	O	4(0)	44(1)
Aritatsu Ogi	36(7)	O	O	-	O(2)	O	O	5(2)	41(9)
Yoshitada Yamaguchi	35(0)	O	O	O	O	O	O	6(0)	41(0)
Kenzo Yokoyama	34(0)	O	O	O	O	O	O	6(0)	40(0)
Hiroshi Katayama	33(0)	O	-	O	O	O	O	5(0)	38(0)
Takaji Mori	30(1)	O	O	-	-	-	O	3(0)	33(1)
Kunishige Kamamoto	27(31)	O(2)	O	O	O(3)	O(3)	O	6(8)	33(39)
Yoshio Kikugawa	14(0)	O	O	-	-	-	-	2(0)	16(0)
Tadahiko Ueda	10(7)	O	O	O	-	-	-	3(0)	13(7)
Kozo Arai	6(0)	-	-	O	O	O	O	4(0)	10(0)
Kiyoshi Tomizawa	6(0)	-	-	O	O(2)	-	O	3(2)	9(2)
Nelson Yoshimura	4(1)	O	O	O	O(1)	O(1)	O	6(2)	10(3)
Nobuo Kawakami	4(0)	O	-	-	-	-	-	1(0)	5(0)
Takeshi Ono	1(0)	O	O	-	-	-	-	2(0)	3(0)
Yoshikazu Nagai	0(0)	-	O	-	O	O	O(1)	4(1)	4(1)
Seiichi Sakiya	0(0)	-	-	-	O	O	-	2(0)	2(0)
Atsuyoshi Furuta	0(0)	-	O	-	-	-	-	1(0)	1(0)
Michio Ashikaga	0(0)	-	-	O	-	-	-	1(0)	1(0)
Nobuo Fujishima	0(0)	-	-	-	-	O	-	1(0)	1(0)

== Births ==
- 19 July: Naoki Soma
