= Zoom In: Rape Apartments =

- Theatrical poster
- Directed by: Naosuke Kurosawa
- Written by: Chiho Katsurako
- Produced by: Yoshihisa Nakagawa
- Starring: Erina Miyai; Yōko Azusa
- Cinematography: Masaru Mori
- Edited by: Atsushi Nabeshima
- Music by: Shin Takada
- Distributed by: Nikkatsu (Japan)
- Release date: March 15, 1980
- Running time: 68 min.
- Country: Japan
- Language: Japanese

Zoom In: Rape Apartments (ズームイン 暴行団地, Zoom In: Bōkō Danchi) is a 1980 violent pink film in Nikkatsu's Roman Porno series. It was director Naosuke Kurosawa's debut work.

== Plot summary ==
A woman living in an expensive Tokyo apartment suspects that the piano tuner living on the same floor is the man who raped her years before. When she witnesses the man raping another woman, she becomes convinced of his identity, but is unwilling to report him to the police because of a mysterious attraction she has towards him.

== Cast ==
- Erina Miyai (宮井えりな) as Saeko
- Yōko Azusa (梓ようこ) as Sachi
- Yūko Ōsaki (大崎裕子) as Mayuko
- Miki Yamaji (山地美貴) as High school girl
- Beniko Iida (飯田紅子) as Young housewife
- Keijirō Shiga (志賀圭二郎) as Takaya Nakabayashi
- Toshikatsu Matsukaze (松風敏勝) as Kōichi
- Ren Seidō (錆堂連) as Keigo
- Rei Takagi (高樹レイ) as Glamorous woman
- Yūko Araragi (あららぎ裕子) as Woman in the gym
- Yūko Katagiri (片桐夕子) as Opera singer
- Hidetoshi Kageyama (影山英俊)
- Setsu Midorikawa (緑川せつ)
- Yōko Ōyagi (大谷木洋子)
- Midori Mori (森みどり)

== Background ==
Zoom In: Rape Apartments was an unofficial sequel to director Kōyū Ohara's Zoom Up: Rape Site (1979), inspired by the success of that film and written by that film's screenwriter Chiho Katsurako. For Zoom In: Rape Apartments, Nikkatsu intentionally cut back on the extreme violence displayed in Ohara's earlier film. The surrealistic elements of the film, such as a scene in which liquid dripping from a woman's vagina bursts into flame upon hitting the ground, has led some to compare Kurosawa's style to that of Seijun Suzuki.

The film inspired a series of films using the Zoom In/Zoom Up title, including Zoom Up: Woman From The Dirty Magazine (1980), Zoom Up: Sexual Crime Report (1981), Zoom Up: Genuine Look At A Stripper (1982), Zoom Up: Graduation Photos (1984), and Zoom Up: Special Masturbation (1986).

== Critical appraisal ==
Japanese critics praised director Naosuke Kurosawa's use of imagery in Zoom In: Rape Apartments and the film's cinematography. They were not as impressed with the script, however, complaining that it was weak. In their Japanese Cinema Encyclopedia: The Sex Films, Thomas and Yuko Mihara Weisser give the film a rating of two-and-a-half out of four stars. They judge that the film's strong visual sense compensates for the writing, noting that pink film scripts are not generally the best. They write, "Kurosawa's 'color-and-shadow' work is akin to that of an erotic Seijun Suzuki." Allmovie warns that the film's subject matter is not for all audiences, but judges it to be "one of the Nikkatsu studio's most unusual pinku eiga films."

== Availability ==
Zoom In: Rape Apartments was released theatrically in Japan on March 15, 1980. It was released on DVD in Japan on March 24, 2006 as part of Geneon's third wave of Nikkatsu Roman porno series.

== Bibliography ==
=== English ===
- Weisser, Thomas; Yuko Mihara Weisser (1998). Japanese Cinema Encyclopedia: The Sex Films. Miami: Vital Books : Asian Cult Cinema Publications. pp. 526–527. ISBN 1-889288-52-7.
- "ZOOM IN BOKO DANCHI". The Complete Index to World Film.
- Zoom In: Rape Apartments at IMDb

=== Japanese ===
- ズーム・イン 暴行団地(1980) (in Japanese). www.allcinema.net.
- "ズームイン 暴行団地". Japanese Cinema Database (Agency for Cultural Affairs). Archived from the original on 2012-03-26.
- "ズームイン 暴行団地 (Zoom In: Bōkō Danchi)". Japanese Movie Database (in Japanese).
- ズームイン 暴行団地(邦画 ) (in Japanese). Kinema Junpo. Archived from the original on 2012-03-24.
