= Gassan =

- Film poster

Japanese name
- Kanji: 月山
- Directed by: Tetsutaro Murano
- Written by: Yukiko Takayama
- Based on: Gassan by Atsuchi Mori
- Produced by: Masayuki Satō; Tetsutaro Murano
- Starring: Hisashi Igawa; Yūko Katagiri; Atsuko Kawaguchi; Chōichirō Kawarazaki; Kin Sugai
- Cinematography: Kenji Takama
- Edited by: Tatsuji Nakashizu
- Music by: Teizo Matsumura
- Production companies: Haiyuza Eiga Hoso Company; Tetsu Productions
- Release date: October 20, 1979 (Japan)
- Running time: 103 minutes
- Country: Japan
- Language: Japanese

Gassan (Japanese: 月山) is a 1979 Japanese film directed by Tetsutaro Murano. It was Japan's submission to the 52nd Academy Awards for the Academy Award for Best Foreign Language Film, but was not accepted as a nominee.

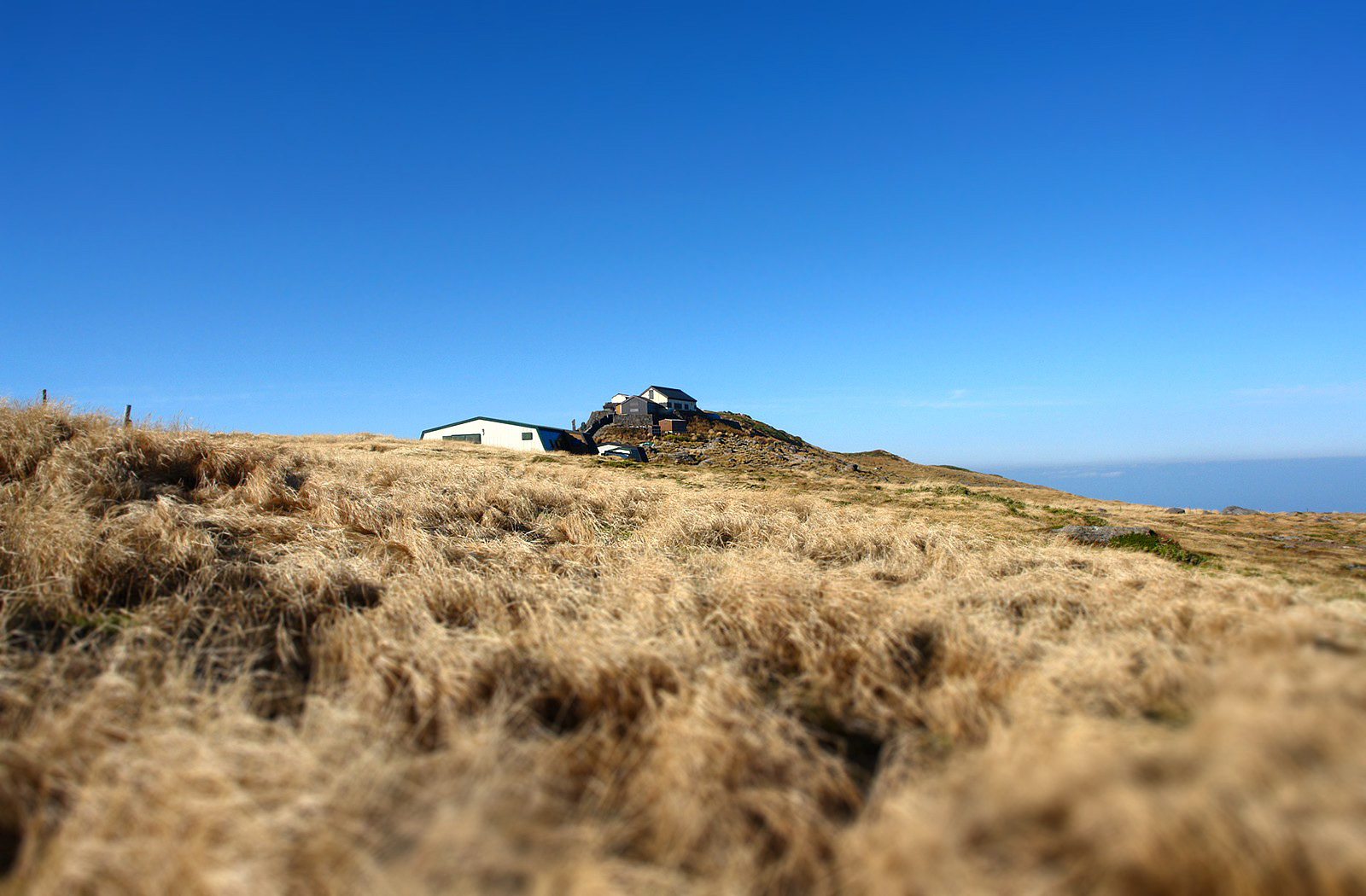
The summit of Mount Gassan

== Cast ==
- Hisashi Igawa as Iwazo
- Yūko Katagiri as Kayo
- Atsuko Kawaguchi as Wife
- Chōichirō Kawarazaki as Karasu
- Kin Sugai as Kane
- Chikako Yuri as Fumiko
- Yūsuke Takita as Tasuke

== See also ==
- List of submissions to the 52nd Academy Awards for Best Foreign Language Film
- List of Japanese submissions for the Academy Award for Best Foreign Language Film
