= 1971 in Japanese television =

Events in 1971 in Japanese television.

== Debuts ==
Show	Station	Premiere Date	Genre	Original Run
Andersen Monogatari	Fuji TV	January 3	anime	January 3, 1971 – December 26, 1971
Daichūshingura	NET	January 5	jidaigeki	January 5, 1971 - December 28, 1971
GeGeGe no Kitarō	Fuji TV	October 7	anime	October 7, 1971 – September 28, 1972
Hyppo and Thomas	Fuji TV	January 1	anime	January 1, 1971 - September 30, 1972
Kamen Rider	NET	April 3	tokusatsu	April 3, 1971 – February 10, 1973
Lupin III	Yomiuri TV	October 24	anime	October 24, 1971 – March 26, 1972
Marvelous Melmo	TBS	October 3	anime	October 3, 1971 – March 26, 1972
Mirrorman	Fuji TV	December 5	tokusatsu	December 5, 1971 – November 26, 1972
Nantatte 18 sai!	TBS	October 5	tokusatsu	October 5, 1971 – September 26, 1972
Sarutobi Ecchan	NET	October 4	anime	October 4, 1971 - March 27, 1972
Star Tanjō!	Nippon TV	October 3	talent	October 3, 1971 – September 25, 1983
Shin Obake no Q-tarō	Nippon TV	September 1	anime	September 1, 1971 – December 27, 1972
Spectreman	Fuji TV	January 2	tokusatsu	January 2, 1971 - March 25, 1972
Tensai Bakabon	Nippon TV	September 25	anime	September 25, 1971 – June 24, 1972
The Return of Ultraman	TBS	April 2	tokusatsu	April 2, 1971 – March 31, 1972
Wandering Sun	Fuji TV	April 8	anime	April 8, 1971 – September 30, 1971

== Ongoing shows ==
- Music Fair, music (1964–present)
- Key Hunter, drama (1968–1973)
- Mito Kōmon, jidaigeki (1969–2011)
- Sazae-san, anime (1969–present)
- Inakappe Taishō, anime (1970–1972)
- Ōedo Sōsamō, jidaigeki (1970–1984)
- Ōoka Echizen, jidaigeki (1970–1999)

== Endings ==
Show	Station	Ending Date	Genre	Original Run
Akaki Chi no Eleven	Nippon TV	April 5	anime	April 13, 1970 – April 5, 1971
Andersen Monogatari	Fuji TV	December 26	anime	January 3, 1971 – December 26, 1971
Ashita no Joe	Fuji TV	September 29	anime	April 1, 1970 – September 29, 1971
Attack No. 1	Fuji TV	November 28	anime	December 7, 1969 – November 28, 1971
Daichūshingura	NET	December 28	anime	January 5, 1971 - December 28, 1971
Harenchi Gakuen	Tokyo Channel 12	April 1	anime	October 1, 1970 – April 1, 1971
Mahō no Mako-chan	NET	September 9	anime	November 2, 1970 – September 9, 1971
Norakuro	Fuji TV	March 29	anime	October 5, 1970 – March 29, 1971
Okusama wa 18-sai	TBS	September 28	drama	September 29, 1970 – September 28, 1971
The Adventures of Hutch the Honeybee	Fuji TV	December 28	anime	April 7, 1970 – December 28, 1971
Tiger Mask	Yomiuri TV	September 30	anime	October 2, 1969 – September 30, 1971
Ultra Fight	TBS	September 24	drama	September 28, 1970 – September 24, 1971
Wandering Sun	Fuji TV	April 8	anime	April 8, 1971 – September 30, 1971

== See also ==
- 1971 in anime
- 1971 in Japan
- List of Japanese films of 1971
