= Mount Fuji Radar System =

Coordinates: 35.457794°N 138.803782°E

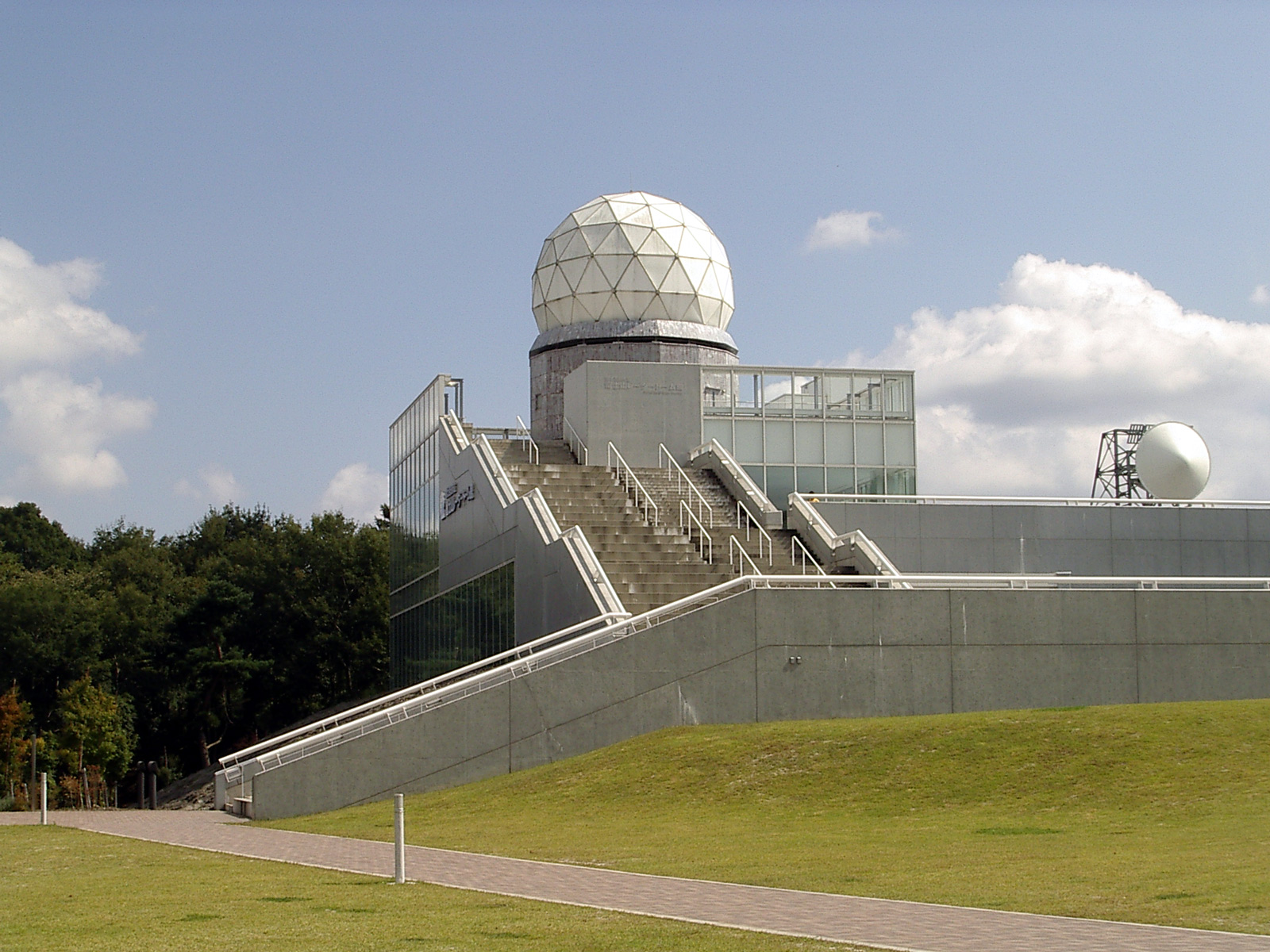
Historical Mount Fuji radar Museum.

The Mount Fuji Radar System is a historic weather radar system located on the summit of Mount Fuji, Japan.

== Construction ==
The installation was completed on August 15, 1964, and is now recorded on the list of IEEE Milestones in electrical engineering. When first built, the Mount Fuji Radar System was the world's highest weather radar (elevation 3,776 metres [12,388 ft]), and could observe major weather phenomena, such as destructive typhoons, at a range of more than 800 kilometres (500 mi). It was designed by the Japan Meteorological Agency and built by Mitsubishi Electric Corporation.

== Technology ==
The system is notable for its advances in weather radar technology, remote control, and difficulty of construction, as it required the transport and assembly of some 500 tons of material during mountain's short summer. It operated at a frequency of 2880 MHz, with output power of 1500 kilowatts, and a pulse width of 3.5 microseconds. Its antenna was a circular dish, 5 meters in diameter, of parabolic shape, rotating at either 3 or 5 revolutions per minute, and housed within a 9-meter radome.

== Use after decommission ==
The system was decommissioned in 1999, as it was superseded by weather satellites. The dome, radar dish and support equipment were relocated to a purpose-built museum in Fujiyoshida, Yamanashi in 2001. It was replaced by an automated weather system on October 1, 2008. https://www.gov-online.go.jp/eng/publicity/book/hlj/html/201801/201801_09_en.html

== See also ==
- Jirō Nitta(real name: Hiroto Fujiwara) - This construction project reader and wrote a novel 'Fuji sanchō' based on the details of this project.
