= Kero Kero Chime =

Manga and television anime

ケロケロちゃいむ (Kerokero Chaimu)
- Genre: Comedy, Fantasy
- Manga
- Written by: Maguro Fujita
- Published by: Shueisha
- Magazine: Ribon
- Original run: November 1995 – May 1998
- Volumes: 5
- Anime television series
- Directed by: Yoshitaka Koyama
- Produced by: Keisuke Iwata; Yutaka Sugiyama
- Written by: Junki Takegami
- Music by: Harukichi Yamamoto
- Studio: Studio Comet
- Original network: TV Tokyo
- Original run: March 6, 1997 – September 25, 1997
- Episodes: 30

Kero Kero Chime (ケロケロちゃいむ, Kerokero Chaimu; "Ribbit Chime") is a manga written by Maguro Fujita. A 30-episode anime series based on the manga was produced by NAS and TV Tokyo and animated by Studio Comet.

== Plot ==
Aoi, a normal school boy, is cursed by a wizard named Makaeru from the Land of Frogs, who tells him that if he wants to remove the curse he is to find Mimori, who is later discovered to be the sister of Makaeru. The curse causes Aoi to transform into a frog whenever he is wet, changing back into a human when he dries off. Makaeru then casts Aoi into the Land of Frogs, where he meets Mimori, the princess of the land. Aoi asks if she knew about the curse. However, Mimori remembers her brother's saying as he handed her the Book of Magic before he disappeared: "This book enables the frog people like us to use magic. If you find that there are some pages missing, then it is your duty to find it."

Aoi then realizes that his quest is to find the missing pages of the Book of Magic, hoping that the pages will contain the cure for the curse.

== Characters ==
Princess Mimori
Mimori is the main female character in the series. She is 14 years old and also the princess of the frog clan that is always happy and cheerful. It is known that Mimori has feelings for Aoi but has not realized it to her denseness.
Aoi
A 14 year old normal boy from the real world. He has the ability to change to a frog when he gets wet by the curse of Mimori's older brother, Makaeru. Also, Aoi has feelings for Mimori.
Suu
A 14 year old girl and princess of snake clan. She is a supporting character and she's jealous of Mimori.

=== Snake Clan ===
The land of Frogs and the land of Snakes (the two different species) had been in war, as explained in the first section of episode 1. Mimori's parents had been absorbed into a tunnel, while engaged in the battle, and left only Makaeru and Mimori to govern the kingdom.

There were a minor number of survivors from the snake clan, but Mimori soon discovers a rival: Suu, the princess from the Land of Snakes, who had survived the war, and whose parents were also absorbed. This princess begins an interest to Aoi, and is jealous of Mimori, at which she finds a sailor (whose true identity is a woman) and falls in love with her.

== Episodes ==
=== Season 1 ===
| Episode number | Air date | Episode title |
|---|---|---|
| 1 | March 6, 1997 | "The Princess of the Frog Kingdom" |
| 2 | March 13, 1997 | "Sky-flying Shippo-chan" |
| 3 | March 20, 1997 | "A Super-Big Friend!" |
| 4 | March 27, 1997 | "Leap of the Mysterious Forest" |
| 5 | April 3, 1997 | "Super Dreaming Frigitta" |
| 6 | April 10, 1997 | "Super Scary Restaurant" |
| 7 | April 17, 1997 | "Love Love Mermaid With a Crush" |
| 8 | April 24, 1997 | "The New Student in the School for Foxes" |
| 9 | May 1, 1997 | "The Startling Frog Hot Springs!" |
| 10 | May 8, 1997 | "The Monster at the Bottom of the Well" |
| 11 | May 15, 1997 | "Cat Commotion at Unyau Village" |
| 12 | May 22, 1997 | "Presenting: Makaeru's New Magic" |
| 13 | May 29, 1997 | "The Maguron Grass That Dispels Magic" |
| 14 | June 5, 1997 | "Great Commotion in the Mushroom Forest!" |
| 15 | June 12, 1997 | "Circus Troupe Murder Incident!?" |
| 16 | June 19, 1997 | "Frog Alert Today" |
| 17 | June 26, 1997 | "Duel at Cactus Fort" |
| 18 | July 3, 1997 | "Bride of the Almond Kingdom" |

=== Season 2 ===
| Episode number | Air date | Episode title |
|---|---|---|
| 19 | July 10, 1997 | "The Ghost's Heart-breaking Love" |
| 20 | July 17, 1997 | "Makaeru's Magic Showdown" |
| 21 | July 24, 1997 | "The Superstars of the 12 Zodiacs" |
| 22 | July 31, 1997 | "Surprise! A Mother Egg" |
| 23 | August 7, 1997 | "The Naked Hippo Leader" |
| 24 | August 14, 1997 | "Lesson at the Amusement Park" |
| 25 | August 21, 1997 | "Find Nameeru-kun!" |
| 26 | August 28, 1997 | "Captain Hikaru" |
| 27 | September 4, 1997 | "Suu the Mage" |
| 28 | September 11, 1997 | "The Truth That Crosses Time" |
| 29 | September 18, 1997 | "The Legendary Blue Knight" |
| 30 | September 25, 1997 | "The World is For the Two of You!" |
