= Katsuhiro Maeda =

Japanese baseball player (born 1971)

- Pitcher
- Born: June 23, 1971 (age 54); Kobe, Japan
- Batted: Right Threw: Right

Professional debut
- NPB: June 17, 1993, for the Seibu Lions
- CPBL: March 9, 2002, for the Sinon Bulls

Last appearance
- NPB: July 18, 1995, for the Seibu Lions
- CPBL: July 7, 2002, for the Sinon Bulls

NPB statistics
- Win–loss record: 0–2
- Earned run average: 4.89
- Strikeouts: 42

CPBL statistics
- Win–loss record: 3–4
- Earned run average: 4.25
- Strikeouts: 58

Teams
- Seibu Lions (1993–1995); Sinon Bulls (2002)

Katsuhiro Maeda (born June 23, 1971) is a Japanese former professional baseball pitcher. He played in Nippon Professional Baseball (NPB) for the Seibu Lions, and in the Chinese Professional Baseball League (CPBL) for the Sinon Bulls.

== Career ==
Maeda pitched for the Seibu Lions for three years. The Lions sold Maeda to the New York Yankees of Major League Baseball for $350,000 in 1996. In 2004, Maeda signed with Shanghai Eagles of the Chinese Professional Baseball League, becoming the first Japanese player to play in China.
