= Tetsutaro Murano =

Japanese film director (1929–2020)

Tetsutaro Murano (村野 鉄太郎, Murano Tetsutarō; August 18, 1929 – July 8, 2020) was a Japanese film director. In 1953, he joined the Daiei studio and started working as an assistant director. He made his director debut with Aoi Tsubasa in 1960.

Murano was born in Kagoshima on August 18, 1929, and died on July 8, 2020, at the age of 90.

== Partial filmography ==
- 1960: 青い翼 (Aoi Tsubasa)
- 1965: 鉄砲犬 (Teppô inu)
- 1965: ごろつき犬 (Gorotsuki inu)
- 1966: 銭のとれる男 (Zeni no toreru otoko)
- 1967: 早射ち犬 (Hayauchi inu)
- 1968: 闇を裂く一発 (Yami o saku ippatsu)
- 1970: 富士山頂 (Fuji sanchō)
- 1975: 鬼の詩 (Oni no uta)
- 1978: 月山 (Gassan)
- 1982: 遠野物語 (Tono monogatari)
- 1991: 上方苦界草紙 Kamigata Kugaizoshi)
- 1993: KOYA澄賢房覚え書 (Koya Choken-bou oboegaki)
