= Tatsuya Ide =

Japanese baseball player & coach (born 1971)

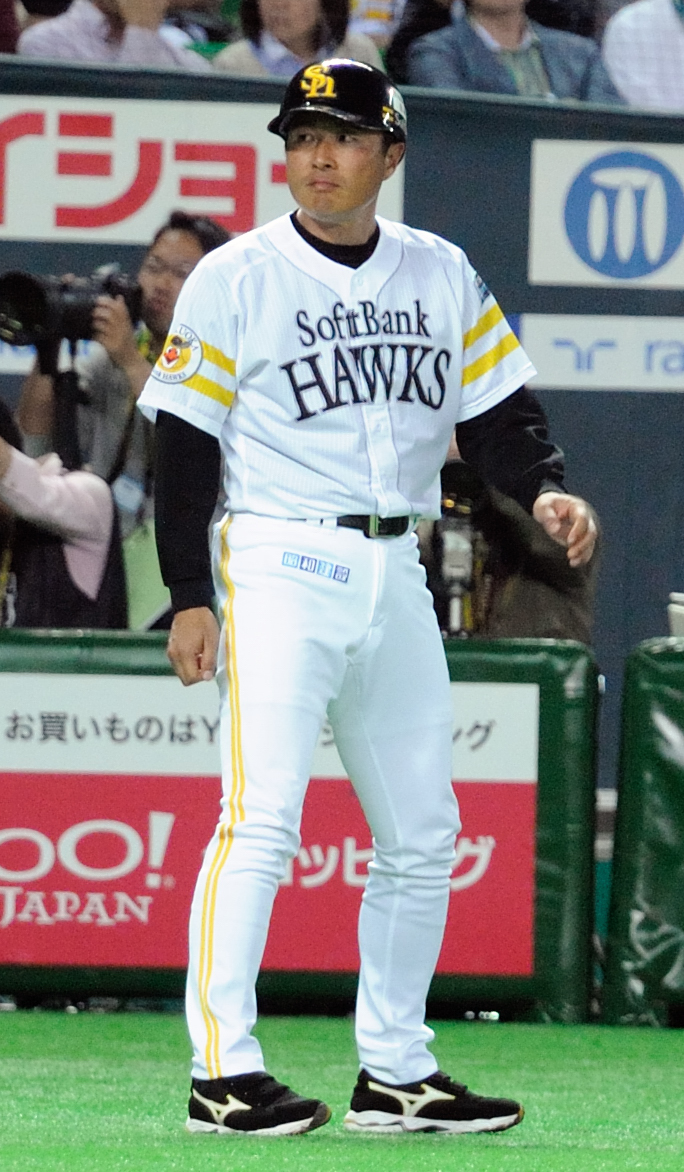
- Ide with the Fukuoka SoftBank Hawks

Fukuoka SoftBank Hawks – No. 021
- Outfielder / Coach
- Born: October 1, 1971 (age 55); Minamitsuru, Yamanashi, Japan
- Batted: Right Threw: Right

NPB debut
- April 1, 1995, for the Nippon-Ham Fighters

Last NPB appearance
- September 27, 2005, for the Fukuoka SoftBank Hawks

NPB statistics
- Batting average: .253
- Home runs: 79
- RBI: 336
- Hits: 828
- Stolen bases: 105
- Stats at Baseball Reference

Teams
- As player: Nippon-Ham Fighters (1994–2003); Yomiuri Giants (2004); Fukuoka SoftBank Hawks (2005–2006); As coach: Fukuoka SoftBank Hawks (2007–present)

Career highlights and awards
- As player: 2× NPB All-Star (1997, 2001); 2× Mitsui Golden Glove Award (1997, 2002); As coach: Japan Series champion (2025)
- Last updated on: 5 December 2023

Tatsuya Ide (井出 竜也, Ide Tatsuya; born October 1, 1971) is a Japanese former professional baseball outfielder, and current first squad outfield defense and base running coach for the Fukuoka SoftBank Hawks of Nippon Professional Baseball (NPB).

He previously played for the Nippon-Ham Fighters, Yomiuri Giants, and the Fukuoka SoftBank Hawks.

== Professional career ==
=== Active player era ===
On November 20, 1993, Ide was drafted second round pick by the Nippon-Ham Fighters in the 1993 Nippon Professional Baseball draft.

He won the Golden Glove Award twice, in the 1997 and 2002 seasons.

Ide played nine seasons with the Fighters, but was traded to Yusaku Iriki in the off-season of 2003 to the Yomiuri Giants.

In the 2004 season, he appeared in 41 games with the Giants but was released in the offseason.

He joined the Fukuoka Softbank Hawks in the 2005 season, appearing in 77 games, and announced his retirement in the 2006 season.

Ide played 11 seasons, appearing in 1,108 games and a batting average of .253, a 79 home runs, a 828 hits, a RBI of 336, a 105 stolen bases, and a 92 sacrifice bunts.

=== After retirement ===
After his retirement, Ide has been the outfield defense and base running coach of the Fukuoka SoftBank Hawks since the 2007 season.

On December 2, 2023, he was transferred to the first squad outfield defense and base running coach.
