= Castle Orgies =

- Theatrical poster for Castle Orgies (1971)
- Directed by: Isao Hayashi
- Written by: Jirō Niizeki; Masayasu Ōebara
- Produced by: Rō Miura
- Starring: Setsuko Ogawa; Yoichi Nishikawa
- Cinematography: Kenji Hagiwara
- Music by: Hajime Kaburagi
- Distributed by: Nikkatsu
- Release date: November 20, 1971
- Running time: 67 minutes
- Country: Japan
- Language: Japanese

Castle Orgies (色暦大奥秘話, Irogoyomi ōoku hiwa) aka Eros Schedule Book: Concubine Secrets and Sensual History: Shogun's Harem Secret Story is a 1971 Japanese film in Nikkatsu's Roman porno series, directed by Isao Hayashi and starring Setsuko Ogawa and Yoichi Nishikawa. Part of Nikkatsu's first Roman porno double-bill release, it was the first film in the 9-film Eros Schedule Book series, and actress Setsuko Ogawa's debut film.

== Synopsis ==
Sae is a girl in love with a samurai in Edo period Japan. Her father sends her to the Shogun's court, where she is intended to serve as a concubine to the Shogun. When her rivals start rumors that Sae is not a virgin, the Shogun angrily banishes her to a nunnery. With help from her samurai boyfriend, Sae escapes, and the two flee together.

== Cast ==
- Setsuko Ogawa: Sae
- Yōichi Nishikawa
- Yasuko Matsui
- Megumi Fuji
- Midori Mori
- Kōju Ran

== Background and legacy ==
Though Apartment Wife: Affair In the Afternoon (1971) is usually credited as the first of Nikkatsu's line of Roman Porno films, the films were released in double- or triple-bills, and Castle Orgies was Apartment Wife's partner release. These two productions indicated two directions that Nikkatsu intended to explore in its venture into the pink film genre. Apartment Wife represented the contemporary, urban stories, and Eros Schedule Book the historical period film. Both films were immediately successful with critics and audiences. Apartment Wife inspired 20 official sequels, several unofficial sequel series, and created a new theme in Japanese erotic cinema-- the "Apartment wife". Eros Schedule Book was followed by eight direct sequels. The film was actress Setsuko Ogawa's debut. Ogawa become one of Nikkatsu's first idols, focusing on historical erotic dramas throughout her career with the studio.

== Availability ==
Castle Orgies was first released theatrically in Japan on a double-bill with Apartment Wife: Affair In the Afternoon, on November 20, 1971. It was released on VHS in Japan on December 21, 1988, and again on January 14, 1994.

Along with Coed Report: Yuko's White Breasts (1971)-- part of Nikkatsu's second double-bill-- Castle Orgies was the subject of "Japan: Ancient and Modern", a feature in the March 1973 issue of the British journal Continental Film Review. The film was released by Tai Seng on all-region DVD on April 17, 2001, with Chinese and English subtitles.

== Bibliography ==
=== English ===
- "Castle Orgies". UniJapan Film Quarterly. 15 (1): 22. January 1972.
- Fentone, Steve (1998). "A Rip of the Flesh: The Japanese 'Pink Film' Cycle: Castle Origes". She. 2 (11): 9.
- "IROGOYOMI - OHOKU HIWA". British Film Institute. Archived from the original on 2009-05-26.
- "IROGOYOMI OOKU HIWA". Complete Index to World Film.
- Irogoyomi ooku hiwa (1971) at IMDb
- Sharp, Jasper (2008). Behind the Pink Curtain: The Complete History of Japanese Sex Cinema. Guildford: FAB Press. ISBN 978-1-903254-54-7.
- Weisser, Thomas; Yuko Mihara Weisser (1998). Japanese Cinema Encyclopedia: The Sex Films. Miami: Vital Books : Asian Cult Cinema Publications. ISBN 1-889288-52-7.

=== Japanese ===
- 色暦大奥秘話(1971) (in Japanese). allcinema.net.
- 色暦大奥秘話 (in Japanese). Japanese Cinema Database (Agency for Cultural Affairs). Archived from the original on 2011-10-08.
- 色暦大奥秘話 (in Japanese). Japanese Movie Database.
- 色暦大奥秘話(邦画 ) (in Japanese). Kinema Junpo.
- 色暦大奥秘話 (in Japanese). www.nikkatsu-romanporno.com. Archived from the original on 2011-07-14.
