= Coed Report: Yuko's White Breasts =

- Theatrical release poster
- Directed by: Yukihiko Kondo
- Written by: Kenshō Nakano
- Starring: Yūko Katagiri
- Distributed by: Nikkatsu
- Release date: December 1, 1971
- Running time: 70 minutes
- Country: Japan
- Language: Japanese

Coed Report: Yuko's White Breasts (女子高生レポート 夕子の白い胸, Joshikōsei report: Yūko no shiroi mune) aka Yuko's White Breasts and High School Girl Report: Yūko's White Breasts is a 1971 Japanese film in Nikkatsu's Roman porno series, directed by Yukihiko Kondo and starring Yūko Katagiri.

== Synopsis ==
Yuko is an innocent high school girl who has a crush on her gym teacher. She and her friends have a sleep-over party which develops into a sexual dare-game involving eels, and a lesbian orgy. Now sexually awakened, Yuko decides to seduce her teacher, but is raped in an elevator before she meets her teacher.

== Cast ==
- Yūko Katagiri: Herself
- Emiko Yamagishi: Maki
- Koji Satomi: Ishida
- Ranko Morita: Yūko's sister
- Kōji Kai: Hanamura
- Ei Shirai: Senior
- Kunio Shimizu: Laundry owner
- Kenji Shimamura: Middle-aged man
- Akira Takahashi: Chauffeur

== Background ==
Coed Report: Yuko's White Breasts was released theatrically in Japan on December 1, 1971 as part of the second Roman Porno double-bill. Along with Castle Orgies (1971)-- one of Nikkatsu's first two releases-- Coed Report: Yuko's White Breasts was the subject of "Japan: Ancient and Modern", a feature in the March 1973 issue of the British journal Continental Film Review.

Popular Nikkatsu Roman Porno actress Yūko Katagiri's first role, Coed Report: Yuko's White Breasts established the young and innocent image for which the actress became known. It also established Nikkatsu's practise of debuting new actresses in films in which they played a character bearing their own stage name. In their Japanese Cinema Encyclopedia: The Sex Films, the Weissers judge Coed Report: Yuko's White Breasts to be one of actress Yūko Katagiri's better films. They write that the actress was, "surprisingly fresh in the role, perhaps overly pubescent, considering the rather lurid subject matter." The character Katagiri played made her popular with Roman Porno audiences. Katagiri later tried to expand her acting range with more mature roles, such as Masaru Konuma's Secret Wife (1973).

== Bibliography ==
=== English ===
- "JOKOUSEI REPORT: YUKO NO SHIROI MUNE". Complete Index to World Film.
- Jokousei Report: Yuko no shiroi mune (1971) at IMDb
- Sharp, Jasper (2008). Behind the Pink Curtain: The Complete History of Japanese Sex Cinema. Guildford: FAB Press. pp. 124, 127, 179, 348. ISBN 978-1-903254-54-7.
- Weisser, Thomas; Yuko Mihara Weisser (1998). Japanese Cinema Encyclopedia: The Sex Films. Miami: Vital Books : Asian Cult Cinema Publications. ISBN 1-889288-52-7.

=== Japanese ===
- 女高生レポート 夕子の白い胸 (in Japanese). Japanese Cinema Database (Agency for Cultural Affairs).
- 女高生レポート 夕子の白い胸 (in Japanese). Japanese Movie Database.
- 女高生レポート 夕子の白い胸(邦画) (in Japanese). Kinema Junpo. Archived from the original on 2011-10-07.
