= Ritsuko Tanaka =

Japanese actress, tarento and singer (born 1971)

- 田中 律子
- Born: 17 July 1971 (age 54); Setagaya, Tokyo, Japan
- Occupation: Actress
- Years active: 1984–present
- Height: 159 cm (5 ft 3 in)
- Spouse: Manabu Sugimoto (m. 1997–2012)
- Website: Official website

Ritsuko Tanaka (田中 律子, 田中 理津子, Tanaka Ritsuko; born 17 July 1971, in Setagaya, Tokyo) is a Japanese actress, tarento and singer. She is formerly represented with Box Corporation. She is the president of the non-profit organization Aqua Planet. She is also the associated president of the Japan Sap Yoga and detoxification in Okinawa.

== Filmography ==
=== TV dramas ===
Year	Title	Role	Network	Notes
1985	Mama, Taihendā!	Tomoe Yazawa	TV Asahi	
1987	Abunai Shōnen		TV Tokyo	
1989	Nanashi no Tantei Series 5 Satsui no Dessan		NTV	
1989	Aishiatterukai!	Jun Mashiba	Fuji TV	
1991	Nurse Station	Akemi Shibata	TBS	
1991	Yonimo Kimyōna Monogatari: Collector	Kyoko Maeda	Fuji TV	
1991	101-Kai-me no Propose	Chie Yabuki	Fuji TV	
1992	Pole Position! Itoshiki Hito e...	Tamami Fujioka	NTV	
1992	Hatachi no Yakusoku	Saki Hojo	Fuji TV	
1993	Shōnan Joshi Ryō Monogatari	Mako Nishikawa	TV Asahi	
1993	Shiratori Reiko de Gozaimasu!	Ayame Kakitsubata	Fuji TV	
1994	Fukui sanchi no Isansōzoku	Kyoko Fujiwara	KTV	
1994	Hanjuku Tamago	Yuka Oba	Fuji TV	
1995	Aji Ichi Monme	Yoko Aizawa	TV Asahi	
1995	Natsu! Depart Monogatari		TBS	
1996	Dance Partner Renzoku Satsujin: Shakō Dance-kai ni Uzumaku Yokubō to Shitto	Yuko Shinjo	TBS	
1997	Glass no Kutsu	Yuriko Kurerin	NTV	
1997	Shinryōnaika-i Ryoko	Asami Shimizu	NTV	
2003	Kao	Tomoko Nanao	Fuji TV	
2003	Kōfuku no Ōji	Yoko Machida	NTV	
2003	Karuizawa Mystery	Kurumi Furusawa	NTV	
2005	Room Share no Onna	Kanako Kobayashi	NHK	
2007	Kodomo no Jijō	Mari Oda	TBS	
2008	Andō Natsu	Etsuko Mitsuya	TBS	
2008	Go Kinjo Tantei Satsuki Tsukino	Naoko Makabe	TBS	
2010	Keizai Documentary Drama: Rubicon no ketsudan	Yumiko Kamata	TV Tokyo	
2010	Tenshi no Dairinin	Risa Morimoto	THK	
2012	Ganriki Keibuho Yaichi Kijima	Takako Katagiri	TV Tokyo	
2012	Sprout	Hiroko Ikenouchi	NTV	
2012	Kō Kō! Kyonshī Girl: Tokyo Denshidai Senki	Hiromi Kawashima	TV Tokyo	
2013	Mayonaka no Panyasan	Yoshie Miki	NHK BS Premium	
2013	Kuro no Kassōro 3	Kanae Suzuki	Fuji TV	
2014	Is There a Vet in the House?	Nagisa Kurihara	YTV	Episode 7

=== Films ===
Year	Title
1995	Camp de Aimashou
1996	7 Tsuki 7-nichi, Hare
2013	Sango Ranger
2013	NMB48 Geinin! The Movie Owarai Seishun Girls!
2014	NMB48 Geinin! The Movie Returns Sotsugyō! Owarai Seishun Girls!

=== Variety, information programmes ===
Year	Title	Network	Notes
	Uta no Big Fight!	TV Tokyo	
	Magical Zunō Power!!	NTV	First episode panelist, regular later on
	Yoru mo Isshō kenmei.	NTV	
	Quiz itazura Daiō!	TV Asahi	
	Donuts 6	TBS	
1992	MJ -Music Journal-	Fuji TV	
1996	Ōsama no Brunch	TBS	
	Mokugeki! Docon	TV Asahi	
	Pao-Pao Channel	TV Asahi	
2004	Hapihiru!	TBS	
2010	Kiseki no Chikyū Monogatari: Kin Mirai Sōzō Science	TV Asahi	Narration
	Asaichi	NHK-G	
	Sakidori	NHK-G	
	Oshiete karada no Mikata	TBS	
2013	Local Rosen Bus Noritsugi no Tabi	TV Tokyo	
2013	Rosen Bus de Yorimichi no Tabi	TV Asahi	
2016	Sake no Hosomichi: Koyoi mo Ippai yarimasu ka	BS Asahi	

=== Internet dramas ===
Year	Title	Role	Website
2009	Yusuke Kamiji no genki no deru Koi		Bee TV
2010	Sayonara no Koi	Yoko Matsuda	Bee TV

=== Advertisements ===
Year	Title
1990	Alpen
1990	Shiseido "Styling Court"
1991	Otsuka Beverage "Shin Beano Java Tea Straight"
1991	Kameda Seika "Arabki Snack"
1991	Kirin Lemon
1992	Fuji Bank
1993	Yu Pack
1995	Ministop
	Tsumura Sofre
Lion Corporation Clinica
2010	Sukiya

== Discography ==
=== Singles ===
Year	Title	Oricon ranking	Notes
1988	"Friendship"	109	Debut single
1988	"High Wind o Oikakete"	129	
1988	"Kirai!"	165	
1989	"Mata Natsugakuru..."	174	
1989	"Wave'n Surf"		
1989	"Koibito-tachi no Illusion"		
1990	"Sunshine Woderland"	164	
1990	"Fried Frustration"		
1991	"alibi"	158	
1992	"Anata o Shitteru"		
1993	"Aoi Natsu ni Mi o makase"	93	As Litz Co.; Shōnan Joshi Ryō Monogatari theme song

=== Albums ===
Year	Title	Notes
1988	I Think So	Debut album
1989	Time & Tide	
1990	Wonder Island	
1991	Twentyce	
1993	Heart Voice	Self-produced

=== Best albums ===
Year	Title	Notes
2015	Friendship Complete Singles	All recorded singles by release date

== Bibliography ==
Year	Title	ISBN
1993	Camp de Aimashou	ISBN 978-4635330169
1994	Sweater de Outdoor Life	ISBN 978-4277111997
1994	Umi no Tobira o tataite goran	ISBN 978-4594014780
1996	natural! – Outdoor Style Book	ISBN 978-4925020008
1996	Aozora no Shita de, itadakimasu!	ISBN 978-4925020015
2002	Hajirau Mizu	ISBN 978-4835541938
2005	Furimuku yoru, odoroku yami	ISBN 978-4797452914

=== Photo albums ===
Year	Title	ISBN
1989	Marine Girl Mata Natsugakuru: Ritsuko Tanaka Shashin-shū	ISBN 978-4764815759

=== Photo essays ===
Year	Title	ISBN
2001	sweet leaf	ISBN 978-4877610722
