= Atsuyoshi Furuta =

Japanese footballer (born 1952)

Atsuyoshi Furuta 古田 篤良
Personal information
- Full name: Atsuyoshi Furuta
- Date of birth: October 27, 1952 (age 73)
- Place of birth: Hiroshima, Hiroshima, Japan
- Height: 1.74 m (5 ft 8 1/2 in)
- Position: Defender

Youth career
- 1968–1970: Hiroshima University High School

College career
Years	Team	Apps	(Gls)
1971–1974	Waseda University		

Senior career*
Years	Team	Apps	(Gls)
1975–1984	Mazda		

International career
1971–1978	Japan	32	(0)
Medal record
Mazda
Runner-up	Emperor's Cup	1978
- * Club domestic league appearances and goals

Atsuyoshi Furuta (古田 篤良, Furuta Atsuyoshi; born October 27, 1952) is a former Japanese football player. He played for Japan national team.

== Club career ==
Furuta was born in Hiroshima on October 27, 1952. After graduating from Waseda University, he joined his local club Toyo Industries (later Mazda) in 1975. The club won second place at 1978 Emperor's Cup. He retired in 1984.

== National team career ==
On August 13, 1971, when Furuta was a Waseda University student, he debuted for Japan national team against Iceland. It was the youngest player to play for Japan national team at the age of 18 years and 29 days until Daisuke Ichikawa made new record in 1998. He played at 1974 and 1978 Asian Games. He played 32 games for Japan until 1978.

== National team statistics ==
Japan national team
Year	Apps	Goals
1971	1	0
1972	4	0
1973	3	0
1974	5	0
1975	11	0
1976	2	0
1977	0	0
1978	6	0
Total	32	0
