= Maguro Fujita =

Japanese manga artist

Maguro Fujita 藤田 まぐろ
- Born: March 6, 1971 (age 55) Miyagi Prefecture
- Notable works: Kero Kero Chime

Maguro Fujita (藤田 まぐろ, Fujita Maguro; born March 6, 1971) is a Japanese manga artist. Her manga are typically shōjo works that are serialized in Ribon magazine. She is best known for writing Kero Kero Chime which was adapted into a 30-episode anime series by the Studio Comet.

== Published works ==
- Kero Kero Chime (1996–1997, serialized in Ribon, Shueisha)
- Twinkle Tiara (1999, Shueisha)
- Neringu Project (2000, Shueisha)
- Kyūketsu byōin e ikō! (1996, Shueisha)
- Emi yu ranpu (2001–2002, Shueisha)
- Shinigami-kun no Oshigoto (2002, Shueisha)
- Maigo no Kemonotachi (2004, Shueisha)
- P Angel (2005, Shueisha)
- Shizuka Hakkenden (2006, Shueisha)
- Happy Pharmacy
- Taiyou ga ippai
- N.G. heroine
- Kawaiteki shinigami
