= Yūko Katagiri =

Japanese actress (1952–2022)

- Born: 26 January 1952; Tokyo, Japan
- Died: 16 October 2022 (aged 70)
- Occupation: Actor
- Years active: 1971–2022

Yūko Katagiri (片桐夕子, Katagiri Yūko; 26 January 1952 – 16 October 2022) was a Japanese actress. She appeared in more than sixty films from 1971 to 2022. Katagiri starred in over fifty Nikkatsu Roman Porno films in eight years and once was married to Nikkatsu director Masaru Konuma, though they later divorced.

== Selected filmography ==
Year	Title	Role	Notes
1982	The Gate of Youth: Part 2	Etsuko	
1980	Zoom In: Rape Apartments	Opera singer	
1979	Gassan	Kayo	
1978	Pink Tush Girl	Tokie Yamada	
1974	Female Ninja Magic: 100 Trampled Flowers		
1971	Coed Report: Yuko's White Breasts	Herself	
