= Daisuke Motoki =

Japanese baseball player (born 1971)

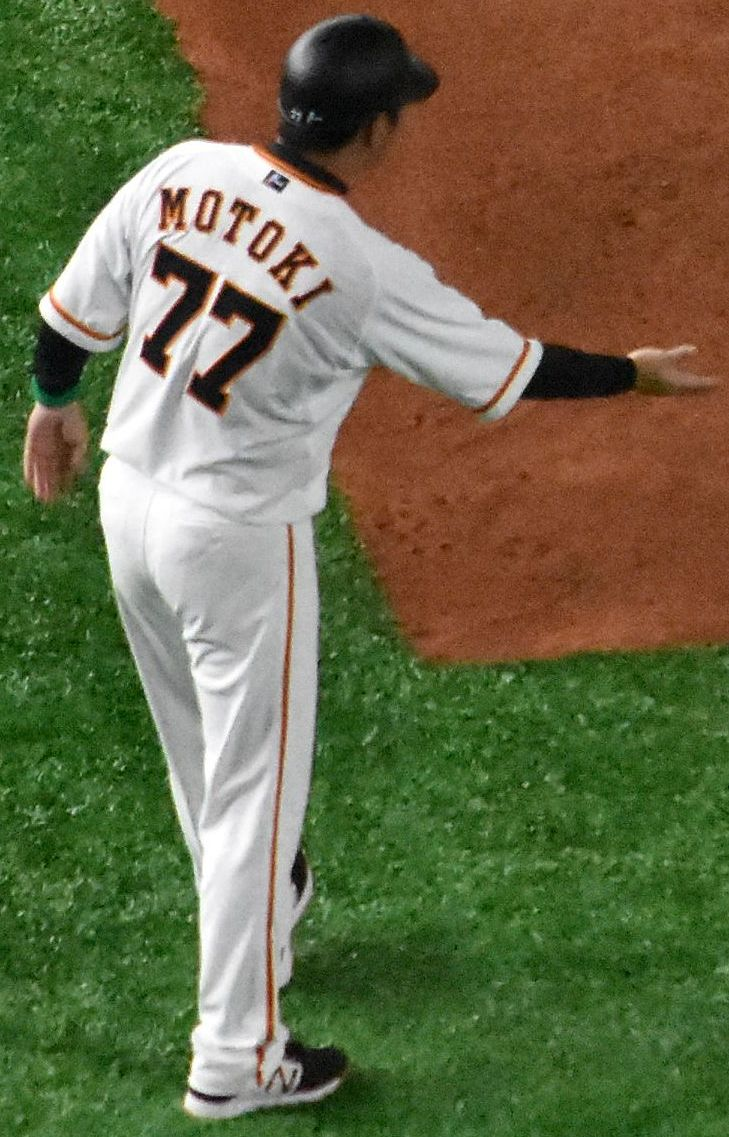
- Daisuke Motoki
- Infielder / Coach
- Born: December 30, 1971 (age 54); Toyonaka, Osaka, Japan
- Batted: Right Threw: Right

debut
- April 8, 1992, for the Yomiuri Giants

Last appearance
- October 5, 2005, for the Yomiuri Giants

Career statistics
- Batting average: .262
- Home runs: 66
- Hits: 891
- Stats at Baseball Reference

Teams
- As player: Yomiuri Giants (1991–2005); As coach: Yomiuri Giants (2019–2023)

Daisuke Motoki (元木 大介, Motoki Daisuke; born December 30, 1971) is a Japanese former Nippon Professional Baseball player.

== Filmography ==
- About Me (TBA)
