= Ryo Kawano =

Japanese baseball player and coach (born 1971)

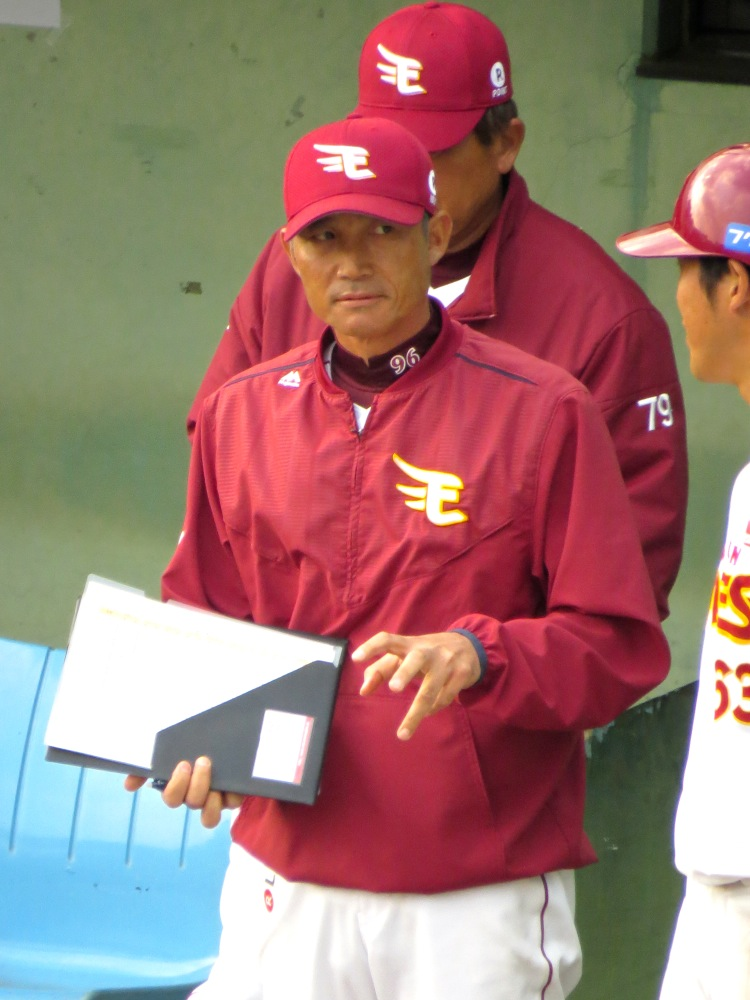
- Infielder / Coach
- Born: May 3, 1971; Yokohama, Kanagawa, Japan
- Batted: Right Threw: Right

NPB debut
- April 20, 1991, for the Yakult Swallows

Last appearance
- October 11, 2000, for the Orix BlueWave

NPB statistics (through 2001)
- Batting average: .234
- Hits: 93
- Home runs: 17
- Runs batted in: 58
- Stolen base: 0

Teams
- As player: Yakult Swallows (1990–1995); Fukuoka Daiei Hawks (1996–1999); Chunichi Dragons (1999); Orix BlueWave (2000–2001); As coach: Tohoku Rakuten Golden Eagles (2015–2018); Chiba Lotte Marines (2019–2022)

Ryo Kawano (河野 亮, Kawano Ryo; born May 3, 1971 in Yokohama, Kanagawa, Japan) is a Japanese former Nippon Professional Baseball infielder.
