= Tsutomu Iwamoto =

Japanese baseball player (born 1971)

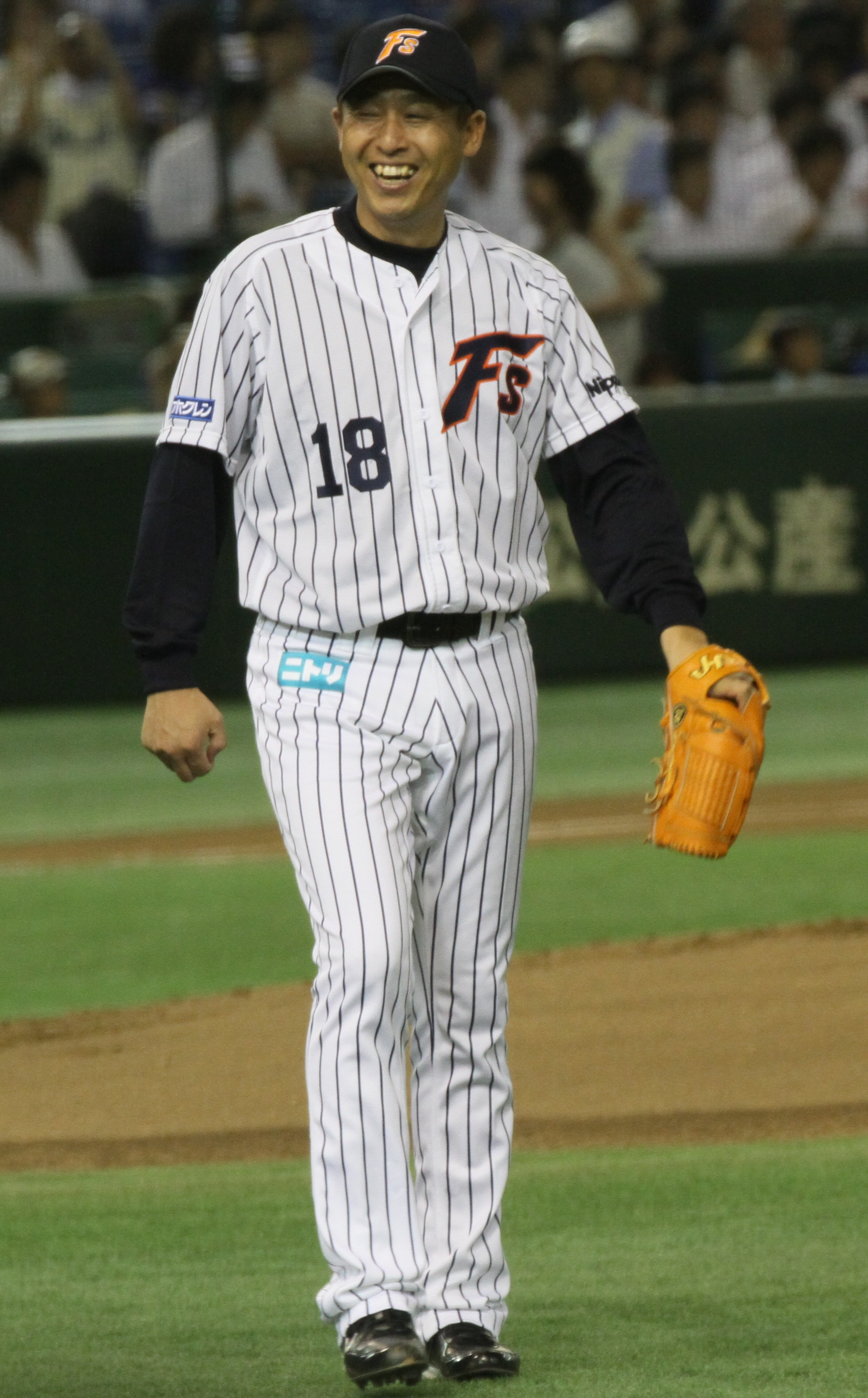
- Pitcher / Coach
- Born: May 11, 1971; Yao, Osaka, Japan
- Batted: Right Threw: Right

NPB debut
- May 11, 1991, for the Nippon-Ham Fighters

Last appearance
- September 25, 2005, for the Hokkaido Nippon-Ham Fighters

NPB statistics (through 2005)
- Win–loss record: 63–79
- Earned run average: 4.44
- Strikeouts: 885
- Saves: 3

Teams
- As player: Nippon-Ham Fighters/Hokkaido Nippon-Ham Fighters (1990–2005)

Career highlights and awards
- 3× NPB All-Star (1998–2000)

Tsutomu Iwamoto (岩本 勉, Iwamoto Tsutomu; born May 11, 1971 in Yao, Osaka, Japan) is a Japanese former Nippon Professional Baseball pitcher.
