= Yasuo Aiuchi =

Japanese snowboarder (born 1971)

Yasuo Aiuchi (相内 康夫, Aiuchi Yasuo; born 12 November 1971) is a Japanese snowboarder. Generally, he is called Aiuchi Kaichō (相内会長).

He is from Yoichi, Hokkaido. He was promoted to a professional at the age of 21. In Japan, he is recognized as one of the best snowboarders at ground-tricks, commonly called "buttering" in the west. He acted as a chairperson of Tesuri-Kyōkai (手摺狂会) until 2006. He and his teammate, Hirohisa Sato have both made appearances in many books.

Now, he works with a small Japanese snowboarding brand called "011 Artistic".
